= List of Kannada films of 2011 =

A list of Kannada language films produced in the Kannada film industry in India in 2011.

- Films are generally released every Friday
- In addition films can be released on specific festival days.

== Box office collection ==
The highest-grossing Kannada films released in 2011, by worldwide box office gross revenue, are as follows.

The rank of the films in the following depends on the worldwide gross. The budget is only for knowledgeable purpose.

The highest worldwide gross of 2011
| Rank | Title | Production company | Worldwide gross | References |
|---|---|---|---|---|
| 1 | Saarathi | Sri Araseshwari Cine Productions | ₹15 crore (US$1.6 million) | |
| 2 | Hudugaru | Chakreshwari Combines | ₹9 crore (US$930,000) | |
| 3 | Kempe Gowda | Shankar Productions | ₹8 crore (US$830,000) | |
| 3 | Jogayya | Prem Pictures | ₹8 crore (US$830,000) | |
| 3 | Paramathma | Jayanna Combines | ₹8 crore (US$830,000) | |
| 6 | Vishnuvardhana | Dwarkish Studios | ₹7 crore (US$730,000) | |
| 7 | Johny Mera Naam Preethi Mera Kaam | Jayanna Combines | ₹4.5 crore (US$470,000) | |
| 8 | Sanju Weds Geetha | Guru Raghavendra Productions | ₹3.5 crore (US$360,000) | |
| 9 | Kirataka | Amigo Indrajal Movies | ₹3 crore (US$310,000) | |
| 10 | Shyloo | K. Manju Cinemas | ₹2 crore (US$210,000) | |

== Released films ==
=== January–June ===
| Opening | | Title | Director | Cast | Music Director | Genre | Notes | Ref |
|---|---|---|---|---|---|---|---|---|
| J A N | 7th | Sri Naga Shakthi | Om Sai Prakash | Ramkumar, Shruthi, Ramesh Bhat | Sri Ganesh | Drama | | |
| J A N | 14th | Boss | P. Raghuraj | Darshan, Navya Nair, Prabhu, Umashree, Rekha Vedavyas | V. Harikrishna | Action | | |
| J A N | 21st | Kanteerava | Tushar Ranganath | Duniya Vijay, Shuba Poonja, Rishika Singh | Chakri | Action | Remake of Telugu film Simhadri | |
| J A N | 21st | Olave Mandara | Jayatheertha | Srikanth, Akanksha, Sharan | Deva | Romance | | |
| J A N | 28th | Ee Sanje | Shree | Aarya, Sanjjana, Rangayana Raghu, Kishore | Jai Shivu | Romance | | |
| J A N | 28th | Manasina Maathu | Anantha Raju | Ajay Rao, Aindrita Ray, Lohith | A. M. Neel | Romance | Remake of Tamil film Roja Kootam | |
| F E B | 4th | Kal Manja | Guruprasad | Komal Kumar, Udhayathara, Aishwarya Nag | Emil Mohammed | Comedy | Remake of Malayalam film Chathikkatha Chanthu | |
| F E B | 4th | Kalgejje | A. Bangaru | Vishwas, Roopika, Ananth Nag | Gandharva | Drama | | |
| F E B | 11th | Kote | Srinivas Raju | Prajwal Devaraj, Dimple Chopade, Priyanka Rao, P. Ravi Shankar | Raghu Dixit | Action | | |
| F E B | 11th | Rangappa Hogbitna | M. L. Prasanna | Ramesh Aravind, Sanjjana, Sanchari Vijay | M. L. Prasanna | Comedy | Inspired by Death at a Funeral (2010) | |
| F E B | 11th | 1 Day | Naveen | Appu Venkatesh, Sahana Murthy, Revanna, Mohan Juneja | Vijaya Bharathi | Thriller | Remake of Hindi film Aamir (2008) | |
| F E B | 11th | Suicide | Prasad Guru | Ruthwik, Kalyani, Sharath Lohitashwa, Suchendra Prasad | A. T. Raveesh | Thriller | | |
| F E B | 18th | Veera Bahu | S. Mahendar | Duniya Vijay, Nidhi Subbaiah, Vinaya Prasad, Rangayana Raghu | V. Harikrishna | Action | | |
| F E B | 18th | 5 Idiots | Master Anand | Master Anand, Vasu, Naveen Krishna, Namratha Hegde, Harshika Poonachha | Drums Deva | Comedy | Remake of Hindi film Darwaza Bandh Rakho | |
| F E B | 18th | Naavu Nam Hendthiru | Seetharam Karanth | Harish Raj, Ashwini, Akshata Shetty, Nethra Shetty | A. J. Prasanna | Drama | Based on the drama Samsaradalli Sanidapa | |
| F E B | 25th | Karthik | Sathish Shetty | Kartik Shetty, Archana Gupta, Avinash, Milind Gunaji, Sudha Belawadi | John Varki | Drama | Remake of Hindi film Betaab (1983) | |
| F E B | 25th | Gun | Harish Raj | Harish Raj, Mallika Kapoor, Nikita Thukral | Ronnie Raphael | Action | | |
| F E B | 25th | Saacha | Issac Baaji | Mahadev, Divya Sridhar | Parameshwara Hegde | Drama | | |
| F E B | 25th | Aptha | Sanjeev Kumar | Pooja Gandhi, Neeraj Sham, Sadhu Kokila | Escar Mario | Thriller | | |
| F E B | 25th | Take It Easy | Ananth Padmanabh | Ananth Nag, Shashikumar, Abhijeeth, Sanjjana, Sharmila Mandre | M. N. Krupakar | Comedy | | |
| M A R | 4th | Rama Rama Raghu Rama | Raghu Raj | Rangayana Raghu, Sadhu Kokila, Doddanna, Shobaraj | V. Harikrishna | Comedy | | |
| M A R | 10th | Kempe Gowda | Sudeep | Sudeep, Ragini Dwivedi, P. Ravishankar, Tara, Girish Karnad | Arjun Janya | Action | Remake of the Tamil film Singam | |
| M A R | 11th | Shravana | B. S. Rajashekar | Vijay Raghavendra, Bhuvan Chandra, Sandeep, Gayathri Iyer | Karthik Bhoopathy | Romance | | |
| M A R | 18th | Uyyale | S. Dinesh | Prabhu, Shilpa, Ramesh Bhat, Doddanna, Jai Jagadish, Tennis Krishna | Dj Ricky | Sentimental Drama | | |
| M A R | 25th | Nee Illadhe | Shiva Ganapathy | Raghu Mukherjee, Pooja Gandhi | Ashley Mendonca, Abhilash Lakra | Romance | Remake of Hindi film Gangster (2006) | |
| M A R | 31st | Prince | Om Prakash Rao | Darshan, Jennifer Kotwal, Nikita Thukral | V. Harikrishna | Romance, Action | | |
| A P R | 1st | Sanju Weds Geetha | Nagashekar | Srinagar Kitty, Ramya, Suhasini Maniratnam, Umashree Jai Jagadish | Jassie Gift | Drama, Romance | | |
| A P R | 1st | Journey | B. S. Sanjay | Arjun, Bharath Kalyan, Shanthipriya, Nisha, Mahesh Balaji | Jassie Gift | Romance, Thriller | Inspired from Hindi film Road | |
| A P R | 8th | Prema Chandrama | Shahuraj Shinde | Raghu Mukherjee, Kiran Srinivas, Rekha Vedavyas | V. Harikrishna | Romance | | |
| A P R | 8th | Mathond Madhuvena | Dinesh Babu | Ananth Nag, Suhasini Maniratnam, Tara, Naveen Krishna, Jennifer Kotwal | Giridhar Diwan | Comedy | | |
| A P R | 8th | 106 Kanasu | Aviram | Vasu Biradar, Bharath, Shreyas, Manoj, Jayanth | B. Ajaneesh Loknath | Drama | | |
| A P R | 15th | Dandam Dashagunam | K. Madhesh | Chiranjeevi Sarja, Ramya, Thilak Shekar, P. Ravishankar | V. Harikrishna | Action | Remake of Tamil film Kaakha Kaakha | |
| A P R | 15th | Ellellu Neene Nannallu Neene | Richard Castellino | Rohith, Sampritha, Rajinikanth, Neenasam Ashwath | Vijaya Bharathi | Romance | | |
| A P R | 22nd | Murali Meets Meera | Mahesh Rao | Prajwal Devaraj, Reema Vohra, Harshika Poonachha | Abhiman Roy | Romance | | |
| A P R | 22nd | Double Decker | Victory Vasu | Jaggesh, Shradha Arya | Purandar Jaipal | Comedy | Remake of Hindi film Sandwich | |
| A P R | 29th | Dhool | Dharani | Yogesh, Aindrita Ray, Prakash Raj | V. Harikrishna | Action | Remake of Tamil film Thiruvilaiyaadal Aarambam | |
| A P R | 29th | Hori | Narendra Magadi | Vinod Prabhakar, Gowri Munjal | Renu | Drama | Remake of Malayalam film Meesa Madhavan | |
| M A Y | 5th | Hudugaru | K. Madesh | Puneeth Rajkumar, Radhika Pandit, Yogesh, Srinagar Kitty, Ramya Barna | V. Harikrishna | Drama | Remake of Tamil film Nadodigal | |
| M A Y | 13th | Kool...Sakkath Hot Maga | Ganesh | Ganesh, Aamna Sharif, Sadhu Kokila | V. Harikrishna | Romance | | |
| M A Y | 13th | Devadas | Shanthakumar | Yogesh, Neetu Singh, Rangayana Raghu, Tara, Ramesh Bhat | Jassie Gift | Romance | | |
| M A Y | 20th | Puttakkana Highway | B. Suresha | Shruti, Prakash Raj, Ramesh Bhat, Veena Sundar | Hamsalekha | Drama | Produced by Duet movies and Media House | |
| M A Y | 20th | Kadheemaru | Rajashekar | Deepak, Thilak Shekar, Patre Ajith, Raviteja, Adi Lokesh, Madhuri, Priyanka Chandra | M. S. Maruthi | Drama | Remake of Hindi film Plan | |
| M A Y | 27th | Mallikarjuna | Murali Mohan | V. Ravichandran, Seetha, Sadha, Ashish Vidyarthi, Ramya Barna, Ramesh Bhat | S. A. Rajkumar | Drama | Remake of Tamil film Thavasi | |
| M A Y | 27th | Noorondu Bagilu | Vemagal Jagannatha Rao | Kiran Srinivas, Bianca Desai | V. Manohar | Romance | | |
| J U N | 3rd | Johny Mera Naam Preethi Mera Kaam | Preetham Gubbi | Duniya Vijay, Ramya, Rangayana Raghu, Sadhu Kokila | V. Harikrishna | Romance | | |
| J U N | 3rd | Rajadhani | Raghu Jaya | Yash, Sheena Shahabadi, Prakash Raj, Chetan Chandra, Umashree | Arjun Janya | Social Drama | | |
| J U N | 3rd | Dushtaa | S. Narayan | Pankaj Narayan, Surabhi Santosh | S. Narayan/Dharma Vish (background score) | Action, Romance | | |
| J U N | 10th | Namitha I Love You | M. Jayasimha Reddy | Namitha, Pruthviraj, Gollahalli Shivaprasad, Tennis Krishna | M. Jayasimha Reddy | Masala | | |
| J U N | 17th | I Am Sorry Mathe Banni Preethsona | Ravindra H. P. | Prem Kumar, Karishma Tanna, Sanjjana, Dileep Raj | Anoop Seelin | Romance | | |
| J U N | 17th | Oscar | Krishna | Ashok Kumar, Priyanka Bulgannavar, Sangeetha Shetty | Abhiman Roy | Drama | | |
| J U N | 17th | Bettada Jeeva | P. Sheshadri | H. G. Dattatreya, Rameshwari Varma, Suchendra Prasad | V. Manohar | Drama | Based on the Novel by K. Shivaram Karanth | |
| J U N | 24th | Dhan Dhana Dhan | Ramnath | Prem Kumar, Sharmiela Mandre, Ananth Nag, Rangayana Raghu | Sai Karthik | Romance | | |
| J U N | 24th | Kirataka | Pradeep Raj | Yash, Oviya Helen, Tara, T. S. Nagabharana | V. Manohar | Romantic comedy | Remake of Tamil film Kalavani | |
| J U N | 24th | Maagiya Kaala | Shivarudraiah | Nishanth, Bindushree | K. P. Venkatesh | Drama | Based on Ishwar Chandra's novel "Ondu Soorina Kathe" | |

=== July – December ===
| Opening | | Title | Director | Cast | Music Director | Genre | Notes | Ref |
|---|---|---|---|---|---|---|---|---|
| J U L | 1st | Jolly Boy | Sabapathy Dekshinamurthy | Diganth, Rekha Vedavyas, Tara, Sudha Rani, Devaraj | Yuvan Shankar Raja | Romantic Drama | Remake of Tamil film Pathinaaru | |
| J U L | 1st | Chennamma IPS | Anand. P. Raj | Ayesha, P. N. Sathya | Rajesh Ramanath | Action | | |
| J U L | 1st | Atheetha | M. Ravi Poojar | Rajesh, Priyanka Chandra | Emil Mohammed | Drama | | |
| J U L | 1st | 9 to 12 | Ashok Patil | Kishore, Nivedhitha, B. C. Patil, B. V. Radha | Sai Karthik | Suspense thriller | | |
| J U L | 8th | Shrimathi | Sampath | Upendra, Priyanka Trivedi, Celina Jaitley, Sayaji Shinde, Prem Chopra | Gurukiran | Romance, Drama | Remake of Hindi film Aitraaz | |
| J U L | 8th | Police Story 3 | Anand P. Raju, Sadhu Kokila, Victory Vasu, J G Krishna, Shankar | Sudeep, Bhumika Chawla, Sadhu Kokila, Neha Patil, Thriller Manju, Bullet Prakash | Sagar. S | Action | | |
| J U L | 15th | Krishnan Marriage Story | Nuthan Umesh | Ajay Rao, Nidhi Subbaiah, Jai Jagadish | Sridhar V Sambhram | Romance | | |
| J U L | 15th | Vinayaka Geleyara Balaga | V. Nagendra Prasad | Vijay Raghavendra, Naveen Krishna, Meghana Gaonkar | V. Harikrishna | Drama | | |
| J U L | 22nd | Yogaraj But | Dayal Padmanabhan | Naveen Krishna, Neethu | Milind Dharmasena | Romance | | |
| J U L | 22nd | Banna Bannada Loka | Ram Prasad | Ram Prasad, Meghana, Shravani | Thomas Rathnam | Romance | | |
| J U L | 29th | Chinnada Thaali | Vemugal Jagannath Rao | Thilak Shekar, Swathi, Tungashree | R. Damodar | Drama | | |
| J U L | 29th | Hare Rama Hare Krishna | C. V. Ashok Kumar | Sri Murali, Pooja Gandhi, Nakshatra, Padma Vasanthi, Siddaraja Kalyankar, Achyuth Kumar, Kote Prabhakar | Ilaiyaraja | Drama | Highlight being Hamsalekha's lyrics for Illayaraja's tunes | |
| A U G | 5th | Mr. Duplicate | Kodlu Ramakrishna | Diganth, Prajwal Devaraj, Sheetal, Sudha Belawadi, Devaraj | Mano Murthy | Romantic Drama | Remake of Tamil film Minnale | |
| A U G | 5th | Dudde Doddappa | Richard Louis | Jaggesh, Lahari, Pavitra Lokesh, Bank Janardhan, Girija Lokesh | Sadhu Kokila | Comedy | | |
| A U G | 12th | Bhadra | Mahesh Rao | Prajwal Devaraj, Daisy Shah, Sharan, Bullet Prakash | Shree Guru | Action, Romance | Remake of Telugu film Ranam | |
| A U G | 12th | Panchamrutha | T. N. Nagesh | Srinagar Kitty, Raghu Mukherjee, Pooja Gandhi, Neethu, Tara, Ravishankar Gowda, Radhika Gandhi, Dileep Raj, Ramya Barna, Yagna Shetty | Ashley Mendonca, Abhilash Lakra | Romance, Drama | | |
| A U G | 19th | Jogayya | Prem | Shivarajkumar, Pooja Gandhi, Sumit Kaur Atwal, Ravishankar Gowda | V. Harikrishna | Action, Drama | A Sequel film of Jogi | |
| S E P | 1st | Swayam Krushi | Veerendra Babu | Veerendra Babu, Tamanna, Bianca Desai, Ambareesh, Suman, Charan Raj, Umashri, Janardhana | Abhiman Roy | Drama | | |
| S E P | 1st | 90 | Lucky Shankar | Sadhu Kokila, Rangayana Raghu, Shakeela, Bullet Prakash, Doddanna | Manu - Sadhu Kokila | Comedy | | |
| S E P | 9th | Lifeu Ishtene | Pawan Kumar | Diganth, Samyukta Hornad, Ramya Barna | Mano Murthy | Romance, Drama | | |
| S E P | 9th | Allide Nammane Illi Bande Summane | Gopi Peenya | Sourav, Sriraj, Yagna Shetty, Jaggesh, Komal Kumar | Gurukiran | Comedy, Drama | | |
| S E P | 16th | Kalla Malla Sulla | Udaya Prakash | V. Ravichandran, Ramesh Aravind, Vijay Raghavendra, Ragini Dwivedi, Yagna Shetty, Rishika Singh | Alex Paul | Comedy | Remake of Tamil film Charlie Chaplin | |
| S E P | 16th | Aidondla Aidu | V. K. Prakash | Harish Raj, Dileep Raj, Devaraj, Nithya Menon, Padmapriya, Shruti | Ouseppachan; Vijay Prakash; Alphonse Joseph | Drama | | |
| S E P | 23rd | Maryade Ramanna | Guruprasad | Komal Kumar, Nisha Shah | M. M. Keeravani | Comedy, Drama | Remake of Telugu film Maryada Ramanna | |
| S E P | 23rd | Manasology | Deepak | Amoolya, Rakesh Adiga, Sadhu Kokila | Anoop Seelin | Romance | | |
| S E P | 30th | Saarathi | Dinakar Thoogudeepa | Darshan, Deepa Sannidhi, Sarath Kumar, Rangayana Raghu | V. Harikrishna | Action, Drama | | |
| S E P | 30th | Lokave Helida Maathidu | Ramana | Ravi Theja, Anitha | Venkat Narayan | Romance | | |
| O C T | 6th | Paramathma | Yogaraj Bhat | Puneeth Rajkumar, Deepa Sannidhi, Aindrita Ray, Ananth Nag, Ramya Barna | V. Harikrishna | Romance | Produced by Yograj Movies | |
| O C T | 14th | Putra | V. Umakanth | Diganth, Supreeta, Roopasri, Avinash, Sudha Belawadi | Raja Ramesh | Drama | Remake of Tamil film Em Magan | |
| O C T | 21st | Taare | Shivaraj Hoskere | Diganth, Urvashi Solanki, Sanjjana, Prof. Doddarange Gowda | C. R. Bobby | Romance | | |
| O C T | 21st | Naanalla | Dinesh Babu | Tarun Chandra, Shuba Poonja, Ananth Nag, Kushboo, Rangayana Raghu, Ramesh Bhat | Giridhar Diwan | Drama | | |
| O C T | 21st | Ishta | R. P. Krishna | Santhosh, Bhumika Chabria, Raviteja | Indrani Chabria | Romance | | |
| O C T | 28th | Kaanchaana | Sri Ganesh | Diganth, Ragini Dwivedi, Kiran Srinivas | Rishikesh Hari | Comedy, Drama | | |
| O C T | 28th | Obavva | Anand P Raju | Deepak, Ayesha | Rajesh Ramanath | Drama | | |
| N O V | 4th | Maduve Mane | Sunil Kumar Singh | Ganesh, Shradha Arya, Tabla Nani, Avinash | Manikanth Kadri | Romance | | |
| N O V | 4th | Bodyguard | Anand | Jaggesh, Daisy Shah, Spoorthi, Sadhu Kokila | Vinayachandra | Drama, Comedy | Remake of Malayalam film Body Guard | |
| N O V | 11th | Aacharya | Kushal Babu | Kushal Babu, Manasi, Devaraj, Avinash | R. Ananth Kumar | Action | | |
| N O V | 18th | Aata | B. N. Vijaykumar | Sumanth Shailendra, Vibha Natarajan, Sadhu Kokila, Avinash, Pavitra Lokesh | Sadhu Kokila | Romance | | |
| N O V | 18th | Achchu Mechchu | Himayat Khan | Tarun Chandra, Archana Gupta, Sadhu Kokila | A. M. Neel | Romance | | |
| N O V | 25th | Jarasandha | Shashank Raj | Duniya Vijay, Pranitha Subhash, Rangayana Raghu | Arjun Janya | Action, Drama | | |
| D E C | 2nd | Paagal | P. N. Sathya | P. N. Sathya, Pooja Gandhi, Harish Rai, Indrajith Lankesh, Bullet Prakash | V. Manohar | Romance | | |
| D E C | 8th | Vishnuvardhana | P. Kumar | Sudeep, Bhavana Menon, Priyamani, Sonu Sood, Dwarakish | V. Harikrishna | Action | | |
| D E C | 9th | Shyloo | S. Narayan | Ganesh, Bhama, Rangayana Raghu | Jassie Gift | Action, Drama | Remake of Tamil film Mynaa | |
| D E C | 16th | Mathe Banni Preethsona (Re-release) | Ravindra H. P. | Prem Kumar, Karishma Tanna, Sanjjanaa Galrani, Dileep Raj | Anoop Seelin | Romance | Re-released again | |
| D E C | 16th | Vishnu | Abhijeeth | Abhijeeth, Poonam, Catherine Tresa, Bullet Prakash, Ashish Vidyarthi | M. N. Krupakar | Drama | | |
| D E C | 16th | Onde Ondu Sari | Pravin Thakkottu | Ramesh, Kishore Shetty, Aakash, Shwetha | M. Rajesh | Romance | | |
| D E C | 23rd | Jedarahalli | P. N. Sathya | H. M. Krishnamurthy, Sushma, Shweta Pandit, Shobharaj | Sridhar V. Sambhram | Crime, Action | | |
| D E C | 23rd | Hero Nanalla | S. Raju | Pawan, Sahana, Jai Jagadish | Raju Upendra Kumar | Romance | | |
| D E C | 23rd | Bete | Srinivas Kaushik | Ayesha, Akshay, Alisha | Akhil | Crime | | |

== Notable deaths ==
| Month | Date | Name | Age | Profession | Notable films |
| January | 10 | S. Ramachandra | 64 | Cinematographer | Hombisilu, Deveeri, Ghatashraddha, TV Series Malgudi Days |
| April | 6 | Sujatha | 58 | Actress | Nanna Devaru, Tuttha Muthha, Neelakanta |
| September | 11 | M. S. Karanth | 67 | Actor | Gejje Pooje, Ganesha Subramanya, Chikkejamanru, Ashwamedha |
| December | 20 | Tushar Ranganath | 35 | Script-writer, Director | Kanteerava, Rakta Kanneeru, Suntaragali, Anatharu |
