= Jayanna Films =

Indian film production and distribution co

- Company type: Private
- Founded: 1995
- Headquarters: Bangalore, Karnataka, India
- Key people: Jayanna; Bhogendra
- Products: film production

Jayanna Films is an Indian film production and distribution company that works in Kannada cinema.

== Production ==
Jayanna and Bhogendra started regular production of films with 2008 film Arjun starring Darshan and Meera Chopra. In 2011 they produced Johny Mera Naam Preethi Mera Kaam starring Duniya Vijay, Ramya and Paramathma starring Puneeth Rajkumar, Deepa Sannidhi, Aindrita Ray. In 2012 they produced Jaanu starring Yash, Deepa Sannidhi and Drama starring Yash, Radhika Pandit, Sathish Ninasam, Sindhu Lokanath. In 2013 they produced Googly starring Yash, Kriti Kharbanda. Only after Googly they started seeing real money.

== Filmography ==
| Year | Title | Director | Cast | Notes | Ref |
|---|---|---|---|---|---|
| 2008 | Arjun | Shahuraj Shinde | Darshan, Meera Chopra | | |
| 2011 | Johny Mera Naam Preethi Mera Kaam | Preetham Gubbi | Duniya Vijay, Ramya | | |
| 2011 | Paramathma | Yogaraj Bhat | Puneeth Rajkumar, Deepa Sannidhi, Aindrita Ray, Anant Nag | | |
| 2012 | Jaanu | Preetham Gubbi | Yash, Deepa Sannidhi | | |
| 2012 | Drama | Yogaraj Bhat | Yash, Radhika Pandit, Sathish Ninasam, Sindhu Lokanath | Nominated - Filmfare Award for Best Film; Nominated - SIIMA Award for Best Film | |
| 2013 | Googly | Pavan Wadeeyar | Yash, Kriti Kharbanda | Nominated - SIIMA Award for Best Film | |
| 2013 | Dyaavre | Gadda Viji | Sathish Ninasam, Yogaraj Bhat, Sonu Gowda, Sruthi Hariharan, Rajesh Nataranga | | |
| 2014 | Gajakesari | Krishna | Yash, Amulya, Anant Nag, Shahbaz Khan | Nominated - Filmfare Award for Best Film; Nominated - SIIMA Award for Best Film | |
| 2014 | Mr. and Mrs. Ramachari | Santhosh Ananddram | Yash, Radhika Pandit | Won - Filmfare Award for Best Film; Won - SIIMA Award for Best Film; Won - IIFA Utsavam | |
| 2015 | Rana Vikrama | Pavan Wadeeyar | Puneeth Rajkumar, Anjali, Adah Sharma, Girish Karnad, Vikram Singh | Nominated - Filmfare Award for Best Film | |
| 2015 | Bullet Basya | Jayatheertha | Sharan, Hariprriya | | |
| 2015 | Boxer | Preetham Gubbi | Dhananjay, Kruthika Jayakumar | | |
| 2016 | Jai Maruthi 800 | A. Harsha | Sharan, Sruthi Hariharan, Shubha Poonja | | |
| 2016 | Naanu Mattu Varalakshmi | Preetham Gubbi | Prithvi, Malavika Mohanan, Prakash Raj, Madhoo | In association with Manjunath under Kollur Mookambika Creations | |
| 2017 | Bangara s/o Bangarada Manushya | Yogi G. Raj | Shiva Rajkumar, Vidya Pradeep | | |
| 2017 | Saheba | Bharath | Manoranjan Ravichandran, Shanvi Srivastava | | |
| 2017 | Mufti | Narthan | Sriimurali, Shiva Rajkumar, Shanvi Srivastava, Vasishta N. Simha, Madhu Guruswamy | | |
| 2019 | Rustum | Ravi Varma | Shivrajkumar, Vivek Oberoi, Shraddha Srinath, Rachita Ram, Mayuri Kyatari | | |
| 2021 | Bhajarangi 2 | A. Harsha | Shiva Rajkumar, Bhavana Menon | | |
| 2022 | 2nd Life | Raju Devasandra | Adarsh Gunduraj, Sindhu Rao | | |
| 2022 | Shiva 143 | Anil Kumar | Dheeren Ramkumar, Manvitha | | |
| 2025 | Royal | Dinakar Thoogudeepa | Viraat, Sanjana Anand | | |
| 2025 | Ekka | Rohit Padaki | Yuva Rajkumar, Sanjana Anand, Sampada Hulivana | | |
| 2025 | Full Meals | Vinayaka N | Likith Shetty, Kushee Ravi | Distribution only | |
