= SIIMA Award for Best Actress – Kannada =

Kannada-language media award

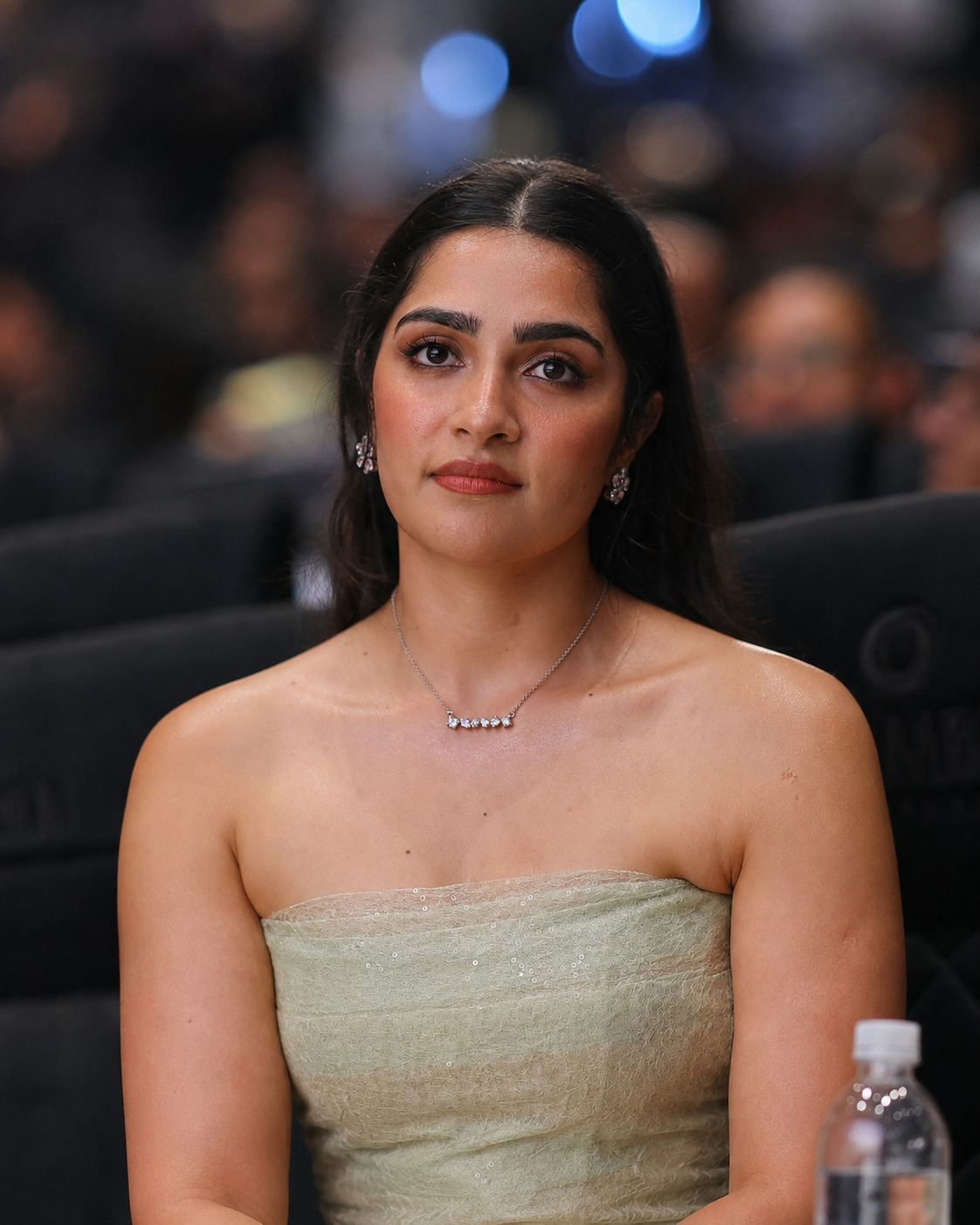
- The 2026 recipient: Rukmini Vasanth
- Awarded for: Best Performance by an Actress in a Leading Role in Kannada cinema
- Country: India
- Presented by: Vibri Media Group
- First award: 21 June 2012 (for films released in 2011)
- Most recent winner: Rukmini Vasanth, Kantara: Chapter 1 (2025)

Highlights
- Most wins: Rachita Ram (3)
- Most nominations: Rachita Ram (7)

SIIMA Award for Best Actress – Kannada is presented by Vibri media group as part of its annual South Indian International Movie Awards, for best acting done by an actress in Kannada films. The award was first given in 2012 for films released in 2011.

== Superlatives ==
Categories	Recipient	Notes
Most wins	Rachita Ram	3
Most nominations	Rachita Ram	7
Oldest winner	Milana Nagaraj	Age 31
Youngest winner	Shanvi Srivastava	Age 24

- One actress has won the awards in consecutive years: Rachita Ram (2018-2019).
- Ashika Ranganath, Rukmini Vasanth and Shanvi Srivastava have also won the SIIMA Critics Award for Best Actress – Kannada.

=== Multiple winners ===
Wins	Recipient(s)
3	Rachita Ram
2	Ashika Ranganath

=== Multiple nominations ===
Nominations	Recipient(s)
7	Rachita Ram
5	Ashika Ranganath
4	Radhika Pandit
3	Pranitha Subhash, Parul Yadav, Sruthi Hariharan, Rashmika Mandanna, Chaithra J Achar, Rukmini Vasanth
2	Ramya, Kriti Kharbanda, Amulya, Shraddha Srinath, Niveditha, Nishvika Naidu

== Winners and nominees ==
Table key
‡	Indicates the winner

=== 2010s ===
Year	Actress	Film	Ref.
2011 (1st)	Ramya ‡	Sanju Weds Geetha	
2012 (2nd)	Priyamani ‡	Chaarulatha	
2012 (2nd)	Ragini Dwivedi	Shiva	
2012 (2nd)	Pranitha Subhash	Bheema Theeradalli	
2012 (2nd)	Ramya	Sidlingu	
2012 (2nd)	Radhika Pandit	Addhuri	
2013 (3rd)	Aindrita Ray ‡	Bhajarangi	
2013 (3rd)	Kriti Kharbanda	Googly	
2013 (3rd)	Amulya	Shravani Subramanya	
2013 (3rd)	Radhika Pandit	Dilwala	
2013 (3rd)	Pranitha Subhash	Whistle	
2014 (4th)	Radhika Pandit ‡	Mr. and Mrs. Ramachari	
2014 (4th)	Kriti Kharbanda	Super Ranga	
2014 (4th)	Amulya	Gajakesari	
2014 (4th)	Parul Yadav	Shivajinagara	
2014 (4th)	Pranitha Subhash	Brahma	
2015 (5th)	Rachita Ram ‡	Ranna	
2015 (5th)	Mayuri Kyatari	Krishna Leela	
2015 (5th)	Parul Yadav	Vaastu Prakaara	
2015 (5th)	Radhika Pandit	Endendigu	
2015 (5th)	Shanvi Srivastava	Masterpiece	
2016 (6th)	Shraddha Srinath ‡	U Turn	
2016 (6th)	Hariprriya	Neer Dose	
2016 (6th)	Parul Yadav	Killing Veerappan	
2016 (6th)	Shruti Hariharan	Godhi Banna Sadharana Mykattu	
2016 (6th)	Vedhika	Shivalinga	
2017 (7th)	Shanvi Srivastava ‡	Tarak	
2017 (7th)	Nivedhitha	Shuddhi	
2017 (7th)	Rashmika Mandanna	Chamak	
2017 (7th)	Shraddha Srinath	Operation Alamelamma	
2017 (7th)	Shruti Hariharan	Beautiful Manasugalu	
2018 (8th)	Rachita Ram ‡	Ayogya	
2018 (8th)	Ashika Ranganath	Raambo 2	
2018 (8th)	Manvitha Harish	Tagaru	
2018 (8th)	Shruti Hariharan	Nathicharami	
2018 (8th)	Sonu Gowda	Gultoo	
2019 (9th)	Rachita Ram ‡	Ayushman Bhava	
2019 (9th)	Rashmika Mandanna	Yajamana	
2019 (9th)	Shanvi Srivastava	Avane Srimannarayana	
2019 (9th)	Anupama Parameswaran	Natasaarvabhowma	
2019 (9th)	Radhika Narayan	Mundina Nildana	

=== 2020s ===
Year	Actress	Film	Ref.
2020 (9th)	Milana Nagaraj ‡	Love Mocktail	
2020 (9th)	Nivedhitha	Popcorn Monkey Tiger	
2020 (9th)	Kushee Ravi	Dia	
2020 (9th)	Yagna Shetty	Act 1978	
2020 (9th)	Nishvika Naidu	Gentleman	
2021 (10th)	Ashika Ranganath ‡	Madhagaja	
2021 (10th)	Rashmika Mandanna	Pogaru	
2021 (10th)	Rachita Ram	Love You Rachchu	
2021 (10th)	Amrutha Iyengar	Badava Rascal	
2021 (10th)	Nishvika Naidu	Sakath	
2022 (11th)	Srinidhi Shetty ‡	KGF: Chapter 2	
2022 (11th)	Ashika Ranganath	Raymo	
2022 (11th)	Sapthami Gowda	Kantara	
2022 (11th)	Rachita Ram	Monsoon Raaga	
2022 (11th)	Sharmila Mandre	Gaalipata 2	
2022 (11th)	Chaithra J Achar	Gilky	
2023 (12th)	Chaithra J Achar ‡	Toby	
2023 (12th)	Meghana Raj	Tatsama Tadbhava	
2023 (12th)	Megha Shetty	Kaiva	
2023 (12th)	Rachita Ram	Kranti	
2023 (12th)	Rukmini Vasanth	Sapta Saagaradaache Ello: Side A	
2023 (12th)	Sindhu Sreenivasa Murthy	Aachar & Co	
2024 (13th)	Ashika Ranganath ‡	O2	
2024 (13th)	Chaithra J Achar	Blink	
2024 (13th)	Rachita Ram	Matinee	
2024 (13th)	Roshni Prakash	Murphy	
2024 (13th)	Rukmini Vasanth	Bhairathi Ranagal	
2024 (13th)	Sharanya Shetty	Krishnam Pranaya Sakhi	
2025 (14th)	Rukmini Vasanth ‡	Kantara: Chapter 1	
2025 (14th)	Ashika Ranganath	Gatha Vaibhava	
2025 (14th)	Paavana Gowda	Agnyathavasi	
2025 (14th)	Sreeleela	Junior	
2025 (14th)	Sanjana Anand	Ekka	
2025 (14th)	Sonal Monteiro	Maadeva	

== See also ==
- SIIMA Critics Award for Best Actress – Kannada
