= Jaanu (2012 film) =

2012 Indian film by Preetham Gubbi

- Directed by: Preetham Gubbi
- Screenplay by: Preetham Gubbi
- Story by: Preetham Gubbi
- Produced by: Jayanna; Bhogendra
- Starring: Yash; Deepa Sannidhi; Rangayana Raghu; Madhu Guruswamy
- Cinematography: S. Krishna
- Edited by: Deepu S. Kumar
- Music by: V. Harikrishna
- Production company: Jayanna Combines
- Distributed by: Jayanna Films
- Release date: 1 June 2012
- Running time: 137 minutes
- Country: India
- Language: Kannada
- Budget: ₹ 3 crores
- Box office: ₹ 2 crores

Jaanu is a 2012 Kannada romantic action film directed by Preetham Gubbi and produced by Jayanna Combines. Yash and Deepa Sannidhi are the lead actors while Rangayana Raghu, Sadhu Kokila, Shobaraj among others play the supporting roles. V. Harikrishna is the score and soundtrack composer. The movie was remade in Odia in 2018 as Love Express.

== Cast ==
- Yash as Siddharth
- Deepa Sannidhi as Jaanu
- Rangayana Raghu
- Sadhu Kokila
- Laya Kokila
- Chikkanna
- Madhu Guruswamy
- Raghav Uday
- Shobaraj
- Rockline Sudhakar
- Rajashekhar Naidu
- Sangeetha
- M. S. Umesh
- Ravi Varma

== Production ==
=== Development ===
Following Haage Summane and Johny Mera Naam Preethi Mera Kaam, Preetham Gubbi joined with producers Jayanna Combines, as with earlier films.

== Box office ==
Jaanu was a much anticipated film and got a good opening. But the film met with mixed response upon release, although it went on to be commercially successful at the box office by completing 50 days of run.

== Soundtrack ==
Jaanu

Soundtrack album by V. Harikrishna
- Released: 13 May 2012
- Genre: Feature film soundtrack
- Length: 20:26
- Label: Ashwini Media

V. Harikrishna composed the film's background score and music for its soundtrack. The album consists of five tracks. Lyrics for the tracks were penned by Yogaraj Bhat and Jayant Kaikini. The album released on 13 May 2012.

Track listing
| No. | Title | Lyrics | Singer(s) | Length |
|---|---|---|---|---|
| 1. | "En Samachara Ree" | Yogaraj Bhat | Tippu | 4:08 |
| 2. | "Kaddu Mucchi" | Jayant Kaikini | Anuradha Bhat | 3:38 |
| 3. | "Kan Muchro Kan Muchri" | Yogaraj Bhat | V. Harikrishna | 4:11 |
| 4. | "Neene Nanna Saviganasu" | Jayant Kaikini | Sonu Nigam | 4:10 |
| 5. | "Swalpa Bitkondu" | Yogaraj Bhat | V. Harikrishna, Lakshmi Vijay | 4:19 |
| Total length: | | | | 20:26 |

== Reception ==
=== Critical response ===
A critic from The Times of India scored the film at 3 out of 5 stars and says "Yash rocks with a scintillating performance, Deepa Sannidhi shines as a girl from North Karnataka but could have done a better job. Music by V Harikrishna has some catchy tunes; cinematography by Krishna doesn’t stand up to his reputation". Srikanth Srinivasa from Rediff.com scored the film at 2.5 out of 5 stars and wrote "Harikrishna's music is adequate and so is Krishna's camera work. Director Preetham Gubbi should have dramatised the climax scenes a little more. Jaanu is an average entertainer that lacks the zing thing in the climax that could have left some impression on the audiences' minds". A critic from News18 India wrote "S. Krishna has handled his work quite efficiently. Hari Krishna's background music is more impressive than his composition work. There are many weak points in 'Jaanu'. Still it is good for a one time watch". A critic from Bangalore Mirror wrote "But it is a surprise that filmmakers believe that just the presence of Rangayana Raghu and Sadhu Kokila is enough to make people laugh. It is a forced attempt at laughter that their characters try and does not have the effect".
