= Royal (film) =

2025 Indian Kannada film

- Theatrical release poster
- Directed by: Dinakar Thoogudeepa
- Written by: Raghu Niduvalli
- Screenplay by: Dinakar Thoogudeepa; Raghu Niduvalli
- Story by: Raghu Niduvalli
- Produced by: Jayanna; Bhogendra
- Starring: Viraat; Sanjana Anand; Raghu Mukherjee; Chaya Singh
- Cinematography: Sanketh Mysuru
- Edited by: K. M. Prakash
- Music by: Charan Raj
- Production company: Jayanna Films
- Distributed by: KRG Studios
- Release date: 24 January 2025
- Country: India
- Language: Kannada

Royal is a 2025 Indian Kannada-language masala film directed by Dinakar Thoogudeepa, written by Raghu Niduvalli and produced by Jayanna Films. The film stars Viraat and Sanjana Anand in lead roles, along with Raghu Mukherjee, Chaya Singh, Rangayana Raghu and Achyuth Kumar in supporting roles. The music was composed by Charan Raj, while cinematography and editing were handled by Sanketh Mysuru and KM Prakash.Royal is released on 24 January 2025 and Despite receiving mixed reviews, the film emerged as a commercial success at the box office, highlighting the undeniable stamina of both the hero and the director.

== Plot ==
The film opens with Krishna (Viraat), a charming yet cunning con artist, being escorted by police after a high-profile arrest. Through a series of flashbacks, the narrative reveals Krishna's life as a street-smart swindler who thrives on trickery and quick money. His escapades include duping a group of girls led by Sanjana (Sanjana Anand) during a trip to Goa, where he poses as a male entertainer, steals their phones, and demands ransom. Initially furious, Sanjana gradually discovers Krishna's softer side, learning about his troubled childhood and his dream of living a “royal life.”

Krishna's world turns upside down when he learns that he is the estranged son of Sudarshan (Achyuth Kumar), a wealthy food-products tycoon who has been in a coma following a freak accident. Raised by his mother (Chaya Singh), who once opposed unethical practices in the family business, Krishna inherits not just a fortune but a crumbling empire on the brink of bankruptcy. The revelation forces him to abandon his conman instincts and shoulder the responsibility of saving the company, honoring his mother's ideals.

As Krishna steps into the corporate world, he faces a formidable adversary in Raghu Mukherjee, a ruthless rival businessman determined to seize control of the food empire. What follows is a gripping battle of wits, where Krishna uses his street-smart skills to outmaneuver boardroom conspiracies, legal traps, and sabotage attempts. Amidst this chaos, his relationship with Sanjana evolves from mistrust to love, adding emotional depth to the high-stakes drama.

The climax blends family sentiment, corporate intrigue, and action, as Krishna fights to protect his mother's legacy and restore the company's lost glory. In doing so, he transforms from a carefree trickster into a responsible heir, proving that true royalty lies in character, not wealth.

== Cast ==
- Viraat as Krishna
- Sanjana Anand as Sanjana
- Raghu Mukherjee
- Chaya Singh as Seetha
- Achyuth Kumar as Sudarshan
- Rangayana Raghu
- Pramod Shetty
- Ravi Bhat
- Gopalkrishna Deshpande
- Abhilash
- Gourav Shetty
- Master Surya Thoogudeepa

== Production ==
Royal marks director Dinakar's return to cinema after six years. The title launch was held on 6 February 2023 which was presided by Ashwini Puneeth Rajkumar and producer Vijay Kiragandur. In March 2021, it was reported that Dinakar would team up with Jayanna Films and direct a film with Puneeth Rajkumar in the lead role. However, with the death of Puneeth, the project was shelved and subsequently called off by the makers. Later, with the same producers, Dinakar teamed up and cast Viraat of Kiss (2019) fame upon the decision made by the producers. In July 2022, Dinakar tweeted "We are Overwhelmed to present our next vision Production 23 to be directed by me and produced by Jayanna Films’ Jayanna and Bhogendra Sir" confirming that the project would be a youthful commercial entertainer with thriller elements. He roped in Salaga actor Sanjana Anand to play the female lead. She joined the film sets in August 2022. He further confirmed that the subject he intended to do with Puneeth Rajkumar was not the same as this film's story. The principal photography of the film began in February 2023 in various parts of Karnataka and Goa states.

== Release ==
Slated for the theatrical release on 24 January 2025, Royal team arranged for a pre-release screening on 20 January. Actor Darshan made his first public appearance after his legal trouble and supported the film. The special screening was also arranged for Darshan-Dinakar's mother Meena Thoogudeepa. Post the screening, Dinakar revealed that "Darshan watched the film because of my son Surya, who is making his debut as a child artist with this film".

== Soundtrack ==
The soundtrack consists of songs composed by Charan Raj. The audio rights were acquired by Saregama Kannada label.

Track listing
No.	Title	Lyrics	Singer(s)	Length
1.	"Tang Tang"	Kaviraj	Anurag Kulkarni	4:09
2.	"Nooru Koti Devaru"	V. Nagendra Prasad	Sai Vignesh	3:06
3.	"Atom Bomb"	Kaviraj	Vijay Prakash, Vaish Kannan	4:11
4.	"Naane Krishna Naane Shaam"	V. Nagendra Prasad	Sanjith Hegde, M. M. Manasi	4:10
5.	"Title song"	Kaviraj	Hemanth	4:08
Total length:				21:33

== Reception ==
The movie received mixed reviews from critics, with opinions split on its commercial masala appeal and reliance on clichés. The Hindu’s Vivek M. V. wrote, “Royal is a typical Dinakar Thoogudeepa entertainer with Viraat's charisma carrying the film, but it struggles to rise above formulaic storytelling and predictable tropes.” Times of India’s Sridevi S. noted, “Royal delivers a vibrant commercial package with action and romance, but its over-the-top drama and uneven pacing may not appeal to all.” A. Sharadhaa of The New Indian Express offered praise, stating, “Viraat shines in Dinakar’s signature family entertainer, with emotional highs and action sequences making Royal a crowd-pleasing watch, despite some narrative flaws.” Shashiprasad S. M. of Times Now echoed this, writing, “Dinakar returns to form with a typical commercial masala entertainer in Royal, where Viraat’s energy and the film’s vibrant execution make it engaging.” Conversely, Deccan Herald’s Swaroop Kodur was critical, stating, “Royal struggles with clichés and a lack of fresh ideas, making it a forgettable addition to Dinakar's filmography despite Viraat's efforts.” Y. Maheswara Reddy of Bangalore Mirror had a more positive take, noting, “Royal offers much action and more romance, with Viraat and Sanjana Anand's chemistry elevating this commercial entertainer.” Manjunath B. Kotagunasi of Hindustan Times remarked, “Royal is a formulaic yet enjoyable masala film, with Viraat's performance and Dinakar's direction catering well to commercial cinema fans.”
