= Viraat (actor, born 1995) =

Indian actor

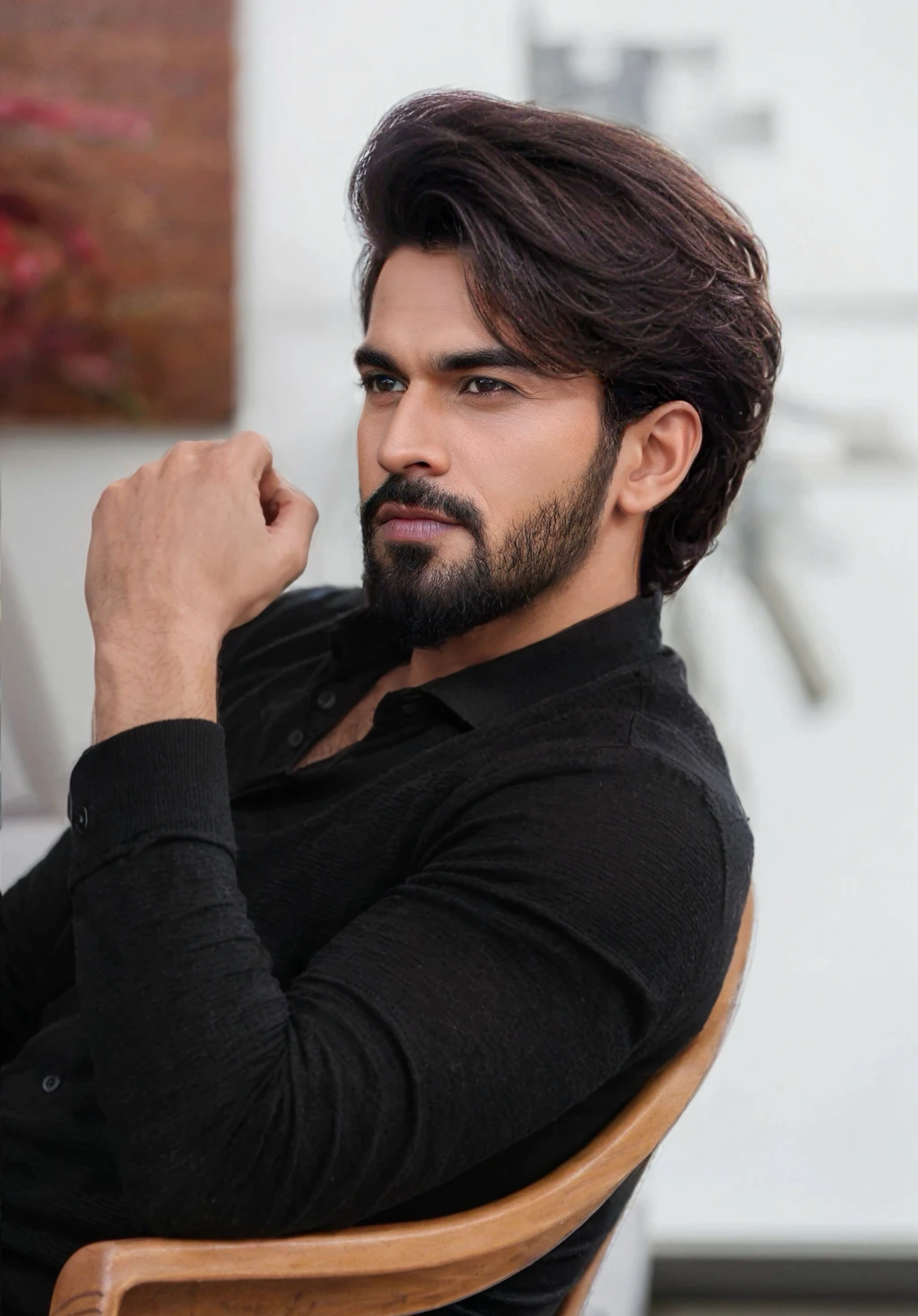
- Viraat in 2025
- Born: Karthik S. Kumar; 11 March 1995 (age 31); Mysore, Karnataka, India
- Occupation: Actor
- Years active: 2015–present
- Height: 6 ft (183 cm)

Karthik S. Kumar (born 11 March 1995), professionally known as Viraat, is an Indian film and television actor who works primarily in the Kannada entertainment industry. He gained recognition for his lead role in the television series Jothe Jotheyali (2015) and made his feature film debut with Kiss (2019).

== Career ==
After completing his tele-series Jothe Jotheyali, Viraat was paired opposite Sree Leela who also made her debut in the film Kiss. The film was released to mixed reviews from critics and became a commercial success at the box office with its 100 days successful run. Viraat received favorable responses from critics for both his acting and dancing skills. He was nominated at the SIIMA Awards under Best Debut Actor – Kannada category.

Viraat's next project titled Royal released in 2025 which marked a comeback film for the director Dinakar Thoogudeepa after a gap of six years. Viraat was paired opposite Sanjana Anand and the film was produced by Jayanna Combines. Upon release, the film met with average response from critics and audiences.

== Filmography ==
Year	Title	Role	Notes	Ref.
2019	Kiss	Arjun	SIIMA Award for Best Debut Actor IIFA Award for Best Debut Actor	
2025	Royal	Krishna		

=== Television ===
Year	Title	Role	Channel	Notes
2015	Jothe Jotheyali	Abhay	Zee Kannada	credited as Karthik S. Kumar

== Awards ==
Year	Award	Category	Work	Result
2015	Zee Kutumba Awards	Best Actor – Lead Role (Male)	Jothe Jotheyali	Won
2015	Karnataka Sahitya Parishath Award	Best Actor	Jothe Jotheyali	Won
2015	Sadhane Award	Best Actor	Jothe Jotheyali	Won
2021	SIIMA Awards	Best Debut Actor – Male – Kannada	Kiss	Won
2021	IIFA Utsavam	Best Debut Actor – Male – Kannada	Kiss	Won
