= Just Pass =

- Theatrical release poster
- Directed by: KM Raghu
- Produced by: KV Shashi Dhar
- Starring: Shri Mahadev; Pranati BG; Sadhu Kokila
- Cinematography: Sujay Kumar
- Music by: Harshavardhan Raj
- Release date: 9 February 2024
- Country: India
- Language: Kannada

Just Pass is a 2024 Indian Kannada-language film directed by KM Raghu and starring Shri Mahadev and Pranati BG with Sadhu Kokila and Rangayana Raghu in supporting roles. The film was produced by KV Shashi Dhar and the music composed by Harshavardhan Raj. It was theatrically released on 9 February 2024.

== Cast ==
- Shri Mahadev
- Pranati BG
- Sadhu Kokila
- Rangayana Raghu as Dalavayi
- Prakash Thuminad
- Govinde Gowda

== Production ==
In December 2022, KM Raghu finalized the cast. Shri Mahadev to be playing the lead role, Pranathi was selected to play the female lead role opposite Shri. Principal photography began on 14 December 2022.

== Reception ==
A. Sharadhaa from The New Indian Express rated the film 3 out of 5 stars and stated "compelling viewers to rethink their perspectives on education and societal expectations". Sridevi S from The Times of India rated the film 3 out of 5 stars and opined, "Just Pass is a thought-provoking film but it's marred by a templated, predictable script. However, it still makes for a good one-time watch". A reviewer from Times Now rated the film 3 out of 5 stars and wrote "the film's strong performances and relevant social commentary make it worth a watch, especially for those interested in thought-provoking dramas with a social message".
