= Johnny Johnny Yes Papa (film) =

2018 film directed by Preetham Gubbi

- Directed by: Preetham Gubbi
- Written by: Preetham Gubbi
- Story by: Preetham Gubbi
- Produced by: Duniya Vijay
- Starring: Duniya Vijay; Rachita Ram
- Cinematography: Karunakar. A
- Edited by: Ganesh Mallaiah
- Music by: B. Ajaneesh Loknath
- Production company: Duniya Talkies
- Release date: 30 March 2018
- Country: India
- Language: Kannada

Johnny Johnny Yes Papa is a 2018 Indian Kannada-language action film directed and written by Preetham Gubbi. The film is made under the Duniya Talkies banner owned by actor Duniya Vijay who also plays the lead role. The film is a sequel to their previous venture Johny Mera Naam Preethi Mera Kaam (2011). The rest of the principal cast include Rachita Ram, Rangayana Raghu and Sadhu Kokila. The film's soundtrack is composed by B. Ajaneesh Loknath.

The first look teaser of the film was released on 19 January 2018 on YouTube.

The name of the film originates from the nursery rhyme Johny Johny Yes Papa.

== Cast ==
- Duniya Vijay as Johnny
- Rachita Ram as Priya
- Rangayana Raghu as Pappa
- Achyuth Kumar as Priya's father
- Sadhu Kokila as Dr. Halappa
- Master Hemanth as Beeja aka B Jayaram
- Raghu Pandeshwar as Inspector Rakshit Shetty
- Nagabhushana as Rahul
- Zachary Coffin as Peter
- Mayuri as Angel, Extend Cameo appearance
- Preetham Gubbi as Preetam, the groom
- Gaddappa as House Owner
- Girija Lokesh as Dr.Ramachandra's mother
- Agnisakshi Priyanka as Drama Artist

== Reception ==
A review in the Deccan Herald criticised the film's screenwriting and Tabala Nani's dialogue, praising Vijay's "brilliant dialogue delivery" as the film's only consolation.

== Soundtrack ==
Johnny Johnny Yes Papa

Soundtrack album by B. Ajaneesh Loknath
- Released: 2018
- Recorded: 2018
- Language: Kannada
- Label: Duniya Talkies
- Producer: B. Ajaneesh Loknath

B. Ajaneesh Loknath chronology
Rajaratha (2018)	Johnny Johnny Yes Papa (2018)	Vaasu Naan Pakka Commercial (2018)

The film's soundtracks are composed by B. Ajaneesh Loknath. The music rights were acquired by Jio Music.

All tracks are written by Dhananjay Ranjan.

Tracklist
No.	Title	Singer(s)	Length
1.	"Hosa Padmavathi"	Vijay Prakash, Indu Nagaraj	03:43
2.	"Johny Johny Yes Papa"	Puneeth Rajkumar	03:32
3.	"Johny Manasanna"	Vijay Prakash	03:51
4.	"Neene Nanagella"	Armaan Malik, Bobby C. R.	04:01
