= Dil Rangeela =

2014 film by Preetham Gubbi

- Poster
- Directed by: Preetham Gubbi
- Written by: Preetham Gubbi
- Produced by: K. Manju
- Starring: Ganesh; Rachita Ram; Priyanka Rao
- Cinematography: H. C. Venugopal
- Edited by: Jo Ni Harsha
- Music by: Arjun Janya
- Production company: K. Manju Cinemaas
- Release date: 7 March 2014
- Country: India
- Language: Kannada

Dil Rangeela (transl. Colourful heart) is a 2014 Indian Kannada-language romantic comedy film written and directed by Preetham Gubbi. The film stars Ganesh, Rachita Ram and Priyanka Rao. K. Manju produced the film under his banner K. Manju Cinemaas. The film marks the return of Ganesh and Gubbi together after Maleyali Jotheyali (2009). The original score and soundtrack for the movie were produced by Arjun Janya.

The film was Released on 7 March 2014 around 125 theaters across Karnataka.

== Plot ==
Anuradha (Priyanka Rao), daughter of hotel owner (Achyuth Kumar), is in love with hotel chef Preetham (Ganesh). On his visit to Goa, Preetham meets Khushi (Rachita Ram) who impresses him. He helps Khushi get over her failed romance with Vicky. On the other side, Anuradha is preparing for her engagement with Preetham. On the day of the engagement, Anuradha misbehaves with Preetham's mother. This makes him to leave her and come back to Khushi. The story takes a curious turn when he sees Khushi with her estranged boyfriend. He then gets drunk. Anuradha arrives to beach with 'her friend Khushi who reveals that Vicky had come with his mother to invite her to his wedding and not to propose her. Both reunite.

== Cast ==
- Ganesh as Preetham
- Rachita Ram as Khushi
- Rangayana Raghu as Tony D'Costa
- Priyanka Rao as Priya
- H. G. Dattatreya
- Bhargavi Narayan
- Achyuth Kumar as hotel owner
- Jayashree Raj as Khushi's sister
- Girish Shivanna as Giri
- Vishwas
- Yamuna Srinidhi

== Production ==
The film, its cast and crew were announced on the auspicious day of Ganesha Chaturthi at a temple in Bangalore. It was also reported that the filming would take place in Bangalore, Mysore and Goa while the songs would be shot abroad. The first excerpt from the film was released early in January 2014.

== Soundtrack ==
The film's audio release was held at Chancery Pavilion in Bangalore in the presence of several celebrities including the lead star Ganesh and his wife Shilpa and the lead actresses. Actresses Amulya, Sanjjanaa, the film producer K. Manju, composer Arjun Janya were also present. It was earlier reported that the singer Ankit Tiwari would make his South Indian debut with a song for this film.

Dil Rangeela

Soundtrack album by Arjun Janya
- Released: 14 February 2014
- Genre: Film soundtrack
- Label: Anand Audio

=== Track list ===
No.	Title	Lyrics	Singer(s)	Length
1.	"First 30 Amele 60"	Chandan Shetty	Vijay Prakash	04:00
2.	"Nillu Nillu"	Jayanth Kaikini	Karthik, Priya Himesh	04:13
3.	"Uppu Huli"	Yogaraj Bhat	Arjun Janya	04:05
4.	"Early Morning"	V. Nagendra Prasad	Arjun Janya, Anitha	03:59
5.	"Yellu Yellu"	Nagesh Prasanna	Priya Himesh	04:10
6.	"Nillu Nillu"	Jayanth Kaikini	Ankit Tiwari	04:13

== Reception ==
=== Critical response ===
The Times of India scored the film at 3.5 out of 5 stars and says "Ganesh excels in a role that suits him well. Ruchitha Ram is brilliant in her expression and dialogue delivery. Priyanka Rao should improve her dialogue delivery. Music by Arjun Janya is okay. But H C Venu’s camerawork is marvellous, especially in the opening shot." Shyam Prasad S of Bangalore Mirror scored the film at 3 out of 5 stars and says "Since the standard of film songs in Kannada has risen several notches in the last few years, the fact that there are only two hit songs in the film could be a let-down for some. Overall, the film is a good watch and won’t disappoint anyone searching for two hours of good time."Sify wrote "Camera by HC Venu spans across the beautiful locations and is surely an amazing part of the movie, while the musical score by Arjun Janya are an added advantage to the movie. The movie is near to perfect as a weekend entertainer."
