= Modalasala =

2010 Indian film by Purushottham C. Somanathapura

- Directed by: Purushottham C. Somanathapura
- Written by: Purushottham C. Somanathapura
- Produced by: Yogesh Narayan
- Starring: Yash; Bhama
- Cinematography: H. C. Venugopal
- Edited by: T. Shashikumar
- Music by: V. Harikrishna
- Production company: Karnataka Talkies
- Release date: 8 December 2010
- Running time: 146 minutes
- Country: India
- Language: Kannada

Modalasala (transl. First time) is a 2010 Indian Kannada romantic drama film written and directed by Purushottham C. Somanathapura in his debut, produced by Yogesh Narayan and stars Yash and Bhama in the lead roles. Rangayana Raghu, Tara, Avinash and Sharan feature in supporting roles.

== Plot ==
The film is about two youngsters, both of whom are quite the ideal children. A young man named Karthik falls in love with Deepu and decides to propose to her. However, Deepu makes him wait for the approval of her parents, who do not support the union.

== Cast ==
- Yash as Karthik
- Bhama as Deepu
- Rangayana Raghu as Deepu's father
- Tara as Deepu's mother
- Avinash as Karthik's father
- Sharan as Manju, a mechanic
- Master Rakesh
- Shille Manjunath as Tiger
- Vishwa
- Lakshman
- Thimme Gowda
- Ramanand

== Soundtrack ==
Modalasala

Soundtrack album by V. Harikrishna
- Released: July 2010
- Recorded: 2010
- Genre: Feature film soundtrack
- Label: Swasthik Music

V. Harikrishna scored the film's background music and its soundtrack, with its lyrics written by V. Nagendra Prasad and Kaviraj. The track "Love Me Or Hate Me" was taken from the 1978 film Shankar Guru, the lyrics for which was written by Chi. Udayashankar. The soundtrack album consists of five tracks. The album was released in July 2010 in Bangalore.

=== Track listing ===
No.	Title	Lyrics	Singer(s)	Length
1.	"Maleye Maleye"	V. Nagendra Prasad	Anuradha Bhat
2.	"Modalasala"	V. Nagendra Prasad	Rajesh Krishnan
3.	"Modalasala Manadolage"	Kaviraj	Anuradha Sriram
4.	"Love Me Or Hate Me"	Chi. Udayashankar	Ranjith
5.	"Prathama Prathama"	V. Nagendra Prasad	Srinivas, Sunitha Upadrashta

== Reception ==
=== Critical response ===
A critic from The Times of India scored the film at 3.5 out of 5 stars and says "Watch the movie with your family and wards to know the climax. Yash steals the show while Bhama too is superb. Rangayana Raghu and Tara are graceful. Hats off to brilliant cinematography by H C Venu. Music director V Harikrishna has scored some melodious tunes, especially the song Prathamaa (penned by V Nagendra Prasad)". Sunayana Suresh from DNA wrote "New girl Bhama makes a decent debut, though Deepu, who has dubbed for her, deserves equal applause. Rangayana Raghu and Tara excel, the film shows Raghu in a different light, as opposed to his over-the-top comical roles". A critic from Deccan Herald wrote "Venu’s camera work, which initially develops a cataract, and V Harikrishna’s score add polish to this neat film with a few cute moments. Modala Sala also makes some squirm at its climax, but then that’s again cinema". A critic from Bangalore Mirror wrote "The star of the film, however, is HC Venugopal, the cinematographer, by doing away with artificial lighting, but manages to show natural images as if he has invented some new colours. (A few trees are actually painted in artificial colour in one scene). The picturesque Coorg (hills, trees and waterfalls) gets a new showcase in his frames. The dialogues meander between being mundane and striking. But it is mostly the former. Easily avoidable".

== Accolades ==
58th Filmfare Awards South

- nominated, Best Supporting Actor – Kannada — Rangayana Raghu
- nominated, Best Supporting Actress – Kannada — Tara
- nominated, Best Female Playback Singer – Kannada — Sunitha Upadrashta for "Prathama"

2010 Suvarna Film Awards

- Best Supporting Actor — Rangayana Raghu
- Find of the Year — Purushottham C. Somanathapura
