= Rustum (2019 film) =

2019 Indian Kannada-language action crime film

- Theatrical release poster
- Directed by: Ravi Varma
- Written by: Soorya
- Produced by: Jayanna; Bhogendra
- Starring: Shiva Rajkumar; Vivek Oberoi; Shraddha Srinath; Rachita Ram; Mayuri Kyatari
- Cinematography: Mahendra Simha
- Edited by: Deepu S. Kumar
- Music by: Anoop Seelin
- Production company: Jayanna Combines
- Release date: 28 June 2019
- Country: India
- Language: Kannada

Rustum is a 2019 Indian Kannada-language action crime film directed by Ravi Varma in his directorial debut. It was produced by Jayanna and Bhogendra under the banner of Jayanna Combines. The film features Shiva Rajkumar, Vivek Oberoi, Shraddha Srinath, Rachita Ram and Mayuri Kyatari in the lead roles, while Harish Uthaman, Mahendran, Arjun Gowda and Shatru appear in supporting roles.

The film marks the Kannada debut of Oberoi, Shatru, Mahendran and Uthaman. This is the first Kannada film to be set in Bihar for a large part of the film. The film was also noted to have a large portion of the second half of the film in Hindi language. A sequel was announced after the film became a commercial success at the box office.

== Plot ==
Abhishek Bhargav alias Abhi relocates to Bangalore with his wife Anjana alias Anju, sister Ammu and little daughter Putti. Abhi meets his new neighbour, who is a headmaster, and learns that the headmaster's son IAS officer Subhakar Deshpande is missing under mysterious circumstances. Subhakar filed a complaint to the police, only for some henchman to threaten him to withdraw the complaint and hand over some evidence to them. After learning this, Abhi decides to support him.

Meanwhile, Home Minister Durga Prasad is planning to make his younger son Aadhi Prasad to stand for nomination in elections and it is revealed that Aadhi is behind Subhakar's disappearance and is pressuring Subhakar's father for the evidence. Aadhi learns of Abhi supporting Subhakar's father to pressurise the department to find Subhakar. Aadhi kidnaps Ammu from a theatre where Abhi tries to chases them, but loses their sight and notes down their car number. With the help of SI Kiran Kumar, Abhi tracks the car's owner, who is actually Durga Prasad's elder son Arjun Prasad.

Kiran arrest Arjun Prasad in order to force him to surrender Aadhi, but is saved by the police commissioner where he suspends Kiran and detains Abhi in the station. Enraged about Arjun's arrest, Durga Prasad asks Bunty Yadav to deal with Abhi. When Bunty arrives and is about to kill him. Abhi fights back, where Bunty gets frightened after seeing Abhi, who recognizes him as ACP Abhishek alias Rustum.

Past: Abhi relocates with his family to Patna after receiving a transfer order where he meets his best friend DCP Bharath Raj, who is settled in Patna, along with his wife Rachu and sister Ammu, who is completing her IAS training. Abhi investigates about a missing child where he learns that Bunty Yadav is actually indulging in child trafficking. Abhi tracks Bunty at his hideout where he kills the henchman and is about to kill Bunty, but Bharath and his team arrive and prevents Abhi from doing so. Later, Abhi thrashes an MLA named Sundar Pandey at the police station, when he tries to pressurise Bharath to release Bunty.

Due to this, Abhi is suspended for where he, along with his family leave for a break. After learning from Ammu about child beggars increasing in the city due to their organs being removed. Bharath interrogates Bunty where he learns that Durga Prasad and Arjun Prasad are involved in illegal organ trading. With the help of Subhakar, Bharat conducts a sting operation at Durga Prasad's hospital in Goa and collects enough evidence to arrest them for their illegal activities. Bharath heads to Patna to arrest Durga Prasad's henchmen involved in organ trading. Durga Prasad, along with Arjun Prasad arrive and reveals that they killed Subhakar and buried him in a construction site.

Arjun blackmails Bharath by holding Rachu at gunpoint, Realizing that she will be burden for Bharath's honesty. Rachu kills herself in front of Bharath. Enraged, Bharath tries to kill them, but gets killed and frames it as a gang-war. Ammu and Abhi get devastated about Bharath's death where Ammu tries to commit suicide, but is saved by Abhi where he assures that Bharath's death will be avenged. Abhi investigates the incident where he deduce a mole in the department, who is Inspector Yadav where he corces Yadav to shoot himself. Yadav kills himself and Abhi goes undercover to investigate Durga Prasad's involvement in organ trading.

Present: Abhi gets back on duty where he collects evidence from Subhakar's parents and also kills Aadhi. Abhi raids Durga Prasad's warehouses, companies and hospital. Later, Abhi is taken to Durga Prasad where he battles and kills Durga Prasad, Arjun Prasad and their henchmen, thus avenging Bharath's death.

== Cast ==
- Shiva Rajkumar as DCP Abhishek Bhargav (Abhi) aka Rustum
- Vivek Oberoi as DCP Bharath Raj
- Shraddha Srinath as Anjana aka Anju
- Rachita Ram as Rachana aka Rachu
- Mayuri Kyatari as Ammu
- Mahendran as Durga Prasad
- Harish Uthaman as Arjun Prasad
- Arjun Gowda as Aadi Prasad
- RJ Rohith as Inspector Kiran
- Shatru as Bunty Yadav
- Shivraj K R Pete as PC Shivu
- Sakshi Chaudhary in an item number Singaravva

== Production ==
Vivek Oberoi dubbed his own lines in Kannada.

== Music ==
No.	Title	Singer(s)	Length
1.	"You Are My Police Baby"	Raghu Dixit, Apoorva Sridhar	3:15
2.	"Bhale Bhale"	Vyasraj Sosale	3:31
3.	"Singaaravva"	M. M. Manasi	4:20
4.	"Rustum Title Track"	Anoop Seelin	3:49
5.	"Devara Aghaada Ninne"	Kailash Kher	4:35
6.	"You Are My Police Baby"	Anoop Seelin	3:15

== Release ==
The film was scheduled for release on 14 June 2019, but was postponed to 28 June 2019 because of delays in its computer graphics work.

== Reception ==
=== Critical response ===
Rustum received mixed reviews from critics.

Sunayana Suresh of The Times of India gave 3 out of 5 stars and wrote "Rustum is a more contemporary stylized commercial drama, which still tries to retain the tropes of a big hero film. It has its moments and gives ample scope for fans to whistle. It makes for a one-time watch for fans of Sandalwood's Century Star." Aravind Shwetha of The News Minute gave 3 out of 5 stars and wrote "Stunt master Ravi Varma has chosen a safe subject for his debut as director, but he could have at least chosen to tell the predictable story differently. All said and done, Shivanna fans are likely to be pleased by the effort." A. Sharadhaa of Cinema Express gave 3 out of 5 stars and wrote "Rustum is a good attempt by the first-time director and it will definitely impress Shivarajkumar’s fans."

Shyam Prasad. S of Bangalore Mirror gave 3 out of 5 stars and wrote "Rustum's biggest strength is its screenplay. It is a straightforward story which you would 'encounter' in any decent cop film. The screenplay gives it the ammunition necessary to keep the narration engaging. The dialogues are witty and there are ample one-liners to remember. Some of the scenes are brilliantly conceptualised. Though not exactly the kind of cop movies Saikumar made popular, Rustum is the kind that a stunt master would dream of. It is Ravi Varma's dream come true. For an action film, it has the barest minimum of really violent scenes." Manoj Kumar. R of The Indian Express gave 1 out of 5 stars and wrote "It seems like the filmmakers tried to pull out a narrative out of thin air after going to the sets. In fact, put a bunch of toddlers in a room and ask them to come up with a story, it will still be a better film than what Ravi Varma and his team have created."

== Accolades ==
In 9th South Indian International Movie Awards, the film received 2 nominations.

- Best Debut Director - Ravi Varma
- Best Cinematographer - Mahendra Simha
