= Rangasamudra =

- Theatrical release poster
- Directed by: Rajkumar Aski
- Produced by: Hoysala Konanur
- Starring: Rangayana Raghu; Raghavendra Rajkumar; Sampath Raj; Skanda Tejas; Karthik Rao; Divya Gowda
- Cinematography: R. Giri
- Edited by: Srikanth
- Music by: Desi Mohan
- Production company: Hoysala Creations
- Release date: 19 January 2024
- Running time: 132 minutes
- Country: India
- Language: Kannada

Rangasamudra (transl. Ocean of Stage) is a 2024 Indian Kannada-language family action drama film directed by Rajkumar Aski and starring Rangayana Raghu, Raghavendra Rajkumar, Sampath Raj, Skanda Tejas, Karthik Rao and Divya Gowda. The film was released on 19 January 2024 to mixed reviews.

== Cast ==
- Rangayana Raghu as Channappa
- Raghavendra Rajkumar as Philanthropist
- Sampath Raj as Money lender
- Skanda Tejas as Goobe a.k.a. Mahalinga
- Karthik Rao as Kannada teacher
- Divya Gowda as English teacher
- Mohan Juneja
- Mugur Suresh
- Ugram Manju
- Kokila
- Daniel J. Kiran
- Mimicry Gopi
- Mahendra
- Pratham
- Preetham
- Mallu
- Sadananda

== Soundtrack ==
The music was composed by Desi Mohan and lyrics were written by Vaghesh Channagiri. The soundtrack features a song "Hathurina Deepa" sung by M. M. Keeravani.

All lyrics are written by Vagish Channagiri.

Track listing
No.	Title	Singer(s)	Length
1.	"Kailasa"	Kailash Kher, Vagish Channagiri	4:16
2.	"Hogatlaga"	Desi Mohan	4:08
3.	"Untu Eno Untu"	Vijay Prakash	4:14
4.	"Hathurina Deepa"	M. M. Keeravaani	4:35
5.	"Aa Aa Ee Ee"	Sanjith Hegde	3:52
Total length:			21:05

== Reception ==
A critic from The Times of India rated the film three out of five and wrote that "Rangasamudra is recommended for a meaningful one-time watch".

A critic from Bangalore Mirror rated the film 2 1/2 out of 5 stars and wrote that "All in all, family audiences may find it worth their while".

A critic from The New Indian Express gave the film the same rating and wrote that "A blend of family drama, revenge, and a dash of action, the film, despite its occasional shortcomings, manages to captivate, making it an engaging watch".

A critic from Times Now gave the film the same rating and wrote that "While the film tries to blend a heart-felt family drama and a revenge story with a splash of action, it fails to do so seamlessly. However, it's still a engaging watch".
