= Rachita Ram =

Indian actress (born 1993)

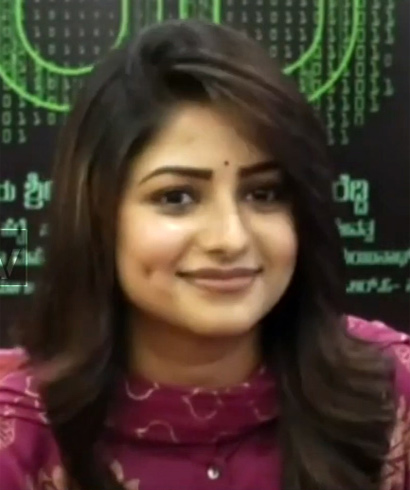
- Born: Bindhiya Ram; 3 October 1992 (age 34)
- Occupation: Actress
- Years active: 2010–present
- Relatives: Nithya Ram (sister)

Rachita Ram (born Bindhya Ram; 3 October), is an Indian model and actress who predominantly works in Kannada films. Considered as one of the popular and highest paid Kannada actresses, Rachita is a recipient of one Filmfare Award South and three SIIMA Awards.

After appearing in various television shows, Rachita made her film debut with the 2013 film, Bulbul, for which she earned the Filmfare Award for Best Actress – Kannada nomination. She later won the Filmfare Critics Award for Best Actress – Kannada for her performance in Ranna (2015). Rachita went onto established herself with successful films such as Chakravyuha (2016), Pushpaka Vimana (2017), Bharjari (2017), Ayogya (2018), Seetharama Kalyana (2019), Natasaarvabhowma (2019), Ayushman Bhava (2019), Monsoon Raaga (2022) and Kranti (2023). Her highest grossing release came with the Tamil film Coolie (2025).

== Early life ==
She is a trained classical Bharata Natyam dancer who has given more than 50 performances.

She has a sister, Nithya Ram, who is also a television and film actress.

== Career ==
=== Early work and success (2010–2017) ===
In 2012, she auditioned for a lead role in Bulbul alongside 200 participants and was selected. Before that she worked in the Kannada television soap Benkiyalli Aralida Hoovu along with her sister Nithya Ram. She was paired opposite Darshan in the film that went on to become a success commercially. On her performance, G. S. Kumar of The Times of India wrote, "Rachita Ram has presented an excellent performance in her first movie" and added, "Rachita is amazing with her dialogue delivery, body language and excellent expressions." Her first release of 2014 was Dil Rangeela, in which she was paired opposite Ganesh. B. S. Srivani of Deccan Herald felt that she "delivers a seasoned performance" in the film. Her second release of the year saw her paired opposite Darshan again in Ambareesha. The film and her performance earned negative reviews from critics. In Ranna, she played Rukmini, the love interest of Sudeep, appearing in a small yet pivotal role. In Rathavara, she appeared as the love interest of Sriimurali, who plays a gangster and key aide of an MLA. Sunayana Suresh wrote, "Rachita Ram looks pretty and has acted every bit the cutesy girl-next-door that is required of her".

Rachita starred in the 2016 Kannada movie Chakravyuha opposite Puneeth Rajkumar. She made a cameo appearance in Jaggu Dada starring Darshan. She also appeared in a song opposite Sudeep in Mukunda Murari. Rachita's first release of 2017 was Pushpaka Vimana opposite Ramesh Aravind, where she played his daughter. Her next release was Chethan Kumar's Bharjari opposite Dhruva Sarja; it is also her second movie with actress Haripriya, after Ranna.

=== Critical acclaim and fluctuations (2018–2024) ===
In 2018 her first release was Preetham Gubbi's Johnny Johnny Yes Papa opposite Duniya Vijay. Her next release was Mahesh Kumar's Ayogya opposite Sathish Ninasam. A Bangalore Mirror critic stated that she "charms her way" through the film. She also appeared in a song opposite Shiva Rajkumar in the film The Villain.

In 2019, Rachita had several successful films. Her first release was Seetharama Kalyana, opposite Nikhil Kumar, which emerged as a blockbuster hit. Aravind Shwetha of The News Minute noted, "Rachita is highly convincing. It looks like a tailor-made role for her and it is a treat to watch her on the big screen." Her next release was Puneeth Rajkumar's Natasaarvabhowma directed by Pavan Wadeyar, her second collaboration with Puneeth after Chakravyuva. The film was a box office success. She appeared in a song in the movie Amar starring Abhishek Gowda. Her next release was R. Chandru's I Love You opposite star Upendra. She also made an appearance in Shiva Rajkumar's Rustum directed by Ravi Varma, where she was paired up with Vivek Oberoi. Later, she made a special appearance in a song in Bharaate opposite Sriimurali. This was followed by Ayushman Bhava where she played a musician opposite Shiva Rajkumar. A Shraddha of Cinema Express noted, "Rachita is seen in total contrast from her previous film, and she outshines others with her performance."

After a gap of a year, In 2021 her first release was with Ramesh Aravind directorial 100 where she played Ramesh's sister character. The movie became an average grosser at the box office. Her next release in the year was Shankar's Love You Rachchu where she was paired opposite Ajay Rao, the film failed at the box office. In 2022, Rachita expanded to Telugu films, opposite Kalyan Dev in Super Machi, which had an average run at the box office. She then appeared in Ek Love Ya, in a cameo in James, and in Monsoon Raaga opposite Dhananjaya.

In 2023, Rachita appeared opposite Darshan, in Kranti, which was a box office hit. Then, she played the lead in Veeram opposite Prajwal Devraj and Bad Manners opposite Abhishek Ambareesh. Her first release of 2024 became Matinee opposite Sathish Ninasam.

=== Recent work (2025–present) ===
Rachita started 2025 with the sequel Sanju Weds Geetha 2, opposite Srinagara Kitty. The film was a critical and commercial failure. She then made her debut in Tamil films with Coolie, where she played a criminal and smuggler's wife opposite Soubin Shahir. Janani K of India Today stated, "Rachita Ram leaves a mark with her short yet effective performance."

== Media image ==
Rachita has established herself as a leading actress in Kannada cinema. In the Bangalore Times Most Desirable Women list, Rachita was placed 8th in 2017, 11th in 2018 and 2019, and 15th in 2020. She is one of the most followed Kannada actress on Instagram.

== Filmography ==
=== Films ===
- All films are in Kannada, unless otherwise noted.

Key
| † | Denotes films that have not yet been released |

List of Rachita Ram films and roles
| Year | Title | Role | Notes | Ref. |
|---|---|---|---|---|
| 2013 | Bulbul | Kaveri | | |
| 2014 | Ambareesha | Karuna | | |
| 2014 | Dil Rangeela | Khushi | | |
| 2015 | Ranna | Rukmini | | |
| 2015 | Rathavara | Navami | | |
| 2016 | Chakravyuha | Anjali | | |
| 2016 | Jaggu Dada | Herself | Guest appearance | |
| 2016 | Mukunda Murari | Radhe | Special appearancei In the song "Gopala Baa"|| | |
| 2017 | Pushpaka Vimana | Puttalakshmi | | |
| 2017 | Bharjari | Gowri | | |
| 2017 | Rishibhapriya | Herself | Short film; also producer | |
| 2018 | Johnny Johnny Yes Papa | Priya | | |
| 2018 | Ayogya | Nandini | | |
| 2018 | The Villain | Herself | Special appearance | |
| 2019 | Seetharama Kalyana | Geetha | | |
| 2019 | Natasaarvabhowma | Sakshi | | |
| 2019 | Amar | Herself | Special appearance | |
| 2019 | I Love You | Dharmika | | |
| 2019 | Rustum | Rachana | | |
| 2019 | Bharaate | Herself | Special appearance | |
| 2019 | Ayushman Bhava | Lakshmi | | |
| 2021 | 100 | Hima | | |
| 2021 | Love You Rachchu | Rachchu | | |
| 2022 | Super Machi | Meenakshi | Telugu film | |
| 2022 | Ek Love Ya | Swathi | | |
| 2022 | James | Herself | Special appearance | |
| 2022 | Monsoon Raaga | Asma Begum | | |
| 2023 | Kranti | Usha | | |
| 2023 | Veeram | Dhatri | | |
| 2023 | Bad Manners | Veena | | |
| 2024 | Matinee | Akshara | | |
| 2025 | Sanju Weds Geetha 2 | Geetha | | |
| 2025 | Coolie | Kalyani Dilip | Tamil film | |
| 2026 | Landlord | Ningavva | | |
| 2026 | Cult | Ithi | | |
| 2026 | Ayogya 2 | Nandini | | |
| 2026 | Shabari Searching For Ravana † | TBA | Completed | |
| 2026 | Love Me Or Hate Me † | TBA | Completed | |
| 2026 | Kaaka | | Filming | |

=== Television ===
List of television roles
| Year | Title | Role | Notes | Ref. |
|---|---|---|---|---|
| 2011 | Benkiyalli Aralida Hoovu | | | |
| 2012 | Arasi | Rashmi | Lead role | |
| 2016 | Kick | Judge | | |
| 2017–2018 | Comedy Talkies | Judge | | |
| 2018–2021 | Majabharatha | Judge | | |
| 2022 | Drama Juniors | Judge | Season 4 | |
| 2022–2023 | Super Queen | Judge | | |
| 2023–present | Bharjari Bachelors | Judge | | |

=== Music videos ===
| Year | Title | Singer | Ref. |
|---|---|---|---|
| 2016 | "Kalidaasa Kannada Meshtru" | Arjun Itagi, Sanvi Shetty, Gunashree, Hitaishi, Neha Pallavi, Rahul Chinna | |
| 2021 | "Laka Laka Lambargini" | Chandan Shetty | |

== Awards and nominations ==
| Year | Award | Category | Film | Result | Ref. |
|---|---|---|---|---|---|
| 2014 | Filmfare Awards South | Best Actress – Kannada | Bulbul | Nominated | |
| 2016 | Filmfare Awards South | Best Actress – Kannada | Ranna | Nominated | |
| 2016 | Filmfare Awards South | Critics Best Actress – Kannada | Ranna | Won | |
| 2016 | South Indian International Movie Awards | Best Actress – Kannada | Ranna | Won | |
| 2019 | South Indian International Movie Awards | Best Actress – Kannada | Ayogya | Won | |
| 2021 | South Indian International Movie Awards | Best Actress – Kannada | Ayushman Bhava | Won | |
| 2022 | South Indian International Movie Awards | Best Actress – Kannada | Love You Rachchu | Nominated | |
| 2023 | South Indian International Movie Awards | Best Actress – Kannada | Monsoon Raaga | Nominated | |
| 2024 | Filmfare Awards South | Best Actress – Kannada | Monsoon Raaga | Nominated | |
| 2024 | South Indian International Movie Awards | Best Actress – Kannada | Kranti | Nominated | |
| 2025 | South Indian International Movie Awards | Best Actress – Kannada | Matinee | Nominated | |

== See also ==
- List of Indian film actresses
