= Rangayana Raghu =

Indian theatre, film actor

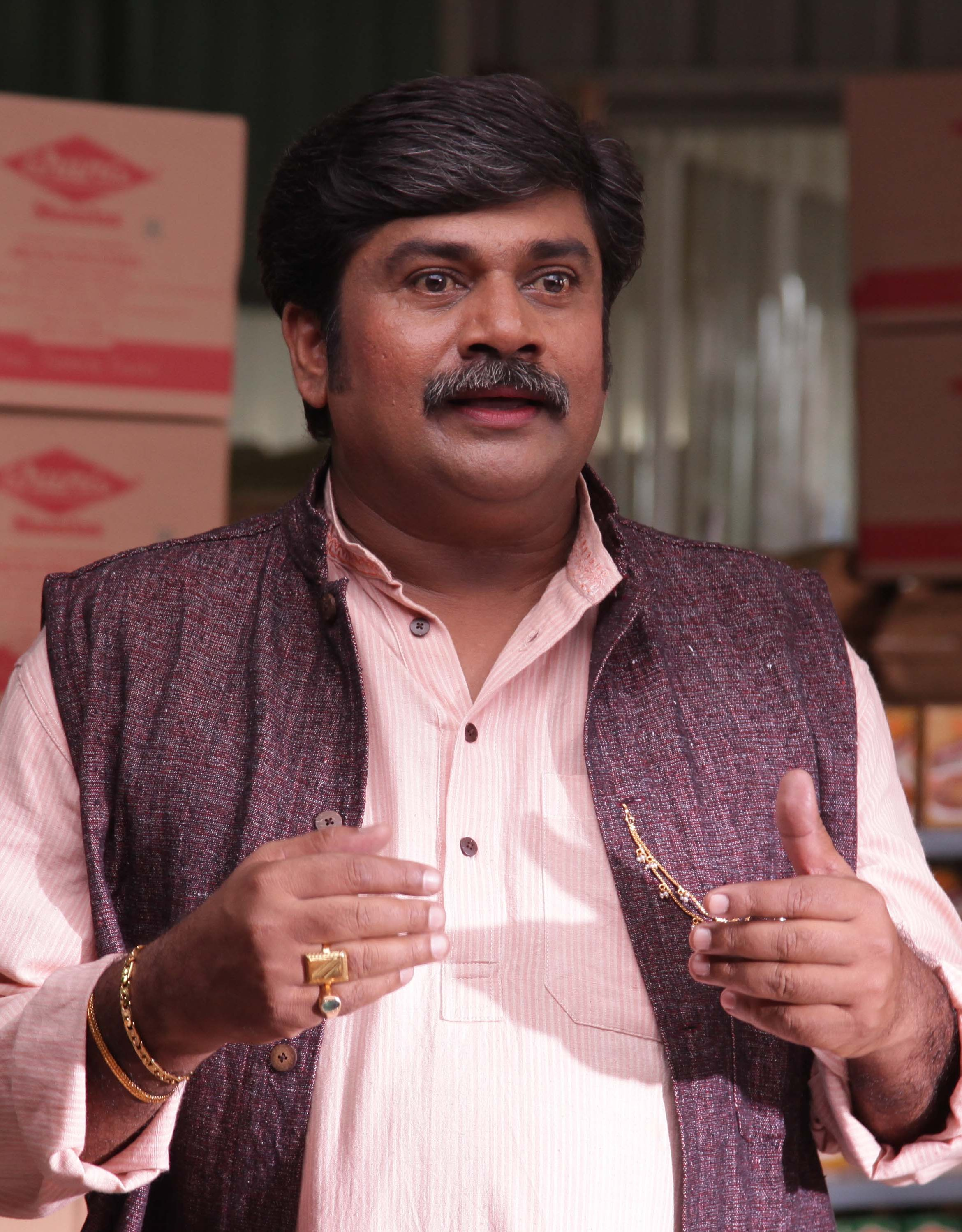
- Raghu during the filming of Ishtakamya, 2015
- Born: 17 April 1965 (age 61); Koththuru, Pavagada, Tumkur, Mysore State (now Karnataka), India
- Occupation: Actor
- Years active: 1995–present
- Spouse: Mangala (m. 1998)
- Children: 1

Koththuru Chikkarangappa Raghunath (born 17 April 1965), known by his screen name Rangayana Raghu, is an Indian film and stage actor, known for his work in Kannada cinema. He is a recipient of multiple Filmfare Awards South, SIIMA Awards, and two Karnataka State Film Awards.

Born in Koththuru, a village in the Tumkur district of the erstwhile Mysore State (now Karnataka), to a Bayalaata artist, Raghu was inspired to act as a teenager. He began his career in theatre and worked as a stage actor with B. V. Karanth's theatre group Rangayana, from 1988 to 1999. His first feature film, Suggi, got shelved, and Bhoomi Thayiya Chochchala Maga (1998) was his first release. During the initial phase of his career, Raghu usually portrayed comedic or negative-shaded characters and played supporting roles. His first major break came when he appeared as an antagonist in Dhumm (2002). He is best noted for his performance in the 2007 film Duniya which won him his second Karnataka State Film Award for Best Supporting Actor. His other notable roles during this period came in Ranga SSLC (2004), Suntaragaali (2006), Cyanide (2006), Raam (2009), Olave Mandara (2011) and Jayammana Maga (2013).

Later, Raghu progressed to play more character and lead roles, while also appearing frequently in comedic roles. He became noted for his versatility, and earned praise for his performances in films such as Badava Rascal (2021), Family Pack (2022), Rangasamudra (2024), Shakhahaari (2024) and Premada Oorali (2026) He has appeared in more than 400 films.

== Early life ==
Raghu was born as Kotturu Chikkarangappa Raghunath on 17 April 1965 as the ninth child of Chikkarangaiah and Veeramma, in a village Kotturu, in Pavagada taluk of the Tumkur district of the erstwhile Mysore State (now Karnataka). His father Chikkarangaiah was an agriculturist and folk artist who played Bayalaata. Raghu completed his schooling and college education in National College, Bangalore, where he developed an interest in acting. He was encouraged to act in plays by Rajashekhar, the son of noted playwright, Chandrashekhara Kambara. He also referred Raghu to the theatre institute, Rangayana in Mysore in 1988.

== Career ==
Raghu trained as an actor in Rangayana before joining films in the mid-1990s. He last performed on stage in 2001. In 2004, he started the theatre group, Sanchari, with his wife, Mangala.

Raghu made his film debut in the 1995 Kannada-language film Suggi directed by Hamsalekha that eventually got shelved. His first release was Bhoomi Thayiya Chochchala Maga (1998), that saw him appear in a supporting role. He then appeared in the 2002 film Dhumm, which followed minor roles in Megha Banthu Megha (1998) and Aryabhata (1999). His major breakthrough was Yogaraj Bhat's debut directorial venture Mani (2003). Raghu then received praise for his performances in films like Ranga SSLC (2004), Duniya (2007), Modalasala (2010), Alemari (2012), and Director's Special (2013). Raghu made his debut in Tulu films in 2018 with My Name is Annappa.

Raghu played a respected folk artist humiliated by a wealthy man in Rangasamudra (2024), a film set in the North Karnataka region. His only grandson intends to restore his grandfather's lost self-respect by buying him a car. A. Sharadhaa of The New Indian Express wrote, "Rangayana Raghu shines every time he graces the screen, as a folk artist, he exemplifies a life of dignity." In the thriller, Shakhahaari (2024), he played an innocent Subbanna Bhat, who runs a small hotel, and has to shield a man on the run who is accused of murdering his wife. The film and Raghu's performance received praise from critics. The reviewer for Deccan Herald wrote: "Veteran Rangayana Raghu is brilliant in a nuanced role demanding wholesome acting. He seamlessly traverses through varied emotions."

== Filmography ==
=== Films ===
Year	Title	Role	Ref.
1998	Bhoomi Thayiya Chochchala Maga	Patil	
1998	Megha Banthu Megha		
1999	Aryabhata		
1999	Chandrodaya	Employee fired by Sunil Kumar; uncredited role	
2001	Kothigalu Saar Kothigalu	Police officer	
2002	Dhumm	Legislator	
2003	Sri Ram	Chakratheertha	
2003	Mani	Chami	
2003	Hrudayavantha		
2004	Ranga SSLC	Kunta Naga	
2004	Dharma		
2004	Sahukara	Benkiyappa	
2004	Bhagawan	Sharath Simha	
2004	Sarvabhouma	Jayaraj	
2004	Omkara	Divya's father	
2005	Rakshasa	Cheluvaraju	
2005	Valmiki	Ballanna	
2005	Gunna	Sharma	
2005	Swamy	Constable	
2005	Boyfriend		
2005	Jootata	Mallangowda	
2006	7 O' Clock		
2006	Suntaragaali	D. Rajahuli	
2006	Shishya		
2006	Chellata	Jagadish	
2006	Honeymoon Express	Ranganath	
2006	Tirupathi	Ekanath Bhavade	
2006	Cyanide	Ranganath	
2006	Odahuttidavalu		
2006	Thangigagi	Shadeshwara	
2006	Tenali Rama		
2007	Poojari		
2007	Duniya	Satyanna	
2007	Maathaad Maathaadu Mallige	Kurupayya	
2007	Gunavantha	Gold Reddy	
2007	Parodi	Moneylender	
2007	Snehana Preethina	Raghunath Rao	
2007	Sixer	Malpe Nayaka	
2007	Geleya		
2007	Ganesha		
2008	Hani Hani		
2008	Beladingalaagi Baa		
2008	Gaalipata	Byregowda	
2008	Payana		
2008	Inthi Ninna Preethiya	"Naayi" Seenappa	
2008	Taj Mahal	Shankar	
2008	Vasanthakala		
2008	Avva	Baramanna	
2008	Dheemaku		
2008	Mast Maja Maadi	Somanath Tantri	
2008	Kodagana Koli Nungitha	Melukote	
2008	Yuga Yugagale Saagali		
2008	Minchina Ota		
2008	Sangama	Gajaraj	
2008	Athmeeya		
2008	Bidda		
2009	Rajakumari		
2009	Prem Kahani		
2009	Maleyali Jotheyali	Rangappa	
2009	Raam	Krishna Murthy	
2009	Olave Jeevana Lekkachaara	Ratna	
2009	Junglee	Gudde Narasimha	
2009	Mr. Painter		
2009	Nanda		
2009	Kallara Santhe	Chief Minister of Karnataka	
2009	Rajani	Bobby	
2009	Kannadada Kiran Bedi		
2009	Gubbachchigalu		
2009	Muniya		
2010	Jokali		
2010	Appu and Pappu	Jogi Chan	
2010	Ullasa Utsaha	Raghupati	
2010	Mylari		
2010	Shankar IPS		
2010	Gubbi	Gowda	
2010	Hendtheer Darbar		
2010	Sanchari		
2010	Huli		
2010	Rame Gowda vs Krishna Reddy	Krishna Reddy	
2010	Kari Chirathe		
2010	Gang Leader		
2010	Antharathma	Ghost	
2010	Dildar		
2010	Hoo		
2010	Tsunami		
2010	Modalasala	Deepu's father	
2010	Jackie	Meese Bheemanna	
2010	Kiccha Huccha		
2010	Eradane Maduve		
2010	Gandedhe	"SMS"	
2010	Aithalakkadi	Raghu	
2010	Huduga Hudugi		
2010	Swayamvara	Col. Kenchappa	
2010	Chirru	Rajasekhar	
2011	Olave Mandara	Ratna	
2011	Happy Husband		
2011	Rama Rama Raghurama	Raghurama	
2011	Kaanchaana		
2011	Idonthara Love Story		
2011	Kaalgejje		
2011	Rajani		
2011	Ee Sanje		
2011	Kool: Sakkath Hot Maga		
2011	Veerabahu	"Amavasye"	
2011	Saarathi	Raja's adoptive father	
2011	Kannadi		
2011	Lakshmi		
2011	Alemari	Devu's father	
2011	Devadas		
2011	Tyagu		
2011	Swayam Krushi		
2011	Auto Manja		
2011	Johny Mera Naam Preethi Mera Kaam	"Maamu"	
2011	Swamiji		
2011	Sanju Weds Geetha	Saasa	
2011	O Manase		
2011	Gun	Wasim Khan	
2011	Hudugaru	Kodanda	
2011	Manase Mandaram		
2011	Thathaasthu		
2011	Belgaum		
2011	Tirugubothu		
2011	Prince	Raghunath	
2011	Boss	Nandu	
2011	Tumba Ishta Swalpa Kashta		
2011	90		
2011	Paramathma	Raghava	
2011	Jarasandha	Bull Naidu	
2011	Shyloo		
2012	Ko Ko		
2012	Tsunami		
2012	Chingari		
2012	Alemari		
2012	Anna Bond	Chapathi Babu	
2012	Breaking News	Managing director of Do Company	
2012	Villain		
2012	Jaanu		
2012	Dandupalya		
2012	Shiva	Panduranga Shetty	
2012	Romeo	Kashinath	
2012	Rambo	Mangalore Annappa	
2012	Kalaya Tasmai Namaha		
2012	Mr. 420	Ranganath	
2012	Super Shastri		
2013	Lakshmi	"Deal" Raja	
2013	Topiwala	Ramanayana Raghu	
2013	CID Eesha	Narasimha	
2013	Aane Pataaki	Govindanna	
2013	Director's Special	Panche Shastry / Ramachandra	
2013	Kaddipudi	Jinke	
2013	Mahanadi		
2013	Mangana Kaiyalli Manikya	Prabhu	
2013	Case No. 18/9	Revanna	
2013	Jayammana Maga	Bhagavanta	
2013	Shathru	Adisesha	
2013	Chaddi Dosth	Ranganna	
2014	Brahma	"Lucky Man"	
2014	Crazy Star		
2014	Dil Rangeela	Tony D'Costa	
2014	Manada Mareyalli		
2014	Agraja		
2014	Gajakesari	Agni	
2014	Preethi Geethi Ityaadi		
2014	24 Carat		
2014	Power ***	P. V. Bhushan	
2015	Jackson		
2015	Krishna-Leela	Chandrashekar	
2015	Nagaari		
2015	Rana Vikrama		
2015	Daksha		
2015	Goolihatti	Mylari	
2015	Bullet Basya		
2015	Dove		
2015	Ganga		
2015	Ramleela	Mekedatu Papanna	
2015	Sharpshooter		
2016	Parapancha	Mountbatten Tippi	
2016	U the End A		
2016	Kala Bhairava		
2016	The Great Story of Sodabuddi		
2016	Chakravyuha	ACP Raghu	
2016	Akira	Gun Guddappa	
2016	Ishtakamya		
2016	Style King	Naga	
2016	Mr. Mommaga	Ravi's grandfather	
2016	Brahma Vishnu Maheshwara		
2016	Crazy Boy	Arjun's adopted father	
2016	Lifeu Super		
2016	Golisoda		
2016	Doddmane Hudga	Nanjunda	
2016	Dana Kayonu	"Subsidy"	
2016	Idolle Ramayana	Inspector Ramdas	
2016	Nagarahavu		
2016	Madha Mathu Manasi		
2016	Naanu Mattu Varalakshmi	Munna's father	
2016	Sundaranga Jaana	Anjaneya	
2017	Lee		
2017	Mumbai		
2017	Melkote Manja		
2017	Smile Please	Sadananda	
2017	Raajakumara	Venky	
2017	Jani		
2017	Mugulu Nage	Raghu	
2018	Garuda		
2018	Kanaka		
2018	O Premave		
2018	Gultoo	Anantharamaiah	
2018	Johnny Johnny Yes Papa	Pappa	
2018	Saaguva Daariyalli		
2018	Hyper		
2018	Kannadakkagi Ondannu Otthi		
2018	Aa Karaala Ratri	Muthanna	
2018	Atharva		
2018	Loudspeaker		
2018	Ayogya		
2018	My Name is Annappa		
2018	Aadi Purana		
2018	Jagath Kiladi		
2018	Orange	Giddappa	
2018	Paradesi C/o London	Kenche Gowda	
2019	Girgitle		
2019	Missing Boy	Lavakumar	
2019	Panchatantra	Ranganna	
2019	Yaana		
2019	Dasharatha		
2019	Ayushman Bhava	Raghu	
2019	Bharaate	Patela	
2019	Sarvajanikarige Suvarnavakasha	Shiva	
2020	Drona	Raghu	
2020	French Biriyani	Mahadev	
2021	Ramarjuna	Peter	
2021	Inspector Vikram	ACP Prathap Mishra	
2021	Yuvarathnaa	Staff member in college	
2021	Puksatte Lifu		
2021	Mugilpete		
2021	Sakath	Chalapathi	
2021	Badava Rascal	Rangegowda	
2022	James	Rakesh Kumar Pirangi	
2022	Gaalipata 2	Bhairegowda	
2022	Family Pack	Manjunath/Manjanna	
2022	Wheelchair Romeo	Jack Mama	
2023	Love Birds		
2023	Gowli	Kakka	
2023	Melody Drama		
2023	Kousalya Supraja Rama	Siddegowda	
2023	Tagaru Palya	Pandappa aka Pandu	
2024	Rangasamudra	Rangasamudra	
2024	Case of Kondana	ASI Tyagaraj	
2024	Just Pass	Dalavayi	
2024	Shakhahaari	Mastikatte Subramanya "Subbanna" Bhat	
2024	Karataka Damanaka	Mugellappa	
2024	Dilkush		
2024	Night Curfew	Police Inspector	
2024	Moorane Krishnappa	Veeranna	
2024	Kotee	Ramanna	
2024	The Judgement		
2024	Krishnam Pranaya Sakhi	Bhoomdevru	
2024	Bhairadevi	Veeraiah	
2025	Sanju Weds Geetha 2		
2025	Forest	Makalpatti Gopalaswamy	
2025	Royal		
2025	Manada Kadalu		
2025	Vidyapati		
2025	Agnyathavasi	Inspector Govindu	
2025	S/O Muthanna	Muthanna	
2025	Full Meals	Pulakeshi	
2025	Flirt		
2025	Marutha		
2026	Cult		
2026	Sarala Subbarao	Narasimha Shastry	
	JC The University		
	Premada ooralli	Naganna	
	Hulibeera		
	Rolex		

=== Web series ===
Year	Title	Role	Ref
2025	Maarigallu	Mari Gowda	

== Awards and nominations ==
Karnataka State Film Awards

- 2003–04: Karnataka State Film Award for Best Supporting Actor: Mani
- 2006–07: Karnataka State Film Award for Best Supporting Actor: Duniya

Filmfare Awards South

- Won; 2006: Filmfare Award for Best Supporting Actor – Kannada: Cyanide
- Won; 2024: Filmfare Award for Best Supporting Actor – Kannada: Tagaru Palya
- Nominated; 2009: Filmfare Award for Best Supporting Actor – Kannada: Raam
- Nominated; 2010:Filmfare Award for Best Supporting Actor – Kannada: Modalasala
- Nominated; 2011:Filmfare Award for Best Supporting Actor – Kannada: Olave Mandara
- Nominated; 2013:Filmfare Award for Best Supporting Actor – Kannada: Jayammana Maga
- Nominated; 2024: Filmfare Award for Best Actor - Kannada: Shakhahaari

South Indian International Movie Awards

- 2011: Best Actor in a Negative Role (Kannada): Sanju Weds Geetha
- 2012: Best Actor in a Supporting Role (Kannada): Romeo
- 2021: Best Actor in a Negative Role (Kannada): Drona
- 2021: Best Comedian (Kannada): French Biriyani
- 2012: Best Comedian (Kannada): Shiva
- 2013: Best Comedian (Kannada): Jayammana Maga
- 2015: Best Comedian (Kannada): Power***
- 2016: Best Comedian (Kannada): Rana Vikrama
- 2022: Best Comedian (Kannada): Badava Rascal
- Nominated; 2025: Best Actor (Kannada): Shakhahaari

Udaya Film Awards

- 2010: Best Supporting Actor
- 2012: Best Comedian: Mr. 420

Suvarna Film Awards

- 2007: Best Supporting Actor: Duniya
- 2009: Best Supporting Actor: Modalasala

IIFA Utsavam

- 2015Best Performance In A Supporting Role – Male (Kannada): Krishna Leela
- 2015:Best Performance In A Comic Role (Kannada): Rana Vikrama

Innovative Film Awards

- 2010: Best Supporting Actor
