= Monsoon Raaga =

2022 Indian Kannada-language film

- Directed by: S. Ravindranath
- Story by: Venkatesh Maha
- Based on: C/o Kancharapalem (Telugu) by Venkatesh Maha
- Produced by: A. R. Vikhyath
- Starring: Dhanajaya; Rachita Ram
- Cinematography: S. K. Rao
- Edited by: Harish Komme
- Music by: J. Anoop Seelin
- Production company: Vikhyath Chitra Productions
- Release date: 16 September 2022
- Running time: 142 minutes
- Country: India
- Language: Kannada

Monsoon Raaga is a 2022 Indian Kannada-language drama film directed by S Ravindranath. It is a remake of the Telugu film, C/o Kancharapalem (2018), featuring Dhanajaya and Rachita Ram. The music is composed by J. Anoop Seelin. The film is produced by A R Vikhyath through Vikhyath Chitra Productions. It received positive reviews

== Cast ==
- Dhanajaya as Katte, who works at a wine store
- Rachita Ram as Asma Begum, a sex worker
- Yasha Shivakumar as Raga Sudha, a Brahmin girl
- Achyuth Kumar as Raju, a bachelor who later marries Hasini
- Suhasini Maniratnam as Hasini, a widow and has a 20-year-old daughter
- Nihal as Sundara
- Sinchana Koteshwar as Suchitra
- Nitesh Nittur as Gopinath
- Viraaj as Dhorey

== Release ==
The film was released on 16 September 2022. The digital streaming rights were acquired by ZEE5 and was premiered on 9 December 2022.

== Reception ==
Sharadhaa of The New Indian Express gave a rating of 3 out of 5 and wrote that "Monsoon Raaga is a slow-moving film that does create some confusion in the beginning, however, the characters steal the show. In a nutshell, Monsoon Raaga makes for a realistic experience for romantic hearts". While comparing it with the original film, Shivani Kava of The News Minute wrote: "This slice-of-life drama remains a notch below the original". Echoing the same, Muralidhara Khajane of The Hindu wrote: "Despite commendable performances by the cast, the Kannada remake of ‘C/o Kancharapalem’ has been visualised with pure commercial interest, lacking the charm of the original".
