= Haage Summane =

- Film poster
- Directed by: Preetham Gubbi
- Written by: Preetham Gubbi
- Screenplay by: Preetham Gubbi
- Produced by: Murali Mohan; Pramod; Santosh
- Starring: Kiran Srinivas; Suhasi
- Cinematography: Krishna
- Edited by: Deepu S. Kumar
- Music by: Mano Murthy
- Production companies: Dharma Pictures; Zee Motion Pictures
- Distributed by: Jayanna films
- Release date: 26 December 2008
- Running time: 135 minutes
- Country: India
- Language: Kannada

Haage Summane (transl. Just Like That) is a 2008 Kannada-language film directed by Preetham Gubbi. Kiran Srinivas and Suhasi played the lead roles. Music was composed by Mano Murthy. The film released nationwide on 26 December 2008. The film's title is based on a lyric from "Anisuthide" from Mungaru Male (2006).

== Cast ==
- Kiran Srinivas as Preetham
- Suhasi Dhami as Khushi
- Pooja Gandhi (cameo appearance)
- Cudavalli Chandrashekar
- Sarath Babu

== Soundtrack ==
The film has six songs composed by Mano Murthy with the lyrics penned by Jayant Kaikini.

Haage Summane

Soundtrack album by Mano Murthy
- Released: 11 October 2008
- Recorded: Anand Audio
- Length: 29:47
- Language: Kannada
- Label: Anand Audio
- Producer: Murali Mohan, Pramod, Santosh

Sl No	Song title	Singer(s)	Duration	Lyrics
1	"Haage Summane"	Sonu Nigam	04:53	Jayanth Kaikini
2	"Oorella Koogi"	Keshav Prasad, Supriya	04:41	Jayanth Kaikini
3	"Haadonave"	Kunal Ganjawala, Sunidhi Chauhan	04:38	Jayanth Kaikini
4	"Odi Bandenu"	Sonu Nigam	05:11	Jayanth Kaikini
5	"Odi Bandenu"	Shreya Ghoshal	05:11	Jayanth Kaikini
6	"Nanenu Nambodilla"	Udit Narayan, Shreya Ghoshal	05:17	Jayanth Kaikini

== Reception ==
=== Critical response ===
R G Vijayasarathy of Rediff.com scored the film at 3 out of 5 stars and wrote "Newcomers Kiran and Suhasi are the find of the season. Both look good on screen and prove that they can act. Yesteryear hero Edakallu Guddadhamele Chandrashekhar and Sharath Babu do well. Yamuna is a good choice for the role of heroine's mother. Haage Summane is a candyfloss love story, worth a watch". A critic from Bangalore Mirror wrote "Sharat Babu and K S L Swamee are wasted in their roles. Excessive viewing of chocolate -faced Kiran and Suhasi in the film may put you off good-looking people for sometime".

== Awards ==
- Filmfare Awards South for Best Cinematographer S Krishna.
