= Ayushman Bhava (2019 film) =

2019 Kannada language film by P Vasu

- Official poster
- Directed by: P. Vasu
- Screenplay by: P. Vasu; V. Nagendra Prasad
- Story by: P. Vasu
- Produced by: B. S. Dwarakish; Yogish Dwarakish Bunggale & Alankar Pandian
- Starring: Shiva Rajkumar; Ananth Nag; Rachita Ram; Prabhu
- Cinematography: P. K. H. Das
- Edited by: Gautham Raju
- Music by: Gurukiran
- Production companies: Dwarakish Chitra & Invenio Origin
- Distributed by: Jayanna Films
- Release date: 15 November 2019
- Running time: 145 minutes
- Country: India
- Language: Kannada

Ayushman Bhava (transl. Long Live) is a 2019 Indian Kannada-language action drama film directed by P. Vasu and produced by B. S. Dwarakish and Yogish Dwarakish Bunggale, co-produced by Alankar Pandian. The film stars Shiva Rajkumar, Ananth Nag, Rachita Ram, and Prabhu along with Nidhi Subbaiah in a special appearance. The music was composed by Gurukiran. The cinematography and editing were handled by PKH Das and Gowtham Raju respectively.

The film was scheduled to be released on 1 November 2019, but was postponed to 15 November 2019.

== Plot ==
Gopi is the head of a joint family consisting of his three sons, their wives, and children. When his family decides to punish him by not speaking to him due to his consumption of alcohol, he advertises for a caretaker. Later, the family apologises and he forgives them. Gopi's granddaughter, Sridevi, has her engagement. Krishna arrives with Sridevi's fiancée's family and wins everyone's hearts with his friendliness. When it is revealed that Krishna has come in response to Gopi's advertisement for a caretaker, Gopi immediately hires him.

Lakshmi, Gopi's other granddaughter, became mentally unstable after witnessing the death of her parents, Devaki and Vasudeva, three years ago. She lives in the outhouse. Krishna befriends Lakshmi, who later begins to recover. After Sridevi's wedding, the family decides to marry Lakshmi to Chetan, her cross-cousin, who is primarily interested in inheriting her wealth. Krishna suggests that they wait to arrange her marriage until she has fully recovered, but he is rebuked. The next day, it is discovered that Krishna has fled with Lakshmi. With the help of a boatwoman named Chukki, they reach a music college.

Through music, Krishna helps Lakshmi, who loves it, regain her stability. Eventually, they return to the joint family. After initially beating him up, the family apologises when they find out that Lakshmi has fully recovered. Lakshmi is informed about her upcoming wedding. While she believes that Krishna is the groom, the family has chosen Chetan instead. Krishna leaves the house, and Lakshmi is shocked, returning to the outhouse. One of Gopi's friends reveals details about Krishna's past.

Past: Krishna's real name is Shivaram Krishna, and he is the son of a hospital chairman named Ram Kumar. One day, a wealthy businessman dies in the hospital, and the blame falls on Krishna's hospital. Krishna later discovers that the businessman was actually killed by his partners. He manages to obtain evidence and decides to hand it over to the CBI. The businessman's partners learn of this and send their henchman to kill him on the train. However, the henchman instead kills Lakshmi's parents, who had exchanged their seats with Krishna. Upon discovering that this incident has driven Lakshmi to insanity, a guilt-ridden Krishna seeks the help of Gopi's friend to take him to her house, so that he can assist in treating her illness.

Present: Gopi calls Ram Kumar and reveals everything, only to later discover that Krishna has left for Europe. However, Krishna arrives at Gopi's house and plays the tune of Lakshmi's song on the piano. Lakshmi meets Krishna, who refuses to take her with him, as she has a loving family and cannot leave them. Gopi intervenes and sends Lakshmi with Krishna, telling him that she is not abandoning her family; rather, Krishna has joined their family.

== Cast ==
- Shiva Rajkumar as Krishna
- Ananth Nag as Gopi, Lakshmi's grandfather
- Rachita Ram as Lakshmi
- Prabhu as Ram Kumar, Krishna's father
- Suhasini Maniratnam
- Sadhu Kokila
- Ramesh Bhat
- Rangayana Raghu as Astrologist Raghu
- Yashwanth Shetty as Chethan
- Nidhi Subbaiah as Chukki
- Jai Jagadish as Lakshmi's father
- Sudha Belawadi as Lakshmi's mother
- Arohita Gowda
- Anantha Velu
- Giri Dwarakish
- Sundar Ram
- Veena Sundar
- Swapna Raj
- Lakshmi Siddayya
- Rajesh Nataranga
- Babu Hirannayya
- Neenasam Ashwath
- Mahesh Raj
- Nitesh Nittur

== Soundtrack ==
Ayushman Bhava

Soundtrack album by Gurukiran
- Released: 8 October 2019
- Recorded: 2019
- Genre: Feature film soundtrack
- Language: Kannada
- Label: DGK Audio

Gurukiran chronology
Amma I Love You (2018)	Ayushman Bhava (2019)

This is composer Guru Kiran's 100th film. Lyrics are by Santosh Naik and V. Nagendra Prasad.

Track list
No.	Title	Lyrics	Singer(s)	Length
1.	"Krishna Nee"	Santosh Naik	Anuradha Bhat	1:39
2.	"Thakita Thakita"	Santosh Naik	Vyasa Raj	3:49
3.	"Sara Sara"	V. Nagendra Prasad	Vijay Prakash	4:18
4.	"Magic Ide Nannalli"	V. Nagendra Prasad	Revanth	3:44
5.	"Thembare Bottuvana"	V. Nagendra Prasad	Sonu Kakkar	3:44
6.	"Payana Saagali"	Kaviraj	Siddhartha Belmannu, Ajay Warriar, Shrunti Tumkur	4:10
7.	"Body Percussion Theme"			1:36

== Release ==
The film was scheduled to be released on 1 November 2019, coinciding with Karnataka Rajyotsava day. It was later postponed to 15 November due to production and technical reasons.

== Critical reception ==
Sunayana Suresh of The Times of India rated the film 3.5/5 stars and wrote, "While the film has a few roadblocks, it does have a lot of entertainment, which ranges from sentimental scenes to comedy to romance." A. Sharadhaa of The New Indian Express gave it 3.5/5 stars and wrote, "Ayushman Bhava is a film that can attract all kinds of audiences, including ardent followers of Vasu’s kind of subjects, especially films like Apthamitra, and Aptharakshaka." Manjula of The Hans India gave it 3.5/5 and wrote, "The songs just complement the movie plot. Even though Ayushman Bhava is a clean movie, there are certain parts that seemed unnecessary and tests the patience of the audience."

Aravind Shwetha of The News Minute wrote, "Overall, Ayushman Bhava is a typical P Vasu film and the team seems to have succumbed to the director’s way of working. [...] If age-old formulaic movies are what you love, Ayushman Bhava may just work for you." Vivek M. V. of Deccan Herald wrote, "Despite being a copy, ‘Apthamitra’ worked because it was highly entertaining, but ‘Aayushmanbhava’ is painfully bland and completely predictable."

== Awards and nominations ==
In 9th South Indian International Movie Awards movie got 2 nominations.

- won the Best Actress - Rachita Ram
- nominated, Best supporting actress -Nidhi Subbaiah
