= Matinee (2024 film) =

Kannada movie directed by Simple Suni

- Theatrical release poster
- Directed by: Manohar Kaampalli
- Written by: Manohar Kaampalli
- Produced by: Parvathi S. Gowda
- Starring: Sathish Ninasam; Rachita Ram; Aditi Prabhudeva; Nagabhushana
- Cinematography: Sudhakar S. Raj
- Edited by: K M Prakash
- Music by: Poornachandra Tejaswi
- Production company: F3 Productions
- Distributed by: Chandan Films
- Release date: 5 April 2024
- Country: India
- Language: Kannada

Matinee is a 2024 Indian Kannada-language comedy horror film written and directed by Manohar Kaampalli in his debut. The film is produced by Parvathi S. Gowda under F3 Productions banner. The film features Sathish Ninasam, Rachita Ram and Aditi Prabhudeva in the lead roles besides Nagabhushana, Shivaraj K. R. Pete, Poornachandra Mysore and Diganth Diwakar in supporting roles. The film's score and soundtrack are composed by Poornachandra Tejaswi, while the cinematography is by Sudhakar S. Raj, with editing by KM Prakash.

The film was released on 5 April 2024 and opened to mixed reviews from critics and audience criticizing the film for its predictable storyline.

== Plot ==
Arun is from an affluent family and is an owner of a haunted property. His friends, after multiple attempts, convince him to sell the property with a motive of looting him after the deal. They make an entry to the haunted house and are spooked by haunting sounds of anklets and noises. The hatched plan backfires upon the friends. The friends gradually understand that Arun is a ghost and Arun confesses he had love with akshara but akshara was missing for many days and suddenly appears and told she passed German test and will go to Germany but Arun disagree telling she used to tell she used to tell she cannot leave him and now suddenly taken decisions to get to Germany, now akshara gets angry and tells that he thinks only for him and she leaves. After akshara enters an auto and go Arun tries to call back akshara but slips from the top floor to ground and gets dead. Arun wished to tell one last word sorry to akshara as he still loves her but he cannot and one day when his friends enter the house Arun finds that his friends can hear him and also touch them so Arun request his friends to bring akshara to fulfil his last wish. Akshara comes to the house and Arun tells sorry and tells he loves her and the house is for akshara and disappear. One friend now tells akshara is a big cheat by pretending love to many boys as he comes to know from the ashramam. Akshara become furious telling she is after money and now as house belongs to her everybody should get out and the friends comes out angrily. Akshara looking a wall photo of Arun tells she loved the house and the house was built by his mother only, now Arun face changes in the photo becomes red and appears to akshara telling he won't leave her and starts shutting all the doors and windows, akshara runs to exit and waves hand at one friend but the door shuts. The friends now tell among each other they should not get selfish in the name of real estate business.

== Cast ==
- Sathish Ninasam as Arun
- Rachita Ram as Akshara
- Aditi Prabhudeva as Chithra
- Nagabhushana as Nixon
- Shivaraj K R Pete as Naveen
- Poornachandra Mysore as Anand
- Diganth Diwakar as Jayadev
- Thulasi Shivamani
- Sudha Belawadi
- Tabla Nani
- Mimicry Gopi
- Sunethra Pandith
- Prakash Thuminad
- Chillar Manju

== Production ==
Manohar Kaampalli, who previously worked as an assistant to Ram Gopal Varma in Killing Veerappan, announced that he would be debuting as director for two films in January 2020. He also announced that both his projects will be produced by F3 Productions. Posters of the films along with their titles had been released and announced the filming to be started the next year. Actors Sathish Ninasam and Rachita Ram were onboarded, pairing second time after the successful film Ayogya (2019). The pair started to shoot for the film on 24 March 2021.

== Soundtrack ==
Matinee

Soundtrack album by Poornachandra Tejaswi
- Released: 2024
- Recorded: 2024
- Genre: Feature film soundtrack
- Label: Anand Audio
- Producer: Poornachandra Tejaswi

Poornachandra Tejaswi has composed the film's background and scored for its soundtrack. He has also written the lyrics for two songs.

Track listing
No.	Title	Lyrics	Artist(s)	Length
1.	"Sanje Mele"	Poornachandra Tejaswi	Vijay Prakash	04:54
2.	"Ninagage Midiyivudu"	Hemanth Kumar Ganjam	Sadhvini Koppa	06:08
3.	"Baaro Baaro Bottle Thaaro"	Poornachandra Tejaswi	Poornachandra Tejaswi, Sathish Ninasam, Real Ranna	4:18

== Reception ==
Vinay Lokesh of The Times of India said that “Matinee is an honest attempt by debutante director Manohar. It blends horror, comedy, romance, and friendship with a touch of betrayal.” Sujay B M of Deccan Herald said that “Despite being stretched out, ‘Matinee’ succeeds in entertaining the audience with timely twists and turns. However, under-developed characters and lack of an intriguing plot line derails the film from standing out in the genre.”

== Release ==
The film was released across Karnataka on 5 April 2024. Chandan Films distributed the film throughout the state.
