= Kiss (2019 film) =

Indian romantic comedy drama film

- Theatrical release poster
- Directed by: A. P. Arjun
- Written by: A. P. Arjun
- Produced by: A. P. Arjun
- Starring: Viraat; Sreeleela
- Narrated by: Dhruva Sarja
- Cinematography: Arjun Shetty
- Edited by: Deepu S Kumar
- Music by: V. Harikrishna; Adi Hari
- Production company: A. P. Arjun Films
- Release date: 27 September 2019
- Running time: 148 minutes
- Country: India
- Language: Kannada

Kiss is a 2019 Indian Kannada-language romantic comedy drama film directed by A. P. Arjun and produced by V. Ravi Kumar under Rashtrakuta Pictures. It is the second Kannada-language film after A 2nd Hand Lover (2015) to be inspired by the 2004 South Korean film 100 Days with Mr. Arrogant. The film features debutantes Viraat and Sreeleela, alongside Chikkanna, Sadhu Kokila, and H. G. Dattatreya.

Kiss was released on 27 September 2019 to mixed reviews from critics and became a commercial success at the box office. The film was partially reshot in Tamil as Kiss Me Idiot in 2025, starring Robo Shankar and Nanjil Vijayan.

== Synopsis ==
Nandini, an architecture student, damages the car of Arjun, the son of a multi-millionaire. Unable to pay for the damage, Nandini is asked to sign an agreement to work for Arjun for 72 days or give him two kisses. Nandini prefers the work option and accordingly, cleans his house, takes care of his dog, serves his friends at parties, and so on. An incident makes Nandini realize that Arjun is not the arrogant guy she assumed, and she soon develops feelings for him. As their 72-day agreement draws to a close, Nandini keeps her feelings to herself and departs Arjun's house in sadness. After a few days, Arjun realizes that he has fallen in love with Nandini and follows her to Ooty, where he proposes to her, but she rejects him. Arjun pursues Nandini, who proceeds to give him the cold shoulder, even humiliating him in the hospital, where she is recuperating after a vicious attack by goons. A heartbroken Arjun is about to depart Ooty, but Nandini catches up to him. She confesses that she was testing him to see whether he truly loved her, and she proposes to him. The couple finally share their first kiss.

== Cast ==
- Viraat as Arjun
- Sreeleela as Nandini
- Avinash as Arjun's father
- Chikkanna as Jaggi
- Sadhu Kokila as Musthafa
- H. G. Dattatreya as Nandini's PG owner
- Sundar Veena as Nandini's father
- Lakshmi Siddaiah as Nandini's mother
- Apoorva Gowda (cameo appearance in the song "Sheela Susheela")
- A. P. Arjun (cameo appearance)
- Suhasini Maniratnam as Arjun's mother (in portrait)

Tamil version

- Robo Shankar as Ticket Thanikachalam
- Nanjil Vijayan as Pound Pandi
- Ashwathi and Sham as a couple

== Production ==
Mayuri Kyatari was hired to dub for Sreeleela.

== Soundtrack ==
The soundtrack consists of songs and a background score composed by V. Harikrishna to lyrics by A. P. Arjun.

All lyrics are written by A. P. Arjun.

Kannada track listing
No.	Title	Music	Singer(s)	Length
1.	"Sheela Susheela"	V. Harikrishna	Chandan Shetty	4:07
2.	"Neene Modalu"	Adi Hari	Shreya Ghoshal	3:33
3.	"Bette Gowda V/s Chikka Boramma"	V. Harikrishna	Puneeth Rajkumar	4:10
4.	"Kanna Neeridu"	V. Harikrishna	Santhosh Venky	4:36
5.	"Samadhana"	V. Harikrishna	Naveen Sajju, V. Harikrishna	5:00
6.	"I Love You Idiot"	V. Harikrishna	Sanjith Hegde, Apoorva Sridhar	4:02
Total length:				19:20

Tamil

The lyrics were written by Manimaran. Mukesh, Raja Ganapathy, Ajay Krishna, and Punya sang the songs. Additional score at the beginning and end of the film was composed by Prakash Nikki.

Tamil track listing
No.	Title	Lyrics	Music	Singer(s)	Length
1.	"Moodu Paniya"	Manimaran	V. Harikrishna	Priyanka NK	3:12
Total length:					3:12

== Reception ==
Kiss received mixed reviews from critics. Vinay Lokesh of The Times of India wrote, "Go and watch Kiss if love stories are your cup of tea". Shyam Prasad S of Bangalore Mirror called it "A typical young romance that goes on for an extended session in what can be described as an overmuch [sic] of vanilla chocolate". Shashiprasad SM of Deccan Chronicle wrote that the film "is a good one-time watch, especially for those who simply love love stories of all kinds". A. Sharadhaa of The New Indian Express stated that "With KISS, Arjun's intention to cater to the younger generation is quite evident, and it makes for a decent one-time watch". Jagadish Angadi of Deccan Herald wrote that "Kiss is hardly even a one-time watch".
