= Naanu Mattu Varalakshmi =

- Directed by: Preetham Gubbi
- Written by: Preetham Gubbi
- Produced by: Manjunath.K; Jayanna; Bhogendra
- Starring: Prithvi; Malavika Mohanan; Prakash Raj; Madhoo
- Cinematography: Preetha Jayaraman
- Edited by: Deepu.S.Kumar
- Music by: V. Harikrishna
- Production company: Jayanna Combines
- Distributed by: Kollur Mookambika Creations
- Release date: 23 December 2016
- Running time: 137 minutes
- Country: India
- Language: Kannada

Naanu Mattu Varalakshmi (transl. Me and Varalakshmi) is a 2016 Indian Kannada-language action film written and directed by Preetham Gubbi and produced by Jayanna-Bhogendra. It stars Prithvi, the grandson of musician G. K. Venkatesh in his debut, and Malavika Mohanan in her Kannada debut. Prakash Raj, Madhoo, Charandeep and Rangayana Raghu play supporting roles. The music is composed by V. Harikrishna. The film was released on 16 December 2016.

== Cast ==
- Prithvi as Munna
- Malavika Mohanan as Varalakshmi
- Prakash Raj as Munna's crew chief
- Madhoo as Munna's crew chief's ex-wife
- Charandeep as Charan
- Rangayana Raghu as Munna's father
- Achyuth Kumar as Munna's mechanic
- Sadhu Kokila as Munna'a mechanic
- Pavitra Lokesh as Charan's girlfriend
- Ashok Sharma
- Aravind KP as Himself

== Production ==
=== Development and casting ===
After the debacle of Boxer in 2015, director-writer Preetham teamed up yet again with the producers Jayanna-Bhogendra duo and choose motocross racing as the theme for his next directorial venture. For this film, he brought in six national champions, including a couple of them with international acclaim. He also hired Vijaykumar, a professional motocross racer of many international awards, as a team coach to help with the proceedings. For the lead roles, he selected the fresh faces Prithvi and Malayalam actress Malavika Mohanan. Prithvi, the grandson of music director G. K. Venkatesh, is an engineering graduate and is trained in acting, stunts and dancing. Charandeep was chosen to play the antagonist as another racer who is an opponent to Prithvi.

=== Filming ===
The principal photography of the film officially began from 15 December 2015 in Bangalore behind Manyata Tech Park where a race track was being set up for the shoot. The crew consisted of some technically professional racers whom Preetham wanted the scene to "look authentic, since it is a tough sport and any cover-up by the technical team will show upfront." The first schedule of filming ended at Ooty. For the climax portions, Preetham chose to shoot in Sri Lanka where two tracks are meant for the bike races.

== Soundtrack ==
The soundtrack is composed by V. Harikrishna.

=== Track listing ===
No.	Title	Lyrics	Singer(s)	Length
1.	"Na Chennagidde -Reprise"	Yogaraj Bhat	Tippu, V. Harikrishna	4:28
2.	"Na Chennagidde"	Yogaraj Bhat	V. Harikrishna	4:24
3.	"Meredadide"	Jayanth Kaikini	Sonu Nigam	4:30
4.	"Nunge Nee"	Yogaraj Bhat	Santhosh Venky	4:29
5.	"Ondhalla"	A. P. Arjun	Ajay Warrier	4:25

== Reception ==
=== Critical response ===
A Sharadhaa from The New Indian Express wrote "The film which moves ahead on conversation needs a little patience, but there is racing that fills the gaps. It is left to the audience to choose the track of love or the bike race". Shyam Prasad S from Bangalore Mirror says "While a couple of characters are fleshed out to add support, the roles played by Madhoo and Prakash Rai are cardboard stuff". Sunanya Suresh from The Times of India wrote "If you like your films to be reminiscent of the good old romantic tales, this one is worth a dekko, though be prepared to invest a little patience and go without many expectations".
