= Johny Mera Naam Preethi Mera Kaam =

- Directed by: Preetam Gubbi
- Written by: N. S. Shankar [Dialogues]
- Screenplay by: Preetham Gubbi
- Story by: Preetham Gubbi
- Produced by: Jayanna; Bhogendra
- Starring: Duniya Vijay; Ramya
- Cinematography: Krishna
- Edited by: Deepu S. Kumar
- Music by: V. Harikrishna
- Distributed by: Jayanna Combines
- Release date: 3 June 2011
- Running time: 153 minutes
- Country: India
- Language: Kannada
- Box office: ₹ 4.5 crores

Johny Mera Naam Preethi Mera Kaam is a 2011 Indian Kannada-language romantic comedy film directed by Preetham Gubbi and produced by Jayanna Combines. The film stars Duniya Vijay and Ramya, alongside Rangayana Raghu, Sadhu Kokila, H. G. Dattatreya, Karthik Jayaram, Sharan and Achyuth Kumar. The music was composed by V. Harikrishna, while cinematography and editing were handled by Krishna and Deepu. S. Kumar.

A sequel titled Johnny Johnny Yes Papa was released on 30 March 2018.

== Plot ==
Johny, who runs a social service centre in Gandhinagar Colony with Maamu, falls in love with Priya, an NRI who arrives to visit her grandfather. Johny learns that Priya's father has arranged for her to marry a suitor named Preetham, but Johny breaks off the alliance. Priya reveals to Johny that she is in love with Rakesh, whom she had met online. Johny helps Priya reunite with Rakesh, but she soon discovers that Rakesh is a fraud and leaves him. Priya's father assumes that Johny has kidnapped her and has Maamu arrested, but Johny clears up the misunderstanding and sends Priya back with her father. Realising that Johny and Priya love each other, Priya's father reunites them.

== Cast ==
- Duniya Vijay as Johnny
- Ramya as Priya
- H. G. Dattatreya as Priya's grandfather
- Rangayana Raghu as Maamu
- Sharan as Preetham
- Sadhu Kokila as Dr. Halappa
- Ramesh Bhat
- Achyuth Kumar as Priya's father
- Dharma as Yakub
- Karthik Jayaram as Rakesh
- Madhu Hegde
- Nanjunda
- Shankar Bhat
- Girija Lokesh
- Jayashree
- Rakesh
- Jeshta

== Music ==
JMNPMK

Soundtrack album by V Harikrishna
- Released: 2011
- Recorded: 2011
- Genre: Feature film soundtrack
- Length: 18:43
- Language: Kannada

Official audio
- JMNPMK - Full Album on YouTube

Track listing
No.	Title	Singer(s)	Length
1.	"Diva Diva"	Priyadarshini	4:04
2.	"Shirtu Pantinali"	V. Harikrishna, Chethan Sosca	3:57
3.	"Yaava Seemeya"	Sonu Nigam	3:53
4.	"Yellavanu Heluvaase"	Sonu Nigam, Rangayana Raghu	4:11
5.	"Bhavalokada Rayabharige"	Shamita Malnad	3:18
Total length:			18:43

== Reception ==
The Times of India gave 4/5 stars and termed it as an "entertainer with lot of comedy sequences, but don’t go deep into the storyline." Shruti Indira Lakshminarayana of Rediff gave 2.5/5 stars and wrote "The film could have packed much more energy and fun given the director and his capable cast." The New Indian Express wrote "The movie is worth watching if you are interested in entertainment".
