= Deepa Sannidhi =

Indian actress

- Born: Rahasya; Chikkamagaluru, Karnataka, India
- Other name: Deepu
- Occupation: Actress
- Years active: 2011–2017
- Height: 1.68 m (5 ft 6 in)
- Parents: Shashidhar (father); Nanda (mother)

Deepa Sannidhi (born Rahasya) is an Indian former actress who mainly appears in Kannada films. She made her acting debut in the 2011 film Saarathi, which won her the Suvarna Film Award for Best Female Debut. Also she appeared in few Tamil movies.

== Personal life ==
Rahasya was born in Chikkamagalur district of Karnataka to Shashidhar and Nanda. She completed her schooling in Bangalore and is an alumna of St. Aloysius College in Mangalore.

== Career ==
Deepa Sannidhi was in her first year in Agriculture engineering when she received a film offer for Saarathi starring Darshan and dropped out of college to pursue a career in films. She also has some prior experience in modelling and has completed a one-year course in jewellery designing. During her acting career, Deepa simultaneously pursued a degree in English Literature through Distant Education.

She took part in the audition tests conducted by the Saarathi film team and was selected to play its lead role after undergoing two rounds of tests. While shooting for Saarathi, she signed her second film Paramathma alongside Puneeth Rajkumar directed by Yogaraj Bhat, which released a week after Saarathi. Paramathma went on to become a successful venture. Deepa was chosen as the Promising Newcomer Female for Saarathi and Paramathma in The Bangalore Times Film Awards 2011. Her only 2012 release was Preetham Gubbi's Jaanu. Rediff in its review called it "Deepa Sannidhi's film all the way".

In 2014, she was first seen in Endendu Ninagagi as Soumya, "a very bold, in-your-face, today's girl". She stated that the role was "quite challenging because this is not me" but that she loved playing it. In 2015, she made her Tamil film debut in Enakkul Oruvan, a remake of Kannada film Lucia, in which she reprised the character that Sruthi Hariharan did in the original. Even before her Tamil debut she signed up her next Tamil film, Vishnuvardhan's Yatchan.

In 2017, she starred in Chakravarthy alongside Darshan.

== Filmography ==
Key
†	Denotes films that have not yet been released

Year	Title	Role	Language	Notes
2011	Saarathi	Rukmini	Kannada	Suvarna Award for Best Female Debut; Bangalore Times Film Award for Most Promising Actress
2011	Paramathma	Deepa	Kannada	Nominated—Filmfare Award for Best Actress - Kannada
2012	Jaanu	Rukmini /Jaanu	Kannada	
2013	Sakkare	Neha	Kannada	
2014	Endendu Ninagagi	Sowmya	Kannada	
2015	Enakkul Oruvan	Divya	Tamil	Nominated—SIIMA Best Debut Actress
2015	Yatchan	Shwetha	Tamil	
2017	Chowka	Gowri	Kannada	
2017	Chakravarthy	Shanthi	Kannada	
