= Paramathma (film) =

- Theatrical poster
- Directed by: Yogaraj Bhat
- Written by: Yogaraj Bhat; Duniya Soori
- Produced by: Jayanna; Bhogendra
- Starring: Puneeth Rajkumar; Deepa Sannidhi; Aindrita Ray; Anant Nag
- Cinematography: Santosh Rai Pathaje
- Edited by: Deepu S. Kumar
- Music by: V. Harikrishna
- Release date: 6 October 2011
- Running time: 132 minutes
- Country: India
- Language: Kannada
- Box office: ₹ 8 crores

Paramathma is a 2011 Indian Kannada-language romantic comedy film written, directed and co-produced by Yogaraj Bhat. It stars Puneeth Rajkumar and Deepa Sannidhi in the lead roles and was released on 6 October 2011, on the eve of Vijayadashami. Halfway through its production, the film's TV rights was procured for a record ₹3.5 crore. Even before the release, the film grossed a record amount of over ₹25 Cr included broadcasting and distribution rights. Since release, the movie has garnered a cult status for its metaphorical narration and out-of-the box storytelling.

== Plot ==
Param, the son of a heart specialist Jayanth Rao, is eager to know many things in life, and keeps on shuffling from one place to another. A gold medallist in B.Sc, Param takes six attempts to obtain his M.Sc degree because of his friends, and is a rich guy and can do any task easily. Param falls in love with Deepa, but Sanvi is also in love with him. However, Param does not have any feelings other than that of a friend for the latter. He makes this clear and shows interest in getting Deepa as his partner in life. Convincing Deepa's family of this proves to be difficult. The proposal enrages Deepa, but soon falls for Param. Tragedy strikes Param, when Deepa dies after a few years, leaving Param with their child. At this juncture, Sanvi arrives to invite Param to her wedding. Param reacts in a very jovial manner, and seems to believe that although Deepa is not physically with him, but mentally she has not left him.

== Cast ==
- Puneeth Rajkumar as Paramathma, Deepa's husband and Sanvi's love interest
- Deepa Sannidhi as Deepa Paramathma, Param's girlfriend turned wife
- Aindrita Ray as Sanvi, Param's friend who is in unrequited love with him
- Anant Nag as Jayanth Rao, a cardiologist, Param's father
- Ramya Barna as Pavitra
- Avinash as Srinivas
- Rangayana Raghu as Raghava, Param's friend
- H. G. Dattatreya as Appanna, Deepa's grandfather who helps for the wedding of Deepa and Paramathma
- Raju Talikote as Rajappa
- Shweta Pandit as "Kerosene"
- Prashanth Siddi as Raghava's servant
- Arasu Maharaj as Appanna's servant
- Rockline Sudhakar as truck driver
- Shashikala
- Bhavani Prakash
- Irina as Janet
- Bhaskar Surya
- Jayanna
- Bhogendra
- Neelakantha
- Anaji Nagaraj
- Vinayak Poojari
- Sathish Ninasam as a cab driver
- Devaraj H C

== Production ==
Originally movie titled Lagori was to be filmed in 2009 starring Puneeth Rajkumar, but it got shelved after producer Rockline Venkatesh withdrew from the film citing increasing production costs. In 2011, after the success of Bhat's 2010 home production movie Pancharangi, he is co-producing Puneeth Rajkumar starrer Paramathma with distributor-turned-producer Jayanna. The script is said to demand three female leads, and they are: Deepa Sannidhi, Ramya Barna and Aindrita Ray. Filming began on 3 March in Sakleshpura, and the film is being released on 6 October 2011. Shooting locations 17 districts of Karnataka include the coastal districts of Dakshina Kannada, mainly places surrounding Udupi and Manipal.

== Soundtrack ==
Paramathma

Soundtrack album by V. Harikrishna
- Released: 14 September 2011
- Genre: Feature film soundtrack
- Length: 24:14
- Label: Ashwini Media Networks
External audio
- Official Audio Jukebox on YouTube

After a delayed launch of about 10 days, the music album of Paramathma was officially released by Duniya Soori and Raghavendra Rajkumar on 14 September 2011 at Hotel Le Méridien, Bengaluru. While V. Harikrishna has scored the music, lyrics are penned by both Yogaraj Bhat and Jayant Kaikini. Ashwini Media Networks corporation owns the audio rights of the album which was purchased at a record ₹7.7 million.

The movie's audio, which had created a buzz because of lyricist Yogaraj Bhat and music director Harikrishna's recent track record of successful combinations like Jackie and Hudugaru, was well received by the critics. Incidentally, popular Indian film music director A.R. Rahman who listened to the songs while at a recording studio in Chennai, praised and congratulated the team on the songs' composition and lyrics. The song "College Gatelly" (Chombeshwara) took the number 1 spot among the top 20 South Indian film songs on Nokia Ovi music store in the month of October 2011.

No.	Title	Lyrics	Singer(s)	Length
1.	"Yaavanig Gothu?"	Yogaraj Bhat	Tippu	3:42
2.	"Paravasha Naadenu"	Jayanth Kaikini	Sonu Nigam	3:56
3.	"Kathlalli Karadige"	Yogaraj Bhat	V. Harikrishna	4:43
4.	"Hesaru Poorthi"	Yogaraj Bhat	Vani Harikrishna	3:29
5.	"Thanmayalaadenu"	Jayanth Kaikini	Shreya Ghoshal	4:18
6.	"College Gatally (Chombeshwara)"	Yogaraj Bhat	V. Harikrishna	4:09
Total length:				24:14

== Reception ==
=== Critical response ===
B S Srivani from Deccan Herald wrote "Motifs like Karadi Majalu are all woven well into the narrative, but the climax is a rude awakening for fans of both Puneet and Yogaraj. This Paramathma lives up to his billing – shattering many myths (good and bad) and hype". A critic from Bangalore Mirror wrote "The second half of the film drags on and on and you want the film to end. But Bhat does not spare you till he tries to scare you. Songs are good, and it is worth buying the album. Santosh Rai Pataje is awesome; the filmmakers have managed to find some excellent locations". A critic from The Times of India scored the film at 4 out of 5 stars and wrote "Ita's definitely Puneetha's powerful show that keeps the story alive. Aindritha Ray puts on a mature performance. Deepa Sannidhi has hopes of being a star in future. Anant Nag, Rangayana Raghu, Avinash and Dattanna do justice to their roles". A critic from News18 India wrote "Then again it drags for sometime in the second half. But thanks to the gripping climax, everything is forgotten in the last half-an-hour. There are glimpses of Manoj Night Shyamalan's 'Sixth Sense' in the sequences leading to the climax". A critic from Sify.com wrote "Santhosh Rai Pathaaje takes the cake as a master director of cinematography. Equally likeable is Hari Krishnaa`s music compositions and background music. Santhosh Rai Pathaaje is top class behind camera. Watch Paramathma for its classic style of narration and good packaging. Shruti Indira Lakshminarayana from Rediff.com scored the film at 2.5 out of 5 stars and says "Puneet's character is a motor mouth like most of Bhat's previous leading men. Deepa Sanidhi laughs her way through the film and into our hearts. Aindrita has a few scenes to her credit. Songs by Harikrishna and camera work by Santosh Rai Pataje are the true heroes. Paramathma disappoints".
