= Preetham Gubbi =

Indian film screenwriter turned director

- Born: 14 January; Karnataka, India
- Occupations: Film director, screenwriter
- Years active: 2006–present
- Spouse: Sushma K. Rao (m. 2010; div. 2013)
- Relatives: Gubbi Veeranna (grandfather)

Preetham Gubbi is an Indian film screenwriter turned director who works in Kannada film industry. He made his debut as a script writer for the blockbuster Kannada film Mungaru Male in 2006. He debuted as a director with the film Haage Summane in 2009.

== Early life ==
Preetham is the grandson of the theater artiste Gubbi Veeranna. He is an associate of Yogaraj Bhat.

== Career ==
=== As screenwriter ===
Preetham made his debut with the film Mungaru Male as the script writer and co-writer of the screenplay.

=== As director ===
In 2012, Preetham had one release:Jaanu starring Yash and Deepa Sannidhi. His next script was based on bromance involving 3 youngsters and their love lives. Preetham cast an entire group of emerging actors including the child-artist turned Radio Jockey, Vinayak Joshi among others. He titled the film Nam Duniya Nam Style. With this film, Preetham turned himself as a producer and produced the venture under the banner name of "Gubbi Talkies".

== Filmography ==
Year	Title	Director	Screenplay	Story	Note.
2006	Mungaru Male	No	Yes	Yes	Co-writer: Yograj Bhat
2007	Geleya	No	Yes	Yes	
2008	Aramane	No	Yes	No	
2008	Haage Summane	Yes	Yes	Yes	
2009	Maleyali Jotheyali	Yes	Yes	Yes	
2011	Johny Mera Naam Preethi Mera Kaam	Yes	Yes	Yes	
2012	Jaanu	Yes	Yes	Yes	
2013	Nam Duniya Nam Style	Yes	Yes	Yes	Producer Also
2014	Dil Rangeela	Yes	Yes	Yes	
2015	Boxer	Yes	Yes	Yes	
2016	Naanu Mattu Varalakshmi	Yes	Yes	Yes	
2018	Johnny Johnny Yes Papa	Yes	Yes	Yes	
2019	99	Yes	Yes	No	Remake of '96
2023	Baanadariyalli	Yes	Yes	No	
