= Ravi Varma (stunt director) =

Indian stunt director (born 1976)

Ravi Varma Kumar
- Born: Bangalore, Karnataka, India
- Occupations: Stunt director; filmmaker
- Years active: 1995–present
- Spouse: C. Rathna
- Children: 2
- Awards: Title: Sahasa Sarvabhoma Karnataka State Film Awards, SIIMA

Kalasaiah Ravi Kumar is an Indian stunt director and filmmaker known for his work in South Indian and Bollywood films.

== Early life ==
Ravi Varma was born on 6 January 1976 to K Kalasaiah and Ningamma in Bangalore, Karnataka. He did his schooling in Bangalore Corporation School. He was once a autorickshaw driver.

== Career ==
Varma began his journey with Sandalwood in 1995 as a fight assistant. A breakthrough in his film career happened when he assumed the role of action director in the Kannada film Dharma in 2004, starring Darshan. His biggest Sandalwood movie so far is Darshan's Sangoli Rayanna, an epic period movie filmed on a grand scale with 1,000 actors. Ravi Varma entered the Telugu industry with Krishna Vamsi's Mahatma in 2009.

Varma's stunts in the South Indian film industry earned him a break with Prabhu Deva's R... Rajkumar (2013) in which Shahid Kapoor played the lead role. He also worked with Salman Khan, Shah Rukh Khan and Ajay Devgn in the films Jai Ho (2014), Raees (2017), and Action Jackson (2014) respectively. His prime projects are Doddmane Hudga, Jaguar, Santhu Straight Forward, Dhruva, Rock On!! 2 and Machine.

In 2019, Varma turned director for the first time with Rustum (2019), headlined by Shiva Rajkumar. He worked as a stunt coordinator on Border 2 (2026). In the same year, he produced his first film, Rakkasapuradhol, a crime drama set in the 1990s, starring Raj B. Shetty. His second directorial, and first in Hindi, Blind Babu, starring Nawazuddin Siddiqui, is scheduled for release in August 2026.

== Filmography ==
Key
†	Denotes films that have not yet been released

Film	Year	Language	Notes
Sri Manjunatha	2001	Kannada	
Dharma	2004	Kannada	
Jothe Jotheyali	2006	Kannada	
Suntaragaali	2006	Kannada	
Mungaru Male	2006	Kannada	
Shri	2006	Kannada	Won Udaya Film Awards
Anatharu	2007	Kannada	
Gaja	2008	Kannada	
Navagraha	2008	Kannada	
Vamshi	2008	Kannada	
Ambari	2009	Kannada	Won Karnataka State Film Awards
Kabaddi	2009	Kannada	Won Suvarna Film Awards
Mahatma	2009	Telugu	
Jackie	2010	Kannada	
Mynaa	2010	Tamil	
Krishnan Love Story	2010	Kannada	
Saarathi	2011	Kannada	Won SIIM Award
Jarasandha	2011	Kannada	
Paramathma	2011	Kannada	
Hudugaru	2011	Kannada	
Kempe Gowda	2011	Kannada	
Bejawada	2011	Telugu	
Anna Bond	2012	Kannada	
Varadhanayaka	2012	Kannada	
Sangoli Rayanna	2012	Kannada	Won Karnataka State Film Awards, Udaya Film Awards
Addhuri	2012	Kannada	Won SIIM Award
Yaare Koogadali	2012	Kannada	
Thappana	2012	Malayalam	
Tadakha	2013	Telugu	
Om 3D	2013	Telugu	
Bachchan	2013	Kannada	
Raja Huli	2013	Kannada	
Bulbul	2013	Kannada	
R... Rajkumar	2013	Hindi	
Googly	2013	Kannada	Won SIIM Award
Bahaddur	2014	Kannada	
Power	2014	Kannada	
Brahma	2014	Kannada	
Gajakesari	2014	Kannada	
Jai Ho	2014	Hindi	
Action Jackson	2014	Hindi	
Mr. and Mrs. Ramachari	2014	Kannada	Won SIIM Award
Alludu Seenu	2014	Telugu	
Paisa	2014	Telugu	
Ugramm	2014	Kannada	
Ambareesha	2014	Kannada	
Rowdy Fellow	2014	Telugu	
Hero	2015	Hindi	
Vajrakaya	2015	Kannada	
Mr. Airavata	2015	Kannada	
Tiger	2015	Telugu	
Arjuna	2015	Kannada	
Rocket	2015	Kannada	
Boxer	2015	Kannada	
Rana Vikrama	2015	Kannada	
Iru Mugan	2016	Tamil	
Sarrainodu	2016	Telugu	
Okka Ammayi Thappa	2016	Telugu	
Thikka	2016	Telugu	
Ram-Leela	2015	Kannada	
Tharai Thappattai	2016	Tamil	
Ricky	2016	Kannada	
Oopiri / Thozha	2016	Telugu, Tamil	
Style King	2016	Kannada	
A Aa	2016	Telugu	
Zoom	2016	Kannada	
Viraat	2016	Kannada	
Akhil	2016	Telugu	
Crazy Boy	2016	Kannada	
Happy Birthday	2016	Kannada	
Speedunnodu	2016	Telugu	
Dictator	2016	Telugu	
Freaky Ali	2016	Hindi	
Babu Bangaram	2016	Telugu	
Doddmane Hudga	2016	Kannada	
Santhu Straight Forward	2016	Kannada	
Kirik Party	2016	Kannada	
Jaguar	2016	Kannada	
Dhruva	2016	Telugu	
Rock On 2	2016	Hindi	
Machine	2017	Hindi	
Raees	2017	Hindi	
Maasthi Gudi	2017	Kannada	
Winner	2017	Telugu	
Hebbuli	2017	Kannada	
Bangara s/o Bangarada Manushya	2017	Kannada	
Raajakumara	2017	Kannada	
Tiger	2017	Kannada	
Munna Michael	2017	Hindi	
Saheba	2017	Kannada	
Villain	2017	Malayalam	
Garuda	2017	Kannada	
Kariya 2	2017	Kannada	
Nene Raju Nene Mantri	2017	Telugu	
November Nalli Naanu Avalu	2017	Kannada	
Mufti	2017	Kannada	
Anjaniputra	2017	Kannada	
Bruhaspati	2018	Kannada	
The Villain	2018	Kannada	
Sketch	2018	Tamil	
Samhaara	2018	Kannada	
Agnyaathavaasi	2018	Telugu	
Naa Peru Surya	2018	Telugu	
Mauli	2018	Marathi	
Satyamev Jayate	2018	Hindi	
Pantham	2018	Telugu	
Amma I Love You	2018	Kannada	
Rustum	2019	Kannada	also director
Pailwaan	2019	Kannada	
Nani's Gang Leader	2019	Telugu	
Commando 3	2019	Hindi	Nominated Filmfare Awards
Bharaate	2019	Kannada	
Ayushman Bhava	2019	Kannada	
Venky Mama	2019	Telugu	
Kiss	2019	Kannada	
Thrissur Pooram	2019	Malayalam	
Buddhivantha 2	2020	Kannada	
Shiva 143	2020	Kannada	
Disco Raja	2020	Telugu	
V (film)	2020	Telugu	also actor
Q	2020	Kannada	
Bhajarangi 2	2021	Kannada	
Rider	2021	Kannada	
Mugilpete	2021	Kannada	
Republic	2021	Telugu	
Vakeel Saab	2021	Telugu	
Shyam Singha Roy	2021	Telugu	
Crack	2021	Hindi	
James	2022	Kannada	
Aaraattu	2022	Malayalam	
Vijayanand	2022	Kannada	
Vedha	2022	Kannada	
Ravaan	2022	Bengali	His first Bengali film
Lucky Man	2022	Kannada	
Ashoka Blade	2022	Kannda	
Macherla Niyojakavargam	2022	Telugu	
Kaaneyaadavara Bagge Prakatane	2022	Kannada	
Andondittu Kaala	2022	Kannada	
Kabzaa	2023	Kannada	
Gumraah	2023	Hindi	
Love Me or Hate Me	2023	Kannada	
Mission Majnu	2023	Hindi	
Martin	2023	Kannada	
Bad Manners	2023	Kannada	
Choo Mantar †	2023	Kannada	also acted in a lead role
Ramabanam	2023	Telugu	
Gadar 2	2023	Hindi	
Bhuvanam Gaganam	2023	Kannada	
UI	2023	Kannada	
KD: The Devil	2023	Kannada	
Ranneeti	2023	Hindi	
IB71	2023	Hindi	
Chandramukhi 2	2023	Tamil	
Manush: Child of Destiny	2023	Bengali	
Love Li	2024	Kannada	
Crakk	2024	Hindi	
Pepe	2024	Kannada	
Mudhol	2024	Kannada	
Royal	2023	Kannada	
Rakkasapuradhol	2026	Kannada	As Producer
Border 2	2026	Hindi	
Ekka	2025	Kannada	
45	2025	Kannada	
Akhanda 2	2025	Telugu	As Action Director

== Awards ==
Varma has received many awards from the Kannada and the Telugu film industries. He has been conferred with the title Saahasa Saarvabouma by the Kannada film industry.

Year	Award	Film	Category	Result
2006	Udaya Film Awards	Shri	Best Stunt Director	Won
2009	Karnataka State Film Awards	Ambari	Best Stunt Director	Won
2009	Suvarna Film Awards	Kabaddi	Best Stunt Director	Won
2012	Udaya Film Awards	Sangoli Rayanna	Best Stunt Director	Won
2012	South Indian International Film Awards (SIIMA)	Addhuri	Best Fight Choreographer	Won
2012	Sandalwood Star Award	Kempe Gowda	Best Fight Choreographer	Won
2013	Karnataka State Film Awards	Sangoli Rayanna	Best Stunt Director	Won
2013	Suvarna Film Awards	Sangoli Rayanna	Best Stunt Director	Won
2013	South Indian International Film Awards (SIIMA)	Saarathi	Best Fight Choreographer	Won
2014	South Indian International Film Awards (SIIMA)	Googly	Best Fight Choreographer	Won
2014	Zee Cine Awards	R... Rajkumar	Best Action	Nominated
2015	South Indian International Film Awards (SIIMA)	Mr. and Mrs. Ramachari	Best Fight Choreographer	Won
