= Rhaatee =

2015 Indian Kannada romantic film

- Theatrical release poster
- Directed by: A. P. Arjun
- Written by: A. P. Arjun
- Produced by: V. Harikrishna
- Starring: Dhananjay; Shruthi Hariharan
- Cinematography: Satya Hegde
- Edited by: Deepu S. Kumar
- Music by: V. Harikrishna
- Production company: Harmonium Reeds
- Distributed by: Thoogudeepa Distributors
- Release date: 20 March 2015
- Running time: 138 minutes
- Country: India
- Language: Kannada

Rhaatee is a 2015 Indian Kannada-language romantic action thriller film directed by A. P. Arjun and produced by V. Harikrishna, who also composed the music, under Harmonium Reeds. It stars Dhananjay and Shruthi Hariharan, alongside Bullet Prakash, Raghav Uday, Suchendra Prasad and Mohan Juneja. The cinematography and editing were handled by Satya Hegde and Deepu. S. Kumar.

The film was launched officially on 3 March 2013, but underwent delays and took a long time to shoot.

Rhaatee was released on 20 March 2015 and received mixed-to-positive reviews from critics.

== Plot ==
Raja and Rani are young lovers from Keregodu, and they arrive in Bangalore for their wedding shopping. Rani, who is a big fan of Darshan, wants to see his film Sangolli Rayanna in Mahadeshwara theatre. In the theatre, she goes to the washroom but doesn't return. Raja searches for her everywhere on the outskirts of Bangalore.

When Rani is found, Raja is shocked to learn that one of Rani's kidneys has been removed by illegal organ traders. Raja kills the kingpin Shankar and escapes with Rani to Muthathi forest where they are helped by their auto driver friend 24/7 Jaganna. Shankar's brother, Seena, sets out to search for them, but to no avail.

After five days, Raja and Rani escape from the forest again when some goons attack Rani. They reach Mahadeshwara theatre where Seena is informed of their location through an auto driver. A combat ensues which results in Raja and Rani being brutally killed by Seena. Jaganna, who was doing wedding shopping reaches the theatre, only to find them dead and gets devastated.

== Cast ==
- Dhananjay as Raja
- Shruthi Hariharan as Rani
- Bullet Prakash as 24/7 Jaganna
- Ravi Mariya as Seena
- Suchendra Prasad as Inspector
- Mohan Juneja as Constable Shivappa
- Raghav Uday as Seena, Shankar's brother

== Soundtrack ==
Rhaatee

Soundtrack album by V. Harikrishna
- Released: November 2014
- Genre: Feature film soundtrack
- Length: 19:38
- Label: D Beats
- Producer: V. Harikrishna

Music composer V. Harikrishna was roped in to score for both the score and soundtrack consisting of six tracks. Actor Sudeepa recorded one song for the film in Chennai. The lyrics for the tracks were written by A. P. Arjun and Yogaraj Bhat.

No.	Title	Lyrics	Singer(s)	Length
1.	"Ratti Patta"	A. P. Arjun	Vani Harikrishna, Santhosh Venky	4:33
2.	"Raja Rani (male)"	A. P. Arjun	Santhosh Venky	3:26
3.	"Jodi Hakki"	A. P. Arjun	Sudeepa	3:23
4.	"Nanna Bennalina"	Yogaraj Bhat	Sonu Nigam	3:39
5.	"Raja Rani (female)"	A. P. Arjun	Shreya Ghoshal	3:26
6.	"Devaru Illada"	A. P. Arjun	Santhosh Venky	1:11
Total length:				19:38
