= Bharjari =

2017 Kannada film directed by Chethan Kumar

- Promotional poster
- Directed by: Chethan Kumar
- Produced by: R. Srinivas; Sreekanth K. P.
- Starring: Dhruva Sarja; Rachita Ram; Hariprriya
- Narrated by: Darshan Thoogudeep
- Cinematography: Shreesha Kuduvalli
- Edited by: Deepu S. Kumar
- Music by: V. Harikrishna
- Production company: R. S. Productions
- Release date: 15 September 2017
- Country: India
- Language: Kannada

Bharjari is a 2017 Indian Kannada-language action drama film directed by Chethan Kumar and produced by R. S. Productions. The film stars Dhruva Sarja, Rachita Ram and Haripriya, alongside Tara, Suchendra Prasad, Srinivasa Murthy, Avinash, Raghav Uday, Anil Kumar and Raj Deepak Shetty. The music was composed by V. Harikrishna, while the cinematography and editing were handled by Shreesha Kuduvalli and Deepu. S. Kumar.

Bharjari was released on 15 September 2017 and became a commercial success at the box office. The film was dubbed in Telugu as Pushparaj The Soldier, Hindi as same title, Tamil as Ivan Pattalathan and Malayalam as Soorya The Soldier.

== Plot ==
Surya, an orphan youth, gets a chance to join the military but decides to help a girl and her family. In the process, he learns about his biological parents and grandparents. How he will reconcile with his family and the hurdles he faces forms the movie's plot.

== Cast ==
- Dhruva Sarja as Surya Rudraprathap
- Rachita Ram as Gowri
- Haripriya as Haasini
- Vaishali Deepak as Lakshmi
- Sudha Rani
- Tara
- Srinivasa Murthy
- Sai Kumar
- Bharath Gowda
- Avinash
- Raghav Uday
- Rangayana Raghu
- Anil Kumar
- Jai Jagadish
- Kuri Prathap
- Sadhu Kokila
- Raju Talikote
- Suchendra Prasad
- Sangeetha
- Chiranjeevi Sarja as a soldier (Cameo appearance)
- Sumithra
- Jahangir M. S.
- Raj Deepak Shetty
- Arasu Maharaj
- Madhugiri Prakash
- Ashok Sharma
- Narayana Swamy
- Veena Ponnappa
- Yamuna murthy
- Malathi Shekhar
- Shruthi Raj
- Suresh Rai
- Petrol Prasanna
- Patre Nagaraj
- Lakshman Rao

== Production ==
Bharjari was announced in April 2015 with Chethan Kumar directing and writing its screenplay and production by R. Srinivas and Sreekanth K. P. under RS Productions. Dhruva Sarja was signed to play the male lead and Sooraj S to play the antagonist. Sarja had previously collaborated with the team in Bahaddur (2014). Rachita Ram was signed to play the female lead and a supporting role by Tara Anuradha was confirmed in the same month. Sudharani also joined the cast to play an important supporting role.

The muhurat shot was taken on 12 June and filming began on 25 June 2015. Prior to this, in line with promoting the film, a first-look teaser was released by the makers on YouTube in the form typography on 11 June. Calling it a 'look test', the director said it was a first in Kannada cinema.

== Soundtrack ==
Bharjari

Soundtrack album by V. Harikrishna
- Recorded: 2017
- Genre: Feature film soundtrack

The soundtrack for the film was composed by V. Harikrishna.

Track list (Bharjari)
No.	Title	Lyrics	Singer(s)	Length
1.	"Puttgowri"	Chethan Kumar	Vijay Prakash, Anuradha Bhat	4:09
2.	"Bharjari Soundu"	Chethan Kumar	Shashank Sheshagiri	3:59
3.	"Ajji Helida"	Chethan Kumar	Anuradha Bhat	4:05
4.	"Ranga Baaro"	A. P. Arjun	V. Harikrishna, Indu Nagaraj	4:05

Track list (Soorya the Soldier)
No.	Title	Lyrics	Singer(s)	Length
1.	"Gouri"	Santhosh Kodanad	Jayadeva, Anamika	4:02
2.	"Ivanoru Porali"	Khader Hassan	Samson Silva	4:01
3.	"Muthashi Kadhayile"	Khader Hassan	R.J. Sumi	4:07
4.	"Airavatham Busil"	Khader Hassan	Samson Silva, Adv Gayathri	3:13

== Release ==
- Bharjari was released on 15 September 2017.
- The satellite and digital rights were sold to Star Suvarna and Disney+ Hotstar.

== Reception ==
Sunayana Suresh of The Times of India gave 3.5/5 stars and wrote "This is a mass entertainer which nearly works with a slight lag in the second half, but it does have enough to ensure at least one visit to the cinema halls." Shyam Prasad S of Bangalore Mirror gave 2.5/5 stars and wrote "Despite the slick narrative, amazing screen presence of Dhruva Sarja and grandly mounted sets, Bharjari is but a motley hotchpotch of situations from standard commercial films." Shashiprasad SM of Deccan Chronicle wrote "The director has carefully penned every word to give it a 'blockbuster' feel." A Sharadhaa of The New Indian Express wrote "Chethan Kumar and Dhruva Sarja seem to have cracked the commercial-movie formulae. The whistles and the crowds at the theatre give a thumbs-up to their effort."
