= 4th South Indian International Movie Awards =

Indian annual film awards event

- Date: 6–7 August 2015
- Site: Dubai World Trade Center, Dubai, United Arab Emirates

Television coverage
- Network: Sun TV Network
- Ratings: 14.01

The 4th South Indian International Movie Awards was held in Dubai World Trade Center, Dubai on 6 and 7 August 2015. SIIMA 2015 recognized the best films and performances from the past year, along with special honors for lifetime contributions and a few special awards.

== Honorary awards ==
=== Lifetime Achievement Award ===
- Bharathiraja
- KPAC Lalitha

=== Special appreciation ===
- Dhanush – Pride of South Indian cinema

== Main awards ==
List of Nominations & Award Winners

=== Film ===
Best Film
Tamil	Telugu
Kaththi – Lyca Productions / A. Subhashkaran, K. Karunamurthy; Goli Soda – Roughnote Productions / Bharath Seeni; Jigarthanda – Kathiresan; Madras – Studio Green / K. E. Gnanavel Raja, S. R. Prakashbabu, S. R. Prabhu; Velaiyilla Pattathari – Dhanush	Manam – Annapurna Studios/ Nagarjuna; Legend – 14 Reels Entertainment; Govindudu Andarivadele – Parameshwara Art Productions / Bandla Ganesh; Chandamama Kathalu – Chanakya Booneti; Race Gurram – Sri Lakshmi Narasimha Productions / Nallamalapu Srinivas
Kannada	Malayalam
Mr. and Mrs. Ramachari – Jayanna Combines; Gajakesari – Jayanna Combines; Ugramm – Inkfinite Pictures; Oggarane – Prakash Raj Productions; Drishya – E4 Entertainment	Bangalore Days – Anwar Rasheed Entertainments and Weekend Blockbusters; Iyobinte Pustakam – Amal Neerad & Fahadh Faasil; Om Shanti Oshana – Ananya Films / Alwin Antony; How Old Are You – Magic Frames / Listin Stephen; Munnariyippu – Gold Coin Motion Pictures / Ranjith
Best Director
Tamil	Telugu
Pa. Ranjith – Madras; A. R. Murugadoss – Kaththi; Vijay – Saivam; Vijay Milton – Goli Soda; Karthik Subbaraj – Jigarthanda	Surender Reddy – Race Gurram; Srivass – Loukyam; Boyapati Srinu – Legend; Vikram Kumar – Manam; Srikanth Addala – Mukunda
Kannada	Malayalam
Santhosh Anandram – Mr. and Mrs. Ramachari; Prakash Raj – Oggarane; P. Raghuram – Fair & Lovely; Prashanth Neel– Ugramm; P. Vasu – Drishya	Anjali Menon – Bangalore Days; Amal Neerad – Iyobinte Pustakam; Ranjith – Njaan; Venu – Munnariyippu; Rosshan Andrrews – How Old Are You
Best Cinematographer
Tamil	Telugu
Murali G – Madras; Vetrivel Mahendran – Kayal; GavemicV Ary – Jigarthanda; Vijay Milton – Goli Soda; Nirav Shah– Saivam	R. Rathnavelu – 1: Nenokkadine; Karthik Ghattamaneni – Karthikeya; P. S. Vinod – Manam; Manoj Paramahamsa– Race Gurram; Madhie – Run Raja Run
Kannada	Malayalam
Vaidi S – Mr. and Mrs. Ramachari; Shekar Chandra – Brahma; Sreesha Kuduvalli – Bahaddur; Satya Hegde – Gajakesari; Karam Chawla – Ulidavaru Kandanthe	Abhinandan Ramanujam – Mosayile Kuthira Meenukal; Venu – Munnariyippu; Manoj Pillai – Njaan; Sameer Thahir– Bangalore Days; Amal Neerad – Iyobinte Pustakam

=== Acting ===
Best Actor
Tamil	Telugu
Dhanush – Velaiilla Pattadhari; Vijay – Kaththi; Karthi – Madras; Siddharth – Jigarthanda; Vijay Sethupathi – Pannaiyarum Padminiyum	Nandamuri Balakrishna – Legend; Mahesh Babu – 1: Nenokkadine; Venkatesh – Drushyam; Naga Chaitanya – Manam; Allu Arjun – Race Gurram
Kannada	Malayalam
Yash – Mr. and Mrs. Ramachari; Dhruva Sarja – Bahaddur; Upendra – Brahma; Sathish Ninasam – Love in Mandya; Sri Murali – Ugramm	Nivin Pauly – 1983; Mammootty – Varsham; Fahadh Faasil – Iyobinte Pustakam; Prithviraj – 7th Day; Nivin Pauly – Bangalore Days
Best Actress
Tamil	Telugu
Hansika Motwani – Aranmanai; Amala Paul – Velaiyilla Pattathari; Samantha Ruth Prabhu – Kaththi; Lakshmi Menon – Jigarthanda; Vedhicka – Kaaviyathalaivan	Shruti Haasan – Race Gurram; Nayanthara – Anamika; Rakul Preet Singh – Loukyam; Kajal Aggarwal – Govindudu Andarivadele; Samantha Ruth Prabhu – Manam
Kannada	Malayalam
Radhika Pandit – Mr. and Mrs. Ramachari; Kriti Kharbanda – Super Ranga; Amulya – Gajakesari; Parul Yadav – Shivajinagara; Pranitha Subhash – Brahma	Manju Warrier – How Old Are You; Nazriya Nazim – Om Shanti Oshana; Aparna Gopinath – Munnariyippu; Namitha Pramod – Vikramadithyan; Anusree – Ithihasa
Best Actor in a Supporting Role
Tamil	Telugu
Bobby Simha – Jigarthanda; Rajkiran – Manjapai; Nassar – Saivam; Vidyut Jamwal – Anjaan; Kalaiyarasan – Madras	Srinivas Avasarala – Oohalu Gusagusalade; Srikanth – Govindudu Andarivadele; Ajay – Dikkulu Choodaku Ramayya; Prakash Raj – Govindudu Andarivadele; Sreenivas Reddy – Geethanjali
Kannada	Malayalam
Achyuth Kumar – Mr. and Mrs. Ramachari; Thilak Shekar – Ugramm; Kishore Jayaram – Ulidavaru Kandanthe; Pannagha Bharan – Vasundhara; Venkatesh Prasad – Sachin! Tendulkar Alla	Jayasurya – Apothecary; Indrans – Apothecary; Anoop Menon – Vikramadithyan; Renji Panicker – Om Shanti Oshana; Nandu – Ottamandaram
Best Actress in a Supporting Role
Tamil	Telugu
Saranya Ponvannan – Velaiyilla Pattathari; Seetha – Goli Soda; Riythvika – Madras; Saritha – Inam; Suhasini Maniratnam – Ramanujan	Shriya Saran – Manam; Nadhiya Moidu – Drushyam; Jayasudha – Yevadu; Sujatha Kumar – Legend; Lakshmi Manchu – Chandamama Kathalu
Kannada	Malayalam
Suhasini Maniratnam – Sachin! Tendulkar Alla; Kavya Shah – Mr. and Mrs. Ramachari; Harshika Poonacha – Maryade; Iswarya Menon – Namo Bhootatma; Swaroopini Narayan – Drishya	Parvathy – Bangalore Days; Anumol – Njaan; Lena – Vikramadithyan; Padmapriya – Iyobinte Pustakam; Srinda Ashab – 1983
Best Actor in a Negative Role
Tamil	Telugu
Neil Nitin Mukesh – Kaththi; Prashant Narayanan – Nedunchaalai; Madhusudhan Rao – Goli Soda; Nandakumar – Madras; Bobby Simha – Jigarthanda	Jagapati Babu – Legend; Sai Kumar – Yevadu; Ravi Kishan – Race Gurram; Rao Ramesh – Mukunda; Madhusudhan Rao – Autonagar Surya
Kannada	Malayalam
P. Ravi Shankar– Maanikya; Avinash – Ragini IPS; Ashish Vidyarthi– Shivajinagara; Kelly Dorjee – Power ***; Sharath Lohitashwa – Ambareesha	Jayasurya – Iyobinte Pustakam; Sudheesh Shankar – Njan Steve Lopez; Raghavan – Apothecary; Lal – Iyobinte Pustakam; Sekhar Menon – Gangster
Best Comedian
Tamil	Telugu
Vivek – Velaiyilla Pattathari; Kovai Sarala– Aranmanai; Karunakaran – Yaamirukka Bayamey; Thambi Ramaiah– Kathai Thiraikathai Vasanam Iyakkam; Soori – Jilla	Brahmanandam – Race Gurram; Ali – Oka Laila Kosam; Prudhvi Raj – Loukyam; Sapthagiri – Kotha Janta; Vennela Kishore – Pandavulu Pandavulu Thummeda
Kannada	Malayalam
Chikkanna – Adyaksha; Rangayana Raghu – Power ***; Sadhu Kokila – Mr. and Mrs. Ramachari; Jehangir – Bahaddur; Bullet Prakash– Rose	Aju Varghese– Vellimoonga; Chemban Vinod Jose – Tamaar Padaar; Balu– Ithihasa; Sudheer Karamana – Sapthamashree Thaskaraha; Kalabhavan Shajon– Ring Master

=== Critics awards ===
Best Actor (Critics)
Tamil	Telugu
Karthi – Madras	Naga Chaitanya – Manam
Kannada	Malayalam
Upendra – Super Ranga	Prithviraj – 7th Day
Best Actress (Critics)
Tamil	Telugu
Amala Paul – Velaiyilla Pattathari	Samantha Ruth Prabhu – Manam
Kannada	Malayalam
Kriti Kharbanda – Super Ranga	Anusree – Ithihasa

=== Debut awards ===
Best Debut Actor
Tamil	Telugu
Chandran – Kayal; Dulquer Salmaan – Vaayai Moodi Pesavum; Aari – Nedunchaalai; Abhinay Vaddi – Ramanujan; Santhosh Pratap – Kathai Thiraikathai Vasanam Iyakkam	Sai Dharam Tej – Pilla Nuvvu Leni Jeevitam; Bellamkonda Sai Srinivas – Alludu Sreenu; Sampoornesh Babu – Hrudaya Kaleyam; Varun Tej – Mukunda; Tejus Kancherla – Ulavacharu Biriyani
Kannada	Malayalam
Bharath Sarja – Veera Pulikeshi; Pawan Wadeyar – Preeti Geeti Ityadi; Pradeep– Rangan Style; Vivek – Endendu Ninagagi; Kiran Rao – Savaari 2	Farhaan Faasil – Njan Steve Lopez; Santhosh Keezhattoor – Vikramadithyan; John Brittas – Vellivelichathil; Sudev Nair – My Life Partner; Vipin Aatley – Homely Meals
Best Debut Actress
Tamil	Telugu
Catherine Tresa – Madras; Prayaga – Pisaasu; Sonakshi Sinha – Lingaa; Ishaara Nair – Sathuranga Vettai; Malavika Nair – Cuckoo	Raashi Khanna – Oohalu Gusagusalade; Kriti Sanon – 1: Nenokkadine; Mishti Chakraborty – Chinnadana Nee Kosam; Adah Sharma – Heart Attack; Pooja Hegde – Oka Laila Kosam
Kannada	Malayalam
Shilpi Sharma – Aakramana; Erica Fernandes – Ninnindale; Gayathri Iyer – Namo Bhootatma; Aishani Shetty – Jothi Alias Kothiraj; Shona Chhabra – Savaal	Nikki Galrani – 1983; Ahaana Krishna – Njan Steve Lopez; Caroline Bech – Manglish; Sandra Simon – Lal Bahadur Shastri; Pearly Maaney – The Last Supper
Best Debut Producer
Tamil	Telugu
Manobala – Sathuranga Vettai; Bharath Seeni – Goli Soda; Varun Maniyan – Vaayai Moodi Pesavum; K. Chandramohan – Kathai Thiraikathai Vasanam Iyakkam; Manoj Paramahamsa & Sujatha Chenthilnathan– Poovarasam Pee Pee	Venkat Srinivas – Karthikeya; Sunitha Tati – Bangaru Kodipetta; Sampath Nandi – Galipatam; M. V. V. Satyanarayana – Geethanjali; Giridhar Mamidipally – Lakshmi Raave Maa Intiki
Kannada	Malayalam
Inkfinite Pictures – Ugramm; Dynamic Visions – Neenade Naa; Sri Sai Balaji Combines – Billion Dollar Baby; Hombale Films – Ninnindale; Dreamweaver Entertainment – Aaryan	Anwar Rasheed, Sophia Paul – Bangalore Days; Rajesh Augustine – Ithihasa; Dr George Mathew, Dr Baby Mathew – Apothecary; Shibu G Suseelan – 7th Day; Fahadh Faasil – Iyobinte Pustakam
Best Debut Director
Tamil	Telugu
Velraj – Velaiyilla Pattathari; H. Vinoth – Sathuranga Vettai; Raju Murugan– Cuckoo; Caarthik Raju – Thirudan Police; Ram – Mundasupatti	Sujeeth – Run Raja Run; Sripriya – Drushyam; Chandoo Mondeti – Karthikeya; K. S. Ravindra – Power; Srinivas Avasarala – Oohalu Gusagusalade
Kannada	Malayalam
Prashanth Neel – Ugramm; Krishna – Gajakesari; Rakshit Shetty – Ulidavaru Kandanthe; Chetan Kumar – Bahaddur; Santhosh Anandram – Mr. and Mrs. Ramachari	Abrid Shine – 1983; Jude Anthony Joseph – Om Shanti Oshana; Binu S – Ithihasa; Jibu Jacob – Vellimoonga; Shyam Dhar – 7th Day

=== Music ===
Best Music Director
Tamil	Telugu
Anirudh Ravichander – Velaiyilla Pattathari; D. Imman – Rummy; A. R. Rahman – Kaaviya Thalaivan; Ghibran – Thirumanam Enum Nikkah; Santhosh Narayanan – Madras	Anoop Rubens – Manam; S. Thaman – Race Gurram; Ghibran – Run Raja Run; Devi Sri Prasad – 1: Nenokkadine; Mickey J. Meyer – Mukunda
Kannada	Malayalam
V. Harikrishna – Mr. and Mrs. Ramachari; Anoop Seelin – Love in Mandya; Arjun Janya– Maanikya; B. Ajaneesh Loknath – Ulidavaru Kandanthe; Mani Sharma – Ninnindale	Gopi Sunder – Bangalore Days; Bijibal – Vikramadithyan; Shaan Rahman – Om Shanti Oshana; Deepak Dev – Avathaaram; K. Raghavan – Balyakalasakhi
Best Lyricist
Tamil	Telugu
Dhanush – "Amma Amma" from Velaiyilla Pattathari; Vairamuthu – "Kandangi Kandangi" from Jilla; Na. Muthukumar – "Azhagu" from Saivam; Kabilan – "Vinmeen Vithaiyil" from Thegidi; Yugabharathi – "Manasula Soora Kaathey" from Cuckoo	Chandrabose – "Kani Penchina" from Manam; Sirivennela – "Nandalala" from Mukunda; Ramajogayya Sastry – "Nee Kanti Choopullo" from Legend; Ananta Sriram – "Em Sandeham Ledu" from Oohalu Gusagusalade; Vanamali – "Sari Povu Koti" from Karthikeya
Kannada	Malayalam
Ghouse Peer – "Kaarmoda" from Mr. and Mrs. Ramachari; Kaviraj – "Guruvara Sanje" from Power ***; Santhosh Anandram – "Yaralli Sound" from Mr. and Mrs. Ramachari; Rakshit Shetty– "Gaatiya Ilidu" from Ulidavaru Kandanthe; K. Kalyan – "Kannada Siri" from Gajakesari	Hari Narayanan– "Olanjaali Kuruvi" from 1983; Jayageetha – "Koottu Thedi" from Varsham; Rafeeq Ahammed – "Ethu Kari Ravilum" from Bangalore Days; Anwar Ali – "Theruvukal Nee" from Njan Steve Lopez; Santhosh Varma – "Mazha Nila" from Vikramadithyan
Best Male Playback Singer
Tamil	Telugu
Pradeep Kumar – "Aagayam Thee Pidicha" from Madras; Karthik – "Ovvondrai Thirudigirai" from Jeeva; Shadab Faridi – "Enthaara Enthaara" from Thirumanam Enum Nikkah; Abhay Jodhpurkar – "Vinmeen Vithayil" from Thegidi; Dhanush – "Amma Amma" from Velaiyilla Pattathari	Simha – "Cinema Chupista Maava" from Race Gurram; Arijit Singh – "Kanulanu Thake" from Manam; Master Bharath – "Kanipenchina Maa Ammake" from Manam; Devi Sri Prasad – "Who Are You" from 1: Nenokkadine; Gold Devaraj – "Bujjimaa" from Run Raja Run
Kannada	Malayalam
Rajesh Krishnan – "Kaarmoda" from Mr. and Mrs. Ramachari; Vijay Prakash– "Open Hairu" from Adyaksha; Gurukiran – "Pesalagi Order" from Brahma; Santhosh Venky – "Aaramagiri Subbalakshmi" from Bahaddur; Anoop Seelin – "Opkondbitlu Kanla" from Love in Mandya	Vineeth Sreenivasan – "Kattu Mooliyo" from Om Shanti Oshana; Job Kurien – "Thane Pookkum" from Sapthamashree Thaskaraha; P. Jayachandran – "Olanjali Kuruvi" from 1983; Haricharan – "Ethu Kari Ravilum" from Bangalore Days; Siddharth Menon – "Theruvukal Nee" from Njan Steve Lopez
Best Female Playback Singer
Tamil	Telugu
Uthara Unnikrishnan – "Azhaghu" from Saivam; Shreya Ghoshal – "Yen Aala Pakkaporen" from Khayal; Shweta Mohan – "Yaarumilla" from Kaaviya Thalaivan; Shakthisree Gopalan – "Naan Nee" from Madras; Vani Jayaram – "Narayana Narayana" from Ramanujan	Neha Bhasin – "Aww Thujo Mogh Korta" from 1: Nenokkadine; Shreya Ghoshal – "Chinni Chinni Aasalu" from Manam; Shreya Ghoshal – "Nee Jathaga Nenundali" from Yevadu; K. S. Chithra– "Gopikamma" from Mukunda; Chinmayi – "Vaddantune" from Run Raja Run
Kannada	Malayalam
Sinchan Dixit– "Current Hoda Timealli" from Love in Mandya; Apoorva Sridhar – "Aaramagiri Subbulakshmi" from Bahaddur; Anuradha Bhat – "Neenu Iruvaga" from Ninnindale; Hamsika Iyer – "Ninna Danigagi" from Savaari 2; Shreya Ghoshal – "Kannale" from Ambareesha	Sithara – "Saada Paalaya" from Mr. Fraud; Shreya Ghoshal – "Vijanathayil" from How Old Are You; Sowmya T R – "Mazhanila" from Vikramadithyan; Shweta Mohan – "Onnam Kombathe" from Ottamandaram; Preeti Pillai – "Solomonum Soshannayum" from Amen

=== Choreography ===
Best Fight Choreographer
Tamil	Telugu
Anal Arasu– Kaththi; Stunt Silva – Veeram; Stunt Silva – Anjaan; Supreme Sundar – Goli Soda; Anbariv– Madras	Peter Hein – 1: Nenokkadine; Kanal Kannan & Raam-Laxman – Legend; Raam-Laxman – Race Gurram; Raam-Laxman– Power; Selvam – Yevadu
Kannada	Malayalam
Ravi Varma – Mr. and Mrs. Ramachari; K. D. Venkatesh – Shivajinagara; Thriller Manju – Brahma; Vijay – Maanikya; Palaniraj – Gharshane	Dileep Subbarayan– Vikramadithyan; D. Danny – Iyobinte Pustakam; Stun Siva – Rajadhiraja; Anbariv – Hi I'm Tony; Stunt Silva – Mr. Fraud
Best Dance Choreographer
Tamil	Telugu
Shobhi – "Pakkam Vanthu" from Kaththi; Shareef– "Kalyanamam Kalyanam" from Cuckoo; Brinda– "Darling" from Maan Karate; Baba Bhaskar – "What A Karuvadu" from Velaiyilla Pattathari; Raju Sundaram – "Ek Do Teen" from Anjaan	Jani – "Cinema Choopista Maava" from Race Gurram; Jani – "Freedom" from Yevadu; Prem Rakshit – "You are my Love" from 1: Nenokkadine; Chinni Prakash – "Bavagari Choope" from Govindudu Andarivadele; Raju Sundaram – "Rakshasi Rakshasi" from Rabhasa
Kannada	Malayalam
Murali – "Mr. and Mrs. Ramachari" from Mr. and Mrs. Ramachari; A. Harsha – "Suii Tapak" from Gajakesari; Ganesh Hegde– "Dhum Powere" from Power ***; Imran Sardhariya – "Jeena Jeena Yahan" from Maanikya; Harikrishna B. R. – "Rangeela" from Shivajinagara	Shobhi Paul Raj– "Kolussu Thenni Thenni" from Cousins; Brinda– "Maangalyam" from Bangalore Days; Selvi – "Kaana Kombile" from Aamayum Muyalum; Brinda – "Njan Kaanum Neram" from Avathaaram; Gayathri Raguram – "Theeyattam" from Iyobinte Pustakam

== Generation Next Awards ==
- Stylish Youth Icon of South Indian Cinema (male) – Allu Arjun
- Stylish Youth Icon of South Indian Cinema (female) – Amy Jackson
- Most Romantic Star of South Indian Cinema – Bharath Srinivasan
- Most Popular Actress Middle East – Asin Thottumkal
- Most Streamed Song Award :
  - Tamil – Anirudh Ravichander – "Selfie Pulla"
  - Telugu – S. Thaman – Aagadu – Title song
  - Kannada – S. Thaman – Power *** – "Guruvara Sanje"
  - Malayalam – Shaan Rahman – Om Shanti Oshana – "Kattu Mooliyo"
