= Raj Deepak Shetty =

Indian film actor

Raj Dipak Shetty
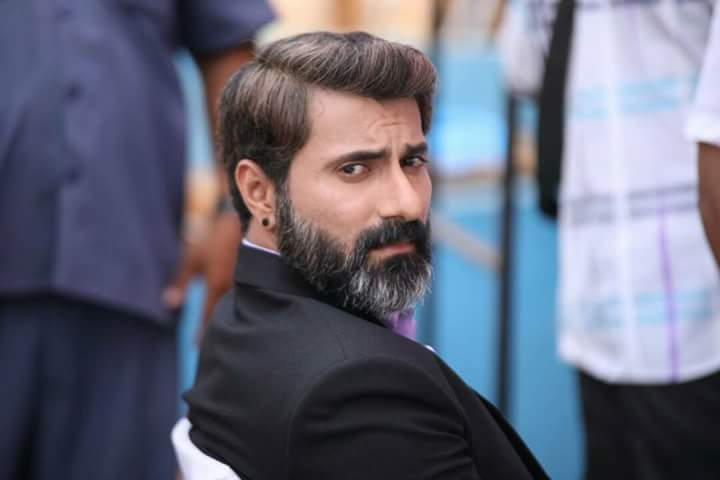
- Raj Dipak Shetty
- Born: 18 October 1978 (age 47); Mangalore, Karnataka, India
- Occupation: Actor
- Years active: 2014 – present
- Spouse: Sonia Rodrigues (m. 2020)

Raj Dipak Shetty (born 18 October 1978) is an Indian actor, predominantly working in Kannada and Telugu films.

== Career ==
Director Chethan Kumar cast Shetty as an antagonist opposite actor Dhruva Sarja in the film Bharjari, which was released in the year 2017. After which Shetty played the antagonist in the movies Tiger and Srikanta, directed by Nanda Kishore and Manju Swaraj respectively. Srikanta was his first film release followed by Tiger and Bharjari.

His role as Devendra Viswanath, in the movie iSmart Shankar, directed by Puri Jagannath, introduced him to the Telugu film industry. Playing the lead as Pratap Reddy in his debut web series, Gods of Dharmapuri, directed by Anish Kuruvilla is fetching him many roles in Telugu Film Industry.

In the 2023, Shetty acted as the antagonist in the Kannada movie Toby.

== Personal life ==
On 18 October 2020, Shetty married Sonia Rodrigues.

== Filmography ==
=== Films ===
Key
†	Denotes films that have not yet been released

Year	Film	Role	Language
2017	Srikanta	Politician Satyamurthi	Kannada
2017	Tiger	MLA	Kannada
2017	Bharjari		Kannada
2017	Gowdru Hotel	CEO	Kannada
2017	Asathoma Sadgamya	Businessman	Kannada
2018	Prayanikara Gamanakke	Inspector	Kannada
2018	Life Jothe Ondh Selfie		Kannada
2019	iSmart Shankar	Devendra	Telugu
2019	Rugged		Kannada
2019	Panchatantra	Appaiah Bond	Kannada
2019	Bharaate		Kannada
2019	Bazaar	Shikra	Kannada
2019	Operation Nakshatra	Srikanta	Kannada
2019	Gadinaadu		Kannada
2019	Aadi Lakshmi Puraana	Smuggler	Kannada
2021	Naarappa	Doraswamy	Telugu
2021	Pogaru	Local Don	Kannada
2022	Virata Parvam	Landlord	Telugu
2022	Battery	Victor	Tamil
2022	Dr. 56	Ashwath	Kannada; Tamil
2023	Toby	Ananda	Kannada
2023	Fighter	Venkoba	Kannada
2024	Hanu Man	Singarayakonda Gaja	Telugu
2025	Jai	MLA Vishwanath	Kannada; Tulu
2026	Shikhandi	Rajendra	Kannada
TBA	Trishoolam †	Abdullah	Kannada
TBA	Eureka †	Varadaraju	Telugu

=== Television ===
Year	Title	Network	Language
2005	Kadambari	Udaya TV	Kannada
2005–2006	Preethi Illada Mele	ETV Kannada	Kannada
2006	Nigooda	Star Suvarna	Kannada
2006–2007	Bandhe Baruthava Kaala	ETV Kannada	Kannada
2006	Muttina Thene	Udaya TV	Kannada
2014–2015	Luv Luvike	Zee Kannada	Kannada
2015–2016	Niharika	Star Suvarna	Kannada

=== Web series ===
Year	Title	Role	Language
2019	Gods of Dharmapuri	Prathap Reddy	Telugu
