= Adyaksha in America =

Adyaksha In America
- Theatrical release poster
- Directed by: Yoganandh Muddanna
- Written by: Shafi
- Based on: Two Countries
- Produced by: T. G. Vishwa Prasad
- Starring: Sharan; Ragini Dwivedi
- Cinematography: Sudhakar S. Raj; Siddharth Ramaswamy; Anish Tharun Kumar
- Edited by: K. M. Prakash
- Music by: V. Harikrishna
- Production company: People Media Factory
- Release date: 4 October 2019
- Running time: 157 minutes
- Country: India
- Language: Kannada

Adyaksha In America is a 2019 Indian Kannada-language romantic comedy directed by Yoganand Muddanna, in his directorial debut. Produced by People Media Factory, It features Sharan and Ragini Dwivedi in the lead roles. The supporting cast includes Sadhu Kokila and Rangayana Raghu. The score and soundtrack for the film is done by V. Harikrishna and cinematography is done by Sudhakar Siddharth and Anish. The editing is done by K. M. Prakash. The film marks the 25th film of actress, Ragini Dwivedi.

The film is a spiritual sequel to the 2014 film Adyaksha and a remake of 2015 Malayalam film Two Countries starring Dileep and Mamta Mohandas in the lead.

== Synopsis ==
A. Ullas is a scamster living in a small town who will do anything for good money. A confusion leads him to marry a rich NRI girl, who has an alcohol problem. Then Ullas tries to sweep away the money of the girl and things becomes complicated

== Cast ==
- Sharan as A. Ullas
- Ragini Dwivedi as Nandini
- Sadhu Kokila as Jimmy Carter
- Shivaraj K. R. Pete as Venky
- Rangayana Raghu
- Makarand Deshpande as Chaman Lal Sheth
- Tabla Nani
- Ashok as Ullas' father
- Padmaja Rao as Ullas' mother
- Disha Pandey as Simran
- Thaarak Ponnappa as O. Ullas
- Chitra Shenoy as
- Avinash
- Prakash Belawadi as Prakash
- Rockline Sudakar aide of O. Ullas
- Sunaina Balekundri as Prakash's wife

== Production ==
The principal photography of the film was held in April 2018 in America. First actor Sharan was on board for the project. Later actress Ragini Dwivedi was on board. Then V. Harikrishna was on board to score music for the film. The makers announced that it will be a sequel project to the 2014 comedy hit Adyaksha. The film's major portions have been shot in America. Only few portions of the film has been shot in Bengaluru and Mysuru.

== Release ==
The film was released on 4 October 2019 in Karnataka.

== Music ==
Adyaksha In America

Soundtrack album by V. Harikrishna
- Released: 6/08/2019
- Genre: Feature film soundtrack
- Language: Kannada
- Label: D Beats
- Producer: V. Harikrishna

V. Harikrishna chronology
Kurukshetra (2019 film) (2019)	Adyaksha In America (2019)	Pogaru (2019)

The film's background score and the soundtracks are composed V. Harikrishna. The music rights were acquired by D Beats music company.

Tracklist
No.	Title	Lyrics	Singer(s)	Length
1.	"Matthe Banda Adhyaksa"	Chethan Kumar (director)	Vijay Prakash	3:39
2.	"Amma Naa Sale Ade"	V. Nagendra Prasad	Tippu	4:07
3.	"Salim Anarkali"	Yogaraj Bhat	Sanjith Hegde	4:17
4.	"Daariye Mugidide"	Kaviraj	Santhosh Venky	3:31
Total length:				15:01

== Reception ==
Times of India wrote "Adhyaksha in America is a script that is tailor-made for Sharan fans. This remake of the Malayalam film Two Countries sticks to the original narrative, while it also has the elements that a Kannada comedy lover would want. The film has more than its share of laughs, and it is picturised well with a good cast too".
