= Chethan Kumar (director) =

Indian film director and screenwriter

- Born: 22 February 1988 (age 38); Kollegal, Karnataka, India
- Occupations: Lyrics writer, screenwriter, dialogue writer, director
- Years active: 2009–present

Chethan Kumar (born 22 February 1988) is an Indian filmmaker, lyrics writer, screenwriter, dialogue writer and director who primarily works in Kannada cinema. His debut directional venture was the 2014 film Bahaddur.

== Career ==
Kumar stepped into film industry unexpectedly. He was writing dialogues for theatre plays in Kalamandir, Mysore through one of his friend he learned of Tushar Ranganath. He joined Tushar Ranganth and worked with him as a dialogue writer for Devru, Kari Chirathe, Gange Bare Tunge Bare, Kanteerava.

Music director Arjun Janya noticed his talent and gave him a chance to write a song lyric for Varadhanayaka. As Arjun Janya said, he wrote "Baite Baite" song which became popular song of that year and made him a songwriter. Then he wrote "Auto Raja Auto Raja" for Auto Raja, "I wanna sing a songu" for Sweety Nanna Jodi, "Bossu Nam Bossu" for Bhajarangi including songs for Rajani Kantha, Shatru, Pulakeshi, Jackson, Ranna and also "Starade", "Subbalakshmi" for his debut directional 2014 film Bahaddur and he is known for introductory songs he wrote for all stars including Darshan (Jaggudada), Yash (Santhu Straight Forward), Puneeth Rajkumar (Anjaniputra), Sudeep (Hebbuli), Ganesh (Pataki), Duniyaviji (Jackson), Sharan (Jai Maruthi800), Shivarajkumar (Killing Veerappan and Bhajarangi) Dhananjaya (Badmash), Madarangi Krishna (Charlie), Nikhil Kumarswamy (Jaguar) and for more than fifty films. He also worked with directors Mahesh Babu, Preetham Gubbi, A.P. Arjun before becoming an independent director. In 2012 he did a documentary Starring Chandan Shetty called as "Yen Madli?".

He made his directional debut in 2014 with Block buster Bahaddur. His next film is Bharjari starring Dhruva Sarja, Rachita Ram, Hariprriya and Vaishali Deepak became Mega Blockbuster hit of 2017. His next film is Bharaate starring Sriimurali, Sreeleela became Mega Blockbuster hit of 2019.

He is now working with Puneeth Rajkumar for his fourth venture. Meanwhile, he wrote dialogues for Anjaniputra, College Kumara, Yajamana and Orange.

== Personal life ==
Chethan Kumar was born in Kollegal, Karnataka and brought up in Mysore.

== Filmography ==
Key
†	Denotes films that have not yet been released

All films are in Kannada, the language is otherwise noted.

Year	Film	Credited as				Notes
Year	Film	Director	Story	Screenplay	Dialogues	Notes
2014	Bahaddur	Yes	Yes	Yes	Yes	Chithrasante - Best Director Award, Best Dialogues, Best Movie; Nominated - SIIMA Award for Best Director, Best Movie
2017	Bharjari	Yes	Yes	Yes	Yes	10th BIFF - Second Most Popular Kannada Entertainment Cinema
2017	College Kumar	No	No	No	Yes	
2018	Orange	No	No	No	Yes	
2019	Yajamana	No	No	No	Yes	
2019	Bharaate	Yes	Yes	Yes	Yes	
2020	Kshatriya	No	No	No	Yes	
2021	SRK	No	No	Yes	Yes	
2022	James	Yes	Yes	Yes	Yes	

=== As lyricist ===
As Lyricist
Year	Film	Notes
2013	Varadhanayaka	
2013	Auto Raja	
2013	Rajani Kantha	
2013	Shatru	
2013	Sweety Nanna Jodi	
2013	Bhajarangi	
2014	Pulakeshi	
2014	Paravashanadenu	
2014	Bahaddur	Chithrasante - Lyrics, Nominated - SIIMA Award Best Lyrics
2014	Subramani	
2015	Jackson	
2015	Katte	
2015	Charlie	
2016	Killing Veerappan	
2016	Jwalantham	
2016	Akira	
2016	Jaggu Dada	
2016	Sipaayi	
2016	Santhu Straight Forward	
2016	Jai Maruthi 800	
2016	Badmaash	
2016	Jaguar	
2016	John Jani Janardhan	
2017	Srikanta	
2017	Chowka	
2017	Hebbuli	
2017	Srinivasa Kalyana	
2017	Veera Ranachandi	
2017	Pataki	
2017	Bharjari	
2017	College Kumar	
2017	Mass Leader	
2017	Athiratha	
2017	Anjani Putra	
2018	Seizer	
2018	Tribaahu	
2018	Samhaara	
2018	Preethiya Rayabhari	
2018	MLA	
2018	Prayanikara Gamanakke	
2018	Ayogya	
2018	Ambi Ning Vayassaytho	
2018	Gaanchali	
2018	Tharakaasura	
2018	Orange	
2019	Yajamana	
2019	Padde Huli	
2019	Hangover	
2019	Sinnga	
2019	Randhawa	
2019	Nanna Prakara	
2019	Udumba	
2019	Geetha	
2019	Adyaksha in America	
2019	Ellidde Illi Tanaka	
2019	Brahmachari	
2019	Bharaate	
2020	Khaki	
2020	Navelru... Half Boiled	
2020	Kaanadante Maayavadanu	
2020	Super Star	
2020	3rd Class	
2020	Navarathna	
2020	Yellow Board	
2020	Kshatriya	
2021	Kanasu Maratakkide	
2021	James	
2021	Tootu Madike	
2021	Pogaru	
2021	Roberrt	
2021	Sugar Factory	
2021	SRK	
2021	Kadala Theerada Barghava	
2021	Rajamarthanda	
2021	Salaga	"I Love You Sanjana" Song
2021	Natabhyankara	
2021	Madhagaja	
2021	Mugil Pete	
2021	Rider	
2021	Dear Sathya	
2021	Bumper	
2021	Badava Rascal	
2021	Trivikrama	
2021	Old Monk	
2021	Godra	
2021	Maichal	
2021	Vidyarthi Vidyarthiniyaru	
2021	Chinnada Gombe	
2021	Bellary	
2021	Shivagami	
2022	Garuda	
2025	Forest	Song - "Paisa Paisa"

=== Advertising director ===
- Agriculture Advertisement with Dr Shivarajkumar

== Awards ==
- Chithrasanthe Award Best Director, Dialogues & Screenplay, Popular Lyricist, 2015 - Chethan Kumar (Movie: Bahaddur)
- Bangalore International Film Festival Award (Movie: Bharjari)
- Siima 2019 Best Lyricist Award Kannada – Yenammi Yenammi (Movie: Ayogya)
- Chithrasante 2019 Popular Lyricist Award Kannada (Movie: Ayogya)
- Hungama Music 2019 - Sound of Fame Award - Song of the year Kannada - Yenammi Yenammi(Movie: Ayogya)
- Chithra Rising Star 2019 - Chethan Kumar
