= Raaj – The Showman =

2009 Indian Kannada-language drama film

Raaj–The Showman
- Poster
- Directed by: Prem
- Screenplay by: Pavan Ranadheera
- Story by: Prem
- Produced by: D. Suresh Gowda; S Srinivasa Murthy
- Starring: Puneeth Rajkumar; Nisha Kothari
- Cinematography: Krishna
- Edited by: Srinivas P. Babu
- Music by: V. Harikrishna
- Production company: Sri Seetha bhairaveshwara Productions
- Distributed by: Jayanna Films
- Release date: 14 August 2009
- Running time: 146 minutes
- Country: India
- Language: Kannada
- Box office: ₹25 crore

Raaj–The Showman is a 2009 Kannada- language action drama film directed by Prem. The film stars Puneeth Rajkumar and Priyanka Kothari in the lead roles. The music was composed by V. Harikrishna, while the cinematography and editing were handled by S. Krishna and Srinivas P. Babu.

== Plot ==
Muththuraj alias Raj, an aspiring actor, wants to become an actor like Dr. Rajkumar. He arrives at the city and becomes a junior artist in films. A wannabe director, who has full confidence in Raj's talents, starts his new film with Raj in the lead role. However, the film's actress Parvathy walks out of the film. Sensing that his chance to become an actor will be under threat, Raj starts pestering Paru to work with him, while Paru develops feelings for Raj. Paru learns that her two gangster relatives are fighting against each other to marry her. Paru is forced to escape with Raj. The director decides to shelve the film after Paru's relatives threaten them. Distraught, Raj reveals his promise to his mother to the director, which makes the director support Raj and begin the shooting of the film, along with Paaru. They complete the film's shooting, with only the climax remaining. Paru's relatives arrive to take away Paru, but Raj stops them and Paru professes her love to Raj, who agrees. A combat ensues in which Raj makes Paru's relatives realize their mistake. Raj's film gets released and becomes a commercial success at the box office. Having fulfilled his dream, Raj and Paru leave for Raj's village, where Raj reunites with his parents and introduces Paru.

== Cast ==
- Puneeth Rajkumar as Muthuraja alias Raaj
- Nisha Kothari as Parvathy alias Paru
- Adi Lokesh as Paru's relative
- Muniraj as Paru's relative
- Mamatha Rao
- Tulasi Shivamani as Paru's Mother
- Shankar Ashwath as Paru's father
- Mico Nagaraj
- Murali Mohan
- Sathyajith
- Shivaram
- Ganesh Rao Kesarkar
- Umesh Punga
- N. M. Suresh
- A. R. Babu
- Madhugiri Prakash

=== Cameo appearances ===
- Ramanithu Chaudhari
- Rekha Vedavyas
- Rangayana Raghu in the song "Muthuraja"
- Sadhu Kokila in the song "Muthuraja"
- Jayamala in the song "Muthuraja"
- Jayanthi in the song " Muthuraja"
- Jaya Prada in the song "Muthuraja"
- Bharathi Vishnuvardhan in the song "Muthuraja"
- Urvashi in the song "Muthuraja"
- Mumaith Khan

== Soundtrack ==
Raaj the Showman

Soundtrack album by V. Harikrishna
- Released: Dec 27, 2009
- Recorded: 2009
- Genre: Feature film soundtrack
- Length: 31:34
- Label: Ashwini Recording Company
- Producer: V. Harikrishna

V. Harikrishna chronology
Rajakumari (2009)	Raaj the Showman (2009)	Vayuputra (2009)
External audio
- Official Audio Jukebox on YouTube

Track list
No.	Title	Lyrics	Singer(s)	Length
1.	"Hey Hey Paro"	V. Nagendra Prasad	Tippu	5:03
2.	"Kuch Kuch Anthide"	Prem	Krishna Beura, Shreya Ghoshal	5:44
3.	"Muthuraja"	V. Nagendra Prasad	Shankar Mahadevan	5:47
4.	"O Kempa"	V. Nagendra Prasad	Dr. Rajkumar, S. P. Balasubrahmanyam	4:13
5.	"Poli Evanu"	V. Nagendra Prasad	Shreya Ghoshal	4:34
6.	"Raaj (Theme)"		Instrumental	1:13
7.	"Raja Heluvagella"	Kaviraj	Prem, Shreya Ghoshal	5:00
Total length:				31:34

== Production ==
Raaj The Showman is considered to be a high-budget film in the Kannada film industry.

== Reception ==
=== Release ===
Raaj the Showman was the first Kannada film to be simultaneously released worldwide and in India.

=== Critical response ===
R.G. Vijayasarathy of The New Indian Express gave 2/5 stars and wrote ""Raaj..." is technically sound and the music is fantastic. The film has everything except a bound script. Director has failed to translate the struggles of an aspiring actor in a convincing story." Manju Shettar of Mid-Day gave 2/5 stars and wrote "Prem hasn't done justice to the script of Raaj - The Showman. He has concentrated on the story rather than the film-making, resulting in a film that lacks creativity."

B. S Srivani of Deccan Herald wrote "As for the story, well, the treatment is sufficient to make it appear just a few hours old. This showman delivers the goods." Bangalore Mirror wrote "Watch film for excellent cinematography and the music. Prem’s direction is not worth commenting, nor are his efforts at the story and dialogues."
