= Dhruva Sarja =

Indian actor

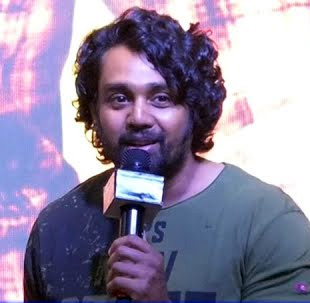
- Born: 6 October 1988 (age 38); Bangalore, Karnataka, India
- Occupation: Actor
- Years active: 2012–present
- Spouse: Prerana Shankar (m. 2019)
- Relatives: Sarja family

Dhruva Sarja (born 6 October 1988) is an Indian actor who appears in Kannada films. He made his acting debut in the 2012 film, Addhuri.

== Early life ==
Dhruva's elder brother Chiranjeevi Sarja, who was also an actor in Kannada films, died on 7 June 2020. The Sarja family originally hails from Sarjapura. Their maternal uncle Arjun Sarja is a South Indian actor, and their maternal grandfather Shakti Prasad was also an actor in Kannada films. Director Kishore Sarja was his maternal uncle and actress Aishwarya Arjun is his cousin.

== Career ==
Sarja debuted in films with the 2012 film Addhuri. His portrayal of Arjun as the male lead, opposite Radhika Pandit, received praise from critics. He signed for his next film Bahaddur with his close friend Chethan Kumar in 2013. The film became commercially successful and in April 2015 he signed for Bharjari. Upcoming films include Pogaru (2021), Martin (2024) and KD - The Devil (2024) and The Untold story of Vijay Salaskar (2025).

A. Harsha and Sarja are also in talks for a movie.

== Personal life ==
Dhruva got engaged to his childhood friend Prerana on December 9, 2018. They married on November 25, 2019, and have two children.

== Filmography ==
Key
†	Denotes films that have not yet been released

List of films and roles
Year	Title	Role(s)	Notes	Ref.
2012	Addhuri	Arjun		
2014	Bahaddur	Ashok Raj Bahaddur		
2017	Bharjari	Surya Rudraprathap		
2018	Prema Baraha	Hanuman devotee	Special appearance in "Jai Hanumantha"	
2021	Pogaru	P. Ramakrishna (Shiva)		
2024	Martin	Arjun Saxena and Martin / Rhino	Double role	
2026	Seetha Payanam	Pawan	Telugu film; cameo appearance	
2026	KD: The Devil	Kaalidasa "KD"		
2026	Criminal †	Shiva	Pre-production	
2027	Chemistry	TBA	Pre-production	
2027	Vasudaiva Kutumbakam	TBA	Shooting	

=== As a voice actor ===
Key
†	Denotes films that have not yet been released

List of films and roles
Year	Title	Role	Notes	Ref.
2019	Kiss	Narrator		
2020	Dhira	Dubbing artist for Tenali Rama	Kannada dubbed version	
2023	Raja Marthanda	Dubbing artist for Chiranjeevi Sarja		

== Awards and nominations ==
List of awards and nominations
Award	Year	Category	Film	Result	Ref.
SIIMA Awards	2012	Best Male Debutant	Addhuri	Won	
SIIMA Awards	2014	Best Actor	Bahaddur	Nominated	
SIIMA Awards	2017	Best Actor	Bharjari	Nominated	
Suvarna Film Awards	2013	Best Debutant	Addhuri	Won	
Udaya Film Awards	2013	Best Debutant - Male	Addhuri	Won	
