= Bharaate =

2019 Indian action drama film

- Theatrical poster
- Directed by: Chethan Kumar
- Written by: Chethan Kumar
- Produced by: Suprith
- Starring: Sriimurali; Sreeleela
- Cinematography: Girish R. Gowda
- Edited by: Deepu S. Kumar
- Music by: Arjun Janya
- Production company: Sri Jagadguru Movies
- Distributed by: B. K. Gandhadhar
- Release date: 18 October 2019
- Running time: 166 minutes
- Country: India
- Language: Kannada

Bharaate (transl. Blast) is a 2019 Indian Kannada-language action drama film written and directed by Chethan Kumar. The film is produced by Suprith under the Sri Jagadguru Movies banner and presented by Sriimurali under Aagastya Enterprises. It features Sriimurali in a dual role, alongside Sreeleela. The supporting cast includes Tara, Rangayana Raghu, Suman, P. Sai Kumar, P. Ravi Shankar, Ayyappa P. Sharma, Sharath Lohitashwa, All Ok and Sadhu Kokila. The score and soundtrack were composed by Arjun Janya, while cinematography and editing were handled by Girish R. Gowda and Deepu S. Kumar.

Bharaate was released on 18 October 2019, receiving mixed reviews but becoming a commercial success at the box office.

== Plot ==
Jagan is a tour guide and an Ayurvedic practitioner in Jodhpur. Radha, a tourist, visits Jodhpur with her friends and subsequently tries to commit suicide at Mehrangarh, but she is stopped by Jagan, who convinces her to enjoy her trip instead. Radha eventually leaves the city without saying goodbye to Jagan. Later, Jagan's mother takes him to Badami to perform a puja, where he meets Radha again.

Jagan attempts to propose to Radha at the bus station, but she is attacked by Veerappa's henchmen. Jagan rescues Radha, who reveals that she is from the royal Ballala family and that her father will not accept the marriage proposal. Jagan consoles her and promises to convince her family. He arrives at their village just in time to thwart attackers sent by Pallava, a rival of Ballala's.

During the festival of Durga Puja, the Ballala family is engaged in a conflict with a rival group and Jagan intervenes again. He confesses that his grandfather is Jayarathnakara and that he comes from the Rathnakara family. The Ballala family then offers an alliance with the Rathnakaras by proposing the marriage of Ballala's brother to Rathnakara's daughter, who rejects the proposal. Dejected and angry, Ballala's brother attacks everyone at the Ratnakara residence in an attempt to kill Rathnakara's daughter, but he is accidentally slain by Jagan's father. In retaliation, Ballala slaughters the Rathnakaras but spares Jagan and his parents and instructs them to leave the city forever.

The feuds between the four families continue, leading first to Radha's captivity, an ensuing gang battle, and ultimately, a truce. Jagan and Radha are finally reunited after many travails, and they receive everyone's approval to marry.

== Cast ==
- Sriimurali as Jagan Mohana Ratnakara and Jayaratnakara (dual role)
- Sreeleela as Radha, Ballala's granddaughter
- Tara as Jagan's mother
- Rangayana Raghu as Patela, Jagan's uncle
- Suman as Jagan's father
- P. Sai Kumar as Ballala
- P. Ravi Shankar as Pallava
- Ayyappa P. Sharma as Veerappa Nayaka
- Sharath Lohitashwa as Nayaka
- All Ok as a Rajasthan guide
- Sadhu Kokila as Radha's uncle
- Manjunath Gowda as Radha's brother
- Raj Deepak Shetty as Radha's brother

== Soundtrack ==
The music was composed by Arjun Janya and released on Anand Audio.

Bharaate

Soundtrack album by Arjun Janya
- Released: 8 August 2019
- Genre: Film soundtrack
- Length: 20:15
- Language: Kannada
- Label: Anand Audio
- Producer: Suprith

Arjun Janya chronology
| Ellidde Illi Tanaka (2019) | Bharaate (2019) | Kotigobba 3 (2020) |

All lyrics are written by Chethan Kumar.

Tracklist
| No. | Title | Singer(s) | Length |
|---|---|---|---|
| 1. | "Bhara Bhara Bharaate" | Sriimurali | 3:40 |
| 2. | "Yoo Yoo" | Vijay Prakash | 3:45 |
| 3. | "Roarism" | Chandan Shetty | 4:07 |
| 4. | "Bandanthe Rajakumara" | Santhosh Venky, Manasa Holla | 4:20 |
| 5. | "Jayaratnakara" | Sunil Gujagonda | 5:18 |
| Total length: | | | 20:15 |

== Release ==
Bharaate was released on 18 October 2019.

== Reception ==
=== Critical response ===
Vinay Lokesh of The Times of India gave the film 3.5/5 stars and wrote, "Bharaate is tailor made for those who have a penchant for commercial films." A. Sharadhaa of The New Indian Express gave it 3/5 stars, stating, "Catering to popular tastes, Bharaate brings across Chethan's brand of cinema and sees Sriimurali subliminally pushing forward his image." S. Shyam Prasad of Bangalore Mirror rated the film 2/5 stars and wrote, "The problem with this film is too much of everything." Aravind Shwetha of The News Minute stated that the "storyline is a hotchpotch of situations from standard commercial films."

=== Box office ===
Bharaate earned ₹83.6 million on its first day. By the end of its theatrical run, it grossed ₹120 million and completed 100 days at the box office.

== Accolades ==
| Award | Category | Recipient | Result | Ref |
|---|---|---|---|---|
| 9th South Indian International Movie Awards | Best Film | Sri Jagadguru Movies | Nominated | |
| 9th South Indian International Movie Awards | Best Director | Chethan Kumar | Nominated | |
| 9th South Indian International Movie Awards | Best Actor | Sriimurali | Nominated | |
| 9th South Indian International Movie Awards | Best Actor in Negative Role | Sai Kumar | Won | |
| 9th South Indian International Movie Awards | Best Cinematographer | Girish.R.Gowda | Nominated | |
| 9th South Indian International Movie Awards | Best Music Director | Arjun Janya | Nominated | |
| 9th South Indian International Movie Awards | Best Female Playback Singer | Manasa Holla "Bandanthe Rajakumara" | Nominated | |
