= Yaare Koogadali =

- Release poster
- Directed by: Samuthirakani
- Written by: Samuthirakani
- Produced by: Parvathamma Rajkumar
- Starring: Puneeth Rajkumar; Bhavana; Yogesh
- Cinematography: M. Sukumar
- Edited by: Deepu S. Kumar
- Music by: V. Harikrishna
- Production company: Poornima Enterprises
- Release date: 20 December 2012
- Running time: 138 minutes
- Country: India
- Language: Kannada

Yaare Koogadali (transl. Whoever shouts) is a 2012 Indian Kannada-language action thriller film written and directed by Samuthirakani, starring Puneeth Rajkumar and Bhavana. Parvathamma Rajkumar and Raghavendra Rajkumar, Puneeth's mother and brother, respectively, produced the film under for Poornima Enterprises. The film is a remake of Samuthirakani's Tamil film Poraali (2011). It completed a 50 days run in 49 centres in Karnataka.

== Plot ==
The story begins on a rainy night when Kumara (Puneeth Rajkumar) and Natesha (Yogesh) escape from NIMHANS and enter Bangalore with their past actions unclear. They settle at Shishupala's (Sadhu Kokila) residence and find jobs at a petrol bunk. Bharathi (Bhavana) comes into Kumara's life. Her initial wrong belief about him changes as soon as she gets to know his kind heart when she sees him helping people in need (including her). She pursues him to take her as his girlfriend, but he is not interested and warns her away due to his lifestyle. However, the residents of his neighbourhood convince him that she loves him and is a good girl. He accepts her. Soon, love blooms between them. Kumara, along with his friends, starts a venture where customers can call and order a product, such as groceries, and the friends would buy and deliver them at a service charge. While distributing their venture's ads, they narrowly escape being spotted by a van with goons spearheaded by Ravishankar who are in search of Kumara and Natesha. Soon, their business grows well. This prompts Shishupala to give an advertisement about their venture in a magazine with their photo. But due to the advertisement, the goons come to their store to attack them. Within a few minutes, a childhood friend of Kumara arrives in Bangalore and shares some news.

The goons convince everyone in Kumara's neighbourhood that he is mentally ill. Bharathi also happened to know the news, and Kumara narrates his past to her. Kumara was born in a wealthy family and was very intelligent in his studies. But his father pursued his mother as an insane person to marry another woman. Immediately after the marriage, Kumara's stepmother's family also shifted to their house and started to control the whole family. The brother and father of the stepmother stopped Kumara's education by stating that he had a mental illness like his mother. Kumara's grandfather, who got to know these conspiracies, had Kumara fly from the village to ensure his good life with the help of his henchman Era. But the plan failed as the family of the stepmother killed Kumar's grandfather. The little Kumara never knew these cruelties towards him until Era came back and told him the truth after many years. By knowing all the doings of his father, stepmother, and her family, Kumara rushed to kill all of them, but was caught by their goons. They admitted him to a mental hospital, where the doctor continuously gave him shock treatments by accepting bribes. All the treatments in the Asylum made Kumara lose his strength. Another doctor in the asylum (Girish Karnad) was noticing the plight of Kumara. He showed sympathy towards him and advised him to go to another place where no one knew him, so that he could lead a good life there with new relations instead of killing his enemies. By these words, Kumara decides to flee from the asylum. While he was leaving, Natesha followed him, whom Kumara saved from a mental stroke. Kumar's grandfather wrote all the property in his name, so the family is still searching for Kumara to snatch the property from him.

Kumara said to Bharathi that they should leave the city before they could reach him. But Bharathi pursued him to fight back with them instead of running, as it would make them run their life. Finally, Kumar fights with them and gives all his property to the family by warning that, in the aftermath, no one should disturb him as he will live in this city.

== Cast ==
- Puneeth Rajkumar as Kumara
- Bhavana as Bharathi
- Yogesh as Natesha
- Sindhu Lokanath as Kasturi
- Girish Karnad
- Nivedhitha
- Sadhu Kokila as Shishupala
- P. Ravi Shankar
- Malavika Avinash
- Rakesh Adiga
- Shobaraj
- Achyuth Kumar Gandhi
- Mico Nagaraj
- Danny Kuttappa
- Hulivan Gangadharaiah
- Charmy Kaur as an item number "Hello 123 Testing"

== Production ==
The first schedule of Yaare Koogadali took place in Bangalore and lasted 15 days. A number of actresses including Sameera Reddy were considered for the lead actress before Bhavana was finalised, marking her second collaboration with Puneeth after Jackie. The film's title was inspired from an old song "Yaare Koogadali Oore Horadali" in Sampathige Savaal which featured Puneeth's father Dr. Rajkumar in the lead role.

== Soundtrack ==
Yaare Koogadali

Soundtrack album by V. Harikrishna
- Released: 20 December 2012
- Recorded: 2012
- Genre: Feature film soundtrack
- Length: 19:59
- Label: Anand Audio
- Producer: Parvathamma Rajkumar
External audio
- Official Audio Jukebox on YouTube

V. Harikrishna scored the songs and soundtrack. Director Yogaraj Bhat wrote the lyrics for one song, while the rest were written by Dr. V Nagendra Prasad.

Track listing
No.	Title	Lyrics	Singer(s)	Length
1.	"Hello 1 2 3 Mike Testing"	Yogaraj Bhat	Mamta Sharma, Udit Narayan	4:40
2.	"Yaarivano Yaarivano"	V. Nagendra Prasad	Sonu Nigam, Karthik, Anuradha Bhat	4:33
3.	"Kempaado Kempaado"	V. Nagendra Prasad	Kailash Kher	4:27
4.	"Gaaliyalli Eejuvaase"	V. Nagendra Prasad	Anuradha Bhat	1:25
5.	"Yaarivano Yaarivano"	V. Nagendra Prasad	Karthik, Anuradha Bhat	4:44

== Release ==
The film was released on 20 December 2012.

=== Critical reception ===
G S Kumar from The Times of India scored the film at 3.5 out of 5 stars and says "Girish Karnad impresses with his small but important role as a doctor. Music by V Harikrishna has some catchy tunes. Cinematography by M Sukumaran is amazing". Srikanth Srinivasa from Rediff.com scored the film at 3 out of 5 stars and wrote "Harikrishna's background score is breezy and the film doesn't bore the viewer with unwanted songs. This movie is a neat family entertainer and worth a watch". Indo-Asian News Service wrote, "Sukumar's camera work is excellent, while Guru Prasad's dialogues are funny and precise. Overall, it is an enjoyable film, which offers a lot of variety of entertainment". Shruti I L from Daily News and Analysis wrote, "Yes, there could have been less bloodshed and better music. Actors like Achyutha and Rakesh should also have been put to better use and the second half could have been crisper. But don’t make these your reasons to not watch the film". A critic from Bangalore Mirror wrote, "The background music is loud and hampers a decent sleep while watching the film. The camerawork is better than most other aspects of the film. Sukadhare’s break from filmmaking has not worked for him or the audience".

=== Awards ===
At the 2nd South Indian International Movie Awards, Yaare Koogadali received three nominations: Best Supporting Actor (Yogesh), Best Female Playback Singer (Mamatha Sharma) and Best Comedian (Sadhu Kokila). Sadhu Kokila was the only winner.
