= KD: The Devil =

2026 Indian film KD

- Promotional poster
- Directed by: Prem
- Written by: Prem; Kranti Kumar (Dialogues)
- Produced by: Venkat K. Narayana
- Starring: Dhruva Sarja; Sanjay Dutt; Shilpa Shetty; V. Ravichandran; Reeshma Nanaiah; Ramesh Aravind
- Cinematography: William David
- Edited by: Sanketh Achar
- Music by: Arjun Janya
- Production company: KVN Productions
- Release date: 30 April 2026
- Running time: 141 minutes
- Country: India
- Language: Kannada

KD: The Devil is a 2026 Indian Kannada-language period action thriller film written and directed by Prem and produced by Venkat K. Narayana for KVN Productions. The film stars Dhruva Sarja in the title role, alongside Sanjay Dutt, Shilpa Shetty, V. Ravichandran, Ramesh Aravind, Reeshma Nanaiah, P. Ravi Shankar and Nora Fatehi. The music was composed by Arjun Janya, while the cinematography and editing were handled by William David and Sanketh Achar, respectively.

KD: The Devil was theatrically released on 30 April 2026. It received negative reviews from the critics, emerging as a box-office bomb.

== Plot ==
In 1980, Tony Breganza, a ruthless African crime lord, comes to Bengaluru and kills several police officers with their families, were former police chief Soorappa also became his target. When the police force and his family instigate him why he is targeted by Tony Breganza, then he tells the story of Kaalidasa aka KD, a notorious mass murderer kingpin, whom Soorappa helped years ago, thus became Tony Breganza's target.

Back in 1975, Kaalidasa, also known as Kaali, who begins as a small-time, meek individual with modest ambitions—often depicted as a kerosene dealer, milk supplier or petty criminal living within a close-knit social and family circle, who also works at the wrestling club belonging to his idol, feared don and former wrestler Dhaak Deva, who now rules the underworld of Bengaluru. His life changes when a series of missteps and external circumstances push him into contact with powerful crime syndicates. Influenced by his admiration for Deva, and further complicated by his relationships, particularly with his principled school headmaster brother Dharma and his eccentric love interest Machhlakshmi, Kaali gradually becomes drawn into a world defined by violence, loyalty, and shifting power dynamics. Kaali’s involvement in the underworld intensifies into a broader struggle for survival and identity.

Kaalidas is fan of Deva, as Deva gives him blood when Kaali is get into an accident in his childhood, and saves him and his wife Sathyavati from an attack in a movie theatre. Later, Kaali defeats Deva in a friendly wrestling match and the news goes viral. Deva wants to stand in elections against his opposition party supported by Dharma, whose leader is Dharma's childhood friend and crooked political schemer named Annayyappa. As the news of Kaali beating Deva spreads, Deva's reputation loses for losing in front of a simple boy. Enraged, Deva's right hand Kavi attacks Machhlakshmi and humiliates her by trimming her hair. When Kaali went to Deva for justice, Deva dismisses him and orders his men to kill all of Kaali's family in 24 hours. Kaali got courage later when goons attacks his family and kills all of them. He, along Dharma goes to Deva, where kaali chops Deva's head. He takes it to police station where Sathyavati comes to take Deva's head. Sathyavati announces that whoever kills Kaali will get all of Deva's empire and will win her, to which, shockingly, Dharma responds and married Sathyavati. Dharma was in love with Sathyavati for a long time. Kaali was taken to police custody while we get to know Kaala Bhairava will come to save Kaali in part 2- KD- Evil's kingdom, were Tony Breganza returns from South Africa to defeat Kaali.

== Cast ==
- Dhruva Sarja as Kaalidasa "KD", the main protagonist, who later became a kingpin by defeating Deva
- Sanjay Dutt as Dhaak Deva, a former wrestler and feared don, who ruled Bengaluru's underworld
- Shilpa Shetty as Sathyavati, Deva's wife and Dharma's former lover
- V. Ravichandran as Annayyappa, a political schemer and Dharma's childhood friend
- Ramesh Aravind as Dharma, Kaali's brother, Sathyavati's former lover and a school headmaster
- Reeshma Nanaiah as Machhlakshmi, Kaali's eccentric lover
- P. Ravi Shankar as Soorappa, IPS, the Bengaluru police chief who helps Kaali
- Yash Shetty as Kavi, Deva's deputy
- Nora Fatehi as Senorita, a dancer (removed scenes, including her appearance in item number "Sarse Ninna Seraga Sarse")
- Sudeepa as Kaala Bhairava "KB", a kingpin who rescues and aids Kaali (cameo appearance)

== Production ==
Actor Dhruva Sarja announced his new project with director Prem and producer Venkat K. Narayana under the KVN Productions, on 18 April 2022, tentatively titled #KVN4. The film's title as KD: The Devil was announced on 20 October 2024. Reeshma Nanaiah joined the cast to play the female lead. Sanjay Dutt, Shilpa Shetty, V. Ravichandran and Ramesh Aravind joined the cast in important roles. The film's Sanjay making his second Kannada film after KGF: Chapter 2 (2022), and Shilpa return in Kannada film after 21 years since Auto Shankar (2005). Principal photography of the film began after a muhurat shot on 24 April 2022 and filming commenced on 22 October 2024. In September 2025, Sudeepa was confirmed to play a cameo in the film. Nora Fatehi joined the cast, in her Kannada film debut, but later her scenes including the song "Sarse Ninna Seraga Sarse" was removed, due to criticism and backlash of Hindi version of the song.

== Soundtrack ==
KD: The Devil

Soundtrack album by Arjun Janya
- Genre: Feature film soundtrack
- Language: Kannada
- Label: Anand Audio

Arjun Janya chronology
45 (2025)	KD: The Devil (2026)	Trishulam (TBA)

The music of the film was composed by Arjun Janya. The music rights of the film were acquired by Anand Audio. The first single titled "Shiva Shiva" was released on 24 December 2024. The second single titled "Settagalla" was released on 29 March 2025.

Track listing
No.	Title	Lyrics	Singer(s) and Artist(s)	Length
1.	"Shiva Shiva"	Manjunath BS	Prem, Kailash Kher	3:37
2.	"Settagalla"	Prem	Mika Singh	3:40
3.	"Annthamma Jodetthu Kano"	Manjunath B.S.	Prem	3:57
4.	"Sarse Ninna Sarega Sarse"	Prem	Aishwarya Rangarajan	3:55
5.	"Nuggi Hodi"	Prem	Shankar Mahadevan	4:08
6.	"Come On Kaali"	Prem	Anthony Daasan	3:15

== Release ==
=== Theatrical ===
KD: The Devil was theatrically released on 30 April 2026 after facing multiple delays. The film received an A (adults only) certificate from the CBFC due to gory violence.

=== Home media ===
The film began streaming on ZEE5 from 5 June 2026 in Kannada and dubbed versions of Tamil, Telugu and Malayalam languages.

== Reception ==
Sruthi Ganapathy Ramanol, writing for The Hollywood Reporter India commented that "Excess is the real devil here". Latha Srinivasan of NDTV gave 2 stars out of 5 and said that "The film makes a big entrance but doesn't keep you hooked till the end".

Susmita Sameera reviewing for The Times of India gave 2.5 stars out of 5 and writes that "Overall, KD – The Devil delivers a mixed cinematic experience" Vivek M.V. of The Hindu observed that "With a semblance of story and a decent character arc for the protagonist, ‘KD’, starring Dhruva Sarja and directed by Prem, is aimed at lovers of loud ‘masala’ movie lovers who care less for depth in writing."

Jagadish Angadi of Deccan Herald feels that "Despite a star-studded ensemble, including veterans such as Doddanna and Dattanna, and a guest appearance by Sudeepa, the film does little justice to its talent pool." Sanjay Ponnappa of India Today rated it 2.5 stars out of 5 and said that "This Dhruvl Sarja-Sanjay Dutt-starrer period action drama is entertaining in bits but is mostly loud, messy and violent."

== Controversy ==
The film's director Prem and production house KVN Productions faced criticism over the lyrics of the song "Sarse Ninna Seraga Sarse", which was released as the third single from the soundtrack. The music video of the song, which prominently featured a Hindi-language version of the song, starred Nora Fatehi and Sanjay Dutt. The song faced backlash, while online users expressed their ire towards the lyrics, labeling them as “vulgar” and “suggestive”. The song was soon removed from YouTube.

== Sequel ==
In the film's end credits, a proposed sequel titled KD 2: Evil's Kingdom was announced.
