= Snehitaru =

- Poster
- Directed by: K. Ram Narayan
- Written by: K. Ram Narayan Shyam Shivamogga
- Produced by: Soundarya Jagadish
- Starring: Tarun Chandra; Vijay Raghavendra; Srujan Lokesh; Pranitha; Ravishankar Gowda; Master Snehith
- Cinematography: M. R. Seenu
- Edited by: Ganesh Mallaiah
- Music by: V. Harikrishna
- Production company: Soundarya Jagadish Films
- Distributed by: Jayanna Combines
- Release date: 5 October 2012
- Country: India
- Language: Kannada
- Budget: ₹ 4 crore
- Box office: ₹ 8 crore

Snehitaru (transl. Friends) is a 2012 Indian Kannada-language action drama film written and directed by Ram Narayan and produced by Soundarya Jagadish. The film features as an ensemble cast of Vijay Raghavendra, Tarun Chandra, Pranitha, Srujan Lokesh, Ravishankar Gowda and Master Snehith. Actors Darshan and Nikita Thukral are making special appearances, with Darshan playing a pivotal role.

Director Ram Narayan has also written the screenplay and dialogues for the film. V. Harikrishna is the score and soundtrack composer. The film was theatrically released on 5 October 2012 across Karnataka cinema halls. The multi-starrer film had a decent run in at the box office.

== Cast ==
- Vijay Raghavendra
- Tarun Chandra
- Srujan Lokesh
- Ravishankar Gowda
- Pranitha as Anjali
- Master Snehith
- Ramesh Bhat
- Tennis Krishna
- Bullet Prakash
- Sihi Kahi Chandru
- Girija Lokesh
- Shobhraj
- Tennis Krishna
- Chikkanna
- Shankar Rao
- Sadhu Kokila
- Triveni Rao
- Harris Johnny
- Ravi Chethan
- Sihi Kahi Chandru
- R. G. Vijayasarathy
- Victory Vasu
- Ramesh Pandith
- Laya Kokila
- Sarojamma Maarimutthu
- V. Manohar
- Mohan Juneja
- Mimicry Dayanand
- Arasu Maharaj as Don Bande
- Kuri Prathap
- Rockline Sudhakar
- Bullet Prakash
- Darshan in a special appearance as Suryaprakash
- Nikita Thukral as an item number

== Production ==
After Mast Maja Maadi and Appu and Pappu, this is the third film of family of Soundarya Jagadish banner. Master Snehith, son of couple Soundarya and Rekha has an important role in this film. The little star is challenging the stars like Darshan and Nikitha who are in guest roles in this film.

== Soundtrack ==
Snehitaru

Soundtrack album by V. Harikrishna
- Released: 23 July 2012
- Genre: Feature film soundtrack
- Label: Ashwini Audio

V. Harikrishna composed the music for the film and the soundtracks, with lyrics for the soundtracks penned by Kaviraj, Shyam Shivamogga and K. Ramnarayan. The album has five soundtracks.

Track listing
No.	Title	Lyrics	Singer(s)	Length
1.	"Badapayi Hrudayake"	Kaviraj	Sonu Nigam
2.	"Badukodu Hege Naa"	Shyam Shivamogga	Vani Harikrishna
3.	"Thattu Chappale"	K. Ramnarayan, Shyam Shivamogga	V. Harikrishna, Vani Harikrishna
4.	"Thindi Aytha Sir"	K. Ramnarayan	V. Harikrishna, Hemanth, Chetan Sosca
5.	"Thirty Forty Site Iddre"	Shyam Shivamogga	Vani Harikrishna, Priya Himesh

== Reception ==
=== Critical response ===
A critic from The Times of India scored the film at 3 out of 5 stars and says "Pranitha is impressive. Darshan walks away with all the honours in a guest appearance. Master Snehith is sweet in his childish role. Music by V Harikrishna and camera by MR Seenu are added attractions". A critic from DNA wrote "Snehitaru looks more like a platform that producer Soundarya Jagdeesh has used to reintroduce his son and child actor, Snehit. So if you are planning to give the film a miss, all we’ll say is that you are not missing much!". Srikanth Srinivasa from Rediff.com scored the film at 2 out of 5 stars and says "Vijay Raghavendra and Ravishankar are good. Snehith impresses while Pranitha looks good. Ramesh Bhat and Girija Lokesh are adequate. Songs by Gridhar are average. Snehitaru is a light-hearted entertainer". A critic from Pinkvilla wrote ""Snehitharu" is a mass entertainer that will keep the audience fully engaged. It has an interesting script coupled with good performances and neat technical work". A critic from Bangalore Mirror wrote "He seems to have an unending supply of tunes that hit the bull’s eye every time. His wife and son have also joined forces with him as singers in this film. MR Seenu, the cinematographer is another star performer in the film".
