= Udaya Film Awards =

- Awarded for: Excellence in cinematic achievements for Kannada cinema
- Country: India
- Presented by: Knockout, Sun Feast, Vivel Active & Udaya TV Channel
- First award: 1997 - 2012

The Udaya Film Awards is the most prominent award ceremony for Kannada films presented annually by Udaya TV, a Kannada-language division of the Sun Network, from the south-Indian state of Karnataka. The awards honour both artistic and technical excellence in the Kannada language film industry. Held since 1998, the ceremony was discontinued for over 6 years before resuming in 2006. The sponsors have included Knockout and Sun Feast and Vivel Active.

== Best Actor ==
The Udaya Film Award for Best Male Actor has been awarded since 1998.

Year	Actor	Film
2012	Upendra	Kalpana
2011	Darshan	Saarathi
2010	Puneeth Rajkumar	Jackie
2009
2008	Chetan Kumar	Aa Dinagalu
2007	Ganesh	Cheluvina Chittara
2006	Shivarajkumar	Jogi
2002	Upendra	Nagarahavu
1998	Upendra	A
1997	Ramesh Aravind	O Mallige

== Best Actress ==
The Udaya Film Award for Best Female Actor has been awarded since 1998.

Year	Actress	Film
2012	Radhika Pandit	Addhuri
2011	Ramya	Sanju Weds Geetha
2010	Radhika Pandit	Krishnan Love Story
2009
2008	Ramya	Mussanjemaatu
2007	Amoolya	Cheluvina Chittara
2006	Ramya	Amrithadhare
2002	Jyothika	Nagarahavu
1998	Vijayalakshmi	Nagamandala
1997	Suman Nagarkar	Hoomale

== Best Director ==
The Udaya Film Award for Best Director has been awarded since 1998.

Year	Director	Film
2012	A. P. Arjun	Addhuri
2010	Shashank	Krishnan Love Story
2009
2008
2007	Prakash	Milana
2006	Prem	Jogi
1998	T. S. Nagabharana	Nagamandala

== Best Film ==
The Udaya Film Award for Best Film has been awarded since 1998.

Year	Film
2012	Krantiveera Sangolli Rayanna
2010	Jackie
2009
2008
2007	Cheluvina Chittara
2006	Jogi
1998	Nagamandala

== Best Supporting Actor ==
The Udaya Film Award for Best Supporting Male Actor has been awarded since 2006.

Year	Actor	Film
2012	Dharma	Edegarike
2010	Rangayana Raghu
2009
2008
2007	Sharath Lohitashwa	Aa Dinagalu
2006	V. Ravichandran	Aham Premasmi

== Best Supporting Actress ==
The Udaya Film Award for Best Supporting Female Actor has been awarded since 1997.

Year	Actress	Film
2012	Tara	Bhagirathi
2010
2009
2008
2007
2006	Arundhati Nag	Jogi
1997	Chaithali	O Mallige

== Best Music Director ==
The Udaya Film Award for Best Music Director has been awarded since 2006.

Year	Composer	Film
2012	V. Harikrishna	Addhuri
2010
2009
2008
2007	Mano Murthy	Milana
2006	Gurukiran	Jogi

== Best Male Playback Singer ==
The Udaya Film Award for Best Male Playback Singer has been awarded since 2006.

Year	Singer	Film
2012	Sadhu Kokila	Edegarike
2010	Rajesh Krishnan
2009
2008
2007	Gurukiran	Pallakki
2006	Chetan Sosca	Nenapirali

== Best Female Playback Singer ==
The Udaya Film Award for Best Female Playback Singer has been awarded since 2006.

Year	Actress	Film
2012	Indu Nagaraj	Govindaya Namaha
2010	Lakshmi Nataraj	Aptharakshaka
2009
2008
2007	Nanditha	Duniya
2006	Chaitra H. G.	Amrithadhare

== Best Cinematographer ==
Year	Cinematographer	Film
2012
2010
2009
2008
2007	Krishnakumar	Maathaad Maathaadu Mallige
2006
