= Ambari (film) =

- Poster
- Directed by: A. P. Arjun
- Written by: A. P. Arjun
- Produced by: V Lakshmikanth; H. S. Suresh
- Starring: Yogesh; Supreetha
- Cinematography: Satya Hegde
- Edited by: Deepu S. Kumar
- Music by: V. Harikrishna
- Production company: Sri Lambodara Combines
- Release date: 30 January 2009
- Running time: 140 minutes
- Country: India
- Language: Kannada

Ambari is a 2009 Indian Kannada-language romantic drama film directed by A. P. Arjun in his directorial debut. The film stars Yogesh and Supreetha in the lead roles, while Petrol Prasanna, Rangayana Raghu, Sandeep, Dinesh Mangalore, Kishori Ballal and Aruna Balraj in supporting roles.

Ambari was released on 30 January 2009 to positive reviews from critics and became a commercial success at the box office.

== Plot ==
Dhananjaya is a cobbler leading a simple life with his drunkard father. Saraswathi alias Saro is a rich girl who meets Dhananjaya and falls for his kind-heartedness. Dhananjaya and Saro undertake a bicycle journey to Taj Mahal, where they are tailed by a gangster named Gani, who received a contract from Saro's father to finish Dhananjaya due to status issues. Gani also wants to exact revenge on Dhananjaya for injuring him in a fight. Despite getting stabbed by Gani in a fight, Dhananjaya finally brings Saro to visit Taj Mahal on her birthday and dies from his injuries, while Saro gets devastated.

== Cast ==
- Yogesh as Dhananjaya
- Supreetha as Saraswathi/Saro
- Rangayana Raghu as Dhananjaya's father
- Petrol Prasanna as Ghani
- Sandeep
- Kishori Ballal as Saro's grandmother
- Dinesh Mangalore as Saro's father
- Aruna Balraj as Saro's mother
- Mahesh Raj
- Vikram Mor
- Mahendran
- Vinod Varadaraj

== Soundtrack ==
All the songs are composed and scored by V. Harikrishna.

Sl No	Song title	Singer(s)	Lyricist
1	"Yaare Nee Devatheya"	Chetan Sosca	A. P. Arjun
2	"Aakasha Neene"	Sonu Nigam	Jayanth Kaikini
3	"Nee Sokalu"	Shreya Ghoshal	A. P. Arjun
4	"O Aluthaave"	S. P. Balasubrahmanyam	A. P. Arjun
5	"Ele Kenchi Taare"	V. Harikrishna, Emil	V. Nagendra Prasad
6	"Aakasha Neene"	K. S. Chithra	Jayanth Kaikini

== Reception ==
=== Critical response ===
The Times of India gave 3/5 stars; praising the cinematography and action sequences and wrote "An excellent show by the director who has selected a romantic story with freshness in the script and neat narration though it drags on a little in the second half." R G Vijayasarathy of Rediff gave 2/5 stars and wrote "Ambari could have been more interesting but it ends up as just an average fare."

== Awards ==
- Karnataka State Film Award for Best Actor - Yogesh
- Karnataka State Film Award for Best Male Playback Singer - Chetan Sosca - "Yaare Nee Devateya"
- Filmfare Award for Best Male Playback Singer - Kannada - Chetan Sosca - "Yaare Nee Devateya"
- Suvarna Award for Best Male Playback singer - Chetan Sosca - "Yaare Nee Devateya"
- Mirchi Music award for Best Male Playback singer - Chetan Sosca - "Yaare Nee Devateya"
