= Pogaru =

2021 Indian action drama film

- Theatrical release poster
- Directed by: Nanda Kishore
- Screenplay by: Nanda Kishore
- Dialogues by: Prashanth Rajappa
- Story by: Arun Balaji
- Produced by: B. K. Gangadhar
- Starring: Dhruva Sarja; Rashmika Mandanna
- Cinematography: Vijay Milton
- Edited by: Mahesh S
- Music by: Chandan Shetty
- Production company: Sri Jagadguru Movies
- Release date: 19 February 2021
- Running time: 160 minutes
- Country: India
- Language: Kannada
- Budget: ₹25−30 crore
- Box office: ₹45 crore

Pogaru (transl. Haughtiness) is a 2021 Indian Kannada-language action drama film directed by Nanda Kishore and produced by B. K. Gangadhar. The film stars Dhruva Sarja, alongside Rashmika Mandanna, Chikkanna, P. Ravi Shankar, Pavitra Lokesh, Raghavendra Rajkumar, Sampath Raj, Dhananjay, Kai Greene, Morgan Aste and Dharma.

The soundtrack was composed by Chandan Shetty, while the musical score was composed by V. Harikrishna. The cinematography and editing were handled by Vijay Milton and S. Mahesh S respectively. The film was planned to be simultaneously shot in Kannada and Telugu languages, but the idea was dropped and the dubbed versions of Telugu and Tamil languages were released, with the Tamil version titled Semma Thimiru.

Pogaru was released on 19 February 2021 to mixed reviews from critics and became a commercial success.

== Plot ==
A young Shiva loses his father, who was killed by JB, as his father became a witness to JB's crimes. Shiva is unaware of his father's death and learns about his mother Lakshmi's second marriage with Executive Officer Ramakrishna from his dying grandmother, who makes Shiva promise that he will take care of Lakshmi. He agrees and asks Lakshmi to come with him without Ramakrishna and his daughter (Shiva's sister). Lakshmi disagrees which leads Shiva to become a rogue. Years later, he becomes a notorious rogue, who hates Ramakrishna and his daughter for snatching Lakshmi away from him. Shiva meets a teacher named Geetha and falls for her good nature.

JB decides to grab the colony but is opposed by Ramakrishna. JB's son, Daali, takes Shiva's help. Shiva agrees and gets Ramakrishna arrested. He also takes his sister to Daali's hideout, but thrashes Daali and his henchmen as he realizes his sister's affection. Shiva's sister is injured in the fight and is taken to the hospital. Lakshmi berates Shiva and tells him to never show his face again. Shiva talks about his difficulties to Lord Hanuman, and Geetha also realizes her mistake and reconciles with Shiva. Daali goes into a coma which makes JB enraged and kidnaps the colony's kids to burn them alive. Shiva saves them and defeats JB's bodyguards and burns JB alive. Shiva reunites with his family and changes his ways.

== Cast ==
- Dhruva Sarja as Shiva
- Rashmika Mandanna as Geetha
- Sampath Raj as JB
- Dhananjaya as Daali
- Chikkanna as Shiva's friend
- Raghavendra Rajkumar as Shiva's Teacher/Guru
- Pavitra Lokesh as Lakshmi, Shiva's mother
- P. Ravi Shankar as Ramakrishna, Shiva's step-father
- Raj Deepak Shetty
- Kai Greene
- Kuri Prathap
- Bullet Prakash
- Tara Anuradha
- Morgan Aste
- Dharma as Inspector Aditya
- Mayuri Kyatari as Shiva's step-sister
- Girija Lokesh as Shiva's grandmother
- Kari Subbu
- John Lucas as JB's bodygyard
- Jo Lindner
- Shankar Ashwath as Geetha's father

== Music ==
Pogaru

Soundtrack album by Chandan Shetty
- Released: 2021
- Recorded: 2019
- Genre: Feature film soundtrack
- Length: 15:56
- Label: Anand Audio

Chandan Shetty chronology
Digbayam (2019)	Pogaru (2021)	Dubari (2022)

Chandan Shetty composed the songs for the movie, and the audio was released on 14 February 2021 in Davangere with ex-CM Siddaramaiah as Chief guest.

Kannada (Pogaru)

No.	Title	Lyrics	Music	Singer(s)	Length
1.	"Bande Bathale"	Chethan Kumar	Chandan Shetty	Vijay Prakash	3:56
2.	"Karabuu"	Chandan Shetty	Chandan Shetty	Chandan Shetty	3:39
3.	"Pogaru Title Track"	Chandan Shetty	Chandan Shetty	Chandan Shetty, Shashank Sheshagiri, Aniruddha Sastry	3:51
4.	"Jeeva Kottavalu"	Aniruddha Sastry	Gummineni Vijay	Aniruddha Sastry	4:24
5.	"Dialogue Trailer"			Dhruva Sarja, Rashmika Mandanna	3:20
6.	"Pogaru Entry BGM"		Gummineni Vijay		2:06

Tamil (Sema Thimiru)

No.	Title	Lyrics	Music	Singer(s)	Length
1.	"Vetti Uttale"	Viveka	Chandan Shetty	Vijay Prakash	3:56
2.	"Karabuu"	Viveka	Chandan Shetty	Chandan Shetty	3:39
3.	"Sema Thimiru Title Track"	Viveka	Chandan Shetty	Ranjith Govind, Chandan Shetty	3:51
4.	"Aalamaraveyil"	Viveka	Gummineni Vijay	Aniruddha Sastry	4:24
5.	"Dialogue Trailer"			Dhruva Sarja, Rashmika Mandanna	3:20
6.	"Sema Thimiru Entry BGM"		Gummineni Vijay		2:06

Telugu (Pogaru)

No.	Title	Lyrics	Music	Singer(s)	Length
1.	"Kundelu Pilla"	Bhaskarabhatla	Chandan Shetty	Vijay Prakash	3:56
2.	"Karabuu"	Bhaskarabhatla	Chandan Shetty	Anurag Kulkarni	3:39
3.	"Pogaru Title Track"	Bhaskarabhatla	Chandan Shetty	Chandan Shetty, Aniruddha Sastry	3:51
4.	"Praanamichinaavu"	Vengi	Gummineni Vijay	Aniruddha Sastry	4:24
5.	"Dialogue Trailer"			Dhruva Sarja, Rashmika Mandanna	3:20
6.	"Pogaru Entry BGM"		Gummineni Vijay		2:06

== Release ==
The film was scheduled to be released on 24 March 2020, but was postponed amid the COVID-19 lockdown in India. It was released on 19 February 2021, in Kannada, along with dubbed versions in Telugu and Tamil(titled Semma Thimiru). It was also dubbed in Hindi by RKD Studios on YouTube on 25 April 2021.

== Reception ==
=== Critical response ===
Y. Maheshwara Reddy of Bangalore Mirror gave 3.5/5 stars and wrote that the film is worth a watch for mass audiences and action-movie buffs. Sunayana Suresh of The Times of India gave 3/5 stars and wrote "Pogaru is definitely a festival for Dhruva Sarja fans, and for those who like mass entertainers in the old-school style. This will be a good visit to the big screen giving you ample space to scream and shout." A. Sharadhaa of The New Indian Express gave 3/5 stars and wrote "Pogaru is a treat for Dhruva's fans, who value his hard work and celebrate his onscreen presence."

=== Box office ===
The film collected ₹45 crore in theatrical run at the box office .
