= Keragodu =

Village in Mandya, Karnataka

Coordinates: 12°38′N 76°55′E

Keregodu ಕೆರೆಗೋಡು
- village
- Interactive map of Keregodu
- Country: India
- State: Karnataka
- District: Mandya
- Talukas: Mandya

Population (2001)
  - Total: 9,619

Languages
  - Official: Kannada
- Time zone: UTC+5:30 (IST)
- Postal code: 571446
- Vehicle registration: kA 11

Keregodu is a village in the southern state of Karnataka, India. It is located in the Mandya taluk of Mandya district in Karnataka. Panchalingeshwara temple is a noted landmark here.

== Demographics ==
As of 2001 India census, Keregodu had a population of 9619 with 4705 males and 4914 females.

=== Noted people ===
- A. P. Arjun - film director

== See also ==
- Mandya
- Districts of Karnataka
