= Saarathi =

2011 film by Dinakar Thoogudeepa

- Theatrical release poster
- Directed by: Dinakar Thoogudeepa
- Screenplay by: Dinakar Thoogudeepa
- Story by: Dinakar Thoogudeepa; Chinthan A. V.
- Produced by: K. V. Satya Prakash
- Starring: Darshan; Deepa Sannidhi; R. Sarathkumar
- Cinematography: K. Krishna Kumar
- Edited by: K. M. Prakash
- Music by: V. Harikrishna
- Production company: Sri Araseshwari Cine Productions
- Distributed by: Reliance Entertainment
- Release date: 30 September 2011
- Running time: 166 minutes
- Country: India
- Language: Kannada
- Budget: ₹7 crore
- Box office: ₹12.50–15 crore

Saarathi (English: Charioteer) is a 2011 Indian Kannada-language action drama film written and directed by Dinakar Thoogudeepa. It stars Darshan and debutante Deepa Sannidhi in the lead roles. V. Harikrishna scored for the film's background and its soundtrack, while the lyrics were penned by V. Nagendra Prasad.

The film released theatrically on 30 September 2011 when Darshan was under judicial custody for domestic violence against his wife, Vijayalakshmi. It received three awards at the 2011 Karnataka State Film Awards, including the Best Entertaining Movie. The core plot of the movie was reported to be based on the 1994 animated movie The Lion King. This was the highest-grossing Kannada movie of 2011.

== Plot ==
Raja is an auto driver, who meets and falls in love with Rukmini. However, Rukmini is taken to her hometown Durgakote, by her relative Pratap, who wants to marry her. Along with his adopted father and friends, Raja follows Rukmini to Durgakote and finds that she hails from the family of palegars (village chieftain) who rule the place. When Raja visits a temple of Durga, the priest of the temple reveals Raja's past.

Past: Raja is actually Krishna, who is the son of Suryanarayana, the chieftain of the village and Rukmini's mother's brother. One day, Krishna falls into a gorge and is chased by a pack of bulls, but Suryanarayana, while trying to save him, falls into the gorge and is killed. With this, Nagappa, Suryanarayana's brother tells Krishna to secretly escape from the village.

Present: Prathap and his father Nagappa also learns about Raja/Krishna's identity from Rukmini, where he kidnaps Raja/Krishna and throws him at the same gorge. Nagappa also reveals that he was the mastermind behind Suryanarayana's death as he wanted to be the village's chieftain and had hired the tribals (who were exiled by Suryanarayana for planning to rob the temple's jewellary) to finish him. Raja/Krishna is chased by the pack of bulls, but is timely saved by the horse, which was gifted by Suryanarayana on his birthday.

Raja/Krishna confronts the tribals and manages to defeat them. Raja/Krishna reaches the Durga temple where he finally exposes Nagappa's involvement in Suryanarayana's death. A fight ensues where Raja/Krishna manages to finish Nagappa and Prathap with the help of the villagers. Raja/Krishna and Rukmini finally get married and Raja/Krishna takes over his father's position as the next chieftain.

== Cast ==
- Darshan as Raja / Krishna
- Deepa Sannidhi as Rukmini
- R. Sarathkumar as Suryanarayana
- Seetha as Raja's mother
- Rangayana Raghu as Raja's adoptive father
- Sharath Lohitashwa as Nagappa, Suryanarayana's brother
- Ajay as Pratap, Nagappa's son
- Bullet Prakash as Raja's friend
- Lohithaswa T.S
- Viswa
- Dileep
- Kote Prabhakar as Pratap's henchman
- Muni as Pratap's henchman
- Lokesh Kademani

== Production ==
Saarathi was initially under the production of Kannada cinema veteran producer KCN Chandrashekhar, but was later taken up by K. V. Satya Prakash as his first film venture. As a result of which, the film had been in production for over 2 years including 90 days for the shooting and later the film release got delayed owing to actor Darshan's arrest by the police following a complaint of domestic violence by his wife Vijayalakshmi. It was filmed at major South Indian tourist places like Chitradurga, Pondicherry, Chalakudy (in Kerala) and Hyderabad, the film ran 100 days in around 17 theaters.

== Soundtrack ==
The music and background score were composed by V. Harikrishna and lyrics were penned by V. Nagendra Prasad.

Saarathi

Soundtrack album by V. Harikrishna
- Released: 19 June 2011
- Recorded: 2011
- Genre: Feature film soundtrack
- Length: 23:01
- Label: Anand Audio

No.	Title	Lyrics	Singer(s)	Length
1.	"Kai Mugidhu Yeru"	V. Nagendra Prasad	Shankar Mahadevan	5:00
2.	"Manase Manase"	V. Nagendra Prasad	Vijay Prakash, Shamita Malnad	4:47
3.	"Vajra Ballalaraya"	V. Nagendra Prasad	Kailash Kher	4:43
4.	"Haago Heege"	V. Nagendra Prasad	Darshan, Vani Harikrishna	4:57
5.	"Kittappa Kittappa"	V. Nagendra Prasad	Shamita Malnad, Shankar Mahadevan	4:54
Total length:				23:01

== Release ==
The film released in 157 theatres across Karnataka on 30 September 2011, including over 30 in the city of Bangalore, and an additional 20 screens were put up due to its commercial success in the opening weekend.

=== Home media ===
The satellite and digital rights were sold to Udaya TV and Sun NXT.

== Reception ==
=== Critical response ===
The Times of India scored the film at 4 out of 5 stars and says "Hats off to Darshan for his fabulous performance, excellent dialogue delivery and body language. Debutant Deepa Sannidhi steals your heart with a lively show. Rangayana Raghu, Sharath Lohithashwa, Sharath Kumar, Ajay have given life to their roles. Music is good with V Harikrishnas catchy tunes and Nagendra Prasads lively lyrics. Cinematography by Krishnakumar is eye-catching. Eshwarikumar needs special mention for his brilliant art work".

Sunayana Suresh from DNA wrote "Cinematography by Krishnakumar is top notch and he's done a great job with the action sequences. Director Dinakar Thoogudeepa has created a film that's well on the lines of big Tollywood entertainers like Magadheera. This film is worth your three hours, go and get entertained". Bangalore Mirror wrote "Overall, it’s a film to enjoy and one of the better entertainers of the year. But only if you manage to remember that whenever Darshan says that he protects the people he loves, it is his character that is talking and not the person. Mind it!".

Shreyas Nag from Deccan Herald wrote "Rangayana Raghu and Bullet Prakash’s timing is just perfect with both of them complementing each other, making the audience laugh their guts off. Though it is a mass entertainer, the songs and the setting of the location puts it on a par with other big banner movies". News 18 wrote "Tamil actor Sharath Kumar makes a dignified presence in the role of Darshan's father. 'Sarathi' is certainly more than a paisa vasool film. Darshan fans will immensely like it".

== Accolades ==
2011 Karnataka State Film Awards

- Best Entertaining Movie
- Best Art Director — Eshwari Kumar
- Special Jury Award (Special effects) — Rajan

1st South Indian International Movie Awards

- Best Film
