= Vani Harikrishna =

Indian singer

- Born: Bangalore, India
- Occupations: Singer, composer
- Years active: 2008–present
- Spouse: V. Harikrishna
- Children: 1

Vani Harikrishna is an Indian film playback singer and music director, who works in South Indian films, primarily in Kannada cinema. She has composed, written and sung several devotional songs before entering into the film playback singing. She won Karnataka State Award for her rendition of "Madhuvana Karedare" song from the film Inthi Ninna Preethiya. Vani debuted as a film composer with the 2013 film Loosegalu.

== Family ==
Vani was born into a family of musicians. Her grandfather, G. K. Venkatesh, was a music composer of Kannada cinema. She is married to V. Harikrishna, a music director and has a son named Aditya.

== Filmography ==
=== As a music director ===
Year	Film	Language	Notes
2013	Loosegalu	Kannada	Debut as a composer
2013	Meenakshi	Kannada	
2015	Ring Road	Kannada	

=== As a singer ===
Year	Film	Song	Music director
2008	Inthi Ninna Preethiya	"Madhuvana Karedare"	Sadhu Kokila
2008	Meghave Meghave	"Hey Neeli Gagana"	V. Harikrishna
2008	Payana	"Jaare"	V. Harikrishna
2009	Maleyali Jotheyali	"Maleyali Jotheyali"	V. Harikrishna
2009	Cheluveye Ninne Nodalu	"Olave Ninne"	V. Harikrishna
2011	Paramathma	"Hesaru Poorthi"	V. Harikrishna
2011	Saarathi	"Haago Heego"	V. Harikrishna
2011	Police Story 3	"Banna Banna"	Sagar S.
2011	Dushta	Jhinke Oh Jhinke	S. Narayan
2012	Addhuri	"Mussanje Veleli"	V. Harikrishna
2012	Shikari	"Kannadiye"	V. Harikrishna
2012	Snehitaru	"Badukodu Hege"	V. Harikrishna
2013	Loosegalu	"Bele Haari"	Vani Harikrishna
2013	Kaddipudi	"Bere Yaro"	V. Harikrishna
2014	Ulidavaru Kandanthe	"Kanna Muchche"	Ajneesh Loknath
2014	Dove	"Heegu Irabahude"	Arjun Janya
2014	Bahaddur	"Neene Neene"	V. Harikrishna
2017	"Hombanna"	"Ambiganirade"	Vinu Manasu

=== As actor ===
Year	Film	Language	Notes
2025	Just Married	Kannada	

== Awards ==
- Won - Karnataka State Film Award for Best Female Playback Singer for the song Madhuvana Karedare from the film Inthi Ninna Preethiya written by Jayanth Kaikini and composed by Sadhu Kokila.
- Won - Suvarna Film Award for Best Female Playback Singer 2011 for the song Haago Heego from the film Saarathi written by Nagendra Prasad and composed by V. Harikrishna.
- Won - Suvarna Film Award for Best Female Playback Singer 2012 for the song Mussanje Veleli from the film Addhuri written by Arjun and composed by V. Harikrishna.
- Won - Mirchi Music Awards South for 'The Best Female Playback Singer 2012' for the song Mussanje Veleli from the film Addhuri written by Arjun and composed by V. Harikrishna.
- Won - South Indian International Movie Awards for Best Female Playback Singer for the song "Mussanje Veleli" from the film Addhuri written by Arjun and composed by V. Harikrishna.
- Nominated -Filmfare Award for Best Female Playback Singer – Kannada for the song Mussanje Veleli from the film Addhuri written by Arjun and composed by V. Harikrishna.
- Won - South Indian International Movie Awards for Best Female Playback Singer for the song "Bere Yaaro" from the film Kaddipudi.
