= V. Harikrishna =

Indian composer (born 1974)

- Born: 5 November 1974 (age 51); Bengaluru, Karnataka, India
- Genres: Film score, Soundtrack, Theatre, World music
- Occupations: Film composer, instrumentalist, music producer, playback singer
- Instruments: Harmonium, Keyboard, Guitar, vocals (playback singing)
- Years active: 1994–present
- Label: "D Beats"
- Spouse: Vani Harikrishna

V. Harikrishna (born 5 November 1974) is an Indian film score and soundtrack composer, playback singer and Producer. He has mainly scored music for Kannada films. Harikrishna made his debut as an independent composer in actor Darshan's first production venture Jothe Jotheyali in 2006. Since then, he has been scoring for majority of Darshan's films besides working for many other leading production houses. He owns an audio company called "D-Beats" established in 2013 and produces music under his own company starting from the film Bulbul (2013). He has turned into a director with the 2019 Kannada film Yajamana.

Harikrishna has won three consecutive Filmfare Award for Best Music for Gaalipata in 2008, Raaj The Showman in 2009 and Jackie in 2010.

== Early life ==
Harikrishna was born in 1974 in Bangalore, in the Karnataka state of India. At the age of eight, he began playing keyboard in an orchestra that his father bought and named after him. He took to playing the keyboard professionally in 1987 and discontinued his studies after matriculation. In his first professional assignment, he worked with composer, Manoranjan Prabhakar. Following his father's death in 1990, Harikrishna took over his mechanic shop, where he worked as a mechanic. In 1994, following composer Sadhu Kokila's insistence, Harikrishna took to music again.

== Career ==
=== Music programming and arranging ===
Harikrishna started out working as an assistant to many leading music directors in 1990's including Hamsalekha, V. Ravichandran, Sadhu Kokila, Gurukiran among others. He has worked as a programmer, an arranger and as a keyboard player for many music directors. He has worked for feature films, short films, daily soaps, ad jingles and private musical albums.

=== Music direction ===
In 2006, Harikrishna was first signed up to compose music for actor Darshan's first home production Jothe Jotheyali. Until this time, Harikrishna was a struggling musician under the protege of actor - director V. Ravichandran. Despite the industry's negative feedback for his move, Darshan went on to sign him as the music director. The film, starring Prem and Ramya in the lead and Darshan in a guest role, was directed by Dinakar Thoogudeepa and had a successful run for about 25 weeks. The film's soundtrack was hugely popular upon release and this immediately silenced the critics. This was immediately followed by the actor's second home production Navagraha. Since then, Harikrishna has been the official composer for most of the Darshan starrer films and productions. Some of the successful collaborations with Darshan include Bhoopathi (2007), Gaja (2008), Porki (2010), Prince (2011), Saarathi (2011) and Chingari (2012) to name a few.

His first collaboration with director - lyricist Yogaraj Bhat for the film Gaalipata (2008) starring Ganesh fetched him his maiden Filmfare award for his successful soundtrack. Another film Payana in the same year saw him belting out soft romantic melodies which was appreciated. The year 2009 proved to be more successful for him with back to back successful soundtracks for the films such as Ambari, Junglee, Raam, Maleyali Jotheyali and Raj, The Showman. While in the former film, he debuted as a playback singer, the latter film fetched him his second Filmfare award for best music direction.

In 2010, Harikrishna composed for 8 feature films and most of them were received very well upon release. Most noteworthy being Jackie which fetched him his third and hat trick Filmfare award and Super directed and enacted by Upendra. The year 2011 saw him composing for over 14 films with many of them turning to be blockbusters and musically well appreciated. Prince, Hudugaru, Vishnuvardhana, Saarathi, Paramathma and Jogayya turned out to be biggest musical blockbusters cementing the top status for him. The success was followed in 2012 with Chingari, Anna Bond, Katariveera Surasundarangi, Addhuri, Jaanu, Drama Yaare Koogadali and Prem Adda receiving enormous positive response both musically and at the box-office. He was also awarded for his singing in Anna Bond by the SIIMA. His fourth Filmfare award was for his second collaboration with Yogaraj Bhat, Drama. Addhuri won him Udaya awards for his music direction.

The successful journey continued further in 2013 with many chartbuster soundtracks for the films such as Topiwala, Bachchan, Bulbul, Kaddipudi, Sakkare and Shravani Subramanya. In 2014, his first musical release Gajakesari evoked mixed response while his scores for films such as Fair & Lovely and Ambareesha was expected to be successful.

=== Film production ===
In 2012, Harikrishna announced his intention in producing films and he started it with the film Jai Bajarangabali starring Ajay Rao and Sindhu Lokanath. He was also reported to be directing the Yogesh starrer Raate. His audio company D-Beats acquired the audio rights of the film Adyaksha in 2014 which had music composed by Arjun Janya.

== Personal life ==
Harikrishna is married to singer and composer Vani Harikrishna, the granddaughter of veteran composer G. K. Venkatesh. They have a son, Aditya, who started as a playback singer with one of Harikrishna's composed films.

== Discography ==
Year	Title	Notes
2006	Jothe Jotheyali	
2007	Bhoopathi	
2007	Snehana Preethina	
2007	Krishna	
2007	Ee Preethi Yeke Bhoomi Melide	Background score only
2008	Gaja	
2008	Gaalipata	Winner Filmfare Award for Best Music Director
2008	Indra	
2008	Arjun	
2008	Payana	
2008	Paramesha Panwala	
2008	Navagraha	
2009	Ambari	
2009	Meghave Meghave	
2009	Junglee	
2009	Rajakumari	
2009	Raj, The Showman	Winner Filmfare Award for Best Music Director; Winner Karnataka State Film Award for Best Music Director; Winner Suwarna Film Award for Best Music Director
2009	Vayuputra	
2009	Abhay	Dubbed in Telugu as Ready For Dhee
2009	Maleyali Jotheyali	
2009	Raam	
2010	Porki	
2010	Hoo	
2010	Cheluveye Ninne Nodalu	
2010	Jackie	Winner Filmfare Award for Best Music Director
2010	Kiccha Huccha	
2010	Eno Onthara	
2010	Super	
2010	Modala Sala	
2010	Chalaki	Telugu film
2011	Boss	
2011	Veera Bahu	
2011	Rama Rama Raghurama	
2011	Prince	
2011	Prema Chandrama	
2011	Dandam Dashagunam	
2011	Dhool	
2011	Hudugaru	
2011	Kool...Sakkath Hot Maga	
2011	Johny Mera Naam Preethi Mera Kaam	
2011	Vinayaka Geleyara Balaga	
2011	Jogayya	
2011	Saarathi	Suvarna Film Award for Best Music Director
2011	Paramathma	
2011	Vishnuvardhana	
2012	Chingari	
2012	Shikari	Kannada-Malayalam bilingual
2012	Anna Bond	Winner SIIMA Award for Best Male Playback Singer
2012	Katariveera Surasundarangi	
2012	Addhuri	Winner Udaya Award for Best Music Director
2012	Snehitaru	
2012	Jaanu	
2012	Manjina Hani	
2012	Mr. 420	
2012	Prem Adda	
2012	Drama	Winner Filmfare Award for Best Music Director
2012	Yaare Koogadali	
2012	Kalpana	
2013	Topiwala	
2013	Bachchan	
2013	Bulbul	Winner SIIMA Award for Best Music Director
2013	Kaddi Pudi	
2013	Brindavana	
2013	Sakkare	
2013	Dyavre	
2013	Shravani Subramanya	
2014	Gajakesari	
2014	Endendu Ninagagi	
2014	Kwatle Satisha	
2014	Bahaddur	
2014	Jai Bajarangabali	Also producer
2014	Fair & Lovely	
2014	Ambareesha	
2014	Mr. and Mrs. Ramachari	Winner, SIIMA Award for Best Music Director
2015	Siddhartha	
2015	Rudra Tandava	
2015	Rhaatee	Also producer
2015	Vaastu Prakaara	
2015	Rana Vikrama	
2015	Endendigu	
2015	Ranna	
2015	Kendasampige	
2015	Mr. Airavata	
2015	Boxer	
2015	Minchagi Nee Baralu	
2015	Masterpiece	
2016	Viraat	
2016	Maduveya Mamatheya Kareyole	
2016	Dana Kayonu	
2016	Shivalinga	
2016	Jaggu Dada	
2016	Mr. and Mrs. Sadachari	Marathi film; Remake of Mr. and Mrs. Ramachari; 2 songs only
2016	Doddmane Hudga	
2016	Santhu Straight Forward	
2016	Naanu Mattu Varalakshmi	
2016	Happy Birthday	
2017	Chowka	One song only
2017	Raajakumara	
2017	Bangara s/o Bangarada Manushya	
2017	Saheba	
2017	Uppina Kagada	
2017	Mugulu Nage	100th Film
2017	Bharjari	
2018	Brihaspathi	
2018	Life Jothe Ondh Selfie	
2019	Kiss	
2019	Missing Boy	
2019	Panchatantra	
2019	Kurukshethra	
2019	Yajamana	As Director & Music Director; Winner Karnataka State Film Award for Best Music Director
2019	Adyaksha in America	
2021	Pogaru	Background Score Only
2021	Roberrt	Background Score Only
2022	James	Background Score Only
2023	Kranti	As director & Music Director
2023	Garadi	
2023	Kaatera	
2024	Karataka Damanaka	
2025	Manada Kadalu	
2025	Burma	
2026	Halka Don	

== Awards ==
- Won 3 consecutive Filmfare Award for Best Music (Gaalipata, Raaj The Showman and Jackie)
- RNJ awards in 2009
- Suvarna Film Awards for Best Music Director (Raaj the Showman, Drama)
- 2012 – Filmfare Award for Drama
- Karnataka State Award for the film Raaj The Showman
- 2012 – Nominated – Best Music Director for Anna Bond
- 2018 – Nominated – Filmfare Award for Best Music Director – Kannada for Raajakumara
- 2017 - Karnataka State Award for Best Music Director - For Raajakumara
- 2019 - Karnataka State Award for Best Music Director - for Yajamana
- 2021- SIIMA Award for Best Music Director for Yajamana
- 2024 – Nominated – Filmfare Award for Best Music Director – Kannada for Kaatera
- 2024 - SIIMA Award for Best Music Director for Kaatera
