= Bahaddur =

- Directed by: Chethan Kumar
- Written by: Chethan Kumar
- Produced by: R. Srinivas
- Starring: Dhruva Sarja; Radhika Pandit
- Narrated by: Puneeth Rajkumar
- Cinematography: Shreesha Kuduvalli
- Edited by: Deepu S. Kumar
- Music by: V. Harikrishna
- Production company: R. S. Productions
- Distributed by: Samarth Ventures
- Release date: 3 October 2014
- Running time: 155 minutes
- Country: India
- Language: Kannada

Bahaddur is a 2014 Indian Kannada-language masala film directed by Chethan Kumar and produced by R. Srinivas under R. S. Productions. The film stars Dhruva Sarja and Radhika Pandit, alongside P. Ravi Shankar, Achyuth Kumar, Jai Jagadish and Srinivasa Murthy. The music was composed by V. Harikrishna, while cinematography and editing were handled by Shreesha Kuduvalli and Deepu. S. Kumar.

Bahaddur was released on 3 October 2014 in 7.1 surround sound, which is the first in Kannada cinema. The 2016 Telugu film Srirastu Subhamastu was reported to have been heavily inspired by the core plot of this film.

== Cast ==
- Dhruva Sarja as Ashok Raj Bahaddur
- Radhika Pandit as Anjali
- Yash as himself
- P. Ravi Shankar as Appaji Gowda, Lakshman Ponnappa's friend
- Srinivasa Murthy as Shankarappa, Anjali's father
- Achyuth Kumar
- Sangeetha
- Jai Jagadish as Lakshman Ponnappa
- Sudha Rani as Doctor
- Vishwanath Mundasad
- Gururaj Hosakote
- Avinash as Krishna Raj Bahaddur
- Padmaja Rao
- Raghava Uday
- Petrol Prasanna
- Jahangir M. S
- Raju Talikote
- Spoorthi Vishwas
- Tanuja
- Nishchitha Gowda
- Anupama Gowda
- Harish Rayappa
- Pavitra Lokesh as Anjali's Mother
- H. G. Dattatreya (credited as Dattanna)
- Puneeth Rajkumar as Narrator

== Plot ==
Set in an urban milieu, the story revolves around Ashok (Dhruva Sarja) who belongs to the Bahaddur royal family. He comes to Mysore in search of an ideal girl and is smitten by the charming Anjali (Radhika Pandit). From teasing her, following her, irritating her, and cajoling her, he tries every trick of the trade to win her heart. However, he doesn't disclose his background. But Anjali has a promise to keep. She's made a commitment to her father, Shankarappa (Srinivasamurthy), that she will marry the boy of his choice. This doesn't deter the lover in Ashok from giving up. In due course of time, Anjali's engagement is fixed with Sharath, the son of Shankarappa's close friend. The story takes a turn when Appaji Gowda (Ravishankar), her father's friend, reveals what's brewing between Ashok and Anjali.

== Production ==
=== Casting ===
The speculations of Radhika Pandit having been signed as the female lead opposite Sarja were confirmed in March 2013. However, Sarja's signing was confirmed in October 2013. Having worked together in Addhuri (2012) previously, the film was their second together. It was revealed in August 2014 that actor Puneeth Rajkumar would be giving a voice-over for the film. Speaking on the importance of this, the director Chethan Kumar said, "The film begins with Puneeth's voice over. He introduces the characters and the story and his voice becomes the sutradhar of the film, as it returns towards the end of the film. What he says also forms an essence of this story that we have tried to narrate".

=== Filming ===
After the film was announced in 2012, the filming got underway, until the producer's Legend International backed out in March 2013, following losses incurred from the failure of its previous production Andhar Bahar. Filming then resumed after R. S. Productions took over in October 2013. Majority of the film was shot in Mysore and Hubli, among other places like Bangalore and Mandya. Two songs for the film were shot in Malaysia. In an interview, Sarja revealed that he had to put on 22 kg for his role in the film and then shed 18 kg for the song sequences.

=== Marketing ===
The trailer of Bahaddur was released on 22 September 2014 on YouTube. As part of the promotional activities, the cast and crew of the film participated in a blood donation camp in Bangalore, organized by fan clubs Dhruva Warriors and Besuge Adda, prior to its 25th-day run in theatres. The cast and crew then promoted the film in various theatres in Bangalore. They further went on a tour of Karnataka, promoting the film, visiting places such as Mandya, Chitradurga, Davangere, Chamrajnagar, and Tumkur.

== Soundtrack ==
Bahaddur

Soundtrack album by V. Harikrishna
- Released: 1 September 2014
- Genre: Feature film soundtrack
- Length: 21:46
- Language: Kannada
- Label: D Beats
- Producer: V. Harikrishna

The music for the film and soundtracks were composed by V. Harikrishna with lyrics penned by Chethan Kumar, Yogaraj Bhat, Kaviraj, and A. P. Arjun. The soundtrack album has five tracks. It was released first on 1 September 2014, under the label D Beats, owned by V. Harikrishna. However, it was released officially on 20 September.

Kannada soundtrack (Bahaddur)
| No. | Title | Lyrics | Singer(s) | Length |
|---|---|---|---|---|
| 1. | "Starade" | Chethan Kumar | V. Harikrishna | 4:23 |
| 2. | "Subbalakshmi" | Chethan Kumar | Santhosh Venky, Apoorva Sridhar | 4:09 |
| 3. | "Hudugeerige" | Yogaraj Bhat | V. Harikrishna | 5:29 |
| 4. | "Neene Neene" | Kaviraj | Sonu Nigam, Vani Harikrishna | 3:36 |
| 5. | "Hutto Surya" | A. P. Arjun | Ranjith, Shashank Sheshagiri, Chandan Shetty | 4:09 |
| Total length: | | | | 21:46 |

Tamil soundtrack (Raj Bahaddur)
| No. | Title | Lyrics | Singer(s) | Length |
|---|---|---|---|---|
| 1. | "Staraga Enaku" | Thamizhan Ilayaa | Samson Silva | 4:23 |
| 2. | "Heartilu Neeyam" | Thamizhan Ilayaa | Aravind Sivam, Gayathri Nair | 4:01 |
| 3. | "Penkalukk Kathal" | Thamizhan Ilayaa | Samson Silva | 5:29 |
| 4. | "Ninaivile" | Thamizhan Ilayaa | Jayadevan, Gayathri Nair | 3:36 |
| 5. | "Veppa Suryan" | Thamizhan Ilayaa | Fahad | 4:09 |
| Total length: | | | | 21:46 |

=== Reception ===
The soundtrack was received positively by critics and fans alike. It sold 1 lakh audio CDs within 18 days of its release, also with 1.5 lakh digital downloads by that time. Following this, the platinum disc was launched in September 2014. Reviewing the album, Sunayana Suresh of The Times of India wrote, "The tracks make for a perfect mix of romance, massy and dance numbers -the must-haves in a commercial entertainer."

== Release and reception ==
The film released on 3 October 2014 in screens across Karnataka. The distribution rights of the film were bought by Samarth Prasad under his banner Samarth Ventures. Following a good response at the domestic box-office, it was announced 24 October, that the film would be screened in 29 centres abroad, that include screens in Australia, the United States, Canada, Germany, the United Arab Emirates, the Netherlands and Singapore.

=== Critical reception ===
Upon its theatrical release, the film received mixed reviews from critics. Shyam Prasad S. of Bangalore Mirror gave the film a rating of four out of five and said, "[the film]... takes the romantic story of boy-meets-girl to the level where the rest of the characters are down to a bare minimum." and gave credit to the "chemistry between the lead pair". G. S. Kumar of The Times of India felt the film has "all the ingredients of the perfect romantic flick". He concluded writing praises for the roles of the acting, music, cinematography and the choreography departments in the film. Bharath Bhat of FilmiBeat gave the film 4 out of 5 stars and wrote, "Bahaddur is a very entertaining movie. The viewers will not have single moment of boredom. A must watch to all cine lovers." However, it received a negative review from S. Viswanath of Deccan Herald who gave the film a 1/5 rating and called the film "sickening". He wrote of the film, "Legitimising stalking, in the guise of comedy, Director Chethan Kumar gives one goosebumps."

=== Box office ===
Following a good opening, reports said Bahaddur collected ₹7.25 crore (US$760,000) in the first week of its release. A bulk of this, ₹3.8 crore (US$400,000) came from the Bangalore, Kolar and Tumkur regions. Following its first week from release, it managed to retain all the screens and collected ₹10 crore (US$1.0 million) within 2 weeks. Unusually, even two weeks after its release, the film was said to be faring well at multiplexes considering the Kannada films were screened in single screens after such a run, previously.
