= Ambareesha =

- Ambareesha theatrical poster
- Directed by: Mahesh Sukhadhare
- Written by: Chinthan
- Produced by: Mahesh Sukhadhare
- Starring: Darshan; Priyamani
- Cinematography: Sathyanarayan
- Edited by: K. M. Prakash
- Music by: V. Harikrishna
- Production company: Sukhadhare Productions
- Release date: 20 November 2014
- Running time: 155 minutes
- Country: India
- Language: Kannada

Ambareesha is a 2014 Indian Kannada-language masala film directed and produced by Mahesh Sukhadhare under the Sri Sukhadhare Pictures banner. The film stars Darshan, Rachita Ram, Priyamani and Dr. Ambareesh. The soundtrack and score were composed by V. Harikrishna and the cinematography was by Ramesh Babu.

== Premise ==
Ambareesha is a labourer who leaves his village and fights against the real estate mafia in Bangalore controlled by RDX and his gang in Malaysia.

== Cast ==
- Darshan as Ambareesha
- Rachita Ram as Karuna
- Priyamani as Smitha
- Kelly Dorji as RDX
- Dr.Ambareesh as Kempegowda
- Tulasi Shivamani
- Ravi Kale
- Saurav Lokesh
- Sharath Lohitashwa
- Sadhu Kokila
- Bullet Prakash

== Production ==
The principal shooting for the film formally began on 7 October 2013.

== Soundtrack ==
The music and background score were composed by V. Harikrishna and lyrics were penned by V. Nagendra Prasad.

Ambareesha

Soundtrack album by V. Harikrishna
- Released: 20 November 2014
- Genre: Feature film soundtrack
- Language: Kannada

All lyrics are written by V. Nagendra Prasad.

Track listing
No.	Title	Singer(s)	Length
1.	"Vaalekkum"	Hemanth
2.	"Kannale"	Sonu Nigam, Shreya Ghoshal
3.	"Gandara Ganda"	S. P. Balasubrahmanyam
4.	"Asaku Pasaku"	Tippu, Lakshmi Vijay
5.	"Poojyaya"	Madhu Balakrishnan
6.	"Khel Khatam"	Naveen Madhav, Sathyan, Santhosh Venky

== Release ==
=== Distribution ===
The distribution rights were sold for ₹21 crore (US$2.2 million).

== Accolades ==
- Filmfare awards south 2015:-
  - "Best Lyricist—Filmfare Award for Best Lyricist – V. Nagendra Prasad–"Kannale"—Won
