= A. P. Arjun =

Indian film director

- Born: 8 August 1984 (age 41); Keragodu, Mandya, Karnataka, India
- Occupations: Film director, screenwriter, lyricist
- Years active: 2006–present
- Spouse: Annapoorna (m. 2020)
- Children: 1

A. P. Arjun is an Indian film director, screenwriter and lyricist. He works in Kannada cinema. He made his debut as a lyricist in the film Thangigagi (2006), he debuted as a director with the 2009 film Ambari. His second film Addhuri (2012) has won multiple awards

== Personal life ==
Arjun married Annapoorna on 10 May 2020 in a simple ceremony with his close relatives. The ceremony was held in the traditional way at Arjun's home. They have a son who was born on 7 May 2021.

== Filmography ==
=== As director ===
Year	Film	Notes
2009	Ambari	Mirchi Music Award for Best Upcoming Lyricist
2010	Sugreeva	Directed by 10 directors
2012	Addhuri	SIIMA Best Director Award; SIIMA Best Lyricist Award; Udaya Film Award for Best Director; Nominated—Filmfare Award for Best Director - Kannada; Suvarna Film Award for Best Director
2015	Rhaatee	
2015	Mr. Airavata	
2019	Kiss	Cameo appearance
2024	Martin	

=== As associate director ===
- Shastri (2005)
- Thangigagi (2006)
- Snehana Preethina (2007)

=== As lyricist ===
- Thangigagi (2006)
- Yuga (2007)
- Ambari (2009)
- Banni (2010)
- Gubbi (2010)
- Swayamvara (2010)
- Sugreeva (2010)
- Addhuri (2012)
- Rajanikantha (2013)
- Varadhanayaka (2013)
- Chandra (2013)
- Andhar Bahar (2013)
- Aantharya (2013)
- Endendu Ninagagi (2014)
- Karodpathi (2014)
- Shuvajinagara (2014)
- Bahaddur (2014)
- Tharagele (2014)
- Fair & Lovely (2014)
- Gajakesari (2014)
- Mr. and Mrs. Ramachari (2014)
- Rhaatee (2015)
- Endendigu (2015)
- Muddu Manase (2015)
