= Santhu Straight Forward =

2016 Indian film by Mahesh Rao

- Theatrical release poster
- Directed by: Mahesh Rao
- Screenplay by: Mahesh Rao
- Dialogues by: Anil Kumar
- Story by: Vijay Chandar
- Based on: Vaalu (2015)
- Produced by: K. Manju
- Starring: Yash; Radhika Pandit
- Cinematography: I. Andrew
- Edited by: K. M. Prakash
- Music by: V. Harikrishna
- Production company: K. Manju Cinemas
- Distributed by: Jayanna Combines; Eros International
- Release date: 28 October 2016 (India)
- Running time: 159 minutes
- Country: India
- Language: Kannada

Santhu Straight Forward is a 2016 Indian Kannada-language action romantic film directed by Mahesh Rao and produced by K. Manju. The film stars Yash and Radhika Pandit in the lead roles, alongside Shaam, Sneha Acharya, Devaraj, Seetha, Anant Nag and Thilak in supporting roles. The music is composed by V. Harikrishna, while cinematography and editing were handled by I. Andrew and K. M. Prakash. The makers had clarified that the film was inspired by the 2015 Tamil film Vaalu as K. Manju had earlier bought the film's remake rights.

Santhu Straight Forward was released on 28 October 2016 and became a commercial success at the box office. The film was dubbed in Hindi and Bengali as Rambo Straight Forward and in Tamil and Malayalam as Sooryavamsi. It was also dubbed in Telugu as Raraju - King Of Kings.

== Plot ==
Santhu, a straight forward guy living a happy life with his loving family, falls in love with Ananya, a B.Arch student. Ananya and Santhu become friends after a series of comical mishaps. However, Santhu soon finds that Ananya is engaged to Deva, a gangster and real estate dealer, due to her dead parent's wish. Ananya, despite in love with Santhu, keeps avoiding him. Deva learns about this and a cat-and-mouse game ensues between Santhu and Deva. During Deva's wedding, Ananya and Deva are kidnapped by Dubai Bhai, a crime boss, as he wants to exact revenge on Deva due to a real estate issue. Santhu arrives and rescues Deva and Ananya, while killing Dubai Bhai in the process. Deva arranges Santhu and Ananya's wedding, where Santhu secretly reveals to Ananya that Dubai Bhai is a fake person and that the guy who played Dubai Bhai is his uncle. Santhu reveals that Ananya's friends and grandfather are also involved in the plan, thus fooling Deva. Santhu and Ananya get married in the presence of their families, friends and Deva.

== Cast ==
- Yash as Santhu
- Radhika Pandit as Ananya
- Shaam as Deva
- Sneha Acharya as Muskhan
- Devaraj as Santhu's father
- Anant Nag as Ananya's grandfather
- Thilak as Syed
- Aishwarya Pisse as Santhu's sister
- Besant Ravi in a special appearance as himself
- Girish Shivanna as Santhu's friend
- Sumithra in a special appearance as herself
- Seetha as Santhu's mother
- Avinash as Ananya's father
- Meghashree Gowda as Ananya's friend
- Veena Sundar in a special appearance as herself
- Charandeep in a special appearance as himself
- P. Ravi Shankar in a guest appearance as Santhu's uncle
- Shobaraj and Neenam Ashwath in a guest appearance in the song "Self Made Shehazada"

== Soundtrack ==
Santhu Straight Forward

Soundtrack album by V. Harikrishna
- Released: 12 October 2016
- Recorded: 2016
- Genre: Feature film soundtrack
- Length: 21:48
- Label: Lahari Music
- Producer: V. Harikrishna

V. Harikrishna has composed for original score and soundtracks of the film.

Track listing
No.	Title	Lyrics	Singer(s)	Length
1.	"Self Made Shehzaada"	Chethan Kumar	Ravisankar, Ranjith, Santhosh Venky, Shashank Sheshagiri	3:55
2.	"Thangaali"	Yogaraj Bhat	Sonu Nigam	4:41
3.	"Anthu Inthu"	Ghouse Peer	Tippu	4:40
4.	"Koodi Itta"	Ghouse Peer	Sonu Nigam, Sunitha Upadrashta	4:30
5.	"Volle Huduga Sikkoune"	Yogaraj Bhat	Tippu	4:02
Total length:				21:48

== Reception ==
=== Critical response ===
Sunayana Suresh of The Times of India wrote "This film is for fans of commercial cinema in its purest form. Of course, it may have a song or fight extra, but that's always a bonus for people who like such cinema. S. Shyam Prasad of Bangalore Mirror wrote "Santhu Straight Forward is the kind of film that makers think consolidates a fan base of a star." A. Sharadhaa of The New Indian Express wrote "The film has a thin plot but it keeps you entertained. It's out-and-out Yash's show that cannot be missed by his fans". Shashiprasad SM of Deccan Chronicle wrote "No doubt that this one is straight from the rocking star to his fan!".
