= Addhuri =

Adhhuri
- Directed by: A. P. Arjun
- Written by: A. P. Arjun
- Produced by: Keerthi Swamy; Shankar Reddy
- Starring: Dhruva Sarja; Radhika Pandit
- Cinematography: Surya S. Kiran (Thoranagatte Shashi Kiran)
- Edited by: Deepu S. Kumar
- Music by: V. Harikrishna
- Release date: 15 June 2012
- Running time: 131 minutes
- Country: India
- Language: Kannada
- Budget: ₹4.5 crores
- Box office: ₹25 crores

Addhuri is a 2012 Kannada romantic drama film directed by A. P. Arjun and starring Dhruva Sarja in his debut film, along with Radhika Pandit in the lead roles with Tarun Chandra in a special appearance. V. Harikrishna is the music director of the film. The film made its theatrical release across Karnataka screens on 15 June 2012. The stunts were handled by Ravi Verma. In one of the scenes Dhruva Sarja jumped from 65 feet height and did all the stunts without duplicates.

== Plot ==
The film opens at a railway station and shows the different kinds of arguments and fights that happen at a railway station. The scene then shifts to a couple standing on a bridge over the tracks. The story soon moves into the lives of the couple who are fighting. Arjun is seen having a heated argument with Poorna. Although it is not made clear as to why they are fighting, it is understood that they are lovers and Arjun is trying to patch up with Poorna. Arjun tries valiantly to patch up with Poorna, who is vehemently denying his every apology and request to reconcile. Their argument soon enters into a situation where Arjun is forced to lie to stop Poorna from abandoning him and leave to Delhi. So, after befriending the ticket master, who helps his cause by giving Poorna a delayed ticket, Arjun feels that he has a chance to win back his love in just six days. Arjun challenges Poorna that he can win her back if she agrees to be with him for these last six days, in which he wants her to accompany her to all the places they had been as lovers before. Poorna reluctantly agrees, and the story now runs on two tracks: showing how close Arjun and Poorna were when they were together and how they are at present.

So, as first four days pass, Arjun endures much scorn and hate from Poorna as he tries to win her heart. He takes on a gang of local goons who taunt her, and bashes them, but that still doesn't melt her heart. One day, Poorna appears at Arjun's house (the scene at this point shows that she might have actually forgiven Arjun) and asks him to buy her a dress and meet her tomorrow as she has a surprise for him. Arjun, who is excited presents Poorna a dress, which she promises to wear when she meets him, and waits for her at the preset location. However, Arjun's heart is torn apart when Poorna introduces her fiancé Tarun further humiliating Arjun. Nevertheless, Arjun takes this insult in his stride and narrates his love story to Tarun, who is unaware that Arjun is actually telling Tarun his own love story he shares with Poorna. Tarun rejoices in the many twists and turns that Arjun endures to win Poorna'a love. It is now revealed that Arjun was nicknamed 'Achhu' and Poorna was nicknamed 'Rachhu' and they referred to themselves using the same names from the time they fell in love. Tarun is impressed with Arjun and promises any help he can offer for Arjun to reclaim his love and leaves.

Although it is not revealed till the later part of the movie as to what caused the rift in their relationship, it soon becomes apparent that Poorna is upset with Arjun because he betrayed her when she trusted him the most. Dejected, she decided to end her relationship with Arjun and leave him for good. With five days having passed, Arjun begins to feel that his love is slipping away from him forever and bears his heart to Poorna, who has now has learnt that Arjun had no intention to betray her, and it was all her haste that has led to her breakup with Arjun. Disappointed with herself for humiliating the man she loves, she decides to leave the relationship anyway, as she fears that going back to Arjun now may cause him to doubt her feelings for him. However, on the seventh and final day, when the viewer suspects their relationship is soon to end, in a twist of fate, Arjun and Poorna miraculously unite and lead a happy life ever after.

== Cast ==
- Dhruva Sarja as Arjun
- Radhika Pandit as Poorna
- Tarun Chandra as Tarun (special appearance)
- Nagathihalli Chandrashekhar as College lecturer
- Bullet Prakash as Bus ticket collector
- Raju Talikote as College watchman
- Tabla Nani as Train ticket seller
- Sathish Ninasam as Auto driver
- Anushri as Asha

== Production ==
Aesthetic sense was required for this romantic drama. Two stop push, bleach bypass technique has been adopted for Adduri cave scenes. Fourth color layer ignition technique has been adopted for the entire movie. Bleach bypass technique which is an optical technique is very rarely used for the entire movie in the world of cinema. This is the first time in India that an entire movie has been produced using this technique. The technique was adopted from the movie "Dildaara". All the images appear very natural and in very nice contrasting colors.

== Soundtrack ==
Addhuri

Soundtrack album by V. Harikrishna
- Released: 4 June 2012
- Recorded: 2012
- Genre: Feature film soundtrack
- Length: 23:33
- Language: Kannada
- Producer: V. Harikrishna

Official audio
- Addhuri - Full Album on YouTube

V. Harikrishna has composed six songs. All the songs' lyrics are written by A. P. Arjun. The soundtrack was distributed by Anand Audio. Darshan, Kichcha Sudeep, Premkumar, Ajay Rao, director Prem (Kiran), Mahesh Babu, V. Harikrishna, Chiranjeevi Sarja, Hamsalekha, Indrajith Lankesh made it to the audio release evening with Chancery Pavilion Bhasker Raju, producer CMR Shanker Reddy, Shankre Gowda, Yogish son of Dwarakish were also present for the audio release.

Track listing
| No. | Title | Singer(s) | Length |
|---|---|---|---|
| 1. | "Cinderalla" | Chetan Sosca | 4:22 |
| 2. | "Thu Antha" | V. Harikrishna | 4:26 |
| 3. | "ABCD" | Ranjith, V. Harikrishna | 4:14 |
| 4. | "Mussanje Veleli" | Vani Harikrishna | 5:28 |
| 5. | "Ah Ammate" | V. Harikrishna | 5:03 |
| Total length: | | | 23:33 |

== Reception ==
=== Critical response ===
A critic from The Times of India scored the film at 3.5 out of 5 stars and says "Radhika Pandith has given life to the role with a neat performance. Tarun Chandra is graceful. Anushri has done a good job too. Music by V Harikrishna has some extraordinary tunes and cinematography by Surya is marvellous". B S Srivani from Deccan Herald wrote "Very few characters populate the story but there is drama enough, tension enough. Addhuri scores over similar love stories with the director’s treatment". Srikanth Srinivasa from Rediff.com scored the film at 3 out of 5 stars and says "Adhoori (which means richness) lives up to its name. It keeps the viewer engaged, which is a refreshing change from the many bad Kannada films hitting the screens in the past few weeks". A critic from Bangalore Mirror wrote "Dhruva will take a while getting used to, but is here to stay. Radhika Pandit delivers another good performance. And there is hardly any other actor with a quorum of scenes to write about. Addhuri is not exactly a treat, but does carry enough entertainment warranting a watch". A critic from News18 India wrote "Tarun's inclusion in the film was a well-kept secret, but the actor has really made an impact through his role. "Addhuri" is a film that's good-looking, fun and topped with emotions".

=== Box office ===
The film, made on an estimated budget of ₹4.5 crore, reportedly collected ₹25 crore at the box office.

== Awards ==
2nd South Indian International Movie Awards

- Best Director -A. P. Arjun
- Best Cinematographer - Surya S Kirana
- Best Lyricist - A. P. Arjun for "Ammate"
- Best Female Playback Singer - Vani Harikrishna for "Mussanje Veleli"
- Best Male Debutant - Dhruva Sarja
- Nominated—Best Film
- Nominated—Best Actress - Radhika Pandit
- Nominated—Best Dance Choreographer - Harsha for "Ah Ammate"

Udaya Film Awards

The film won a major haul at the 2013 Udaya Film awards grabbing the award in 4 following categories:

- A. P. Arjun - Best Director
- Radhika Pandit - Best Actress
- Dhruva Sarja - Best Debutant - Male
- V. Harikrishna - Best Music Director
