= Anand Audio =

Record label based in India

- Trade name: Anand Audio Music
- Company type: Private
- Industry: Entertainment
- Founded: 25 March 1999; 27 years ago in Karnataka, India
- Founder: Mohan Chabria
- Headquarters: Bangalore, India
- Products: CDs
- Services: Music record label

YouTube information
- Channel: Anand Audio
- Years active: 2011-present
- Genres: Music videos; Film trailers
- Subscribers: 13.7 million
- Views: 11.03 billion
- Last updated: 26 June 2025
- Website: anandaudio.com

Anand Audio is an Indian music record label company in Karnataka. It is primarily known for publishing and marketing Sandalwood cinema sound tracks.

== History ==
Anand Audio was founded on 25 March 1999 by late Mohan Chabria.

== List of artists ==
- Anuradha Bhat
- B. R. Chaya
- Chaitra H. G.
- Chinmayi
- Indu Nagaraj
- K. S. Chithra
- Priyadarshini
- Priya Himesh
- Arjun Janya

== Production filmography ==
Key
†	Denotes films that have not yet been released

Year	Film	Music director	Notes
2000	Yajamana	Rajesh Ramanath	
2006	Jothe Jotheyali	V. Harikrishna	
2010	Jackie	V. Harikrishna	
2011	Kempe Gowda	Arjun Janya	
2015	Vajrakaya	Arjun Janya	
2018	Seizer	Chandan Shetty	
2019	99	Arjun Janya	
2021	Pogaru	Chandan Shetty	
2021	Roberrt	Arjun Janya	

== YouTube presence ==
Anand Audio joined YouTube on 10 August 2011, and has around 8.92 million subscribers on end of February 2021.
