= List of Kannada films of 2012 =

A list of Kannada-language films produced in the Kannada film industry in India in 2012.

This year marked a spike in profits with the biggest numbers raking in for the historical multistarrer Krantiveera Sangolli Rayanna and the highest footfalls for Pooja Gandhi's Dandupalya that also became the highest grossing female-led movie till date.

Rambo, Sidlingu, Kalpana, Govindaya Namaha, Chingari, Adhoori and Drama were some of the successful movies of this year.

Radhika Pandit and Yash had a decent year with 2 hits, Drama in common, along with Adhoori and Lucky respectively.

== Box office collection ==
The highest-grossing Kannada films released in 2012, by worldwide box office gross revenue, are as follows.

The rank of the films in the following depends on the worldwide gross. The budget is only for knowledgeable purpose.

The highest worldwide gross of 2012
Rank	Title	Production company	Worldwide gross	References
1	Krantiveera Sangolli Rayanna	Sri Sangolli Rayanna films	₹40 crore (US$4.2 million)	
2	Dandupalya	Apple Blossom Creations	₹25 crore (US$2.6 million)	
3	Addhuri	CMR Productions	₹25 crore (US$2.6 million)	
4	Katari Veera Surasundarangi	Rockline Productions	₹16 crore (US$1.7 million)	
5	Drama	Jayanna Combines	₹13 crore (US$1.3 million)	
6	Anna Bond	Poornima Enterprises	₹12 crore (US$1.2 million)	
7	Chingari	Mahashaila Cine Sankula	₹12 crore (US$1.2 million)	
8	Govindaya Namaha	Suresh Arts	₹8 crore (US$830,000)	
9	Rambo	Laddoo Cinema House	₹5 crore (US$520,000)	
10	Jaanu	Jayanna Combines	₹2 crore (US$210,000)	

== Released films ==
=== January–June ===
Opening		Title	Director	Cast	Genre	Notes
J A N	6th	Shakti	Anil Kumar	Malashri, Ashish Vidyarthi, P. Ravi Shankar, Shayaji Shinde, Vinaya Prasad	Action	Produced by Ramu Enterprises
J A N	6th	Prarthane	K. Sadashiva Shenoy	Ananth Nag, Prakash Raj, Sudha Murty, B. C. Patil, Master Manoj, Master Sachin	Drama	Last film of the acclaimed cinematographer S. Ramachandra
J A N	6th	Rana Pratap	G. K. Mudduraj	Thriller Manju, Priyadarshini Bopaiah	Action	
J A N	13th	Sidlingu	Vijaya Prasad	Yogesh, Ramya, Suman Ranganathan	Drama	Produced by Samy Associates
J A N	13th	Ko Ko	R. Chandru	Srinagar Kitty, Priyamani, Srihari, Anu Prabhakar, Sadhu Kokila, Rangayana Raghu	Comedy, Drama	Produced by Bharani Minerals
J A N	20th	Tsunami	Makham Manohar	Raju Patil, Soniya, Rangayana Raghu, Tennis Krishna, Doddanna	Action	
J A N	27th	Arakshaka	P. Vasu	Upendra, Ragini Dwivedi, Sadha, Seetha	Action- Thriller	Inspired by Hollywood film Shutter Island. Produced by Udaya Ravi Films
F E B	3rd	Chingari	Harsha	Darshan, Deepika Kamaiah, Bhavana, Rangayana Raghu	Romance-Action	Inspired by Hollywood film Taken. Released by Samarth Ventures. 100 days complete
F E B	10th	Parijatha	Srinivas Prabhu	Diganth, Aindrita Ray, Mukhyamantri Chandru	Romance	Remake of Tamil film Boss Engira Bhaskaran. Produced by P2 Productions
F E B	10th	AK 56	Om Prakash Rao	Siddhanth, Sherin, Sumalatha, Atul Kulkarni	Action	Produced by Silver Screen Pictures
F E B	10th	Tuglak	Aravind Kaushik	Rakshit Shetty, Balu Nagendra, Rishab Shetty, Meghana Gaonkar, Bank Janardhan	Romance	Produced by White Ayre Entertainment
F E B	17th	Nammanna Don	Ramesh Aravind	Ramesh Aravind, Mona Parvaresh, Sanathini	Comedy	Produced by Ravi Joshi, Luv Kush Productions
F E B	17th	Gavipura	Kumar	Suraj Sasnur, Soujanya, Tennis Krishna	Drama	Produced by Virat Enterprises
F E B	24th	Lucky	Dr. Soori	Yash, Ramya	Romance	Produced by Radhika Kumaraswamy
F E B	24th	Saniha	Mahesh Chinmayi	Abhay, Divya Sridhar, Bimbica, Shobaraj	Romance	
M A R	2nd	Munjane	S. Narayan	Ganesh, Manjari Phadnis, Malavika Avinash, S. Narayan	Romance	Produced by Bhagyavathi Combines
M A R	2nd	Sankranthi	Mahesh Babu	Gururaj Jaggesh, Roopashree, Skanda Ashok	Drama	
M A R	2nd	Puneet	Neel Kamal	Dileep Pai, Nisha Shetty, Neethu	Romance	Produced by Creative Mind Productions
M A R	9th	Alemari	Mahesh Kumar	Yogesh, Radhika Pandit, Ramesh Bhat, Rangayana Raghu, Umashri	Romance	Produced by Gajendra.
M A R	9th	Bhagavantha Kai Kotta	M. S. Umesh	Ravishankar Gowda, Madhuri, Roopashree, Tennis Krishna	Comedy	Produced by Sankeshwar Combines.
M A R	16th	Magadi	Suresh Goswami	Deepak, Rakshita	Crime, Romance	
M A R	23rd	Narasimha	Mohan Shankar	V. Ravichandran, Nikesha Patel, Sanjjana	Action, Drama	Remake of Telugu film Simmarasi
M A R	23rd	Prasad	Manoj Sathi	Arjun Sarja, Madhuri Bhattacharya, Sankalp	Family drama	Produced by AKK Entertainment Films
M A R	23rd	Silence	Venugopal	Thriller Manju, Surekha Pallavi, Kumar	Suspense thriller	
M A R	23rd	Aa Marma	Madhusudhan	Saikumar, Jackie Shroff, Rami Reddy, Thriller Manju, Satyaprakash	Suspense thriller	Produced by Nagarjuna Cine Creations
M A R	30th	Govindaya Namaha	Pawan Wadeyar	Komal Kumar, Parul Yadav, Madhulika Sharma, Anna Georgia, Rekha Vedavyas	Comedy, Drama	Produced by Suresh Arts
M A R	30th	Shikari	Abhaya Simha	Mammootty, Poonam Bajwa, Auditya	Action	Produced by K. Manju Films
A P R
A P R	6th	Bheema Theeradalli	Om Prakash Rao	Duniya Vijay, Pranitha, Umashree	Action, Drama	Presented by Sammarth Ventures
A P R	6th	Dev Son of Mudde Gowda	Indrajith Lankesh	Diganth, Charmee Kaur, Ananth Nag	Romance	Produced by Jade Plants
A P R	6th	Lady Boss	Sharan	Ayesha, Thriller Manju	Action	
A P R	13th	Dashamukha	Ravi Srivatsa	V. Ravichandran, Ananth Nag, Devaraj, Saritha, Chetan Kumar, Avinash	Action	Based on Hollywood film 12 Angry Men
A P R	20th	Toofan	Smile Seenu	Yashas, Nakshatra, Chandan	Romance	
A P R	27th	Parie	Sudhir Attavar	Rakesh Adiga, Smitha, Usha Uthup, Harshika Poonacha, Naga Kiran	Romance	Premiered at Bollywood on 15 April
M A Y
M A Y	1st	Anna Bond	Duniya Soori	Puneeth Rajkumar, Priyamani, Nidhi Subbaiah, Ananth Nag, Jackie Shroff	Action	Produced by Poornima Enterprises
M A Y	10th	Katari Veera Surasundarangi (3D)	Suresh Krishna	Upendra, Ambareesh, Ramya, Doddanna	Romantic fantasy	Produced by Vrushabhadri Productions
M A Y	18th	Breaking News	Nagathihalli Chandrashekar	Ajay Rao, Radhika Pandit, Ananth Nag, Rangayana Raghu	Satirical comedy	Produced by Nagathihalli Cine Creations
M A Y	18th	Kiladi Kitty	R. Anantha Raju	Srinagar Kitty, Hariprriya, Nivedhitha	Comedy	Remake of Telugu film Blade Babji; Produced by Sangam Films
M A Y	18th	Gandhi Smiles	Raghavendra Kamath	C. R. Simha, Umashri, Pavitra Lokesh, Suchendra Prasad, Mukhyamantri Chandru	Drama	
M A Y	25th	Villain	M. S. Ramesh	Auditya, Ragini Dwivedi, Avinash, Rangayana Raghu	Action	Produced by Saraswathi Entertainers
J U N
J U N	1st	Jaanu	Preetham Gubbi	Yash, Deepa Sannidhi, Rangayana Raghu	Romance/ Action	Produced by Jayanna Combines
J U N	8th	Crazy Loka	Kavita Lankesh	V. Ravichandran, Daisy Bopanna, Harshika Poonacha, Bharathi Vishnuvardhan	Romance	Produced by Confident Group
J U N	8th	Bhagirathi	Baraguru Ramachandrappa	Tara, Bhavana, Kishore, Shivadwaj, Srinath	Drama	Based on the novel "Kerege Haara"
J U N	8th	Rana	Srinivasa Murthy	Pankaj Narayan, Ambareesh, Supritha, Spoorthi, Archana, Sonia Gowda	Action	Produced by Shivananda Madashetty
J U N	8th	Devanahalli	Pallakki Radhakrishna	Rahul, Shravani, Sriraghav, Jagadish, Uday, Sugriv, Vali Vidyarthi	Drama	
J U N	15th	Addhuri	A. P. Arjun	Dhruv Sarja, Radhika Pandit	Romance	Produced by CMR Productions
J U N	15th	Indina Satya	Aditya Chikkanna	Bharath, Sudharani	Action	
J U N	22nd	Paper Dhoni	R. K. Nayak	Naveen Krishna, Shanthala, Vinaya Prasad, Avinash	Drama	Produced by Raja Rajeshwari Creators
J U N	22nd	Nagavalli	Kumar	Madhu Shalini, Karthik, Venu, Thriller Manju	Horror/ Thriller	Produced by Keshava and Narasimha
J U N	29th	Dandupalya	Srinivasa Raju	Raghu Mukherjee, Pooja Gandhi, Priyanka Kothari, Sudharani, Makarand Deshpande, Bhavya	Crime drama	Produced by Apple Blossom Creations
J U N	29th	Hai Krishna	Roy Kollegala	Krishna Supriya, Shruti Raj, Vijayalakshmi, Shankar Narayan	Romance	Produced by SK Productions

=== July–December ===
Opening		Title	Director	Cast	Genre	Notes
J U L	6th	Romeo	P. C. Shekar	Ganesh, Bhavana (Malayalam actress), Avinash	Romance	Produced by KS Pictures
J U L	6th	Naagavalli	Kumar	Thriller Manju, Madhushalini, Karthik, Kashinath, Venu, Daksha Mahendru, Spoorvi, Sanketh Kashi	Horror Drama	
J U L	6th	Modala Minchu	Wesley Brown	Hemanth, Supritha, Doddanna, Sadhu Kokila	Romance	
J U L	6th	Sri Kshetra Adi Chunchanagiri	Om Sai Prakash	Ambareesh, Sriimurali, Ramkumar, Shivakumar	Devotional	
J U L	13th	Preethiya Loka	Nandan Prabhu	Vinay, Archana, Ramesh Bhat, Nandan Prabhu	Romance/Drama	Produced by Ramakrishna Enterprisers
J U L	13th	Aravinda	TPR Thimmaraju	Aravindraj, Aishwarya, Santhosh Kumar, Military Manju	Drama	Produced by Benaka Movies
J U L	20th	O Preethiye	Sangamesh	Ashwin Raj, Padmini	Romance	
J U L	27th	Godfather	Sethu Sriram	Upendra, Soundarya Jayamala, Catherine Tresa	Drama	Produced by K. Manju Films
J U L	27th	Gowri Putra	Manju M. Maskalmatti	Akshay, Nikita Thukral, Nivedhitha, Roopika, Nagashekar	Romance	
A U G	3rd	18th Cross	Shankar	Deepak, Radhika Pandit, Vinaya Prasad, Jeeva, Ramakrishna	Action/Drama	
A U G	10th	Sagar	M. D. Sridhar	Prajwal Devaraj, Radhika Pandit, Sanjjana, Hariprriya	Romance/ Drama	Remake of Telugu film Chukkallo Chandrudu. Produced by Ramu Enterprises
A U G	10th	12AM Madhyarathri	Karthik	Abhimanyu, Divya Sridhar	Horror	
A U G	17th	Challenge	Ganesh Kamarajan	Dileep Raj, Harish Raj, Kalabhavan Mani, Achyuth Kumar, Sanjana Singh	Action thriller	Produced by Arubere Art Pvt Ltd.
A U G	24th	Shiva	Om Prakash Rao	Shiva Rajkumar, Ragini Dwivedi, Rangayana Raghu	Action	
A U G	31st	Naavika	Sen Prakash	Shravanth, Manish Chandra, Swathi Jannath, Tennis Krishna, Shobaraj	Action drama	Produced by Binoculars Organisation
S E P	7th	Rambo	M. S. Sreenath	Sharan, Madhuri, Deepika, Shruti, Umashree, Tabla Nani	Comedy	Produced by Atlanta Nagendra and Sharan
S E P	14th	Manjunatha BA LLB	Mohan Shankar	Jaggesh, Reema Vohra, Karibasavaiah, Girija Lokesh	Comedy	Remake of Malayalam film Hello; Produced by Gowramma Productions
S E P	14th	Jaihind	Venugopal	Sandesh, Pooja Gandhi, Ramesh Bhat, Thriller Manju	Drama	Produced by Om Sai Productions
S E P	21st	Chaarulatha	Pon Kumaran	Priyamani, Skanda Ashok, P. Ravi Shankar, Master Manjunath	Horror / Thriller	Produced by Dwarakish Chitra; Inspired by Thai film Alone; Simultaneously released in Tamil, Telugu and Malayalam
S E P	21st	Cyber Yugadol Nava Yuva Madhura Prema Kavyam	Madhuchandra	Gurunandan, Shwetha Srivatsav, Sharath Lohitashwa	Romance	Produced by Ashwini Creations
S E P	28th	Kalpana	Rama Narayanan	Upendra, Saikumar, Lakshmi Rai, Shruti, Umashri	Horror/Comedy	Produced by Thenandal Films; Remake of Tamil film Kanchana
S E P	28th	Sidda Ganga	G. Murthy	Thanmayi, Master Manoj, Shivakumara Swamiji, Ravi Chetan, Ramesh Bhat, Bank Janardhan	Social drama	Produced by Chiguru Samsthe
O C T	5th	Ondu Kshanadalli	Dinesh Babu	Tarun Chandra, Sanjjana, Bhama	Romance	Produced by Jai Jagadish and Vijayalakshmi Singh
O C T	5th	Snehitaru	Rama Narayanan	Vijay Raghavendra, Tarun Chandra, Pranitha, Srujan Lokesh, Darshan, Duniya Vijay, Ravishankar Gowda, Nikita Thukral	Drama	Produced by Soundarya Jagadish
O C T	12th	Kalaya Tasmai Namaha	Chandrashekar Shrivastav	Yogesh, Madhubala	Crime drama	Produced by Maruthi Enterprises
O C T	19th	Gokula Krishna	B. M. Jayakannan	Prajwal Devaraj, Ananya, Bhavya, Doddanna	Romantic comedy	Produced by Channigaraya Combines
O C T	19th	Mr. 420	Pradeep Raj	Ganesh, Pranitha, Rangayana Raghu, Sadhu Kokila	Comedy	Produced by Sandesh Combines
O C T	26th	Samsaaradalli Golmaal	Om Sai Prakash	Mohan, Anu Prabhakar, Tara, Umashree, Sadhu Kokila, Sihi Kahi Chandru	Family drama	Remake of Telugu film Aadivaram Adavallaku Selavu
O C T	26th	Ball Pen	Shashikanth	Srinagar Kitty, Skanda, Samarth, Vishal, Bhumika, Chetana, Suchendra Prasad	Children's film	Produced by Mahanadhi Creations
N O V	1st	Krantiveera Sangolli Rayanna	Naganna	Darshan, Nikita Thukral, Shashikumar, Jayapradha, Umashree, Ramesh Bhat	Epic/ War	Produced by Sri Sangolli Rayanna Films
N O V	1st	Dakota Picture	Om Prakash Rao	Rockline Venkatesh, Nikesha Patel, Om Prakash Rao, Doddanna, Mukhyamantri Chandru, Shashikumar, Bank Janardhan, Sneha	Comedy	Remake of Hindi film Malamaal Weekly; Produced by Rockline Productions
N O V	9th	Super Shastri	Raviraj	Prajwal Devaraj, Haripriya, Rangayana Raghu, Umashree	Romantic comedy	Remake of Telugu film Seema Sastri; Produced by G. R. Gold films
N O V	9th	Kamsale Kaisale	T. S. Nagabharana	Master Snehith, Master Vasuki Vaibhav, Sridhar, T. S. Nagabharana, Shanthamma, Baby Amulya	Children's film	
N O V	16th	Guru	Jaggesh	Gururaj Jaggesh, Rashmi Gautham, Sudharani, Srinivasa Murthy, Yathiraj	Thriller - Action	Remake of Tamil film Mouna Guru; Produced by Sri Gururaja Movies
N O V	23rd	Drama	Yogaraj Bhat	Yash, Radhika Pandit, Sindhu Lokanath, Sampath Raj, Sathish Ninasam	Romantic comedy	Produced by Yogaraj Movies
N O V	23rd	Edegarike	Sumana Kittur	Auditya, Atul Kulkarni, Akanksha	Action	Produced by Megha Movies.
N O V	23rd	See You	Durga Prasad	Vybhav, Aparna, Vijayalakshmi	Romance	
N O V	30th	Olavina Ole	Teshi Venkatesh	Santhosh, Neha Patil, Shankar Ashwath	Drama	
N O V	30th	Hosa Prema Purana	Shivakumar	Nitin Gowda, Shraddha Das, Radhika Gandhi, Pooja Gandhi	Romance	Produced by Swamy Family Productions and Gajanana Arts
N O V	30th	Sri Chowdeshwari Devi Mahime	Ma. Ramanna	Roja, Shobaraj	Mythological	Produced by Saroja Ramanna
D E C	7th	Prem Adda	Mahesh Babu	Prem, Kriti Kharbanda, Murali Krishna	Action drama	Remake of Tamil film Subramaniapuram; Produced by Meka Films
D E C	20th	Yaare Koogadali	Samuthirakani	Puneeth Rajkumar, Bhavana (Malayalam actress), Yogesh, Sindhu Lokanath, Girish Karnad, Sadhu Kokila	Drama	Remake of Tamil film Poraali; Produced by Poornima Enterprises
D E C	28th	Nandeesha	Om Sai Prakash	Komal Kumar, Parul Yadav, Malavika Wales, Srinivasa Murthy, Ramesh Bhat	Comedy	Remake of Malayalam film Thilakkam; Produced by Soundarya Lahari Creations

== Notable deaths ==
Month	Date	Name	Age	Profession	Notable films
January	5	CVL Shastry	82	Producer	Malaya Marutha, Malgudi Days, Kittu Puttu, Aathanka
February	3	Kari Basavaiah	53	Actor	Undu Hoda Kondu Hoda, Baa Nalle Madhuchandrake, Yaarige Saluthe Sambala, Nooru Janmaku
June	8	K. S. R. Das	75	Director	Kalla Kulla, Sahodarara Savaal, Snehithara Savaal, Chinnadhantha Maga, Khaidi, Thirugu Baana
September	13	Rajesh Gundurao	41	Actor, Producer	Hoovu Hannu, Samara
October	4	K.C.N. Gowda	84	Producer, Exhibitor, Financier and Distributor	Bhale Jodi, Bangarada Manushya, Sharapanjara, Kasturi Nivasa, Kaviratna Kalidasa, Babruvahana, Satya Harischandra
November	10	Mynavathi	77	Actress	Abbaa Aa Hudugi, Bhakta Vijaya, Rayara Sose, Hari Bhakta, Anuradha, Amma, Muthaide Bhagya
