= Suvarna Film Awards =

Film and television awards for Kannada films

- Awarded for: Excellence in cinematic achievements for Kannada cinema
- Country: India
- Presented by: Star Suvarna Channel
- First award: 2008 - 2013
- Website: suvarnafilmawards.tv suvarnafilmawards.com

Television/radio coverage
- Network: Star Suvarna

The Suvarna Film Awards is an award ceremony for Kannada films presented annually by Star Suvarna Channel, a Kannada-language division of the STAR India, from the south-Indian state of Karnataka. The awards ceremony has been instituted to honour both artistic and technical excellence in the Kannada language film industry. Held since 2008, the awards' sponsors have been made by Ujala and Confident Group.

== History and format ==
The Journey of Suvarna Film Awards had started in the year 2008, in order to appreciate & felicitate the Kannada Film Industry. This is the most prestigious Award given to Kannada Film Fraternities as a token of gratitude to their spectacular and outstanding contribution in the Film Industry.

It has 29 different categories of Awards of which every category of award pertains to their work, on par with excellence in various aspects of Film-making. The selection of nominees is divided into two categories which is Best & Favorite category.

The Best Category nominees are selected by a set of jury members and the Favorite category nominees are selected through the system of voting from all over Karnataka.

== Jury Awards ==
=== Best Actor ===
The list of winners in Suvarna Film Award for Best Male Actor category.

Year	Actor	Film
2013	Darshan	Krantiveera Sangolli Rayanna
2012	Sudeep	Vishnuvardhana
2011	Puneeth Rajkumar	Jackie
2010	Jaggesh	Eddelu Manjunatha
2008	Puneeth Rajkumar	Milana

=== Best Actress ===
The list of winners in Suvarna Film Award for Best Female Actor category.

Year	Actor	Film
2013	Priyamani; Pooja Gandhi	Chaarulatha; Dandupalya
2012	Ramya	Sanju Weds Geetha
2011	Radhika Pandit	Krishnan Love Story
2010	Aindrita Ray	Manasaare
2008	Pooja Gandhi	Krishna

=== Best Director ===
The list of winners in Suvarna Film Award for Best Director category.

Year	Winner	Film
2013	A. P. Arjun	Addhuri
2012	Nagashekar	Sanju Weds Geetha
2011	Shashank	Krishnan Love Story
2010	Shivamani	Joshh
2008	Duniya Soori	Duniya

=== Best Film ===
The list of winners in Suvarna Film Award for Best Film category.

Year	Film	Producer
2013	Krantiveera Sangolli Rayanna	Anand Appugol (producer); Naganna (director)
2012	Hudugaru	Poornima Enterprises
2011	Jackie	Poornima Enterprises
2010	Joshh	S. V. Babu
2008	Milana

=== Best Debut Actor ===
The list of winners in Suvarna Film Award for Best Debut Male Actor category.

Year	Actor	Film
2013	Dhruva Sarja	Addhuri
2012	Srikanth	Olave Mandara
2011	Sathya	Gundrugoovi
2010	Rakesh Adiga	Jhossh
2008	Prajwal Devaraj	Sixer

=== Best Debut Actress ===
The list of winners in Suvarna Film Award for Best Debut Female Actor category.

Year	Actor	Film
2013	Soundarya Jayamala	Godfather
2012	Deepa Sannidhi	Saarathi
2011	Meghana Raj	Punda
2010	Ragini Dwivedi	Veera Madakari
2008	Rashmi	Duniya

=== Best Supporting Actor ===
The list of winners in Suvarna Film Award for Best Supporting Actor category.

Year	Actor	Film
2013	Tabla Nani	Rambo
2012	Yogesh	Hudugaru
2011	Rangayana Raghu	Modala Sala
2010	Tabla Nani	Eddelu Manjunatha
2008	Rangayana Raghu	Duniya

=== Best Supporting Actress ===
The list of winners in Suvarna Film Award for Best Supporting Actress category.

Year	Actor	Film
2013	Umashree	Bheema Theeradalli
2012	Aindrita Ray	Paramathma
2011	Harshika Poonachha	Jackie
2010	Sumithra	Gokula
2008	Tara	Sri Kaivara Mahatme

=== Best Actor in Negative Role ===
The list of winners in Suvarna Film Award for Best Actor in Negative Role category.

Year	Winner	Film
2013	Rakesh Adiga	Alemari
2012
2011
2010
2008

=== Best Actor in Comedy Role ===
The list of winners in Suvarna Film Award for Best Actor in a Comedy Role category.

Year	Actor	Film
2013	Sadhu Kokila	Snehitaru
2012
2011	Raju Thalikote	Pancharangi
2010	Raju Thalikote	Manasaare
2008	Ramesh Aravind	Satyavan Savitri

=== Best Music Director ===
The list of winners in Suvarna Film Award for Best Music Director category.

Year	Winner	Film
2013	V. Harikrishna	Drama
2012	Jassie Gift	Sanju Weds Geetha
2011	V. Harikrishna	Jackie
2010	V. Harikrishna	Raaj
2008	Mano Murthy	Milana

=== Best Lyricist ===
The list of winners in Suvarna Film Award for Best Lyricist category.

Year	Winner	Song	Film
2013	Kaviraj	"Aalochane Aalaapane"	Romeo
2012
2011	Raghavendra Kamath	"Munjaane Manjalli"	Just Maath Maathalli
2010
2008

=== Best Male Playback Singer ===
The list of winners in Suvarna Film Award for Best Male Playback Singer category.

Year	Winner	Song	Film
2013	Vijay Prakash	"Thund Haikla Savasa"	Drama
2012	Chetan Sosca	"Yaarig helona nam"	Lifeu Ishtene
2011	Rajesh Krishnan	"Neen Aadada Maathu"	Krishnan Love Story
2010	Chetan Sosca	"Yaare Nee Devatheya"	Ambaari
2008	Rajesh Krishnan	"Kariya I Love You"	Duniya

=== Best Female Playback Singer ===
The list of winners in Suvarna Film Award for Best Female Playback Singer category.

Year	Winner	Song	Film
2013	Vani Harikrishna	"Mussanje Veleli"	Addhuri
2012	Vani Harikrishna	"Hago Heego"	Saarathi
2011	Lakshmi Manmohan	"Hrudayave Bayaside"	Krishnan Love Story
2010	Shamita Malnad	"Madhura Pisumaatige"	Birugaali
2008	Nanditha	"Kariya I Love You"	Duniya

=== Best Cinematographer ===
The list of winners in Suvarna Film Award for Best Cinematographer category.

Year	Winner	Film
2013	H. C. Venu	Katari Veera Surasundarangi
2012
2011
2010
2008

=== Best Editor ===
The list of winners in Suvarna Film Award for Best Editor category.

Year	Winner	Film
2013	Shashikumar (Late)	Krantiveera Sangolli Rayanna
2012	N. M. Vishwa	Kempe Gowda
2011
2010
2008

=== Best Choreographer ===
The list of winners in Suvarna Film Award for Best Choreographer category.

Year	Winner	Film
2013	Harsha	Addhuri
2012	Harsha	Vishnuvardhana
2011
2010
2008

=== Best Art Director ===
The list of winners in Suvarna Film Award for Best Art Director category.

Year	Winner	Film
2013	Mohan Pandit	Krantiveera Sangolli Rayanna
2012
2011
2010
2008

=== Best Story, Screenplay Writer ===
The list of winners in Suvarna Film Award for Best Story, Screenplay Writer category.

Year	Winner	Film
2013	Keshavaditya	Kraanthiveera Sangolli Raayanna
2012
2011
2010
2008

=== Best Makeup ===
The list of winners in Suvarna Film Award for Best Makeup category.

Year	Winner	Film
2013	M. Rajanna	Kalpana
2012
2011
2010
2008

=== Best Costume Designer ===
The list of winners in Suvarna Film Award for Best Costume Designer category.

Year	Winner	Film
2013	Laxman	Kraanthiveera Sangolli Raayanna
2012
2011
2010
2008

=== Best Stunt Director ===
The list of winners in Suvarna Film Award for Best Stunt Director category.

Year	Winner	Film
2013	Ravivarma	Kraanthiveera Sangolli Raayanna
2012
2011
2010
2008

=== Best Dialogue Writer ===
The list of winners in Suvarna Film Award for Best Dialogue Writer category.

Year	Winner	Film
2013	Vijay Prasad	Sidlingu
2012
2011
2010
2008

== Favorite Awards ==
=== Favorite Hero ===
The list of winners in Suvarna Film Award for Favorite Hero category voted by audience.

Year	Actor	Film
2013	Puneeth Rajkumar	Anna Bond
2012	Darshan	Sarathi
2011	Vishnuvardhan	Aptharakshaka
2010	Sudeep	Veera Madakari
2008	Ganesh	Galipata

=== Favorite Heroine ===
The list of winners in Suvarna Film Award for Favorite Heroine category voted by audience.

Year	Actor	Film
2013	Radhika Pandit	Drama
2012	Ramya	Sanju Weds Geetha
2011	Ramya	Just Maath Maathalli
2010	Pooja Gandhi	Gokula
2008	Ramya	N/A

=== Favorite Director ===
The list of winners in Suvarna Film Award for Favorite Director category voted by audience.

Year	Director	Film
2013
2012
2011	Upendra	Super
2010
2008

=== Favorite Film ===
The list of winners in Suvarna Film Award for Favorite Film category voted by audience.

Year	Film	Producer
2013	Addhuri	C.M.R. Shankar Reddy; Keerthi Swamy
2012
2011	Super	Rockline Venkatesh
2010
2008

=== Favorite Song ===
The list of winners in Suvarna Film Award for Favorite Song category voted by audience.

Year	Song	Film
2013	"Pyaarge Age Bittaithe"	Govindaya Namaha
2012
2011	"Gaaliye Nodu Baa"	Sanchari
2010
2008

=== Star Pair of the Year ===
The list of winners in Suvarna Film Award for Star Pair of the Year category.

Year	Winner	Film
2013	Not Given	Not Given
2012	Not Given	Not Given
2011	Not Given	Not Given
2010	Srinagar Kitty and Radhika Pandit	Olave Jeevana Lekkachaara
2008	Not Given	Not Given

== Special awards ==
=== Contribution To Kannada Cinema ===
The list of winners in Suvarna Film Award for Contribution To Kannada Cinema also called as Lifetime Achievement.

Year	Winner
2013	Srinath
2012	Not Given
2011	Parvathamma Rajkumar
2010	Not Given
2008	Dr. Vishnuvardhan

=== Entertainer of the year ===
The list of winners in Suvarna Film Award for Entertainer of the year category.

Year	Winner
2013	Komal (for Govindaaya Namaha)
2012	Not Given
2011	Shivarajkumar
2010	Puneeth Rajkumar
2008	Not Given

=== Excellence in Kannada cinema ===
The list of winners in Suvarna Film Award for Excellence in Kannada cinema category.

Year	Winner
2013	Not Given
2012	Not Given
2011	Ambareesh
2010	Not Given
2008	Not Given

=== Critic Award for Actor ===
The list of winners in Suvarna Film Award for Critic Award for Actor

Year	Winner	Film
2013	Duniya Vijay	Bheema Theeradalli
2012	Not Given	Not Given
2011	Not Given	Not Given
2010	Not Given	Not Given
2008	Not Given	Not Given

=== Critic Award for Actress ===
The list of winners in Suvarna Film Award for Critic Award for Actress

Year	Winner	Film
2013	Ragini Dwivedi	Shiva
2012	Not Given	Not Given
2011	Not Given	Not Given
2010	Not Given	Not Given
2008	Not Given	Not Given

=== Find of the year ===
The list of winners in Suvarna Film Award for Find of the Year category.

Year	Winner	Film
2013	Not Given	Not Given
2012	Not Given	Not Given
2011	Purusotham (director)	Modala Sala
2010	Not Given	Not Given
2008	Not Given	Not Given

=== Special Award For Performance ===
The list of winners in Suvarna Film Award for Special Award For Performance category.

Year	Winner	Film
2013	Not Given	Not Given
2012	Not Given	Not Given
2011	Not Given	Not Given
2010	Not Given	Not Given
2008	Upendra	Anatharu

=== Mirchi Star of the Year Male ===
The list of winners in Suvarna Film Award for Mirchi Star of the Year Male category.

Year	Winner	Film
2013	Yash	Drama
2012	Not Given	Not Given
2011	Not Given	Not Given
2010	Not Given	Not Given
2008	Not Given	Not Given

=== Mirchi Star of the Year Female ===
The list of winners in Suvarna Film Award for Mirchi Star of the Year Female category.

Year	Winner	Film
2013	Deepa Sannidhi	Saarathi
2012	Not Given	Not Given
2011	Not Given	Not Given
2010	Not Given	Not Given
2008	Not Given	Not Given

=== Glamorous Icon of the Year ===
The list of winners in Suvarna Film Award for Glamorous Icon of the Year category.

Year	Winner	Film
2013	Parul Yadav	Govindaya Namaha
2012	Not Given	Not Given
2011	Not Given	Not Given
2010	Not Given	Not Given
2008	Not Given	Not Given
