= 2008–09 Karnataka State Film Awards =

Annual Indian film awards ceremony

43rd Karnataka State Film Awards
- Awarded for: Best Of Kannada Films in 2008

The Karnataka State Film Awards 2008–09, presented by the Government of Karnataka, recognised the best Kannada-language films released in the year 2008-09.

== Lifetime achievement award ==
Name of Award	Awardee(s)	Awarded As
• Dr. Rajkumar Award • Puttanna Kanagal Award • Lifetime Contribution to Kannada Cinema Award	• B. Sarojadevi • Girish Karnad • Ajanta Raju and RNK Prasad	• Actress • Director • Producers

== Jury ==
The awardees were chosen by a jury headed by veteran director H. R. Bhargava from the 73 films shortlisted. The panel consisted of nine-member team.

== Film awards ==
Name of Award	Film	Producer	Director
First Best Film	Kabaddi	Anoop Gowda, N. Asha, D. V. Rajendra Prasad, G. K. Ravi, K. Raju, G. Kishor Kumar	Narendra Babu
Second Best Film	Jhossh	S. Sanjay Babu	Shivamani
Third Best Film	Shankara Punyakoti	Srinivas Sooda	G. Murthy
Best Film Of Social Concern	Mukhaputa	Narayan Hosmane, Subraya Hosmane, Roopa Iyer	Roopa Iyer
Best Children Film	Chaitanya		A. K. Shivaraju
Best Regional Film	Ponnara Manasu (Kodava language); Sona (Lambadi language)		

== Other awards ==
Name of Award	Film	Awardee(s)
Best Direction	Kabaddi	Narendra Babu
Best Actor	Ambari	Yogesh
Best Actress	Moggina Manasu	Radhika Pandit
Best Supporting Actor	Gaggara	M. K. Math
Best Supporting Actress	Vamshi	Lakshmi
Best Child Actor	Nanda Deepa	Manoj
Best Child Actress	Vimukthi	Saniya Iyer
Best Music Direction	Taj Mahal	Abhimann Roy
Best Male Playback Singer	Ambari ("Yaare Nee Devatheya")	Chetan Sosca
Best Female Playback Singer	Mandakini ("")	Nanditha
Best Cinematography	Neenyare	K. M. Vishnuvardhan
Best Editing	Junglee	Deepu. S. Kumar
Best Lyrics	Ganga Kaveri	K. Kalyan
Best Sound Recording	Psycho	Kumar
Best Art Direction	Neenyare	K. Raju
Best Story Writer	Ugragami	Baraguru Ramachandrappa
Best Screenplay	Junglee	Duniya Soori
Best Dialogue Writer	Kabaddi	Hu. Pattanashetty & Narendra Babu
Best Male Dubbing Artist	Antaragange	Ravindranath
Best Female Dubbing Artist	Shankara Punyakoti	Asha
