= Moggina Manasu =

2008 Indian film by Shashank

- Film poster
- Directed by: Shashank
- Screenplay by: Shashank
- Produced by: E. Krishnappa
- Starring: Radhika Pandit; Shubha Poonja; Yash
- Cinematography: K. S. Chandrasekhar
- Edited by: Suresh Urs
- Music by: Mano Murthy
- Production company: E. K. Entertainers
- Release date: 18 July 2008
- Running time: 149 minutes
- Country: India
- Language: Kannada

Moggina Manasu (transl. A bud's heart) is a 2008 Indian Kannada-language romantic drama film directed by Shashank and produced by E. Krishnappa under the banner E. K. Entertainers. It stars Radhika Pandit and Shuba Punja in lead roles. The supporting cast features Yash, Jadi Akash, Skanda, Manoj, Sangeetha Shetty, Manasi and Harsha.

The film was a critical and a commercial success at the box-office having received appreciation from critics and audience alike. The film also completed a 100-day run at a theatre in Bangalore. The film was remade in Telugu as Lokame Kothaga.

== Plot ==
The plot explores love, friendship and their impact on life, following Chanchala's experiences after she begins further studies at college.

The story opens with Chanchala on a train, reading a letter from her college friend Deeksha inviting her to a reunion. After observing a mother and daughter discussing the daughter's first day at college, Chanchala recalls her own arrival. Her parents encourage her to focus on her studies, but two senior girls stop and tease her by making her perform a task. When she cries afterwards, they comfort her and offer their friendship. The seniors, whom she calls Akka/Deeksha and Didi, become her mentors and closest friends.

Chanchala befriends Renuka Devi (Renu), a small-town girl whose father accompanies her to college. Renu comes from a distant village and hopes to become a doctor after losing her mother because there was no nearby medical care. Their first class is taught by English teacher Ramesh, who later influences Chanchala. Chanchala and Renu grow close to Akka and Didi, who introduce them to dating and fashion. After a makeover, the girls attract attention. When Ramesh gives Chanchala a lift during heavy rain, she develops feelings for him. On Teachers' Day, however, she overhears him explaining to another student that her feelings are infatuation rather than love, and encouraging her to value him as a teacher. Chanchala realises her own feelings are similarly misplaced and abandons the idea of confessing them.

Meanwhile, Renu meets Akash through the seniors' boyfriends and falls in love with him. Chanchala, feeling left out, eventually accepts the advances of a boy who repeatedly claims to love her and even threatens suicide when she rejects him. He joins her circle but becomes controlling, eventually demanding that she stop associating with Akka, Didi and Renu. When Chanchala refuses to choose between them, he leaves her. After falling ill and being cared for by her parents, she realises she does not need such a relationship and tells him to forget her.

Deeksha, frustrated by her father's controlling behaviour, leaves home despite her mother's pleas. Renu meanwhile becomes increasingly involved with Akash, despite Chanchala's warning that she should slow down and concentrate on her studies. Renu's father sells their land to fund her education and asks her to sign the relevant papers. She does so before meeting Akash at a resort, where they spend time partying.

Chanchala admires Deeksha's boyfriend for supporting her dream of pursuing basketball despite leaving his own studies. Later, at the beach, Chanchala encounters a child playing a handmade violin and selling similar toys to fund his education. Touched by his situation, she spends her entire pocket money buying as many as she can. Rahul photographs her and later apologises for doing so without permission, inviting her to his parents' 25th wedding anniversary. At the event, Chanchala discovers that Rahul's family sponsors the same child. Rahul asks her out, but she gives no answer. They nevertheless become close, and he shares songs from his forthcoming album with her.

Deeksha's mother dies, but her father prevents Deeksha from attending the funeral and slaps her boyfriend. Deeksha falls into depression, and their relationship ends amid repeated arguments.

Renu later tells Akash that she is pregnant and wants to marry him. He dismisses the idea as impractical, asks her to have an abortion, and refuses responsibility. Renu confides in Chanchala and Akka, who condemn her actions and urge her to terminate the pregnancy. Renu questions how she can kill a life when she intends to become a doctor and save lives. Akka warns that Akash will abandon her, citing her sister's experience as evidence of men's unreliability.

Chanchala subsequently discusses love and life with Rahul, who declares that he will never leave her. She then receives news that Renu has committed suicide. Devastated and believing that all men are alike, Chanchala ends her relationship with Rahul without explanation.

In the present, Deeksha collects Chanchala from the station and takes her home, where Chanchala finds that Deeksha is happily married and has a daughter. At the college reunion, they meet Akka, who is also happily married, and reminisce about Renu. Chanchala notices Ramesh and leaves to meet him, but hears Rahul singing one of the songs he once played for her. She rushes to the auditorium and finds him performing. When she embraces him, he does not reciprocate, saying that her memories remain only in his songs, not his heart.

Heartbroken, Chanchala leaves, but later returns to watch the performance. Rahul then announces that he has found his true love again and, with the audience's blessing, proposes to Chanchala. Their parents approve, and the two reconcile.

== Cast ==
- Shubha Poonja as Renuka Devi
- Radhika Pandit as Chanchala
- Manasi as Deeksha
- Sangeetha Shetty as Sanjana
- Yash as Rahul
- Harsha
- Jadi Akash as Akash
- Manoj
- Skanda
- Rajesh Nataranga as Ramesh, professor
- Sharan
- Achyuth Kumar as Chanchala's father
- Sudha Belawadi as Chanchala's mother
- Jai Jagadish as Deeksha's father
- Tulasi as Deeksha's mother
- Vijay Kashi as Krishnamurthy
- Chitra Shenoy as Krishnamurthy's wife
- Kishan Shrikanth as Chanchala's brother

● Dr. Chikkahejjaji Mahadev as Renuka's Father

== Soundtrack ==
Moggina Manasu
- Soundtrack cover

Soundtrack album by Mano Murthy
- Released: 12 July 2008
- Genre: Feature film soundtrack
- Length: 47:56
- Language: Kannada
- Label: Anand Audio
- Producer: Mano Murthy

Mano Murthy composed the music for the film and the soundtrack. The soundtrack album consists of eleven tracks.

Track listing
No.	Title	Lyrics	Singer(s)	Length
1.	"Gari Gari"	Shashank	Chetan Sosca	4:19
2.	"Geleya Beku"	Jayant Kaikini	K. S. Chithra, Priya Himesh	5:01
3.	"I Love You"	Shashank	Sonu Nigam	4:37
4.	"I Love You (Bit)"	Shashank	Sonu Nigam	1:01
5.	"Male Baruvahaagide"	Jayant Kaikini	Shreya Ghoshal	4:43
6.	"Moggina Manasali"	Shashank	Shreya Ghoshal	5:09
7.	"Moggina Manasali (Pathos)"	Shashank	Vijay Prakash	5:04
8.	"O Nanna Manave"	V. Nagendra Prasad	Sonu Nigam	5:16
9.	"Om Namha Om"	Sini	Kumar Sanu	4:26
10.	"Teenage Teenage"	Shashank	Chaitra H. G., Inchara	3:12
11.	"Yakhing Hadtharo"	Shashank	Akanksha Badami	5:08
Total length:				47:56

== Critical reception ==
Upon its theatrical release, Moggina Manasu received generally positive response from critics. Sify.com gave the film a rating of three out of five and praised the roles of music, cinematography and the acting departments in the film writing, "The spectacular cinematography and music for this film is good. Each and every frame is taken with utmost care and all the songs are tolerable and soothing to the ears. A new promising heroine Radhika Pandit is the surprise element who is extraordinary in her first film." and further added writing, "Shubha Punja has also done a neat job and the other two girls Sangeetha Shetty and Manasi also fit the bill perfectly. Among the boys, it is Yash who stands out, though the performances of Skanda, Harsha and Manoj is good." R. G. Vijayasarathy of Rediff too gave the film a 3/5 rating and wrote, "Great performances from the new talents, superior technical work by cameraman, great work by Chandrashekhar and good editing by Suresh Urs, enhance the film." However, he called for "more attention should have been paid to the screenplay."

== Awards ==
Award	Category	Recipient	Result	Ref.
56th Filmfare Awards South	Best Film	E. Krishnappa	Won	
56th Filmfare Awards South	Best Director	Shashank	Won	
56th Filmfare Awards South	Best Actress	Radhika Pandit	Won	
56th Filmfare Awards South	Best Supporting Actor	Yash	Won	
56th Filmfare Awards South	Best Supporting Actress	Shubha Poonja	Won	
56th Filmfare Awards South	Best Music Director	Mano Murthy	Nominated	
56th Filmfare Awards South	Best Female Playback Singer	Shreya Ghoshal	Nominated	
56th Filmfare Awards South	Best Actor	Yash	Nominated	
56th Filmfare Awards South	Best Lyricist	Shashank	Nominated	
2008-09 Karnataka State Film Awards	Best Actress	Radhika Pandit	Won	
