= Filmfare Award for Best Actress – Kannada =

Indian annual film award

- Awarded for: Best Performance by an Actress in a Leading Role in Kannada films
- Country: India
- Presented by: Filmfare
- First award: Kalpana for Yaava Janmada Maitri (1972)
- Currently held by: Akshatha Pandavapura for Koli Esru (2024)
- Website: http://filmfareawards.indiatimes.com/

The Filmfare Award for Best Actress – Kannada is given by the Filmfare magazine as part of its annual Filmfare Awards South for Kannada films (Sandalwood). The awards were extended to "Best Actress" in 1972. The year indicates the year of release of the film.

== Superlatives ==
Superlative	Actress	Record
Actor with most awards	Aarathi, Saritha	4 wins
Actor with most nominations	Ramya	7 nominations
Actor with most consecutive wins	Radhika Pandit	3 wins
Actor with most nominations without ever winning	Hariprriya, Rachita Ram	3 nominations
Oldest winner	Lakshmi	41 years
Oldest nominee	Suhasini	46 years
Youngest winner	Malashri	18 years
Youngest nominee	Hariprriya	18 years

== Multiple wins ==
Radhika Pandit won the award in three consecutive years (2008, 2009 and 2010)

The following recipients have received two or more Best Actress awards:

Wins	Actress
4	Aarathi; Saritha
3	Suhasini; Radhika Pandit
2	Jayanthi, Shruti, Sudha Rani, Soundarya, Ramya

== Multiple nominations ==
The following individuals have received three or more Best Actress nominations overall:

Nominations	Actress
7	Ramya
6	Radhika Pandit
4	Aarathi, Saritha, Suhasini Maniratnam
3	Shruti, Hariprriya, Rachita Ram, Shwetha Srivatsav, Sruthi Hariharan

== Winners ==
Year	Actress	Role	Film	Ref
2024	Akshatha Pandavapura	Huchheeri	Koli Esru	
2023	Siri Ravikumar	Prerana	Swathi Mutthina Male Haniye	
2022	Chaithra J Achar	Saaki	Taledanda	
2020–21	Yagna Shetty	Geetha	Act 1978	
2019	AWARDS FUNCTION WAS SUSPENDED DUE TO COVID-19 PANDEMIC			
2018	Manvitha Kamath	Punarvasu	Tagaru	
2017	Sruthi Hariharan	Nandini	Beautiful Manasugalu	
2016	Shraddha Srinath	Rachana	U Turn	
2015	Parul Yadav	Mallika	Aatagara	
2014	Shwetha Srivatsav	Bhumika	Fair & Lovely	
2013	Amulya	Shravani	Shravani Subramanya	
2012	Priyamani	• Chaaru • Latha	Chaarulatha	
2011	Ramya	Geetha	Sanju Weds Geetha	
2010	Radhika Pandit	Geetha	Krishnan Love Story	
2009	Radhika Pandit	Khushi	Love Guru	
2008	Radhika Pandit	Chanchala	Moggina Manasu	
2007	Rashmi	Poornima	Duniya	
2006	Ramya	Vanaja	Tananam Tananam	
2005	Vidya Venkatesh	Indu	Nenapirali	
2004	Soundarya	Ganga	Apthamitra	
2003	Meena	Lalitha	Swathi Muthu	
2002	Soundarya	Naagi	Dweepa	
2001	Prema	Sangeetha	Kanasugara	
2000	Sudha Rani	Radha	Sparsha	
1999	Tara	Subbamma Heggadithi	Kanooru Heggadithi	
1998	Jayamala	Narmada Thaayi Saheba	Thaayi Saheba	
1997	Vijayalakshmi	Rani	Nagamandala	
1996	Shilpa	Kanaka	Janumada Jodi	
1995	Shruti	Usha	Aagatha	
1994	Shruti		Hettha Karulu	
1993	Lakshmi	Ramabai	Hoovu Hannu	
1992	Sudha Rani	Padma	Mysooru Mallige	
1991	Malashri	Asha	Hrudaya Haadithu	
1990	Suhasini Maniratnam	Annapoorna	Muthina Haara	
1989	Saritha	Banneri	Sankranthi	
1988	Suhasini Maniratnam	Hema	Suprabhatha	
1987	Geetha	Kamala	Shruthi Seridaaga	
1986	Saritha		Mouna Geethe	
1985	Saritha	Kamala	Mugila Mallige	
1984	Abhinaya	Gowri	Anubhava	
1983	Suhasini Maniratnam	Kavitha	Benkiyalli Aralida Hoovu	
1982	Saritha	Vathsala	Hosa Belaku	
1981	Aarathi	Ranganayaki / Mala	Ranganayaki	
1980	Ashwini	Savithri	Savithri	
1979	Aarathi	Thunga	Dharmasere	
1978	Shobha	Kusuma	Aparichita	
1977	Manjula	Deepa	Deepa	
1976	Jayanthi	Thulasi	Tulasi	
1975	Aarathi	Hema	Shubhamangala	
1974	Aarathi	Sharada	Upasane	
1973	Jayanthi	Madhavi	Edakallu Guddada Mele	
1972	Kalpana	Lalitha	Yaava Janmada Maitri	

== Nominations ==
- 2005 Vidya Venkatesh – Nenapirali as Sindhu
  - Meena – My Autograph as Divya
  - Shilpa Shetty – Auto Shankar as Maya
  - Ramya – Amrithadhare as Amritha
  - Radhika Kumaraswamy – Anna Thangi as Lakshmi
- 2006 Ramya – Tananam Tananam as Vanaja
  - Meera Jasmine – Arasu as Aishwarya
  - Rakshitha – Neenello Naanalle as Siri
  - Radhika Kumaraswamy – Hatavadi as Anisha
- 2007 Rashmi – Duniya as Poornima
  - Parvathy Thiruvothu – Milana as Anjali
  - Suhasini – Maathaad Maathaadu Mallige as Kanaka
  - Jaya Prada - Ee Bandhana as Nandini
- 2008 Radhika Pandit – Moggina Manasu as Chanchala
  - Daisy Bopanna – Gaalipata as Soumya
  - Pooja Gandhi – Taj Mahal as Shruti
  - Ramya – Mussanjemaatu as Tanu
  - Suhasi – Haage Summane as Khushi
- 2009 Radhika Pandit – Love Guru as Kushi
  - Haripriya – Kallara Santhe as Roopa
  - Priyamani – Raam as Pooja
  - Priyanka Kothari – Raaj The Showman as Parvathy
  - Rekha – Parichaya as Nirmala (Nimmi)
- 2010 Radhika Pandit – Krishnan Love Story as Geetha
  - Aindrita Ray – Veera Parampare
  - Nayanthara – Super as Indira
  - Nidhi Subbaiah – Pancharangi as Ambika
  - Ramya – Just Math Mathalli as Tanu
- 2011 Ramya – Sanju Weds Geetha as Geetha
  - Deepa Sannidhi – Paramathma as Deepa aka Thithi Vade
  - Nidhi Subbaiah – Krishnan Marriage Story as Khushi
  - Radhika Pandit – Hudugaru as Gayathri
  - Ragini Dwivedi – Kempe Gowda as Kavya
- 2012 Priyamani – Chaarulatha
  - Pooja Gandhi – Dandupalya
  - Pranitha Subhash – Bheema Theeradalli
  - Radhika Pandit – Addhuri
  - Ramya – Sidlingu
- 2013 Amulya – Shravani Subramanya
  - Aindrita Ray – Bhajarangi
  - Meghana Gaonkar – Charminar
  - Nithya Menen – Mynaa
  - Rachita Ram – Bulbul
  - Shwetha Srivatsav – Simple Agi Ondh Love Story
- 2014 Shwetha Srivatsav – Fair & Lovely
  - Haripriya – Ugramm
  - Kriti Kharbanda – Super Ranga
  - Radhika Pandit – Mr. and Mrs. Ramachari
  - Ragini Dwivedi – Ragini IPS
- 2015 Parul Yadav – Aatagara
  - Mayuri Kyatari – Krishna Leela
  - Nabha Natesh – Vajrakaya
  - Rachita Ram – Ranna
  - Shanvi Srivastava – Masterpiece
- 2016 Shraddha Srinath – U Turn
  - Hariprriya – Neer Dose
  - Parul Yadav – Killing Veerappan
  - Shwetha Srivatsav – Kiragoorina Gayyaligalu
  - Sruthi Hariharan – Godhi Banna Sadharana Mykattu
- 2017 Sruthi Hariharan – Beautiful Manasugalu
  - Nivedihta – Shuddhi
  - Rashmika Mandanna – Chamak
  - Shanvi Srivastava – Tarak
  - Shraddha Srinath – Operation Aalamelamma
- 2018 Manvitha Kamath – Tagaru
  - Ashika Ranganath – Raambo 2
  - Meghana Raj – Iruvudellava Bittu
  - Nishvika Naidu -Amma I Love You
  - Sruthi Hariharan – Nathicharami
- 2020–21 Yagna Shetty – Act 1978
  - Aarohi Narayan – Bheemasena Nalamaharaja
  - Amrutha Iyengar – Badava Rascal
  - Asha Bhat – Roberrt
  - Kushee Ravi – Dia
  - Milana Nagaraj – Love Mocktail
  - Reba Monica John – Rathnan Prapancha
- 2022 Chaithra J. Achar – Taledanda as Saaki
  - Aishani Shetty – Dharani Mandala Madhyadolage as Shreya
  - Ganavi Laxman – Vedha as Pushpa
  - Meghana Gaonkar – Shubhamangala as Anu
  - Rachita Ram – Monsoon Raaga as Asma Begum
  - Sapthami Gowda – Kantara as Leela
- 2023 Siri Ravikumar – Swathi Mutthina Male Haniye as Prerana
  - Akshatha Pandavapura – Pinki Elli
  - Amrutha Prem – Tagaru Palya as Jyothi
  - Milana Nagaraj – Kousalya Supraja Rama as Muthulakshmi
  - Rukmini Vasanth – Sapta Saagaradaache Ello as Priya
  - Sindhu Sreenivasa Murthy – Aachar & Co as Suma
- 2024 Akshatha Pandavapura – Koli Esru as Hucchheeri
  - Ankita Amar – Ibbani Tabbida Ileyali as Anahita Madhumita Banarjee
  - Bindu Shivaram – Kerebete as Meena
  - Chaithra J Achar – Blink as Devaki
  - Roshni Prakash – Murphy as Janani
  - Rukmini Vasanth – Bagheera as Dr. Sneha

== Notes ==
- Ramachandran, T.M. (1973). Film world. Vol. 9.
- The Times of India directory and year book including who's who. Times of India Press. 1984.
