= Breaking News (2012 film) =

- Film poster
- Directed by: Nagathihalli Chandrashekar
- Written by: Nagathihalli Chandrashekar
- Produced by: Nagathihalli Chandrashekar; A. V. Krishnakumar; M. Rajakumar; Hanumantha S. Reddy
- Starring: Ajay Rao; Radhika Pandit
- Cinematography: A. V. Krishna Kumar
- Edited by: G. Basavaraj Urs
- Music by: Stephen Prayog
- Production company: Nagathihalli Creations
- Release date: 18 May 2012
- Running time: 132 minutes
- Country: India
- Language: Kannada

Breaking News is a 2012 Indian Kannada-language satirical film written, directed and produced by Nagathihalli Chandrashekar. It stars Ajay Rao and Radhika Pandit in lead roles. Anant Nag, Rangayana Raghu and Kaddipudi Chandru feature in supporting roles. The film revolves around an idealistic television producer (Rao) who becomes entangled in a conspiracy involving the kidnapping of a Lokayukta's daughter (Pandit) amid a high-profile land scam investigation in the backdrop of his company's hunger for sensationalized news.

Stephen Prayog scored music for the film and A. V. Krishna Kumar served as the cinematographer. Upon theatrical release on 18 May 2012, the film received mixed reviews from critics.

== Plot ==
Arjun works as a producer and host for Sakala TV, a television news channel, where he prefers presenting meaningful and socially relevant programmes, including one highlighting the benefits of ragi mudde. However, the channel's managing director is obsessed with sensationalism and constantly pressures him to deliver controversial stories and exclusive scoops to improve television ratings. At the same time, Lokayukta Somashekhar launches an investigation into a site denotification scam involving ministers, former ministers, and influential businessmen who have illegally acquired government land in their own names and those of their relatives. Among those affected by the probe are the managing director of a company named Do and his son. Falling to Shraddha's prank and subsequently failed attempt to secure an exclusive interview with the Lokayukta, her father, Arjun is dismissed from his job.

Soon after, Arjun overhears a plot by the managing director's associates to kidnap Somashekhar's daughter Shraddha. Acting on his own, he abducts her from the kidnappers and hides her in a safe house, while secretly holding her hostage. Arjun then exploits the situation to regain his employer's trust by supplying the channel with exclusive video footage of Shraddha, leading to a dramatic rise in the channel's ratings and restoring his popularity. Shraddha cooperates willingly, as she is relieved to escape an arranged marriage to an eccentric US-based professional named Sam. During their time together, Arjun and Shraddha begin to develop feelings for one another.

Arjun later feels guilty about his actions while receiving an award for his journalistic success. Meanwhile, the managing director and his men eventually capture Shraddha and demand that Arjun obtain the denotification documents and force the Lokayukta to withdraw the case against them. Arjun conveys their demands to the principled Lokayukta, who refuses to compromise despite the danger to his daughter. Realizing the consequences of his actions, Arjun confronts the managing director and his associates. The police soon arrive and arrest the managing director and his son. In a comic climax, Shraddha's wedding to Sam is interrupted, and she ultimately marries Arjun instead.

== Cast ==
- Ajay Rao as Arjun
- Radhika Pandit as Shraddha
- Anant Nag as Somashekhar
- Shivaram as Karmananda, principal of a college
- Rangayana Raghu as managing director of Do Company
- Sadhu Kokila as Roland Richard Louis, Shraddha's music instructor
- Arun Sagar as P. K. Somappa "Pi Ka So", Arjun friend and painter
- Kaddipudi Chandru as managing director's son (credited as Chandru Shwanapriya)
- Sihi Kahi Chandru as Gundanna, Somashekhar's family cook
- Chi. Guru Dutt as Sub-inspector Rangaswamy
- Mandya Ramesh
- Vaijanath Biradar as Shraddha's karate instructor
- Chidanand as Sannappa Santhe Bachhalli "Sam"
- Kasaragodu Chinna
- Karibasavaiah as Kariyappa, a photographer
- Rohini Raghunandan as Somashekar's wife
- Shailaja Joshi
- Shantala Vattam
- Kiranmayi
- Veena Bhat
- Rohith Kumar Kateel
- Yashwant Sardeshpande as Arjun's supervisor
- Gayathri R. Kumar
- Avinash Bharadhwaj
- Bank Janardhan as Ruchiyappa, an expert on ragi
- Nagathihalli Chandrashekhar as jailer
- NGEF Ramamurthy as Sam's father
- Gundumani
- Mutthuraj
- Malleshi
- R. G. Vijayasarathy as Subbanna, Somashekhar's family driver
- Mimicry Dayanand as himself

== Production ==
The film was announced in September 2011. Director Nagathihalli Chandrashekar called it a "modern taken on romance against the backdrop of visual media." He stated that his return to the romance drama genre was "an experiment and I have no illusions of it being a superhit, nor do I fear it becoming a big flop."

It was reported in the following month that Ajay Rao and Radhika Pandit were signed to play the lead roles. They had previously been paired opposite in Krishnan Love Story (2010). This was Pandit's second collaboration with Chandrashekar after Olave Jeevana Lekkachaara (2009), and Rao's first. Pandit called her character in the film "very hot-headed, rich, spoilt brat", while Rao stated that he would play an ethical media person and that "[had] been preparing for the role by observing journalists at press conferences." The report added that filming would complete in December that year, and that Anant Nag, Rangayana Raghu and Arun Sagar would appear in prominent roles in the film, in addition to Ambareesh, who had been approached to play a pivotal role. Stephen Prayog was hired to score music for the film, and Chandrashekar and Yogaraj Bhat reportedly wrote lyrics for the flm's soundtrack.

In one of his looks for the film, Rao sported a mask similar to Hrithik Roshan's character in Krrish (2006). It also drew comparison to Vikram in Anniyan (2005). However, Chandrashekar denied any connection to these characters. Rao's attire was all black, with a cape/trenchcoat and a mask. He stated that it was only for a song sequence, and that "...masked getup comes into play everytime I source and present breaking news on TV. The film is primarily about how television media goes all out on some stories to create hype."

== Soundtrack ==
No.	Title	Lyrics	Singer(s)	Length
1.	"Muddege Saaru"	Yogaraj Bhat	Tippu
2.	"Sambandha"	Nagathihalli Chandrashekar	Rajesh Krishnan, Anuradha Bhat
3.	"Hudugi Baare"	Nagathihalli Chandrashekar	V. Harikrishna, Chaitra H. G.
4.	"Sundari Sura Sundari"	Nagathihalli Chandrashekar	Chinmayi
5.	"Haalu Kaanada"	Damodar Shetty	Hemanth Kumar
6.	"Nanage Banthu"	Nagathihalli Chandrashekar	Anuradha Bhat, Sadhu Kokila, Srinivas, Chetan Sosca, Vijay Urs, Shantala Vattam, Mohan

== Critical reception ==
A critic from The Times of India scored the film at 3.5 out of 5 stars and says "Ajai Rao is at his best as a journalist, Radhika Pandit looks bold and beautiful with a fight too. Rangayana Raghu is at his best as a politician. Music by Stephen Prayag has some catchy tunes. Camera by AV Krishnakumar is good". Srikanth Srinivasa from Rediff.com scored the film at 2.5 out of 5 stars and wrote "The music by Stephen Prayog is okay. The film falls below the benchmark Nagathihalli Chandrashekar set with his earlier films. Krishna Kumar's camera work is just average. Breaking News is a light-hearted movie with bad production values". Shruti I. L. from DNA wrote "The film contrary to its title brings nothing new with it nor does it make an impact. If anything it leaves you disappointed, more so as it comes from someone like Chandrashekar." A critic from Bangalore Mirror wrote, "Throughout the film, Ajai Rao acts like a trainee reporter who has just been handed a mike and a cameraman to tow him. Only Anant Nag has a real role to play in the film. The rest — from Rangayana Raghu to Sadhu Kokila — were perhaps roped in for a circus show. The songs have a sense of purpose and are set to good tunes."

== See also ==
- Mass media in India
- Lists of television channels in India
