= Shashank (director) =

Indian Kannada cinema film director

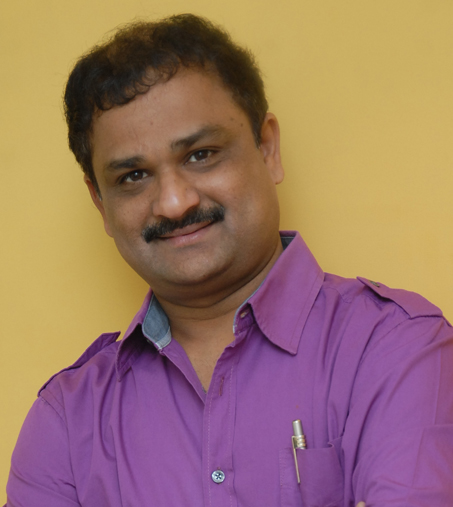
- Born: 24 June 1972 (age 53); Taalya, Chitradurga, Karnataka, India
- Occupations: Film director; screenwriter; lyricist
- Years active: 2007–present
- Spouse: Veena H.M
- Children: 2

Shashank (born 24 June 1972) is an Indian film director, screenwriter and lyricist who works in Kannada cinema. He made his debut as a director with the 2007 film Sixer. His second directorial Moggina Manasu (2008) received critical acclaim for its screenplay and its coming-of-age theme. He went on to direct other successful films in the romance genre such as Krishnan Love Story (2010), Bachchan (2013), Krishna-Leela (2015), Mungaru Male 2 (2016) and Love 360 (2022) He is also credited to have introduced actors Yash, Radhika Pandit, Prajwal Devraj and Neha Shetty who went on to become successful actors in Kannada cinema.

== Early life ==
Shashank was born in a small village called Talya, in Chitradurga district, Karnataka. He is the third child of his parents Hanumanthappa and Lakkamma, his father was a small farmer. However he was later adopted by his maternal uncle and aunt, Chandrashekarappa and Shantamma. Since Chandrashekarappa worked in VISL, Bhadravati, Karnataka. Shashank completed his matriculation from Bhadravati. Later he did his diploma in civil engineering (1988–91) in Chikmagalur. His birth name was Umesh B.H. which he later changed to Shashank at his mentor Hamsalekha's insistence.

== Personal life ==
He is married to Veena H.M and has two daughters, Chaitra and Khushi.

== Career ==
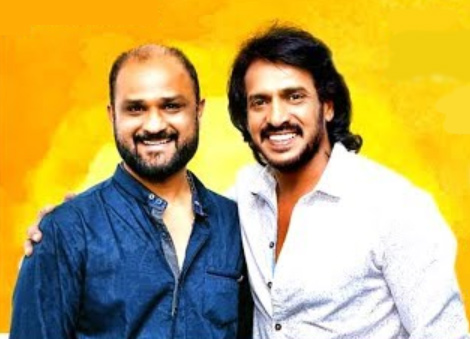
Shashank, Upendra in 2019

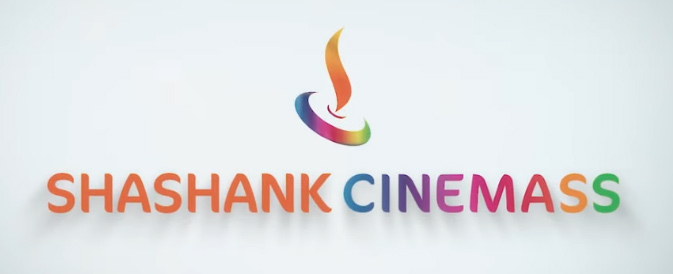
Logo of Shashank Cinemass

Shashank trained as an engineer, and worked as a site engineer in Bangalore as a site engineer. He became an assistant to S. Mahendar for the film Taayi illada tavaru (1994). He subsequently worked with music director Hamsalekha. His first movie as an independent director was Sixer from 2007, produced by Ramoji Rao with music composed by Hamsalekha.

In addition to writing screenplays, dialogues and storylines for films, he has also written song lyrics.

== Filmography ==
Year	Film	Director	Writer	Producer	Notes
2007	Sixer	Yes	Yes	No	
2008	Moggina Manasu	Yes	Yes	No	Also lyricist
2010	Krishnan Love Story	Yes	Yes	No	Also lyricist
2011	Jarasandha	Yes	Yes	No	Also lyricist
2013	Bachchan	Yes	Yes	No	Also lyricist
2015	Krishna-Leela	Yes	Yes	No	Also lyricist
2016	Mungaru Male 2	Yes	Yes	No	
2018	Thayige Thakka Maga	Yes	Yes	Yes	Also lyricist
2022	Love 360	Yes	Yes	Yes	Also lyricist
2023	Kousalya Supraja Rama	Yes	Yes	Yes	Also lyricist
2025	Brat	Yes	No	No	
TBA	Untitled with Upendra & Hariprriya†	Yes	Yes	Yes	Filming

=== Other crew positions ===
Year	Film	Writer	Lyricist	Notes
2003	Hudugigagi	Story	Yes	
2004	Bhagath	Dialogues	No	
2004	Baa Baaro Rasika	No	Yes	
2005	Yashwanth	No	Yes	
2011	Ee Bhoomi Aa Bhanu	No	Yes	
2011	Aacharya	No	Yes	
2011	Aata	Yes	No	
2012	Lucky	No	Yes	
2012	Rana	No	Yes	
2015	Muddu Manase	No	Yes	
2021	Love You Rachchu	Yes	No	

== Awards and nominations ==
Year	Film	Award	Category	Result	Ref.
2008	Moggina Manasu	56th Filmfare Awards South	Best Director	Won	
2008	Moggina Manasu	56th Filmfare Awards South	Best Lyricist	Nominated	
2010	Krishnan Love Story	58th Filmfare Awards South	Best Director	Nominated	
2010	Krishnan Love Story	Udaya Film Awards	Best Director	Won	
2010	Krishnan Love Story	Suvarna Film Awards	Best Director	Won	
2010	Krishnan Love Story	Bengaluru Habba Award	Best Director	Won	
2013	Bachchan	Chitra Santhe Awards	Blockbuster Director	Won	
2015	Krishna Leela	2015 Karnataka State Film Awards	Best Screenplay	Won	
2015	Krishna Leela	2015 Karnataka State Film Awards	Best Family Entertainer	Won	
2015	Krishna Leela	63rd Filmfare Awards South	Best Director	Nominated	
2015	Krishna Leela	1st IIFA Utsavam	Best Director	Nominated	
2015	Krishna Leela	1st IIFA Utsavam	Best Lyrics	Nominated	
2022	Love 360	Critics Award	Best Lyrics	Won	
2022	Love 360	Chitra Santhe Award	Best Thriller Movie Of The Year	Won	
2024	Kousalya Supraja Rama	3 August 2024	Best Film – Kannada	Nominated	
