= Love 360 =

Kannada film

- Theatrical release poster
- Directed by: Shashank
- Written by: Shashank
- Screenplay by: Yadunandan
- Produced by: Shashank
- Starring: Praveen Kumar; Rachana Inder
- Cinematography: Abilash Kalathi
- Edited by: Giri Mahesh
- Music by: Arjun Janya
- Production company: Shashank Cinemass
- Distributed by: KRG Studios
- Release date: 19 August 2022
- Running time: 134 minutes
- Country: India
- Language: Kannada

Love 360 is a 2022 Indian Kannada-language romantic crime thriller film directed by Shashank starring debutant Praveen Kumar and Rachana Inder. This movie is inspired from a 2009 released Korean movie Mother.

The film released on 19 August 2022 and received rave reviews from critics.

== Plot ==
Ram and Janaki alias Jaanu are childhood friends from orphanage, who grow up to become the most doting lovers. Jaanu actually suffers from Selective Memory Loss, and Ram tries to improve her mental condition, and also protect her from anyone with utmost passion. Jaanu becomes interested in Bharatanatyam, and Ram somehow gets her admitted to the school.

However, things take a disastrous turn when Jaanu is accused of killing her classmate Vibha, a rich girl. Ram begins his investigation and suspect Vibha's boyfriend Vicky, a drug peddler, and brings him to the interrogation room. Vicky reveals that Vibha planned to get her father killed in order to inherit his wealth, as her father was having an extramarital affair with another woman, but Vicky backed out of this idea, which leads to breakup between them.

Later, Ram meets Vicky's friend, who tells that he was the reason behind Vicky and Vibha's breakup. When Vicky left, Jaanu arrived to apologize to Vibha for a fight happened in the class. However, Vibha doesn't pay a heed and calls her "mental" which enrages Jaanu and kills Vibha by crushing her skull with a rock. Ram gets distraught after learning this. Later, Vicky's friend tells that he can help him save Jaanu, in exchange for sex. Enraged, Ram kills Vicky's friend and throws in the sea, and manages to frame Vicky in the murder. Jaanu is released and Ram finally moves with Jaanu to their new house.

== Cast ==
- Praveen Kumar as Raam aka Mr. Perfect 360
- Rachana Inder as Janaki aka Jaanu
- Gopalakrishna Deshpande as police inspector
- Kavya Shastri as Shilpa
- Sukanya Girish
- Danny Kuttappa
- Mahantesh Hiremath
- Sujith

== Production ==
Newcomer Praveen makes his film debut with this film.

== Soundtrack ==
Music by Arjun Janya. The song "Jagave Neenu Gelathiye" is sung by Sid Sriram.

Love 360

Soundtrack album by Arjun Janya
- Released: 2022
- Genre: Feature film soundtrack
- Length: 13:58
- Language: Kannada
- Label: Anand Audio

Arjun Janya chronology
Gaalipata 2 (2022)	Love 360 (2022)	Shiva 143 (2022)
External audio
- Love 360 – Jukebox on YouTube

Track listing
No.	Title	Lyrics	Singer(s)	Length
1.	"Jagave Neenu Gelathiye"	Shashank	Sid Sriram	4:10
2.	"Sakhiye Saavarisu"	Shashank	Sanjith Hegde	4:07
3.	"Bhorgaredu"	Shashank	Keerthan Holla	2:21
4.	"Jajaang Jaang"	Yogaraj Bhat	Arjun Janya	3:20
Total length:				13:58

== Reception ==
Love 360 received positive reviews from critics.

Shuklaji of The News Minute said that "Love 360 is a commendable take on the idea of virtues, and how true love transcends all". Jagadish Angadi of Deccan Herald opined that "The romantic thriller is a one-time watch along with family members". Sunayana Suresh of The Times of India wrote that "Eventually, Love 360 is a film that works because of its second half and the twists, irrespective of whether it may be inspired or not". A. Sharadhaa of The New Indian Express praised several aspects of the film including Shashank's direction, the actors' performance, the music and the cinematography.

=== Box office ===
The film completed 35 days run in many centres across Karnataka and was declared as a commercial success at the box office.
