= Krishna Leela (2015 film) =

- Theatrical release poster
- Directed by: Shashank
- Written by: Shashank; Raghu Kovi
- Produced by: Ajay Rao
- Starring: Ajay Rao; Mayuri Kyatari; Rangayana Raghu
- Cinematography: Shekhar Chandra
- Edited by: Naveen Raj
- Music by: Sridhar V. Sambhram
- Production companies: Sri Krishna Arts and Creations
- Distributed by: Shankar Enterprises; Ram Jagadish Films; Anand Kumar; Om Sai Release
- Release date: 20 March 2015
- Running time: 151 minutes
- Country: India
- Language: Kannada

Krishna Leela is a 2015 Indian Kannada-language romantic drama written and directed by Shashank, and produced by Ajay Rao, making his debut at production under the Shree Krishna Arts and Creations banner. Besides Rao, the film features Mayuri Kyatari, making her film debut and Rangayana Raghu in pivotal roles.

Shashank had revealed that the movie was inspired by a true incident that happened in 2010 in Bangalore. The film released on 20 March 2015 to positive reviews by critics. It completed the 100 days run successfully across theatres in Karnataka. This movie was remade in Bengali in 2021 as Miss Call.

== Plot ==
"Smile" Krishna, a school bus driver, is trying to clear his debts, and is awaiting to get engaged with his girlfriend Sindhu. One day, Krishna meets Leela after she seeks his help to get her phone recharged. They regularly speak over the phone, but have never seen each other. However, Leela’s abusive father "Benki" Mahadev, breaks her cellphone when he sees her talking to Krishna, and also files a complaint against Krishna for kidnapping Leela, but later they find that Leela is actually in her friends' PG, where they bring her to the police station.

However, Mahadev berates her for spoiling her reputation, and leaves. Later, Inspector Chandrashekhar asks Leela whether she loves Krishna, where she replies in the affirmative, and Chandrashekhar get them hitched at a temple. Krishna becomes upset and turns abusive against Leela, but soon develops feelings towards her. In order to clear Krishna's debt, Leela requests her mother for money, but Mahadev insults her, which makes an enraged Leela to become drunk and insults Mahadev by revealing his abusiveness against her and her mother to the people.

Meanwhile, Leela's antics at her house gets uploaded on the social media, and Krishna throws her out of the house and files divorce. The next day, Krishna learns about Leela's sacrifices in order to clear his debts and begins to search for her, along with Chandrashekhar and Mahadev. They find her at Nandi Hills, where Mahadev apologizes to Leela for his mistakes. Later, Krishna reunites with Leela and are happily talking to each other.

== Cast ==
- Ajai Rao as "Smile" Krishna
- Mayuri Kyatari as Leela
- Rangayana Raghu as Inspector Chandrashekar
- Shobaraj
- Dharmendra Urs as "Benki" Mahadev, Leela's father
- Achyuth Kumar as Krishna's father
- Tabla Nani as Lawyer Parameshwar
- Bullet Prakash
- Sadhu Kokila
- Suchendra Prasad
- Mico Nagaraj
- Vijay Chendoor as "Gas" prakash
- Shille Manjunath
- Sharada
- Lakshmi siddhaiah as Leela's mother
- Shwetha Srinivas
- Anusha
- Chikkahejjaji Mahadev
- Shivakumar Aradhya
- Umesh Thalya
- Auto Nagaraj
- Sindhu Lokanath in a cameo appearance as Sindhu
- Sneha Acharya as Vibha, Leela's friend

== Soundtrack ==
Krishna Leela

Soundtrack album by Sridhar V. Sambhram
- Released: November 2014
- Recorded: good film
- Genre: Feature film soundtrack
- Language: Kannada
- Label: Anand Audio

Sridhar V. Sambhram scored the film's background music, composed the soundtrack and also wrote the lyrics for the track "Pesal Man". Shashank, Sri Harsha, Shiva Thejasvi and Sai Sarvesh penned lyrics for other tracks. The soundtrack album consisting of six tracks in total featured actors Upendra and Puneeth Rajkumar singing a track each. The track "Muttlilla Murililla" drew flack due to its controversial lyrics.

Track listing
No.	Title	Singer(s)	Length
1.	"Kaadiruve Ninagagi"	Shreya Ghoshal	04:04
2.	"Krishna Calling"	Tippu, Apoorva Sridhar	04:06
3.	"Pesal Man"	Puneeth Rajkumar	04:02
4.	"Muttlilla Murililla"	Naveen Sajju	03:58
5.	"Maatadro"	Shashank Sheshagiri	03:59
6.	"Phonammangu Simmappangu"	Upendra	02:33
Total length:			22:42

== Reception ==
A critic from Bangalore Mirror wrote that "Krishna-Leela shows what team effort can do. And this team is exceptional and Shashank has led them well. One of those rare films where almost everything falls in place and the audience can’t have enough". A critic from The Times of India wrote that "This romance-drama is full of surprises. Armed with a crisp script and narrative, the director manages to keep the suspense alive right till the end".

== Awards and nominations ==
Ceremony	Category	Nominee	Result	Ref.
63rd Filmfare Awards South	Best Film	Sri Krishna Arts and Creations	Nominated	
63rd Filmfare Awards South	Best Director	Shashank	Nominated	
63rd Filmfare Awards South	Best Actor	Ajay Rao	Nominated	
63rd Filmfare Awards South	Best Actress	Mayuri Kyatari	Nominated	
63rd Filmfare Awards South	Best Music Director	V. Sridhar	Won	
IIFA Utsavam 2015	Best Picture	Sri Krishna Arts and Creations	Nominated	
IIFA Utsavam 2015	Best Director	Shashank	Nominated	
IIFA Utsavam 2015	Best Performance In A Leading Role – Male	Ajay Rao	Nominated	
IIFA Utsavam 2015	Best Performance In A Leading Role – Female	Mayuri Kyatari	Nominated	
IIFA Utsavam 2015	Best Performance In A Supporting Role – Male	Rangayana Raghu	Nominated	
IIFA Utsavam 2015	Best Performance In A Supporting Role – Female	Lakshmi Raj	Won	
IIFA Utsavam 2015	Best Performance In A Comic Role	Achyuth Kumar	Nominated	
IIFA Utsavam 2015	Best Performance In A Negative Role	Dharmendra Urs	Nominated	
IIFA Utsavam 2015	Best Music Direction	V. Sridhar	Nominated	
IIFA Utsavam 2015	Best Lyrics	Shashank (for "Kadiruve Ninagagi")	Nominated	
IIFA Utsavam 2015	Best Playback Singer - Male	Tippu (for "Krishna Calling")	Nominated	
IIFA Utsavam 2015	Best Playback Singer - Male	Shashank Sheshagiri (for "Maathaadro")	Nominated	
IIFA Utsavam 2015	Best Playback Singer - Female	Apoorva Sridhar (for "Krishna Calling")	Nominated	
2015 Karnataka State Film Awards	Best Family Entertainer	Shashank	Won	
2015 Karnataka State Film Awards	Best Screenplay	Shashank; Raghu Kovi	Won	
2015 Karnataka State Film Awards	Best Music Director	V. Sridhar	Won	
