= Sridhar V. Sambhram =

- Also known as: V. Sridhar Sambhram, Melody King
- Born: Channapatna, India
- Genres: Film score, soundtrack
- Occupations: Music director, singer, composer, lyricist
- Years active: 2008–present

Sridhar V. Sambhram (formerly credited as V. Sridhar) is an Indian film score and soundtrack composer and lyricist in the Kannada film industry. Sridhar made his film debut in the 2008 musical blockbuster Mussanje Maathu for which he received critics and masses appreciation. Since then he has composed and scored background music for successful films like Krishnan Love Story (2009), Krishnan Marriage Story (2010), Dubai Babu (2013), Jai Lalitha (2014) to name a few. He considers senior musician Hamsalekha as his mentor.

He has won Mirchi Award for Best Music Director for the film Krishnan Love Story (2012) and received a nomination at the 59th Filmfare Awards South for his composition for the film Krishnan Marriage Story. He won the Filmfare Award for the film Krishna Leela in 2015. He is Melody King of current Kannada Music Industry

== Discography ==
=== As a composer ===
Year	Film title	Notes
2008	Mussanje Maathu	Nominated - Filmfare Award for Best Music Director - Kannada; Nominated - Filmfare Award for Best Lyricist - Kannada
2009	Dubai Babu	
2009	Iniya	
2010	Sri Moksha	
2010	School Master	
2010	Krishnan Love Story	Winner - Mirchi Award for Best Music Director; Nominated — Filmfare Award for Best Music Director — Kannada
2011	5 Idiots	Background music only
2011	Krishnan Marriage Story	Nominated — Filmfare Award for Best Music Director — Kannada
2011	Jedarahalli	
2012	Sankranthi	
2012	Dashamukha	
2012	Rana	
2014	Sadagara	
2014	Jai Lalitha	
2014	Namaste Madam	
2014	Belli	
2015	Krishna-Leela	Winner - Karnataka State Film Award for Best Music Director; Winner - Filmfare Award for Best Music Director
2015	First Love	
2015	Sanju Mattu Geetha 2	
2015	Krishna-Rukku	
2016	Supari Surya	
2016	Kempammana Court Case	
2017	Mumbai	
2017	Chowka	One song only
2017	Tiger Galli	Songs only
2017	Upendra Matte Baa	25th film
2017	Sarvasva	
2017	Once More Kaurava	
2017	3 Gante 30 Dina 30 Second	
2017	Raajaru	
2018	Tunturu	Delayed release
2018	Iruvudellava Bittu	
2020	Aadyaa	
2021	Mugilpete	
2021	Huttu Habbada Shubhashayagalu	
2025	Sanju Weds Geetha 2	
2026	Life Today	
