= Sagar (2012 film) =

- Directed by: M. D. Sridhar
- Screenplay by: M. D. Shridhar
- Story by: K. S. Kumar (Note: Although the film is a remake, K. S. Kumar is still credited for the story.)
- Based on: Chukkallo Chandrudu (Telugu)
- Produced by: Ramu
- Starring: Prajwal Devaraj; Haripriya; Radhika Pandit; Sanjjana
- Cinematography: A. V. Krishna Kumar
- Edited by: P. R. Soundar Raj
- Music by: Gurukiran
- Production company: Ramu Enterprises
- Distributed by: Ramu Films
- Release date: 10 August 2012
- Running time: 158 minutes
- Country: India
- Language: Kannada

Sagar (Kannada: ಸಾಗರ್) is a 2012 Kannada-language romantic action drama film directed by M. D. Sridhar and produced by Ramu. A remake of the Telugu-language Chukkallo Chandrudu (2006), the film stars Prajwal Devaraj, alongside Radhika Pandit, Sanjjana, Haripriya, Dev Gill, Sharath Lohithaswa, Avinash Yelandur, Vinaya Prasad and Adi Lokesh. The music was composed by Gurukiran, and cinematography and editing were handled by A. V. Krishna Kumar and P. R. Soundar Raj. The film was dubbed into Hindi as Ek Aur Mr. Sherdil.

== Plot ==
Sagar, the son of aristocratic industrialist Rajasekhara Murthy, has returned home after completing his studies in Australia. Rajasekhara fixes his marriage with Priyanka. Sagar and Priyanka decides to prevent the marriage, where Sagar tells his problem to Jennifer who sends her friend Kajal's photo to wrongly portray her as his lover only to create confusion within the family.

Kajal arrives in the house and soon bonds with the family members. However, Kajal leaves the house and is captured by the goons sent by Rajasekhara's rival Sampath, but Sagar saves Kajal and brings her home, where he reveals the truth. Kajal reveals that she is the daughter of Rajasekhara's friend Dr. Janaradhan. Kajal was actually stalked by an international drug baron named Sonu Bhai, who actually killed her parents after they refused to get Kajal married to him.

Kajal soon escaped to Bangalore and decided to act as Sagar's girlfriend, but later tried to leave as Sonu had arrived in Bangalore and was tracking her again with Sampath's help. Rajasekhara, Sagar and his family decides to protect Kajal. During a factory inauguration, Kajal is kidnapped again by Sampath and his son who soon gets killed by Sonu. Sagar tracks down Sonu's location and brutally thrashes him. In the aftermath, Sagar and Kajal finally reunite.

== Cast ==
- Prajwal Devaraj as Sagar
- Radhika Pandit as Kajal
- Sanjjana as Jennifer
- Haripriya as Priyanka
- Dev Gill as Sonu
- Vinaya Prasad
- Avinash as Rajashekara Murthy
- Sharath Lohitashwa
- Sangeetha
- Ganesh Rao Kesarkar
- Suresh Anchan
- Adi Lokesh
- Kaddipudi Chandru

== Soundtrack ==
Sagar

Soundtrack album by Gurukiran
- Genre: Feature film soundtrack
- Label: Anand Audio

Gurukiran has composed the songs to the lyrics of Kaviraj. The Audio has been distributed by Anand Audio.

Track #	Song	Singer(s)	Duration
1	"Modale Yeke Sigalilla"	Sonu Nigam	05:21
2	"Koli Kodagana Nungitha"	Naveen, Chaitra H. G.	04:50
3	"Ondu Early Morning"	Shamitha Malnad, Rajesh Krishnan	03:36
4	"Bikeu Hattidare"	Gurukiran, Shamitha Malnad, Anuradha Bhat	04:01
5	"Weekendu"	Rajesh Krishnan, Shamitha Malnad	03:34
6	"Kayyakki"	Anuradha Bhat, Hemanth Kumar	04:17

== Reception ==
The Times of India gave 3.5/5 stars and wrote "The director makes the narration interesting by bringing in a family sentimental track and ending the story with an excellent fighting sequence for the front benchers. It could have been trimmed by at least 20 minutes to make it compact." B S Srivani from Deccan Herald concluded it as a "A frothy entertainer at its best". India Today wrote "While the fights and three songs are good, the inclusion of some unnecessary sequences in the second half drags the film. Even the story does not offer any freshness, but the production values makes the film much attractive. The comedy portions in the film are weak, but the song picturisations are a strong attraction of the film".
