= Krishnan Love Story =

2010 Indian action drama film

- Theatrical poster
- Directed by: Shashank
- Screenplay by: Shashank
- Story by: Shashank
- Produced by: Uday K. Mehta; Mohan G. Nayak
- Starring: Ajay Rao; Radhika Pandit; Pradeep
- Cinematography: Shekar Chandra
- Edited by: K. M. Prakash
- Music by: Sridhar V. Sambhram
- Production company: Sri Venkateshwara Krupa Enterprises
- Release date: 18 June 2010
- Running time: 147 minutes
- Country: India
- Language: Kannada

Krishnan Love Story is a 2010 Indian Kannada-language romantic drama film directed by Shashank and stars Ajay Rao, Radhika Pandit in the lead roles, alongside Umashri, Achyuth Kumar, Sharan, Pradeep, Harsha and Kaddipudi Chandru in supporting roles. The music was composed by Sridhar V. Sambhram.

Krishnan Love Story was released on 18 June 2010 to positive reviews from critics and became a box office success. The film was remade in Bengali in 2018 as Piya Re by Surinder Films.

== Cast ==
- Ajay Rao as Krishna
- Radhika Pandit as Geetha
- Umashree
- Achyuth Kumar
- Sharan
- Pradeep Bogadi as Narendra
- Pavan Benaka
- P. N. Sathya
- Rithesh
- Kempegowda
- Master Rakesh
- Shille Manjunath
- Harsha
- Ashok rao
- Kaddipudi Chandru as Chandru, Geetha's brother
- Shashank
- Padmaja Rao
- Lakshmi Hegde
- Ninasam Ashwath
- Jadi Akash
- Yogesh; special appearance in "Mosa Madalendu Neenu"

== Soundtrack ==
Krishnan Love Story

Soundtrack album by Sridhar V. Sambhram
- Released: 11 June 2010
- Genre: Feature film soundtrack
- Length: 32:42
- Label: Anand Audio

Sridhar V. Sambhram composed the film's background score and music for its soundtrack. The lyrics for the soundtrack was written by V. Sridhar, Yogaraj Bhat, Jayant Kaikini and Shashank. The album consists of eight tracks.

Track listing
No.	Title	Lyrics	Singer(s)	Length
1.	"Galli Cricket"	V. Sridhar	Desmond Louis, V. Sridhar	3:16
2.	"Thumba Aaramagi"	Yogaraj Bhat	Harsha Sadananda, Anoop Seelin, V. Sridhar	3:46
3.	"Hrudayave Bayaside Ninnane"	Jayant Kaikini	Sonu Nigam, Vidyashree	4:13
4.	"Mosa Madalende Neenu"	Shashank	Kailash Kher, Chetan Sosca	5:12
5.	"Mosa Madalende Neenu (Bit)"	Shashank	Kailash Kher	1:35
6.	"Ondu Sanna Aasege"	Shashank	Deepak Doddera	4:30
7.	"Nee Adada Maathu"	Jayant Kaikini	Anuradha Bhat	5:05
8.	"Nee Adada Maathu"	Jayant Kaikini	Rajesh Krishnan	5:05
Total length:				32:42

== Reception ==
=== Critical response ===
The Times of India gave 4/5 stars and wrote "With excellent screenplay and brilliant narration, director Shashank has chosen an emotionally-filled romantic story." Shruti Indira Lakshminarayana of Rediff gave 3/5 stars and wrote "Krishnan Love Story is worth a one time watch." B S Srivani from Deccan Herald wrote "Krishnan Love Story is the perfect tale for the current monsoon." Bangalore Mirror wrote "Shashank manages to create interesting characters, but the room for them to grow remains limited. He pays great attention to character details, but fails to bring them together in the right proportions."

== Box office ==
The film opened to a good response and ran successfully across Karnataka. It has completed 150 days.

== Awards ==
Award	Category	Recipient	Result	Ref.
58th Filmfare Awards South	Best Actress	Radhika Pandit	Won	
58th Filmfare Awards South	Best Supporting Actress	Umashree	Won	
58th Filmfare Awards South	Best Director	Shashank	Nominated	
58th Filmfare Awards South	Best Music Director	V. Sridhar	Nominated	
58th Filmfare Awards South	Best Male Playback Singer	Sonu Nigam for "Hrudayave"	Nominated	
58th Filmfare Awards South	Best Lyricist	Jayanth Kaikini for "Hrudayave"	Nominated	
