= Radhika Pandit =

Indian actress (born 1984)

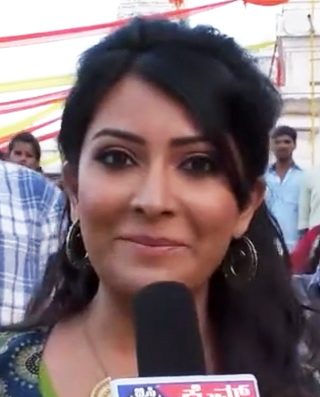
- Pandit in 2018
- Born: 7 March 1984 (age 42); Bangalore, Karnataka, India
- Occupation: Actress
- Years active: 2007–2019
- Spouse: Yash (m. 2016)
- Children: 2

Radhika Krishnaprasad Pandit (Note: See her business filings of entities controlled by her and her husband Yash.) (born 7 March 1984) is an Indian actress who primarily works in Kannada films. Considered among the leading and highest paid Kannada actresses, Pandit is a recipient of several accolades including three Filmfare Awards South, one Karnataka State Film Award and one SIIMA Award.

After working in television series such as Nandagokula (2007) and Sumangali (2007), Pandit made her feature film debut with Moggina Manasu (2008), for which she won the Karnataka State Film Award for Best Actress and Filmfare Award for Best Actress – Kannada. She received two more Filmfare Best Actress Award for her performances in the romantic dramas — Love Guru (2009) and Krishnan Love Story (2010).

Pandit established herself as a leading South Indian actress with commercial successes such as Hudugaru (2011), Addhuri (2012), Drama (2012), Bahaddur (2014), Mr & Mrs Ramachari (2014), which earned her the SIIMA Award for Best Actress – Kannada, and Doddmane Hudga (2016). The 2019 film Aadi Lakshmi Puraana marked her last screen appearance after which she took a long break from acting.

Pandit is also a celebrity endorser for several brands and products. She is married to actor Yash with whom she has two children.

== Early life and work ==
Radhika Pandit was born in Bangalore Palace Nursing Home into a Konkani-speaking Chitrapur Saraswat Brahmin family of Krishna Pandit, who is a stage and film personality. They lived in the Malleswaram suburb of Bangalore. Pandit has a younger brother, Gourang. She grew up in her paternal grandfather's house in Malleswaram and continues to live there for "sentimental reasons" as he "had bought the house with all the money he had saved."

Pandit did her schooling at Cluny Convent High School in Bangalore and later pursued a Bachelor of Commerce (B.Com.) course at Mount Carmel College, Bangalore. She aspired to become a teacher after completing a Master of Business Administration course. However, in 2007, during her final year in B.Com., she was persuaded by a friend to audition for a role in a Kannada language television serial, Nandagokula, directed by Ashok Kashyap. Pandit was offered the role without an audition. The same year, she appeared in another soap, Sumangali. When the former neared completion, her photos began circulating in local magazines, which were noticed by film director Shashank who was looking for a female lead for his film 18th Cross, and the makers of Moggina Manasu. She was cast in both films and began filming for the former first.

== Career ==
=== Breakthrough and success (2008–2011) ===
Radhika faced the camera for the first time in films with the Kannada film 18th Cross in 2007. The film was temporarily stalled following its producer Chikkana's death, only to release theatrically in 2012. This was when she began filming with Moggina Manasu. She was cast as Chanchala, a college-going teenage girl, who with her three friends are faced with problems of ragging and irksome boyfriends. She was paired opposite Yash, who she had previously worked with, in the soap Nandagokula. Released in 2008, Moggina Manasu emerged as a critical success and Pandit's performance received critical acclaim. The reviewer for Rediff.com wrote, "Newcomer Radhika Pandit shines among the four, and is bound to go places." She won the Karnataka State Film Award for Best Actress and Filmfare Award for Best Actress.

Radhika's next role was in the Nagathihalli Chandrashekhar-directed romantic-drama Olave Jeevana Lekkachaara (2009), a film that deals with the deviousness of pseudo-intellectuals. She was cast as Rukmini opposite Balachandra (played by Srinagar Kitty), who cheats her under the influence of the misguidance of a pseudo-revolutionary lecturer. G. S. Kumar of The Times of India called her performance "classic and lively". Her second release of 2009 was Love Guru, a romantic-drama film dealing with unrequited love and misunderstandings in a corporate setting. She which she was cast as Kushi opposite Tarun Chandra in the film. Critics acclaimed her performance and called her "one of the best actresses to appear on the marquee in the recent times." G. S. Kumar wrote, "Radhika Pandit steals the show with her brilliant expressions, lively action and excellent dialogue delivery." She won her second Filmfare Award for Best Actress.

In her first release of 2010, Krishnan Love Story, Pandit collaborated with the director Shashank for the second time after Moggina Manasu. It film saw her play the role of Geetha, a happy-go-lucky girl belonging to a lower-middle-class family, who, for want of money suppresses her ambitions. Shruti Indira Lakshminarayana of Rediff.com wrote of her performance, "Radhika does a detour from her glam city girl image, but it is hard to miss the sophistication in her. She however comes out with a good performance in the second half." With the film, Radhika won her third Filmfare Award for Best Actress along with other awards. In Gaana Bajaana, she portrayed Radha, who gets involved in a romantic love triangle with Krish and Kuttappa (played by Tarun Chandra and Dileep Raj). On her performance, Y. Maheswara Reddy of The New Indian Express wrote that she "walks away with all honours." Pandit next appeared in a comedy-drama film, Hudugaru, a remake of the Tamil film, Naadodigal, in a brief role. She was cast as the only female lead alongside three parallel male lead characters. She played Gayathri, a foodie, the love interest of Prabhu (played by Puneeth Rajkumar). Her performance won her, her fourth Filmfare Award for Best Actress nomination.

=== Established actress and stardom (2012–2016) ===
The year 2012 saw theatrical releases of six of her films. In the first, Alemari, a drama film based on real-life incidents, she portrayed the role of Neeli, a girl from a middle-class family who falls in love with Mohan, a milkman (played by Yogesh). Of her performance, IBNLive wrote, "Radhika Pandit is as brilliant as ever with her plain Jane looks and high voltage performance in emotional sequences." In Breaking News, a film that deals with commercialisation of the media industry, she played the role of Shraddha, the cheerful daughter of the Karnataka Lokayukta, who intends on fooling around with a journalist, played by Ajay Rao. The film opened to mixed reviews, however, Pandit's performance received praise. Rediff.com wrote, "It is Radhika Pandit's superb and light-hearted performance that livens up the proceedings." In her next release, Addhuri, a romance film, she was paired opposite debutant Dhruva Sarja. The film and Pandit's performance received positive reviews from critics. India Today wrote, "[Pandit] ... has once again proved why she is regarded as one of the awesome talents in the industry. She charms the young hearts, but at the same time can make the audience emotional with her performances." The performance fetched Pandit her fifth Filmfare Award for Best Actress nomination among others.

Pandit's first film, 18th Cross released in August 2012, received mixed reviews; however, critics praised her performance in the role of Punya, the love interest of Jeeva (played by Deepak), who gets wrongly implicated in a murder case, framed by an underworld don. The Times of India wrote of her performance, "Radhika Pandit hasn't changed much since her debut movie and has given an excellent performance." She was cast as Kajal in her next film, Sagar, opposite Prajwal Devaraj, alongside Haripriya and Sanjjanaa, a film that critics, a "commercial entertainer". Daily News and Analysis praised Pandit's performance in the film and wrote that she "walks away with the honours." Her final release of 2012 was Yogaraj Bhat's Drama, a comedy film that featured an ensemble cast of Pandit alongside Yash, Sathish Ninasam and Sindhu Lokanath, the former three of whom play students of a government-owned degree college. The film and Pandit's performance as Nandini earned unanimous praise from critics. IBNLive wrote, "Radhika Pandit is superb as a performer and her beautiful looks and style have added a special charm to the film." She also co-sang a track, "Drama Hitavachana" in the film, which featured her rapping in parts.

In Kaddipudi, Pandit was cast as Uma, a junior artiste in films, opposite Kaddipudi (played by Shiva Rajkumar), a former underworld don who tries to renounce a life of violence, but in vain. Her performance as a girl from a poor family having lost her parents and living with her grandmother, and playing the love interest of Kaddipudi was received well. Muralidhara Khajane of The Hindu wrote, "Radhika Pandit excels and puts in a mature performance and brings dignity to the character." In her second release of 2013, she was cast opposite Sumanth Shailendra in Dilwala, a romantic film that opened to largely negative reviews. Pandit's performance was however praised by critics and she received her second nomination of SIIMA Award of Best Actress. She next starred in the romance film, Bahaddur as Anjali, the love interest of Ashok (played by Druva Sarja), a descendant of a royal family. G. S. Kumar wrote that she "wins your heart with her brilliant expressions and dialogue delivery." Despite having received mixed reviews, the film turned out to be a commercial success. Santhosh Ananddram's Mr & Mrs Ramachari saw Pandit work with Yash for the third time. She was cast as the girlfriend of a stubborn brat, played by Yash, who idolises actor Vishnuvardhan and has an easygoing attitude towards life. Kumar felt that Pandit delivered a "winsome performance". The film emerged as a massive commercial success and won her the SIIMA Award for Best Actress – Kannada.

In her only release of 2015, the romance-thriller Endendigu, Pandit, paired opposite Ajay Rao for the third time, played the role of his wife with schizophrenic tendencies who foresees his death among other dreams. The film received mixed reviews, with her performance receiving praise. In the comedy Zoom, her first release of 2016, she played Nayana, an employee with an advertising agency who believes in doing her work with integrity and ethics. After an initial run-in, she falls for an employee of the rival agency. The film received mixed reviews from critics; Archana Nathan of The Hindu felt the film "was filled with crass double entendre jokes", and wrote that Pandit "can barely do much in the role she has been given." She was cast opposite Puneeth Rajkumar in Doddmane Hudga, a film centered around his character set in Hubli. Of Pandit's role, A. Sharadhaa of The New Indian Express wrote that she "adds measured amounts of ludic spirit and her double shaded character is carried out with much flair. She making unintentional mistakes in speaking the local language is entertaining." Later that year, she played Ananya in Santhu Straight Forward, pursuing a degree in architecture and compelled to commit to marry her cousin following a family tragedy. S. Viswanath of Deccan Herald felt that the film was "the film is watchable" only "due to the magnetic presence of Radhika Pandit" and added that "she lets her expressive eyes and silence eloquently speak about her distraught state." Thus with various role, she is counted among the most popular Kannada actress of all time and has won many accolades for her starring roles.

=== Later work and hiatus (2017–2019) ===
After her marriage with actor Yash, she took a long break from acting to focus on her personal life. Pandit's only appearance was in the 2019 film Aadi Lakshmi Puraana. A. Sharadhaa from The New Indian Express noted, "Radhika Pandit, plays a role completely different for her, but she does it with ease."

== Personal life ==
In a 2010 interview with The New Indian Express, she said that she, however, loves visiting the Chitrapur Math in Uttara Kannada, as she "feel[s] good after spending some time" and "believe[s] there are positive vibrations there. Pandit met actor Yash for the first time at the sets of her tele-serial Nandagokula in 2007. They began dating after having worked together in films, but kept their relationship private for years and away from the attention of media, and were engaged in August 2016. They married in December in a private ceremony in Bangalore. They have two children.

== Off-screen work ==
Post-marriage, Pandit participated in the work of Yasho Marga Foundation, a foundation started by her and Yash that aims to "extend a helping hand" to "farmers and the labourers". They have helped in rejuvenating the lakes in parts of Karnataka including Koppal and Shivamogga.

Between 2013 and 2014, Pandit and Puneeth Rajkumar worked as brand ambassadors for Right to education in Karnataka, having been chosen by Sarva Shiksha Abhiyan. In addition to this, she has endorsed brands in the past such as KLF Nirmal Coconut oil and Gillette's Shave India Movement.

== Artistry and public image ==
Pandit is considered among the highest-paid and versatile actresses in Kannada cinema. She has often been cited by the media as the most popular actresses in Sandalwood. She is also one of the most followed Kannada actress on Instagram. Pandit spoke about her choice of roles and films in an interview. She added,

"I had talent to offer and wanted to be known as a good performer. I made sure I took up films that did justice to my talent and was in line with my goals. Working with good teams made it possible to stay strong in the industry without getting involved in any controversy. I completely value this industry, which has given me name and fame."

On Pandit's successful career, Vivek M V of Deccan Herald stated, "There are multiple reasons for Radhika's success. Her expressive eyes are hard not to like. Apart from oozing grace in roles that had serious undertones, she has the face to effortlessly star in glamorous frolics." Rediff.com has named her in its "Top 5 Kannada Actress" list. She was placed third in 2009, and first in 2010 and 2012. Rediff.com further termed her as one of the "most captivating faces" in Kannada industry. Pandit was placed in The Times of India's "Top Sandalwood Actresses" list, of 2012 and 2013. In its Bangalore Times Most Desirable Women list, she was placed 17th in 2012, 5th in 2016, 12th in 2017 and 2018, and 15th in 2019.

== Filmography ==
=== Films ===
Key
†	Denotes films that have not yet been released

Year	Title	Role	Notes	Ref.
2008	Moggina Manasu	Chanchala	Debut film role	
2009	Olave Jeevana Lekkachaara	Rukmini		
2009	Love Guru	Kushi		
2010	Krishnan Love Story	Geetha		
2010	Gaana Bajaana	Radha "Radhe"		
2011	Hudugaru	Gayathri		
2012	Alemari	Neeli		
2012	Breaking News	Shraddha		
2012	Addhuri	Poorna		
2012	18th Cross	Punya		
2012	Sagar	Kajal		
2012	Drama	Nandini	Also playback singer for "Drama Hitavachana"	
2013	Kaddipudi	Uma		
2013	Dilwala	Preethi		
2014	Bahaddur	Anjali		
2014	Mr & Mrs Ramachari	Divya / Margaret "Margie" (Note: Pandit played a single character with two or more names)		
2015	Endendigu	Jyothi		
2016	Zoom	Naina	Also playback singer for "Hey Diwana"	
2016	Doddmane Hudga	Usha / Nisha		
2016	Santhu Straight Forward	Ananya "Anu"		
2019	Aadi Lakshmi Puraana	Lakshmi		
2019	My Santa	Lakshmi	Malayalam film	

=== Television ===
Year	Title	Role	Ref.
2004-2007	Kadambari	N/A	
2005	Nanda Gokula		
2006-2007	Sumangali	Suman	

== Accolades ==
Year	Work	Award	Category	Result	Ref.
2009	Moggina Manasu	56th Filmfare Awards South	Best Actress – Kannada	Won	
2010	Moggina Manasu	Karnataka State Film Awards	Best Actress	Won	
2010	Olave Jeevana Lekkachaara	Suvarna Film Awards	Most Popular Actress	Nominated	
2010	Olave Jeevana Lekkachaara	Suvarna Film Awards	Star Pair of the Year (Note: Shared with Srinagar Kitty)	Won	
2010	Love Guru	57th Filmfare Awards South	Best Actress – Kannada	Won	
2010	Love Guru	South Scope Cine Awards	Best Actress	Nominated	
2011	Krishnan Love Story	BIG Kannada Entertainment Awards	Most Entertaining Actress of the Year	Won	
2011	Krishnan Love Story	Suvarna Film Awards	Best Actress	Won	
2011	Krishnan Love Story	58th Filmfare Awards South	Best Actress – Kannada	Won	
2011	Krishnan Love Story	Udaya Film Awards	Best Actress	Won	
2012	Hudugaru	TV9 Sandalwood Star Awards	Best Actress	Nominated	
2012	Hudugaru	59th Filmfare Awards South	Best Actress – Kannada	Nominated	
2012	Hudugaru	The Bangalore Times Film Awards	Best Actress	Nominated	
2012	Hudugaru	Suvarna Film Awards	Favorite Heroine	Nominated	
2013	Drama	Suvarna Film Awards	Favorite Heroine	Won	
2013	Addhuri	60th Filmfare Awards South	Best Actress – Kannada	Nominated	
2013	Addhuri	Udaya Film Awards	Best Actress	Won	
2013	Addhuri	2nd South Indian International Movie Awards	Best Actress – Kannada	Nominated	
2013	Addhuri	The Bangalore Times Film Awards	Best Actress	Nominated	
2014	Dilwala	3rd South Indian International Movie Awards	Best Actress – Kannada	Nominated	
2015	Mr & Mrs Ramachari	62nd Filmfare Awards South	Best Actress – Kannada	Nominated	
2015	Mr & Mrs Ramachari	4th South Indian International Movie Awards	Best Actress – Kannada	Won	
2016	Mr & Mrs Ramachari	1st IIFA Utsavam	Best Actress – Kannada	Won	
2016	Endendigu	5th South Indian International Movie Awards	Best Actress – Kannada	Nominated	
2025	—N/a	Chittara Star Awards	Star Icon – Female	Pending	
