= 18th Cross =

- Directed by: Shanker
- Produced by: Rathna Chikkanna
- Starring: Deepak; Radhika Pandit
- Cinematography: P L Ravi; Suresh Babu
- Edited by: Thirupathi Reddy
- Music by: Arjun Janya
- Release date: 3 August 2012
- Country: India
- Language: Kannada

18th Cross is a 2012 Indian Kannada-language film directed by Shanker and Produced by Rathna Chikkanna, starring Deepak and Radhika Pandit in lead roles.

== Cast ==
- Deepak as Jeevan
- Radhika Pandit as Punya
- Ramakrishna
- Kari Subbu as Benne Krishna
- Vinaya Prasad
- Jeeva as Inspector Kote
- Girish
- Bullet Prakash as Prakasha
- Vasthu Venkatesh
- Chiranjeevi
- Danny
- John

== Music ==
18th Cross

Soundtrack album by Arjun Janya
- Released: 6 July 2012
- Recorded: 2012
- Genre: Feature film soundtrack
- Length: 26:34
- Language: Kannada

Official audio
- 18th Cross - Full Album on YouTube

Track listing
No.	Title	Singer(s)	Length
1.	"Naanyaaro"	Haricharan	5:44
2.	"Potko Potko"	Arjun Janya	6:20
3.	"Priya Sakhi"	Srinivasan, Sujatha	3:58
4.	"Suriyo Suriyo"	K. S. Chithra, Tippu	6:02
5.	"Thirugi Thirugi Noode Jaane"	Karthik	5:10
Total length:			25:28

== Reception ==
A critic from The Times of India scored the film at 2.5 out of 5 stars and wrote "Radhika Pandith hasn’t changed much since her debut movie and has given an excellent performance. Equally good is Deepak. Music by Arjun is quite good. Cinematography by PL Ravi lacks punch". B S Srivani from Deccan Herald wrote "It’s well-fleshed out and highly relevant. Or is it? To an audience that’s overexposed to a regular dose of similar stories, this film is yet another ho-hum affair. A tight narrative, reasonable performances, camerawork and splendid music fail to keep up with an audience that looks for escapist entertainment and instant gratification — a pity, really". A critic from News18 India wrote "The first half is slightly better, but the second half is full of gory violence and tragedy-filled sequences. The film fails to engage the audience in the second half. Vinaya Prasad and Ramakrishna have performed their roles with ease. Janya has composed two lovely tunes for the film, 'Thirugi Thirugi' and 'Modhala minchu' are melodious numbers. Overall, an average fare". A critic from Bangalore Mirror wrote "Now we know that Radhika was a good actress from her very first film and Deepak was still learning in his second. Veteran Ramakrishna is seen in a big enough role after a while and Bullet Prakash does not have a role that requires him to monkey around. The director has managed to break stereotypes here. In a nutshell, the film is good, but not compelling enough".
