= Chukkallo Chandrudu =

- Movie Poster
- Directed by: Siva Ananth
- Screenplay by: Siddharth; Siva Ananth; Kona Venkat (also dialogues)
- Story by: Siddharth
- Produced by: Alexander Vallabha; K. S. Rama Rao (presents)
- Starring: Akkineni Nageswara Rao; Siddharth; Sadha; Charmme Kaur; Saloni Aswani
- Cinematography: Sameer Reddy; Abhik Mukhopadhyay
- Edited by: A. Sreekar Prasad
- Music by: Chakri
- Production company: Creative Commercials
- Release date: 14 January 2006
- Running time: 147 minutes
- Country: India
- Language: Telugu

Chukkallo Chandrudu (transl. Moon among the stars) is a 2006 Indian Telugu-language romance film directed by Siva Ananth in his directorial debut It is produced by Alexander Vallabha for Creative Commercials. The film stars Akkineni Nageswara Rao, Siddharth, Sadha, Charmme Kaur and Saloni Aswani. The music is composed by Chakri. Siddharth also co-wrote the screenplay. Many scenes of this movie were shot in exotic locations around Innsbruck city, Austria. Chukkallo Chandrudu opened to critical acclaim, however due to competition from other successful Sankranti releases such as Lakshmi, Style, and Devadasu, it emerged as a commercial failure at the box office. The film was remade in Kannada as Sagar (2012).

== Plot ==
The film begins in Germany, where Arjun, a joyful NRI, lives with his millionaire grandparents, Krishna Rao & Padmavati. For a long time, Padmavati has wanted to witness Arjun's wedlock. Arjun detests it because he firmly believes he will lose everything he loves. Tragically, she died one morning and Krishna Rao was devastated as he could not fulfill his wife's last wish. Though he seeks to convince Arjun, he does not reciprocate. Ergo, Krishna Rao quits, and Arjun finds his whereabouts in their native village. He proceeds to where Krishna Rao states to retrieve if he splices. Then, Arjun walks on by, promising to return with his spouse.

Now he starts his quest aiding his baby buddy Puppy by selecting three women: Shalini, Sravani, and Sandhya, his childhood mates. Shalini is a tennis star, Shravani is a medico, and Sandhya is a women's activist. Currently, he develops intimacy with the three, introduced as a commoner Krishna, and they become pretty close to him. It throws him into a dichotomy when Krishna Rao affirms him to quest for true love as it's unique from liking. Firstly, he picks Sandhya and attempts to express her illogically. Being haughty, she rudely replies when Arjun calls her a tomboy and receives a slap. Next, he draws Shalini when he gets a phone from her airport. Arjun rushes but gets disappointed, knowing she is moving to Switzerland for a tournament and has a boyfriend. Simultaneously, he answers the phone of Shravani, who states her grandmother is severe and admitted to the hospital. So, Arjun lands therein, provides moral support to her, and covertly aids financially, too, when Shravani genuinely endears him.

Just before she conveys it, Arjun again picks up the phone from Shalini, who divulges that she has teased him. Thus, he flies to Switzerland when Shalini throws the tournament to spend time with him. That night, Prakash, Shalini's father, had outbursts that Shalini would quit the game, throwing crores of men into grief. Arjun also feels sorry for his selfish thinking. So, he backs, quoting Shalini that she should remain as an ideal, revealing his identity.

At which is aware of Shravani's engagement with an NRI. Indeed, the bridegroom forges as the helper for her grandmother's survival. Presently, Arjun completely fails and seeks an apology from Krishna Rao when he provides an idea for choosing proposals from a list. At that moment, Sandhya detects him as her childhood mate and proposes to him, which he accepts. During the bachelor party, Arjun meets Sarath, Sandhya's ex-lover, when he discerns his liking towards Sandhya even today. Thus, Arjun reunites them, convincing Sandhya. Parallelly, Arjun visits Shravani's wedding, where, overhearing the bridegroom's hellish hue, he punches him, and a brawl erupts. Krishna Rao attends the venue when Shravani asks for Arjun and spots badly hurt Arjun as Krishna. Plus, she gets knowledge of his true self, who is the actual helpmate. At last, the two embrace and get nuptials. Finally, the movie ends happily, with the newly wedded couple settling down in Germany with Krishna Rao.

== Cast ==
- Akkineni Nageswara Rao as Krishna Rao, Arjun's grandfather
- Siddharth as Arjun / Krishna
- Sadha as Shravani, Arjun's love interest later wife
- Charmy as Sandhya
- Saloni as Shalini Rao
- Sunil as Puppy, Arjun's friend
- Prathap K. Pothan as Prakash, Shalini's father
- Tanikella Bharani as Shravani's uncle
- Ahuti Prasad as Lakshman Rao, Sandhya's father
- Kondavalasa as Pothe Babu Rao
- K. R. Vijaya as Shravani's grandmother
- Sana as Shravani's aunt
- Mounica as Shravani's sister
- Waheeda Rehman as Padmavathi, Krishna Rao's wife, Arjun's grandmother
- Prabhu Deva as Sharath, Sandhya's love interest

== Soundtrack ==
Chukkallo Chandrudu

Soundtrack album by Chakri
- Released: 2006
- Genre: Soundtrack
- Length: 33:47
- Label: Maruthi Music
- Producer: Chakri

Chakri chronology
Party (2006)	Chukkallo Chandrudu (2006)	Devadasu (2006)

Music composed by Chakri.

No.	Title	Lyrics	Singer(s)	Length
1.	"Everybody"	Surendra Krishna	Simha, Shaan, Siddharth	5:15
2.	"Edhalo Eppudo"	Bhaskarabhatla	Siddharth, Kousalya	5:22
3.	"Preme Paravasham"	Bhaskarabhatla	Karthik, Chinmayi	4:24
4.	"Dolna Dolna"	Bhaskarabhatla	Sukhwinder Singh	5:27
5.	"Navvutho Ringtone"	Kandikonda	Kunal Ganjawala, Kousalya	4:16
6.	"Kalanaina"	Bhashasri	Karthik, Harini	4:55
7.	"Pichchi Prema"	Pothula Ravikiran	Chakri, Vasu	4:15
Total length:				33:47

== Release ==
A critic from The Hindu gave a positive review and noted that "Siddharth excels in all the departments and shows good comedy timing. Saloni, Charmme and Sada do justice to their roles. After a long time, Akkineni [Nageswara Rao] comes to the big screen and even matches the dancing steps along with the hero. Music by Chakri is enthralling while choreography is good". Jeevi of Idlebrain gave the film rating of 3.25 out of 5 and wrote that "Producer Alexander Vallabha should be appreciated for making his debut with a film that defies the routine formula. On a whole, Chukkallo Chandrudu is a sophisticated comedy film for multiplex crowds". Full Hyderabad gave a positive review and opined that "This is an enjoyable movie that provides a good time for the family. Middle-aged cynics will need an extra dose of patience, but who knows, it may even touch their romantic buttons".
