= Krantiveera Sangolli Rayanna (2012 film) =

Sangolli Rayanna
- Theatrical release poster
- Directed by: Naganna
- Written by: Keshavaditya; Naganna
- Based on: Life of Sangolli Rayanna
- Produced by: Anand Appugol
- Starring: Darshan; Jaya Prada; Shashi Kumar; Nikita Thukral
- Narrated by: Sudeepa
- Cinematography: Ramesh Babu
- Edited by: Govardhan
- Music by: Yashovardhan; Hari Krishna
- Production company: Sri Sangolli Rayanna films
- Release date: 1 November 2012
- Country: India
- Language: Kannada
- Box office: ₹30–40 crore

Krantiveera Sangolli Rayanna ( transl. Revolutionary warrior Sangolli Rayanna) is a 2012 Indian Kannada-language historical action film directed by Naganna and produced by Anand Appugol. Darshan, Jaya Prada and Nikita Thukral play prominent roles. The film is about Sangolli Rayanna, a prominent freedom fighter from Karnataka, who fought the East India Company till he was captured and executed by hanging in 1831.

The film was released on 1 November 2012 coinciding with the Karnataka Rajyotsava where it received positive reviews from critics and became a box office success.

Kranti Veera Sangolli Rayanna was produced at an estimated cost of Rs 30 and collected approximately ₹30 crore in 25 days of screening and ₹40 crore in 75 days in theatres in Karnataka. and became the highest-grossing Kannada movie of 2012.

== Premise ==
A respectable village head decides to keep his son away from the violent politics of rural life. However, fate intervenes, forcing the young man to not only return home, but also take up the sickle. Sangolli Rayanna, a military leader fought against the Britishers, He served as a senior commander in the military of Kittur ruled by Kittur Chennamma, the kingdom - like many others - called by the British as a princely state, during the early 19th century. After Chennamma led a failed rebellion against the British East India Company (EIC) in response to the EIC's infamous Doctrine of Lapse in 1824, Rayanna continued to resist Company rule in India. After leading another uprising against EIC authority, he was ultimately captured by the British and executed by hanging in 1831.

== Cast ==
- Darshan as Sangolli Rayanna
- Jayapradha as Kittur Rani Chennamma
- Nikita Thukral as Mallavva
- Divya Parameshwaran
- Shashikumar as Channabasava
- Srinivasa Murthy as Veerappa Sardar
- Jai Jagadish as Venkanagouda
- Avinash as Balappa Kulkarni
- Ramesh Bhat
- Umashree as Kenchamma
- Karibasavaiah as Pakira
- Doddanna as Venkata Rao
- Satyajith as Mallappa Shetty
- Shobhraj as Bandari Baboo
- Bank Janardhan as Linganagouda
- Saurav
- Sadashiv Brahmavara
- Anand Appugol as King of Shivagatti
- Sadashiv Vinaysarathi
- Rajesh Nataranga as Krishnaroo
- Dharma
- Ravichetan
- Moogu Suresh

== Production ==
=== Casting ===
Initially, Arjun Sarja was selected for the lead role which is being portrayed by Darshan. and Priyamani was named previously for the female lead role, but later she refused the offer to do such historical character. Finally, Nikita Thukral was offered the lead role. For shooting purpose, a white horse was bought which cost nearly ₹1.7 million (US$18,000). Jaya Prada portrayed the role of Kittur Chennamma. The same role was originally portrayed by B. Saroja Devi in the 1961 Kannada historical biopic Kittur Chennamma (film).

=== Filming ===
The team was filmed in Jaipur (Rajasthan) with more than a thousand artists, including horses and elephants. The production team shot for 40 days in a desert village called Thula to capture the battle scene. Fake human body parts were designed by Rajasthan artists for the war scenes to make the war sequences look real.

Producer Anand Appugol explained the shooting experience to the press. "It cost more than ₹5 million (US$52,000) per day of shooting and cost around ₹20 million (US$210,000) only for war scenes. Jaya Prada, who appears as Kittur Chennamma spent 30 days with the team". She said, "I have acted in nearly 700 films. But I haven’t seen a rich film like this ever shot in the south". Producer Appugol said about his favorite star, "Darshan Thoogudeep was totally involved in the character of Sangolli Rayanna while filming the scenes".

Film posters were nominated for the Internet Poster Design Award.

In the war field, 30 elephants, hundreds of horses, thousands of soldiers, 320 fighters from Bangalore, Hyderabad, and Mumbai have taken part in some risky shots. Seven cameras, including the latest 500, fitting small cameras to the horses and heli-cam were pressed into action. Shooting in Murugod cave was another rich experience. The cave to the road level was used for five days shoot for the film. Twenty-five days were spent shooting on location in Mysuru.

Actor Srinivasa Murthy fell down from a speeding horse at Jaipur at the shooting spot, and he was saved by Darshan.

== Soundtrack ==
Sangolli Rayanna

Soundtrack album by Yashovardhan
- Released: 2012
- Recorded: 2012
- Genre: Feature film soundtrack
- Length: 32:38
- Language: Kannada

Official audio
- Sangolli Rayanna - Full Album on YouTube

Track listing
No.	Title	Singer(s)	Length
1.	"Malla Malla"	Sonu Nigam, Anuradha Bhat	5:06
2.	"Veera Bhoomi"	S. P. Balasubrahmanyam	4:59
3.	"Chinnadanta Aramane"	K. J. Yesudas	5:04
4.	"Gandu Mettida"	Shankar Mahadevan, Rajesh Krishnan, Hemanth Kumar	5:36
5.	"Nannede Veene"	K. S. Chitra, Sonu Nigam, Prakash Sontakke	5:53
6.	"Janani Janmabhoomi"	Shankar Mahadevan, Rajesh Krishnan, Nanditha, Hemanth Kumar, Prakash Sontakke	6:40
Total length:			32:38

== Reception ==
=== Critical response ===
A critic from The Times of India scored the film at 4 out of 5 stars and says "A highlight of the movie is powerful dialogues by T Keshavadithya. Cinematography by Rameshbabu and editing by Dipu S Kumar add to the gloss of the film". B S Srivani from Deccan Herald wrote "Ultimately, Sangolli Rayanna is one man’s passion realised with equal determination by others. That passion, in this case, is easily transferred to the viewer and set the cash box ringing. Kudos Keshavaditya and team". Srikanth Srinivasa from Rediff.com scored the film at 3 out of 5 stars and wrote "Though director Naganna could have done away with at least 25 -30 minutes of footage, it still manages to keep you engaged which is quite an achievement. There are a few flaws in documenting the period. Krantiveera Sangolli Rayanna is a must-see film for all. Rarely do historical films get made and this is a rare opportunity for people of this generation to watch such a movie". Shruti I L from DNA wrote "She plays the role of his mother and in true sense it is she and the well written dialogues that bring out the patriotism in you. And what better time than this Kannada Rajyotsava week to revel in its spirit, we wonder, more so if you are like Darshan!". A critic from Bangalore Mirror wrote "The film will definitely satisfy fans of Darshan. But it will certainly not pull in crowds that have deserted Kannada films in the recent years. It deserves to be watched by all people who are still watching Kannada films".

== Awards and nominations ==
Ceremony	Category	Nominee	Result	Ref(s)
60th Filmfare Awards South	Best Film	Anand B. Appugola	Won	
60th Filmfare Awards South	Best Director	Naganna	Nominated	
60th Filmfare Awards South	Best Actor	Darshan	Won	
60th Filmfare Awards South	Supporting Actor	Shivakumar	Nominated	
60th Filmfare Awards South	Supporting Actress	Jayapradha	Nominated	
2nd South Indian International Movie Awards	Best Film	Anand B. Appugola	Nominated	
2nd South Indian International Movie Awards	Best Director	Naganna	Nominated	
2nd South Indian International Movie Awards	Best Cinematographer	Ramesh Babu	Nominated	
2nd South Indian International Movie Awards	Best Actor	Darshan	Nominated	
2nd South Indian International Movie Awards	Best Fight Choreographer	Ravi Varma	Won	
2nd South Indian International Movie Awards	Best Debutant Producer	Ananda B. Appugola	Nominated	
2012 Karnataka State Film Awards	Karnataka State Film Award for Best Actor	Darshan	Won	
2012 Karnataka State Film Awards	Karnataka State Film Award for Best Family Entertainer	Anand B. Appugola	Won	
