= Kabaddi (2009 film) =

- Directed by: Narendra Babu
- Written by: Narendra Babu; Hu Pattanashetty
- Produced by: G Kishor Kumar; G K Ravi; K Raju; Anoop Gowda; N Asha; D V Rajendra Prasad
- Starring: Praveen; Priyanka; Kishore; Dharma
- Cinematography: Ananth Urs; Santhosh Vikramadithya
- Edited by: S. K. Nagendra Urs
- Music by: Hamsalekha
- Production company: Khandaya Haagu Vistara
- Release date: 3 July 2009
- Country: India
- Language: Kannada

Kabaddi is a 2009 Kannada sports drama film directed by Narendra Babu. It has music by Hamsalekha. The film stars Praveen and Priyanka in the lead roles. It features real life Kabaddi players as important roles, while veteran actor Kishore played the role of a passionate sports coach. The directorial debut film, is a love story based around the sport of Kabaddi. Though it didn't perform well at the box office, critics named it one of the top Kannada films of 2009.

At 2009 Karnataka State Film Awards, it won the award for Best First Film.

== Cast ==
- Praveen as Praveen
- Priyanka as Priyanka
- Kishore as Coach Beeresh
- Avinash
- Dharma as Venkatesh
- Sriraksha
- BC Ramesh

== Soundtrack ==
Kabaddi

Soundtrack album by Hamsalekha
- Released: 2009
- Genre: Film soundtrack
- Label: Akshaya Audio
- Producers: G. K. Ravi, K. Raju, G. Kishor Kumar, Anup Gowda, N. Asha, D. V. Rajendra Prasad

Song title	Singers
"Jhallanta Kaadutaalivalu"	Hariharan
"Toltede"	Shankar Mahadevan, Lakshmi Narayan
"Mutte Mutte"	K. S. Chithra, Karthik
"Bombe Maanava"	Kavita Seth, Harsha
"Preethi Maadiro"	Shreya Ghoshal, Kunal Ganjawala

== Reception ==
=== Critical response ===
This movie got mostly positive reviews from the media. R.G. Vijayasarathy of Hindustan Times wrote "Though he has selected many new artistes for the film, he has been able to extract good performances from them. The more experienced actors have portrayed their roles perfectly. The desi spirit of the game is seen throughout the film". Rediff.com scored the film at 4 out of 5 stars and says "Thattaythu, Jallantha are superbly composed and choreographed. Although five cinematographers have worked for the film, the camera work is top class. Kabaddi is a movie that cannot be missed. Go for it". Sify wrote "lyrics and music are very well scored. Though the camerawork is good, there is noticeable difference is different scenes and songs. No doubt five cameramen were used for different parts of the film. Watch the film and feel it grow on you". Bangalore Mirror wrote "Though the camerawork is good, there is noticeable difference in some of the scenes and songs. No doubt five cameramen were used for different parts of the film. Watch the film and feel it grow on you". A critic from The New Indian Express wrote "An added attraction for kabaddi lovers is to see kabaddi player BC Ramesh who was conferred with Arjun Award for his contribution to kabaddi in action. But it seems the director gave him more importance, than the protagonist in the climax. Audience would like to see the hero winning the game and not be out of action due to injuries. But overall, it is worth a watch". B S Srivani from Deccan Herald wrote "As for Praveen, it is difficult to ask him to straddle both sports and acting in future. A fine hero for such a story. Family viewing recommended".
