= Drama (2012 film) =

2012 Indian film by Yogaraj Bhat

- Directed by: Yogaraj Bhat
- Screenplay by: Ravikiran; Yogaraj Bhat
- Story by: Yogaraj Bhat
- Produced by: Jayanna; Bhogendra
- Starring: Yash; Radhika Pandit; Sathish Ninasam; Sindhu Lokanath
- Cinematography: S. Krishna
- Edited by: Sanath Kumar; Suresh Arumugam
- Music by: V. Harikrishna
- Production companies: Yogaraj Movies; Jayanna Combines
- Distributed by: Jayanna Combines & Tricolor Entertainment
- Release date: 23 November 2012
- Running time: 149 minutes
- Country: India
- Language: Kannada
- Budget: ₹4 crores
- Box office: est. ₹ 13 crores

Drama is a 2012 Indian Kannada-language romantic drama film written, directed and co-produced by Yogaraj Bhat under the banner Yogaraj Movies and Jayanna Combines. It stars Yash, Radhika Pandit, Sathish Ninasam and Sindhu Lokanath in leading roles and veteran actor Ambareesh in an extended cameo appearance.

Music for the film was scored by V. Harikrishna while lyrics for the soundtrack were written by the successful combination of Jayanth Kaikini and Yogaraj Bhat. Krishna was hired as the cinematographer for the film, who had previously worked with Bhat in the massively successful film, Mungaru Male.

== Cast ==
- Yash as Venkatesha
- Radhika Pandit as Nandini
- Sathish Ninasam as 'Kwatle' Satisha
- Sindhu Lokanath as Chandrika
- Sampath as D'Souza
- Suchendra Prasad as Shalivahana, college principal
- Malavika as Gayathri
- Lohithaswa as D'Souza's boss
- Achyuth Kumar as Venkatesha's father
- Rajashekhar Naidu
- Sai Mahesh
- M. S. Umesh
- Rockline Venkatesh
- Sangeetha
- Ravi Santhehaklu
- Bangalore Nagesh
- Abhinaya
- Kalyani Girish
- Mithra
- Honnavalli Krishna
- Rockline Sudhakar as Chandrika's father
- Hamsa as Ganga
- Ambareesh in a cameo appearance as Bulbul

== Production ==
After the moderate success of Paramathma, the last venture of Yogaraj Bhat, this was the second project for the production house, Jayanna Combines. Hindi and Marathi cinema actor Atul Kulkarni was picked for the negative role after Prakash Rai, who was the original choice for the role. He was again replaced by Tamil actor Sampath Raj. V Harikrishna scored the music and background score. S Krishna, who previously worked on Mungaru Male, conducted camera work. Drama is produced by Jayanna and Bhogendra.

== Soundtrack ==
The music of the film was composed by V. Harikrishna. The audio album was released in the end of September, 2012 and was well received. "Thundh Haikla Sahavasa" was a huge hit.

Drama
- Soundtrack cover

Soundtrack album by V. Harikrishna
- Released: September 2012
- Genre: Feature film soundtrack
- Label: Anand Audio
- Producer: V. Harikrishna

No.	Title	Singer(s)	Length
1.	"Thund Haikla Sahavasa"	Vijay Prakash	4:02
2.	"Chendutiya Pakkadali"	Sonu Nigam	5:30
3.	"Drama Hitavachana"	Tippu	4:25
4.	"Bombe Adsonu"	V. Harikrishna	4:36
5.	"Hambalada Hoovannu"	Sunitha Gopraju	3:58
6.	"Bombe Adsonu - Bit"	V. Harikrishna	2:43

== Awards ==
- Yogaraj Bhat - Won -Filmfare Award for Best Lyricist – Kannada category for the song 'Bombe Adsonu'.
- V. Harikrishna - Won -Filmfare Award for Best Music Director – Kannada category
- Sonu Nigam - Won -The Bangalore Times Film Awards for 'The Best Playback Singer Male' category for the song 'Chendutiya Pakkadali'.
- Yogaraj Bhat - Won -The Bangalore Times Film Awards for 'The Best Lyricist' category for the song 'Bombe Adsonu'.
- Sonu Nigam - Nominated -Filmfare Award for Best Male Playback Singer – Kannada category for the song 'Chendutiya Pakkadali'
- Nominated for Filmfare Award for Best Film – Kannada category
- Yash - Nominated for Filmfare Award for Best Actor – Kannada category
- Sindhu Lokanath -Nominated for Filmfare Award for Best Supporting Actress – Kannada category
- Nominated for The Bangalore Times Film Awards for 'The Best Film' category
- Nominated for The Bangalore Times Film Awards for 'The Best Youth Film' category
- V. Harikrishna - Nominated -The Bangalore Times Film Awards for 'The Best Singer Male' Category

== Critical reception ==
A critic from The Times of India scored the film at 3.5 out of 5 stars and says "Full marks to Yash for a lively performance. Radhika Pandit has done a neat job. V Harikrishna walks away with honours for his excellent numbers. Krishna’s cinematography is pleasing to the eye". Srikanth Srinivasa from Rediff.com wrote "Krishna's camera work is good while Harikrishna's music is a winner. The title song, Bombe aadisuvanu and Tundu Haikala Sawasa are already popular. Drama could have been a little more dramatic but is worth a watch for all the entertainment the young team gives us". Shruti I. L. from DNA wrote "Krishna’s cinematography also does justice to the script. This is one drama you would want to be a part of... but just make sure you don’t bunk your classes to do so as the film comes precisely with one such message". A critic from News18 India wrote "'Drama' is a film that genuine Kannada film audience can not miss. It may have its pitfalls, yet it bears the stamp of Yogaraj Bhat's talents. Watch it!". A critic from The Hindu wrote "Bhat has tried his best to please both the classes and masses with homilies, stereotypes, emotions, suspense and scenic locales. A bit more effort on his part and he would come up with a satisfying thriller. Though the first half meanders, the narration picks up in the second half enough to be compelling. Drama unfolds within".

== Box office ==
Drama got a good opening upon release. The film completing 100 days of run and grossing ₹13 Crore against its ₹4 Crore budget and was declared as a Blockbuster.

== Accolades ==
Ceremony	Category	Nominee	Result
2nd South Indian International Movie Awards	Best Director	Yogaraj Bhat	Nominated
2nd South Indian International Movie Awards	Best Actor in a Supporting Role	Ambareesh	Nominated
2nd South Indian International Movie Awards	Best Actress in a Supporting Role	Sindhu Lokanath	Nominated
2nd South Indian International Movie Awards	Best Comedian	Sathish Ninasam	Nominated
2nd South Indian International Movie Awards	Best Lyricist	Yogaraj Bhat for "Bombe Aadsonu"	Nominated
2nd South Indian International Movie Awards	Best Male Playback Singer	Vijay Prakash for "Thund Haikla Sahavasa"	Nominated

== Overseas release ==
Drama was premiered in USA. Drama was also premiered in UAE. Drama was also screened in Germany.
