= Filmfare Award for Best Music Director – Kannada =

Indian annual film award

The Filmfare Award for Best Music Director – Kannada is given by the Filmfare magazine as part of its annual Filmfare Awards for Kannada films.

== Superlatives ==
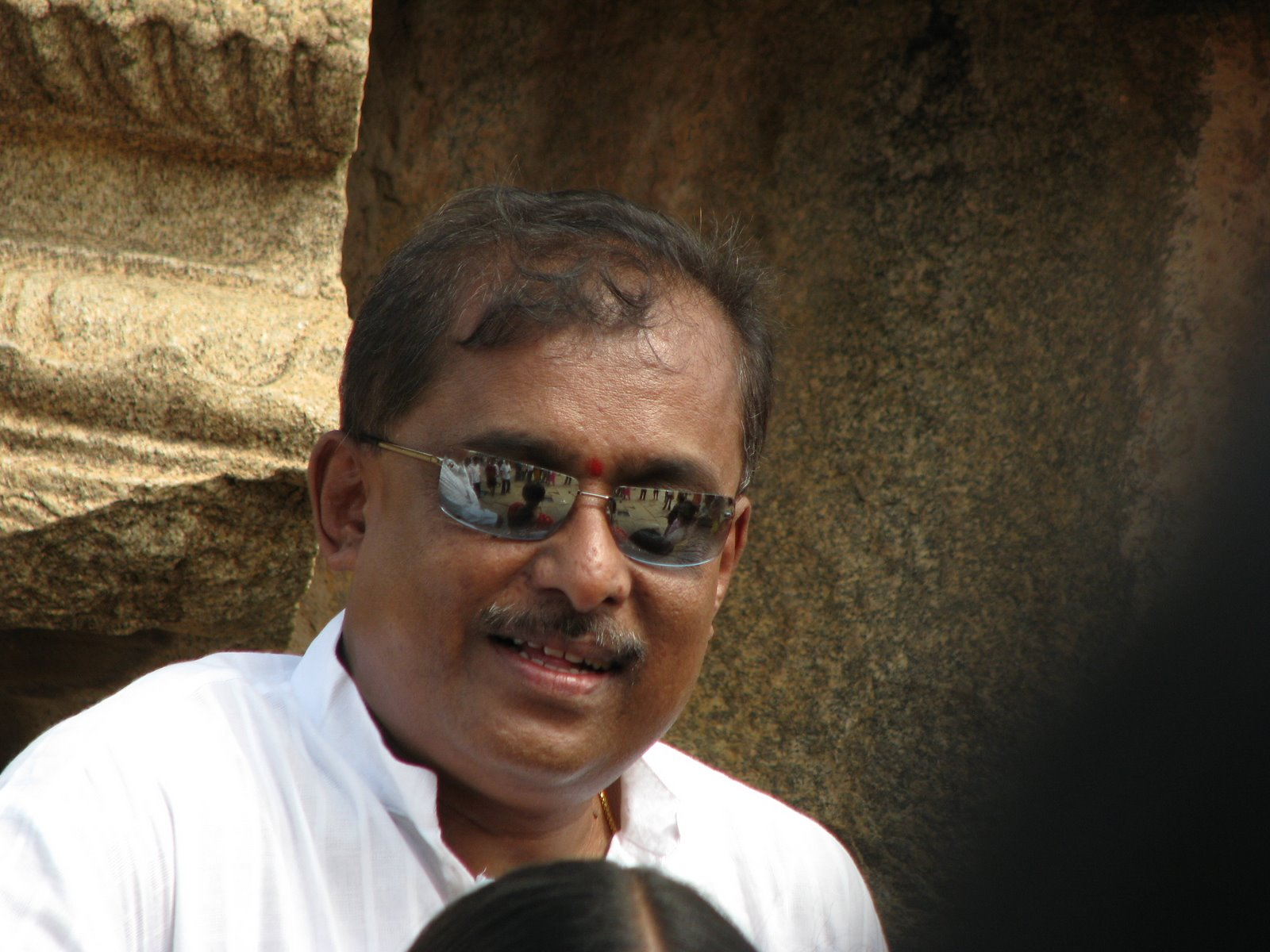
Hamsalekha has won the award a record six times.

Superlative	Music Director	Record
Most award winner	Hamsalekha	6 awards
Second most winner	V. Harikrishna	4 awards
Third most winner	B. Ajaneesh Loknath	3 awards
Third most winner	Gurukiran	3 awards

== Winners ==
Here is a list of the award winners and the films for which they won.

Year	Music Director	Film	Ref
2024	Arjun Janya	Krishnam Pranaya Sakhi	
2023	Charan Raj	Sapta Saagaradaache Ello: Side A	
2022	B. Ajaneesh Loknath	Kantara	
2020–21	Vasuki Vaibhav	Badava Rascal	
2019	AWARDS FUNCTION WAS SUSPENDED DUE TO COVID-19 PANDEMIC		
2018	Vasuki Vaibhav	Sarkari Hi. Pra. Shaale, Kasaragodu, Koduge: Ramanna Rai	
2017	Bharath B. J.	Beautiful Manasugalu	
2016	B. Ajaneesh Loknath	Kirik Party	
2015	Sridhar V. Sambhram	Krishna Leela	
2014	B. Ajaneesh Loknath	Ulidavaru Kandanthe	
2013	Arjun Janya	Bhajarangi	
2012	V. Harikrishna	Drama	
2011	Jassie Gift	Sanju Weds Geetha	
2010	V. Harikrishna	Jackie	
2009	V. Harikrishna	Raaj The Showman	
2008	V. Harikrishna	Gaalipata	
2007	Mano Murthy	Milana	
2006	Mano Murthy	Mungaru Male	
2005	Hamsalekha	Nenapirali	
2004	Gurukiran	Apthamitra	
2003	R. P. Patnaik	Excuse Me	
2002	Gurukiran	Dhumm	
2001	Gurukiran	Chitra	
2000	Hamsalekha	Preethse	
1999	K. Kalyan	Chandramuki Pranasakhi	
1998	Hamsalekha	Yaare Neenu Cheluve	
1997	Deva	Amrutha Varshini	
1996	V. Manohar	Janumada Jodi	
1995	No Award		
1994	Hamsalekha	Haalunda Thavaru	
1993	Hamsalekha	Aakasmika	
1992	C.Ashwath	Mysore Mallige	
1991	Hamsalekha	Ramachaari	
1990	S. A. Rajkumar	Shruthi	
