= Hudugaru =

- Theatrical release poster
- Directed by: K Madesh
- Screenplay by: K Madesh
- Story by: Samuthirakani
- Based on: Naadodigal (Tamil) by Samuthirakani
- Produced by: Parvathamma Rajkumar
- Starring: Puneeth Rajkumar; Srinagar Kitty; Yogesh; Radhika Pandit
- Cinematography: Satya Hegde
- Edited by: Deepu S. Kumar
- Music by: V. Harikrishna
- Production company: Chakreshwari Combines
- Release date: 5 May 2011
- Country: India
- Language: Kannada
- Box office: ₹ 9 crores

Hudugaru (transl. Boys) is a 2011 Kannada-language drama film directed by K. Madesh, starring Puneeth Rajkumar, Srinagar Kitty, Yogesh and Radhika Pandit in the lead roles. The film, which is a remake of the successful 2009 Tamil film Naadodigal, was produced by Parvathamma Rajkumar, with V. Harikrishna having composed the soundtrack and Satya Hegde was the cinematographer. The film released on 5 May 2011 and performed well at the box office.

The film earned Puneeth Rajkumar Filmfare and SIIMA Best Actor Award in Kannada.

== Plot ==
The plot focuses on a trio who attempt to unite their friend with his lover against the wishes of all families involved, and at a heavy cost to themselves, only to realize that the lovers separate after a short while. Three youths – Prabhu, Chandru, and Siddesh (Puneeth Rajakumar, Srinagara Kitty and Yogesh respectively) aspiring for government jobs, and to settle in Dubai are struck with bad luck in life when Sudhir (Vishal Hegde), a best friend of Prabhu falls in love with the daughter of a business tycoon.

Prabhu decides to kidnap the businessman's daughter with his close friends Chandru and Siddesh, so that his friend Sudhir (son of former MP) is happy. While kidnapping her, things go badly for the three friends - Prabhu gets hit badly on his forehead, Chandru loses his right leg and Siddesh becomes deaf.

It is not just those mishaps in the life of the trio. Their destiny is very bad when they are back in their native place. Prabhu loses his love for someone, Siddesh is sent out from the home, Chandru losing a leg finds Pavitra (Prabhu's sister) as a life partner.

The story takes an interesting turn when Sudhir's marriage breaks out in a quarrel between Sudhir and Sushma. The three return to the same place where they were brutally wounded and question the lovers about their separation.

== Cast ==
- Puneeth Rajkumar as Prabhu
- Srinagar Kitty as Chandru
- Yogesh as Siddesh
- Radhika Pandit as Gayathri
- Abhinaya as Pavithra
- Vishal Hegde as Sudhir
- Ramya Barna as Sushma
- Rangayana Raghu as Kodanda
- Sadhu Kokila as Chinthamani, Social Worker
- Avinash as Businessman Paramashiva murthy
- Shivarudra Naik
- Vanitha Vasu as Sudhir's mother
- Srinivas Prabhu as Nataraj
- Gururaj Hoskote
- Shanthamma
- Tabla Nani
- Venkata Ram
- Krishna Adiga
- Asharani
- Honnavalli Shrikanth
- Sudha Belawadi
- Shefali Zariwala as Pankaja (item number "Naa Board Irada Bus")
- Krishna as Prabhu's friend (uncredited)

== Release ==
The film released on 5 May 2011 in around 130 plus cinema screens all over Karnataka.

== Soundtrack ==
Hudugru

Soundtrack album by V. Harikrishna
- Released: May 5, 2011
- Recorded: 2011
- Genre: Feature film soundtrack
- Length: 27:40
- Label: Anand Audio
- Producer: V. Harikrishna
External audio
- Official Audio Jukebox on YouTube

V. Harikrishna's music for the movie have been widely appreciated. The lyrics are written by Jayanth Kaikini, Yogaraj Bhat and V. Nagendra Prasad. The song "Sambo Siva" from the original Tamil film was retained.

No.	Title	Lyrics	Singer(s)	Length
1.	"Naa Boardu Irada Bus (Pankaja)"	Yogaraj Bhat	V. Harikrishna, Mamta Sharma, Naveen Madhav
2.	"Neeralli Sanna Ale"	Jayanth Kaikini	Sonu Nigam, Sunitha Upadrashta
3.	"Yen Chandane Hudugi"	V. Nagendra Prasad	Sukhwinder Singh, Kailash Kher, Vijay Prakash, Priya Himesh
4.	"Shambo Shiva Shambo"	V. Nagendra Prasad	Shankar Mahadevan
5.	"Neeralli Sanna Ale"	Jayanth Kaikini	Sunitha Upadrashta

== Reception ==
=== Critical response ===
Shruti Indira Lakshminarayana from Rediff.com scored the film at 3 out of 5 stars and says "Radhika Pandit plays a small yet significant role. She is expressive in emotional scenes. Abhinaya, who was part of Nadodigal, does a neat job here. Rangayana Raghu is as good as he can get. Sadhu Kokhila does a decent job too. Hudugaru largely remains faithful to the original. Yet it is a one time watch. More so if you haven't watched the original". A critic from The Times of India scored the film at 4 out of 5 stars and wrote "Puneet Rajkumar has displayed an excellent performance, especially in the climax. Srinagara Kitty and Rangayana Raghu have breathed life into their characters. It's Yogesh who walks away with praise for an extraordinary performance. Radhika Pandit and Ramya Barna are impressive. Guruprasad's dialogues and Sathya Hegde's cinematography too deserve praise. The film also has some catchy tunes by V Harikrishna". B S Srivani from Deccan Herald wrote "As this is Puneet’s home production, vulgarity is kept at bay - the ‘item song’ is presented well. Hudugru is a chak-a-chak movie offering entertainment with a message. Whether these hudugru manage to impress friends and lovers remains to be seen. A critic from Bangalore Mirror wrote "But it is not easy to convey the same intensity that the writer intended. Each re-telling dilutes the story, despite its best intentions. Even if making money is the prime motive, the paying audience at least gets the value for what they pay".
