= Olave Jeevana Lekkachaara =

- Directed by: Nagathihalli Chandrashekhar
- Screenplay by: Jogi; Nagathihalli Chandrashekhar
- Produced by: K. Manju; Mark Balaji
- Starring: Srinagara Kitty; Radhika Pandit
- Cinematography: Ajay Vincent
- Edited by: G. Basavaraj Urs
- Music by: Mano Murthy
- Release date: 12 June 2009
- Running time: 127 minutes
- Country: India
- Language: Kannada

Olave Jeevana Lekkachaara! is a 2009 Indian Kannada-language film directed by Nagathihalli Chandrashekhar. with Srinagar Kitty and Radhika Pandit in the lead roles. Chandrashekhar has brilliantly handled the subject in the film which is laced with humour and sarcasm. It's a sentimental family entertainer, with a message for all. With excellent control over the script and neat narration, Nagathihalli has presented his point of view based on his short story Bhoomi Gundagide.

== Plot ==
Balu (Srinagara Kitty) comes to Halekote village, where he falls in love with Rukmini (Radhika Pandit). However, he is brainwashed by a college lecturer (Rangayana Ragu). The lecturer is a self-made revolutionary, who infuses negative thoughts about life and marriage. Balu leaves Rukmini to come back to Bangalore, where he becomes a lecturer and imposes the same theme: rich should become poor; poor should become rich. He changes his mind after seeing the positive sides of family life and decides to return to Rukmini. But the developments shock him.

== Cast ==
- Srinagara Kitty as Balachandra
- Radhika Pandit as Rukmini
- Rangayana Raghu
- Mandya Ramesh
- Ashwath Ninasam
- Daisy Bopanna
- Asif Faroqi

== Soundtrack ==
The music of the film was composed by Mano Murthy.

Track#	Song	Singer(s)
1	"Ba Baare Shaakuntale"	Vijay Prakash
2	"Baalu Moore Dina"	Ananya Bhat, Natana School Children (Mysore)
3	"Nanna Preethiya Geleya"	Rajesh Krishnan, Shreya Ghoshal
4	"Nodi Swamy"	Rajesh Mehar, Chaitra

== Reception ==
=== Critical response ===
A critic from The Times of India scored the film at 4 out of 5 stars and says "Hats off to Radhika Pandit for a classic and lively performance. Srinagara Kitty is simply superb; Rangayana Raghu is impressive. Daisy Bopanna, Ashwath Neenasam and Asif Faroqi excel. Mano Murthy's music is lovely. Ajay Vincent's camerawork is marvellous". A critic from The New Indian Express wrote "Mano Murthy's compositions are good. The camera work of the film is strong. "Olave Jeevana Lekkachara" is a film that will appeal to your intellect. It has some entertainment quotient also". A critic from Bangalore Mirror wrote "Radhika Pandit excels in her role as a girl duped by her lover. Nagatihalli does a neat job of showing what many so called 'intellectuals' really are. But by interpreting his own take on things in multiple climax (there are three) he defeats the purpose. Nonetheless, you have a film for the mind and soul".
