= Ganesh filmography =

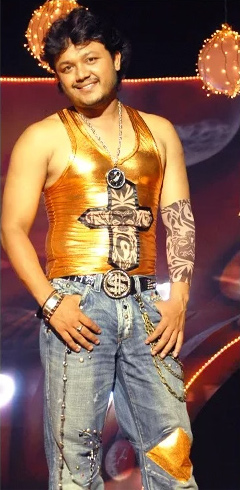
Ganesh in 2007 Kannada film Krishna

Ganesh is an Indian actor and television presenter who primarily works in the Kannada film industry.

== Films ==
=== As actor ===
Key
†	Denotes films that have not yet been released

List of film acting credits
Year	title	Role(s)	Notes	Ref.
2002	Tapori	Henchman		
2003	Hudugigagi	Janardhan		
2003	Game For Love	Ganesh		
2003	Dreams	John		
2004	Abbabba Entha Huduga	Arjun's friend		
2004	Baa Baaro Rasika	Vishwa's friend		
2005	Aham Premasmi	Ganesha		
2005	Magic Ajji	Venkatachalayya's subordinate		
2005	Masala	Basava Bellulli		
2005	Thunta	Gopalakrishna's friend		
2005	Amrithadhare	Venky		
2006	O Priyathama	Thyagu		
2006	Chellata	Ganesh	Debut as lead	
2006	Mungaru Male	Preetham	Nominated—Filmfare Award for Best Actor – Kannada	
2007	Hudugaata	Balu Mahendar		
2007	Cheluvina Chittara	Maadesha	Udaya Film Award for Best Actor	
2007	Krishna	Krishna		
2008	Gaalipata	Ganesh	Filmfare Award for Best Actor – Kannada	
2008	Aramane	Arun		
2008	Bombaat	Anand		
2008	Sangama	Balu		
2009	Circus	Dhanush		
2009	Maleyali Jotheyali	Preetham	Filmfare Award for Best Actor – Kannada	
2010	Ullasa Utsaha	Preetham		
2010	Eno Onthara	Surya		
2011	Kool: Sakkath Hot Maga	Rahul, Manohar Jaraganalli (MJ)	Dual Role; Also director	
2011	Maduve Mane	Suraj		
2011	Shyloo	Manja		
2012	Munjane	Manu		
2012	Romeo	Ganesh		
2012	Rambo	Ganesh	Voice Role	
2012	Mr. 420	Krishna		
2013	Auto Raja	Raja		
2013	Sakkare	Vinay		
2013	Shravani Subramanya	Subramanya		
2014	Dil Rangeela	Preetham		
2015	Khushi Khushiyagi	Raj		
2015	Buguri	Krishna		
2016	Style King	Karthik / Kashi (King)	Dual Role	
2016	Zoom	Santhosh		
2016	Mungaru Male 2	Preetham		
2016	Sundaranga Jaana	Lakshman Prasad "Lucky"		
2017	Pataki	Surya		
2017	Mugulu Nage	Pulkeshi	Also producer	
2017	Chamak	Dr. Kush		
2018	Raambo 2	Ganesh	Voice Role	
2018	Orange	Santosh		
2019	99	Ram		
2019	Gimmick	Gani		
2019	Geetha	Shankar / Aakash		
2021	Sakath	Balu		
2022	Gaalipata 2	Gani		
2022	Triple Riding	Ram / Dr. Mahesh		
2023	Baanadariyalli	Siddharth		
2024	Krishnam Pranaya Sakhi	Krishna		
2026	Picture		Tulu film; special appearance	
2026	Brindavihari †	Madhava		
2026	Yours Sincerely Raam †	Raam		
2026	Pinaka †	TBA		
2026	DJango Krishnamurthy †	Krishnamurthy		
2026	Tamma Sukhaagamana Bayasuva †	TBA		

== Television ==
List of television credits
Year	Title	Role	Television	Notes	Ref.
	Yadva Tadva		ETV Kannada		
2000–2005	Papa Pandu	Doubteshi	ETV Kannada		
2002	Prema Pishachigalu		Udaya TV		
2002	Vatara		Udaya TV		
2003	Comedy Time	Host	Udaya TV	Season 1	
2003	Apartment		Udaya TV		
2009	Comedy Time		Udaya TV	2 episodes	
2014	Super Minute		ETV Kannada	Season 1	
2016–2019	Super Minute		Colors Kannada	Seasons 2–4	
2022	Golden Gang	Host	Zee Kannada		
2022	ISmart Jodi	Host	Star Suvarna		
2023	The Kapil Sharma Show	Guest	Sony Entertainment Television	Hindi show	
