= Buguri (film) =

- Directed by: M. D. Sridhar
- Screenplay by: A. V. Madhu
- Story by: M. D. Sridhar
- Produced by: Manjula Gopalakrishna; Vijayalakshmi Sridhar
- Starring: Ganesh; Richa Panai; Erica Fernandes; Sadhu Kokila
- Narrated by: Darshan
- Cinematography: Jagadish Wali; Ramesh Babu; A. V. Krishna Kumar
- Edited by: P. R. Sounder Raj
- Music by: Mickey J. Meyer
- Production company: SMG Movies
- Distributed by: Thoogudeepa Distributors
- Release date: 14 August 2015
- Running time: 130 minutes
- Country: India
- Language: Kannada

Buguri ( transl. Top) is a 2015 Indian Kannada language film directed by M. D. Sridhar. It stars Ganesh, Richa Panai and Erica Fernandes. Sridhar had previously worked with Ganesh in the films like Chellata (2006) and Krishna (2007). The film's cinematography is handled by AV Krishnakumar and the music has been composed by Mickey J Meyer.

== Plot ==
Krishna (Ganesh) is sent back by his fiancée Ishanya (Erica Fernandes) to pursue back his college lover Nandini (Richa Panai). But after meeting her, he realises she is engaged and returns to Ishanya.

== Cast ==
- Ganesh as Krishna
- Richa Panai as Nandini
- Erica Fernandes as Ishanya
- Sadhu Kokila as Linga, Krishna's friend
- Ashok as Nandini's father
- Chitra Shenoy as Nandini's aunt
- Sudha Belawadi as Krishna's mother
- Thimmegowdru
- Dr Krishna
- Saritha Jain as Krishna's sister
- Mandeep Roy as doctor
- Prasad
- Ashwath
- Abhilash M.
- K. V. Manjaiah
- P. V. Bandarkar
- H. G. Dattatreya as dog owner
- Srinagar Kitty as Karthik (cameo appearance)

== Production ==
M. D. Sridhar returned to direction after two years following his previous venture Bulbul. Buguri marked his third collaboration with actor Ganesh after Chellata (2006) and Krishna (2007), both of which were commercial successes. Buguri was also Ganesh's 25th film as a lead actor. Vedhika was first signed to play one of the female leads, but withdrew due to scheduling conflicts. She was replaced with Arundhati, who filmed for two days before being dropped after Sridhar felt that she did not make a convincing on-screen pairing with Ganesh. In July 2014, Richa Panai was cast as her replacement. Erica Fernandes was signed to portray the other female lead opposite Ganesh.

The film was launched in June 2014 at an event attended by actors Darshan and V. Ravichandran. Principal photography commenced the same month and was completed in December 2014 after an 80-day shooting schedule. For his role, Ganesh underwent training in roller skating and horse riding, with horses brought in from Hubballi for filming. Darshan lent his voice for a portion of the film's climax, while Srinagar Kitty was reported to have been cast in a significant role. Major portions of the film were shot in Mangaluru and Manipal, and in Malaysia. Music for the film was composed by Mickey J. Meyer.

== Soundtrack ==
Buguri

Soundtrack album by Mickey J. Meyer
- Released: 9 June 2015
- Recorded: 2015
- Genre: Soundtrack
- Length: 23:17
- Label: Anand Audio Video
- Producer: Mickey J. Meyer

Mickey J. Meyer chronology
Kerintha (2015)	Buguri (2015)	Brahmotsavam (2016)

The film's background score and soundtrack was composed by Mickey J. Meyer.

All lyrics are written by Kaviraj.

Track listing
No.	Title	Singer(s)	Length
1.	"Arivaagide"	Karthik	4:05
2.	"Halavaaru"	Haricharan, Sahithi	4:06
3.	"Ninna Mane Munde"	Rahul Nambiar, Ramya Behara	4:28
4.	"Ladies and Gentlemen"	Vijay Prakash, Ramya Behara	3:22
5.	"Kannalle"	Karthik, Shivani	3:28
6.	"Alu Bandaru"	Sonu Nigam	3:48
Total length:			23:17
