= Ganesh (actor) =

Indian actor and television presenter (born 1978)

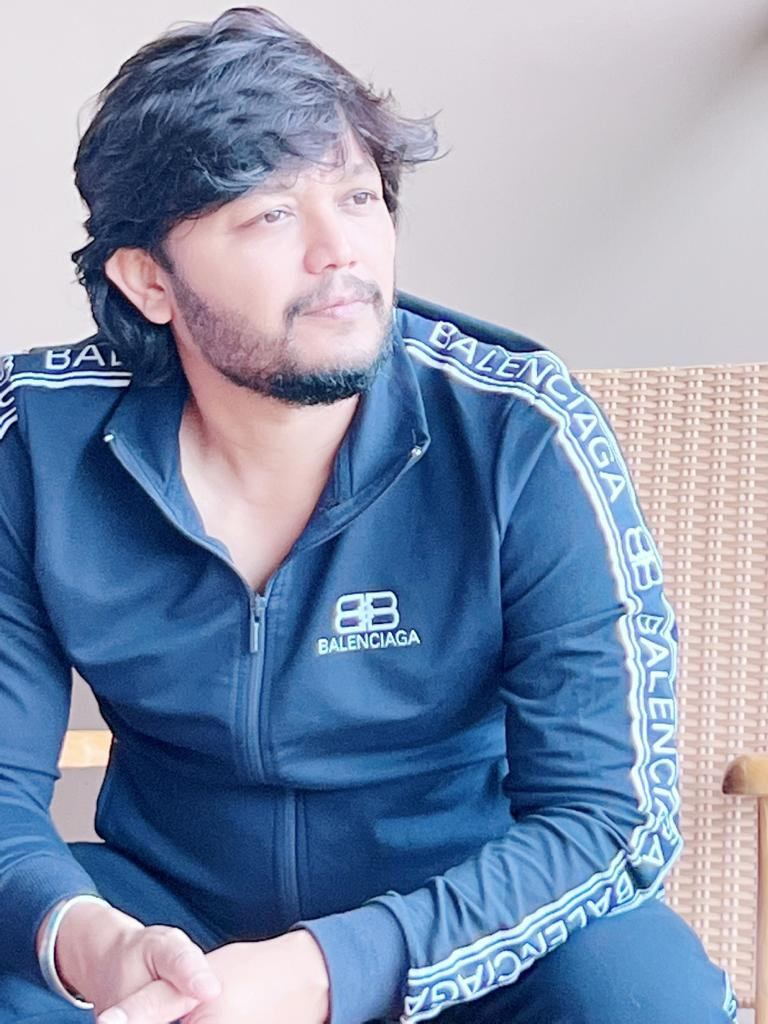
- Born: Ganesh; 2 July 1978 (age 48); Bengaluru, Karnataka, India
- Other names: Golden Star, Gani
- Occupations: Actor; director; producer; television presenter
- Years active: 2002–present
- Works: Full list
- Spouse: Shilpa Barkur (m. 2008)
- Children: 2

Ganesh (born 2 July 1978), known mononymously as Ganesh, is an Indian actor, director, producer and television presenter known for his work in Kannada cinema. Through his career in films and television shows, he has become one of the most popular celebrities and highest-paid actors in Kannada cinema. He is the recipient of several awards, including two Filmfare Awards.

Ganesh shot to fame with the film Mungaru Male (2006), which set a record in Kannada cinema. In theatres, it was speculated to have collected over ₹ 75 crore by the end of its record-breaking 865-day theatrical run. It was the first movie to be screened continuously for one year in a multiplex in any language in India. The success of Mungaru Male brought Ganesh the nickname, "Golden Star".

Ganesh won two consecutive Best Actor awards at Filmfare for the romantic comedy-drama Gaalipata (2008) and in the romantic drama Maleyali Jotheyali (2009). His other major success was Cheluvina Chittara (2007), a remake of Tamil film Kaadhal (2004). His subsequent successful films include, Krishna (2007), Romeo (2012), Shravani Subramanya (2013), Zoom (2016), Chamak (2017), 99 (2019), Gaalipata 2 (2022), Triple Riding (2022) and Krishnam Pranaya Sakhi (2024).

== Early life ==
Ganesh was born on 2 July 1978 in Adakamaranahalli, a village in Nelamangala of Bengaluru Rural district in Karnataka. His father, Kishan, is originally from Nepal and belongs to the Gurkha clan whilst his mother, Sulochana, is from Karnataka. He has two siblings: younger brothers, Mahesh, who debuted as an actor in the Kannada film Namak Haraam (2015), and Umesh. Ganesh married Shilpa Barkur on 11 February 2008, and has two children: Charithriya and Vihaan.

Ganesh received primary education at Basaveshwara English School in Nelamangala and secondary education in Standard English School in Dasarahalli, Bangalore. According to Ganesh, he was "mischievous and was always made to kneel down outside the classroom, but was also the darling of the teachers due to the active participation in cultural activities". While in college, he participated actively in inter-collegiate drama skits.

== Career ==
=== 2002–2005: Television and shift to cinema ===
Ganesh's first project was Guttu, a telefilm directed by India's youngest female film director, Priyabharati Joshi, which remains unreleased. Joshi offered the project to Ganesh just as he was about to graduate from Adarsh Film Institute, against the advice of industry insiders who criticized her choice of a newcomer. Guttu was eventually screened at film festivals and in a few theatres in the US, as the producers weren't able to find a suitable time slot to show it on TV. After graduating in diploma in film acting, he was offered roles in Television series and sitcoms. He was also performing at various road shows and orchestras. However, a major breakthrough in television came with the comedy talk-show Comedy Time aired on Udaya TV. Through the success of the show, Ganesh gained immense popularity among the audience with his comic-timing getting prominent notice. He earned the sobriquet "Comedy Time" Ganesh post the show's success.

Ganesh's initial film appearances were largely as extra actor playing uncredited roles as the lead characters' friend. His first noticeable supporting role was of a villain character in the film Tapori (2002) which was directed by B. Suresha. Portraying the character was a "gory" experience for Ganesh, since "the hero was supposed to hit on [his] face and hit so hard that [his] nose started bleeding". Following this, in 2003, he played side-kick roles in three films out of which M. D. Sridhar's Game For Love was noteworthy while the other two under-performed at the box-office. He continued such roles in the years 2004 and 2005 starring in films such as Dayal Padmanabhan's Baa Baaro Rasika (2004) playing Sunil Raoh's friend, V. Ravichandran's Aham Premasmi (2005) and Nagathihalli Chandrashekar's Amrithadhare (2005) co-starring Dhyan, Ramya which also had a guest role played by Amitabh Bachchan.

=== 2006–2008: Success and stardom ===
In 2006, director M. D. Sridhar approached Ganesh to play the lead role in his film Chellata and he signed the project. Featuring alongside Rekha Vedavyas, Ganesh's performance was well received, and the film was a box office success despite getting mixed reviews. Soon after, director Preetham Gubbi approached him and outlined the story of his next script titled Mungaru Male, which had rain as a backdrop and to be directed by Yogaraj Bhat. He was actively involved throughout the script development process and became curious to act in the movie. He also helped director Bhat to meet the producer, E. Krishnappa. Since Krishnappa knew Ganesh (both hails from Adakamaranahalli, Nelamangala), he agreed to finance the film. Actress Pooja Gandhi was roped in to play the female lead and the film was mainly shot during the rainy season in places like Madikeri, Sakaleshpura, Jog Falls and Gadag. The film was released on 29 December 2006 and was critically acclaimed particularly drawing praises for Ganesh's performance as Preetham. The film went on to become one of the highest grossers ever in the history of Kannada cinema and achieved cult status. The film became the first ever Kannada film to be screened in multiplexes for a year. The film established the careers of Ganesh, Bhat, Gubbi, Gandhi, the cinematographer S. Krishna, the music composer Mano Murthy, the lyricist Jayanth Kaikini and the playback singer Sonu Nigam in Kannada cinema. Ganesh earned the title "Golden Star" after the film's success and was nominated at the Filmfare Awards for the Best Actor.

In 2007, Ganesh collaborated again with M. D. Sridhar and Pooja Gandhi in Krishna, which became sensational hit at the box office, completing 100-days in main centres of Karnataka. He further starred in Hudugaata, the Indian adaptation of the American film It Happened One Night (1934) costarring Rekha Vedavyas. The film met with critical reviews and achieved moderate success at the box office. The third project of the year, Cheluvina Chittara, a remake of Tamil film Kaadhal, marked the first association of Ganesh with director S. Narayan and costarred Amoolya. The film had a successful run at the box office and was one of the highest grossers of the year. He also won the Udaya Film Award for Best Actor.

=== 2008–2015: Direction and career expansion ===
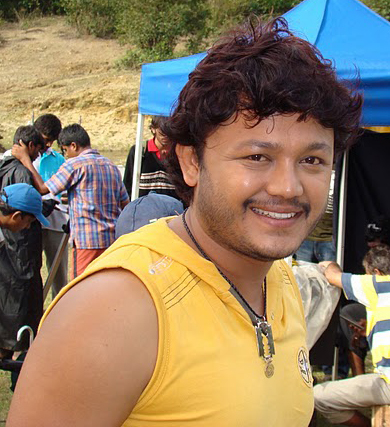
Ganesh at a film location

In 2008, Ganesh appeared in four films. In his first release of the year, Gaalipata, a triple hero coming-of-age comedy, Ganesh partnered once again with Yogaraj Bhat and shot for the film in and around Thirthahalli and Agumbe region alongside Diganth and Rajesh Krishnan. The film opened to positive reviews from critics. Emerging as a commercial success, it completed a 175-day run in theaters and received 11 nominations at the 56th Filmfare Awards South, winning three awards including Best Actor for Ganesh. His next success came through Aramane directed by Nagashekar, making his debut and had actress Roma paired with him. This was followed by two unsuccessful projects, Bombaat directed by D. Rajendra Babu pairing opposite Ramya and Sangama with Vedhicka. He started the year 2009 with an average grosser comedy film Circus. The film featured him as a carefree urban youth who along with his friends help in foiling the plans of a terrorist gang. This was soon followed by another blockbuster film Maleyali Jotheyali which fetched him his second Filmfare Award. The film was produced under his home banner "Golden Movies" by his wife Shilpa and directed by Preetham Gubbi. Ganesh made his debut as a singer with this film. Critics unanimously praised his performance and the film successfully completed 100 days run. In 2010, he featured in box-office failure films including Ullasa Utsaha, a remake of Telugu film Ullasamga Utsahamga and Eno Onthara, a remake of Tamil film Kushi.

Ganesh made his debut in direction with the film Kool in 2011. Starring in the dual roles alongside Sana Khan, the film was produced under his home banner. The film met with critical reviews from critics and under performed at the box-office. A critic from Bangalore Mirror wrote "Ganesh attempts too many things in this film, making it a mess of everything.He sings, co-writes dialogues, gets his wife to produce the movie. Unwarranted and avoidable. Not Kool at all". Upon its failure, Ganesh termed it as a "learning experience". This was followed by Maduve Mane, yet another unsuccessful project that had Shradha Arya paired opposite him. Later in the year, Ganesh reunited with S. Narayan for the film, Shyloo, a remake of Tamil film Mynaa (2010) which got positive reviews from critics and the lead actors performances were appreciated. In 2012, Ganesh featured in three films and gave a voice over for the film Rambo starring Sharan in the lead role. Munjane marked the third collaboration with S. Narayan. Romeo, directed by PC Shekhar and starring Bhavana was a musical hit soon after its release. The third release of the year, Mr. 420, however, was a box-office bomb. His following releases in the year 2013 namely Auto Raja, Sakkare and Shravani Subramanya were all average grossers except the latter which was one of the successful films of the year and earned him a Filmfare Award nomination. He had a solo release in 2014 in the form of Preetham Gubbi's comedy drama Dil Rangeela. The film met with average reviews and was declared a sleeper hit of the year.

In the year 2015, Ganesh featured in his 25th film as actor through the film Buguri The film met with average response from critics and audience. The other release Khushi Khushiyagi was a remake of Telugu film Gunde Jaari Gallanthayyinde (2013).

=== 2016–present: Career slump and progression ===
Ganesh's first among four releases in 2016 featured him in dual roles performing both comedy and action for the film Style King. Directed by PC Shekhar and co-starring Remya Nambeesan, the film received a lukewarm response at the box office with critics branding the film as 'Typical'. Next he appeared in the comedy drama Zoom and paired opposite Radhika Pandit. The film, adapted from Lover Come Back (1961), featured actor Kashinath in his last on-screen appearance. This met with mixed reviews from the critics and termed as a box-office failure project. He reprised his role as Preetham in his next release Mungaru Male 2, a sequel to the 2007 film, this time directed by Shashank and featuring Neha Shetty as Nandini. The film performed moderately well at the box office and met with critical reviews with a critic from Bangalore Mirror wrote that "Unfortunately, a sequel creates great expectations and 2006’s Mungaru Male was a tough act to follow. Shashank’s attempt is forced and he seems to have fallen for the routine traps under the weight of those expectations". His final release of the year was a comedy Sundaranga Jaana, directed by Ramesh Aravind and was a remake of Telugu film Bhale Bhale Magadivoy (2015).

His films Pataki, Mugulu Nage and Chamak all released in 2017 and met with critical reviews and found moderate to weak response from the audience. He produced Mugulu Nage along with his wife Shilpa and teamed up with director Yogaraj Bhat after 10 years. His dull phase continued in 2018 with the release of Orange which was the first ever venture in Kannada cinema to have been acquired by the Amazon Prime prior to its release. In 2019, he appeared in 99 the remake of Tamil film '96. The title 99 was chosen because of director Preetham Gubbi's friendship with Ganesh which began in 1999, when they were in college together. The film met with positive response lauding the performances of both Ganesh and Bhavana. His next releases, Gimmick and Geetha, however received negative reviews. The latter film was based on the backdrop of Gokak Agitation. His lone release in 2021 was an average grosser, Sakath, an action drama film directed by Suni. The film received generally mixed to positive reviews from critics upon release. While the cast performances, writing, music and cinematography received praise, criticism was directed at its length.

Ganesh's first 2022 role was his starring role as Gani in Gaalipata 2, directed by Yogaraj Bhat and featuring Anant Nag, Diganth, Pawan Kumar, Vaibhavi Shandilya, Samyuktha Menon and Sharmiela Mandre alongside him. The film, officially not the sequel to the 2008 film of the same name, made profits out of its theatrical and OTT releases. His next was a comedy drama Triple Riding which released after a delay of 3 years and met with mixed critical reviews. In 2023, he teamed up with Preetham Gubbi for the fourth time for the film Baanadariyalli. The film marked the first Kannada project to have shot in Kenya's Maasai Mara National Reserve.

Ganesh's next appearance was in back to back Srinivas Raju's directorials, Krishnam Pranaya Sakhi, which released in 2024 and Brindavihari in 2026. His upcoming film Yours Sincerely Raam has been in production since 2024.

=== Brand ambassador ===
Ganesh was signed as the brand ambassador of Reliance Mobile (2009–2011), Coca-Cola (2010–2011), and Rim-Jim product from Coca-Cola (2022).

== Awards and nominations ==
Awards and nominations
Award	Wins	Nominations
Udaya Film Awards	1	0
Filmfare Awards South	2	2
South Indian International Movie Awards	0	0
Cine Gandha Awards	1	0
Suvarna Film Awards	1	0
Love Lavike Readers Choice Awards	0	1
- Total
Awards won	5
Nominations	4

Year (Note: Refers to the year in which ceremony was held.)	Film	Award	Category	Result	Ref.
2006	Mungaru Male	54th Filmfare Awards South	Best Actor	Nominated	
2007	Cheluvina Chittara	Udaya Film Awards	Best Actor	Won	
2008	Cheluvina Chittara	Cine Gandha Awards	Best Actor	Won	
2008	Gaalipata	56th Filmfare Awards South	Best Actor	Won	
2008	Gaalipata	Suvarna Film Awards	Most Popular Actor	Won	
2009	Maleyali Jotheyali	Filmfare Awards South	Best Actor – Kannada	Won	
2013	Shravani Subramanya	Filmfare Awards South	Best Actor – Kannada	Nominated	
2018	Mugulu Nage	Love Lavike Readers Choice Awards	Best Actor	Won	
2018	Mugulu Nage	Filmfare Awards South	Best Actor – Kannada	Nominated	
2018	Chamak	South Indian International Movie Awards	Best Actor – Kannada	Nominated	
2019	Orange	Filmfare Award	Best Actor – Kannada	Nominated	
2021	Sakath	South Indian International Movie Awards	Best Actor – Kannada	Nominated	
2025	Krishnam Pranaya Sakhi	South Indian International Movie Awards	Best Actor – Kannada	Nominated	
2025	Krishnam Pranaya Sakhi	70th Filmfare Awards South	Best Actor	Nominated	
