= Khushi Khushiyagi =

2015 film by Yogi G. Raj

- Directed by: Yogi G. Raj
- Written by: Vijay Kumar Konda
- Produced by: A. Hariprasad Rao; A. Prasad Chaudhary
- Starring: Ganesh; Amulya; Nandini Rai
- Cinematography: Shreesha Kuduvalli
- Edited by: Jo Ni Harsha
- Music by: Anup Rubens
- Production company: HPR Entertainment Pvt. Ltd.
- Distributed by: M. N. Kumar
- Release date: 1 January 2015
- Running time: 151 minutes
- Country: India
- Language: Kannada

Khushi Khushiyagi ( transl. Happy, Happily) a 2015 Indian Kannada romantic comedy film, the first by the director Yogi G. Raj with former associate directors Preetham Gubbi and Harsha. It stars Ganesh, Amulya, and Nandini Rai. It is a remake of the Telugu film Gunde Jaari Gallanthayyinde (2013) and was released on 1 January 2015.

== Plot ==
Raj is an independent, carefree software engineer, who believes that everyone should love their independence and take their decisions wisely. At his friend Sadhu's wedding reception, he sees Priya and falls for her. He asks Sadhu's wife to learn more about Priya. Sadhu's wife gives Priya's number to her husband and asks him to pass it to Raj. A miscommunication between Raj and Sadhu leads to Raj calling another woman, Nandini. Raj mistakes Nandini for Priya on the phone and has a conversation with her where he calls her Chinnu. Unknown to him, Nandini knows about Raj and develops an interest in him. Through a series-of-events, everything is revealed and Raj's confusion is cleared.

Meanwhile, Raj is helping his friend Anand to attract the attention of another girl, who turns out to be Priya. Priya falls for Anand, but a series-of-comic-events lead to Anand eventually doubting Priya, which puts their relationship at stake. This is later resolved and they come together. Meanwhile, Nandini plans vengeance against Raj for the deception and pain that he put her through. She gains employment as Raj's boss and uses this position to tempt him, putting him through hardships and seducing him. Raj decide to propose to his boss (Nandini), but she is already planning to reject his proposal to avenge her pain. Just before he proposes, Raj realizes that he is truly in love with Chinnu. He reaches her house to plead for forgiveness and Nandini reveals herself; they reunite with a hug.

== Cast ==
- Ganesh as Raj
- Amulya as Nandini aka Chinnu
- Nandini Rai as Priya
- Vijayanand as Anand
- Sadhu Kokila as Sadhu
- Achyuth Kumar as Nandini's father

== Production ==
=== Development ===
Yogi G. Raj expressed his intention to become an independent director after working with thenotable directors Preetham Gubbi and Harsha. He chose a remake for his first film and obtained the rights. The title for the film was initially Savira Janmaku, subsequently changed to Crazy Boy, which became Shokilal, which then turned into Kushi Kushiyali before being finalised as Kushi Kushiyagi.

=== Casting ===
Before Ganesh was given the lead role, the producers considered Puneeth Rajkumar but scheduling conflicts prevented this. Kajal Agarwal was approached to play the character of Nadini, which was originally played by Nithya Menen in Gunde Jaari Gallanthayyinde. The director instead chose Amulya, who had appeared with Ganesh in Cheluvina Chittara and Shravani Subramanya. The Telugu actress Nandini Rai was added to the cast to play the second lead of a fashion designer that was played by Isha Talwar in the original Telugu version.

== Soundtrack ==
Khushi Khushiyagi

Soundtrack album by Anup Rubens
- Released: 13 November 2014
- Recorded: 2014
- Genre: Feature film soundtrack
- Length: 20:36
- Label: Lahari Music
- Producer: Anup Rubens

Anup Rubens chronology
Chinnadana Nee Kosam (2014)	Khushi Khushiyagi (2014)	Temper (2015)

Music director Anup Rubens scored the music for the original film (Gunde Jaari Gallanthayyinde) and for this remake. The soundtrack EP consists of five tracks. The lyrics were written by Jayant Kaikini, K. Kalyan and V. Nagendra Prasad. All of the songs were reused from the original.

No.	Title	Lyrics	Singer(s)	Length
1.	"Arey Arey"	Kaviraj	Anup Rubens, Anuradha Bhat	4:05
2.	"Atiyaitu"	Jayanth Kaikini	Ankit Tiwari, Shreya Ghoshal	4:11
3.	"Neene Neene"	Jayanth Kaikini	Adnan Sami	4:12
4.	"Neenyare Neenyare"	Kaviraj	Santosh, Sharmila Katke	4:02
5.	"Rimbola Rimbola"	V. Nagendra Prasad	Divya, Santosh	4:06
Total length:				20:36

== Reception ==
=== Critical response ===
GS Kumar of The Times of India scored the film at 3.5 out of 5 stars and wrote "Ganesh gives the impression that his role is tailor-made for him. Proof of this can be gleaned from his comic timing and delivery of lines, which bring the roof down. Shades of ‘Shravani Subramanya’ are visible in Amulya's role, who essays a stellar role as well. Debutant Nandini Rai holds out promise." Shashiprasad SM of Deccan Chronicle wrote "Overall this is a happy film to watch but the director could have trimmed it a bit in the second half. Watch out for more Ganesh-Amulya onscreen pair in the near future!" Sify wrote "Director Yogi G Raj could have thought of a different approach instead of just repeating the original, he needs to look into depth of characters at few places. The movie is just an entertainer and we do not recommend it if you are not a Tollywood fan!" A Shardhha of The New Indian Express wrote "A neat little trim by the editor could have made it slicker. However, this crib aside, the film does not disappoint and provides dollops of laughter. Watch it and start the year with a smile. The 155 minutes spent watching this film go by in a breeze." S Vishwanath of Deccan Herald wrote "While lover-boy Ganesh, smooth-talking Amulya & co courageously go through the charade, you scurry to the exit drained of the happiness you harboured and which the title professed to provide." Shyam Prasad S of Bangalore Mirror wrote "Unlike Shravani Subramanya which was original, Kushi Kushiyagi is the remake of the Telugu film Gunde Jaari Gallanthayyinde. The debutant director is honesty personified as he does no changes to the original."
