= Odeya (film) =

2019 film directed by M. D. Sridhar

- Theatrical release poster
- Directed by: M. D. Sridhar
- Screenplay by: M. D. Sridhar
- Story by: Siva
- Based on: Veeram (Tamil)
- Produced by: N Sandesh
- Starring: Darshan; Sanah Thimmayyah; Devaraj; P. Ravi Shankar
- Cinematography: A. V. Krishna Kumar
- Edited by: K. M. Prakash
- Music by: V. Harikrishna
- Production company: Sandesh Production
- Distributed by: Sandesh Distribution
- Release date: 12 December 2019 (India)
- Running time: 164 minutes
- Country: India
- Language: Kannada

Odeya (transl. Owner) is a 2019 Indian Kannada-language action comedy film written and directed by M. D. Sridhar, and produced by Sandesh Nagaraj through the production studio Sandesh Combines. The film stars Darshan, debutante Sanah Thimmayyah, Devaraj and P. Ravi Shankar. The film's score is composed by V. Harikrishna with additional songs by Arjun Janya. It's a remake of the Tamil-language film Veeram.

== Plot ==
Gajendra Narayana Varma is a brave person who lives with his four brothers Nagendra, Vijayendra, Surendra and Rajendra at a village in Karnataka. They are often caught in fights, where Adv. Chari bails them out whenever legal issues arise because of their brawls. Gajendra hates the idea of marriage as he feels that his wife might create disharmony among brothers. Though the four younger brothers pretend they don't want to get married, they all have secret lovers.

The brothers learn through Gajendra's childhood friend DC Krishnamurthy that Gajendra, in his school days, was in love with a girl named Shakambari Devi (fondly called Sakku) and his brothers scheme to find her and reintroduce her to Gajendra in order to rekindle their relationship, but later finds that she is married now and has kids. The brothers conspire to find another woman named Shakambari Devi, because Gajendra was not in love with that girl so much as her name, and when he meets another girl with that name, he is sure to lose his heart to her, just because she bears that name. Though initially reluctant later, Gajendra himself falls in love with her.

Gajendra clashes with a goon called Bettappa to take care of market in the village. Bettappa tries to kill Gajendra's brothers while Gajendra kidnaps Bettappa's son. After clashing, Gajendra banishes Bettappa from the village. While travelling in train to Sakku's village, Sakku narrates her family background to Gajendra. Sakku's father Srinivas Odeyar was a respected man in the village who hated violence, while his son was exact opposite who killed people, but when he was killed Srinivas Odeyar refused to bury him and decided to make his village with peace and harmony. Later, few goons enter into the train, but Gajendra bashes all the goons, Sakku is shocked to see Gajendra whom she thought as a non-violent person, where she leaves for her village and tells Gajendra to never see her again.

Gajendra and his brothers arrive at Sakku's village with clean shaven look he reveals to Sakku that he has changed and he would never harbor violence again. Gajendra and his brothers are welcomed by her family, where he is touched and impressed by their love, affection and hospitality. Gajendra discovers that a goon named Narasimha wants to kill Srinivas Odeyar and his family, Gajendra confronts Narasimha at the prison for the reason, where he learns that Narasimha's father Durga Prasad was responsible for the blast of matchstick factory. Srinivas Odeyar complained against Durga Prasad, who got arrested and killed himself by jumping in front of a lorry from a police van. Narasimha witnessed his father's death and swore revenge against Srinivas Odeyar.

Gajendra challenges Narasimha that he will protect Srinivas Odeyar's family, where he finishes all the goons and solves all their problems without the knowledge of Srinivas Odeyar and family. When Srinivas Odeyar's granddaughter finds sickles under Gajendra's jeep, Srinivas Odeyar orders Gajendra to leave the town. Narasimha, who escapes from death penalty arrives to kill Srinivas Odeyar, but Gajendra keeps him and his family in a safe place. Narasimha informs Gajendra that he had kidnapped Surendra, Gajendda arrives at the nick of time and saves his brother, but instead gets attacked by Narasimha. Srinivas Odeyar and his family who arrives at the place realise the risk taken by Gajendra to save the family. Though brutally attacked, Gajendra rises steadily where he kills Narasimha and his henchmen. Srinivas Odeyar, who is impressed with Gajendra's valour gets Gajendra and Sakku married. Thus, Gajendra and his brothers get married with their lovers.

== Cast ==
- Darshan as Gajendra Narayana Varma
- Sanah Thimmayyah as Shakambari "Sakku" Devi
- Devaraj as Srinivas Odeyar
- P. Ravi Shankar as Narasimha
- Sharath Lohitashwa as Bettappa (Local Gangster)
- Pankaj Narayan as Surendra
- Yashas Surya as Vijayendra
- Chikkanna as Lawyer Chari
- Madhusudhan Rao as Durga Prasad
- Sadhu Kokila as Parandhama Odeyar
- Ravishankar Gowda as District Commissioner Krishnamurthy
- Tabla Nani
- Bhojaraj Vamanjoor
- Babitha (Shruthi Raj)
- Vijay Chendoor as College security guard

== Music ==
Odeya

Soundtrack album by Arjun Janya
- Released: 2019
- Recorded: 2019
- Genre: Feature film soundtrack
- Length: 11:41
- Label: Anand Audio
- Producer: Arjun Janya

Arjun Janya chronology
Bharaate (2019)	Odeya (2019)	Kotigobba 3 (2019)

Music composed by Arjun Janya, and released on Anand Audio Company.

Track list
No.	Title	Lyrics	Singer(s)	Length
1.	"Odeya Hey Odeya"	V. Nagendra Prasad	Vyasaraj	03:42
2.	"Shyaane Love Aagoythalle Nanji"	V. Nagendra Prasad	Hemanth, Indu Nagaraj	03:53
3.	"Kaaneyagiruve Naanu"	Jayanth Kaikini	Sonu Nigam, Anuradha Bhat	04:06
4.	"Malavalli Maavana Magane"	Kaviraj	Kailash Kher, Santhosh Venky, Sony Komanduri	3:57
Total length:				15:28

== Release ==
The film was released on 12 December 2019.
