= Ramleela (2015 Kannada film) =

2015 Indian action comedy film

- Soundtrack cover
- Directed by: Vijay Kiran
- Screenplay by: Vijay Kiran
- Story by: Sreedhar Seepana
- Based on: Loukyam (2014) by Sriwass
- Produced by: Soundarya Jagadish
- Starring: Chiranjeevi Sarja; Amulya
- Cinematography: Bharani K. Dharan
- Music by: Anup Rubens
- Production company: Soundarya Jagadish Productions
- Release date: 12 November 2015
- Running time: 140 minutes
- Country: India
- Language: Kannada

Ramleela is a 2015 Indian Kannada-language action comedy film directed by Vijay Kiran and produced by Soundarya Jagadish. The film stars Chiranjeevi Sarja and Amulya, pairing up for the first time, in the lead roles. The film is a remake of Telugu film, Loukyam starring Gopichand and Rakul Preet Singh.

The principal photography of the film commenced from 2 April 2015. Actor Darshan released the trailer of the film in early October 2015. The film released on 12 November 2015. The introduction of the character Boiling Star Bablu spoofs the hero introduction scene of Mr. and Mrs. Ramachari and the same character spoofs the interval fight sequence of Veera Madakari in the climax of the film. The theatrical poster of the 1975 movie Thrimurthy was used in the film to show an edited photo of Ram, his father, and grandfather. The comedy sequences of heroine cheating boys in cafe shop in the name of love was copied from the 2013 movie Balupu.

== Plot ==
Ram-leela begins with Ram kidnapping Neetu, who is the sister of Annachi, as she is marrying Bharath although Neetu is in love with someone else. He leaves for Bangalore and waits for everything in his home, Mysore to clear. He stays with his friend Lakshmi. There he falls for Chandrakala, the sister of a troublemaker Baby. Chandrakala rags other students in the college using her sister's power. After her initial rejection, Ram gets her to reciprocate his feelings. Meanwhile, Annachi arrives at Bangalore in order to reach Sippy, the driver who helped Ram kidnap Neetu. Annachi, unaware of the fact that he is traveling in Sippy's taxi, goes around Bangalore with a rising television actor named Boiling star Bablu.

Meanwhile, Ugrappa is an MLA, who is behind Chandrakala's life attacks her, through which Ram discovers that Chandrakala is actually Annachi's second sister and that Annachi had sent her with Baby to Bangalore to maintain a low profile. Annachi readies Chandrakala to marry Bharath. He also continues to search for whoever (Ram) abducted his sister. Using the help of Nano Shastri, Ram manages to get Annachi and Chandrakala into his house. He also learns that the reason Ugrappa wants to kill Chandrakala. Ugrappa's younger sister Vasanthi killed herself because she loved Annachi, although he did not reciprocate the same. He hires Sanjana Sippy, Sippy's wife, to act like his father, Mekedaatu Pappana aka Puppy's wife.

He tells Neetu to come back on the engagement day to act as if not married and Annachi fixes the marriage of his elder sister with Bharat, but unexpectedly they learn that Neetu is pregnant and so Bharat refuses to marry. Then Ram tells Annachi that his brother who is actually Neetu's husband and is acting as Annachi's brother will marry Neetu. Annachi agrees for the wedding and, in turn tells Chandrakala that she is to marry Bharat again. Through an attack incident, Ram learns that Bharat is Ugrappa's son. He tells Ugrappa that even Annachi is aware of this fact and is planning to kill Bharat on a trip to Srisailam. Ugrappa ends up believing him and attacks Annachi and the group on the way. He foolishly reveals to Annachi that Bharat is his son and is aware that Annachi will kill him.

When Ugrappa realizes his folly, he takes Chandrakala (using Annachi's henchman Bunty) and Bharat and escapes from the spot. Boiling star Bablu, who mistakes it to be a movie shoot stops Ugrappa on the way which gives enough time for Ram to reach Ugrappa. In a thrilling climax, Ram gets Annachi to beat up Ugrappa and using his Sympathy angle trick, which he had earlier used to get Annachi and his sister together, He gets Annachi to agree for his and Chandrakala's wedding as well. The film ends with Sippy saying that with tactfulness, not only Annachi, but even God can be fooled.

== Cast ==
- Chiranjeevi Sarja as Ram
- Amulya as Chandrakala "Chandu"
- Sanjjana as Sanjana, Sippy's wife
- Urvashi as Baby
- Sadhu Kokila as Taxi Driver Sippy "Siphone Sridhar"
- Rangayana Raghu as Mekedaatu Paapanna aka Puppy
- Chikkanna as Lakshmi
- Ravishankar Gowda as Boiling Star Bablu
- Ravi Kale as Ugrappa
- Shobharaj as Annachi
- Master Snehith
- Kuri Prathap
- Taranga Vishwa
- Mohan Juneja as Annachi's henchman
- Vijay Koundinya
- Kaddipudi Chandru as Baby's brother
- P. N. Sathya
- Victory Vasu
- Tennis Krishna as Nano Shastri
- Tulasi Shivamani

== Production ==
Producer Soundarya Jagadish obtained the remake rights of the Telugu film Loukyam and chose a debutant director Vijay Kiran to direct the film giving a large amount of native touch to the remake. Vijay Kiran wrote the screenplay as well for the film and roped in actress Amulya and music director Anup Rubens to the team. The team went to Georgia to shoot the song sequences making it the first Kannada film to shoot in those locations. Actress Sanjjanaa was roped in to play a special guest character role.

== Soundtrack ==
Ramleela

Soundtrack album by Anup Rubens
- Released: 19 October 2015
- Recorded: 2015
- Genre: Feature film soundtrack
- Length: 16:53
- Label: Anand Audio Video
- Producer: Anup Rubens

Anup Rubens chronology
| Courier Boy Kalyan (2015) | Ramleela (2015) | Soukhyam (2015) |

The film's soundtrack and original score is composed by Anup Rubens, who also composed the original Telugu version. A total of 5 songs have been composed out of which two are taken from the original version. "Oh Vayyari" and "Oh Amulya Amulya" are based on "Soodu Soodu" and "Tere Beautiful Anke", respectively. Actor Puneeth Rajkumar recorded his voice for a song which was launched by actor Dhruva Sarja. A unique idea of launching each song making it a total of six audio launches has been planned for the film's soundtrack. Reportedly, there would be five different audio launches for the five tracks and a final launch officially for all the tracks.

The second track was officially launched at actor Upendra's residence. The song featuring Sanjjanaa was released by Upendra and Priyanka Upendra on Sanjjanaa's birthday. A week later, the third song was released by actor Shiva Rajkumar.

Track-List
| No. | Title | Lyrics | Singer(s) | Length |
|---|---|---|---|---|
| 1. | "Oh Vayyari" | D. C. Sudarshan | Puneeth Rajkumar | 3:22 |
| 2. | "Oh Amulya Amulya" | K. Kalyan | Vijay Prakash, Apoorva Sridhar, Santhosh Venky | 3:39 |
| 3. | "Neenu Banda Mele" | Kaviraj | Sonu Nigam, Shravani | 3:55 |
| 4. | "Arey Sunny Leone" | D. C. Sudarshan | Ranina Reddy, Anup Rubens | 3:53 |
| 5. | "Ramleela Title Song" | D. C. Sudarshan | Chorus | 2:04 |
| Total length: | | | | 16:53 |
