= Male (film) =

- Directed by: A. R. Shiva Tejas
- Written by: R. Chandru
- Produced by: R. Chandru
- Starring: Prem; Amulya
- Cinematography: Sugnaan
- Edited by: K. M. Prakash
- Music by: Jassie Gift
- Production company: R. Chandru Productions
- Distributed by: RS Films
- Release date: 7 August 2015
- Country: India
- Language: Kannada

Male (transl. Rain) is a 2015 Indian Kannada language romantic comedy film directed by Tejas and produced by R. Chandru under his home banner. The film stars Prem and Amulya in the lead roles. The film was released on 7 August 2015.

== Cast ==
- Prem as Varun
- Amulya as Varsha
- Sadhu Kokila
- Bullet Prakash
- Padmaja Rao
- Jai Jagadish
- Shivaram
- Gowthami
- Nagendra Shah
- Ninasam Siddhart
- Nagamangala Jayaram

== Production ==
Most of the filming took place at Bangalore and Sakleshpur localities.

== Soundtrack ==
Male

Soundtrack album by Jassie Gift
- Released: January 2015
- Genre: Feature film soundtrack
- Language: Kannada
- Label: Anand Audio

The music for the film and soundtracks were composed by Jassie Gift. The soundtrack album consists of 6 tracks and was leaked on the internet prior to the release.

The song "Life is Awesome" was reused in the Odia movie Jaga Hatare Pagha.

Tracklist
No.	Title	Lyrics	Singer(s)	Length
1.	"Ninnanda Nodalendu"	Shivananje Gowda	Karthik, Supriya Lohith	4:34
2.	"Nannedeya Pustaka"	Shivananje Gowda	Jassie Gift, Akanksha Badami	5:22
3.	"Marethu Bidu"	Manjunatha Rao	Jassie Gift, Sharanya	6:14
4.	"Maleye Maleye"	Manjunatha Rao	Haricharan	3:50
5.	"Life is Awesome"	Hrudaya Shiva	Santhosh Venky	3:37
6.	"Bulbul Mathadakilva"	Hrudaya Shiva	Jassie Gift, Supriya Lohith	3:54

== Release ==
After several postponement, the film was reported to be finally releasing on 7 August 2015. The film's producer and distributor, RS Productions' Srinivas announced the film would release in the first week of August.

=== Critical reception ===
A critic from Bangalore Mirror wrote that "Male is an entertaining watch. But one that persuades you to watch with a partner".
