= Amulya =

Indian actress

- Born: Moulya; Bangalore, Karnataka, India
- Occupation: Actress
- Years active: 2001–2017
- Spouse: Jagadish (m. 2017)

Amulya (born as Moulya) is a former Indian actress who appears in Kannada films. She made her debut as a child artist in the early 2000s and appeared in a lead role in 2007 with Cheluvina Chittara. She has established herself as one of the popular actress in the Kannada industry at a very young age. She is best known for her roles in the commercially successful films Chaitrada Chandrama (2008), Naanu Nanna Kanasu (2010) and Shravani Subramanya (2013). For the last of these, she won the Filmfare Award for Best Actress – Kannada and SIIMA Critics Award for Best Actress – Kannada.

== Early life ==
Amulya was born as Moulya in Bengaluru, Karnataka. Her father worked as a head clerk in Seshadripuram Main College until he died in 2009. Her mother, Jayalaksmi, is a housewife who Amulya resides with in Bangalore. She has an older brother, Deepak Aras, who directed her 2011 film Manasology. Her first appearance on-screen came as a six-year-old in a Kannada television soap opera, Supta Manasina Sapta Swaragalu. She describes her childhood as a "busy" one, having involved herself in sports and music alongside academics. While in school, she trained as Bharatanatyam dancer and has obtained a green belt in Karate. She completed her pre-university course in commerce from Mount Carmel College, Bangalore. In 2014, she obtained a Bachelor of Commerce (B.Com.) degree from the same college.

== Career ==
Amulya made her debut in films as a child artist in the 2001 Kannada film Parva that had Vishnuvardhan playing the lead role. Her debut as a lead actress came in the 2007 film Cheluvina Chittara opposite Ganesh which was successful at the box-office. She then appeared in Chaitrada Chandrama, Premism, Naanu Nanna Kanasu and Manasology which did moderate business or failed at the box-office. But, Amulya's performances received critical acclaim. After a two-year hiatus, she appeared in the 2013 hit film Shravani Subramanya opposite Ganesh with her performance receiving appreciation from critics. In the same year, she was given the title 'Golden Queen' by her co-star of Shravani Subramanya, Ganesh. Her performance in the film won her, her first Filmfare Award, the award for Best Actress.

Amulya's first film in 2015, Khushi Khushiyagi, saw her being paired opposite Ganesh for the third time. Critics praised her performance as Nandini; G. S. Kumar of The Times of India wrote, "Shades of 'Shravani Subramanya' are visible in Amulya's role, who essays a stellar role..." In Male, she was cast in tomboyish role as Varsha, and was paired opposite Prem Kumar. In her second release of the year, a romance-drama, Ramleela, she played Chandrakala, the sister of a don, and the love interest of Chiranjeevi Sarja. The film received mixed response from critics. In her first release of 2016, Maduveya Mamatheya Kareyole, she portrayed "a meaty character that allows to ride a Bullet". As Kushi, she was paired opposite Suraj (played by Suraj Gowda), in the family drama-romance film, who she ends up marrying confronting certain familial issues and upon the wishes of their respective parents. The Times of India called her performance a "versatile" one.

In February 2016, The New Indian Express reported that Amulya was approached by the makers of Mass Leader to play the role of Shiva Rajkumar's sister. It is to be directed by Sahana Murthy. She also confirmed signing Nagashekar's Maasti Gudi that would see her playing the female lead opposite Duniya Vijay.

== Personal life ==
Amulya married Jagadish in 2017. Amulya is having 2 kids Atharv and Adhav born in March 2022.

== Filmography ==
Year	Film	Role	Notes
2002	Parva		Child artist
2003	Chandu		Child artist
2003	Laali Haadu		Child artist
2005	Maharaja		Child artist
2006	Mandya		Child artist
2006	Suntaragaali	Rajahuli's daughter	Uncredited role
2006	Sajni	Vikram's sister	Child artist
2006	Namma Basava		Child artist
2006	Tananam Tananam		Credited as Maulya
2006	Kallarali Hoovagi	Uma	Credited as Maulya
2007	Thimma		Child artist
2007	Cheluvina Chittara	Aishwarya "Aisu"	Debut as lead actress Udaya Award for Best Actress
2008	Chaitrada Chandrama	Ammu	
2009	Maleyali Jotheyali	Aishu	Cameo
2010	Premism	Amoolya D'Souza	
2010	Naanu Nanna Kanasu	Kanasu	
2011	Manasology	Sihi	
2013	Shravani Subramanya	Shravani	Filmfare Award for Best Actress – Kannada; Nominated—SIIMA Award for Best Actress (Kannada)
2014	Gajakesari	Meera	
2015	Khushi Khushiyagi	Nandini	
2015	Male	Varsha	
2015	Ramleela	Chandrakala	
2016	Maduveya Mamatheya Kareyole	Kushi	
2016	Krishna-Rukku	Rukmini	
2017	Maasthi Gudi	Bhavya	
2017	Mugulu Nage	Pulakeshi's wife	Cameo
