= Bhuvann Ponnannaa =

Indian film actor

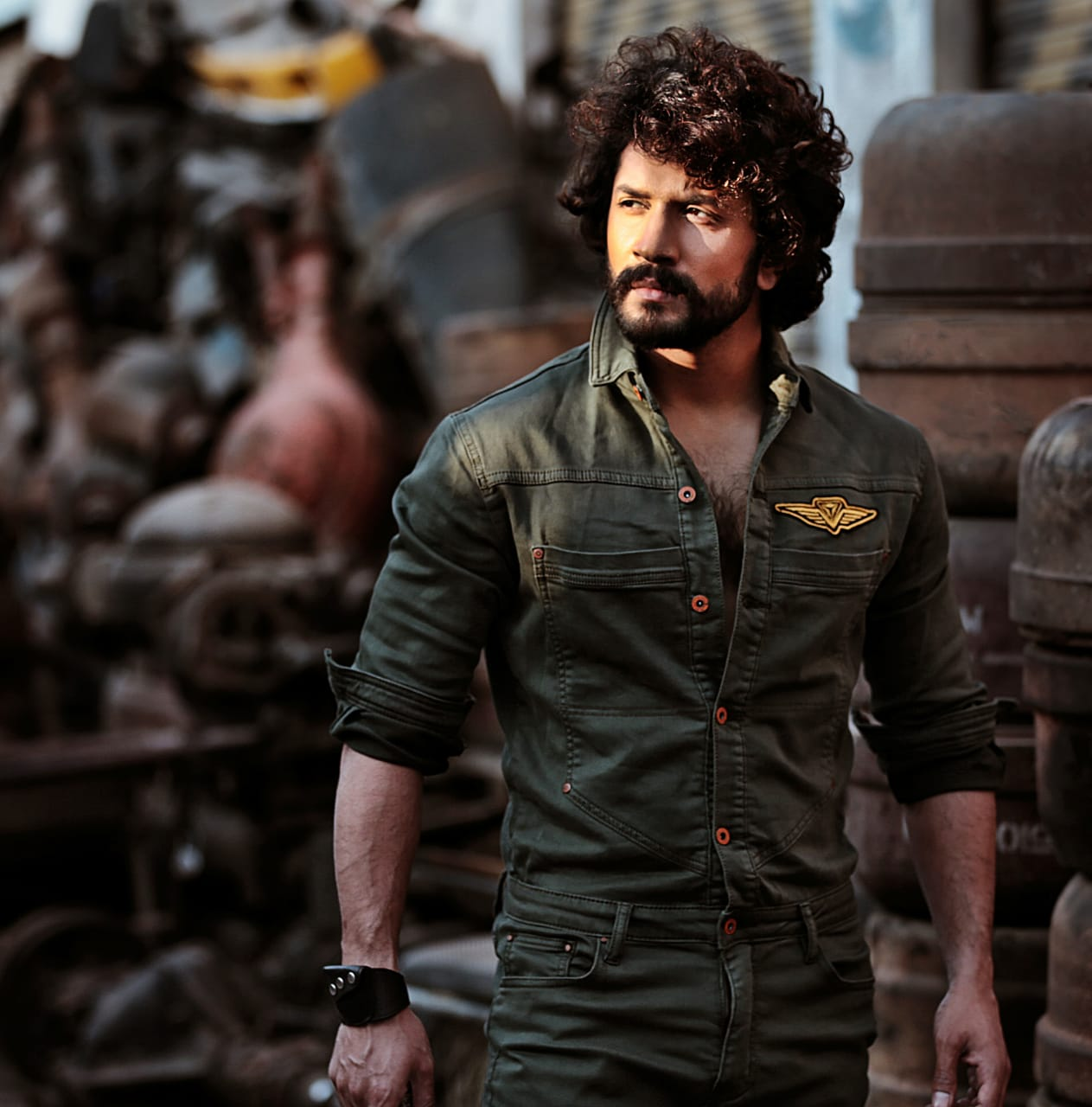
- Ponnannaa while filming with Randhawa, 2019
- Born: 30 December
- Other name: Bhuvan Ponnanna
- Occupations: Actor, model
- Years active: 2009–present
- Spouse: Harshika Poonacha
- Children: 1

Bhuvann Ponnannaa is an Indian actor who predominantly appears in Kannada films. He is best known as a contestant in the reality television show Bigg Boss Kannada. In 2012, he became a full-time actor and has since appeared in films such as Kool...Sakkath Hot Maga (2012), Kuchikoo Kuchikoo (2018) and Randhawa (2019).

== Career ==
Bhuvann Ponnannaa's first on-screen appearance came in a guest role in Sudeep's 2010 Kannada film Just Maath Maathalli. He subsequently played an antagonist in Kool...Sakkath Hot Maga (2012) and Kuchiku Kuchiku (2018) interspersed between appearances in television soaps. He was a contestant in the fourth season of the Kannada reality television show Bigg Boss.

In 2019, Ponnannaa appeared in Randhawa, an action-thriller, portraying three characters including a namesake as a prince. As Robert, he played a wildlife photographer, and as Raana, a person with an unpleasant past. Reviewing the film for the Times of India, Sunayana Suresh wrote, "Bhuvann Ponnanaa gives it his best, but one wishes he had a better script to showcase the same talent." A. Sharadhaa of the New Indian Express predicted the film to be Ponnannaa's "turning point as a hero", while adding that he "[got] too careful with his character" leaning "heavily on the script and the director". Ponnannaa suffered a neck and back injury while filming a stunt sequence for the film. Bhuvann Ponnannaa's wife Harshika Poonacha is also kannada actress

== Filmography ==
=== Films ===
Year	Film	Role	Notes
2010	Just Maath Maathalli	Siddharth's bandmate	
2012	Kool: Sakkath Hot Maga	Raki	
2012	Manjunatha BA LLB		
2018	Kuchiku Kuchiku	Bhuvan	
2019	Randhawa	Randhawa / Robert	

=== Television ===
- Sanju Mattu Naanu (2017)
