= Kushi (2000 film) =

2000 Indian film by S. J. Suryah

- Theatrical release poster
- Directed by: S. J. Suryah
- Written by: S. J. Suryah
- Produced by: A. M. Rathnam
- Starring: Vijay; Jyothika
- Cinematography: Jeeva
- Edited by: B. Lenin; V. T. Vijayan
- Music by: Deva
- Production company: Sri Surya Movies
- Distributed by: Shakthi Film Factory
- Release date: 19 May 2000
- Running time: 178 minutes 170 minutes (after cut)
- Country: India
- Language: Tamil

Kushi (transl. Happiness) is a 2000 Indian Tamil-language romantic comedy film written and directed by S. J. Suryah and produced by A. M. Rathnam. The film stars Vijay and Jyothika in the lead roles, while Mumtaj, Vijayakumar, Vivek and Nizhalgal Ravi and others in the supporting roles. The film's cinematography was done by Jeeva, while music was composed by Deva.

Kushi released on 19 May 2000 and was commercially successful. The film's Telugu version, also titled Kushi (2001), was initially planned as a bilingual along with the Tamil version, but released a year later due to production delays. The film was remade in Hindi as Khushi (2003), and in Kannada as Eno Onthara (2010). Jyothika won several Best Actress awards at various Award Ceremony including Filmfare Award.

== Plot ==
The movie begins with the birth of the protagonists, Shiva (in Calcutta, West Bengal) and Jennifer "Jenny" aka Selvi (in Kuttralam, Tirunelveli district, Tamil Nadu). During their childhood, they encounter each other several times, though they don't know each other. When Shiva turns 21, he decides to pursue his higher studies in Canada, much to his mother's disappointment, who is worried about him and wants him to stay in Calcutta. But while on the way to the airport, he meets with an accident and fractures his leg, forcing him to give up his dreams of studying abroad. At the same time, Jenny wants to pursue her post-graduation, but this is opposed by her father Pandiyan, who wants her to get married. But when Jenny's marriage gets canceled as the groom runs away on the night before the wedding to elope with his lover, Pandiyan agrees to let Jenny pursue higher studies, on the condition that she gets married once she completes her education.

Shiva and Jenny both enroll in Madras Christian College, but in different classes. They meet each other at a temple and soon become close friends. Shiva's friend Babu is in love with Jenny's friend Shanthi. They both work together to unite their friends. But one day, Jenny catches Shiva staring at her waist while she is studying. A heated argument ensues, following which both Shiva and Jenny end their friendship.

Shiva and Jenny try to avoid each other, but can't as Shanthi's father Ambareesh, a powerful and influential industrialist and politician, has found out about his daughter's relationship with Babu, and goes to great lengths to avoid the couple from meeting each other. Shiva and Jenny are forced to work together to help Babu and Shanthi meet each other, despite Ambareesh's opposition. When Shiva is caught trying to sneak Babu into Shanthi's house, Ambareesh sends his men to attack Shiva. When one of the men attempts to stab Shiva, Jenny attempts to save Shiva, but in the process, she cuts her hand and loses consciousness due to heavy bleeding. Shiva gets Jenny admitted to the hospital, where she soon recovers. It is at this stage that both Shiva and Jenny realize they are in love with each other but refuse to admit it. Shiva pretends to accept the sexual overtures of the college bombshell Anita, just to make Jenny jealous.

Meanwhile, Ambareesh tries to get Shanthi forcibly married to someone else. Shiva finds out and sneaks Shanthi out of the wedding hall, thus stopping the wedding. Shanthi and Babu get married at a register office with the support of Shiva and Jenny. Before leaving for their honeymoon, Babu and Shanthi advise them to sort out their relationship. When both Shiva and Jenny complete their post-graduation and leave for their respective hometowns, they attempt to contact each other by phone to declare their love but fail. Shiva rushes to the Chennai Egmore railway station (where Jenny is to board a train to Tirunelveli), while at the same time, Jenny goes to the Chennai Central railway station (where Shiva is to board a train to Calcutta). They miss each other, but they write a letter declaring their love for each other and hand it over to their co-passengers on the train which they are respectively going to board. Jenny reaches her village the following morning in a sad mood, but soon is in for a surprise; she is to marry none other than Shiva that day. Shiva had read Jenny's letter and then informed Pandiyan about their relationship, who agreed to get them married. The movie ends with Shiva and Jenny happily hugging and kissing each other.

== Cast ==
- Vijay as Shiva
- Jyothika as Jennifer "Jenny" alias Selvi
- Vijayakumar as Samarasa Pandiyan, Jennifer's father
- Mumtaj as Anita
- Vivek as Vicky
- Nizhalgal Ravi as Shiva's father
- Beena Banerjee as Shiva's mother
- Janaki Sabesh as Jennifer's mother
- Nagendra Prasad as Babu, Shiva's friend
- Karishma Singh as Shanti, Jenny's friend and Babu's girlfriend
- Rajan P. Dev as MP Ambareesh, Shanti's father
- Jaya Murali as a Doctor
- Besant Ravi as Ambareesh's henchman
- Manish Borundia as Shiva's friend
- S. J. Suryah in a cameo appearance as a pedestrian in Kolkata
- Sridhar as dancer in "Macarena"
- Shilpa Shetty as Macarena, Shiva's best friend (cameo appearance for the song "Macarena")
- Shobi as dancer in "Macarena"
- Japan Kumar as dancer in "Macarena" and "Oru Ponnu Onnu"
- Shaam as Shiva's friend (uncredited)
- Ravi Mariya as man at the temple (uncredited)

== Production ==
After watching the premiere show of Vaalee, Rathnam offered S. J. Suryah an opportunity to direct his next venture with Vijay and Jyothika being signed on soon after. They cast Vijay for the Tamil version and Pawan Kalyan for the Telugu version. As Kalyan was busy with the production of Badri (2000) at the time, the Telugu version got delayed by a year while the Tamil version released in 2000.

Jyothika was cast as the female lead, although Ameesha Patel was initially considered. Vijay began shooting for the film during the same time he was shooting Fazil's Kannukkul Nilavu and revealed how hard it had been to shift between the two characters he was portraying.

Early reports indicated that the film would portray an illicit relationship where a young widowed mother (Mumtaz) would lust for the lover (Vijay) of her own daughter (Jyothika). The producer rubbished the rumors claiming that the film would be a romantic comedy. For the role of a mysterious man in Calcutta that appears twice in the film, Jeeva recommended Suryah after they couldn't find anyone else for the role.

== Soundtrack ==
The soundtrack was composed by Deva, while Vairamuthu penned the lyrics for the songs. "Mottu Ondru" is based on "Why You Wanna Trip on Me" by Michael Jackson, and "Oh Vennila" is based on the Portuguese song "Canção do Mar" sung by Dulce Pontes for Primal Fear (1996). Venky of Chennai Online wrote, "The one who lets us down is the composer. But if you ignore the element of imitation, you have a fairly enjoyable score". Indiainfo wrote "The combination of director Surya and music director Deva gave viewers good music in Vaalee. Deva has once again wielded his baton in Surya's Kushy to come up with some appealing tunes. Though some tunes remind one of some old hits, they go well with today's generation".

Track listing
No.	Title	Singer(s)	Length
1.	"Megam Karukuthu"	Harini	6:04
2.	"Macarena Macarena"	Devan, Sowmya Raoh, S. J. Suryah	6:40
3.	"Oru Ponnu Onnu"	Hariharan, Anuradha Sriram	5:36
4.	"Mottu Ondru (Yaar Solvatho)"	Hariharan, Sadhana Sargam	6:07
5.	"Kattipudi Kattipudida"	Shankar Mahadevan, Vasundhara Das	5:41
6.	"Oh Vennila"	Unnikrishnan, Anuradha Sriram	5:12
Total length:			35:20

== Release and reception ==
The producers initially readied themselves to release the film on April 14, 2000, but pushed dates back to accommodate the release of bigger budget ventures such as Alai Payuthey and Kandukondain Kandukondain. The film eventually released on 19 May 2000.

Rediff.com felt that "overall, the light, airy romance of Kushi works just right for the holiday season, with an appeal calculated for the teen and family audiences", praising the director's story-telling. Ananda Vikatan rated the film 40 out of 100. Tamil Star wrote, "Vijay puts in all the right expressions. Jyotika, making faces at the camera, looks so cute. But, then, a whole movie of about 2 ½ hours cannot be sustained by cute and right expressions alone". Krishna Chidambaram of Kalki wrote that since the love has been narrated peripherally we do not feel the tension of whether lovers will unite or not. The Hindu wrote "SO WHAT'S new or innovative about a boy born and brought up in Calcutta meeting a girl from down South and falling in love? Such a flimsy bottom line is bound to make the rest of the structure shaky. And this is where director S.J. Surya flounders".

The Hindu featured the film as runner-up in their list of top Tamil films in 2000, placing it behind Vikraman's Vanathaippola.

== Accolades ==
Award	Category	Recipient	Result	Ref.
48th Filmfare Awards South	Filmfare Award for Best Director – Tamil	SJ Suryah	Won	
48th Filmfare Awards South	Filmfare Award for Best Actress – Tamil	Jyothika	Won	
Cinema Express Awards	Cinema Express Award for Best Sensational Actress	Jyothika	Won	
Tamil Nadu State Film Awards	Tamil Nadu State Film Award for Best Music Director	Deva	Won	
Dinakaran Film Awards	Dinakaran Film Awards for Best Actress	Jyothika	Won	

== Remakes and legacy ==
The film's Telugu version, also titled Kushi (2001), was initially planned as a bilingual along with the Tamil version, but released a year later due to production delays. The film starring Pawan Kalyan and Bhumika Chawla also similarly won positive reviews and commercial success.

Surya also directed the Hindi version of the film in 2003 as Khushi for producer Boney Kapoor, starring Fardeen Khan and Kareena Kapoor. The success of the lead pair's chemistry prompted Vijay and Jyothika to team up again in 2003 for Thirumalai, while the director and actor briefly reunited for a project titled Puli in 2005, before Vijay opted out. In an interview prior to the release of Anbe Aaruyire (2005), Surya revealed that the film was "like a sequel to Kushi". It was also remade in Kannada as Eno Onthara (2010) starring Ganesh and Priyamani
