= Porki =

2010 Indian film by M. D. Sridhar

- Poster
- Directed by: M. D. Sridhar
- Screenplay by: M. D. Shridhar
- Story by: Puri Jagannadh
- Based on: Pokiri (Telugu)
- Produced by: Ganesh Kasaragod, Santhosh Pal
- Starring: Darshan; Pranitha Subhash; Ashish Vidyarthi
- Cinematography: A. V. Krishna Kumar
- Edited by: P. R. Sounder Raj
- Music by: V. Harikrishna
- Production company: Datta Creations
- Distributed by: Jayanna Films
- Release date: 14 January 2010
- Running time: 154 minutes
- Country: India
- Language: Kannada
- Budget: ₹ 7 crore

Porki (English: Rogue) is a 2010 Indian Kannada-language action thriller film directed by M. D. Sridhar, starring Darshan, Pranitha Subhash and Ashish Vidyarthi in the lead roles. It is a remake of the 2006 Telugu film Pokiri. Ashish Vidyarthi, who played the role of sub-inspector in the original, played the role of the main villain in the Kannada remake.

The film completed a 100-day run in theatres. Two years later, it was dubbed in Hindi as Main Hoon Wanted and in Bhojpuri as Hamaar Bhai Dabang.

== Plot ==
In Bangalore, two rival mafia gangs headed by Australia-based on Ali Bhai and Satyaraj resort to criminal activities such as extortion, contract, and coercion to take control of the city. The new DCP, Abdul Azem Sher Khan, focuses on making Bangalore a better place by working on arresting all of them. Dattu, a thug working for money and living in Bangalore along with his friends, is hired by Satyaraj to beat up Ali Bhai's henchmen Magadi Manja. He later joins Ali Bhai's gang for monetary reasons. He falls in love with Anjali, an aerobics master, who initially rejects his advances. Anjali lives with her widowed mother and brother and her neighbor Sadhu, a software engineer, who pesters her to marry him. A corrupt SI named Umesh Reddy, who works for Ali Bhai, lusts after Anjali. He is determined to make her his mistress, undeterred by Anjali's multiple rejections. After Dattu kills a henchman of Satyaraj, He is confronted by Umesh Reddy and is able to prevent Anjali from being molested. She meets him the next day to thank him, and Dattu introduces himself as a self-employed person who undertakes any activity for money. They develop unspoken feelings for each other angering Umesh Reddy.

Anjali's employer, Satya Narayana Murthy suggests that she marry the man she loves. To escape from Umesh Reddy's advances, she meets Dattu and proposes to him. After an attack by Satyaraj's henchmen, who are murdered by Dattu, He reveals himself as a remorseless assassin and suggests that she might want to rethink her proposal. After Anjali distances herself from Dattu, Umesh Reddy frames her with a mock assault by a few gangsters unbeknownst to her family and the local residents, intending to ruin her life and subsequently force her to be his mistress. Learning this, Dattu beats up Umesh Reddy and warns him that he will face dire consequences if he is found guilty of being involved. Ali Bhai visits Bangalore and assassinates Satyaraj. He meets Dattu to discuss the murder of a minister by blowing up children's balloons. Dattu rejects this as it would involve killing innocents. In the middle of their argument, the police raids the club and arrests Ali Bhai. His gang members retaliate by kidnapping Khan's daughter, drugging her and creating a Lascivious video of her which they threaten to release to the media if Ali Bhai is not released, forcing the embattled Khan to release Ali Bhai. However, in her drugged state, Khan's daughter reveals that her father had placed an undercover officer as a mole in Ali Bhai's gang.

The gang members find out that an IPS officer by the name of Suryanarayana Murthy, the son of a retired Inspector Satya Narayana Murthy, has gone undercover to finish off the underworld mafia gangs and is now a part of their gang. Ali Bhai kills Ganesh, believing he is Surya Narayana Murthy. However, it is revealed that Ganesh was actually Satya Narayana Murthy's adopted son. Ali Bhai then kills Satya Narayana Murthy to lure the real Surya Narayana Murthy. When Surya Narayana Murthy actually turns up, everyone, especially Anjali and Umesh Reddy are shocked to see that he is none other than Dattu. After Satya Narayana Murthy and Ganesh's cremation, Dattu forces Umesh Reddy to call Ali Bhai to find out his location, which is Binny Mills. Dattu arrives at Binny Mills and starts to kill Ali Bhai's gang members one by one, rescuing Khan's daughter in the process. In a final confrontation, Dattu kills Ali Bhai by slashing his throat with a broken glass window and shoots Umesh Reddy by saying the following words: Ond sali commit adhre nann maat nanne kelala (transl. Once I get committed, I won't listen even to my own words) baby shark

== Cast ==
- Darshan as Surya Narayan IPS / Dattu
- Pranitha Subhash as Anjali Iyer
- Ashish Vidyarthi as Ali Bhai
- Devaraj as ACP Abdul Azem Sher Khan
- Avinash as Satya Narayan Murthy, Dattu / Surya Narayan's father
- Shobharaj as SI Umesh Reddy
- Sadhu Kokila as Sadhu, software engineer
- Tennis Krishna as Beggar's association Vice-president
- Sangeetha Shetty as Mona
- Suryanarayan Waali as Guru
- Dharma as 'Magadi' Manja
- Manoj
- Chitra Shenoy as Lakshmi, Anjali's mother
- Sharan as Beggar's association president
- Srujan Lokesh as Ganesh, Dattu / Surya Narayan's adoptive brother
- Sharath Lohitashwa as Sathyaraj
- Ravi Varma
- Chandan Naik
- Jai Ram
- Santhosh Pai
- Tumkur Mohan
- Suresh Anchan
- Vijaya Sarathi
- Hanumanthegowda
- Vinayak Ram Kalagaru
- Kadabagere Srinivas

== Music ==
The music of the film was composed by V.Harikrishna and the lyrics were written by V.Nagendra Prasad. The song "Dheera Dheera" is remade from "Dol Dol" from Pokiri.

No.	Title	Lyrics	Music	Singer(s)	Length
1.	"Heegu Untaa"	V. Nagendra Prasad	V. Harikrishna	Kunal Ganjawala, Chorus	3:35
2.	"Sakkathagavle Sumne Nagthale"	V. Nagendra Prasad	V. Harikrishna	V. Harikrishna, Chorus	4:03
3.	"Dheera Dheera Baa Sara Sara"	Kaviraj	Mani Sharma	Karthik, Priya Himesh	4:15
4.	"Daane Daane Daiyya"	V. Nagendra Prasad	V. Harikrishna	Tippu, Sowmya Mahadevan	3:20
5.	"Oorella Nanna Porki Andru"	V. Nagendra Prasad	V. Harikrishna	Rahul Nambiar, Priya Himesh	4:01

== Release ==
The film received an 'A' (Adults Only) certificate from the CBFC for containing obscene and bold sequences and excessive violence. After few changes, it was recertified U/A by the Indian Censor Board, upon its release.

=== Home media ===
The film was released on DVD and VCD by Anand Audio. The film's satellite rights were sold to Star Suvarna.

=== Dubbed versions ===
The film was dubbed and released in Hindi as "Main Hoon Wanted" (2012) and in Bhojpuri as "Hamar Bhai Dabbang" by Goldmines Telefilms despite the Hindi remake.

== Reception ==
=== Critical response ===
R G Vijayasarathy of Rediff.com scored the film at 2.5 out of 5 stars and says "Porki is an out and out Darshan film. He doesn't disappoint his fans in the dialogue or action sections, especially in the second half. Sharan provides comic relief at regular and much needed intervals. Lending him support are Sadhu Kokila and Tennis Krishna. Ashish Vidyarthi, who plays cop in Telugu Pokiri, is seen here as mafia king Ali Bhai. Dharma makes his presence felt as a gangster". A critic from The New Indian Express wrote "Darshan has also put in his best efforts to showcase his dancing skills. But one has to admit that his performance is not up to the mark in the emotional sequence where he loses his father and one of his close friends". A critic from Deccan Herald wrote "Yet, it must be said that some of the native sensibilities do not allow vulgarity take over and, would eventually render any such depiction a farce. The actors are perfectly cast. Harikrishna and Krishnakumar offer readymade dry food, with money well-spent. Ashish Vidyarthi has little scope to grate on the nerves and Shobhraj is believable". A critic from The Times of India scored the film at 3 out of 5 stars and wrote "Hats off to Darshan for his brilliant performance in action sequences. While Pranitha fails to impress, Devaraj, Dharma and Avinash put up a good show. The comedy tracks of Sharan and Sadhu Kokila are okay. Music by V Harikrishna is average; Krishna Kumar's camerawork is marvellous and dialogues by B A Madhu are impressive". A critic from Bangalore Mirror wrote "Music composer’s work is the best element in the film. For some strange reason, the film at times looks like the 3D version of Avatar without the glasses. If you enjoy action films with lots of bullets. this is the film for you".
