= A Aa (soundtrack) =

A Aa (Original Motion Picture Soundtrack)

Soundtrack album by Mickey J. Meyer
- Released: 1 May 2016
- Recorded: 2016
- Genre: Feature film soundtrack
- Length: 17:53
- Language: Telugu
- Label: Aditya Music
- Producer: Mickey J. Meyer

Mickey J. Meyer chronology
Brahmotsavam (2016)	A Aa (Original Motion Picture Soundtrack) (2016)	Okka Ammayi Thappa (2016)

A Aa (Original Motion Picture Soundtrack) is the soundtrack to the 2016 Telugu-language romantic drama film of the same name directed by Trivikram Srinivas and starring Nithiin and Samantha Ruth Prabhu. The film's soundtrack featured five songs composed by Mickey J. Meyer and lyrics written by Ramajogayya Sastry and Krishna Chaitanya. The soundtrack was released under the Aditya Music label on 1 May 2016, at a launch event held in Shilpakala Vedika, Hyderabad.

== Background ==
The soundtrack was initially set to be composed by Anirudh Ravichander, but was later replaced by Mickey J. Meyer following the latter's exit due to his conflicting schedules in Tamil films. Meyer composed five songs for the film which had lyrics written by Ramajogayya Sastry and Krishna Chaitanya. K. S. Chithra, Abhay Jodhpurkar, Ramya Behara, Rahul Nambiar, Karthik, Roll Rida, Sravana Bhargavi, Anjana Sowmya and Sai Shivani performed vocals for the songs.

== Release ==
The film's music was initially scheduled to be held on 15 April 2016 but was postponed to late April. Eventually, the album was released on 1 May 2016, at a launch event in Shilpakala Vedika at Hyderabad, with actor Pawan Kalyan attending as chief guest. The album released in a jukebox format through YouTube, before the launch and got more than 1 million views on the video-sharing platform.

== Reception ==
The audio received positive reviews from critics. Behindwoods gave 2.75 out of 5 stating that the album is a "whiff of fresh air from Mickey J Meyer in the midst of heavy duty albums". Sravana Bhargavi of The Times of India gave 4 out of 5 and stated "The album is a winner in terms of the variety that Mickey brings to the table." Indiaglitz gave 3.25 out of 5 stating that "The album comes with good situational songs." Karthik Srinivasan of Milliblog reviewed it as "a simple and modest soundtrack from Mickey J Meyer". Ramesh Kannan of Moviecrow gave 3 out of 5 stating it as an "ear-pleasing album far from regular commercial potboilers". Sangeetha Devi Dundoo of The Hindu called the music "refreshing". Latha Srinivasan of Daily News and Analysis reviewed that except for the song "Rang De", the other tracks did not make up the mark.

== Legacy ==
The song "Rang De" inspired the 2021 film of the same name directed by Venky Atluri, and also starred Nithiin.

== Track listing ==
A Aa (Original Motion Picture Soundtrack) track listing
No.	Title	Lyrics	Artist(s)	Length
1.	"Yaa Yaa"	Ramajogayya Sastry	K.S. Chithra, Abhay Jodhpurkar, Anjana Sowmya, Sai Shivani	4:00
2.	"Rang De"	Ramajogayya Sastry	Ramya Behara, Rahul Nambiar, Sai Shivani	4:01
3.	"Anasuya Kosam"	Krishna Chaitanya	Karthik, Roll Rida	3:25
4.	"Mummy Returns"	Ramajogayya Sastry	Sravana Bhargavi	2:53
5.	"Yellipoke Syamala"	Ramajogayya Sastry	Karthik	3:35
Total length:				17:53

== Accolades ==
Accolades for A Aa (Original Motion Picture Soundtrack)
Award (Note: Awards are in alphabetical order.)	Date of ceremony (Note: Date is linked to the article about the awards held that year, wherever possible.)	Category	Recipient(s)	Result	Ref.
Filmfare Awards South	17 June 2017	Best Music Director – Telugu	Mickey J. Meyer	Nominated	
Filmfare Awards South	17 June 2017	Best Male Playback Singer – Telugu	Karthik for "Yellipoke Shyamala"	Won	
Nandi Awards	14 November 2017	Best Music Director	Mickey J. Meyer	Won (Note: Also for Brahmotsavam and Sathamanam Bhavati)	
South Indian International Movie Awards	30 June–1 July 2017	Best Music Director – Telugu	Mickey J. Meyer	Nominated	
South Indian International Movie Awards	30 June–1 July 2017	Best Female Playback Singer – Telugu	Ramya Behara for "Rang De"	Won	
