= Kool: Sakkath Hot Maga =

2011 Indian Kannada-language romance film

- Directed by: Ganesh
- Screenplay by: Parala Shivasubramanyam; Ganesh
- Story by: Parala Shivasubramanyam
- Produced by: Shilpa Ganesh
- Starring: Ganesh; Sana Khan
- Cinematography: R. Rathnavelu
- Edited by: Anthony
- Music by: V. Harikrishna
- Production company: Golden Movies
- Distributed by: Jayanna Films
- Release date: 12 May 2011
- Running time: 152 minutes
- Country: India
- Language: Kannada

Kool: Sakkath Hot Maga is a 2011 Indian Kannada-language romance comedy film starring Ganesh and Sana Khan. The film marks the directorial debut of Ganesh and Kannada acting debut of Khan. Ramakrishna, Sadhu Kokila, Sharan and H. G. Dattatreya feature in supporting roles. The film follows Rahul (Ganesh), a carefree college student whose romance with Kajal (Khan) takes an unexpected turn after a tragic incident separates them.

The film was produced by Ganesh's wife, Shilpa, under the home banner Golden Movies. Ganesh took over the film's direction after a dispute led to the initial director Mussanje Mahesh's walking out. V. Harikrishna composed music and R. Rathnavelu served as cinematographer for the film. Principal photography began in June 2010 and filming completed in February 2011. Upon theatrical release on 12 May 2011, the film received generally negative reviews from critics who criticized the screenplay and the direction. It was called a rehash of Kaho Naa... Pyaar Hai (2000) and Ratha Sapthami (1986). The film also failed to perform commercially.

== Plot ==
Rahul is a carefree college student known for his mischievous behaviour along with his friends which includes Suresh, Charlie and Raki. During his time at college, he falls in love with Kajal, a new student who initially dislikes his immature antics. Despite frequent involvement in trouble, Rahul gradually wins Kajal over, especially after rescues her from a group of miscreants. The two soon begin a romantic relationship.

On Valentine's Day, Rahul waits for Kajal at a designated meeting spot, but she fails to arrive. While waiting by the roadside, Rahul is struck by a truck and is critically injured. He is taken to a hospital, where doctors declare him dead. Kajal is devastated by the incident and struggles to cope with the loss. Hoping that a change of environment will help her recover, her parents send her to stay with her grandparents at the hill station of Hasirubetta.

While staying there, Kajal encounters Manohar Jaraganahalli "MJ", a musician and aspiring pop singer living in the outhouse of her grandparents' home. She is shocked to discover that MJ closely resembles Rahul. Although disturbed by the resemblance, she finds herself unable to completely ignore him despite rejecting his romantic advances. She eventually reveals to him that she had deliberately avoided meeting Rahul on Valentine's Day after being told by a man claiming to be the brother of Rahul's former girlfriend Kirti that Rahul had murdered Kirti and disguised the death as a suicide after refusing to marry her.

It is later revealed that MJ is actually Rahul himself, who survived the accident. Rahul explains that he adopted the identity of MJ in order to uncover the reason behind the attempt on his life after learning that the truck driver responsible for the accident had been hired to kill him. Curious to know the reason behind Kajal's alleged involvement, Rahul intentionally approached her grandparents under a false identity and stayed nearby to learn the truth. Rahul later discovers that his friend Raki is the real mastermind behind both Kirti's death and the attempt on his own life. Obsessed with Kajal and jealous of Rahul, Raki confesses that he murdered Kirti and manipulated Kajal into fearing Rahul. A confrontation follows between Rahul and Raki, ending with the latter falling to his death from a hillside. Rahul and Kajal are eventually reunited.

== Cast ==
- Ganesh as Rahul and Manohar Jaraganahalli "MJ"
- Sana Khan as Kajal
- Ramakrishna as Rahul's father
- Sadhu Kokila as Sadhu Nanda
- Sharan as Suresh
- H. G. Dattatreya as Sundaram, Kajal's grandfather
- Kishori Ballal as Kajal's grandmother
- Veena Sundar as Kajal's mother
- Sunetra Pandit as lady in market
- Sangeetha Shetty as "Sammy", lecturer in college
- Honnavalli Krishna as a sorcerer
- Mohan Juneja as truck driver
- Mithra as Mithra, Sadhu Nanda's cousin
- R. G. Vijayasarathy as Fakirappa, peon in college
- Ganesh Rao as B. N. Raghunath, college principal
- Mysore Jadhav as watchman in college
- Bhuvann Ponnannaa as Raki, Rahul's friend
- Niranjan Deshpande as Charlie, Rahul's friend

== Production ==
=== Development ===
The film was first announced in mid 2010. Its title was requested by Ganesh from fans through Bangalore Mirror in May 2010, starting with the alphabet K or Ka (in Kannada). Upon a fan named Chaitra B.'s suggestion, the title Kool was chosen. The makers then went with the kicker Sakath Hot Maga as a suffix to Kool. It was reported that filming would begin on 21 June, and that Mussanje Mahesh would direct the film and that Ganesh'w wife Shlipa would produce it, under the banner Golden Movies. It was her second film after Maleyali Jotheyali (2009), which also stars Ganesh. The story for the film was written by an Andhra Pradesh-based writer, who wrote a total of 15 versions of the story. The screenplay and some dialogues were written by Ganesh.

=== Casting and controversy ===
Aamna Sharif was first reportedly signed as the female lead opposite Ganesh for Kool. It was reported that Ganesh would play a college-goer and that he had reduced three kilograms in preparation for the role. He stated, "I was a big prankster in college and each day was great fun. In the film too, the first half will reflect the fun days. The second half is interesting as it is then that the knots formed in the first half of the story get untangled." Ganesh added that the film would be shot in Leh apart from Bangalore and Mysore. R. Rathnavelu, who had previously worked with Ganesh in Gaalipata (2008), was hired as the cinematographer. A few days later, it was reported that Sharif was replaced by Sana Khan as the female lead on the film and that filming had begun in Ooty.

Some sources suggested that this recasting led to a dispute between the director and producer leading to the former's walkout from the film. However, other sources reported that the director Mahesh had creative differences with the cinematographer Rathnavelu, which when brought to Shilpa's attention by the former, was asked to "get out". Subsequently, Ganesh replaced him as the director. The dispute was taken to the Karnataka Film Chamber of Commerce which asked producer Shilpa to compensate Mahesh with an amount of ₹1 lakh. However, Mahesh reportedly denied the compensation leading to a deadlock in early August. It was resolved later that month.

=== Filming ===
Filming for Kool began in Ooty in June 2010, in the Lawrence School. After filming in Ooty and Bengaluru, the next schedule took place in October, in Sakleshpur predominantly in a British era bungalow. Another schedule was reported to be shot in Madikeri when the talkie portions would be completed. It was reported that composer V. Harikrishna would then finish recording the soundtrack following which the production team would travel abroad to film the song sequences. The team subsequently travelled to Egypt, Dubai, Jordan and the Middle East, and wrapped up the final schedule in February 201. Shanker, Ramu and Vishnudev served as dance choreographers. The film completed shooting in a total of 72 filming days. The makers reportedly decided to release the film after the 2011 Cricket World Cup.

== Soundtrack ==
Kool: Sakkath Hot Maga

Soundtrack album by V. Harikrishna
- Released: 10 March 2011
- Recorded: 2010–2011
- Length: 23:55
- Label: Think Music

V. Harikrishna scored the film's music and for its soundtrack. The soundtrack album consists of five tracks. The album was released on 10 March 2011 and was distributed by the label Think Music.

All lyrics are written by Kaviraj.

Track listing
No.	Title	Singer(s)	Length
1.	"Chandrana"	Ranjith	5:41
2.	"Coffee Hogonvaa"	Ganesh, Priyadarshini	4:23
3.	"Inky Pinky"	Naveen Madhav	4:38
4.	"Neenu Ninthare"	Shaan, Anuradha Bhat	4:29
5.	"Nodutha Nodutha"	Sonu Nigam	4:44
Total length:			23:55

== Reception ==
The film received generally negative reviews from critics. Shruti Indira Lakshminarayana from Rediff.com scored 2 out of 5 stars and drew comparison between the characters to those in Shah Rukh Khan's films. She added that, "Dialogues are not that impactful. The comedy does not carry through." She also criticized the newcomer actors in that "none of them make a mark". She further wrote, "Rathnavelu's camerawork adds charm to the song, as well as the second half of the film. Watch Kool if you must. And just like the film, the makers leave it to the audience to figure out why the film has been called so! Kool promised to come as a summer respite but instead adds to the heat". A critic from The New Indian Express opined that "the screenplay is the weakest part of the movie." They wrote, "The technical crew has done their job perfectly, but nothing can be recognised much because of a bad story. Calling the film "just an average affair", they were also critical of Sana Khan's acting performance in that she is "expressionless in most of the sequences", while commending Ganesh's acting.

A critic from Bangalore Mirror called the film a "rehash" of Hindi film Kaho Naa... Pyaar Hai (2000) and the Kannada film Ratha Sapthami (1986). They felt that despite the basic premise remaining the same, "the value additions are farcical." They also noted that "no single character is well-defined", and that "[t]hough the film's duration is comparatively shorter, the tedious narration makes it a boring affair." They concluded writing: "Ganesh attempts too many things in this film, making it a mess of everything. He sings, co-writes dialogues, gets his wife to produce the movie. Unwarranted and avoidable." Sharanya C. R. of DNA India wrote, "Unfortunately, what doesn’t quite work is the art of storytelling, which could have been tighter. Ganesh, as a director, is yet to prove his capability but as an actor, he can still rock the screen". Shekhar Hooli of Filmibeat commended Ganesh as an actor and was critical of his direction, screenplay and the narration.
