= Gimmick (film) =

2019 horror-comedy film directed by Naganna

- Theatrical release poster
- Directed by: Naganna
- Produced by: Deepak Samidurai
- Starring: Ganesh; Ronica Singh; Chi. Guru Dutt; Ravishankar Gowda; Shobaraj; Mandya Ramesh
- Cinematography: Vignesh Vasu
- Edited by: Suresh Urs
- Music by: Arjun Janya
- Production company: Samy Pictures
- Distributed by: Jayanna Films
- Release date: 15 August 2019
- Running time: 153 minutes
- Country: India
- Language: Kannada

Gimmick is a 2019 Indian Kannada-language comedy horror film, directed by Naganna and produced by Deepak Samidurai under the banner of Samy Pictures. The film starring Ganesh, Ronica Singh, Chi. Guru Dutt, Shobaraj, Ravishankar Gowda and Sundar Raj is a remake of 2016 Tamil film Dhilluku Dhuddu. The film marks Ronica Singh's debut in the Kannada film industry. The film was released theatrically on 15 August 2019.

The story of the film follows a happy-go-lucky poor guy Gani (Played by Ganesh) and wrestler Raani (played by Ronica Singh), daughter of a rich father, who tries to separate them.

== Cast ==
- Ganesh as Gani
- Ronica Singh as Raani
- Chi. Guru Dutt as Shet, Raani's father
- Ravishankar Gowda as Pratao
- Shobaraj
- Mandya Ramesh as Manic
- Sundar Raj as Pulti Sundar Raj
- Vijay Chendoor

== Production ==
Naganna, the director of the film began the horror comedy with Ganesh, which was filmed at a house in Sri Lanka, Mysuru and Bengaluru. Gimmick cast included Ravi Shankar Gowda, Sadhu Kokila, Shobhraj and Sundar Raj in supporting roles. The film was bankrolled by Deepak Sami under his banner Sami Pictures. The film marked Ronica Singh's debut in the Kannada film industry. The filming was wrapped in January.

== Soundtrack ==
Gimmick

Soundtrack album by Arjun Janya
- Released: 27 May 2019
- Genre: Soundtrack
- Length: 11:29
- Language: Kannada
- Label: Anand Audio

Arjun Janya chronology
Amar (2019)	Gimmick (2019)	Pailwaan (2019)
External audio
- Audio song on YouTube

The soundtrack of the film is composed by Arjun Janya and lyrics by Kaviraj.

All lyrics are written by Kaviraj.

Track list
No.	Title	Singer(s)	Length
1.	"Hudugi Hudugi"	Vyasraj, Manasa Holla, Sunil Gujagonda, Chandan Gupta	3:11
2.	"Lachmi Lachmi"	Sanjith Hegde, Impana Jayaraj	3:35
3.	"Shankari Banashankari"	Vyasraj Sosale and Chorus	4:43
Total length:			11:29

== Marketing and release ==
The official trailer of the film was unveiled on 18 May 2019. The official sneak peek of the film was unveiled on 25 May 2019.

The film was theatrically released on 15 August 2019.

== Reception ==
=== Critical response ===
A Sharadhaa of The New Indian Express opined that music director Ajrun Janya's compositions suited the mood of the film. Praising the cinematography by Vignesh Vasu, Sharadhaa concluded, "In company of ghosts, the horror film with comical twists makes for a one-time-watch." Vinay Lokesh of The Times of India gave three stars out of five and noted that the story took time to come up, but after that there were 'edge-of-the-seat moments' till the end. Lokesh concluded, "The actor excels in his role in this horror-comedy. If you have not watched the original, Gimmick is sure to entertain.
