= Pulival Kalyanam =

2003 Indian film

- VCD cover
- Directed by: Shafi
- Written by: Udayakrishna-Siby K. Thomas
- Produced by: O. P. Unnikrishnan; P. S. Premanandan
- Starring: Jayasurya; Kavya Madhavan; Lal; Lalu Alex; Jagathy Sreekumar; Harisree Ashokan; Salim Kumar; Cochin Haneefa
- Cinematography: P. Sukumar
- Edited by: Hariharaputhran K. P.
- Music by: Berny-Ignatius
- Production company: Govind Films
- Distributed by: Murali Films
- Release date: 25 December 2003 (India)
- Running time: 147 minutes
- Country: India
- Language: Malayalam

Pulival Kalyanam (transl. Tiger tail wedding) is a 2003 Indian Malayalam-language romantic comedy film directed by Shafi and written by Udayakrishna-Siby K. Thomas. The film stars Jayasurya and Kavya Madhavan with Lal, Lalu Alex, Jagathy Sreekumar, Harisree Ashokan, Salim Kumar, and Cochin Haneefa in the supporting roles. The plot follows Harikrishnan, a rustic, whose star-crossed romance with a girl, Ganga, from a rich family, brings inadvertent consequences on the lives of people around them. The music was composed by Berny-Ignatius.

It is considered one of the best comedy films in Malayalam cinema and the character Manavalan developed a cult following in the form of internet memes in Kerala troll community years after release. The film was remade in Kannada as Chellata (2006).

== Plot ==
Harikrishnan is adopted by Karunan and his family at a very young age. Karunan loses his arm in a fireworks accident while trying to save Hari. After this incident, Hari takes up responsibility of the family.

Years later, Hari is a hardworking young man who drives a taxi at the airport while simultaneously studying to be an engineer. Hari's and Karunan's sister, Sreekutti, is in love with Murali their neighbor and the only son of Paramanandam who works for Raghavendra Sett, a businessman. When their relationship is discovered, Paramanandam demands a huge sum of money as dowry to make this marriage happen. Harikrishnan and Karunan take a loan from a financier, Manavalan, and invest it in their fireworks business, only to lose it completely in a fire. Manavalan gets cheated by his employer and returns to Kochi with his cab driver Dharmendran to get back the money he had lend to Hari.

In the meantime, Harikrishnan gets his phone muddled with Ganga, Sett's daughter on account of both the models being the same. He also gets in the bad books of Sett. Hari and Ganga have loads of comical misunderstandings before falling in love and deciding to get married. Their relationship is not acceptable to Raghavendra Sett, and he puts obstacles in their way, thinking Hari is after their money. The rest of the film shows how Hari and Ganga overcome those obstacles with Karunan's help and gets married.

== Cast ==
- Jayasurya as Harikrishnan
  - Arun Kumar as Young Hari
- Kavya Madhavan as Ganga, Hari's love interest
- Lal as Karunan, Hari's adoptive brother and Sreekutty's elder brother
- Lalu Alex as Raghavendra Sett, Ganga's father
- Jagathy Sreekumar as Paramanandam, Raghavendra Sett's manager
- Harisree Ashokan as Theeppori Kuttappan, Hari's and Karunan's friend
- Salim Kumar as Manavalan, a money lender and financer
- Cochin Haneefa as P. Dharmendra, Mumbai Taxi Driver and Manavalan's friend
- Karthika Mathew as Sreekutty, Karunan's younger sister
  - Dimple Rose as Young Sreekutty
- Nishanth Sagar as Ramesh Prasad
- T. P. Madhavan as Prasad, Ramesh's father
- Jose Pellissery as Swamy
- Kulappulli Leela as Kuttappan's mother-in-law
- Ponnamma Babu as Paramanandam's wife
- Kochu Preman as Bank Manager
- Narayanankutty as Taxi Driver, Hari's friend
- Shaju Sreedhar as Murali, Paramanandam's son
- Reena as Doctor
- Priyanka Anoop as Neelambari
- Beena Sabu as Kuttappan's wife
- Irshad as Train Passenger

== Soundtrack ==
The film's soundtrack contains six songs, all composed by Berny Ignatius and lyrics by Kaithapram.

#	Title	Singer(s)
1	"Aaru Paranju"	P Jayachandran, K. S. Chitra
2	"Thottu Thottu Nilkan"	Afsal, Vijay Yesudas, Chorus
3	"Gujarathi"	Vidhu Prathap, Jyotsna, Chorus
4	"Gujarathi (F)"	Jyotsna
5	"Poovallikaavil"	K. J. Yesudas
6	Thevaaratheruvilinnu	M.G. Sreekumar, Afsal, Kalabhavan Mani

== Box office ==
The film was a commercial success at the box office.

== Legacy ==
Pulival Kalyanam is regarded as one of the best comedy films in Malayalam cinema, and several of its dialogues became catchphrases. The characters and scenes are frequently used in trolls. The character Manavalan gained a cult following in the form of internet memes in social media.
