= Adakamaranahalli, Bengaluru =

Adakamaranahalli
- village
- Adakamaranahalli (Bangalore North) is in Bangalore district
- Interactive map of Adakamaranahalli
- Coordinates: 13.0633°N 77.4417°E
- Country: India
- State: Karnataka
- District: Bangalore
- Talukas: Bangalore North

Government
  - Body: Village Panchayat

Languages
  - Official: Kannada
- Time zone: UTC+5:30 (IST)
- PIN: 562 123
- Nearest city: Bangalore
- Civic agency: Village Panchayat

Adakamaranahalli (Bangalore North) is a village in the southern state of Karnataka, India. It is located in the Bangalore North taluk of Bangalore district in Karnataka.

== Demographics ==
As of 2011 India census, Adakamaranahalli had a population of 4,137. Males constitute 2,306 of the population and females 1,831. Kannada is the official and most widely spoken language in Adakamaranahalli. Adakamaranahalli has an average literacy rate of 75.66 percent, higher than the national average of 59.5 percent, with 82.18 percent of the males and 67.45 percent of females literate.

== See also ==
- Bangalore
- Districts of Karnataka
