= Brindavihari =

- Theatrical release poster
- Directed by: Srinivas Raju
- Written by: Srinivas Raju
- Produced by: Samruddhi Manjunath
- Starring: Ganesh; Devika Bhat; Malvika Sharma; Rangayana Raghu
- Cinematography: Venkat R. Prasad
- Edited by: K. M. Prakash
- Music by: Hesham Abdul Wahab
- Production companies: KVC Productions; Virat Sai Creations
- Distributed by: Sri Gagan Distributors
- Release date: 20 November 2026
- Country: India
- Language: Kannada

Brindavihari is a 2026 Indian Kannada‑language romantic drama film written and directed by Srinivas Raju and produced by Samruddhi Manjunath under KVC Productions in association with Virat Sai Creations. The film stars Ganesh, Devika Bhat and Malvika Sharma in the lead, alongside Rangayana Raghu, Lakshmi, Achyuth Kumar and Sadhu Kokila in key supporting roles. The film's score is by Hesham Abdul Wahab, making his debut in Kannada cinema.. The film's cinematography is by Venkat R. Prasad while the editing is by K. M. Prakash.

The core plot of the film was inspired from 1998 Hollywood movie The Truman Show starring Jim Carrey.

The film, originally slated for release in October, was pushed to November 20, 2026.

== Premises ==
Set in Brindavanam, the story follows Madhava, whose heart belongs to Radha. Radha eventually walks away from Madhava, leaving a deep void in his life. A woman named Meera enters Madhava's life. Meera's presence forces Madhava to reevaluate his world, confront his past, and discover what the true nature of love really means.

== Cast ==
- Ganesh as Madhava
- Devika Bhat as Radha
- Malvika Sharma as Meera
- Ramkumar
- Rangayana Raghu
- Lakshmi
- Achyuth Kumar
- Sadhu Kokila
- Avinash

== Music ==
Hesham Abdul Wahab, making his debut in Kannada cinema, composed the soundtrack and background score. The lyrics were written by V. Nagendra Prasad

Track listing
No.	Title	Lyrics	Singer(s)	Length
1.	"Jeeva Jeeva"	V. Nagendra Prasad	Karthik	3:47
2.	"Rama Rama Deva"	V. Nagendra Prasad	Anurag Kulkarni	3:05
3.	"Radha Radha"	V. Nagendra Prasad	Sid Sriram, Chinmayi Sripada	4:02
4.	"Naada Sunaada"	V. Nagendra Prasad	Shreya Ghoshal	3:56
5.	"Ondhe Ondu"	V. Nagendra Prasad	K. S. Chithra, Jaskaran Singh	4:06
6.	"Ee Jeevana Sarigama"	V. Nagendra Prasad	Hesham Abdul Wahab, Aishwarya Rangarajan	4:10
7.	"Kudide Kudide"	V. Nagendra Prasad	Gautam Nair	3:50

== Release and reception ==
The film is set to release theatrically in India on November 20, 2026, in around 1300 screens.
