= Brahmotsavam (soundtrack) =

Brahmotsavam (Original Motion Picture Soundtrack)

Soundtrack album by Mickey J. Meyer
- Released: 14 April 2016
- Recorded: 2016
- Genre: Feature film soundtrack
- Length: 21:59
- Language: Telugu
- Label: Zee Music Company
- Producer: Mickey J. Meyer

Mickey J. Meyer chronology
Tuneega Tuneega (2012)	Brahmotsavam (Original Motion Picture Soundtrack) (2016)	A Aa (2016)

Brahmotsavam (Original Motion Picture Soundtrack) is the soundtrack to the 2016 film of the same name directed by Srikanth Addala and stars Mahesh Babu, Kajal Aggarwal, Samantha Ruth Prabhu and Pranitha Subhash. Mickey J. Meyer composed the film's soundtrack which consisted of seven songs with lyrics written by Sirivennela Seetharama Sastry, Krishna Chaitanya and Addala himself. The soundtrack was released under the Zee Music Company label on 14 April 2016.

== Development ==
In March 2015, the makers announced that Addala's regular collaborator Mickey J. Meyer would compose the music and background score; this would be his second collaboration with Babu after the Addala-directored Seethamma Vakitlo Sirimalle Chettu (2013). Initially, Meyer rejected the offer after he interpreted it to be a devotional film as per the title, but later agreed to do after Addala explained that it was not a devotional film, but a contemporary film that focused on family values.

While the music for Seethamma Vakitlo Sirimalle Chettu was mostly traditional and native, Brahmotsavam's soundtrack consisted of mostly contemporary sounds that fuses electronic melodies with native lyrics. The track "Vacchindi Kada Avakasam" which infuses EDM elements, was recorded by Abhay Jodhpurkar in early March 2016. All the songs with the exclusion of "Put Your Hands Up" had been approved by Addala in one go. However, Meyer felt that the lyrics are deeply significant and had to balance the music and lyrics simultaneously.

Meyer refused to compose the film score citing creative differences with Addala on one particular sequence. As the makers felt unconvinced with his interpretation, the team then approached Gopi Sunder to compose the score.

== Release ==
The film's audio was initially scheduled to launch on 25 March, but later postponed to 8 April to coincide with Ugadi. The makers planned for grand arrangements for the audio release event at Tirupati. But the makers announce that the audio launch will be delayed, as Meyer had to compose the last song of the film. The audio was launched in a grand ceremony on 14 April 2016 at JRC Convention Centre in Hyderabad, with the presence of the cast and crew and other celebrities. The songs were released digitally on the day of the launch.

== Reception ==
The audio received mostly positive response from critics and audiences. Behindwoods gave the soundtrack 2.75 out of 5 stating, "Brahmotsavam is a breezy album from Mickey J Meyer which lives up to the film's theme and promises what it delivers." Indiaglitz gave 3.25 out of 5 and stated "An album with a pronounced traditional (and in one place, even folkish) sound and patois." H. Shivkumar of Bollywoodlife stated the album as "refreshing and melodic" and gave 3.5 out of 5. 123Telugu stated "The album has a perfect blend of family, romantic and youthful numbers which matches well with the visuals". Karthik Srinivasan of Milliblog stated The prominent electronic sound including, Mickey delivers a crowd-pleasing and massy commercial soundtrack". The reviewer from Sify described Meyer's songs to be "good" and "catchy". Kirubhakar Purushothaman of India Today, however described the songs "not-so-good" and criticized its placement. Suresh Kavirayani of Deccan Chronicle wrote "Micky J. Mayer's music is average and some of the songs are mistimed." Sreedhar Pillai of Firstpost claimed that the film had "too many songs coming as speed breakers".

== Legal issues ==
A suit for damages of Rs. 25 lakhs was filed against the makers for copying the first 36 seconds of the Tulu song A...lele...yereg madme by Dr. Vamana Nandaavara found in the Deepanalike CD composed for Siri channel. The song was used in the movie in a sequence involving the lead actor who while accompanying his family on a tour dances to the tune of the hit Tulu song.

== Track listing ==
Brahmotsavam (Original Motion Picture Soundtrack) track listing
No.	Title	Lyrics	Artist(s)	Length
1.	"Vacchindi Kada Avakasam"	Sirivennela Seetharama Sastry	Abhay Jodhpurkar	4:17
2.	"Madhuram Madhuram"	Traditional	Padma, Sridevi	2:15
3.	"Brahmotsavam"	Sirivennela Seetharama Sastry	Sreerama Chandra Mynampati	4:22
4.	"Aata Paatalaadu"	Srikanth Addala	Karthik	5:34
5.	"Naidorintikada"	Sirivennela Seetharama Sastry	Ramya Behara, Anjana Sowmya	2:18
6.	"Bala Tripuramani"	Krishna Chaitanya	Rahul Nambiar	4:12
7.	"Put Your Hands Up"	Krishna Chaitanya	Sravana Bhargavi	3:51
Total length:				21:59

== Accolades ==
Accolades for Brahmotsavam (Original Motion Picture Soundtrack)
Award (Note: Awards are in alphabetical order.)	Date of ceremony (Note: Date is linked to the article about the awards held that year, wherever possible.)	Category	Recipient(s)	Result	Ref.
Filmfare Awards South	17 June 2017	Best Female Playback Singer – Telugu	Ramya Behara and Anjana Sowmya for "Naidorintikada"	Nominated	
Nandi Awards	14 November 2017	Best Music Director	Mickey J. Meyer	Won (Note: Also for A Aa and Sathamanam Bhavati)	
