= Maduve Mane =

- Directed by: Sunil Kumar Singh
- Written by: Nagesh
- Produced by: H. A. Rahman
- Starring: Ganesh; Shradha Arya
- Cinematography: Shekar Chandra
- Edited by: Soundar Raju
- Music by: Manikanth Kadri
- Distributed by: K. Manju Cinemaas
- Release date: 4 November 2011
- Country: India
- Language: Kannada

Maduve Mane ( transl. Wedding House) is a 2011 Indian Kannada-language romantic action comedy film directed by Sunil Kumar Singh and produced by H. A. Rahman under the banner J. J. International. It stars Ganesh and Shradha Arya in the lead roles. The music of the film was composed by Manikanth Kadri.

== Plot ==
Suraj is a lively yet talkative guy who meets Suma in a train and gets invited to her wedding with ASP Dushyanta. Suraj tries to woo Suma during her wedding, but to no avail. During the wedding, Dushyanta receives a phone call from an anonymous person who instructs Dushyanta to order Suraj and Suma to drive a jeep, which is planted with a bomb, in exchange for saving everyone as he had rigged bombs outside the wedding hall.

Dushyanta follows the caller's instructions. After sending Surya and Suma, Dushyanta checks the bomb only to find that it is actually LEDs. Suraj and Suma get stuck in a forest and Suma develops feelings for Suraj. Suma later finds out that the anonymous caller is actually Suraj. Suraj takes Suma to his village and reveals that Dushyanta was a publicity hungry officer who killed his sister Preeti in a crossfire when he tried to kill a reporter named Nataraj.

Suraj learns from Nataraj's mother that Dushyanta adopted cruel ways to gain publicity by killing innocent people in fake encounters and framing them as terrorists or gangsters. Suraj decided to expose Dushyanta's activities in order to avenge Preethi's death. After learning this, Suma begins to hate Dushyanta. Dushyanta learns about Suraj's past, where he arrives at Suraj's village and reveals about his corrupt activities.

Dushyanta invites Suraj to his wedding with Suma in exchange for saving a girl from his village. It is revealed that Suraj had secretly recorded Dushyanta's conversation, he plays the video at the wedding and Dushyanta gets arrested. In the aftermath, Suma leaves for her hometown, where Suraj also arrives and finally reunites with Suma.

== Cast ==
- Ganesh as Suraj
- Shradha Arya as Suma
- Tabla Nani
- Sharan
- Avinash Narasimharaju as ASP Dushyanta
- Spoorti
- Shille Manjunath
- Vybhav M

== Production ==
The film was earlier rumored to be a remake of Hindi blockbuster film Dilwale Dulhania Le Jayenge. However, the team dismissed the rumors and said that the film was an adaptation of Ramayana in modern times.

== Soundtrack ==
Song title	Singers	Lyricist
"Naxalittu Naanalla"	Vijay Prakash, Surmukhi Raman	Yogaraj Bhat
"Idena"	Manikanth Kadri, Surmukhi Raman	Prathima Mudigere
"Priya Ninna"	Hemanth Kumar, Chaitra H. G.	Kaviraj
"Kanne Koodiruvaaga"	Karthik	Jayanth Kaikini
"Onde Notakke"	Tippu	Prathima Mudigere
"Chitthara"	Manikanth Kadri	Sunil Kumar Singh

== Reception ==
=== Critical response ===
Bangalore Mirror gave 3.5/5 stars and wrote "Maduve Mane's story may look like three different films in one, but overall it keeps you engaged and could well be Singh's dream debut and Ganesh's second coming. Let good cinemas shower." Vijaya Sarathy of Sify gave 3/5 stars and wrote "Manikanth Khadri`s songs are well composed. The sharp cuts by editor Soundar raise the tempo of the film. Maduve Mane is a neat, class presentation of a well written script."

B S Srivani from Deccan Herald wrote "Shekhar Chandra’s camerawork is A-One and Manikant Kadri’s music has a familiar feel to it, with a couple of songs burning the charts. Soundarrajan’s editing also helps make this film a complete entertainer, leaving very little to complain. This Maduve Mane is quite a welcoming place." Manju Shettar of News18 wrote "What you might enjoy in the film is the comic exchange between Tabla Naani and Sharan. Cinematography and editing are noteworthy. Manikanth Kadri's music does nothing to lift the movie from its banality."
