= Eno Onthara =

- Directed by: Mahesh
- Screenplay by: Mahesh
- Story by: S. J. Surya
- Based on: Kushi (Tamil)
- Produced by: M. Chandrashekar
- Starring: Ganesh; Priyamani; Sharan
- Cinematography: P. K. H. Dass
- Edited by: Deepu S. Kumar
- Music by: V. Harikrishna
- Production company: Udaya Chandra Productions
- Release date: 12 November 2010
- Running time: 158 minutes
- Country: India
- Language: Kannada

Eno Onthara (spelt Aenoo Onthara onscreen;) is a 2010 Indian Kannada-language romantic comedy film directed by "Mussanje" Mahesh and produced by M. Chandrashekar under the Udayachandra Productions banner. The film stars Ganesh in lead role. The soundtrack was composed by V. Harikrishna. This film is a remake of Tamil film Kushi. The film's title is based on a song from Hudugaata (2007).

== Plot ==
Surya (Ganesh) is a student in a college in Mysore. He develops a close relationship with his classmate Madhumathi (Priyamani) after seeing her confident nature. But their ego-centric nature makes them stay apart always. Once both struggle to unite their friends Shanthi and Prasad, who are in love. What happens to their own love story will form the climax of the film.

== Cast ==
- Ganesh as Surya
- Priyamani as Madhumathi
- Srinivasa Murthy
- Jai Jagadish
- Kadhal Dhandapani
- Sharan as Dance master
- Tejaswini
- Padma Vasanthi
- Vijayalakshmi Singh
- Sathish Ninasam as Surya's friend

== Soundtrack ==
Eno Onthara

Soundtrack album by V. Harikrishna
- Released: 2010
- Genre: Feature film soundtrack

Track #	Song	Singer(s)	Duration
1	"Gandu Makkalu"	Jessie Gift, Anuradha Bhat	04:18
2	"Dilkush"	Sonu Nigam, Shweta Mohan	04:49
3	"Boom Boom Pa"	Ranjith	04:19
4	"Inthi Ninna Preethiya"	Sonu Nigam, Shreya Ghoshal	05:12
5	"Antara Heegeke"	S. P. Balasubrahmanyam	05:10

== Reception ==
=== Critical response ===
Shruti Indira Lakshminarayana of Rediff.com scored the film at 1.5 out of 5 stars and says "The dialogues lack punch and the music is not out of the box, barring Dil Kush, which is soothing. A film that could have been an ideal family entertainer lands up being an outdated attempt. Eno Onthara has nothing fresh to offer even to Ganesh's fans. The wait for this film was definitely not worth it". A critic from The Times of India scored the film at 3 out of 5 and wrote "Ganesh steals the show with his sterling performance. Priyamani is equally impressive. Srinivasamurthy is excellent while Sharan impresses one with some good moves as a dance master. Music by V Harikrishna is okay". Arun Seshadri from Deccan Herald wrote "Madhu and Surya who study in the same college manage to become friends but viewers need to wait till the very end for them to express their love. Sharan provides some comic relief but is no way close to Vivek in his role as dancemaster of the troop. Music by R P Patnaik is passable".
