= M. D. Sridhar =

Indian film director

- Occupations: Writer, Director
- Years active: 2002 – present
- Children: Ananya Shetty, Aayush Shetty

M. D. Shridhar is a Kannada film writer and director. He debuted with the successful 2002 film Friends and since then has directed many successful films such as Chellata (2006), Porki (2010) and Bulbul (2013).

== Personal life ==
M.D. Sridhar was born in Bunt (Shetty) family of Bailoor village of Karkala Tq in Udupi district. Following his passion to work in films he migrated to Bengaluru. He married Vijayalakshmi in 1997.

== Filmography ==
Year	Film	Credited as		Language	Notes
Year	Film	Director	Screenwriter	Language	Notes
2002	Friends	✓	✓	Kannada	Remake of Telugu film 6 Teens
2006	Chellata	✓	✓	Kannada	Remake of Malayalam movie Pulival Kalyanam
2007	Krishna	✓	✓	Kannada	Partial remake of Tamil film Unnai Ninaithu
2009	Jolly Days	✓	✓	Kannada	Remake of Telugu film Happy Days
2010	Porki	✓	✓	Kannada	Remake of Telugu film Pokiri
2012	Sagar	✓	✓	Kannada	Remake of Telugu film Chukkallo Chandrudu
2013	Galaate	✓	✓	Kannada	
2013	Bulbul	✓	✓	Kannada	Remake of Telugu film Darling
2014	Buguri	✓	✗	Kannada	
2019	Odeya	✓	✓	Kannada	Remake of Tamil film Veeram
