= Krishna (2007 film) =

- Film poster
- Directed by: M. D. Sridhar
- Written by: B. A. Madhu (Dialogues)
- Screenplay by: M. D. Sridhar
- Story by: Vikraman (unc.)
- Produced by: Ramesh Yadav
- Starring: Ganesh; Pooja Gandhi; Sharmila Mandre
- Cinematography: Shekhar Chandra
- Edited by: P. R. Sounder Raj
- Music by: V. Harikrishna
- Production companies: Royal Pictures; Ramesh Yadav Movies
- Distributed by: Jayanna Films
- Release date: 5 October 2007
- Running time: 160 minutes
- Country: India
- Language: Kannada

Krishna is a 2007 Indian Kannada-language film directed by M. D. Sridhar and starring Ganesh, Pooja Gandhi and Sharmila Mandre. It was produced by Ramesh Yadav. Some parts of the film was inspired from Unnai Ninaithu (2002). The film was remade in Odia in 2015 as Bhala Pae Tate 100 Ru 100 starring Babushan.

== Synopsis ==
The story is about Krishna (Ganesh), an anchor for a popular television show. Krishna is a paying guest at the house of Krishnakumar whose daughter Pooja (Pooja Gandhi) is secretly in love with him, though she pretends to dislike him.

When Pooja confesses her love to Krishna, he tells her of his previous life, when he was a nobody and was deeply in love with Anjali (Sharmila Mandre) whose entire family was poverty stricken and Krishna helped them out wherever and whenever he could. Anjali loves Krishna as well and everyone including Krishna assumes that he will end up with Anjali. However, when one of Anjali's wealthy relatives arrives, pays attentions to her, and asks her to marry him so that he can help her study medicine which is her dream, Anjali agrees to her family's wish that she marry this rich relative and break off with Krishna. A heartbroken Krishna comes to Bangalore unable to bear the sorrow.

Pooja is confident that she will win Krishna's love. However, Anjali comes back into Krishna's life – when her fiancé has ditched her. She is now penniless and Krishna helps her out by getting her a medical seat. Anjali falls in love with Krishna and in the end when she is about to commence her career as a doctor, she informs him of her love. Krishna tells her that he helped her out not out of love but out of pity. He gives her a sermon on love and tells her that his love for her is a thing of the past. Anjali leaves sadder but wiser.

Krishna gets together with Pooja, and the pair walk away happily leaving the audience to assume they live happily ever after.

== Cast ==
- Ganesh as "Video Jackie" Krishna
- Pooja Gandhi as Pooja
- Sharmila Mandre as Anjali
- Avinash as Anjali's father
- Vinaya Prasad as Anjali's mother
- Bharath Bhagavathar as Pooja's father
- Sudha Belawadi as Pooja's mother
- Rashmi in a special appearance
- Sharan as Rama, Krishna's friend
- Ramaswamy as television channel owner
- Krishnendra Pandith
- R. G. Vijayasarathy as garment shop owner
- Ramesh Yadav in a special appearance
- Suresh Anchan
- Roopika (credited as Baby Roopika)
- M. D. Sridhar in a special appearance

== Production ==
This film marks the second collaboration between Ganesh and M. D. Sridhar after Chellata (2006). Some of Ganesh's real life experiences were incorporated into the film and Ganesh was present during screenplay discussions with the director. Most of the songs were shot at a huge set erected at Abbaiah Naidu Studios, Bengaluru. A song devoted to Krishna was shot at Ranganathaswamy Temple, Srirangam.

== Soundtrack ==
Krishna

Soundtrack album by V. Harikrishna
- Released: 13 September 2007
- Genre: Feature film soundtrack
- Length: 24:39
- Label: Jhankar Music

V. Harikrishna composed the background score and music for the film's soundtrack. The lyrics were penned by K. Kalyan, Kaviraj and Jayant Kaikini. The album consists of five tracks.

Track listing
No.	Title	Lyrics	Singer(s)	Length
1.	"Gollara Golla"	K. Kalyan	Udit Narayan, Suma Shastry	4:43
2.	"Neenu Banda Mele"	Kaviraj	Sonu Nigam, Nanditha	4:55
3.	"Hey Hudugi"	Kaviraj	Hariharan	5:17
4.	"Thaiyya Thaiyya"	Kaviraj	V. Harikrishna, Janani, Suchitra, Gurukiran	4:25
5.	"Hey Mouna"	Jayant Kaikini	Shankar Mahadevan	5:19
Total length:				24:39

== Critical response ==
R. G. Vijayasarathy of Rediff.com wrote that "Krishna will be a treat for Ganesh fans". A critic from Deccan Herald wrote that the film had "The right mix of emotion, humour and action".

== Box office ==
As of November 2007, the film was running in theatres for four weeks in Bengaluru, Kolar, and Tumkur and made ₹1.5 crore.

== Awards and nominations ==
Year (Note: Refers to the year in which the ceremony was held.)	Category	Award	Nominee	Result	Note
2008	Best Actress	Suvarna Film Awards	Pooja Gandhi	Won	
