= Mr. 420 (2012 film) =

2012 Indian Kannada-language romantic comedy film

- Film poster
- Directed by: Pradeep Raj
- Written by: B. A. Madhu
- Produced by: Sandesh Nagraj
- Starring: Ganesh; Pranitha; Rangayana Raghu
- Cinematography: R. Giri
- Edited by: Kumar
- Music by: V. Harikrishna
- Release date: 19 October 2012
- Country: India
- Language: Kannada

Mr. 420 is a 2012 Indian Kannada-language romantic comedy film starring Ganesh and Pranitha Subhash. This film was directed by Prakash Raj and produced by Sandesh Nagaraj under Sandesh films banner. V. Harikrishna is the music composer and R. Giri is the cinematographer. The film made its theatrical release on 19 October 2012.

== Plot ==
Krishna lives in his village with his grandmother who dies. He leaves for Bangalore with his uncle Ranganna to eke out a living. Ranganna’s family engages in Pickpocketing and theft. Krishna and leaves for his village but circumstances force him to accept the situation. Krishna falls in love with Rukmini, who leaves his activities when Rukku learns of this. Krishna and Ranganna seek jobs at an electronic showroom, but to no avail.

They work as baggers in the bus station and find a suitcase, thinking it is a bag of money. They are caught by the by police Inspector Kashinath who opens the suitcase to reveal a severed head in it. They find that the severed head is an underworld gangster Karadi Seena. Circumstances force Krishna and Ranganna to tell that they killed Seena to Seena's rival gang and they treat them with respect and lead a luxurious life.

The twist in the tail arises when the duo learn that Seena is Rukmini's brother and decide to prove their innocence. Rukmini mistakes Krishna to be Seena's killer and leaves him, Krishna follows Rukmini to prove his innocence. Meanwhile, The gang finds out that their gang member Paagal actually killed Seena and chases Ranganna, who escapes and proves Krishna's innocence. They are chased by the gang along with Kashinath and officers.

A climax ensues where Kashinath accidentally shoots at sting bees and the bees attack them. Krishna-Ranganna and Rukmini jump from a terrace to a swimming pool and are saved. Thus, Krishna and Ranganna are proved innocent and leave for their village and become farmers and start farming at their grandmother's land.

== Cast ==
- Ganesh as Krishna
- Pranitha Subhash as Rukmini
- Rangayana Raghu as Ranganath
- Sadhu Kokila as SI Kashinath
- Kuri Prathap as Constable Siddesha
- Chikkanna as Constable Madesha
- Mimicry Gopi as "Smile" Paramananda
- Pradeep Raj

== Soundtrack ==
Mr.420

Soundtrack album by V. Harikrishna
- Released: September 2012
- Genre: Feature film soundtrack

V. Harikrishna composed 5 songs to the lyrics of Jayanth Kaikini.

No.	Title	Singer(s)	Length
1.	"Ella Lolalotte"	Vijay Prakash
2.	"Tamate Soundu"	Kailash Kher, Malathy Lakshman
3.	"Shampoo Haakalva"	Tippu, Sowmya Raoh
4.	"Nee Eshtu Muddu"	Anuradha Bhat, Karthik
5.	"Thale Kedisa Beda"	Ranjith, Naveen Madhav

== Reception ==
A critic from The Times of India scored the film at 2.5 out of 5 stars and says "While Ganesh has done justice to the role, Rangayana Raghu impresses only in some sequences. Pranitha is okay. Music by V Harikrishna fails to register". A critic from News18 India wrote "V Harikrishna is also monotonous in his tunes. Nothing is catchy from his five songs. R Giri cinematography is OK but nothing appealing in shots. Editing also deserved to be better. The main trump card that was supposed to be dialogues for Ganesh is also substandard". Shruti I L from Deccan Herald wrote "As for Ganesh, his fans may also be left asking for more. It would do the actor good to be more choosy about his roles and not stereotype himself. Our final verdict: Don’t let this Mr 420 burn a hole in your pocket, watch out!". A Sharadhaa The New Indian Express wrote " V Harikrishna's music with Kaviraj, Nagendra Prasad and Yograj Bhat's lyrics does not give out the best tracks for the film and there is nothing really to boast about R Giri's cinematography either. Verdict: 'Mr 420' did not give a festive buzz". Srikanth Srinivasa from Rediff.com scored the film at 2.5 out of 5 stars and says "Sadhu Kokila as an inspector gets the most laughs. Rangayana Raghu acts well in the first half but tends to overact in the second half. Ganesh has performed well but is overshadowed by the others. Pranitha is good. Director Pradeep Raj appears as a villain in the movie. The music is just average, as is the camerawork". B S Srivani from Deccan Herald wrote "And what goes on as comedy is too loud and garbled to be made much sense of. Stories like this one are predictable at best. But Mr 420 teaches a devoted movie buff not to have any expectation at all. Pity the waste of money here". A critic from Bangalore Mirror wrote "At one point of the film when an item song is imminent Raghu says, “I need a Bombay girl. Those girls are white.” This is the kind of instincts that the film caters to. This is the stuff that B-grade comedies with B-grade heroes are made of. Not at all worthy of Ganesh".
