= Shravani Subramanya =

2013 Indian Kannada-language romantic comedy film

- First look of the film
- Directed by: Manju Swaraj
- Written by: Manju Swaraj
- Screenplay by: Manju Swaraj
- Story by: Manju Swaraj
- Produced by: K. A. Suresh
- Starring: Ganesh; Amulya
- Narrated by: Sudeep
- Cinematography: B. Suresh Babu
- Edited by: Basavaraj urs
- Music by: V. Harikrishna
- Production company: Suresh Arts
- Distributed by: Jayanna Combines
- Release date: 27 December 2013
- Running time: 2 hours 42 minutes
- Country: India
- Language: Kannada

Shravani Subramanya is a 2013 Indian Kannada-language romantic comedy film written and directed by Manju Swaraj and produced by K. A Suresh under his home production banner Suresh Arts Productions. The film features Ganesh and Amulya in lead roles. This is the second collaboration of both stars after the 2007 blockbuster hit Cheluvina Chittara. Amulya makes her comeback after a hiatus through this film.

The film features the score and soundtrack composed by V. Harikrishna. The principal photography of the film began at Mysore around the Lalit Mahal palace and has been progressing at a brisk pace in the same city. The first teaser of the film was released on YouTube website by the producer on 29 June 2013. Amulya won Best Actress Award at 61st Filmfare Awards South for her Performance.

== Plot ==
Shravani is a final-year college student in Mandya. She is the daughter of Kempegowda, the head of the village. She is a prankster and is loved by her family. Subramanya is a aspiring musician in Mysore who aspires to be a music director and tries to impress the music directors with his skills, but to no avail. Shravani is smitten by Sudeep who proposes to her. Though initially taken aback by the proposal, they decide to elope. However, she learns that Sudeep is actually a womaniser/gangster and she tries to escape from him. Sudeep captures her, but she is saved by Subramanya, who thrashes Sudeep. Shravani jumps into a river to commit suicide but Subramanya saves her.

Shravani tells him that her parents will kill her if they learn that she was eloping with a gangster. Subramanya tells Shravani that he will pretend to be her lover for the time being and will divulge everything to Kempegowda eventually, and also ask Shravani to wear a fake mangalsutra. Believing the story, an enraged Kempegowda throws them out. Subramanya drops Shravani at her aunt's house in Mysore, but she is not accepted. With Govinda's help, they decide to masquarde as a couple to Seetharam and Anuradha, who agree to lease them the house for free. Time passes by, Shravani and Subramanya grow close to each other. While thrashing Sudeep (who wants to exact revenge on Shravani) Subramanya meets Kempegowda and his brothers and reveals the truth.

Kempegowda and brothers realize their mistake and they take Shravani back to their house, leaving Shravani and Subramanya devastated. Subramanya is unable to cope up with the loss of Shravani, and Seetharam reveals that they knew Shravani and Subramanya are not a married couple, but offered them a place to stay as they looked after them like their parents. Seetharam, Anuradha and Subramanya convince Kempegowda and the family about Shravani marrying Subramanya. After seeing Subramanya's unconditional love for Shravani. Kempegowda allows the couple to reunite and agrees for their marriage, much to the happiness of the household. Thus Shravani and Subramanya reunite in the end.

== Cast ==
- Ganesh as Subramanya
- Amulya as Shravani
- Anant Nag as Seetharam
- Tara as Anuradha
- Avinash as Kempegowda
- Yashas Surya as Sudeep
- Vinaya Prasad
- Sadhu Kokila as Govinda
- Neenasam Ashwath as Kumara
- Amith Vishwanath as Mango Seller
- Mamatha Ravuth as Komala, Govinda's Lover
- Suryakala Neenaasam
- Shanthamma as Shravani's Grandmother
- Renuka Prasad
- V. Manohar in a special appearance
- Parul Yadav
- Arjun Janya as himself in a cameo appearance

== Production ==
=== Launch ===
Director Manju Swaraj, who earlier directed a critically acclaimed film, Shishira announced the name of Shravani Subramanya in early 2012. He also refuted the rumors of a possible remake of Telugu film with the same name, Itlu Sravani Subramanyam. He roped in Ganesh and Amulya, thus re-uniting the pair after Cheluvina Chittara and also got the senior actors Ananth Nag and Tara do the other pivotal roles.

=== Filming ===
The film was shot in and around the Mysore city. The crew has shot in Lalith Mahal Road and St Philomena Church, among others.

== Release ==
The film was released worldwide. In Karnataka it released around 95+ screens, and next week it added around 43 screens. It also released in USA Germany and UK.

== Soundtrack ==
Shravani Subramanya
- Soundtrack cover

Soundtrack album by V. Harikrishna
- Released: 13 December 2013
- Genre: Feature film soundtrack
- Length: 16:52
- Label: D Beats

V. Harikrishna composed the music for the film and the soundtracks. The soundtrack album marks the re-entry of veteran playback singer Manjula Gururaj after ten years. The album consists of four soundtracks.

No.	Title	Lyrics	Singer(s)	Length
1.	"Aakalbenne"	Prof. Krishne Gowda	Manjula Gururaj	3:45
2.	"Kannalle Kannittu"	V. Nagendra Prasad	Shaan	4:22
3.	"Naguva Mogava"	Kaviraj	Sonu Nigam, Nanditha	4:15
4.	"Ninna Nodo"	Kaviraj	Sonu Nigam	4:30
Total length:				16:52

== Critical response ==
Shravani Subramanya received positive reviews from critics upon its release. B. S. Srivani of Deccan Herald gave the film a rating of four out of five and praised the roles of all the departments in the film and wrote, "Shravani seems to be tailor made for Amulya. She is the perfect foil for Ganesh, who is in fine form here." G. Arun Kumar of The Times of India too gave the film a rating of four stars out of five and wrote, "Ganesh makes a lasting impression on the viewer with his effortless performance, it is Amulya who steals the show with her bubbly act." Shyam Prasad S. of Bangalore Mirror gave the film a rating of 3.5/5 and praised the roles of directing, acting and the music departments in the film.

== Box office ==
Shravani Subramanya opened to decent occupation all over Karnataka. It collected around ₹12 crore (US$1.2 million) in its first week after theatrical release and ₹31 crore (US$3.2 million) after 100 days. The film was one of the major blockbusters of 2013.

== Home media ==
Shravani Subramanya was released in DVD with Dolby Digital DTS 5.1 audio and with English subtitles. The movie was also released in 3 in 1 DVD and VCD.
