= Sangama (film) =

- Poster
- Directed by: Ravi Varma (gubbi)
- Written by: Ravi Varma
- Produced by: Sanjay V Babu
- Starring: Ganesh; Vedhika; Rangayana Raghu
- Cinematography: Shekar Chandru
- Music by: Devi Sri Prasad
- Release date: 24 October 2008
- Country: India
- Language: Kannada

Sangama ( transl. Confluence) is a 2008 Kannada language romantic drama film directed by Ravi Varma and starring Ganesh and Vedhika. This film marks the directorial debut of musical arranger Ravi Varma. It was released on 24 October 2008.

== Plot ==
Gajaraj dreams of getting his daughter Lakshmi (Vedhika) married to a good guy and is looking out for a good bridegroom. Balu (Ganesh), who is Gajaraj's neighbour, has worked hard getting information about the family backgrounds of the proposals he has gotten till now for Gajaraj's daughter. One day Balu gets a marriage proposal from someone who is an NRI guy from Germany. Lakshmi's family members are happy with the proposal and have agreed to it. Lakshmi's marriage arrangements are being made. Lakshmi expresses her love for Balu but he refuses her. When it becomes very difficult for Lakshmi to forget Balu and marry the German bridegroom her family members come to know about her feelings towards Balu. Later her family members accept her affection for Balu and decide that she can marry Balu.

== Cast ==
- Ganesh as Balu
- Vedhika as Lakshmi
- Rangayana Raghu as Gajaraj
- Sadhu Kokila
- Komal Kumar
- Tulasi Shivamani
- Jayamma
- Myna Chandru
- Mohan Juneja
- Yeshas as Germany bridegroom
- Meghana
- Shille Manjunath

== Music ==
The official soundtrack contains six songs composed by Devi Sri Prasad with lyrics penned by Kaviraj. The audio of the film released on 28 September 2008.

Sangama

Studio album by Devi Sri Prasad
- Released: 28 September 2008 (CD release)
- Genre: Feature film soundtrack
- Length: 26:50
- Label: Jhankar Music
- Producer: S. V. Babu

Devi Sri Prasad chronology
Ready (2008)	Sangama (2008)	King (2008)

Song	Singer(s)	Duration
"Dil Maange More"	Devi Sri Prasad	04:52
"Sangama"	Sagar, Divya H.	04:48
"Madhu Maasa"	Karthik	04:20
"Hey Mister Baalu"	Chinmanyi, Rita	03:29
"Kodu Kodu Varavanu"	Gopika Poornima	04:10
"Muddhu Muddhu"	Ranjith, Sri Vidya	05:11

== Reception ==
=== Critical response ===
A critic from Bangalore Mirror wrote that "It is astonishing how a producer with experience and an actor with such mass following could agree to this project. There is nothing closely resembling a story or screenplay. The director has managed to make a film that would neither benefit the producer or enthuse Ganesh’s fans. Except for some decent music by Devi Sriprasad, the film falls flat in all other aspects". R. G. Vijayasarathy of IANS wrote that "Golden Star' Ganesh's new film 'Sangama' does not boast of a fresh story. The movie's theme doesn't have any innovative elements, but it has appealing music and a great performance by Ganesh". A critic from Rediff.com wrote that "Nothing exceptional can be said about Sekhar Chandru's photography, though Devi's music still make the film worth a watch. All in all, Sangama ends up as an ordinary fare because of a weak story and ill conceived narration". A critic from Sify wrote that "A tolerable and passable film from Golden star Ganesh for this Diwali festival is strictly for family viewing".

== Box office ==
The movie had a good box office run initially in spite of negative reviews from critics.
