= Maleyali Jotheyali =

- Theaterical poster
- Directed by: Preetham Gubbi
- Written by: Preetham Gubbi; Mahesh Devashetty (dialogues)
- Produced by: Shilpa Ganesh
- Starring: Ganesh; Yuvika Chaudhary; Anjana Sukhani
- Cinematography: Krishna
- Edited by: Deepu S Kumar
- Music by: V. Harikrishna
- Distributed by: Golden Movies
- Release date: 11 December 2009
- Country: India
- Language: Kannada

Maleyali Jotheyali ( transl. In the rain, together) is a 2009 Indian Kannada-language romantic drama written and directed by Preetham Gubbi. The film stars Ganesh, Anjana Sukhani and Yuvika Chaudhary. Shilpa Ganesh, produced the film under their production house, Golden Movies.

== Plot ==
Preetham is the only son of a wealthy but superstitious real estate dealer. His close friend is Venkatesh. After Preetham passes his P.U.C., his father's astrologers inform his father that for the continued peace of his household, Preetham must find a wife. To avoid the problem, Preetham and Venkatesh bribe an astrologer to tell Preetham's father of a very eligible girl in Sakaleshpura (who is fictional and invented by Preetham and Venkatesh).

Thus Preetham is able to escape to Sakleshpura, where he stays with an army colonel named Thammiah. It is here that he bumps into Anjali, who lives in the district nearby, and also into Sandhya, who is an independent girl and a man hater. Preetham also begins to receive many calls from Lucky, a little girl who dialed his number by mistake and became his "mobile friend". Preetham falls for Sandhya.

Slowly Preetham becomes friends with Anjali, and in order to score brownie points with Sandhya, invents a story of Anjali being dumped by her childhood lover and being in a state of depression. Sandhya becomes friends with Preetham to help Anjali out of her so-called misery, and gradually the three become friends.

Preetham begins to discover a number of qualities about Anjali and slowly finds out that how good she is. Gradually, Pretham falls in love with Anjali while Sandhya begins to like Preetham.

When Anjali finds out about Preetham's love, she leaves Sakleshpura (she overhears him talking to an old man whom Anjali helps out financially, who is actually Anjali's father). Preetham leaves brokenhearted.

Arriving in Bangalore, Preetham first discovers that Lucky has died of a heart attack and that he will never be able to see her again. Then he finds out from Anjali's doctor that Anjali is a cancer patient who is dying.

Despite all this, he meets Anjali and convinces her that three minutes with a loved one is better than a hundred years with an unloved one, and Preetham and Anjali get together.

== Cast ==
- Ganesh as Preetham
- Anjana Sukhani as Sandhya
- Yuvika Chaudhary as Anjali
- H. G. Dattatreya as Col. Thammayya
- Rangayana Raghu as Rangappa
- Sharan as Venkatesh
- Sihi Kahi Chandru as Sandhya's father
- Sihi Kahi Geetha as Sandhya's mother
- Baby Prathiksha as "Lucky"
- R. G. Vijayasarathy as astrologer
- Mohan Juneja as astrologer
- Suresh Mangalore
- Nagesh Yadav as Dr. Anand
- Sudharani as Lucky's mother (cameo)
- Amulya as Aishu (cameo)

== Production ==
Director Preetham Gubbi shot the movie in Sakleshpur and Mysore; some of the songs were shot in Bangalore.

Produced under the banner of Golden Movies, the movie has Preetham Gubbi's story and screenplay, Krishna’s camera work, V. Harikrishna's music, Deepu S. Kumar's editing and Mohan's art direction. Devashetty Mahesh penned the dialogues, while Kaviraj and Jayant Kaikini penned the lyrics.

Ganesh, Anjana Sukhani, Yuvika Chaudhury, Sihi Kahi Chandru, Sihi Kahi Geetha, Rangayan Raghu, Sharan, Dattanna and many others are in the cast.

== Soundtrack ==
The film's soundtrack was composed by V. Harikrishna and released on 14 November 2009.

Maleyali Jotheyali

Soundtrack album by V. Harikrishna
- Released: 14 October 2009
- Genre: Film soundtrack
- Length: 32:59
- Label: Anand Audio

No.	Title	Lyrics	Singer(s)	Length
1.	"Halaadh Halaadh Heartalli"	Kaviraj	Ganesh	04:28
2.	"Nee Sanihake Bandare"	Jayanth Kaikini	Sonu Nigam	04:25
3.	"Shruvaagidhe"	Kaviraj	Shaan, Shreya Ghoshal	04:23
4.	"Maleyali Jotheyali (Female)"	Jayanth Kaikini	Vani Harikrishna	05:14
5.	"Yenu Helabeku"	Jayanth Kaikini	Sonu Nigam, Shreya Ghoshal	05:02
6.	"Maleyali Jotheyali (Male)"	Jayanth Kaikini	Sonu Nigam	05:13
7.	"Yaare Ninna Mummy Daddy"	Kaviraj	Tippu, Priya Himesh	04:14

== Reception ==
=== Critical response ===
R G Vijayasarathy of Rediff.com scored the film at 3.5 out of 5 stars and says "Hari Krishna makes a strong comeback with his music composition. Both versions of Nee Sanihake Baralu, the title song are top class. S.Krishna is undoubtedly a perfectionist and each frame shows a glimpse of his talent. Mahesh and Vinayakram have done a good job in their debut as dialogue writers. Maleyali Jotheyali is an enjoyable film and a real feast for Ganesh fans". A critic from The Times of Indiascored the film at 4 out of 5 stars and says "Ganesh is simply superb, especially in emotional sequences. He brings alive the film through his dialogue delivery and mannerisms. Anjana Sukhani and Yuvika Chaudhury are okay. Mahesh Deva Shetty impresses with his catchy dialogues. Sharan and Rangayana Raghu excel". A critic from Deccan Herald wrote "Ganesh has done justice to his role as an entertainer. Performance of Anjana Sukhani and Yuvika Choudhari, the first-timers, is average. Krishna’s camera work deserves appreciation. Harikrishna’s music for two songs is a treat for the audience. Rangayana Raghu and Sharan have again proved that they are good entertainers". A critic from Bangalore Mirror wrote "The pick of the soundtrack is Ganesh’s Haalada heartalli – his earthy vocals and a joyous, Goan-styled tune do the trick!Competent winner from Harikrishna".

=== Box office ===
The film successfully completed 100 days.

== Home media ==
The movie was released on DVD with 5.1 channel surround sound and English subtitles and VCD.

== Awards ==
The movie won two awards at the 57th South Filmfare Awards:

- Best Film: Maleyali Jotheyali
- Best Actor: Ganesh
