= Chellata (film) =

- DVD cover
- Directed by: M. D. Sridhar
- Written by: B A Madhu (dialogue)
- Screenplay by: M. D. Sridhar
- Story by: M. D. Sridhar
- Based on: Pulival Kalyanam (Malayalam)(2003) by Shafi
- Produced by: Jagadish Kotyan
- Starring: Ganesh; Rekha Vedavyas
- Cinematography: Sundarnath Suvarna
- Edited by: P. R. Soundar Raj
- Music by: Gurukiran
- Production company: Bhoomi Productions
- Release date: 21 April 2006
- Running time: 157 minutes
- Country: India
- Language: Kannada

Chellata is a 2006 Indian Kannada-language romantic comedy film directed by M. D. Sridhar and produced by Jagadish Kotyan under the Bhoomi Productions banner. It is a remake of the 2003 Malayalam film Pulival Kalyanam. The film stars Ganesh and Rekha Vedavyas. The soundtrack was composed by Gurukiran. The film had a low budget and was a success at the box office.

== Plot ==
Ganesh (Ganesh) is the adopted younger brother of Rudra (Devaraj). When Rudra loses his right hand in an accident, Ganesh at a young age takes responsibility of his family. Rudra's sister is in love with the son of Rangayana Raghu, who is unscrupulous and demands a huge dowry for the marriage to be made possible. To make this marriage possible Rudra and Ganesh take a loan from a financier (Mohan Juneja) and invest it in an explosives business, only to lose it completely.

Simultaneously, Ganesh gets his phone muddled with Rekha's (Rekha Vedavyas) on account of both the phone models being the same. Rekha's father Avinash is the boss of Rangayana Raghu. Ganesh and Rekha have loads of comical misunderstandings before falling in love and deciding to get married. Of course this is not acceptable to Avinash, and he puts obstacles in their way. The story is about whether or not Ganesh and Rekha can overcome these obstacles.

== Cast ==
- Ganesh as Ganesh
- Rekha Vedavyas as Ankitha
- Devaraj as Rudra, Ganesh's brother
- Rangayana Raghu as Jagadish
- Tennis Krishna as Dharmendra
- Umashri as Ganesh's grandmother
- Avinash as Chandrasekhar
- Komal
- Saritha Jain as Ganesh's sister
- Kishori Ballal
- Mohan Juneja as Madhu Maga
- Bank Janardhan as Ramprasad
- Mimicry Dayanand
- R. G. Vijayasarathy as wedding guest

== Soundtrack ==
Chellata

Soundtrack album by Gurukiran
- Released: 10 March 2006
- Genre: Feature film soundtrack
- Label: Anand Audio
- Producer: Gurukiran

The music was composed by Gurukiran. Purandara Dasa's "Indu Yenage Govinda" was remixed and used in the film.

| No. | Title | Lyrics | Singer(s) | Length |
|---|---|---|---|---|
| 1. | "Alele Tuntu Kanna" | Goturi | Dr. Shamitha Malnad, Murali Mohan | 4:42 |
| 2. | "Ishtaano Ishtaano" | Kaviraj | Udit Narayan, Nanditha | 4:18 |
| 3. | "Pataaki Pataaki" | Dr. V. Nagendra Prasad | Udit Narayan | 4:44 |
| 4. | "Indu Yenage Govinda" | Kaviraj | Gurukiran, Chetan Sosca | 4:40 |
| 5. | "Jama Jama Jamaisu" | V. Manohar | Haneef, Chorus | 4:42 |
| 6. | "Alele Tunta Maado" | Goturi | Dr. Shamitha Malnad, Gurukiran | 4:42 |

== Reception ==
R. G. Vijayasarathy of IANS wrote that "Chellata is just an O.K. film and its acceptance may well depend on your likes and dislikes with regard to a full-length comedy film". A critic from Indiaglitz wrote that "Drawing inspiration from a Malayalam film 'Puli Kalyanam' director Sridhar has given a new shape to the film that is convincing because of good star cast and cinematography". S. N. Deepak of Deccan Herald noted the film "for its comedy scenes that run throughout the film". He called it "a clean family entertainer" and commended the acting performances on the film.

== Box office ==
The film opened to positive reviews from critics and performed well at the box-office by completing 100 days.
