= Cheluvina Chittara =

- Movie poster
- Directed by: S. Narayan
- Screenplay by: S. Narayan
- Story by: Balaji Sakthivel
- Based on: Kaadhal
- Produced by: S. Narayan
- Starring: Ganesh; Amoolya
- Cinematography: G. Renu
- Edited by: P.R. Sounderraj
- Music by: Mano Murthy
- Release date: 22 June 2007
- Running time: 150 minutes
- Country: India
- Language: Kannada
- Box office: ₹30 crore

Cheluvina Chittara (spelt onscreen as Cheluvina Chiththara; transl. Galant Design) is a 2007 Kannada-language film directed and produced by S. Narayan. Ganesh, Amoolya played the lead roles. The music was composed by Mano Murthy. This film is a remake of Tamil film Kaadhal.

== Plot ==
Maadesha works as a mechanic in a garage. He is liked by an innocent college-going girl Aishwarya who is the daughter of a local don Potharaju. Aishwarya is deeply in love with him and they elope. Later the gang members of Potharaju are in search of the couple. The lovers are lured by the bride's uncle, and they are taken back to Potharaju. An enraged Potharaju beats up Maadesha and takes out the Mangalsutra of Aishwarya to forcibly get her married to a person she was engaged to earlier.

After a few years, Aishwarya while travelling with her husband and her child, comes across Maadesha; she finds him as a mentally deranged beggar roaming near a traffic signal. Aishwarya faints realizing that the beggar is Maadesha and gets admitted to the nearby hospital. At night she runs from the hospital to the same signal in search of Maadesha and she finds him sitting over there. Aishwarya cries to Maadesha and feels bad that she was responsible for his pathetic situation. Aishwarya's husband also comes to the spot and understands his wife's situation. He admits Maadesha in a mental health centre and also takes care of him.

== Cast ==
- Ganesh as Maadesha
- Amoolya as Aishwarya (Aishu)
- Komal Kumar
- R. G. Vijayasarathy
- Kaadhal Krishnamurthy
- Suresh Chandra
- Manikantha Surya
- Appu Venkatesh
- Sardhar Sathya
- Pipeline Ramesh
- Asharani
- Gowramma
- Jayashree Raj

== Soundtrack ==
Cheluvina Chittara

Soundtrack album by Mano Murthy
- Released: 1 April 2007
- Genre: Feature film soundtrack
- Length: 20:03
- Label: Anand Audio
- Producer: Mano Murthy

Mano Murthy composed the music for the film and soundtracks. The album has six soundtracks.

The song "Janumada Gelathi" is reused from the original soundtrack "Unakena Irupen" composed by Joshua Sridhar.

Track list
| No. | Title | Lyrics | Singer(s) | Length |
|---|---|---|---|---|
| 1. | "Kanaso Idu" | S.Narayan | Sonu Nigam, Sunidhi Chauhan | 5:34 |
| 2. | "Ullasada Hoomale" | S.Narayan | Shreya Ghoshal | 4:03 |
| 3. | "Iralare Cheluve" | S.Narayan | Kunal Ganjawala, Shreya Ghoshal | 5:09 |
| 4. | "Kendowle Kane Chendadlu Kane" | S.Narayan | Priyadarshini | 4:34 |
| 5. | "Bytu Coffee" | S.Narayan | Priyadarshini, Chetan Sosca, Nanditha, Stephen | 4:22 |
| 6. | "Janumada Gelathi" | S.Narayan | Chetan Sosca | 4:23 |
| Total length: | | | | 28:05 |

== Reception ==
A critic from Sify wrote that "Brilliant director S. Narayan seems to have lost his magic touch, as his latest film Cheluvina Chittara, a remake of that brilliant Tamil film Kadhal is unimpressive and lacks nativity". A critic from Rediff.com wrote that "Cheluvina Chiththaara will certainly work for the family audience as it is clean and natural, but its success will depend on how the audience accepts the last few reels of the film".

== Box-office ==
It completed 175 days and grossed an approximately ₹30 crore.
