= List of Kannada songs recorded by Rajesh Krishnan =

== Kannada songs ==
=== 1991–1999 ===
Year	Film	Song(s)	Music composer	Lyricist	Co-singer(s)	Notes
1991	Gauri Ganesha	"Mathinalle Gellaballe"	Rajan-Nagendra	Chi. Udayashankar		Debut song
1992	Hosa Kalla Hale Kulla	"Rani Illa Gurani Illa", "Mutthinantha Hudugi"	Hamsalekha	Hamsalekha	Chandrika Gururaj; Manjula Gururaj	
1993	Bevu Bella	"Kaala Kettoythalla", "Januma Needuthaale", "Namma Oora Cheluve", "Devarigondu Kagada Baredu", "Bhoomi Thabbida Moda"	Hamsalekha	Hamsalekha	SPB, Latha Hamsalekha	
1993	Golibar	"Dikkarisu Thiraskarisu", "Indiyana Hindo Hinda"	Hamsalekha	Hamsalekha	Manjula Gururaj	
1993	Hoovu Hannu	"Manju Manju"	Hamsalekha	Hamsalekha	K. S. Chithra	
1993	Hosa Love Story	"O Malenaadina"	Vijay Anand	Raj Kishore	Chandrika Gururaj, Gangothri	
1993	Hrudaya Bandhana	"Kaveri Melaane"	Hamsalekha	Hamsalekha	S. Janaki	
1993	Jailer Jagannath	"Adige Manege"	Hamsalekha	Hamsalekha	Manjula Gururaj	
1993	Kadambari	"Prathama Chumbana", "Pattanakke Bandanu"	Hamsalekha	Hamsalekha	Chandrika Gururaj	
1993	Kalyana Rekhe	"Markettinalli"	Hamsalekha	Hamsalekha	Manjula Gururaj	
1993	Manikantana Mahime	"Bhoomi Thanna"	M. S. Vishwanathan	Vijaya Narasimha		
1994	Appa Nanjappa Maga Gunjappa	"Arashina Kumkuma"	R. Damodar	Sriranga	Manjula Gururaj	
1994	Beda Krishna Ranginata	"Holi Hunnime", "Myna O Myna"	V. Manohar	V. Manohar	Manjula Gururaj	
1994	Gold Medal	"Kannella Nannanu"	Vijay Anand	Doddarange Gowda	Sheela	
1994	Gopi Kalyana	"Chandamama"	Hamsalekha	Hamsalekha	Latha Hamsalekha	
1994	Indrana Gedda Narendra	"Shubhadina Naga Panchami", "Mysooru Brundavana"	V. Manohar	V. Manohar	Manjula Gururaj	
1994	Kaveri Theeradalli	"Agumbeya", "Oho Chaitrada Kogileye"	Vijay Anand	S. Narayan		
1994	Love 94	"Arali Maradadi", "Kannolage Neene", "Brahmi Muhurthada", "Guleba Kavali"	V. Manohar	V. Manohar	B. R. Chaya, Sangeetha Katti	
1994	Panjarada Gili	"Namisuve Namisuve"	V. Manohar	Coffee Raghavendra		
1994	Praja Shakthi	"Upparpete Hennanthe", "Belli Modada Mele", "Prajashakthi"	Shankar	R. N. Jayagopal	Manjula Gururaj, K. S. Chithra	
1994	Super Nova 459	"Patharagitthi Pakka"	Vijaya Bhaskar	Da Ra Bendre		
1994	Anuraga Geethe	"Juttu Kathe Juttu"	Upendra Kumar	G. V. Iyer	SPB, Sundar Raj	
1995	Aagatha	"Eko Kaane"	Vijaya Bhaskar	R. N. Jayagopal		
1995	Aata Hudugata	"O Premave Nee", "Rukku Rukku Rukkumani"	Sadhu Kokila	Sri Ranga	K. S. Chithra	
1995	Anuraga Sangama	"Oho Oho Monalisa"	V. Manohar	V. Manohar		
1995	Bal Nan Maga	"Vila Vila", "Baaro Nee Hero"	Sadhu Kokila	Sri Ranga	Manjula Gururaj, K. S. Chithra	
1995	Betegara	"Neeli Kodeya"	Sadhu Kokila	Ramesh Rao	Usha Ganesh	
1995	Gadibidi Aliya	"Kannadada Kuvaranu" "Umma Beku Sye"	Koti	R. N. Jayagopal	Dr. Rajkumar, Manjula Gururaj, Sangeetha Katti	
1995	Hello Sister	"Kalla Kalli", "Hello Sister"	Koti	R. N. Jayagopal	Manjula Gururaj, SPB	
1995	Hendathi Endare Heegirabeku	"Baaro Rambe Balige"	Kashinath	Kashinath		
1995	Himapatha	"Love Bloody Love"	Hamsalekha	Hamsalekha	K. S. Chithra, Manjula Gururaj	
1995	Kavya	"Olumeya Kavya"	Sadhu Kokila	Doddarange Gowda	K. S. Chithra	
1995	Killer Diary	"Haalu Kodu Haalu"	Vijay Anand	Sri Ranga	SPB	
1995	Kona Edaithe	"Jackie Chan", "Oh Love", "Aaha Namma Konake"	Hamsalekha	Hamsalekha	S. Janaki; K. S. Chithra; C. Ashwath	
1995	Lady Police	"Lady Police"	Rajesh Ramanath	Ramesh Rao	Mangala, Namitha	
1995	Mangalya Sakshi	"Sanje Gaali"	Sadhu Kokila	S. Narayan	Chandrika Gururaj	
1995	Mother India	"Mareyona Ninneyanu", "Thandana Thana"	Sadhu Kokila	H. S. Venkateshamurthy	K. S. Chithra, Kusuma	
1995	Mruthyu Bandhana	"Kannu Kannu Seri", "Sidukidaru Nanna Nalla"	Peter Kamilose	Sri Chandru	Manjula Gururaj	
1995	Nischithartha	"Ee Sambrama", "Hosa Anubhava", "Olavina Bandha"	Sadhu Kokila	Bhangi Ranga	K. S. Chithra	
1995	Operation Antha	"Shame Shame"	V. Manohar	V. Manohar	L. N. Shastry	
1995	Savyasachi	"Naagara Haave"	Sadhu Kokila	Hamsalekha	SPB, K. S. Chithra, Mangala	
1995	Shubha Lagna	"Hello Dampathi"	Rajesh Ramanath	V. Manohar	Manjula Gururaj	
1995	Thaliya Sowbhagya	"Nannavale Nannavale"	Raju	R. N. Jayagopal	Swarnalatha	
1995	Thavaru Beegaru	"Bhale Bhale Jodi"	Sadhu Kokila	Sri Ranga	L. N. Shastry, Sujatha Dath	
1995	Thayi Illada Thavaru	"Mandara Mandara", "Prema Ganga Antharanga"	Hamsalekha	Hamsalekha	Latha Hamsalekha, K. S. Chithra	
1996	Aadithya	"Preethi Embuva"	Rajesh Ramanath	M. N. Vyasa Rao	K. S. Chithra	
1996	Annavra Makkalu	"Hogabeda Hudugi", "Aadabeku Raaja"	Rajesh Ramanath	V. Manohar	Chandrika Gururaj, Swarnalatha	
1996	Gajanura Gandu	"Muthu Rathnagala Lokake"	Sadhu Kokila	Sri Ranga	Sujatha Dath	
1996	Gulaabi	"Ooru Malaguthide"	Ilaiyaraaja	S. Narayan	K. S. Chithra	
1996	Hetthavala Koogu	"Raghavendra Ninna"	Vijaya Bhaskar	Vijaya Narasimha	Vani Jairam	
1996	Huliya	"Banna Bannadaramane"	Sadhu Kokila	Sri Ranga	Manjula Gururaj	
1996	Janumada Jodi	"Ivanyara Maganu", "Janumada Jodi Neenu", "Aarathi Annammange"	V. Manohar	V. Manohar, Doddarange Gowda	Manjula Gururaj	
1996	Jeevanadhi	"Navamaasa Ninnanu", "Sheshadrivaasa Sri Thirumalesha", "Daivada Karuneyu", "Ee Andada Chendada"	Koti	R. N. Jayagopal	Anuradha Paudwal, Manjula Gururaj	
1996	Kempu Mugilu	"Ee Namma Preethiya", "Tunthuru Maleya"	Sadhu Kokila	Shyamsundar Kulkarni, Ramesh Rao	SPB, Srilekha	
1996	Mane Mane Ramayana	"Ide Kanna Nota", "Cheluvina Ganiyu", "Baa Priya", "Manasu Manasu", "Mane Mane Ramayana"	Sadguna Raj	Su Rudramurthy Sastry	Chandrika Gururaj	
1996	Minugu Thaare	"Ondu Malenadina", "Kalpana Kalpana"	Rajesh Ramanath	M. N. Vyasa Rao	K. S. Chithra	
1996	Muddina Aliya	"Mutthu Mutthu", "Madhura Madhura"	V. Manohar	V. Manohar		
1996	Muddina Sose	"Rasikara Raja"	Upendra Kumar	R. N. Jayagopal	Dheerendra Gopal, Tennis Krishna	
1996	Nirbandha	"Kannanchali", "Nanna Ninna Prema"	Rajesh Ramanath	K. Kalyan, M. N. Vyasa Rao	Anuradha, Chandrika Gururaj	
1996	Nirnaya	"Love Mado", "Sangeetha Swara"	Rajesh Ramanath	R. N. Jayagopal	Sujatha Dath	
1996	Pattanakke Banda Putta	"Puttana Kattikolle"	V. Manohar	V. Manohar	Manjula Gururaj, Master Bharath	
1996	Rangoli	"Shaalu Baalu", "Mugile Mugile"	V. Manohar	V. Manohar	K. S. Chithra	
1996	Sathya Sangharsha	"Hana Hana", "Kurigalu Saar", "Ildoru Thappumaade", "Arivu Moodidare"	Sadhu Kokila	Doddarange Gowda	Surekha	
1996	Shreemathi Kalyana	"Nanna Ganda Mechida"	Sadhu Kokila	Sri Ranga	Mangala, Sadhu Kokila, Kusuma	
1996	Soubhagya Devathe	"Naa Hallo Endaga"	Srilekha	R. N. Jayagopal		
1996	Thavarina Thottilu	"Oh Kusumave"	Rajesh Ramanath	S. Narayan	K. S. Chithra	
1996	Vasantha Kavya	"Oyamma Oyamma", "Oho Giri Sundari"	Rajesh Ramanath	S. Narayan		
1996	Veerabhadra	"Halappa Halappa"	Hamsalekha	Hamsalekha	Latha Hamsalekha, Sulochana	
1997	Akka	"Akka Kele Akka", "Chicken Chicken Tandoori", "Rathriyadare Balu"	V. Manohar	V. Manohar	Manjula Gururaj; Suma Shastri	
1997	America! America!!	"Baanalli Odo Megha", "Nooru Janmaku", "America America", "Hegide Nam Desha"	Mano Murthy	Nagathihalli Chandrashekar	Sangeetha Katti, Ramesh Chandra, Manjula Gururaj	
1997	Ammavra Ganda	"Uma Rama Shama"	Raj	Shyamsundar Kulkarni		
1997	Anna Andre Nammanna	"Banthu Banthu", "Mutthu Mutthu", "Thalku Balku", "Vaare Vaare"	V. Manohar	Doddarange Gowda, Shyamsundar Kulkarni	Manjula Gururaj	
1997	Balina Daari	"Kodanda Rama", "Chumma Chumma"	K. Kalyan	K. Kalyan	Manjula Gururaj, L. N. Shastry, K. S. Chithra	
1997	Bhanda Alla Bahaddur	"Baare Baare Ningi", "Elu Eddelu", "Jamaayi Raja"	V. Manohar	V. Manohar	K. S. Chithra	
1997	Honeymoon	"Mutthu Male", "Nee Nanna Rangu"	Sarang	Bhangi Ranga	Manjula Gururaj	
1997	Jackie Chan	"Malle Malle", "Wake Up"	Sadhu Kokila	Sri Ranga	K. S. Chithra, Sadhu Kokila	
1997	Janani Janmabhoomi	"Aadutha Haadutha"	Rajan Nagendra	J. M. Prahlad		
1997	Jenina Hole	"Onde Nota" "Odi Odi Bandenu"	Rajesh Ramanath	Shyamsundar Kulkarni	K. S. Chithra, SPB	
1997	Jodi Hakki	"Kudure Eri Surya", "Jolly Jolly", "Neela Neela Neelambari"	V. Manohar	V. Manohar	K. S. Chithra	
1997	Laali	"Chandana Kampa", "Maya Maya", "Suvvi Suvvi", "Baagile Illade"	V. Manohar	K. Kalyan	K. S. Chithra	
1997	Mahabharatha	"Oho Shanthala"	K. Kalyan	K. Kalyan		
1997	Manava 2022	"O Shivane", "Hero Hero", "Cheluvina Kavithe", "Manavane Srustigaida"	Nanda	R. N. Jayagopal	Bombay Shailaja, Chandrika Gururaj	
1997	Mavana Magalu	"Ammanni Ammanni"	V. Manohar	V. Manohar	Manjula Gururaj	
1997	Mommaga	"Sri Ranganu", "O Hoogale"	Hamsalekha	Hamsalekha	K. S. Chithra	
1997	Mungarina Minchu	"Silence Silence", "Deepavalige", "Saki Shakuntala", "Hrudayada Anchinalli", "Vasanthadalli"	V. Manohar	V. Manohar	K. S. Chithra, Sowmya, Chandrika Gururaj, C. Ashwath, Suma Shastry	
1997	Nodu Baa Nammoora	"Phala Phala Holeyuva", "Ele Sampige", "Janejane Ee Sundara"	V. Manohar	V. Manohar; J M Prahlad	Manjula Gururaj	
1997	O Mallige	"Sevanthi Sevanthi", "Sura Sundara"	V. Manohar	V. Manohar	K. S. Chithra, Sowmya Raoh	
1997	Police Bete	"Kannada Nadidu"	Ram Chakravarthy	Ohileshwara		
1997	Ranganna	"Bandlu Bandlu", "Baaro Baaro", "Mangoli Mangol", "Aajare Aaja"	Rajesh Ramanath	Shyamsundar Kulkarni; Doddarange Gowda; K. Kalyan; Sri Ranga	Soumya; K. S. Chithra	
1997	Rangena Halliyage Rangada Rangegowda	"Poguve Ethake"	V. Manohar	V. Manohar	K. S. Chithra, V. Manohar	
1997	Rough and Tough	"Akkipete Cottonpete", "Elle Irali Hege Irali"	Sadhu Kokila	Sri Ranga, K. Kalyan	Kusuma	
1997	Shruti Hakida Hejje	"Maduve Mantra"	Ramani Bharadwaj	Geethapriya		
1997	Thayi Kotta Seere	"Arare Ee Preethiya"	K. Kalyan	K. Kalyan	Manjula Gururaj	
1997	Ulta Palta	"Hucchara Santhe"	V. Manohar	V. Manohar	V. Manohar	
1997	Zindabad	"Janma Bhoomi Idu"	V. Manohar	V. Manohar		
1998	A	"Sumsumne Nagthale"	Gurukiran	Upendra		
1998	Andaman	"Nenapu Nenapu"	Hamsalekha	Hamsalekha	K. S. Chithra	
1998	Anthargami	"Bayakeya Lathe Idu"	V. Manohar	V. Manohar		
1998	Baaro Nanna Muddina Krishna	"Hudugi Hudugi" "Lancha Lancha" "Matagathiye"	Prakash Trishuli	Sowmya		
1998	Bhama Sathyabhama	"Entha Sundara Lokavidu"	Rajesh Ramanath	S. Narayan	K. S. Chithra	
1998	Bhoomi Thayiya Chochchala Maga	"Le Le Le" "Saa Paa Ni Sa" "Naa Preethiya Huduga" "Jhumka Jhumka"	V. Manohar	V. Manohar	K. S. Chithra; Sowmya; Ramesh Chandra	
1998	Doni Sagali	"Ah Nidirege"	V. Manohar	V. Manohar	K. S. Chithra	
1998	Gadibidi Krishna	"Baare Baare"	Hamsalekha	Hamsalekha	Rathnamala Prakash	
1998	Hello Yama	"Dingu Dongu" "Rambha Beda Jambha"	Sadhu Kokila	A. R. Babu; Premkumar	Mangala, Kusuma; Sadhu Kokila, Doddanna, Sujatha Dath	
1998	Hendithghelthini	"Cheluve Cheluve" "Suvvale Suvvale"	V. Manohar	V. Manohar	K. S. Chithra	
1998	Jaidev	"Minchu Minchu" "Hello Hello" "Boobi Boobi"	Rajesh Ramanath	Sri Chandru; Sri Ranga; Shyamsundar Kulkarni	K. S. Surekha; Sowmya	
1998	Kurubana Rani	"Baare Nanna Kurubana Rani" "Yavvi Yaravvi" "Banna Bannada" "Baaravva Bhageerathi"	V. Manohar	K. Kalyan; Doddarange Gowda	Preethi Uttam Singh; K. S. Chithra	
1998	Mari Kannu Hori Myage	"Love Madutheenantha" "Matthade Besara"	Rajesh Ramanath	Prakash Trishuli	Sowmya	
1998	Megha Banthu Megha	"Hey Rama" "Hoove Hoove" "Jam Antha Hudugi"	V. Manohar	V. Manohar	Manjula Gururaj; Ramesh Chandra	
1998	Nammura Huduga	"Jari Jari" "Nammoor Hudga"	V. Manohar	V. Manohar; Doddarange Gowda		
1998	Number One	"Belli Chukki Baale"	Sadhu Kokila	K. Kalyan	K. S. Chithra	
1998	Shanti Shanti Shanti	"Bangalore Huduga" "Elaley" "Thakka Thakka Dhimi" "Imbiya Hanna"	Sandeep Chowta	Soumya; Sanjeev Wadhwani; Malgudi Subha; Sujatha Dath		
1998	Simhada Guri	"Banthu Kamanabillu" "Nannede Goodina"	Shiva	Bhangi Ranga	Manjula Gururaj; Suneetha	
1998	Sindhu	"Pongalu Sakkare Pongalu" "Shubhayoga Bali Bandide"	Sadguna Raj	S. Keshavamurthy	Chandrika Gururaj	
1998	Suvvi Suvvalali	"Engagementappo" "Ayya Ayya" "Mounave Mounave"	Hamsalekha	Hamsalekha	Ramesh Chandra, Manjula Gururaj, L. N. Shastry, K. S. Chithra	
1998	Swasthik	"Idu Yelelu Janumada" "Minchula Minchadiru" "Jee Jee Kya Jee"	V. Manohar	Upendra	Shankar Shanbag; Suma Shastry; Upendra	
1998	Thavarina Kanike	"Aparanji Jodigalige" "Enthaha Jadoo" "Chandra Mancha"	V. Manohar	V. Manohar	Manjula Gururaj	
1998	Thayiya Runa	"Amma Ninna Munde" "Praya Moodi"	Ragaraja	Doddarange Gowda	Kusuma, L. N. Shastry, Sangeetha Katti	
1998	Thriller Killer	"Premavendare" "Roja O My Roja" "Thavare Kendavare"	Shree	K. Kalyan	K. S. Chithra	
1998	Veeranna	"O Premada Thutturi" "Mungara Navilu"	S. P. Raj	Doddarange Gowda	Sowmya	
1998	Yamalokadalli Veerappan	"Bittakku Ee Kaadu"	Sadhu Kokila	Sri Ranga	Mangala	
1999	Aaha Nanna Maduveyanthe	"Chandanave Malligeye" "Dam Dam Dam" "Kali Kali Nodi Kali" "Sona Sona"	V. Manohar	V. Manohar; K. Kalyan; Sri Chandru	Vijayalakshmi	
1999	AK 47	"Yaare Anjuburuki"	Hamsalekha	Hamsalekha	K. S. Chithra	
1999	Arunodaya	"Oho Vayyara" "Uyyale Uyyale"	Hamsalekha	Hamsalekha		
1999	Chaitrada Chiguru	"Jeevanada Kanasella" "Megha Megha" "Nagu Nagu Nagutha"	V. Manohar	Doddarange Gowda; V. Manohar; K. Kalyan	Pallavi; Badri Prasad, B. R. Chaya	
1999	Channappa Channegowda	"Ee Channappa Channegowda"	Hamsalekha	Hamsalekha		
1999	Coolie Raja	"Naanu Coolie" "Yaro Ee Haida" "Lakkamma" "Mysooru Malle" "Manasina Goodalli"	Hamsalekha	Hamsalekha	K. S. Chithra; Sunitha; Latha Hamsalekha	
1999	Dalavayi	"Apple Apple" "Habba Habba"	Hamsalekha	Hamsalekha	Latha Hamsalekha; Nanditha, Ramesh Chandra	
1999	Drona	"Yaarinda Hoovondu"	Hamsalekha	Hamsalekha	K. S. Chithra	
1999	Habba	"Jenina Goodu Naavella" "Yaale Yaale" "Channappa Channegowda" "Habba Habba" "Onde Usiranthe"	Hamsalekha	Hamsalekha	K. S. Chithra; Ramesh Chandra; Nanditha; Vishnu	
1999	Hrudaya Hrudaya	"Ivale Nanna Rani"	Hamsalekha	Hamsalekha	Shiva Rajkumar, Manjula Gururaj	
1999	Idu Entha Premavayya	"Andada Chandramancha"	Gurukiran	K. Kalyan	Manjula Gururaj	
1999	Janumadatha	"Bombu Hako Desha" "Saagara Theeradi"	V. Manohar	V. Manohar; B. S. Madhumathi	Sangeetha Katti	
1999	Kanooru Heggadithi	"Hoguvenu Naa"	B. V. Karanth	Kuvempu		
1999	Kubera	"Maaraanis Ammannis" "Oscar Banthu Oscar" "Twinkle Twinkle"	Rajesh Ramanath	K. Kalyan	K. S. Chithra; Nanditha	
1999	Meese Hottha Gandasige Demandappo Demandu	"Saalappo Salappo" "Dikki Dikki" "Kempi Kempi" "Amma Lottery"	Hamsalekha	Hamsalekha	Sunitha Prakash; Latha Hamsalekha	
1999	Nanenu Madlilla	"Naanenu Madlilla" "Beladingalu Beladingalu"	K. Kalyan	K. Kalyan	K. S. Chithra	
1999	Nannaseya Hoove	"Nesara" "Hombale Hombale" "Enagoythamma" "Lachmi Lachmi" "Hennu Chanda Hennu" "Jaakai Jaapatre"	Hamsalekha	Hamsalekha	K. S. Chithra; Latha Hamsalekha	
1999	O Premave	"O Jambada Koli"	V. Ravichandran	K. Kalyan	Suma Shastry	
1999	Patela	"Ammanannu Kaanada"	Hamsalekha	Hamsalekha		
1999	Prathibhatane	"Varadakshine" "Sarasakke Baare" "Hasuvina" "Baale Naviloora" "Chori Chori"	V. Manohar	V. Manohar	K. S. Chithra	
1999	Premachari	"Rannano" "Yaari Premachari" "Tharikere Erimele" "Chellidaro Malligeya"	Hamsalekha	Hamsalekha	K. S. Chithra; Latha Hamsalekha; Ramesh Chandra	
1999	Premotsava	"Mathugathi Missamma"	Praveen Dutt	Shyamsundar Kulkarni		
1999	Ravimama	"Priya Priya Preethiya"	L. N. Shastry	S. Narayan	K. S. Chithra	
1999	Snehaloka	"Loka Snehaloka" "Ooty Beauty" "Onde Usiranthe" "Thamta Takita" "Yarige Yaru Illa"	Hamsalekha	Hamsalekha	K. S. Chithra; Suresh Peters; Ramesh Chandra	
1999	Surya Vamsha	"Meghagala Baagilali" "Belli Chukki Baninalli" "Chukki Chukki"	V. Manohar	S. Narayan; Shyamsundar Kulkarni	K. S. Chithra; Nanditha	
1999	Tuvvi Tuvvi Tuvvi	"Billi Billi" "Bande Naanu"	Hamsalekha	Hamsalekha	Manjula Gururaj	
1999	Upendra	"Raveena"	Gurukiran	Upendra	Annupamaa	
1999	Veerappa Nayaka	"Are Jing Jingale" "Ee Adaradali" "O Ambarave"	Rajesh Ramanath	S. Narayan	K. S. Chithra; Nanditha	
1999	Vishwa	"Anna Anna"	Hamsalekha	Hamsalekha	K. S. Chithra, Mano, Latha Hamsalekha	
1999	Z	"Prema Prema"	Rajesh Ramanath	K. Praveen Nayak	Sowmya	
1999	Bombat Halwa	"Andhada Jokumara"	Sarang	Bhangi Ranga	Manjula Paramesh	

=== 2000–2009 ===
Year	Film	Song(s)	Music composer	Lyricist	Co-singer(s)	Notes
2000	Andhra Hendthi	"Hakki Pakki" "Swara Raga" "Cham Cham" "Kannige Habba" "Pranaya Bayasi" "Masthu Masthu Hudugi" "Kaddu Kaddu Nodabeda"	Shivamaya	Sri Chandru; V. Manohar	Nanditha; Sujatha Dath; Murali	
2000	Bannada Hejje	"Meenu Eeji" "Nagubandaru Alubandaru"	Hamsalekha	Hamsalekha		Winner - Karnataka State Film Award for Best Male Playback Singer
2000	Bhagavan Dada	"Kaasu Huttodu" "Om Shivane"	Rajesh Ramanath	K. Kalyan		
2000	Bhakta Ayyappa	"Omkara Pranavanaada"	Gandharva	V. Nagendra Prasad		
2000	Bharatha Naari	"Dilwale Aseyagide" "Sweekarisu Sweekarisu" "Thumbthumbikondu"	Hamsalekha	Hamsalekha	Sangeetha Katti; Sowmya	
2000	Bhoomi	"Maalige Maneya"	Gandharva	Gandharva		
2000	Deepavali	"Nooraru Banna Seri"	M. M. Keeravani	K. Kalyan	Nanditha	
2000	Devara Maga	"Ye Nanji" "Thayilla Thavarilla" "Vasantha Bhoomige"	Hamsalekha	Hamsalekha	Manjula Gururaj; K. S. Chithra; Anuradha Paudwal	
2000	Gajina Mane	"Belli Baana" "Bevu Bella" "Huduga E Huduga"	Gandharva	V. Nagendra Prasad	Manjula Gururaj; Sowmya	
2000	Galate Aliyandru	"Kundapurada Meenamma"	Deva	S. Narayan	L. N. Shastry, Shiva Rajkumar	
2000	Hagalu Vesha	"Beladingala Benne Kaddu" "Eai Thundu Naadina"	Hamsalekha	Hamsalekha	K. S. Chithra	
2000	Hats Off India	"You Read Love" "Kannada Chitrava" "Naadirdhinna"	Hamsalekha	Hamsalekha	Latha Hamsalekha	
2000	Jee Boomba	"Chukku Bukku"	Sadhu Kokila	Sri Ranga	Sowmya	
2000	Jeevana Raga	"Ileya Manamohini"	Rajesh Ramanath	Doddarange Gowda	K. S. Chithra	
2000	Kadlimatti Station Master	"Kadlimattiya Gandu" "Aiholeya Shilpagale"	Amarapriya		Sujatha Dath; Chandrika Gururaj	
2000	Khiladi	"Monica I am from America"	Sadhu Kokila	Sri Ranga	Nanditha	
2000	Krishna Leele	"Kande Kande" "Kachaguli Huduga"	V. Manohar	R. N. Jayagopal; K. Kalyan	Nanditha	
2000	Mahathma	"Naanu Neenu"	V. Ravichandran	K. Kalyan	Suma Shastry	
2000	Mava Mava Maduve Mado	"Usire Mellusire" "Ee Hetthordonde Drama"	L. N. Shastry	K. Kalyan	Archana Udupa; L. N. Shastry, Mangala, Suma Shastry, M. R. Ramesh	
2000	Nan Hendthi Chennagidale	"Nanna Hendthi" "Maduve Madi" "Bhoomigondu Banna"	Rajesh Ramanath	K. Kalyan		
2000	Nannavalu Nannavalu	"Nannavalu Nannavalu"	Prashanth Raj	K. Kalyan		
2000	Papigala Lokadalli	"Andha Anubandha" "Chumma Chumma"	Sadhu Kokila	K. Kalyan	Nanditha	
2000	Poli Bhava	"ABCD Kaliyuva" "Sixu Sixu"	M. S. Maruthi	Bhangi Ranga	Chandrika Gururaj; Sujatha Dath	
2000	Preethse	"Holi Holi"	Hamsalekha	Hamsalekha	SPB, K. S. Chithra, Anuradha Paudwal	
2000	Premi	"Ellinda Hege Bandalu"	N. Govardhan	Anamika		
2000	Soorappa	"Badavan Mane Oota" "Yaru Kanada Saptasagara" "Mangala Ragada"	Hamsalekha	Hamsalekha	K. S. Chithra	
2000	Sparsha	"Managala Sarigama" "Sangathi Heegeke Nee Doora"	Hamsalekha	Hamsalekha	Archana Udupa; K. S. Chithra	
2000	Sulthan	"Thande Post" "Kalla Kalla" "Yamange Bari" "Soundarya Hennayito"	Hamsalekha	Hamsalekha	Sunitha; Ramesh Chandra	
2000	Sundara Purusha	"Thirupathiya Srinivasa" "Preethi Huttuva" "Sundara Sundara"	Sadhu Kokila	Sri Chandru	Sowmya	
2000	Swalpa Adjust Madkolli	"Baduku Olavina" "Chali Chali" "Aisa Aisa" "Chandavalli"	Sadhu Kokila	Sri Chandru; V. Manohar; K. Kalyan	K. S. Chithra; Nanditha	
2000	Uttara Dhruvadim Dakshina Dhruvaku	"Uttara Dhruvadim"	Vijay Anand	Abbas Abbalagere	Archana Udupa	
2000	Yajamana	"O Maina O Maina" "Prema Chandrama" "Mysooru Mallige" "Namma Maneyali" "Shree Gandhada Gombe"	Rajesh Ramanath	K. Kalyan	K. S. Chithra; SPB	
2000	Yare Nee Abhimani	"Ramya Krishna" "Vasa Vasa Srinivasa" "Hello Usire"	Hamsalekha	Hamsalekha	K. S. Chithra	
2000	Yaarige Saluthe Sambala	"Yaarige Saluthe" "Deepadinda Deepa" "Male Ah Female Ah" "Shravana Veeneya"	Hamsalekha	Hamsalekha	Hemanth, Ramesh Chandra, Archana Udupa, Nanditha, Manjula Gururaj, G V Athri; Latha Hamsalekha	
2001	Amma Ninna Tholinalli	"Arere Bannada Loka" "Sambhrama Sambhrama"	L. N. Shastry	K. Kalyan	Sowmya; Sangeetha Katti	
2001	Anjali Geethanjali	"Anjali Geethanjali" "Oho Panchamiye"	Prashanth Raj	S. Narayan	K. S. Chithra	
2001	Asura	"Maha Ganapati" "Karuneye Illada" "Nangu Modalu Ningu Modalu" "Preethige Beleyilla" "Enu Madideyo"	Gurukiran	K. Kalyan	Nanditha; K. S. Chithra	
2001	Aunty Preethse	"Dayana Dayana" "Preethi Kadalalli" "Sneha Deepavali"	L. N. Shastry	K. Kalyan	K. S. Chithra; Hemanth; L. N. Shastry	
2001	Avaran Bit Ivaran Bit Avaryaar	"Hey Kande Kande" "Hua Kya Hua" "See Cinema"	Hamsalekha	Hamsalekha	Hemanth, Nanditha, Divya; Latha Hamsalekha; Soumya Rao	
2001	Baanallu Neene Bhuviyallu Neene	"Nenapugale Sukha"	Prashanth Raj	S. Narayan	Anuradha Sriram	
2001	Chitte	"Namma Mane Angalada" "Chitte Chitte" "Belaku Iruva" "Olagadi Yaru Illa"	V. Manohar	V. Manohar	K. S. Chithra	
2001	Gatti Mela	"Banthu Banthu Preethi"	Hamsalekha	Hamsalekha	Nanditha	
2001	Halappa	"Jambhadambaari" "Preethiya Belaku" "Hrudayava" "Nandi Yeri Baa" "Halakki Halakki"	Sadhu Kokila	Sri Ranga	K. S. Chithra; Sujatha Dath	
2001	Huchcha	"Usire Usire"	Rajesh Ramanath	K. Kalyan		
2001	Jenugoodu	"Jenugoodinanthe" "Mamatheya Bandhana"	Prashanth Raj	S. Narayan		
2001	Kalla Police	"Priya Priyathame" "Prema Kogile" "Chandana Kinthaa"	Gandharva	Gandharva	Manjula Gururaj	
2001	Kurigalu Saar Kurigalu	"Sondi Sondi"	Hamsalekha	Hamsalekha	Hemanth, Ramesh Chandra	
2001	Mafia	"Jagave Jebinalli"	Gopi Krishna	Hamsalekha	Hemanth, Mangala	
2001	Mahalakshmi	"Aakashadaache"	N. Govardhan	Ramesh Rao	Nanditha	
2001	Mathadana	"Idu Modalane Haadu" "Olavali Haadithe Hamsa" "Aidu Varshakkomme" "Aluva Kadalolu"	C. Ashwath; V. Manohar	V. Manohar; Siddalingaiah; Gopalakrishna Adiga	Nanditha; K. S. Surekha, M. D. Pallavi; B. R. Chaya	
2001	Namma Samsara Ananda Sagara	"Masthu Masthu Kushiyalli" "Kanaso Nanaso" "Preethi Namma Balige" "Namma Samsara" "Laila Laila"	Prashanth Raj	Sri Chandru		
2001	Nanna Preethiya Hudugi	"Adeke Kothi Moothi" "Baa Baaro"	Mano Murthy	Nagathihalli Chandrashekar	Sangeetha Katti; Anuradha Paudwal	
2001	Neela	"Aa Meru Ee Meru"	Vijaya Bhaskar	Kotiganahalli Ramayya	Vani Jairam	
2001	Sarovara	"O Chukkigale" "Geethanjali" "Banna Bannada"	K. Kalyan	K. Kalyan	Nagachandrika; Badri Prasad	
2001	Shaapa	"Ee Nadiyalli"	Hamsalekha	Hamsalekha	K. S. Chithra	
2001	Sundara Neenu Sundari Nanu	"Naa Sundara Nee Sundari" "Raja Rani"	Rajesh Ramanath	K. Kalyan	Nanditha; Archana Udupa	
2001	Thimmaraya	"Kamsale" "Ninna Bittu"	Sadhu Kokila	Bhangi Ranga	L. N. Shastry, Suma Shastry	
2001	Vaalee	"Mele Chandrana"	Rajesh Ramanath	K. Kalyan	Anuradha Sriram	
2001	Vishalakshammana Ganda	"Rasaane Kudidare"	Prashanth Raj	Sri Chandru	Mahalakshmi Iyer, Archana Udupa, Ramesh Chandra	
2001	Yaarige Beda Duddu	"Meghave Meghave" "Yaarige Beda" "Yamma Yamma"	M N Krupakar	Doddarange Gowda; M. N. Krupakar	Tennis Krishna; Nanditha; Sujatha Dath	
2002	Annayya Thammayya	"Chukki Baale Chukki Baale"	Prashanth Raj	S. Narayan	Nanditha	
2002	Balagalittu Olage Baa	"Hey Rama Rama"	Hamsalekha	Hamsalekha	Archana Udupa	
2002	Balarama	"Entha Chanda Nodi" "Seere Utta Singari" "Veermanre" "Rama Balarama"	Hamsalekha	Hamsalekha	Sangeetha Katti; Divya Raghavan; Latha Hamsalekha	
2002	Bhootayyana Makkalu	"Rambe Rambe" "Savira Kavigala" "Oho Chaitrave" "Jogada Siri Belakinalli" "Beladingala Ooralli" "Koti Prema Kathegalu"	Rajesh Ramanath	K. S. Chithra		
2002	Chandu	"Avala Olava Nage"	Gurukiran	K. Kalyan		
2002	Cheluve Ondu Heltheeni	"Idu Preethiya Darbaru"	Hamsalekha	Hamsalekha	Latha Hamsalekha	
2002	Dakota Express	"Jhum Anthu"	Hamsalekha	Hamsalekha	K. S. Chithra	
2002	Ekangi	"Hudugi Superamma" "Nee Madid Thappa"	V. Ravichandran	V. Ravichandran	Suresh Peters, Annupamaa	
2002	H2O	"I want to Kiss"	Sadhu Kokila	Upendra	Prathima Rao	
2002	Jamindaru	"Ganga Ganga"	M. M. Keeravani	S. Narayan	Manjula Gururaj	
2002	Kitty	"Munjane Munjane" "Silku Silku"	Gurukiran	V. Nagendra Prasad	Nanditha; Shamitha Malnad	
2002	Kodanda Rama	"Dumdoola"	V. Ravichandran	V. Ravichandran	L. N. Shastry, Hemanth	
2002	Love U	"Mounave Mounave"	Gurukiran	K. Kalyan		
2002	Majestic	"Naane Naane" "Thangali Mele"	Sadhu Kokila	V. Nagendra Prasad	Anuradha Sriram	
2002	Makeup	"Bhol Bhol" "Dimple Dimple" "Jaka Jaka Janaka"	John	K. Kalyan	Nanditha	
2002	Manasella Neene	"Preethiye Ninna" "Jheer Jimbe" "Arathi Arathi"	Raviraj	V. Manohar; Belur Ramamurthy	Swarnalatha	
2002	Nagarahavu	"Ede Chippinalli" "I want to say"	Hamsalekha	Hamsalekha	K. S. Chithra; Anuradha Sriram	
2002	Neela Megha Shyama	"Natakushina" "Preethsodalli" "Sangama Jeeva" "Uli Uli"	Prashanth Raj	Raj Kishore	Archana Udupa; Nanditha; Baby Sindhu	
2002	Ninagagi	"Ellelli Naa Nodali"	Gurukiran	K. Kalyan		
2002	Ninagoskara	"Rexona Luxona"	L. N. Shastry	K. Kalyan	Sujatha Dath	
2002	Ninne Preethisuve	"Prema Pathra" "Kogileya Haadu" "Olave Nanna Olave" "Nanna Preethiya" "Gudiya Ganteyu" "Ninna Preethiya"	Rajesh Ramanath	K. Kalyan	K. S. Chithra	
2002	Police Officers	"Nammamma Annamma" "Soundarya Nachide" "Hosa Hudugi"	Shivamaya	Sri Ranga	Sujatha Dath; Sowmya	
2002	Preethi Mado Hudugarigella	"Harere Harere"	Hamsalekha	Hamsalekha	Latha Hamsalekha	
2002	Prema Khaidi	"Yenaagoythoo"	Prashanth Raj	V. Nagendra Prasad	Nanditha	
2002	Punjabi House	"Kanda Kanasella" "Henne Sundara" "Higgi Higgi"	Anantha Rajan	Rudramurthy Shastry; Shyamsundar Kulkarni	Chandrika Gururaj	
2002	Shabda	"Nanna Jeevave"	M. N. Krupakar	Rajendra Babu	Nanditha	
2002	Simhadriya Simha	"Malnad Adike"	Deva	S. Narayan	SPB, Chandrika Gururaj	
2002	Tapori	"Kaantha Kaantha"	Hamsalekha	Hamsalekha	Divya Raghavan	
2002	Vamshakkobba	"Rani Nanna Rani"	Sadhu Kokila	V. Nagendra Prasad	Nanditha	
2003	Dumbee	"Macche Macche" "Haayiro" "Kshamiseya"	Hamsalekha	Aadarsh; Hamsalekha	Archana Udupa	
2003	Daali	"Prema Kogile"	Kumar Eshwar	K. Kalyan	Anuradha Sriram	
2003	Laali Haadu	"Koti Koti Hoogalige" "Magale Magale"	Sadhu Kokila	K. Kalyan	Shamitha Malnad	
2003	Pakka Chukka	"Yavva Yavva" "Ghal Ghal"	S. Narayan	S. Narayan	K. S. Chithra	
2003	Neenandre Ishta	"Nange Neene Ishta"	Bharadwaj	V. Nagendra Prasad	Anuradha Sriram	
2003	Mooru Manasu Nooru Kanasu	"Kannada Devara Prema" "Monica Monica" "Yoganu Yogavo"	L. N. Shastry	V. Nagendra Prasad; Sai Chandra	Nanditha; Sowmya	
2003	Nimma Preethiya Huduga	"Naa Ninna Preethiya"	S. P. Venkatesh	K. Kalyan	Nanditha	
2003	Katthegalu Saar Katthegalu	"Eno Thumba Kushiyagidya" "Sathyavantharige"	Hamsalekha	Hamsalekha	Hemanth, Chetan Sosca, Nandini	
2003	Hello	"Roja Roja" "Singapuradalli"	Shrishyla	K. Kalyan	Nanditha	
2003	Paris Pranaya	"Aa Biliyara Deshada"	Prayog	Nagathihalli Chandrashekar	K. S. Chithra, Madhu Balakrishnan	
2003	Nee Illade Naa Illa Kane	"Preethi Madu Bare"	Shrishyla	Sri Chandru	Shamitha Malnad	
2003	Kushalave Kshemave	"Bhagavantha" "Aa Devara" "Babilona Babilona" "Telephone Gelathi" "Nannolave Nannolave"	Rajesh Ramanath	K. Kalyan	K. S. Chithra	
2003	Lankesh Patrike	"Endo Kanda Kanasu"	Babji-Sandeep	K. Kalyan	Kavita Krishnamurthy	
2003	Black and White	"O Nanna Chooti" "Jaga Ondu Devalaya"	Rajesh Ramanath	K. Kalyan		
2003	Ooh La La	"Dumbi Banthu"	Suresh Devakumar	Anand	Nanditha	
2003	Hudugigaagi	"Jaanathi Jaanarinda"	Babji-Sandeep	Shashank	Nanditha	
2003	Nanjundi	"Koli Ko Koli"	Hamsalekha	Hamsalekha		
2003	Kasu Iddone Basu	"Kasu Iddone" "Innu Yaake"	V. Manohar	V. Manohar		
2003	Lovve Pasagali	"Ye Gelathi"	Hamsalekha	Hamsalekha	B. Jayashree	
2003	Raktha Kanneeru	"Kanneridu Raktha Kanneridu"	Sadhu Kokila	Upendra		
2003	Hrudayavantha	"Annayya Hrudayavantha"	Hamsalekha	Hamsalekha	K. S. Chithra	
2003	Chigurida Kanasu	"Shubhayoga Koodi Banthamma"	V. Manohar	V. Manohar	Nanditha	
2003	Ondagona Baa	"Eno Madi Madide" "Lovvisu Nanna Kissisu"	Hamsalekha	Hamsalekha	Nanditha; Mahalakshmi Iyer	
2003	Hucchana Maduveli Undone Jana	"Barayya Poli" "Jhum Jhum" "Mohabbath Moodibanthu" "Neene Neene"	Prashanth Raj	V. Nagendra Prasad	Nanditha	
2003	Ree Swalpa Bartheera	"Ninage Neene" "Chithrada Chora" "Mysooru Henne" "Cham Cham"	Venkat-Narayan	T. Nagaraj	Shamitha Malnad; Nanditha	
2003	Daasa	"Preethisu Baa" "Yavalappa Rani"	Sadhu Kokila	K. Kalyan	Nanditha; Anuradha Sriram	
2003	Partha	"Ee Preethi"	Gurukiran	Kaviraj		
2003	Excuse Me	"Preethige Janma"	R. P. Patnaik	V. Nagendra Prasad		
2003	Dhad Dhad	"Yene Kampana"	Madhukar	Ananth	Nanditha	
2003	Mani	"Nanna Edeya"	Raja	K. Kalyan	M. D. Pallavi	
2003	Annavru	"Ah Mavina Thopinalli" "Dimdima Dolu Badi"	Rajesh Ramanath	K. Kalyan	Nanditha; Hemanth	
2003	Swathi Muthu	"Suvvi Suvvi" "Mangalya" "Andada Chendada" "Amma Dharma" "Manasu Bareda"	Rajesh Ramanath	V. Nagendra Prasad	K. S. Chithra; Nanditha	
2004	Abbabba Entha Huduga	"Say Say Endide Manasu"	Suresh Kumar	V. Nagendra Prasad	K. S. Chithra	
2004	Om Ganesh	"Manase Manase"	M. N. Krupakar	M. N. Krupakar	K. S. Chithra	
2004	Dharma	"Meghashyama Baa"	Hamsalekha	Hamsalekha	Nanditha	
2004	Teenagers	"Baaninalliyu" "I Love You" "Preethine Ambara"	M. N. Krupakar		Nanditha	
2004	Maha Sambhrama	"Hunnime Chellida" "Belura Shileyante" "Manujararannu" "Ileya Belago"	Sangeetha Priya	V. Nagendra Prasad	Nanditha	
2004	Sagari	"21st Century" "Ee Lokave Sundara"	Sadhu Kokila	Sri Chandru	Hemanth	
2004	Y2K	"Bidenu Bidenu"	Sadhu Kokila	Ram Narayan	Swarnalatha	
2004	Darshan	"O Surya Ninage" "Saalu Saalinalli"	Sadhu Kokila	V. Nagendra Prasad	Nanditha	
2004	Ranga SSLC	"Chitte Chitte" "Manase Manase"	Sandeep Chowta	V. Nagendra Prasad	Shamitha Malnad; K. S. Chithra	
2004	Monalisa	"Ee Manasella Neene" "O Priyathame"	Valisha-Sandeep	K. Kalyan; V. Nagendra Prasad	Shreya Ghoshal	
2004	Hendthi Andre Hendthi	"Jeeva Gange" "Hendthi Andre Hendthi" "Vandane Hrudayave" "Vandane Vandane"	Gopikrishna	K. Kalyan	K. S. Chithra; Manjula Gururaj; Divya Raghavan	
2004	Nija	"Priyathama Priyathama"	Raj Bharath	Sri Ranga	Nanditha	
2004	Rama Krishna	"Gili Gili Giliye"	S. A. Rajkumar	V. Nagendra Prasad	Mathangi	
2004	Baa Baaro Rasika	"Sakhi O Sakhi"	Mahesh	Shashank	Nanditha	
2004	Sakhi	"Nannase Hoove" "Yari Sakhi"	L. N. Shastry	K. Kalyan	K. S. Chithra; Suma Shastry	
2004	Love	"Jil Jil" "Twinkle Twinkle"	A. R. Rahman; Anu Malik	K. Kalyan	Lakshmi Nataraj	
2004	Gowdru	"En Gowdre" "Helu Hamsa Pakshi" "Gandhada Pada" "Male Banda"	Hamsalekha	Hamsalekha	Hemanth, Nanditha; Archana Udupa; Divya Raghavan	
2004	Sarvabhouma	"Saare Jahan Se Acha"	Hamsalekha	Hamsalekha	Nanditha	
2004	Bhagawan	"Jeeva Jeevakke" "Chandrana Ooralli"	Rajesh Ramanath	Dwarki; K. Kalyan	Lakshmi Manmohan; Nanditha	
2004	Ajju	"Na Manasothenu" "Ee Premadaramba" "Anuraga Anuraga"	Rajesh Ramanath	Sri Chandru	Shamitha Malnad; Priyadarshini	
2004	Pakkadmane Hudugi	"Anda Chendada" "Nanna Muddina" "Aha Chatura Naari" "Ondondu Hoovigu" "O Premave"	Rajesh Ramanath	Thadur Keshav; Ramnarayan; K. Kalyan	L. N. Shastry; Lakshmi Manmohan	
2004	Bidalaare	"Yenu Naguve"	Indra KM	Indra KM	K. S. Chithra	
2004	Apthamitra	"Baara Baara" "Raara Sarasaku Raara"	Gurukiran	Goturi	Nithyashree Mahadevan; Nanditha	
2004	Shuklambaradharam	"Suvvi Suvvale" "Manujana Baalalli" "Jigi Jigidu" "Shuklambaradharam"	S. P. Chandrakanth	S. Jagannath	Mahalakshmi Iyer; Nanditha	
2004	Praana	"Idu Enidenidu"	Alwyn Fernandes	Sri Chandru	Sowmya	
2004	Kalasipalya	"Kencha O Kencha" "Suntaragali Suntaragali"	Sadhu Kokila	K. Kalyan	Nanditha; Malathy Lakshman	
2004	Nalla	"Malage Malage Gubbimari"	Venkat Narayan	V. Nagendra Prasad		
2004	Santhosha	"Ee Baduku Sundara" "Chamile Chamile"	Prayog	Nagathihalli Chandrashekar; M. N. Vyasa Rao	Shamitha Malnad	
2004	Trin Trin	"Love Me"	Rajesh Ramanath	K. Kalyan	Nanditha	
2004	Aliya Mane Tholiya	"Oppikondavarige Omkara"	Rajesh Ramanath	K. Kalyan		
2004	Joke Falls	"Gandhavathi" "Swaraga Shrusti Modala"	Mano Murthy	V. Nagendra Prasad	Chetan Sosca	
2004	Saradara	"Kanninalli Preethi" "Pipi Dollu" "Gili Gili"	Venkat Narayan	V. Nagendra Prasad		
2004	Jyeshta	"O Kanchana" "Nennegala Nenapugale" "Lolakku Jhumaki"	S. A. Rajkumar	K. Kalyan	K. S. Chithra; Karthik, Kalpana Raghavendar	
2005	Maharaja	"Kuni Kuni" "Santheya Beediyalli" "Gopala Gopala"	S. A. Rajkumar	K. Kalyan; V. Nagendra Prasad	Manjula Gururaj; Kalpana	
2005	Rishi	"Sogase Sogase"	Gurukiran	V. Manohar	Gurukiran, Chetan Sosca	
2005	Olave	"Kanyakumari Kanyakumari"	B. R. Hemanth	V. Manohar		
2005	Yashwanth	"Moda Modalu"	Mani Sharma	Kaviraj	Nanditha	
2005	Inspector Jhansi	"Praya Praya"	Sameer Sen - Dilip Sen	V. Nagendra Prasad	K. S. Chithra	
2005	Jootata	"Oh Sona"	R. P. Patnaik	Kaviraj	R. P. Patnaik	
2005	Kashi from Village	"Nooraru Kaala" "Andave Andave" "Happy Happy Birthday"	Koti	K. Kalyan	Lakshmi Manmohan; Mano	
2005	Preethisu	"Ninne Preethisuve" "Nanna Bala Jyothi"	Theja	Siddaraju	Nanditha	
2005	Aakash	"Enidu Ee Dina"	R. P. Patnaik	K. Kalyan		
2005	Gunna	"O My Love"	Mahesh	Dwarki	K. S. Chithra	
2005	Mr. Bakra	"Hannu Magide" "Rajani Rathi"	V. Manohar	V. Manohar	Nanditha	
2005	Aham Premasmi	"Praya Praya"	V. Ravichandran	V. Ravichandran	Anuradha Sriram	
2005	Nan Love Madthiya	"Nanna Nee Ninna" "O Nanna Usire"	Mysore Gopi	Hamsalekha	Ujjaini; Divya Raghavan	
2005	Sye	"Baare Baa Baa"	Gurukiran	Kaviraj	Mangala	
2005	Masala	"Sparshana" "Adalu Badalu"	Sadhu Kokila	Manjunath Rao; Kaviraj	Lakshmi	
2005	Siddu	"Soorya Thampu"	R. P. Patnaik	Kaviraj	Shreya Ghoshal	
2005	Valmiki	"Ale Ale"	Gurukiran	Kaviraj		
2005	Abhinandane	"Suryanige Benne" "Pakka Pakka" "Hucchanaade" "Mounada Modalakshara" "Madhura Madhura" "Devaraane"	K. Kalyan	K. Kalyan	Nanditha	
2005	Auto Shankar	"Kabadi Kabadi"	Gurukiran	Kaviraj	Malathy Lakshman	
2005	Amrithadhare	"Gelathi Gelathi"	Mano Murthy	Nagathihalli Chandrashekar	Nanditha	
2005	Boyfriend	"Muriye Mounana" "Hegiddavalle"	Indra KM	Indra KM	Nanditha; M. D. Pallavi	
2005	Swamy	"Gaali Bandaaga"	Gurukiran	Kaviraj	Chaitra H. G.	
2005	Samarasimha Naika	"Chaitrave Ninna"	M. N. Krupakar	M. N. Krupakar	Nanditha	
2005	Shambu	"Radhe Radhe"	Ramesh Krishna	Anand	K. S. Chithra	
2005	Love Story	"Nanna Ninna" "Yaare Neenu Cheluve"	S. A. Rajkumar	K. Kalyan	Shamitha Malnad	
2005	Sakha Sakhi	"Ammanni Ammanni"	Sadhu Kokila	Sri Ranga	Malathi, Latha	
2006	Mandya	"Moriya Oh Bappa"	Gurukiran	Kaviraj		
2006	O Priyathama	"Mareyadiru Ee Preethiya"	Valisha-Sandeep	K. Kalyan	Nanditha	
2006	Shree	"Yaro Neenu" "Deepa Deepa"	Valisha-Sandeep	Kaviraj; V. Manohar	Nanditha; K. S. Chithra	
2006	Seven O' Clock	"Ee Dina Kushiyagide"	M. S. Madhukar	K. Ram Narayan	Nithya Santhoshini	
2006	My Autograph	"Malli Hudugi" "Nannavalu"	Bharadwaj	K. Kalyan	Rashmi	
2006	Suntaragaali	"Ene Madona"	Sadhu Kokila	Ranganath	Malathy Lakshman	
2006	Ramya Chaitrakala	"Bhalle Bhalle"	S. Shyam Sundar	Doddarange Gowda	Sangeetha Katti	
2006	Hetthavara Kanasu	"Modale Chaligaala" "Sridevi Lakshmi"	Vandemataram Srinivas	K. Kalyan	Lakshmi	
2006	Ashoka	"Manasello Ello" "Thai Thai Bangari"	Sadhu Kokila	K. Kalyan	Nanditha; Chaithra H. G.	
2006	Thandege Thakka Maga	"Jaajiya Hoo Chanda" "Savaalaaku"	S. A. Rajkumar	V. Nagendra Prasad; Kaviraj	K. S. Chithra	
2006	Shubham	"Ee Dhamani Dhamani" "Ee Mounava"	Gurukiran	V. Nagendra Prasad; K. Kalyan	K. S. Chithra	
2006	Ambi	"Hey Hrudaya" "Manasige Manasige"	V. Nagendra Prasad	V. Nagendra Prasad	Chaithra H. G.	
2006	Belli Betta	"Guruvillade"	A. T. Raveesh	Shivamurthy	Nanditha	
2006	Honeymoon Express	"Chikka Chikka Manasugalu"	R. P. Patnaik	Ram Narayan	Maalavika	
2006	Thirupathi	"Lakha Lakha Huduga"	Rajesh Ramanath	Kaviraj	Sunitha	
2006	Jackpot	"Sakha Sakha"	Hameed	Ram Narayan	Lakshmi Manmohan	
2006	Neenello Naanalle	"Nooraru Hrudayagalu" "Onti Hakki" "Aakasha Bhoomiya"	Ramesh Krishna	Kaviraj	Sumangali; Hemanth	
2006	Odahuttidavalu	"Baaro Baaro Maava"	R. P. Patnaik	Ram Narayan	K. S. Chithra	
2006	Mahanagara	"O Mugile"	Naga-Mahesh	Muniswamy		
2006	Jothe Jotheyali	"Soorya Kannu Hodeda"	V. Harikrishna	V. Nagendra Prasad		
2006	Autograph Please	"Hrudaya Mathaduva" "Kannigu Kannerigu" "Sariye"	Arjun Janya	K. Kalyan; Kaviraj	Nanditha	
2006	Thangigagi	"Onde Ondu"	Sadhu Kokila	A. P. Arjun	Anuradha Sriram	
2006	Hubballi	"Pallakki Myala"	A. R. Hemanth	Padma Hemanth	Sripriya	
2006	Student	"Mellane Mellane"	R. P. Patnaik	Kaviraj	Sumangali	
2006	Care of Footpath	"Saadhane Saadhane"	Ravi Dattathreya	Hrudaya Shiva		
2006	Madana	"Onde Balli"	Yuvan Shankar Raja	V. Manohar	Chethan Sosca	
2006	Nage Habba	"Nage Habba" "Ninnandake Vayyarake" "Neeranu Tharisona" "Shoki"	Adarsha	Adarsha	Chaithra H. G. Shamitha Malnad	
2006	Kallarali Hoovagi	"Ninna Nenapinali" "Alimola Alimola"	Hamsalekha	Hamsalekha	K. S. Chithra	
2006	Geeya Geeya	"Anandada Samaya" "Cheluva Chandana" "Naa Haado"	Bhavatharini	Ram Narayan; Bhashya Ghulam	Nanditha	
2007	Ee Rajeev Gandhi Alla	"Huduga Huduga"	Sadhu Kokila	Kaviraj	Malathy Lakshman	
2007	Sneha Parva	"Brahmana"	Leo	V. Nagendra Prasad	Nanditha	
2007	Thangiya Mane	"Manasemba Banalli" "Jeevanavu Jothe"	Raju Upendra	Shree Chandru	Nanditha	
2007	Duniya	"Kariya I Love You"	V. Manohar	V. Nagendra Prasad	Nanditha	
2007	Parodi	"Huttiruva Mannige"	Rajesh Ramanath	Su Rudramurthy Sastry	K. S. Chithra	
2007	VIP 5	"O Priyathama"	Rajesh Ramanath	Sree Chandru	Nanditha	
2007	Ondu Preethiya Kathe	"Nooru Janmaku" "Preethi Shuru"	Gandharva	Rajashekar Rao; Gandharva	K. S. Chithra	
2007	Rakshaka	"Entha Chandavo" "Ee Jeeva Nondide"	K. V. Ravichandra	K. V. Ravichandra		
2007	Lancha Samrajya	"Baa Nanna Priye"	Raju Upendra	Keshavadithya	Nanditha	
2007	Bhaktha	"Modagalache Swarga" "Novallu Loveide" "Jaga Beda"	Abhiman Roy	Raghu; Sriram		
2007	Janapada	"Hejje Itta Kade"	Hamsalekha	Baraguru Ramachandrappa	Nanditha	
2007	Pallakki	"Bidu Bidu Kaddu Nododanna"	Gurukiran	Hrudaya Shiva	Chaithra H. G.	
2007	Dushman	"Thangaliyadudu"	S. P. Chandrakanth	T. S. Bagalakote		
2007	Kshana Kshana	"I Love You"	R. P. Patnaik	K. Kalyan	Shreya Ghoshal	
2007	No 73, Shanthi Nivasa	"Preethi Endare" "Thayatha Thayatha" "Adadella Olledaythu"	Bharadwaj	K. Kalyan	Kalyani; Archana Udupa, L. N. Shastry, Nanditha, Arun Sagar, Master Hirannayya	
2007	Jambada Hudugi	"Nodi Nodi Ninna"	Rajesh Ramanath	Sree Chandru		
2007	Ugadi	"Enayitho Nanna Olage" "So Much to Say" "Preethisuve Ninna" "Diri Diri"	R. P. Patnaik	K. Kalyan	Nanditha; K. S. Chithra	
2007	Snehana Preethina	"Sakku Sakku Sakku"	V. Harikrishna	V. Nagendra Prasad	Hemanth, Chaithra H. G.	
2007	Meera Madhava Raghava	"Vasantha Vasantha"	Hamsalekha	Hamsalekha	Anuradha Bhat	
2007	Savi Savi Nenapu	"Sooryanu Ee Divasa"	R. P. Patnaik	Jayanth Kaikini	Sunitha Upadrashta	
2007	Maathaad Maathaadu Mallige	"Baaro Nam Therige"	Mano Murthy	Nagathihalli Chandrashekar	Nanditha, B. Jayashree	
2007	Gandana Mane	"Oho Gandana Mane"	V. Manohar	S. Mahendar		
2007	Ninade Nenapu	"Naana Kane" "Heegeke Nanninda"	Aadhi; Ram Sampath	Manjunath Rao		
2007	Jeevana Dhaare	"Kannadiga Kannadiga" "Naanu Ninagagi Bande"	Raju Upendra	Muniraj Boodigere	Nanditha	
2007	Milana	"Madarangiyalli"	Mano Murthy	Jayanth Kaikini	Shreya Ghoshal	
2007	Road Romeo	"Kuhu Kuhu Kogile"	K. M. Indra	K. M. Indra	Shreya Ghoshal	
2007	Guna	"Yaaro Ariyenu"	Vijayanand	Kaviraj	Vidya	
2007	Agrahara	"Amma"	Vinay	Gururaj Hosakote		
2007	Circle Rowdy	"Yaarivalu" "Nanna Kanasellavu" "Chali Chali" "Saniya Saniya"	M. N. Krupakar	V. Nagendra Prasad	Nanditha	
2007	Shukra	"Hani Haniyo"	Gautham	Goturi	Sriraksha Aravind	
2007	Geleya	"Nanna Styleu Berene"	Mano Murthy	Kaviraj	Inchara	
2007	Snehanjali	"I AM in Love" "Preethiya Savinenapali"	Rajesh Ramanath	V. Nagendra Prasad; Girish Kamplapura	Lakshmi	
2007	Ganesha	"Belli Chukki" "Chakora Chakora"	Manikanth Kadri	Raghu Urdigar; Kaviraj	Ujjainee Roy	
2007	Orata I Love You	"Ene Ene" "Saddu Saddu" "Yaaro Kannalli"	G. R. Shankar	K. Kalyan	K. S. Chithra; Nanditha	
2007	Gunavantha	"Oppisu" "Kolle Nanna" "Nanmele Kopa Yake"	Hamsalekha	Hamsalekha	K. S. Chithra; Anuradha Bhat	
2007	Naanu Neenu Jodi	"Kagadada Doni" "Preethisalu Dhairya"	Hamsalekha	Hamsalekha	K. S. Chithra; Sunidhi Chauhan	
2007	Ee Bandhana	"Lets Dance"	Mano Murthy	Kaviraj	Chaithra H. G.	
2007	Ee Preethi Yeke Bhoomi Melide	"Kallanivanu"	R. P. Patnaik	V. Nagendra Prasad	Nithyashree Mahadevan	
2008	Honganasu	"Kunwari Kunwari"	Hamsalekha	Hamsalekha		
2008	Navashakthi Vaibhava	"Amma Endare"	Hamsalekha	Hamsalekha		
2008	Yuga Yugagale Saagali	"Nange Neenu"	Hamsalekha	Hamsalekha	K. S. Chithra	
2008	Hani Hani	"Hani Hani" "Malli Malli"	S. Chinna	Ram Narayan; Ullavi Prasad		
2008	Hogi Baa Magale	"Olagolage Agoithu" "Thank you So Much"	L. N. Shastry	Sree Chandru	Suma Shastry	
2008	Inthi Ninna Preethiya	"Ondonde Bachhitta Maathu" "Endu Endu Mugisada"	Sadhu Kokila	Yogaraj Bhat	Raksha Aravind	
2008	Manasugula Mathu Madhura	"Preethiyalli Eno Ide" "Goodu Bitta Hakkige" "Ninna Kannige Ondu"	K. Kalyan	K. Kalyan	Aishwarya Kalyan; Divya Raghavan; Sinchan Dixith	
2008	Gooli	"Gooli" "Kaddu Kaddu"	Anoop Seelin	P. Sathya	K. S. Chithra	
2008	Sathya In Love	"Romanchana"	Gurukiran	Kaviraj	Sicily	
2008	Happy New Year	"Neenenaa Neenenaa"	A. T. Raveesh	Sridhar-Shankar	Priyadarshini	
2008	Aramane	"Nagu Nagu"	Gurukiran	Kaviraj		
2008	Gange Baare Thunge Baare	"Onde Ondu Saari"	Sadhu Kokila	Ranganath		
2008	Aathmeeya	"Aralisu Baa Bega"	Manoj George	Ranga	Chinmayi	
2008	Neene Neene	"Yenu Idu Yenu"	Srimurali	Kaviraj	Nanditha	
2008	Channa	"Nannusirina Vedane" "Chenna Chenna"	Venkat-Narayan	Thangali Nagaraj	Chaithra H. G.	
2008	Huttidare Kannada Nadali Huttabeku	"Malayali Malayali"	K. M. Indra	K. M. Indra	Priya	
2008	Nee Tata Naa Birla	"Mutthu Kodala"	Gurukiran	Hrudaya Shiva	Chaithra H. G.	
2008	Taj Mahal	"Nee Nanna Manasinali"	Abhiman Roy	Abhiman Roy		
2008	Bombaat	"Strawberry Kenneya"	Mano Murthy	Kaviraj	Supriya Ramakrishanaiah	
2008	Anthu Inthu Preethi Banthu	"Mandara Mandara"	Yuvan Shankar Raja	Hrudaya Shiva		
2008	Kodagana Koli Nungitha	"Ee Ringina Nota"	Sadhu Kokila	Ram Narayan	Anuradha Sriram	
2008	Ganesha Matthe Banda	"Bangalore Nande"	V. Manohar	Kaviraj		
2008	Patre Loves Padma	"Hey Hudugi"	Arjun Janya	Chandrashekar Srivasthav	Nanditha	
2008	Vamshi	"Amalu Amalu"	R. P. Patnaik	Jayanth Kaikini	Harini Sudhakar	
2008	PUC	"Summane Summane"	T. Raviraj	Kaviraj	Nanditha	
2008	Chikkamagaloora Chikka Mallige	"Nee Bareda Premageethe"	K. Kalyan	K. Kalyan		
2008	Baa Bega Chandamama	"Sangaathi Naa Ninna" "Iniyane Baaro"	H. G. Murali	Anand Ram; V. Nagendra Prasad	Anuradha Bhat; Nanditha	
2008	Sangathi	"Pada Bidisuva" "Nodidashtu Chenda"	Hamsalekha	Hamsalekha	K. S. Chithra	
2008	Slum Bala	"Ale Aleyo"	Arjun Janya	Sumana Kittur	Nanditha	
2008	Maharshi	"Saisiya"	Sree Murali	Kaviraj	Apoorva Sridhar	
2008	Akka Thangi	"Tuvvi Tuvvi"	V. Manohar	Kaviraj	Nanditha	
2008	Janumada Gelathi	"Hrudaya Mugulu Nagalu"	V. Manohar	Yogaraj Bhat	Nanditha	
2009	Nanda	"Aakasa Aagale"	V. Manohar	Jayanth Kaikini	Nanditha	
2009	Yodha	"Mangalyam Tanthunaanena"	Hamsalekha	Hamsalekha	Nanditha	
2009	KA-99 B-333	"Kuhoo Kuhoo"	Sangeet Raj	Sriharsha	Nanditha	
2009	Ee Sambhashane	"Thangali Aramanege"	V. Manohar	V. Manohar		
2009	Swathantra Palya	"Vidhiye"	M. N. Krupakar	Mohan		
2009	Baaji	"Kenneya Mele"	G. R. Shankar	Hrudaya Shiva		
2009	Hrudayagala Vishaya	"Ok Ella Ok"	Drums Deva	V. Manohar	Anuradha Bhat	
2009	Nishedhagne	"Eko Kaane Manasella"	M. S. Giridhar	Hrudaya Shiva	Vasudha	
2009	Uda	"Udugoreyagi"	Bharanishree	Bharanishree		
2009	Machcha	"Yaaro Preethi Thanda"	Arjun Janya	Malavalli Saikrishna	K. S. Chithra	
2009	Abhimani	"Nannusiru Nannusiru"	Dharma Theja	Govindegowda		
2009	Kalakar	"Manase Yaavaragadalli"	Giridhar Diwan	V. Manohar	Mangala	
2009	Nannedeya Haadu	"Heegeko Kaane" "Usiru Hogo"	A. T. Raveesh	Venugopal; Guruvendra	Priyadarshini	
2009	Olave Jeevana Lekkachaara	"Nanna Preethiya Geleya"	Mano Murthy	Nagathihalli Chandrashekar	Shreya Ghoshal	
2009	Kencha	"Ommomme Ommomme" "Thumbane Thumbane"	Rajesh Ramanath	Kaviraj	Akanksha Badami; Nanditha	
2009	Muniya	"O Chandamama"	Abhimann Roy	Jhamakandi Shivu	Shreya Ghoshal	
2009	Vayuputra	"Yaare Yaare Yaramma"	V. Harikrishna	V. Nagendra Prasad		
2009	Abhay	"Yammo Mayammo"	V. Harikrishna	V. Nagendra Prasad		
2009	Gilli	"Nenedu Nenedu Nodu"	Yuvan Shankar Raja	Ram Narayan		
2009	Devaru Kotta Thangi	"Obba Thangi Maado Habba"	Hamsalekha	Hamsalekha	K. S. Chithra	
2009	Nirudyogi	"Thane Thane"	A. T. Raveesh	Kaviraj	Priyadarshini	
2009	Ravana	"Thampu Thampu" "Jooba Jooba"	Abhimann Roy	K. Kalyan; Kaviraj		
2009	Kallara Santhe	"Kallara Katheya" "Maribeku" "Kaledu Hoda" "Thutthoori"	V. Manohar	V. Manohar; G. P. Rajarathnam	Shamitha Malnad; Nanditha	

=== 2010–2019 ===
Year	Film	Song(s)	Music composer	Lyricist	Co-singer(s)	Notes
2010	Police Quarters	"Aaha Oho Nakshatra" "Bhanu Bhoomi Serida"	James Vasanthan	V. Manohar; K. M. Gangadharappa	Venkat Sham Sundar; Hari Priya	
2010	Just Maath Maathalli	"Marubhoomiyalli"	Raghu Dixit	Manojava Galgali		
2010	Yaare Nee Devathe	"Nayana Nayana"	Venkat-Narayan	Panchajanya	Apoorva Sridhar	
2010	Crazy Kutumba	"Hendathiyobbalu" "Naanagiddare Shrimantha" "Nee Badaladare"	Ricky Kej	K. S. Narasimhaswamy; Jayanth Kaikini	B. Jayashree, M. D. Pallavi, Avinash Chebbi, Badri Prasad	
2010	Aptharakshaka	"Rakshaka Aptharakshaka"	Gurukiran	V. Manohar	SPB, Nanditha	
2010	Jugaari	"Ninna Nanu Nodovaregu"	Arjun Janya	K. S. Narayana Swamy	K. S. Chithra	
2010	Janani	"Nannasege Usiru" "Preethiye Nanage"	Asif Ali	Mohan Shankar; K. Kalyan	K. S. Surekha	
2010	Sihigaali	"Brahma Kalisida Daiva"	G. R. Shankar	V. Nagendra Prasad	Sunitha Sanje	
2010	Sri Harikathe	"Summane Ninnanu"	Sameer Kulkarni	Yogaraj Bhat	Sumanth	
2010	Dildara	"Kadibyada Kano"	Praveen D. Rao	V. Nagendra Prasad	Snehaja Praveen	
2010	Swayamvara	"Shuruvaayitu"	Manikanth Kadri	Tushar Ranganath		
2010	Premism	"Premism Premism"	Hamsalekha	Hamsalekha	Shreya Ghoshal	
2010	Krishna Nee Late Aagi Baaro	"Bandano Banda" "Yaar Yaarigu"	Pravin Godkhindi	Mohan Shankar	Ananya Bhat; Supriya Acharya	
2010	Parole	"Jaaduvagi Manasalli"	Balaji K. Mithran	S. Bahubali	Shweta Mohan	
2010	Prithvi	"Kukkoo Kogileyinda"	Manikanth Kadri	K. Kalyan	Sunidhi Chauhan	
2010	Antharathma	"Eegeega Nannali"	Giridhar Diwan	Aarya	Mangala	
2010	Preethiyinda Ramesh	"Something Something"	A. T. Raveesh	K. Kalyan	Priyadarshini	
2010	Nooru Janmaku	"Nooru Janmaku"	Mano Murthy	Nagathihalli Chandrashekar		
2010	Khadak	"Nodi Nodi Nodadanthe" "Kanna Muchhi"	S. P. Chandrakanth	Ram Narayan; Shyam Shimoga	Chaithra H. G.	
2010	Krishnan Love Story	"Nee Aadada Maathu"	Sridhar V. Sambhram	Jayanth Kaikini		
2010	Preethi Andre Ishtena	"Malle Hoove"	A. T. Raveesh	A. T. Raveesh		
2010	Rowdy Hrudaya	"Kannanchali"	Ravishankar	M. Shivakumar	K. S. Chithra	
2010	Lift Kodla	"Ondu Maathu" "Suriva Maleyali"	V. Manohar	Ram Narayan; V. Manohar	Anuradha Bhat	
2010	Meshtru	"Sonne Andre"	K. M. Indra	K. M. Indra		
2010	Shambo Shankara	"Mandara Neene"	M. S. Maruthi	Mohan Shankar	Nanditha	
2010	Jokaali	"Bhoomi Mele" "Olagolage"	S. A. Rajkumar	Ram Narayan	Supriya Ramakrishnaiah; Shamitha Malnad	
2010	Preethi Hangama	"Manasu Manasugalige"	Raj Kiran	Kaviraj		
2010	Kari Chirathe	"Shivane Shivane"	Sadhu Kokila	Tushar Ranganath		
2010	Appu and Pappu	"Hey Appu"	Hamsalekha	Hamsalekha	Anuradha Sriram	
2010	Vichitra Premi	"Mungaru Mungaru" "Mathaade Mathaade"	Gandharva	Kurudi Banakara	Nanditha	
2010	Naariya Seere Kadda	"Najooku Najooku" "Kole Kole"	V. Manohar	V. Manohar	Vijaya Shankar; Anuradha Bhat	
2010	Modalasala	"Modalasala"	V. Harikrishna	V. Nagendra Prasad		
2011	Olave Mandara	"Olave Mandaravayithu" "Chinna Ninna Bali"	Deva	K. Kalyan	Nanditha; Shreya Ghoshal	
2011	Ee Sanje	"Bittyaakode"	Jai Shiva	Sree		
2011	Manasina Maathu	"Helalu Bande"	A. M. Neel	R. Anantharaju		
2011	Kalgejje	"Panchama Veda"	Gandharva	A. Bangaru	Anuradha Bhat	
2011	Veerabahu	"Neenello"	V. Harikrishna	V. Nagendra Prasad	Srivardhini	
2011	Karthik	"Jigi Jigi Jinkemari"	John Varki	Hrudaya Shiva		
2011	Gun	"Kusumada Baana"	Ronnie Raphael	Jayanth Kaikini		
2011	Saacha	"Innu Saniha"	Parameshwar Hegde	Jayanth Kaikini	Vasundhara Das	
2011	Ellellu Neene Nannallu Neene	"Haayagi Balendu" "Midiyada Manasu"	Vijaya Bharathi	Kaviraj; Jayanth Kaikini	Charumathi; Chaithra H. G.	
2011	Murali Meets Meera	"Ninna Mukha Nodi"	Abhimann Roy	Ghouse Peer		
2011	Dhool	"Eduru Mane Meenakshi"	V. Harikrishna	V. Nagendra Prasad		
2011	Mallikarjuna	"Pallakki Haaduva"	S. A. Rajkumar	Hrudaya Shiva	Anuradha Sriram	
2011	Noorondu Baagilu	"Banella Kendaavare"	V. Manohar	V. Manohar	Suma Shastry	
2011	Namitha I Love You	"Andava Anandavaa"	M. Jayasimha Reddy	M. Jayasimha Reddy		
2011	Jolly Boy	"Baa Endare" "Kallu Kooda Kavithe"	Yuvan Shankar Raja	K. Kalyan		
2011	Shrimathi	"Preethse Preethse"	Ghantadi Krishna	Shivananje Gowda	Nanditha	
2011	Krishnan Marriage Story	"Parijathada"	Sridhar V. Sambhram	Jayanth Kaikini	Lakshmi Manmohan	
2011	Mr. Duplicate	"Haage Summane"	Manikanth Kadri	Dwarki Raghav	Ritisha Padmanabhan	
2011	90	"90 90 90"	Sadhu Kokila	Mathews Manu	Chinnaponnu	
2011	Lifeu Ishtene	"Kanasina Hosaputa"	Mano Murthy	Jayanth Kaikini		
2011	Allide Nammane Illi Bande Summane	"Thuru Thuru Tunturu"	Gurukiran	Kaviraj	Manjari	
2011	Maryade Ramanna	"Namma Kannadathi"	M. M. Keeravani	K. Kalyan	Soujanya Mallesh	
2011	Naanalla	"O Manase Uliyali"	Giridhar Diwan	Ram Narayan		
2011	Ishta	"Nee Ishta Ne" "Kaathurada"	M. Sanjeev	M. Sanjeev	Anuradha Bhat	
2011	Aacharya	"I Love You Ennalare" "Hrudayadi Preethiya"	R. Ananth Kumar	Shashank	Lakshmi Manmohan; Divya Raghavan	
2011	Paagal	"Nee Nanna Yedeyolage"	V. Manohar	Gangadhar		
2011	Vishnu	"Hoo Manase"	M. N. Krupakar	Chandru	Soujanya Mallesh	
2011	Onde Ondu Saari	"Nannanegu"	M. Rajesh	Saleem Puttur	Anuradha Bhat	
2011	Hero Naanalla	"Neenandre Ishta Kano"	K. M. Indra	K. M. Indra		
2012	Parijatha	"Hudugee"	Mano Murthy	Jayanth Kaikini		
2012	Nammanna Don	"Ee Jeeva Ninagagi"	Mathews Manu	Shankar		
2012	Gavipura	"Oho Eni"	Rajesh Ramanath	V. Manohar	Nanditha	
2012	Sankranthi	"Nenape Nenapayithu"	Sridhar V. Sambhram	K. Kalyan		
2012	Magadi	"Preethi Mohaka"	Rajesh Ramanath	Channaveera	Anuradha Bhat	
2012	Govindaya Namaha	"Ninnidane"	Gurukiran	Santhosh Nayak		
2012	Breaking News	"Sambhanda"	Stephen Prayog	Nagathihalli Chandrashekar	Anuradha Bhat	
2012	Villain	"Kannalle Sambhashane"	Gurukiran	Jayanth Kaikini	Anuradha Bhat	
2012	Crazy Loka	"Ele Elege Chiguruva"	Manikanth Kadri	Kaviraj	Aishwarya Majumdar	
2012	Bhagirathi	"Henne Henne"	V. Manohar	Baraguru Ramachandrappa	Anuradha Bhat	
2012	Paper Doni	"Irabahuda Nee" "Helalu Aagadu"	Srisuman	Sri Chandru	Pooja Basu Thakur; K. S. Chithra	
2012	Hai Krishna	"Romanchana"	A. T. Raveesh	Ram Narayan	Sicily	
2012	Preethiya Loka	"Preethiya Loka"	Sai Kiran	Ravishankar Nag	Anuradha Bhat	
2012	Sagar	"Ondu Early Morning" "Weekendu"	Gurukiran	Kaviraj	Shamitha Malnad	
2012	Jai Hind	"Chimmi Chimmi"	Krishnavardhan Kulkarni	Krishnavardhan Kulkarni	Anupama M. A.	
2012	Gokula Krishna	"Neene Neene"	S. A. Rajkumar	V. Nagendra Prasad		
2012	Krantiveera Sangolli Rayanna	"Gandu Mettida Naadu" "Janani Janmabhoomi"	Yashovardhan	Keshavadithya	Shankar Mahadevan, Hemanth, Nanditha, Prakash Sontakke	
2012	Guru	"Enu Papa Madide"	Vinay Chandra	Kaviraj		
2012	Olavina Ole	"Olavina Oleya"	Yashovardhan	Teshee Venkatesh		
2012	Hosa Prema Purana	"Ninnondige"	Rajesh Ramanath	Jayanth Kaikini	Akanksha Badami	
2012	Nandeesha	"Baalu Bandre"	Hamsalekha	Hamsalekha	Chaithra H. G.	
2013	CID Eesha	"Kuhoo Kuhoo Kogile" "Ivanu Yaaru"	Vijaya Bharathi	Ram Narayan; V. Manohar	Nanditha	
2013	Nenapinangala	"Heegeke Noduve" "Ondondu Muthina" "Ee Putta Hrudayada"	C. R. Bobby	Dhanuchandra Mavinakunte	Lakshmi Nataraj	
2013	Kumbha Rashi	"Aaha Sihi"	Srivatsa	Arasu Anthare	Anuradha Bhat	
2013	Pagade	"Malebille Nanage"	Sagar Nagabhushan	Ram Narayan	Shamitha Malnad	
2013	Director's Special	"Devare Aagadha"	Anoop Seelin	B. R. Lakshman Rao		
2013	Googly	"Bisilu Kudure Ondhu"	Joshua Sridhar	Yogaraj Bhat		
2013	I am in Love	"Kadala Mele"	Sai Karthik	Nanda Kumar		
2013	Neralu	"Helale Nanna" "Ninna Parichaya"	Sri Harsha	Sridhar	Supriya; Anuradha Bhat	
2013	Nanda Gokula	"Manasu Meerali" "Yaaro Yaaro"	Madan Mohan	Narasimha M. Joshi	Anuradha Bhat; Nanditha	
2013	Shathru	"Maya Maya"	Sujeet Shetty	Shivu Jhamkandi	Nanditha	
2013	Pyarge Aagbittaithe	"Enidu Maaye"	Dharma Teja	Ram Narayan	Anuradha Bhat	
2013	Dhanu	"Hetthu Hotthu"	B. R. Hemanth Kumar	Maadev		
2013	Slum	"Belli Belli"	B. R. Hemanth Kumar	Revanna Nayak	Archana Ravi	
2013	Jeethu	"Nanna Jeeva"	Vikas Vasishta	Appu Kushal	Ritisha Padmanabhan	
2013	Mugila Chumbana	"Chinni Chintamani" "Belake Hombelake" "Premaraga Thappidaga" "Sangeetha I Love You" "Yaare Nee Muddu" "Prema Pallakki"	Vijayanand	S. Narayan; R. N. Jayagopal	Manjula Gururaj; Sowmya	
2014	Karnataka Ayodhyapuram	"Marubhoomi Edeyali"	Sagar Nagabhushan	Ram Narayan		
2014	Navarangi	"Ale Ale"	Rajesh Ramanath	Naveen	Nanditha	
2014	Vasundhara	"Kanasella Eega"	Stephen Prayog	Vasuki Vaibhav	Archana Ravi, Stephen Prayog	
2014	Anjada Gandu	"Hogele"	D. Imman	K. Kalyan		
2014	Crazy Star	"Kenakalu Inukalu"	V. Ravichandran	V. Ravichandran	Anuradha Bhat	
2014	Nan Life Alli	"Maathillada Ee Mouna"	B. Ajaneesh Lokanath	Ramdeep, Lokesh		
2014	Karoodpathi	"Namma Maneya"	Abhimann Roy	K. Kalyan	Inchara Nagesh	
2014	Savaal	"Premada Mathina"	V. Manohar	V. Manohar		
2014	Manada Mareyalli	"Premadakarshane"	M. S. Thyagaraj	Surya Narayan	Anuradha Bhat	
2014	Athi Aparoopa	"Amma Ninna"	Mano Murthy	K. Kalyan	Anuradha Bhat	
2014	Malli	"Nannaane Nanage" "Karanavirade Neenu" "Naari Andate"	C. R. Bobby	Hrudaya Shiva; V. Nagendra Prasad	Shamitha Malnad	
2014	Aakramana	"Vinimaya"	Sathish Aryan	Sathish Aryan		
2014	Bahuparak	"Usiraguve"	Bharath BJ	Simple Suni	Anuradha Bhat	
2014	Panganama	"Nooru Koli"	Adithya Pandit	Guru	Anuradha Bhat	
2014	Paramashiva	"Hege Na Bande" "Hannagabeku Kaayi" "Rajakumari"	Arjun Janya	V. Nagendra Prasad	Chinmayi; Sainthavi; Akanksha Badami	
2014	Neenade Naa	"Joru Joru"	Arjun Janya	K. Kalyan	Archana Ravi	
2014	Namaste Madam	"Ding Dong Bell"	Sridhar V. Sambhram	V. Nagendra Prasad	Supriya Lohith	
2014	Ee Dil Helide Nee Bekantha	"Hennu Ninnadaythu"	S. Sridhara	S. Sridhara	Sneha	
2014	Abhimanyu	"Kathala Maneyolage"	Arjun Janya	V. Nagendra Prasad	L. N. Shastry	
2014	Love in Mandya	"Ondu Aparoopada"	Anoop Seelin	Arasu Anthare	K. S. Chithra	
2014	Software Ganda	"Saniha Saniha" "Pyategintha"	Veer Samarth	Hrudaya Shiva	Lakshmi Nataraj; Shamitha Malnad	
2014	Pyar Ka Gol Gumbaz	"O Chayhe"	Dhanush	Dhanush		
2014	Chirayu	"Sanchalana"	G. R. Shankar	K. Kalyan		
2014	Sorry Kane	"O Sagari"	Peter M Joseph	Manjunath Rao	Anuradha Bhat	
2014	Mr. and Mrs. Ramachari	"Kaarmoda Saridu"	V. Harikrishna	Ghouse Peer		Winner - SIIMA award for Best Playback Singer
2014	Jothi Alias Kothiraj	"Yaako Eno"	Seven Star Bhaskar	Doddarange Gowda	Priya Yadav	
2015	Mirchi Mandakki Khadak Chai	"Haage Bandu"	Harikavya	K. Kalyan	K. S. Chithra	
2015	Ond Chance Kodi	"Agumbe Sanjeya" "Enee Munjaane"	Mysore Mohan	Kaviraj	Anuradha Bhat	
2015	DK	"Sum Sumne"	Arjun Janya	Sudarshan	Anuradha Bhat	
2015	Benkipatna	"Bogaseyalli Male"	Steve Koushik	Jayanth Kaikini	Anuradha Bhat	
2015	Rudra Tandava	"Yaaree Yaaree"	V. Harikrishna	K. Kalyan		Winner - KIMA award
2015	Melody	"Nannolage" "Iddaroo Ondu Ooralli" "Preethi Kithabu" "Gundu Olagodre"	L. N. Shastry	V. Nagendra Prasad	Priya Himesh; L. N. Shastry	Also acted in the lead role
2015	Eradondla Mooru	"Aagale Thadavagide"	A. M. Neel	Kumar Datth		
2015	Murari	"Aana Jaana Gaana" "Edeyolage Hrudayave"	V. Manohar	V. Manohar	Nanditha	
2015	Sharanam Sharanam Ayyappa (album)	"Pavanavu Nithyavu" "Irumudi Ondu" "Banna Bannada Ookuliya" "Mooru Lokada Hey Odeya" "Mangala Jyothiya "Hey Dharamashasta" "Sharanam Sharanam Ennri"	Rajesh Ramanath	Gajendra		
2015	Goolihatti	"Madhu Mounada"	Srimanju	K. Kalyan	Anuradha Bhat	
2015	Preethiyinda	"Aamantrana Needuve"	Rajesh Ramanath	Vishwaradhya		
2015	Muddu Manase	"Edeyal Yaro"	Vineeth Raj Menon	V. Nagendra Prasad	Archana Ravi	
2015	Billa	"Ninnegale Nenapirali" "Enaitho Kaane"	Sriram	Dwarki Raghav	Chaithra H. G.	
2015	Geetha Bangle Store	"En Sambhavam"	V. Manohar	V. Manohar		
2015	Bettanagere	"Neeli Neeli Kanna"	Rajesh Ramanath	V. Nagendra Prasad	Anuradha Bhat	
2015	Kaada Haadiya Hoogalu	"Kuniyuva Navilina"	Dr L. R. Ramanujam	Ka. Vem. Srinivasamurthy		
2015	Rathaavara	"Nee Muddada"	Dharma Vish	Kaviraj	Supriya Lohith	
2015	Om Sharanam Ayyappa	"Om Sharanam"	K. Sharath	K. Kalyan		
2016	Ricky	"Jeeva Neenu"	Arjun Janya	K. Kalyan		
2016	Bhagyaraj	"Ninnaya Sangada"	Anoop Seelin	Jayanth Kaikini		
2016	Shivayogi Sri Puttayyajja	"Nee Enage" "Bhoomigintha Neenu" "Naana Embudu" "Enu Ninna Leeleyo" "Akaara Ukaara Makaara"	Amarapriya	Pandit Puttaraj Gawai; Amarapriya; Shishunala Sharif; Shankarananda Swamiji	Ajay Warior	
2016	Preethiyalli Sahaja	"Ee Olavu" "Sahaja Sahaja"	Raviraj	Rathnaja		
2016	Preethi Kithabu	"Thavaka Thaleno"	V. Manohar	V. Manohar	Anuradha Bhat	
2016	Chiravada Nenapu	"Chiravada Nenapu"	A. Praveen Oliver	Chethan S. P.		
2016	Simpallag Innondh Love Story	"Naane Bareda Nanna Kathege"	Sai Kiran	Simple Suni	Anuradha Bhat	
2016	Kollegala	"Yaaro Ivalu"	A. T. Raveesh	Naveen Rai		
2016	Sri Chakram	"Nalini"	Prabhu S. R.	GG	Prabhu S. R.	
2016	Siganduru Chowdeshwari Mahime	"Suralokadinda" "Karuneya Kannanu"	L. N. Shastry	Shashikumar P. M.	Anuradha Bhat	
2016	Style King	"Ala Le Sukumaari"	Arjun Janya	Kaviraj	Archana Ravi	
2016	Birth	"O Vidhiye" "Pisu Gali"	G. R. Shankar	Shivu Holalu	Nimika Ratnakar	
2016	Mandya Star	"Avva Endodane" "Star"	Manoj. S	Vinod; Ramakrishna Ranaganti	Manoj. S	
2016	Akshathe	"Ondondu Nenapindu"	V. Manohar	V. Manohar	Anuradha Bhat	
2016	Asthitva	"Nenapugale Moodive"	Vijay Antony	V. Nagendra Prasad		
2016	Crazy Boy	"Mugiligu Kadlaligu"	Jassie Gift	Ghouse Peer		
2016	Rasapuri	"Usire Nintha Mele" "Innadaru Naguthiru"	Jithendra Karkala	A. M. Daivajnya		
2016	Jil Jil	"Preethi Preethi"	A. Madhu	A. Madhu		
2016	Prema Geema Jaane Do	"Aparoopadananda"	Poornachandra Tejaswi	Arasu Anthare		
2016	Yuva Samrat	"Preethi Andare" "Ninagu Munche"	Yashwanth Kumar	Ghouse Peer; Kaviraj	Supriya Lohith	
2016	One Time	"Sangathi Sangathi" "Ethake Kayiside"	Abhiman Roy	Raju B. N. Abhiman Roy	Supriya Lohith; Thanusha Srinidhi	
2016	A Happy Married Life	"Maduveya"	C. J. Anil	Anand Vatar		
2017	Arivu	"Aa Ee Kaliyuva"	Navaneeth	Sosale Gangadhar		
2017	Riktha	"Bari Kannale"	Rocky Sonu	Rocky Sonu		
2017	Allama	"Sri Guruve Enage" "Bayalu Bayalane" "Kaana Barada Lingavu"	Bapu Padmanabha	Traditional; Allama Prabhu	None	
2017	Style Raja	"Manase Manase"	Rajesh Ramanath	N. B. Lokesh	Anuradha Bhat	
2017	Hebbuli	"Yennenu Soda"	Arjun Janya	Santhosh Naik	Vijay Prakash	
2017	Eradu Kanasu	"Nooru Kampana"	Steve - Kaushik	Jayanth Kaikini	Anuradha Bhat	
2017	Porki Huccha Venkat	"Kannugale" "Kopa Bandre" "Thayiya Halu" "Huccha Venkat Nanu"	Sathish Babu	Huccha Venkat		
2017	Pokari Raja	"Somp Sompada Prema"	K. M. Indra	K. Shankar	Anuradha Bhat, Poojitha Pai	
2017	BB5	"Putta Putta"	Chethan Kumar Shastry	Janardhan N		
2017	Jinda	"Maadeshanaane Muddu"	Sridhar V Sambhram	V. Nagendra Prasad		
2017	Yugapurusha	"Nerale Nerale"	Dhanpal Singh Rajput	Kaviraj	Nanditha	
2017	Nammoor Haiklu	"Parijaatha Haari"	Shakeel Ahmed	Prasanna Shetty	Anuradha Bhat	
2017	Nanobne Ollevnu	"Ukkina Koteya" "Attha Nodu"	Sudheer Shastry	Vijay Mahesh		
2017	First Love	"Nelasama Nelasama"	Sridhar V. Sambhram	Ghouse Peer		
2017	Paaru I Love You	"Jotheyaagiru" "Sihiyaagi Savide"	A. T. Raveesh	Suneel Hubbli	Nanditha	
2017	Happy Journey	"Hoogala Rashi" "Baduku Nirashe"	S. P. Chandrakanth	Shyam Shimogga	Vrindha	
2017	Mojo	"Maaye Kanasalo"	S. D. Aravind	Pradeep Goutham		
2017	Biko	"Bachhiduve"	Peter M. Joseph	Arun Shetty	Anuradha Bhat	
2017	Mahanubhavaru	"Barada Besigeyalli" "Kallinantha Ee Hrudayadalli" "Preethiyannu"	Sathish Mourya	Srinivas; Sathish Mourya		
2017	Pani Puri	"Mareyalagade Ee Bandha"	Santosh Bagalakote	Santhosh Bagalakote		
2017	Smuggler	"Kannalli Kannalli"	Chakri	Ramesh	Anuradha Bhat	
2018	Neenillada Male	"Yaakeetharaha"	Indrasena	Indrasena		
2018	Raghuveera	"Nanna Chinna Anitha"	Laya Kokila	Soorya Sathish		
2018	Chinnada Gombe	"Ninna Jotheya"	Dhanasheelan	Prashanth Ramesh	Anuradha Bhat	
2018	Mukhyamantri Kaldodnallappo	"Munjane Manjinanthe"	Nayan V. K.	V. Nagendra Prasad	Anuradha Bhat	
2018	Yogi Duniya	"Ilidalo Manadali"	B. J. Bharath	Arasu Anthare	Aishwarya Rangarajan	
2018	Maduve Dibbana	"Halunda Namma" "Hetthavva"	A. T. Raveesh	S. Umesh; Nagesh Ujjaini	Anuradha Bhat	
2018	Krishna Tulasi	"Khali Kanninalli"	Kiran Ravindranath	Hrudaya Shiva	Anuradha Bhat	
2018	Rukku	"Nooru Haale"	A. T. Raveesh	Dhananjay Adugur		
2018	Yar Yaaro Gori Mele	"Fullu Feeling"	Loki	S. R. Jayaprakash		
2018	Saaguva Daariyalli	"Saaguthide"	S. Nagu	Shivakumar C. S. Gowda		
2018	Vanilla	"Onde Mathalli"	B. J. Bharath	Jayanth Kaikini		
2018	Chitte	"Sona Sona" "Nore Nore Haalalli"	M. L. Prasanna	M. L. Prasanna		
2018	Mesthri	"Kempu Gulabi"	G. R. Shankar	S. Rajkiran	Ritisha Padmanabhan	
2018	Trataka	"Hingu Iruthade"	Arun Suradha	V. Nagendra Prasad		
2018	Gaanchali	"Usire Usire"	Chandan Shetty	A. P. Arjun	Supriya Lohith	
2018	Rangada Hudugaru	"Enagideyo Nanagenadgideyo"	Senapathy	Dilse Dilip	Anuradha Bhat	
2018	Kappe Raaga - The Song of Kumbara, A Night Frog	"Kappe Raaga"	Ashwin P Kumar	Pradeep Sastry	Arundhati Vashishta	
2019	Yaarige Yaruntu	"Chiravaada Preethi"	B J Bharath	K. Kalyan	Eesha Suchi	
2019	Hanigalu	"Neenele"	Dinesh Kumar	Nagesh B H		
2019	Rugged	"Ninnanne Preethisuve"	Abhiman Roy	Srimahesh Gowda		
2019	Krishna Garments	"Hrudaya Hrudaya"	Raghu Dhanvantri	Siddu Poornachandra		
2019	Onti	"Yaaru Illa"	Manoj S	K. Kalyan		
2019	Manassinaata	"Elli Dooravadeyo"	Sachin	V. Nagendra Prasad		
2019	Geetha	"Helade Kelade"	Anoop Rubens	Ghouse Peer	Ananya Bhat	
2019	Premasura	"Mellane Shuruvagide" "Novina Butthina"	Sriharsha	Nagamurthy Palasandra	Anuradha Bhat	
2019	Neuron	"Chel Chel Cheluve"	Gurukiran	V. Nagendra Prasad	Anuradha Bhat	

=== 2020–present ===
Year	Film	Song(s)	Music composer	Lyricist	Co-singer(s)	Notes
2020	Demo Piece	"Ontiyagi Saagide"	Arjun Ramu	Geleya Sumesh		
2020	Hulidurga	"Nee Bareda Kadambari"	Sathish Babu	V. Nagendra Prasad	Anuradha Bhat	
2020	Aleyaagi Baa (album)	"Aleyagi Baa"	Bharath BJ	Simple Suni	Asha Bhat	
2021	Vikky	"Ondu Dina"	Peter M Joseph	Arun Shetty		
2021	Naanu Nan Jaanu	"Usire Usire"	Sridhar Kashyap	Srihari	Anuradha Bhat	
2021	Kanasu Maratakkide	"Ninna Nodi"	Manasa Holla	Chethan Kumar	Manasa Holla	
2021	Nimmooru	"Nove Madaythalla"	Abhinandan Kashyap	Hanuraj Madhugiri		
2021	Chaddi Dost Kaddi Alladusbutta	"Ola Olave"	Ananth Aryan	Lokendra Surya	Anuradha Bhat	
2021	Mugilpete	"Yarivalu Bangaradanthavalu" "Doora Hogo Munna"	Sridhar V Sambhram	Jayanth Kaikini; Pramod Maravanthe	Anuradha Bhat	
2021	Nan Hesaru Kishora	"Ajjanige Mommagane"	Manju Kavi	Manju Kavi		
2021	Jenumale Madesha (album)	"Maygara Maygara" "Shubada Dinavi"	Subramani	Hamsalekha		
2022	DNA	"Mellane Mellane"	Chethan Krishna	K. Y. Narayanaswamy	Anuradha Bhat	
2022	Bhavachitra	"Yaro Neenu Chowkidara" "Yaare Neenu Nera"	Gowthan Srivatsa	Shivu Bergi	Anuradha Bhat	
2022	Mysuru	"Naguthiruva Aa Nayanagalu"	Ramani Sundaresan	Ravishankar Nag	Usha Prakash	
2022	Sri Halekote Hanumanta Deva Saradahole (album)	"Anjaneyane"	Raju Naik Chitrapura	Raju Naik Chitrapura		
2022	Melobba Mayavi	"Raani Jenu"	L. N. Shastry	Chakravarthy Chandrachood	Anuradha Bhat	
2022	Anger	"Baa Baare"	Vijay Haritasa	Aravinda B. V.	Anuradha Bhat	
2022	Kandhidi Nodona	"Baanu Bhoomi"	Sridhar Kashyap	Pramod Acharya	Aishwarya Rangarajan	
2022	Dheeran	"Ore Oreva"	Ganesh Narayan	Simple Suni		
2022	Trivikrama	"Hey Hrudayave"	Arjun Janya	V. Nagendra Prasad	Ankita Kundu	
2022	Namma Hudugaru	"Kushiyalli Nasheyalli"	Abhimann Roy	Ghouse Peer		
2022	Ravi Bopanna	"Madire Madire"	V. Ravichandran	V. Ravichandran	Indu Nagaraj	
2022	Shiva 143	"Preethiya Parichaya"	Arjun Janya	Garuda Ram		
2022	Tajmahal 2	"Nanna Hrudayada"	Vikram Selva	Manvarshi Navalagunda		
2022	9 Sullu Kathegalu	"Preethi Hoovu"	Praveen - Pradeep	Vikram Vasisht	Chandana Vasisht	
2022	Katha Lekhana	"Dina Dina Anudina"	Karanam Sri Raghavendra	Sathya Rathnam	Anuradha Bhat	
2022	Pankhuri	"Nangyaru Illa Illi"	Chandru Obaiha	Manu Harsha		
2022	Modala Miditha	"Preethiya Maaley" "Mungaru Manadalli"	Haricheth	Haricheth	Vani Harikrishna; Nithya Mammen	
2022	Jordan	"Prathiyondu Pathrake"	Sai Sarvesh	Sai Sarvesh		
2022	Love Story 1998	"Baalinalli Beladingala"	Raghav Subhash; Sam	Devaraja S	Anuradha Bhat	
2022	Rudheera Kanive	"Hrudayada Hosa"	A. T. Raveesh	Sathish Ekalavya		
2022	—N/a	"Guruvara Bandithu"	R. N. Jayagopal	R. N. Jayagopal		
2023	Thugs of Ramaghada	"Nagu Nagutha"	Vivek Chakravarthy	V. Nagendra Prasad	Anuradha Bhat	
2023	Long Drive	"Mayaviye"	Vikas Vasishta	Jeevan	Manasa Holla	
2023	Ondanondu Kaladalli	"Minchu Moda"	Yashwanth Bhupathi	Praveen		
2023	Bhikshuka	"Devarenuva Devanobba" "Koogi Karedonu"	Kiran Waugh	V. Nagendra Prasad; S. K. Kali		
2023	Ondolle Love Story	"Kannalle Naguvalle"	Akash Jadav	Vasu Vathsale	Asha Bhat, Akash Jadav	
2023	SLV - Siri Lambodara Vivaha	"SLV Title track"	Sangharsh Kumar	Bhargava Hegde	Varijashree Venugopal	
2023	Antharanga	"Naa Ninna Kanda"	Chethan Sosca	Kaviraj	Anuradha Bhat	
2023	Ambassador	"Who Are You"	Gurukiran	V. Manohar		
2023	Praja Rajya	"Nashe Yerisuva"	Vijeth Manjaiah	V. Nagendra Prasad	Anuradha Bhat	
2023	Ramachari 2.0	"Bangariye"	Sundar Murthy	Manju Doddamani		
2023	Avanthika	"Neene Neene"	Vinu Manasu	Kempegowda Magadi		
2023	Present Prapancha 0% Love	"Ivala Andha" "Hey Gulabi"	K. V. Ravichandra	K. V. Ravichandra	Rashmi Mahadev	
2023	Jersey Number 10	"O Maleye"	Zubin Paul	Raghavendra B	Mythri Iyer	
2023	Gadayuddha	"Ninna Saniha"	S. Solomon	Chethan Aniketh	Anuradha Bhat	
2023	Modala Male	"Modala Male"	Prasanna Bhojashettar	Shivakumar DVG	Nishma Rakshak	
2023	90 Bidi Manig Nadi	"90 Bidi" "Balu Naraka Eega"	Kiran Shankar	V. Nagendra Prasad		
2023	Savithri	"Magale Muddu Magale"	Hrudaya Shiva	Hrudaya Shiva		
2023	O Manase	"Muddu Muddagi"	Jassie Gift	Kaviraj		
2023	Ambuja	"Oh My Love"	Prasanna Kumar	Kashinath D Madivalar		
2023	Madhura Kavya	"Ondu Hrudayada" "Nodalilla Yaru" "Belaku Needuva"	Sathish Mourya	Madhusudhan		
2023	Paramvah	"Bhoorameli"	Aparijith	Shivaraj, Nagesh Kundapura, Shree Thalageri		
2023	Parimala D'Souza	"Idu Nanna Ninna"	Christopher Jayson	Vinod Sheshadri	Shruthi V. S.	
2023	Baanadariyalli	"Baanadariyalli Hode Elli"	Arjun Janya	Kaviraj		
2023	Inamdaar	"Jeeva Jaaro Munna"	Rakesh Acharya	Rakesh Acharya		
2023	Cycle Savari	"Muddu Bangara"	Rohan S Desai	Devu K Ambiga	Surabhi Bharadwaj	
2024	Karunada Kanmani	"Singanallurinda"	Harsha Kagodu	Srithej		
2024	Klaantha	"Mahimeda Mannad"	S. P. Chandrakanth	Shashiraj Kavoor		
2024	Alexa	"Prema Pranaya" "Yaare Nee Yaare" "Cheluvige Cheluve"	APO	V. Nagendra Prasad	Anuradha Bhat	
2024	Click	"Shuruvaada Darige"	Vishwas Kaushik	Kinnal Raj		
2024	Karataka Damanaka	"Deega Digari" "Meetadene Veene"	V. Harikrishna	Yogaraj Bhat	Upendra	
2024	Muktha Manasu	"Cheluvaada Cheluvane"	Vaishakh Shashidharan	R. C. Rangashekar	Anuradha Bhat	
2024	Ratna	"Modala Dinada Maathu" "Ninna Kangalu"	Sathish Babu	Basavaraj Bellary	Shruti Prahlada	
2024	Ithyadi	"Muddada Manasali"	Raj Bhaskar	Ranganath		
2024	Usire Usire	"Nenape Nenape" "Modalasala"	Vivek Chakravarthy	Yogaraj Bhat; K. Kalyan		
2024	Family Drama	"Sathyad Mane Haala"	Chethan Ammayya	Sharath Vasisht		
2024	Ishq	"Kanna Muchidaru"	Shriram Gandharva	Nirmala Madhusudhan		
2024	The Journalist	"Karedare Naanu"	Sagar Shastry	Akash Gulabi		
2024	Gopilola	"Vidhiyaado Natakada" "Ninnane Ninnane"	Midhun Asokan	Keshava Chandra		
2024	Simharoopini	"Kula Koti Devathegalu"	Akash Parva	Kinnal Raj		
2024	Nassab	"Nadu Sanna Hudugi"	Ragam	Ragam	Manasa Holla	
2025	Swechha	"Preethi Tanantane"	Loki Thavasya	Loki Thavasya	Anuradha Bhat	
2025	Alle Draw Alle Bahumana	"Bechhane Goodina"	Vijay Raj	Dheeraj Shetty		
2025	Raja Rani	"Suriyuva Maleyali"	Sudhan Prakash	Sudhan Prakash	Vijetha	
2025	Olavina Payana	"Gaali Gandha"	Sai Sarvesh	Sai Sarvesh		
2025	Kanasondu Shuruvagide	"Kanasondu"	Suraj Jois	Simple Suni		
2025	Nimde Kathe	"Payanigana Payana"	Praveen Niketan	C. S. Raghavendra		
2025	Kora	"Oppikondalo"	B. R. Hemanth Kumar	Revanna Nayak	Shruthi V. S.	
2025	Amruthamathi	"Yenayitho Olage"	Shamitha Malnad	Baraguru Ramachandrappa		
2025	Taane C/O Srirampura	"Smile Kotlu"	Manasa Holla	Lakshmi Ramesh		
2025	Bharavase	"Mussanjeli"	Harsha Kagodu	Sritheja	Anuradha Bhat	
2025	Usiru	"Nannusire Nannusire"	Ganesh Narayanan	Bhairava Rama		
2025	Middle Class Ramayana	"Hrudayada Maharani"	Alex	Dinesh Lucky		
2026	Theertharoopa Thandeyavarige	"Hetthavara Jeevavu"	Joe Costa	Ramenahalli Jagannatha		
2026	Raktha Kashmira	"Buguri"	Gurukiran	Shekharappa Huligiri		
2026	Maggi Pusthaka	"Olle Huduga"	Yashas Nachappa	Gurunath Boragi		
2026	Alpha	"Hero"	Anoop Seelin	Nagarjun Sharma		
2026	Kanna Muchhe	"Nija Heluve"	Rajesh Ramnath	Local Loki		
2026	Aa Ondu Notu	"Neenu Endare"	Kaushik	K. Kalyan		
2026	America America 2	"Ee Dhareya Mele"	Mano Murthy	Nagathihalli Chandrashekar	Shreya Ghoshal	
