= Police officer (disambiguation) =

A police officer is a warranted employee of a police force.

"Police officer" or "police officers" may also refer to:

- Police Officer (film), a 1992 film
- Police Officers (film), a 2002 film
