= Tanu Roy =

Indian actress and model (born 1980)

- Born: Tanu Roy; Kolkata, India
- Other names: Tanu Rai, Tanushree Ghosh
- Occupations: actress, model
- Years active: 2001–2013, 2017

Tanu Roy is an Indian actress and model. A Bengali by birth, she has predominantly appeared in Telugu films apart from some Tamil, Malayalam, Bengali and Kannada films. She is mostly known for her item numbers in films like Mass and Hero. She is known for her role in the Malayalam movie Ee Adutha Kalathu.

== Career ==
Tanu Roy was born and brought up in Kolkata. She is a commerce graduate. She made her acting debut in 2001 with Puri Jagannadh's Itlu Sravani Subramanyam, after which she played small roles in Anandam and Manasantha Nuvve. She appeared in Avunu Nijame and Kodi Ramakrishna's Keelu Gurram. Later, she starred in low budget B movies and did many item numbers in films including Satyam, Mass, No, Viyyalavari Kayyalu and Pellikani Prasad.

She was seen in two Bengali films; Basho Na, in which she portrayed the role of a young widow, and Moner Majho Tumhi, a remake of Mansantha Nuvve, and in the Kannada films Love Story, which is a remake of the Telugu film Maro Charitra and was earlier titled Prema Charitra. The first Kannada film she shot for, Preethi Maadabaaradu, was shelved in the middle. In Tamil, she starred in the films Indru and Girivalam, a remake of the Hindi film Humraaz.

Tanu made her debut in Malayalam in the 2012 film Ee Adutha Kaalathu as Tanushree Ghosh and won critical acclaim for her portrayal of Madhuri, the mother of a 10-year-old boy. In Orissa, she played a social activist, who works for the welfare of tribal people in a village.

Her upcoming film is Amar Babu's Ala Jarigindi Oka Roju, which is the Telugu remake of the 2006 British crime comedy flick, Big Nothing. She has also shot for a cameo in Hashim Marrikar's Preview.

She also participated in the Telugu television shows Naacho Rrey and Humma Humma.

== Filmography ==
Year	Film	Role	Language	Notes
2001	Itlu Sravani Subramanyam	Sravani	Telugu	
2001	Anandam	Deepika	Telugu	
2001	Manasantha Nuvve	Shruti	Telugu	
2003	Indru	Jeniffer	Tamil	
2003	Satyam		Telugu	Special appearance
2003	Moner Majhe Tumi	Shruti	Bengali	
2004	Avunu Nijame	Ruchita	Telugu	
2004	Megham		Telugu	
2004	No		Telugu	Special appearance
2004	Mass		Telugu	Special appearance
2004	Pellikani Pellam Avuthundi		Telugu	
2005	Keelu Gurram	Rajani	Telugu	
2005	Prayatnam		Telugu	
2005	Girivalam	Priya	Tamil	
2005	Meghamala - O Pellam Gola	Meghamala	Telugu	
2005	Nammanna		Kannada	Special appearance
2005	Love Story	Swapna	Kannada	
2007	Akhari Page		Telugu	
2007	Viyyalavari Kayyalu		Telugu	Special appearance
2007	Rudramani		Telugu	
2008	Pellikani Prasad		Telugu	Special appearance
2008	Hero		Telugu	Special appearance
2011	Katha Screenplay Darshakatvam Appalaraju	Sarala	Telugu	Special appearance
2012	Ee Adutha Kaalathu	Madhuri Kurien	Malayalam	
2012	Ala Jarigindi Oka Roju		Telugu	
2013	Orissa	Meera Bhai	Malayalam	
2013	D Company	Zarina Mohammed	Malayalam	
2013	Preview		Malayalam	
2013	O Manjula Katha		Telugu	
2013	Balyakalasakhi	Shabnam	Malayalam	
2017	Gemini	Anusree	Malayalam	
2017	Prachayi	Radhika Nair	Malayalam	
