= Indru =

- DVD cover
- Directed by: Naveen S. Muthuraman
- Written by: Naveen S. Muthuraman, Kalyanji (dialogues)
- Produced by: R. Dhakshinamoorthy
- Starring: Karthik; Tanu Roy; Maina; Karunas
- Cinematography: U. K. Senthil Kumar
- Edited by: Suresh Urs
- Music by: Deva
- Production company: Kashyap Productions
- Release date: 25 December 2003
- Running time: 146 minutes
- Country: India
- Language: Tamil

Indru (transl. Today) is a 2003 Indian Tamil-language war film written and directed by Naveen S. Muthuraman. It stars Karthik, Tanu Roy and Maina in the lead roles. The film was released on 25 December 2003.

== Cast ==
- Karthik as Goutham
- Tanu Roy as Jennifer
- Maina as Nanditha
- Karunas as Vishwanath
- Devan as Ramprasad
- Nizhalgal Ravi as Colonel Somnath
- Delhi Ganesh as Richard's father
- Pyramid Natarajan as Minister Oppilamani
- Thalaivasal Vijay as Superior Officer
- Sriman as Richard D'Souza
- Ajay Rathnam as Superior Officer
- Vasu Vikram as S.P. Elumalai
- Kumaresan as Pandian
- Radhika Chaudhari as Nandini
- Fathima Babu as Gauthaman's mother
- Madhan Bob as Minister's P.A
- Naren as Ramprasad's henchman
- Raj Kapoor as Captain Kapoor
- Ramji as Selvam

== Soundtrack ==
The soundtrack was composed by Deva and consists of 5 songs.

Song	Singers	Lyrics	Length
Karthikai Aanavale	Harish Raghavendra, Sujatha	Yugabharathi	05:48
Salwar Poovanam	Krishnaraj	Na. Muthukumar	05:54
Shokka Adikkura	Tippu, Anuradha Sriram	Na. Muthukumar	05:04
Ponmaalai	Karthik	Na. Muthukumar	04:53
Vettu Adha	Malgudi Subha	Naveen S. Muthuraman	04:58

== Reception ==
Malini Mannath of Chennai Online wrote that "It's still a fascinating experience watching this actor [Karthik] in action, his endearing natural ease and spontaneity. But the fire in him is missing and the disinterest shows on the screen". A critic from The Hindu wrote, "Initially Naveen Muthuraman (the story, screenplay, dialogue and direction are his) gives the impression that patriotic fervour will dominate the proceedings. But soon it turns out to be just another story of bad and good men, their guessable ploys and boring [cliches]".
