= Mayur Patel =

Indian actor

- Occupations: Actor; director
- Years active: 2000–present
- Father: Madan Patel

Mayur Patel is an Indian actor and director who works in Kannada-language films. He is known for his role in the film Mani (2003).

== Career ==
Mayur Patel made his lead debut in the film Mani (2003). The film released to positive reviews although the film failed at the box office. He next starred in Love Story (2005), a remake of the 1978 Telugu film Maro Charitra. He was reported to act in the Kannada remake of Arinthum Ariyamalum (2005), the Kannada remake of Kokki (2006), the Kannada remake of Iddaru Attala Muddula Alludu (2006), the Tamil remake of Muniya (2009), and direct the Hindi remake of his father Madan Patel's Yaarivanu (2013), but none of the films entered production.

In 2014, Patel participated in the second season of the reality television show Bigg Boss Kannada. He made his comeback as a lead actor with Rajeeva (2020), but the film released to mixed reviews. He turned director for Thamate (2024) starring his father Madan Patel. In the thriller Mango Pachcha (2026), Patel played Nagappa, Sanchith Sanjeev's half-brother, who is hired by him to manage his marijuana business. A. Sharadhaa of The New Indian Express wrote, "Mayur, as Nagappa, effectively captures the intersection of business, politics, and family interests."

== Filmography ==
- All films are in Kannada.

Year	Film	Role	Notes
2000	Andhra Hendthi		
2003	Mani	Kummi	Also playback singer
2004	Ok Saar Ok	Imaginary man	Special appearance and playback singer in "Wonder Lokada"
2005	Udees	Sathya	
2005	Gunna	Shambhu	
2005	Love Story	Ram	Also playback singer
2006	Hetthavara Kanasu		
2006	Student		
2007	Ninade Nenapu	Vijay	
2009	Muniya	Muniya	
2010	Hunja	Shivu/Kiran	
2013	Yaarivanu	Madhav Swamy	
2013	Slum	Lucky	
2020	Rajeeva	Rajeeva, Bheemanna	Dual roles
2024	Pepe	Guna	
2024	Yala Kunni	Maraka	
2024	Thamate	—N/a	As director
2026	Mango Pachcha	Nagappa	
