= Disha Poovaiah =

Indian actress

- Occupation: Actress

Disha Poovaiah is an Indian actress who works predominantly in Kannada films.

== Career ==
Disha Poovaiah appeared in a cameo role in 2011 Kannada language film Hudugaru. Of her role in the film, she said, "In ‘Hudugaru’ I made a small presence opposite Vishal Hegde and I accepted only because it was Puneeth Rajkumar film". In the same year, she appeared in Police Story 3. In 2013, The year also saw her release Slum. In 2014, Poovaiah filmed with Nam Life Story, a film based on a true story of six Bangalorean friends on their stay in Tamil Nadu.

As of 2019, she was filming with Gadhayuddha, playing the love interest of a middle-aged bachelor.

== Filmography ==
Key
†	Denotes films that have not yet been released

- All films are in Kannada, unless otherwise noted.

Year	Film	Role	Notes	Ref.
2011	Hudugaru		Special appearance	
2011	Police Story 3			
2013	Agamya			
2013	Aashirwada	Bhoomika		
2013	Slum			
2014	Malli			
2014	Nayakanahatti Shree Guru Thipperudraswamy Mahatme			
2015	Sri Sai			
2015	Daniklena Joklu		Tulu film	
2016	Birth			
2016	Sri Omkara Ayyappane			
2017	Real Police			
2017	Anveshi			
2018	Shiva Paru	Paru		
2019	Okate Life		Telugu film	
2022	Rudheera Kanive			
