= Girivalam (film) =

- DVD cover
- Directed by: T. Shivraaj
- Screenplay by: T. Shivraaj
- Produced by: A. Ahmed
- Starring: Shaam; Richard; Roshini; Anamica
- Cinematography: R. Selva
- Edited by: L. Kesavan
- Music by: Deva
- Production company: Variety Frames
- Release date: 1 April 2005
- Running time: 136 minutes
- Country: India
- Language: Tamil

Girivalam is a 2005 Indian Tamil-language romantic thriller film written and directed by T. Shivraj. The film stars Shaam, Richard, Roshini and Anamica. It is a remake of the 2002 Hindi film Humraaz.

== Plot ==
Arjun heads a dance troupe, and Priya, one of the dancers, is secretly in love with him. Their dream is to become a permanent fixture at Giriprasad's hotel, a wealthy businessman. Though they lose the competition, their dream is realized when the lead dancer of the winning troupe dies in an accident. Giriprasad falls in love with Priya, and his sincerity wins her over. However, it is revealed that Arjun had been scheming to have Priya marry Giriprasad to access his wealth.

Swetha, another dancer in the troupe, discovers that Arjun intentionally killed the lead dancer and covered his death up as an accident. She blackmails him for money, threatening to expose the truth to Giriprasad and the police. Arjun meets her to pay but instead kills her. Before dying, Swetha manages to leave a voicemail on Giriprasad's phone, exposing Arjun. Meanwhile, Priya faces a dilemma between her love for Giriprasad and her personal dreams. Distraught, she has an accident but later recovers from a coma. She decides to stay with Giriprasad, which enrages Arjun, prompting him to seek revenge.

Arjun manipulates the situation by lying to Giriprasad that Priya is giving him stolen money. Giriprasad spies on them and grows suspicious. Later, he discovers Swetha's recording and uses it to blackmail Arjun into killing Priya to catch him in the act. Giriprasad instructs Arjun to attack Priya when she answers a phone call, intending to hear her scream. Unaware of the plot, Priya records a confession for Giriprasad, expressing her remorse and asking for forgiveness.

As the plan unfolds, Arjun attacks Priya, and Giriprasad listens to her screams over the phone. However, Priya survives, saved by Arjun, who later blames the attack on a small-time thief who is killed. Arjun then blackmails Giriprasad using a recording of their meeting about the murder, giving him three choices: divorce Priya, go to jail, or commit suicide. The next day, Giriprasad meets Arjun at the designated spot and confronts him, rips up his contract, and decides to risk being imprisoned by killing Arjun to ensure justice.

A violent fight ensues between the two men, with Giriprasad's supporters intervening, only to be killed by Arjun. Just as Arjun is about to kill Giriprasad, Priya intervenes and confronts the former, revealing her realization of Arjun's murderous nature. Arjun shoots her, but she manages to survive and, in a dramatic turn, uses his gun to fatally shoot him. Arjun gradually succumbs to his death, and Giriprasad and Priya reunite, finally free from Arjun's manipulations.

== Cast ==
- Shyam I. R. as Arjun
- Richard as Giriprasad
- Roshini as Priya
- Anamica as Swetha
- Charle as Pavadai
- K. Rajan as Wedding Guest
- Ramesh Khanna as Gowrishankar
- K. R. Indira as Giriprasad's grandmother
- T. Shivraaj as himself

== Production ==
The film is directed by Shivraj, who previously helmed Adi Thadi (2004) and is the second venture of Variety Frames after Kadhal Kirukkan (2003). It is a remake of the Hindi film Humraaz (2002). The film was being shot during August 2004, and the film was almost done shooting during September 2004.

== Soundtrack ==
The music was composed by Deva. The song "Nee Yaaro Nee Yaaro" is a remake of the song "Bardaasht Nahin Kar Sakta" from the original Hindi film and it is also the only song from the original Hindi version.

Song	Singers	Lyrics	Length (m:ss)
"Adiyae Aandaal Amma"	Ranjith, Anuradha Sriram	Piraisoodan	04:18
"Mayavarathu Kaara"	Shoba Chandrasekhar, Karthik	Snehan	04:46
"Nee Yaaro Nee Yaaro"	Tippu, Harini	Pa. Vijay	05:07
"Solvaaya Solvaaya"	Ranjith, Anuradha Sriram, Sridevi	Pa. Vijay	05:11
"Meesa Vecha Paiya"	Anuradha Sriram	Snehan	04:12

== Release ==
Girivalam was released alongside the low budget films Gurudeva and Thaka Thimi Tha and did not fare well at the box office.
