= Hero (2008 film) =

- Promotional poster
- Directed by: G. V. Sudhakar Naidu
- Screenplay by: G. V. Sudhakar Naidu
- Story by: Ravi; G. V. Sudhakar Naidu
- Produced by: Manyam Ramesh
- Starring: Nithiin; Bhavana; Ramya Krishna; Kota Srinivasa Rao; Brahmanandam; Nagendra Babu
- Cinematography: C. Ramprasad
- Edited by: Marthand K. Venkatesh
- Music by: Mani Sharma
- Release date: 24 October 2008
- Running time: 146 minutes
- Country: India
- Language: Telugu

Hero is a 2008 Indian Telugu-language action comedy film directed by actor G. V. Sudhakar Naidu (in his directorial debut) and starring Nithiin, Bhavana, Ramya Krishna, Kota Srinivasa Rao, Brahmanandam, Nagendra Babu and others. The film was produced by Manyam Ramesh and the music composed by Mani Sharma. It was released on 24 October 2008 to mixed reviews.

The film was later dubbed into Malayalam as Police Academy and into Hindi as Ladenge Hum Marte Dum Tak (2011) and in Bhojpuri Ladab Hum Aakhiri Saans Tak.

== Synopsis ==
Nagendra Naidu is a powerful police officer. He wants to see his son Radhakrishna a.k.a. Radha also as a good police officer. He always dreams of his son bashing the dons and getting a state government's medal, which should be presented through his hands. However, his wife, Sarala, wants to see her son as a superstar. Then a peculiar GO gets passed by the state government, by which any honest person is eligible for a Police job. As Nagendra Naidu convinces his wife that all the training that is needed for a film hero could be learnt in just three months' time in the Police Academy, Sarala agrees to join him in the Police Academy. Radha falls in love with Krishnaveni, alias Krishna, at the police academy. The latter, too, loses her heart to him. At this juncture, her photo appears on the TV, saying that she was a big Naxalite leader. The actual story gets revealed with a small twist. Was Krishna framed as a Naxalite, or is she really a Naxalite? What happens to the love between Radha and Krishna? How far was Radha able to fulfill the dream of his father, Nagendra Naidu? The answers to all these questions form the second half of the film.

== Cast ==
- Nithiin as Radhakrishna "Radha"
- Bhavana as Krishnaveni/Krishna
- Ramya Krishna as Triveni Naik (Police Academy Director)
- Kota Srinivasa Rao as Ram Mohan Rao
- Nagendra Babu as Nagendra Naidu
- Brahmanandam as Sr. Member at Police Training Academy
- Kovai Sarala as Sarala
- Tanu Roy
- Sree Vishnu
- Babu Mohan
- Ali as Dasari Ravi
- Ajay
- Naresh
- Narsing Yadav
- Satyam Rajesh
- Sameer
- Fish Venkat
- Kapil Khanna
- Jogi Naidu
- Malladi Raghava
- Vizag Prasad

== Songs ==
The music was composed by Mani Sharma and released by Aditya Music.

Hero

Soundtrack album by Mani Sharma
- Released: 10 September 2008
- Recorded: 2008
- Genre: Soundtrack
- Length: 27:14
- Label: Aditya Music

Mani Sharma chronology
Yuvatha (2008)	Hero (2008)	Souryam (2008)

Track list
No.	Title	Lyrics	Artist(s)	Length
1.	"Sye Kurrade"	Ananta Sriram	Rahul Nambiar, Rita	04:27
2.	"Kannullona"	Ananta Sriram	Haricharan, Priya Himesh	04:43
3.	"Yahoo Yahoo"	Ananta Sriram	Janani Madhan (Jey), Karthik	04:19
4.	"Ka Kalavye"	Ananta Sriram	Ranjith, Rita	04:30
5.	"Naa Vayase"	Bhaskarabhatla Ravi Kumar	Hemachandra, Geetha Madhuri	04:30
6.	"Kannullona" (Repeat)	Ananta Sriram	Haricharan, Priya	04:43
Total length:				27:14
