= Rajeeva =

- Promotional poster
- Directed by: Flying King Manju
- Story by: B M Ramesh
- Produced by: B M Ramesh; Kiran K
- Starring: Mayur Patel; Akshatha Sreedhar Shastry
- Cinematography: Anand Ilayaraja
- Edited by: Vijay Sower
- Music by: Rohit Sower
- Production company: RK Cine Creations
- Release date: 3 January 2020
- Country: India
- Language: Kannada

Rajeeva IAS is a 2020 Indian Kannada-language drama film directed by Flying King Manju and starring Mayur Patel in dual roles and Akshatha Sreedhar Shastry. The film was released to negative reviews.

== Cast ==
- Mayur Patel as Rajeeva and Bheemanna
- Akshatha Sreedhar Shastry as Rajeeva's wife
- Shankar Ashwath
- Niharika
- Vardhan
- Madan Patel as Chief Minister (guest appearance)

== Reception ==
A critic from The Times of India rated the film two out of five stars and wrote that "Mayur Patel, who makes his comeback with this film, shines as the passionate Rajeeva, but that isn't enough to salvage the rest. Watch it if movies revolving around agriculture fascinate you.". A critic from Cinema Express wrote that "Rajeeva is yet another film that attempts to shine the spotlight on the farmers. However, this film is not very convincing, and the audience will do better to watch Rajkumar’s performance in the evergreen film, Bangarada Manushya". A critic from The News Minute wrote that "Rajeeva is yet another film that attempts to put farmers in the limelight but fails in the execution because the makers were too involved in the imitation game. Here's hoping that the makers realise there can only be one Bangarada Manushya, and try out other genres in their next film".
