= Muniya =

- VCD cover
- Directed by: T. Nagachandra
- Written by: Malavalli Saikrishna (dialogue)
- Screenplay by: S. Kumar
- Story by: T. Nagachandra
- Produced by: A Rajgopal Reddy; M Muniraju
- Starring: Mayur Patel; Sahitya
- Cinematography: Mathew Rajan
- Edited by: Damodar Kanasur
- Music by: Abhimann Roy
- Production company: Sri Sadguru Entertainers
- Release date: 24 July 2009
- Country: India
- Language: Kannada

Muniya is a 2009 Indian Kannada-language romantic action drama film directed by T. Nagachandra and starring Mayur Patel and Sahitya. The film was released to negative reviews.

== Cast ==
- Mayur Patel as Muniya
- Sahitya as Gowri
- Sheethal
- Rangayana Raghu
- Komal

== Soundtrack ==
The music is composed by Abhimann Roy.

Track listing
No.	Title	Singer(s)	Length
1.	"Attack Machi"	Badri Prasad	4:46
2.	"Daasiya Madiko"	K. S. Chithra	5:10
3.	"Kanhi Kari Hudugiyoblu"	Sunitha S. Murali, G. Gurumurthy	4:01
4.	"O Chandamama"	Rajesh Krishnan, Shreya Ghoshal	4:49
5.	"O Chandamama Theme"	—	4:46
6.	"Ola Ola Olavina"	Hemanth, Anusha	4:31
Total length:			28:13

== Reception ==
A critic from Bangalore Mirror wrote that "Muniya is a film made for the sake of making one; not with not with the intention of narrating a good story. And like most such efforts, it fails". R. G. Vijayasarathy of Rediff.com rated the film one-and-a-half stars and wrote that "Go for this only if you have patience". A critic from IANS wrote that "If you have patience to withstand and watch the boring first half, Muniya may appeal to you in the second half".

== Remake ==
Amongst four films, Madan Patel announced the remake of Muniya titled Muniyandi in Tamil in December of 2010; however, the film was remade as Puli Vesham (2011). (Note: The remake credits the original story to Nagachandra.)
