= Heegu Unte =

- Directed by: Madan Patel
- Written by: Madan Patel
- Produced by: Madan Patel
- Starring: Madan Patel; Jai Akash
- Cinematography: R. D. Ravi
- Edited by: J. G. Krishna
- Music by: Adi (Mahesh Patel)
- Production company: Media International
- Release date: 24 October 2008
- Country: India
- Language: Kannada

Heegu Unte is a 2008 Indian Kannada-language drama film directed by Madan Patel and starring himself and Jai Akash.

== Plot ==
The film is about the problems faced by women in the garment industry.

== Cast ==
- Madan Patel as Annaiah
- Jai Akash
- Sushil Kumar
- Madhu Goumathi
- Ravi Teja
- Harshita
- Vanitha
- Satya Prakash

== Release and reception ==
The film was released on 24 October 2008 coinciding with Sangama to negative reviews.

A critic from Bangalore Mirror rated the film one out of five stars and wrote that "It is doubtful if the audience will watch this film even at gunpoint. They will either doze off or run away disregarding the gun pointed by Madan Patel, who is the film’s leading man, director, script writer and a host of other things combined". R. G. Vijayasarathy of IANS wrote that "Heegu Unte is a film that should be avoided at any cost".

== Controversy ==
Madan Patel pointed his gun at a senior news photographer KN Nageshkumar for badmouthing the film and Nageshkumar subsequently filed a police complaint.
