= Ninade Nenapu =

- Directed by: Madan Patel
- Written by: Madan Patel; Raghu G Ram; V Anand
- Produced by: M Chinmayi; C Chandrachari
- Starring: Mayur Patel; Maya
- Cinematography: Venus Murthy
- Edited by: Yathish Kumar V.
- Music by: Adi (Mahesh Patel); Ram Sampath
- Production company: Chinmayi Movies
- Release date: 10 August 2007
- Country: India
- Language: Kannada

Ninade Nenapu is a 2007 Indian Kannada-language romantic drama film directed by Madan Patel and starring Mayur Patel and newcomer Maya. The film's title is based on a song from Raja Nanna Raja (1976).

== Cast ==
- Mayur Patel as Vijay
- Maya as Shilpa
- Ananth Nag
- Harish Raj as Raj
- Renukamma Murgod

== Production ==
Maya from London made her debut through this film.

== Soundtrack ==
The music is composed by Adi (Mahesh Patel) and Ram Sampath. The song "Heegeke Naninda" is inspired from "Dole Dole" from Pokiri (2006).

Track listing
No.	Title	Lyrics	Music	Singer(s)	Length
1.	"Heegeke Nange"	Kaviraj	Adi	Kunal Ganjawala
2.	"Yaare Sakhi Ninna Sakha"	Anand V	Adi	Udit Narayan, Anuradha Sriram
3.	"Ibbaniyali Mindide"	Vishweshwara Bhat	Ram Sampath	K. S. Chithra
4.	"O Nanna Geleyane"	Manjunath Rao	Adi	Sona
5.	"Naana Kane"	Manjunath Rao	Adi	Rajesh Krishnan
6.	"Heegeke Naninda"	Manjunath Rao	Ram Sampath	Rajesh Krishnan
7.	"Naana Kane"	V. Nagendra Prasad	Adi	Chaithra, Nithin Shastry
8.	"Heegeke Naninda"	Manjunath Rao	Adi	Chaithra, Sathish Aryan

== Reception ==
A critic from The Times of India rated the film three out of five stars and wrote that "AFTER several experiments, the father-son duo of Madan and Mayur Patel has finally made a good movie. While Madan has deftly executed the story, screenplay and direction, Mayur shows good screen presence". R. G. Vijayasarathy of IANS rated the film one out of five stars and that "Ninade Nenapu ends up as a mediocre film and unfortunately Mayur may well have to wait for a right break as even his father has failed to deliver him a good script". A critic from Rediff.com wrote that "In a nutshell, this mediocre film has no soul".
