= Mani (film) =

2003 Indian film by Yograj Bhat

- VCD cover
- Directed by: Yograj Bhat
- Written by: Soori (Dialogues)
- Screenplay by: Yograj Bhat; Soori
- Story by: Kari Subbu
- Produced by: Kari Subbu
- Starring: Mayur Patel; Radhika
- Cinematography: Jnanamurthy (Sugnan)
- Edited by: S Manohar
- Music by: Score: Rajesh Ramanath; Songs: Raja
- Production company: Vaishnavi Visions
- Release date: 12 December 2003
- Running time: 136 minutes
- Country: India
- Language: Kannada

Mani is a 2003 Indian Kannada-language romance film written and directed by debutant Yograj Bhat. It features Radhika in the titular role, Mayur Patel and Umashree. While Umashree plays a prostitute, Radhika plays her daughter. The supporting cast includes Kashi, Avinash, Rangayana Raghu and Karisubbu. The score for the film is by Rajesh Ramanath and soundtrack for the film is by Raja. The film was dubbed in Tamil as Sollattuma with a few reshot scenes.

== Cast ==
- Mayur Patel as Kummi
- Radhika as Mani
- Umashree as Shantakka
- Sanketh Kashi as Dasanna
- Avinash as assistant commissioner of police
- Rangayana Raghu as Chami
- Karisubbu as corrupt police officer
- Anand
- Nagashekar
- Myna Chandru
- Renuka Prasad
- Joe Simon
- Karthik Sharma

== Soundtrack ==
Mani

Soundtrack album by Raja
- Genre: Feature film soundtrack
- Language: Kannada
- Label: Anand Audio
- Producer: Kari Subbu

The film's background score was composed by Rajesh Ramnath and the soundtracks are composed by Raja. The music rights were acquired by Ananda Audio.

Tracklist
No.	Title	Lyrics	Singer(s)	Length
1.	"Ratho Ratho"	Yogaraj Bhat	K. S. Chithra
2.	"Bengaluru Thayi Annamma"	Soori	B. Jayashree, Gururaj Hosakote, Mayur Patel, Nagendrika, Yogaraj Bhat
3.	"Nanna Edaya Thotadalli"	K. Kalyan	Rajesh Krishnan, M. D. Pallavi
4.	"Savira Nadigalella"	K. Kalyan	Shankar Mahadevan
5.	"Sangamavo"	Yogaraj Bhat	Nanditha, Bappi
6.	"Barede Premakathe"	K. Kalyan	Madhu Balakrishnan

== Reception ==
A critic from Viggy wrote that "In a nutshell, Yogaraj Bhat's Mani is a perfectly polished pearl that shines among the lot". A critic from Chitraloka wrote that "Hats off to the new director for striking to our eyes the realities happening around us. The style adopted by the director is simple yet marvelous". S. N. Deepak of Deccan Herald wrote: "Debutant director Yogaraj Bhat has done a brilliant job of depicting a hypocritical male dominated society, helplessness of a prostitute and the humanity surrounding it in this film." He added, "The story is well-knit and has a touch of freshness. The way in which love blooms between the two hearts in a prostitution area is watchable. The dialogues have been written carefully to avoid double meanings and vulgarity as the film also deals with prostitution." He concluded the performances of the lead actors and the art direction by Shashidhar Adapa.

== Awards ==
Award	Category	Recipient	Result	Ref
2003–04 Karnataka State Film Awards	Best Supporting Actor	Rangayana Raghu	Won	
2003–04 Karnataka State Film Awards	Best Supporting Actress	Umashree	Won	
2003–04 Karnataka State Film Awards	Best Story	Karisubbu	Won	
