= Andhra Hendthi =

- Directed by: A. R. Babu
- Written by: N. L. Narayanappa
- Screenplay by: A. R. Babu
- Produced by: N. L. Narayanappa
- Starring: Ramya Krishna; Madan Mallu; Anant Nag; Thriller Manju
- Cinematography: Prasad Babu
- Edited by: S. Prasad
- Music by: Shivamaya
- Production company: Supreem Star Movies
- Release date: 29 November 2000
- Country: India
- Language: Kannada

Andhra Hendthi (Kannada: ಆಂಧ್ರ ಹೆಂಡ್ತಿ) (transl. Andhra girl) is a 2000 Indian Kannada film, directed by A. R. Babu and produced by N. L. Narayanappa. The film stars Ramya Krishna, Madan Mallu, Anant Nag and Thriller Manju in lead roles. The film had musical score by Shivamaya.

== Cast ==
- Ramya Krishna
- Madan Mallu
- Anant Nag
- Thriller Manju
- Jayanthi
- Ashalatha
- Doddanna
- Karibasavaiah
- Mimicry Dayanand
- Shobaraj
- Avinash
- Tennis Krishna
- Shani Mahadevappa
- Alphonsa
- Pushpa Swamy
- Soumya
- Mayur Patel
- Rekha
- Sunitha
- Lakshmi

== Production ==
Madan Patel (credited as Madan Mallu) made his debut as a hero through this film.

== Reception ==
A critic from Online Bangalore wrote that "There is nothing new in the story line. Overall the movie is not bad but the audience can watch it only once".
