= Madan Patel =

Indian Film Director, Writer, Actor and Music Director

- Other name: Madan Mallu
- Occupations: film director; writer; actor; music director
- Years active: 1983–present
- Relatives: Mayur Patel (son)

Madan Patel is an Indian politician film director, producer, writer, actor and music director who works in Kannada-language films and State General secretary for the KPCC.

== Career ==
Madan Patel worked as an orchestra singer and managed an orchestra group. He made his debut as a lead actor with Andhra Hendthi (2000) co-starring Ramya Krishna. Regarding his performance, a critic wrote that "Madan Mallu (although a newcomer) has done a decent and good job of playing the role of a hero. His dialogue delivery is neat and pronunciation good. But his make-up is not upto the mark and he needs to improve it in his future movies". Madan Patel worked as a producer for the unreleased film Crazy Girls (2002), which was supposed to feature Shiva Rajkumar as a choreographer for one of the songs. He went on to star in Dayal Padmanabhan's Ok Saar Ok (2004). He directed and starred in Heegu Unte (2008), which got embroiled in controversy after he pointed a gun at a news photographer. He also directed Yarivaanu, based on the life of Nithyananda. The film, which was initially titled Satyanandha, also faced with controversy after Nithyananda filed a defamation suit. A Telugu remake was also partially shot and a Hindi remake was considered before both were dropped.

He was also active in politics and was the chief of the cultural cell of the Bharatiya Janatha Party. He acted in a movie Thamate directed by his son Mayur Patel. The film began production in 2019.

== Personal life ==
His brother is composer Shivamayya, who worked with him in Police Officers (2002). His son Mayur Patel collaborated with him in several films.

== Filmography ==
Year	Work	Credited as			Notes	Ref.
Year	Work	Director	Writer	Producer	Notes	Ref.
1994	Indian		Lyrics			
2002	Police Officers		Story			
2004	OK Saar OK		Story	Yes		
2005	Love Story			Yes		
2007	Ninade Nenapu	Yes	Yes			
2008	Heegu Unte	Yes	Yes	Yes		
2013	Yaarivanu	Yes	Yes	Yes		

=== As an actor ===
Year	Title	Role	Notes	Ref.
1993	Lovers			
1999	Garuda			
2000	Andhra Hendthi			
2001	Mysore Huli			
2002	Police Officers	Naganna		
2004	Ok Saar Ok			
2008	Heegu Unte	Annaiah		
2013	Yaarivanu			
2020	Rajeeva	Chief Minister	Guest appearance	
2024	Thamate			

== Discography ==
As composer

- Dampathiyaru (1983)
- Lovers (1993)
- Indian (1994)
- Heegu Unte (2008)
- Yaarivanu (2013)
