= Love Story (2005 film) =

2005 Indian Kannada-language film

- DVD cover
- Directed by: Bharathi Kannan
- Screenplay by: Bharathi Kannan
- Story by: K. Balachander
- Produced by: Madan Patel
- Starring: Mayur Patel; Tanu Roy
- Cinematography: Mathew Rajan
- Music by: S. A. Rajkumar
- Production company: Media International
- Release date: 26 November 2005
- Country: India
- Language: Kannada

Love Story is a 2005 Indian Kannada-language romantic drama film directed by Bharathi Kannan. The film stars Mayur Patel and Tanu Roy. This film is a remake of Maro Charitra (1978) and is about the love between a Hindi man and Kannada woman. The film was dubbed in Tamil as Uyir Ullavare.

== Cast ==
- Mayur Patel as Ram
- Tanu Roy as Swapna
- Srinagara Kitty
- Komal
- Ramesh Bhat
- Chitra Shenoy
- Pramila Joshai
- Nizhalgal Ravi
- Livingston
- Vindhya

== Production ==
This was the second venture of Madan Patel's Media International after the unreleased film Crazy Girls (2002). The filming was held at Malpe, Udupi, St Mary’s Island, Karwar, Kumta, Gokarna and Honnavar.

== Soundtrack ==
The music composed by S. A. Rajkumar with lyrics by K. Kalyan except where noted. The song "Nanna Ninna" is based on "Tere Mere Beech" from Ek Duuje Ke Liye.

- "Nanna Ninna Prema Geethe" (female) - K. S. Chitra
- "Mayagathi Mayagathi" - Mayur Patel, Nanditha
- "Hagulu Unte Suryanige" - Hariharan, K. S. Chitra
- "Nanna Ninna Prema Geethe" - Rajesh Krishnan
- "Gillala Gillala" - Hemanth, Shamitha Malnad (lyrics by V. Nagendra Prasad)
- "Yaare Neenu Cheluve" - Rajesh Krishnan, Shamitha Malnad

== Reception ==
K. N. Venkatasubba Rao of The Hindu wrote that "Though Mayur Patel has given his best as the hero, it is Srinagar Kitty as the villain who succeeds in registering his histrionic potential on a par with those artistes who played that role in original Telugu and Hindi films". R. G. Vjayasarathy of Rediff.com said that "Being a faithful adaptation, some sequences of the film are well-narrated. But if outstanding performances were one of the main features of the original, except for a few artists like Mayur Patel, Komal and Pramila Joshai, the others fail to deliver in this remake". A critic from Viggy said that "If you watch Love Story without comparing it with its original (Kamal's performance or Balachandar's direction), you surely will enjoy the film and those melodious songs".
