= Gunna (film) =

- Directed by: Dwarki
- Produced by: Sa Ra Govindu
- Starring: Mayur Patel; Chaitra Hallikeri
- Cinematography: Sundarnath Suvarna
- Edited by: Nagendra Urs
- Music by: Mahesh
- Release date: 12 May 2005
- Country: India
- Language: Kannada

Gunna is a 2005 Indian Kannada-language romantic action drama film directed by Dwarki featuring Mayur Patel and Chaitra Hallikeri in the lead roles. The film features background score and soundtrack composed by Mahesh. The film was released on 12 May 2005.

== Cast ==
- Mayur Patel as Shambhu
- Chaitra Hallikeri
- Rangayana Raghu as Sharma
- Bhavya
- Ramesh Bhat
- Tulasi
- Petrol Prasanna
- Ponnambalam
- Coffee Raghavendra
- Sudeep (guest appearance)

== Soundtrack ==
Soundtrack was composed by Mahesh. The audio was launched on 21 February 2005 at Malleswaram Club.

Gunna

Soundtrack album by Mahesh
- Genre: Feature film soundtrack
- Language: Kannada
- Label: Ashwini Audio

No.	Title	Singer(s)	Length
1.	"Kicha Haadabeku"	Badri
2.	"Hudugaa"	Chetan, Anuradha Sriram
3.	"Run"	Dwarki, Chaitra H. G.
4.	"Jana Gana Mana"	Rajesh
5.	"O My Love"	Rajesh, K. S. Chithra
6.	"Suryanannu"	Hemanth, Chaitra H. G.
7.	"Tuntanu Yaaro"	Hemanth, Malathi

== Reception ==
R. G. Vijayasarathy rated the film two-and-a-half out of five stars and wrote that "Gunna could have been a better film if the director Dwarki had taken strains to work hard on the script." A critic from Rediff.com wrote that "Dwarki could have made the script more racy. He has lost a good opportunity to make Gunna enjoyable." A critic from Viggy wrote that "Gunna is a routine fare and has nothing special to offer!"
