= Slum (film) =

- Soundtrack album cover
- Directed by: M. Mahesh Kumar
- Screenplay by: M. Mahesh Kumar
- Story by: M. Mahesh Kumar
- Produced by: P. Murthy
- Starring: Mayur Patel; Neha Patel; P. Murthy; Achyuth Kumar
- Cinematography: Selvam
- Edited by: Harish Kodpadi
- Music by: Ashley Mendonca
- Distributed by: Sagar Films
- Release date: 1 November 2013 (India)
- Running time: 142 minutes
- Country: India
- Language: Kannada

Slum is a 2013 Indian Kannada-language crime film directed by M. Mahesh Kumar. It stars Mayur Patel, Neha Patil, P. Murthy and Disha Poovaiah in pivotal roles. The film is based on a real-life crime that occurred in Bangalore.

== Cast ==
- Mayur Patel as Lucky
- Neha Patel as Usha
- P. Murthy as Surya
- Achyuth Kumar as Swamy
- Disha Poovaiah
- Gururaj Hosakote
- Cheluvaraj P.
- Patre Nagaraj
- Harish Rai
- Shobh Raj
- Shiva Manju

== Soundtrack ==
Slum

Soundtrack album by B. R. Hemanth Kumar
- Released: 28 September 2012
- Genre: Feature film soundtrack
- Length: 23:15
- Label: Anand Audio

The music for the soundtrack was composed by B. R. Hemanth Kumar and the background music for the film was scored by the duo Ashley-Abhilash. The album has five soundtracks.

No.	Title	Singer(s)	Length
1.	"Belli Belli"	Rajesh Krishnan, Archana Ravi	5:14
2.	"Jokeye Nannu Balliya (Remix)"	Archana Ravi	3:03
3.	"Addade Haaku Maga"	Chethan	4:39
4.	"Saleo Saleo"	Anuradha Bhat, Chethan	4:45
5.	"Yaaro Yaaro"	Fayaz Khan	5:34
Total length:			23:15

== Critical reception ==
Slum received generally mixed response from critics upon its theatrical release. G. S. Kumar of The Times of India gave the film a rating of two out of four and wrote, "The movie is full of bloodshed and murders. While Mayur Patel has shown some maturity, P Murthy has a long way to go. This is not the right movie for Neha Patil or Disha Poovaiah to prove their acting talent. Music by BR Hemanthkumar has a couple of catchy tunes."
