= Police Officers (film) =

- Directed by: Anand P. Raju
- Screenplay by: M. S. Ramesh; R. Rajashekhar
- Story by: Madan Mallu
- Produced by: M. Shivashankar
- Starring: Charan Raj; Thriller Manju
- Cinematography: S. Manohar
- Edited by: S. Prasad
- Music by: Shivamaya
- Production company: Mayur Films
- Release date: 3 May 2002
- Running time: 132 minutes
- Country: India
- Language: Kannada
- Budget: Rs 0.6 million

Police Officers is a 2002 Indian Kannada-language action drama film directed by Anand P. Raju, starring Charan Raj and Thriller Manju in lead roles.

== Plot ==
William Stuart and Rosna Barker visit the Vidhana Soudha and see a procession of auto rickshaw drivers worshipping Goddess Annamadevi. While leaving the procession, Stuart and Barker go to eat a small restaurant in Chamarajpet although Barker isn't feeling well. Due to her pain, they both leave the restaurant when Stuart gets attacked by four men who also disturb Barker as she gets on an auto rickshaw. She was raped by the auto driver. Stuart's corpse is discovered by a man near a train track. Barker goes to the Vijayanagar police station and based on her retellings of the incident, they try to nab the culprit. She initially doesn't remember who her rapist was leading her to falsely identify her rapist as innocent. A fictitious sub-plot involves Naganna trying to stop a young man from selling his girlfriend into prostitution.

== Cast ==
- Charan Raj as Inspector Jayasimha
- Thriller Manju as Inspector Dinakar Senani
- Madan Mallu as Naganna, auto rikshaw driver
- Shobaraj as Nagesh, auto rikshaw driver
- Karibasavaiah as auto rikshaw driver
- Abhishek
- Joe Simon
- Dingri Nagaraj
- Michael Madhu as beggar
- Mimicry Dayanand as beggar
- M. S. Karanth as doctor
- Shailaja Somashekar
- Pushpa Swamy
- Lillen Guildberg as William Stuart
- Clara as Rosna Barker

== Production ==
"It was the experience of a lifetime. [...] I am sure we will never get the opportunity to act in another Indian film! It was all great fun. [...] I never expected to feel all I did when I acted in the film. I understood, in a very personal manner, for the first time, the emotional trauma women victims go through with an attack of this kind"

— Lillen Guildberg on the film, 2002

The film is based on two different incidents that happened on the same night when a British couple visited Bangalore in December 1996: four men stole money and killed William Stuart and his girlfriend, Rosna Barker, was raped by an auto rickshaw driver. Madan Mallu, who wrote the film's story, also linked it to a similar incident that occurred in Chennai.

Mallu chose Anand P. Raju as the director since he had worked on several police-based movies. To brief himself on the case, Mallu asked several of his friends that were police officers about the case apart from Bangalore police officers B. B. Ashok Kumar and Bawa. Charan Raj and Thriller Manju played police officers investigating the case and Shobaraj played the rapist. Mallu's friend advertised in London for the roles of the British couple before finding the student couple Lillen Goldberg and Clara, who had experience in theatre. They shot their portions in the first 18-day schedule in Bangalore. Goldberg reportedly felt distressed after watching Clara's acting in the rape scene.

== Soundtrack ==
The music was composed by Shivamayya, Mallu's brother.

Track listing
No.	Title	Lyrics	Singer(s)	Length
1.	"Chamku Gimaku"	S. Manjunath Rao	Shivamaya, Sujatha Mohan, Sahil	4:39
2.	"Hosa Hudugi"	S. Manjunath Rao	Shivamaya, Sowmya Rao, Rajesh Krishnan	4:54
3.	"Namamma Annamma"	S. Manjunath Rao	Shivamaya, Rajesh Krishnan	5:39
4.	"Police Officers"	D. Bharat	Shivamaya, Ravi Raj, Jony, Murali, Sahil	5:11
5.	"Soundarya Naachide"	S. Manjunath Rao	Shivamaya, Rajesh Krishnan, Sujatha Mohan	4:55
Total length:				25:18

== Box office ==
The film was a box office success running well into its second week.
