= Upendra filmography =

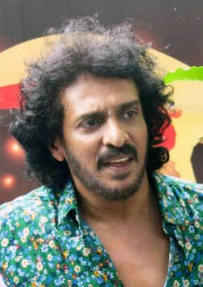
Upendra in 2019

Upendra is an Indian actor and director known primarily for his work in Kannada cinema. He began his career writing dialogues and lyrics for soundtrack in Kannada films. He then started out as a director making his debut in 1992 with Tharle Nan Maga. In a career spanning over 25 years, he has directed 10 films and acted in over 60 films.

== Filmography ==
Key
†	Denotes films that have not yet been released

=== As an actor ===
- Note: all films are in Kannada, unless otherwise noted.

Year	Title	Roles	Notes
1989	Anantana Avantara	Kamadeva	Cameo appearance
1989	Love Maadi Nodu	Doctor	Cameo appearance
1991	Ajagajantara	Groom	Cameo appearance
1993	Shhh!	Fake Police officer	Also director; Cameo appearance
1995	Om	Deena	Also director Voiceover for Kote Prabhakar
1995	Operation Antha	Bystander	Also director; Cameo appearance
1997	Omkaram	Narrator in the first scene	Telugu film; also director Voiceover for Kote Prabhakar
1998	A	Surya	Also director
1998	Kanyadanam	Venkat	Telugu film
1999	Upendra	Naanu	Also director
2000	Preethse	Chandru	
2000	Oke Maata	Sooryam	
2001	Raa	Sridhar	
2002	Neethone Vuntanu	Ravi	Telugu film
2002	H_{2}O	Udayashankar Gowda	Kannada-Tamil bilingual film
2002	Super Star	Ricky / Deependra (Note: Upendra played dual roles in the film.)	
2002	Nagarahavu	Ajay	
2002	Naanu Naane	Raja	
2002	Hollywood	Upendra / Surendra / Robot US47 (Note: Upendra played triple roles in the film.)	
2003	Kutumba	Vijay	
2003	Rakta Kanneeru	Mohan	
2003	Gokarna	Sidda	
2004	Omkara	Sathya	
2005	Gowramma	Venkat Swamy	
2005	News	Guru	
2005	Auto Shankar	Shankar	
2006	Uppi Dada M.B.B.S.	Rao Bahaddur Upendra	
2006	Thandege Thakka Maga	Sathya	
2006	Aishwarya	Abhishek Hegde	
2007	Parodi	Vijay	
2007	Masti	Siddappaji	
2007	Toss	Neelakanta	Telugu film
2007	Anatharu	Rudra	
2007	Lava Kusha	Chakri	
2008	Satyam	Manickavel	Tamil-Telugu bilingual film
2008	Salute	Prathap Rudra	Tamil-Telugu bilingual film
2008	Buddhivanta	Panchamrutha (Note: Upendra played seven different roles in the film, namely: Joseph Fernandez, Panchamrutha, Zakir Hussain, Vijay Mittal, Samarasimha Reddy, Ranjaneesh Swamy and Shyam Prasad.)	Seven roles
2008	Mast Maja Maadi	Himself	Cameo appearance
2009	Dubai Babu	Babu	
2009	Rajani	Rajani	
2010	Super	Subhash Chandra Gandhi	Also director
2011	Shrimathi	Raj Kumar	
2011	Maryade Ramanna	Cycle (voice)	Voice role
2012	Aarakshaka	Arun / Vishnu	
2012	Katari Veera Surasundarangi	Upendra / Mohan / Mass Manava Temporary Yama	
2012	Godfather	Shiva / Ajay / Vijay	
2012	Kalpana	Raghava	
2013	Topiwala	Basak	
2014	Brahma	Brahma	
2014	Super Ranga	Sriranga	
2015	Shivam	Basavanna / Alexander	
2015	S/O Satyamurthy	Devaraj Naidu	Telugu film
2015	Uppi 2	Naanu / Neenu	Also director
2016	Kalpana 2	Raghava / Jade Shivu	
2016	Mukunda Murari	Mukunda	
2017	Upendra Matte Baa	Upendra / Surendra	
2019	I Love You	Santosh	
2022	Home Minister	Renuka Prasad	
2022	Ghani	Vikramaditya	Telugu film
2023	Kabzaa	Arkeshwara	
2024	UI	Sathya / Kalki / Upendra Rao	Also director
2025	Coolie	Kaleesha	Tamil film
2025	Andhra King Taluka	"Andhra King" Surya Kumar	Telugu film
2025	45	Rayappa	
2026	Raktha Kashmira	Devendra / Bheema	Delayed release
TBA	Buddhivantha 2 †	TBA	Completed
TBA	Thrishulam †	TBA	Completed
TBA	Bhargava †	TBA	Filming
TBA	Guerrilla War †	TBA	Announced
TBA	Zombie Reddy Nxt Lvl †	TBA	Filming

=== As director, writer and lyricist ===
Year	Film	Credited as			Notes
Year	Film	Director	Writer	Lyricist	Notes
1989	Anantana Avantara			Yes	
1989	Love Maadi Nodu		Dialogue	Yes	
1990	Kaliyuga Krishna			Yes	
1990	Aata Bombata		Dialogue	Yes	
1991	Nanagoo Hendthi Beku		Dialogue	Yes	
1992	Sriramachandra		Dialogue		
1992	Tharle Nan Maga	Yes	Yes	Yes	Directorial Debut Film, Also choreographer
1993	Shhh!	Yes	Yes	Yes	
1995	Om	Yes	Yes		
1995	Operation Antha	Yes	Yes		
1997	Omkaram	Yes	Yes		Telugu film
1998	Swasthik	Yes	Yes	Yes	
1998	A	Yes	Yes	Yes	
1999	Upendra	Yes	Yes	Yes	
2001	Raa		Screenplay		Telugu film
2002	H2O		Yes	Yes	Kannada-Tamil bilingual
2002	Super Star		Yes		
2002	Hollywood		Yes	Yes	
2003	Rakta Kanneeru		Yes	Yes	
2005	Gowramma		Dialogue	Yes	
2005	Vishnu Sena			Yes	
2006	Uppi Dada M.B.B.S.		Dialogue	Yes	
2006	Aishwarya			Yes	
2007	Parodi			Yes	
2007	Lava Kusha			Yes	
2009	Dubai Babu			Yes	
2010	Super	Yes	Yes	Yes	
2012	Aarakshaka			Yes	
2012	Katari Veera Surasundarangi		Yes	Yes	
2013	Topiwala		Yes	Yes	
2015	Uppi 2	Yes	Yes	Yes	
2024	UI	Yes	Yes	Yes	Final Directorial film

=== As narrator ===
Year	Title	Notes	Ref.
2014	Ragini IPS		
2022	Ponniyin Selvan: I	Kannada dubbed version trailer	
2023	Ponniyin Selvan: II	Kannada dubbed version trailer	
