= Super Star (2002 film) =

- VCD cover
- Directed by: Nagathihalli Chandrashekhar
- Written by: Upendra
- Produced by: Hanumantha Inambar
- Starring: Upendra; Keerthi Reddy
- Cinematography: V R Krishna Kumar
- Edited by: T Shashikumar
- Music by: Hamsalekha
- Production company: Prince Productions
- Release date: 19 June 2002
- Running time: 130 minutes
- Country: India
- Language: Kannada
- Budget: ₹6.5 crores

Super Star is a 2002 Indian Kannada film written by Upendra Rao and directed by Nagathihalli Chandrashekhar. It stars Upendra as Dipendra, the crown prince of Nepal, alongside Keerthi Reddy in her Kannada debut. The film was initially conceived as a remake of the Hindi film Agni Sakshi, but was reworked following the Nepalese royal massacre, in which Dipendra killed nine members of the Nepalese royal family before committing suicide. The revised film's plot was inspired by Anton Chekhov's 1887 short story An Avenger, and features multiple endings.

Following its release, the movie was dubbed in Telugu as Stupid.

== Plot ==
Devayani is a librarian at the Karnataka State Central Library in Cubbon Park, Bangalore. She meets with a priest, hoping to find suitors for a potential marriage, but leaves in anger after the priest compares marrying her to a public hanging. Later that day, while returning from the library, she crashes into a car driven by a local singer named Ricky. Ricky falls in love with Devayani, who initially rejects him and his persistent efforts to win her over. However, Devayani is eventually persuaded by her cousin to apologize to him for the crash and for her harsh behavior. Hoping to cheer her up, Devayani's cousin invites her on a trip to Thailand. After being abandoned in Bangkok by her tour guide, Devayani is happily surprised to find Ricky there. The two spend the next few days sightseeing together, and Devayani realizes she has developed feelings for him.

One night, Devayani is ambushed at her hotel by an injured man wrapped in bandages. The man reveals himself to be Dipendra, the crown prince of Nepal, who believes Devayani is his lover. A terrified Devayani escapes and returns to India, while Dipendra is hospitalized. However, Dipendra soon leaves the hospital and travels to India in search of Devayani. In Bangalore, Dipendra meets Ricky and tells him that Devayani is his girlfriend. In a flashback, it is revealed that Dipendra and Devayani were previously engaged to be married. Dipendra's parents, who disapprove of the match due to Devayani's low social status, bribe an astrologer to warn Dipendra that the king and queen would die if he married Devayani. A distressed Dipendra returns home, only to catch his family celebrating the breakup at dinner, and kills them in a rage while a horrified Devayani flees to India. Ricky later learns that Dipendra's love is unreciprocated, and that Devayani is terrified of Dipendra due to his actions. Ricky tries to make Dipendra understand that Devayani does not love him, but all his initial attempts fail. Finally, Ricky advises Devayani to follow her heart. On a rainy night, Dipendra plucks his eyes out and cuts off his ears and limbs, dedicating them to Devayani. In emotional turmoil, Devayani runs to Dipendra, but the latter dies.

The next morning, Ricky takes Devayani on a jeep ride, and reveals that he is actually Dipendra, while the man who died the previous night was Ricky. Dipendra reveals that after he confessed his suicidal ideation to Ricky, Ricky asked what he would do if Devayani no longer loved him; the two then hatched a plot to exchange identities. Ricky, posing as Deependra, would fake his death so Deependra could confirm whether Devayani loved him or not. A horrified Devayani rebuffs Dipendra, stating that her heart now belongs to Ricky. She runs away, intending to commit suicide by jumping over a waterfall but is saved by Dipendra. A furious Devayani throws him into the water, but Dipendra climbs up the cliff face, reaching her just as Ricky arrives on the scene.

As Dipendra watches Ricky and Devayani embrace, four endings are presented. In the first, a jealous Dipendra fatally shoots Ricky, leaving an anguished Devayani to suffer alone. However, Dipendra remembers Ricky's kind nature and rejects this ending. In the second ending, an enraged Dipendra shoots and kills Devayani, only to regret his actions after realizing the earlier slaughter of his family has now amounted to nothing. In the third ending, Dipendra commits suicide, believing he is not worthy of being loved; he rejects this ending as cowardly. In the fourth and final ending, Dipendra spares Ricky and Devayani, and resolves to return to Nepal and face the consequences of his actions.

== Cast ==
- Upendra in a dual role as:
  - Dipendra, based on Dipendra of Nepal
  - Ricky, a local singer in Bangalore
- Keerthi Reddy as Devayani, based on Devyani Rana
- Kavitha as Aishwarya, based on Queen Aishwarya of Nepal
- Jayalakshmi as Devayani's aunt
- Nagathihalli Chandrashekhar as a tour guide
- V. Manohar as a psychiatrist

== Production ==
The producers of the film approached seven different directors working in the Kannada film industry, who all declined the script for various reasons before Nagathihalli Chandrashekhar was chosen. Chandrashekhar mentioned in an interview that, although he was credited as the director, he was not given creative freedom during shooting and production, and that Upendra was primarily responsible for the shooting and direction of the film.

== Soundtrack ==
The film's soundtrack was written and composed by Hamsalekha.

Title	Singers
"Bhakra Bhakra"	Hemanth Kumar, Sweta Malviya
"Rajkumar Rajkumar"	Hariharan
"Thagole Thagole"	Shankar Mahadevan
"Antu Antu"	Nanditha, Sonu Nigam
"Thumba Thumba"	Hariharan
"Problem"	Hemanth Kumar
"Bittaku Bittaku"	Adnan Sami

== Critical reception ==
The film received mixed reviews from critics upon its release. While the performances of the lead actors, soundtrack, background music, and other technical aspects were praised, the screenplay was criticized by both critics and the audience. Several reviewers noted that aspects of the film reflected Upendra's increased influence over the script and direction during production.

== Box office ==
=== Karnataka ===
Super Star had a strong opening at the Karnataka box office, and enjoyed significant commercial success during its opening weekend. However, ticket collections dropped steeply after the initial weeks, and the film's box office performance ultimately failed to live up to expectations. Super Star was a below-average grosser in Karnataka, and ran for only six weeks in cinemas within Bangalore. Compared to Upendra's earlier films, including A, Upendra, Preethse, and H2O, the movie was considered an average hit.

=== Andhra Pradesh ===
In 2003, a Telugu dub of Super Star was released in Andhra Pradesh, titled Stupid - O Pichi Vadi Prema Katha. The film enjoyed a strong opening weekend across Andhra Pradesh due to Upendra's Telugu fan base, which he gained due to the success of earlier box office hits Raa and Kanyadanam. Although Super Star was an average grosser in Karnataka, Stupid was a hit in Andhra Pradesh, running in cinemas for 100 days, and distributors in Andhra Pradesh earned significant profit from the movie.

== See also ==
- Upendra filmography
- List of Kannada-language films
- Cinema of India
- Kingdom of Nepal
