= Upendra (actor) =

Indian actor and filmmaker (born 1968)

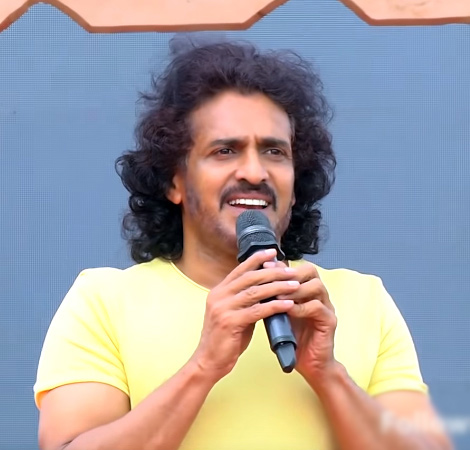
- Upendra in 2021
- Born: Upendra Rao; 18 September 1968 (age 58); Koteshwara, Kundapura taluk, Udupi District, Mysore State (present-day Karnataka), India
- Other name: Uppi
- Occupations: Actor; film director; producer; screenwriter; playback singer; lyricist; politician
- Years active: 1989–present
- Works: Full list
- Political party: Uttama Prajaakeeya Party
- Spouse: Priyanka Trivedi (m. 2003)
- Children: 2

Upendra Rao (born 18 September 1968) is an Indian actor, film director, screenwriter, lyricist, playback singer, producer and politician, known for his work in Kannada cinema. He has also worked in a few Telugu and Tamil films.

In 2017, Upendra joined the political party Karnataka Pragnyavanta Janata Paksha, before quitting the party in 2018 due to internal differences and formed another party named Uttama Prajaakeeya Party (UPP), which was based on the principles of Prajākīya (citizen-centric administration). He received an Honorary Doctorate from Angkor University in 2015.

He started his film career as a writer and an assistant director with actor and film director Kashinath. His first directorial venture was Tharle Nan Maga (1992). In the mid-1990s, Upendra directed Om (1995) which emerged as a blockbuster at the box office and became a cult classic film. He later made the film in Telugu as Omkaram. This was followed by A, in which he debuted as an actor. The film went to be a major success and catapulted him to new heights of fame. His next film was the psychological thriller Upendra (1999), which became a cult film. After a decade of acting, he returned to directing with Super, which was well-received critically and commercially.

Upendra is known for his works in films such as Preethse (2000), Super Star (2002), Kutumba (2002), Gokarna (2002), Hollywood (2002), Raktha Kanneeru (2003), Gowramma (2005), Aishwarya (2006), Anatharu (2007), Budhivanta (2008), Kalpana (2012), Godfather (2012), S/O Satyamurthy (2015), Uppi 2 (2015), I Love You (2019), UI (2024) and Coolie (2025).

== Early life ==
Upendra was born to Manjunath Rao and Anusuya in Bengaluru, on 18 September 1968. His father was from Thekkatte, Koteshwara, Kundapur Taluk, Udupi district in Karnataka, formerly Mysore State. He is the second son of his family, his older brother is Sudheendra Rao, who is an army officer. He obtained his Bachelor of Commerce degree from APS College of Commerce, Bangalore. During his time at the college, he participated in plays and often formed troupes with his friends. His association with actor and director Kashinath, a distant relative of his, began during his final year in college.

== Film career ==
=== Early years (1989–1999) ===
Upendra first appeared on screen making an appearance in Kashinath's 1989 comedy film, Anantana Avantara. He appeared as Lord Kamadeva in the song "Come On Come On Kaamanna". In Love Maadi Nodu starring Kashinath, he made a cameo appearance as a doctor. In Ajagajantara, directed by Kashinath, he made a cameo appearance. In his directorial debut, Shhh! (1993), Upendra made another cameo appearance, after being turned down multiple times by the film crew for his plea seeking an opportunity to act in a movie, he appears in the attire of a police officer barging into a film set to demonstrate his acting skills. In his 1995 directorial Operation Antha, he appears as a bystander and explains of India's ways to a complaining Mandakini (played by Sangeetha).

Upendra assisted filmmaker Kashinath in various departments apart from assisting in writing songs, dialogues, and screenplay for his films. He co-directed a film with Kashinath. Upendra started as a director with a typical Kashinath style comedy called Tharle Nan Maga in 1992. The film introduced famed comedian Jaggesh. It went on to be a success and has since achieved a cult following. Upendra directed a horror suspense thriller next called Shhh! in 1993. The film featured Kashinath and a young producer and actor, Kumar Govind. The film was a major box office success, and Upendra came out as an independent director.

Upendra's next film was a crime drama titled Om, (1995), which he wrote after being inspired by a real incident in the 1980s. Shiva Rajkumar played a gangster, Sathya, alongside other real-life gangsters who appeared in cameos. Prema played the female lead. The film's unique story-telling in the form of multiple flashback sequences supporting the plotline won critical praise and was also a major commercial success. This film too went on to attain cult status among Kannada audiences.

Upendra turned towards a project to direct an extended version of the 1981 film Antha and called it Operation Antha. The film had Ambareesh reprise his role from Antha as both Sushil Kumar and Kanwar Lal. The film was not very successful; it was also controversial for its taunts on some real-life political figures.

In 1997, Upendra directed A, through which he made a successful transition to acting. The film is about a love affair between a film director and an actress, in which the actress rejects the director, causing him to become an alcoholic. It further led to the discovery of conspiracies on a reshoot by the director, who vowed revenge. There were rumors that it was Upendra's own story, and the actress in the film portrayed his protege Prema. This added to the film's popularity and it broke many box office records upon release and went on to become one of the highest grossing Kannada films of its time. The film had a 175-day run in Karnataka was also dubbed to Telugu, and repeated its success in Andhra Pradesh too, where it had a 100-day run. The film won accolades from Bollywood personalities like Amitabh Bachchan and Anil Kapoor. Upendra was now a big name in Kannada cinema and was also popular in Andhra Pradesh.

In 1998, Upendra directed and starred in A, which was his fifth film as a director but his first lead role as a hero. The film had a 175-day run and became a trend-setting blockbuster in Karnataka, with its Telugu dubbed version running for 100 days in Andhra Pradesh. Around this time, he received an offer from Amitabh Bachchan Corporation to make a film for them, which did not materialize. Due to Upendra's newly found popularity in Telugu, Telugu director E. V. V. Satyanarayana cast him in the 1998 Telugu film Kanyadanam alongside Srikanth and Rachana, which also became a commercial success. In 1999 Upendra again directed and starred in his self-titled film Upendra which starred Bollywood actress Raveena Tandon. The film went on to become a bigger hit than A, both in Karnataka as well as in Andhra Pradesh. The film had a 200 days run in Karnataka and 100 days run in Andhra Pradesh.

Upendra's next movie was Swasthik with lead Raghavendra Rajkumar, which was released in 1998. The film performed averagely at the box office but critically well received.

In 1999, Upendra made a self-titled film, Upendra. Upendra acted in this film as the unnamed protagonist (or antagonist) Naanu (I or Myself). The film starred three heroines: Damini, Prema, and Bollywood actress Raveena Tandon. Naanu was an arrogant character and was very demeaning towards women, bordering on misogyny; which led to a lot of criticism on the film. However, the film broke many box office records and went on to be a much bigger hit than A in both Karnataka and Andhra Pradesh. The film had a 200-day run in Karnataka, and its Telugu version had a 100-day run in Andhra Pradesh. Upendra was now not only a remarkably successful director, but also a big star with a large fan base in Karnataka and Andhra Pradesh. Since then, Upendra gave up directing and concentrated more on his acting career.

=== Acting career (2000-2009) ===
In 2000, Upendra starred opposite Bollywood actress Sonali Bendre in the psychological thriller Preethse which was a remake of Bollywood film Darr. Preethse became Upendra's third consecutive blockbuster that ran for 175 days. With three back-to-back highly received films, Upendra became well known in Karnataka and Andhra Pradesh. Due to the success of the Telugu dubbed versions of his Kannada films and Kanyadanam, he starred in the Telugu films Oke Maata, Raa and Neethone Vuntanu. Raa was a typical Upendra style film in which he plays a womanizing playboy. Upendra starred opposite his future wife Priyanka Trivedi for the first time in this film. While Raa written by him was a box office success, the other two films were box office failures causing Upendra to take a break from straight Telugu films.

In 2002, Upendra acted in less-received films such as H2O, Super Star, Hollywood, Nagarahavu and Naanu Naane for not meeting expectations and having average run at the box office.

From 2003 to 2005 he starred in 5 back-to-back films that each ran for 100 days such as Kutumba, Raktha Kanneeru, Gokarna, Gowramma, and Auto Shankar; all of which were well received at the box office. Only two films of Upendra in this time were received poorly: Omkara and News.

Upendra had a less successful phase from 2006 to 2009, as most of his films during this period went unnoticed at the box office such as Uppi Dada M.B.B.S., Tandege Takka Maga, Parodi, Masti, Toss (Telugu), Lava Kusha, Sathyam (Tamil), Dubai Babu and Rajini.

The only commercial well-received films he acted in during this period were the candy floss romantic comedy Aishwarya, which ran for 75 days, and the moderately successful Anatharu which ran for 70 days. Upendra received praise and critical acclaim for his performance in Anatharu.

Budhivanta, which was Upendra's only release in 2008, was considered as his big comeback. The film was declared a blockbuster and ran for 100 days; it became the top box office grosser of the year. Budhivanta's Telugu dub was also well-received and ran for 50 days in Andhra Pradesh.

=== Comeback as director and double roles (2010-2019) ===
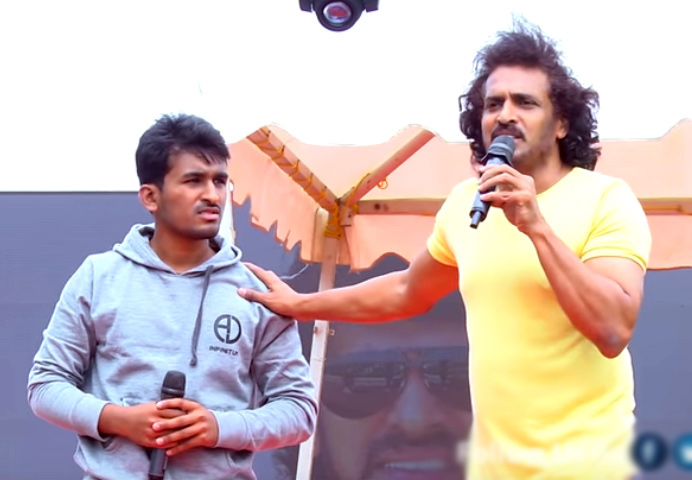
Upendra with a fan on stage during his visit to KLE Society's Law College, Bangalore, in 2019

2010 marked Upendra's comeback to directing after 10 years. After several ups and downs in his acting career, Upendra came back to direct and act in the 2010 film Super in which he starred alongside Tamil actress Nayantara and Tulip Joshi. The movie was released in a record number of theatres all over Karnataka and was also dubbed into Telugu and released in Andhra Pradesh. Super broke many box office records upon release and completing 175 days of the run, becoming one of the highest-grossing critically acclaimed Kannada films of 2010.

In 2011, Tamil actor Rajinikanth attended a private screening of Super in Bangalore. Rajinikanth watched the film along with Upendra and a couple of friends. "Upendra is a great actor and director. There is hardly anyone in Indian Cinema, who would think like him. Only he can think like that. I like watching Upendra's films, and this was no exception. If I get an opportunity and an impressive script, I'd like to act in a Upendra film in the future," said Rajini.

Upendra then starred in films like Shrimathi (2011) opposite his wife Priyanka Trivedi and Bollywood actress Celina Jaitly, and Aarakshaka (2012). In 2012, Upendra starred in several commercially successful films such as 3D fantasy film Katari Veera Surasundarangi which was well-received and became the second-highest-grossing film of the year, followed by Godfather which performed above average, and the horror-comedy film Kalpana which performed average at the box office.

Upendra's films from 2013 to 2015 such as Topiwala (2013), Brahma (2014), Super Ranga (2014) and Shivam (2015) performed poorly in theatres.

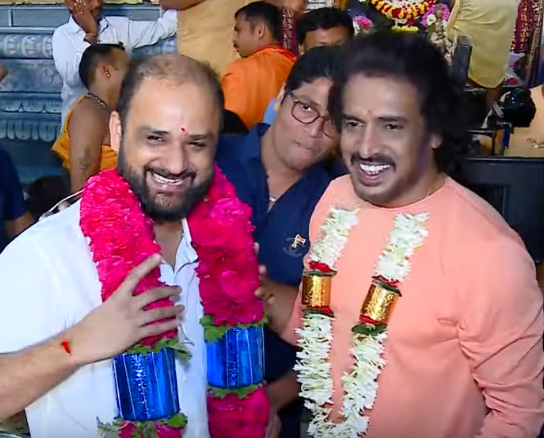
Film director Shashank, Upendra in 2019

In 2015, Upendra directed and starred in a sequel to his 1999 film Upendra, titled Uppi 2. As it was a sequel to Upendra and his comeback as a director after 5 years, expectations and the resulting hype was high before it released. The film was simultaneously released in Karnataka, Andhra Pradesh, and the US in over 600 theaters. Upon release, the film set records for the highest grossing opening day for a Kannada movie. Although the film got mixed responses because of its confusing storyline and screenplay, it was commercially successful and profitable with a 50-day theatrical run. It sold the second-highest number of tickets in online ticket sales on Bookmyshow among Kannada movies in 2015. It was also successful outside of India and became the second-highest-grossing Kannada film of all time in US.

In 2015, Upendra starred alongside Allu Arjun in the Telugu film S/O Satyamurthy that was directed by Trivikram Srinivas. The film was declared a hit, grossing ₹92 crores and netting over ₹60 crores at the global box office, becoming the seventh-highest-grossing Telugu film of all time worldwide.

In 2016, Upendra starred in a sequel to his earlier hit horror film Kalpana titled as Kalpana 2 which became an average grosser at the box office. He also starred along with Sudeep in the remake of Bollywood film OMG titled as Mukunda Murari, which became a box office success and had a 50-day run. In 2017, he starred in the remake of Soggade Chinni Nayana titled Upendra Matte Baa. N Arun Lokanath, who directed Upendra's critically-acclaimed H2O, is collaborating with the actor again after a gap of 15 years. In 2019, he starred in I Love You, which released to positive reviews.

=== 2022-present ===
In 2022, he starred in Home Minister and made a comeback to Telugu cinema with Ghani in a brief role.

In 2023, he starred in Kabzaa, which had a similar theme to the KGF series. Upendra launched his next directorial, UI (2024).

He also plays an extended cameo role in director Lokesh Kanagaraj's Coolie (2025) starring Rajinikanth, which marks his return to Tamil cinema after Satyam (2008) starring Vishal. He is starring alongside Shiva Rajkumar in Arjun Janya's directorial 45 (2025).

== Political career ==
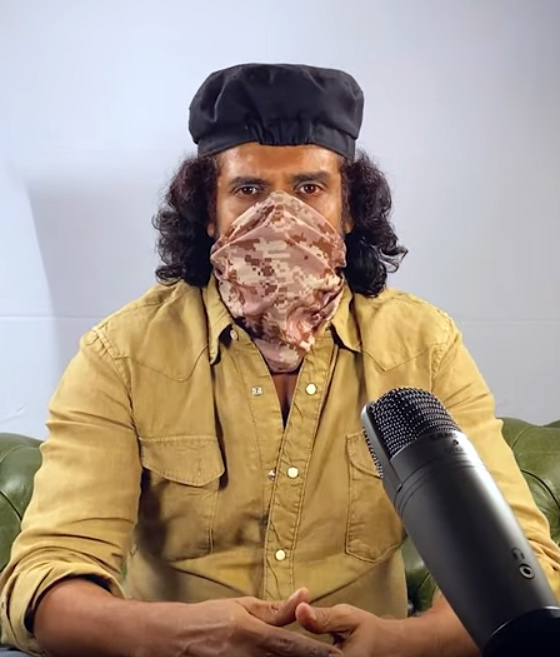
Upendra promoting his political party ′Uttama Prajaakeeya Party′

He started the political party Uttama Prajaakeeya Party in 2018, under the concept of "Prajaakeeya"—which represents the workers. Although he has strictly kept himself away from contesting in any elections, UPP had candidates across all the constituencies in Karnataka in the 2019 Lok Sabha Elections.

== Craft and style ==
Upendra's films have been praised and criticized for their unusual plotlines and screenplay. During a radio interview, Upendra expressed his disappointment at being labeled as a "different director" and explained that most of his directorial ventures deal with the things that he had undergone in his real life. He said, in regards to his non-linear narrative, that "when one wants to capture the upheavals in one's mind, it becomes a jumble. Our mind is like that, always confused."

The subject of the films coupled with Uppi's novel approach made headlines for mixed reasons. Upendra added that in his self-titled film he explored human nature which "ended with "Aham Brahmaasmi", where I wanted to say rise above I."

== Personal life ==
=== Family ===
On 14 December 2003, Upendra married actress and former Miss Kolkata Priyanka Trivedi, who first starred opposite him in the Telugu movie Raa and then in H2O. Upendra and his family now reside in Bengaluru.

=== Endorsements ===
Upendra has endorsed a number of brands. Upendra has been the brand ambassador of the United Breweries, Lunars Footwear, SK Super TMT, Royal Challengers Bangalore (replaced by Puneeth Rajkumar in IPL 3), Mavalli Tiffin Room (MTR), Bangalore Electricity Supply Company, Emani Navaratna Brand, Karnataka Milk Federation (Nandini), Udayavani News Daily.

== Discography ==
=== Playback singer ===
Year	Film	Song	Composer	Co-singer(s)	Notes
1999	Upendra	"Uppiganta Ruchi Bere Illa"	Gurukiran		
2002	H2O	"Bida Byada", "Dil Ilde Love"	Sadhu Kokila		
2002	Nagarahavu	"Yaaking Aadthiye"	Hamsalekha	Anuradha Sriram	
2003	Rakta Kanneeru	"Baa Baaro Rasika"	Sadhu Kokila	Sowmya Raoh	
2004	Omkara	"Othla Othla"	Gurukiran	Shamitha Malnad	
2006	Uppi Dada M.B.B.S.	"Makkar Maado Maliniye"	R. P. Patnaik		
2006	Uppi Dada M.B.B.S.	"M Andre"	R. P. Patnaik		
2006	Aishwarya	"Yella Okay Madhuve Yaake"	Rajesh Ramanath		
2007	Parodi	"Rowdy Mele"	Rajesh Ramanath		
2008	Budhivanta	"Chitranna"	Vijay Antony	Sangeetha Rajeshwaran	
2010	Super	"Sikkapatte Ishtapatte"	V. Harikrishna		
2011	Jogayya	"Thagalakonde"	V. Harikrishna	Priya Himesh	
2011	Jarasandha	"Pade Pade Phone-inalli"	V Harikrishna	Priya Himesh	
2012	Katari Veera Surasundarangi	"Muthinantha Muthondhu"	Harikrishna		
2013	Brindavana	"Oye Kalla"	Harikrishna	Indu Nagaraj	
2014	Jai Lalitha	"Thorisabedammi"	Sridhar V. Sambhram		
2014	Super Ranga	"Ondsali Avala"	Harikrishna		
2015	Krishna-Leela	"Phoneammangu Simmappangu"	Sridhar V.		
2015	Uppi 2	"Excuse Me Please"	Gurukiran		
2016	Kalpana 2	"H2O Kudidivni"	Arjun Janya	Aishwarya Rangarajan	
2016	Dombarata				Tulu film
2016	Mukunda Murari	"I Am God, God is Great"	Arjun Janya		
2019	I Love You	"Life Ene T20"	Dr. Kiran Thaotambyle	Chethan Naik, Vasushree Halemane	

== Awards and nominations ==
Year	Film	Award	Category	Result	Ref.
1999	A	Udaya Film Awards	Best Male Actor	Won	
1999	A	Udaya Film Awards	Best Director	Nominated	
1999	A	46th Filmfare Awards South	Best Director	Nominated	
2000	Upendra	47th Filmfare Awards South	Best Director	Won	
2000	Upendra	47th Filmfare Awards South	Best Film	Won	
2003	Nagarahavu	Udaya Film Awards	Best Male Actor	Won	
2003	Nagarahavu	50th Filmfare Awards South	Best Actor	Nominated	
2004	Raktha Kanneeru	Hello Gandhinagara Awards 2004	Best Actor	Won	
2004	Raktha Kanneeru	Hello Gandhinagara Awards 2004	Best Dialogue	Won	
2004	Raktha Kanneeru	51st Filmfare Awards South	Best Actor	Nominated	
2008	Anatharu	Suvarna Film Awards	Special Award For Performance	Won	
2008	Anatharu	55th Filmfare Awards South	Best Actor	Nominated	
2008	Anatharu	Udaya Film Awards	Best Male Actor	Nominated	
2009	Budhivanta	56th Filmfare Awards South	Best Actor	Nominated	
2011	Super	Udaya Film Awards	Best Screenplay	Won	
2011	Super	Udaya Film Awards	Best Director	Nominated	
2011	Super	Udaya Film Awards	Best Male Actor	Nominated	
2011	Super	Suvarna Film Awards	Favorite Director Award	Won	
2011	Super	Suvarna Film Awards	Favorite Film	Won	
2011	Super	58th Filmfare Awards South	Best Director	Nominated	
2011	Super	58th Filmfare Awards South	Best Actor	Nominated	
2011	Super	58th Filmfare Awards South	Best Playback Singer- Male for "Sikka Patte"	Nominated	
2012	Super	Karnataka State Film Awards	Karnataka State Film Award for Best Director	Won	
2012	Super	Karnataka State Film Awards	Karnataka State Film Award for Best Film	Won	
2012	Shrimathi	1st SIIMA Awards	Special Appreciation Award	Won	
2013	Kalpana	Udaya Film Awards	Best Male Actor	Won	
2013	Kalpana	Suvarna Film Awards	Best Male Actor	Nominated	
2013	Katariveera Surasundarangi	2nd SIIMA Award	Critics Award for Best Actor	Won	
2013	Godfather	Bangalore Times Film Awards	Best Male Actor in a Negative Role	Nominated	
2014	Topiwala	3rd SIIMA Awards	Best Actor	Nominated	
2016	S/O Satyamurthy	5th SIIMA Awards	Best Actor in a Supporting Role	Nominated	
2016	Uppi 2	5th SIIMA Awards	Best Film	Nominated	
2016	Uppi 2	5th SIIMA Awards	Best Director	Won	
2016	Uppi 2	5th SIIMA Awards	Best Actor	Nominated	
2025	UI	13th SIIMA Awards	Best Director	Won	

Other honours

- 2015 Honorary Doctorate from Angkor University

== See also ==
- List of actor-politicians
