= Naganna =

Indian film director and writer

B. Naganna
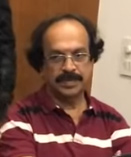
- B. Naganna (2019)
- Born: Karnataka, India
- Occupation(s): Film director, screenwriter
- Years active: 1994–present

B. Naganna is an Indian film director and writer working in Kannada cinema. He is the son of producer and distributor R. Lakshman.

After working as an associate director in the K. S. L. Swamy directorial Jimmy Gallu in 1982, Naganna debuted as a director through the film Samrat in 1994. His movies include O Premave (1999), Kotigobba (2001), Gokarna (2003), Vishnu Sena (2005) and Krantiveera Sangolli Rayanna (2012). For the historical drama, Sangolli Rayanna, he won the Best director award at the Times of India film awards.

Naganna headed the panel of the Karnataka State Film Awards for the year 2015.

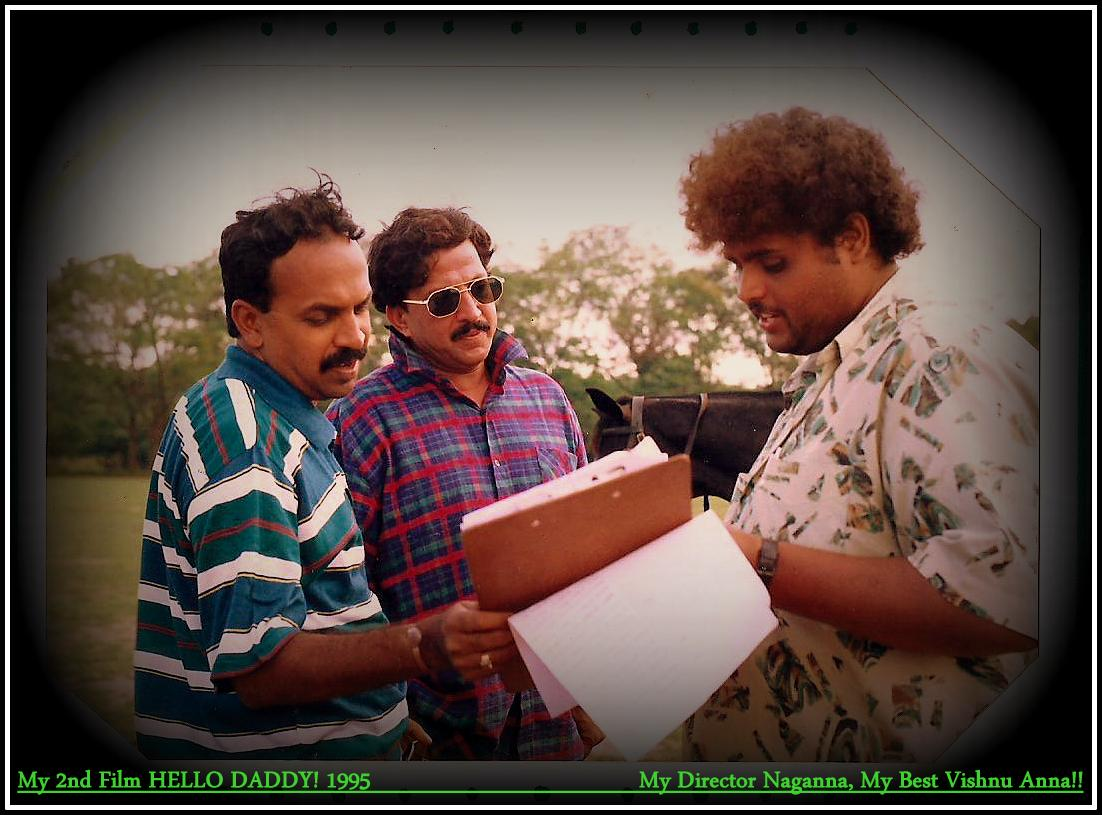
Naganna (left), Vishnuvardhan (center), Ravi Srivatsa (right), during a filmshoot

== Filmography ==
Year	Title	Note
1982	Jimmy Gallu	As associate director
1994	Samrat	Debut direction
1995	Lady Police	
1996	Hello Daddy	
1997	Lady Commissioner	
1999	O Premave	
2000	Soorappa	
2001	Kotigobba	
2001	Amma Ninna Tholinalli	
2002	Prema Khaidi	
2003	Gokarna	
2003	Kutumba	
2004	Chappale	
2005	Vishnu Sena	
2005	Gowramma	
2008	Bandhu Balaga	
2009	Dubai Babu	
2012	Sangolli Rayanna	Bangalore Times of India Award for Best Director; Nominated, Filmfare Award for Best Director – Kannada; Nominated, SIIMA Award for Best Director – Kannada
2019	Kurukshetra	
2019	Gimmick	
