= Nagarahavu (2002 film) =

Naagarahavu
- Film poster
- Directed by: S. Murali Mohan
- Written by: Robin Bhatt; Akash Khurana; Javed Siddiqui
- Screenplay by: S. Murali Mohan
- Produced by: Rockline Venkatesh
- Starring: Upendra; Jyothika; Ambika; Sadhu Kokila
- Cinematography: R. Giri
- Edited by: Shyam
- Music by: Hamsalekha
- Production company: Rockline Productions
- Release date: 22 August 2002
- Running time: 158 minutes
- Country: India
- Language: Kannada

Nagarahavu (transl. Cobra) is a 2002 Indian Kannada-language psychological thriller film directed by S. Murali Mohan, starring Upendra and Jyothika. A remake of the 1993 Hindi film Baazigar, it shocked its Karnataka audience with an unexpected violation of the standard Kannada film industry formula, with a morally ambiguous hero. this was Upendra's second film portraying a negative role after his earlier blockbuster Preethse, a remake of the 1993 Hindi film Darr. In both remakes, Upendra played Shah Rukh Khan's roles. It marked Jyothika's debut in Kannada film industry. For his work in the film, Upendra won the Udaya Film Award for Best Male Actor along with Jyothika for her Best Female Actor Award.

== Plot ==
Based on Ira Levin's 1953 novel A Kiss Before Dying, it is a contemporary thriller about revenge. The main character is Ajay Sharma (Upendra). His father, Vishwanath Sharma (Srinath), once owner of a great business empire, was defrauded by Ashok Patel (Rajeev), a trusted employee in Vishwanath's company. The Sharma family is ousted from their own company and loses everything they owned. Soon afterwards, Ajay's father and his young baby sister die due to illness, unable to buy medicine because of their destitute state. His mother is now suffering from mental illness and memory loss. Driven over the edge, Ajay becomes obsessed with killing Patel and destroying his family.

Ajay begins dating Keerthi Patel (Jyothika), the daughter of the owner of the Patel business empire. They meet secretly as her father would not approve of a poor son-in-law. Meanwhile, the younger daughter Prema Patel (Jyothika, dual role) travels with her father Madan Chopra to Madras (now Chennai), for Ashok's final kart race before he retires permanently. Ashok has never lost before, but comes across Vicky Despande (Ajay Sharma in a disguise with brown contact lenses). Vicky allows Ashok to win by slowing at the last corner and tells him that he couldn't beat his "guru". Vicky then charms Prema by saying that he lost the race as he couldn't break the heart of a beautiful girl. Thus his ploy of winning in spite of losing (meaning Nagarahaavu) succeeds as he wins Prema's heart. This way, he manages to date both Keerthi and Prema simultaneously using different identities.

Ajay is (incidentally) photographed lurking outside the birthday party of Keerthi by one of her friends. Later, Ashok Patel arranges for Keerthi to be married off to another business family. Keerthi is heartbroken, and Ajay decides that they will write identical suicide notes and commit suicide. After they each write their suicide notes, he tells her that the suicide note was just a test. He says that only cowards commit suicide and destroys his note, while keeping Keerthi's. They decide to marry secretly the next day. When they arrive, the registrar is closed, so they go up to the roof of the building for sightseeing. He makes her sit on the parapet and tells her the truth about himself, after which he throws her to her death from the rooftop of the building. He then posts the suicide note and leaves, but arrives later (as Vicky) with Prema. He helps the Patel family with the funeral. The letter written by Keerthi implies that she has committed suicide, and the murder investigation is closed. Prema cannot believe that, and asks her father to re-open the case. However, he disagrees, saying he doesn't want to lose his reputation due to Keerthi's affair. Prema then asks Arjun (Rockline Venkatesh), who is her former classmate and a current police inspector, for help.

Prema tries to investigate Keerthi's death, however her attempts prove unsuccessful. Rajesh, Keerthi's college friend, offers to help her, but is brutally killed by Vicky. As Vicky forces him to sign a suicide note before hanging him, Arjun thinks that Rajesh must have been in love with Keerthi and hence her murderer. Later, Prema and Vicky meet Keerthi's college friend, Sangeetha, who becomes suspicious of him. When she finds out that he was Keerthi's boyfriend back in college, she calls the Sharma household during Vicky's and Prema's engagement party. Vicky intercepts the phone and impersonates Ashok Patel, and then arrives at her place. He strangles her, then fits her body in a suitcase and throws it in the river.

Vicky vows to destroy Ashok Patel's confiscate his assets and throw him out of his office and onto the street, just like Patel did many years ago to Ajay's father. Patel needs to go on a business trip, and knowing that Vicky's his soon to be son-in-law, gives Vicky the power of attorney. Vicky does a carbon copy of the previous montage of Patel, and within days seizes everything. One day in a club Vicky takes Prema to calm her mind, where they meet Ajay's childhood friend, who greets him as Ajay. While Vicky tries to ignore him, Prema tells the man that he is mistaken, and that Ajay is Vicky Despande. Ajay's friend repeatedly tries to remind Vicky (who is actually Ajay) about their friendship. Vicky feels trapped and tries to get out of the mess by abusing him and gets in a scuffle with him. Prema visits Ajay's friend and the whole truth is revealed to her.

When Patel returns, Vicky reveals himself as Vishwanath Sharma's son Ajay and gives him the exact sendoff that Patel did 15 years ago. Prema finds Ajay's home address, and finds out his real identity. Ajay comes in and they argue about Keerthi's murder. Ajay wins her over by telling her the history of their two families. Ashok Patel charges in with a group of thugs and shoots Ajay in the shoulder before he is severely beaten and wounded. Ajay's mother is then knocked unconscious trying to defend Ajay. This prompts him to recover and fight Ashok and his gang all alone. Patel eventually picks up a stake and stabs Ajay. However, Ajay manages to impale him with the same stake by walking into him, and they jump off a small cliff. Patel dies, Ajay tells his mother that he has reclaimed what is rightfully theirs. Mrs. Sharma is cured of her illness, but is beset by sorrow, along with Prema crying beside her, because her father cheated her, as Ajay moves in with his mother and Prema.

== Cast ==
- Upendra as Ajay Sharma
- Jyothika in dual roles as Keerthi Patel and Prema Patel
- Rajeev as Ashok Patel
- Ambika as Ajay's mother
- Sadhu Kokila
- Doddanna
- Rockline Venkatesh
- Srinath as Vishwanath Sharma
- Shivadhwaj
- Shanker Bhat
- Mandeep Roy
- Suchendra Prasad
- Rajesh Nataranga

== Production ==
The film was launched on 24 July 2001 at Kanteerava Studios.

Rockline Venkatesh, producer of the film, organised Nagarahavu Cricket Cup, a celebrity cricket match to promote the film's release. The event was held at KSCA Stadium, Bangalore. Cast and crew of the film, including Upendra, and other celebrities of the Kannada film Industry like Vishnuvardhan, Ambareesh, Shivrajkumar, Puneeth Rajkumar, Devaraj, Ramesh Arvind, Bharathi Vishnuvardhan, Anu Prabhakar, Tara, and many others took part in the match, which was attended by thousands of fans.

== Soundtrack ==
The music for the movie was composed by Hamsalekha.

Title	Singers
"Yaking Adthiye"	Upendra, Anuradha Sriram
"Havina Dwesha"	S. P. Balasubrahmanyam
"Edhe Chippinalli"	Chithra, Rajesh Krishnan
"I Want To Say"	Rajesh Krishnan, Anuradha Sriram
"Ammage Bitte"	S. P. Balasubrahmanyam
"Kolegara"	Hemanth Kumar

== Release and reception ==
A critic from Chitraloka.com wrote that "A gripping story line holds lot of attention in the second half. That does not mean to say the first half is not interesting. It is in the fag end of the first half you will know the tricks in the mind of the hero". Indiainfo wrote "Rockline has lavishly. Giri's photography is catchy. Hamsalekha's songs are also catchy. Upendra is free from his gimmicks. He has some scope for acting in the second half. Jyothika's work is beautifully extracted in the double roles. Ambica has no mention in any way."

== Awards ==
=== Won ===
- Udaya Film Award for Best Male Actor – Upendra
- Udaya Film Award for Best Female Actor – Jyothika

=== Nominations ===
- Filmfare Award for Best Actor – Kannada – Upendra
- Filmfare Award for Best Actress – Kannada – Jyothika
