= O Premave (1999 film) =

- DVD cover
- Directed by: Naganna
- Written by: Jayanth C. Paranjee
- Based on: Premante Idera (1998)
- Produced by: Jai Jagadish; Vijayalakshmi Singh
- Starring: V. Ravichandran; Rambha; Srihari; Srinivasa Murthy
- Cinematography: G. S. V. Seetharam
- Edited by: Suresh Urs
- Music by: V. Ravichandran
- Production company: Sri Vaibhav Nidhi Productions
- Release date: 12 November 1999
- Running time: 148 minutes
- Country: India
- Language: Kannada

O Premave is a 1999 Indian Kannada-language romance drama film directed by Naganna. The film stars V. Ravichandran along with Rambha, Doddanna and Srinivasa Murthy in prominent roles. Telugu actor Srihari made his debut in Kannada cinema with this film.

The film is a remake of Telugu film Premante Idera (1998) directed by Jayanth Paranjee and starred Venkatesh and Preity Zinta. The film was produced by Jai Jagadish and Vijayalakshmi Singh and the music was composed by V. Ravichandran.

The film upon release met with very good positive response at the box-office.

== Cast ==
- V. Ravichandran as Raja
- Rambha as Prema
- Srinivasa Murthy
- Srihari
- Sadhu Kokila
- Doddanna
- Keerthi
- Mandya Ramesh
- Umashree
- Bhavyasri Rai
- Kashi
- Bank Janardhan
- Sundar Raj
- Mandeep Roy

== Production ==
A song sequence was filmed at New Zealand.

== Soundtrack ==
All the songs are composed and scored by V. Ravichandran. The lyrics are written by K. Kalyan

| Sl No | Song title | Singer(s) | Lyrics |
|---|---|---|---|
| 1 | "Jaana Jaga Jaana" | S. P. Balasubrahmanyam | K. Kalyan |
| 2 | "O Premave" | K. J. Yesudas | K. Kalyan |
| 3 | "O Premave" | K. S. Chitra | K. Kalyan |
| 4 | "Cheluvinoora Chendagathi" | Hariharan, Anuradha Sriram | K. Kalyan |
| 5 | "O Jambada Koli" | Rajesh Krishnan, Suma Shastry | K. Kalyan |
| 6 | "Yaravva Ivalu Cheluve" | L. N. Shastry | K. Kalyan |
| 7 | "Uppu Thinda Mele" | S. P. Balasubrahmanyam, K. S. Chithra | K. Kalyan |

== Reception ==
Indian Express wrote "[..] director Naganna, who is trying his hand at direction after a long gap, may not be assured of success. During the first half of the film, especially, the story moves at a snail's pace [..] The only consolation is Seetharam’s photography and Umasri, Kashi and Sunderraj’s comedic talents."
