= Kutumba =

- Directed by: Naganna
- Written by: K. Nanjunda [Dialogues]
- Screenplay by: Vijaya Bapineedu
- Story by: Vijaya Bapineedu
- Based on: Gang Leader (Telugu)
- Produced by: Shailendra Babu
- Starring: Upendra; Natanya Singh; Ashok; Gurukiran; Advani Lakshmi Devi; B.C. Patil
- Cinematography: Sai Sathish
- Edited by: S. Manohar
- Music by: Gurukiran
- Production company: Sri Shailendra productions
- Release date: 27 March 2003
- Running time: 158 mins
- Country: India
- Language: Kannada

Kutumba (transl. Family) is a 2003 Kannada-language action film starring Upendra and Natanya Singh. The film was directed by Naganna and produced by Shailendra Babu. Music for the film was scored by Gurukiran. It is the first among a series of successful films under Upendra — Naganna combination. The film also starred Ashok, Gurukiran, Advani Lakshmi Devi, Shwetha in supporting roles and B.C. Patil and Sathya Raj played the negative roles. The film is a remake of the 1991 Telugu film Gang Leader starring Chiranjeevi. The success of the film led to the release of two other successful films under Upendra — Naganna combination, namely Gokarna in 2003 and Gowramma in 2005.

== Cast ==
- Upendra as Vijay
- Natanya Singh as Kanyakumari
- Ashok as Vivek
- Gurukiran as Vidhyadhar
- M. N. Lakshmi Devi
- B. C. Patil as Shankar Patil
- Arjun (Firoz Khan) as Jayaraj Patil
- Nithin Gopi as Sagar
- Dr. Nagesh kavati
- Bank Suresh
- Shwetha as Menaka
- Sathyaraj as DCP Shekhar
- Thalapathi Dinesh
- Doddanna as Jailer
- Mysore Ramanand
- Mandeep Roy as House Broker
- Pailwaan Venu
- Pushpa Swamy as Chief Minister
- Hanumanthe Gowda
- R. G. Vijayasarathy as Home Minister
- Myna Chandru as Astrologer
- Stunt Siddu
- Ravi Varma
- Narasimha Moorthi
- Jayalakshmi Patil as Lakshmi, Vivek's Wife
- Sridhar Raj as Sub-inspector A. B. Gowda

== Soundtrack ==
The soundtrack album was released in Hubli in April 2003 by Police Commissioner of the city, K. V. Gagandeep, and Mayor, Prakash Kyarakatti. The music was composed by Gurukiran.

Kutumba

Soundtrack album by Gurukiran
- Released: April 2003
- Genre: Feature Film soundtrack
- Length: 22:28
- Language: Kannada
- Label: Anand Audio
External audio
- Official Audio Jukebox on YouTube

No.	Title	Lyrics	Singer(s)	Length
1.	"Jai Ganesha"	Upendra	Manu	3:45
2.	"Mujhe Kuchu Kuchu"	Kaviraj	Udit Narayan, Nanditha	4:26
3.	"Hele Meenakshi"	Kaviraj	Gurukiran	5:14
4.	"Allukku Balikinalli"	Upendra	Udit Narayan	4:41
5.	"Nee Nanna Appikolalavva"	Kaviraj	Hemanth, Shamitha	4:19
Total length:				22:28

== Reception ==
A critic from Viggy wrote that "In a nutshell, is a mass entertainer with a difference with Upendra's touch". Indiainfo wrote "This film is for everyone. It does not have the tag line " Budhivantharige Mathra'. Infact [sic] you need no intelligence to watch this movie. Two hours of entertainment and a total paisa vasool".

== Box office ==
Kutumba ran for 50 days in more than 17 centres across Karnataka and recorded 100 days in many centres across the state like Bangalore, Mysore, Davanagere, Shimoga, Mangalore, Hubli. It also completed 125 days of run at its main center in Bangalore.
