= I Love You (2019 film) =

2019 film written, directed and produced by R. Chandru

- Theatrical release poster
- Directed by: R. Chandru
- Written by: R. Chandru
- Produced by: R. Chandru
- Starring: Upendra; Rachita Ram; Sonu Gowda
- Cinematography: Sugnaan
- Edited by: Deepu S. Kumar
- Music by: Dr. Kiran Thotambyle
- Production company: Sri Siddeshwara Enterprises
- Release date: 14 June 2019
- Running time: 122 minutes
- Country: India
- Language: Kannada

I Love You is an Indian Kannada-language romantic drama film written, directed and produced by R. Chandru. It completed 100 days in many theatres. The film features Upendra, Rachita Ram and Sonu Gowda in the lead roles. The film is the second collaboration of Upendra and director Chandru after the successful Brahma (2014).

The film is based on Upendra's earlier movies A, Upendra and Uppi 2. The cinematography was by Sugunaan and music composed by Dr. Kiran Thaotambyle, Indra K.M., and Aria Dakshin. The movie was reported to be similar to the 2007 English movie I Think I Love My Wife which itself was based on the 1972 French movie Love in the Afternoon.

== Premise ==
Santhosh, a happy-go-lucky man, believes that love is trumpcard for lust. Dharmika, who aspires to take a PhD believes that love is divine. How she changes his mind is crux of the plot.

== Cast ==
- Upendra as Santhosh
- Rachita Ram as Dharmika
- Sonu Gowda as Gowri
- P. D. Sathish Chandra as Maalinga
- Sayaji Shinde
- Brahmanandam as Santhosh's PA
- Jai Jagadish
- Honnavalli Krishna as Santhosh's father
- Sonia Bose
- Nitesh Nittur

== Soundtrack ==
The film's music has been scored by Dr. Kiran Thaotambyle, Indra K.M, and Aria Dakshin. The audio rights of the film was bought by Lahari Music.

No.	Title	Lyrics	Singer(s)	Length
1.	"Ondanondu Kaaladinda"	Dhananjay	Suchith Suresh
2.	"Maatanaadi Maayavade"	Santosh Naik	Armaan Malik
3.	"Life Ene T20"	Santosh Naik	Upendra, Chethan Naik, Vasushree Halemane
4.	"Love Annodu Ondh Dodda Roga"	Santosh Naik	Chethan Naik, Vasushree Halemane
5.	"Ninna Hrudaya"	Indra KM	Anuradha Bhat
6.	"Ninna Hrudaya" (Male)	Indra KM	Indra KM

== Release ==
The film was released on 14 June 2019.

== External sources ==
- I Love You at IMDb
- I Love You – FilmiBeat
