= Gokarna (film) =

- Directed by: Naganna
- Written by: K Nanjunda (Dialogue)
- Produced by: Sudheendra Kumar
- Starring: Upendra; Rakshita
- Cinematography: Krishnakumar
- Edited by: S. Manohar
- Music by: Gurukiran
- Production company: Anegudda Vinayaka Productions
- Release date: 25 December 2003
- Running time: 146 minutes
- Country: India
- Language: Kannada

Gokarna is a 2003 Indian Kannada-language action drama film starring Upendra and Rakshita. The film was directed by Naganna and produced by Upendra's brother Sudheendra Kumar under the banner Anegudda Vinayaka Productions. Music for the film was scored by Gurukiran. It is the second among a series of successful films with the Upendra–Naganna combination. The film also features Madhu Bangarappa, Tennis Krishna, S. Ramesh, Satyajith, Dr. Nagesh, and Indhudhar in supporting roles. It is a remake of the 1992 Tamil film Annaamalai, which itself was a remake of the 1987 Hindi film Khudgarz, which in turn was based on Jeffrey Archer's 1979 novel Kane and Abel.

== Cast ==
- Upendra as Sidda
- Rakshita as Pooja
- Madhu Bangarappa
- Tennis Krishna
- S. Ramesh
- Satyajit
- Dr. K. G. Nagesh
- Indhudhar
- Sitara Vaidya
- Shweta Menon as dancer

== Production ==
After the huge success of the previous project with the Upendra–Naganna combination Kutumba, the producer of the film Shailendra Babu announced that his next film would be titled as Jai Ganesha, having the same film troupe. But the film did not take off due to conflict between Upendra and him. Upendra then gathered the same team of Kutumba (barring the producer) and decided to remake the 1992 Rajinikanth-starrer Annaamalai with his brother producing it. Upendra stated that while Annamalai was a story of two brothers, Gokarna portrays the story of two young friends. Rakshita was cast as the female lead opposite him. The president of the Karnataka Film Chamber of Commerce and Madhu Bangarappa of Akash Audio made their acting debut with the film. It was reported that actress Shweta Menon was signed for an item number. A. V. Krishna Kumar served as the cinematographer, Gurukiran as composer and Thriller Manju as the stunt coordinator. The film was shot mainly in Bangalore and Hyderabad.

== Soundtrack ==
Gurukiran scored the music for the film while Upendra and Kaviraj penned the lyrics for the soundtrack. The album consists of five tracks. The audio release function was held at The Club, Bangalore. Actor and politician Ambareesh released the soundtrack album. The event was followed by the ramp show and dance program performed by a local dance troupe. Two songs from the film were screened for the media. G. P. Rajarathnam's poem Brahma Ninge was adapted as a song for the film.

Title	Singers
"Aaseye Dhukkakke"	Udit Narayan
"Chakkar Haaku"	S. P. Balasubrahmanyam, Shamitha Malnad
"Bramha Ninge"	S. P. Balasubrahmanyam
"Baro Baro"	Shankar Mahadevan
"Jwara Illade"	Udit Narayan, K. S. Chithra

== Box office ==
Although Gokarna turned out to be a safe bet at the box office, it was not as successful as the previous film with the Upendra–Naganna combination, Kutumba. However, Gokarna completed a 175-day run in Bangalore. The film was followed by yet another successful film with the same combination, Gowramma (2005).
