= H2O (2002 film) =

2002 Indian Kannada-language film

H_{2}O
- DVD cover
- Directed by: N. Lokanath; Rajaram
- Written by: Upendra; Daya (Tamil dialogue)
- Produced by: P. Dhanraj
- Starring: Upendra; Prabhudeva; Priyanka Upendra
- Cinematography: H. C. Venugopal
- Edited by: T. Shashikumar
- Music by: Sadhu Kokila
- Production company: Dhanaraj Films
- Release date: 29 March 2002
- Running time: 134.30 minutes
- Country: India
- Languages: Kannada; Tamil
- Budget: ₹8 crore

H_{2}O is a 2002 Indian Kannada-language film directed by debutants N. Lokanath and Rajaram. The film's script was written by Upendra, who stars in the lead role with Prabhu Deva and Priyanka Trivedi, along with Babu Mohan, Sadhu Kokila and Bank Janardhan portraying supporting roles. The film was dubbed in Tamil as H_{2}O Kaveri and was produced by P. Dhanraj under Dhanraj Films.

The film's plot revolves around the fight between two villages, as the Kaveri water issue became controversial upon its release and did well at box office. The film's cinematography and editing were handled by H. C. Venugopal and T. Shashikumar respectively. The film was dubbed in Telugu under the same name, and it was dubbed into Hindi as Dil Ki Dhadkan. The core concept of using the dispute between two states as a metaphorical reference in the story went on to inspire a similar attempt in the 2016 Marathi movie Marathi Tigers.

== Plot ==
Udayashankar Gowda is a rustic man from Honnur, Karnataka. Elsewhere, Vairamuthu is an educated youth from Chennur, Tamil Nadu. Kaveri, who was born to a Kannadiga-Tamil couple killed in riots, works as a doctor in both villages. Both Udayashankar and Vairamuthu fall for Kaveri; who prevails forms the rest of the story.

== Cast ==
- Upendra as Udayashankar Gowda
- Prabhu Deva as Vairamuthu
- Priyanka Upendra as Kaveri
- Babu Mohan as Kirik
- Sadhu Kokila
- Bank Janardhan
- Ravindranath
- Shankar Bhat
- Pushpa Swamy
- Kavitha as Vairamuthu's mother
- Chetan as a Chennur villager
- Mandapanda Aiyappa as a king, who was Kaveri's father in past life
- Pandu as a Chennur villager
- King Kong as Vairamuthu's friend
- Tiruppur Ramasamy as a Chennur villager
- Ganga-Jamuna as the Siamese twins
- Pasi Sathya as a Chennur villager

Uncredited

- Kovai Senthil as a handicapped Chennur villager
- Nellai Siva as a Chennur villager
- Crane Manohar as a Chennur villager
- Scissor Manohar as Vairamuthu's friend
- Chaplin Balu as a Chennur villager

== Production ==
=== Development ===
The script was initially written for Dr. Rajkumar and Rajinikanth; both refused to do the film due to its sensitive nature. The film was launched on 8 December 2000 on Bangalore Palace grounds. N. S. Shankar who earlier directed Ulta Palta (1997) was originally chosen as the director but left the project and was replaced by debutants Loknath and Rajaram, who assisted Upendra. The film's name was not immediately released when the project was announced.

=== Casting and filming ===
While a majority of the film was shot in Kannada, some scenes were shot in Tamil only. Ganga and Yamuna, siamese twins from Calcutta were brought to act in the film. A song was shot at Sam Sund Dunes, Kuldhara village, Pag Bawri, and Gadisar Lake at Jaisalmer, while the rest of the song including the war sequences was shot at Mohan Garh Fort, Pokhran fort. Two hundred horses from Mumbai were brought in specifically for this sequence. According to the film's producer Dhanraj, "exactly 1.80 lakh feet of film is cranked for the 18,000 feet. Nearly 36 hours of film has been stored for 2 and a half hours". For a song which was shot at Ooty, colorful flowers were spread around the hills with 20 dancers. It was shot for 18 days using an ARRI 435 ES camera. The song also featured "14 feet rotating globe underneath a motor and covered the motor with small size globes" which Upendra danced on.

== Soundtrack ==
Sadhu Kokila composed the music for the film. The lyrics were written by Upendra. The soundtrack album was released on 27 May 2001 at Kanteerava Studios, Bangalore.

Title	Singers	Length
"Hoove Hoove"	Kavita Krishnamurthy	5:50
"Bida Beda Bida Beda"	Hariharan, Upendra	5:06
"Kandavideko Mamsavideko"	Shankar Mahadevan	5:53
"I Wanna See My Darling"	Rajesh Krishnan, Pratima Rao	5:22
"OK OK OK"	Gurukiran	5:49
"Dil Ilde Love"	Upendra	5:43

=== Reception ===
H_{2}O was Upendra's return to the big screen after a hiatus of 2 years. Upon its audio release, a record number of audio cassettes and CDs were sold. The film created a new record and went on to do a business of more than ₹1 crore through audio sales. Soundtrack numbers like "I Wanna See My Darling", "Hoove Hoove", "Naa Ninna Bidalare", "Bida Byada", and "Dil Ilde" went on to top the charts.

== Themes ==
H2o is a triangular love story between a Kannadiga and a Tamilian vying for the love of a girl called "Kaveri", it is actually a metaphorical reference for the river Cauvery dispute between Karnataka and Tamil Nadu. Upendra noted that he compared the issue to Siamese twins "tried to communicate that harmonious living is the only suitable solution to the Cauvery dispute, rather than fighting over it." The river Kaveri which is a subject matter of dispute between two states of Karnataka and Tamil Nadu being used as a metaphorical reference in the movie by naming the heroine as "Kaveri" and making the two lead heroes belonging to these two states went on to inspire the 2016 Marathi movie Marathi Tigers which was a triangular love story between two lead heroes belonging to Maharashtra and Karnataka vying for the love of a girl called "Seema" (literally meaning border) – thereby referring to the border dispute between these two states.

== Release ==
=== Marketing ===
A 100 feet huge cutout was kept at Kapali Theatre, Bangalore.

=== Controversy ===
The film became controversial due to its content as the activists from Karnataka and Tamil Nadu demanded the film to be banned. Upendra was forced to compromise by dubbing Tamil dialogues in the film into Kannada and vice versa, to appease linguistics sentiments on both sides. Scenes containing flags of political parties were deleted before its re-release. The film's Tamil version was never released in Malaysia due to a rule that "any film that is likely to instigate enmity between two groups will not be given permission for screening."

=== Critical reception ===
Sify wrote "On the whole Upendra and Co. have dished out a decent entertainer with a clear message that politicians are responsible for all troubles in our society". Indiainfo wrote "Though it is based on 'Cauvery water issue' where the two villages are the two states and represented by the two heroes. Cauvery is the core issue between them. Infact the subject is good but the treatment is superficial". Reviewing the Tamil version Kaveri, Malini Mannath of Chennai Online wrote, "One doesn't know the intention of the director when he began the film. All we can say is that the director was terribly distracted during the making of it. By the obvious charms of the heroine Priyanka, who flits around the place in her two-piece minis, anything lesser would have brought on the charge of obscenity. Whether the director had managed to put across his message or not, he has definitely managed to show 'Cauvery' in all her glory!".

=== Box-office performance ===
H_{2}O completed 50 days of run in 28 theatres across Karnataka and also went on to complete 75 days of run in Bangalore, despite controversies and release in excessive number of theatres playing spoilsport. H_{2}O was a 'Semi Hit' at the box office. Although a commercial success, it turned out to be the least running film of Upendra till then in terms of long run by completing only 75 days of run. This was very less compared to his previous films like A (1998), Upendra (1999), Preethse (2000), all of which had completed more than 175 days of run. Unlike other Upendra films of that time, H_{2}O could not get a long run at the box office mainly due to negative controversies and temporary ban on the film.

However, irrespective of its under-performance, the distributors and exhibitors made huge business from H_{2}O. Even though the distributors of H_{2}O earned huge profits and the film's collections were on par with other hit films of that time, it was termed as a flop by the media because of the film not reaching expectations. Producer Dhanraj went on a strike against Upendra demanding free call-sheet from him, stating that he had suffered huge losses from the movie.

However, H_{2}O continues to remain in the 'Hit' status among some section of the media and box office analysts. Rajaram, one of the directors of the film, mentioned in an interview that "H_{2}O had a successful run at the box office, although the product couldn't reach the mass properly baked, for so many other reasons". In an interview with TV9 in 2011, Upendra denied that H_{2}O was a failure. According to Upendra, the film got extra ordinary openings and collections at the box office, but could not get a long run beyond 75 days due to excessive release, mass distribution and controversies playing spoilsport. Upendra explained that a major chunk of H_{2}O's profits went to the distributors and exhibitors instead of the producer due to mass distribution and flawed marketing by the producer.
