= Samrat (1994 film) =

- Directed by: Naganna
- Written by: Late Srivathsa Ranganath
- Screenplay by: T. N. Narasimhan Naganna
- Story by: Naganna
- Produced by: M. Rajashekar
- Starring: Vishnuvardhan; Soumya Kulkarni; Vinaya Prasad; Puneet Issar
- Cinematography: J.G. Krishna
- Edited by: Suresh Urs
- Music by: Hamsalekha
- Production company: Sri Gayatri Mata Pictures
- Distributed by: Manik Chand
- Release date: 4 May 1994
- Running time: 126 minutes
- Country: India
- Language: Kannada

Samrat is a 1994 Indian Kannada-language action thriller film written and directed by Naganna, making his debut, and produced by M. Rajashekar. The film starred Vishnuvardhan, Sowmya Kulkarni (in her Kannada debut) and Vinaya Prasad. The film's music is scored by Hamsalekha whilst the cinematography is by J.G. Krishna.

== Cast ==
- Vishnuvardhan as Samrat
- Soumya Kulkarni as Sandhya, Samrat's lover
- Puneet Issar as Bhandaari
- Vajramuni as police commissioner
- Maanu as Chief minister
- Sudheer as Kulkarni Home Minister
- Rockline Venkatesh as Amavasye
- Ramesh Bhat as Baasha, Samrat's friend
- Avinash as Ekanath, Samrat's best friend and Sandhya's brother (special appearance)
- Lohithaswa
- Mandeep Roy
- Sarigama Viji
- Nagendra Shah
- Bharat Bhagavatar
- Mahesh
- Jackie shivu
- Vinaya Prasad as a dancer (special appearance)

== Soundtrack ==
The music of the film was composed and lyrics written by Hamsalekha. After release, the soundtrack was well received and the track "Nimakade Sambarandre" became an all-time hit song. It is rated as one of the top 10 Kannada patriotic songs by Filmibeat.

Track listing
No.	Title	Lyrics	Singer(s)	Length
1.	"Eradu Manada Maathe"	Hamsalekha	S. P. Balasubrahmanyam, K. S. Chithra
2.	"Nange Duddandre Lekka Illa"	Hamsalekha	S. P. Balasubrahmanyam
3.	"Jeevanave Hudukaata"	Hamsalekha	S. P. Balasubrahmanyam
4.	"Nesara Banda"	Hamsalekha	S. P. Balasubrahmanyam, K. S. Chithra
5.	"Nimkade Sambar Andre"	Hamsalekha	S. P. Balasubrahmanyam, Malgudi Subha
