= Lava Kusha (2007 film) =

- Directed by: Om Sai Prakash
- Written by: Mohan Shankar
- Produced by: Prabhakar
- Starring: Shiva Rajkumar; Upendra; Jennifer Kotwal; Charmee Kaur
- Cinematography: R. Giri
- Edited by: K. Eshwar
- Music by: Gurukiran
- Production company: Vijaya Films
- Release date: 14 December 2007
- Running time: 151 minutes
- Country: India
- Language: Kannada

Lava Kusha is a 2007 Indian Kannada-language romance film directed by Om Sai Prakash and written by Mohan Shankar. The film stars Shiva Rajkumar and Upendra, teaming up together again after Preethse. The film also stars Charmy Kaur, Jennifer Kotwal in the lead roles. The film was produced by Prabhakar under his Vijaya Productions banner.

== Plot ==
Cheeni and Chakri are friends who trick people to earn money. When they get separated due to an unexpected turn of events, they go to extreme lengths to strengthen their bond of friendship

== Cast ==
- Shiva Rajkumar as Cheeni
- Upendra as Chakri
- Charmy Kaur as Sinchana
- Jennifer Kotwal as Sarah
- Ruthika as Milkmaid Nimmi
- Hema Choudhary as Mayamma
- Sayaji Shinde as Vishakanta
- Vinayak Joshi
- Girish Karnad as Master Rangarao
- Sumithra
- Tennis Krishna
- Satya Prakash as Surappa
- Bank Janardhan
- Vaijanath Biradar
- Mandya Ramesh
- Bullet Prakash
- Rohith Nagesh
- Sathyajith
- Joe Simon
- Mandeep Roy
- M. S. Umesh

== Soundtrack ==
The music of the film was composed by Gurukiran.

Lava Kusha

Soundtrack album by Gurukiran
- Released: 16 November 2007
- Genre: Feature film soundtrack
- Label: Anand Audio

No.	Title	Lyrics	Singer(s)	Length
1.	"Chindi Chindi"	Kaviraj	Mano, Shankar Mahadevan	04:20
2.	"Apple Apple"	Kaviraj	Upendra, Shamitha Malnad	05:02
3.	"Oh Snehave"	Hrudaya Shiva	Gurukiran, Fayaz Khan	05:50
4.	"Kamanna Makkalu"	Rudramurthy Shastry	Shivrajkumar, Vijay Yesudas, Gururaj Hoskote	04:23
5.	"Lava Kusha"	Kaviraj	Chetan Sosca, Hemanth Kumar, Nanditha, Chaitra H. G.	05:16
6.	"Hotappa Hot Sakkath"	Kaviraj	Puneeth Rajkumar, Chaitra H. G.	05:21

== Reception ==
A critic from The Times of India said that "There is no excuse for the experienced Saipraksh to churn out a film which has no relevance to these times". A critic from Rediff.com wrote that "Lava Kusha may please the fans of Uppi and Shivanna".
