= Dubai Babu =

- movie poster
- Directed by: Naganna
- Written by: Srinu Vytla (Story & Screenplay) K. Nanjunda (Dialogues)
- Produced by: Shailendra Babu
- Starring: Upendra; Nikita Thukral; Saloni Aswani
- Cinematography: Anil Xavier
- Edited by: T. Govardhan
- Music by: V. Sridhar
- Release date: 15 May 2009
- Running time: 2 hours 38 minutes
- Country: India
- Language: Kannada

Dubai Babu is a 2009 Kannada-language film directed by Naganna, and produced by Shailendra Babu under Shri Shailendra Productions. The film is a remake of Telugu film Dubai Seenu. It stars Upendra, Nikitha and Saloni Aswani in the lead roles.

== Synopsis ==
Dubai Babu revolves around Babu (Upendra) whose only aim is to fly to Dubai and get rich. He takes the help of a broker to fulfill this ambition and promptly gets duped by him. Stranded in Mumbai, he and his friends open a Pav Stall to keep things going. While in Mumbai, he runs into Vasundhara (Nikitha) and instantly falls for her. After a few meetings, Vasundhara disappears from Mumbai. Babu then heads to Bangalore in search of Vasundhara, who has now become a radio jockey. Trouble crops up in the form of her uncle Inspector Kalaiah, who has evil designs to marry her and constantly terrorises Vasundhara and her father. How Babu hoodwinks Kalaiah to get close to Vasundhara forms the rest of the story.

== Cast ==
- Upendra as Babu
- Nikita Thukral as Vasundhara
- Saloni Aswani
- Dwarakish
- Kumar Govind
- Sundar Raj
- M. S. Umesh
- Tennis Krishna
- Ramesh Pandit
- Rajesh Nataranga as Police Inspector
- Aryan Vaid
- Sadhu Kokila
- Sathyajith
- Sihi Kahi Chandru
- Mandeep Roy
- Zee TV Raghu
- Michael Madhu
- Kurigalu Prakash
- Mimicry Dayanand
- M. N. Lakshmi Devi

== Soundtrack ==
The score was composed by V. Sridhar.

| No. | Title | Lyrics | Singer(s) | Length |
|---|---|---|---|---|
| 1. | "Pe Pe Dum Dum" | Upendra | Kumar Sanu | 4:35 |
| 2. | "Abdullah" | Kaviraj | Karthik | 4:58 |
| 3. | "Bendakaloora Gowda" | Upendra | Upendra | 4:14 |
| 4. | "Baachiko" | V. Sridhar | Hariharan, Anuradha Bhat | 5:09 |
| 5. | "Once Upon a Time" | V. Sridhar | V. Sridhar | 4:14 |

== Reception ==
=== Critical response ===
A critic from The Times of India scored the film at 2.5 out of 5 stars and says "Nikhitha has done a neat job. Sadhu Kokila, Sangeetha, and Sathyajith have done a good job. V Sridhar's music has catchy tunes. Camerawork by Anil Xavier is okay". B S Srivani from Deccan Herald wrote "V Sridhar’s music is good, in patches. Unnecessary splicing of frames and frequent close-ups mar Anil Xavier’s work. Ramesh Pandit and Satyajit are good initially but every other comedy track prolongs boredom and snatches away interest from the viewer. After 'Kutumba' and 'Gowramma', 'Dubai Babu' comes as an unpleasant surprise". A critic from Bangalore Mirror wrote "From being unbelievable at first, the film turns out to be a farce by the end. There are a couple of good songs. But these alone are not reason enough to visit a cinema hall. And be warned not to venture into Kapali cinema hall, the 'main theatre' for this film. The roof leaks". R G Vijayasarathy of Rediff.com scored the film at 3 out of 5 stars and wrote "original songs by music director and lyricist Mussanje Sridhar. The lyrics and song picturisation of Bachchio, Dhochiko, Pe Pe Pe Dum Dum and Bendakaloora Gowda deserve special mention. The background score is equally effective. Cameraman Anil Xavier has handled his job with competence, scoring well in the song picturisations. All in all, Dubai Babu is a full length entertainer. Enjoy". A critic from Sify.com wrote "V Sridhar has three mass numbers for this mass entertainer of Upendra. All the three songs are shot well and edited well. Cinematographer Anil Jhaveri has done a nice job. Nothing worthwhile yet a film for the masses".
