= Aishwarya (film) =

- VCD cover
- Directed by: Indrajit Lankesh
- Written by: B. A. Madhu (dialogues)
- Screenplay by: Indrajit Lankesh
- Based on: Manmadhudu (2002) by Trivikram Srinivas
- Produced by: N. Kumar; Dr. Ramanjaneyalu
- Starring: Upendra; Deepika Padukone; Daisy Bopanna
- Music by: Rajesh Ramanath
- Production company: Chilukuru Balaji Productions
- Release date: 15 September 2006
- Running time: 147 minutes
- Country: India
- Language: Kannada

Aishwarya is a 2006 Indian Kannada-language romantic drama film directed by Indrajit Lankesh, starring Upendra, Deepika Padukone, in her film debut, and Daisy Bopanna. The film is an official remake of Manmadhudu (2002) with the flashback portion inspired by Ghajini (2005). The film featured Upendra as a rich advertisement executive and changed his mass image into a classy one.

== Plot ==
Abhishek Hegde (Upendra) had first fallen in love with a young lady Anjali (Daisy Bopanna) who was a model.

In the movie's flashback, as a struggling model, Anjali finds herself in a fortunate position where she is mistaken to be Abhishek's girlfriend and gets many new modelling offers. Abhishek tries to confront her on seeing the news about his affair with her, but falls in love with her instead. Anjali dies in an accident after the two declare their love and are hugging when Abhishek's car hits a lorry. As Anjali's family were not in favour of her decision of marrying Abhishek, he is informed that Anjali has married the person she has been engaged to. They did not care to visit him or tell him that Anjali has actually died, even when he was in the hospital recovering from injuries after the accident. Abhishek's grandfather had faked Anjali's wedding card, only to keep him away from further mental trauma. This angers Abhishek and he starts to hate women with the generalisation that all women are like Anjali.

After many years, Aishwarya Pai (Deepika Padukone) joins the company he works in as an assistant manager, which is owned by his paternal uncle. After a few days in the office, she gets Abhishek fired and she takes up the position of manager. Abhishek, now not knowing what to do talks to his aunt, but is interrupted by his uncle, who is mean to him. Finally, he takes up the job of assistant manager as that is the only vacancy available. Within a few days they are assigned a task in Vienna. The two travel to Europe on business for ten days and learn from each other. Aishwarya transforms Abhishek by her assertive and fun-loving nature. They fall in love with each other but don't express it. Abhishek finds out that Aishwarya is getting engaged as decided by her family to a very conservative family from Mandya. Aishwarya is aware of Abhishek's feelings for her. Both of them finally speak out their love. Now, Abhishek, to save his love, drives to reach Aishwarya. At that moment, Aishwarya is on a boat travelling to her wedding venue. Abhishek reaches there and shouts out for Aishwarya, and she responds by jumping into the river. They both unite and share their moment of joy by telling how much they love each other. The movie ends on a happy note and they are married.

== Cast ==
- Upendra as Abhishek Hegde
- Deepika Padukone as Aishwarya Pai
- Daisy Bopanna as Anjali
- Sadhu Kokila as SP Menshina Koy
- Ramakrishna as Abhishek's uncle
- Ramesh Bhat as Aishwarya's father
- Doddanna as Srikanthe Gowda
- Loknath as Abhishek's grandfather
- Om Prakash Rao as proprietor of advertising company
- Sharan as impersonator of Abhishek Hegde
- Komal as Bunk Seena
- Chidanand as Subramanya
- Kishan Shrikanth as Chintu
- Tulasi as Abhishek's aunt
- Chitra Shenoy as Aishwarya's mother
- Tejaswini Prakash as Shwetha
- Gautam Shetty as Murthy
- Srikanth Honnavalli as Abhishek's butler
- Mandeep Roy as Balu / Ramana Murthy
- R. G. Vijayasarathy as Sadashiva, Lankesh Patrike reporter
- H. G. Dattatreya as Anjali's uncle
- Srishaila
- Ashok Kheny as Veer Sundar (uncredited)
- Prashanth Sambargi as Abhishek's PA (uncredited)
- Indrajit Lankesh as himself (uncredited)

== Production ==
The muhurat shot took place on 23 July 2006.

== Soundtrack ==
Aishwarya

Soundtrack album by Rajesh Ramanath
- Released: 27 August 2006
- Genre: Feature film soundtrack
- Label: Anand Audio

The soundtrack was scored by Rajesh Ramanath.

No.	Title	Lyrics	Singers	Length
1.	"Aishwarya Aishwarya"	K. Kalyan	Kunal Ganjawala	4:34
2.	"Dhoni Dhoni"	K. Kalyan	Karthik	4:55
3.	"Manmatha"	Dr. V. Nagendra Prasad	Anushka Manchanda	4:58
4.	"Yella OK maduve Yaake?"	Dr. V. Nagendra Prasad	Upendra	4:33
5.	"Hudugi Hudugi"	K. Kalyan	Kunal Ganjawala	5:11
6.	"Aishwarya Aishwarya"	K. Kalyan	Upendra	4:34

== Box office ==
Aishwarya opened both in single screens and multiplexes as well. The film broke several opening box office records by generating a net share of ₹1.5 crore and a total gross of ₹20 million during its first week, out of which more than ₹10 million came from BKT (Bangalore, Kolar, Tumkur) alone, once again proving Upendra's strong foothold in the BKT region after his earlier record breaking opener Omkara which had also collected ₹10 million net from the BKT region in its first week. Aishwarya went on to complete 50 days at 30 centers across Karnataka and 75 days in Bangalore, and was a commercial success, although it could not reach expectations. Aishwarya grossed a total of ₹50 million in its entire run of 100 days and was among the top 5 hit films of 2006.

== Reception ==
R. G. Vijayasarathy of Rediff.com gave the film a rating of three out of five stars and opined that "Krishnakumar's lighting, choice of locations, sharp editing and the peppy music make Aishwarya a very pleasing watch". A critic from Indiaglitz wrote that "This is a film you should not miss". A critic from Viggy wrote that "In a nutshell, 'Aishwarya' is a film for the entire family and a good film from the writing, performance and execution stand point".
