= Parodi (film) =

- VCD cover
- Directed by: Om Sai Prakash
- Written by: Nanjunda (dialogues)
- Screenplay by: Om Sai Prakash
- Based on: Krantiveer (Hindi) by Mehul Kumar
- Produced by: L Lingaraj; B P Thyagu
- Starring: Upendra; Neha
- Cinematography: Ramesh Babu
- Edited by: S Manohar
- Music by: Rajesh Ramanath
- Production company: LR Productions
- Release date: 27 February 2007
- Running time: 122 minutes
- Country: India
- Language: Kannada

Parodi (transl. Vagabond) is a 2007 Indian Kannada-language action film directed by Om Sai Prakash. The film stars Upendra and Neha. It is a remake of the Hindi film Krantiveer (1994). The film was released on 27 February 2007.

== Cast ==
- Upendra as Vijay
- Neha as Bharathi
- Pradeep Rawat
- Umashree
- Rangayana Raghu as a money lender
- Sathyajit
- Mansi
- Sadhu Kokila
- Tennis Krishna
- Joe Simon

== Production ==
The film had its final phase of shooting in Bangalore in December 2006. Upendra and Hindi actors Neha and Pradeep Rawat were cast in the lead.

== Soundtrack ==
The music was composed by Rajesh Ramanath. Upendra wrote the lyrics and sung for a song in the film. The other songs were written by M. N. Vyasa Rao, Sriranga, and Rudramurthy Shastry.

No.	Title	Lyrics	Singer(s)	Length
1.	"Cool Drinksu"	Sri Ranga	Shankar Mahadevan	5:00
2.	"Baare Baare"	M. N. Vyasa Rao	Kunal Ganjawala, Shashikala	4:43
3.	"Parodi Parodi"	Upendra	Upendra	5:20
4.	"Yeddu Baaro"		S. P. Balasubrahmanyam	5:16
5.	"Huttiruva Mannige"		Rajesh Krishnan, K. S. Chithra	5:17

== Reception ==
A critic from The Hindu opined that "The director attempts to exercise his hold on the audience in a liberal fashion, undermining the latter's sensibility". R G Vijayasarathy of Rediff.com gave the film a rating of one out of five stars and opined that "The ineptness of this film is, in short, such that even a popular star like Upendra can do nothing for its prospects at the box office". A critic from Sify gave the film a verdict of below average and said that "This is a poorly made film with nothing new in the offering. Bizarre films with similar content seem to the order of the day in Kannada!" The film was a box office failure.
