= Naanu Naane =

- DVD cover
- Directed by: D. Rajendra Babu
- Screenplay by: D. Rajendra Babu
- Story by: Dharmesh Darshan
- Produced by: Medikonda Muralikrishna
- Starring: Upendra; Sakshi Shivanand
- Cinematography: Prasad Babu
- Edited by: A. Sreekar Prasad
- Music by: Deva
- Production company: Sri Venkataramana Productions
- Release date: 11 October 2002
- Running time: 145 minutes
- Country: India
- Language: Kannada

Naanu Naane (transl. Me, Myself) is a 2002 Indian Kannada-language film directed by D. Rajendra Babu starring Upendra and Sakshi Shivanand with Anant Nag and Pavitra Lokesh in supporting roles. It is a remake of the Hindi film Raja Hindustani.

== Cast ==
- Upendra as Raja
- Sakshi Shivanand as Arathi
- Anant Nag
- Ramya Krishna (Guest appearance)
- Pavitra Lokesh
- Sadhu Kokila
- Kovai Sarala
- Ramesh Bhat
- Karthik Sharma
- Manjaiah
- Adi Lokesh

== Production ==
The film was shot in Madikeri and Munnar while three songs were picturised in Australia.

== Soundtrack ==
The music was composed by Deva and released by Magnasound Records. The songs "Pardesi Pardesi Jaana Nahi" and "Aaye Ho Meri" from the original Hindi film have been retained here.

Naanu Naane

Soundtrack album by Deva
- Released: 2002
- Recorded: 2002
- Genre: Soundtrack
- Length: 40:05
- Label: Magnasound Records
- Producer: Deva

Deva chronology
| Kotigobba (2001) | Naanu Naane (2002) | Nata (2002) |

Track list
| No. | Title | Lyrics | Singer(s) | Length |
|---|---|---|---|---|
| 1. | "Sangaathi" | V. Nagendra Prasad | K. J. Yesudas, Anuradha Sriram | 5:55 |
| 2. | "Gelathiye" | V. Nagendra Prasad | S. P. Balasubrahmanyam, Anuradha Sriram | 5:21 |
| 3. | "Neenaade Mareechike" | R. N. Jayagopal | S. P. Balasubrahmanyam, Anuradha Sriram | 7:09 |
| 4. | "Oh Geleya" | R. N. Jayagopal | S. P. Balasubrahmanyam | 1:52 |
| 5. | "Kodagina Gandu" | V. Nagendra Prasad | S. P. Balasubrahmanyam | 5:51 |
| 6. | "Nee Bande Baalinalli" | R. N. Jayagopal | K. J. Yesudas | 5:52 |
| 7. | "Neenaade Marechike - Version 2" | R. N. Jayagopal | S. P. Balasubrahmanyam, Nanditha | 8:05 |
| Total length: | | | | 40:05 |

== Reception ==
Srikanth of Deccan Herald wrote that "This is Sakshi Shivanand’s film all the way. She has once again proved that given the right opportunities she can certainly perform apart from being a pretty face. The same cannot be said about Upendra who has gone in for a change of image through this film Gimmicks do not work always going by what happened to all his releases this year — H2O, Superstar and Naagarahaavu — all disasters. He needs to take up acting lessons seriously if he wants to remain an actor". Indiainfo wrote "The director Rajendra Babu has tried to trim the film with expertise. There is no usual Uppi style, no hasty dialogues and no gaudy dresses and weird gimmicks. It is a plain family movie. But remake film being a remake film, there are flaws like the directly translated dialogues and songs, which are intolerable".
