= Emani =

Emani is a Persian surname of Indian origin. It is the alternate spelling of the word Iman which denotes faith or certitude to the unseen. It is also a Telugu surname, denoting ancestry from Emani, Andhra Pradesh. Emani may also be a given name.

== Given name ==
- Emani Bailey (born 2001), American football player
- Emani Biswas, Indian politician
- Emani Moss, child murdered in Georgia, US in 2013

== Surname ==
- Vijaya Lakshmi Emani (1957–2009), Indian-American women's rights activist
- Emani Sambayya (1905–1972), Indian Anglican priest, theologian and academic
