= UI (film) =

2024 Indian film by Upendra

- Theatrical release poster
- Directed by: Upendra
- Written by: Upendra
- Produced by: G. Manoharan; Sreekanth K. P. Bhaumik Gondaliya
- Starring: Upendra; Reeshma Nanaiah
- Cinematography: H. C. Venugopal
- Edited by: Vijay Raj B. G.
- Music by: B. Ajaneesh Loknath
- Production companies: Lahari Films; Venus Entertainers; Zee Studios
- Release date: 20 December 2024
- Running time: 132 minutes
- Country: India
- Language: Kannada
- Budget: ₹60–100 crore
- Box office: ₹47 crore

UI is a 2024 Indian Kannada-language sci-fi dystopian surrealist psychological action comedy film written and directed by Upendra in his directorial final and produced by Lahari Films and Venus Entertainers. The film stars Upendra in a triple role as Sathya, Kalki and Upendra Rao, alongside Reeshma Nanaiah, Nidhi Subbaiah, Murali Sharma, Sadhu Kokila and Indrajit Lankesh. The film's music was composed by B. Ajaneesh Loknath, while cinematography and editing were handled by H. C. Venugopal and Vijay Raj. B.G.

UI was released on 20 December 2024, coinciding with Christmas weekend, to mixed reviews from critics and audience.

== Plot ==
Actor-filmmaker Upendra Rao releases the film UI, which controversially receives a unique "UI (Universal Intelligence)" certificate from the CBFC. The release triggers widespread protests and celebrations. Film analyst Kiran Adarsh (Murali Sharma) is asked to review the film but delays, saying he must first understand its deeper intent.

Kiran visits a remote house where Upendra once wrote scripts. A maid reveals that Upendra wrote a script for two weeks a year earlier and later burned it, but she secretly preserved it and gives it to Kiran. The narrative then shifts to the contents of this script.

The script opens with a mythological prologue: despite God's warning, Eve eats the forbidden fruit, leading to the birth of civilization, religion, business, inequality, wars, and societal divisions—setting the philosophical foundation of the story.

In the present age, Seena (Katri Seena), a habitual pickpocket, rises through deceitful politics, renames himself Vamana, and eventually becomes Raja Vamana Rao. Parallelly, fake god men and spiritual leaders manipulate society, symbolizing the corruption of Kali Yuga.

A selfless man named Satya, devoted to truth and righteousness, gains a mass following by redistributing wealth taken from the rich with his father Shastri, angering Vamana. Satya passively endures violence and becomes a moral symbol for the people. A prophecy reveals that Satya was born five minutes before midnight, narrowly missing being born as Kalki, the prophesied savior.

A ruthless gangster is later revealed to be Kalki, Satya's younger twin brother, born exactly at midnight. Kalki was abducted at birth and raised violently, shaping his nihilistic worldview. Declaring himself Kalki, he announces his mission to end Kali Yuga and is celebrated by the masses. His father publicly proclaims him as the savior.

Kalki imprisons Satya in his secret "inner world", a psychological laboratory where humans are studied as test subjects, while the outside society is termed the "outer world". Kalki believes humanity deserves destruction, while Satya insists society cannot be destroyed for the sins of a few and rejects claims of divinity.

Satya escapes captivity and witnesses mass human suffering. Meanwhile, Kalki manipulates society using fear, religion, food control, caste divisions, and spectacle, provoking chaos and communal violence. Though initially hailed as a savior, Kalki's rule devolves into dictatorship and mass killings.

As people begin recognizing Satya as the true moral force, Kalki loses control. Satya publicly rejects caste and religion, but is violently attacked by the very people he seeks to uplift, exposing society's hypocrisy.

The script abruptly cuts to Upendra himself, who admits this ending was not his intention. An imagined Kalki argues that humanity only understands harsh reality, not idealism. Upendra ultimately rejects this view and burns the script, believing people are intelligent enough to understand truth.

Returning to the present, Kiran concludes that the released UI film is not the burned script, but a mirror of society itself. Unable to fully grasp its message despite multiple viewings, he tells the media he must watch it once more—after which the film reveals its final intent: UI is the reality of human behavior, not fiction.

== Cast ==
- Upendra in triple role as
  - Sathya
  - Kalki
  - Upendra Rao
- Reeshma Nanaiah as Nandini
- Sadhu Kokila as Joker, a clown in town
- Vinayak Trivedi as Shiva
- Murali Sharma as Kiran Adarsh, Film analyst and Trade expert
- Indrajit Lankesh as Mahesh
- Nidhi Subbaiah as Sunaina
- Om Sai Prakash as Vijay
- Guruprasad as Arjun
- P. Ravi Shankar as Vaamana Rao
- Achyuth Kumar as Suriya
- Hamsa Prathap as Aishwarya
- Neetu as Meera
- Lasya Nagraj as Keerthy

== Production ==
=== Development ===
Upendra conceived the story for UI in the mid-2000s. This was his eleventh film as a director and first since Uppi 2 (2015). The theme and storyline of the film was not revealed by the makers to the media even during the final filming stages of UI; they maintained that it was an "entertaining subject yet it tackles a significant global issue." In an interview to Bangalore Times in June 2023, Upendra mentioned that "With UI, I want to build a totally different world visually. It will be 'surrealistic'". A report stated that the film was reportedly made at a budget of ₹100 crore.

The film got U/A certification on 19 December 2024.

=== Cast and crew ===
The film was launched on 3 June 2022, and the makers revealed the meaning of the title UI to be the mark worn on forehead. G. Manoharan's Lahari Films and K. P. Sreekanth's Venus Enterrtainers were reported to produce the film. It was also reported that, alongside Kannada, the film would be released in Telugu, Tamil, Hindi and Malayalam. Actor Murali Sharma was reported to be a part of the film's cast when the film was announced in June 2022. A month later, actress Nidhi Subbaiah's signing was reported. However, until November 2022, no other members of the cast were officially confirmed by the makers. However, it was speculated that Sunny Leone was a part of the cast. Reeshma Nanaiah's role was also speculated, and was a confirmed a few months later.

A May 2023 report revealed that Leone and Nanaiah had been cast, alongside Murali Krishna and Indrajit Lankesh, and that B. Ajaneesh Loknath would compose the film's music. Shivakumar, who had previously worked in KGF film series and Salaar: Part 1 – Ceasefire, was hired as art director for the film. Deepu S. Kumar served as the film's editor, and Prajwal as the cinematographer. In June, it was reported that actress Veena Ponnappa, who previously appeared in Vedha (2022), was cast.

=== Filming and post-production ===
A co-producer of the film, Naveen Manohar, who contributed also on the technical front in the film's making, stated that the film features an entire city set, spanning 10 acres in area, complemented by extensive visual effects set extensions. He further elaborated on the visual effects, revealing that the team had created a unique world within the film, comprising over 1,400 VFX shots, and that the film incorporated various cutting-edge technologies, such as VR-Mocobot. He added that 3D scanning of Upendra was made using a setup of more than 200 DSLR cameras to create his CGI double. It was reportedly the first Asian film to use this technology. Manohar also revealed that an entire sequence was shot using a virtual reality pipeline. Creation technology of Industrial Light & Magic, which was previously employed in Avatar: The Way of Water (2022), was also used in the film. Filming locations included Bengaluru, Mysore and Hyderabad. UI was announced in June 2022. The music is composed by B. Ajaneesh Loknath.

Filming for UI completed in early August 2023, with a song sequence left pending to be shot in October that year. It was reported that Upendra also assisted in editing, which would take a month's time, before the dubbing process. Dubbing began in late August with Upendra voicing for the film's Kannada and Telugu versions.

== Marketing ==
A concept poster of the film was released by the makers on 3 June 2022. It featured a horse-like animal and other caricatures. On 2 January 2023, a 32-second BTS footage was released by the makers. On 1 May, another BTS footage of the making with the caption, "It is only through these hard workers and their hard work that we achieve great things" was released, to mark the International Workers' Day. A teaser was released on 18 September, on the occasion of Upendra's birthday. Cinema Express reported that it was "an audio-only teaser... with Upendra's voice shrouded in mystery and darkness, unveiling tantalizing sounds that hint at dripping water, thunderous gunshots, and a skilled man evading danger." The voice poses a question: "How does one escape from it?" before adding that if ones catches a glimpse of light and listens carefully, it imparts the wisdom of composure, concentration and the intricacies of weaponry. The teaser concluded with a woman's voice proclaiming, "This is not 'AI,' this is 'UI', Use your Intelligence." A double exposure picture with the character of Upendra's face on that of a horse was used as thumbnail of the teaser. It had four million views on YouTube in 24 hours.

== Soundtrack ==
UI

Soundtrack album by B. Ajaneesh Loknath
- Released: 2024
- Genre: Feature film soundtrack
- Language: Kannada
- Label: Lahari Music
- Producer: B. Ajaneesh Loknath

Singles from UI
- 1. "Cheap Song Promo" Released: 14 February 2024; 2. "Troll Song" Released: 4 March 2024

The music was composed by B. Ajaneesh Loknath.

Track listing
No.	Title	Lyrics	Singer(s)	Length
1.	"Cheap Song"	Upendra	Vijay Prakash, Nakash Aziz, Deepak Blue	3:05
2.	"Troll Song"	Naresh Kumar HN	Aishwarya Rangarajan, Harshika Devanath, Anup Bhandari, B. Ajaneesh Loknath	3:36
3.	"Fan India Song"	Upendra	Tippu, Nakash Aziz, Aishwarya Rangarajan	3:16
Total length:				4:23

== Release ==
=== Theatrical ===
It was originally scheduled to be released in October 2024, but was postponed due to post-production delays.

The film was theatrically released on 20 December 2024, coinciding with Christmas in Kannada, alongside Telugu, Tamil, Hindi and Malayalam languages.

=== Home media ===
The satellite rights of the film were acquired by Zee Kannada. It was reported that the post-theatrical streaming rights were acquired by Sun NXT, however, the producers have clarified that the streaming rights were yet to be acquired by a streaming company.

== Reception ==
=== Critical reception ===
Shashiprasad SM of Times Now rated the film 4/5 and wrote that "Upendra compresses a decade of philosophical musings into UI, presenting his personal reflections on life. However, how we receive it is up to the viewer—whether to accept it, reject it as nonsense, or find it too complex to grasp. With UI, Upendra masterfully conveys his perspective and then challenges the audience to reflect on their own views." Sanjay Ponnappa of India Today gave it 3.5/5 stars and wrote, "The film creatively uses metaphors to inspire introspection while commenting on socio-political issues. Although the old-school approach to the screenplay and performances might feel outdated to some, the socio-political commentary blended with satire keeps viewers engaged. Overall, UI firmly establishes itself within the distinctive 'director Upendra' genre."

Jagadish Angadi of Deccan Herald rated it 4/5 and wrote, "Upendra employs metaphors to convey his political and social philosophy. Through bold and unapologetic storytelling, he mocks society’s entrenched preferences and beliefs. He presents two potential solutions for the climax, allowing viewers to choose their own climax." A. Sharadhaa of Cinema Express rated it 3/5 and wrote, "The plot of UI is complex, with numerous twists that make it difficult to explain succinctly. The narrative is layered, and while it touches on religion, caste, and corruption, these themes feel underdeveloped and lack the depth they deserve."

Sridevi S. of The Times of India gave it 3/5 stars and wrote, "Upendra's films are so far known for their unique narrative and compelling storytelling, but this film feels more like a lecture than a cinematic experience. The philosophical elements fail to translate into engaging cinema as he tries to preach too many elements. A 2000-year-odd history is crunched into a 2-hour-long film." Vivek M. V. of The Hindu wrote, "The first and the last 15 minutes of UI are the most incredible portions of Kannada cinema in 2024. Apart from the twisted climax, the film is quite easy to comprehend, quashing the talks about the film being a mind-bending drama."

Sunayana Suresh of The South First rated it 3/5 stars and wrote, "The film has some good writing when it comes to dialogues and songs in vintage Upendra style, which makes the theatrical worth it for those who like that aspect. But, the visual effects in certain parts of the film do not sit right and overpower the narrative at times." Swaroop Kodur of The Hollywood Reporter India wrote that "The writer-director makes an impassioned case for countless topics such as human greed, lust, the idea and implications of God, religion, caste, politics and utopia-dystopia. The narrative, however, is devoid of a proper screenplay-led structure to guide all these conversations, leaving it fragmented and murky." Subha J Rao of The News Minute wrote that "UI, which came riding a blitzkrieg of promotion, offers a smorgasbord of garish images — the colour is so saturated, it hurts your eyes".

=== Box office ===
On day 1, the film earned ₹6.95 crore, day 2, ₹5.6 crore and day 3, ₹5.95 crore, with first week collection of ₹26.3 crore and 10 day collection of ₹29.45 crore. Though initially it was reported that the movie grossed around ₹37.15 crores to ₹40 crores, the final box office collection was reported to be ₹47 crores.
