= Operation Antha =

- Film poster
- Directed by: Upendra
- Screenplay by: Upendra
- Story by: Upendra
- Produced by: Harsh Darbar; Rama Krishna
- Starring: Ambareesh; Master Hirannaiah; Tara
- Cinematography: Sundarnath Suvarna
- Edited by: R. Janardhan
- Music by: V. Manohar
- Production company: Swathi Enterprises
- Release date: 3 December 1995
- Running time: 135 minutes
- Country: India
- Language: Kannada

Operation Antha is a 1995 Indian Kannada-language political action thriller film written and directed by Upendra, starring Ambareesh in the lead role, and is a direct sequel to the 1981 film Antha, which also starred Ambareesh. Ambareesh reprises his role as Kanwar Lal and Susheel Kumar.

== Plot ==
Kanwar Lal's partners are killed by Kanwar's lookalike Inspector Susheel Kumar 14 years ago. (Note: As depicted in Antha (1981).) commissioner Kulwanth receives a call indicating the arrival of his daughter, Mandakini, from US. Mandakini arrives and gets delusioned by the corruption in India and resolves to put an end to it. Kanwar Lal is released from prison after serving a life sentence. He meets Babu who gives him shelter and aspires to follow his path. Kanwar meets a middleman through whom he manages to make an unfriendly alliance with a few corrupt politicians. Master Hirannaiah and his friend are social workers and theatre artists. They expose a few politicians's dirty world through their street plays. The politicians sent Kanwar to kill them. Mandakini witnesses this and takes them to the hospital. They discover that they have the same ideals and decide to work as a team. Mandakini captures the videos and photos of the corrupt politicians in their dirty world while the duo criticise the government through their plays and newspaper articles.

The politicians upon finding out the truth send Kanwar and his gang to retrieve the video and photos. He leaves her with a warning. Mandakini is advised by Kulwanth to stay away from the politicians and criminals and justifies his point by narrating Susheel's past. After learning this, she decides to bail out Susheel and devises a unique plan. She manages to prove that Kanwar, who was released recently is actually Susheel while the real Susheel is Kanwar. Thereby Susheel is bailed out while Kanwar is taken back to prison. Upon release, Susheel kidnaps Mandakini and her friends where he takes them to an isolated building. He sells the photos and videos to the politicians for a hefty sum of ₹50 lakh (US$53,000)(equivalent to ₹30 crore (US$3.2 million) today). Susheel meets the middleman and organises a few gangsters and starts to form gangs by killing the major goons. Susheel warns Kulwanth not to trace them since Mandakini is in their custody.

When Mandakini demands an explanation, Susheel reveals that he is on a mission to kill some unknown influential people. He formed a nexus with the politicians so as to fight his rival. However Kulwanth traces them and sends police forces to attack. Susheel and his gang overpower them and Kulwanth gets killed by Susheel in the crossfire. Mandakini witnesses Kulwanth's death; she abuses Susheel. The trio claim that their major mistake was that they helped to bail out Susheel. Susheel reveals that his rival is the system of India and proclaims that he will go to any extent to eradicate corruption even if that means the death of his close friends. He begins the operation and names it Operation Antha. Susheel offers publicity to the mission by forcing the news channels to showcase their views and act against crimes. The politicians, who found this development alarming secretly manage to get Kanwar released from prison.

Susheel releases the trio who gets shocked to see the change brought by Operation Antha and decides to support it. Meanwhile, Susheel travels to Mumbai for obtaining weapons required for their mission. The politicians finding it as an excellent opportunity replaces Kanwar in place of Susheel by indicating that an accident occurred during the latter's journey. He crushes the mission and shows his face to the public through a TV channel thereby helping the police to identify the so-called anarchist. On his return, Susheel is startled to see the condition of Karnataka and happens to find that Kanwar is responsible for the crimes. While trying to kill Mandakini for sending him to prison, Kanwar is confronted by Susheel, where Susheel kills Kanwar. However the politicians provide complete authority to terminate Susheel and his gang. Susheel manages to escape in a helicopter promising that he will be back to clean the country again.

== Cast ==
- Ambareesh as Kanwar Lal / Sushil Kumar
- Ramesh Kamath as Police commissioner Kulwanth
- Harsh Darbar as Babu
- Rajendra Singh Babu as an advocate
- Sangeetha as Mandakini
- Tara
- Master Hirannaiah as Hirannaiah
- M. N. Lakshmidevi
- Sadhu Kokila as Drummer
- Lakshman
- Mimicry Dayanand as K. D. S. Naidu
- Bank Janardhan
- N.B. Jayaprakash
- M. S. Umesh
- V. Manohar
- R. G. Vijayasarathy
- Harish Roy
- Kote Prabhakar
- Upendra in a cameo appearance

== Soundtrack ==
Operation Antha

Soundtrack album by V. Manohar
- Released: 1995
- Genre: Feature film soundtrack
- Language: Kannada
- Label: Jhankar Music

V. Manohar composed the film's background score and music for its soundtrack. The soundtrack album consists of five tracks.

Track listing
No.	Title	Singer(s)	Length
1.	"Bhaya Bhaya"	S. P. Balasubrahmanyam	4:39
2.	"Jilebi Jilebi"	S. P. Balasubrahmanyam	5:23
3.	"O Gelathi Manada"	S. P. Balasubrahmanyam	4:53
4.	"O Pussy Cat"	Manjula Gururaj, L. N. Shastry	2:40
5.	"Shame Shame"	Rajesh Krishnan, L. N. Shastry	4:24
