= Shrimathi =

2011 Indian film by Ravi Kumar

- Film poster
- Directed by: Ravi Kumar
- Screenplay by: Ravi Kumar
- Produced by: Shankar Gowda
- Starring: Upendra; Priyanka Trivedi; Celina Jaitly
- Cinematography: Rajesh Ramanath
- Edited by: Johny Lal
- Music by: Ghantadi Krishna
- Production company: Shankar Productions
- Release date: 8 July 2011
- Running time: 135 minutes
- Country: India
- Language: Kannada

Shrimathi is a 2011 Indian Kannada romance drama film directed by Ravi Kumar, and remake of 2004 Bollywood film Aitraaz, which in turn, is loosely based on the film Disclosure. The film stars Upendra, Priyanka Trivedi and Celina Jaitly in the lead roles, along with Prem Chopra, Sayaji Shinde and Rekha Das in the supporting roles. It is produced by Shankare Gowda and features the original soundtrack and film score by Ghantadi Krishna.

== Cast ==
- Upendra as Rajakumar
- Priyanka Upendra as Priya
- Celina Jaitly as Sonia Roy
- Prem Chopra as Roy
- Sayaji Shinde
- Kota Srinivasa Rao
- Nutan Prasad
- Rekha Das
- Rajesh Nataranga

== Music ==
Shrimathi

Soundtrack album by Ghantadi Krishna
- Released: 2011
- Recorded: 2011
- Genre: Feature film soundtrack
- Length: 22:08
- Language: Kannada

Official audio
- Shrimathi - Full Album on YouTube

Track listing
No.	Title	Singer(s)	Length
1.	"Jhum Jhum Maiyella"	Badri, Shamita Malnad	5:39
2.	"Sanje Mussanje"	Chaitra H. G., Joel	3:52
3.	"Preethse Preethse"	Rajesh Krishnan, Nanditha	5:11
4.	"Luv Luv"	Hemanth, Sneha Ravindra	3:45
5.	"Viraha Noorutaraha"	Chaitra H. G.	4:21
Total length:			22:08

== Reception ==
=== Critical response ===
A critic from The Times of India scored the film at 3.5 out of 5 stars and says "Uppi has put up a brilliant show that keeps the story alive throughout. Hats off to Priyanka for her graceful performance. Celina Jaitley is simply superb. Prem Chopra is excellent. Rekha Das impresses. Cinematography by Jonylal and music by Rajesh Ramanath are brilliant". A critic from NDTV wrote "Johny Lal's camera work looks opulent on screen. The songs and sequences shot in Maldives are a treat to watch. Rajesh Ramanath scores well in the background score. The Viraha Viraha remix song should have been much better. Watch Srimathi for Priyanka Upendra's stunning performance". Shruti Indira Lakshminarayana from Rediff.com scored the film at 2 out of 5 stars and wrote "Celina is convincing as the scheming opportunist model. It is the leading ladies who will walk away with the honours in this film. Veteran actors Prem Chopra and Sayaji Shinde are wasted, and the dubbing only adds to their unimpressive characterisations. The songs are forgettable".

== Box office ==
Shrimathi was a below average grosser at the box office.
