= Omkara (2004 film) =

- DVD Cover
- Directed by: Shivamani
- Screenplay by: Shivamani
- Story by: Shivamani
- Produced by: Company Films
- Starring: Upendra; Preeti Jhangiani; Rahul Dev; Rangayana Raghu; Shwetha Menon
- Cinematography: Mathew Rajan
- Edited by: S. Manohar
- Music by: Gurukiran
- Production company: R. S. Productions
- Release date: 18 September 2004
- Running time: 165 minutes
- Country: India
- Language: Kannada

Omkara is a 2004 Indian Kannada-language crime thriller film starring Upendra and Preeti Jhangiani. It Is remake of bollywood 1988 film Tezaab with a different climax.The film was written and directed by Shivamani and produced by Company Films under the banner of R. S. Productions and has music by Gurukiran. Omkara was Upendra's first gangster film and was based on the connection between film industries and the Mumbai underworld mafia. The film had an all-time record opening in its first week, however; it became an above-average grosser at the box office.

== Cast ==
- Upendra as Sathya
- Preeti Jhangiani as Divya
- Rahul Dev as a Mumbai underworld kingpin
- Rangayana Raghu as Divya's father
- Sadhu Kokila
- Bank Janardhan
- Bullet Prakash
- Vaijanath Biradar
- Mimicry Dayanand
- Nagashekar
- Sadashiva Brahmavar
- Adarsha
- Vijayasarathi
- Shwetha Menon in a cameo appearance

== Production ==
The filming was held at Bangalore, Mangalore, Kasergod, Mumbai and Switzerland.

== Soundtrack ==
The film's soundtrack has seven songs composed by Gurukiran collaborating with Upendra for the sixth time. Upendra, Gurukiran, Kaviraj and V. Manohar penned the lyrics.

Omkara

Soundtrack album
- Released: 2004
- Genre: Feature film soundtrack
- Length: 26:02
- Language: Kannada
- Label: Akash Audio
- Producer: Gurukiran

chronology
Apthamithra (2004)	Omkara (2004)	Maurya (2004)

Track listing
No.	Title	Lyrics	Singer(s)	Length
1.	"Otthu Otthu Otu Otthu"	Upendra, V. Manohar	Upendra, Shamitha Malnad	5:35
2.	"Abbabba Eeke"	Kaviraj	Gurukiran, Chaitra H. G.	5:05
3.	"Bhalo Bhashi Bengalili"	Upendra	Hariharan, Kavita Krishnamurthy	5:40
4.	"Sootu Bootu"	Gurukiran	Gurukiran	4:34
5.	"Goli Maaro"	Kaviraj	Gurukiran, Chaitra H. G.	5:09

== Reception ==
=== Critical reception ===
Omkara received mixed reviews upon release. Indiaglitz gave the film a very positive review by saying, "Omkara is a film made on a large canvas and can be compared to any non-Kannada film in terms of richness and presentation. The film has excellent production values, a big-star cast and all the commercial ingredients in right proportion to make it an attractive proposition for today's youngsters. Upendra excels in the role and his delivery of the lines is once again superb. His dialogues have been a major attraction in all his films and "Omkaara" is no exception." Sify wrote "The redeeming features of this film are Upendra’s regular gimmicks, Gurukiran’s peppy music, Mathew’s eye catching photography and excellent mass elements that will satisfy the superstar’s fans. His lengthy and punchy dialogues receives applaud. The graphics used further lead to electrifying elements. Director Shivamani has followed the usual racy narration in ‘Omkaara’".

=== Box office ===
Omkara collected all-time record in first week all over Karnataka. Besides the theatre rent the film collected ₹1.75 crore from 200 shows a day in Karnataka with 55 prints. Omkara also had great opening in the Telugu and Tamil belts. But the film failed to live up to expectations and turned out to be just a moderate success at the box office.
