= Uppi Dada M.B.B.S. =

- Title card
- Directed by: D. Rajendra Babu
- Written by: Upendra (dialogue)
- Screenplay by: D. Rajendra Babu
- Based on: Munna Bhai M.B.B.S. (2003) by Rajkumar Hirani
- Produced by: K. Bhapaiah
- Starring: Upendra; Uma; Anant Nag; Chi Guru Dutt
- Cinematography: H. M. Ramachandra
- Edited by: T. Shashikumar
- Music by: R. P. Patnaik
- Production company: Gemini Film Circuit
- Release date: 3 February 2006
- Running time: 152 minutes
- Country: India
- Language: Kannada

Uppi Dada M.B.B.S. is a 2006 Indian Kannada-language comedy drama film directed by D. Rajendra Babu. It is a remake of the Hindi film Munna Bhai M.B.B.S.. The film stars Upendra, Uma and Anant Nag. The music is composed by R. P. Patnaik. The film received mixed reviews from critics who unfavourably compared it with the original.

== Cast ==
- Upendra as Rao Bahaddur Upendra Rao / Uppi Dada
- Chi Guru Dutt as Circuit
- Uma as Dr. Uma / Chinnu
- Anant Nag as Dr. Ashok Kashyap
- Srinath as Bahaddur Rajashekhar Rao, Upendra Rao's father
- Sumithra as Upendra Rao's mother
- Dattanna as Cleaner
- Chitra Shenoy
- Naveen Mayur as Cancer patient
- Narendra Babu Sharma as Compounder
- Sanketh Kashi as Dr. Kashinath
- Prithviraj
- Shankar Bhat
- Bank Janardhan
- Dileep Kumar
- Shankar Rao
- G. R. Ramdas

== Soundtrack ==
The soundtrack was composed by R. P. Patnaik

No.	Title	Lyrics	Singer(s)	Length
1.	"Preethse"		Kunal Ganjawala
2.	"M Andre"	Kaviraj	Mano
3.	"Gadi Bidi"	V. Nagendra Prasad	Shankar Mahadevan
4.	"He manke"	Kaviraj	Suma Shatry
5.	"Preethise"	V. Nagendra Prasad	Khusboo, Kunal Ganjawala
6.	"Makkar Maado"	Upendra	Upendra
7.	"M Andre"	Upendra, Kaviraj	Upendra

== Reception ==
R. G. Vijayasarathy of Rediff.com wrote that "Uppi Dada is certainly a watchable and well-made film for the viewers who have not seen the original but it may disappoint those who liked Munnabhai M B B S immensely". A critic from Viggy wrote that "Watch it if you haven't seen the original". A critic from webindia123 wrote that "Uppi Dada M.B.B.S. is certainly watchable and well-made. But it may disappoint viewers who have seen the original".
