= Love Maadi Nodu =

- Directed by: A. Subramanyam
- Written by: Upendra (dialogue)
- Story by: K. Bhagyaraj
- Based on: Andha 7 Naatkal (1981) by K. Bhagyaraj
- Starring: Kashinath; Master Manjunath
- Cinematography: B.C. Gowrishankar
- Music by: L. Vaidyanathan
- Release date: 1989
- Country: India
- Language: Kannada

Love Maadi Nodu ( transl. Try falling in love) is a 1989 Kannada-language film directed by A. Subramanyam. The film stars Kashinath as Mangaluru Manjunatha and Master Manjunath as his sidekick Gopi in main roles. Popular actor and director Upendra worked as an assistant in the film. It is a remake of 1981 Tamil film Andha 7 Naatkal.

== Plot ==
The story starts off with Sandhya (Srilatha) and Dr. Anand's (Shridhar) marriage. On their wedding night, Sandhya attempts suicide and is saved by Dr. Anand. He then inquires about her past. Sandhya tells him of her failed love affair with Mangalooru Manjunath (Kashinath). Mangalooru Manjunath is a poor Brahmin, naive, honest, aspiring music director with a huge family back home to support. His assistant Gopi is a kid wise beyond his age who has the knack of surviving in a big town. They move into an upper portion of the house where Sandhya lives with her grandfather, mother, sister, and a disabled brother. Initially, Sandhya sympathizes with Manjunath's unfortunate financial situation but eventually falls for his naive innocence and integrity in spite of his difficulties. Manjunath initially refuses Sandhya's advances fearing her family and his financial inability to support her but eventually accepts her love.

While their love is blossoming, Sandhya's parents get a proposal for Sandhya from a wealthy widower who wants to marry a middle-class lady who would take care of his daughter and be a good daughter-in-law to his ailing mother. Sandhya's grandfather and mother decide to marry her to the doctor. Sandhya refuses the proposal and decides to marry Manjunath at a temple the next day. Her family and other people from her neighborhood injure Manjunath and force Sandhya into a marriage with Dr. Anand. She explains to Dr. Anand that she is unable to change her heart and accept him as her husband.

Hearing of Sandhya's past, Dr. Anand decides that she should reunite with her lover and he will help her do that. He asks her to stay in his house for a week as his terminally ill mother is counting her last days. Sandhya agrees to this while Anand is looking for Manjunath in Kerala and in Bangalore. During her seven-day stay with Dr. Anand, she starts interacting with him, his mother, his daughter. When her husband finds and brings Manjunath to take Sandhya with him, she refuses to go and decides to stay with her husband. The movie ends with a famous line "My lover can become your wife but your wife can never become my lover. That is our culture".

== Cast ==
- Kashinath as Mangalooru Manjunath
- Master Manjunath as Gopi
- Srilatha as Sandhya
- Shridhar as Dr. Anand
- Kaminidharan
- Upendra as doctor (cameo)

== Soundtrack ==
S. No.	Song	Lyricist	Artist
1	"Bangalore Teenage Henne"	Upendra	S. P. Balasubrahmanyam, Manjula Gururaj
2	"Love Madu Madi Nodu"	Upendra	S. P. Balasubrahmanyam, Manjula Gururaj
3	"Ninna Nodo Aaseyali"	Upendra	S. P. Balasubrahmanyam, Manjula Gururaj
