= Mimicry Dayanand =

Indian actor

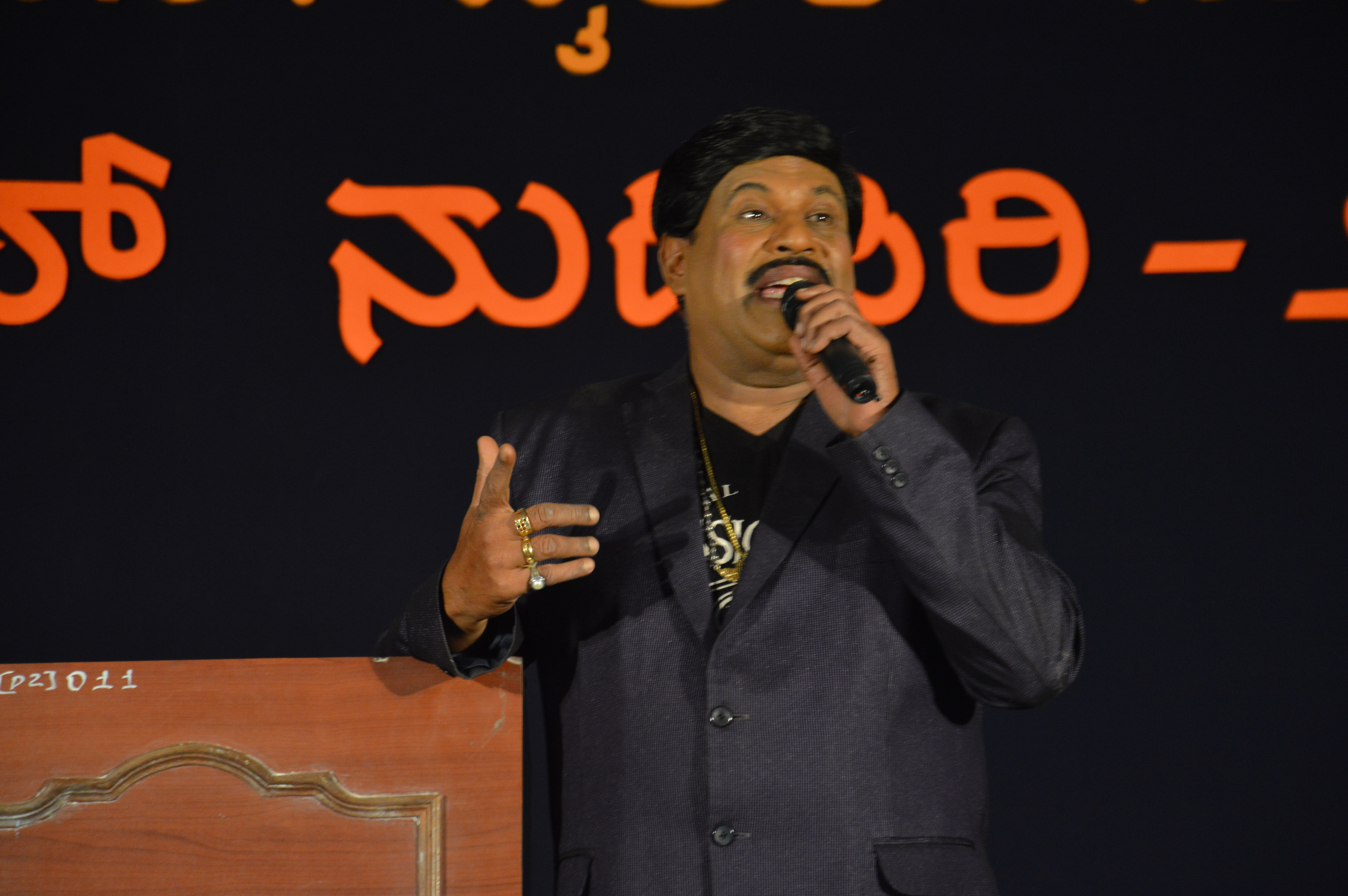
- Mimicry Dayanand
- Born: Dayanand Raman; Mysuru, Karnataka
- Occupations: Impressionist, Stand-up comedian, actor, television presenter
- Years active: 1990–current

Mimicry Dayanand is an Indian impressionist, stand-up comedian, actor and television presenter from the Karnataka state of India. He is renowned for his impression of politicians and film actors of Karnataka.

Dayanand has featured in many comedy albums and has presented a television show, Kachaguli that aired on ETV Kannada. In 2008, Dayanand, along with Sihi Kahi Chandru, judged a television show called Haasyada arasa, to unearth comic talents that was aired on Kasturi. He also appeared on the comedy chat show Maja With Sruja on the Colors Kannada Kannada channel, imitating Brahmanda Narendra Babu Sharma, a well-known astrologer.

== Filmography ==
=== Films ===
- Parashuram (1989)...M. Prabhakara
- Shhh! (1992)...Dayananda Theertha Swamiji
- Operation Antha (1995)
- Vishwa (1999)
- Y2K (2004)
- Ekadanta (2007)
- Lifeu Ishtene (2011)...Pinky Lal
- Nandeesha (2012)
- Colors in Bangalore (2013)
- Navarangi (2014)
- Uppi 2 (2015)...Swami Akhilananda
- Ishtakamya (2016)

=== Television ===
- Majaa Talkies (2018–present)
