= Raa (film) =

2001 film by K. S. Nageswara Ra

Raa...
- Film poster
- Directed by: K. S. Nageswara Rao
- Screenplay by: Upendra
- Produced by: Nallamalapu Srinivas (Bujji)
- Starring: Upendra; Priyanka Trivedi; Damini
- Edited by: Nandamuri Hari
- Music by: Gurukiran
- Production company: Sai Ram Art Movies
- Release date: 1 November 2001
- Country: India
- Language: Telugu
- Box office: ₹ 6 crore

Raa... (transl. Come!) is a 2001 Telugu-language romantic drama film starring Upendra, Priyanka Trivedi and Damini in the lead roles. The film was directed by K. S. Nageswara Rao, produced by Nallamalupu Bujji and has music composed by Gurukiran.

== Cast ==
- Upendra as Sridhar
- Priyanka Trivedi as Shanthi
- Damini as Dakshayani
- Sadhu Kokila as 'Triple X' Ranjith Kumar and Sridhar's friend
- Giri Babu
- L. B. Sriram
- Ananth
- Chitti Babu
- Ironleg Sastri
- Tirupati Prakash
- Siva Parvathi
- Gundu Hanumantha Rao
- Surya as Auto driver
- Ragini
- Alphonsa (special appearance in song)

== Soundtrack ==
The film's soundtrack has 5 songs composed by Gurukiran.

- "Pelladuta Rave" – S. P. Balasubrahmanyam
- "Yemito Yekkado" – Sukhwinder Singh
- "Antaru Antha Nannu" -
- "Raa Moham Dwesham" -
- "Ready 1234" – Udit Narayan

== Reception ==
Jeevi of Idlebrain.com rated the film one out of five and wrote that "This film is a third grade film that is made with a poor taste. Upendra is wasted in this role of Sri. Most of the scenes of the film are obscene and vulgar. Woman can never watch this film in public". Jeevi also wonder why the censor authorities passed some graphic scenes. Gudipoodi Srihari of The Hindu wrote that "Only Upendra and Priyanka dominate the drama. The rest simply fade away in this flimsy drama". Andhra Today wrote "The movie seems to have been made for a specific section of the audience and hence the cheap dialogue and titillation with scenes to match them and undue exposure attracting an 'A' certification. Nageswara Rao has repeated his past record and once again disappoints his audience with this movie with little substance and style. Upendra as college student looks awkward". Telugu Cinema wrote "All in all, Raa is a film that should be definitely given a miss, if for no other reason than to at least to save yourself some sick moments".

== Box office ==
The movie completed 100 days of run in Andhra Pradesh, was released in Karnataka and ran for 75 days in Bangalore. According to the film's producer Nallamalupu Bujji, Raa turned out to be a "minimum guarantee" hit at the box office.
