= Kanyadanam (1998 film) =

- Directed by: E. V. V. Satyanarayana
- Screenplay by: E. V. V. Satyanarayana
- Story by: Janardhana Maharshi
- Produced by: Ambika Krishna
- Starring: Srikanth; Upendra; Rachana
- Music by: Koti
- Release date: 10 July 1998
- Running time: 142 minutes
- Country: India
- Language: Telugu

Kanyadanam is a 1998 Indian Telugu-language drama film starring Srikanth, Upendra and Rachana Banerjee, directed by E. V. V. Satyanarayana and produced by Ambica Krishna. The film's story was written by Janardhana Maharshi and music was composed by Koti. The film was released on 10 July 1998 across Andhra Pradesh.

== Synopsis ==
The movie revolves around some bachelors who come to the city to find work. Venkat and Vandana fall for each other at their first encounter. But Vandana later marries Niwas. When Niwas learns that his wife actually loves Venkat, he arranges a marriage for both of them. The movie has a good blend of comedy scenes with Brahmanandam, situational background score and a nice story line. The movie has depicted the lover-boy role of Upendra, despite his eccentric image.

== Cast ==
- Srikanth as Niwas
- Upendra as Venkat
- Rachana as Vandana
- Vinod Bala as Madhu
- Sivaji as Seshu
- Rajeev Kanakala as Sarma
- Varsha
- Brahmanandam
- Kota Srinivasa Rao as Venkat's father
- Gokina Rama Rao as Raghava Rao
- Dubbing Janaki as Niwas' grandmother

== Production ==
Kanyadanam was Upendra's debut movie in Telugu along with Srikanth. The film explored the soft and romantic side of Srikanth and Upendra.

== Soundtrack ==
The film's music was composed by Koti.

No	Title	Singers	Lyricists
1	"Ayyayyo Ayyayyo"	K. S. Chithra, S. P. Balasubrahmanyam	Bhuvana Chandra
2	"Ediprema Charitraki"	K. J. Yesudas	Sirivennela Seetharama Sastry
3	"Kanivini Erugani"	S. P. Balasubrahmanyam	Sirivennela Seetharama Sastry
4	"Kanule Vethike"	K. J. Yesudas	Sirivennela Seetharama Sastry
5	"Bhalegundi Bhalegundi"	S. P. Balasubrahmanyam	Sirivennela Seetharama Sastry
6	"Ekkdundhi Nyayam"	K. J. Yesudas	Sirivennela Seetharama Sastry
7	"Singapur Singarale"	K. S. Chithra, S. P. Balasubrahmanyam	Bhuvana Chandra
8	"Gowliguda Lalaguda"	S. P. Balasubrahmanyam	Chandrabose

== Reception ==
A critic from Andhra Today wrote that "Kanyaadaanam is an out and out family entertainer, catering to the tastes of all sections. The theme being not very traditional, getting the audience to accept it mirrors the competence of the director. It is the story of two lovers whose reunion goes against the sanctity of marriage that people hold above everything".

== Box office ==
Kanyadanam was a box office success and was one among the hit Telugu films of 1998.
