= Gowramma =

- Directed by: Naganna
- Screenplay by: K. Vijaya Bhaskar
- Story by: Trivikram Srinivas
- Dialogues by: Upendra; Naganna
- Based on: Nuvvu Naaku Nachav (Telugu) (2001)
- Produced by: Shailendra Babu
- Starring: Upendra; Ramya
- Cinematography: Sai Sathish
- Edited by: S. Manohar
- Music by: S.A. Rajkumar
- Production company: Sri Shailendra Productions
- Release date: 3 June 2005
- Running time: 158 minutes
- Country: India
- Language: Kannada

Gowramma is a 2005 Indian Kannada-language romantic comedy film starring Upendra and Ramya in the lead roles. The film was directed by Naganna and produced by Shailendra Babu. The film is a remake of the Telugu film Nuvvu Naaku Nachav. This is the third among a series of successful films under Upendra – Naganna combination.

== Cast ==
- Upendra as Venkataswamy alias Venki
- Ramya as Gowri
- Srinivasa Murthy as Seenu, Father of Gowri
- Doddanna
- Ramesh Bhat as Shekhar
- Komal as Home chief Bunty
- Sadhu Kokila as Photographer
- Pavitra Lokesh
- Satyajit
- Ravi Chethan
- Suneetha Shetty
- Baby Raksha as Pinki
- Sumanth Shastri as Ashok
- Rekha Das
- Mandeep Roy
- Dr. Nagesh Kavati
- Samrat Rai
- Shivaji Rao Jadhav
- B. K. Shankar
- R. G. Vijayasarathy
- Myna Chandru

== Production ==
In 2004, Upendra approached Shailendra Babu to remake the 2001 Telugu film Nuvvu Naaku Nachav. As of April 2005, shooting for the film was complete except two songs, which were to be shot in Europe.

== Soundtrack ==
S. A. Rajkumar scored the music for the film while Upendra and Kaviraj penned the lyrics. The song "Kolthalallappo" is based on "Balamanemo" from Leela Mahal Center. The audio was launched at Palace Grounds, Bengaluru.

No.	Title	Lyrics	Singer(s)	Length
1.	"Kolthalallappo"	Upendra	Shankar Mahadevan	4:28
2.	"Nann Sona Sona"	Upendra	Shreya Ghoshal, Karthik	5:11
3.	"Aakashakke Chappara"	Kaviraj	Hariharan	4:51
4.	"Ondu Saari"	Kaviraj	Udit Narayan, K. S. Chithra	4:44
5.	"Baninda Jaari"	Kaviraj	Udit Narayan	4:49

== Release and reception ==
Gowramma received generally positive reviews from critics. Rediff.com praised Upendra's performance in the film and also stated that "Gowramma is an impressively enjoyable film, and a heavily recommended watch". The reviewer for Viggy.com praised the film and Upendra's performance, and stated that he looks different from his stereotype images in films such as A and Upendra. S. N. Deepak of Deccan Herald terms the film "a family entertainer" and commended Ramya's performance while praising the camera-work and dialogues. It was a commercial success at the box office. It made a record collection of Rs.1.25 crores in the first week.
