= Preethse =

- DVD cover
- Directed by: D. Rajendra Babu
- Written by: Somaraj (dialogues)
- Screenplay by: D. Rajendra Babu
- Story by: Honey Irani; Yash Chopra
- Produced by: Rockline Venkatesh
- Starring: Upendra; Shiva Rajkumar
- Cinematography: P. K. H. Das
- Edited by: Shyam Yadav
- Music by: Hamsalekha
- Production company: Rockline Entertainments
- Distributed by: Ramu Films
- Release date: 7 January 2000
- Running time: 147 minutes
- Country: India
- Language: Kannada

Preethse (transl. Love Me) is a 2000 Indian Kannada-language psychological thriller film starring Upendra, Shiva Rajkumar and Sonali Bendre. The film was directed by D Rajendra Babu and produced by Rockline Venkatesh. A major part of the film was shot in Australia as well. The film is a remake of the 1993 film Darr. The film was dubbed in Telugu as Sadist. Preethse was the second highest grossing Kannada film of the year 2000 behind Vishnuvardhan's Yajamana. It ran for 25 weeks and became Upendra's third consecutive blockbuster after A and Upendra.

== Plot ==
The film begins with Kiran (Sonali Bendre), a college student, returning home to her brother (Ananth Nag) and his wife (Vanitha Vasu) for Holi celebrations and being obsessively stalked along the way by Chandra (Upendra), her classmate who has a crush on her. Kiran's boyfriend Surya (Shiva Rajkumar) is a Commander (Special Forces) and is on a mission to free a child hostage from some terrorists on the high seas. Surya saves the child hostage. Surya's Captain is also the father of Chandra, Admiral Ashok Rao. Chandra tries to be friendly with Surya in order to be closer to Kiran.

When Kiran reaches home, she is continually stalked by Chandra on the phone. This causes much stress to herself and her family. He crashes Kiran's family's Holi celebrations incognito as a member of the band. Surya asks Kiran to offer the band some money for their performance, where Chandra, veiled in Holi colours, whispers "I love you, K-K-K-Kiran" to Kiran, which disturbs her greatly and a foot chase ensues to find the hooligan who's invaded their house, but Chandra soon disappears into the crowd.

When Chandra receives the news of Kiran and Surya's engagement, he tries to shoot and kill Surya when the couple is out shopping for a wedding ring. He misses his aim and Surya begins to chase him. Chandra narrowly escapes being recognized by Surya.

Kiran and Surya get married, but Chandra still refuses to give up on Kiran. He defaces the newly married couple's home with graffiti declaring his love, causing more distress to them. To get away from the stalker, Surya takes Kiran on a surprise honeymoon to Switzerland. Learning their location through devious means, Chandra turns up at their hotel in the Alps. Kiran recognizes him from college and the couple welcomes him to be part of their festivities. That very evening, Surya finds out from Kiran's brother that Chandra is the one who has been Kiran's stalker all along. He sends Kiran away on a boat and confronts Chandra. Chandra tries to run, but Surya catches up with him in a forest where they have a fight. Chandra stabs Surya with a knife after feigning surrender, and leaves him for dead. He then goes to the boat and tries to forcefully abduct Kiran; he wants to marry Kiran without her consent. But Surya comes back and brutally beats Chandra. While Surya is beating Chandra, Kiran tells Surya to kill Chandra which will give her a peaceful life. Those words will make Chandra realise that only his death will give Kiran a peaceful and happy life. He then proceeds to shoot himself with a gun and dies by saying "I LOVE YOU K-K-K-K-KIRAN". Kiran and Surya then return to India and reunite with their family.

== Cast ==
- Upendra as Chandru, Kiran's obsessed lover
- Shiva Rajkumar as Commander Surya, Kiran's fiancee (later husband)
- Sonali Bendre as Kiran, Surya's fiancee (later wife)
- Anant Nag as Vijay, Kiran's brother
- Vanitha Vasu as Poonam, Vijay's wife and Kiran's sister-in-law
- Srinath as Admiral - Chandru's father
- Tharakesh Patel
- K. V. Manjayya
- Bank Suresh

== Production ==
It marks Sonali Bendre's debut Kannada film and also reunited Shivrajkumar and Upendra after Om. Sunil Kumar Desai was originally chosen as the film's director. The filming was held at Australia.

== Soundtrack ==
- "Holi Holi" - S. P. Balasubrahmanyam, Rajesh Krishnan, Chitra, Anuradha Paudwal
- "Preethse Preethse" - Hemanth Kumar
- "Sye Sye Preethsye" - Hariharan, Anuradha Paudwal
- "Surya Obba" - Anuradha Sriram, Suresh Peters
- "Yaar Ittaree Chukki" - Hariharan, Anuradha Paudwal
- "Yaaru Illa" - Suresh Peters

== Reception ==
A critic from Rediff.com wrote that "On the whole, if you can switch your mind off these concerns and are just looking for an afternoon of mindless entertainment, full of loud music, melodrama, passion and fantasy, this movie is worth watching". Online Bangalore wrote "It is to the credit of Director D.Rajendra Babu to have changed some points from the original film to suit the taste of the present day audience and also to reduce the length of the movie by nearly 30 minutes. He has also extracted good performances from all the lead artists and the technical expertise that has gone into the making of the film, can only be termed as top class". Vani Nagendrappa of Indiainfo wrote "Director D Rajendra Babu has once again proved his merit. Talking about creativity maybe out of place in a scene to scene remake like this. With a few unplugged holes here and there, it is a good production, the first of its kind in Kannada moviedom".
