= Upendra (film) =

- Theatrical poster
- Directed by: Upendra
- Written by: Upendra
- Produced by: H.C. Srinivasa (Shilpa Srinivas)
- Starring: Upendra; Raveena Tandon; Prema; Damini
- Cinematography: A. V. Krishna Kumar
- Edited by: T. Shashikumar
- Music by: Gurukiran
- Production company: Srinivasa Productions
- Distributed by: Deewin Media
- Release date: 22 October 1999
- Running time: 138 minutes
- Country: India
- Language: Kannada
- Box office: ₹ 15 crore

Upendra is a 1999 Indian Kannada-language psychological drama thriller film written and directed by Upendra. It stars Upendra, Raveena Tandon, Prema and Damini. It is an allegorical film, which explores three human emotions through the relationship between the main character and the three heroines and touches upon Maslow's hierarchy of needs. The lyrics were written by Upendra and the music composed by Gurukiran. The film developed a cult fanbase and it is said that the director named it Upendra with the thought that the name includes the names of the main characters of the film (U for Upendra, P for Prema, D for Damini, and Ra for Raveena).

The film won Filmfare Award for Best Film (Kannada) and Filmfare Award for Best Director (Kannada). It was screened at the 30th International Film Festival of India in 1999 and the Yubari International Fantastic Film Festival in Japan in 2001. A sequel titled Uppi 2 was released in 2015.

== Plot ==
Betala begins to narrate one of his puzzling tales to Vikramāditya which is the story of Naanu (meaning I/Me/Myself), an ego-driven selfish rogue and the three women in his life. Naanu since childhood hates hypocrisy and always speaks the truth. In the process, he exposes the truth behind everything. A young woman, Rathi whose father, a swami is accosted by Upendra, exposes the hypocrisy of religion and his teachings. Thus, revealing his actual hatred towards his daughter. During this, Rathi falls in love with Naanu. However, she finds out that Naanu wants to marry a billionaire, Keerthi whose deceased father decides that her husband would inherit her entire wealth. He prints wedding cards and distributes them to all, including employees working in Keerthi's establishments. This angers Keerthi who orders her guardian, Marimuthu's son (who wants to marry her for the same reason) to attack Naanu. They bring a woman, Swathi, who lives in Naanu's house, and torture her. Naanu comes to her rescue and it is revealed that Swathi is Naanu's wife.

Rathi meets Naanu in person and confirms that Swathis is indeed his "wife". She threatens to kill both Swathi and Keerthi and herself if Naanu leaves her for either of them. He agrees, and Swathi leaves. Swathi later rescues the couple from Keerthi's henchmen and in turn, Naanu persuades her to return. She too threatens to kill Rathi and Keerthi if Naanu leaves her for any of them, to which Naanu agrees. He continues to be in a relationship with Rathi and hides it from Swathi and vice versa. However, his obsession with Keerthi never dies. He traps Marimuthu and after a turn of events, Keerthi eventually agrees to marry him. While they both are jubilant, Rathi and Swathi learn of his marriage to Keerthi and reach the harbor where the pair is currently hiding from the henchmen of Marimuthu. When they reach the harbor, Keerthi is informed about Naanu's plans and she drops her marriage plans with him. He then kidnaps all three women and kills Marimuthu and his son.

Naanu and the three women reach an old building where an injured Naanu threatens to kill all of them and forces all to be his life partners to which they do not agree. They are interrupted by a rich person who plans to have a party in the building, Gopala.

Gopala it turns out was advised by Naanu in the past to not follow behind women and instead focus on earning money, adding that women will run for you if you are a wealthy man. At the same time, he sees a once-wealthy man (who Naanu encounters throughout the movie) whose wealth is usurped by his girlfriends turning him into a poor man. This pushes Naanu into a dilemma. The three women, with rods in their hands, decide to kill Naanu. Betala stops the story here and asks Vikramāditya whether Naanu would survive or die in their hands. Vikramāditya understands the tale's intention and says that Naanu, Rathi, Swathi, and Keerthi are not actual people and instead represent the human ego, beauty, responsibilities, and money respectively. He concludes that Naanu (representing the self) should die and be reborn.

We go back to Naanu who then sees himself in a mirror and feels ashamed of his traits. He curses himself for pursuing all three women who never gave him any happiness. He realizes the importance of "Us" instead of "I" and decides that ego is the root cause of all issues. By tearing the shirt featuring an imprint of his face, he kills his inner ego and the feeling of "I". The three women disappear and Naanu, now silent and aimless, walks out of the building drenched in the rain.

== Cast ==
- Upendra as Naanu (translates to I/Me/Myself)
- Raveena Tandon as Keerthi (represents Money, her name also translates as windy)
- Prema as Swathi (represents Responsibility, her name also translates as rainy)
- Damini as Rathi (represents Beauty, her name also translates as summer)
- Sarojamma as Marimuthu
- Gurukiran as Nair
- Arun Govil as Vikramaditya
- V. Manohar as Rathi's father
- R. G. Vijayasarathy as media reporter
- Shankar Bhat as media reporter

== Production ==
The first schedule was held in Mangalore and the second schedule was held in Bangalore in March 1999 where the press conference scene with Raveena Tandon was canned.

== Themes and influences ==
The movie is a metaphorical reference to a man‘s quest for lust and fame without willing to assume any responsibilities. This theme is depicted in the form of assigning human forms to four feelings - ego (protagonist), commitment, lust and fame. The three heroines represent three stages in a man’s life - responsibilities, lust and fame while the hero himself is a representative of human ego.

It makes use of a concept Maslow’s hierarchy of needs - a person’s ego, once satisfied with basic needs, longs for companionship and when they gets that, they desire for recognition in the society only to leave everything for self-realization. The three feelings are further compared to three seasons - responsibilities to rainy season, lust to sunny season and fame to winter. This is only a broad outlook and each scene in the movie speaks about worldly life purely from the point of view of human ego satisfaction.

Further, the inter-relation between these feelings is depicted through interaction between the characters. Various issues relating to these feelings are used as sub plots - how the human ego yearns for fame to boost itself or how it is hurt when someone taunts that achieving fame is impossible or how commitments comes in between while running behind fame or how fame is not something unachievable or how people run behind fame only for the monetary benefits it offers. These ideas are represented by following sequences which happen with one of the heroines (who is wealthy) representing fame who is named Keerthi (literally meaning fame):

- When the hero says he needs to spend one night with her, it sounds chauvinistic the first time but what it actually meant was each individual desires to be famous at least for one day for his ego satisfaction that he has achieved something in life.
- Next the hero is beaten badly when he says the above because he is poor and she is wealthy. It actually symbolises the ego getting hurt when people mock at the desire to achieve something which is considered beyond one's reach.
- Next when he says - “Nobody wants her but they only want the wealth she brings” - it is assumed that the hero is saying that everyone is behind the heroine for her wealth but what he actually meant was - “Nobody wants fame but only the wealth which the fame fetches ”.
- Similarly, when he says Keerthi does not belong to anyone - the first time it is perceived as him telling to others that the heroine belongs to him too whereas what he actually means is that the fame does not belong to any one individual and it can be earned by anyone.
- The director brings in sequences where the hero says one cannot gain fame without taking care of responsibility (both represented through heroines). So everytime the hero is behind fame, responsibility appears first and asks to take care of her or sequences showing how commitment might look irksome and is not allowing to enjoy lust only to realize it was protecting from impending dangers(again represented by heroines).

== Soundtrack ==
Upendra wanted A.R. Rahman to compose for the film, so much so, that he met him and Mani Ratnam in the year 1997 - 98. Since he was busy after the success of Roja, Bombay and he was busy composing for Rangeela, Dil Se, Upendra then opted for Gurukiran. The music was composed by Gurukiran and lyrics penned by Upendra. After a decade he made A.R. Rahman to compose for his movie Godfather in 2012.

Upendra (Kannada)
No.	Title	Lyrics	Singer(s)	Length
1.	"Uppigintha Ruchi Bere Illa"	V. Manohar	Upendra	03:53
2.	"MTV Subbalakshmige"	Upendra	Udit Narayan	04:30
3.	"2000 AD Lady"	V. Manohar	Gurukiran	05:36
4.	"Enilla Enilla"	Upendra	Pratima Rao	04:32 l
5.	"Mastu Mastu Hudugi"	Upendra	Mano	04:19
6.	"Raveena"	V. Manohar	Rajesh Krishnan	05:22
Total length:				28:12

There is also a Telugu dubbed soundtrack.

Telugu tracklist
No.	Title	Singer(s)	Length
1.	"Mastu Mastu"	Mano, Chorus	03:53
2.	"Yamadoobu Yamadoobu"	Udit Narayan, Chorus	04:30
3.	"Uppuleni Aa Paapu"	S. P. Balasubrahmanyam, Chorus	05:36
4.	"Emundi Emundi"	K. S. Chithra	04:32
5.	"2000 AD Ladyi"	Gurukiran	04:19
6.	"Raveena"	Rajesh Krishnan	05:22
Total length:			28:12

== Release and reception ==
The film was dubbed in Telugu under the same name. The rights for the film for a release in Telugu were acquired by producer Ambika Krishna.

=== Critical reception ===
The film received positive reviews from critics upon release. Reviewing the film for Deccan Herald, Srikanth wrote, "The film ... hinges on one argument that the world is full of hypocrites. While most of them do not express themselves inside out, there are others like himself who express themselves outwardly, bravely, and rustically." Calling the film's screenplay "excellent", he further wrote, "Upendra has overdone his role as an actor, director, writer etc. Perhaps, we should see him as a director who puts himself in the middle of the action. Damini shines as the debutant girl. Raveena Tandon dashes off a touch of glamour. Prema is herself let down by the character." A critic from Sify wrote that "This film has generated tremendous curiosity right from its production stage and it seems to have justified the hype, the media has created. This film is a progression from Upendra’s A, defying any kind of categorisation. Director Upendra has proved his brilliance once again, bordering on the bizarre, in terms of filmmaking. It is unconventional and ends in an unexpected manner". Regarding the Telugu dubbed version, a critic from Zamin Ryot wrote that the director has shown the emotions of people in the form of human characters that are conversational in the most modern way with the flow of dialogue, although it seems vulgar here and there, the director has shown in bluntly, directly, and bitterly.

=== Box office ===
Upendra was a commercial success in Box office and was well received by the audience in Karnataka as well as in Andhra Pradesh. The film had a 200 days run in Karnataka and its Telugu version had a 100 days run in Andhra Pradesh.

== Awards ==
- Filmfare Award for Best Director (Kannada) (1999)
- Filmfare Award for Best Film (Kannada) (1999)

== Sequel ==
A sequel to the film titled Uppi 2 was launched on 18 September 2013 at Kanteerava Studios in Bangalore. The film became a commercial success.

== In popular culture ==
Jaggesh starred in a film called Jithendra (2001), which was against the concept of Upendra (1999). Nithin Krishnamurthy, the director of Hostel Hudugaru Bekagiddare (2023), said in an interview that "the way he made the film was so unique, and back then, I wasn’t able to understand it completely".
