= List of Majaa Talkies episodes =

This list of Majaa Talkies episodes consists of episodes from the 2015 format of the Colors Kannada television series Majaa Talkies.

== Series overview ==
Season	Episodes	Original release	Last aired
1	264	7 February 2015	29 October 2017
2	168	8 February 2018	6 October 2019
3	69	29 August 2020	4 July 2021

== List of Episodes ==
- Featured promotions are Kannada films, unless otherwise noted.

Legend: Normal One-Hour Episodes Two-Hour Special 'Mega Episodes' Two-Day Special Episodes Other Special Episodes and Spin-offs

=== Season 1 ===
==== Episodes 1 to 100 ====
No.	Telecast date	Guest(s)	Featured promotion	Notes
1	7 February 2015	Sharan	Raja Rajendra	
2	8 February 2015	Pooja Gandhi, Mano Murthy, Satish Pradhan	Abhinetri	
3	14 February 2015	Ajay Rao, Mayuri Kyatari	Krishna Leela	Valentine's Day Special Episode
4	15 February 2015	Jayram Karthik	Bangalore 560023	
5	21 February 2015	Parul Yadav, Rakshith Shetty, Yogaraj Bhat, Aishani Shetty	Vaastu Prakaara	
6	22 February 2015	Shubha Poonja, Rakesh Adiga, Jaggu Sirsi	Kotigond Love Story	
7	28 February 2015	No Guests	None	
8	1 March 2015	Arun Sagar, Anushree, Prathap Narayan, T K Dayanand	Benkipatna	
9	7 March 2015	V Harikrishna, Sruthi Hariharan, Dhananjay, A. P. Arjun	Rhaatee	
10	8 March 2015	Manjula Gururaj, Thara	None	Episode focused on Women's Day.
11	14 March 2015	Chiranjeevi Sarja, Madarangi Krishna, Chikkanna, Guru Deshpande	Rudra Tandava	
12	15 March 2015	S. Narayan, Pankaj, Pavan	Daksha	
13	21 March 2015	Ragini Dwivedi	None	Festive episode based on Ugadi celebrations.
14	22 March 2015	Mohan, Dattanna, Sowjanya, Bhoomika	Male Nilluvavarege	
15	28 March 2015	Gurukiran, Arjun Janya	None	Episode focused on Musicians.
16	29 March 2015	Prem Kumar, Amulya	Male	Last appearance of Ajji character.
17	4 April 2015	Om Prakash Rao, Nagshekhar, Chandan, Shravya, Vruksha	Katte	
18	5 April 2015	Chandini, Gurudath, Nayana, Dhanush, Veena Sundar	Khaidi	
19	11 April 2015	Yogaraj Bhat, Diganth, Ragini Dwivedi, Imran Sardhariya, Krish Joshi	Parapancha	
20	12 April 2015	T N Seetharam, Satyajih, Subramanya, Pratheek, Sunil, Deepti, Khushi	Hingyake Neeve Heli	
21	18 April 2015	Rajesh Krishnan, L. N. Shastri, Karthika	Melody	
22	19 April 2015	Rakshith Gowda, Nidhi Kushalappa, Jayanth Kaykini, Sudha Belavadi	Nan Love Track	
-	25 April 2015	V Ravichandran, Priyamani, Mayuri Upadhya, (also Akul Balaji as additional host)	None	Special episode to mark the launch of 'Colors Kannada' re-branding; aired as Dancing Talkies.
-	26 April 2015	V Ravichandran, Priyamani, Mayuri Upadhya, (also Akul Balaji as additional host)	None	Special episode to mark the launch of 'Colors Kannada' re-branding; aired as Dancing Talkies.
23	2 May 2015	Sanjjanaa, Naveen Krishna, Vaardhik Joseph	Mandya to Mumbai	Introduction of Muddesh in the main cast.
24	3 May 2015	Deepak Thimaya, Deepika Kamaiah, Ashwini Gowda	Neene Bari Neene	
25	9 May 2015	V Harikrishna, Amulya, Dinakar Thoogudeep, Kaviraj, Suraj Gowda	Maduveya Mamatheya Kareyole	Also official launch of the movie.
26	10 May 2015	V Harikrishna, Amulya, Dinakar Thoogudeep, Kaviraj, Suraj Gowda	Maduveya Mamatheya Kareyole	Also official launch of the movie.
27	16 May 2015	Vijay Raghavendra, Haripriya, Kuri Ranga	Rana Thanthra	
28	17 May 2015	Thilak, Yagna Shetty, Seeni	H/34 Pallavi Talkies	
29	23 May 2015	Ajith Hanumakkanavar, Jayaprakash Shetty, Prathima Bhat, Sowmya	None	Episode focused on News Anchors.
30	24 May 2015	Shashank Raj, Achyuth Kumar, Mayuri, Sridhar, Manju	Krishna Leela	Celebrating 50-day successful run of the film.
31	30 May 2015	Rachita Ram, Chikkanna, Nanda Kishore	Ranna	
32	31 May 2015	Rachita Ram, Chikkanna, Nanda Kishore	Ranna	
33	6 June 2015	Kiccha Sudeep, Rekha, Pooja Lokesh, Mayur Patel	Ranna	Episode included a special shadow play by Prahlad Acharya.
34	7 June 2015	Kiccha Sudeep, Rekha, Pooja Lokesh, Mayur Patel	Ranna	Episode included a special shadow play by Prahlad Acharya.
35	13 June 2015	Master Anand & Robo Family Team, Disha	None	Celebrating of 500 episodes of Robo Family aired on Colors Kannada.
36	14 June 2015	Shubha Poonja, Nagshekhar, Yathish, Anjana, Rakesh	Tharle Nann Makklu	
37	20 June 2015	V Ravichandran, Sudha Rani, Bhoomika Chawla, Nikesha Patel, Shakeela, Ravi Shankar	Luv U Alia	Also audio launch of the film.
38	21 June 2015	V Ravichandran, Sudha Rani, Bhoomika Chawla, Nikesha Patel, Shakeela, Ravi Shankar	Luv U Alia	Also audio launch of the film.
39	28 June 2015	Yogesh, Girija Lokesh, Hemanth, Shruthi	None	Episode to celebrate Srujan's birthday.
40	4 July 2015	Karunya Ram, Nabha Natesh, Shubra Aiyappa	Vajrakaya	Celebrating successful run of the film.
41	5 July 2015	Priyanka Upendra, Dinesh Baboo, Krupakar	Priyanka	
42	11 July 2015	Gangavathi Pranesh, Narasimha Joshi, Basavaraj Mahamani, Indumathi Salimath	None	Episode focused on Stand-up Comedians.
43	12 July 2015	Anup Bhandari, Nirup Bhandari, Kuri Prathap, Avantika Shetty, Radhika Chetan	RangiTaranga	
44	18 July 2015	Sathish Ninasam, Aishani Shetty	Rocket	
45	19 July 2015	Srinath, Padma Vasanthi	None	
46	25 July 2015	Sharan, Haripriya, Jayatheertha	Bullet Basya	
47	26 July 2015	Sharan, Haripriya, Jayatheertha	Bullet Basya	
48	1 August 2015	RJ Pradeep, RJ Nethra, RJ Sowjanya, RJ Rapid Rashmi	None	Episode focused on Radio Jockeys.
49	2 August 2015	Chikkanna, Ashok, Mithra, Aishwarya Sindhogi	Sapnon Ki Rani	
50	8 August 2015	Pratap Simha, Vishweshwar Bhat, Yashwant Sardeshpande	None	Episode focused on Journalism.
51	9 August 2015	Vinod Prabhakar, Srinivasa Murthy, Vinaya Prasad, Gayathri Iyer, Ramnarayan	Tyson	
52	15 August 2015	Darshan Thoogudeepa, Bullet Prakash	None	50th Episode Celebrations, Episode included a special painting performance by Vilas Nayak and a special shadow play by Prahlad Acharya.
53	16 August 2015	Darshan Thoogudeepa, Bullet Prakash	None	50th Episode Celebrations, Episode included a special painting performance by Vilas Nayak and a special shadow play by Prahlad Acharya.
54	22 August 2015	Chiranjeevi Sarja, Meghana Raj, Pavana Gowda, Yogish Dwarakish, Prakash Belawadi, Balaji Manohar, Arohitha, Anoop Seelin, K M Chaitanya, Ravi Shankar	Aatagara	
55	23 August 2015	Chiranjeevi Sarja, Meghana Raj, Pavana Gowda, Yogish Dwarakish, Prakash Belawadi, Balaji Manohar, Arohitha, Anoop Seelin, K M Chaitanya, Ravi Shankar	Aatagara	
56	29 August 2015	Ananthnag, Shruthi Hariharan, Chetan Chandra, Gadda Viji, Shalini Vadnikatti, Rithesh, Bharath B J	Plus	Episode included special Ranga-Geethe performance.
57	30 August 2015	Ananthnag, Shruthi Hariharan, Chetan Chandra, Gadda Viji, Shalini Vadnikatti, Rithesh, Bharath B J	Plus	Episode included special Ranga-Geethe performance.
58	5 September 2015	Jayram Karthik, Sanjjanaa, Rajeev, Tennis Krishna, Mimicry Gopi	Bengaluru 560023	
59	6 September 2015	Baraguru Ramachandrappa, Bhavya, Kumar Govind, Sundar Raj, Rajini, Muralidhar Halappa	Maranadandane	
60	12 September 2015	Kishore, Parvathy Nair, Poornachandra Tejaswi, Madhu Chandra	Vascodigama	
61	13 September 2015	Aishwarya Nag, Chetan Chandra, Raviteja, Srikanth	Jaathre	
62	19 September 2015	Upendra	Uppi 2	Celebration of Upendra's birthday Introduction of Rajini in the main cast.
63	19 September 2015	Upendra	Uppi 2	Celebration of Upendra's birthday Introduction of Rajini in the main cast.
64	3 October 2015	Chandan Kumar, Sangeetha Chauhan, Ninasam Prashanth	Luv U Alia	Second promotion for the movie on the show.
65	4 October 2015	Yogaraj Bhat, Pramod Panju, Sushmitha, Sindhu Lokanath, Manju Mithra	Geetha Bangle Store	
66	10 October 2015	Prajwal Devaraj, Devaraj, Sheethal Shetty, P C Shekar	Arjuna	
67	11 October 2015	A P Arjun, N Sandesh, Sindhu Lokanath	Mr. Airavata	
68	17 October 2015	Malashri	Ganga	Two-hour Special Mega Episode.
69	17 October 2015	Malashri	Ganga	Two-hour Special Mega Episode.
70	18 October 2015	Pavani (Anusha Rangnath), Dhanya (Deepika), Gowri (Ranjani Raghavan), Deepa (Kavya)	None	Episode focused on Colors Kannada serial actresses.
71	18 October 2015	Pavani (Anusha Rangnath), Dhanya (Deepika), Gowri (Ranjani Raghavan), Deepa (Kavya)	None	Episode focused on Colors Kannada serial actresses.
72	24 October 2015	Arun Sagar, Anushree, Shrunga, Shwetha	Ring Master	
73	31 October 2015	Sharmila Mandre, Dharma Keerthiraj, Raghava Murali, Praveen, Pavan	Mumtaz	
74	1 November 2015	Master Hirannaiah, Chandrashekhar Kambara	None	Special episode to celebrate Kannada Rajyothsava.
75	7 November 2015	Chiranjeevi Sarja, Amulya, Chandru, Prathap, Soundarya Jagadish	Ram Leela	
76	8 November 2015	Sanchari Vijay, P Sheshadri	Naanu Avanalla Avalu	Episode to celebrate National Awards.
77	14 November 2015	Arjun Sarja, Dhruva Sarja, A M R Ramesh	Game	75th Episode Celebrations.
78	15 November 2015	Arjun Sarja, Dhruva Sarja, A M R Ramesh	Game	75th Episode Celebrations.
79	21 November 2015	Chandrika (Rajeshwari), Anjali (Sukrutha), Radha, Kinnari (Disha)	None	Episode focused on serials (Agnisakshi and Kinnari) aired on Colors Kannada.
80	22 November 2015	Yogi, Mahesh, T P Siddaraju, Ambuja, Deepak Madhuvanahalli, Anoop Seelin, Mimicry Gopi	Bhagyaraj	
81	28 November 2015	Diganth, Kriti Kharbanda, Ranadeep, Mahesh	Minchagi Nee Baralu	
82	29 November 2015	Kishore, Thara, Yagna Shetty, Ashwini, Jogi Sunitha, Manohar Joshi, P Annayya	Octopus	
83	5 December 2015	Sriimurali	Rathavara	
84	6 December 2015	Shivadhwaj Shetty, Devadas Kapikad, Naveen D Padil	Chandi Kori, Chaali Polilu, Eregla Panodchi	Episode focused on Tulu Film Industry.
85	12 December 2015	M. D. Pallavi, Nanditha, Shamitha Malnad	None	Episode focused on Playback Singers.
86	13 December 2015	M S Umesh, Sanketh Kashi, Honnavalli Krishna, Madarangi Krishna, Vaishali Deepak, Milana Nagaraj, Shiva	Charlie	
87	19 December 2015	Anup Bhandari, Nirup Bhandari, Avantika Shetty, Radhika Chetan, Kuri Prathap, Karthik, Siddu Moulimani	None	Celebrating successful run of the film RangiTaranga (150 days).
88	20 December 2015	Anup Bhandari, Nirup Bhandari, Avantika Shetty, Radhika Chetan, Kuri Prathap, Karthik, Siddu Moulimani	None	Celebrating successful run of the film RangiTaranga (150 days).
89	26 December 2015	Siddharth (Vijay Suriya), Sannidhi (Vaishnavi Gowda)	None	Episode focused on serial (Agnisakshi) aired on Colors Kannada.
90	27 December 2015	Gurunandan, Tanishka Kapoor, Apoorva Gowda, Chinmayi, Kiran Ravindranath, Naresh Kumar, Amith	1st Rank Raju	
-	1 January 2016	Vijay Raghavendra, Spandana Vijay, Sangeetha Bhat, Kavitha Gowda(Lakshmi Baramma fame), Raghu Dixit, Members of The Raghu Dixit Project, DJ Alok and Team	Kismat	Special episode to celebrate the new year; aired as Majaa Party.
91	2 January 2016	Priyamani, Komal Kumar, Srinivas Raju	Kathe Chitrakathe Nirdeshana Puttanna	
92	3 January 2016	Prem Kumar, Raju Thalikote, Anuradha Bhat, Mohan Malagi, V Shekar	Mast Mohabbat	
93	9 January 2016	Dinakar Thoogudeep, Kaviraj, Amulya, Suraj Gowda, Shalini, Chitra Shenoy, Sangeetha Krish	Maduveya Mamatheya Kareyole	Second promotion for the film on the show, a video message from Darshan Toogudeep was aired.
94	10 January 2016	Yagna Shetty, Parul Yadav, Sanchari Vijay	Killing Veerappan	
95	16 January 2016	Haripriya, Rakshith Shetty, Rishab Shetty, Pramod Shetty	Ricky	Episode also included Haripriya in the show's script.
96	17 January 2016	Gowrish Akki, Ranganath Bharadwaj, Hameed Palya, Sanjjanaa, Vihaan Gowda, Manasa	Cinema My Darling	Episode focused on News Anchors.
97	23 January 2016	Mukhyamantri Chandru, Sihi Kahi Chandru, Sihi Kahi Geetha	None	
98	24 January 2016	Anish Tejeshwar, Aditi Rao, Krishi Thapanda, Naveen Reddy, Avinash, Bullet Prakash, B. Ajaneesh Loknath	Akira	
99	30 January 2016	Sushma Veer, Sunami Kitti, Jayashree, Krithika, RJ Nethra	None	Episode focused on Bigg Boss Kannada 3 contestants.
100	6 February 2016	Ravishankar Gowda, Manju Bhashini, Roopa Prabhakar, Prashanth, Sunetra Pandith, Namitha Rao, Sangeetha Gururaj	None	Episode focused on Silli Lalli

==== Episodes 101 to 200 ====
No.	Telecast date	Guest(s)	Featured promotion	Ref.
101	6 February 2016	Ravishankar Gowda, Manju Bhashini, Roopa Prabhakar, Prashanth, Sunetra Pandith, Namitha Rao, Sangeetha Gururaj	None	Episode focused on Silli Lalli
102	7 February 2016	Shiva Rajkumar, P Vasu, K A Suresh	Shivalinga	Celebration of 100 episodes of the show.
103	7 February 2016	Shiva Rajkumar, P Vasu, K A Suresh	Shivalinga	Celebration of 100 episodes of the show.
104	13 February 2016	Devaraj, Surya, Aqsa Bhatt, Raghu Mukherjee, Ratnaja, Raviraj, Danny	Preethiyalli Sahaja	
105	14 February 2016	Jai Jagadish, Vijayalakshmi Singh, Srinagar Kitty, Bhavana Belagere	None	Valentine's Day Special Episode
106	20 February 2016	Ajay Rao, Amulya, Sridhar V. Sambhram, Anil Kumar	Krishna-Rukku	
107	21 February 2016	Satish Pai, Santosh, Ashok	Play Kundapurada Mooru Muttugalu	
108	27 February 2016	Sadhu Kokila, Sumanth Shailendra, Shanvi Srivastava, Shailendra Babu	Bhale Jodi	
109	28 February 2016	Bharathi Vishnuvardhan, Aniruddha Jatkar, Keerthi Vishnuvardhan	Life of actor Vishnuvardhan	
110	5 March 2016	Ramesh Aravind, Loknath, Sunil Kumar Desai	...Re	
111	6 March 2016	Jagan, Kavya Gowda, Raviprasad Mandya, Sangeetha, Divya, Ramya	Television soaps Gandhari and Om Shanti Om Shakti	
112	12 March 2016	Shwetha Srivatsav, Sonu Gowda, Karunya Ram, Manasa Joshi, Sukrutha Wagle, D. Sumana Kittur, Girija Lokesh, Lakshmi Chandrashekhar	Kiragoorina Gayyaligalu	
113	13 March 2016	Shwetha Srivatsav, Sonu Gowda, Karunya Ram, Manasa Joshi, Sukrutha Wagle, D. Sumana Kittur, Girija Lokesh, Lakshmi Chandrashekhar	Kiragoorina Gayyaligalu	
114	19 March 2016	Shruti, Chandan Kumar, Rehman Haseeb, Mithra	Bigg Boss Kannada 3 contestants	
115	20 March 2016	Shruti, Chandan Kumar, Rehman Haseeb, Mithra	Bigg Boss Kannada 3 contestants	
116	26 March 2016	Dhananjay, Parul Yadav, Anoop Seelin, Pawan Wadeyar	Jessie	
117	27 March 2016	Praveen, Meghana Gaonkar, Hemanth, Suni, Ashu Bedra	Simpallag Innondh Love Story	
118	2 April 2016	Arun Sagar, Harini, Mohan Juneja, Bhajarangi Loki, Madhu Guruswamy, Vidya	Jai Maruthi 800	
119	3 April 2016	Vanitha Vasu, Chaitra H. G.	Playback singers of Item numbers	
120	9 April 2016	Sharan, Shubha Poonja, Shruthi Hariharan, Arjun Janya	Jai Maruthi 800	
121	10 April 2016	Sunil Puranik, Sringeri Ramanna, Padmaja Rao, Vijayamma, Namitha Kulkarni	Television soap Moodala Mane	
122	16 April 2016	Ashok Bassi, Jayashree Raj, Bhojraj	Doppelgangers of popular actors	
123	17 April 2016	Kasturi Shankar, B. R. Chaya, Sangeetha Katti	Playback singers	
124	23 April 2016	Chikkanna, Nikita Thukral, Vikram Arya, Venugopal	Thale Bachkolli Powder Hakkolli	
125	24 April 2016	Richard Louis, Sudha Baragur, Asad Ulla Baig	Stand-up Comedians	
126	30 April 2016	Tara, Sudha Murthy	Female achievers	
127	7 May 2016	Vijay Suriya, Kavya Shetty	Ishtakamya	
128	8 May 2016	Bhargavi Narayan, Sudha Belawadi, Prakash Belawadi, Samyukta Hornad	Actors from Belawadi family	
129	14 May 2016	Ragini Dwivedi, Anand P. Raju, Mass Mada	Ranachandi	
130	15 May 2016	Srinath, Geetha Srinath, Pragathi, P. H. Vishwanath	Suli	
—	15 May 2016	Apeksha (anchor for the episode)	Making of Majaa Santhe	
—	22 May 2016	Indu Nagaraj, Mayuri	Spin-off episode in conjunction with Serial Santhe; aired as Majaa Santhe	
126	21 May 2016		Choreographers in Kannada cinema	
127	22 May 2016	TBU	Television soap Mukta	
138	12 June 2016	Mukhyamantri Chandru, Kalpana Naganath, Srinivas, B. V. Rajaram	Play Mukhyamantri	
159	3 September 2016	H. G. Dattatreya, Vijaya Prasad, Hariprriya	Neer Dose	
162	18 September 2016	Shilpa Manjunath, Chandan Shetty, Neha Shetty	Mungaru Male 2	
170	23 October 2016	Ramya	Nagarahavu	
173	30 October 2016	Rachita Ram	Diwali special	
173	30 October 2016	Rachita Ram	Diwali special	
175	6 November 2016	Aditya, Rajendra Singh Babu		
178	8 January 2017	Prem Kumar, Diganth, Vijay Raghavendra, Prajwal Devaraj	Chowka	
200	January 2017	Darshan, Sharan, V. Manohar, Priyanka Upendra		

==== Episode 201 to 264 ====
No.	Telecast date	Guest(s)	Featured promotion	Ref.
201	19 February 2017	Jaggesh, Parimala	Melkote Manja	
202	25 February 2017	Raghu Dixit	Happy New Year	
203	26 February 2017	Gurunandan, Neha Patil, Raghu Samarth, Kavya Shetty	Smile Please	
204	4 March 2017	Kavitha Gowda, M. G. Srinivas, Nikhila Suman	Srinivasa Kalyana	
205	5 March 2017	Vijay Chandur, Pooja Gandhi, Yashas Soorya, Shankar	Jilebi	
206	11 March 2017	Shobha Karandlaje	International Women's Day	
207	12 March 2017	Ninasam Ashwath, Arya Mahesh, Kempegowda, Naina Sarwar, Yathiraj, Yogesh	Kolara	
208	18 March 2017	No guests	None	
209	19 March 2017	Adarsh Eshwarappa, Amrutha Karagada, Nivedhitha, Shashank Purushottam	Shuddhi	
210	25 March 2017	No guests	None	
211	26 March 2017	Tabla Nani, Mithra, P. C. Shekar	Raaga	
212	1 April 2017	Shwetha Pradeep, Skanda Ashok, Anusha Hegde, Sibu, Raksha	Television soap Radha Ramana	
213				
214				
215				
216				
