= Selfie Mummy Googl Daddy =

Indian Kannada film

Selfie Mummy Google Daddy
- Theatrical release poster
- Directed by: Madhuchandra R
- Written by: Madhuchandra R
- Produced by: Aakasha Butti Cinemas
- Starring: Srujan Lokesh; Meghana Raj; Babyshree; Master Alaap
- Cinematography: T. Ravindranath
- Edited by: Suresh Armugam
- Music by: Shamanth Nag
- Production company: Aakasha Butti Cinemas
- Distributed by: Vijay Cinemas
- Release date: 13 May 2022
- Running time: 115 minutes
- Country: India
- Language: Kannada

Selfie Mummy Googl Daddy is a 2022 Indian Kannada-language comedy-drama directed by Madhuchandra R. The film stars Srujan Lokesh and Meghana Raj alongside Babyshree and Master Aalap. This movie mainly gained positive responses.

This Kannada movie received three awards and the awards received are Best Family Feature Film Award at San Diego International Kids' Film Festival 2020, Special Jury Mention at Bengaluru IFF for Kannada Cinema Composition 2020 to the Director Madhuchandra R and another from Best Story by Sri Raghavendra Chitravani Film Awards 2023

== Cast ==
- Srujan Lokesh as Surya
- Meghana Raj as Shalini
- Achyuth Kumar
- Babyshree
- Master Alaap
- Dattanna
- Girija Lokesh
- Sundar Raj
- Sudha Baragur

== Release and reception ==
The film was released on 13 May 2022.

=== Critical reception ===
Jagadish Angadi of Deccan Herald rated the film three-and-a-half out of five stars and wrote, "The film's sense of humour works quite well. In a screenplay crowded with social concerns wrapped in the comedy genre, the writing at times displays a depth of understanding of nomophobia and its impact." Vinay Lokesh of The Times of India gave the film three out of five stars and wrote, "Director Madhu Chandra deserves credit for touching upon a subject which not many have explored, but the content lacks conviction. The chemistry between Srujan Lokesh and Meghana Raj works for the movie."
