= Lokesh (disambiguation) =

Lokesh is an Indian name that could refer to:

- Lokesh Kanagaraj, Indian film director
  - Lokesh Cinematic Universe, an Indian film franchise
- Lokesh, Indian actor in Kannada cinema
  - Lokesh Productions, a film production company
- Nara Lokesh, Indian politician
