= GST (film) =

Indian Kannada-language comedy horror film

- Theatrical release poster
- Directed by: Srujan Lokesh
- Screenplay by: Srujan Lokesh
- Story by: Srujan Lokesh
- Produced by: N. Sandesh
- Starring: Srujan Lokesh; Rajani Bharadwaj
- Cinematography: Gundlupete Suresh
- Edited by: Ganesh Mallaiah
- Music by: Chandan Shetty
- Production companies: Sandesh Productions; Lokesh Productions
- Distributed by: Jayanna Films
- Release date: 28 November 2025
- Running time: 132 minutes
- Country: India
- Language: Kannada

GST, marketed as GST (Ghosts in Trouble) is a 2025 Indian Kannada-language comedy horror film written and directed by Srujan Lokesh in his feature directorial debut. Produced under Lokesh Productions and Sandesh Productions by N. Sandesh, the film stars Srujan Lokesh and Rajani Bharadwaj in the lead, with an ensemble that includes Girija Lokesh, Sharath Lohitashwa, Vinaya Prasad, Shobaraj, Tabla Nani, Ravishankar Gowda, Girish Shivanna, and Niveditha Gowda.

Music is composed by Chandan Shetty, with cinematography by Gundlupete Suresh and editing by Ganesh Mallaiah. The film received a U/A certificate and released theatrically across Karnataka on 28 November 2025. It Began Digitally Streaming from February 13, 2026 on Prime Video in Kannada, Hindi, Tamil and Telugu.

== Premises ==
Lucky (Srujan Lokesh), branded the "unluckiest man alive," spirals after his mother's death and attempts suicide—only to discover that a group of quirky, friendly ghosts keep saving him for a reason: they need help attaining salvation by completing their unfinished business. As Lucky begins to see (and be guided by) the ghosts, he finds unexpected love with Nidhi (Rajani Bharadwaj). Learning that the ghosts perished in a prior financial crisis, Lucky teams up with them to plan a chaotic, comedic bank heist aimed at setting things right and giving them peace. Whether Lucky can turn lifelong misfortune into a miracle forms the heart of the story.

== Cast ==
- Srujan Lokesh as Lucky
- Rajani Bharadwaj as Nidhi
- Girija Lokesh
- Vinaya Prasad
- Ashok
- Shobaraj
- Tabla Nani
- Ravishankar Gowda
- Samhita Vinya
- Sharath Lohitashwa
- Sundar Veena
- Veena Sundar
- Girish Shivanna
- Vishal Hegde
- Aravind Rao
- Vinod Gobbragala
- Niveditha Gowda
- Sukruth Srujan Lokesh
- Nishitha Gowda
- Rajath Kishan
- Hanumanthe Gowda
- Roopashree
- Mahanthesh Hiremath
- Sriharsha Gobhatt
- Arun Ramadas
- Ramya

== Production ==
=== Development ===
Srujan Lokesh, widely known for Majaa Talkies, announced GST as his directorial debut in late 2025, positioning it as a family-friendly comedy-thriller with a playful twist on the ghost genre ("ghosts in trouble rather than humans"). The film is produced by N. Sandesh under Sandesh Productions with Lokesh Productions as co-banner.

Lokesh leads the ensemble as Lucky, pairing with Rajani Bharadwaj. The supporting cast includes veteran Girija Lokesh, Sharath Lohitashwa, Vinaya Prasad, Shobhraj, Tabla Nani, Ravishankar Gowda, Girish Shivanna, and social-media personality Niveditha Gowda. Notably, three generations of the Lokesh family — Girija Lokesh, Srujan, and Sukruth Srujan Lokesh—appear in the film, which Srujan highlighted as a personal milestone.

=== Marketing ===
The official trailer was launched mid-November 2025, with Real Star Upendra unveiling the trailer and Priyanka Upendra releasing a song promo at a high-profile event. Public TV segments promoted the film's family-friendly angle, and Times of India's ETimes carried the trailer. The film's tagline "Ghost in Trouble" was prominently used across digital campaigns.

=== Filming ===
The movie's shooting was completed by August 2024, as confirmed by production updates. Key filming locations included Kabini, specifically at a new resort owned by producer Sandesh, where a major song featuring Srujan Lokesh and Rajani Bharadwaj was shot. Mysore where another song sequence was filmed with Srujan Lokesh, Tabla Nani, Girish Shivanna, and Vinod Gobbargal. The final schedule involved shooting two songs choreographed by Muruganand, marking the wrap-up of principal photography.

== Music ==
GST

Soundtrack album by Chandan Shetty
- Released: 2025
- Recorded: 2024
- Genre: Feature film soundtrack
- Length: 11:30
- Language: Kannada
- Producer: Chandan Shetty

The soundtrack and background score are composed by Chandan Shetty. In promotional interviews and event coverage, Srujan Lokesh announced launching Lokesh Music to release songs from GST. A preview for the single "Chameli" was highlighted during the trailer event (promoted to release on 14 November 2025). Further song details were teased across social posts and coverage leading to release.

Track listing
No.	Title	Lyrics	Singer(s)	Length
1.	"Chameli Chal"	Vijay Eshwar	Chandan Shetty, Anitha Sara Mahesh	4:05
2.	"Thaayi Devare"	V. Nagendra Prasad	Sadhu Kokila	3:25
3.	"GST Theme Anthem"	Vijay Eshwar	Chandan Shetty	3:25
Total length:				11:30

== Release ==
GST (Ghosts in Trouble) was certified U/A and released in theatres on 28 November 2025, with a listed runtime of approximately 2 hours 11 minutes (131 minutes). Major listings and ticketing platforms featured the synopsis and cast ahead of the opening. GST movie now streaming on Prime Video in Kannada, Hindi, Tamil and Telugu.

== Critical reviews ==
Early reviews were mixed. OTTplay rated the film 2/5, calling it "an extended version of Majaa Talkies," appreciating some gags but finding many others uneven, while noting the friendly-ghost premise and questioning the narrative logic of how ghosts interact with the world.
