= Dancing Champion =

Kannada language TV soap opera

- Genre: Dance
- Created by: Parameshwar Gundkal
- Presented by: Akul Balaji
- Judges: Mayuri Upadhya; Vijay Raghavendra; Meghana Raj
- Opening theme: Dancing Champion Dancing Champion
- Country of origin: India
- Original language: Kannada
- No. of episodes: 23

Production
- Producer: Lokesh Productions
- Production location: Bengaluru
- Cinematography: Arun Bramha
- Camera setup: Multi-camera
- Running time: 60-75 minutes
- Production company: Viacom 18

Original release
- Network: Colors Kannada
- Release: 8 January 2022 – present

Related
- Ede Thumbi Haaduvenu (2021); Nannamma Super Star

Dancing Champion is a Kannada dance reality show aired on Colors Kannada and streamed on Voot. It features celebrities as contestants who are paired with professional dancers competing for a cash prize and the title Dancing Champion. The judges of the show are Mayuri Upadhya, Vijay Raghavendra and Meghana Raj. The show is hosted by Akul Balaji. The show premiered on 8 January 2022.

== Production ==
The show is a competition where a 14 celebrities are paired with exceptionally talented common people, handpicked from all across Karnataka. Well-known faces & fresh ones pair-up for a phenomenal dance-off. Contestants dance to a different tune, different theme and different styles every week and scores are given by the judges. Each week one couple is eliminated based on their scores with only one pair having the chance to be finally crowned, Dancing Champion. The show is produced by actor Srujan Lokesh under his banner Lokesh Productions.

=== Creative Team ===
- Prakash Gopikrishna
- Lakshmi Sagar
- Prabha Ram
- Ravi Shankar
- Ramya Krishna
- Akshay

=== Technical Team ===
- Deepak Singh (Supervisor Choreographer)
- Elton Mascarenhas (Assistant Supervisor Choreographer)
- Namit (Light Jockey)
- Sampath Sukhine (Video jockey)
- Puneet (Switcher)
- Rajesh (Online Editor)
- Saish Bharadwaj (Music Producer/Programmer)
- Murugan
- Pruthvi (Art Director)
- Hemanth Kumar (Art Department)
- Manikant (MI Bar Controller)
- Prem (Multi Recorder)
- Pradeep (Sound Engineer)
- FMC Camera Team
- Manju (Electrician)

=== Choreographer ===
- Varadharajan
- Tharak Xavier
- Jai
- Ambari Raju
- Surya
- Suchin
- Jaggi
- Anil
- Sudhir
- Bala Narasimha

=== Costume & Make Up ===
- Rajesh Shetty (Costume Designer)
- Ajit (Celebrity Costume Designer)
- Roshan Ayyapa (Celebrity Costume Designer)
- Kumar (Make Up Artist)
- Salam (Special Make up Artist)

=== Production Team ===
- Shiva (Production Controller)
- Prasanth Harry
- Ramaya Bhaswaraj
- Nagendra
- Teju
- Bhaswaraj
- Suchin
- Kiran Gowda

== Contestants ==
A total of 14 celebrity couples, mostly TV actors are part of the show.

#	Celebrity	Partner
1	Chandan	Bhoomika
2	Chandana Ananthakrishna	Akshatha
3	Aishwarya Sindogi	Shiva
4	Aradhya	Niveditha
5	Anvitha Sagar	Nikhil
6	Anmol	Aditya
7	Saniya Iyer	Nihal
8	Arjun Yogi	Rani
9	Ishithavarsha	Shiva
10	Vinod	Karunya
11	Aarthi	Sagar
12	Amrutha Murthy	Ravish
13	Vasanth Kumar	Prema
14	Suraj Hollu	Haneesha

== Weekly summary ==
Week No.	Episode No.	Original Air Date	Couple Evicted Rank	Theme
1 Grand Premiere	1; 2	8 January 2022; 9 January 2022	—N/a	Introduction
1 Grand Premiere	Celebrity couples were introduced with couple performances.			
2	3; 4	15 January 2022; 16 January 2022	—N/a	Celebration Round
2	The theme bought the festive spirit on the stage; Ace actor Sashikumar was invited as the guest for the show.			
3	5; 6	22 January 2022; 23 January 2022	—N/a	Self Challenge Round
3	The contestants perform to the fullest of their capabilities in this round.; Actor Sharan was invited as the guest for the round and to promote his film Avatara Purusha.			
4	7	30 January 2022	Suraj Hollu & Haneesha; Rank 14	Costume Drama Round
4	The contestants wear different costumes and narrate the story through their dance performances.; Srujan Lokesh and Nannamma Super Star kids joined for the Mahasanchike episode as guests.			
5	8 9	5 February 2022 6 February 2022	Vasanth Kumar & Prema; Rank 13	Dance Style Round
5	The contestants performed different dance styles present across India and world.; The performances were power-packed from one contestant to the other.			
6	10 11	12 February 2022 13 February 2022	—N/a	Romantic Round
6	The contestants performed romantically with their partners.; The round did induce some chemistry between the couple.			
