= Guru (2012 film) =

2012 Indian film by Jaggesh

- Theatrical release poster
- Directed by: Jaggesh
- Written by: Mohan Shankar (dialogues)
- Screenplay by: Jaggesh
- Story by: Santha Kumar
- Produced by: Parimala Jaggesh
- Starring: Gururaj; Rashmi Gautham
- Cinematography: Ramesh Babu
- Edited by: K. M. Prakash
- Music by: Vinay Chandra
- Production company: Gururaj Films
- Release date: 16 November 2012
- Running time: 130 minutes
- Country: India
- Language: Kannada

Guru is a 2012 Indian Kannada-language action film directed by Jaggesh. The film starred his son Gururaj and Rashmi Gautham. The film was Jaggesh's first film as a director. It is a remake of the Tamil-language film Mouna Guru.

== Cast ==
- Gururaj as Guru
- Rashmi Gautham as Ankitha
- Srinivasa Murthy
- Yatiraj as Yathi
- Abhijit
- Shobaraj as ACP Bopaiah
- Sudharani as Tejaswini

== Production ==
The film was actor Jaggesh's debut as a director and said that he took up the project on his son's insistence as a launchpad to the latter. The film was produced under the then-launched banner by Jaggesh, Gururaj Films.

The story for the film was chosen by Jaggesh, who also wrote the script for the film. Speaking of the film, he said, "Guru will be a commercial film, but will not have a routine story. You will get the retro feel with this film. Such incidents would have occurred in everybody's life". To prepare for his role in the film, Gururaj underwent training in kickboxing and other martial arts for a period of five and a half months in Cambodia. The film was launched in Mantralayam in May 2012, before filming that began in June 2012.

== Soundtrack ==
Guru

Soundtrack album by Vinay Chandra
- Released: 25 September 2012
- Genre: Feature film soundtrack
- Length: 16:14
- Label: Ashwini Audio

Vinay Chandra composed the music for the soundtracks, and lyrics written by Ramnarayan and Kaviraj. The album consists of four soundtracks.

Tracklist
No.	Title	Lyrics	Singer(s)	Length
1.	"Ankitha"	Ramnarayan	Karthik, Anuradha Bhat	4:16
2.	"Enu Papa Madide"	Kaviraj	Rajesh Krishnan	3:31
3.	"Guru"	Ramnarayan	Jaggesh	3:44
4.	"Manase"	Kaviraj	Vinay Chandra	4:43
Total length:				16:14

== Reception ==
=== Critical response ===
A critic from The Times of India scored the film at 3.5 out of 5 stars and says "Full marks to Gururaj who has given a matured performance with expression and dialogue delivery. Rashmi is impressive. Srinivasamurthy is gracious. We have excellent numbers from music director Vinayachandra. Cinematography by Ramesh Babu is quite good". Srikanth Srinivasa from Rediff.com scored the film at 2.5 out of 5 stars and wrote "Ramesh Babu's camera work is splendid and Vinay Chandra's music is breezy. Guru is worth a watch for the breezy narrative and some surprisingly well shot scenes and slick editing". A critic from News18 India wrote "Ramesh Babu comes off good through his cinemetographic work with apt lighting, while music by Vinay Chandra is okay. The editing could have been sharper. 'Guru' is a one time watch, but Jaggesh and Gururaj have failed to meet the expectations of fans". A critic from Bangalore Mirror wrote "Among other actors, veterans Srinivas Murthy and Shobraj give good performances, but another veteran Sudharani does not fit the role of an investigation officer. Ramesh Babu’s camera work is spectacular while young Vinay Chandra delivers a few hit numbers".
