= Gururaj Jaggesh =

Indian actor

- Born: 1987 (age 38–39); Bangalore, Karnataka, India
- Occupations: Actor, filmmaker, screenwriter
- Years active: 1994, 2002, 2007–present
- Spouse: Katie Pyle (m. 2014)
- Children: Arjun
- Parent(s): Jaggesh (father); Parimala Jaggesh (mother)
- Relatives: Komal (Uncle); Yathiraj Jaggesh (brother)

Gururaj Jaggesh is an Indian actor who predominantly works in Kannada cinema. He is known for his 2009 film Gilli, a remake of the Tamil film 7G Rainbow Colony. In recent years, he has also written and directed under the banner Raj Brothers, a partnership with his brother Yathiraj Jaggesh.

== Career ==
He made his debut as the story writer for his father Jaggesh's Makeup (2002). He first appeared as a lead actor in Gilli (2009) before starring in Guru (2012) under his father's direction.

=== Transition to direction ===
Gururaj Jaggesh has stated that he intends to move from acting into writing and directing. With his brother Yathiraj Jaggesh, he formed the filmmaking partnership Raj Brothers. The duo's announced directorial debut is R2, described as a pan-Indian action thriller starring Ragini Dwivedi.

== Personal life ==
Gururaj Jaggesh is the son of actor Jaggesh and Parimala Jaggesh. He is also connected to AlaMirap Nutrition Private Limited, a Bengaluru-based nutrition company; corporate filings list him as a director from 1 September 2020.

== Filmography ==
Year	Film	Role(s)	Notes	Ref.
1994	Beda Krishna Ranginata	—	—	
2007	Thamashegagi	—	—	
2009	Gilli	Guru "Gilli"	—	
2012	Guru	Guru	—	
2012	Sankranthi	Suri	—	
2015	Paipoti	Gururaj	—	
2017	Mass Leader	Guru	—	
2019	Vishnu Circle	Vishnu	—	
2021	Kaage Motte	Krishna	—	
