= Samhita Vinya =

Indian film actress

- Born: Manasa; Sakleshpur, Karnataka, India
- Occupation: Actress

Samhita Vinya is an Indian actress who predominantly appears in Kannada films.

== Early life and career ==
Samhita Vinya was born in Sakleshpur town of Karnataka state. Later she moved to Bangalore. In 2014, Samhita was crowned as Miss Karnataka and Miss Glamour Diva in the year 2015.

Samhita Vinya made her acting debut with the Kannada film Haalu Thuppa in 2017, where she played a social activist village girl role. In 2018, She got her second film released Amrutha Ghalige and played a role of an infertility women. In 2019 Samhita Vinya worked as a lead role in Kannada film "Vishnu Circle".

In 2020, she played a role of a widow in Seethamma Bandalu Sirimallige Thottu.

== Filmography ==
†	Denotes films that have not yet been released

Year	Film	Role	Language	Note
2017	Haalu Thuppa	Lacchi	Kannada	
2018	Amrutha Ghalige	Dhakshayaini	Kannada	
2019	Vishnu Circle	Aakruthi	Kannada	
2020	Seethamma Bandalu Sirimallige Thottu	Seethamma	Kannada	
2025	GST		Kannada	
2026	Magestic 2		Kannada	
TBA	Goudhara Dharbar †	Lakshmi	Kannada	Filming
TBA	You Are My Hero †	Anamika	Telugu, Tamil, Kannada, Malayalam, Hindi	Filming
TBA	Karab Duniya †	Sindu	Kannada	Filming

=== Short Movies ===
Year	Film	Role	Language
2019	Suthradhari	Preethi	Kannada
