= Thangigagi =

- DVD Cover
- Directed by: P. N. Satya
- Story by: Perarasu
- Based on: Thirupaachi (Tamil)
- Produced by: Anitha Kashyap
- Starring: Darshan; Poonam Bajwa; Shwetha Chengappa; Rangayana Raghu
- Cinematography: Anaji Nagaraj
- Edited by: S. Manohar
- Music by: Sadhu Kokila
- Production company: Sri Padma Chithra
- Release date: 20 October 2006
- Running time: 145 minutes
- Country: India
- Language: Kannada

Thangigagi (English: For younger sister) is a 2006 Indian Kannada-language action drama film directed by P. N. Satya and produced by Anitha Kashyap. The main cast includes Darshan, Poonam Bajwa and Shwetha Chengappa, besides Avinash and Rangayana Raghu in other pivotal roles.

The film is a remake of the 2005 Tamil film Thirupaachi. The film mainly displays the brother — sister sentiments with action backdrop. Released on 20 October 2006, it was panned by critics as a poor remake and eventually failed at the box office. This movie was dubbed in Hindi As Vajra - The Bull.

== Plot ==
Veerabhadra is a blacksmith lives in a remote village. He has a sister named Gowri. He seeks a groom for his sister. Veerabhadra confides to his friend Baswa that he wants to his sister to be in a good city after her marriage. Veerabhadra nods his acceptance when a city guy proposes to Gowri. He accompanies the newlyweds to Bangalore and finds a girl named Priya welcoming them, and they both fall in love despite initial mishaps.

On a trip to Bangalore, Veerabhadra saves a court witness from Pattake Balu, a don dominating central Bangalore. He also learns of a local don Pan Parag Ravi, who controls northern Bangalore and troubles Gowri's husband's canteen business. In an altercation at the cinema theater, Baswa gets murdered by a thug Shadeshwara who dominates south Bangalore. Gowri's husband told Veerabhadra to leave the Bangalore if he wants his sister to be happy. After Baswa's funeral he leaves his hometown stating that he got a job in a cloth manufacturing company. In reality, he comes with mission in Bangalore.

Veerabhadra warns Shadeshwara, stating that the latter will be killed by him. He also calls ACP Chandrashekhar and warns him that he will kill all the dons in Bangalore, as the police department fails in the duty. Later on, Veerabhadra's friend Shankar, who is a police inspector who learns about this. Veerabhadra challenges Shankar that he will give up his mission if the latter keeps anyone thug of Bangalore in jail at least for a single day. Shankar fails in his mission and loses his son, as he was killed by Balu.

This harsh lesson makes Shankar help Veerabhadra. Thus, Shankar lists Veerabhadra the entire mafia network of Bangalore by providing the specification of who leads the various area. Veerabhadra writes their names in the paper and randomly chooses Pattake Balu. He kills Balu stating that he is not killing instead 'clearing'. Priya meets Veerabhadra in a temple and finds that he is not working in any cloth manufacturing company. Veerabhadra manages to make Priya believe that he is working in a travels company. Thus, Priya gets promise from Veerabhadra that he should meet her and spend time with her frequently.

Later on, Veerabhadra provokes Ravi to kill his own brother by sticking funeral posters of Ravi and making him think that his brother is the person who is killing people all over Bangalore. After the death of Ravi's brother, Ravi realises his brother is not the one who stuck the funeral posters, so he hides himself in a politician's house to be away and safe from the hands of Veerabhadra. The politician damages his car and house and makes the police believe that someone has attacked his house. The police decides to provide security for the politician. This makes Ravi feels happy, considering that Veerabhadra can't come to his place by fooling all these inspectors and kill him. Shankar soon found out that Ravi is hiding in the politician's place.

Veerabhadra wants Shankar to disband the police protection, but Shankar refused because that is the police's responsibilities to protect. He can only inform Veerabhadra, who has to kill Ravi. Later on, Veerabhadra brings a group of people who rally due losing their money to the fraud financier who is hiding in the politician's place. With the rally, Veerabhadra enters Ravi's fort and kills him. Chandrashekhar inquires the people that involve the rally regarding identity of Veerabhadra. However, nobody wants to tell anything because Veerabhadra is doing the police's job while the police do nothing and wait for their salary. Chandrashekhar's daughter is willing to die then reveal Veerabhadra's identity because she was rescued by Veerabhadra from balu.

Later on, Veerabhadra decides to kill Shadeshwara, and warns him. This makes Shadeshwara seek the protection of mass group of thugs from Bangalore. He ignites the war between police group and mafia gang in a very diplomatic manner. Veerabhadra disguises himself as police inspector and enter's Shadeshwara's fort. Shankar helps Veerabhadra in his mission by hurting himself. Chandrashekhar orders his squad to hit the thugs.

Veerabhadra enters the house in a police uniform, confronts a thug, and forces him to wear a police uniform. After that, Veerabhadra shoots and kills the thug and throws him out of the window. Thinking that one of his fellow officers is dead, Chandrashekhar orders for open fire. all the thugs were killed, but when they checked the dead 'police officer' they realise Veerabhadra's trick and upstairs to find him. However, Veerabhadra already stabbed Shadeshwara and threw him to the ground right before the birth of a new year. Finally, Veerabhadra surrenders to the police but releases after six months. Priya welcome's Veerabhadra, Gowri and her husband once again after returning home. Veerabhadra gives Priya the necklace that he is wearing, and they unite at the end.

== Cast ==
- Darshan as Veerabhadra
- Poonam Bajwa as Priya
- Shwetha Chengappa as Gowri
- Rangayana Raghu as Shadeshwara
- Avinash as ACP Chandrashekhar
- Bullet Prakash as Baswa
- Bank Janardhan as Marriage broker
- M.N Lakshmi Devi as Veerabhadra and Gowri's grandmother
- Chitra Shenoy as Veerabhadra and Gowri's mother
- Tharakesh Patel as Inspector Shankar
- Bullet Krishna as Pan Parag Ravi
- Vishwas Bharadwaj as Pattake Balu

== Production ==
Poonam Bajwa made her Kannada debut with this film.

== Soundtrack ==
The music of the film was composed by Sadhu Kokila. The songs "Anna Thangi" and "Onde Ondu" is based on "Enna Thavam" and "Appan Panna" from Tirupaachi. The song "Bittu Bittu" is based on "Pattu Pattu" from Shankar Dada MBBS.

Thangigagi

Soundtrack album by Sadhu Kokila
- Released: 2006
- Genre: Feature film soundtrack
- Label: Ashwini Audio

No.	Title	Lyrics	Singer(s)	Length
1.	"Onde Ondu"	A. P. Arjun	Rajesh Krishnan, Anuradha Sriram
2.	"Dina Dina"	A. P. Arjun	Kunal Ganjawala, Shamitha Malnad
3.	"Bittu Bittu"	A. P. Arjun	Udit Narayan, Malathi
4.	"Vandane"	Doddarangegowda	Hemanth
5.	"Anna Thangi"	A. P. Arjun	Madhu Balakrishnan

== Reception ==
R. G. Vijayasarathy of Rediff.com rated the film one-and-a-half wrote that "Thangigaagi will end up as disappointing fare for Kannada moviegoers looking for a bright Diwali release". A critic from IANS rated the film two-and-a-half stars and wrote that "Thangigaagi will end up as a disappointing fare".
