= Makeup (2002 film) =

- VCD cover
- Directed by: Singeetham Srinivasa Rao
- Written by: Singeetham Srinivasa Rao
- Dialogue by: Nanjunda
- Story by: Gururaj
- Produced by: Parimala Jaggesh; Jaggesh
- Starring: Jaggesh; Laila Patel
- Cinematography: Srinivas Rap
- Edited by: S. Manohar
- Music by: John
- Production company: Jaggesh Chitra
- Release date: 8 November 2002
- Country: India
- Language: Kannada

Makeup is a 2002 Indian Kannada-language comedy film directed by Singeetham Srinivasa Rao, starring Jaggesh and Laila Patel. It was released on 8 November 2002. The film is based on 2000 American film Big Momma's House.

== Plot ==
To gather important information about a case, Jaggesh, a police officer, disguises himself as an old woman. During his investigation, he falls in love with a woman.

== Cast ==
- Jaggesh as K. D. Roy / Doddamma
- Laila Patel as Pooja
- Bank Janardhan as a police commissioner
- Mimicry Dayanand as Bobby
- Tennis Krishna as Saridon
- Komal as a karate master
- Pavitra Lokesh as Kamakshi
- Shakti Kapoor
- Yathiraj Jaggesh
- Master Raghavendra
- Jayaram

== Production ==
The make up for Jaggesh's grandmother getup in the film took four hours to apply. Newcomer Laila Patel from Mumbai was cast as the heroine. The film was produced by Jaggesh and his wife, Parimala, and was written by his son Gururaj. Shakti Kapoor, in his Kannada debut, and Jaggesh's son, Yathiraj, play supporting roles.

== Soundtrack ==
Debutante John composed the music.

Track listing
No.	Title	Singer(s)	Length
1.	"Baa Raja Byandu"	Malgudi Subha	3:52
2.	"Dimple Dimple"	Nanditha, Rajesh Krishnan	3:40
3.	"Chooste Sumar"	Manu	3:44
4.	"Jaka Jaka Janaka"	Nanditha, Rajesh Krishnan	4:22
5.	"Bhol Bhol"	Rajesh Krishnan	4:18
Total length:			19:56

== Release and reception ==
A critic from Chitraloka.com gave a favourable review and opined that "Director Singeetham Srinivasarao has shown his diligence and proves that comedy is his hot favorite" and stated that "Jaggesh's effort and his dialogue delivery is a treat to watch". A critic from Viggy opined that "Jaggesh as Doddamma has done an excellent job" and called the film "A sheer pleasure for Jaggesh fans". Srikanth of Deccan Herald noted that the film was inspired from characters in Mrs. Doubtfire (1993) and Avvai Shanmugi (1996), "but with a Jaggesh punch." However, he felt that "Jaggesh has nothing new to offer to his fans except for his new makeup and 'get-up'. However, there are more laughs in the film that he is known to give the audience and his fans. Laila Patel has nothing much to do. Shakti Kapoor disappoints and so is Tennis Krishna".

== Box office ==
Despite the positive reviews and a strong run at the box office, the film was a box office failure and lost ₹75 lakh (equivalent to ₹3.1 crore or US$330,000 in 2026) due to the high budget. Jaggesh had to sell his house to compensate for the loss. He cites the reason for the film's failure is that the film released at the "wrong time". Despite the film's failure, Jaggesh garnered appreciation for his role.
