= Wafa: A Deadly Love Story =

Wafaa: A Deadly Love Story
- Poster
- Directed by: Rakesh Sawant
- Written by: Salim Raza
- Produced by: Shambhu Pandey
- Starring: Sahib Chopra; Rajesh Khanna; Laila Khan
- Music by: Ravi Pawar; Sayed Ahmed
- Distributed by: Dimension Pictures
- Release date: 19 December 2008
- Country: India
- Language: Hindi

Wafaa: A Deadly Love Story is a 2008 Indian Hindi-language film starring Rajesh Khanna, Laila Khan, and Sahib Chopra. It was written by Salim Raza and directed by Rakesh Sawant and released on 19 December 2008 worldwide by Dimension Pictures. Wafaa was promoted as a comeback film for Rajesh Khanna in the lead role.

== Plot ==
Amritlal marries Beena. After the marriage Beena is not satisfied with him and has a secret affair with Raj (who plays the chauffeur). She then arranges Amritlal's accidental death, notifies the police, and identifies his body. But a man who resembles Amritlal and claims to be him appears.

== Cast ==
- Rajesh Khanna as Amritlal Chopra
- Rajesh Balmiki -
- Tomojit Kumar -
- Laila Khan as Beena
- Saahib
- Tinu Anand
- Sudesh Berry as police officer

== Music ==
Playback singers include Mika Singh, Udit Narayan and Kumar Sanu. The music was composed by Ravi Pawar and Sayed Ahmed, and the lyrics were written by Sahb Ilhabadi.

	Song	Singer(s)
1.	"Wafaa"	Kalpana
2.	"Tere Begeir"	Kumar Sanu and Pronali
3.	"Muztarib"	Akriti Kakkar and Mika Singh
4.	"Bhula Sako To"	Udit Narayan
5.	"Tu Hai Shola"	Kailash Kher
6.	"Husn Hai"	Aftab Hashim Sabri
7.	"Raste Roshan Hue"	Sunidhi Chauhan and Rahul Vaidya
8.	"Sargarmiyan"	Jaya Piyush

== Reception ==
=== Critical response ===
Anand Singh from Hindustan Times wrote "If memory serves right, in his 'superstar' heyday, Rajesh Khanna did not take his shirt off, like today's studs routinely do". A reviewer from The Times of India wrote "It's left to a tired cop (Sudesh Berry) to unravel whatever mystery might remain in this completely predictable plot of a wafaadar (faithful) husband and a bewafaa wife".
