= Nagaraj Kote =

Indian Kannada actor

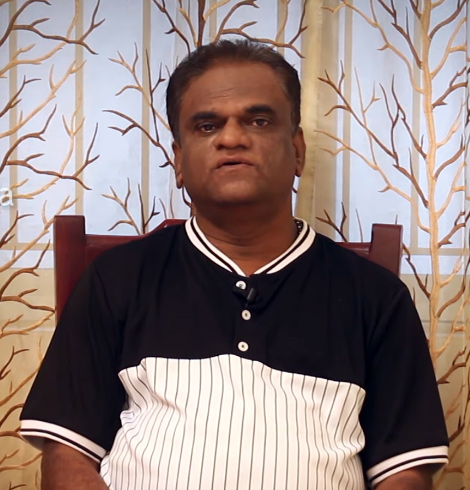
- Kote in 2019
- Born: 18 April 1965 (age 60); Channarayapatna, Hassan, Karnataka, India
- Occupation(s): Film actor, theatre artist
- Notable work: Baanaadi (2014 film)
- Website: nagarajkote.com

Nagaraj Kote is an Indian actor in the Kannada film industry, and a theatre artist in Karnataka, India. He worked in several TV serials/shows at the beginning of his career.

== Award(s) ==
Year	Award	Film	Credit	Category	Result	Ref(s).
2014	Karnataka State Film Awards	Baanaadi	Director	Best Children Film	Won	
2010	Rajyotsava Award	-	Contribution to cinema	-	Won	
2011	Kempegowda Award	-	Contribution to cinema	-	Won	

== Personal life ==
Kote was the eldest among four children. His father was Javarappa and mother Rangamma. He is married and has two sons.

== Career ==
Kote started his acting career in TV serial/soap Sankranti, directed by his mentor T. S. Nagabharana. Kote's theater play Nele, whose message was on importance of trees, entered Limca Book of Records. Kote has an acting career spanning 30 years in cinema.

== Selected filmography ==
- Baanaadi (2014) (Director, writer, screenplay)
- Jagath Kiladi (1998)
- Jayammana Maga (2013)
- Haalu Thuppa (2017)
