= Baanaadi =

2014 Indian Kannada film

- Film poster
- Directed by: Nagaraj Kote
- Written by: Nagaraj Kote
- Screenplay by: Nagaraj Kote
- Based on: Usiru by Nagaraj Kote
- Produced by: Dhruti M. Nagaraju
- Starring: Praful Vishwakarma; H. G. Dattatreya; Rajesh Nataranga
- Cinematography: Sabha Kumar
- Edited by: Mohan Kamakshi
- Music by: Karthik Sharma
- Production company: Dhruti Cinema
- Release date: 5 December 2014
- Running time: 146 minutes
- Country: India
- Language: Kannada

Baanaadi (Kannada: ಬಾನಾಡಿ) is a 2014 Indian Kannada language children's film written and directed by debutant Nagaraj Kote, based on the novel Usiru he wrote. It stars Praful Vishwakarma, H. G. Dattatreya and Rajesh Nataranga in the lead roles. The supporting cast features Dhruthi, Abhinaya, Sringeri Ramanna, Jayashree Raj, Venkatachala, T. S. Nagabharana, Mimicry Gopi and Yashwanth Kote. Music for five of the six soundtracks in the film were composed by Karthik Sharma, who, with the film became the youngest composer in the history of Kannada cinema.

== Cast ==
- Master Praful Vishwakarma as Kishore
- H. G. Dattatreya as Kishore's Grandfather
- Rajesh Nataranga as Avinash
- Kumari Dhruthi as Pallavi
- Abhinaya as Kusuma
- Sringeri Ramanna as Thathayya
- Jayashree Raj as Girija
- Venkatachala as Muthyappa
- T. S. Nagabharana as Ashwath Kumar
- Mimicry Gopi as Duduma
- Yashawantha Kote as Hanumya
- Master Madhusudan
- Bank Janardhan
- Ramesh Pandith
- Mugu Suresh
- Baraguru Ramachandrappa
- Manasi Sudheer
- Mohan Juneja
- Nagraj Kote as Ranga

== Production ==
Usiru, a novel written by Nagaraj Kote in the 1990s, deals with the upbringing of children in the current era. Deciding to direct a film based on the novel, Kote launched the film in April 2014, having signed Praful Vishwakarma, Rajesh Nataranga and H. G. Dattatreya to play characters of three generations; a young boy, his father and grandfather.

== Soundtrack ==
Baanaadi

Soundtrack album by Karthik Sharma
- Released: 26 July 2014
- Recorded: 2014
- Genre: Feature film soundtrack
- Label: Lahari Music

Karthik Sharma composed the background score for the film and music for five soundtracks in the film. The lyrics were written by Nagaraj Kote and M. N. Vyasa Rao. The track "Henda Hendthi" was taken from one of G. P. Rajarathnam's works, to which the music was composed by Raju Ananthaswamy. Another track "Yaaru Baruvaru" was taken from the works of Purandara Dasa, a Carnatic music composer who lived in the 16th century. The album consists of six soundtracks. It was released on 26 July 2014, in Bangalore.

Track list
No.	Title	Lyrics	Music	Singer(s)	Length
1.	"Banadi Banadi"	Nagaraj Kote	Karthik Sharma	Chorus
2.	"Comingo Comingo"	Nagaraj Kote	Karthik Sharma	Chorus
3.	"Bhoomi Ninna Thaayi"	M. N. Vyasa Rao	Karthik Sharma	Chithra
4.	"Henda Hendthi"	G. P. Rajarathnam	Raju Ananthaswamy	Raju Ananthaswamy
5.	"Ellinda Bandyappa"	M. N. Vyasa Rao	Karthik Sharma	Venkatachala
6.	"Yaaru Baruvaru"	Purandara Dasa	Karthik Sharma	Ravindra Soragavi

== Critical reception ==
Upon theatrical release, the film received positive reviews from critics. B. S. Srivani of Deccan Herald felt that the film was successful in "conveying the message quite effectively". She concluded writing praises of the acting performances and the music in the film. G. S. Kumar of The Times of India reviewed the film and wrote, "Director Nagaraja Kote has chosen a topic with a social message and made best use of Hagalu Vesha. Their performance blends well with the story." He concluded giving special mention to the Dattatreya's performance and the film's cinematography.
