= Mass Leader =

2017 Indian Kannada film written and directed by Narasimha

- Film poster
- Directed by: Narasimha
- Written by: Narasimha
- Produced by: Tarun Shivappa; Hardik Gowda
- Starring: Shiva Rajkumar; Pranitha Subhash; Vijay Raghavendra; Gururaj Jaggesh; Yogesh; Sharmiela Mandre; Vamsi Krishna
- Cinematography: Guru Prashant Rai
- Edited by: K. M. Prakash
- Music by: Veer Samarth
- Production company: Tarun Talkies
- Release date: 11 August 2017
- Country: India
- Language: Kannada

Mass Leader is a 2017 Indian Kannada-language action thriller film written and directed by Narasimha, and produced jointly by Tarun Shivappa and Hardik Gowda. It features Shiva Rajkumar, Pranitha Subhash and Vamsi Krishna in the lead roles whilst Vijay Raghavendra, Yogesh, Gururaj Jaggesh, Sharmiela Mandre, Ashika Ranganath and Parinitha Kitty in key supporting roles. The soundtrack and score for the film is composed by Veer Samarth and the cinematography is by Guru Prashant Rai.

== Plot ==
Bangladeshi infiltrators are thriving in Karnataka and other countries around India with the help of the politicians, who practice vote-bank politics. CM Sudarshan's brother Suyodhana takes the help of a terrorist named Rafiq to bring Bangladeshi infiltrators to cast their vote, in order to become MP, but is stopped by Shivraj and his associates Vijay aka Viji and Guru. They kill Suyodhana, earning the wrath of Sudarshan and also take actions against the crime syndicates and other illegal activities.

Azim, a Mangalore contract killer is tasked by Rafiq to kill Shivraj, but is double-crossed by his men and reunites with his mother, who is living with Shivaraj as his daughter Chummi's caretaker. With the help of a reporter Chandini, They successfully drives out the infiltrators by using widespread rumours that they are going to be attacked. Under orders from Pakistani terrorists, Rafiq plant a bomb at Chummi's surgical leg to kill Shivaraj, but Azim and his mother get killed in the blast. In a flashback, Shivraj was an INA Captain in Kashmir with a loving wife Deepa, parents and sister Shreya. Shreya is in relationship with Harshath, who is actually a terrorist and uses Shreya to spy on Shivaraj.

Shivaraj is assigned to escort Central Minister Virendra Hegde to Amarnath temple where his family is also escorted in Hegde's convoy, but the convoy is destroyed leaving Chummi handicapped. Shivaraj, with his team sneak into Harshath's hideout where they learn that their superior Pratap Sinha is the mole in the INA. A shootout ensues where Shivaraj and his team eliminate the terrorists, but Harshath escapes. In the present, Shivaraj, Viji and Guru are actually working incognito for the Indian Army where they track down Harshath and manages to kill him and his men.

== Cast ==
- Shiva Rajkumar as INA Captain Shivraj
- Pranitha Subhash as Deepa
- Vijay Raghavendra as INA officer Vijay aka Viji
- Gururaj Jaggesh as INA officer Guru
- Yogesh as Azim
- Vamsi Krishna as Harshath
- Sharmiela Mandre as Chandini, a reporter
- Ashika Ranganath as Shreya
- Parinitha Kitty as Chummi
- Prakash Belawadi as Chief Minister Sudarshan
- Chi. Guru Dutt as Police Commissioner

== Production ==
The film was officially launched on 19 April 2016 in Bangalore. Apart from various locations in Karnataka and Andhra Pradesh, the principal photography took place in Kashmir amidst heavy snow fall. The crew shifted the shoot to Manali after tensions erupted in Kashmir in January 2017.

== Soundtrack ==
Mass Leader

Soundtrack album by Veer Samarth
- Released: 9 July 2017
- Recorded: 2017
- Genre: Feature film soundtrack
- Label: Lahari Music
- Producer: Veer Samarth

Veer Samarth was signed to compose the film's music, making his 25th film. The soundtrack was released on 9 July 2017, with the Telugu actor Nandamuri Balakrishna officially launching the audio.

All lyrics are written by V. Nagendra Prasad.

Track list
No.	Title	Singer(s)	Length
1.	"Mundhe Nintru"	Chetan Gandharva	4:46
2.	"Geleya Ennale"	Chetan Gandharva, Shreya Ghoshal	4:37
3.	"Aabida Aabida"	Veer Samarth, Supriya Lohith	4:04
4.	"Deepave Ninna"	Jubin Nautiyal, Aishwarya Rangarajan	2:53
5.	"Ee Mannali"	Prem, Chintan Vikas, Govind Kurnool	4:58
Total length:			21:18
