= Gilli (film) =

2009 Kannada-language drama film

- Directed by: Raghav Loki
- Written by: Selvaraghavan; Ram Narayan
- Based on: 7G Rainbow Colony by Selvaraghavan
- Produced by: Anaji Nagaraj; Jayanna; Vijay Kiran
- Starring: Gururaj; Rakul Preet Singh
- Cinematography: Krishna
- Edited by: Sanat
- Music by: Yuvan Shankar Raja
- Production company: JNVK Films
- Distributed by: JNVK Films
- Release date: 16 October 2009
- Country: India
- Language: Kannada

Gilli is a 2009 Indian Kannada-language romantic drama film directed by Raghav Loki. A remake of Selvaraghavan's 2004 Tamil-Telugu bilingual film 7G Rainbow Colony, the film stars newcomers Gururaj and Rakul Preet Singh. The film, with music scored by Yuvan Shankar Raja and cinematography handled by Mungaru Male fame Krishna, was launched in February 2009 and released on 16 October 2009, coinciding with Diwali.

== Plot ==
The film begins with Guru aka Gilli on his way to work. People stare at him and laugh behind his back as he travels to his office. He appears distracted throughout the day and even instructs his assistant to postpone an important meeting with a big client. He then waits for someone at Marina Beach with a bouquet of flowers. His best friend, Shetty sees him and asks him who he is waiting for. Gilli explains he is waiting to meet his girlfriend, Anitha for their date. In flashbacks, the audience is shown how Gilli first met Anitha.

Gilli belongs to a lower middle class family, living with his parents and younger sister. He is perceived as a good-for-nothing person as he skips classes and gets involved in fights. Gilli believes that his father hates him and often quarrels with him, even threatening to leave the house, only to be persuaded not to do so by his mother. Gilli's life changes when a once well-to-do family moves into the same colony due to loss in business. Gilli is attracted to the daughter of his new neighbour, Anitha. Although he tries to woo her, Anitha treats him with disdain. One day, Gilli confesses to Anitha that he loves her. He tells her that having always been ridiculed, he found respite in the fact that she at least bothered to look at him. He promises to wipe her thoughts out of his mind, as he is not right for her.

Despite himself, Gilli continues pursuing her. Anitha realizes that Gilli is not such a useless fellow when Shetty tells her that she has seen Gilli dismantle and assemble a motorcycle within minutes each time they steal a bike to get drunk. Anitha takes Gilli to a Yamaha dealer and asks them to give him a job. He is promised a job if he can assemble a bike. Initially, the lethargic Gilli is uninterested and gives up the task. Anitha takes him to the washroom and slaps him before revealing that she has fallen in love with him. She then tells him that they can only be together if he gets a proper job and gets his life straightened out. Gilli then demonstrates his skill in motorcycle assembly, securing a good job with the dealer.

Later that evening, Gilli plans a treat for his friends. However, Anitha confronts him and makes him break the good news to his parents first to get their blessings. However, Gilli's father berates him as usual for getting a job instead of completing college. Then later at night, Gilli overhears his father telling his mother how proud he is of their son since getting a job at such a prestigious company, which is not easy. The only reason the father did not openly praise Gilli is because he feared his son might misjudge him for giving him respect, only now that he is earning money for their household. Only then does Gilli realize his father's love for him and weeps in joy. The intimacy between Gilli and Anitha is discovered by her mother and she refuses to allow them to continue dating even as Gilli's father tries to persuade her otherwise. Anitha's family is heavily indebted to another Northern Indian family that has been supporting them since Anitha's father suffered losses in his business. Anitha's parents want Anitha to marry the son of the family that has helped them.

Using her friend's marriage as a ruse and with the unwitting help of her friend's aunt, Anitha escapes her home and travels with Gilli to a tourist place and they end up in a hotel room. Anitha reveals that she has made the biggest decision of her life by deciding to make love to him, as he should not regret falling in love with her when she marries the man her parents chose. Gilli becomes angry and states that he had always wanted to marry her and have sex with her after marriage, as he loved her in that regard. They have an argument, but eventually compromise and stay up talking to each other joyfully throughout the night, and decide to get married the next day. The next day, as Gilli and Anitha are walking to the temple, Anitha gets second thoughts about the marriage, angering Gilli, who tells her that they should part ways. Anitha leaves to cross the street while Gilli stays. While crossing the road, Anitha is knocked down by a truck as a helpless Gilli watches. Gilli runs after her and is also hit by a speeding vehicle. Anitha dies gruesomely on the spot and Gilli is injured. Gilli is heavily shocked to find the mere remains of Anitha in the Hospital mortuary. The police try to investigate Gilli, especially since Anitha's family wants to put a murder case on him, but Gilli tells the Police that Anitha had never accepted his love, and her death was really an accident. This way, Gilli saves Anitha's dignity and her mother forgives him as she leaves. After sadly returning, Gilli tries to commit suicide only to be helped by a group of nuns. Gilli then hallucinates about Anitha's spirit coming to him and advising him to live life to the fullest. Back in the present day, it is revealed that Gilli has become a very successful person in his life, but has remained mentally damaged since Anitha's death. He still believes that she is alive and always imagines talking to her. The film ends with Gilli talking to himself at the beach, thinking that he is talking to Anitha.

== Cast ==
- Gururaj as Guru (Gilli)
- Rakul Preet Singh as Anitha
- Srinivasa Murthy as Guru's father
- Sudha Belawadi as Guru's mother
- Yathiraj Jaggesh as Shetty, Guru's friend
- Veena Venkatesh
- Siddaraj Kalyankar
- Umashree as Anitha's friend's aunt (uncredited)

== Soundtrack ==
Gilli

Soundtrack album by Yuvan Shankar Raja
- Released: 8 June 2009
- Recorded: 2009
- Genre: Feature film soundtrack
- Length: 32:23
- Label: Anand Audio
- Producer: Yuvan Shankar Raja

Yuvan Shankar Raja chronology
Oy! (2009)	Gilli (2009)	Yogi (2009)

The music is scored by Yuvan Shankar Raja, who had composed the music for the original version as well. The soundtrack was released on 8 June 2009 and features 7 tracks, which are retained from the original version. However, the song "January Madham" was not featured in the soundtrack and the "Theme music" was not the same as in the Tamil soundtrack. The lyrics were written by Ram Narayan and Shyam.

No.	Title	Lyrics	Performer(s)	Length
1.	"Vayasu Bandide"	Shyam	Haricharan, Shalini Singh	5:41
2.	"Kannina Bhashe"	Ram Narayan	Karthik	6:30
3.	"Kanasu Kaano Kaalagalu"	Ram Narayan	Harish Raghavendra, Madhumitha, Ustad Sultan Khan	6:11
4.	"Nenedu Nenedu Nodu" (Female version)	Ram Narayan	Shreya Ghoshal	4:36
5.	"Idu Ranarangava"	Ram Narayan	Harish Raghavendra	3:09
6.	"Nenedu Nenedu Nodu" (Male version)	Ram Narayan	Rajesh Krishnan	6:00
7.	"Theme Music"	-	Instrumental	1:16
Total length:				32:23

== Reception ==
=== Critical response ===
R. G. Vijayasarathy of Rediff.com scored the film at 2.5 out of 5 stars and says "Gururaj shows promise in his first film and fits in the role. Rakul Preethi Singh looks static in many important sequences and has the same expressions. Gururaj's younger brother Yethiraj is impressive, though. But it is Sreenivasa Murthy who scores well in the father's role. Yuvan Shankar Raja's entire music composition has been lifted from the original. S.Krishna's camera work is top class". A critic from Bangalore Mirror wrote "Gururaj makes a decent debut. But it has to be seen if he can manage the versatility of roles that actors are expected to. With a story like this for debut, there is clear and present danger that he may be confined to such roles. The second half of the film seems a little preachy with long monologues and a tediously protracted climax. The film also seems to suffer from lack of preparation. It is still worth a watch". A critic from Sify.com wrote "Gururaj is apt for the role and he excels in most of the scenes while Rakul Preeth Singh looks very beautiful. Veteran Srinivasamurthy as a caring father scores over all. Yuvan Shanker Raja original songs are good. S Krishna camera work supports the mood of the film".

== See also ==
- 7G Rainbow Colony
