= Shwetha Chengappa =

Indian actress

Swetha Changappa
- Born: Garvale, Somwarpet, Kodagu, Karnataka, India
- Occupation: Actress
- Years active: 2003–present
- Television: Kadambari, Arundati, Jodi No.1, Super Queen, Chota Champion

Swetha Changappa is a Kannada television actress who has acted in various tele-serials and films. In 2014 she participated in Bigg Boss Kannada 2 and finished as 3rd Runner-up of the show. She is well known for her role "Rani" in Majaa Talkies, and TV serial Kadambari.Now

== Career ==
She debuted her acting career through Sumathi, a serial directed by S. Narayan, aired on Udaya TV during 2003–2005. Her fame was her among the television audience of Karnataka reached heights through her role in Kannada soap Kadambari which was produced by Balaji Telefilms and aired on Udaya TV in 2006. She acted in lead roles for Sukanya and Arundhathi that were aired on ETV Kannada (now Colors Kannada )which eventually became bigger hits in 2008 and 2010 respectively. She also hosted TV show Yaariguntu Yaarigilla on Zee Kannada which was themed on celebration of spirit of womanhood. She also hosted Kuniyonu Baara on Zee Kannada, which was a dance show for children. She also hosted Dance Dance Juniors on Star Suvarna which was a dance show for children. Shwetha has also acted in Kannada movies, Thangigagi with Darshan Thoogudeep and Varsha with Vishnuvardhan. Shwetha was a contestant of Bigg Boss Kannada Season 2, which was hosted by Kiccha Sudeep when she emerged in fourth-place. She participated in Super Minute aired on ETV Kannada hosted by Ganesh in the grand finale episode along with Nikita Thukral, Deepika Kamaiah, Neethu, Anushree, Kayva, Anumapa and Narendra Babu Sharma. She is currently acting as Rani in the Kannada sketch comedy show Majaa Talkies with Srujan Lokesh.

== Filmography ==
=== Films ===
| Year | Film | Role | Notes |
|---|---|---|---|
| 2005 | Varsha | Gayatri | |
| 2006 | Thangigagi | Gowri | |
| 2022 | Vedha | Paari | |

=== Television ===
| Year | Title | Role | Channel | Notes |
|---|---|---|---|---|
| 2003 | Sumathi | Sumathi | Udaya TV | |
| 2004 | Kadambari | Kadambari | Udaya TV | |
| 2008 | Sukanya | Sukanya | ETV Kannada | |
| 2010 | Arundhathi | Arundhathi | ETV Kannada | |
| 2011 | Saundarya | Saundarya | DD Chandana | |
| 2012 | Yariguntu Yarigilla | Host | Zee Kannada | |
| 2013 | Kuniyonu Bara | Host | Zee Kannada | |
| 2014 | Bigg Boss Season 2 | Contestant | Star Suvarna | |
| 2015 | Super Minute | Contestant | ETV Kannada | |
| 2015 | Majaa Talkies | Raani | Colors Kannada | |
| 2016 | Dancing Star | Herself | Colors Kannada | |
| 2017 | Dance Dance Juniors | Host | Star Suvarna | |
| 2022 | Jodi No.1 (Season 1) | Host | Zee Kannada | |
| 2022-2023 | Super Queen | Host | Zee Kannada | Hosted along with Kuri Prathap |
| 2023–present | Chhota Champion | Host | Zee Kannada | Hosted along with Kuri Prathap |
| 2023–present | Jodi No.1 (Season 2) | Host | Zee Kannada | Hosted along with Kuri Prathap |
