= Vishnu Circle =

2019 Indian Kannada-language film

- Directed by: Lakshmi Dinesh
- Screenplay by: Puttanna Kanagal
- Based on: Avadhana by Dodderi Venkatagiri Rao
- Produced by: B Hanumantha Raju
- Starring: Gururaj; Samhita Vinya; Janvi Jyothi; Divya Gowda; Aruna Balraj
- Cinematography: P. L. Ravee
- Edited by: Satish Chandraiah
- Music by: Shree Vathsa
- Release date: 6 September 2019
- Running time: 101 minutes
- Country: India
- Language: Kannada

Vishnu Circle is a 2019 Indian Kannada-language romantic drama film directed by Lakshmi Dinesh and produced by RB. The movie cast includes Gururaj, Samhita Vinya, Janvi Jyothi and Divya Gowda are in the lead roles.

== Cast ==
- Gururaj as Vishnu
- Samhita Vinya as Aakruthi
- Janvi Jyothi as Samskurthi
- Divya Gowda
- Aruna Balraj as Pramila
- Hanumanthe Gowda as Rajanna
- Dattanna

== Reception ==
=== Critical response ===
A Sharadhaa from The New Indian Express wrote "While a few of them have done justice, there are some who use them only to their advantage. As far as Vishnu Circle is concerned, it would be better for cinema-goers to watch a genuine Vishnuvardhan film instead". A reviewer of Vijaya Karnataka says "Even when I saw the movie 'Vishnu Circle', such a question arose. Apart from the fact that the hero of the story is a fan of Dr. Vishnu and the story unfolds in Vishnu's circle, the rest of the circle is a shambles". Kesava Murthy from Asianet News wrote "You can be the beneficiary of 'Vishnu Circle' only if you don't expect anything from the cinematography, appropriate composition of scenes, thought-provoking dialogues. The liveliness in Duttanna's love episode. PL Ravi's cinematography is the highlight of the film".
