= Haalu Thuppa =

2017 Indian Kannada-language film

- Directed by: Shashank Raj
- Screenplay by: Shashank Raj
- Produced by: Dodmane Venkatesh
- Starring: Gadappa; Samhita Vinya; Century Gowda; Singri Gowda; Honnavalli Krishna; Nagaraj Kote
- Release date: 3 November 2017
- Running time: 128 minutes
- Country: India
- Language: Kannada

Haalu Thuppa is a 2017 Indian Kannada-language romantic drama film directed by Shashank Raj and produced by Dodmane Venkatesh. The movie cast includes Gadappa, Samhita Vinya, Century Gowda, Honnavalli Krishna and Nagaraj Kote are in the lead roles.

== Cast ==
- Gadappa
- Samhita Vinya
- Century Gowda
- Singri Gowda
- Honnavalli Krishna
- Nagaraj Kote
