= Sudha Baragur =

Indian humorist and stand-up comedian

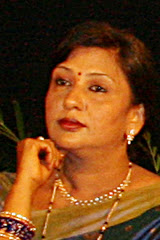
- Occupations: Humorist, stand-up comedian, lecturer
- Website: sudhabaragur.com

Sudha Baragur is an Indian humorist and stand-up comedian based in Bengaluru, Karnataka.

== Career and early life ==
She holds a master's degree in economics. She had won more than 1000 prizes as a debater, until her university studies. She is an eloquent orator.

Sudha Baragur felicitated K.N. Janardhana, during Nandini Utsav (2015), held in Bengaluru, Karnataka. She was the chief guest of ′District Lioness meet′ held on 16 January 2010. She has conducted more than 2500 humor shows like ′Hasyotsava′, ′Nage Habba′, ′Nage Sambrama′, ′Nage Suggi′ etc.

She was part TV shows like Majaa Talkies (Episode 120), Udaya TV's ′Harate′ etc.

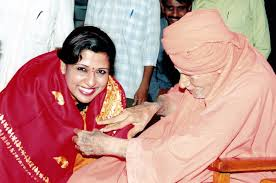
Sudha Baragur (left), Shivakumara Swami (right), during a felicitation program in Tumkur
