= Lucky (2012 Telugu film) =

2012 Telugu film directed by Hari

- Poster
- Directed by: Hari
- Written by: Hari
- Produced by: Raja Rajeswari
- Starring: Srikanth; Meghana Raj
- Cinematography: Srinivas Reddy
- Edited by: Nagi Reddy
- Music by: Sai Karthik
- Production company: Raja Rajeswari Pictures
- Release date: 1 November 2012
- Country: India
- Language: Telugu

Lucky is a 2012 Indian Telugu-language romantic comedy film written and directed by Hari. The film stars Srikanth and Meghana Raj in the lead. It is a remake of the Marathi movie Aga Bai Arrecha! (2004), which itself is loosely based on the American film What Women Want (2000). Sai Karthik provided the music. The movie was released on 1 November 2012.

== Cast ==
- Srikanth as Lakshmi Narasimha "Lucky"
- Meghana Raj as Janaki
- Jayasudha
- Roja as Lucky's boss
- Brahmanandam
- Ali
- Raghu Babu
- Dharmavarapu Subramanyam as Lawyer Kishan Kumar
- A. V. S. as Lucky's father
- Sana as Lucky's mother
- Thagubothu Ramesh as Lucky's friend
- Dhanraj as Lucky's friend
- Saikumar Pampana
- Venu Yeldandi as Lucky's friend
- Geetha Singh as Taxi driver
- Sudeepa Pinky
- Chalapathi Rao as Tirupati Reddy

== Soundtrack ==
Lucky

Soundtrack album to Lucky by Sai Karthik
- Released: 2 October 2012
- Recorded: 2012
- Genre: Feature film soundtrack
- Length: 17:44
- Language: Hindi
- Label: Aditya Music
- Producer: Sai Karthik

Sai Karthik chronology
Dhan Dhana Dhan (2011)	Lucky (2012)	Om 3D (2013)

The music was composed by Sai Karthik.

Tracklist
No.	Title	Lyrics	Artist(s)	Length
1.	"Ori Shankara"	Bhaskarabhatla	Srikanth	03:16
2.	"Nee Mounam"	Balaji	Karthik	03:30
3.	"Ammavari Theme"	Theme Music	Bindu, Sudha	02:08
4.	"Sariga Choosthey"	Bhaskarabhatla	Karthik	04:08
5.	"Oogay Oogay Lokalu"	Bhaskarabhatla	Hemachandra, Divija Karthik	04:03
6.	"Theme of Lucky"	Theme Music	Dinakar, Sai Charan	00:39
Total length:				17:44

== Reception ==
A critic from IANS wrote: "Lucky, which is loosely based on US romantic comedy What Women Want, is a disappointing affair - not worth either your time and money. Neither is the film as humorously quirky as the original, nor has any elements that can engage throughout its running time".
