= Madirasi =

- Directed by: Shaji Kailas
- Written by: Rajesh Jayaraman
- Produced by: Jagadeesh Chandran, Impresario
- Starring: Jayaram; Kalabhavan Mani; Meera Nandan; Meghana Raj
- Cinematography: Shaji Kumar
- Edited by: Don Max
- Music by: Satish Sujit
- Production companies: Kichu Films, Impresario Motion Pictures
- Distributed by: Kichu Films, KNM Films Release
- Release date: 7 December 2012
- Country: India
- Language: Malayalam

Madirasi is a 2012 Indian Malayalam action comedy film directed by Shaji Kailas, starring Jayaram, Meera Nandan, Kalabhavan Mani, Meghana Raj, Tini Tom, John Vijay, and Kailash. The film is based on a series of true incidents that took place in the city of Madras, known in Malayalam as "Madirasi". Madirasi is, however, described as a part of Coimbatore in the film.

== Plot ==
The film tells the story of Chandran Pillai, a widower from a village in Kerala. Bhama, a teacher, wants to marry Chandran Pillai and be a mother to his son, whom she likes a lot. The story begins with a Delhi-based young journalist named Jayakrishnan getting kidnapped. In the meantime, Chandran Pillai travels to Madirasi, to buy his son a bicycle. He is drawn into a vicious circle when he goes probing the disappearance of Johny, a police constable.

== Cast ==
- Jayaram as Chandran Pillai
- Kalabhavan Mani as Constable Johny
- John Vijay as SP Devaram IPS
- Tini Tom as Jayapalan
- Meera Nandan as Bhama
- Meghana Raj as Maya
- Kailash as Jayakrishnan
- Kochu Preman as Nambeeshan
- Aishwarya as Ragini, Devaram's wife
- Alphonsa as Mallika
- Janardhanan as Kurup
- Sreelatha Namboothiri as Lakshmi, Chandran's mother
- Sunil Sukhada as Stephen Tharakan, Church Father
- Sasi Kalinga as Olimpian
- Bheeman Raghu as Achenkeeri
- Santhosh as Udumpi Mani
- Manju Sajish

== Production ==
After 21 years, Jayaram and Shaji Kailas finally collaborated on a movie. The last time they were seen together was for Kilukkampetty released in 1991. "Jayaram and I have been discussing to do a movie for four to five years. When I did the script for Madirasi, I thought Jayaram was the apt person to essay the role," says Shaji.

== Release ==
The film, initially planned to be released in October, was announced for a 23 November release. It was again postponed to 7 December due to theater strike.

=== Critical response ===
The film was panned by critics. Unni R Nair, in his review for Kerala9.com, rated the film and said, "Shaji Kailas seems to have lost his touch. His last film, Simhasanam, was a let down. Now his latest, Madirashi, seems to re-iterate this fact. The film is a mess and disappoints you beyond all limits." Veeyen of Nowrunning.com gave a rating and said, "I had always felt that Shaji Kailas needed to rediscover himself. But now, after Madirasi, I have serious doubts about the reinvention idea." Theaterbalcony.com gave a 49% rating and said, "There is nothing which will amuse us in Madirasi, be it some genuine laugh, story, or performances."

== Soundtrack ==
Madirasi

Soundtrack album by Satish Sujith
- Released: 2012
- Genre: Feature film soundtrack
- Producers: Jagadeesh Chandran & Impresario Motion Pictures

Satish Sujith chronology
Ashtagandham (2012)	Madirasi (2012)

The film has one song composed by the composer duo Satish Sujith. The lyrics are by Mohan Udhinoor.

Track listing
No.	Title	Artist(s)	Length
1.	"Maaripoonkuyile"	Manjari	4:15
