= IPC Section 300 =

2009 Kannada-language film

IPC Section 300 (ಐ.ಪಿ.ಸಿ.ಸೆಕ್ಷನ್ ೩೦೦)
- Directed by: Shashikanth
- Produced by: Sri Suresh Gowda
- Starring: Devaraj; Vijay Raghavendra; Priyanka; Suman Ranganath; Srujan Lokesh
- Cinematography: A R Niranjan Babu
- Edited by: K Eshwar
- Music by: Veer Samarth
- Release date: 23 October 2009
- Country: India
- Language: Kannada

IPC Section 300 (Kannada: ಐ.ಪಿ.ಸಿ.ಸೆಕ್ಷನ್ ೩೦೦) is a 2009 Indian Kannada-language film directed by Shashikanth, starring Devaraj, Vijay Raghavendra, Priyanka, Suman Ranganath and Srujan Lokesh in lead roles. The movie is based on the 2007 movie Fracture.

== Plot ==
Mallik, an architect, kills his wife Sheela after he learns of her affair with a police officer. Later, the same police officer is assigned the task to probe the case of Sheela's murder.

== Cast ==
- Devaraj as Mallikarjun a.k.a. Mallik
- Vijay Raghavendra as Vijay
- Priyanka
- Suman Ranganath as Sheela
- Srujan Lokesh as a police officer

== Music ==
IPC section 300

Soundtrack album by Veera Samarth
- Released: 2009
- Recorded: 2009
- Genre: Feature film soundtrack
- Length: 17:38
- Language: Kannada

Official audio
- IPC section 300 - Full Album on YouTube

Track listing
No.	Title	Singer(s)	Length
1.	"Lajjo"	Hemanth Kumar	4:50
2.	"Tangaali Yante Bande Nee"	Santhosh Venky, Akanksha Badami	4:27
3.	"Kempu Tutigalu"	Anuradha Bhat	4:15
4.	"Dil Idda Mele"	Sunitha	4:46
Total length:			17:38

== Reception ==
=== Critical response ===
The Times of India scored the film at 3 out of 5 stars and wrote "Devaraj gives an extraordinary performance. Vijaya Raghavendra is equally good. Suman Ranganath and Srujan are superb. Yatiraj shines. Camerawork by Niranjan Babu is good as is Veera Samarth's music". B. S. S. of Deccan Herald wrote "Yatiraj as Investigating Officer Vineet is efficient in a small role. Heroine Priyanka is prescribed a dose of comedies to treat the depression on her face. The climax is riveting as expected and indeed lifts the film. The film scores in avoiding the ‘necessity’ to bow to ‘commercial, audience tastes’". Bangalore Mirror says Vijay Raghavendra looks odd in some scenes due to his weight loss, but otherwise is a bundle of energy. Srujan and Yethiraj fill their roles with life. The background score is superb. If only better ‘commercial’ sense had prevailed, this film would have been a class apart". R G Vijayasarathy of Rediff.com scored the film at 3 out of 5 stars and says "The screenplay and dialogues by Shashikanth are very realistic. The film as a whole belongs to Shashikanth who has to be appreciated for the choice of the subject and for exercising total control over his narration". Sify wrote "Srujan Lokesh is apt. The background score of MN Krupakar is well measured. The cinematography by Niranjan Babu has used the lighting effectively".
