= Laila Khan =

Indian actress (1978–2011)

- Born: Reshma Patel; 1978; Mumbai, India
- Died: 30 January 2011 (aged 32–33); Mumbai, India
- Cause of death: Homicide
- Spouse: Munir Khan
- Parents: Nadir Shah Patel (father); Shelina Patel (mother)

Laila Khan (born Reshma Patel; 1978 – 30 January 2011) was a Bollywood actress, best known for her role opposite Rajesh Khanna in the 2008 movie Wafa: A Deadly Love Story. She was married to Munir Khan, a member of the banned Bangladeshi Harkat-ul-Jihad-al-Islami Bangladesh. Khan, along with some members of her family, was allegedly killed by her stepfather in 2011 in Maharashtra.

== Film career ==
Laila Khan made her film debut under the stage name of Laila Patel in the Kannada film Makeup (2002). A critic noted that she "has nothing much to do". In 2008, she starred in Wafa: A Deadly Love Story in which she was paired opposite Rajesh Khanna. The film released to negative reviews with one critic noting that "Wafa can be counted among the worst films of the year (maybe of all time)".

== Alleged role in terror activities ==
Laila Khan allegedly supplied the Lashkar-e-Taiba (LeT), a terrorist organisation planning an attack on the city of Mumbai.

== Disappearance ==
On the night of 30 January 2011, Khan, accompanied by her mother Shelina, older sister Hashmina, twin siblings Imran and Zara, and cousin Rehshma, drove out of Mumbai towards their holiday home in Igatpuri, 126 km north of Mumbai. On 9 February 2011, Khans's mother spoke with her sister, Albana Patel, and said that she was in Chandigarh with her third husband Pervez Iqbal Tak. After this, the family vanished without a trace.

Subsequently, Khan's father, Nadir Shah Patel (Shelina's first husband), filed a complaint at a Mumbai police station stating that his daughter had gone missing along with other members of her family. A similar complaint was also filed by Bollywood film actress Rakhi Sawant, who was shooting a film with Khan just before she disappeared from Mumbai.

Nadir Shah Patel has appealed to the Bombay High Court on 17 July 2012 seeking transfer of his daughter's murder case from Crime Branch to NIA, alleging that the former did not probe the case promptly.

=== Police investigation and arrest of suspects ===
Khan's step-fathers, Parvez Iqbal Tak, a suspected Lashkar-e-Taiba member, and Asif Sheikh (Shelina's second husband), were suspected of being behind Khan and her family's disappearance. Police also questioned Nadir Shah Patel during the investigation.

Parvez Iqbal Tak was arrested by the Jammu and Kashmir Police in connection with another case on 21 June 2012. During interrogation Tak admitted that Khan and some members of her family were shot dead in Maharashtra in February 2011. The next day Tak retracted his story, claiming instead that Khan and her family were still alive. The Crime Branch of Mumbai Police investigating the kidnapping case brought Tak to Mumbai, where he was produced before Esplanade Court, South Mumbai, on 10 July 2012. The Court sent Tak to Police custody until 19 July.

Confessing before the Crime Branch, Tak changed his statement for a third time, claiming instead, that he intended to kill Khan's mother Shelina for continuously humiliating him, and for having relationship with other men. Tak told interrogators that he, along with his associates killed Khan and her five family members and buried their bodies behind her Igatpuri bungalow. He allegedly killed all of them as Khan had witnessed her mother's murder. Owing to Tak's continuously changing statements, the police were reluctant to place full reliance on his testimony.

Tak was taken to Igatpuri to corroborate the claims he made during his interrogation. Asif Sheikh was arrested from Bengaluru. Sheikh confessed that he and Tak shot and killed Khan and her family. Asif Sheikh's name was revealed as one of the co-conspirators by Parvez Tak in his earlier confession before the Jammu and Kashmir Police.

While examining Khan's Igatpuri bungalow, the Police investigation team found six buried bodies, believed to be those of Khan and her family members.

=== Aftermath ===
It is believed that money, jealousy, real estate, and possible shifting of the family to Dubai were the cause of the family murder. Investigation of Tak revealed that he intended to flee to Nepal where his Lashkar-e-Taiba (LeT) connections would have helped him to avoid arrest. He was, however, arrested by the J&K police in another case, before he could flee to Nepal.

The Police detained two persons – Jolly Guilder and Mehboob – whom Tak had hired to drive Khan's car from Igatpuri to Indore and onward to Delhi, and finally to Kishtwar where it was eventually recovered.

As part of their investigations, police are likely to open Khan's bank locker and scan three bank accounts of the family. In November 2012, based on a DNA test report crime branch officer claimed that the remains discovered at Khan's Igatpuri farmhouse belonged to her and her relatives.

Parvez Tak received the death sentence on 24 May 2024.

== See also ==
- Lists of solved missing person cases
