= Onti =

- Directed by: Shri
- Produced by: Arya
- Starring: Arya; Meghana Raj; Devaraj; Sharath Lohitashwa; Girija Lokesh
- Cinematography: K. Shashidhar
- Edited by: Kumar Kotekoppa
- Music by: Manoj S (Sri Lanka)
- Production company: Sai Ram Creations
- Release date: 5 July 2019
- Running time: 115 minutes
- Language: Kannada

Onti (transl. Alone) is a 2019 Indian Kannada language action film directed by Shri. The film starring Arya and Meghana Raj, is produced by Arya under banner Sai Ram Creations. The film has cinematography by K. Shashidhar.

== Cast ==
- Arya as Onti
- Meghana Raj as Paaru
- Devaraj
- Sharath Lohitashwa
- Girija Lokesh
- Ninasam Ashwath as Shankar
- Pawan Kumar as Kutty

== Release ==
The official trailer of the film was released by Anand Audio on 11 June 2019.

== Soundtrack ==
No.	Title	Singer(s)	Length
1.	"Onti Salaga"	Siddharth Basrur
2.	"Ondu Saari"	Sangeetha Ravindranath
3.	"Full Bottlu"	Vijay Prakash
4.	"Yaaru Illa"	Rajesh Krishnan

== Reviews ==
Vinay Lokesh of Times of India gave 2 stars out of 5 stating, "Onti is a run-of-the-mill commercial drama with ample doses of action, but the story is weak and doesn’t make an impact".
