= Anushree =

Anushree and Anusree are feminine given names of Indian origin. This name originally means Beautiful and Beautiful/pleasant morning. People with those names include:

- Anushree (Kannada actress) (born 1988), Kannada actress and television anchor
- Anusree (born 1988), Malayalam actress born Anusree Nair
- Anusree Roy (born 1982), Indo-Canadian playwright, actress and librettist
