= Mayuri Upadhya =

Indian choreographer, dancer (born 1979)

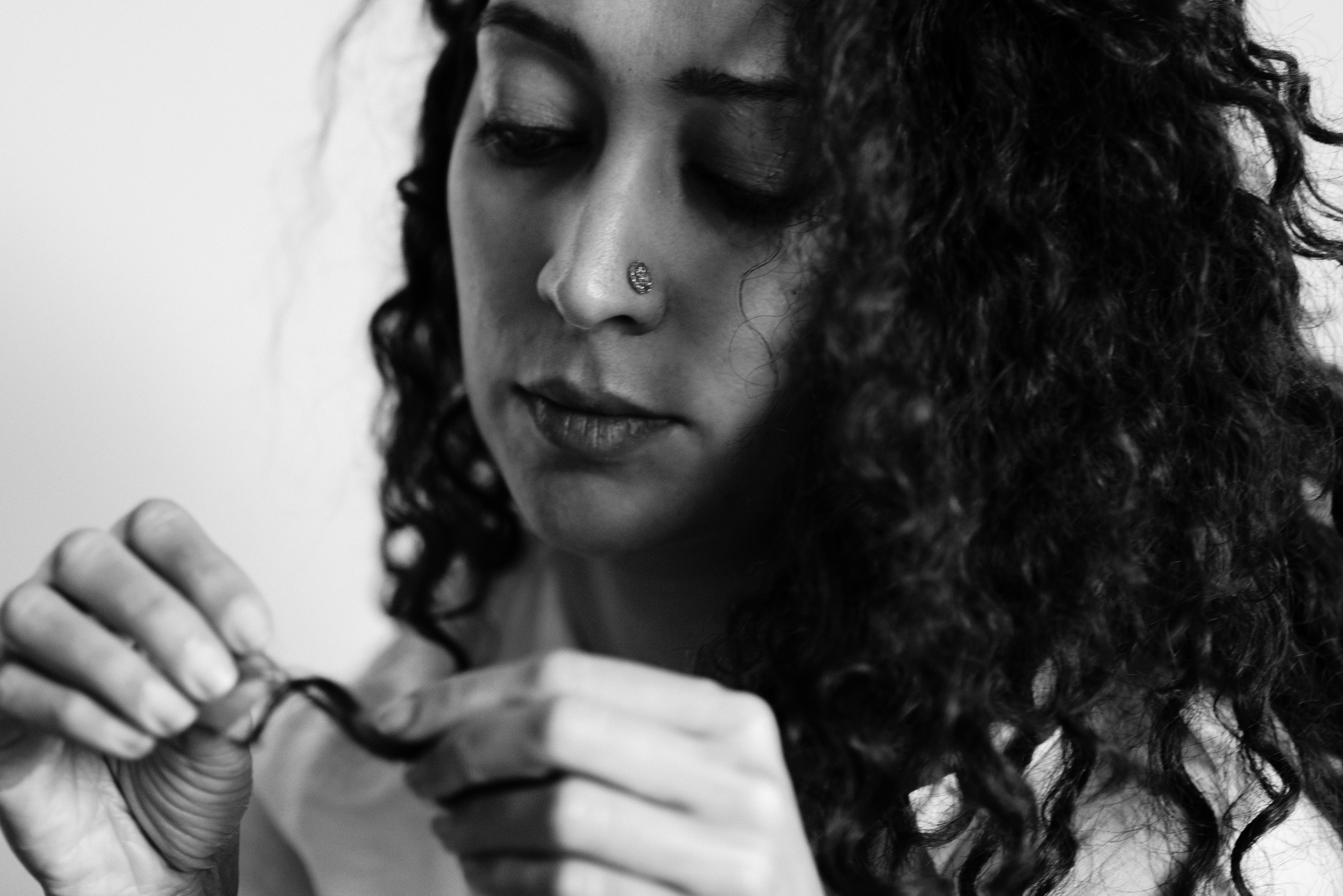
- Born: 30 December 1979 (age 46); Udupi, Karnataka, India
- Education: Contemporary dance, performing arts
- Occupations: Dancer, choreographer, entrepreneur, educationist
- Organization: Nritarutya
- Spouse: Raghu Dixit (m. 2005; div. 2019)
- Website: www.mayuriupadhya.com

Mayuri Upadhya (born 30 December 1979) is an Indian choreographer, dancer, entrepreneur, and TV personality based in Bengaluru, India. She is also the artistic director of the Bengaluru-based dance organisation, Nritarutya.

In January 2018, Mayuri was voted the Best Choreographer by BroadwayWorld, for the longest running musical in Indian history. Mayuri is the winner of the International Choreography Award, Seoul, Uday Shankar Awards for Choreography, and a Manav Ratna for her contribution to Indian arts and culture.

== Biography ==
=== Personal life ===
Mayuri was born in Udupi, Karnataka to Muralidhar Upadhya and Shamala Upadhya on 30 December 1979. She is the youngest of two siblings. Her elder sister Madhuri Upadhya is also a choreographer, and is the Associate Director of Nritarutya.

Mayuri is an alumnus of Sri Vani Education Centre and a graduate from MES College of Arts, Commerce & Science.

=== Training ===
She trained in Bharatanatyam under Indira Kadambi and Minal Prabhu, and Odissi under Uday Shetty. She has also trained in Kathak under Guru Maya Rao and Jayanthi Eswarputhi, and Kalaripayattu under Ranjan Mullaratt. She also has the Arts Council England’s Artist Management credentials.

=== Career ===
As a choreographer, she has created contemporary dance productions and contributed to films including Mirzya, as well as stage productions like Mughal-e-Azam, Raunaq and Jassi, and adaptations of Harviansh Rai Bachchan's Madhushala. She has also been involved in cultural initiatives by leading the Teaching for Arts India initiative at Sublime and curating the dance programme for Serendipity Arts Festival in 2019 and 2020.

Her work focuses on presenting and interpreting cultural traditions in contemporary contexts. Mayuri serves as the artistic director of Nritarutya (founded in 2000); a dance organsiation based in Bengaluru.

==== Artistic director: Nritarutya ====
Adhyaya, is Nritarutya's festival of dance, celebrating innovation and tradition. It programs and showcases works for Bangalore audiences, inviting artists from across the world with works that are a combination of "innovation and tradition". For the first time in 2018, Adhyaya opened its doors to applications from artists the world over seeking an avant-garde platform to perform their works in, receiving 120 entries.

Mayuri's experimental creation initiative Prayog, is a festival that commissions and showcases out-of-the-box Indian dance compositions. All the commissions follow the rule of interpreting mythology in contemporary ways, and is often a mix of designers, musicians, painters, choreographers, dancers, and theatre artists.

She received critical acclaim in 2004 with her work ‘Ardhanarishwara’, which talked about the masculinity and the femininity residing within each of us. Oum, Yantra, Footnote, Dwandwa, are few of her earliest works.

After a commission by the Wadiyar of Mysore to create a piece for their kul-devi (a family deity), Mayuri choreographed the highly acclaimed and successful ‘Kali’ in the year 2008, which talks about the deepest recesses of one's unconsciousness.

‘Parched – 1st Cut’, was created for the Serendipity Arts Festival 2016. The scarcity of water, humankind's mistakes and the obscure truth of our future the highlights of this piece. ‘Parched – Choreographer’s Cut’ is a work-in-progress full length production which Mayuri is working on currently.

==== Other independent work ====
In 2019, Mayuri choreographed the musical Raunaq and Jassi, directed by Feroze Abbas Khan, and produced by Book My Show. It is a Punjabi take on Romeo and Juliet. Her expertise is sought to choreograph on typical Punjabi folk numbers in the musical.

In 2015, Mayuri won the prestigious Uday Shankar Award for Choreography.

The same year, she was commissioned by the Prime Minister of India to create a special dance sequence for the Make In India week in Germany, following which, she was commissioned again to create another piece for the Make In India Week in Mumbai, in 2016. Make In India inaugural dance sequence won the European Event Award for the Best Cultural Performance.

In 2012, she also performed with the Raghu Dixit Project for Queen Elizabeth’s Jubilee Celebrations in the UK.

Over the past years, Mayuri has also worked with various fashion designers, like Abu Jaani - Sandeep Khosla, Tarun Tahiliani, Sabyasachi, Anju Modi, Hemant Trivedi, Manish Arora and Wendell Rodricks, and choreographed dance pieces inspired by their fashion lines.

She is also the only choreographer who was invited to create a concept choreography commemorating the martyrs of the 26/11 shooting. It featured megastar Shri Amitabh Bachchan. Event was titled '26/11 - Stories of Strength', a memorial event organised by The Indian Express Group

Mayuri is one of the judges for the dancing reality shows Dancing Stars Seasons 2 and 3 (a BBC production), Master Dancer (a Viacom 18 production on Colors Network) and Dancing Champion (a Lokesh Productions).

=== Popular works and projects ===
- Kalank (Bollywood, Dharma Productions Film) - Creative consultant and concept design for the song ‘Ghar More Pardesiya’
- Shikara (Bollywood, Vidhu Vinod Chopra Film) - Concept and choreography for the song "Mar Jaye hum"
- Raunaq and Jassi (musical)
- Mughal-E-Azam (musical)
- Dancing Stars Seasons 2 & 3 (Dance Reality show)
- Master Dancer (Dance Reality Show)
- Madhushala (musical)
- Madhur Milan (musical)
- Make In India Ceremony (Stage creation)
- Parched (Contemporary work)
- Pro Kabbadi League (Stage creation)
- Mirzya (Bollywood)
- Featured in Teachers Genuine Stories - hosted by Rahul Bose featured an exclusive segment on Mayuri and her journey.
- Dewarists Season 3 Finale (Musical TV Series)
- Teaching For Artistic Innovation (Dance in Education Program)
- Choreographed for Mahashivratri celebrations at IshaCenter (2017)
- PATA (Stage)
- Queen Elizabeth's Golden Jubilee Celebration at Windsor Castle (represented Asia)
- Ijjodu (Kannada film) - Choreography for the movie
- Thamassu (Kannada Film) - Choreography for the title song "thamassu"
- Pancharangi (Kannada Film) - Choreography for the song "udisuve"

== Television ==
Year	Show	Channel	Notes
2015	Dancing Star 2	ETV Kannada	
2016	Dancing Star 3	ETV Kannada	
2022	Dancing Champion	Colors Kannada	

=== Awards ===
- Broadway World Award for Best Choreographer for Mughal-E-Azam (2018)
- Mysore Rotary's women Achiever award - in recognition of her contribution in arts, felicitated by Smt.Gayathri Devi- The queen of Mysore. (2018)
- "Manav Ratna" award for contribution in the field of Arts and Culture (2013)
- International Competition for choreography concept, South Korea (2012)
- RAPA Best Choreographer Award for Television Commercials, Chennai (2005)
- Young Women's Achievement Award (2004)
- Uday Shankar Award
