= Prahlad Acharya =

Magician

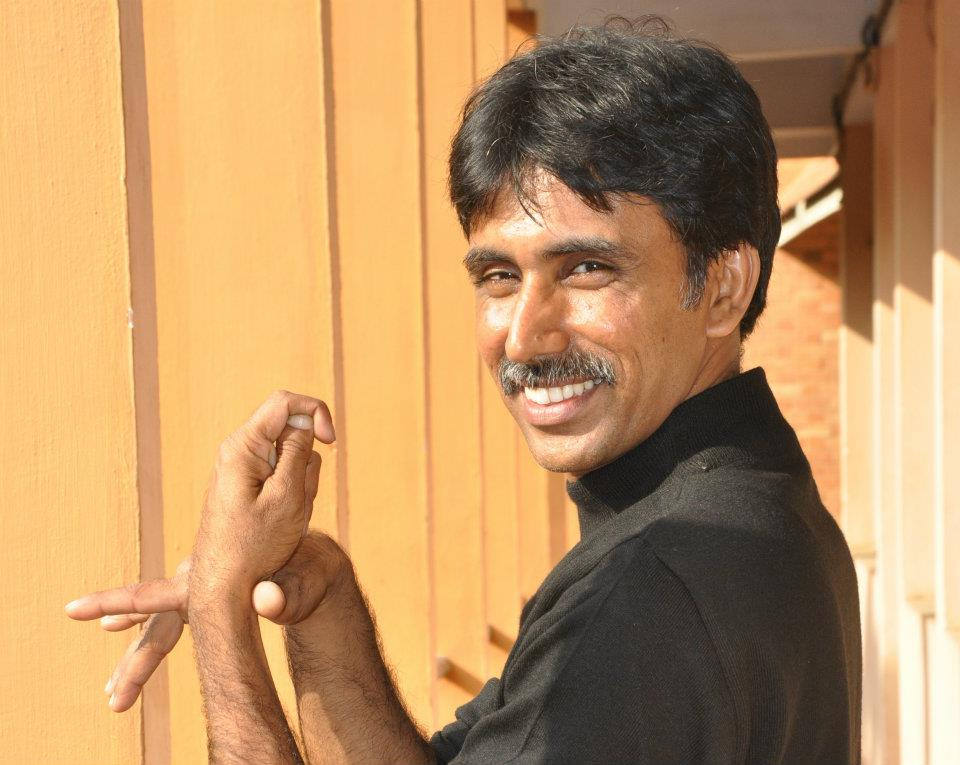
- Born: 14 March 1971 (age 55); Karnataka, India
- Occupations: Magician and illusionist
- Spouse: Poornima Acharya
- Website: www.prahladacharya.com

Prahlad Acharya (born 1973) is a magician, illusionist, escapologist, and stunt performer from Udupi, Karnataka, India. Known for his escape acts, Prahlad has been termed Indian Houdini by the Indian media. He also performs ventriloquism and shadow play. His show is called Maya Jadoo, which is a 20-member performance of Indian illusions. Prahlad calls his combination of drama and magic "dramagic"

He is married to Poornima Acharya, who is also a magician.

== Achievements ==
Prahlad's performances include:

- Escape from Bangalore Central Prison within 10 seconds on 10 December 2001
- Unique Shadow Play Performance at Gili Gili 2001 - the International Magicians' Convention at Udupi in November 2001
- Udupi Golden Chariot Vanish at Udupi Sri Krishna Temple on 1 September 2001
- 1000th Magical Performance of MAYA JADOO, at the PPC Auditorium, Udupi on 7 April 2001
- Car Vanishing Act at the Karavali Utsav, Mangalore on 14 February 2001
- Outstanding Magician Award at Vismayam 2000 - the International Magicians' Convention at Trivandrum, Kerala in December 2000
- Houdini escape at the Jog Falls, the India's tallest waterfall on 20 May 2000
- Gold Medal for Ventriloquism & Silver Medal for Close Up Magic at the Golden Magic Conference at Kanhangad, Kerala in November 1999
- Escape from the Maximum Security Prison at Bellary within eight seconds on 2 October 1999
- Magic-on-wheels to create election awareness in Udupi District in 1998
- Founded the Magic & Allied Arts Development & Research Institute in Udupi on 14 January 1998
- Performance of the Legendary Indian Rope Trick at Kadekar, Udupi in November 1997
- Jagruti Rally - A blind-fold drive for AIDS Awareness from Mangalore in Karnataka to Panjim in Goa in May 1995.
- Agnivyooha Chhedana (Escape from the Castle of Fire) at Udupi in September 1994.
- Chinese Torture Cell Escape at Udupi in 1994.
- Underwater Houdini Escape at Madhwa Sarovar in Udupi in 1993.
