= Meghana Raj =

Indian actress

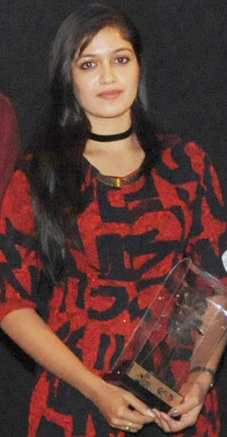
- Raj in 2016
- Born: Meghana Sundar Raj; Bangalore, Karnataka, India
- Education: Christ University
- Years active: 2009–present
- Spouse: Chiranjeevi Sarja (m. 2018; died 2020)
- Children: 1
- Parents: Sundar Raj (father); Pramila Joshai (mother)
- Relatives: Sarja family

Meghana Sundar Raj Sarja is an Indian actress who primarily works in Malayalam and Kannada films along with a few Telugu and Tamil films. She made her acting debut in the 2009 Telugu film Bendu Apparao R.M.P. She has won Karnataka State Film Award for Best Actress for her performance in Iruvudellava Bittu, a 2018 Kannada film.

== Early life ==
Meghana Raj was born as the only daughter to film actors Sundar Raj and Pramila Joshai. Her father Sundar has acted in more than 180 films, predominantly in Kannada language, while her mother Pramila is also a noted Kannada film producer. She completed her schooling from Baldwin Girls' High School and holds Bachelor's degree in psychology at Christ University, Bangalore.

== Acting career ==
=== 2009–11: Debut, breakthrough and setback ===
Meghana Raj debuted as a theatre artist, when she was a child, acting alongside her father in the play Jokumaraswamy. During the audio launch function of the Tamil film Poi in February 2006, she was invited by its director K. Balachander to pursue an acting career, starring in one of his forthcoming films. Accepting his offer, she was given the lead female role in the Tamil film Krishnaleelai, a Balachander production, directed by Selvan. However, despite continuing shooting throughout 2008, which was completed in early 2009, the film got stuck in production hell, and its release got delayed for various reasons.

Even before the release of that film, she commenced shooting for a Telugu film Bendu Apparao R.M.P, which would eventually be her first feature film release. She played the character of a school teacher in the comedy entertainer, starring Allari Naresh and Kamna Jethmalani as well, which released in October 2009 and went on to become highly successful at the box office. She debuted in the Kannada films by enacting the female lead role in Punda, a remake of the 2007 Tamil film Polladhavan. Meghana's next release was her debut Tamil film, the Boopathy Pandian-directed Kaadhal Solla Vandhen, while she also signed up her first Malayalam project, the horror film Yakshiyum Njanum under Vinayan's direction, which was released in August 2010. Although the film was just an average grosser, its glamorous and sensual songs on Meghana was a hit among the youth and made her an instant favorite among the youth. During that time she also acted in two more projects, Nanda Nanditha, which is a remake of the 2008 Kannada film Nanda Loves Nanditha and the Tamil film Kalla Siripazhaga.

=== 2011–13: Beautiful and commercial success ===
Meghana starred in the Malayalam film Beautiful which was released in December. The film was a success both commercially and critically, with critics regarding it as one of the best Malayalam movies of 2011. Meghana's portrayal of Anjali, a home nurse in the film won her very good reviews. Since getting noticed with Beautiful, Meghana got a lot of Malayalam films offers and was briefly the most sought out actress in Malayalam. It was during this time when Meghana started to undergo a total physique revamp by going through a strict diet and exercise regime.

Her 2012 Malayalam film Namukku Parkkan did a decent business at the box office. Subsequent films Mullamottum Munthiricharum, Banking Hours 10 to 4, Maad Dad, Madirasi and Red Wine failed to perform at the box office. However, her next film Memories opposite Prithviraj Sukumaran opened to overwhelmingly positive reviews and was a box office success.

=== 2013–15: Second wind in Sandalwood and continuing success ===
Meghana Raj returned to Kannada films in late 2013 with the film Raja Huli, followed by Bahuparak; her performances in both films were well appreciated. Meghana's next Kannada movie Aatagara was released in late August 2015 to both critical and commercial acclaim.

=== 2016 onwards ===
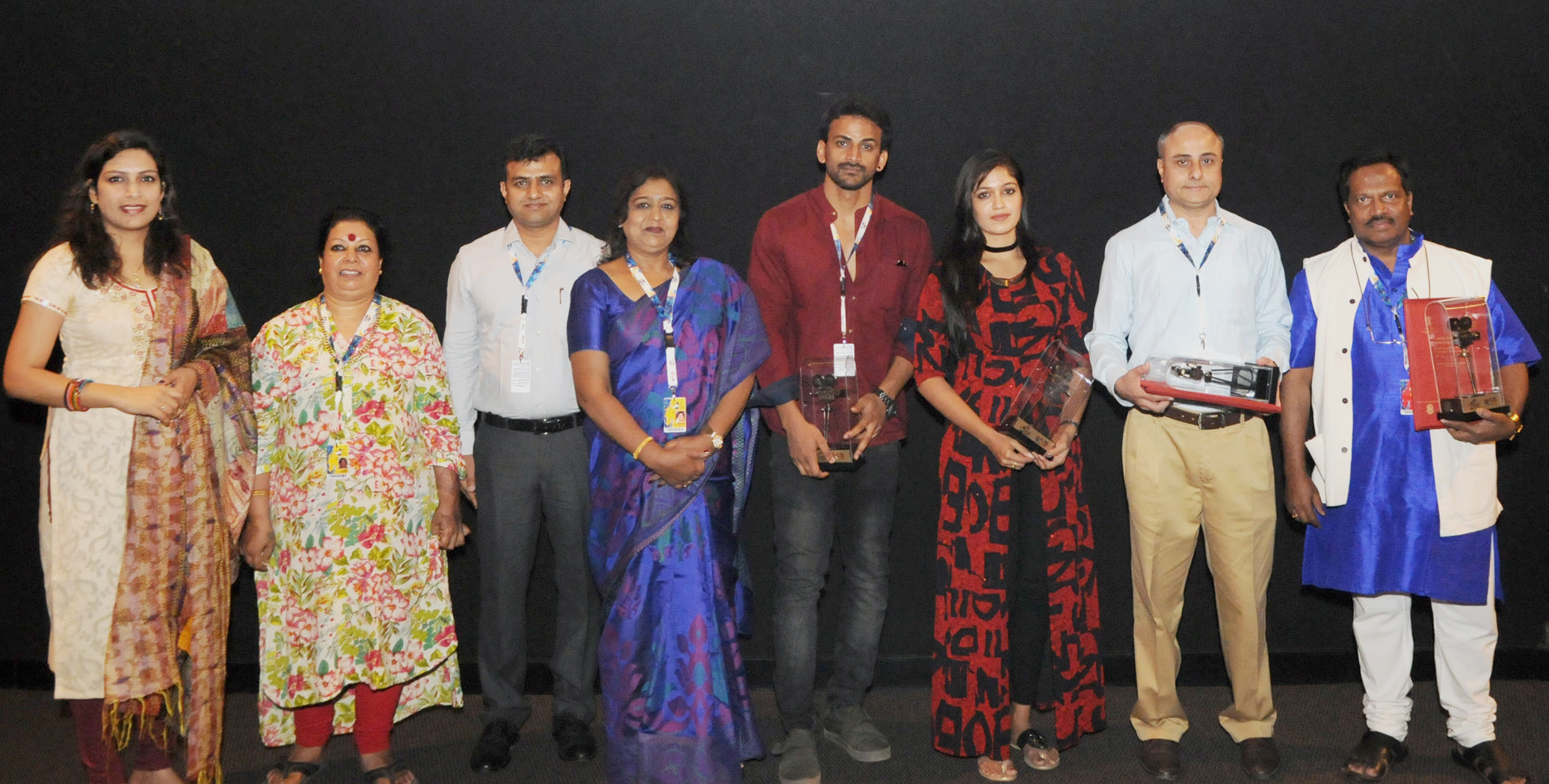
Raj at the presentation of the film ‘Allama’, during the 47th International Film Festival of India (IFFI-2016), in Panaji, Goa on 26 November 2016, along with the cast of the film

Post 2016 Meghana Raj starred in Hallelooya, Lakshmana, Bhujanga and Allama. Meghana was later chosen to portray princess Bhanumati in the Kannada magnum opus Kurukshetra.

== Personal life ==
After a 10-year relationship with fellow Kannada actor Chiranjeevi Sarja, Meghana got engaged to him on 22 October 2017. They got married on 2 May 2018. Sarja died on 7 June 2020 from cardiac arrest when Meghana was expecting their first child. Their son, Raayan Raj Sarja, was born on 22 October 2020.

== Filmography ==
Year	Film	Role	Language	Notes
2009	Bendu Apparao R.M.P	Gayatri	Telugu	
2010	Punda	Megha	Kannada	Suvarna Film Award for Best Debut Actress in Kannada
2010	Kaadhal Solla Vandhen	Sandhya Panchacharam	Tamil	
2010	Yakshiyum Njanum	Aathira	Malayalam	
2011	August 15	Lakshmi	Malayalam	
2011	Raghuvinte Swantham Rasiya	Rasiya	Malayalam	
2011	Uyarthiru 420	Iyal	Tamil	
2011	Pachuvum Kovalanum	Sukanya	Malayalam	
2011	Beautiful	Anjali / Annie	Malayalam	The Kochi Times Film Award for Promising Newcomer; Nominated – Filmfare Award for Best Supporting Actress – Malayalam
2011	Ponnu Kondoru Aalroopam		Malayalam	
2012	Nanda Nanditha	Nandhitha	Tamil; Telugu	Bilingual film
2012	Achante Aanmakkal	Meera	Malayalam	
2012	Namukku Parkkan	Renuka	Malayalam	
2012	Mullamottum Munthiricharum	Suchitra	Malayalam	
2012	Banking Hours 10 to 4	Revathy	Malayalam	
2012	Lucky	Janaki	Telugu	
2012	Poppins		Malayalam	
2012	Madirasi	Maya	Malayalam	
2013	Maad Dad	Annamma	Malayalam	
2013	Red Wine	Ann Mary	Malayalam	
2013	Up & Down: Mukalil Oralundu	Deepa	Malayalam	
2013	Memories	Teena	Malayalam	
2013	Good Bad & Ugly	Kavya	Malayalam	
2013	Raja Huli	Kaveri	Kannada	
2014	Bahuparak	Sneha / Preethi	Kannada	
2014	100 Degree Celsius	Revathy	Malayalam	Also playback singer for song "Pacha Manja"
2014	The Dolphins	Mridula	Malayalam	
2015	Aatagara	Sakshi	Kannada	
2015	Vamshodharaka		Kannada	
2016	Hallelooya	Dr. Meera Menon	Malayalam	
2016	Lakshmana	Anjali	Kannada	
2016	Bhujanga	Rachana	Kannada	
2017	Allama	Maya	Kannada	
2017	Noorondu Nenapu	Shruthi Aras	Kannada	
2017	Jindaa		Kannada	
2018	MMCH	Megha	Kannada	
2018	Iruvudellava Bittu	Poorvi	Kannada	Karnataka State Film Award for Best Actress; Nominated – Filmfare Award for Best Actress – Kannada; Nominated – Filmibeat Award for Best Actress – Kannada
2019	Zebra Varakal	Hanna	Malayalam	
2019	Onti	Paaru	Kannada	
2019	Kurukshetra	Bhanumati	Kannada	
2022	Selfie Mummy Googl Daddy	Shalini	Kannada	
2023	Tatsama Tadbhava	Akira / Arika	Kannada	
2026	Amartha	Lakshmi	Kannada	
2026	Jailer 2	Revathi	Tamil	
2026	Ottakomban †	TBA	Malayalam	Completed
2026	Sangeetha Bar and Restaurant †	TBA	Kannada	Completed
2026	Buddhivanta 2†	Samantha D’Souza	Kannada	Completed

=== As singer ===
Year	Song	Film	Language	Notes
2014	Simple Preeti	Bahuparak	Kannada	Sung with Srinagar Kitty
2014	Pacha Manja	100 Degree Celsius	Malayalam	
2019	What a Beautifullu Hudugi	Sinnga	Kannada	Sung with Naveen Sajju
2020	Allondhu Neeli Bhanu	Shivarjuna	Kannada	Sung with Sanjith Hegde

Television

Year	Show	Role	Channel	Notes
2022	Dancing Champion	Judge	Colors Kannada	
2026	Kwatle Kitchen 2	Judge	Colors Kannada	

== Awards and nominations ==
- 2011: The Kochi Times Film Award for Promising Newcomer – Beautiful
- 2011: Suvarna Film Award for Best Debut Actress in Kannada – Punda
- 2012: Nominated – Filmfare Award for Best Supporting Actress – Malayalam – Beautiful
- 2018: Karnataka State Film Award for Best Actress – Iruvudellava Bittu
- 2019: Nominated – Filmfare Award for Best Actress – Kannada – Iruvudellava Bittu
- 2019: Nominated – Filmibeat Award for Best Actress – Kannada – Iruvudellava Bittu

== Public image ==
Meghana's official Facebook page has received more than 2.5 million likes. She was ranked No.19 in Kochi Times' 'Most desirable Woman 2015' poll was ranked No.10 in Bangalore Times' 'Most desirable Women 2015'.
