= Sapnon Ki Rani =

- Directed by: A. R. Babu
- Screenplay by: A. R. Babu
- Story by: A. R. Babu
- Produced by: Indramma; T. Gangaraju; Prasad
- Starring: Srujan Lokesh; Aishwarya Sindhogi; Niranjan Deshpande
- Cinematography: J. S. Wali
- Edited by: Suresh D. H.
- Music by: Dharma Vish
- Production company: Sun Shine Movies
- Release date: 31 July 2015
- Running time: 139 minutes
- Country: India
- Language: Kannada

Sapnon Ki Rani is a 2015 Indian Kannada romantic drama film directed by A. R. Babu, and stars Srujan Lokesh, Aishwarya Sindhogi and Niranjan Deshpande in the lead roles. The film's music is scored by Dharma Vish.

== Cast ==
- Srujan Lokesh as Krishna
- Aishwarya Sindhogi as Nandini
- Ashok Sharma as Ashok
- Tennis Krishna
- Chikkanna as Chikka
- Mithra
- Suchendra Prasad
- Girija Lokesh
- Niranjan Deshpande
- Shobaraj
- Laya Kokila

== Soundtrack ==
Sapnon Ki Rani

Soundtrack album by Dharma Vish
- Released: 15 December 2014
- Recorded: 2014
- Genre: Feature film soundtrack
- Label: Anand Audio
- Producer: Indramma Govindaraju

The film's soundtrack and original score is composed by Dharma Vish who composed Srujan Lokesh's previous venture Aane Pataki too. The soundtrack consists of 4 songs.

=== Track listing ===
No.	Title	Lyrics	Singer(s)	Length
1.	"Yappo Yappo"	V. Nagendra Prasad	Naveen Sajju
2.	"Yaare Nee Yaare"	V. Manohar	Deepak Doddera
3.	"Patta Patta"	Ravi Kiran	Tippu, Shamitha Malnad
4.	"Kya Ji Kissa"	Yogaraj Bhat	Vijay Prakash, Sunitha	04:06
Total length:				21:04

== Reception ==
=== Critical reception ===
Sunayana Suresh of The Times of India rated the film 2/5 stars and wrote, "This is a good story on paper, but the fact that there have been many hands that have directed this film may be the reason for it to being a mish-mash of an effort".
