= Majaa Talkies =

Comedy show on Colors Kannada

- Title snapshot of Majaa Talkies
- Genre: Comedy
- Directed by: Tejaswi
- Presented by: Srujan Lokesh
- Theme music composer: V. Manohar
- Country of origin: India
- Original language: Kannada
- No. of episodes: 212 (list of episodes)

Production
- Producer: Srujan Lokesh
- Production locations: Kanteerava Studios, Bengaluru; India
- Running time: Approx. 45 minutes
- Production company: Lokesh Productions

Original release
- Network: ETV Kannada / Colors Kannada; Colors Super (Super Season)
- Release: 7 February 2015 – 2020

Majaa Talkies is an Indian sketch comedy show that premiered on ETV Kannada (now Colors Kannada) on 7 February 2015. The episodes focus on comical scripts and usually feature celebrity guests who are invited on the show to promote their latest films in the comedy-focused talk show format. The show became Karnataka's highest rated scripted TV show in June 2015. As of September 2015, the show achieved maximum TRP and obtained the number one spot in Kannada television.

The show is hosted and directed by Srujan Lokesh, a popular artist of the Kannada Cinema. The format of the show was said to be based on a popular Hindi show aired on Colors TV, Comedy Nights with Kapil hosted by Kapil Sharma. However, Srujan Lokesh considers it as a sequel to Maja with Sruja, a comedy show that aired on Asianet Suvarna during 2010-11, hosted by Srujan himself.

The cast of the show includes filmmaker Indrajit Lankesh as a permanent celebrity judge as well as veterans in the field of Kannada cinema and theatre such as Mimicry Dayanand, V. Manohar and Mandya Ramesh. V Manohar also composed the title song for the show. The set for the show was created at Kanteerava Studios, Bengaluru and episodes are shot there. The show has seen almost all celebrities of Kannada film industry. Season 2 is titled Majaa Talkies Super Season.

== Cast ==
Main Cast of Majaa Talkies

The cast of the show mainly contains Srujan Lokesh, Indrajit Lankesh, Shwetha Chengappa, Aparna, Mimicry Dayanand and V Manohar with permanent characters. Pavan Kumar, Rajashekhar and many other artists have no fixed character and play different characters as per the scripts. Mandya Ramesh, Kuri Prathap and Naveen Padil were added to the main cast later in the show with permanent characters. Recurring cast with fixed characters include Vandana Dayanand and Rajini. The table below briefs about the cast and characters in detail.

Name	Character	Description
Srujan Lokesh	Host / Srujan	Srujan is the main character of the show. He hosts the show while being the part of the scripted comedy. He is the tenant of Dayanand, on the show and it is portrayed that he owes rent to the landlord for an undisclosed period of time. He continues to be the resident of Dayanand's house with the help of Honey, Dayanand's Daughter. Honey is also Srujan's romantic interest. His wife is Rani, and it is shown that the couple haven't been happy since they have married.
Indrajith Lankesh	Permanent Guest	Indrajith Lankesh is seated as a permanent guest in the show. He is often interactive with the script but majorly seen enjoying the happenings of the house. The script involves a secret and undisclosed love story between Indrajith and Varalakshmi. He is referred as 'Mr. Lankesh' by Srujan and he refers Srujan as 'Mr. Lokesh' which is a symbolic portrayal of friendship between their fathers. He is also referred as 'Ijila' by Varalakshmi.
Shwetha Chengappa	Rani	Rani is Srujan's wife on the show. She is a main character portraying a common Indian homemaker. She is often said to worship and believe in 'Morning Band Guruji', a television astrologer who suggests solutions that make no sense to various problems she faces. She is happy with her husband, however Srujan considers their marriage is a tragedy in his life.
Aparna Vastarey	Varalakshmi	Varalakshmi, often referred as 'Varu' is the elder sister of Rani and Muddesh. She is shown to be unmarried and interested in Ijila (Indrajinth Lankesh). She considers herself a celebrity, calls herself as 'One and Only Varalakshmi'. She is usually seen fooling around saying that her contacts extend from regional celebrities to big names of the world including Barack Obama.
Mimicry Dayanand	Dayanand	Dayanand is the landlord of the house that Srujan and his family lives in, and is always shown demanding the rent Srujan owes him. His daughter Honey is Srujan's romantic interest. Dayanand, however, is aware of this and shown to be protective about his daughter.
V Manohar	Bhatta	Bhatta is the cook of Srujan's house and always shown to experiment on cooking. He often composes comical lyrics for popular songs and sings it on the show as a part of the script. He shares a similarity of being bald with Indrajith Lankesh.
Pavan Kumar	Various characters	Pavan has appeared in almost all the episodes portraying various characters and parodies of famous people. He has no permanent character unlike Srujan, Shwetha, Aparna, Dayanand or Mandya Ramesh but portrayed as an essential addition for the script as the script's storyline would always feature a central character which is portrayed by Pavan.
Kuri Prathap	Kadle Puri	Kadle Puri debuted into the main cast on the 114th episode of Majaa Talkies. He was introduced as the groom for Varalakshmi by Muddesh. He is said to be a businessman who had a camel-grooming business in Dubai. He addresses Srujan as 'Cobra' and Rani as 'Zebra'.
Mandya Ramesh	Muddesha	Muddesha was introduced in the show much later than the rest of the cast, in the 23rd episode. He is the younger brother of Varalakshmi and elder brother of Rani. He is shown to have fights with Srujan, his brother-in-law often for silly reasons. He is shown to be always in search of a bride for him on the show.
Rajashekhar	Various characters	Similar to Pavan, Rajashekhar has no permanent character. However, he is scripted into the storyline portraying various characters sometimes paired with Pawan. He is also one of the scriptwriters of the show.
Naveen Padil	Kotiyappa	Kotiyappa (Naveen Padil), introduced as 'Kandalli Gundu Kotiyappa' plays father-in-law of Srujan, father of Rani, Varalakshmi and Muddesha. He is shown to be an all-time boozer. He is addressed as 'Gundu Mava' by Srujan.
Usha Bhandari	Ajji	Ajji was shown to be the maternal grandmother of Srujan, she used to get disturbed by the noise in the house. She usually came out yelling about the events taking place in the house. The last appearance of Ajji was in the 16th episode. This character is no more seen in the show and there has been no official word about the absence of the character.
Vandana Dayanand	Honey	Honey is the daughter of Dayanand, the landlord. She is portrayed as a romantic interest for Srujan. She is seen helping Srujan when her father demands the money he owes him. However, Rani opposes her being nice to Srujan and Dayanand is shown to be protective about his daughter when Srujan tries to flirt with her. This character was gradually minimized after the introduction of Rajini in the main cast but recurred several times after the show shifted to the new house set.
Apoorva Bharadwaj	Sakkre Uma / Saroja	Apoorva has appeared in most of the episodes portraying various characters, most prominent ones being 'Sakkre Uma' and 'Saroja'. She was usually scripted to be paired with Pavan on the show. She had no permanent character initially.
Shalini Prakash	Various characters	Shalini has appeared in a few episodes portraying various characters for the script. She is a choreographer and also a part of the show's crew.
Anushree Bhat	Various characters	Anushree appeared in the show often portraying various characters as a part of the scripted storyline.
Usha Kokila	Various characters	Usha has been a part of few episodes portraying various roles. She is famous for her unique way of pronouncing 'Super' on the show. She often leads the show's band and performs for the show.
Rajini Amrutha	Rajini	Rajini was introduced on the 62nd episode as a main character in the show. She is portrayed as a furious lady and shown to be the new tenant for the upper portion of the house where Srujan and his family lives. She is sometimes shown to have issues with Rani.
Legend: Current Cast Recurring Cast Previous Cast Characters Introduced in the Plot Characters Introduced Later

Characters are listed in the order of their introduction on the show.

== Band ==
The band of the show is referred as Noise Pollution by Srujan. Rekha Mohan (referred as ReMo) leads the band and she has appeared in most of the episodes. She sings various songs, sometimes with adaptions to the original lyrics suitable for the script. She often gets involved as a part of the script in the show. Usha Kokila has taken the lead in the absence of ReMo a few times. The band includes Mohan Karkala with the keyboard, Kamal Bob with the rhythm pad and two guitarists. ReMo and Mohan are often included in staged segments and are usually taunted at by Srujan on the show. Other artists have also performed along with ReMo in the band.

== House set ==
The newly created house set for Majaa Talkies

From the inaugural episode, the show is shot in a set resembling a house created at Kanteerava Studios at Bengaluru. The set depicts a typical living area of a modern house complete with luxury seating for guests, a wall of the room which is said to be Rani's, through the door of which she usually enters the hall, a kitchen, a staircase connecting to the upper part of the house where Rajini is shown to be living in. Multiple ways exist to enter the hall; including the back hallway behind the seating through which Srujan usually enters. An area beside kitchen is reserved for the band and a solo seating is placed for Indrajith Lankesh to the opposite of the main set.

The set was revamped from episode 150 and an entirely new house was created reflecting a luxurious apartment. It is said that the people behind the creation of the new set were the same who worked on the set of Comedy Nights with Kapil. The new set appears bigger than the old one with inclusions of a new fireplace behind the guest seating, new entry points and a new staircase. A television appears above the new fireplace. The kitchen has been removed and a large window is placed in the background wall.

== Episodes ==
The episodes are usually one hour long with commercials, air from 8:00 PM to 9:00 PM on weekends. The format followed included a scripted act from the cast in the initial segment followed by the segment that introduced and interacted with the guests invited for the episode. This was slightly altered after the introduction of the new house for the show where the guests are now introduced at the beginning and all the scripted acts proceed with them in the background, sometimes involving them. The guests usually would be from an upcoming movie for its promotion through the show. Apart from movie promotions, the show also features guests from other respects.

The show often airs two-hour special episodes touted as 'Mega Episodes' from 8:00 PM to 10:00 PM. The episode run time would be around 90 minutes excluding the commercial slots. This is usually done when the timeslot for the next day's episode would be unavailable due to various reasons. Some one-hour episodes continue for the next day, making them a two-day special episodes. Several special episodes and crossovers in conjunction with other shows broadcast on Colors Kannada have also been aired.

It was earlier said in a press meet that there will be 104 episodes in the first season by Srujan Lokesh himself. However, the show has crossed 104 episodes.

=== Special episodes and spin-offs ===
Episode Title	Telecast Date	Notes
Dancing Talkies	25 April 2015	Various promotional programs were telecast prior to the official launch of Colors Kannada, which was rebranded due to the takeover of then ETV Kannada by Viacom 18. As a part of the promotion, Majaa Talkies and Dancing Stars Season 2 were merged for a one-time-venture called as Dancing Talkies. The merger was hosted by both Srujan Lokesh (host of Majaa Talkies) and Akul Balaji (host of Dancing Stars Season 2). The show integrated game show for the cast of Majaa Talkies and participants of Dancing Stars Season 2 and was presented in the theme of Super Minute, a game show based on Minute to win it which was hosted by Ganesh and telecasted on the channel previously. The show starred V Ravichandran, Priyamani, Mayuri Upadhya (the judging panel of Dancing Stars Season 2) and Indrajit Lankesh himself as guests. The contestants of Dancing Stars Season 2 and the cast of Majaa Talkies were the audience for this episode. The episode was aired on 25 and 26 April 2015 and the running time was around 135 minutes combined.
Dancing Talkies	26 April 2015	
Majaa Party	1 January 2016	A special episode was aired at 9 AM on 1 January 2016, as a part of the New Year Celebrations. This episode was aired in the morning, unlike the usual evening telecast patterns of Majaa Talkies. This episode promoted the movie Kismat and the guests were Vijay Raghavendra, Spandana Vijay, Sangeetha Bhat from the movie. Members of The Raghu Dixit Project along with Raghu Dixit and DJ Alok and his team prfomred at the show. Kavitha (Lakshmi Baramma fame) was also invited as the guest for the show.
Making of Majaa Santhe	15 May 2016	Majaa Santhe was a spin-off in collaboration with Serial Santhe show of Colors Kannada. This episode was the first outdoor, open-stage venture for Majaa Talkies and was held at Ranebennuru in front of a big crowd. The 'making' was telecast on Sunday, 15 May 2016 and was anchored by Apeksha. This program covered the journey of the team from Bangalore to Ranebennuru and included interviews of the cast and crew. The team was welcomed at SJM Women's College at Ranebennur where a public address and an interactive session was held. The backstage interviews from Majaa Santhe were also telecast in the show. The main event, Majaa Santhe was aired on Sunday, 22 May 2016 at 5:00 PM on Colors Kannada and included skits and dance performances from every member of the cast. All the current cast (except Naveen Padil) and the recurring cast (except Rajini) were present and performed at the show. Kannada playback singer Indu Nagaraj and Kannada actress Mayuri were invited to the show and they performed with the team.
Majaa Santhe	22 May 2016	

== Broadcast ==
The show broadcasts on Saturdays and Sundays on Colors Kannada at 8:00 PM IST. All episodes are also available online in full length on the official YouTube channel of Colors Kannada and the online streaming platform Voot after the original airing. Since Colors Kannada launched the HD simulcast version of the channel on 1 May 2016, Majaa Talkies is also available in HD format. Episode 124 was the first episode to be aired in HD.

== Awards and nominations ==
Year	Award	Category	Nominee	Result
2015	Colors Kannada Anubandha Awards 2015	Jana Mecchida Samsara (Favorite Family)	Majaa Talkies	Nominated
2015	Colors Kannada Anubandha Awards 2015	Jana Mecchida Jodi (Favorite Couple)	Srujan - Shwetha	Nominated
2015	Colors Kannada Anubandha Awards 2015	Jana Mecchida (Favorite) Style Icon - Male	Srujan Lokesh	Nominated
2015	Colors Kannada Anubandha Awards 2015	Jana Mecchida (Favorite) Style Icon - Female	Shwetha Chengappa	Nominated
2015	Colors Kannada Anubandha Awards 2015	Jana Mecchida Nayaki (Favorite Actress)	Shwetha Chengappa	Nominated
2015	Colors Kannada Anubandha Awards 2015	Jana Mecchida (Favorite) Youth Icon	Srujan Lokesh	Nominated
2015	Colors Kannada Anubandha Awards 2015	Jana Mecchida Hadu (Favorite Title Song)	Majaa Talkies	Nominated
2015	Colors Kannada Anubandha Awards 2015	Mane Mecchida Mathina Malla (Best Orator)	Srujan Lokesh	Won
2015	Colors Kannada Anubandha Awards 2015	Mane Mecchicda (Best) Non-Fiction Show	Majaa Talkies	Nominated
2016	Colors Kannada Anubandha Awards 2016	Jana Mecchida Samsara (Favorite Family)	Majaa Talkies	Nominated
2016	Colors Kannada Anubandha Awards 2016	Jana Mecchida (Favorite) Youth Icon	Srujan Lokesh	Won
2016	Colors Kannada Anubandha Awards 2016	Jana Mecchida Vidushaka (Favorite Comedian)	Mandya Ramesh	Won
2016	Colors Kannada Anubandha Awards 2016	Jana Mecchida Vidushaka (Favorite Comedian)	Pavan Kumar	Nominated
2016	Colors Kannada Anubandha Awards 2016	Mane Mecchida (Best) Non-Fiction Show	Majaa Talkies	Won
2017	Colors Kannada Anubandha Awards 2017	Jana Mecchida Vidushaka (Favorite Comedian)	Kuri Prathap	Won
2017	Colors Kannada Anubandha Awards 2017	Best Director	Srujan Lokesh	Won
2017	Colors Kannada Anubandha Awards 2017	Jana Mecchida Samsara (Favorite Family)	Majaa Talkies	Won

== Sponsorships ==
The show had numerous sponsors from the launch. The usual pattern followed included a primary and a secondary sponsor for the show. For few episodes, the show even grabbed two secondary sponsors when the viewership was at its peak.

== History ==
During 2009-10, director Vijaya Prasad who was well known for his famous directorial venture Silli Lalli put Srujan Lokesh in the lead and started a satire comedy show called Maja with Sruja which was aired on Asianet Suvarna Though Vijaya Prasad appeared in few episodes, his identity was never revealed in the show. Srujan Lokesh hosted the show and veterans like Mimicry Dayanand, Arun Sagar and Antony Kamal were a part of the comedy focused talk show. Celebrities were being invited for casual talk as well as film promotions. The show ended in 2011 despite being highly appreciated by the viewers. Srujan Lokesh hinted about a new season in the finale episode of Maja with Sruja but this did not happen. Srujan Lokesh then became busy with his home production Lokesh Productions and produced different shows including Kaasige Toss and Chota Champion. He also hosted and judged a cookery reality show Kitchen Kiladigalu with Sihi Kahi Chandru in 2012. Later in 2013, Arun Sagar was roped in as a contestant for Season 1 of Bigg Boss Kannada by ETV Kannada where he stood out as the runner-up of the season. Vijaya Prasad started another sketch comedy show on ETV Kannada titled Comedy Circle with Arun Sagar, after he came back from the Bigg Boss house, Though this show appeared to be reincarnation of Maja with Sruja with all the recurring characters, it missed Srujan Lokesh on the show. The casting was expanded for the show, which included Arun Sagar, Shalini Sathyanarayan, Mimicry Dayanand, Antony Kamal, Mimicry Gopi, Mithra, and Girija Lokesh (Srujan Lokesh's mother) in the main cast. For unknown reasons, Arun Sagar was present only for first few episodes. Later, Shalini took up the hosting for Comedy Circle and the show successfully completed around 40 episodes. It is notable that, during the telecast of Comedy Circle, Srujan Lokesh was inside the Bigg Boss house as a contestant for the Season 2 of Bigg Boss Kannada which was aired on Asianet Suvarna. Srujan also ended up as the runner-up of the season.
