= Lokesh Productions =

- Industry: Entertainment
- Founded: 2013
- Founders: Girija Lokesh, Srujan Lokesh
- Headquarters: Bengaluru, India
- Key people: Srujan Lokesh
- Products: Television Programs; Reality Shows
- Number of employees: 300+

Lokesh Productions, based in Bengaluru, Karnataka, is an Indian production company best known for making non-fiction shows in the Kannada language. It was founded in 2013 by Girija Lokesh and Srujan Lokesh, wife and son of veteran Kannada actor Lokesh, son of Subbaiah Naidu, who was credited as the first hero of Kannada silent movies. The production house has produced several successful shows on television including Challenge, Chota Champion, and Kaasige Toss, all being reality shows. Currently, the house produces Majaa Talkies, a sketch comedy show which has been a huge hit among the Kannada audience.

== Productions ==
Show	Year	Channel	Notes
Challenge	2012–13	Zee Kannada	Reality show hosted by actor Rajesh. Task to win the show is remaining sleepless for maximum amount of time.
Kaasige Toss	2012–13	Zee Kannada	Game show hosted by Srujan Lokesh and Jahengir.
Chota Champion	2013–14	Zee Kannada	Game show for toddlers and children hosted by Srujan Lokesh.
Divided	2014–15	Zee Kannada	Game show hosted by Bigg Boss Kannada 2 contestant Rohith.
Majaa Talkies	2015–2018 (season 1)	Colors Kannada	Sketch comedy show hosted and directed by Srujan Lokesh, based on Comedy Nights with Kapil. Cast of the show includes Indrajith Lankesh, Shwetha Chengappa, Aparna, Mimicry Dayanand, V Manohar, Mandya Ramesh.
Majaa Takies Super Season	2018–2019	Colors Super	Sketch comedy show hosted and directed by Srujan Lokesh. Cast of the show includes Indrajith Lankesh, Shwetha Chengappa, Aparna, Mimicry Dayanand, Mandya Ramesh, Kuri Prathap.
Ivalu Sujatha	2019–2020	Colors Kannada	The Serial is official remake of Marathi Serial He Mann Baware on Colors Marathi.
Dancing Champion	2022	Colors Kannada	Reality show hosted by Akul Balaji. It features celebrities as contestants who are paired with professional dancers competing for a cash prize and the title Dancing Champion.
