= Srujan Lokesh =

Indian Kannada actor, television presenter

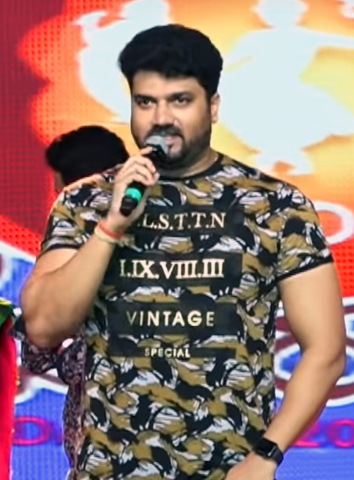
- Srujan Lokesh (2019)
- Born: 28 June 1980 (age 46); Bangalore, Karnataka, India
- Education: SSMRV college, Bengaluru
- Occupations: Actor, producer, television presenter
- Television: Maja with Sruja; Sye; Majaa Talkies
- Parents: Lokesh (father); Girija Lokesh (mother)
- Relatives: Subbaiah Naidu (grandfather)

Srujan Lokesh (born 28 June 1980) is an Indian actor, television presenter, radio presenter and producer who mainly works in the Kannada film industry.

== Production house ==
Lokesh Productions was founded by Srujan Lokesh and his mother Girija Lokesh in 2013. The production house has produced several shows on television including Challenge, Chota Champion and Kaasige Toss, all being reality shows. Currently, the house produces Majaa Talkies, a sketch comedy show.

== Awards and honours ==
- Suvarna Channel award: Best Anchor (2011)
- Bigg entertainment award: Most popular category Best Anchor (2011)
- Maadyama award: Best Anchor (2012, 2013)

== Filmography ==
Year	Film	Role	Other notes
1991	Veerappan		As a child actor
1990	Bhujangayyana Dashavathara		As a child actor
2002	Neela Megha Shyama	Shyama	
2004	Darshan	Sanjay	
2005	Lati Charge		
2007	Preetigagi		
2008	Navagraha	Gende	
2009	IPC Section 300		
2010	Porki		
2012	Chingari		
2012	Snehitaru	Parashurama	
2012	Edegarike	Bachchan	
2013	Andhar Bahar		
2013	Aane Pataaki	Biregowda	
2014	Typical Kailas	Kailas	
2014	Paramashiva		
2015	Sapnon Ki Rani		
2015	Love U Alia	Himself	Cameo appearance in the song "Kamakshi Kamakshi"
2016	Jaggu Dada	Majnu	
2017	Chakravarthy	Kittappa	
2017	Happy Journey	Arya	
2018	Bhootayyana Mommaga Ayyu	Narrator	As narrator
2019	Ellidde Illi Tanaka	Surya	
2022	Selfie Mummy Googl Daddy	Surya	
2025	GST	Lucky	Also director

== Television ==
Year	Title	Role	Ref.
2004	Kanavugal Aayiram (Tamil)	Rishi	
2011	Maja With Sruja	Host	
2011	Sye	Host	
2012	Kitchen Kiladigalu	Co-Host	
2012	Star Singer Grand Finale	Host	
2012	Suvarna Film Awards	Host	
2012	Sye 2	Host	
2012	Mummy No. 1	Host	
2013	Kaas Ge Toss	Host	
2013	Chota Champion	Host	
2014	Chota Champion 2	Host	
2014	Bigg Boss Kannada 2	Participant	
2015–2017	Majaa Talkies	Host	
2018– 2019	Majaa Talkies Super Season	Host	
2019	Comedy Talkies	Judge	
2020	Majaa Talkies	Host	
2021	Raja Rani	Judge	
2021 –	Nannamma Super Star	Judge	
2022	Gicchi Giligili	Judge	
2023–present	Family Gangstars	Host	
