= List of Kannada films of 2001 =

Kannada films of 2001

The following is a list of films produced in the Kannada film industry in India in 2001, presented in alphabetical order.

== Highest grossing films ==
Rank	Title	Collection	Ref.
1.	Kotigobba	₹12 crore (₹52.92 crore in 2025)	
2.	Diggajaru	₹10 crore (₹44.1 crore in 2025)	
3.	Huchcha	₹7 crore (₹30.87 crore in 2025)	
4.	Sri Manjunatha	₹6 crore (₹26.46 crore in 2025)	
5.	Nanna Preethiya Hudugi	₹4 crore (₹17.64 crore in 2025)	

== List of released films ==
Title	Director	Cast	Music director	Notes
Amma	D. Rajendra Babu	Ananth Nag, Lakshmi, Jai Jagadish	M. M. Keeravani	
Amma Nagamma	C. H. Balaji Singh Babu	Charan Raj, Damini, Ragasudha, Kumar Govind	Gopi Krishna	19 October release
Amma Ninna Tholinalli	Naganna	Ramesh Aravind, Shruti, Preethi, Bhavya, Avinash	Chaitanya	14 September release
Anjali Geethanjali	S. Narayan	S. Narayan, Anu Prabhakar, Prema, K. S. Ashwath	Prashanth Raj	20 April release
Asura	S. Mahendar	Shivarajkumar, Damini, Ananth Nag, Raghuvaran, Doddanna	Gurukiran	Remake of Tamil film Amarkkalam; 23 March release
Aunty Preethse	H. Vasu	Ananth Nag, Kushboo, Ramkumar, Anu Prabhakar, Balaraj, Master Anand	Chaitanya	Remake of Telugu film Aunty; 25 May release
Baanallu Neene Bhuviyallu Neene	S. Narayan	S. Narayan, Shashikumar, Divya Unni, Rekha Vedavyas	Prashanth Raj	Remake of Tamil film Veetla Visheshanga
Baava Baamaida	Kishore Sarja	Shivarajkumar, Rambha, Vinaya Prasad, Prakash Raj	Hamsalekha	Remake of Telugu film Bava Bavamaridi; 23 August release
Bahala Chennagide	M.S.Rajshekar	Shivarajkumar, Jaya Seal, Ruchita Prasad, Shashikumar	Koti	Remake of Telugu film Chala Bagundi; 25 July release
Chandana Chiguru	Rehman Pasha	Kumar Govind, Sudharani, H. G. Dattatreya, B. V. Radha	S. P. Chandrakanth	1 July release
Chitra	Dinesh Baboo	Nagendra Prasad, Rekha Vedavyas, Ananth Nag	Gurukiran	Remake of Telugu film Chitram
Chitte	Dinesh Baboo	Aniruddha Jatkar, Chaya Singh, Ananth Nag, Dwarakish, Damini	V. Manohar	
Diggajaru	D. Rajendra Babu	Vishnuvardhan, Ambareesh, Tara, Sanghavi, Lakshmi, Mansoor Ali Khan	Hamsalekha	Remake of Tamil film Natpukkaga; 26 January release
Ellara Mane Dosenu	H. S. Prakash	Ramkumar, Shruti, Mohan, Bhavana, Sanket Kashi, Suhasini, Darshan, Srinivasa Murthy	Hamsalekha	Remake of Tamil film Kaalam Maari Pochu; 30 March release
Gatti Mela	S. Mahendar	S. Mahendar, Shruti, Abhishek, Sharan, Bhavana, Doddanna	Hamsalekha	2 March release
Grama Devathe	Om Sai Prakash	Sai Kumar, Prema, Meena, Sridhar, Roja	Dhina	30 November release
Haalu Sakkare	Yogish Hunsur	Devaraj, Shashikumar, Jaggesh, S. Narayan, Suhasini, Archana, Damini	L. N. Shastry	
Hoo Anthiya Uhoo Anthiya	Praveen Kumar	Ramesh Aravind, Isha Koppikar, Anu Prabhakar	Karthik Raja	
Huchcha	Om Prakash Rao	Sudeep, Rekha Vedavyas, Bhavya, Avinash	Rajesh Ramnath	Remake of Tamil film Sethu... 6 July release
Jenu Goodu	S. Umesh	Devaraj, Kumar Govind, Shruti, Sithara, Umashree, Karibasavaiah	Prashanth Raj	Remake of Tamil film Koodi Vazhnthal Kodi Nanmai; 10 August release
Jipuna Nanna Ganda	J. G. Krishna	Jaggesh, Ravali, Umashree, Komal Kumar	Sadhu Kokila	Remake of Tamil film Budget Padmanabhan; 11 May release
Jithendra	Vishwanath	Jaggesh, Swarna, Shilpi, Deepa, Ramesh Bhat	Deva	13 April release
Jodi	Kishore Sarja	Shivarajkumar, Jaggesh, Poonam Singar, Doddanna, Mukhyamantri Chandru	S. A. Rajkumar	Remake of Malayalam film Darling Darling (2000 film); 7 December release
Kalla Police	Das	K. M. Rajendra, Ruchita Prasad, Doddanna	Prashanth Raj	
Kanasugara	Karan	V. Ravichandran, Prema, Mandya Ramesh, Shashikumar, Doddanna, Srinath	Rajesh Ramnath	Remake of Tamil film Unnidathil Ennai Koduthen; 3 August release
Kanoonu	J G Krishna	Devaraj, Charan Raj, B. C. Patil, Jayanthi, Anusha, Swarna	Sadhu Kokila	14 September release
Kothigalu Saar Kothigalu	Rajendra Singh Babu	Ramesh Aravind, S. Narayan, Mohan Shankar, Urvashi, Tara, Prema	Hamsalekha	28 December release
Kotigobba	Naganna	Vishnuvardhan, Priyanka Trivedi, Ashish Vidyarthi, Devaraj, Abhijeeth, Ramesh Bhat	Deva	Remake of Tamil film Baashha; 16 November release
Kurigalu Saar Kurigalu	Rajendra Singh Babu	Ramesh Aravind, S. Narayan, Mohan Shankar, Ruchita Prasad, Bhavana, Ananth Nag, Umashree	Hamsalekha	23 March release
Lankesha	B. C. Patil	B. C. Patil, Bhavana, Sheetal, Rami Reddy	Hamsalekha	23 Jan release
Maduve Aagona Baa	V. S. Reddy	Shivarajkumar, Laya, Shilpi, Sadhu Kokila, Sharan	Koti - M. M. Srilekha	Remake of Telugu film Pellichesukundam; 9 Feb release
Mafia	Anand P Raju	Vinod Alva, Thriller Manju, Charan Raj, Abhijeeth, Ragasudha, Srilalitha	Gopi Krishna	
Mahalakshmi	Karthik Raghunath	Ramesh Aravind, Kumar Govind, Shruti, Srinivasa Murthy	N. Govardhan	16 Feb release
Majnu	Dwarakish	Giri Dwarakish, Raga, Prakash Rai, Sharath Babu	Gurukiran	Remake of Tamil film Love Today; 31 August release
Mathadana	T. N. Seetharam	Ananth Nag, Tara, Devaraj, Avinash	C. Ashwath, V. Manohar	Based on S. L. Bhyrappa's novel 12 January release
Maya Jinke	G K Purushottam	Shobaraj, Soujanya Hegde, Bank Janardhan	Naveen - Praveen	12 January release
Mr. Harishchandra	R. C. Ranga	S. Narayan, Anu Prabhakar, Mohan Shankar, Darshan, Damini	Hamsalekha	31 August release
Mussanje	P. R. Ramadas Naidu	Dattatreya, Master Hirannaiah, Renukamma Murgod, Pavitra Lokesh	L. Vaidyanathan	
Mysore Huli	Tiger Prabhakar	Tiger Prabhakar, Ragasudha, Joe Simon, Sathyajith	Tiger Prabhakar	21 September release
Namma Samsara Ananda Sagara	J G Krishna	Shashikumar, Kumar Govind, Vinod Raj, Shwetha, Tara, Umashree, Archana	Prashanth Raj	26 October release
Nanna Preethiya Hudugi	Nagathihalli Chandrashekar	Dhyan, Deepali, Bhavya, Suresh Heblikar, Lokesh, Vijayalakshmi Singh	Mano Murthy	6 April release
Narahanthaka	B R Keshav	Kumar Govind, Thriller Manju, Anusha, Abhishek	Maruthi Meerajkar	7 September release
Neela	T. S. Nagabharana	Gayatri Jayaraman, Naveen Mayur, Ananth Nag	Vijaya Bhaskar	
Neelambari	Surya	Ramya Krishna, Suman, Prema, Charulatha, Devaraj, Tara	Rajesh Ramanath	
Prema Rajya				
Premakke Sai	A. Kodandarami Reddy	V. Ravichandran, Shaheen Khan, Prakash Raj, Kasthuri	Mani Sharma	Remake of Telugu film Chiru Navvutho; 5 October release
Premi No.1	Kodlu Ramakrishna	Ramesh Aravind, Prema, Srinivasa Murthy, Srinath, Karibasavaiah	Gurukiran	Remake of Tamil film Darling, Darling, Darling; 4 May release
Rashtrageethe	K. V. Raju	Sai Kumar, Vinod Raj, Bhavana, Manjula Sharma, Swarna	Sadhu Kokila	2 March release
Rusthum	Om Sai Prakash	Jaggesh, Abhijeeth, Swathi, Lokesh, Komal Kumar	Sadhu Kokila	19 October release
Satyameva Jayathe	H. Vasu	Devaraj, Archana, Shobaraj, Mukhyamantri Chandru	Gandharva	12 September release
Shaapa	Ashok Patil	B. C. Patil, Ramesh Aravind, Anu Prabhakar, K. S. Ashwath, Jai Jagadish	Hamsalekha	4 May release
Shivappa Nayaka	B. C. Patil	B. C. Patil, Anu Prabhakar, C P Yogeshwar, Jayanthi	Dhina	12 October release
Shukradeshe	Vimal - Kathir	Jaggesh, Srilakshmi, Komal Kumar, Doddanna, Tennis Krishna	Vijay Anand	5 January release
Sri Manjunatha	K. Raghavendra Rao	Arjun Sarja, Soundarya, Chiranjeevi, Meena, Ambareesh, Sumalatha, Vinod Raj, Kumar Govind, Abhijeeth, Sudharani, Dwarakish	Hamsalekha	22 June release
Sundara Kanda	M.S.Rajshekar	Shivarajkumar, Roja, Sujeetha, Ramesh Bhat, Shivaram	M. M. Keeravani	Remake of Tamil film Sundara Kandam; 12 October release
Supari	S. S. David	Charan Raj, Thriller Manju, Shobaraj, Hamsa, Lakshman	Shivamaya	
Usire	A. K. Prabhu	V. Ravichandran, Rachana Banerjee, Prakash Raj, Doddanna, Sadhu Kokila	Ilaiyaraaja	Remake of Tamil film Bharathi Kannamma; 6 April release
Vaalee	S. Mahendar	Sudeep, Poonam Singar, Divyashree, Sadhu Kokila, Bank Janardhan	Rajesh Ramanath	Remake of Tamil film Vaali; 19 October release
Vishalakshmanna Ganda	Raj Kishore	S. Narayan, Anu Prabhakar, Pankaj Narayan, Doddanna	Prashanth Raj	Remake of Tamil film Vaettiya Madichu Kattu; 26 October release
Vande Matharam	Om Prakash Rao	Vijayashanti, Ambareesh, Girish Karnad, Ravi Teja	Deva	
Yarige Beda Duddu	Guruprasad	Abhijeeth, K. Shivaram, Tennis Krishna, Archana, Akhila	M N Krupakar	
Yuvaraja	Puri Jagannadh	Shivarajkumar, Lisa Ray, Bhavna Pani, Kumar Govind, Avinash	Ramana Gogula	Remake of Telugu film Thammudu; 2 November release
