= Tumm Se Tumm Tak =

2025 Indian Hindi-language TV series

- Genre: Romance; Drama
- Created by: Prateek Sharma
- Written by: Dialogues: Amit Babbar
- Screenplay by: Bahnishikha Das
- Story by: Abhijit Guru
- Directed by: Yusuf Farooq Ansari
- Creative director: Avhiroop Mazzumdar
- Starring: Niharika Chouksey; Sharad Kelkar
- Theme music composer: Sunaad Gowtham
- Opening theme: "Tumm Se Tumm Tak" by Palak Muchhal & Javed Ali
- Composer: Nishant Pandey
- Country of origin: India
- Original language: Hindi
- No. of episodes: 483

Production
- Producers: Prateek Sharma; Parth Shah
- Production location: Delhi
- Cinematography: Suhas Rao
- Editor: Ashish Singh
- Camera setup: Multi-camera
- Running time: 22 minutes
- Production company: Studio LSD Private Limited

Original release
- Network: Zee TV
- Release: 7 July 2025 – present

Related
- Tula Pahate Re

Tumm Se Tumm Tak (transl. From You To You) is an Indian Hindi-language romantic drama television series that premiered on 7 July 2025 on Zee TV and streams digitally on ZEE5. Produced by Prateek Sharma under the banner of Studio LSD Private Limited, the series stars Niharika Chouksey and Sharad Kelkar in the lead roles. It is an official remake of the Marathi TV series Tula Pahate Re of Zee Marathi.

== Plot ==
Tumm Se Tumm Tak follows Anu Sharma, a 20-year-old middle-class girl from Chandni Chowk, Delhi, and Aryavardhan "Arya", a 46-year-old successful industrialist heading the Vardhan Group of Industries. Anu's father works at a local store that sells Rajnandini Sarees, a brand owned by Arya's company.

Their lives intersect, when Arya's bicycle breaks down on the way to the Annual Function of K.C. College, where he is the chief guest and Anu is invited to give a speech. Sharing an auto-rickshaw unknowingly, Anu is initially unaware of Arya's identity. Despite an awkward first meeting and a public mishap, during her speech, Arya is impressed, by Anu's sincerity and offers her a job at his company.

As their relationship develops, Anu is pushed toward an arranged marriage with Bipin, orchestrated by the manipulative Raghu, who seeks personal gain. Arya quietly works behind the scenes to stop the marriage, by uncovering Raghu's hidden motives and exposing him using a new company policy that, reveals Raghu's conflict of interest.

Anu and Arya navigate challenges posed, by their differing social backgrounds and the opposition they face from Arya's confidant Jhende and Arya's assistant, Meera.

== Cast ==
=== Main ===
- Niharika Chouksey as Anu Sharma Vardhan: Gopal and Pushpa's daughter; Arya's second wife (2025–present)
- Sharad Kelkar as Arya Vardhan (née Rajeev Bhatia): Gayatri's step son; Yash and Harsh's half brother; Rajnandini's widower; Anu's husband (2025–present)
- Anita Hassanandani as Rajnandini Vardhan: Arya's first wife (2026–present)

=== Recurring ===
- Vandana Pathak as Gayatri Devi Vardhan: Yash and Harsh's mother; Arya's stepmother (2025–present)
- Angad Hasija as Yash Vardhan: Gayatri's estranged elder lost son; Harsh's brother; Arya's half brother; Meera's husband (2026–present)
- Dolly Chawla as Meera Mehta Vardhan: Arya's personal assistant and one sided lover; Yash's wife (2025–present)
- Manraj Singh as Harsh Vardhan: Gayatri's younger son; Yash's brother; Arya's half brother; Manasi's husband (2025–present)
- Nandani Tiwary as Manasi Vardhan: Neel's sister; Harsh's wife (2025–present)
- Sameer Patil as Gopal Sharma: Pushpa's husband; Anu's father (2025–present)
- Soma Rathod as Pushpa Sharma: Gopal's wife; Anu's mother (2025–present)
- Nasir Khan as Keshav Jhende: Arya's close friend and trusted confidant (2025–present)
- Anupam K. Sinha as Akhil Bharadwaj: Arya's oldest employee (2025–present)
- Palash Modi as Mayur: Arya's employee (2025–present)
- Utkarsha Naik as Siddhi Mata (2025–present)
- Priyal Gupta as Neel: Manasi's brother; Simran's husband (2025–present)
- Saarvie Omana as Simran: Rajani's daughter; Anu's close friend; Neel's wife (2025–present)
- Poonam Jangra as Rajani: Simran's mother; a neighbour of the Sharma family (2025–present)
- Sanjay Deo as Raghupati: Rajani's brother; Bipin's father (2025–present)
- Rahul Bajaj as Bipin: Raghupati's son; Anu's friend (2025–present)
- Rajkumar Kanojia as Rickshaw driver (2025–present)
- Sai Ballal as Jalandhar (2025–2026)
- Ajay Raju as Raam: A servant of Arya (2025–present)
- Nikhhil Raaj Khera as Prakash: Dr. Mohit's father (2026)
- Sheetal Antani as Dr Mohit's mother (2026)
- Ravjeet Singh as Dr. Mohit: A cardiologist; Prakash's son (2026)
- Kaushal Kapoor as Rajnandini's father (2026–present)
- Ishaan Kesarwani as Guddu (2026–present)
- Yashika Sharma as Neetu (2025–present)
- Sharmila Dey as Prabha (2025–present)

== Production ==
=== Casting ===
Helly Shah and Karan Singh Grover was first approached for the lead role but was replaced by Niharika Chouksey and Sharad Kelkar. The series marks Kelkar's television comeback after eight years. Vandana Pathak joined the cast, marking her television comeback after 5 year. Soma Rathod joined the cast as Pushpa. In August 2025, Dolly Chawla entered the show to play Meera. In January 2025, Ravjeet Singh was cast as Dr. Mohit. In February 2025, Nikhil Raaj Khera joined the show as Dr. Mohit's father. In May 2026, Anita Hassanandani was cast as Rajnandini. In the same month, Angad Hasija joined the cast as Yashvardhan.

=== Filming ===
The series is primarily shot in Delhi, particularly in and around Chandni Chowk, to authentically depict Anu Sharma’s middle-class background. Iconic Delhi landmarks such as India Gate and Qutub Minar also feature in the show’s outdoor scenes. Corporate and mansion scenes are filmed in studios in Mumbai to represent Aryavardhan’s affluent world.

=== Music ===
The show's title track is called "Tumm Se Tumm Tak". The lyrics are penned by Amit Deep Sharma, and the original composition is by Sunaad Gowtham. The track is primarily sung by vocalists Javed Ali and Palak Muchhal, with additional vocals by Nishant Pandey and Senjuti Das.

=== Controversy ===
The series was reported to the Bombay High Court due to the huge age difference between the lead actors, and the Bombay High Court replied "If you don't like it, don't watch it."

== Adaptations ==
Language	Title	Original release	Network(s)	Last aired	Notes
Marathi	Tula Pahate Re तुला पाहते रे	13 August 2018	Zee Marathi	20 July 2019	Original
Kannada	Jothe Jotheyali ಜೊತೆ ಜೊತೆಯಲಿ	9 September 2019	Zee Kannada	19 May 2023	Remake
Telugu	Prema Entha Madhuram ప్రేమ ఎంత మధురం	10 February 2020	Zee Telugu	5 July 2025	Remake
Malayalam	Neeyum Njanum നീയും ഞാനും	10 February 2020	Zee Keralam	8 April 2023	Remake
Tamil	Neethane Enthan Ponvasantham நீதானே எந்தன் பொன்வசந்தம்	24 February 2020	Zee Tamil	25 December 2021	Remake
Punjabi	Akhiyan Udeek Diyan ਅੱਖੀਆਂ ਉਡੀਕ ਦੀਆਂ	22 March 2021	Zee Punjabi	27 August 2021	Remake
Bengali	Chirodini Tumi Je Amar চিরদিনই তুমি যে আমার	10 March 2025	Zee Bangla	1 June 2026	Remake
Hindi	Tumm Se Tumm Tak तुम से तुम तक	7 July 2025	Zee TV	Ongoing	Remake

== Reception ==
=== Ratings ===
Week	Year	BARC Viewership		Ref.
Week	Year	TRP	Ranking	Ref.
Week 4	2026	1.9	4	
Week 5	2026	1.9	5	
Week 18	2026	1.5	4	
Week 19	2026	1.6	4	
Week 20	2026	1.6	3	
Week 21	2026	1.8	2	
Week 22	2026	1.8	2	
Week 23	2026	1.8	2	
Week 24	2026	1.7	3	

== Awards and nominations ==
Year	Award	Category	Recipient	Result	Ref.
2026	Indian Television Academy Awards	Best Serial - Drama - TV	Tumm Se Tumm Tak	Pending	
2026	Indian Television Academy Awards	Best Actor - Drama - TV	Sharad Kelkar	Pending	
2026	Indian Television Academy Awards	Best Actress - Drama - TV	Niharika Choksey	Pending	
2026	Indian Television Academy Awards	Best Director - Drama - TV	Yusuf Ansari	Pending	
2026	Indian Television Academy Awards	Best Art Director - TV	Akhil Raut	Pending	
2026	Indian Television Academy Awards	Best Costume Designer - TV	Nisha Bedi	Pending	
2026	Indian Television Academy Awards	Best Dialogue - Drama - TV	Amit Babbar	Pending	
2026	Indian Television Academy Awards	Best DOP - TV	Suhas Rao	Pending	
2026	Indian Television Academy Awards	Best Editor - TV	Ashish Singh	Pending	
2026	Indian Television Academy Awards	Best Music Composer - TV	Nishant Pandey	Pending	
2026	Indian Television Academy Awards	Best Story - TV	Abhiijit Guru	Pending	
2026	Indian Television Academy Awards	Best Teleplay - TV	Bahnishikha Das	Pending	
