= Neeyum Njanum (TV series) =

Indian television series

- Genre: Soap opera Romance
- Developed by: Abhijit Guru; Shekhar Dhavalikar; Sharvari Patankar
- Written by: Sujesh
- Directed by: Dr. S Janardhanan
- Starring: Shiju Abdul Rasheed; Susmitha Prabhakaran
- Opening theme: Neeyum Njanum Ethu Janmanilavil
- Composers: Sunaad Gowtham (Music); B.K.Harinarayanan (Lyrics)
- Country of origin: India
- Original language: Malayalam
- No. of episodes: 876

Production
- Executive producer: Shaji Nuranaadu
- Production locations: Thiruvananthapuram, Kerala, India
- Cinematography: S Loval
- Editor: Jijo George
- Camera setup: Multi-camera
- Running time: 22 minutes
- Production company: Bhoomichithra

Original release
- Network: Zee Keralam
- Release: 10 February 2020 – 8 April 2023

Related
- Tula Pahate Re

Neeyum Njanum (transl. You and Me) is an Indian Malayalam-language television series which premiered from 10 February 2020 on Zee Keralam. South Indian actor Shiju plays the lead protagonist alongside debutante Susmitha Prabhakaran. The series is an official remake of Zee Marathi series Tula Pahate Re.

== Plot ==
The story started with a famous 45 year old businessman Ravi Chandra Varman (Shiju Abdul Rasheed), the MD of Varman group and Sree Lakshmi a 23 years old college student (Susmitha Prabhakaran) who is kind hearted by nature. One day in Sree Lakshmi's college function Ravi Varman was invited as the chief guest. Sree Lakshmi was the announcer of the function. Sree Lakshmi goes to the college by an auto, Ravi Varman avoid his luxury car and goes on a cycle. Ravi's cycle was broken and Sree and Ravi travel in the same autorickshaw. Ravi likes Sree Lakshmi's attitude which attracts him towards Sree. Ravi Varman announced Sree as the staff in Varman group which is not liked by the Vice president of Varman group Sandra (Sree Lakshmi's senior) (Lekshmy Nandan) as she have an affection towards Ravivarman and due to the reason that Sree works efficiently than Sandra which impresses Ravivarman. Slowly Ravi and Sree get close. Ravi have a special interest towards Sree. This is not supported by Rajaram, his best friend (also PA of Ravi Varman) because he felt that their age gap might be a problem between their relationship. Due to this, Ravi acts strict towards Sree which initially surprises Sree. Later Sree Lakshmi becomes the senior of Rajanandhini fabrics. Slowly Raja Ram supports their crush but unfortunately her parents fix her marriage with the neighbour's son which she reluctantly agrees. Ravivarman goes to help Sree's family for the wedding with the intention of meeting Sree Lakshmi. The marriage gets called off due to rivalry between neighbour and Sree's father. Their bond gets closer which creates a ruckus in the office by Sandra. By convincing her parents and his parents, they get married. Sree asks about Rajanandini but Ravi ignores it leading to her getting doubts. Sree gets possessed by a ghost in the midnight who introduced herself as Rajanandini (Kalyani Nair), the deceased wife of Ravivarman. She reveals that she was not dead by an accident but killed by Ravivarman who wanted to take possession on Rajanandini's business enterprise. She also reveals that Sree is none other than Rajanandini's rebirth whose aim is to kill Ravivarman.

== Cast ==
=== Main ===
- Shiju Abdul Rasheed as Ravichandra Varman (Sanjay)
  - (M.D of Varman group, son of Gayatridevi, brother of Raghuchandra Varman, and Sreelakshmi's husband)
  - (Daughter of Sarojamma and Sudarshan, Krishna's friend, and Ravi Varman's wife
  - Bold and self centred girl from a village, younger sister or Devi

=== Recurring ===
- Kalyani Nair as Rajanandhini
  - (Ravi Varman's first wife, Gayatridevi's daughter. Reghu Varman's elder sister and ex MD of Varman group)
- Lekshmy Nandan as Sandra
  - (Varman group's vice president, Ravichandra Varman's PA and wishes to marry him.)
- Remya Sudha as Sarojamma
  - (Sree Lakshmi's mother, Sudharshan's wife)
- James as Sudarsan
  - (Sreelakshmi's father and Sarojamma's husband)
- Abees Saif as Raja Ram
  - (PA of Varman Group and Ravichandra Varman's best friend)
- Nisthar Sait as Gowri Das/GD
  - (Rajanandhini's old business partner and Ravi Varman's enemy)
- Athira Praveen as Krishna
  - (Puppy's daughter, Sreelakshmi's best friend)
- Manka Mahesh/ Shobha Mohan as Gayatri Devi
  - (Wife of late.Raja Raja Varma, mother of Ravichandra and Reghuchandra Varmanand sreelakshmi, Rekha's mother in law)
- Kiran Iyer as Raghuchandra Varman
  - (Younger brother of Ravichandra, son of Gayathri Devi and husband of Rekha)
- Pratheeksha G Pradeep as Rekha
  - (Reghuchandra Varman's wife, Ravichandravarman's sister in law, and Gayatridevi's daughter in law)
- Rafeek Razak as gopi
  - (Ravichandra Varman's house staff)
- Nikitha Murali as Neethu.
- Akhil Chithrangathan as Deepu Sandeep
  - (Trivikraman's son, Krishna's cousin and Sree Lekshmi's friend)
- Sopna Mohan as Padmini/Puppy.
  - sarojamma's friend and neighbor, krishna's mother, Trivikaman's sister
- Suresh Nair as Trivikraman
  - Padmini's brother, Deepu's father and Krishna's uncle.
- Gopika as Maya

(Sarojamma's elder sister's daughter, and Sree Lakshmi's cousin)

- Raji Menon as Sree Lakshmi

(Sachi's mother and rtd Mathematics teacher)

- Akash Murali as Sachidananthan/Sachi
  - Sreelakshmi's ex-fiancée
- Anand as Rahul
  - (Office Staff)
- Jayaram Kalakkodu as Najeeb
  - (Attender)
- Sayana Krishna as Ragasudha
  - ( Daughter of neelambari and Raja Raja Varma, step sister or Ravi and Raghu)

Kezia Joseph as Devi

  - Blind sister of Kannamma
- Nandhan Senanipuram as prasad (kochu thirumeni)

=== Guest appearance ===
- Divya Unni
- Prabhin
- Mersheena Neenu
- Vaishnavi Saikumar
- Sharan Puthumana
- Mariya Prince

== Adaptations ==
Language	Title	Original release	Network(s)	Last aired	Notes
Marathi	Tula Pahate Re तुला पाहते रे	13 August 2018	Zee Marathi	20 July 2019	Original
Kannada	Jothe Jotheyali ಜೊತೆ ಜೊತೆಯಲಿ	9 September 2019	Zee Kannada	19 May 2023	Remake
Telugu	Prema Entha Madhuram ప్రేమ ఎంత మధురం	10 February 2020	Zee Telugu	5 July 2025	Remake
Malayalam	Neeyum Njanum നീയും ഞാനും	10 February 2020	Zee Keralam	8 April 2023	Remake
Tamil	Neethane Enthan Ponvasantham நீதானே எந்தன் பொன்வசந்தம்	24 February 2020	Zee Tamil	25 December 2021	Remake
Punjabi	Akhiyan Udeek Diyan ਅੱਖੀਆਂ ਉਡੀਕ ਦੀਆਂ	22 March 2021	Zee Punjabi	27 August 2021	Remake
Hindi	Tumm Se Tumm Tak तुम से तुम तक	7 July 2025	Zee TV	Ongoing	Remake
