= Prema Entha Madhuram =

Telugu drama series

- Genre: Drama; Romance
- Developed by: Sriram Venkat
- Screenplay by: Praja Prabhakar; Poluru Krishna
- Directed by: Sai Venkat; Rajinikanth Y; Suresh Jonnala; Rameshwar Goriparthi
- Creative director: Sai Venkat
- Starring: Sriram Venkat; Varsha HK; Kalyan; Divya; Ram Jagan
- Narrated by: Sravani Rayachothi
- Music by: Sunadh Gowtham
- Opening theme: by Veyi Janmalaina
- Country of origin: India
- Original language: Telugu
- No. of seasons: 1
- No. of episodes: 1601

Production
- Producer: Sriram Venkat
- Production locations: Hyderabad, Telangana
- Camera setup: Multi-camera
- Running time: 20-21 minutes
- Production company: South Indian Screens

Original release
- Network: Zee Telugu
- Release: 10 February 2020 – 5 July 2025

Related
- Tula Pahate Re; Jothe Jotheyali

Prema Entha Madhuram is an Indian Telugu language Drama romantic television series Premiered on 10 February 2020 on Zee Telugu. It is an official remake of Marathi TV series Tula Pahate Re. One of the longest running Telugu television soap opera, the series starred Sriram Venkat, Varsha HK, Kalyan Reddy, Divya and Ramjagan in pivotal roles. After a successful five and a half year run, it went off air in July 2025.

== Plot ==
The love story revolves around a middle-aged businessman and a 20-year-old girl. Life brings them together. However, there's a hidden past and mystery behind their love story.

Anuradha Paddula is a 20-year-old, easy-going, and ambitious young woman who lives with her parents, Subramanyam and Paddula Padmavathi. Arya Vardhan, a dynamic 40-year-old business magnate, leads a successful yet lonely life following the death of his wife, Rajanandhini, two decades ago. Fate brings Anu and Arya together during an auto-rickshaw ride, where Arya is struck by Anu's unique “two-rupee coin” philosophy. Inspired by her perspective, he applies her idea to his business and offers her a job. Moved by Arya's kindness and philanthropic ideals, Anu gradually develops admiration for him, eventually realizing she has fallen in love, disregarding their age and societal differences. Arya, too, begins to reciprocate Anu's feelings but hesitates to express them. After overcoming numerous challenges, Arya finally confesses his love, and the two get married, uniting against all odds.

Soon after their wedding, on a powerful Ashtami night, Anu receives a shocking revelation from the spirit of Rajanandhini—she is her reincarnation. The spirit urges Anu to uncover the truth behind her murder and protect Arya from looming dangers. Determined, Anu secretly investigates the history of Vardhan Group of Industries and discovers a woman named Raga Sudha, the former Vice President of VGI, who now lives in hiding under the alias Sudha Rajput. Seeking revenge on Arya, Raga Sudha infiltrates VGI, unaware that Anu has befriended her. Eventually, it is revealed that Raga Sudha, Rajanandhini's own sister, killed her out of greed for Arya and his wealth. Anu and Arya expose her true identity in court, leading to her arrest. To celebrate their triumph, the couple plans a trip to Malaysia but is rerouted to Rajahmundry due to a flight issue. Tragedy strikes on their return journey when their flight crashes: Arya is rescued, but Anu is presumed dead.

Months later, Raaji, a woman identical to Anu, enters the scene, and Arya brings her to the Vardhan house for the sake of his bedridden father-in-law, Subbu, who longs to see his daughter. It is soon revealed that Raaji is actually Anu in disguise, part of her plan to uncover Raga Sudha's next move and protect her family. On their wedding anniversary, Arya discloses Raaji's true identity to the family, and the couple reunites. During this time, they rescue a woman named Raani, who looks exactly like Rajanandhini, only to discover she is Meera: Arya's former one-sided lover and the current Vice President of VGI—suffering from memory loss after an accident orchestrated by Jalandhar's men. Jalandhar had planned to turn Meera into Rajanandhini through plastic surgery, but even after regaining her memory, Meera continues to pose as Raani, conspiring with Mansi to marry Arya. Their scheme is ultimately exposed in court when Anu reveals she is the reincarnation of Rajanandhini, leading to the arrest of both Meera and Raga Sudha. Meanwhile, Mansi continues to manipulate the family, turning them against Anu, particularly Neeraj: by falsely claiming Anu caused her infertility. Amidst the chaos, Anu becomes pregnant, and a drunken Neeraj disrupts her baby shower, prompting Anu and Arya to leave the Vardhan Empire, with Arya handing over control of the company to Neeraj. Arya assumes a new identity as Anand and works as a daily wage laborer under Anjali's supervision, who is impressed by his intelligence and begins to fall for him. Anu, disguised as Aparna, works as a maid in Anjali's house until Anjali uncovers their true identities and chooses to marry Neeraj, now disillusioned with Mansi, to help reunite the family. Anu and Arya return to the Vardhan house, and as Anu's delivery nears, she is rushed to the hospital where Jalandhar, disguised as a doctor, attempts to harm her but is stopped by Arya and Jhende. In the chaos, Arya is injured during the fight, and Anu mysteriously disappears from the hospital with her newborn twins. It is later revealed that Mansi, with the help of an imposter, manipulated Anu into believing that Arya's life would be in danger if he stayed with his children.

Four years later, Anu is living independently as a single mother to her twins, Abhay and Aakanksha, who frequently ask about their father, unaware of his identity. During a school competition where Arya is invited as the chief guest, Akki forms a close bond with him, while Abhay remains distant. As their connection deepens, the twins make Arya promise to help them find their father. Meanwhile, Arya and the VGI team work to bring back wrongly imprisoned individuals from Saudi Arabia, including Surya, who later sacrifices his life to save Arya from an assassination attempt orchestrated by Mansi. Honoring Surya's dying wish, Arya disguises himself as Surya and visits Surya's mother, Suguna, who has also bonded with Anu, now visiting under the alias Radha. As Suguna observes the growing affection between Radha and Surya, she decides to get them married, unaware of their true identities. While Anu knows Surya is Arya, Arya remains unaware that Radha is Anu. On the day of their wedding, Arya uncovers the truth, reunites with Anu, and exposes Mansi's conspiracy. Anu and the twins return to the Vardhan house, much to Sharadha Devi's joy. However, a new conflict arises when a girl named Anandhi enters, claiming Arya as her father and causing turmoil within the family. It is later revealed that Anandhi is the daughter of Meera and Ajay, sent to exact revenge. Ajay, Arya's stepbrother and Sharadha Devi's biological son, brings Meera into the Vardhan house, and the two continue to create problems for Anu and Arya. To mend the fractured relationships, Arya takes the family to their ancestral village, Ayodhyapuram. The village head's daughter Bhanu begins to fall for Arya as he saves her from a danger. However it's revealed that Bhanu is just pretending to love him only to convince her father to marry the person whom she actually loves. Arya's efforts succeed in reuniting everyone, only for tragedy to strike when Jalandhar fatally shoots Anu. In his grief, Arya dies as well, proving that their love was so deep they remained inseparable even in death.

Twenty-five years later, Anu and Arya are reborn as Gowri and Shankar, with no memories of their past lives. Fate brings them together when they, along with their respective siblings, begin living in the same rented house: Gowri and her sisters on the ground floor, and Shankar and his brothers upstairs. Working as event managers, Gowri and Shankar frequently clash over trivial matters, leading to humorous situations. One day, Yadagiri, a former VGI employee, sees them and immediately recognizes them as the reincarnated Anu and Arya. Overjoyed, he informs his wife Jyothi (Suguna's elder daughter and Arya's sister) and Jhende, who also sees Gowri and Shankar at a temple and becomes convinced of their rebirth. Meanwhile, Abhay and Aakanksha return from Australia after completing their PhDs and hire Gowri and Shankar as event managers for their welcome party, though they fail to recognize them as their parents. Around this time, Rakesh, Jalandhar's son, infiltrates the family by posing as Abhay's close friend, plotting revenge. As Gowri, Shankar, Jhende, and Yadagiri grow closer, Akki organizes a couple's contest and spots her parents, while Abhay becomes emotional upon seeing them during Diwali. On Yadagiri's insistence, Jhende asks Gowri and Shankar to move into the Vardhan house to protect Abhay and Akki from Rakesh. They are soon appointed as chairman and Vice Chairperson of VGI, shocking the staff with their resemblance to Anu and Arya. Gowri eventually regains her memories and realizes she is Anuradha Vardhan, though Shankar remains unaware of his identity. As the story unfolds, Abhay arranges Akki's wedding to Rakesh, but Shankar exposes Rakesh's evil intentions on the wedding day and instead gets Akki married to Ravi, Yadagiri and Jyothi's son. Trouble brews again when Maya, Jalandhar's daughter and Rakesh's sister, enters the Vardhan house, pretending to love Abhay, who genuinely falls for her. Unknown to them, Ravi is secretly working for Maya and Rakesh, having only married Akki to help execute their plans. However, Akki's love softens Ravi, leading to his transformation, while Maya, too, begins to change upon recognizing Abhay's genuine affection. Despite their change of heart, Rakesh orchestrates a snake attack on Arya, leaving him critically injured. Anu performs rigorous rituals for his recovery, and when hope seems lost, Dr. Varshini, whom Arya once helped with her education, saves him, fulfilling her promise. It is later revealed that Maya attempted to sabotage Arya's rescue on Rakesh's orders by tampering with the car. Upon discovering this, Abhay severs ties with Maya, but she sincerely repents, and with Anu and Arya's intervention, Abhay forgives her. Shankar's brothers marry Gowri's sisters. Anu and Arya's wedding is followed by their marriage completing the circle of destiny. They then get Abhay and Maya married to each other. Arya exposes Sharma's (Jalandhar's uncle) manipulative deeds against Rakesh. This revelation makes Rakesh to realise his actions and sincerely repents leading to his transformation. Sharma is then arrested for his evil actions. The saga finally ends with a family photo on a happy note.

== Cast ==
=== Main ===
- Sriram Venkat as Arya Vardhan (Dead) / Anand / Surya / Shankar (Reincarnation of Arya); Founder and Chairman of Vardhan Group of Industries (VGI); Surya Vardhan's son; Sharada Devi's step-son; Rajanandhini's widower; Anu's husband; Aakanksha and Abhay's father (2020–25)
- HK Varsha as Anuradha "Anu" Paddula Vardhan / Aparna / Raji / Shaila Bhanu / Radha / Gowri (Reincarnation of Anu); Paddula Padmavathi and Subramanyam Paddula's daughter; CEO of Nandhini Textiles; Vice-chairwoman of Vardhan Group of Industries (VGI); Arya's second wife; Abhay and Aakanksha's mother (2020–25)
- Kalyan Reddy as Abhay Vardhan; Arya and Anu's son; Aakanksha and Anandhi's brother; Maya's husband (2024–25)
- Divya as Aakanksha Vardhan; Arya and Anu's daughter; Abhay's younger sister; Ravi's wife (2024–25)
- Ramjagan as Keshav Jhende: Arya's best friend and personal secretary who is taking care of Aakanksha and Abhay after Arya and Anu's demise (2020–25)

=== Recurring ===
- Jabardasth Varsha (2020–21), Anusha Susarla (2021–22), Mahi Maheshwari (2022–2024) as Mansi Vardhan: Neeraj's ex-wife; Head of Food Corporation of Vardhan Group of Industries.
- Gowri Raj as Raga Sudha / Sudha Rajput: Former Vice-president of Vardhan Group of Industries (VGI); Rajanandhini's murderer (2022–2023)
- Sharif Vikram as Jalandhar: Arya's main enemy; Chhaya Devi's elder brother; Viraj "Rakesh" and Maya's father (2020–2024) (Dead)
- VJ Karam as Niranjan "Neeraj" Vardhan: Arya's younger step-brother; Ajay's biological younger brother; Mansi's ex-husband; Anjali's husband; Managing Director of Vardhan Group of Industries (VGI) - (2020–2024)
- A V N Rajakumari as Sharada Devi Vardhan: Surya Vardhan's second wife and widow; Matriarch of the Vardhans; Arya's stepmother, Neeraj and Ajay's mother; Rajanandhini, Anu, Mansi, Meera and Anjali's mother-in-law; Anandi's grandmother, Abhay and Aakanksha's step-grandmother (2024) - Formerly Jayalalita as Sharadha Devi Vardhan (2020–23)
- Rajeev Ravichandra as Neel: A new employee of VGI who falls in love with Anu and works for Jalandhar as his mole but had a change of heart, and was sent abroad by Arya for his higher studies (2020–21)
- Anushree Raj as Meera Hegde Vardhan: Former Vice-President of Vardhan Group of Industries (VGI) and Arya’s Personal Assistant, who one sidedly loved Arya and wanted to marry him, only to be rejected by him. Fake reincarnation of Rajanandhini. She married Ajay Vardhan to exact revenge on Arya and Anu and take over VGI; Anandhi's mother (2020–22, 2024)
- Child Shadasya Kruti as child Anandhi Vardhan: Meera and Ajay's daughter (2024)
- Manasa Manohar as Rajanandhini / Raani Arya's late wife (2021–23)
- Sandeep as Sampath: Anu's friend (2020–2024)
- Madhusree as Ramya: Anu's friend (2020–22)
- Viswa Mohan as Subramanyam Paddula; Anu's father (2020–2024)
- Bangalore Padma (2020–23) as Paddula Padmavati: Anu's mother, replaced by Prabhavathi (2023–2024)
- Suhan Ghori as Madan: Anjali's elder brother who is obsessed with Anu and her beauty, Arya's enemy who secretly works for Chhaya Devi (2023)
- Surya Teja as Yadagiri: Jyothi's husband; Former site manager of Anjali Group of constructions; Employee at VGI factory (2023–present)
- Priyanka Chowdary as Anjali Vardhan: Owner and Chairperson of Anjali Group of Constructions; Madan's sister; Neeraj's second wife (2023)
- Archana Ananth as Lakshmi: Sharada Devi Vardhan's longtime friend who reveals Ajay's connection to Sharada Devi to him (2024)
- Jyothi Reddy as the Soothsayer "Jogamma" (2020-2024)
- Ayukth Akul as child Abhay Vardhan (2023–24)
- Tejal Vikyathi as child Aakanksha Vardhan (2023–24)
- Sunandha Mala Setti as Chhaya Devi: Jalandhar's sister; Arya's ex-fiancee (2023-2024)
- Siri Sha as Vasundhara: Anjali's mother (2023)
- Sasank as Surya; Suguna's son: Jyothi, Divya and Usha's elder brother (2023)
- Aishwarya Jeevan as Divya: Suguna's daughter; Jyothi's younger sister; Usha's elder sister (2023–2024)
- Aditya Ram as Harish, Divya's ex-lover and ex-fiance who works for Jalandhar and his group, Keerthi's lover, who cheats on her for Divya (2023-2024)
- Ishika Sitar as Usha: Suguna's youngest daughter; Jyothi and Divya's younger sister (2023–24)
- Priyanka Ammu as Jyothi: Yadagiri's wife, Suguna's eldest daughter and the elder sister of Divya and Usha; Surya's younger sister; Ravi's mother (2023-2024); Later replaced by Sahasra Naidu (2024–25)
- Usha Rani as Suguna: Surya, Jyothi, Divya and Usha's mother (2023–24)
- Indana Anitha as Satyamma: Mansi’s cruel jail buddy who treats her like a servant (2023)
- Prathap Singh Shah as Ajay Vardhan: Bhupathi Vardhan's (brother of Surya Vardhan) foster son, Sharada Devi's first son and Surya Vardhan's second son; Arya Vardhan's stepbrother and Niranjan "Neeraj" Vardhan's brother; Meera Hegde's husband who wants to take over Vardhan Group of Industries (VGI) and its assets, Arya's enemy who later reforms and reconciles with Arya; Anandhi's father (2024)
- Subha Sai Venkat as Reshma, Anu’s co-worker and close friend (2023)
- Swetha Prasanth as Bhanu aka Bhanumathi: The daughter of Ayodhyapuram sarpanch Neelakantam, who has a crush on Arya (2024)
- Barbie Ramya as Sandhya: Gowri's youngest sister (2024–25)
- Alankrita Shah as Shravani: Gowri's younger sister (2024–25)
- Roshan Kota as Chinnodu, Shankar's youngest brother; Peddodu's younger brother (2024–25)
- Vinod Chakravarthy Maganti as Peddodu, Shankar's younger brother; Chinnodu's elder brother (2024–25)
- Komma Naveen as Viraj "Rakesh"; Jalandhar's son who wants to destroy the Vardhans just like his father by posing as a close friend of Abhay; Aakanksha's ex-fiance (2024–25)
- Charishma Naidu as the Soothsayer (Jogamma) - (2024–25)
- Sahasra Naidu as Jyothi: Yadagiri's wife, Ravi's mother, Suguna's eldest daughter and the elder sister of Divya and Usha; Surya's younger sister (2024–25)
- Jyothika Yadav as Maya Vardhan: Rakesh's younger sister; Jalandhar's daughter; Abhay's love interest and wife; Anu and Arya's daughter-in-law (2024–25)

== Reception ==
| Week | Year | BARC Viewership | | Ref. |
| Week | Year | TRP | Rank | Ref. |
|---|---|---|---|---|
| Week 8 | 2020 | 5.1 | 5 | |
| Week 10 | 2020 | 6.0 | 5 | |
| Week 25 | 2020 | 4.2 | 5 | |
| Week 32 | 2020 | 6.7 | 4 | |
| Week 8 | 2021 | 6.8 | 5 | |
| Week 9 | 2021 | 6.7 | 5 | |
| Week 10 | 2021 | 6.8 | 5 | |

== Adaptations ==
| Language | Title | Original release | Network(s) | Last aired | Notes |
|---|---|---|---|---|---|
| Marathi | Tula Pahate Re तुला पाहते रे | 13 August 2018 | Zee Marathi | 20 July 2019 | Original |
| Kannada | Jothe Jotheyali ಜೊತೆ ಜೊತೆಯಲಿ | 9 September 2019 | Zee Kannada | 19 May 2023 | Remake |
| Telugu | Prema Entha Madhuram ప్రేమ ఎంత మధురం | 10 February 2020 | Zee Telugu | 5 July 2025 | Remake |
| Malayalam | Neeyum Njanum നീയും ഞാനും | 10 February 2020 | Zee Keralam | 8 April 2023 | Remake |
| Tamil | Neethane Enthan Ponvasantham நீதானே எந்தன் பொன்வசந்தம் | 24 February 2020 | Zee Tamil | 25 December 2021 | Remake |
| Punjabi | Akhiyan Udeek Diyan ਅੱਖੀਆਂ ਉਡੀਕ ਦੀਆਂ | 22 March 2021 | Zee Punjabi | 27 August 2021 | Remake |
| Hindi | Tumm Se Tumm Tak तुम से तुम तक | 7 July 2025 | Zee TV | Ongoing | Remake |
