= Neethane Enthan Ponvasantham =

Indian Tamil-language television soap opera

- Genre: Soap opera
- Based on: Tula Pahate Re
- Screenplay by: Haran Prasanna
- Directed by: Muthukumaraswamy
- Creative director: Dinesh
- Starring: Jai Akash; Dharshana Ashokan
- Theme music composer: Vishal Chandrasekhar
- Opening theme: "Neethane"
- Composer: J. V.
- Country of origin: India
- Original language: Tamil
- No. of episodes: 509

Production
- Executive producer: Nivashini Divya
- Producer: Xavier Britto
- Cinematography: V. Sams Williyappan
- Editor: M. D. Prabakaran
- Camera setup: Multi-camera
- Running time: 22 minutes
- Production company: Esthell Entertainers

Original release
- Network: Zee Tamil
- Release: 24 February 2020 – 25 December 2021

Neethane Enthan Ponvasantham (transl. You are my golden springtime) is an Indian Tamil language soap opera aired on Zee Tamil which premiered from 24 February 2020. The TV series stars with Jai Akash and Dharshana Ashokan. This series is an official remake of the Marathi television series, Tula Pahate Re. The story is about a middle-aged business tycoon, Suryaprakash "Surya" falls in love with a young middle-class woman, Anu.

== Synopsis ==
Anu, a simple, middle-class girl meets Surya, a rich business man in an auto rickshaw and they both share the ride. Anu prepares a speech for Surya for her college cultural function, unknown that Surya himself was sitting next to her. At college cultural function, Anu is surprised to know that he's Surya and delivers her speech about him. Thus they both understand each other and become friends. As Anu searches for a job, Surya tells Anu to join as an employee in his company. But Surya's PA, Meera hates Anu because of Surya and Anu's relationship. So she decides to take Anu off the job.

Eventually, Anu and Surya fall in love with each other but haven't confessed to each other. Anu's friend Ramya, encourages her to confess her feelings. Meanwhile, Surya's secretary and best friend Pankaj, tells Surya to forget about Anu as her life would spoil due to their massive age difference. So Surya decides to maintain distance with Anu and acts strict with her. Anu didn't expect this kind of attitude from Surya.

Later, Anu's parents decide to fix a marriage for her, so they fixed their neighbour Raghupathy's son Sampath as Anu's fiancée. But Anu accepts this marriage reluctantly with no interest. Later Surya knows about this and he decides to take care of Anu's marriage and he stays in Anu's house till evening, so Surya tells to Pankaj to cancel the meeting. Then, as the wedding preparations continue, Surya learns the truth of Raghupathy's family, that if Anu becomes their daughter-in-law then they will gain Surya's support and also Anu's father textile shop will be come to their hands. In past Anu's father Subbu was in debt, so he mortgaged the textile shop to another person, who was Raghupathy's partner. Now Surya tells everything to Anu's mother Pushpa and she stops the marriage. Finally Anu becomes happy and her parents thank Surya.

Again Anu joins the office. Meera teases Anu for her marriage issue and she plans for Anu to be scolded by the businessmen. So Meera tells Anu to take the initiative in the meeting. As Anu has no experience and is nervous. Meera told Anu to collect the information of Deva Nandini Sarees, so Anu asks Surya who Deva Nandini is, but he refuses to answer. As days pass, Surya deliberately transfers Anu to Bangalore, so has Surya said, Anu also accepts knowingly. Then, Surya changes his mind and goes to stop Anu, while traveling by bus to Bangalore. Anu is surprised and they both clear their misunderstandings. So Surya decided to travel with Anu and they share a hotel room. Thinking Anu is asleep, Surya confesses his love to her, saying "I love you, Anu". But Anu heard, and then dances while Surya sleeps.

After few days, Surya started accepting the Anu love and they both started the love . In the meantime anu got caught by his mother about her love with surya, in the other part surya mother also found that anu and surya loving each other. Surya was about to go to london to expand his IT Company known as Prakash Infotech. that's when all hell broke loose and a man named Surendhar gets released from prison after 20 years and vows to kill SuryaPrakash. Surendhar hires Neil a young and innocent law student to work for him in works to destroy Prakash Group of Companies. Surendhar's plan fails as Pankaj captures Neil and he confesses the truth, Surya forgives Neil stating that he is innocent and then Pankaj tries capturing Surendhar by hiring assassins to kill him by sketching an accident but Surendhar escapes somehow. after sometime things seemed to go normal and then the marriage of Surya and Anu took place. Surendhar comes back with a bang into the series with an even powerful idea on how to destroy his former business partner, this time he comes in disguise as Thangavel a real estate company owner, Surya finds this out and bashes Surendhar leaving him wounded, Surendhar pleads to Surya and ask's him to kill him off but Surya did not

== Cast ==
=== Main ===
- Jai Akash as Surya Prakash "Surya" : A rich 40-year-old businessman, ex- husband of late Deva Nandhini, but falls in love with Anu and married her. He is the head of "Prakash group of companies". He is Sharadha's first son and Chandraprakash's elder brother.
- Dharshana Ashokan as Anu Suryaprakash: A 20-year-old middle-class girl, an employee in Suryaprakash's company and became his love interest also falls in love with him and turned his wife. She was Subbu and Pushpa's daughter

=== Recurring ===
- David Solomon Raja → Shravan Dwaraganath as Pankaj: Suryaprakash's secretary and best friend
- Nivashini Divya as Meera: Suryaprakash's PA and Vice President of "Prakash group of companies" and one-sidedly loves Surya
- Sonia as Pushpa: Anu's mother and Subbu's wife
- Sairam as Subramaniam "Subbu": Anu's father and Pushpa's husband
- Sathyapriya as Sharadha: Suryaprakash and Chandraprakash's mother, Mansi's mother-in-law
- Nikitha Murali as Neethu
- Karthik Sasidharan as Chandraprakash: Suryaprakash's younger brother, Mansi's husband and Sharadha's second son
- Subiksha Kayarohanam as Mansi: Chandraprakash's wife, Suryaprakash's sister-in-law and Sharadha's second daughter-in-law
- Rishmitha as Ramya: Anu's friend, Ranjini's daughter and Sampath's cousin
- Pavithra as Swapna: An employee in Suryaprakash's office
- Raja Vetri Prabhu as Dheena: An employee in Suryaprakash's office
- KPY Sarath as Gopi: A cook and Mansi's assistant
- Karpagavalli as Ranjini: Anu's neighbour and Ramya's mother
- Raj Mithran as Raghupathy: Ranjini's brother and Sampath's father
- Ravivarman as Alagiya Sampath "Sampath" : Anu's ex-fiancé, Ramya's cousin and Raghupathy's son
- Vetrivelan as Surendhar: Suryaprakash's enemy and former business partner of Surya. One of the owner of Prakash Group of Companies
- Hensha Deepan as Poorni: A nurse and Pushpa's younger sister
- Vimal Venkatesan as Anirudh: Anu's fiancée and Anu's son
- Sheela as Anu: Anirudh's mother

=== Cameo ===
- Jay Srinivas Kumar as Neel: An office employee and Surendhar's partner
- Vimal Venkatesan as Anirudh: Anu's ex-fiancé
- Sheela as Anu: Anirudh's mother
- Subalakshmi Rangan as Deva Nandhini: Suryaprakash's first wife
- Sridevi Ashok
- Reshma Pasupuleti
- Swathi Royal

== Production ==
=== Casting ===
Jai Akash and debutante Dharshana, a doctor, play the lead roles in the television series. The series marks the television debut for Akash and Dharshana. Akash, who is busy shooting for films, has allotted 15 days every month for the series.

=== Broadcast ===
On 27 March 2020, due to COVID-19 pandemic, the series' broadcast ended. Months later, after permitting the serial shootings in India, from 27 July 2020, it resumed the broadcast with new episodes.

=== Music ===
The series' songs were written and composed by Vishal Chandrasekhar.

Track list
No.	Title	Music	Length
1.	"Neethane En Ponvasantham" (Title song)	Vishal Chandrasekhar	1:10
2.	"Neethane Endrendrum Ponvasanthame"	Vishal Chandrasekhar; J.V.	2:33

=== Crossover and Special episodes ===
- Neethane Enthan Ponvasantham cast and crew joined Maha Sangamam with Suryavamsam from 25 January to 26 February 2021.

== Adaptations ==
Language	Title	Original release	Network(s)	Last aired	Notes
Marathi	Tula Pahate Re तुला पाहते रे	13 August 2018	Zee Marathi	20 July 2019	Original
Kannada	Jothe Jotheyali ಜೊತೆ ಜೊತೆಯಲಿ	9 September 2019	Zee Kannada	19 May 2023	Remake
Telugu	Prema Entha Madhuram ప్రేమ ఎంత మధురం	10 February 2020	Zee Telugu	5 July 2025	Remake
Malayalam	Neeyum Njanum നീയും ഞാനും	10 February 2020	Zee Keralam	8 April 2023	Remake
Tamil	Neethane Enthan Ponvasantham நீதானே எந்தன் பொன்வசந்தம்	24 February 2020	Zee Tamil	25 December 2021	Remake
Punjabi	Akhiyan Udeek Diyan ਅੱਖੀਆਂ ਉਡੀਕ ਦੀਆਂ	22 March 2021	Zee Punjabi	27 August 2021	Remake
Hindi	Tumm Se Tumm Tak तुम से तुम तक	7 July 2025	Zee TV	Ongoing	Remake
