= Sundarnath Suvarna =

Indian film director (1950–2013)

- Born: 7 March 1950; Ballalbagh, Mangalore (Karnataka), India
- Died: 10 December 2013 (aged 62); Bengaluru, India
- Occupations: Cinematographer, producer, film director
- Years active: 1968–2013
- Spouse: Harinakshi
- Children: 3

Sundarnath Suvarna was an Indian cinematographer of the Kannada film industry from the late 1970s. He was a cinematographer for over 150 films in Kannada and Tulu and he also additionally directed and produced some films. His daughters run a studio in memory of their father.

== Career ==
Suvarna worked as a cinematographer on Operation Antha, Anuraga Sangama, Lockup Death, Sri Manjunatha, and Mussanjemaatu as well as other films. He also worked in Tulu films including Bangar Patler (1993) and September 8 (1994), the latter of which features seven cinematographers and was shot in 24 hours. The Karnataka state government honoured him with the Rajyothsava Award.

== Filmography ==
| Year | Film | Notes |
|---|---|---|
| 1978 | Ondu Oorina Kathe | |
| 1978 | Phoenix | |
| 1978 | Sandharbha | |
| 1979 | Daaha | |
| 1979 | Kaadu Kudure | |
| 1979 | Udugore | |
| 1980 | Chitrakoota | |
| 1981 | Mangala Sutra | |
| 1983 | Nammoora Basvi | |
| 1983 | Sanchari | |
| 1984 | Anubhava | |
| 1985 | Thrishula | |
| 1986 | 27 Mavalli Circle | |
| 1987 | Bandha Muktha | |
| 1987 | Thayi | |
| 1987 | Agni Parva | Also director and producer |
| 1987 | Anamika | |
| 1987 | Aarambha | Also director |
| 1988 | Nee Nanna Daiva | Also director |
| 1988 | Mathru Vathsalya | |
| 1989 | Amaanusha | |
| 1990 | Aavesha | |
| 1990 | Kiladi Thatha | Also director |
| 1990 | Prathap | |
| 1990 | Pundara Ganda | |
| 1990 | Tiger Gangu | Also director |
| 1991 | Bombay Dada | |
| 1991 | Central Rowdy | |
| 1991 | Kaliyuga Bheema | |
| 1992 | Mysore Jana | |
| 1993 | Rajakeeya | |
| 1993 | Mahendra Varma | |
| 1993 | Jailer Jagannath | |
| 1993 | Hrudaya Bandhana | |
| 1993 | Golibar | |
| 1993 | Vikram | |
| 1993 | Suryodaya | |
| 1993 | Bangar Patler | Tulu films |
| 1994 | September 8 | Tulu films |
| 1994 | Lockup Death | |
| 1995 | Operation Antha | |
| 1995 | Mr. Vasu | |
| 1995 | Emergency | |
| 1995 | Anuraga Sangama | |
| 1996 | Nirbandha | |
| 1996 | Nammoora Mandara Hoove | |
| 1997 | Thayavva | |
| 1997 | Maduve | |
| 1997 | Halliyadarenu Shiva | Also story writer and producer |
| 1998 | Marikannu Horimyage | |
| 1999 | Patela | |
| 2000 | Swalpa Adjust Madkolli | |
| 2000 | Sulthan | |
| 2000 | Indradhanush | |
| 2000 | Hats Off India | |
| 2001 | Sri Manjunatha | |
| 2001 | Vaalee | |
| 2002 | Chandu | |
| 2002 | Roja | |
| 2003 | Lankesh Pathrike | |
| 2003 | Game For Love | |
| 2003 | Thayi Illada Thabbali | |
| 2003 | Kiccha | |
| 2003 | Palegara | |
| 2003 | Daasa | |
| 2004 | Dharma | |
| 2004 | Gowdru | |
| 2004 | Sardara | |
| 2005 | Udees | |
| 2005 | Gunna | |
| 2006 | Ashoka | |
| 2006 | Chellata | |
| 2006 | Gandugali Kumararama | |
| 2006 | Ravi Shastri | |
| 2007 | Amrutha Vaani | |
| 2007 | Gandana Mane | |
| 2008 | Baba | |
| 2008 | Mussanjemaatu | |
| 2009 | Anjadiru | |
| 2009 | Iniya | |
| 2009 | Vayuputra | |
| 2009 | Kallara Santhe | |
| 2010 | Antharathma | |
| 2010 | Thamassu | |
| 2010 | Mathe Mungaru | |
| 2010 | Chiru | |
| 2011 | Kaanchaana | |
| 2012 | Sri Kshetra Adichunchanagiri | |
| 2013 | Mahanadi | |
