= Jothe Jotheyali (TV series) =

Kannada TV series

- Genre: Soap opera
- Based on: Tula Pahate Re
- Directed by: Arooru Jagadish
- Starring: See below
- Country of origin: India
- Original language: Kannada
- No. of episodes: 953

Production
- Camera setup: Multi-camera
- Running time: 22 minutes

Original release
- Network: Zee Kannada
- Release: 9 September 2019 – 19 May 2023

Jothe Jotheyali is a 2019 Indian Kannada language soap opera. The series aired on Zee Kannada from 9 September 2019. The series is an official remake of the Marathi television series Tula Pahate Re. It stars Aniruddha Jatkar and Megha Shetty.

== Synopsis ==
Aryavardhan, a middle-aged businessman, falls in love with Anu, a young middle-class girl. Their Relation starts with the foundation of trust, however they face a lot of challenges in their relationship due to his age difference. Initially Arya although he loves Anu, does not accept her love because of his age. But when he realizes he cannot live without her, he confesses to her thinking that she is sleeping but she was awake and hears his confession and is on cloud nine. Their story even though not confessed to each other face to face about their love is going on smoothly along with small rifts in between. And finally Aryavardhan decides to profess his love, and shares about his past life with -about his first marriage and his first wife being dead. Anu resents him at first for hiding it but is later convinced by his honesty. He further wants to share about his past life but Anu refuses to listen saying that past is past. Then he finally confesses to her face to face and proposes to her. Next they face the challenge of getting their families accept of their relationship. When finally everyone agrees, Anu refuses to marry him as her trust on him is a little bit shaken as he hid an important truth from her and blames him for not saying the truth before hand itself. She goes in search of his past and realizes what hardships he went through in his childhood and feels guilty about hurting him. She apologies to him. They re-unite and finally get happily married.

However post marriage there are different set of revelations Anu learns about Arya's past life, she is shocked and her trust is broken this time. Arya is unaware of it. His love for her is pure, true and very passionate. The past is 20 years ago, Subash Patil is shown as a poor orphan living with his roommate Jhende in Bangalore. One day, as he is rushing to give an interview, he shares his Auto rickshaw with Rajanandini Vardhan, daughter of rich businessman Rajvardhan and Sharada devi who all live in Rajanandini Vilasa in Bangalore. As the tyre of Rajanandini's car gets punctured, Subash drops her to her destination only to realise that his interview is in the same company. Falling in love with her due to her richness, he fakes a fraud in his company and wins Rajanandini's trust. The two eventually confess their love for each other and get married. After their marriage, Subash begins to live in the Rajanandini Vilasa with Rajnandini for Rajvardhan's wish. However, Rajvardhan gets all the proofs against him and insults him over obtaining his business. In retaliation, Subash unknowingly ends up making him have the wrong medicine, resulting in Rajvardhan's death. He also changes Rajvardhan's post-mortem reports which makes Sharada devi think that she is responsible for Rajvardhan's death. Feeling guilty, she decides to reveal the truth to the police but Subash stops her, saying that she will have to go to jail if she does so. Days later, Rajanandini doubts Subash and fixes a microphone in his office-cabin. She catches Subash and Jhende red-handed as their plan gets recorded in the microphone. Upon receiving this proof, Rajanandini threatens to hand over Subash and Jhende to the police while Sharada devi still does not know the truth. Unknowingly she fell off the cliff and died

== Cast ==
=== Main ===
- Aniruddha Jatkar (2019-2022) as Aryavardhan alias Subash Patil: Rajanandini and Anu's husband, Business Tycoon
  - Harish Raj (2022–2023) as Aryavardhan and Sanju Desai: Sanju died by committing suicide and his face transplanted through plastic surgery to Aryavardhan, who met with an accident and his face drastically damaged
- Megha Shetty as Anu Aryavardhan aka Anu: A 21-year old simple and middle-class girl falls in love with Arya; Pushpa and Subbu's only daughter; Arya's Second wife and Reincarnation of Rajanandini.
- Sonu Gowda as Rajanandini Aryavardhan: Aryavardhan first wife; Owner of Rajanandini fabrics; CEO of Vardhan group of companies; Lovely daughter of Rajvardhan and Sharada devi; Harsha Vardhan's sister.

=== Recurring ===
- BM Venkatesh as Keshav Jhende aka Jhende: Arya's friend; Employee of Vardhan group
- Manasa Manohar as Meera Hegde: A hard working girl who wishes to marry Arya; Vice President of Vardhan group
- Devaiah Kalakanda as Harshavardhan aka Harsha: Arya's brother-in-law; Rajanandini 's younger brother; Mansi's husband; Sharadha's son.
- Shilpa Iyer (2019-2021) / Nayana KM (2021–2023) as Mansi Harshavardhan: A rich and posh woman; Harsha's wife.
- Jai Jagadish as Rajvardhan: Sharadha Devi's husband; Rajanandhini and Harshavardhan's father; Mansi and Aryavardhan's father-in-law.
- Vijayalakshmi Singh as Sharadha Devi: Rajvardhan's wife; Rajanandini and Harsha Vardhan's mother; after Rajvardhan and Rajanandini demise, Mansi and Aryavardhan's mother-in-law.
- Padmaja Rao as Priyadarshini Desai / Bhavani Patil: Aryavardhan and Sanju's mother; Prabhu Desai's wife
- Srinivas Prabhu as Prabhu Desai: Priyadarshini's husband
- Apoorva Shri as Pushpa Sirimane, Anu's mother, Subbu's wife
- Shivajirao Jadhav as Subramanya Sirimane aka Subbu: Anu's father; Pushpa's husband
- Sundarashree as Jogthavva: the occultist who guides Anu and her family
- Pragathi Prabhu as Poorni: Pushpa's sister; Anu's aunt
- Shwetha as Rajini: Ramya's mother; Raghupathi's sister; Sampath's aunt
- Priyadarshini as Ramya: Anu's friend and neighbour; Sampath's cousin
- Sugreev Gowda (2019-2021) / Vilas Rao (2021–2023) as Sampath: Raghupathi's son; Anu's friend; Ramya's cousin
- Kiran Kumar as Raghupathi: Sampath's father; Rajini's brother, Ramya's Uncle
- Pruthvi Ambaar as Neel

=== Guest appearances ===
- Vijay Suriya as Vijay Suriya, Anuradha's son
- Sudharani as Anuradha, Mother of Vijay Suriya

== Reception ==
=== Critics ===
The romantic title track of Jothe Jotheyali song, gone viral on social media platforms. The song has reached 2 crore+ views on Zee Kannada YouTube channel.

=== Ratings ===
On its opening week it was in No. 1 position in overall Kannada series It created a sensation all over Kannada television industry, social media platforms with numerous fan pages. It now maintains a top 5 position in the ratings.

== Adaptations ==
Language	Title	Original release	Network(s)	Last aired	Notes
Marathi	Tula Pahate Re तुला पाहते रे	13 August 2018	Zee Marathi	20 July 2019	Original
Kannada	Jothe Jotheyali ಜೊತೆ ಜೊತೆಯಲಿ	9 September 2019	Zee Kannada	19 May 2023	Remake
Telugu	Prema Entha Madhuram ప్రేమ ఎంత మధురం	10 February 2020	Zee Telugu	5 July 2025	Remake
Malayalam	Neeyum Njanum നീയും ഞാനും	10 February 2020	Zee Keralam	8 April 2023	Remake
Tamil	Neethane Enthan Ponvasantham நீதானே எந்தன் பொன்வசந்தம்	24 February 2020	Zee Tamil	25 December 2021	Remake
Punjabi	Akhiyan Udeek Diyan ਅੱਖੀਆਂ ਉਡੀਕ ਦੀਆਂ	22 March 2021	Zee Punjabi	27 August 2021	Remake
Hindi	Tumm Se Tumm Tak तुम से तुम तक	7 July 2025	Zee TV	Ongoing	Remake

== Awards ==
- Aniruddha Jatkar got best actor award in Zee Kannada Zee Kutumba awards 2020
- Megha Shetty got best actress award (people's choice) in Zee Kannada Zee Kutumba awards 2020
- Aniruddh Jatkar and Megha Shetty got Best Jodi award (Critics) at Zee Kutumba Awards 2020
- Jothe Jotheyali Title Song was Awarded the best Title Song of the year at Zee Kutumba Awards 2020.
