= Hema Bellur =

Indian Kannada film actress

Hema V. Bellur
- Born: Belluru, Karnataka, India
- Education: Gnyana Jyothi Education Center School
- Occupation: Actress

Hema V. Bellur is an Indian actress who works in Kannada television, films and theatre.

== Television ==
She has acted in Kannada soaps/serials such as Charanadasi, Manvanthara, Malebillu, Akku, Gange Gowri, and Nannarasi Radhe.

== Filmography ==
- Suryavamsha (1999) (uncredited)
- Hrudaya Hrudaya (1999) (uncredited)
- Kiladi (2000)
- Vaalee (2001)
- Mysore Huli (2001)
- Dumbee (2003)

== See also ==
- List of people from Karnataka
- Cinema of Karnataka
- List of Indian film actresses
- Cinema of India
