= Shiju AR =

Indian actor (born 1974)

- Born: Shiju Abdul Rasheed; 4 August 1974 (age 52); Kollam, Kerala, India
- Other names: Devi Shiju (Telugu); Vishal (Tamil)
- Citizenship: Indian
- Education: St Albert's School,Ernakulam, SSM Polytechnic College,Tirur
- Occupation: Actor
- Years active: 1994-present
- Children: 1

Shiju Abdul Rasheed (born 4 August 1974), known as Shiju AR, is an Indian actor who works mainly in Malayalam and Telugu films. He is also known by stage name Devi Shiju in Telugu films as he played a lead role in Kodi Ramakrishna's Devi. He has appeared in more than 50 films in Malayalam, Telugu, Tamil, Kannada, English and several popular TV series in Malayalam. Shiju made his comeback to Malayalam mini screen through Neeyum Njanum serial in Zee Keralam.

== Career ==
Shiju has a career that has spanned 27 years from Telugu to Malayalam and on to an international movie. In 1996 was his debut and first success in a Tamil movie named Mahaprabhu as a villain, directed by A. Venkatesh. He further worked in a Telugu movie as a hero named Devi, directed by Kodirama Krishna. He then worked in various movies like Manasantha Nuve, Nuvu Nakku Natchavu, Simharasi and Ammayikosam. Moving on to Mollywood, he worked in IIshtamanu Nooru Vattam, King Solomon,Kalachakram, Sidhartha, Vachalam, etc. He then worked for an international film named In the Name of Buddha, directed by national award winner Rajesh Touchriver.

Shiju took a break in 2004 and shifted his focus into TV serials. He made a comeback with Proprietors: Kammath & Kammath in 2013. Further, he had done Malayalam movies Sound Thoma, Polytechnic, Dolphin Bar, Cousins and Pullipulikalum Aattinkuttiyum etc. Of late he had appeared in roles in Telugu movies, including Kirrak Party, Supreme, Bluff Master, Sathamaanam Bhavathi, Taxiwala and Godse.

== Filmography ==
=== Malayalam films ===
Year	Film	Role	Notes
1995	Mazhavil Koodaram		Debut Film
1996	Ishtamanu Nooru Vattam	Sreeprasad	Debut Lead Film in Lead role
1996	Man of the Match	Gimmy George	
1996	Yuvathruki		
1996	Mahatma The Great		
1996	Kanjirappally Kariachan	College Student	
1996	King Solomon	Ashok Nair	
1997	Vaachalam	Vinod	
1998	Anuragakottaram	Bijoy Wilson	
1998	Sidhartha	Balu	
2001	Mazhamegha Praavukal	Shyam	
2001	Dosth	Shankar	
2002	Kaalachakram	Agnivesh	
2010	Kaaryasthan	Himself	Guest appearance
2013	Proprietors: Kammath & Kammath	Sunnichan	
2013	Sound Thoma	Plapparambil Joykutty	
2013	Pullipulikalum Aattinkuttiyum	Chakka Vijayan	
2013	Nadodimannan	Owner of Demolition Company	
2013	Vishudhan	Monichan	
2013	Ezhu Sundara Rathrikal	Alex's friend	
2014	Cousins	Chandran	
2014	Kuruthamkettavan		
2014	Villali Veeran	CI Martin John	
2014	Avatharam	Bai Jabbar	
2014	Dolphins		
2014	Ring Master	Kishor Kumar	
2014	Polytechnic		
2015	Jamna Pyari		
2016	Pa Va	George	
2018	Oru Pazhaya Bomb Kadha		
2021	One	Satheesh Manohar	

=== Telugu films ===
Year	Film	Role	Notes
1999	Devi	Vijay	Telugu Debut
2000	Shatru		
2001	Simharasi		
2001	Nuvvu Naaku Nachav	Prasad	
2001	Chiranjeevulu	Kiran	
2001	Manasantha Nuvve	Anu's friend	
2002	Adrustam	Robin	
2002	Pasuppu Kunkuma		
2002	Siva Rama Raju	Swati's husband	
2002	Trinetram		
2002	Sambhavi IPS		
2002	Ammayi Kosam		
2005	Ayodhya	Jagan	
2005	Gowtam SSC	Manoj	
2016	Supreme	Raja Rao	
2017	Lanka	Sharat Chandra	
2017	Sathamanam Bhavati	Raju's uncle	
2017	Jai Lava Kusa	Priya's father	
2017	2 Countries	Laya's step-father	
2018	Kirrak Party	Meera's father	
2018	Raju Gadu	Tanvi's father	
2018	Taxiwaala	Raghuram	
2018	Parichayam		
2018	Chandamama Raave		
2018	Uthammudu		
2018	Made For Each Other		
2018	Viswadabhi Rama Vinura Vema		
2018	Bluff Master	ACP Chandra Sekhar	
2019	Jodi	Raju	
2019	Iddari Lokam Okate	Varsha's father	
2021	Anaganaga Oka Rowdy	Reddy	
2021	Kothi Komachi		
2021	Godse	CM	
2021	Raaja Yogam		
2021	Moneyshe		
2023	Hidimba	Police inspector	
2025	Robinhood	Abhinav Vasudev	
2026	Mrithyunjay	Police Commissioner	

=== Other language films ===
Year	Film	Role	Language	Notes
1996	Mahaprabhu	Bhaskar	Tamil	Tamil debut (credited as Vishal; named after producer Janaki Devi's son)
1999	Iraniyan	Aande's right hand	Tamil	Uncredited role
2000	Mr. Kokila		Kannada	Uncredited role
2002	In the Name of Buddha	Dr. Shiva	English; Tamil; Sinhala; Hindi	

== Television (partial) ==
- All TV series are in Malayalam-language, unless otherwise noted.

Year(s)	Title	Network	Notes
2003— 2004	Swantham	Asianet	
2004— 2005	Sthreehridayam	Surya TV	
2004— 2005	Thalolam	Asianet	
2006	Sooryaputhri	Asianet	
2007	Mandaram	Kairali TV	
2007	Nandanam	Surya TV	
2008	Priyamanasi	Surya TV	
2008	Aa Amma	Kairali TV	
2008	Ente Manasaputhri	Asianet	
2009	Sreemahabhagavatham	Asianet	
2009	Pakalmazha	Amrita TV	
2010	Snehatheeram	Surya TV	
2010	Lipstick	Asianet	
2011	Alavudinte albuthavilakku	Asianet	
2011	Autograph	Asianet	
2011— 2013	Akashadoothu	Surya TV	
2012	Agniputhri	Asianet	
2013	Avakashikal	Surya TV	
2014	Sooryakaladi	Amrita TV	
2014— 2015	Prathibimbam	Gemini TV	Telugu Serial
2014— 2015	Karuthamuthu	Asianet	
2015	Punarjani	Surya TV	
2015	Vishwaroopam	Flowers TV	
2016	Jagratha	Amrita TV	
2019— 2020	Sabarimala Swami Ayyapan	Asianet	
2020— 2023	Neeyum Njanum	Zee Keralam	
2020/ 2022	Chembarathi	Zee Keralam	Guest appearance
2020	Sathya Enna Penkutty	Zee Keralam	Guest appearance
2021	Karthikadeepam	Zee Keralam	Guest appearance
2022	Kudumbashree Sharada	Zee Keralam	Guest Appearance in promo
2023	Bigg Boss 5	Asianet	Contestant
2024— present	Akale	Zee Keralam	
