= Akhiyan Udeek Diyan =

Indian Punjabi television series

- Genre: Romance; Drama
- Starring: See below
- Country of origin: India
- Original language: Punjabi
- No. of episodes: 115

Production
- Camera setup: Multi-camera
- Running time: 22 minutes

Original release
- Network: Zee Punjabi
- Release: 22 March – 27 August 2021

Related
- Tula Pahate Re

Akhiyan Udeek Diyan (transl. The eyes are waiting) is an Indian Punjabi language television series that premiered from 22 March 2021 on Zee Punjabi. It starred Simran Kaur, Parmeet Sethi and Keetika Singh in the lead roles. It is an official remake of Zee Marathi's TV series Tula Pahate Re. It ended on 27 August 2021.

== Plot ==
Vikramjeet and Naina marry despite their age difference and resistance from family and friends, but Naina is unaware of the bond she shares with Vikramjeets dead wife.

== Cast ==
- Simran Kaur as Naina
- Parmeet Sethi as Vikramjeet
- Keetika Singh as Simrit
- Narendra Saini
- Meenakshi Chugh

== Adaptations ==
Language	Title	Original release	Network(s)	Last aired	Notes
Marathi	Tula Pahate Re तुला पाहते रे	13 August 2018	Zee Marathi	20 July 2019	Original
Kannada	Jothe Jotheyali ಜೊತೆ ಜೊತೆಯಲಿ	9 September 2019	Zee Kannada	19 May 2023	Remake
Telugu	Prema Entha Madhuram ప్రేమ ఎంత మధురం	10 February 2020	Zee Telugu	5 July 2025	Remake
Malayalam	Neeyum Njanum നീയും ഞാനും	10 February 2020	Zee Keralam	8 April 2023	Remake
Tamil	Neethane Enthan Ponvasantham நீதானே எந்தன் பொன்வசந்தம்	24 February 2020	Zee Tamil	25 December 2021	Remake
Punjabi	Akhiyan Udeek Diyan ਅੱਖੀਆਂ ਉਡੀਕ ਦੀਆਂ	22 March 2021	Zee Punjabi	27 August 2021	Remake
Hindi	Tumm Se Tumm Tak तुम से तुम तक	7 July 2025	Zee TV	Ongoing	Remake
