= Unity (concept) =

Unity is the state of being one. It is often a combination of many parts, elements and individuals into an effective whole. It is defined as the state of being undivided or unbroken completeness or totality with nothing wanting. It is the smallest whole numeral representation. It is applicable to people and objects forming whole notions of any concept. It implies oneness when there is a certain usual division.

== Spiritual unity ==
Within the Ahmadiyya understanding of Islam, the Islamic concept of Unity of God, often referred to as Oneness of God, in application to humans, inculcates in man the realisation of the oneness of the human species, and does away with all such barriers as divide man into racial, ethnic and colour denominations. This gives birth to the universal concept of equality in Islam. Hence from the vantage point of God, all human beings, wherever and in whichever age they were born, stand equal in His sight. The Qur'an views that in the history of mankind prophets or messengers were sent to every nation or society to guide people towards God in every age. For this reason, with support from theological study, Ahmadis recognise many of the world faiths as having divine origin and their founders as divinely appointed individuals, such as Zoroaster, Buddha, Krishna and Confucius. The founder of the Ahmadiyya community, Mirza Ghulam Ahmad explained how the teachings of various faiths all converged to Islam as a universal religion.

Three core assertions of the Bahá'í Faith, sometimes termed the "three onenesses", are central in the teachings of the religion. They are the Oneness of God, the Oneness of Religion and the Oneness of Humanity. They are also referred to as the unity of God, unity of religion, and unity of mankind. The Bahá'í writings state that there is a single, all powerful God, revealing his message through a series of divine messengers or educators, regarding them as one progressively revealed religion, to one single humanity, who all possess a rational soul and only differ according to colour and culture. This idea is fundamental not only to explaining Bahá'í beliefs, but explaining the attitude Bahá'ís have towards other religions, which they regard as divinely inspired. The acceptance of every race and culture in the world has brought Bahá'í demographics an incredible diversity, becoming the second most widespread faith in the world, and translating its literature into over 800 languages.

In Kabbalah, unity amongst people is a method for achieving spirituality. Kabbalist Yehuda Ashlag stated in his article, "Unity of Friends," that “the important thing that stands before you today is the unity of friends. Toil in that more and more, for it can compensate for all the faults.” His son, Kabbalist Baruch Ashlag, also emphasized a method among friends that involved unity to reach the spiritual. In previous generations Kabbalists such as Rav Abraham Kook argued that the affirmation of God aspires to reveal unity in the world as it is the basis of all spiritual knowledge and one the highest notions which mankind can perceive.

== Sense of community ==
Sense of community (or psychological sense of community) is a concept in social psychology (or more narrowly, in community psychology), as well as in several other research disciplines, such as urban sociology, which focuses on the experience of community rather than its structure, formation, setting, or other features. Sociologists, social psychologists, anthropologists, and others have theorized about and carried out empirical research on community, but the psychological approach asks questions about the individual's perception, understanding, attitudes, feelings, etc. about community and his or her relationship to it and to others' participation – indeed to the complete, multifaceted community experience.

In his seminal 1974 book, psychologist Seymour B. Sarason proposed that Psychological Sense of Community become the conceptual center for the psychology of community, asserting that it "is one of the major bases for self-definition." By 1986 it was regarded as a central overarching concept for Community Psychology (Sarason, 1986; Chavis & Pretty, 1999).

Among theories of Sense of Community proposed by psychologists, McMillan & Chavis's (1986) is by far the most influential, and is the starting point for most of the recent research in the field. It is discussed in detail below. There's a group in Ottawa called: Unity. The singers are Adam Saint-Fleur, Gottfried Blaise St-Vil, Nick Manigat, Gaddi August Jean-Julien, Djemcy Latortue, Sébastien Christian Duffaut and Judson Clarke. Created by: Catheline Saint-Fleur. They sing gospel song, for the glory of God. They are real popular, in the churches in Ottawa.
