= Anuraga Sangama =

- VCD cover
- Directed by: V. Umakanth
- Written by: V. Umakanth
- Produced by: D. Govindappa
- Starring: Kumar Govind; Ramesh Aravind; Sudharani
- Cinematography: Sundarnath Suvarna
- Edited by: S. Prasad
- Music by: V. Manohar
- Production company: S. K. Films Syndicate
- Release date: 31 August 1995
- Running time: 130 minutes
- Country: India
- Language: Kannada

Anuraga Sangama is a 1995 Indian Kannada-language romantic drama film directed and written by V. Umakanth. The film stars Kumar Govind, Ramesh Aravind and Sudharani. The film is loosely inspired by the Charlie Chaplin film City Lights. The same film was remade in Telugu in 1997 as Pelli Pandiri, in Tamil in 1999 as Nilave Mugam Kaattu and in Hindi in 2006 as Humko Tumse Pyaar Hai.

== Cast ==
- Kumar Govind as Govind
- Ramesh Aravind as Ramesh
- Sudharani as Kasthuri
- B. Saroja Devi as Dr. Vasanthi
- Tennis Krishna as Rambha Kola
- Lohithaswa as Raja Rao
- Krishne Gowda as constable
- Bank Janardhan as Setty
- V. Manohar as Seena
- Mico Seetharam
- Mimicry Rajagopal as photographer's assistant
- Gandasi Nagaraj
- Vaijanath Biradar
- Ashalatha as Asha
- Bhagyashree
- Master Santhosh
- Baby Sneha

== Soundtrack ==
All the songs are composed, scored and lyrics written by V. Manohar. The song "O Mallige Ninnondige" was an instant hit and won the singer Ramesh Chandra Karnataka State Film Award for Best Male Playback Singer.

Song title	Singer(s)
"O Mallige"	Ramesh Chandra
"Thavare O Thavare"	S. P. Balasubrahmanyam, Sudharani
"Sangama Sangama"	S. P. Balasubrahmanyam, Chandrika Gururaj
"O Bandhuve"	Chandrika Gururaj
"Diya Diya Do"	S. P. Balasubrahmanyam, Master Chetan, Master Rajesh
"Oho Monalisa"	Rajesh Krishnan
