= Humko Tumse Pyaar Hai =

2006 Indian film by Bunty Soorma & Vikram Bhatt

- Theatrical release poster
- Directed by: Vikram Bhatt; Bunty Soorma
- Screenplay by: Ashok Roy
- Dialgues by: Javed Siddiqui
- Story by: Bunty Soorma (Adaptation); V. Umakanth (Original)
- Based on: Anuraga Sangama by V. Umakanth
- Produced by: Vijay Taneja
- Starring: Bobby Deol; Arjun Rampal; Ameesha Patel
- Cinematography: Nirmal Jani
- Edited by: Bharat Singh
- Music by: Anand Raaj Anand
- Production company: Cineyugg Entertainment
- Release date: 24 February 2006 (India)
- Running time: 130 minutes
- Country: India
- Language: Hindi
- Budget: ₹7.5 crore
- Box office: ₹4.33 crore

Humko Tumse Pyaar Hai (transl. I Love You) is a 2006 Indian Hindi-language romantic drama film directed by Bunty Soorma (Later completed by Vikram Bhatt) starring Bobby Deol, Arjun Rampal, and Ameesha Patel. It is a remake of the 1995 Kannada film Anuraga Sangama. The film's premise revolves around a blind woman who struggles to come to terms with her first love, who has been killed, and a new love who wants to help her move on with her life.

== Plot ==
Durga is a blind woman with a talent for shaping pottery. She is poor and lives with her widowed mother in a village. She meets Rohit aka Babu, who saves her life. The pair become friends and fall in love. Durga creates a clay bust of Rohit by feeling Rohit's facial features, but she weeps because she cannot see it. Rohit tells her he will find a way to help her see again.

When Durga's mother is killed by village goon Rana, Rohit promises to marry her and take care of her. He takes her to a hospital where she will have surgery to regain her sight. While she is recovering (before the bandages are removed), Rana, angry that he was rejected by Durga, attempts to murder Rohit, who goes missing.

Upon receiving news of Rohit's death, Durga goes into depression. Dr. Prasad, her doctor, is there when she meets Raj, a businessman who falls in love with her. He, too, is grieving a dead friend and recognizes that Durga is also lonely. Through his persistence and kindness, Durga finally accepts Raj's marriage proposal. Unknown to both, Durga's first love and Raj's dead friend are the same man, Rohit.

On the day of Raj and Durga's engagement, Raj is told that Rohit is alive and has been in a coma for six months, but has woken up and is in a hospital. Raj retrieves Rohit, and they return to the house in time for the engagement. Rohit is shocked to discover that Raj's fiancée is Durga, but stays quiet for his friend's happiness.

Raj introduces Rohit to Durga, but Rohit purposely doesn't speak in front of her so as to avoid her recognizing his voice. However, Durga overhears Rohit speak, recognizes his voice, and confronts him, wanting to know whether Rohit is really the man she loved. Rohit denies it, but Durga is not convinced. She calls Dr. Prasad, as he had met Rohit before, but the doctor tells her that Rohit is not her long-lost love, following Rohit's instructions to lie to her. Durga then accepts this and does not question Rohit anymore.

One night, the lights go out in Raj's home, and Durga and Rohit bump into each other. In the dark, Durga's hand goes up to feel Rohit's face, which she recognizes. Rohit flees, and in tears, Durga blindfolds herself and recreates the clay bust of her love, relying on memory alone. When it's completed, she realizes the truth. Rohit asks her whether it would be right to destroy Raj's happiness after all he has been through. Durga reluctantly agrees, and they decide to keep the secret.

On the day of the wedding, Raj publicly confronts the pair. He accuses Rohit of trying to steal Durga from him. Rohit quietly accepts the accusation. Durga gets defensive and speaks up for him, exposing the truth of their past. It is then revealed that Raj's behavior was a ruse to make them reveal the truth. He gladly steps aside to reunite the lovers.

== Cast ==
- Bobby Deol as Raj Malhotra
- Arjun Rampal as Rohit 'Babu'
- Ameesha Patel as Durga
- Suhasini Mulay as Durga's mother
- Parmeet Sethi as Rana
- Kanwaljit Singh as Dr. R. K. Prasad
- Achint Kaur
- Anang Desai as Mr. Malhotra, Raj’s father
- Beena Banerjee as Mrs. Malhotra, Raj’s mother
- Asha Sharma as Raj's grandmother
- Vivek Shauq

== Reception ==
Taran Adarsh of Bollywood Hungama gave the film 2 out of 5, writing, "On the whole, HUMKO TUMSE PYAAR HAI is a decent entertainer, but there are two major factors that go against it: Lack of hype and a not too happening star cast." Priyanka Jain of Rediff.com called the film "predictable.". She further wrote, "A rustic setting with lots of colour, coupled with a love triangle, ought to make for good viewing. A short trip to another world, if nothing else. Sadly, Humko Tumse Pyaar Hai has little to offer. There is a short negative role essayed by a villain called Rana (Parmeet Sethi), and a few romance sequences presented in a refreshingly original manner. But, nothing else."
