= Sathya (2010 film) =

- Sathya Movie
- Directed by: Kumar Govind
- Written by: Kumar Govind
- Produced by: Kumar Govind
- Starring: Kumar Govind; Dimple
- Cinematography: Lal Babu
- Edited by: K Eshwar
- Music by: Gautham
- Production company: S K Films
- Release date: 2 April 2010
- Country: India
- Language: Kannada

Sathya is a 2010 Indian Kannada romance drama film written and directed and produced by Kumar Govind under the banner S K Films. It stars Kumar Govind and Dimple. The film was a box office failure.

== Cast ==
- Kumar Govind as Sathya
- Dimple
- Padma Vasanthi
- Srishailan
- Ravishankar

== Production ==
The film began production in 2006 and filming was held at places like Kulu Manali, Agra, Taj Mahal, Fatepur Sikri, Jaipur, Jaisalmer, Mumbai and Karwar.

== Soundtrack ==
Sathya

Soundtrack album by Gautham
- Released: 2010
- Genre: Feature film soundtrack
- Label: Star Music
- Producer: Kumar Govind

Tracklist
No.	Title	Lyrics	Singer(s)	Length
1.	"Premave Premave"	Akhilendran	Gautham, Sreeraksha Aravind
2.	"O Nanna Devathe"	V. Nagendra Prasad	Anoop Seelin
3.	"Akshara Akshara Eradakshara"	V. Nagendra Prasad	Anoop Seelin
4.	"Yaarigagi Ee Raaga"	Akhilendran	Anoop Seelin
5.	"Manase Yaare Neenu"	K. Kalyan	Anoop Seelin, Sreeraksha Aravind

== Awards ==
Ceremony	Category	Recipient	Song	Result
Karnataka State Film Awards	Best Lyricist 2010	V. Nagendra Prasad	"Akshara Akshara Eradakshara"	Won
