= Yaaradu =

Kannada language film

Yaaradu (ಯಾರದು)
- Directed by: Srinivas Kaushik
- Produced by: M Leelavathi
- Starring: Vinod Raj; Ashwini
- Cinematography: Nagesh V Acharya
- Edited by: Srinivas P Babu
- Music by: Akhil G
- Release date: 23 October 2009
- Country: India
- Language: Kannada

Yaaradu (Kannada: ಯಾರದು) (transl. Who is it?) is a 2009 Indian Kannada-language film directed by Srinivas Kaushik, starring Vinod Raj and Ashwini in lead roles.

== Cast ==
- Vinod Raj as Pratap
- M Leelavathi as Mary
- Ashwini
- Nihal as John
- Anushree
- Suman Jadugar as Vijay
- Manjunath
- Shanthakumar
- Sadashiva Brahmavar as Utthappa

== Music ==
Yaaradu

Soundtrack album by Akhil G
- Released: 2009
- Recorded: 2009
- Genre: Feature film soundtrack
- Length: 17:40
- Language: Kannada

Official audio
- Yaaradu - Full Album on YouTube

Track listing
No.	Title	Singer(s)	Length
1.	"Happy Birthday"	Sunitha, Santhosh	4:43
2.	"Kanda Kanda"	Sunitha	5:18
3.	"Jagala Jagala"	Vinod Raj	3:58
4.	"Noduba Kanthumba"	Anuradha Bhat, Santhosh	4:21
Total length:			17:40

== Reception ==
=== Critical response ===
R G Vijayasarathy of Rediff.com scored the film at 3 out of 5 stars and says "Performance-wise Ashwini's insignificant role does not bring in any relief to the film despite her glam look in a song sequence. It is Suman Jadugar in the role of Viji who has given a creditable performance. All the other artists including the one who play the role of Leelavathi's son have done well in their respective roles. All in all Yaaradhu is certainly a treat for fans of suspense films". Deccan Herald wrote "G Akhil’s music has a soul of its own, which comes to life at critical moments, supplementing Nagesh Acharya’s cinematography and the DI work thereafter. ‘Yaaradu’ definitely scores". The Times of India scored the film at 3 out of 5 stars and says "Leelavathi lives up to her reputation and has done an excellent job. Suman Jadugar shines. Vinodraj impresses. Ashwini does a neat job in her brief appearance. Music by G Akhil and camerawork by Nagesh Acharya are superb" Sify.com scored the film at 3 out of 5 stars and wrote "There is sharp editing and splendid cinematography from Nagesh Acharya. Jaga Jaga Jagavella Jagala?. song has good lyrics and choreography is fabulous. Akil the newcomer in the music shows promises to shine". Bangalore Mirror wrote "It is the sharp editing and some eye-catching camerawork that gives this film a neat look. Leelavathi proves that age is no bar for a good actor. If you enjoy a scare watch Yaaradu".
