= Good Luck (2006 film) =

Indian Kannada-language romantic drama film

- VCD cover
- Directed by: S. Nandakumar
- Written by: S. Nandakumar
- Produced by: R. Srinivasa Shetty; P. Srinivasa Reddy; K. Manju (presenter)
- Starring: Anirudh; Radhika; Naveen Krishna; Damini
- Cinematography: P. K. H. Das
- Edited by: T. Shashikumar
- Music by: Rajesh Ramanath
- Production company: Thirumala Cine Productions
- Release date: 23 June 2006
- Country: India
- Language: Kannada

Good Luck is a 2006 Indian Kannada-language romantic drama film directed by Nandakumar and starring Anirudh, Radhika, Naveen Krishna, and Damini.

== Cast ==
- Anirudh as Ani
- Radhika as Mandakini
- Naveen Krishna as Ajay
- Damini as Sheeba
- Chitra Shenoy as Mandakini's mother
- A. T. Raghu as director
- Michael Madhu as modeling coordinator

== Production ==
This film marks the directorial debut of journalist Nandakumar and was launched on Vijayadashami 2004. Set in the modelling world, Anirudh plays a costume designer, Radhika plays a model and Naveen Krishna plays a modeling coordinator. Durga Shetty was to play another heroine, but she was replaced by Damini. The songs were recorded at Akash Studios in October 2004.

== Music ==
The music was composed by Rajesh Ramanath with lyrics by S. Nandakumar.

Track listing
No.	Title	Singer(s)	Length
1.	"Jinu Jinugoke"	B. Jayashree	3:27
2.	"Neene Nambike"	L. N. Shastri, Vidya	4:42
3.	"Ee Ondu Kshanakagi"	Chetan Sosca, Chaitra H. G.	4:45
4.	"Tiputopu"	Chaitra H. G.	4:42
5.	"Ye Preethi"	Hemanth	4:55
6.	"Ye Preethi" (Sad)	Hemanth	4:55
Total length:			27:26

== Reception ==
R. G. Vijayasarathy of IANS wrote, "Good Luck tells the story of a modeling world which was an alien space for the Kannada films so far. It may not be a very good offering, but a film which could be watched for being a little different. The film is alive, but not kicking to the expected levels". A critic from Rediff.com rated the film 2.5/5 stars and wrote, "All in all, Good Luck is an above-average film. It could have been a better presentation if Nandakumar had explored the glamour world in more detail".
