= Master Mind (2015 film) =

2015 Indian film in Kannada language

- Directed by: Kumar Govind
- Written by: Kumar Govind
- Produced by: Kumar Govind
- Starring: Rajvardhan; Kumar Govind; Thamanna; Bhakthi; Divya Gowda
- Cinematography: A C Mahendar
- Edited by: Harish G
- Music by: M Fazil
- Production company: Kumar Govind Films
- Release date: 14 March 2015
- Country: India
- Language: Kannada

Master Mind is a 2015 Indian Kannada-language film written, produced, and directed by Kumar Govind. The film stars Rajvardhan, Kumar Govind, Thamanna Pasha, Divya Gowda, and Bhakthi. The film is inspired by the Korean film Oldboy (2003).

== Cast ==
- Rajvardhan as Raj
- Kumar Govind as Mahesh
- Thamanna Pasha as Seema
- Divya Gowda as Madhu
- Bhakthi as Anu
- Bullet Prakash

== Production ==
The film marked the return of Thamanna Pasha, who previously acted in Swayam Krushi (2011). She plays a taxi driver in the film. The film was shot in Thailand.

== Reception ==
GS Kumar of The Times of India gave the film a rating of 3/5 and wrote "Rajavardhan is impressive as the formidable Raj. Tamanna Pasha’s brilliant portrayal of the taxi driver makes her stand out. Divya Gowda and Kumar Govind play their parts with ease. Music by M Fazil is average". Shyam Prasad S of Bangalore Mirror gave the film a rating of 1/5 and wrote "Apart from Raj Vardhan’s unappetising performance, Tamanna’s Kannada, which gives Pooja Gandhi a run for her money, has to be endured. Only ‘Bullet ‘Prakash manages to act in the entire film". Sify.com wrote "M Fazil seems to have scored the film for the heck of it, nothing special about it. Unfortunately there is not even a single element that can draw audience to theatres! The movie is a total waste of time and can be avoided even if it is played on TV, in near future!" SV from Deccan Herald wrote "Suffice to say Master Mind may not be masterly but much, much better than the weekly tripe dished out at theatres". A Sharadhaa from The New Indian Express wrote "Master Mind fails on several counts and mostly it fails the audience and their faith in the actor-director who had the courage to introduce a new face — Raj Vardhan — in an otherwise big-budget film. This turned to be a poor choice as the actor cannot act, run, dance, deliver dialogues and nor does he have the ability to emote. The film’s tagline - "The Game of Death", is ominous as it alludes to its own death knell at the box office".
