= September 8 (film) =

- Directed by: Richard Castelino
- Written by: Vasnath V Amin
- Produced by: Richard Castelino
- Starring: Sunil; Shivaram Karanth; Geetha; Shruti; Umashree; Ramesh Bhat
- Cinematography: Sundarnath Suvarna; Venkatarathnam; Mahendra; Chittibabu; Malesh; Venkatesh
- Music by: Ragdev
- Production company: Rajalakshmi Films
- Release date: 7 May 1994
- Country: India
- Language: Tulu
- Budget: ₹ 17 lakh

September 8 is a 1994 Indian Tulu-language film directed and produced by Richard Castelino and starring Sunil, Shivaram Karanth, Geetha, Shruti, Umashree and Ramesh Bhat. The film was shot in 24 hours with seven cinematographers including Sundarnath Suvarna. It was the 26th Tulu film to be released and was released after Richard Castelino's Bangar Patler (1993).

== Cast ==
- Sunil
- Shivaram Karanth
- Geetha
- Shruti
- Umashree
- Ramesh Bhat
- Bank Janardhan
- Sathyabhama
- Sarojini Shetty
- Anand Bolar
- Sundeep Malani

== Production ==
The film was shot on 8 September from 6 a.m. to 6 p.m. in Mangaluru.

== Soundtrack ==
The music was composed by Ragdev, written by Rama Kirodiyan, and sung by S. P. Balasubrahmanyam, Chandrika Gururaj, Kasturi Shankar, and Manjula Gururaj.

== Release ==
The film was released on 7 May 1994 in Jyothi theatre (now closed) in Mangaluru but was a box office failure.
