= Aniruddha Jatkar =

Indian film and theatre artist

- Born: 16 February 1974 (age 52); Mumbai, Maharastra, India
- Other name: Anirudh
- Education: L. S. Raheja School of Architecture
- Occupation: Actor
- Relatives: Vishnuvardhan (Father-in-law), Bharathi Vishnuvardhan (Mother-in-law)

Aniruddha Jatkar (born February 16, 1974), mononymously known as Anirudh, is an Indian film and television actor who primarily works in Kannada cinema. He is the son-in-law of the Kannada film actors Vishnuvardhan and Bharathi Vishnuvardhan. He has also worked in Marathi and Tamil films. He is known for his role in the Kannada TV series Jothe Jotheyali.

Jatkar is also a documentary filmmaker. He has made a total of 20 records.

== Career ==
=== Short films ===
Jatkar has made six short films that were released on September 18, 2018, in memory of the late actor Vishnuvardhan's birth anniversary.

Smoke, Save, Vaishnav Jan To, Water, Candlelight, Shantam Papam. The films Candlelight and Shantam Papam released in both English and Kannada.

Jatkar's short films have records set in the India Book of Records, Asia Book of Records and Kalam’s World Records for releasing the most number of short films across different genres, on social issues, and without dialogues on the same day.

=== Documentary films ===
Jatkar has directed a documentary based on the life of actress Bharathi Vishnuvardhan, who is also his mother-in-law. The film, Baale Bangaara, received a special jury mention at the 69th National Film Awards in 2021, the most prominent film awards ceremony in India. He spent three years making the film.

=== Television ===
Jatkar is the male protagonist of the Kannada serial Jothe Jotheyali. It was the show with the highest TRP in its opening week and one of the most watched show on Kannada television. The series is an official remake of the Marathi show Tula Pahate Re. He was ousted from the show following reports of rude behavior on set.

=== Sahasa Simha Comic series ===
Sahasa Simha Comic series is a comic in South India which revolves around Detective Sahasa Simha who solves mysteries with the help of his grandchildren and fights through social issues.

== Filmography ==
Year	Title	Role	Notes	Ref.
2001	Chitte	Anil		
2001	Chitra	Ramu's friend		
2002	Thuntata	Sachin		
2002	Mutham	Joe	Tamil film; credited as Ajayan	
2003	Lovva Illa Dovva			
2003	Panchali			
2004	Jyeshtha	Ani		
2005	Rama Shama Bhama	Raja		
2006	Good Luck	Ani		
2006	Neenello Naanalle	Santosh		
2006	Dor	Shankar Singh	Hindi film	
2007	Tamashegagi	Anil		
2007	Sathyavan Savithri	Sharabu		
2007	Nali Naliyutha	Surya		
2010	Ijjodu	Satya		
2010	Kunidu Kunidu Ba Re		Also playback singer	
2014	Saam Daam Dand Bhedh		Marathi film	
2015	Shabari Male Yatre			
2017	Kalaberake			
2017	Marali Manege		Guest appearance	
2018	Raja Simha	Satya		
2018	Abhayhasta		Guest appearance	
2023	Triple Riding	Dr. Prem		
2024	Chef Chidambara	Chidambara		

== Television ==
Year	Show	Role	Channel	Notes
2009	Daddy No.1	Host	Zee Kannada	
2019–2022	Jothe Jotheyali	Aryavardhan alias Subash Patil	Zee Kannada	replaced by Harish Raj
2024-	Suryavamsha		Udaya TV	
