= Rajasimha (film) =

2018 Indian Kannada-language action film directed by Ravi Ram

- Theatrical Release poster
- Directed by: Ravi Ram
- Written by: Ravi Ram
- Story by: Ravi Ram
- Produced by: C. D. Basappa
- Starring: Aniruddha; Nikita Thukral; Sanjjana
- Cinematography: K. M. Vishnuvardhan
- Edited by: K. M. Prakash
- Music by: Sadhu Kokila
- Production company: Veer Maasthi Movies
- Release date: 2 February 2018
- Language: Kannada

Rajasimha is a 2018 Indian Kannada-language action film directed by debutante Ravi Ram and produced by C. D. Basappa. The film features Aniruddha, Nikita Thukral and Sanjjana in the lead roles along with Bharathi Vishnuvardhan, Sharath Lohitashwa and Arun Sagar in key supporting roles. While Ambareesh plays a cameo role, the popular actor Vishnuvardhan appears on the screen through a computer generated visual effect. The film is reported to be a sequel of Vishnuvardhan's hit Simhadriya Simha (2002). The film's soundtrack is composed by Jassie Gift and the background score is by Sadhu Kokila. The film was released across Karnataka on 2 February 2018.

== Cast ==
- Aniruddha as Satya
- Nikita Thukral as Priya
- Sanjjana as Sanju
- Bharathi Vishnuvardhan
- Sharath Lohitashwa
- Arun Sagar
- Bullet Prakash
- Vijay Chendoor
- Ambareesh (Cameo Appearance)
- Vishnuvardhan as Narasimhe Gowda (Cameo Appearance)

== Soundtrack ==
Rajasimha

Soundtrack album by Jassie Gift
- Recorded: 2017
- Genre: Feature film soundtrack
- Language: Kannada
- Label: Anand Audio
- Producer: Jassie Gift

The film's soundtracks are composed by Jassie Gift. The music rights were acquired by Anand Audio.

Tracklist
No.	Title	Lyrics	Singer(s)	Length
1.	"Yentha Bhagya"	Nelamane Raghavendra	L. N. Shastri	04:40
2.	"Missamma Yamma"	Kaviraj	Jassie Gift, Indu Nagaraj	03:45
3.	"Khadak Kadhar"	Nelamane Raghavendra	Tippu	04:20
4.	"Gulabu Jamunu"	Ghouse Peer	Malathi, C. D. Basappa	03:18
5.	"Bandha Devara Haage"	Nelamane Raghavendra	Vikas Chintan, Suma Shastri	04:34
6.	"Baaro Nalla Baaro"	Nelamane Raghavendra	Santhosh Venky, Anuradha Bhat	04:02

== Reception ==
=== Critical response ===
Sunayana Suresh of The Times of India scored the film at 2 out of 5 stars and says "given that this was a tribute film in many ways, one feels let down, as the matinee idol's name is dragged in a film that otherwise would be just another normal commercial potboiler. Though, do give it a try if you like old school masala films." A Sharadhha of The New Indian Express scored the film at 2 out of 5 stars and says "Time and again, attempts have been made to bring back legends on screen with little success, and Rajasimha is just another film to join the bandwagon."Vijaya Karnataka scored the film at 2 out of 5 stars and wrote "Experienced artists are directors who have used Tara, but have not used them properly. Suddenly the songs, laughter and comedy scenes have made Raja Sinha Cinema a falawa movie."
