= Vaalee (2001 film) =

2001 film directed by S. Mahendar

- DVD cover
- Directed by: S. Mahendar
- Written by: R. Rajashekhar (Dialogues)
- Screenplay by: S. Mahendar
- Story by: S. J. Suryah
- Based on: Vaalee (Tamil)
- Produced by: Ramesh Yadav
- Starring: Sudeep; Poonam Singar
- Cinematography: Sundarnath Suvarna
- Edited by: P. R. Soundar Raj
- Music by: Rajesh Ramanath Sourced from Deva
- Production company: Royal Pictures
- Distributed by: Ramu Enterprises
- Release date: 19 October 2001
- Running time: 159 minutes
- Country: India
- Language: Kannada

Vaalee is a 2001 Indian Kannada-language romantic psychological thriller film directed by S. Mahendar starring Sudeep in a dual role and Poonam Singar. The film features background score and soundtrack composed by Rajesh Ramanath Original Compositions by Deva and lyrics by K. Kalyan. It is a remake of the 1999 Tamil film of the same name.

The film was released on 19 October 2001 and had a above average box office run.

== Plot ==
Deva and Shiva are twin brothers. Deva, the elder one is deaf and mute, but he is a genius, an expert at lip-reading and the head of a successful advertising company. Shiva loves and trusts his brother. Priya wants to only marry someone who is an ex-smoker, an ex-drunkard and ditched by a girl but still pining for her. Learning this, Shiva invents an old romance between him and Sona and finds his way into Priya's heart.

Deva meanwhile chances upon Priya and becomes obsessed with attaining her. His obsession continues even after his younger brother marries the girl of his dreams and he devises various means of getting close to Priya while keeping Shiva and her separated. Some of the methods Deva uses to woo Priya are masochistic (wounding his hand by a running car engine to stop the couple’s first night) and psychotic (trying to kill his brother in so many ways).

While Shiva is away, Priya has to take care of Deva. Priya realises the not-so-honourable intentions Deva has towards her but Shiva refuses to believe her and has full faith in his brother. He even goes so far as to take Priya to a psychiatrist. To get away from it all, Shiva and Priya go on a long-delayed honeymoon. But Deva shows up there too. Shiva watches Deva kissing the photo of Priya and realises Priya was right all along. Deva beats Shiva mercilessly, packs the unconscious Shiva in a gunny bag and throws him in a lorry.

Deva disguises himself as Shiva and goes near Priya. Priya realises he is Deva and escapes from him before shooting him with her revolver. Deva falls into a pool and dies. Deva's soul talks about his inability to express his feelings as he was mute. Shiva arrives and she narrates the whole incident to him. They hug tearfully.

== Cast ==
- Sudeep in a dual role as Shiva and Deva
- Poonam Singar as Priya
- Divyashree as Sona / Meena
- Sadhu Kokila as Vicky
- Bank Janardhan as roadside shop owner
- K S Sridhar as Sridhar
- Michael Madhu as Arogyadas
- Mimicry Rajagopal as roadside shop customer
- R. G. Vijayasarathy as Bhootaraya
- Shanthammma as Shiva's and Deva's grandmother
- Hema Bellur as Sheela
- Gurukiran in a guest appearance as Ravi

Uncredited

- Ashok Rao as Lakshman, Priya's father
- Mandeep Roy as detective

== Production ==
The film was launched on 27 July 2001 at Kanteerava Studios. The negative role of Sudeep marked a contrast to his then lover boy image.

== Soundtrack ==
Vaalee

Soundtrack album by Rajesh Ramanath
- Released: August 19 2001
- Genre: Feature film soundtrack
- Length: 28:23
- Language: Kannada
- Label: Anand Audio
- Producer: Rajesh Ramanath (Original tunes reused)

Rajesh Ramanath chronology
Huchcha (2001)	Vaalee (2001)	Ninne Preethisuve (2002)
External audio
- Official Audio Jukebox on YouTube

The soundtrack was composed by Rajesh Ramanath, reusing all the tunes from the original Tamil version, which was originally composed by Deva. The song "O Sona O Sona" is based on "Susanna" by VOF de Kunst.

Track listing
No.	Title	Lyrics	Singer(s)	Length
1.	"O Sona O Sona"	K. Kalyan	Hariharan, Sudeep (speaking portions)
2.	"Vasantha Maasadalli"	K. Kalyan	P. Unnikrishnan, Sudeep (speaking portions), Anuradha Sriram
3.	"Dil Meri Dil"	K. Kalyan	Gurukiran and Ganga
4.	"Mele Chandrana"	K. Kalyan	Anuradha Sriram and Rajesh Krishnan
5.	"Chandirana Hididu"	K. Kalyan	P. Unni Krishnan and Anuradha Sriram

== Awards ==
Filmfare Awards South

- Nominated, Best Film
- Nominated, Best Director - S. Mahendar
- Nominated, Best Music Director - Rajesh Ramanath
