= Asura (2001 film) =

2001 film by S. Mahendar

- Theatrical release poster
- Directed by: S. Mahendar
- Written by: M. S. Ramesh [Dialogues]
- Screenplay by: S. Mahender
- Story by: Saran
- Based on: Amarkkalam (Tamil)
- Produced by: Sandesh Swamy
- Starring: Shiva Rajkumar; Damini
- Cinematography: Krishna Kumar
- Edited by: P. R. Sounder Raj
- Music by: Gurukiran
- Production company: Sandesh Combines
- Distributed by: Ramu Films
- Release date: 23 March 2001
- Running time: 2 hours 29 minutes
- Country: India
- Language: Kannada

Asura (transl. Demon) is a 2001 Indian Kannada-language action film directed by S. Mahendar, starring Shiva Rajkumar and Damini, with Raghuvaran and Ananth Nag in other pivotal roles.

The film is about an underworld don's henchman who falls in love with a police officer's adopted daughter. The film is a remake of the 1999 Tamil film Amarkkalam.

== Cast ==
- Shiva Rajkumar as Vasu
- Damini as Mohana
- Raghuvaran as Tulasi
- Ananth Nag as Birla Bose
- Chitra Shenoy as Gayathri
- Kazan Khan as Don Jayaraj
- Doddanna as Theatre manager
- Sharan as Billa
- Michael Madhu as Ranga
- Aravind as Ashok Bose
- Kote Prabhakar
- Girish Shetty
- Vijay Kumar as Ranjith Bose
- Mandya Ramesh as Cheluva
- Vanitha Vasu as Ganga
- Pushpa Swamy
- Raghava Lawrence in a special appearance in the song 'Maha Ganapathi'

== Production ==
Hamsalekha backed out of the film due to his lack of interest in reusing the songs from the original film.

== Soundtrack ==
The film's score and the soundtrack were composed by Gurukiran. All songs were retained as the same tune from the original version by Bharadwaj.

All lyrics are written by K. Kalyan.

Track-list
No.	Title	Singer(s)	Length
1.	"Enu Madideyo"	Rajesh Krishnan	2:20
2.	"Hello Hello Naina"	Sowmya Raoh	5:00
3.	"Karuneyillada Dharaniya"	Rajesh Krishnan, Nanditha	4:18
4.	"Nangu Modalu Ningu Modalu"	K. S. Chithra, Rajesh Krishnan	5:19
5.	"Preethige Beleyilla"	Rajesh Krishnan	5:45
6.	"Maha Ganapathi"	Rajesh Krishnan	4:54

== Reception ==
A critic from Chitraloka.com wrote that "Forget that this is a remake there are good elements to enjoy". A critic from Sify wrote that "On the whole it is an above average film, a good entertainer".
