= Kumar Govind =

Indian actor

- Born: 17 May 1963 (age 62)
- Occupations: Film actor, producer, director
- Years active: 1993–present

Kumar Govind is an Indian actor and director in the Kannada film industry, known for starring in hit films like Shhh!, his debut as a hero and Anuraga Sangama with Ramesh Aravind and Sudha Rani.

== Career ==
Kumar Govind made his acting debut with horror film Sshhh (1993) directed by Upendra for which was also a producer. The film became successful and made him popular. He was also appreciated for his role of innocent Govindu in Anuraga Sangama (1994). Kumar Govind was initially offered the leading role in Om (1995) which did not materialize.

== Filmography ==
=== As director, writer, and producer ===
Year	Film	Director	Writer	Producer	Ref.
1993	Sshhh			Yes	
2010	Sathya	Yes	Yes	Yes	
2015	Master Mind	Yes	Yes	Yes	

=== As actor ===
Year	Title	Role	Notes
1993	Sshhh	Kumar	
1994	Kona Edaithe	Krishna, Gaya Ramayya	Dual roles
1995	Anuraga Sangama	Govind	
1996	Minugu Thare		
1997	Maduve	Prithvi	
1997	Thaayi Kotta Seere		
1997	Ee Hrudaya Ninagaagi		
1997	Nodu Baa Nammoora		
1997	Shruti Hakida Hejje		
1998	Kardipura		
1998	Raviteja		
1998	Ohh Gandasare Neevu Yeshtu Oleyavaru		
1998	Mruthyu Bandana		
2000	Mayabazar		
2001	Vande Matharam	Citizen rights council member	
2001	Mahalakshmi	Ramanna "Ram"	
2001	Jenu Goodu		
2001	Yuvaraja	Chakri	
2001	Sri Manjunatha		
2002	Shravana Sambrama		
2002	Mutthu		
2002	Aathma		
2002	Kshama		
2002	Halli Yadarenu Shiva		
2002	Nee Modida Mallige		
2004	Kanakambari	Raghava	
2005	Chandana Chiguru		
2006	Nama Samsara Ananda Sagara		
2006	Amma Nagama		
2006	Naranthaka		
2007	Chikka		
2008	Kalyani		
2008	Thaayi		
2008	Sambrama		
2009	Dubai Babu		
2010	Sathya	Sathya	
2011	Bekku		
2011	Preethisi Horatavale		
2015	Master Mind	Mahesh	
2015	Rudra Tandava	Nagaraj	
2016	Mooka Nayaka		
2023	Kaatera	Mahadevanna	
