= Damini (actress) =

Indian actress

- Occupation: Actress
- Years active: 1999–2009
- Notable work: Upendra (1999)

Damini is a former Indian actress, who worked predominantly in Kannada-language films, who was known for her role in the film Upendra (1999).

== Career ==
Damini made her debut with Upendra (1999) directed by Upendra. Critics were polarised on her role with one feeling that "shines as the debutant girl" whilst another cited her as "adequate". Regarding her performance in Asura (2001) co-starring Shiva Rajkumar, critics felt that she gave a good performance. Her career declined after acting in B-grade films.

She played the guest role of a mother in Bimba (2004). She played the glamorous role of a model in Good Luck (2006) alongside Radhika. Her last role was in Swathanthra Palya (2009) directed by Huccha Venkat.

== Filmography ==
Year	Title	Role	Notes
1999	Upendra	Rathi	
2000	Swalpa Adjust Madkolli		
2001	Vande Matharam	Citizen rights council member	
2001	Asura	Mohana	
2001	Halu Sakkare		
2001	Mr. Harishchandra		
2001	Amma Nagamma		
2001	Chitte		
2002	Punjabi House		
2002	Love U		
2002	Hatthura Odeya		
2003	Ree Swalpa Bartheera		
2004	Bimba	Mother	
2005	Kadhal Seiya Virumbu	Nithika	Tamil film; credited as Srisha
2006	Chelvi		
2006	Bharathi		
2006	Good Luck	Sheeba	
2006	Hatavadi		
2007	VIP 5	Jyothi	
2008	Navashakthi Vaibhava		
2009	Swathanthra Palya		
