= Vaachalam =

- Directed by: Biju Varkey
- Starring: Manoj K. Jayan; Thilakan; KPAC Lalitha; Nedumudi Venu
- Music by: Johnson
- Production company: Aswakarthy Films
- Distributed by: Aswakarthy Films
- Release date: 1997
- Country: India
- Language: Malayalam

Vaachalam is a 1997 Indian Malayalam language film, directed by Biju Varkey. The film stars Manoj K. Jayan, Thilakan, KPAC Lalitha and Nedumudi Venu. The film has musical score by Johnson.

== Cast ==
- Manoj K. Jayan as Sekharankutty
- Maathu as Meenakshi
- Gautami as Radha
- KPAC Lalitha as Vilasini
- Shiju as Vinod
- Nedumudi Venu as Mashu
- Kamalroy as Kuttan
- Kalabhavan Mani as Appukuttan
- Thilakan as Ashan
- Aboobacker as Narayanan
- Indrans as Vasu
- Cherthala Lalitha as Radha's mother
- Salu Kuttanadu as Balloon seller

== Soundtrack ==
The music was composed by Johnson.

No.	Song	Singers	Lyrics	Length (m:ss)
1	"Aathmaavil Thengunnallo"	K. J. Yesudas	Kaithapram	
2	"Kannaadiyaattil"	Chorus, Minmini	Kaithapram	
3	"Mindanda Mindanda"	C. O. Anto, Krishnachandran, Babu	Kaithapram	
4	"Paraagamaay Pozhiyunnu"	K. J. Yesudas, K. S. Chithra	Kaithapram	
5	"Paraagamaay Pozhiyunnu"	K. S. Chithra	Kaithapram	
