= Vinod Raj =

Indian Kannada actor

- Born: Vinod; July 5, 1967 (age 59); Chennai, India
- Occupations: Actor; dancer; singer
- Mother: Leelavathi

Vinod Raj is an Indian actor known for his work in Kannada cinema. He worked with actors such as Ambareesh, Arjun Sarja, Ramesh Arvind, Srinivas Murthy.

In 2009, he released his album named Bhaktanjali, which consists of devotional songs. Vinod Raj has performed vocals for some of the movies he has worked in. He once asserted that Michael Jackson was his inspiration for both singing and dancing.

== Personal life ==
Vinod Raj is the son of the acclaimed Indian actress Leelavathi.

== Career ==
One of the songs from the Kannada film Dance Raja Dance was later featured on the radio station Radio Del Mundo in the video game Grand Theft Auto: Liberty City Stories. After working in other fields, Vinod Raj continued working in the Kannada film industry.

Apart from films, Vinod Raj has been involved in several social initiatives. He has taken part in civic work such as repairing potholes on roads across Karnataka.

He has also participated in charitable activities along with his mother, actress Leelavathi, including donating groceries for junior artists in the Kannada film industry.

== Filmography ==
=== Film ===
- Dance Raja Dance (1987)
- Sri Venkateshwara Mahime (1988)
- Krishna Nee Kunidaga (1989)
- College Hero (1990)
- Nanagu Hendthi Beku (1991)
- Yuddha Parva (1991)
- Nayaka (1991)
- Banni Ondsala Nodi (1992)
- Gili Bete(1992)
- Nanjunda (1993)
- Captain (1993)
- Bombat Raja Bandal Rani (1995)
- Rambha Rajyadalli Rowdy (1995)
- Mahabharatha (1997)
- Raajanna (1999)
- Dalavayi (1999)
- Snehaloka (1999)
- Om Shakthi (1999)
- Brahma Vishnu (2001)
- Vande Mataram (2001)
- Rashtrageethe (2001
- Sri Manjunatha (2001)
- Namma Samsara Ananda Sagara (2001)
- Pandava (2004)
- Kannadada Kanda (2006)
- Shukra (2007)
- Yaaradu (2009)

=== Television ===
- Rock n Roll (judge)
- Weekend with Ramesh
