= Vande Matharam (2001 film) =

2001 film by Om Prakash

- Directed by: Om Prakash
- Written by: M. S. Ramesh; R. Rajashekhar; (Dialogues)
- Screenplay by: Om Prakash
- Story by: J. K. Bharavi
- Produced by: B. Jayasridevi
- Starring: Ambareesh; Vijayashanti
- Cinematography: T. Janardhan
- Edited by: Manohar
- Music by: Deva
- Production company: Chinni Films
- Distributed by: Bahar Films
- Release date: 5 January 2001
- Running time: 144 minutes
- Country: India
- Language: Kannada

Vande Matharam (transl. Mother, I bow to thee) is a 2001 Kannada-language film directed Om Prakash and written by J. K. Bharavi. It stars Ambareesh and Vijayashanti. Deva composed the music for the film.

== Cast ==
- Ambareesh as CBI Officer Yashwanth
- Vijayashanti as DCP Gayatri Brahmavar
- Girish Karnad as Gayatri's father
- Ashish Vidhyarthi as Major Sujan
- Qaisar Shurza
- Kiran Kumar
- Kazan Khan as Inspector Deva
- Sunil Raoh as Abhishek, Gayatri's brother
- Vinod Raj as Citizen rights council member
- Kumar Govind as Citizen rights council member
- Harish as Citizen rights council member
- Sumanth as Citizen rights council member
- Ravi Teja as Citizen rights council member
- Anand as Citizen rights council member
- Brahmaji as Citizen rights council member
- Akhila as Citizen rights council member
- Damini as Citizen rights council member
- Reethu Singh as Citizen rights council member
- Shivaram
- Avinash
- Ayyappa
- Tiptur Raghu
- Meena
- Sailaja
- Maina Chandru
- Padma Kumata
- Sathyajith as a police officer
- Karibasavaiah
- Dheerendra Gopal

== Production ==
The film was planned to be shot in Kannada, Telugu, and Tamil, but the film was later made only in Kannada with a Telugu dubbed version.

== Soundtrack ==
Soundtrack was composed by Deva.

- "No Problem" - Srinivas, Krishnaraj, Swarnalatha
- "Sandal Wood Huduga" - P. Unnikrishnan, Swarnalatha
- "Ma Thujhe Salam" - Gangadhar, Krishnaraj
- "Hindusthana Gottheno" - SPB
- "Thayya Thakka Tha" - Krishnaraj, Unnikrishnan, Anuradha Sriram
- "Bisi Nettharu" - K. S. Chithra

== Release and reception ==
The film released on January 5, 2001. The film was dubbed in Telugu with the same name. The Telugu dubbed version released on 12 October 2001.

Regarding the Telugu dubbed version, Gudipoodi Srihari of The Hindu noted that the "role of Gayatri is well portrayed by Vijaya Shanti" and that Ambarish "does justice to his role".
