= Mimicry Rajagopal =

Indian actor and film comedian (c.1951–2020)

- Born: c. 1951
- Died: January 1, 2020 (aged 68–69); Bangalore, India
- Occupations: Actor, Film comedian
- Years active: 1983–2020

Rajagopal (c. 1951 – 1 July 2020), nicknamed as Mimicry Rajagopal, was an Indian actor and film comedian known for his mimicry skills and comedic roles in Kannada and Tamil cinema. He primarily acted in Kannada films and was associated with the Indian film industry since 1983. He appeared in more than six hundred films, including in Real Police, Goosi Gang, Sadakaru, and Super Police.

== Biography ==
Besides appearing in films, he also appeared in several DD National's television serials throughout his career. He was also known for copying an Indian actress Kalpana. He died of kidney and lung diseases at his residence in Kengeri, Bangalore. He had three daughters. His prominent films include Chinnari Mutha, Vaalee, and Care of Footpath.
