= Tula Pahate Re =

2018 Indian Marathi language TV series

- Genre: Thriller; Romance
- Directed by: Girish Mohite; Chandrakant Gaikwad
- Starring: See below
- Voices of: Aarya Ambekar
- Composer: Ashok Patki
- Country of origin: India
- Original language: Marathi
- No. of episodes: 298

Production
- Producers: Aparna Ketkar; Atul Ketkar
- Production locations: Mumbai, Maharashtra
- Camera setup: Multi-camera
- Running time: 22 minutes
- Production company: Right Click Media Solutions

Original release
- Network: Zee Marathi
- Release: 13 August 2018 – 20 July 2019

Tula Pahate Re (transl. I Look At You) is an Indian Marathi language television series which aired on Zee Marathi. It is directed by Girish Mohite and Chandrakant Gaikwad and produced by Aparna Ketkar and Atul Ketkar under the banner of Right Click Media Solutions. It starred Subodh Bhave and Gayatri Datar in lead roles. It premiered from 13 August 2018 by replacing Tuza Maza Breakup.

== Plot ==
Isha Nimkar is a sober middle-class girl living in a chawl with her parents. One day, she has to deliver a speech at the "K.T. College" honouring the chief guest Vikrant Saranjame, a wealthy industrialist of the "Saranjame Group of Industries" who lives with his widowed mother Snehalata a.k.a. Aaisaheb, younger brother Jaydeep and arrogant sister-in-law Soniya in a large mansion in Karjat, Maharashtra. Due to his fame and greatness, Vikrant has become a dear public figure surrounded by many people, including his close friend Vilas Zende, who is also his personal assistant.

Also, Isha's father Arun Nimkar works in one of the shops of "Rajnandini Sarees", the department of sarees, which is owned by Vikrant. On his way to the college, Vikrant's bicycle breaks down and thus he shares an auto-rickshaw with Isha when he meets her for the first time. Isha does not recognize Vikrant in the auto-rickshaw and speaks rudely to him for having money to pay, although she pays the fare of him too. Later at the college, Isha is shocked to see Vikrant entering as the chief guest and bursts into tears. Due to this commotion, she forgets her speech that lists many accomplishments of Vikrant, which leads to all her college friends teasing her.

However, Vikrant defends Isha by advising her and her college friends to always have trust in themselves and each other in any situation, and also gains Isha's trust by handing her over a blank cheque. Despite this, Isha and Mr. Nimkar modestly decide to return the blank cheque to Vikrant against the wishes of Isha's mother Pushpa. The next day, Isha takes the envelope containing Vikrant's cheque to his office and hands it over to his secretary Myra Karkhanis. However, Myra is shocked to discover that the envelope is empty and humiliates Isha for being after a rich personality under some pretext.

Meanwhile, Vikrant reaches Isha's house to return her money from the auto-rickshaw fare, but Pushpa misunderstands him for the fridge repairer and tries to make him repair the fridge. Later, Isha meets Mr. Nimkar and they learn that Pushpa has gone to deposit Vikrant's cheque in the bank. Just as Pushpa is about to fill in the amount on the cheque, Isha and Mr. Nimkar intervene and refuse to let her do so. Pushpa then apologises to Vikrant after learning about his true identity from Isha. Also, Isha and Mr. Nimkar return the cheque to Vikrant and request him to keep it.

Further, Vikrant falls in love with Isha and offers her a job in his company. As time passes, Isha begins to develop feelings for Vikrant too, while Myra and Zende try to separate the lovebirds due to the fact that she also loves Vikrant. However, Myra and Zende's each plan backfires and Vikrant invites Isha to his mansion. While there, he reveals her the truth about his deceased wife named "Rajnandini", whom he loved a lot and whose sudden demise had left him much disturbed. Therefore, he named the department of "Rajnandini Sarees" in the memory of his late wife.

Upon learning this, Isha despises Vikrant for hiding this from her and storms off, but it turns out to be just a prank. Actually, Isha has forgiven Vikrant for respecting her while telling her all this. Later, Vikrant takes Isha for a helicopter ride and proposes marriage to her mid-air. Speechless on seeing his unique way of proposing marriage, Isha agrees to marry Vikrant but the couple faces opposition from Mr. Nimkar due to their age difference, although Pushpa agrees for their relationship. With support from Zende, Aaisaheb and Pushpa, Vikrant and Isha eventually manage to convince Mr. Nimkar and have a grand marriage ceremony under Myra and Zende's organisation.

After their marriage, things unexpectedly start changing when the audience sees a dark side of Vikrant and Zende. It is suddenly revealed that Vikrant's late father Dadasaheb has stated in his will that he can never inherit the Saranjame property and that Rajnandini is the real owner of it. Therefore, Vikrant married Isha to use her as a pawn to obtain the Saranjame property. Following his plan, Vikrant tries to pretend that Isha is "reincarnation" of Rajnandini, so that Aaisaheb and Jaydeep (who are the current owners of the Saranjame property) can easily transfer the Saranjame property to Isha.

After a couple of months, Isha discovers an ongoing fraud in the Saranjame company and the name of the fraudster is revealed to be "Gajendra Patil". Upon learning this, Vikrant and Zende mysteriously make an actor take the blame of being the fraudster and have him arrested by the police. However, Isha goes on to visit the election commission office to enrol Vikrant's name in the voting list, where she is stunned to see the name "Gajendra Patil" with Vikrant's photograph. At the same time, she shockingly learns from Jaydeep and Soniya that Rajnandini was actually Aaisaheb's stepdaughter and Jaydeep's stepsister, and that Vikrant was the son-in-law of Dadasaheb who made him change his last name to Saranjame.

Also, Jalindar Mane, an archenemy of Vikrant, confesses about his true identity and colours to Isha soon after he is released from prison. Having become sure of Vikrant's deception, a devastated Isha meets the Jogtin, a woman asking for alms, and wishes to find the purpose of her life from the Goddess Ambabai. At this point, the beautiful face of a mysterious woman is reflected back upon Isha from the divine plate of water. Eventually, a confused and heartbroken Isha confronts Vikrant over his true identity and Rajnandini's relationship with Aaisaheb and Jaydeep. However, Vikrant regains Isha's trust by narrating her a fake story of the past involving him and Rajnandini.

Further, Vikrant takes Isha to a private room of him in the Saranjame mansion, where all of Rajnandini's belongings are kept safely by him as souvenirs along with Dadasaheb's photograph. He goes on to uncover the large photograph of Rajnandini in the room before Isha. Isha is horrified to recognize Rajnandini as the mysterious woman whose beautiful face was reflected upon her from the divine plate of water. Due to the shock, Isha falls unconscious in the room itself and all of Rajnandini's life events miraculously flash past her eyes in her unconsciousness.

A flashback shows that the middle-aged Rajnandini lived happily in the mansion with Aaisaheb, a young Jaydeep and Dadasaheb. One day, her car breaks down on her way to an important meeting with Jalindar at his office. Thus, Rajnandini shares an auto-rickshaw with Gajendra Patil (Vikrant), an orphan who lives in a chawl with his childhood friend Zende. Gajendra is educated but unemployed while Zende is a street-smart boy who can easily fool people. Gajendra is revealed to be going to the same destination for an interview with Jalindar and falls in love with Rajnandini due to her richness.

After the two reach their destination, Gajendra intervenes during Rajnandini and Jalindar's meeting and gives his interview to Jalindar before Rajnandini. An unimpressed Jalindar initially rejects Gajendra due to his low percentage of marks. However, Gajendra is ultimately selected in Jalindar's company on the recommendation of Rajnandini, who was impressed with his attitude during the interview. As time passes, Rajnandini falls in love with Gajendra too and he eventually proposes marriage to her.

Despite Dadasaheb's hesitance to approval, Rajnandini marries Gajendra in a temple and rechristens him as "Vikrant" after the name of the male protagonist in the book titled Tula Pahate Re that Aaisaheb had gifted to her on her birthday. Rajnandini even recruits "Vikrant" as the heir to the Saranjame company, much to everyone's puzzlement. However, Jalindar hands over all the evidences against Vikrant and Zende to Dadasaheb, who disowns Vikrant through an intense insult in private and secretly changes his will. An offended Vikrant immediately retaliates by arranging Dadasaheb to be killed in the consumption of wrong medicine.

Further, Vikrant also changes Dadasaheb's postmortem reports and secretly holds Aaisaheb responsible for his sudden demise. Meanwhile, Jalindar tries to tell Rajnandini the truth by meeting her in private but she refuses to believe him. Now, Vikrant has Zende kill Jalindar's own employee named Shivpurkar and frames Jalindar for the murder, causing Jalindar to be arrested by the police. Also, Vikrant and Zende prohibit the late Dadasaheb's photograph from the office. However, things change when Rajnandini visits the office and learns about Vikrant's new rule about Dadasaheb's photograph.

On this development, Rajnandini goes to meet Jalindar in prison where he confesses about Vikrant's true colours to her. Moreover, Rajnandini has a microphone fixed in Vikrant's office cabin to expose his truth. As a result, all the conspiracies of Vikrant and Zende are recorded in the microphone. Upon receiving this proof, Rajnandini regrets her blind faith in Vikrant before meeting him in private on the mansion terrace, where she threatens to hand over all the evidences against him to the police. However, a miserable Vikrant mercilessly forced Rajnandini off the terrace to her unfortunate end on the fateful night.

The story catches up to the present where a horrified Isha wakes up to have a gut feeling that she is indeed the "reincarnation" of Rajnandini who has descended back to the Earth to seek revenge from Vikrant. The next day, while wandering aimlessly, Isha ends up at her maternal home where she does not hesitate to inform her parents about this development. Mr. Nimkar believes her to have some sort of mental illness and consults her a psychiatrist. However, Isha stands firm by citing her undying commitment to the purpose of her life.

That evening, Isha returns to the Saranjame mansion where she hallucinates the image of Rajnandini, who confides in Isha that she is her reincarnation. On this ground, Isha vows to punish Vikrant and Zende for the injustice they have served to the society. Isha goes on to confess about her true identity with Vikrant and Zende's conspiracies to Jaydeep and Aaisaheb, who both fall into an emotional trap and instantly accept her as Rajnandini. The three plan to avenge both Dadasaheb and Rajnandini's deaths along with Jalindar and Myra by making Vikrant and Zende realise their mistakes.

As part of her mission, Isha cleverly creates a rift between Vikrant and Zende due to the fact that Zende has grown suspicious of her true identity and tries to inform Vikrant about it multiple times. However, Vikrant refuses to believe Zende despite his numerous attempts to convince him. Eventually, Zende conspires to have Isha killed by his henchmen, but Vikrant intervenes and has himself accidentally shot in his arm by one of Zende's henchmen. In these circumstances, Isha considers calling off the mission due to the fact that she is also pregnant with Vikrant's child. Meanwhile, Zende has his henchmen abduct an unconscious Vikrant from the Saranjame mansion and bring him to his own house to settle the issue.

While there, Vikrant regains consciousness and Zende desperately tries to explain him the situation once again but in vain. In a last attempt to take Vikrant into confidence, Zende summons Jalindar to his house where he confronts Jalindar before Vikrant over being the accomplice of Isha in her conspiracy to seek revenge from them both. However, Jalindar silently commits suicide by consuming poison and confesses to Vikrant that Isha loves him a lot before he dies. At last, a furious Vikrant believes that Zende has betrayed him and their friendship and returns home after he shockingly shoots down Zende fatally with his gun.

Despite this, Vikrant eventually discovers the truth with the help of the confession about Isha being the reincarnation of Rajnandini that Mr. Nimkar had unconsciously made to him during a private conversation between them in the office. A regretful Vikrant laments his mistake of killing his true friend Zende and vows to teach a lesson to all the avengers who are plotting against him. In the meantime, Isha realises that Vikrant can blow her cover on benefit of doubt and decides to fight back with a strong heart, much to Aaisaheb and Jaydeep's gratitude.

The next morning, Isha appears before Vikrant in Rajnandini's clothes and recounts all her life events. She demands an explanation from Vikrant on why he served this injustice to the innocent Rajnandini when she had given him all that he wanted. Seeing no other way out, a brainwashed Vikrant finally admits before Isha, her parents, Aaisaheb, Jaydeep, Soniya and Myra that he did all this only to get rid of the sufferings from poverty which had caused his mother's desert. However, he carelessly taunts everyone that they cannot convict him for his crimes for not having any evidence for doing so.

Later that night, Vikrant contacts Isha and mysteriously asks her to come to the terrace. As Isha heads off, Aaisaheb is tremendously worried that Vikrant might do the same thing with Isha that he did with Rajnandini. On the terrace, Vikrant asks Isha what love means to her, to which, Isha replies that she understood the meaning of love only from him. At the same time, Vikrant also confesses that he still truly loves her despite the fact that she betrayed him and went against him, and that he killed his close friend Zende only out of his immortal love for her.

Despite this, the series has a shocking and tragic climax when out of a sudden, Vikrant unexpectedly jumps off the terrace and meets his death as he is unable to deal with his guilt, causing a lot of devastation to Isha. In the end, Isha bids farewell to Aaisaheb, Jaydeep and Soniya and leaves the Saranjame mansion with her parents for wanting to live her true-self, "Isha Nimkar", stating that the soul of Rajnandini has finally attained peace due to the death of her killer, Vikrant. The series ends with Isha and her parents having started a catering business from their chawl few months later.

== Cast ==
=== Main ===
- Subodh Bhave as Vikrant Saranjame / Gajendra Raghu Patil (Gaja)
- Gayatri Datar as Isha Arun Nimkar / Isha Vikrant Saranjame
- Shilpa Tulaskar as Rajnandini Saranjame / Rajnandini Gajendra Patil

=== Recurring ===
Saranjame family

- Anil Khopkar as Dadasaheb Saranjame
- Vidya Karanjikar as Snehalata Saranjame (Aaisaheb)
- Ashutosh Gokhale as Jaydeep Saranjame
  - Malhar Bhave as young Jaydeep
- Purniema Dey-Demanna as Soniya Jaydeep Saranjame

Others

- Umesh Jagtap as Vilas Zende
- Abhidnya Bhave as Myra Karkhanis
- Mohiniraj Gatne as Arun Nimkar
- Gargi Phule-Thatte as Pushpa Arun Nimkar
- Sonal Pawar as Rupali
- Prathamesh Deshpande as Bipin Tillu
- Chitra Gadgil as Ranjana
- Ravindra Kulkarni as Mr. Tillu
- Ashok Sawant as Sarjerao
- Leena Palekar as Manda
- Leena Padit as Mrs. Wadkar
- Sonali Khatavkar as Sapna
- Kedar Athawale as Mihir
- Satish Joshi as Mr. Paranjape
- Swanand Desai as F.M.
- Urmila Katkar as Jogtin
- Sandesh Jadhav as Jalindar
- Surabhi Bhave-Damle as Pinky
- Bhagyesh Patil as News Reporter
- Raju Bawdekar as Isha's doctor
- Vishwanath Kulkarni as Amit

== Reception ==
=== Special episodes ===
1 hour

- 21 October 2018
- 9 December 2018
- 19 May 2019

2 hours

- 13 January 2019 (Vikrant-Isha's marriage)

=== Ratings ===
| Week | Year | BARC Viewership | | Ref. |
| Week | Year | TRP (TVR) | Rank | Ref. |
|---|---|---|---|---|
| Week 34 | 2018 | 4.4 (7.8) | 4 | |
| Week 35 | 2018 | 5.5 (8.3) | 3 | |
| Week 37 | 2018 | 5.6 (8.0) | 2 | |
| Week 38 | 2018 | 5.1 | 3 | |
| Week 40 | 2018 | 5.1 (9.0) | 2 | |
| Week 41 | 2018 | 4.5 | 4 | |
| Week 42 | 2018 | 5.3 | 2 | |
| Week 43 | 2018 | 6.6 | 1 | |
| Week 44 | 2018 | 7.0 | 3 | |
| Week 45 | 2018 | 5.3 | 2 | |
| Week 46 | 2018 | 6.3 | 2 | |
| Week 47 | 2018 | 5.9 | 2 | |
| Week 48 | 2018 | 6.6 | 2 | |
| Week 49 | 2018 | 5.0 | 3 | |
| Week 50 | 2018 | 6.5 | 2 | |
| Week 51 | 2018 | 5.4 | 3 | |
| Week 52 | 2018 | 4.0 | 5 | |
| Week 1 | 2019 | 5.6 | 2 | |
| Week 2 | 2019 | 7.8 (11.0) | 1 | |
| Week 3 | 2019 | 5.7 | 3 | |
| Week 4 | 2019 | 3.7 | 5 | |
| Week 16 | 2019 | 3.0 | 4 | |
| Week 17 | 2019 | 2.9 | 4 | |
| Week 21 | 2019 | 2.9 | 5 | |
| Week 23 | 2019 | 2.8 | 5 | |
| Week 27 | 2019 | 3.7 | 4 | |
| Week 28 | 2019 | 3.6 | 4 | |
| Week 29 | 2019 | 3.7 | 5 | |

== Awards ==
Zee Marathi Utsav Natyancha Awards 2018
| Category | Recipient | Role |
|---|---|---|
| Best Father | Mohiniraj Gatne | Arun Nimkar |
| Best Character Male | Mohiniraj Gatne | Arun Nimkar |
| Best Mother | Gargi Phule-Thatte | Pushpa Nimkar |
| Best Actor | Subodh Bhave | Vikrant Saranjame |
| Best Family | Nimkar Family | |
| Best Series | Aparna Ketkar, Atul Ketkar | Producer |
| Best Title Song | Ashok Patki | Music Director |
