= Bigg Boss =

Indian reality game show franchise

- India-wide Bigg Boss franchise logo since 2021
- Years: 2004–present

Films and television
- Television series: Bigg Boss (independent language versions and special editions – see below)

Miscellaneous
- Languages: Hindi; Kannada; Bengali; Tamil; Telugu; Marathi; Malayalam
- Produced by: Endemol Shine India (2006–20); Banijay Entertainment (2021–present)
- Based on: Big Brother
- Original network: Jio Star

Bigg Boss is an Indian reality competition television franchise adapted from the original Dutch format Big Brother, created by John de Mol Jr. The show features contestants called "housemates" who live together in a specially constructed house that is isolated from the outside world.

The name "Bigg Boss" is inspired by Big Brother from George Orwell's novel Nineteen Eighty-Four, and the housemates are continuously monitored during their stay in the house by live television cameras as well as personal audio microphones. Throughout the course of the competition, they are voted out of the house (usually on a weekly basis) until only one remains and wins the cash prize.

Bigg Boss has had a significant cultural impact in India, influencing television trends and the concept of celebrity. The show is known for its drama, emotional moments, and the intense interactions between housemates. Various celebrities and public figures have participated in the show, further adding to its appeal. As of July 2025, multiple seasons of Bigg Boss have aired across different Indian languages, including Hindi, Kannada, Bengali, Tamil, Telugu, Marathi, and Malayalam. The editions, in particular, is widely recognized and often referred to by its initials BB.

== Overview ==
There have been seven versions of the show in different languages spoken in the Indian subcontinent. The first show of the franchise was Bigg Boss in Hindi, which debuted in 2006 through Sony TV, and from season two onwards it moved to and continues on Colors TV. In 2013, the franchise extended its presence in Kannada through Colors Kannada and Bengali through ETV Bangla, later rebranded as Colors Bangla. In 2017, it extended its presence in Tamil through Star Vijay and in Telugu through Star Maa. In 2018, it ventured into Marathi through Colors Marathi and into Malayalam through Asianet. After discontinued for 10 years, Bengali version relaunched through Star Jalsha from 2026. The show will expand to Punjabi and Bhojpuri languages in 2027.

Though only celebrities were selected to be as housemates in the initial seasons, members of the general public have been chosen to be on the show in the latest seasons of Hindi, Kannada, Telugu, and Malayalam versions of the show.

List of versions of the show in different languages
Show title	Years	No of seasons	First season	Most recent season	Current host
Bigg Boss Hindi	2006–present	20	2006–07	2026	Salman Khan
Bigg Boss Kannada	2013–present	13	2013	2026	Sudeepa
Bigg Boss Bangla	2013–present	3	2013	2026	Sourav Ganguly
Bigg Boss Tamil	2017–present	10	2017	2026	Vijay Sethupathi
Bigg Boss Telugu	2017–present	10	2017	2026	Nagarjuna
Bigg Boss Marathi	2018–present	6	2018	2026	Ritesh Deshmukh
Bigg Boss Malayalam	2018–present	8	2018	2026	Mohanlal

== Synopsis ==
Contestants called "housemates" live together in a specially constructed house that is isolated from the outside world. Housemates are voted out, usually on a weekly basis, until only one remains and wins the cash prize. During their stay in the house, contestants are continuously monitored by live television cameras as well as personal audio microphones.

The program relies on techniques such as a scripted back-to-basics environment, evictions, weekly tasks, competitions set by Bigg Boss, and the “confession room” where housemates converse with Bigg Boss and nominate the housemates they wish to evict from the house. The housemates with the most nominations are then announced, and viewers are given the opportunity to vote via SMS or online through social media and smartphone applications for the nominee they wish to save from eviction. The last person standing is declared the winner.

The contestants are required to indulge in housework and are assigned tasks by the omnipresent authority figure known to them as Bigg Boss. The tasks are designed to test the teamwork abilities and community spirit of the housemates. The luxury budget is a weekly allowance to buy luxury food items other than the supplied essentials which depend on the outcome of assigned tasks.

== History ==
=== Creation ===
Bigg Boss is a Hindi language adaptation of Big Brother created in Netherlands by John de Mol Jr., largely based on the Celebrity Big Brother model owned by the Endemol Shine Group. The show was named Bigg Boss and a house was constructed for the show at Lonavla for season one to four and six to twelve, in Karjat for season five and in Goregaon from season thirteen onwards. Bigg Boss debuted on television in 2006 through Sony TV with Arshad Warsi as the host. The show gained popularity after Shilpa Shetty emerged as the winner in Big Brother 5 and replaced Warsi as the host in the second season of Bigg Boss. From the second season, the show's broadcast moved to Viacom 18's Colors TV. For third season Amitabh Bachchan hosted the show respectively and Salman Khan continued as a host from fourth season onwards, while Sanjay Dutt also hosted for fifth season along with Salman Khan. Farah Khan hosted the spin off season of eighth season in absence of main host Salman Khan.

=== Expansion ===
The show's acceptance and success among the Indian audience paved way for its expansion into other Indian languages. After the sixth season wrapped in 2013, Kannada and Bengali adaptations were created by Endemol through ETV Network. Sudeep hosted the Kannada version, and Mithun Chakraborty and Jeet hosted the Bengali version. While the Kannada version continued with new seasons annually, similar to Hindi, the Bengali version completed only two seasons in six years and did not turn out to be as successful.

In 2017, upon completion of ten seasons in Hindi, four seasons in Kannada and two seasons in Bengali, Endemol Shine India extended its presence in South India by creating Tamil and Telugu versions of the show with Star India. The Tamil version was hosted by Kamal Haasan, for the first seven seasons and then from Season 8 onwards, Vijay Sethupathi became the host. The while the Telugu version started with Jr NTR as the host, and later for the second season Nani became the host. From the third season onwards Nagarjuna became the host. In 2018, the show was adapted into Marathi under Viacom 18 and hosted by Mahesh Manjrekar later from fifth season Riteish Deshmukh hosted show. The next language adaptation was Malayalam, which was produced by Star India and hosted by Mohanlal. In 2021, another version was adopted called Bigg Boss OTT. Its episodes were shown on Voot later on JioCinema and hosted by Karan Johar, Salman Khan, Anil Kapoor.

In July 2026, JioStar announced that they will air 6 different versions of the show simultaneously starting from September 2026 including the eighth season of the Malayalam version, tenth season of Telugu and Tamil versions, thirteenth season of the Kannada version, and the twentieth season of the Hindi version while they will expand the franchise with the revival of the Bangla version.

== Versions ==
Currently airing – 6
Upcoming for airing – 0
Recently concluded – 1

Language	Show	Season/Year	Official Name	Host(s)	Network(s) (Primary/OTT)	Premiere	Finale	Days	Housemates	Prize Money	Voice of Bigg Boss	House Location	Winner(s)	Runner-Up(s)
Hindi (हिन्दी)	Bigg Boss Hindi	1 (2006–07)	Bigg Boss: Kadi Nazar, Solid Assarr	Arshad Warsi	Sony TV	3 November 2006	26 January 2007	86	15	₹1 crore (US$110,000)	Atul Kapoor	Lonavala, Pune	Rahul Roy	Carol Gracias
Hindi (हिन्दी)	Bigg Boss Hindi	2 (2008)	Bigg Boss 2 - Iss Nazar Se Kaun Bachega	Shilpa Shetty	Colors TV, Voot	17 August 2008	22 November 2008	98	15	₹1 crore (US$110,000)	Atul Kapoor	Lonavala, Pune	Ashutosh Kaushik	Raja Chaudhary
Hindi (हिन्दी)	Bigg Boss Hindi	3 (2009)	Bigg Boss 3 - Tritya	Amitabh Bachchan	Colors TV, Voot	4 October 2009	26 December 2009	85	15	₹1 crore (US$110,000)	Atul Kapoor	Lonavala, Pune	Vindu Dara Singh	Pravesh Rana
Hindi (हिन्दी)	Bigg Boss Hindi	4 (2010–11)	Bigg Boss 4	Salman Khan	Colors TV, Voot	3 October 2010	8 January 2011	96	16	₹1 crore (US$110,000)	Atul Kapoor	Lonavala, Pune	Shweta Tiwari	Dalip Singh Rana aka The Great Khali
Hindi (हिन्दी)	Bigg Boss Hindi	5 (2011–12)	Bigg Boss 5: Five-Five! Five-Five! Five-Five!	Sanjay Dutt Salman Khan	Colors TV, Voot	2 October 2011	7 January 2012	98	18	₹1 crore (US$110,000)	Atul Kapoor	ND Studios, Karjat	Juhi Parmar	Mahek Chahal
Hindi (हिन्दी)	Bigg Boss Hindi	6 (2012–13)	Bigg Boss 6: Alag Che	Salman Khan	Colors TV, Voot	7 October 2012	12 January 2013	97	19	₹50 lakh (US$53,000)	Atul Kapoor	Lonavala, Pune	Urvashi Dholakia	Imam Siddique
Hindi (हिन्दी)	Bigg Boss Hindi	7 (2013)	Bigg Boss 7: Saath Saat	Salman Khan	Colors TV, Voot	15 September 2013	28 December 2013	105	20	₹50 lakh (US$53,000)	Atul Kapoor	Lonavala, Pune	Gauahar Khan	Tanishaa Mukerji
Hindi (हिन्दी)	Bigg Boss Hindi	8 (2014–15)	Bigg Boss 8: Sabki Lagegi Waat!	Salman Khan	Colors TV, Voot	21 September 2014	3 January 2015	105	19	₹50 lakh (US$53,000)	Atul Kapoor	Lonavala, Pune	Season extended; Declared in Halla Bol	
Hindi (हिन्दी)	Bigg Boss Hindi	Spin-off (2015)	Bigg Boss Halla Bol	Farah Khan	Colors TV, Voot	3 January 2015	31 January 2015	28	10	₹50 lakh (US$53,000)	Atul Kapoor	Lonavala, Pune	Gautam Gulati	Karishma Tanna
Hindi (हिन्दी)	Bigg Boss Hindi	9 (2015–16)	Bigg Boss 9: Double Trouble	Salman Khan	Colors TV, Voot	11 October 2015	23 January 2016	105	20	₹50 lakh (US$53,000)	Atul Kapoor	Lonavala, Pune	Prince Narula	Rishabh Sinha
Hindi (हिन्दी)	Bigg Boss Hindi	10 (2016–17)	Bigg Boss 10: India Isse Apna Hi Ghar Samjho	Salman Khan	Colors TV, Voot	16 October 2016	28 January 2017	105	18	₹50 lakh (US$53,000)	Atul Kapoor	Lonavala, Pune	Manveer Gurjar	Bani Judge
Hindi (हिन्दी)	Bigg Boss Hindi	11 (2017–18)	Bigg Boss 11: Padosi Bajayenge Barah	Salman Khan	Colors TV, Voot	1 October 2017	14 January 2018	105	19	₹44 lakh (US$47,000)	Atul Kapoor	Lonavala, Pune	Shilpa Shinde	Hina Khan
Hindi (हिन्दी)	Bigg Boss Hindi	12 (2018)	Bigg Boss 12: Vichitra Jodis	Salman Khan	Colors TV, Voot	16 September 2018	30 December 2018	105	21	₹30 lakh (US$32,000)	Atul Kapoor	Lonavala, Pune	Dipika Kakar	S. Sreesanth
Hindi (हिन्दी)	Bigg Boss Hindi	13 (2019–20)	Bigg Boss 13: Tedah	Salman Khan	Colors TV, Voot	29 September 2019	15 February 2020	140	21	₹50 lakh (US$53,000)	Atul Kapoor	Film City, Mumbai	Sidharth Shukla	Asim Riaz
Hindi (हिन्दी)	Bigg Boss Hindi	14 (2020–21)	Bigg Boss 14: Ab Scene Paltega	Salman Khan	Colors TV, Voot (24/7 Live Stream)	3 October 2020	21 February 2021	140	22	₹36 lakh (US$38,000)	Atul Kapoor	Film City, Mumbai	Rubina Dilaik	Rahul Vaidya
Hindi (हिन्दी)	Bigg Boss Hindi	15 (2021–22)	Bigg Boss 15: Sankat in Jungle	Salman Khan	Colors TV, Voot (24/7 Live Stream)	2 October 2021	30 January 2022	119	24	₹40 lakh (US$43,000)	Atul Kapoor	Film City, Mumbai	Tejasswi Prakash	Pratik Sehajpal
Hindi (हिन्दी)	Bigg Boss Hindi	16 (2022–23)	Bigg Boss 16: Game Badlega, Kyunki Bigg Boss Khud Khelega	Salman Khan	Colors TV, Voot (24/7 Live Stream)	1 October 2022	12 February 2023	133	17	₹31.8 lakh (US$34,000)	Atul Kapoor	Film City, Mumbai	MC Stan	Shiv Thakare
Hindi (हिन्दी)	Bigg Boss Hindi	17 (2023–24)	Bigg Boss 17: Dil, Dimaag Aur Dum Ka Game	Salman Khan	Colors TV, JioCinema (24/7 Live Stream)	15 October 2023	28 January 2024	105	21	₹50 lakh (US$53,000)	Atul Kapoor	Film City, Mumbai	Munawar Faruqui	Abhishek Kumar
Hindi (हिन्दी)	Bigg Boss Hindi	18 (2024–25)	Bigg Boss 18: Time Ka Tandav	Salman Khan	Colors TV, JioCinema (24/7 Live Stream)	6 October 2024	19 January 2025	105	23	₹50 lakh (US$53,000)	Atul Kapoor	Film City, Mumbai	Karan Veer Mehra	Vivian Dsena
Hindi (हिन्दी)	Bigg Boss Hindi	19 (2025)	Bigg Boss 19: Iss Baar Chalegi Gharwalon Ki Sarkaar	Salman Khan	Colors TV, JioHotstar (24/7 Live Stream)	24 August 2025	7 December 2025	105	18	₹50 lakh (US$53,000)	Atul Kapoor	Film City, Mumbai	Gaurav Khanna	Farrhana Bhatt
Hindi (हिन्दी)	Bigg Boss Hindi	20 (2026)	Bigg Boss 20: Tathas-two	Salman Khan	Colors TV, JioHotstar (24/7 Live Stream)	6 September 2026	TBA	TBA	18	₹50 lakh (US$53,000)	Atul Kapoor	Film City, Mumbai	TBA	TBA
Hindi (हिन्दी)	Bigg Boss OTT	1 (2021)	Bigg Boss Over-the-Top	Karan Johar	Voot (24/7 Live Stream)	8 August 2021	18 September 2021	42	13	₹25 lakh (US$27,000)	Atul Kapoor	Film City, Mumbai	Divya Agarwal	Nishant Bhat
Hindi (हिन्दी)	Bigg Boss OTT	2 (2023)	Bigg Boss Over-the-Top 2	Salman Khan	JioCinema (24/7 Live Stream)	17 June 2023	14 August 2023	56	15	₹25 lakh (US$27,000)	Atul Kapoor	Film City, Mumbai	Elvish Yadav	Abhishek Malhan
Hindi (हिन्दी)	Bigg Boss OTT	3 (2024)	Bigg Boss Over-the-Top 3	Anil Kapoor	JioCinema (24/7 Live Stream)	21 June 2024	2 August 2024	42	17	₹25 lakh (US$27,000)	Atul Kapoor	Film City, Mumbai	Sana Makbul	Naezy
Kannada (ಕನ್ನಡ)	Bigg Boss; Kannada	1 (2013)	Bigg Boss	Sudeep	ETV Kannada	24 March 2013	30 June 2013	98	15	₹50 lakh (US$53,000)	Amit Bhargav	Lonavala, Pune	Vijay Raghavendra	Arun Sagar
Kannada (ಕನ್ನಡ)	Bigg Boss; Kannada	2 (2014)	Bigg Boss 2	Sudeep	Asianet Suvarna	29 June 2014	5 October 2014	98	15	₹50 lakh (US$53,000)	Amit Bhargav	Lonavala, Pune	Akul Balaji	Srujan Lokesh
Kannada (ಕನ್ನಡ)	Bigg Boss; Kannada	3 (2015–16)	Bigg Boss 3	Sudeep	Colors Kannada, Voot	25 October 2015	31 January 2016	98	18	₹50 lakh (US$53,000)	B M Venkatesh	Innovative Film City, Bengaluru	Shruti	Chandan Kumar
Kannada (ಕನ್ನಡ)	Bigg Boss; Kannada	4 (2016–17)	Bigg Boss 4	Sudeep	Colors Kannada, Voot	9 October 2016	29 January 2017	112	18	₹50 lakh (US$53,000)	Srinivas Prasad	Innovative Film City, Bengaluru	Pratham	Keerthi Kumar
Kannada (ಕನ್ನಡ)	Bigg Boss; Kannada	5 (2017–18)	Bigg Boss 5	Sudeep	Colors Super, Voot	15 October 2017	28 January 2018	105	19	₹50 lakh (US$53,000)	Srinivas Prasad	Innovative Film City, Bengaluru	Chandan Shetty	Diwakar
Kannada (ಕನ್ನಡ)	Bigg Boss; Kannada	6 (2018–19)	Bigg Boss 6	Sudeep	Colors Super, Voot	21 October 2018	27 January 2019	98	20	₹50 lakh (US$53,000)	Srinivas Prasad	Innovative Film City, Bengaluru	Shashi Kumar	Naveen Sajju
Kannada (ಕನ್ನಡ)	Bigg Boss; Kannada	7 (2019–20)	Bigg Boss 7	Sudeep	Colors Kannada, Voot	13 October 2019	2 February 2020	112	20	₹50 lakh (US$53,000)	Srinivas Prasad	Innovative Film City, Bengaluru	Shine Shetty	Kuri Prathap
Kannada (ಕನ್ನಡ)	Bigg Boss; Kannada	8 (2021)	Bigg Boss 8	Sudeep	Colors Kannada, Voot (24/7 Live Stream)	28 February 2021	9 May 2021	70	20	₹50 lakh (US$53,000)	Srinivas Prasad	Innovative Film City, Bengaluru	Cancelled due to the COVID-19 pandemic	
Kannada (ಕನ್ನಡ)	Bigg Boss; Kannada	8 (2021)	Bigg Boss 8: Second Innings	Sudeep	Colors Kannada, Voot (24/7 Live Stream)	23 June 2021	8 August 2021	47	12	₹50 lakh (US$53,000)	Srinivas Prasad	Innovative Film City, Bengaluru	Manju Pavagada	Aravind KP
Kannada (ಕನ್ನಡ)	Bigg Boss; Kannada	Spin-off (2021)	Bigg Boss Mini Season	Sudeep	Colors Kannada, Voot	14 August 2021	5 September 2021	6	15	—N/a	Srinivas Prasad	Innovative Film City, Bengaluru	This season contains No Winner	
Kannada (ಕನ್ನಡ)	Bigg Boss; Kannada	9 (2022)	Bigg Boss 9	Sudeep	Colors Kannada, Voot (24/7 Live Stream)	24 September 2022	31 December 2022	98	18	₹50 lakh (US$53,000)	Srinivas Prasad	Innovative Film City, Bengaluru	Roopesh Shetty	Rakesh Adiga
Kannada (ಕನ್ನಡ)	Bigg Boss; Kannada	10 (2023–24)	Bigg Boss 10: Happy Bigg Boss	Sudeep	Colors Kannada, JioCinema (24/7 Live Stream)	8 October 2023	28 January 2024	112	21	₹50 lakh (US$53,000)	Srinivas Prasad	Ramohalli, Bengaluru	Karthik Mahesh	Drone Prathap
Kannada (ಕನ್ನಡ)	Bigg Boss; Kannada	11 (2024–25)	Bigg Boss 11: Svarga - Naraka	Sudeep	Colors Kannada, JioCinema	29 September 2024	26 January 2025	119	20	₹50 lakh (US$53,000)	Srinivas Prasad	Ramohalli, Bengaluru	Hanumantha Lamani	Trivikram Srinivas
Kannada (ಕನ್ನಡ)	Bigg Boss; Kannada	12 (2025–26)	Bigg Boss 12	Sudeep	Colors Kannada, JioHotstar (24/7 Live Stream)	28 September 2025	18 January 2026	112	24	₹50 lakh (US$53,000)	Srinivas Prasad	Innovative Film City, Bengaluru	Gilli Nata	Rakshitha Shetty
Kannada (ಕನ್ನಡ)	Bigg Boss; Kannada	13 (2026–27)	Bigg Boss 13	Sudeep	Colors Kannada, JioHotstar (24/7 Live Stream)	6 September 2026	TBA	TBA	16	₹50 lakh (US$53,000)	Srinivas Prasad	Innovative Film City, Bengaluru	TBA	TBA
Kannada (ಕನ್ನಡ)	Bigg Boss OTT	1 (2022)	Bigg Boss OTT	Sudeep	Voot (24/7 Live Stream)	6 August 2022	16 September 2022	42	16	₹5 lakh (US$5,300)	Srinivas Prasad	Innovative Film City, Bengaluru	Roopesh Shetty	—N/a
Kannada (ಕನ್ನಡ)	Bigg Boss Agniparikshe	1 (2026)	Bigg Boss: Agniparikshe	Niranjan Deshpande	Colors Kannada, JioHotstar	16 August 2026	5 September 2026	21	60	—N/a	—N/a	Innovative Film City, Bengaluru	Selected contestants moved to Season 13	
Bengali (বাংলা)	Bigg Boss; Bangla	1 (2013)	Bigg Boss	Mithun Chakraborty	Colors Bangla, Voot	17 June 2013	14 September 2013	90	15	₹20 lakh (US$21,000)	N/A	Lonavala, Pune	Aneek Dhar	Rudranil Ghosh
Bengali (বাংলা)	Bigg Boss; Bangla	2 (2016)	Bigg Boss 2	Jeet	Colors Bangla, Voot	4 April 2016	15 July 2016	98	16	₹35 lakh (US$37,000)	N/A	Lonavala, Pune	Joyjit Banerjee	Priya Paul
Bengali (বাংলা)	Bigg Boss; Bangla	3 (2026)	Bigg Boss 3	Sourav Ganguly	Star Jalsha, JioHotstar	30 August 2026	TBA	TBA	17	TBA	N/A	TBA	TBA	TBA
Tamil (தமிழ்)	Bigg Boss; Tamil	1 (2017)	Bigg Boss	Kamal Haasan	Star Vijay, Hotstar	25 June 2017	30 September 2017	98	19	₹50 lakh (US$53,000)	Satiiysh Saarathy	EVP Film City, Chennai	Arav Nafeez	Snehan
Tamil (தமிழ்)	Bigg Boss; Tamil	2 (2018)	Bigg Boss 2	Kamal Haasan	Star Vijay, Hotstar	17 June 2018	30 September 2018	105	17	₹50 lakh (US$53,000)	Satiiysh Saarathy	EVP Film City, Chennai	Riythvika	Aishwarya Dutta
Tamil (தமிழ்)	Bigg Boss; Tamil	3 (2019)	Bigg Boss 3	Kamal Haasan	Star Vijay, Hotstar	23 June 2019	6 October 2019	105	17	₹50 lakh (US$53,000)	Satiiysh Saarathy	EVP Film City, Chennai	Mugen Rao	Sandy
Tamil (தமிழ்)	Bigg Boss; Tamil	4 (2020–21)	Bigg Boss 4	Kamal Haasan	Star Vijay, Disney+ Hotstar	4 October 2020	17 January 2021	105	18	₹50 lakh (US$53,000)	Satiiysh Saarathy	EVP Film City, Chennai	Aari Arujunan	Balaji Murugadoss
Tamil (தமிழ்)	Bigg Boss; Tamil	5 (2021–22)	Bigg Boss 5	Kamal Haasan	Star Vijay, Disney+ Hotstar	3 October 2021	16 January 2022	105	20	₹50 lakh (US$53,000)	Satiiysh Saarathy	EVP Film City, Chennai	Raju Jeyamohan	Priyanka Deshpande
Tamil (தமிழ்)	Bigg Boss; Tamil	6 (2022–23)	Bigg Boss 6	Kamal Haasan	Star Vijay, Disney+ Hotstar (24/7 Live Stream)	9 October 2022	22 January 2023	105	21	₹50 lakh (US$53,000)	Satiiysh Saarathy	EVP Film City, Chennai	Mohamed Azeem	Vikraman Radhakrishnan
Tamil (தமிழ்)	Bigg Boss; Tamil	7 (2023–24)	Bigg Boss 7	Kamal Haasan	Star Vijay, Disney+ Hotstar (24/7 Live Stream)	1 October 2023	14 January 2024	105	23	₹50 lakh (US$53,000)	Satiiysh Saarathy	EVP Film City, Chennai	Archana Ravichandran	Manichandra
Tamil (தமிழ்)	Bigg Boss; Tamil	8 (2024–25)	Bigg Boss 8	Vijay Sethupathi	Star Vijay, Disney+ Hotstar (24/7 Live Stream)	6 October 2024	19 January 2025	105	24	₹40.5 lakh (US$43,000)	Satiiysh Saarathy	EVP Film City, Chennai	Muthukumaran Jegatheesan	Soundariya Nanjundan
Tamil (தமிழ்)	Bigg Boss; Tamil	9 (2025–26)	Bigg Boss 9	Vijay Sethupathi	Star Vijay, JioHotstar (24/7 Live Stream)	5 October 2025	18 January 2026	105	24	₹50 lakh (US$53,000)	Satiiysh Saarathy	EVP Film City, Chennai	Divya Ganesh	R. Sabarinathan
Tamil (தமிழ்)	Bigg Boss; Tamil	10 (2026)	Bigg Boss 10: Carnivizha	Vijay Sethupathi	Star Vijay, JioHotstar (24/7 Live Stream)	6 September 2026	TBA	TBA	21	₹50 lakh (US$53,000)	Satiiysh Saarathy	EVP Film City, Chennai	TBA	TBA
Tamil (தமிழ்)	Bigg Boss Ultimate	1 (2022)	Bigg Boss Ultimate	Silambarasan	Disney+ Hotstar (24/7 Live Stream)	30 January 2022	10 April 2022	70	16	₹35 lakh (US$37,000)	Satiiysh Saarathy	EVP Film City, Chennai	Balaji Murugadoss	Niroop Nandakumar
Tamil (தமிழ்)	Bigg Boss: The Common Man	1 (2026)	Bigg Boss: The Common Man	Maya S. Krishnan	Star Vijay, JioHotstar	16 August 2026	5 September 2026	21	22	—N/a	—N/a	EVP Film City, Chennai	Selected contestants moved to Season 10	
Telugu (తెలుగు)	Bigg Boss; Telugu	1 (2017)	Bigg Boss	Jr NTR	Star Maa, Hotstar	16 July 2017	24 September 2017	70	16	₹50 lakh (US$53,000)	Shankar Kumar	Lonavala, Pune	Siva Balaji	Aadarsh Balakrishna
Telugu (తెలుగు)	Bigg Boss; Telugu	2 (2018)	Bigg Boss 2	Nani	Star Maa, Hotstar	10 June 2018	30 September 2018	112	18	₹50 lakh (US$53,000)	Shankar Kumar	Annapurna Studios, Hyderabad	Kaushal Manda	Geetha Madhuri
Telugu (తెలుగు)	Bigg Boss; Telugu	3 (2019)	Bigg Boss 3	Nagarjuna	Star Maa, Hotstar	21 July 2019	3 November 2019	105	17	₹50 lakh (US$53,000)	Shankar Kumar	Annapurna Studios, Hyderabad	Rahul Sipligunj	Sreemukhi
Telugu (తెలుగు)	Bigg Boss; Telugu	4 (2020)	Bigg Boss 4	Nagarjuna	Star Maa, Disney+ Hotstar	6 September 2020	20 December 2020	105	19	₹25 lakh (US$27,000)	Shankar Kumar	Annapurna Studios, Hyderabad	Abijeet	Akhil Sarthak
Telugu (తెలుగు)	Bigg Boss; Telugu	5 (2021)	Bigg Boss 5	Nagarjuna	Star Maa, Disney+ Hotstar	5 September 2021	19 December 2021	105	19	₹50 lakh (US$53,000)	Shankar Kumar	Annapurna Studios, Hyderabad	VJ Sunny	Shanmukh Jaswanth
Telugu (తెలుగు)	Bigg Boss; Telugu	6 (2022)	Bigg Boss 6	Nagarjuna	Star Maa, Disney+ Hotstar (24/7 Live Stream)	4 September 2022	18 December 2022	105	21	₹10 lakh (US$11,000)	Shankar Kumar	Annapurna Studios, Hyderabad	L. V. Revanth	Shrihan
Telugu (తెలుగు)	Bigg Boss; Telugu	7 (2023)	Bigg Boss 7: Ulta Pulta	Nagarjuna	Star Maa, Disney+ Hotstar (24/7 Live Stream)	3 September 2023	17 December 2023	105	19	₹35 lakh (US$37,000)	Shankar Kumar	Annapurna Studios, Hyderabad	Pallavi Prasanth	Amardeep Chowdary
Telugu (తెలుగు)	Bigg Boss; Telugu	8 (2024)	Bigg Boss 8: Limitless	Nagarjuna	Star Maa, Disney+ Hotstar (24/7 Live Stream)	1 September 2024	15 December 2024	105	22	₹55 lakh (US$59,000)	Shankar Kumar	Annapurna Studios, Hyderabad	Nikhil Maliyakkal	Gautham Krishna
Telugu (తెలుగు)	Bigg Boss; Telugu	9 (2025)	Bigg Boss 9: Ranarangam	Nagarjuna	Star Maa, JioHotstar (24/7 Live Stream)	7 September 2025	21 December 2025	105	22	₹35 lakh (US$37,000)	Shankar Kumar	Annapurna Studios, Hyderabad	Kalyan Padala	Thanuja Puttaswamy
Telugu (తెలుగు)	Bigg Boss; Telugu	10 (2026)	Bigg Boss 10: Dasavatharam	Nagarjuna	Star Maa, JioHotstar (24/7 Live Stream)	6 September 2026	TBA	TBA	23	TBA	Shankar Kumar	Annapurna Studios, Hyderabad	TBA	TBA
Telugu (తెలుగు)	Bigg Boss Non-Stop	1 (2022)	Bigg Boss Non-Stop	Nagarjuna	Disney+ Hotstar (24/7 Live Stream)	26 February 2022	21 May 2022	84	18	₹40 lakh (US$43,000)	Shankar Kumar	Annapurna Studios, Hyderabad	Bindu Madhavi	Akhil Sarthak
Telugu (తెలుగు)	Bigg Boss Agnipariksha	1 (2025)	Bigg Boss 9: Agnipariksha	Sreemukhi	JioHotstar	22 August 2025	5 September 2025	15	15	—N/a	—N/a	Annapurna Studios, Hyderabad	Selected contestants moved to Season 9	
Telugu (తెలుగు)	Bigg Boss Agnipariksha	2 (2026)	Bigg Boss 10: Agnipariksha	Sreemukhi	Star Maa, JioHotstar	15 August 2026	5 September 2026	22	15	—N/a	—N/a	Annapurna Studios, Hyderabad	Selected contestants moved to Season 10	
Marathi (मराठी)	Bigg Boss; Marathi	1 (2018)	Bigg Boss मराठी १	Mahesh Manjrekar	Colors Marathi, Voot	15 April 2018	22 July 2018	98	18	₹75 lakh (US$80,000)	Ratnakar Tardalkar	Lonavala, Pune	Megha Dhade	Pushkar Jog
Marathi (मराठी)	Bigg Boss; Marathi	2 (2019)	Bigg Boss मराठी २	Mahesh Manjrekar	Colors Marathi, Voot	26 May 2019	1 September 2019	98	17	₹75 lakh (US$80,000)	Ratnakar Tardalkar	Film City, Mumbai	Shiv Thakare	Neha Shitole
Marathi (मराठी)	Bigg Boss; Marathi	3 (2021)	Bigg Boss मराठी ३	Mahesh Manjrekar	Colors Marathi, Voot (24/7 Live Stream)	19 September 2021	26 December 2021	98	17	₹40 lakh (US$43,000)	Ratnakar Tardalkar	Film City, Mumbai	Vishal Nikam	Jay Dudhane
Marathi (मराठी)	Bigg Boss; Marathi	4 (2022–23)	Bigg Boss मराठी ४	Mahesh Manjrekar	Colors Marathi, Voot (24/7 Live Stream)	2 October 2022	8 January 2023	98	19	₹50 lakh (US$53,000)	Ratnakar Tardalkar	Film City, Mumbai	Akshay Kelkar	Apurva Nemlekar
Marathi (मराठी)	Bigg Boss; Marathi	5 (2024)	Bigg Boss मराठी ५	Riteish Deshmukh	Colors Marathi, JioCinema	28 July 2024	6 October 2024	70	17	₹14.6 lakh (US$16,000)	Ratnakar Tardalkar	Film City, Mumbai	Suraj Chavan	Abhijeet Sawant
Marathi (मराठी)	Bigg Boss; Marathi	6 (2026)	Bigg Boss मराठी ६	Riteish Deshmukh	Colors Marathi, JioHotstar	11 January 2026	19 April 2026	98	21	₹15 lakh (US$16,000)	Ratnakar Tardalkar	Film City, Mumbai	Tanvi Kolte	Raqesh Bapat
Malayalam (മലയാളം)	Bigg Boss; Malayalam	1 (2018)	Bigg Boss	Mohanlal	Asianet, Hotstar	24 June 2018	30 September 2018	98	18	₹1 crore (US$110,000)	Raghu Raj	Lonavala, Pune	Sabumon Abdusamad	Pearle Maaney
Malayalam (മലയാളം)	Bigg Boss; Malayalam	2 (2020)	Bigg Boss 2	Mohanlal	Asianet, Hotstar	5 January 2020	20 March 2020	74	23	₹1 crore (US$110,000)	Raghu Raj	EVP Film City, Chennai	Cancelled due to rise of COVID-19 pandemic in India	
Malayalam (മലയാളം)	Bigg Boss; Malayalam	3 (2021)	Bigg Boss 3	Mohanlal	Asianet, Disney+ Hotstar	14 February 2021	20 May 2021	95	18	₹75 lakh (US$80,000)	Raghu Raj	EVP Film City, Chennai	Manikuttan	Sai Vishnu
Malayalam (മലയാളം)	Bigg Boss; Malayalam	3 (2021)	Bigg Boss 3	Mohanlal	Asianet, Disney+ Hotstar	14 February 2021	1 August 2021	95	18	₹75 lakh (US$80,000)	Raghu Raj	EVP Film City, Chennai	Manikuttan	Sai Vishnu
Malayalam (മലയാളം)	Bigg Boss; Malayalam	4 (2022)	Bigg Boss 4	Mohanlal	Asianet, Disney+ Hotstar (24/7 Live Stream)	27 March 2022	3 July 2022	98	20	₹50 lakh (US$53,000)	Raghu Raj	Film City, Mumbai	Dilsha Prasannan	Blesslee
Malayalam (മലയാളം)	Bigg Boss; Malayalam	5 (2023)	Bigg Boss 5	Mohanlal	Asianet, Disney+ Hotstar (24/7 Live Stream)	26 March 2023	2 July 2023	98	21	₹50 lakh (US$53,000)	Raghu Raj	Film City, Mumbai	Akhil Marar	Reneesha Rahiman
Malayalam (മലയാളം)	Bigg Boss; Malayalam	6 (2024)	Bigg Boss 6	Mohanlal	Asianet, Disney+ Hotstar (24/7 Live Stream)	10 March 2024	16 June 2024	98	25	₹50 lakh (US$53,000)	Raghu Raj	EVP Film City, Chennai	Jinto Bodycraft	Arjun Syam Gopan
Malayalam (മലയാളം)	Bigg Boss; Malayalam	7 (2025)	Bigg Boss 7	Mohanlal	Asianet, JioHotstar (24/7 Live Stream)	3 August 2025	9 November 2025	98	25	₹42.55 lakh (US$45,000)	Raghu Raj	EVP Film City, Chennai	Anumol R S	Aneesh T A
Malayalam (മലയാളം)	Bigg Boss; Malayalam	8 (2026)	Bigg Boss 8	Mohanlal	Asianet, JioHotstar (24/7 Live Stream)	06 September 2026	13 December 2026	98	28	₹30 lakh (US$32,000)	Raghu Raj	EVP Film City, Chennai	TBA	TBA
Malayalam (മലയാളം)	Bigg Boss Agnipareeksha	1 (2026)	Bigg Boss 8: Agnipareeksha	Reneesha Rahiman	Asianet, JioHotstar	15 August 2026	5 September 2026	22	40	—N/a	—N/a	Kochi, Kerala	Selected contestants moved to Season 8	

Female Winners/Runner-ups
Male Winners/Runner-ups

== Summary ==
=== Bigg Boss Hindi ===
Bigg Boss is the Hindi-language and the first version of the franchise. The first season premiered in 2006 on Sony TV. It was hosted by Arshad Warsi. The prize money was ₹1 crore (US$110,000). The license for Bigg Boss was acquired by Viacom 18 and the next season was aired on Colors TV with Shilpa Shetty as the host. Veteran actor Amitabh Bachchan was roped in to play host for the third season while Salman Khan appeared as the host in the fourth season. The fifth season was jointly hosted by Sanjay Dutt and Salman Khan while Khan alone continues to host the show consecutively since sixth season until present. A lavish purpose-built house, with annual modifications was built in Lonavala, Mumbai for the show. A new house was built at ND Studios in Karjat, Pune for the fifth season. The house at Lonavala was rebuilt and used again from the sixth season. The prize was reduced to ₹50 lakh (US$53,000) since the fifth season. A spin off series, Bigg Boss: Halla Bol was launched and merged into the eighth season with five finalists from the eighth season and five previous runner ups which was hosted by Farah Khan. All subsequent seasons were then hosted by Salman Khan.

Bigg Boss OTT (or Bigg Boss: Over-the-Top), a spin-off Indian Hindi-language reality digital series of the show Bigg Boss that aired exclusively on Viacom 18's streaming service platform Voot (Season 1) and JioCinema (Season 2 and 3). The digital edition's Season 1 was hosted by Karan Johar and the show premiered its first season on 8 August 2021, Season 2 was hosted by Salman Khan which premiered on 17 June 2023 and Season 3 was hosted by Anil Kapoor which premiered on 21 June 2024.

Atul Kapoor has been the voice of Bigg Boss since the first season for both versions.

=== Bigg Boss Kannada ===
Bigg Boss Kannada is the Kannada version of the Bigg Boss reality TV show and it was the first south Indian adaptation of Bigg Boss. Actor Sudeep was roped in by ETV Kannada to play the host of the show for the first season in 2013 and for second season Star India acquired the license of the show and aired on Suvarna with Sudeep continuing his role as the host of the show. The Bigg Boss house at Lonavala which was used for the Hindi version was also used for the first two seasons of Bigg Boss Kannada. A new and bigger house was constructed at Innovative Film City in Bidadi, Bengaluru and is being used since the third season. Sudeep's contract to host the show was extended to five seasons starting with the third season which returned to Viacom 18's Colors Kannada. The fifth season moved to Colors Super, a sister channel of Colors Kannada. It is notable that the Kannada version is the only adaptation where the host, Sudeep alone would be hosting the show for nine consecutive seasons. All the seasons so far have had ₹50 lakh (US$53,000) as the prize money. Commoners were allowed to be a part of the show from the fifth season through auditions. Three artists have been the 'voice' of Bigg Boss as of fifth season - Amit Bhargav for the first two, B M Venkatesh for the third and Srinivas Prasad since the fourth season.

Bigg Boss OTT (or Bigg Boss: Over-the-Top), a spin-off Indian Kannada-language reality digital series of the show Bigg Boss that aired exclusively on Viacom 18's streaming service platform Voot. The digital edition hosted by Sudeepa and the show premiered its first season on 6 August 2022.

=== Bigg Boss Bangla ===
Bigg Boss Bangla is the Bengali version of the show which was produced by Colors Bangla with Mithun Chakraborty as the host while the first season of the Kannada version was wrapping up in 2013. The second season was aired in 2016 and was hosted by Bengali actor Jeet. The Lonavala house used for Hindi version was used in both seasons and the prize money for the show has been lesser than the other adaptations with ₹20 lakh (US$21,000) and ₹35 lakh (US$37,000) respectively for the first and second seasons. This is the only adaptation of the show that does not follow the annual format and the seasons have been produced once in 3 years. The reality show however has been discontinued after season 2 but a leading Bengali TV channel is planning to launch its new season and discussion about copyright issues is still on and show makers are yet to finalise it.

=== Bigg Boss Tamil ===
Bigg Boss Tamil is the Tamil version of the show and the second south Indian adaptation of Bigg Boss. Star India produced the show in 2017 with Kamal Haasan as the host on Star Vijay. This has been the only version to have none of its seasons shot at Lonavala. The house was constructed at EVP Film City, Chennai and is being used since the first season. All the three seasons so far have had ₹50 lakh (US$53,000) as the prize money. Halfway through season 5, the main host actor Kamal Haasan fell ill and was replaced by actress Ramya Krishnan to host the show until he recovered. From eighth season, the show is being hosted by Vijay Sethupathi.

Bigg Boss Ultimate, a spin-off Indian Tamil-language reality digital series of the show Bigg Boss that aired exclusively on Disney Star's streaming service platform Disney+ Hotstar. The digital edition hosted by Kamal Haasan but later he replaced by Silambarasan and the show premiered its first season on 30 January 2022.

=== Bigg Boss Telugu ===
Bigg Boss Telugu is the Telugu version of the Bigg Boss reality TV show and telecasted by Star Maa in 2017. The first season Jr NTR is being hosted the show and the Lonavala house was used for the show. The second season was hosted by Nani. From third season onwards Nagarjuna continued as a host for the show. Ramya Krishnan and Samantha Akkineni appeared as a guest host in Season 3 and Season 4 respectively in the absence of main host. From second season onwards a newly built house was constructed at Annapurna Studios, Hyderabad is being used for the show. All the Seasons so far have had ₹50 lakh (US$53,000) as the prize money.

Bigg Boss Non-Stop, a spin-off Indian Telugu-language reality digital series of the show Bigg Boss that aired exclusively on Disney Star's streaming service platform Disney+ Hotstar. The digital edition hosted by Nagarjuna and the show premiered its first season on 26 February 2022.

=== Bigg Boss Marathi ===
Bigg Boss Marathi is the Marathi version of the show and the first season is being aired on Viacom 18's Colors Marathi. The Lonavala house is being used for this version and Mahesh Manjrekar is playing the host. From the 2nd season onwards house is made in Goregaon film city, Mumbai. This is the first and only adaptation of Bigg Boss so far to have its language affiliation in the show's official name. The prize money is announced to be ₹50 lakh (US$53,000). From the fifth season onward, Riteish Deshmukh replaced Mahesh Manjrekar as the host of the series.

=== Bigg Boss Malayalam ===
Bigg Boss Malayalam is the Malayalam adaptation of Bigg Boss, produced by Star India and broadcast on Asianet. Veteran actor Mohanlal has been roped to host the show and the Lonavala house was used for the first season. The prize money for the first season was announced to be ₹ 1 crore (US$140,000). All episodes of the show are available on the ott Disney+ Hotstar digital platform. For second, third and sixth seasons, house shifted to EVP Film City in Chennai, Tamil Nadu. The fourth and fifth seasons, the house being in Film City, Mumbai. The seventh season introduced a new house built exclusively for the Malayalam version, thereby establishing a permanent location in Chennai.

== Records ==
- Salman Khan, the host of Bigg Boss Hindi, is the longest-serving host of Bigg Boss.
- Bigg Boss Malayalam had the highest number of contestants in single season, with 28 participants in its eighth season.
- Bigg Boss Malayalam recorded the highest number of evictions in a single day with six contestants evicted and two others sent to the secret room in its eighth season.
- Jacquline Lydia, contestant of eighth season of Bigg Boss Tamil is the most nominated contestant in the Indian Bigg Boss franchise, being consecutively nominated and saved every week of her 15-week stay in the house.
- 2026 marked the first time that six language versions of Bigg Boss —Hindi, Telugu, Tamil, Malayalam, Kannada, and Bangla telecast as part of the same season rollout. The Bangla version launched on 30 August, while the other five versions premiered simultaneously on 6 September 2026.
