= List of Bigg Boss Kannada controversies =

Bigg Boss: Kannada is a television reality show broadcast on Colors Kannada in India. It follows the Big Brother format, which was first developed by Endemol in the Netherlands.

== Season 3 ==
In the third season, Huccha Venkat was eliminated from the show for breaking the show rules and assaulting fellow housemate Ravi Mooruru. The season witnessed Venkat's opposition to almost every happenings on the show. He claimed to have formed and maintained 'Huccha Venkat Sene', a civilian army to fight against corruption and ban item numbers in movies. Mooruru had accused Venkat's non-involvement in the house tasks a day before Sudeep's weekend episode. While answering Sudeep's question on the weekend episode, he started to speak about Venkat's claim about the 'Sene' which enraged Venkat to manhandle Mooruru. He continued to slap Ravi until he was dragged away by other housemates causing Ravi to bleed. The act caused Bigg Boss Kannada's first ever Elimination (direct eviction) for Venkat as Sudeep slammed his actions and directed him out of the house. He was escorted out of the house by bouncers. Post eviction, he made statements against Ravi, show host Sudeep, and other housemates including Rehman and Chandan. Sudeep's fans revolted against this and Venkat was made to apologize for his statements against Sudeep on live TV. The act eventually led to Venkat's arrest. After the season concluded, Venkat and Mooruru have been on good terms.

== Season 4 ==
Huccha Venkat was invited on the show as a guest for a task on the 37th day of the fourth season. Pratham, a housemate from the concurrent season and Venkat were involved in a heated exchange of words previously because of Pratham's offer of a cricket bookie role for Venkat in his upcoming film. The issue was shown on news channels during the start of the season and was portrayed that the two do not like each other. During the task on the show, Pratham tried to irritate Venkat with his choice of words only to end up getting assaulted by him. Venkat was escorted out of the Bigg Boss house by the bouncers, for the second time. Venkat said later to the press that he went inside the house once again only to beat Pratham up as he disrespected women. Sudeep, the host of the show disliked these actions and threatened to discontinue as the host of Bigg Boss Kannada unless Venkat apologizes for his actions in public. Sudeep continued to host the show after Venkat appeared on the next episode and apologized in front of the camera. Post conclusion of Bigg Boss Kannada 4, Venkat and Pratham have been on good terms.

== Season 5 ==
Samyuktha Hegde entered the house on the 58th day of the fifth season as a guest contestant. Samyuktha assaulted Sameer Acharya, a contestant of the season claiming that Sameer had touched her inappropriately during a task on the 66th day. Sameer demanded for a fair judgement and added that he was ready to walk out of the house proven to have committed the mistake. Both the contestants were called to the confession room and Samyuktha apologized to Sameer for what happened. Samyuktha was eliminated from the house on the same day since assaulting a co-contestant is against the rules of the show.

== Season 8 ==
The season was supposed to be started as usual in the October month. But, due to the COVID-19 pandemic, the show got delayed and was postponed to February of the next year. Also, for the first time in the Bigg Boss Kannada history, Sudeep was unable to host the weekend episodes for 2 weeks due to his illness. Later, due to the lockdown imposed in India for the prevention of COVID-19 spread, the shooting for the weekend episode has got paused again, for the 3rd week.
