= Shruti Sharma (disambiguation) =

Shruti Sharma may refer to:

- Shruti Sharma (born 1981), Indian model and actress
- Shruti Sharma (actress) (born 1994), Indian actress

== See also ==
- Shruti (disambiguation)
