= Big Brother 2017 =

Big Brother 2017 may refer to:

- Big Brother Naija 2017
- Big Brother 18 (UK)
- Big Brother 19 (U.S.)
- Bigg Boss 10, the 2016-2017 edition of Big Brother in India in Hindi
- Bigg Boss 11, the 2017-2018 edition of Big Brother in India in Hindi
- Bigg Boss Kannada (season 5), the 2017 edition of Big Brother in India in Kannada
- Bigg Boss (Tamil season 1), the 2017 edition of Big Brother in India in Tamil
- Bigg Boss (Telugu season 1), the 2017 edition of Big Brother in India in Telugu
