= Bigg Boss Kannada season 3 =

Bigg Boss Kannada
- Season 3
- Season 3 eye logo
- Presented by: Sudeep
- No. of days: 98
- No. of housemates: 18
- Winner: Shruthi
- Runner-up: Chandan Kumar
- No. of episodes: 99

Release
- Original network: Colors Kannada
- Original release: 25 October 2015 – 31 January 2016

Series chronology
- ← Previous; Season 2 Next → Season 4

Bigg Boss 3 is the third season of the Kannada-language version of Indian reality television series Bigg Boss started on 25 October 2015 and ended on 31 January 2016 on Colors Kannada. Sudeep, the host of previous seasons remains as the host.

Among five finalists Shruthi emerged as the title winner with maximum votes and performance in house followed by Chandan Kumar as runner-up, Master Anand, Rehman Haseeb and Pooja Gandhi as third, fourth and fifth respectively

== Housemates status ==
Sr	Housemate	Day entered	Day exited	Status
1	Shruti	Day 1	Day 98	Winner
2	Chandan	Day 1	Day 98	1st runner-up
3	Anand	Day 1	Day 98	2nd runner-up
4	Rehman	Day 1	Day 97	3rd runner-up
5	Pooja	Day 1	Day 35	Evicted
5	Pooja	Day 40	Day 97	4th runner-up
6	Aiyappa	Day 1	Day 91	Evicted
7	Kitty	Day 1	Day 84	Evicted
8	Gauthami	Day 42	Day 84	Evicted
9	Sushma	Day 42	Day 77	Evicted
10	Bhavana	Day 1	Day 70	Evicted
11	Kruthika	Day 1	Day 63	Evicted
12	Mithra	Day 43	Day 56	Evicted
13	Nethra	Day 1	Day 49	Evicted
14	Neha	Day 1	Day 42	Evicted
15	Ravi	Day 1	Day 28	Evicted
16	Venkat	Day 1	Day 21	Ejected
17	Jayashree	Day 1	Day 14	Evicted
18	Madhuri	Day 1	Day 7	Evicted

== Housemates ==
1. Bhavana Belegere is a TV host and the daughter of journalist Ravi Belagere. She is married to actor Srinagar Kitty.
2. Chandan Kumar appeared in the television serials Lakshmi Baaramma and Radha Kalyana. He has also acted in films like Parinaya, Katte, Eradondla Mooru and recently in Luv U Alia.
3. Huccha Venkat is an actor, director and producer. He was the first contestant to be evicted out of the house in the history of Bigg Boss Kannada for assaulting a housemate.
4. Jayashree Ramaiah is a model and dancer by profession.
5. Kruttika Ravindra is a Kannada film and serial artist. She made her debut on silver screen with the Kannada film Patre Loves Padma. She came into prominence with the lead role in daily soap opera Radha Kalyana.
6. Madhuri Itagi played lead actress in the movies Rambo and Ouija
7. Master Anand is an actor who started his career as a child artist and now is a television actor. He has directed numerous Kannada movies and TV serials. He is also the winner of "Dancing Star 2".
8. Neravanda Aiyappa is a cricketer who played for Karnataka team in Ranji and other domestic tournaments. He is also the younger brother of Kannada actress Prema.
9. Neha Gowda is a serial actress.
10. Pooja Gandhi is an actress, movie producer and politician who has acted in over 50 films in multiple languages, including Mungaaru Male. She was evicted from the show but kept in a secret room and returned later..
11. Pradeep alias Tsunami Kitty was the winner of reality show "Indian". He also won the first season of Thaka Dhimi Tha Dancing Star. He is a vegetable vendor by profession and is based out of Heggada Devana Kote, one of the taluk of Mysore district.
12. Ravi Mooruru is a singer and music composer, who has mainly worked for television serials.
13. Rehman Haseeb/Hassan is a TV news presenter from TV 9. He is from Hassan District. He is a TV news presenter for the last 10 years. He currently resides in Bangalore. He is married to his co-worker Sameena .
14. RJ Nethra is a two time national award-winning radio jockey working for 91.1 FM. She has also acted in movies like "Aatagara" and "Ring Road".
15. Shruti is an actress and politician. She has not only acted in Kannada but also in Tamil and Malayalam. She is serving as the chief Secretary in BJP women's wing of Karnataka. She won the Bigg Boss 3 thereby fulfilling her daughter's dream.

=== Wild card contestants ===
1. Mithra is a famous Kannada comedian.(Janesha in "Silli Lalli")
2. Gowthami Gowda is a Kannada TV actress. She was acted in the name of serial chi sow savithri telecasted on Zee TV Kannada.
3. Sushma Veer is a theatre and dance artist. Also Sushma Veer, is the daughter of singer and veteran actress B Jayashree.

== Weekly summary ==
	Monday	Tuesday	Wednesday	Thursday	Friday	Saturday	Sunday
Event	Nominations	Weekly task highlights			Captain nomination	Elimination	Promotion and interview

Week 1	Entrances	Bhavana Belagere, Chandan Kumar, Huccha Venkat, Jayashree, Kruthika, Madhuri, Master Anand, NC Aiyappa, Neha Gowda, Pooja Gandhi, Pradeepa, Ravi Mooruru, Rehman Haseeb, RJ Nethra and Shruthi entered the Bigg Boss house on Day 1.
Week 1	Nominations	Tsunami Kitty, Maduri Itagi, Ravi and Kruthika.
Week 1	Immunity	
Week 1	House Captain	Shruthi
Week 1	Tasks	Shaanthi kaanthi
Week 1	Highlights	Huccha Venkat V/S Pooja Gandhi.; Started off due to Venkat where he ordered Pooja not to wear western clothes while she told that if he thought that he was her brother then he shouldn't be bothered about what is below her eyes.
Week 1	Exit	Madhuri Itagi
Week 1	Guest on stage	Priyamani
Week 2	Nominations	Tsunami Kitty, Jayashree
Week 2	Immunity	R J Nethra
Week 2	House Captain	Shruthi
Week 2	Tasks	Baduku JaTaka BanDi
Week 2	Highlights	Huccha Venkat punished for not singing. Anand was made to carry Huccha Venkat on him 5 rounds around the pool as punishment.; Ravi Mooruru fought with Huccha Venkat for failing on two occasions to complete task; Huccha Venkat received special individual 200 points in the Baduku JaTaka BanDi task, since he did highest number of rounds (76).; R J Nethra was given secret task to spoil the Baduku JaTaka BanDi task and in turn get immunity for following week. She dropped the knife and broke the rules of the task. She received immunity for Week 3.
Week 2	Exit	Jayashree
Week 2	Guest on stage	Diganth, Aindrita Ray, Chikkanna
Week 3	Nominations	Kruthika Ravindra, Neha Gowda, Ravi Mooruru
Week 3	Immunity	Kruthika Ravindra
Week 3	House Captain	Master Anand
Week 3	Tasks	aLu arasa (servant-master)
Week 3	Highlights	Kruthika Ravindra direct nomination from captain. Neha Gowda nominated from the team, second highest votes and also by captain.; Huccha Venkat participated in aaLu(slave)-arasa(king) task only when he was arasa and refused to participate when it was his turn to be aalu.; Huccha Venkat was asked to keep his father's slipper on his head.; Huccha Venkat ejected for Physical violence with Ravi Mooruru.
Week 3	Exit	Huccha Venkat
Week 3	Guest on stage	Chiranjeevi Sarja, Amulya, Ravishankar Gowda
Week 4	Nominations	RJ Nethra, Chandan, Neha Gowda, Ravi Moorur
Week 4	Immunity	
Week 4	House Captain	Rehman Haseeb
Week 4	Tasks	
Week 4	Highlights	
Week 4	Exit	Ravi Moorur
Week 4	Guest on stage	Hari Priya

== Nominations table ==
	Week 1	Week 2	Week 3	Week 4	Week 5	Week 6	Week 7	Week 8	Week 9	Week 10	Week 11	Week 12	Week 13	Week 14
House Captain														None
House Captain's Nomination														None
														Winner (Day 98)
														1st runner-up (Day 98)
														2nd runner-up (Day 98)
														3rd runner-up (Day 98)
														4th runner-up (Day 98)
														Evicted (Day 91)
													Evicted (Day 84)	
													Evicted (Day 84)	
												Evicted (Day 77)		
											Evicted (Day 70)			
										Evicted (Day 63)				
									Evicted (Day 56)					
								Evicted (Day 49)						
							Evicted (Day 42)							
					Evicted (Day 28)									
				Ejected (Day 21)										
			Evicted (Day 14)											
		Evicted (Day 7)												
Notes				None										
Against Public Vote					Pooja, Kitty, Rehman, Neha									
Re-entered								None						
Ejected				none										
Evicted					Pooja									

=== Notes ===
- ^Note 1: Kruthika direct nomination by House Captain.
- ^Note 2: Huccha ejected because he manhandled Ravi.
