= Bigg Boss Kannada season 2 =

Bigg Boss Kannada
- Season 2
- Season 2 eye logo
- Presented by: Sudeep
- No. of days: 98
- No. of housemates: 15
- Winner: Akul Balaji
- Runner-up: Srujan Lokesh

Release
- Original network: Asianet Suvarna
- Original release: 29 June – 5 October 2014

Series chronology
- ← Previous; Season 1 Next → Season 3

Bigg Boss 2 is the second season of the Kannada-language version of Indian reality television series Bigg Boss was telecast on Asianet Suvarna and produced by Endemol India. The show premiered on 29 June 2014 with Sudeep as the host.

Among four finalists Akul Balaji emerged as the title winner with maximum votes and performance in house followed by Srujan Lokesh as runner-up, Deepika Kamaiah and Shwetha Chengappa as third and fourth respectively

== Housemates status ==
| Sr | Housemate | Day entered | Day exited | Status |
|---|---|---|---|---|
| 1 | Akul | Day 1 | Day 99 | Winner |
| 2 | Srujan | Day 1 | Day 99 | 1st runner-up |
| 3 | Deepika | Day 1 | Day 99 | 2nd runner-up |
| 4 | Swetha | Day 1 | Day 99 | 3rd runner-up |
| 5 | Anupama | Day 1 | Day 91 | Evicted |
| 6 | Guruprasad | Day 47 | Day 84 | Evicted |
| 7 | Neethu | Day 1 | Day 77 | Evicted |
| 8 | Santhosh | Day 1 | Day 70 | Evicted |
| 9 | Rohith | Day 1 | Day 70 | Evicted |
| 10 | Aadhi | Day 1 | Day 63 | Evicted |
| 11 | Harshika | Day 1 | Day 14 | Evicted |
| 11 | Harshika | Day 35 | Day 49 | Evicted |
| 12 | Mayur | Day 1 | Day 42 | Evicted |
| 13 | Laya | Day 1 | Day 28 | Evicted |
| 14 | Shakila | Day 1 | Day 21 | Evicted |
| 15 | Anita | Day 1 | Day 7 | Evicted |

== Housemates ==
=== Original entrants ===
1. Adi Lokesh, son of late Mysore Lokesh, is known for his villain roles in Kannada film industry.
2. Akul Balaji is a host of Kannada reality shows, Thaka Dhimi Tha Dancing Star (2014) being the most recent. Akul Balaji currently the winner of Bigg Boss Kannada Season 2.
3. Anita Bhat Prabhakar Mandya
4. Anupama Bhat anchored morning show and Kitchen Taare on (Udaya TV) and was a contestant in Thaka Dhimi Tha Dancing Star.
5. Deepika Kamaiah is a Kannada actress notable for a leading role in the 2012 movie Chingari along with Darshan Thoogudeep.
6. Harshika Poonacha is a Kannada actress notable for roles in movies Thamassu, Jackie and Mangana Kaili Maanikya.
7. Laya Kokila, elder brother of Sadhu Kokila, is cast as a comedian in the movies Devarane (2013) and Rangappa Hogbitna.
8. Mayur Patel is an actor since 2000. Some of his movies are Mani (2003), Gunna (2005), Udees (2005), Muniya (2009), Hunja (2010) and Slum (2013).
9. Neethu Shetty is an actress from Mangalore who appeared in movies like Jokefalls, Gaalipata and Manasaare.
10. Rohith Patel is a RJ of FM show No tension on BIG FM 92.7.
11. Santhosh Aryan is an actor who had played a lead role in movies like Nooru Janumaku (2010), Abhiram (2010) and Ishta (2014).actor
12. Shakeela is a film actress and glamour model. She is also seen in comic roles in several South Indian films.
13. Srujan Lokesh, son of late Lokesh and Girija Lokesh, is an actor and a popular host of TV programs Maja With Sruja (Suvarna TV), Chota Champion (Zee Kannada), "Maja Talkies" (Colors Kannada) and currently "Comedy Talkies" (Colors Kannada)
14. Swetha Changappa is a Kannada telesoap actress who became a household name by her role of Kadambari in Kannada soap Kadambari.She also hosted TV shows Yaariguntu Yaarigilla and Kuniyonu Baara on Zee Kannada. She also acted in ETV Kannada's serials Arundhati and Sukanya.

== Wild card entries ==
=== Guruprasad ===
Guruprasad was a director of hit movies Mata, Eddelu Manjunatha and Director's Special. He was a judge for the dance reality show Thaka Dhimi Tha Dancing Star (2014).he hosted Life Super Guru in Zee Kannada. Guruprasad's stay in Bigg Boss has been controversial, marred by his inability to get along with the other contestants.

== Guests ==
=== Bullet Prakash ===
Prakash is well known as Bullet Prakash. He is a famous comedian in Kannada industry. He had acted with many legend actors like Ravichandran, Sudeep, Sadhu Kokila etc.

== Episodes ==
The episodes were broadcast by Asianet Suvarna channel at a time slot of 8 to 9 pm daily.

| | Monday | Tuesday | Wednesday | Thursday | Friday | Saturday | Sunday |
|---|---|---|---|---|---|---|---|
| Event | Nominations | Weekly Task | | House Captaincy | 1-Day Task | Eviction; Kicchina Kathe Kicchana Jothe | Guests / Post Eviction; Sakkath Sunday with Sudeep |

== Daily summary ==
| J U N E | 29 | Day 1 | Launch | Fourteen contestants entered the Bigg Boss house located in Lonavala.; Birthday celebrations were held on stage for contestant Srujan Lokesh who turned 34 on 28 June. |
| J U N E | 30 | Day 2 | Nominations | Day 2 nomination starts off with a twist. Housemates are asked to pair (own choice) and wear a handcuff thereby breaking one large group into a bit of two which narrowed the decision making.: Shakeela (4 votes), Anita (4 votes), Santhosh (2 votes) and Rohith (2 votes) were nominated. |
| J U L Y | 1 | Day 3 | Task 1 Tulabhara Seva; Points [2200 / 2800] | Duration: 24 hours Description: Task 1 was to balance a large scale with two housemates on one side and objects on the other side. Rules: Housemates could use objects like suitcases filled with clothing and/or iron weights (50 kg) which were provided.; The housemates would lose 200 points each time if any of the scale side touches the ground.; One housemate would lose his/her suitcase, if the sides touch the ground every 5th time. |
| J U L Y | 2 | Day 4 | Task 1 Tulabhara Seva; Points [2200 / 2800] | Duration: 24 hours Description: Task 1 was to balance a large scale with two housemates on one side and objects on the other side. Rules: Housemates could use objects like suitcases filled with clothing and/or iron weights (50 kg) which were provided.; The housemates would lose 200 points each time if any of the scale side touches the ground.; One housemate would lose his/her suitcase, if the sides touch the ground every 5th time. |
| J U L Y | 3 | Day 5 | House Captain; Srujan | Shakeela (special rights) suggested two names for captaincy: Surjan and Harkshika. Voting Results: Srujan (11 votes) and Harshika (3 votes) |
| J U L Y | 4 | Day 6 | Day Task 1 Naane Best | All housemates had to talk about their lifetime achievements and designate a number [1-14] to indicate their superiority.: 1 / Shakeela / 2 / Laya / 3 / Akul / 4 / Harshika / 5 / Neethu / 6 / Swetha / 7 / Anupama / 8 / Deepika / 9 / Mayur / 10 / Rohith / 11 / Anita / 12 / Santhosh / 13 / Aadhi / 14 / Srujan; Punishment : Srujan was caged for 4 hours as he had violated the house/captain rules. |
| J U L Y | 5 | Day 7 | Eviction | Anita was evicted from the house after facing public vote. Special Rights: Anita choose Rohith to wash all utensils in the house, which was effective for 3 days. |
| J U L Y | 6 | Day 8 | Guests on stage | Crazy Star Ravichandran was invited as a guest on Sunday. Evicted housemate Anita was interviewed. |
| J U L Y | 7 | Day 9 | Nominations | Harshika (captain's nomination), Rohith (7 votes) and Akul (5 votes) were nominated. |
| J U L Y | 8 | Day 10 | Task 2 Sampathige Saval; Points [1200/1400] | Division: Housemates were divided in two teams adrustavantaru and nathadrustaru, each led by a captain.: Adrustavantaru had the luxury to stay in-house and enjoy special meals send by Bigg Boss. They were relieved from household duties, but had to retain their position to win the task.; Nathadrustaru had to stay outside the house, cook an ordinary meal, wear poor clothes and engage in all household activities. Their task was to attain the position of Adrustavantaru by replacing badges/keys.; Gameplay: Three wooden stands with keys were placed at different locations in the house. Team nathadrustaru had to tactically replace two of the three keys with badges (or vice versa), whereas team adrustavantaru had to prevent it. Bigg Boss would announce the end game and the housemates who were on the side of adrustavantaru were declared as the winner. Coordinator: Srujan: Team Captain / Teammates / Result; Akul / Swetha, Laya, Shakeela, Rohith, Anupama / Lost; Aadhi / Deepika, Santhosh, Harshika, Neethu, Mayur / Won; Punishment : After the weekly task completion, Bigg Boss ordered Santhosh to be quiet for the next 19 hours as a punishment for extensive use of English language. He could communicate non-verbally and Deepkia would translate it. |
| J U L Y | 9 | Day 11 | Task 2 Sampathige Saval; Points [1200/1400] | |
| J U L Y | 10 | Day 12 | House Captain; Aadhi | Three housemates volunteered for house captaincy. Voting Results: Aadhi (10 votes), Deepika (2 votes) and Mayur (1 votes) |
| J U L Y | 11 | Day 13 | Day Task 2 Laya Pranaya Prasanga | The task was to readying the housemate Laya to go on a dinner date. This involved complete body makeover, outfit selection, behavior and dating/dinner tips. Laya choose Deepika for the date. |
| J U L Y | 12 | Day 14 | Eviction | Harshika was evicted from the house after facing public vote. Special Rights: Harshika choose Shakeela to be deprived from voting rights during the next nomination process. |
| J U L Y | 13 | Day 15 | Guests on stage | Singer Vijay Prakash and villain Ravi Shankar were invited as guests on Sunday. Evicted housemate Harshika was interviewed. |

== Nominations table ==
| | Week 1 | Week 2 | Week 3 | Week 4 | Week 5 | Week 6 | Week 7 | Week 8 | Week 9 | Week 10 | Week 11 | Week 12 | Week 13 | Week 14 | |
|---|---|---|---|---|---|---|---|---|---|---|---|---|---|---|---|
| House Captain | | Srujan | Aadhi | Akul | Deepika | Rohith | Santhosh | Swetha | Neethu | Guruprasad | Akul | Swetha | Srujan | | |
| Captain's Nominations | | Harshika | Rohith | Santhosh | Anupama | | Rohith | Guruprasad | | Rohith; Deepika | Guruprasad (safe) | Guruprasad; Deepika | Akul; Deepika | | |
| Vote to: | Evict | | | Save | Evict | | | | | Not Win | Evict | | | | |
| Akul | Anita | Rohith; Mayur | Laya; Mayur | House Captain | Srujan; Rohith | Mayur; Swetha | Harshika; Aadhi | Rohith; Aadhi | No; Nominations | Anupama; Rohith | House Captain | Srujan; Deepika | Deepika; Swetha | Winner (Day 99) | |
| Srujan | Shakeela | House Captain | Santhosh; Shakeela | Laya; Swetha | Santhosh; Neethu | Mayur; Anupama | Deepika; Harshika | Guruprasad; Santhosh | No; Nominations | Santhosh; Neethu | Deepika; Neethu | Guruprasad; Akul | House Captain | 1st runner-up (Day 99) | |
| Deepika | Anita | Mayur; Anupama | Laya; Anupama | Neethu; Santhosh | House Captain | Swetha; Anupama | Anupama; Swetha | Aadhi; Srujan | No; Nominations | Rohith; Srujan | Swetha; Srujan | Guruprasad; Srujan | Swetha; Akul | 2nd runner-up (Day 99) | |
| Swetha | Anita | Rohith; Neethu | Deepika; Neethu | Anupama; Srujan | Aadhi; Neethu | Mayur; Anupama | Harshika; Neethu | House Captain | No; Nominations | Santhosh; Neethu | Deepika; Neethu | House Captain | Akul; Deepika | 3rd runner-up (Day 99) | |
| Anupama | Rohith | Neethu; Deepika | Neethu; Deepika | Swetha; Srujan | Neethu; Aadhi | Mayur; Swetha | Harshika; Neethu | Guruprasad; Santhosh | No; Nominations | Santhosh; Akul | Deepika; Neethu | Guruprasad; Deepika | Deepika; Akul | Evicted (Day 91) | |
| Guruprasad | Not In House | | | | Exempt | Mayur; Swetha | Neethu; Aadhi | Not eligible | No; Nominations | House Captain | Neethu; Deepika | Deepika; Srujan | Evicted (Day 84) | | |
| Neethu | Rohith | Anupama; Rohith | Laya; Santhosh | Deepika; Aadhi | Swetha; Srujan | Secret Room | Guruprasad; Anupama | Guruprasad; Akul | House Captain | Santhosh; Anupama | Srujan; Swetha | Evicted (Day 77) | | | |
| Rohith | Santhosh | Swetha; Akul | Laya; Neethu | Mayur; Anupama | Aadhi; Akul | House Captain | Akul; Deepika | Santhosh; Guruprasad | No; Nominations | Akul; Deepika | Evicted (Day 70) | | | | |
| Santhosh | Aadhi | Rohith; Laya | Neethu; Shakeela | Rohith; Deepika | Srujan; Aadhi | Mayur; Srujan | House Captain | Aadhi; Neethu | No; Nominations | Anupama; Rohith | Evicted (Day 70) | | | | |
| Aadhi | Shakeela | Akul; Santhosh | House Captain | Swetha; Anupama | Swetha; Santhosh | Swetha; Anupama | Akul; Deepika | Guruprasad; Santhosh | No; Nominations | Evicted (Day 63) | | | | | |
| Harshika | Shakeela | Akul; Rohith | Evicted (Day 14) | | | Exempt | Swetha; Deepika | Evicted (Day 49) | | | | | | | |
| Mayur | Anita | Santhosh; Akul | Neethu; Laya | Aadhi; Laya | Swetha; Santhosh | Swetha; Anupama | Evicted (Day 42) | | | | | | | | |
| Laya | Shakeela | Akul; Rohith | Shakeela; Santhosh | Srujan; Deepika | Evicted (Day 28) | | | | | | | | | | |
| Shakila | Mayur | Rohith; Laya | Not eligible | Evicted (Day 21) | | | | | | | | | | | |
| Anita | Santhosh | Evicted (Day 7) | | | | | | | | | | | | | |
| Notes | 1 | | 2 | 3 | 4, 5 | 6,7 | | 8,9 | 10 | 11, 12 | 12 | 12,13 | 12,14 | | |
| Against Public votes | Shakila; Anita; Santhosh; Rohith | Harshika; Rohith; Akul; Shakeela | Rohith; Neethu; Laya; Shakeela; Santhosh | Aadhi; Laya; Mayur; Neethu; Rohith | Anupama; Swetha; Neethu; Santhosh; Aadhi; Srujan | Anupama; Swetha; Mayur | Rohith; Harshika; Neethu; Deepika | Guruprasad; Santhosh | Aadhi; Akul; Anupama; Deepika; Guruprasad; Rohith; Santhosh; Srujan; Swetha | Anupama; Santhosh; Rohith | Anupama; Srujan; Swetha; Neethu; Deepika | Anupama; Deepika; Srujan; Guruprasad | Anupama; Akul; Deepika; Swetha | Akul; Deepika; Srujan; Swetha | |
| Re-entered | None | | | | | Harshika | None | | | | | | | | |
| Secret Room | none | | | | | Neethu | None | | | | | | | | |
| Evicted | Anita | Harshika | Shakila | Laya | No; Eviction | Mayur | Harshika | No; Eviction | Aadhi | Rohith | Neethu | Guruprasad | Anupama | Swetha | Deepika |
| Evicted | Anita | Harshika | Shakila | Laya | No; Eviction | Mayur | Harshika | No; Eviction | Aadhi | Santhosh | Neethu | Guruprasad | Anupama | Srujan | Akul |

== Notes ==
- ^Note 1: Housemates were asked to pair and participate in the nomination process.
- ^Note 2: Harshika (Special rights) chose Shakeela to be deprived from voting rights.
- ^Note 3: Akul (House captain) chose Santhosh to be safe from eviction.
- ^Note 4: Guruprasad entered the house after the weeks' nomination process.
- ^Note 5: Neethu moved to secret room instead of being evicted.
- ^Note 6: Harshika (Special rights) chose Srujan, Anupama, Swetha and Mayur to face nomination (others were safe).
- ^Note 7: House captain Rohith's nomination was counted as 2 votes.
- ^Note 8: No elimination week.
- ^Note 9: Shweta (House captain) chose Guruprasad to be deprived from voting rights.
- ^Note 10: All housemates except the captain were nominated for eviction by Bigg Boss.
- ^Note 11: Housemates were asked to take two names who does not deserve to win the Bigg Boss title.
- ^Note 12: Twist - Anupama, Santhosh and Rohith were directly nominated for the remaining weeks and were not eligible for captainship.
- ^Note 13: Twist - Housemates' family members were asked to nominate.
- ^Note 14: Open nominations, held at living area.

== Marketing and sponsors ==
Production: The channel claims that 14 contestants (initially) will compete for a cash prize of ₹ 50 lakhs and the show will last 100 episodes. The amount for retaining host Sudeep is about Rs 1.5 crores to Rs 2.5 crores Sources estimate that the production cost of the show is about Rs 16 crores to Rs 17 crores across the 100 episodes, with the total cost pegged at around Rs 30 lakh to Rs 35 lakh.

Sponsors: the show has OLX.in as title sponsor, CERA as the powered sponsor, and Dollar Bigg Boss as associate sponsor.

Marketing: Advertising was purchased on buses, hoardings, FM stations, multiplex, and print media. The channel is promoting the show on the digital platform like websites and social networking..The entire digital marketing, website, social media and online-voting was handled by Fuego Systems

Promotion: Promos, ads, and special programs on Suvarna TV's sister channels Suvarna Plus and Suvarna News were aired to promote the show.
