= Bigg Boss Kannada season 4 =

Bigg Boss Kannada
- Season 4
- Season 4 eye logo
- Presented by: Sudeep
- No. of days: 112
- No. of housemates: 18
- Winner: Pratham
- Runner-up: Keerthi Kumar
- No. of episodes: 113

Release
- Original network: Colors Kannada
- Original release: 9 October 2016 – 29 January 2017

Series chronology
- ← Previous; Season 3 Next → Season 5

Bigg Boss 4 is the fourth season of the Kannada-language version of Indian reality television series Bigg Boss premiered on 9 October 2016 on Colors Kannada at 6pm. Sudeep remained as the host as he hosted previous seasons.

Among the five finalists, Pratham emerged as the winner with the highest number of public votes, followed by Kirik Keerthi as runner-up, and Rekha, Malavika Avinash and Mohan Shankar as third, fourth and fifth respectively. Nagendra bhat was the writer for this season.

== Production ==
Sudeep had signed a ₹18 crore (US$1.9 million) deal with the channel Colors Kannada to host the next five seasons starting from the previous season. The first promo for the show aired on the channel on 8 September 2016. None of the contestants' details were revealed until the grand opening of the show. The Bigg Boss house built for the previous season in the Innovative Film City at Bidadi, Bengaluru was reconstructed for this season.

The show was aired on Colors Kannada and Colors Kannada HD simultaneously from 9:00 pm to 10:00 om every day. This was the first season of Bigg Boss Kannada to be shot and aired in High-Definition. A spin-off show, Bigg Boss Night Shift was produced and aired on Colors Super from 10:00 pm to 11:00 pm every day. This contained unseen footage from the original airing and was hosted by Rehman Haseeb, alumnus from Season 3 of Bigg Boss Kannada.

The season was extended by two weeks (to 113 days) instead of the regular 98 days format of the show. The first 98 days of Season 4 was aired on Colors Kannada while the remaining 14 days were aired exclusively on Colors Super channel. The grand finale was aired on 28 and 29 January 2017 on Colors Kannada, Colors Kannada HD and Colors Super simultaneously.

== Housemates status ==
Sr	Housemate	Day entered	Day exited	Status
1	Pratham	Day 1	Day 112	Winner
2	Keerthi	Day 1	Day 112	1st runner-up
3	Rekha	Day 1	Day 112	2nd runner-up
4	Malvika	Day 1	Day 111	3rd runner-up
5	Mohan	Day 1	Day 111	4th runner-up
6	Shalini	Day 1	Day 28	Secret Room
6	Shalini	Day 35	Day 109	Evicted
7	Bhuvan	Day 1	Day 91	Evicted
8	Sheetal	Day 1	Day 28	Evicted
8	Sheetal	Day 35	Day 84	Evicted
9	Sanjana	Day 1	Day 77	Evicted
10	Karunya	Day 1	Day 42	Evicted
10	Karunya	Day 45	Day 70	Evicted
11	Sukrutha	Day 50	Day 70	Evicted
12	Mastan	Day 50	Day 63	Evicted
13	Niranjan	Day 1	Day 56	Evicted
14	Om	Day 1	Day 49	Evicted
15	Kavya	Day 1	Day 35	Evicted
16	Chaitra	Day 1	Day 21	Evicted
17	Ganesh	Day 1	Day 14	Evicted
18	Vanishree	Day 1	Day 7	Evicted

== Housemates ==
1. Kirik Keerthi program producer and a reporter in Kannada news channels.
2. Pratham is a film director.
3. Malavika Avinash, An Indian actress, television personality and politician.
4. Sheetal Shetty is a news anchor who presented news shows and discussions on TV9 and BTV News.
5. Kavya Shastri is a television presenter and a serial actress. She has hosted numerous TV shows and acted in the serial 'Shubha Vivaha' that aired on Zee Kannada.
6. Bhuvan Ponnanna is a model and an alumnus of reality show 'Indian' that was broadcast on ETV Kannada.
7. Sanjana Chidanand is a model and a serial actress.
8. Chaitra is a singer who has sung various songs in Kannada films
9. Dodda Ganesh is a retired cricketer who played in international level and a politician under Janata Dal (Secular).
10. Vanishree is a serial actress who has acted in several serials and films.
11. Niranjan Deshpande is a show host, Radio Jockey, and an actor. He has acted both in daily serials and movies.
12. Karunya Ram is an actress, who is well known for her role in Vajrakaya, Kiragoorina Gayyaligalu and Eradu Kanasu.
13. Mohan Shankar is an actor, comedian and director who has acted in few films.
14. Sparsha Rekha is an actress known for her role in film Sparsha and Majestic
15. Shalini Satyanarayan is a serial actress

== Wild-card entries ==
1. Om Prakash Rao is a film director and comedian in Kannada.
2. Sukrutha Wagle, is an Indian actress, she is well noted for her role in the film Bahuparak and Kiragoorina Gayyaligalu.
3. Masthan Chandra is an actor, debuting with Devayani, a movie of his own production, currently under development.
