= Samyuktha Hegde =

Indian actress

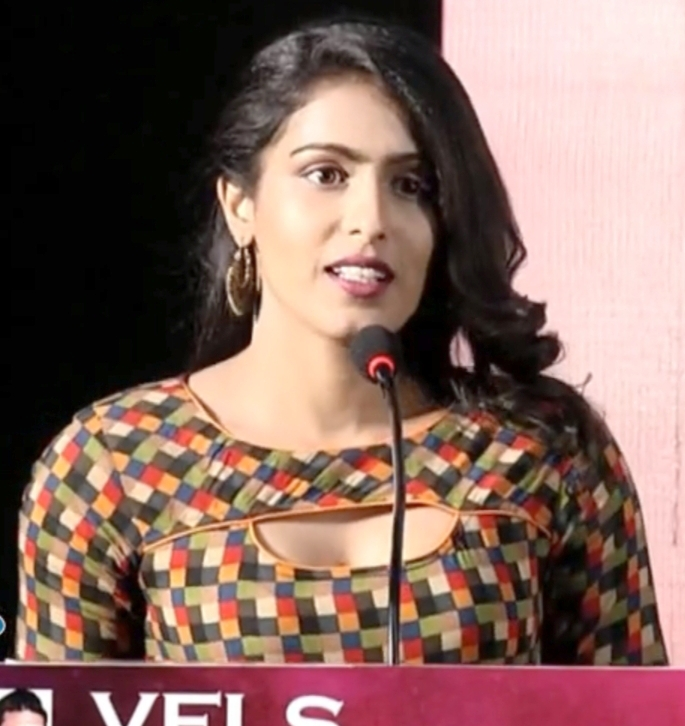
- Hegde in 2019
- Born: 17 July 1998 (age 28); Bangalore, Karnataka, India
- Occupation: Actress
- Years active: 2016–present

Samyuktha Hegde (born 17 July 1998) is an Indian actress who predominantly works in Kannada and Tamil films. Hegde made her film debut with the 2016 Kannada film Kirik Party, which earned her the Filmfare Award for Best Supporting Actress – Kannada. She later participated in Bigg Boss Kannada (2017) and MTV Splitsvilla 11 (2018), and emerged as the first runner-up of the latter show.

== Early and personal life ==
Hegde was born in Bangalore to a Christian mother and a Hindu Brahmin father. Her native village is Kelaginamane, a place in the Uttara Kannada district. She did her schooling from St. Paul's English School. She discontinued her degree course in BA psychology and journalism in Jain University, Bangalore to continue pursuing dancing and acting.

Since 2019, Hegde has been in a relationship with Chris Sauer, a German national.

== Career ==
In 2016, Hegde was cast as a parallel female lead in Rakshit Shetty's comedy-drama Kirik Party. Impressed by her Facebook profile, the makers called her for an audition that she subsequently cleared. The film received critical acclaim and emerged a major commercial success. Hegde's performance playing the love interest of Shetty's character won praise for Hegde; a reviewer for The Times of India stated that "Samyuktha Hegde, as the bubbly Aarya, has a tough act to follow given the peppy first half and impresses by holding her own in crucial scenes", while The New Indian Express's reviewer felt that Hegde "outshone in the film along with the main character Karna".

In 2016, Hegde appeared as a contestant in the reality television show MTV Roadies. She said that being a part of the show had been her childhood dream. In 2018, Hegde entered MTV Splitsvilla in its eleventh season as a wild card entrant and became the Runner up of the season. In 2019, she made her debut in Tamil film through Comali opposite to Jayam Ravi and Kajal Agarwal. Her role as Nikitha, was praised by all the audiences, though her role was minimum in the film. She learned Tamil language for the film and dubbed on her own. After that she packed more films in Tamil film industries.

== Media image ==
In the Bangalore Times Most Desirable Women list, Hegde was placed 9th in 2017, 13th in 2018 and 21st in 2020.

== Filmography ==
Key
†	Denotes films that have not yet been released

=== Films ===
Year	Title	Role	Language	Notes	Ref.
2016	Kirik Party	T. Arya	Kannada		
2017	College Kumar	Keerthi	Kannada		
2018	Kirrak Party	Satya	Telugu		
2019	Omme Nishyabda Omme Yuddha	Deaf Girl	Kannada		
2019	Watchman	Anitha	Tamil		
2019	Comali	Nikitha Krishnamoorthy	Tamil		
2019	Puppy	Ramya	Tamil		
2022	Theal	Thilaka	Tamil		
2022	Manmadha Leelai	Poorni	Tamil		
2022	Raana	Dancer (Herself)	Kannada	Special appearance in the Song "Malli Malli"	
2022	Thurthu Nirgamana	Sindhu	Kannada		
2024	Kreem	Aksha/ Pearl	Kannada		
2027	Power House †	TBA	Tamil	Filming	

=== Television ===
Year	Title	Role	Language	Notes	Ref.
2017	Bigg Boss Kannada 5	Contestant	Kannada	12th place	
2017	MTV Roadies 14	Contestant	Hindi	8th place	
2018	MTV Splitsvilla 11	Contestant	Hindi	MTV India	1st runner up

=== Web series ===
Year	Title	Role	Notes	Ref.
2021	Puncch Beat	Meesha	Season 2	
2025	Reality Ranis of the Jungle 2	Contestant	10th place	

== Awards and nominations ==
Year	Award	Category	Work	Result	Ref.
2017	Filmfare Awards South	Best Supporting Actress – Kannada	Kirik Party	Won	
2017	South Indian International Movie Awards	Best Female Debut – Kannada	Kirik Party	Nominated	
