= Bigg Boss Kannada season 5 =

Season of television series

Bigg Boss Kannada
- Season 5
- Season 5 eye logo
- Presented by: Sudeep
- No. of days: 105
- No. of housemates: 20
- Winner: Chandan Shetty
- Runner-up: Diwakar
- No. of episodes: 106

Release
- Original network: Colors Super
- Original release: 15 October 2017 – 28 January 2018

Series chronology
- ← Previous; Season 4 Next → Season 6

Bigg Boss 5 is the fifth season of the Kannada-language version of Indian reality television series Bigg Boss premiered on 15 October 2017. Sudeep reprised his role as the host of the show.

The finale of the season took place 28 January 2018, and rapper Chandan Shetty was declared the winner of the show and was awarded the prize money of ₹50 lakh. Sales representative Diwaker was voted the runner-up.

== Production ==
Sudeep had signed a ₹20 crore (US$2.1 million) deal with the channel Colors Kannada to host the next five seasons starting from the previous season. During the grand finale of Season 4, it was announced that the next season will start with new contestants and a renovated Bigg Boss house built for the previous season in the Innovative Film City at Bidadi, Bangalore. This will be the first season to allow non-celebrities to the Bigg Boss house with online auditions taking place from July 2017.

The application process of the auditions for non-celebrities was exclusively carried by mobile app called Voot. Nagendra Bhat Bilalige (Naabhi) was the reality writer for this season.

The show was extended by one week (106 days) instead of 98 days. Among the five finalists Niveditha and Diwakar are auditioned contestants, where as Chandan, Karthik and Shruti are celebrities.

== Housemates status ==
Sr	Housemate	Day entered	Day exited	Status
1	Chandan	Day 1	Day 106	Winner
2	Diwakar	Day 1	Day 106	1st runner-up
3	Kartik	Day 1	Day 106	2nd runner-up
4	Niveditha	Day 1	Day 105	3rd runner-up
5	Shruthi	Day 1	Day 105	4th runner-up
6	Sameer	Day 1	Day 101	Evicted
7	Anupama	Day 1	Day 98	Evicted
8	Riyaz	Day 1	Day 91	Evicted
9	Krishi	Day 1	Day 35	Evicted
9	Krishi	Day 42	Day 84	Evicted
10	Jaya	Day 1	Day 77	Evicted
11	Lasya	Day 58	Day 70	Evicted
12	Samyuktha	Day 58	Day 66	Guest; Ejected
13	Jagan	Day 1	Day 63	Evicted
14	Ashitha	Day 1	Day 56	Evicted
15	Vaishnavi	Day 50	Day 54	Walked
16	Chandru	Day 1	Day 49	Evicted
17	Tejaswini	Day 1	Day 23	Walked
17	Tejaswini	Day 26	Day 28	Evicted
18	Dayal	Day 1	Day 21	Evicted
19	Megha	Day 1	Day 14	Evicted
20	Suma	Day 1	Day 7	Evicted

== Housemates ==
Along with the usual celebrity contestants, the housemates of this season includes contestants selected through online audition process. The total of 17 housemates include 11 celebrities and 6 commoners. Nagendra bhat bilalige was the writer for this season.

Housemates	Occupation	Ref.
Chandan Shetty	Rapper	
Diwakar	Sales representative	
Karthik Jayaram	Television and film actor	
Niveditha Gowda	Student	
Shruti Prakash	Singer and television actress	
Sameer Acharya	Priest	
Anupama Gowda	Television actress	
Riaz Basha	Radio jockey	
Krishi Thapanda	Model and actress	
Jaya Sreenivasan	Numerologist	
Jagannath Chandrashekhar	Television actor	
Ashitha Chandrappa	Television actress	
Sihi Kahi Chandru	Actor and television presenter	
Tejaswini Prakash	Film and television actress	
Dayal Padmanabhan	Film director, producer and actor	
Megha	Student	
Suma Rajkumar	Homemaker and ventriloquist	

=== Wild-card entries ===
Housemate	Occupation	Contestant type
Vaishnavi Chandran Menon	Film actress	Wild card Contestant
Lasya Nagaraj	Actress	Wild card Contestant
Samyuktha Hegde	Actress	Long-term Guest

Three contestants entered the house through wild cards. Presenter Akul Balaji was the second entrant who promoted his new dance reality television reality show Master Dancer. Actresses Lasya and Samyuktha Hegde were the final two entrants. Hegde was evicted from the house a few days later after she assaulted Sameer Acharya for allegedly touching her inappropriately. However, later she admitted in the confession room that Acharya was not at fault and that she reacted at the "heat of the moment".

=== Celebrities claim to fame ===
- Shruti Prakash – television actress and singer. She is known for her role of Sita Modi in the Star Plus popular show Saath Nibhaana Saathiya which starred Devoleena Bhattacharjee and Mohammad Nazim.
- Karthik Jayaram – Actor, Model and engineer. He is known for appearing in many Sandalwood films like Varadanayaka and Care of Footpath 2. He also is well known for playing Ravana in Star Plus popular show Siya Ke Ram.
- Tejaswini Prakash – Actress and model. She is known for appearing in Sandalwood films like Savi Savi Nenapu and Preethi Nee Heegeke.
- Krishi Thapanda – Model and actress. She is known for making her kannada film debut with Akira in 2016 with Anish Tejeshwar.
- Chandan Shetty – Rapper. He is known for singing many songs for Sandalwood films.
- Sihi Kahi Chandru – Television actor and presenter. He appeared in many Sandalwood films like Jhossh, Julie, Naanu Nanna Kanasu. He also played the main lead in the show Sihi Kahi.
- Samyuktha Hegde – Actress. She is known for appearing in the Sandalwood film Kirik Party. She participated in MTV Roadies.

== Episodes ==
The episodes were broadcast on Colors Super between 8:00 and 9:30 p.m. (IST) daily. The episodes and highlights were also released on the website and app Voot after the telecast.

	Monday	Tuesday	Wednesday	Thursday	Friday	Saturday	Sunday
Event	Captaincy Task; Nominations	Weekly task				Varada Kathe Kicchana Jothe and Eviction	Super Sunday with Sudeepa and Kicchan time

== Nominations table ==
	Week 1	Week 2	Week 3	Week 4	Week 5	Week 6	Week 7	Week 8	Week 9	Week 10	Week 11	Week 12	Week 13	Week 14	Week 15 Final	
House Captain	Anupama	Shruti	Sameer	Riaz	Chandan	Nivedita	Karthik	Jagan	Krishi	None	Riaz	Sameer	Anupama	None		
Captain's Nomination	Niveditha	Karthik	Anupama	Karthik	Riaz	Chandru	Diwakar	None	Sameer	None	Diwakar	Anupama	Chandan	None		
Vote to:	Evict	Save	Evict		Save	Evict		-	Evict	-	Evict			-		
			Niveditha; Dayal	Anupama; Chandru	House; Captain	Shruti; Riaz	Diwakar; Niveditha	No; Nominations	Chandan	Samyuktha; Krishi	Jaya; Karthik	Karthik; Shruti	Shruti; Riaz			Winner (Day 106)
			Niveditha; Chandru	Tejaswini; Jagan	Jagan; Krishi	Shruti; Anupama	Chandan; Ashitha	No; Nominations	Diwakar	Anupama; Niveditha		Secret; Room	Niveditha; Riaz			1st runner-up (Day 106)
			Riaz; Jaya	Niveditha; Jay	Riaz; Diwakar	Riaz; Jaya	House; Captain	No; Nominations	Jagan	Samyuktha; Niveditha	Sameer; Niveditha	Riaz; Chandan	Diwakar; Sameer			2nd runner-up (Day 106)
			Dayal; Jaya	Jagan; Anupama	Anupama; Ashitha	House; Captain	Chandan; Jaya	No; Nominations	Chandan	Sameer; Sreenivasan	Jaya; Krishi	Shruti; Krishi	Karthik; Riaz			3rd runner-up (Day 105)
			Niveditha; Riaz	Niveditha; Sameer	Niveditha; Riaz	Chandan; Anupama	Chandru; Jagan	No; Nominations	Shruti	Sameer; Diwakar	Sameer; Niveditha	Niveditha; Riaz	Sameer; Niveditha			4th runner-up (Day 105)
			House; Captain	Chandru; Tejaswini	Chandru; Jagan	Jaya; Shruti	Riaz; Anupama	No; Nominations	Diwakar	Samyuktha; Anupama	Krishi; Shruti	House; Captain	Shruti; Karthik		Evicted (Day 99)	
			Riaz; Jaya	~~Sameer~~; ~~Chandan~~	Niveditha; Riaz	Sameer; Chandan	Ashitha; Jagan	No; Nominations	Shruti	Sameer; Diwakar	Sameer; Niveditha	Riaz, Niveditha	House; Captain		Evicted (Day 98)	
			Dayal; Anupama	House; Captain	Ashitha; Krishi	Shruti; Jagan	Sameer; Ashitha	No; Nominations	Jaya	Niveditha; Shruti	House; Captain	Krishi; Anupama	Niveditha; Chandan	Evicted (Day 91)		
			Jaya; Riaz	Sreenivasan, Sameer	Riaz; Jaya	Evicted (Day 35)	Shruti; Anupama	No; Nominations	House; Captain	Sameer; Chandan	Sameer; Niveditha	Niveditha; Riaz	Evicted (Day 84)			
			Dayal; Jagan	Jagan; Chandru	Chandru; Karthik	Chandru; Jagan	Niveditha; Shruti	No; Nominations	Jaya	Lasya; Niveditha	Chandan; Diwakar	Evicted (Day 77)				
	Not In House								Exempt	Jaya; Sameer	Evicted (Day 70)					
	Not In House								Exempt	Sameer; Jaya	Ejected (Day 66)					
	Not In House							Walked (Day 54)								
			Jaya; Riaz	Jaya; Niveditha	Riaz; Niveditha	Chandan; Sameer	Ashitha; Anupama	House; Captain	Jagan	Evicted (Day 63)						
Notes	1	2	3	4	5	6	7	8	9	10	11	12	13	14	15	
Against public vote	Ayesha Pavan Sanjjana Thanuja Ramu				Ashitha; Chandru; Diwakar; Jagan; Krishi; Niveditha	Anupama; Chandan; Chandru; Jagan; Jaya; Riaz; Sameer; Shruti	Chandru; Diwakar; Jaya; Krishi; Riaz; Sameer	All Housemates	Chandan; Diwakar; Jagan; Jaya; Sameer; Shruti	Anupama; Diwakar; Jaya; Lasya; Niveditha; Sameer; Samyuktha	Diwakar; Jaya; Krishi; Niveditha; Sameer	Anupama; Karthik; Krishi; Niveditha; Riaz; Shruti	Chandan; Karthik; Niveditha; Riaz; Sameer; Shruti	Anupama; Chandan; Diwakar; Karthik; Niveditha; Sameer; Shruti	Chandan; Diwakar; Karthik; Niveditha; Shruti	
Re-entered	none			Tejaswini	none		Krishi	none								
Walked	none			Tejaswini	none			Vaishnavi	none							
Ejected	none									Samyuktha	none					
Evicted	Suma	Megha	Dayal	Tejaswini	Krishi	No eviction	Chandru	Ashitha	Jagan	Lasya	Jaya	Krishi	Riaz	Anupama	Shruti; Fewest votes (out of 5)	Niveditha; Fewest votes (out of 4)
Evicted	Suma	Megha	Dayal	Tejaswini	Krishi	No eviction	Chandru	Ashitha	Jagan	Lasya	Jaya	Krishi	Riaz	Sameer	Karthik; Fewest votes (out of 3)	
Evicted	Suma	Megha	Dayal	Tejaswini	Krishi	No eviction	Chandru	Ashitha	Jagan	Lasya	Jaya	Krishi	Riaz	Sameer	Diwakar; Fewest votes (out of 2)	Chandan; Most votes to win

=== Notes ===
This housemate was the current House Captain.
This Housemate was directly nominated for eviction by Bigg Boss.
This Housemate was granted immunity from nominations.
This Housemate was Ejected from the house.

- ^1: As the captain, Anupama had the power to directly nominate one housemate, and she picked Niveditha's name for eviction.
- ^2: Chandru had a Special Adhikara to nominate 3 housemates instead of two. Captain Shruti had the power to save one nominated housemate, and she decided to save Karthik.
- ^3: Diwakar and Shruti were directly nominated by Bigg Boss. Sameer became the first captain as a commoner. Anupama was directly nominated by Sameer.
- ^4: Sameer had a Special Adhikara to nullify the nominations made by one housemate, and he chose to nullify the nominations made by Anupama. Karthik was directly nominated by Captain Riaz. Tejaswini walked out of the house due to her father's health condition. She re-entered the house a day later.
- ^5: An open nomination process took place in the garden area in Week 5. But Karthik exercised his Super Adhikara by nominating two people in the confession room. Captain Chandan had the power to save one nominated housemate, and he decided to save Riaz.
- ^6: On account of winning the General Knowledge quiz, Niveditha became the youngest captain in the history of Bigg Boss Kannada. Chandru was directly nominated by Niveditha for eviction. There was no eviction in Week 6. Krishi re-entered the Bigg Boss House as a wild card contestant.
- ^7: Karthik became the captain of the house. The housemates were asked to nominate two people whom they want to save this week. Diwakar was directly nominated by Karthik for eviction.
- ^8: Jagan became the captain of the house. Vaishnavi enters the house as a wild card contestant. Except for Jagan and Vaishnavi, all the other housemates are directly nominated for eviction by Bigg Boss. Vaishnavi exited the house on Day 54 due to recurring health issues.
- ^9: Krishi became the new captain of the house. While Lasya Nagraj entered the house as a wild card contestant, Samyuktha Hegde entered as a guest. Sameer was directly nominated by Krishi for eviction.
- ^10: Bigg Boss announced that a captain will not be appointed this week. The women nominate two male housemates; the men nominate two female housemates. Karthik exercised his Super Adhikara to directly nominate Lasya. Samyuktha was ejected from the house for assaulting her fellow housemate, Sameer.
- ^11: Riaz became the captain for the second time and uses his powers to directly nominate Diwakar. Jaya is sent to the secret room. Sameer is evicted in a surprise midnight eviction, but he too joins Jaya in the secret room.
- ^12: Diwakar is sent to the secret room. Riaz exercises his Super Adhikara to nominate Krishi, Anupama, Shruti, and Karthik. Sameer becomes the captain for the second time and directly nominates Anupama for eviction.
- ^13: Anupama becomes the captain and directly nominates Chandan for eviction. Shruti exercises her Super Adhikara to learn the nominations made by Chandan and Riaz.
- ^14: All the housemates are nominated for eviction this week. As a result, a captain was not appointed as well.
- ^15: Sameer was the last housemate to be evicted before the finale. As a result, Niveditha, Chandan, Shruti, Diwakar, and Karthik qualify for the finale as the Top 5 finalists.
