= Bigg Boss Kannada =

Indian reality television series

- Bigg Boss Season 13 poster with host Sudeepa
- Presented by: Sudeepa
- Country of origin: India
- Original language: Kannada
- No. of seasons: 13
- No. of episodes: 1241

Production
- Production locations: Lonavala (Season 1 & 2); Bengaluru (Season 3–12)
- Camera setup: Multi-camera
- Production company: Endemol India

Original release
- Network: ETV Kannada (Season 1); Asianet Suvarna (Season 2); Colors Kannada (Season 3, 4, 7–12); Colors Super (Season 5 & 6)
- Release: 24 March 2013 – present

Related
- Bigg Boss OTT

Bigg Boss Kannada, also known as BBK, is the Kannada version of the reality TV show Bigg Boss, which is broadcast in India through the Colors Kannada channel. The show is produced by Endemol Shine India, which owns the global format of Big Brother. Kiccha Sudeepa was hired to host the reality show in 2013 for the first season on ETV Kannada (now Colors Kannada). Later, he continued as a host of the show.

== Overview ==
=== The 'Bigg Boss' house ===
A 'Bigg Boss' House is constructed for every season. For the first two seasons, the house was located in Lonavala, in the Pune district of Maharashtra, where the Hindi version of Bigg Boss usually takes place. As the schedules for the Hindi and Kannada versions were expected to overlap, a house exclusively for the Kannada version was built at Innovative Film City in Bengaluru, Karnataka for the third season. This continued to be the location of the house for subsequent seasons of Bigg Boss Kannada. Each house built for a season of Bigg Boss is retained until the start of next season and is open to the public as an attraction.

The house is usually well-furnished and decorated, with modern amenities and a large, common bedroom for all contestants. The house would also have toilets, a swimming pool, gymnasium and spacious gardens. There are show-specific activity areas and a small sound-proof room with controlled entrance called the 'confession room', where the housemates are called in by the Bigg Boss for the nomination process and other conversations. Starting from the second season, there was also a luxurious single bedroom for the captain. This season also introduced a secret room with bed and other facilities, where an evicted contestant, if selected by the Bigg Boss to continue the game, would be retained for a week or two and then returned to the show.

The house has no television connection (except for the day where the show host Sudeep converses with the contestants through the TV), telephones, Internet access, clocks or writing equipment, complying with worldwide rules of Big Brother.

The house was reduced to ashes on 22 February 2018, and had to be rebuilt for the sixth season.

=== The 'Eye' logo ===
Each season gets its own 'Eye' logo similar to the Bigg Boss and Big Brother shows. The first season of Bigg Boss Kannada on ETV Kannada inherited its logo from the sixth season of its Hindi counterpart in the form of a human eye with an eyeball displaying the SMPTE color bars, against a purple background with lightning storm. The second season moved to Suvarna TV and had a dedicated logo in the form of a more detailed human eye against a background which split the 'hot' (orange) and 'cold' (blue) sides of the personalities in the house. This logo also had the text 'Season 2' inserted below the eye. The third season returned to the previous broadcaster, then re-branded as Colors Kannada, and the logo was adapted from the first season version; it used a purple background with a tornado and the season number was not mentioned.

The fourth season logo featured a futuristic design, with different elements inside the eye, against a background that uses tech elements and logos from the previous season on a dominant blue color. It was partially derived from the eye used for the season 15 of Big Brother UK. The logo used for the fifth season of Bigg Boss Kannada was adapted from season 14 of Big Brother UK; it shows a pile of old television sets displaying the SMPTE bars hanging at the center from the top, surrounded by multicolored doors, cupboards, lights and windows forming the shape of an eye against a background of an overcast sky with fireworks. For the sixth season, an 'ice-fire' theme was adopted for the logo while the seventh season's logo was adapted from season 20 of Celebrity Big Brother UK.

=== House rules ===
While not all the rules have ever been disclosed to the audience, the most prominent ones are clearly seen. The inmates should talk in Kannada at all times, although minimal use of English is allowed. The property of the house, including the electronic equipment and the furniture, should not be tampered with or damaged by the housemates. The housemates cannot leave the house premises at any time except when permitted. Sleeping is only allowed when the lights go off in the night. Liquor is forbidden and housemates can only smoke in the smoking area. A housemate can not assault another housemate physically; if they do so, they will be eliminated from the house.

=== Nomination ===
Nomination is a mandatory activity, usually taking place on first day of the week in which all housemates need to take part unless directed by Bigg Boss. Each housemate nominates two other housemates for eviction. Housemates receiving the most nomination votes are nominated for eviction from the house and undergo a public vote (through SMS). On the weekend episode, usually the one contestant with the lowest vote will be evicted from the house. A housemate may also be directly nominated for eviction by that week's captain of the house or for other reasons by the Bigg Boss. Housemates who are awarded 'immunity' cannot be nominated by other contestants. Immunity is automatically given to the week's captain and can be earned by contestants through winning specific tasks or achieving secret tasks given by Bigg Boss. Sometimes, the captain can make a contestant immune from nomination upon Bigg Boss' direction. The housemates are not allowed to discuss the nominations or the nomination process with each other.

=== House captaincy ===
The captaincy concept was introduced in the second season. A captain is selected for every week by Bigg Boss through specific tasks or elected by the housemates. The captain has additional privileges in the form of immunity from nomination that week, exemption from participating in the task activities, and a separate bedroom with more facilities more than those of other contestants. The captain is exempt from nomination that week and has the power to either nominate a housemate directly, make a housemate immune from nomination or rescue a nominated housemate, depending on Bigg Boss' decisions. The captain's main duty is to supervise the weekly task, making sure its conditions are met and the task is performed well to procure a 'luxury budget' for the next week. Captains should also keep an eye on house rules and may punish a housemate for violating the rules.

=== Broadcast ===
Bigg Boss Kannada premiered on ETV Kannada, with the second season airing on Star Suvarna. Seasons three and four were broadcast on Colors Kannada, while seasons five and six aired on Colors Super. From the seventh season onwards, Bigg Boss Kannada was aired on Colors Kannada and was also made available for streaming on Voot. Each day's episodes contain the main events of the previous day. Every Sunday episode mainly focuses on an interview of the evicted contestant by the host. For the seventh season the eviction process was changed to the Saturday episode.

== Season summaries ==
Season 1

=== Season 1 ===
The first season of Bigg Boss Kannada was launched in 2013 and derived many of its concepts from the sixth season of the original Bigg Boss including the visual elements and the house itself, with slight alterations. 'Howdu Swami!' ('Yes Sir!') was adopted as the slogan for this season and the theme song for the show was sung by Vijay Prakash. The show was aired on ETV Kannada from Mondays to Saturdays from 8 pm to 9 pm, premiering on 24 March 2013. The tasks and house activities would take place from Mondays to Thursdays following a special episode on Fridays, 'Varada Kathe Kicchana Jothe' ('The Week's Story with Kiccha') in which the show's host Sudeep would appear and carryout the eviction for the week. Sudeep's appearance would continue on the next day's special episode, 'Super Saturday with Sudeep' where an interview of the evicted contestant and a promotion for an upcoming movie would take place with a celebrity guest on the stage with Sudeep. The programming that included the unseen content, 'Bigg Boss Unseen' was aired from 11 pm to 12 am on weeknights. A marathon of all the episodes of the week would run on Sundays from morning. All the episodes were available online on YouTube and the official website of Bigg Boss Kannada after the original airing. The finale of the show was aired on 30 June 2013. Post conclusion of the season, a spin-off programming 'Bigg Boss Autograph' was aired on the same time-slot which consisted of interviews on the journey of fellow contestants in the show. As of date, the episodes from this season are not available online.

Season 2

=== Season 2 ===
The second season moved to Asianet Suvarna and was launched in 2014. A new logo and a house exclusive to the Kannada version were created for this season along with a new theme song, with Vijay Prakash reprising his singing role. The slogan for this season was 'Thamashene Alla!' ('Not a Joke at all!'). The season premiered on 29 June 2014 with many new elements getting introduced, including the house captaincy. The programming was increased by a day to include Sundays and the weekly activities would take place from Mondays to Fridays from this season. Eviction episodes with Sudeep, 'Kicchinca Kathe Kicchana Jothe' ('Igniting Story with Kiccha') was aired on Saturdays followed by special episodes for interviews and movie promotions 'Sakkath Sunday with Sudeep' on Sundays. The unseen content for the season, 'Innu Ide Nodi Swami!' ('There's more to watch, Sir!') was aired from 11 pm to 12 am on weeknights. A marathon of all the episodes of the week would run on Sundays from morning. All the episodes were available online on YouTube and the official website of Suvarna after the original airing. The finale of the show was aired on 5 October 2014. After the season concluded, 'Bigg Boss Autograph' was aired on the same time-slot. As of date, the episodes from this season are not available online.

Season 3

=== Season 3 ===
The third season returned to the previous broadcaster, then re-branded to Colors Kannada from ETV Kannada. This was the first season to take place inside Karnataka, in a house bigger than the previous ones, built exclusively for the Kannada version at the Innovative Film City in Bengaluru. The season used many elements including the theme song and the logo with slight modifications from the first season. The season was also the first one to omit unseen content programming and online voting. The season premiered on 25 October 2015 and 'Naatakakke Illi Jaaga Illa!' ('There is no place for drama here!') was the slogan of this season. As with the usual format, the episodes would be aired from Mondays to Sundays, this time an hour later than the previous seasons. The time-slot from the third season has been 9 pm to 10 pm on weeknights. The eviction episode, 'Varada Kathe Kicchana Jothe' ('The Week's Story with Kiccha') returned and was aired on Saturdays and continued with 'Super Sunday with Sudeep' on Sundays. The 'Bigg Boss Autograph' for Season 3 was hosted by Rishika Singh, alumna of the first season of Bigg Boss Kannada. The show's finale was aired on 31 January 2016. The episodes from this season were not available online after the airing, however were later made available on Voot platform.

Season 4

=== Season 4 ===
The fourth season was aired on Colors Kannada and Colors Kannada HD and was the first season to broadcast the episodes in high-definition format. 'Kandiro Mukhagala Kanade Iro Mukha!' ('Unseen faces of the seen faces!') was the tagline for this season. The season premiered on 9 October 2016 with the same time-slot as of previous season. The format was same as that of previous season, with the same weekend programming with slight alteration in the Sunday's 'Super Sunday with Sudeepa'. The online voting was omitted for this season too but the unseen content was given more importance and a spin-off programming named 'Bigg Boss Night Shift' was aired on Colors Kannada's sister channel Colors Super from 10 pm to 11 pm every day. This show acted as the supplement for the main show and contained unseen footage with commentary. The spin-off was hosted by Rehman Haseeb, the Bigg Boss alumnus from 3rd Season. Also, on the Viacom 18's OTT platform Voot, two exclusive short-shows (referred to as Voot Shorts) were being streamed; both hosted by Rehman. 'Doddmane Suddi' ('News from the Big House') highlighted the events of the day's show before going on air and 'Theremareya Kathe' ('Story behind the Scenes') showed the unseen footage from the show which are not aired on the original episodes. Rehman also hosted a 30-minute interview about the in-house experience of the evicted contestants every weekend in 'Just Maath Maathalli' ('Just in the Talks'), yet another Voot exclusive show. The show was extended for two weeks and the finale took place on 29 January 2017. The final 14 episodes were aired on Colors Super and the finale was simulcast on Colors Kannada, Colors Kannada HD and Colors Super. The 'Bigg Boss Autograph' for this season was hosted by Niranjan Deshpande, an alumnus from the same season. All the episodes were made available online on Voot platform after original airing.

Season 5

=== Season 5 ===
The fifth season was moved to Colors Super and premiered on 15 October 2017. The show duration was increased by 30 minutes from this season and the episodes were aired throughout the week from 8:00 pm to 9:30 pm. The major addition to this season was that the housemates included contestants from the public, selected through audition process along with the celebrities. The format of the show continued to be the same as that of previous seasons while the Sunday's episode had a major change. The 'Super Sunday with Sudeepa' episodes included a special segment called 'Kicchan Time' ('Kiccha's / Kitchen Time'), a cookery show in which Sudeep, the host cooks with the celebrity guests invited for promotions. Unseen content was not aired on TV for this season and was made exclusive to Voot platform with two short-shows 'Unseen Avantara' ('Unseen Nuisance') / 'Unseen Kathegalu' ('Unseen Stories') and 'Deep Agi Nodi' ('Watch it Deep') being produced. There was no tagline for this season and online voting was not included. The episodes in high-definition format were simulcast on Colors Kannada HD. All the episodes and daily highlights were made available on Voot platform after original airing.

Season 6

=== Season 6 ===
The sixth season premiered on 21 October 2018. All the episodes and daily highlights were made available on Voot platform after original airing. For this season, the number of auditioned contestants (commoners) increased to half of the housemate population; 9 celebrities and 9 commoners entered the house on the premiere. Integration of the show with Voot deepened with exclusive content for the platform in the form of 'Deep Agi Nodi' ('Watch it Deep'), 'Unseen Kathegalu' ('Unseen Stories'), 'Voot Weekly', 'Voot Fryday','Bigg Inn' and 'Bigg Bang'. 'Bigg Prashne' ('Bigg Question') enabled audience to ask their questions to the fellow contestants through the Voot app and selected questions would be asked by Sudeep on the Saturday episode. A major change was made to the voting for nominated contestants; voting was made exclusive on Voot from this season. Continuing its run on Colors Super, the episodes in high-definition format were simulcast on Colors Kannada HD. All the episodes and daily highlights were made available on Voot platform after original airing.

Season 7

=== Season 7 ===
The seventh season was moved back to Colors Kannada and an 'all-celebrity' model was re-introduced for the show. The show premiered on 13 October 2019 and 18 celebrity contestants entered the house. Time-slot was also pushed to 9:00 pm to 10:30 pm with high-definition simulcast on Colors Kannada HD. All the episodes and daily highlights were made available on Voot platform after original airing. Voting continued to be exclusive to Voot platform and exclusive content in the form of 'Deep Agi Nodi' ('Watch it Deep'), 'Unseen Kathegalu' ('Unseen Stories'), 'Bigg Inn', 'Voot Weekly' and 'Voot Fryday' were produced. It was made possible for the audience to choose the Friday task for the contestants through 'Voot Fryday'; audience were also able to record and send a video of themselves sharing their opinions on the fellow contestants through 'Video Vichaara', through the Voot app and selected videos would be shown on the TV inside the Bigg Boss house. Another change was brought to the eviction episode where on the Saturday episode, the saved contestants would be declared, reducing the nominated contestants to 2 or 3 of which one would be evicted on the Sunday episode as opposed to the previous seasons where the evictions used to happen on the Saturday episode.

Season 8

=== Season 8 ===
Season 9

=== Season 9 ===
Season 10

=== Season 10 ===
Season 11

=== Season 11 ===
Season 12

=== Season 12 ===
Season 13

== Series details ==
| Series | Host | House Location | Episodes | | Originally released | | | Days | Housemates | Prize Money | Winner | Runner-up |
| Series | Host | House Location | Episodes | | First released | Last released | Network | Days | Housemates | Prize Money | Winner | Runner-up |
|---|---|---|---|---|---|---|---|---|---|---|---|---|
| 1 | Sudeepa | Lonavala | 99 | | 24 March 2013 | 30 June 2013 | ETV Kannada | 98 | 15 | ₹50 lakh (US$52,000) | Vijay Raghavendra | Arun Sagar |
| 2 | Sudeepa | Lonavala | 99 | | 29 June 2014 | 5 October 2014 | Star Suvarna | 98 | 15 | ₹50 lakh (US$52,000) | Akul Balaji | Srujan Lokesh |
| 3 | Sudeepa | Bengaluru | 99 | | 25 October 2015 | 31 January 2016 | Colors Kannada | 98 | 18 | ₹50 lakh (US$52,000) | Shruti | Chandan Kumar |
| 4 | Sudeepa | Bengaluru | 113 | | 9 October 2016 | 29 January 2017 | Colors Kannada | 112 | 18 | ₹50 lakh (US$52,000) | Pratham | Kirik Keerthi |
| 5 | Sudeepa | Bengaluru | 106 | | 15 October 2017 | 28 January 2018 | Colors Super | 105 | 20 | ₹50 lakh (US$52,000) | Chandan Shetty | Divakar |
| 6 | Sudeepa | Bengaluru | 99 | | 21 October 2018 | 27 January 2019 | Colors Super | 98 | 20 | ₹50 lakh (US$52,000) | Shashi Kumar | Naveen Sajju |
| 7 | Sudeepa | Bengaluru | 113 | | 13 October 2019 | 2 February 2020 | Colors Kannada | 112 | 20 | ₹50 lakh (US$52,000) | Shine Shetty | Kuri Pratap |
| 8 | Sudeepa | Bengaluru | 118 (Note: BIGG BOSS Kannada Season 8 was suspended on 8 May 2021, due to the increase in the rage of COVID-19 in India.) | 71 | 28 February 2021 | 9 May 2021 | Colors Kannada | 117 | 20 | ₹50 lakh (US$52,000) | Manju Pavagada | Aravind KP |
| 8 | Sudeepa | Bengaluru | 118 | 46 | 23 June 2021 | 8 August 2021 | Colors Kannada | 117 | 20 | ₹50 lakh (US$52,000) | Manju Pavagada | Aravind KP |
| 9 | Sudeepa | Bengaluru | 98 | | 24 September 2022 | 31 December 2022 | Colors Kannada | 98 | 18 | ₹50 lakh (US$52,000) | Roopesh Shetty | Rakesh Adiga |
| 10 | Sudeepa | Bengaluru | 112 | | 8 October 2023 | 28 January 2024 | Colors Kannada | 111 | 19 | ₹50 lakh (US$52,000) | Karthik Mahesh | Drone Prathap |
| 11 | Sudeepa | Bengaluru | 120 | | 29 September 2024 | 26 January 2025 | Colors Kannada | 119 | 20 | ₹50 lakh (US$52,000) | Hanumantha Lamani | Trivikram |
| 12 | Sudeepa | Bengaluru | 112 | | 28 September 2025 | {end date | Colors Kannada | 112 | 24 | ₹50 lakh (US$52,000) | Gilli Nata | Rakshitha Shetty |

| color15 = #1E3A45 | link15 = Bigg Boss Kannada season 13 | linkT15 = 13 | infoA15 = | infoB15 = 16 | infoC15 =₹50 lakh (US$52,000) | infoD15 = | infoE15 = | episodes15 = 112 | start15 = 6 September 2026 | end15 = }}

=== Bigg Boss Mini Season ===
| Series | Host | House Location | Episodes | Originally released | | | Days | Housemates |
| Series | Host | House Location | Episodes | First released | Last released | Network | Days | Housemates |
|---|---|---|---|---|---|---|---|---|
| 1 | Sudeepa | Bengaluru | 23 | 14 August 2021 | 21 September 2021 | Colors Kannada | 6 | 15 |

=== Bigg Boss OTT ===
| Series | Host | House Location | Episodes | Originally released | | | Days | Housemates | Prize Money | Top Performer | Champions |
| Series | Host | House Location | Episodes | First released | Last released | Network | Days | Housemates | Prize Money | Top Performer | Champions |
|---|---|---|---|---|---|---|---|---|---|---|---|
| 1 | Sudeepa | Bengaluru | 42 | 6 August 2022 | 16 September 2022 | Voot | 42 | 16 | ₹5 lakh (US$5,200) | Roopesh Shetty | Rakesh Adiga Aryavardhan Guruji, Sanya Iyer |

== Housemate summary ==
- Note: (WC) means wildcard contestant.

| Seasons | S1 | S2 | S3 | S4 | S5 | S6 | S7 | S8 | MS | OTT | S9 | S10 | S11 | S12 |
| Order of Entry | Housemates | | | | | | | | | | | | | |
|---|---|---|---|---|---|---|---|---|---|---|---|---|---|---|
| 1 | Narendra Babu Sharma | Akul Balaji | Bhavana Belagere | Pratham | Jaya Sreenivasan | Sonu Patil | Kuri Pratap | Dhanushree | Akul Balaji | Roopesh Shetty | Arun Sagar | Namratha Gowda | Bhavya Gowda | Sudhir Balraj |
| 2 | Leelavathi S M | Deepika Kamaiah | Chandan Kumar | Sheetal Shetty | Megha | Andrew Jaypaul | Priyanka Shivanna | Shubha Poonja | Kiran Raj | Aryavardhan | Mayuri Kyatari | Snehith Gowda | Yamuna Srinidhi | Kavya Shaiva |
| 3 | Arun Sagar | Laya kokolla | Huccha Venkat | Shalini Satyanarayan | Dayal Padmanabhan | Jayashree | Ravi Belagere | Shankar Ashwath | Kaustuba Mani | Rakesh Adiga | Deepika Das | Eshani Chandrashekar | Dhanraj Achar | Satish Cadaboms |
| 4 | Shwetha Pandit | Harshika Poonacha | Jayashree Ramaiah | Kirik Keerthi | Sihi Kahi Chandru | Rakesh | Chandana Ananthakrishna | Vishwanath Haveri | Chandana Ananthakrishna | Sanya Iyyer | Nawaz | Vinay Gowda | Gauthami Jadav | Gilli Nata |
| 5 | Vinayak Joshi | Santhosh | Kruthika Ravindra | Malavika Avinash | Shruthi Prakash | Murali | Vasuki Vaibhav | Vaishnavi Gowda | Prerna Kambam | Jashwanth | Divya Uruduga | Santhosh Kumar | Anusha Rai | Jhanvi R |
| 6 | Aparna | Neethu Shetty | Madhuri Itagi | Kavya Shastri | Anupama Gowda | Akshatha Pandavapura | Deepika Das | Aravind KP | Abhinav Vishwanathan | Sonu Sreenivas Gowda | Darsh Chandrapa | Neethu Vanajakshi | Dharma Keerthiraj | Dhanush Gowda |
| 7 | Anushree | Anitha Bhat | Master Anand | Bhuvan Ponnanna | Riyaz Basha | Rakshitha Rai | Jai Jagadish | Nidhi Subbaiah | Dhanush Gowda | Jayashree Aradhya | Prashant Sambaragi | Siri Sirija | Lawyer Jagdish | Chandra Prabha |
| 8 | Thilak Shekar | Srujan Lokesh | Neravanda Aiyappa | Sanjana Chidanand | Niveditha Gowda | Rapid Rashmi | Gurulinga Swamy | Geeta Bhat | Bhavya Gowda | Arjun Ramesh | Amulya Gowda | Snake Shyam | Shishir Shastry | Manju Bhashini |
| 9 | Nikitha Thukral | Rohith Patel | Neha Gowda | Chaitra | Sameer Acharya | Adam Pasha | Bhoomi Shetty | Shamanth Gowda | Vaishnavi | Lokesh | Roopesh Shetty | Bhagyashree Rao | Trivikram | Rashika Shetty |
| 10 | Vijay Raghavendra | Shweta Chengappa | Pooja Gandhi | Dodda Ganesh | Karthik Jayaram | Kavitha Gowda | Kishan Belagali | Manju Pavagada | Trivikram | Uday Surya | Saanya Iyer | Gaurish Akki | Hamsa Prathap | Abhishek Shrikanth |
| 11 | Chandrika | Mayur Patel | Tsunami Kitty | Vanishree | Ashitha Chandrappa | AV Ravi | Duniya Rashmi | Divya Suresh | Gagan Chinappa | Nandini | Vinod Gobragala | Michael Ajay | Manasa Santhosh | Mathina Mallamma |
| 12 | Jayalakshmi | Anupama Bhat | Ravi Mooruru | Niranjan Deshpande | Diwakar | Shashi Kumar | Chandan Achar | Chandrakala Mohan | Ramola | Spoorthi Gowda | Neha Gowda | Drone Pratap | Suresh | Ashvini Lakshmi |
| 13 | Rishi Kumar (WC) | Aadhi Lokesh | Rehman Haseeb | Karunya Ram | Tejaswini Prakash | Reema Das | Sujatha Satyanarayan | Raghu Gowda | Niranjan Deshpande | Chaithra Halikeri | Roopesh Rajanna | Tanisha Kuppanda | Aishwarya Shindogi | Dhruvanth Talwar |
| 14 | Rohan Gowda (WC) | Shakeela | RJ Nethra | Mohan Shankar | Chandan Shetty | Naveen Sajju | Raju Talikote | Prashanth Sambargi | Ritvvik Mathad | Somanna Machimada | Rakesh Adiga | Rakshak Sena | Chaithra Kundapura | Rakshita Shetty |
| 15 | Rishika Singh (WC) | Guruprasad (WC) | Shruthi | Rekha | Suma Rajkumar | Sneha Acharya | Chaitra Vasudevan | Divya Uruduga | Nayana | Kiran Yogeshwar | Aryavardhan | Sangeetha Sringeri | Ugram Manju | LM Karibasappa |
| 16 | Yogesh (actor) (Guest) | Bullet Prakash (Guest) | Mithra (WC) | Om Prakash Rao (WC) | Jagan Chandrashekhar | Anand Malagatti | Chaitra Kotooru | Rajeev | Yashasvini | Akshata Kukki | Aishwarya Pissay | Santhosh Varthur | Mokshith Pai | Malu Nipanal |
| 17 | Rajesh (Guest) | None | Gowthami Gowda (WC) | Sukrutha Wagle (WC) | Krishi Thapanda | Naina Puttaswamy | Shine Shetty | Nirmala Chennappa | None | | Kavyashree Gowda | Karthik Mahesh | Ranjith | Spandana Somanna |
| 18 | None | | Sushma Veer (WC) | Masthan Chandra (WC) | Vaishnavi Menon (WC) | Dhanraj | Harish Raj | Chakravarthy Chandrachud(WC) | None | | Anupama Gowda | Avinash Shetty(WC) | Hanumantha Lamani (WC) | Ashwini Gowda |
| 19 | None | | | | Lasya Nagraj (WC) | Jeevitha (WC) | RJ Prithvi (WC) | Priyanka Thimmesh(WC) | None | | None | Pavi Poovappa(WC) | Shobha Shetty (WC) | Amith Pawar |
| 20 | None | | | | Samyuktha Hegde(Guest) | Meghashree (WC) | Raksha Somashekar (WC) | Vyjayanthi Adiga (WC) | None | | None | None | Rajath Kishan (WC) | None |
| Total | 17 | 16 | 18 | 18 | 20 | 20 | 20 | 20 | 16 | 16 | 18 | 19 | 20 | 19 |
| Winner Runner-up Finalist | | | | | | | | | | | | | | |

== Bigg Boss OTT ==
The series is also set to roll out a digital version of the show called Bigg Boss OTT, which is also going to be hosted by Sudeepa and broadcast by Voot for 24×7 coverage. The series is set to launch on 6 August 2022.

== Awards and nominations ==
| Year | Award | Category | Nominee | Result |
|---|---|---|---|---|
| 2014 | ETV Kannada Anubandha Awards | Best Reality Show | Bigg Boss Kannada (Season 1) | Won |
| 2014 | GCC Media Puraksar – TV & Entertainment | Best Reality Show | Bigg Boss Kannada (Season 1) | Won |
| 2015 | Colors Kannada Anubandha Awards | Best Non-Fiction Show | Bigg Boss Kannada (Season 2) | Nominated |
| 2016 | Colors Kannada Anubandha Awards | Best Non-Fiction Show | Bigg Boss Kannada (Season 3) | Nominated |
| 2017 | Colors Kannada Anubandha Awards | Best Non-Fiction Show | Bigg Boss Kannada (Season 4) | Won |

== Sponsorship ==
Each season has grown in terms of revenue and has attracted prominent brands to sponsor the show. The sponsors receive the privilege of getting their brands advertised on the show, in the house as well as during the commercial breaks. Few tasks on the show would be designed in a way such that the brand gets advertised directly. Household articles such as pillows and coffee mugs would usually contain the branding from the sponsor. The sponsors for the show until date are listed in the table below.

| Season | Title Sponsors | Sponsors | Online Sponsors |
|---|---|---|---|
| Season 1 | Bhima Jewellers | Paragon Footwear | None |
| Season 2 | OLX.in | WeChat | Cera | None |
| Season 3 | OLX.in | Nisargalaya Brahmi Oil | Gemini Cooking Oil | Eastern Spices | None |
| Season 4 | Vaseline | Airtel 4G | McDowell's No.1 | MTR Foods | None |
| Season 5 | Vaseline | McDonald's | Fogg | MTR Foods | Cera | Black Bird | Amazon.in | Brookside Chocolates | None |
| Season 6 | None | Vaseline | Rin Detergent | McDonald's | Polycab; CottonKing | Levista Coffee | MTR Foods | Apis Honey | India Gate Classic | Fogg | Brookside Chocolates | India Gate Classic | Nestle Munch |
| Season 7 | None | Lifebuoy | Levista Coffee | Cera | Comfort Fabric Conditioner | India Gate Basmati Rice] | Haier | ace2three.com | Indeed |
| Season 8 | Wheel 2 in 1 | Freedom Refined Sunflower Oil | Lifebuoy | Nippon Paint | Fortune Chakki Fresh Atta | Levista Instant Coffee | Haier | India Gate Basmati Rice | Denver | Vimal |
| OTT | Vimal | Paytm | KFC |
| Season 9 | None | Nippon Paint | Freedom Refined Sunflower Oil | Finolex Pipes | A23 | Levista Instant Coffee | Haier | Amrith Noni | None |
| Season 10 | None | Nippon Paint | Freedom Refined Sunflower Oil | Levista Instant Coffee | Cera | Swastiks Masala | India Gate Basmati Rice | Amrith Noni | Haldiram's | Confident Group | None |

== Reception ==
The first season of the show became popular and turned out to be a TRP magnet, eventually becoming the No.1 reality show in South India.

Bigg Boss Kannada moved to Asianet's Suvarna (now under Star India) for the second season and grew even bigger in the market. The channel claimed an approximate increase of 25% in viewership and 400% in online engagement for the season. The season debuted with 6.7 TVR while averaging 5.7 TVR in its launch week and had a peak rating of 7.9 TVR during the first elimination episode of Saturday.

The show returned to Viacom 18 with Sudeep signing to host the next five seasons. The third season was aired on Colors Kannada (rebranded from ETV Kannada) and witnessed a slight fall in the TRP because of a controversy involving a fellow housemate following his immediate elimination. A year later, during the press meet for the fourth season, it was clarified that the TRP fall was a false claim and the ratings actually went up after the elimination.

The fame of the show as of fourth season reached to an extent where the film producers from the Kannada Film Industry and the Karnataka Film Chamber of Commerce held a protest in front of Innovative Film City in Bidadi, where the Bigg Boss house is located, demanding the actors not to participate or host reality shows on television, also tried to impose a ban on the show because of its popularity affecting the performances of movies in the box office.

The fifth season of the show was aired in Colors Super, the second Kannada GEC by Viacom18 to increase the viewership for the channel. The season premiered on 15 October 2017 and has been the first season to include non-celebrity housemates selected through online audition process. The grand finale was held on 28 and 29 January 2018 and Chandan Shetty emerged as the winner. Season 6 of Bigg Boss premiered on 21 October 2018 in Colors Super. After a successful season the grand finale was aired on 26 and 27 January 2019 and farmer Shashi Kumar emerged as the winner, with runner-up being singer Naveen Sajju, followed by Kavitha Gowda, Andrew Jayapaul and Rapid Rashmi in the 3rd, 4th and 5th place respectively. Sudeep was the host of this season too.
