= Omme Nishyabda Omme Yuddha =

- Directed by: Sreenag
- Written by: Sree Nag
- Produced by: Praveen raj Vijay Bolenath; V.V.N.Suresh
- Starring: Samyuktha Hegde; Prabhu Mundkur; Vijay Bolenath; Susmita Gowda; Cudavalli Chandrashekar
- Cinematography: Kalyan Sami
- Music by: Kiran Varanasi
- Production company: Rolling Dreams Entertainment
- Release date: 31 May 2019
- Running time: 120 minutes
- Country: India
- Language: Kannada

Omme Nishyabda Omme Yuddha is a 2019 Indian Kannada-language romantic drama film directed by Sreenag. The film stars Samyuktha Hegde and Prabhu Mundkur with the music composed by Kiran Varanasi.

== Plot ==
Akanksha is a simple and beautiful girl who is deaf and mute and lives in an orphanage. Adithya is a son of business tycoon Aravind. His father always runs towards money and status. But Adithya doesn’t like his father’s attitude towards life. He is very much influenced by his late mother. As per his mother's wish, Adithya leads a simple life. He is a self reliant having empathy towards down trodden and related sequences. Adithya’s father arranges a marriage proposal to him with another business tycoon Bharath’s daughter Sruthi and after meeting with Adithya, she loves him very much. But Adithya doesn’t accept that proposal and he fells in love with Akanksha. Adithya denies his father’s rich proposal and will marry Akanksha. They both live in Adithya’s farmhouse. On the eve when Adithya went out on anemergency, a psycho killer enters into the farmhouse to kill Akanksha. Now a deaf and dumb Akanksha must fight for life in her silence world. On the otherside police officer Patil arrests Adithya and tortures him. Who is the psycho enters into the farmhouse to kill Akanksha, why he came to kill Akanksha, why the police arrests Adithya and how he came out from the police custody, how Akanksha escapes from the killer in the lion-deer war like, these all will be revealed in the climax of the movie.

== Cast ==
- Samyuktha Hegde as Akanksha
- Prabhu Mundkur
- Vijay Bolenath
- Susmita Gowda
- Cudavalli Chandrashekar as Aravind
- Ramakrishna as Bharath
- Aravind as Patil
