= Neravanda Aiyappa =

Indian cricketer (born 1979)

N. C. Aiyappa
Personal information
- Full name: Narvanda Chetticha Aiyappa
- Born: 19 October 1979 (age 47); Bangalore, Karnataka
- Batting: Right-handed
- Bowling: Right-arm Medium

Domestic team information
- Years: Team
- 2001–02: Karnataka
- Royal Challengers Bengaluru

Career statistics
| Competition | FC | T20 |
|---|---|---|
| Matches | 32 | 26 |
| Runs scored | 214 | 50 |
| Batting average | 7.64 | 0.00 |
| 100s/50s | 0/0 | 0/0 |
| Top score | 34 | 0 |
| Balls bowled | 5533 | 80 |
| Wickets | 116 | 4 |
| Bowling average | 25.75 | 26.00 |
| 5 wickets in innings | 3 | 0 |
| 10 wickets in match | 0 | 0 |
| Best bowling | 5/63 | 2/14 |
| Catches/stumpings | 21 | 1 |

Narvanda Chetticha Aiyappa, aka NC Aiyappa (born 19 October 1979) is a former Indian first-class cricketer who played in Ranji Trophy matches for Karnataka. He made his debut in first-class cricket on 2 December 2001 in a match against Tamil Nadu.

Aiyappa is the younger brother of actress Prema. He competed in Bigg Boss Kannada season 3 in 2015–16. He married actress Anusha Poovamma on 20 January 2019.
