= Pratham (Kannada actor) =

Indian actor

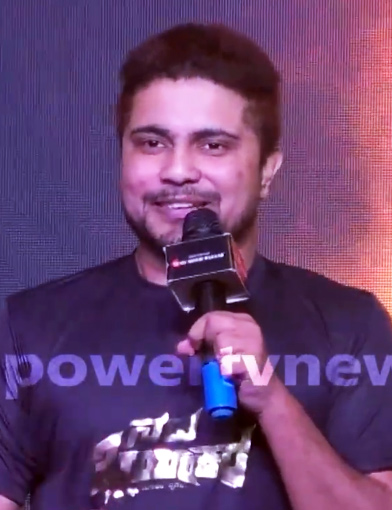
- Pratham in 2023
- Born: Punith; Halagapura, Kollegal, Karnataka, India
- Occupation: Actor
- Years active: 2014–present
- Known for: Winner of Bigg Boss Kannada (season 4)

Pratham is an actor and the winner of Kannada reality show Bigg Boss Kannada (season 4) (2016–17).

== Personal life ==
Pratham was born on February 24 to Malle Gowda, a government employee, and Lakshmi, a high-school teacher in Halagapura of Kollegal taluk, Karnataka, India. He studied in Mysuru and T. Narsipura and grew up with his maternal grandparents.

== Filmography ==
Key
†	Denotes films that have not yet been released

Year	Film	Role	Note(s)
2014	Kwatle Satisha	Prem	
2018	MLA	Pratham	
2018	Devrantha Manushya		
2018	Raju Kannada Medium		Cameo
2023	Nata Bhayankara	Pratham "Puttu"	
2024	Karnatakada Aliya		
2026	First Night With Devva		

Preceded by Shruti (2015)	Bigg Boss Kannada Winner (Series 4) 2016	Succeeded by Chandan Shetty (2017)
