= Akul Balaji =

Indian film actor (born 1979)

- Born: Akula Balaji; 23 February 1979 (age 47); Koduru, Andhra Pradesh, India
- Occupation: Actor
- Years active: 2002–present
- Spouse: Jyothi Akul (2008–present)
- Children: Krishaan Nag

Akul Balaji (born Akula Balaji on 23 February 1979) is an Indian actor, television host and dancer who works in Kannada and Telugu television shows and films. He started his career by acting and hosting television shows and has participated in the Kannada Film Industry for almost a decade. He shot to fame for co-hosting the hit Kannada reality show Pyate Hudgir Halli Lifu on Asianet Suvarna Channel, with Kannada Star Sudeep. He recently hosted a Kannada dance reality show named Takadhimita on Colors Kannada Channel.

In 2014, by public vote, Akul won the second season of game show Bigg Boss Kannada – the Indian version of Celebrity Big Brother and currently produced by Endemol India

== Early and personal life ==
Originally from a small town called Rly. Kodur in Andhra Pradesh, Akul Balaji was born on 23 February 1979. After moving to Bangalore at age 16, he trained in Bharathanatyam under Smt. Usha Datar and later joined "Natya STEM Dance Kampni", headed by Madhu Nataraj as a contemporary dancer and learned Kathak from Guru Smt. Dr. Maya Rao. He also dabbled in theater in Director Pawan Kumar's adaptation of Badal Sarkar's Evam Inderjit in 2004. He has also done an advance acting workshop under Mahesh Dattani. Akul Balaji married his wife Jyothi Akul in 2008. The couple have a son.

== Career ==
From beginnings as a small screen actor, he has become an actor and television host in Karnataka. He had won "The most popular anchor award" by Big FM Big TV for the year 2010 and he has to his credit superhit shows like Kuniyonu Baara and Comedy Killadigalu on Zee Kannada. He has hosted super hit reality shows for Asianet Suvarna like Pyate Hudgir Halli Lifu season 1 & 2, Halli Haida Pyateg Banda, Pyate Mandi Kadige Bandru 1, Pyate Mandi Kaadige Bandru 2, which was shot in Andaman Islands, Hosa Luv Story, and Nodi Swamy Naavirode Heege. He hosted Mane Munde Mahalakshmi, a game show for ETV Kannada and Indian. He hosted Sye Ante Sye for Zee Telugu. He also hosted the reality show called Thakadimitha Dancing Stars for ETV Kannada. He has acted in the television series Agatha (2002), Guptha Gamini, Yava Janumadha Maithri, Jagalagantiyaru, Pellinati Pramanalu (2012). He made a comeback in the Telugu television industry in 2021 with Oohalu Gusagusalade.

== Filmography ==
=== Television ===
Year	Work	Role	Network	Language
2007	Kuniyonu Baara	Host	Zee Kannada	Kannada
2008	Comedy Killadigalu	Host	Zee Kannada	Kannada
2009	Kuniyonu Baara Boys vs Girls	Mentor	Zee Kannada	Kannada
2010	Pyate Hudgir Halli Lifu Season 1	Host	Suvarna	Kannada
2010	Halli Haida Pyateg Banda	Host	Suvarna	Kannada
2010	Pyate Mandi Kaadige Bandru Season 1	Host	Suvarna	Kannada
2011	Pyate Hudgir Halli Lifu Season 2	Host	Suvarna	Kannada
2011	Hosa Luv Story	Host	Suvarna	Kannada
2011	Pyate Mandi Kaadige Bandru Season 2	Host	Suvarna	Kannada
2012	Nodi Swami Naavirodhe Heege	Host	Suvarna	Kannada
2012	Pellinati Pramanalu	Abhi	Zee Telugu	Telugu
2013	Mane Mundhe Mahalakshmi	Host	ETV Kannada	Kannada
2013	Sye Ante Sye	Host	Zee Telugu	Telugu
2013	Indian	Host	ETV Kannada	Telugu
2014	Thaka Dhimi Tha Dancing star	Host	ETV Kannada	Kannada
2014	Bigg Boss Kannada (season 2)	Winner	ETV Kannada	Kannada
2014	Pyate Hudgir Halli Lifu (season 3)	Mentor	ETV Kannada	Kannada
2015	Dancing Stars Season 2	Host	Colors Kannada	Kannada
2015	3.2.1.GO	Host	Zee Telugu	Telugu
2015	Dancing Star Junior	Host	Colors Kannada	Kannada
2015	Super Jodi	Host	Star Suvarna	Kannada
2015	13 Fear is Real	Host	Zee Telugu	Telugu
2016	Star Suvarna Dance Dance	Host	Star Suvarna	Kannada
2016	KICK	Host	Udaya TV	Kannada
2017	Super Jodi Season 2	Host	Star Suvarna	Kannada
2017	Deshamudurlu	Host	MAA TV	Telugu
2017	Super Talk Time	Host	Colors Super	Kannada
2018	Master Dancer	Host	Colors Super	Kannada
2018	Pyate Hudgir Halli Lyfu Season 4	Host	Star Suvarna	Kannada
2018	Sixth Sense Kannada	Host	Star Suvarna	Kannada
2018	Halli Haida Pyateg Banda Season 4	Host	Star Suvarna	Kannada
2019	Thakadimitha	Host	Colors Kannada	Kannada
2019	Colors Comedy Company	Host	Colors Kannada	Kannada
2021	Cookku With Kirikku	Host	Star Suvarna	Kannada
2021	Oohalu Gusagusalade	Abhiram	Zee Telugu	Telugu
2021	Bigg Boss Kannada Mini Season	Task Master	Colors Kannada	Kannada
2022	Dancing Champion	Host	Colors Kannada	Kannada
2022	Dance India Dance Telugu	Host	Zee Telugu	Telugu
2022	Ghana Bajaana Season 3	Host	Star Suvarna	Kannada
2023	Bharjari Bachelors	Host	Zee Kannada	Kannada
2024	Comedy Killadigalu Premier League	Judge / Team Owner	Zee Kannada	
2024	Zee Entertainers	Show Host	Zee Kannada	
2025	Halli Power	Show Host	Zee Power	Kannada
2026	Halli Power Reloaded	Show Host	Zee Kannada	Kannada

=== Film ===
Year	Title	Role(s)	Notes
2006	Kallarali Hoovagi	Thippaga	
2007	Milana		Cameo appearance
2008	Athmeeya	Vijay	
2008	Paramesha Panwala		
2009	Neramu Siksha	Rohit	Telugu film
2009	Banni		
2013	Myna	Game show host	Cameo appearance
2013	Pyarge Aagbittaite		Cameo appearance
2013	Loosegalu	Shankara	
2014	Crazy Star		Cameo appearance

Preceded by Vijay Raghavendra	Bigg Boss Kannada Winner (Series 2) 2014	Succeeded by Shruti
