= Shruthi =

Shruthi or variations may refer to:

- Śruti, an ancient religious texts comprising the central canon of Hinduism

== People ==
- Shruthi Leon, daughter of Cottalango Leon
- Shruthi Raj, Indian film and television actress
- Shruti (actress) (born 1976), Kannada language actress
- Shruti Sharma (born 1981), Indian model and actress
- Shruti Haasan (born 1986), Indian actress and singer
- Sruthi Lakshmi (born 1986), Indian actress
- Sruthi Hariharan (born 1989), Indian dancer and actress
- Shruti Kotwal (born 1991), Indian ice speed skater
- Shruti Sharma (actress) (born 1994), Indian actress
- Shruti Mishra, Indian badminton player

== Other uses ==
- Shruthi (film), a 1990 Kannada film, directed by Dwarakish
- Sruti (magazine), a magazine devoted to Indian music and dance
- Shruti (music), the smallest interval in Indian classical music
- Shruti box, an Indian drone instrument
- ShruthiUK, a UK based non-profit organisation

== See also ==
- Shrutika (born 1986), Indian actress
