= Colors Kannada =

Indian Kannada-language television channel

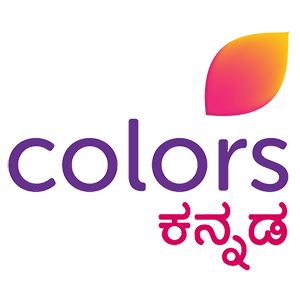
- Country: India
- Headquarters: Bengaluru, Karnataka, India

Programming
- Language: Kannada
- Picture format: 576i (SDTV); 1080i (HDTV)

Ownership
- Owner: JioStar, a Joint Venture between Viacom18 & Disney India

History
- Launched: December 10, 2000; 25 years ago
- Replaced: ETV Kannada

Links
- Website: Official website

Availability

Streaming media
- JioHotstar: India

Colors Kannada (previously known as ETV Kannada) is an Indian Kannada language general entertainment channel, owned by JioStar, a joint venture between Viacom18 and Disney India. It primarily telecasts serials, reality shows and Kannada films.

== History ==
The channel was originally launched on 10 December 2000 as ETV Kannada and was promoted by businessman Ramoji Rao. It later became a part of Viacom 18, owned by Network 18, officially re-branding under the Colors franchise on 26 April 2015. Colors Kannada was the first general entertainment channel to start an HD channel in Karnataka.

== Current broadcast ==
=== Fiction series ===
Premiere date	Series	Time	Ref.
09 March 2026	Raani	6:00 PM	
26 January 2026	Pavithra Bandhana	6:30 PM	
08 June 2026	Agnisakshi	7:00 PM	
14 April 2025	Muddu Sose	7:30 PM	
27 January 2026	Gowri Kalyana	8:00 PM	
06 October 2025	Shree Gandhada Gudi	8:30 PM	
04 June 2025	Nandagokula	9:00 PM	
7 December 2026	Saraswhi Chandra	TBA	

=== Non-fiction shows ===
Premiere date	Show	Time	Ref.
06 September 2026	Bigg Boss Kannada Season 13		

== Former broadcast ==
=== Fiction series ===
1. Vadhu (2025)
2. Yajamana (2025–2026)
3. Bhargavi LLB (2025–2026)
4. Nandagokula (2025)
5. Drishtibottu (2024–2025)
6. Nooru Janmaku (2024–2025)
7. Ninagaagi (2024–2025)
8. Karimani (2024–2025)
9. Brindavana (2023–2024)
10. Antarapata (2023)
11. Punyavathi (2023)
12. Tripura Sundari (2023)
13. Ganda Hendathi (2023)
14. Olavina Nildana (2022–2023)
15. Lakshana (2021–2023)
16. Ramachaari (2022–2025)
17. Dasa Purandara (2022)
18. Pavada Purusha (2022)
19. Doresani (2021)
20. Kanyakumari (2021)
21. Geetha (2020)
22. Kannadathi (2020)
23. Nannarasi Radhe (2020)
24. Ginirama (2020)
25. Hoo Male (2020)
26. Lagna Patrike (2020)
27. Moorugantu (2020)
28. Ivalu Sujatha (2019)
29. Ishtadevathe (2019)
30. Mithuna Raashi (2019)
31. Nammane Yuvarani (2019)
32. Ranganayaki (2019)
33. Raksha Bandhana (2019)
34. Mahakaali (2018)
35. Neelambari (2018)
36. Seetha Vallabha (2018)
37. Padmavathi (2017)
38. Radha Ramana (2017)
39. Shani (2017)
40. Gokuladhalli Seethe (2016)
41. Manedevru (2016)
42. Om Shakti Om Shanti (2016)
43. Yashode (2014–2016)
44. Kinnari (2015)
45. Gandhari (2015)
46. Soubhagyavathi (2015)
47. Devathe (2015)
48. Kulavadhu (2014)
49. Lakshmi Baramma (2013)
50. Charanadasi (2013)
51. Akka (2013)
52. Chitte Hejje (2013)
53. Mahaparva (2013)
54. Robo Family (2013)
55. Nanna Jeeva Neenu (2013)
56. Chitralekha (2013)
57. Amma Ninagaagi (2013)
58. Putta Gowri Maduve (2012)
59. Sri Raghavendra Mahime (2012)
60. Pavitra Bandhan (2012)
61. Ninnolumeyindale (2012)
62. Mangala Gowri Maduve (2012–2022)
63. Preethi Illada Mele (2011)
64. Arundhati (2010)
65. Mahanavami (2009)
66. Minchu (2007)
67. Mane Ondu Mooru Bagilu (2006)
68. Bande Baratava Kala (2006)
69. Gruhabhanga (2004–2005)
70. Malebillu (2004)
71. Muttina Torana (2004)
72. Moodala Mane (2003)
73. Baduku (2003)
74. Gupta Gamini (2003)
75. Shantham Papam Season 2
76. Shantham Papam Season 3 (2020)
77. Shantam Paapam Season 5
78. Shantam Paapam Season 6
79. Muktha Muktha
80. Silli Lalli
81. Shubhamangala
82. Agnisakshi
83. Manthana
84. Gaalipata
85. Ashwini Nakshatra
86. Mukta
87. Manvantara
88. Lakshmi- Kannada
89. Pranavam
90. Mohini VS Mahalinga
91. Chakratheertha
92. Charandasi
93. Maharshi Darshana
94. Anavarana
95. Atma Kathegalu
96. Garva
97. Pa Pa Pandu
98. Srinivasa Kalyana
99. Radha
100. Yadva Tadva
101. Sukanya
102. Maadu Sikkadalla
103. Devaki Nandana
104. Anu
105. Chikkejamani B.A B.L
106. Chukki Taare
107. Namaskara
108. Bidige Chandrama
109. Helavanakatte Giriyamma
110. Comedy Circle
111. Olave Namma Baduku
112. Adhika Prasanga
113. Venkata Ramana Govinda
114. Bhakthi Sinchana
115. Chakravarthy Ashoka
116. Shri Gowri
117. Pandu I love you
118. Manju Musukida Haadi
119. Vaidehi Parinaya
120. Divya Sannidhi
121. Prema Kathegalu
122. Shrimad Bhagavad Gita
123. Matte Baruvanu Chandira
124. Thareyara Mane Mana
125. Yava Janmada Maitri
126. Nivedana Ramayana
127. Chakori
128. Haaku Hejje Haaku
129. Musanje Katha Prasanga
130. Shakti
131. Mane Mane Mahalakshmi
132. Gajina Gombe
133. Jwalamukhi
134. Naga Bhairavi
135. Charulatha
136. Yaariguntu Yaarigilla Season-2
137. Naga Kannike Season 1
138. Naga Kannike Season 2
139. Naga Kannike Season 3
140. Naga Kannike Season 4
141. Naga Kannike Season 5
142. Naga Kannike Season 6
143. Naga Kannike Season 7
144. Nagakannike 7

=== Reality and non-fiction shows ===
1. Bigg Boss Kannada Season 12 (2025–2026)
2. Bigg Boss Kannada Season 11 (2024–2025)
3. Bigg Boss Kannada Season 10 (2023–2024)
4. Bigg Boss Kannada Season 9 (2022–2023)
5. Gicchi Gili Gili 2 (2022–2024)
6. Dancing Champion (2022)
7. Nannamma Super Star Season 2 (2022)
8. Bigg Boss Kannada Season 8 (2021)
9. Bigg Boss Mini Season (2021)
10. Nannamma Super Star Season 1 (2021)
11. Munjaane Raaga (2021)
12. Raja Rani Season-2 (2021–2024)
13. Raja Rani Show (2021–2024)
14. Majaa Bharatha Season 4 (2020–2021)
15. Haadu Karnataka (2020)
16. Chat Corner (2020)
17. Bigg Boss Kannada Season 7 (2019–2020)
18. Kannadada Kotyadhipati Season 4 (2019)
19. Comedy Company (2019)
20. Thaka Dhimi Tha Dancing Star Season 2 (2019)
21. Bigg Boss Kannada Season 6 (2018–2019)
22. Family Power (2017–2018)
23. Comedy Talkies (2017)
24. Sanju Mattu Naanu (2017)
25. Bigg Boss Kannada Season 5 (2017–2018)
26. Super Minute Season 3 (2017)
27. Bigg Boss Kannada 4 (2016–2017)
28. Prarthane (2016)
29. Dancing Star Season 3 (2016)
30. Super Minute Season 2 (2016)
31. Majaa Talkies Season 3 (2015–2021)
32. Bigg Boss Kannada 3 (2015–2016)
33. Super Minute Season 1 (2015)
34. Majaa Talkies Season 1 (2015)
35. Thaka Dhimi Tha Dancing Star Season 1 (2014)
36. Bigg Boss Kannada Season 1 (2013)
37. Mane Munde Mahalakshmi (2013)
38. Indian Reality Show (2013)
39. Yede Thumbi Haaduvenu (2012; 2021)
40. Crime Diary
41. Star Saviruchi
42. Takadimitha
43. Thakadimitha
44. Bhojana priya
45. Ondu Cinema Kathe
46. Gicchi Gili Gili 1
47. Majaa Bharatha Season 3
48. Demandappo Demandu
49. Dj
50. Endu Mareyada Haadu
51. Kannada Namana
52. Airtel Naane Rajkumar
53. Super Minute Season 4
54. Majaa Bharatha Season 2
55. Yaksha Ranga
56. Comediga
57. Majaa Weekend
58. Super Minute Season-5
59. Majaa Talkies Season 2
60. Jai Kannada
61. Super Minute Scholarship
62. Dancing Star Junior

== Sister channels ==
=== Colors Super ===
Colors Super is an Indian general entertainment channel, owned by JioStar, that primarily broadcasts Kannada-language entertainment shows. This channel was launched on 24 July 2016, after the success of Kannada's leading entertainment channel, Colors Kannada, the primary Kannada entertainment channel of JioStar.

=== Colors Kannada Cinema ===
Colors Kannada Cinema is an Indian pay television movie channel broadcasting in Kannada language, owned by JioStar. It was launched on 24 September 2018.
