= Bigg Boss Kannada season 9 =

Ninth season of the reality TV series Bigg Boss Kannada

Bigg Boss Kannada
- Season 9
- Presented by: Sudeep
- No. of days: 99
- No. of housemates: 18
- Winner: Roopesh Shetty
- Runner-up: Rakesh Adiga
- No. of episodes: 98

Release
- Original network: Colors Kannada; Voot Select
- Original release: 24 September – 31 December 2022

Series chronology
- ← Previous; Season 8 Next → Season 10

Bigg Boss 9 is the ninth season of the Indian Kannada-language reality television game show Bigg Boss premiered on 24 September 2022. It is produced by Endemol Shine India under the control of Banijay and broadcast on Colors Kannada along with a 24/7 Live Stream on Voot with Sudeep as the host for the ninth consecutive year.

== Telecast ==
Bigg Boss Kannada Season 9 is telecasted everyday on Colors Kannada and 24/7 Live Stream on Voot. It contains:

- Main Episode (The main episode that is telecasted on Colors Kannada)
- TV Ginta Modalu (Main Episode telecast before the airing on TV, only on Voot Select)
- 24/7 Live Channel (Live telecast from Bigg Boss house, on weekdays, only on Voot Select)
- Unseen Kathegalu (Unseen Clips, only on Voot Select)
- Extra Masala (Extra Clips)
- Bigg Inn (Entry Interview)
- Bigg Bang (Exit Interview)
- Voot Weekly (Best Compilations)
- Voot Fryday (Special Friday Tasks)
- Voot Video Vichara (Audience can share their views about the contestants through a video)

== Production ==
=== Teaser ===
The show organizers officially released a teaser using the show's logo on 7 September 2022. On 15 September 2022, a new teaser released with host Sudeep and confirmed that the show would premiere on 24 September 2022 on Colors Kannada and Voot.

=== Contestants ===
The show is sticking to the original format of the reality programme and it will only have celebrities who will be entering the house as contestants. Bigg Boss Kannada 9 will have a line up of five former Bigg Boss Kannada contestants and Top four contestants of Bigg Boss OTT Season 1 along with new contestants who will make their Bigg Boss debut. Inclusions were made from Season 1, 5, 7, 8 and OTT season only.

=== Format ===
The show follows selected contestants who are isolated from the outside world for 98 days (or 14 weeks) in a custom-built house. The housemates are dictated by an omnipresent entity named Bigg Boss. Each week, one or more of the housemates are evicted by a public vote. The last week, the housemate who gets the most votes, wins the game.

== Housemates status ==
Sr	Housemate	Day entered	Day exited	Housemates Status
1	Roopesh	Day 1	Day 98	Winner
2	Rakesh	Day 1	Day 98	1st runner-up
3	Deepika	Day 1	Day 56	Evicted
3	Deepika	Day 58	Day 98	2nd runner-up
4	Rupesh	Day 1	Day 98	3rd runner-up
5	Divya	Day 1	Day 97	4th runner-up
6	Aryavardhan	Day 1	Day 93	Evicted
7	Arun	Day 1	Day 91	Evicted
8	Amulya	Day 1	Day 91	Evicted
9	Anupama	Day 1	Day 84	Evicted
10	Prashanth	Day 1	Day 77	Evicted
11	Kavyashree	Day 1	Day 70	Evicted
12	Vinod	Day 1	Day 63	Evicted
13	Saanya	Day 1	Day 42	Evicted
14	Neha	Day 1	Day 35	Evicted
15	Mayuri	Day 1	Day 28	Evicted
16	Darsh	Day 1	Day 21	Evicted
17	Nawaz	Day 1	Day 14	Evicted
18	Aishwarya	Day 1	Day 7	Evicted

== Housemates ==
Sl no	Name	Occupation	Popular from
1	Deepika Das	Actress	Naagini; Dance Karnataka Dance; Bigg Boss Kannada 7
2	Neha Gowda	Serial Actress	Lakshmi Baramma; Raja Rani season 1
3	Kavyashree Gowda	Serial Actress	Mangala Gowri Maduve
4	Amulya Gowda	Serial Actress	Kamali
5	Anupama Gowda	Serial Actress	Akka; Raja Rani season 1; Bigg Boss Kannada 5
6	Vinod Gobbaragala	Reality Show contestant	Gicchi Giligili
7	Arun Sagar	Actor	Bigg Boss Kannada 1
8	Nawaz	Movie Reviewer	
9	Rupesh Rajanna	Kannada Activist	
10	Darsh Chandrappa	Actor	
11	Divya Uruduga	Actress	Bigg Boss Kannada 8
12	Prashanth Sambargi	Media Personality	
13	Aishwarya Pissay	Motorcycle Racer	
14	Mayuri Kyatari	Actress	Ashwini Nakshatra; Krishna Leela (2015 film); Nataraja Service (2016 film)
15	Rakesh Adiga	Actor	Jhossh; Bigg Boss OTT Kannada Season 1
16	Roopesh Shetty	Actor	Bigg Boss OTT Kannada Season 1
17	Aryavardhan	Numerlogist	Bigg Boss OTT Kannada Season 1
18	Saanya Iyer	Serial Actress	Putta Gowri Maduve; Dancing Champion; Bigg Boss OTT Kannada Season 1

== Nomination table ==
	Week 1	Week 2	Week 3	Week 4	Week 5	Week 6	Week 7	Week 8	Week 9	Week 10	Week 11	Week 12	Week 13	Week 14			
Nominees for Captaincy	No; Captain	Aishwarya; Divya; Prashanth; Vinod	Amulya; Aryavardhan; Darsh; Divya	Anupama; Deepika; Roopesh	Anupama; Arun; Mayuri; Prashanth; Rakesh; Sanya; Vinod	Amulya; Anupama; Vinod	Prashanth; Rupesh R Roopesh S	Amulya; Anupama; Kavyashree	No; Captain	Anupama; Deepika; Divya; Rakesh	Amulya; Anupama; Arun; Aryavardhan; Deepika; Divya; Kavyashree; Prashanth; Rakesh; Roopesh S Rupesh	Anupama; Amulya; Prashanth; Roopesh	No; Captain				
House Captain	No; Captain	Vinod	Aryavardhan	Deepika	Sanya	Anupama	Prashanth	Kavyashree	No; Captain	Rakesh	Rupesh	Roopesh	No; Captain				
Captain's Nomination	No; Captain	Rupesh R (to evict)	Anupama (to evict)	Sanya (to evict)	Aryavardhan (to evict)	Roopesh S (to evict)	Amulya (to evict)	Anupama (to evict)	No; Captain	Prashanth (to evict)	Rakesh (to evict)	Arun (to evict)	No; Captain				
Vote to:	Evict																
Roopesh	Aryavardhan; Darsh	Darsh; Neha	Prashanth; Rupesh R	Mayuri; Prashanth	Neha; Prashanth	Aryavardhan; Kavyashree	Anupama; Arun	Anupama; Deepika	Direct; Nomination	Roopesh S	Arun; Anupama	House; Captain	Direct; Nomination	Nominated	Finalist	Winner (Day 98)	
Rakesh	Aishwarya; Divya	Darsh; Mayuri	Darsh; Rupesh R	Aryavardhan; Prashanth	Deepika; Rupesh R	Rupesh R Sanya	Arun; Rupesh R	Deepika; Vinod	Direct; Nomination	House; Captain	Aryavardhan; Divya	Arun; Rupesh R	Direct; Nomination	Nominated	Finalist	1st Runner-up (Day 98)	
Deepika	Kavyashree; Roopesh S	Darsh; Rupesh R	Prashanth; Rupesh R	House; Captain	Roopesh S Rupesh R	Roopesh S Sanya	Aryavardhan; Rupesh R	Divya; Roopesh S	Evicted (Day 56)	Deepika	Amulya; Divya	Amulya; Rupesh R	Direct; Nomination	Nominated	Finalist	2nd Runner-up (Day 98)	
Rupesh	Prashanth; Vinod	Darsh; Kavyashree	Mayuri; Vinod	Mayuri; Kavyashree	Kavyashree; Vinod	Deepika; Divya	Anupama; Divya	Deepika; Divya	Direct; Nomination	Roopesh S	House; Captain	Anupama; Divya	Direct; Nomination	Nominated	Finalist	3rd Runner-up (Day 98)	
Divya	Mayuri; Sanya	Darsh; Nawaz	Prashanth; Rupesh R	Aryavardhan; Kavyashree	Aryavardhan; Deepika	Aryavardhan; Sanya	Deepika; Rupesh R	Arun; Deepika	Direct; Nomination	Divya	Aryavardhan; Prashanth	Deepika; Rupesh R	Direct; Nomination	Nominated	Finalist	4th Runner-up (Day 97)	
Aryavardhan	Aishwarya; Divya	Darsh; Mayuri	House; Captain	Arun; Sanya	Neha; Kavyashree	Divya; Sanya	Arun; Vinod	Amulya; Vinod	Direct; Nomination	Anupama	Anupama; Arun	Anupama; Divya	Direct; Nomination	Nominated	Evicted (Day 93)		
Arun	Aryavardhan; Darsh	Darsh; Deepika	Mayuri; Sanya	Aryavardhan; Neha	Neha; Rakesh	Rupesh R Sanya	Aryavardhan; Divya	Amulya; Rakesh	Direct; Nomination	Kavyashree	Aryavardhan; Divya	Divya; Rupesh R	Direct; Nomination	Evicted (Day 91)			
Amulya	Aryavardhan; Darsh	Deepika; Mayuri	Deepika; Roopesh S	Aryavardhan; Kavyashree	Arun; Deepika	Aryavardhan; Rupesh R	Deepika; Rupesh R	Arun; Roopesh S	Direct; Nomination	Amulya	Aryavardhan; Prashanth	Aryavardhan; Deepika	Direct; Nomination	Evicted (Day 91)			
Anupama	Mayuri; Sanya	Darsh; Nawaz	Divya; Vinod	Aryavardhan; Kavyashree	Amulya; Roopesh S	House; Captain	Arun; Deepika	Arun; Roopesh S	Direct; Nomination	Aryavardhan	Aryavardhan; Prashanth	Aryavardhan; Rupesh R	Evicted (Day 84)				
Prashanth	Aryavardhan; Darsh	Darsh; Nawaz	Darsh; Rupesh R	Divya; Rakesh	Neha; Roopesh S	Rupesh R Sanya	House; Captain	Amulya; Rakesh	Direct; Nomination	Deepika	Amulya; Anupama	Evicted (Day 77)					
Kavyashree	Arun; Nawaz	Deepika; Mayuri	Divya; Rupesh R	Amulya; Aryavardhan	Amulya; Rupesh R	Divya; Sanya	Anupama; Divya	House; Captain	Direct; Nomination	Arun	Evicted (Day 70)						
Vinod	Aishwarya; Divya	House; Captain	Divya; Mayuri	Aryavardhan; Divya	Roopesh S Rakesh	Not eligible	Amulya; Aryavardhan	Amulya; Divya	Direct; Nomination	Evicted (Day 63)							
Sanya	Amulya; Deepika	Amulya; Prashanth	Darsh; Neha	Aryavardhan; Neha	House; Captain	Arun; Aryavardhan	Evicted (Day 42)										
Neha	Arun; Nawaz	Darsh; Sanya	Darsh; Rupesh R	Mayuri; Kavyashree	Deepika; Prashanth	Evicted (Day 35)											
Mayuri	Prashanth; Vinod	Amulya; Darsh	Deepika; Rupesh R	Aryavardhan; Roopesh R	Evicted (Day 28)												
Darsh	Prashanth; Vinod	Neha; Prashanth	Prashanth; Roopesh S	Evicted (Day 21)													
Nawaz	Aishwarya; Divya	Amulya; Darsh	Evicted (Day 14)														
Aishwarya	Kavyashree; Roopesh S	Evicted (Day 7)															
Against Public Voting	Aishwarya; Arun; Aryavardhan; Darsh; Divya; Kavyashree; Mayuri; Nawaz; Prashanth; Roopesh S Sanya; Vinod	Amulya; Aryavardhan; Darsh; Deepika; Mayuri; Nawaz; Neha; Prashanth; Rupesh R	Amulya; Anupama; Darsh; Deepika; Divya; Mayuri; Prashanth; Roopesh S Rupesh R Vinod	Aryavardhan; Divya; Kavyashree; Mayuri; Neha; Prashanth; Roopesh S Sanya	Amulya; Aryavardhan; Deepika; Kavyashree; Neha; Prashanth; Rakesh; Roopesh S Rupesh	Aryavardhan; Divya; Prashanth; Roopesh S Rupesh R Sanya	None	Amulya; Anupama; Arun; Deepika; Divya; Roopesh S	Amulya; Anupama; Arun; Aryavardhan; Deepika; Divya; Kavyashree; Prashanth; Rakesh; Roopesh S Rupesh R Vinod	Amulya; Anupama; Arun; Aryavardhan; Deepika; Divya; Kavyashree; Prashanth; Roopesh S	Amulya; Anupama; Arun; Aryavardhan; Deepika; Divya; Prashanth; Rakesh	Anupama; Arun; Aryavardhan; Deepika; Divya; Rupesh R	Amulya; Aryavardhan; Arun; Deepika; Divya; Rakesh; Roopesh S Rupesh R	Aryavardhan; Deepika; Divya; Rakesh; Roopesh S Rupesh R	Deepika; Divya; Rakesh; Roopesh S Rupesh R		
Re-entered	None								Deepika	None							
Evicted	Aishwarya	Nawaz	Darsh	Mayuri	Neha	Sanya	No Elimination	Deepika	Vinod	Kavyashree	Prashanth	Anupama	Amulya	Aryavardhan	Arun	Divya	Rupesh R
Evicted	Aishwarya	Nawaz	Darsh	Mayuri	Neha	Sanya	No Elimination	Deepika	Vinod	Kavyashree	Prashanth	Anupama	Amulya	Aryavardhan	Arun	Deepika	
Evicted	Aishwarya	Nawaz	Darsh	Mayuri	Neha	Sanya	No Elimination	Deepika	Vinod	Kavyashree	Prashanth	Anupama	Amulya	Aryavardhan	Arun	Rakesh	Roopesh S

indicates OTT Season 1 contestant.
Indicates Season 1 contestant.
Indicates Season 5 contestant.
Indicates Season 7 contestant.
Indicates Season 8 contestant.
Indicates New Contestant.
indicates the House Captain.
indicates the Nominees for house captaincy.
indicates that the Housemate was directly nominated for eviction prior to the regular nominations process.
indicates that the housemate went to secret room.
indicates that the Housemate was granted immunity from nominations.
indicates the winner.
indicates the first runner up.
indicates the second runner up.
indicates the third runner up.
indicates the fourth runner up.
indicates the contestant has been walked out of the show.
indicates the contestant has been evicted.
indicates the contestant was not eligible.
