= 2nd IIFA Utsavam =

2017 Indian Telugu film award ceremony

- Date: 28–29 March 2017
- Site: Hyderabad International Convention Centre, Hyderabad, Telangana, India
- Hosted by: Akul Balaji; Meghana Gaonkar; Nani; Pearle Maaney; Rana Daggubati; Shiva; Tini Tom
- Produced by: Wizcraft International Entertainment
- Directed by: Andre Timmins

Highlights
- Best Picture: Janatha Garage (Telugu); Irudhi Suttru (Tamil); Pulimurugan (Malayalam); Kirik Party (Kannada)
- Most awards: Janatha Garage (6)
- Most nominations: Janatha Garage (9)

Television coverage
- Channel: Gemini TV (Telugu); Sun TV (Tamil); Surya TV (Malayalam); Udaya TV (Kannada)
- Network: Sun TV Network

The 2nd IIFA Utsavam ceremony honouring the winners and nominees of the best of South Indian cinema in 2016 was held on 28 and 29 March 2017 at the Hyderabad, Telangana, India. The event, which is the second edition of the IIFA Utsavam, recognises the best work from the four industries during the year 2016 and awarded prizes to performers and technicians from the Telugu, Tamil, Malayalam and Kannada languages.

== Ceremony information ==
The event is being chiefly hosted by Rana Daggubati, who along with Nani, Akul Balaji and Meghana Gaonkar host for Telugu and Kannada segments. Rana Daggubati along with Tini Tom, Pearle Maaney and Shiva host for Tamil and Malayalam segments.

== Winners and nominees ==
=== Main awards ===
==== Telugu ====
The nominations for the films released during 2016 were announced early March 2017. Janatha Garage and Oopiri topped with 9 nominations each out of total 13 categories followed by Pelli Choopulu with 8 nominations and Rudhramadevi with 7 nominations.

Best Picture	Best Direction
Janatha Garage; Kshanam; Nannaku Prematho; Oopiri; Pelli Choopulu	Koratala Siva – Janatha Garage; Krish Jagarlamudi – Kanche; Sukumar – Nannaku Prematho; Tharun Bhascker – Pelli Choopulu; Vamshi Paidipally – Oopiri
Performance in a Leading Role – Male	Performance in a Leading Role – Female
N. T. Rama Rao Jr. – Janatha Garage; Allu Arjun – Sarrainodu; Nani – Krishna Gaadi Veera Prema Gaadha; Ram Charan – Dhruva; Vijay Deverakonda – Pelli Choopulu	Samantha – A Aa; Anushka Shetty – Rudhramadevi; Anushka Shetty – Size Zero; Pragya Jaiswal – Kanche; Ritu Varma – Pelli Choopulu
Performance in a Supporting Role – Male	Performance in a Supporting Role – Female
Allu Arjun (Note: Gunasekhar has taken the award instead of Allu Arjun, due to the latter's absence) – Rudhramadevi; Karthi – Oopiri; Mohanlal – Janatha Garage; Nandu – Pelli Choopulu; Srikanth – Sarrainodu	Anupama Parameswaran – Premam; Anasuya Bharadwaj – Kshanam; Jayasudha – Oopiri; Nadhiya – A Aa; Nithya Menon – Rudhramadevi
Performance in a Comic Role	Performance in a Negative Role
Priyadarshi Pulikonda – Pelli Choopulu; Prakash Raj – Oopiri; Prudhvi Raj – Bengal Tiger; Vennela Kishore – Ekkadiki Pothavu Chinnavada; Srinivas Avasarala – Kanche	Jagapathi Babu (Note: B. V. S. N. Prasad has taken the award instead of Babu, due to the latter's absence) – Nannaku Prematho; Aadhi Pinisetty – Sarrainodu; Arvind Swamy – Dhruva; Rao Ramesh – A Aa; Vikramjeet Virk – Rudhramadevi
Music Direction	Lyrics
Devi Sri Prasad – Janatha Garage; Devi Sri Prasad – Sardaar Gabbar Singh; Gopi Sunder – Oopiri; Hiphop Tamizha – Dhruva; Vivek Sagar – Pelli Choopulu	Ramajogayya Sastry – "Jai Ho Janatha" from Janatha Garage; Ramajogayya Sastry – 'Vasthane" from Soggade Chinni Nayana; Sri Mani – "Evare" from Premam; Sirivennela Seetharama Sastry – "Podhaama" from Oopiri; Sirivennela Seethrama Sastry – "Matthagajame" from Rudhramadevi
Playback Singer – Male	Playback Singer – Female
Haricharan – "Nuvvante Naa Navvu" from Krishna Gaadi Veera Prema Gaadha; Haricharan – "Podhaama" from Oopiri; Haricharan – "Bang Bang" from Premam; Haricharan – "Avuna Neevena" from Rudhramadevi; Shankar Mahadevan – "Pranaamam" from Janatha Garage	Geetha Madhuri – "Pakka Local" from Janatha Garage; Shreya Ghoshal – "Punnami Puvvai" from Rudhramadevi; Shreya Ghoshal – "Itu Itu Ani" from Kanche; Shreya Ghoshal – "Nee Navve" from Soggade Chinni Nayana; Suchitra – "Ayyo Ayyo" from Oopiri
Best Story
Krish Jagarlamudi – Kanche; Koratala Siva – Janatha Garage; Sukumar – Nannaku Prematho; Adivi Sesh – Kshanam; Tharun Bhascker – Pelli Choopulu

==== Tamil ====
The nominations for the films released during 2016 were announced early March 2017. Chennai 600028 II lead the nominations list with 11 categories out of total 13 categories. Whereas Kabali finds spot in 8 categories, followed by critically acclaimed Visaranai and Irudhi Suttru in 5 categories, while Theri received 4 nominations.

Best Picture	Best Direction
Irudhi Suttru; Amma Kanakku; Chennai 600028 II; Kabali; Visaranai	Atlee – Theri; Karthick Naren – Dhuruvangal Pathinaaru; Pa. Ranjith – Kabali; Venkat Prabhu – Chennai 600028 II; Vetrimaaran – Visaranai
Performance in a Leading Role – Male	Performance in a Leading Role – Female
R. Madhavan – Irudhi Suttru; Attakathi Dinesh – Visaranai; Guru Somasundaram – Joker; Rajinikanth – Kabali; Sivakarthikeyan – Rajinimurugan	Ritika Singh – Irudhi Suttru; Anjali – Iraivi; Amala Paul – Amma Kanakku; Gayathri – Joker; Nayanthara – Naanum Rowdy Dhaan
Performance in a Supporting Role – Male	Performance in a Supporting Role – Female
Nagarjuna – Thozha; Rajkiran – Rajinimurugan; RJ Balaji – Naanum Rowdy Dhaan; Samuthirakani – Visaranai; Shiva – Chennai 600028 II	Baby Nainika – Theri; Mumtaz Sorcar – Irudhi Suttru; Radhika Sarathkumar – Naanum Rowdy Dhaan; Sai Dhanshika – Kabali; Vijayalakshmi Feroz – Chennai 600028 II
Performance in a Comic Role	Performance in a Negative Role
RJ Balaji – Naanum Rowdy Dhaan; John Vijay – Kabali; Premgi Amaren – Chennai 600028 II; RJ Balaji – Devi; Soori – Rajinimurugan	Mahendran – Theri; Karthi – Kaashmora; R. K. Suresh – Tharai Thappattai; Harish Uthaman – Thodari; Vaibhav Reddy – Chennai 600028 II
Music Direction	Lyrics
A. R. Rahman – Achcham Yenbadhu Madamaiyada; Anirudh Ravichander – Naanum Rowdy Dhaan; Santhosh Narayanan – Kabali; Siddharth Vipin – Jackson Durai; Yuvan Shankar Raja – Chennai 600028 II	Arunraja Kamaraj – "Neruppu Da" from Kabali; Ekatharaj – "Nooru Samigal" from Pichaikkaran; Thamarai – "Thalli Pogathey" from Achcham Yenbadhu Madamaiyada; Thamarai – "Neeyum Naanum" from Naanum Rowdy Dhaan; Parthi Bhaskar – "Idhu Kadhaiya" from Chennai 600028 II
Playback Singer – Male	Playback Singer – Female
Anirudh Ravichander – "Thangamey" from Naanum Rowdy Dhaan; Ananthu, Pradeep Kumar – "Maya Nadhi" from Kabali; Anirudh Ravichander – "Senjitaley" from Remo; Sean Roldan – "Idhu Kadhaiya" from Chennai 600028 II; Sid Sriram – "Thalli Pogathey" from Achcham Yenbadhu Madamaiyada	Neeti Mohan – "Neeyum Nannum" from Naanum Rowdy Dhaan; Chinmayi Sripada – "Yethetho" from Jackson Durai; Dhee – "Ey Sandakaara" and "Usuru Narumbeley" from Irudhi Suttru; Kharesma Ravichandran – "Idhu Kadhaiya" from Chennai 600028 II; Mahalakshmi Iyer – "Un Mela Oru Kannu" from Rajinimurugan
Best Story
Karthick Naren – Dhuruvangal Pathinaaru; Atlee – Theri; Ashwiny Iyer Tiwari – Amma Kanakku; M. Chandrakumar – Visaranai; Venkat Prabhu – Chennai 600028 II

==== Malayalam ====
The nominations for the films released since October 2015 till the end of 2016 were announced on 14 March 2017. Maheshinte Prathikaaram topped the list of nominations in all 13 categories followed by Charlie with 11 nominations and Aadupuliyattam with 7 nominations.

Best Picture	Best Direction
Pulimurugan; Aadupuliyattam; Charlie; Kammatipaadam; Maheshinte Prathikaram	Martin Prakkat – Charlie; Abrid Shine – Action Hero Biju; Dileesh Pothan – Maheshinte Prathikaram; Priyadarshan – Oppam; Rajeev Ravi – Kammatipaadam
Performance in a Leading Role – Male	Performance in a Leading Role – Female
Dulquer Salmaan – Charlie; Fahadh Faasil – Maheshinte Prathikaaram; Mohanlal – Oppam; Mohanlal – Pulimurugan; Nivin Pauly – Action Hero Biju	Rajisha Vijayan – Anuraga Karikkin Vellam; Anusree – Oppam; Aparna Balamurali – Maheshinte Prathikaram; Parvathy Thiruvothu – Charlie; Manju Warrier – Vettah
Performance in a Supporting Role – Male	Performance in a Supporting Role – Female
Vinayakan – Kammatipaadam; Alencier Ley – Maheshinte Prathikaram; Dharmajan Bolgatty – Kattappanayile Rithwik Roshan; Om Puri – Aadupuliyattam; Renji Panicker – Jacobinte Swargarajyam	Aparna Gopinath – Charlie; Anusree – Maheshinte Prathikaram; Asha Sharath – Anuraga Karikkin Vellam; K. P. A. C. Lalitha – Kochavva Paulo Ayyappa Coelho; Lijomol Jose – Kattappanayile Rithwik Roshan
Performance in a Comic Role	Performance in a Negative Role
Soubin Shahir – Charlie; Dharmajan Bolgatty – Kattappanayile Rithwik Roshan; Pashanam Shaji – Aadupuliyattam; Sharaf U Dheen – Pretham; Soubin Shahir – Maheshinte Prathikaram	Sampath Raj – Aadupuliyattam; Anil Nedumangad – Kammatipaadam; Jagadeesh – Leela; Samuthirakani – Oppam; Sujith Shankar – Maheshinte Prathikaram
Music Direction	Lyrics
Gopi Sunder – Charlie; 4 Musics – Oppam; Bijibal – Maheshinte Prathikaram; John P Varkey – Kammatipaadam; Ratheesh Vega – Aadupuliyattam	Santosh Varma – "Sundari Penne" from Charlie; Anwar Ali – "Para Para" from Kammatipaadam; Hari Narayanan – "Thiruvavani Raavu" from Jacobinte Swargarajyam; Kaithapram Damodaran Namboothiri – "Vaalmula Kannille" from Aadupuliyattam; Rafeeq Ahamed – "Idukki" from Maheshinte Prathikaram
Playback Singer – Male	Playback Singer – Female
Vijay Yesudas – "Mounangal" from Maheshinte Prathikaaram; Bijibal – "Cherupunjiri" from Maheshinte Prathikaram; Dulquer Salmaan – "Sundari Penne" from Charlie; P Jayachandran – "Vaalmula Kannille" from Aadupuliyattam; Unni Menon – "Thiruvavani Raavu" from Jacobinte Swargarajyam	Sreya Jayadeep – "Minungum Minnaminuge" from Oppam; Mamta Mohandas – "Karuppana Kannazhagi" from Aadupuliyattam; Sangeetha Sreekanth – "Theliveyil" from Maheshinte Prathikaram; Shreya Ghoshal – "Puthumazhayayi" from Charlie; Vani Jairam – "Pookal Panineer" from Action Hero Biju
Best Story
Unni R. – Charlie; Dinesh Palath – Aadupuliyattam; Rajeev Ravi – Kammatipaadam; Salim Ahamed – Pathemari; Syam Pushkaran – Maheshinte Prathikaram

==== Kannada ====
The nominations for the films released during 2016 were announced early March 2017. Kirik Party lead the nominations list with 12 categories out of total 13 categories. Whereas Karvva and Godhi Banna Sadharana Mykattu bagged 9 nominations followed by U Turn with 6 nominations.

Best Picture	Best Direction
Kirik Party – G. S Guptha and Rakshit Shetty; Godhi Banna Sadharana Mykattu – Pushkar Mallikarjun; Karvva – Krishna Chaithanya; Killing Veerappan – B. V. Manjunath, B. S. Sudhindra and E. Shivaprakash; U Turn – Pawan Kumar	Pawan Kumar – U Turn; Hemanth Rao – Godhi Banna Sadharana Mykattu; Navaneeth – Karvva; Raam Reddy – Thithi; Rishab Shetty – Kirik Party
Performance in a Leading Role – Male	Performance in a Leading Role – Female
Rakshit Shetty – Kirik Party; Anant Nag – Godhi Banna Sadharana Mykattu; Channe Gowda – Thithi; RJ Rohith – Karvva; Yash – Masterpiece	Parul Yadav – Killing Veerappan; Anisha Ambrose – Karvva; Rachita Ram – Rathavara; Rashmika Mandanna – Kirik Party; Shraddha Srinath – U Turn
Performance in a Supporting Role – Male	Performance in a Supporting Role – Female
Rakshit Shetty – Godhi Banna Sadharana Mykattu; Anant Nag – Maduveya Mamatheya Kareyole; Devaraj – Karvva; Dileep Raj – U Turn; Chandan Achar – Kirik Party; Tilak Shekar – Karvva	Yagna Shetty – Killing Veerappan; Aishwarya Acchappa – Kirik Party; Chitra Shenoy – Rathavara; Poonam Singar – Karvva; Radhika Chetan – U Turn
Performance in a Comic Role	Performance in a Negative Role
Chikkanna – Kotigobba 2; Achyuth Kumar – Godhi Banna Sadharana Mykattu; Chikkanna – Masterpiece; Pramod Shetty – Kirik Party; Vijay Chendoor – Karvva	Vasishta N. Simha – Godhi Banna Sadharana Mykattu; Aravinnd Iyer – Kirik Party; P. Ravi Shankar – Mukunda Murari; P. Ravi Shankar – Rathavara; Prakash Raj – Mr. Airavata
Music Direction	Lyrics
B. Ajaneesh Loknath – Kirik Party; Anoop Seelin – Jessie; Arjun Janya – Mungaru Male 2; Avinash – Karvva; V. Harikrishna – Masterpiece	Rakshit Shetty – "Katheyonda Helide" from Kirik Party; Sudarshan D. C. – "Ale Mood Adhe" from Godhi Banna Sadharana Mykattu; Raghu Shastry – "Summane" from Run Anthony; V. Nagendra Prasad – "Mukunda Murari" from Mukunda Murari; Manju Mandavya – "Annange Love Aagidhe" from Masterpiece
Playback Singer – Male	Playback Singer – Female
Vijay Prakash – "Belageddu" from Kirik Party; Anoop Seelin – "Malgudiya Ooralli" from Jessie; Puneeth Rajkumar – "Maduve Munji" from Nanna Ninna Prema Kathe; Puneeth Rajkumar – "Jhanak Jhanak" from Run Anthony; Yash – "Annange Love Aagidhe" from Masterpiece	Inchara Rao – "Ayomaya" from Godhi Banna Sadharana Mykattu; Indu Nagaraj – "Ka Thalakattu" from Mr. Airavata; K. S. Chithra – "Maye Maye" from Jessie; Shreya Ghoshal – "Neenire Saniha" from Kirik Party; Supriya Lohith – "Marula" from Run Anthony
Best Story
Pawan Kumar – U Turn; A. P. Arjun – Mr. Airavata; Hemanth Rao – Godhi Banna Sadharana Mykattu; Navaneeth – Karvva; Rakshit Shetty – Kirik Party

=== Technical awards ===
Best Screenplay
- Adivi Sesh – Kshanam (Telugu)
Best Costume Design
- Aishwarya Rajeev – Kanche (Telugu)
Best Make Up
- Bhanu Bhashyam (Note: Gunasekhar has taken the award instead of Bhashyam, due to the latter's absence) – Rudhramadevi (Telugu)

=== Special awards ===
- Outstanding contribution to Indian cinema – K. Raghavendra Rao
- Outstanding contribution to Indian cinema – S. P. Muthuraman
- Lifetime Achievement Award — Dwarakish

== Performers ==
The following individuals performed musical numbers.

Name(s)	Role
Jiiva	Performer
Sai Dharam Tej	Performer
Akhil Akkineni	Performer
Kunchacko Boban	Performer
Hansika Motwani	Performer
V. Ravichandran	Performer
Premgi	Performer
Akshara Haasan	Performer
Raai Laxmi	Performer
Raashii Khanna	Performer
Pragya Jaiswal	Performer
Nikki Galrani	Performer
Amyra Dastur	Performer
Rachita Ram	Performer
Isha Talwar	Performer
