= Dayal Padmanabhan =

Indian Kannada film director

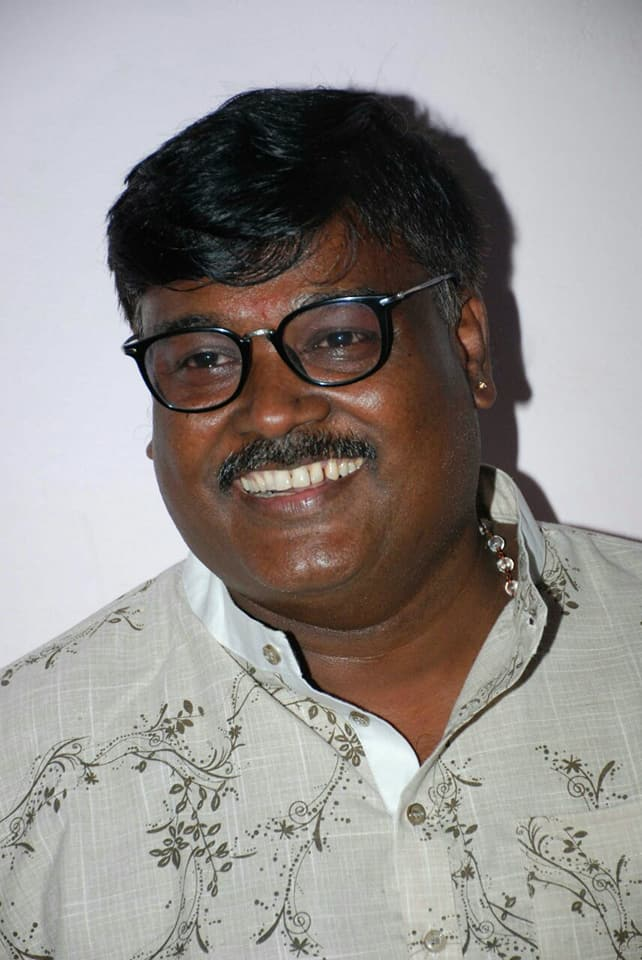
- Born: 14 June 1970 (age 56); Villupuram, Tamil Nadu, India
- Occupations: Film director, screenwriter, producer
- Years active: 2001–present
- Spouse: Meena Dayal

Dayal Padmanabhan is an Indian film writer, director and producer, mainly working in Kannada cinema apart from a few Tamil films.

His first film as a director was OK Saar OK in 2004. His film Haggada Kone and Aa Karaala Ratri received widespread critical acclaim in the year 2014 & 2018 respectively.

Dayal Padmanabhan competed in the television show Bigg Boss House for Bigg Boss Kannada season 5, and was eliminated on his 21st day.

== Early life ==
Dayal Padmanabhan was born on June 14, 1970 in Viluppuram town, to parents Padmanabhan and Radha Padmanabhan. He lost his father, who was working with the Tamil Nadu electricity board, at a very early age. Dayal had an interest in acting ever since he was young and Tamil actor Murali was his role model. He wanted to become an actor, but destiny made him a director and a writer. He completed his education with a Diploma in Civil Engineering from Muthiah Polytechnic, Chidambaram, and B.E. from the famous B.M.S. College of Engineering, Bangalore.

== Film career ==
He began his career with the film, OK Saar OK in 2004. Then, he has directed over ten Kannada films, including Baa Baaro Rasika (2004), Masala (2005), Circus (2009), Sri Harikathe (2010), and Haggada Kone (2014). His film Circus featured Ganesh in the lead role, while he himself appeared in Gaalipata (2008), portraying a mute character named "Dracula." His film Haggada Kone received rave reviews.

He ventured into production with the film Circus. Under his own banner he co-produced Sri Harikathe. He is the producer for the under production project Ondu Rupayalli Eradu Preethi. He also worked as an executive producer for the Tamil film Brahman (2014) starring M. Sasikumar.

He also ventured into the romantic comedy genre with Satya Harishchandra (2017), which marked his return to commercial filmmaking after a significant period. In this film, Sharan played the lead role. The following year Aa Karaala Ratri (2018) starring Karthik Jayaram and Anupama Gowda released, and it was both critically acclaimed and commercially successful.

In 2019, Thrayambakam was released, and Ranganayaki was announced for release, but its release was delayed due to the COVID-19 pandemic. The latter was selected to the Panorama Section of the 50th International Film Festival of India (IFFI), and is the only Kannada film that has been selected. In 2020, his Telugu debut film, Anaganaga O Athidhi, a remake of his 2018 film Aa Karaala Ratri, was released directly on Aha.

He remade the critically acclaimed Tamil film Kurangu Bommai in Kannada titled Ombattane Dikku starring Yogesh. In 2020, Dayal ventured into the Telugu and Tamil film industries with Anaganaga O Athidhi and Kondraal Paavam, which are the remakes of his own Kannada directorial Aa Karaala Ratri. He later directed crime Tamil films such as Maruthi Nagar Police Station (2023) and Lakshmikanthan Kolai Vazhakku (2026).

== Controversies ==
=== Film Awards ===
Dayal filed a petition against a prestigious film award for not nominating his film even after it had received widespread critical acclaim. His petition was accepted by Bangalore City civil court and the organizers/Jury were ordered to add nominations for his movie on four different categories, Best Actor (Male), Best Director, Best Film, Best Supporting Actor (male).

=== Petition Against Multiplexes ===
The Karnataka state budget 2016 - 2017 was scheduled to be proposed on 18 March. Ahead of this major event Dayal padmanabhan started a petition requesting the state government to cap the movie ticket prices to 120 Rs at multiplexes in the state.

He explained his intentions behind this petition."Multiplexes in Karnataka price the ticket based on the demand and profit margins. This reduces the occupancy rate. On an average, a cinema hall records only 46% occupancy even for a high profile film as the price is set at a higher range (It can go up to 800 INR). My idea is to reduce the pricing and increase the occupancy. More the patrons, more the patronage. Only this can make the industry healthier."

His Petition went viral and was signed by thousands of people across karnataka.

=== Complaint against Anup Sa Ra Govind ===
Dayal Padmanabhan, who is an active producer-director, had pointed out flaws in the 2019 elections at the Karnataka Film Chamber of Commerce. He contested on the appointment of Anuup Sara Govindu as a member and says it breaks the rules. He wrote a complaint letter to the District Registrar of Societies. Dayal argued that Mr. Anup Gowda failed to meet the eligibility to even contest in the elections as per the bylaws of KFCC.

=== Petition Against National Film awards ===
Dayal Padmanabhan filed a petition with the Karnataka high court against the National Film awards stating that one of the members of the jury was affiliated to film nominated for the awards and, as per regulations, a jury member or chairman should not be associated in any manner to the films submitted for awards.

== Filmography ==
=== As a film director ===
List of Dayal Padmanabhan film directing credits
Year	Film	Credited as				Language	Notes
Year	Film	Director	Screenplay	Story	Producer	Language	Notes
2004	OK Saar OK	✓	✓			Kannada	Credited as Dayal
2004	Baa Baaro Rasika	✓	✓	✓		Kannada	Credited as Dayal
2005	Yashwanth	✓	✓	✓		Kannada	Credited as Dayal
2005	Masala	✓	✓	✓		Kannada	Credited as Dayal
2005	Sakha Sakhi	✓	✓			Kannada	Remake of Tamil film Thiruda Thirudi; credited as Dayal
2009	Circus	✓	✓	✓		Kannada	
2010	Sri Harikathe	✓	✓	✓		Kannada	
2011	Yogaraj But	✓	✓	✓		Kannada	Won - Times of India film awards for Best Screenplay - Kannada
2014	Gharshane	✓	✓			Kannada	Remake of Tamil film Yuddham Sei
2014	Haggada Kone	✓	✓		✓	Kannada	
2016	Actor	✓	✓	✓	✓	Kannada	As co-producer
2017	Toss	✓	✓	✓		Kannada	
2017	Satya Harishchandra	✓	✓			Kannada	
2018	Aa Karaala Ratri	✓	✓			Kannada	Nominated - SIIMA Award for Best Director - Kannada
2018	Puta 109	✓	✓			Kannada	
2019	Thrayambakam	✓	✓	✓		Kannada	
2019	Ranganayaki Volume 1 : Virginity	✓	✓	✓		Kannada	
2020	Anaganaga O Athidhi	✓	✓			Telugu	Remake of Aa Karaala Ratri
2022	Ombattane Dikku	✓	✓		✓	Kannada	Remake of Tamil film Kurangu Bommai
2023	Kondraal Paavam	✓	✓		✓	Tamil	Remake of Aa Karaala Ratri; As co-producer
2023	Maruthi Nagar Police Station	✓	✓	✓	✓	Tamil	
2026	Lakshmikanthan Kolai Vazhakku	✓		✓	✓	Tamil	As co-producer

=== Other crew positions ===
List of Dayal Padmanabhan writing and producing credits
Year	Film	Credited as		Language	Notes
Year	Film	Writer	Producer	Language	Notes
2001	Gattimela	✓		Kannada	
2003	Hudugigagi	✓		Kannada	
2004	Om Ganesh	✓		Kannada	
2008	Gaalipata		✓	Kannada	As executive producer
2014	Bramman		✓	Tamil	As executive producer

=== As an actor ===
Year	Film	Role	Notes
2005	Masala	Himself	Uncredited role
2008	Gaalipata	Dracula	
2009	Circus	Beggar on the Gandhadagudi Express	Uncredited role
2014	Drishya	Contractor	
2015	Rudra Tandava		
2024	Maryade Prashne	Retired Police Commissioner	

== Awards ==
Year	Movie	Award	Category	Result	Ref.
2014	Haggada Kone	Karnataka State Film Awards	Karnataka State Film Award for Best Director; Karnataka State Film Award for Third Best Film	Won	
2018	Aa Karaala Ratri	2018 Karnataka State Film Awards	First Best Film	Won	
2018	Aa Karaala Ratri	2018 Karnataka State Film Awards	Best Director	Won	
2018	Aa Karaala Ratri	8th SIIMA Awards	Best Director	Nominated	
