= 2019 Karnataka State Film Awards =

Annual Indian film awards ceremony

54th Karnataka State Film Awards
- Awarded for: Best of Kannada Cinema in 2019
- Presented by: Siddaramaiah (Chief Minister of Karnataka)
- Announced on: 22 January 2025
- Site: Bengaluru, Karnataka, India

Highlights
- Best Picture: Mohandas
- Best Direction: P. Sheshadri; Mohandas
- Best Actor: Sudeepa (declined); Pailwaan
- Best Actress: Anupama Gowda; Thrayambakam
- Most awards: Mohandas (4)

The 2019 Karnataka State Film Awards, presented by Government of Karnataka, felicitated the best of Karnataka cinema released in the year 2019. The Awards are given away on 24 April every year which is the birthday of Dr. Rajkumar. But due to the Lok Sabha and Assembly elections in the last two years, the awards were not given on this date. The list of winners was announced on 22 January 2025.

Following the announcement of the awardees, actor Sudeepa, who won under Best Actor category, declined the award based on his personal commitment not to accept awards.

== Lifetime achievement award ==
Name of Award	Awardee(s)	Awarded As	Awards
Dr. Rajkumar Award	Umashree	Actress	₹5,00,000 and a gold medal with a certificate
Puttanna Kanagal Award	N. R. Nanjunde Gowda	Director	₹5,00,000 and a gold medal with a certificate
Dr. Vishnuvardhan Award	Richard Castellano	Producer, Director	₹5,00,000 and a gold medal with a certificate

== Film awards ==
Name of Award	Film	Producer	Director
First Best Film	Mohandas	M/S Mitra Chitra	P. Sheshadri
Second Best Film	Love Mocktail	Darling Krishna; Milana Nagaraj	Darling Krishna
Third Best Film	Arghyam	Y. Srinivas	Y. Srinivas
Best Film of Social Concern	Kanneri	Hebbar; Madhavi Hebbar; Chandrashekar	Ninasam Manju
Best Children Film	Elli Aadoodu Navu Elli Aadoodu	Srinivas	G. Arun Kumar
Best Regional Film	Triple Talaq (Beary language)	Gulvady Talkies	Yakub Khader Gulvady
Best Entertaining Film	India vs England	Y. N. Shankaregowda	Nagathihalli Chandrashekar
Best Debut Film of Newcomer Director	Gopala Gandhi	Sri Revana Siddeshwara Movies	Nagesh N

== Other awards ==
Name of Award	Film	Awardee	Cash Prize
Best Director	Mohandas	P. Sheshadri	₹ 1,00,000
Best Actor	Pailwaan	Sudeepa	₹ 20,000
Best Actress	Thrayambakam	Anupama Gowda	₹ 20,000
Best Supporting Actor	Chemistry of Kariappa	Tabla Nani	₹ 20,000
Best Supporting Actress	Brahmi	Anusha Krishna	₹ 20,000
Best Child Actor	Minchulu	Master Preetham	₹ 20,000
Best Child Actress	Sugandhi	Vaishnavi Adiga	₹ 20,000
Best Music Direction	Yajamana	V. Harikrishna	₹ 20,000
Best Male Playback Singer	Love Mocktail ("Kanna Haniyondu")	Raghu Dixit	₹ 20,000
Best Female Playback Singer	Raga Bhairavi	Jayadevi Jangamashetti	₹ 20,000
Best Cinematography	Mohandas	G. S. Bhaskar	₹ 20,000
Best Editing	Jhansi IPS	G. Basavaraj Urs	₹ 20,000
Best Lyrics	Pencil Box	Razak Puthur	₹ 20,000
Best Art Direction	Mohandas	Hosmane Murthy	₹ 20,000
Best Story Writer	Illu Iralare Allu Hogalaare	Jayanth Kaikini	₹ 20,000
Best Screenplay	Love Mocktail	Darling Krishna	₹ 20,000
Best Dialogue Writer	Amruthamathi	Baraguru Ramachandrappa	₹ 20,000
Jury's Special Award	Amruthamathi	Baraguru Ramachandrappa	₹ 20,000 each
Jury's Special Award	Thamate Narasimhaiah	Balaji Chithra	₹ 20,000 each
Best Book on Kannada Cinema			₹ 20,000
Best Short Film			₹ 20,000
