= Mohandas (2019 film) =

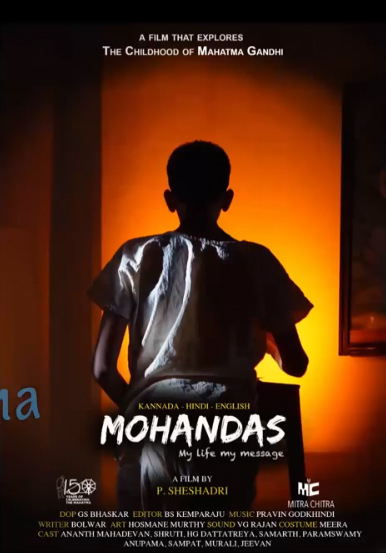
- Film poster
- Directed by: P. Sheshadri
- Screenplay by: P. Sheshadri
- Based on: Papu Gandhi, Bapu Gandhi Aada Kathe: The Story of Mahatma Gandhi by Bolwar Mahammad Kunhi & The Story of My Experiments with Truth by Mahatma Gandhi
- Produced by: M/S Mitra Chitra
- Starring: Param Swamy; Samarth Hombal; Shruti; Anant Mahadevan
- Cinematography: G. S. Bhaskar
- Edited by: B. S. Kemparaju
- Music by: Pravin Godkhindi
- Release date: 2 October 2019
- Country: India
- Languages: Kannada; Hindi; English
- Budget: ₹8 crore

Mohandas is an Indian biographical film about the childhood of Mahatma Gandhi. It is written and directed by nine-time National Film Award winner P. Sheshadri and was made in two languages simultaneously, Hindi and Kannada.

It is partially based on Sahitya Akademi Award winning Kannada writer Bolwar Mahammad Kunhi's book Papu Gandhi, Bapu Gandhi Aada Kathe: The Story of Mahatma Gandhi and The Story of My Experiments with Truth, the autobiography of Mahatma Gandhi. The film covers the events of Gandhi's childhood from the ages of 6 to 14. The cast includes Param Swamy playing Gandhi as a child and Samarth Hombal playing Gandhi as a teenager. Shruti plays Gandhi's mother Putlibai and Anant Mahadevan plays his father Karamchand Gandhi. Other cast members include Shriram H. R., Abhayankar Bellur, Surya, Mata Koppala, Deepa Ravishankar and Nandini Vittal. Veteran actor H. G. Dattatreya appears in a cameo.

At the 54th Karnataka State Film Awards, organized by Karnataka Government, the film won the maximum (4) awards including Best Film, Best Director, Best Cinematographer and Best Art Direction.

== Synopsis ==
"Mohandas" is a children's film that explores the childhood of Mahatma Gandhi. Spanning over six years until his adolescence, it depicts the important events that shaped him into the world renown personality that he eventually became.

Known affectionately as Monia, Mohandas Karamchand Gandhi was born into a privileged family to a father who was a Minister and a mother who nurtured conservative values.

His childhood was witness to an India under oppressive rule by the British Raj. But this was not the concern of a young Mohandas.

Instead, as a child he was deeply influenced by the stories of Shravana and Sathya Harishchandra, two Indian mythological figures. He learned about devotion to his parents from one and devotion to Truth from the other.

As Mohandas approaches adolescence, this devotion is constantly tested. Being impressionable, he falls prey to temptations and begins to lie to his parents about them. He develops a habit of smoking cigarettes, he steals money, and eats meat, which is against the values of his family.

He is deeply conflicted about his actions. He finally reaches a breaking point due to an incident involving his older brother, Karsandas.

Unable to accept his misdeeds and wracked with guilt, he writes a letter to his father confessing his wrongdoings. His father's reaction ends up teaching him a very important lesson that the young Mohandas carries with him for the rest of his life.

== Cast ==
- Samarth Hombal as Mohandas Gandhi (age 14)

- Param Swamy as a younger Mohandas (age 7)

- Anant Mahadevan as Karamchand Gandhi
- Shruti as Putlibai
- Shriram H. R. as Karsandas Gandhi
- Abhayankar Bellur as Madhavlal
- Surya as Sheikh Mehtab
- Deepa Ravishakar as Rambha
- Mata Koppala as Ramu Kaka
- Nandini Vittal as prostitute
- H. G. Dattatreya as bioscope showman

== Production ==
=== Screenplay ===
According to the film's director, P. Sheshadri, one of the major inspirations for taking up this project was because he thought that Gandhi has been "relegated to a few pages in a textbook" and a holiday once a year. He felt a film could be an "effective medium to reach young minds."

Sheshadri first came upon the book Papu Gandhi, Bapu Gandhi Aada Kathe: The Story of Mahatma Gandhi by Kannada writer Bolwar Mahammad Kunhi which inspired him to make the film. He felt this was a story that was relevant for children and parents all around the world. The screenplay is also partially based on this book. Another source was Gandhi's own autobiography.

=== Filming ===
A major portion of the film has been shot in Porbandar and Rajkot, including the ancestral home of the Gandhi family where Mahatma Gandhi was born and raised. Other scenes have been filmed in and around Bengaluru.

The film is being shot in two languages, Kannada and Hindi since Sheshadri intends for this story to reach a wider audience.

== Release ==
The film was released on 2 October 2019, the 150th birth anniversary of Mahatma Gandhi.
