= Buckasura =

- Directed by: Navaneeth
- Written by: Rajasimha
- Produced by: RJ Rohith
- Starring: R. J. Rohith; Kavya Gowda; V. Ravichandran
- Cinematography: Mohan
- Edited by: Venkatesh U D V
- Music by: Avinash Sreeram
- Production company: Padmavathi Pictures
- Release date: April 27, 2018
- Country: India
- Language: Kannada

Buckasura is a 2018 Indian Kannada psychological thriller film written by Rajasimha Tadinada and directed by Navaneeth and produced by R. J. Rohith, marking their second collaboration after Karvva (2016). It features RJ Rohith and Kavya Gowda along with V. Ravichandran in the lead antagonist role. The supporting cast includes Sithara, Suchendra Prasad, Shashikumar and Makarand Deshpande among others. The score and soundtrack for the film is by Avinash Sreeram and the cinematography is by Mohan. The film released on 27 April 2018. The movie was reported to be loosely inspired by the 1997 American movie The Devil's Advocate.

== Cast ==
- RJ Rohith as Arya (Money)
- Kavya Gowda
- V. Ravichandran as Chakaravrthy
- Shashikumar
- Sithara
- Saikumar
- Makarand Deshpande
- Pavithra Lokesh
- Suchendra Prasad
- Sadhu Kokila
- Sihi Kahi Chandru
- Vijay Chendoor

== Soundtrack ==
Buckasura

Soundtrack album by Avinash Sreeram
- Genre: Feature film soundtrack
- Language: Kannada
- Label: Anand Audio
- Producer: Avinash Sreeram

The film's background score and the soundtracks are composed by Avinash Sreeram. The music rights were acquired by Anand Audio.

Tracklist
| No. | Title | Singer(s) | Length |
|---|---|---|---|
| 1. | "Navella Ondu" | Nakul Abhyankar |
| 2. | "Buckaasura" | Nakul Abhyankar |
| 3. | "Hare Ram" | Abhinandan, Rithwika |
| 4. | "Aigiri Nandini fusion" | Rithwika, Nakul Abhyankar |
