= Anaganaga O Athidhi =

- Poster
- Directed by: Dayal Padmanabhan
- Screenplay by: Dayal Padmanabhan
- Story by: Mohan Habbu
- Produced by: Raja Ramamurthy; Chidambaram Natesan
- Starring: Payal Rajput; Chaitanya Krishna; Veena Sunder; Ananda Chakrapani
- Cinematography: Rakesh B.
- Edited by: Preethi Mohan; Babu A. Srivatsava
- Music by: Arrol Corelli
- Production company: Trend Loud
- Distributed by: Aha
- Release date: 20 November 2020
- Country: India
- Language: Telugu

Anaganaga O Athidhi (transl. Once upon a guest) is a 2020 Indian Telugu-language thriller film written and directed by Dayal Padmanabhan and produced by Raja Ramamurthy and Chidambaram Natesan, under the banner Trend Loud. The film stars Payal Rajput, Chaitanya Krishna, Veena Sunder, and Ananda Chakrapani. The film is a remake of the director's own Kannada film Aa Karaala Ratri (2018), which itself is based on a Kannada play by Mohan Habbu translated from the English play Lithuania by Rupert Brooke. The music was composed by Arrol Corelli. The film released on 20 November 2020 via Aha to negative reviews.

== Cast ==
- Payal Rajput as Mallika
- Chaitanya Krishna as Sreenivas
- Veena Sunder as Annapoorna
- Ananda Chakrapani as Subbaiah
- Venu Yeldandi as Kannappa
- Thotapalli Madhu as Vaddi Veerayya
- Ashok Kumar as Pravachakulu
- Naveen Krishna as Budabukkalodu
- Vasu Inturi as Head Constable
- Appaji Ambarisha Darbha as Kaasi
- Jabardasth Ramu as Supplier
- Malla Reddy as President
- Y. M. Vamsi Krishna as Constable
- Raj Royal as Ramana
- Bekkem Ravinder as Driver
- Kalyana Madhavi as President's wife
- Sri Lakshmi as Villager
- Ayesha as Pregnant Woman
- Master Chandrasekhar as Young Srinivas
- Baby Aradhya as Young Malli

== Production ==
The first look of the film was released by Vamshi Paidipally in October 2020. The film was earlier scheduled to premiere on 13 November 2023 on Aha but started streaming from 20 November 2023.

== Reception ==
The film received negative reviews from the critics.

Navein Darshan of The New Indian Express gave it 1.5 stars out of 5 and stated that "This is a film that bets on its final reveal and feels force-fitted into the feature film format". Thadhagath Pathi of The Times of India gave 2 stars out of 5 and wrote that "Anaganaga O Atihidhi is sadly a thriller with many loopholes in it, but with a better script they could’ve been overlooked. This remake is a case of wasted opportunity with many beats of the original lost in translation."
