= Kondraal Paavam =

- Theatrical release poster
- Directed by: Dayal Padmanabhan
- Written by: John Mahendran (dialogues)
- Screenplay by: Dayal Padmanabhan
- Story by: Mohan Habbu
- Produced by: Pratap Krishna; Manoj Kumar
- Starring: Varalaxmi Sarathkumar; Santhosh Prathap; Easwari Rao; Charle
- Cinematography: Chezhiyan
- Edited by: Preethi Mohan Babu
- Music by: Sam C. S.
- Production company: Einfach Studios
- Release date: 10 March 2023
- Country: India
- Language: Tamil

Kondraal Paavam (transl. Killing is a sin) is a 2023 Indian Tamil-language crime thriller film written and directed by Dayal Padmanabhan and produced by Pratap Krishna and Manoj Kumar under Einfach Studios. The film stars Varalaxmi Sarathkumar, Santhosh Prathap, Easwari Rao and Charle. It was released on 10 March 2023. The film is a remake of the director's own Kannada film Aa Karaala Ratri (2018), based on a Kannada play by Mohan Habbu which itself is translated from the English play Lithuania by Rupert Brooke.

== Plot ==
The story is set in the 80s. In a small village located deep in Tamil Nadu, a poor family consisting of aged parents Karuppusamy (Charle) and Valliyammal (Easwari Rao) and their spinster daughter Mallika (Varalaxmi) receives a visit from a fortune teller. The fortune teller predicts that their luck will change dramatically overnight, and it is up to them to make the best or worst of it. On the same day, a stranger, Arjunan (Santhosh Pratap), arrives at their house and asks if he can stay there for the night. While initially reluctant, they take him in, and increasingly become comfortable with him.

Arjunan gets to know about the financial issues that the family is having. The family has been struggling due to severe drought in the village and Mallika could not get married as they are unable to give the dowry demanded. Arjunan shows them a box full of money and jewels and says that his luck changed by working hard, assuring them that so could theirs. Mallika, enchanted by the riches and Arjunan's good looks, tries to seduce him, however, he scolds her for her behaviour. Mallika plans to kill Arjunan and steal the money and jewels to solve their problems. Even though her parents are hesitant, they agree to the plan as they are in need of money.

After a couple of hiccups, including a plan to poison Arjunan which goes awry, Mallika kills Arjunan by slitting his throat while he is sleeping. Meanwhile, Karuppusamy leaves for a local liquor shop as he does not want to be in his house and gets excessively drunk. The sympathetic bar boy tells Karuppasamy to go home by revealing something about Arjunan. Karuppusamy is shocked by the revelation and rushes home to tell the family the truth. Realizing that Arjunan has been murdered, Karuppasamy laments that Arjunan was none other than their long-lost son Karunakaran, who had run away when he was 10 years old. Arjunan had come back to visit his family, after working hard to earn money and settling himself. Arjunan enquired about his family members to the local bar owner and the bar boy before visiting their house. The family is devastated knowing the truth. They all consume the poison intended for Karunakaran, and Karuppusamy uses all the cotton in the house to set it on fire and burns himself along with it.

An in-credits voiceover shows the diary entry Karunakaran wrote before he slept, where he decides to leave the money and jewels at the house and leave it as a stranger before the morning. He had originally planned a prank to not reveal his identity just for a day. But since his sister had, out of her necessity, tried to seduce him, he changes his mind to save his sister from forever being in disgust of her actions.

== Cast ==
- Varalaxmi Sarathkumar as Mallika
- Santhosh Prathap as Arjunan (Karunakaran)
- Easwari Rao as Valliyammal
- Charle as Karuppusamy
- Manobala as Swamiji
- Subramaniam Siva as Naidu
- Jayakumar as Fortune Teller
- Sendrayan as Kannappan, blind flute seller
- Thangadurai as Police Constable
- Kavitha Bharathi as Police Constable
- Meesai Rajendran as Grocery Shopkeeper
- TSR Srinivasan as Veeraiyan
- Yazar as Arrack Shop Worker
- Imran
- Kalyani Madhavi

== Production ==
The shooting of the film began on 28 October 2022.

== Reception ==
The film was released on 10 March 2023 across Tamil Nadu. Logesh Balachandran from The Times of India gave 3 stars out of 5 stars and noted that "Though Kondraal Paavam has flaws, the intense characterization and the screenplay make it worth a watch." A critic of Dina Thanthi gave a mixture of review and said that "It is special that director Dayal Padmanabhan has directed the crime and thriller story without boring it. He has satisfied the fans by equally mixing all the feelings like sentiment, love, and betrayal." Chandhini R from The New Indian Express noted that " An effective suspense drama shouldered by compelling performances" and gave 3 stars out of 5 stars.

A critic from Dinamalar gave 3 rating out of 5 ratings.
