= Naagini 2 =

Zee Kannada TV Serial

- Genre: Drama; Thriller
- Created by: K S Ramji
- Based on: Phir Laut Aayi Naagin
- Written by: Mahesh Rao; Sacheth Bhat
- Directed by: K S Ramji
- Creative director: Ramji
- Starring: Namrata Gowda; Ninaad Haritsa
- Theme music composer: Karthik Sharma
- Opening theme: "Naagini..." by Aishwarya Rangarajan
- Country of origin: India
- Original language: Kannada
- No. of episodes: 762

Production
- Producer: Ramji
- Production locations: Bangalore, Karanataka
- Editor: Roopkanth Nagaraj
- Camera setup: Multi-camera
- Running time: 22 minutes

Original release
- Network: Zee Kannada
- Release: 17 February 2020 – 3 March 2023

Related
- Naagini

Naagini 2 (transl. Female serpent 2) is a 2020 Indian Kannada-language television series which aired on Zee Kannada. It premiered on 17 February 2020. The series is a sequel to Naagini.

== Plot ==
The film begins as Shivani, a shape-shifting serpent, enters Earth to take revenge on the people who killed her husband, and to find Nagamani. She learns from Nagamatha that her husband Adishesha had been reborn on Earth, and will help to find Nagamani. Shivani finds out that Adishesha is between Trishool and Trivikram, who were in the same house where Trishool is the son of Nandisha (servant) and Trivikram is the son of Digvijay (Owner). Both of them were born at the same date and time, and Digvijay and his gang, including Nandisha, were the culprits who killed Adishesha and stole Nagamani.

Later Nandisha's mother Mahamaayi reveals that Trishool is actually Digvijay's son, and Trivikram is Nandisha's son. She exchanged the babies at birth because she wanted revenge on Digvijay, who stole Nagamani from Naagalok with the help of Tryambaka, before she could get her hands on Nagamani.

Trivikram and Trishool have the same snake mole. Trivikram is Adhisesha according to Shivani and Tryambaka. Trivikram remembers nothing about Adhisesha. Trishool and Trivikram fall in love with Shivani. Shivani recognizes the snake print in Trivikram and decides to marry him and rejects Trishool. Digvijay and his family find out that Trishool is his real son. It is discovered that Trishool is Adhishesha. But Trishool has no memories or powers. Digvijay learns about Adishesha's reincarnation and is thinking to kill him with the help of his son, not knowing his son is actually Adhishesha.

Trivikram starts to hate Trishool as he thinks Trishool snatched his happiness because he is Digvijay's real son and Trivikram is the son of a driver. Trivikram also learns that Trishool is in love with Shivani. One night, he dreams of Trishool marrying Shivani and seeks help from his grandmother. Under her assistance seeks help from another shape shifting serpent mayangani who lives in Mayadweep away from Naaglok after she lost her love, to kill Trishool. Mayangani tries to kill Trishool, but her powers don't work on him. She understands that he is Adhishesha with whom she was in love years back, but he rejected her because he loved Shivani. Mayangani is happy as she learns about Adhishesha's rebirth and plans to pursue him and become the naagrani of Naaglok. On the day of the Trivikram-Shivani marriage, Trishool forcefully marries her because Lord Shiva's power tells him that only he has the right to marry her as their love is for all births. Shivani, not knowing that Trishool is Adhishesha, starts to hate him as she thinks Trivikram is Adhishesha and he is the reason for her separation from Adishesha and Naaglok. Mayangani, along with Trivikram, make plans to separate Shivani and Trishool. Myangani's also calls Tryambaka to kill Shivani. Later Shivani kills Mayangani with the help of Thrikkala Muni and her own powers. Shivani uses her power and finds out that Adhisesha is none other than Trishool. Mayangani curses Shivani that Adhisesha would never love her. As per the time runs, Shivani faces the Challenge to make Trishool understand her love for him. Mahamaye is born again to instruct Trivikram. Trivikram learns about Trishool and Shivani relationship. Trivikram decides to teach Sivani a lesson. Trishul learns that Trivikram is torturing her and the fight begins between Trishul and Trivikram where Trivikram pushes Trishul to Pathala Darbha. A man complains that he had seen Trivikram and Trishul fight. Digvijay questions Trivikram. Trivikram talks rudely to Digvijay and the mole scares Digvijay and he learns that Trivikram was the person who had attacked him last time. Family members request Digvijay to take Trivikram back home. Later, Trivikram reveals Digvijay and his friends secret to Naandisha and his powers and how he obtained it. Later Nandisha tells his mother that Trivikram has no legal right to have powers but Trishul has. He answers that Trishul is her original grandson not Trivikram. Trivikram learns that Trishul is Adishesha for whom Shivani came to Earth and Adishesha can be killed only with the nagamani. Trivikram finds that nagmani is in Digvijay's hand and asks Digvijay for it after which a fight takes place and the nagmani from Digvijay's hand falls into Pathala Darbha where Trishul is present. Due to nagmani's power Trishul reaches Earth. Eventually Shivani is killed by Takshaka (Trayambaka's twin brother). Shailu, with the same figure of Shivaniö appears.

== Cast ==
=== Main ===
- Namratha Gowda as
  - Naagini, a shape-shifting serpent/Adishesha's wife (main form); Queen Of Naagalok
  - Shivani, Trishul's wife (human form); was Trivikram's love interest
  - Clone Shivani, an illusion created from Shivani's shadow by Bhairava Baba
  - Shailu, Shivani's look-alike artist
  - Goddess Parvathi, in the Story of Shumbha Nishumbha told bye Digvijay's Mother/Grandmother of Trishul
- Ninaad Harithsa / Deepak Mahadev as
  - Trishul Roy, Adishesha's reincarnated life; son of Digvijay and Damayanti. Adoptive son of Nandisha and Madhumathi. Reena's brother and Trivikram's adoptive brother. Shivani's husband. Mayangani's love interest.
  - Adishesha, King of Nagaloka; main form and previous incarnation of Trishul
- Karthik Jayaram as Adishesha; king of Naaglok; husband of Naagini; Trishool's previous birth.
- Deepika Das as Amrutha, a shape-shifting snake from Naagar, in a special appearance from the previous Naagini series

=== Recurring ===
- Pranav Sridhar /Nagarajun Ballappa
  - as Trivikram; son of Nandisha and Madhumathi; adoptive son of Digvijay and Damayanthi; Trishool and Reena's adoptive brother; Shivani's ex-fiancé.
- Aiswarya Shindogi as Mayangani, shape-shifting snake wants to marry Adhishesha and become the queen of Naagloka.
- Mohan Shankar as Digvijay. Trishool and Reena's father; Trivikram's adoptive father; he killed Adhishesha to acquire Naagmani.
- Muniraju as Nandisha; Trivikram's father; Trishool's adoptive father; Digvijay's driver and friend
- Vijay (Mahadevi Serial Fame)
  - as Trayambaka, A Powerful Tantrik, The One Leads Digvijay gang to Acquire Nagamani
  - as Takshaka, A Powerful Tantrik and Brother of Trayambaka; Who Captures Shivani Soul and Burnt her Body with help of Bhupathi
- Rashmi as Neeli a shape-shifting serpent who came to earth to help Shivani
- Ambarish Sarangi as Dhananjay, Digvijay's Brother and Disguised form of Digvijay
- Marina Tara as Nagamatha, Adhishesha's mother.
- Shwetha as Madhumati, Trivikram's mother; Trishool's adoptive mother.
- Laxman as Vishakantha; Digvijay's friend helped him kill Adhishesha and acquire Naagmani.
- Jeevan Neenasam as Dandapani
- Shashi as Samrat
- Prithvi Subbiah as Bhupathi
- Prithviraj as Ajit, An Garuda from Garudaloka
- Ananthavelu as Tavkal Rehman, Muslim Mowlvi
- Megha SV
  - as Reena; Digvjay and Damayanti's daughter; Trishool's sister
- Surya Kiran as
  - Govinda, Trishool and Reena's uncle; Damayanti's brother
  - Bhairava Baba, Digvijay's evil guru (Special Appearance from Previous Naagini Series)
- Prakash as Sambashiva. Digvijay's friend helped him kill Adhishesha and acquire Naagmani.
- Jennifer Antony /Rekha Sagar
  - as Damayanti; Trishool and Reena's mother; Trivikram's adoptive mother; Digvijay's wife
- JK as Naganetra, Head of Naga Clan and took a form as Aghori by the curse of Mohini
- Pooja Durganna as Krishne, One of Sorcerer who Gives Dhananjay form to Digvijay
- Deepika (Comedy Khiliadigalu) as Dodmalli
- Riddhi Ashok as Chikmalli
- Mahendra Prasad as Pakru
- Hmt Vijay As Pashupathi, Owner of Drama Company
- Rekha Das as Pashupathi's Wife and Makeup Artist of Drama Company
- Puneeth Babu as Mahaguru of Nagaloka
- Praveen Atharva as Seshanaga
- Darshini Nagaraj as Mohini
- Deepak Mahadev as Abhay, Investigation officer/Disguised form of Trishul
- Ahmad Harhash as Rajmati Singhmar
- Shringeri Ramayya as Vasudeva Acharya
- Vinaya Gowda as Nishumbha, Special Appearance
- Cheluvaraj as Shumbha, Special Appearance
- RK Chandan as lord Shiva
- Jagadish Kumar as Aghoriq
- Darshini gowda as Sahasra
- Chandu Gowda as Vishal, Special appearance from series Trinayani during Crossover episode
- Ashika Padukone as Nayani, Special appearance from serial Trinayani during Crossover episode

== Production ==
Popular director and producer, Ramji, produces and directs this series. Trinity VFX creates the graphics.

== Reception ==
Naagini 2 delivered 11+ million impressions in the TRP charts within its first week of airing. It reached the top five position for most watched Kannada television program.
