= Aa Karaala Ratri =

2018 film by Dayal Padmanabhan

- Directed by: Dayal Padmanabhan
- Screenplay by: Dayal Padmanabhan
- Dialogues by: Naveen Krishna
- Story by: Mohan Habbu
- Produced by: D Pictures
- Starring: Karthik Jayaram; Anupama Gowda; Rangayana Raghu; Veena Sundar
- Cinematography: P. K. H. Das
- Edited by: Sri CrazyMindzz
- Music by: R. S. Ganesh Narayanan
- Production company: D Pictures
- Distributed by: D Distributors
- Release date: 13 July 2018
- Country: India
- Language: Kannada

Aa Karaala Ratri (transl. 'That Intense Dark Night') is a 2018 Indian Kannada-language thriller film directed and produced by Dayal Padmanabhan. The film is based on a Kannada play by Mohan Habbu which was translated from the tragic English play Lithuania by Rupert Brooke.

In September 2020, director Dayal announced that he will be directing the Telugu remake of the movie which would be produced by Allu Aravind. The Telugu remake titled Anaganaga O Athidhi was directly released on the Aha. He had also revealed that he would be directing the Tamil remake. The Tamil version, titled Kondraal Paavam, was released in 2023. The film was remade in Malayalam in 2023 as Pakalum Paathiravum, making it the fifth Kannada film to be remade in three other South Indian languages after School Master, Sampathige Savaal, Devara Kannu and U Turn. Both the Tamil and Malayalam versions were released in March 2023 within one week of each other.

== Plot ==
In 1980, Chenna Keshava is a wandering writer who travels across rural India documenting the lives and experiences of ordinary people. While journeying through a drought-stricken region, he seeks shelter at the home of Muthanna, his wife Gowramma, and their daughter Mallika "Malli". Once landowners and cotton-growers, the family has fallen into debt due to crop failures and mounting medical expenses. Having mortgaged their land to a wealthy lender named Veeranna, they now work on the same property as labourers in an effort to repay their loan. Impressed by their honesty and hospitality, Chenna Keshava stays with them and offers financial help, but the family declines.

Malli, however, becomes fascinated by the wealth Chenna Keshava carries in his suitcase, which contains money and jewellery. When he agrees for her to try on some of the ornaments, she begins to imagine a life free from poverty and debt. Interpreting a series of omens, including a lizard falling on her shoulder and that of a fortune-teller's prediction as signs that the traveller is destined to die, she persuades her mother that his death could secure their future. Though initially horrified, Gowramma reluctantly agrees. Muthanna overhears their discussion and insists that he will handle the matter himself, asking them not to take any action before leaving for a local bar.

Unable to bring herself to commit murder directly, Gowramma decides to poison Chenna Keshava's dinner by mixing toxic leaves into the chicken curry prepared for him. Before he can eat, two policemen arrive searching for a thief on the run and demand food. Fearing the poisoned meal may be served to them, Gowramma deliberately spills the plate. The family's pet dog consumes the food and dies, confirming its lethality. Shaken by the incident and overcome by guilt, Gowramma abandons her plan. After the policemen leave, Chenna Keshava eats a fresh meal and goes to sleep. Angered by her mother's hesitation, Malli resolves to act on her own, slitting his throat, killing him. At the same time, Muthanna learns a devastating truth at the bar. A young worker reveals that the guest staying in his house is actually Subbu, Muthanna's long-lost son who had run away as a child years earlier. Having returned under a different identity, Subbu intended to reveal himself to his family at the right moment. Realising that his son's life could be in danger, Muthanna rushes home in despair, only to find his son murdered. His revelation leaves Gowramma and Malli consumed by remorse, and the two eat the poisoned food, collapsing beside Subbu's body. In an act of grief and devastation, Muthanna spreads unginned cotton throughout the room, sets it ablaze and perishes along with his family.

== Cast ==
- Karthik Jayaram as Channa Keshava / Subbu
  - Varun as young Subbu
- Anupama Gowda as Mallika "Malli"
  - Lakshya as young Malli
- Rangayana Raghu as Muthanna
- Veena Sundar as Gowramma
- Naveen Krishna as Mahalinga, a fortune-teller (cameo)
- Navarasan as Kannappa, a blind man
- Sihi Kahi Chandru as a Harikatha performer
- Jaya Srinivasan
- Srinivasa Prabhu
- Victory Vasu as Veeranna
- Sujatha Hiremath

== Production ==
The film is based on a Kannada play by Mohan Habbu which was based on the play Lithuania by Rupert Brooke. Director S. K. Bhagavan had revealed that during the making of 1978 Kannada film Shankar Guru, he had narrated this story to actor Rajkumar.The film was planned to be shot in Ladakh and some preparation was undertaken, but in the end Rajkumar backed out as he felt the story was too dark.

Impressed by Mohan Habbu's story, Dayal decided to acquire the rights and make it into a full-length feature film. When Dayal entered the Bigg Boss house as a contestant his idea was strengthened when his fellow contestants JK and Anupama Gowda agreed to be a part of the film if it was made. Dayal then completed the entire script, along with co-dialogue writer Naveen Krishna, and narrated the full script to JK and Anupama.

Once the lead pair was fixed, Dayal zeroed in on Rangayana Raghu and Veena Sundar for other pivotal roles. Many of Dayal's contestant friends from Bigg Boss Kannada like Jaya Srinivasan, Ashitha and Diwakar appeared in the film.

== Reception ==
The News Minute mentions that "seasoned" actors and "clever" director came together hand-in-hand to make an interesting suspense thriller flick. Shyam Prasad S of Bangalore Mirror said the film is one of the best movies of the year and credited the convincing performances and brilliant technical execution for the success.

== Awards and nominations ==
Award (Note: Awards, festivals and organizations are in alphabetical order.)	Date of ceremony (Note: Date is linked to the article about the awards held that year, wherever possible.)	Category	Recipient(s)	Result	Ref.
Karnataka State Film Awards	10 January 2020	First Best Film	Dayal Padmanabhan	Won	
Karnataka State Film Awards	10 January 2020	Best Director	Dayal Padmanabhan	Won	
Karnataka State Film Awards	10 January 2020	Best Supporting Actress	Veena Sundar	Won	
South Indian International Movie Awards	15 August 2019	Best Supporting Actor	Karthik Jayaram	Nominated	
