= Maaligai =

2021 Indian Tamil period thriller film directed by Dil Satya

- Poster
- Directed by: Dil Satya
- Written by: Dil Satya
- Produced by: Kamal Bohra; Rajesh Kumar
- Starring: Andrea Jeremiah; Karthik Jayaram
- Cinematography: K. Ramsingh
- Edited by: Greyson A. C. A.
- Music by: Sri Krupa; Mahesh Mahadev
- Production companies: Shanthi Telefilms; Bhavani Entertainment
- Release date: 29 October 2021 (Hindi Zee Cinema release)
- Country: India
- Language: Tamil

Maaligai (transl. Mansion) is a 2021 Indian Tamil-language period thriller film directed by Dil Satya and starring Andrea Jeremiah and Karthik Jayaram.

== Cast ==
- Andrea Jeremiah as ACP S. Shanti
- Karthik Jayaram as Vishnu / Vishnuvardhan
- Ashutosh Rana as King Vikramaditya
- K. S. Ravikumar as O. K. Kumar
- Ali as Vishnuvardhan's uncle
- Manobala as Power Paandi
- Aadukalam Naren as Shanti's father
- Meera Krishnan as Shanti's mother
- Jangiri Madhumitha as Arthi Krishnan
- Kovai Sarala as storyteller

== Production ==
The film began production in 2019 and was supposed to be made in Kannada by director Dil Satya and produced by Hindi producers, but it was made as a Tamil film due to Andrea Jeremiah's popularity there. Dil Satya and Karthik Jayaram from the Kannada film industry forayed into Tamil cinema through this film.

Andrea plays an ACP, who upon investigating a palace learns about her past as a princess. She accepted the role since she got to play two characters, which is rarely offered to heroines. K. S. Ravikumar accepted the film due to cinematographer K. Ramsingh, whose mentor Ashok Rajan worked on many of his directorial films starting with his second film Cheran Pandian (1991).

The film was shot in Baroda, Chennai, Jaipur and Kochi.

== Soundtrack ==
Track listing
No.	Title	Lyrics	Music	Length
1.	"Omkara"	T. Rajendar	Mahesh Mahadev

== Release ==
The Hindi dubbed version was released on 29 October 2021 on Zee Cinema.
