= Baa Baaro Rasika =

- Film poster
- Directed by: Dayal Padmanabhan
- Written by: Dayal Padmanabhan
- Produced by: G Prasad Reddy, D Sayendra Reddy
- Starring: Sunil Raoh, Ramya Krishna, Ashitha
- Cinematography: Chandru
- Edited by: Vinod Manohar
- Music by: Mahesh
- Production company: Shanti Sree Creations
- Release date: 18 June 2004
- Running time: 137 min
- Country: India
- Language: Kannada

Baa Baaro Rasika ( transl. Come My Admirer) is a 2004 Indian Kannada-language romantic film directed by Dayal Padmanabhan and starring Sunil Raoh, Ramya Krishna and Ashitha in the lead roles. The songs were composed by Mahesh. The film was a box office success. The film's title is based on a song from Raktha Kanneeru (2003).

The film was dubbed to Telugu as Vayasu Pilichindi and in Tamil as Vaa Manmadhan Vaa.

== Synopsis ==
The film begins on a college campus and ends there as well, with the final scene depicting Sunil’s last days at college. There are no mundane classroom settings or typical heroics. The plot focuses on Sunil's love life, introducing the heroine, Ashita. Serious about his career, Sunil starts job hunting, avoiding the usual romantic clichés of love songs in parks and pubs. He secures a job under a misandrist (man-hater) named Ramya (played by Ramya Krishna), who introduces the film's villain. However, the identity of the villain remains unclear until the interval. As the story progresses, this man-hater begins to develop an interest in Sunil, who is younger than her, adding a layer of romance and glamour. Caught between two women, Sunil ultimately navigates his way out of this complicated situation. The reason behind Ramya’s misandry remains a mystery until the end.

== Cast ==
- Sunil Raoh as Vishwa
- Ramya Krishna as Ramya
- Ashitha as Sona
- Ramesh Bhat
- Vinayak Joshi
- Nagashekar
- Ganesh as Vishwa's friend
- A. S. Murthy as Channappa
- Karthik Sharma

== Production ==
The film was launched on 16 February 2004. The first schedule took place in Mysore.

== Soundtrack ==
All the songs are composed and scored by Mahesh.

Sl No	Song title	Singer(s)	Lyrics
1	"Sakhi O Sakhi"	Rajesh Krishnan, Nanditha	Shashank
2	"Dheem Dheem Tanana"	Hemanth Kumar, Anuradha Sriram	Shashank
3	"Catch Me Da"	Sujay, K. S. Chithra, Shamita Malnad	Shashank
4	"Muddadu Baaro"	Malgudi Subha	Manjunath Rao
5	"Hotthu Gotthu"	P. Unnikrishnan, K. S. Chithra	Manjunath Rao

== Reception ==
A critic from indiainfo wrote that "Overall BAA BAARO RASIKA is an excellent film. A must watch because Sunil is superb, Ashita and Ramya look great and a novel story". S. N. Deepak of Deccan Herald wrote "Director Dayal has put in good efforts to make this film a mass entertainer by mixing love, comedy and action sequences. Dialogues, penned by him, are also good. He has tried to keep the story interesting throughout the film". A critic from Viggy wrote, "Though the story thread sounds similar to Freaky Chakra and Ekh Chotisi Love Story, this movie has no influence nor similar. Baa Baaro Rasika is worth watching".
