= Maruthi Nagar Police Station =

2023 Indian Tamil film

- Release poster
- Directed by: Dayal Padmanabhan
- Written by: Dayal Padmanabhan
- Produced by: Dayal Padmanabhan
- Starring: Varalaxmi Sarathkumar; Arav
- Cinematography: Shekhar Chandra
- Edited by: Preethi Mohan; Babu A. Srivastava
- Music by: Manikanth Kadri
- Production company: D Pictures
- Release date: 19 May 2023
- Country: India
- Language: Tamil

Maruthi Nagar Police Station also known by the initials MNPS, is a 2023 Indian Tamil-language crime thriller film written and directed by Dayal Padmanabhan. The film features an ensemble cast including Varalaxmi Sarathkumar, Arav, Santhosh Prathap, Mahat Raghavendra, and Yasar. It is produced by Dayal Padmanabhan under the banner of D Pictures. The film had a direct-to-streaming release via Aha on 19 May 2023 to negative reviews from critics.

== Plot ==
One night, Jaishankar witnesses a group of gangsters kidnapping a young girl and taking her into a factory while he is on his way home. He records the incident on his phone and goes to a nearby police station to report it. Inspector Gurunathan accompanies Jai to the factory to investigate. However, Gurunathan is revealed to be working with the gang and betrays Jai. With Gurunathan's help, the gang kills Jai. Before his death, Jai manages to send the video of the kidnapping to his friends.

A few months later, while on patrol, Police Inspector Archana arrests two men for fighting in public. Later, a man arrives at the police station to report his stolen purse, while another man reports that his dog has gone missing. While the four men wait at the station, Archana is secretly seen handing a gun to one of them.

It is revealed that Archana, the two men arrested for fighting, and the man reporting his stolen purse are all friends of Jai who grew up with him in the same orphanage. After receiving the video from Jai, they began investigating his death. Using the video and Jai's phone tracking records, they discover that the gang led by Naga was responsible. They kidnap Naga's gang member Seenu and torture him until he confesses what happened. However, due to a lack of evidence, they are unable to arrest Naga and Gurunathan. As a result, they decide to take justice into their own hands by killing everyone responsible for Jai's death.

Just as they are about to kill Seenu, he escapes. The following day, they learn from the news that someone else has killed Seenu. They decide not to investigate further and continue with their plan to kill Naga and Gurunathan. Archana transfers to Gurunathan's police station so that she can work with him and find an opportunity to kill him. They later devise a plan to meet at the police station under different pretenses. Once Gurunathan returns, one person will cut the electricity, another will shoot him, and another will dispose of the gun before the power is restored.

The group waits for Gurunathan to return so they can execute their plan. However, shortly after Gurunathan arrives, Naga also comes to the station and begins speaking with him. Due to the unexpected situation, Archana hesitates to give the signal. Later, the power at the station is cut, and two gunshots are heard in the darkness. When the electricity returns, Naga and Gurunathan are found dead. The man who had reported his missing dog has disappeared.

Archana asks her friends whether they carried out the plan without her approval, but they deny doing so. She follows police procedure and informs ACP Nedunchezhiyan, who takes charge of the investigation.

Forensic examination reveals that the bullet in Naga's body was fired from Gurunathan's police revolver, which was still in his hand after the shooting. The police therefore assume that Gurunathan killed Naga. However, the bullet recovered from Gurunathan's body cannot be identified, and the weapon used to shoot him is missing. The man who reported his missing dog is later found, but he denies any involvement. He claims that he fled after hearing the gunshots because he feared the situation had become dangerous.

A witness outside the station states that during the power cut, he saw one man run away, and another man throw a gun into a manhole before returning inside. Following this lead, the police recover a gun from the sewer that matches the bullet found in Gurunathan's body. Shiva, one of Archana's friends who was supposed to dispose of the gun according to their plan, later confesses to Archana that after hearing the gunshots, someone threw a gun toward him. Confused and frightened, he threw it into the sewer.

The case is officially closed, with Nedunchezhiyan concluding that Naga and Gurunathan shot each other during the power cut. However, Archana remains unconvinced and continues investigating. Through Jai's phone records, she discovers that Jai had contacted Nedunchezhiyan shortly before his death. She then checks Nedunchezhiyan's phone records and finds that he had also been in contact with Naga. Concluding that Nedunchezhiyan is connected to the events, Archana and her three friends confront him.

Nedunchezhiyan reveals that he is actually Jai's brother. When Jai was young, he was kidnapped by one of his father's enemies and eventually ended up in an orphanage. Nedunchezhiyan only discovered Jai's identity recently and contacted him in an attempt to reunite with him. Jai sent him the kidnapping video before disappearing.

Nedunchezhiyan explains that he began investigating the case himself and witnessed Archana's group kidnapping Seenu. He secretly followed them and monitored their phone conversations to learn about their plan. He confesses that he killed Seenu and devised his own method of avenging Jai's death. Using his power and influence, he manipulated Naga and Gurunathan into planning to kill each other.

Nedunchezhiyan separately convinced both men that he would arrange a meeting between them and cut the station's power, allowing them to kill one another during the blackout. Unknown to either man, Nedunchezhiyan made the same suggestion to both of them, causing Naga and Gurunathan to shoot each other to death.

== Cast ==
- Varalaxmi Sarathkumar as Inspector Archana
- Arav as ACP S. Nedunchezhiyan
- Santhosh Prathap as Bala
- Mahat Raghavendra as Jaishankar
- Vivek Rajgopal
- Yasar Arafat
- Meesai Rajendran as T. Rajendran
- Ravi Venkatraman
- Sundar Raj
- Amit Bhargav as Inspector Gurunathan
- Subramaniam Siva as Naga
- Chakravarthy Chandrachud as Zaheer
- Shruti Nayak
- Joe Simon
- Jayann
- Vinod Bharathi
- Yash Shetty
- Moorthy
- Vijayan
- Balaji
- Nambi

== Production ==
The film's shoot was completed within 21 days. Later the trailer was released and announced the film would premiere directly on the streaming service Aha on 19 May 2023.

== Reception ==
Praveen Sudevan critic of The Hindu wrote that "The performances, too, fail to elevate the underwritten characters. It’s just difficult to care for any of them in this whodunnit. Or, I-don’t-care-whodunnit." Haricharan Pudipeddi, a critic for the Hindustan Times, stated that "Varalaxmi gets a meatier part and she does a pretty neat job.". Janani K of India Today gave 2 stars out of 5 and stated that "Maruthi Nagar Police Station suffers from predictability. Even the so-called twists and turns in the climax do not add up to the story because you are already exhausted by then." P Sangeetha of OTT Play gave 2.5 stars out of 5 and wrote that "Dayal Padmanabhan's film might have its twists and turns, but fails short of becoming an impactful film due to the many loose ends and predictability."
