= Puta 109 =

2018 Kannada-language film

- Directed by: Dayal Padmanabhan
- Written by: Naveen Krishna (dialogues)
- Screenplay by: Dayal Padmanabhan
- Story by: R. Aravindraj
- Produced by: Dayal Padmanabhan; Avinash U. Shetty
- Starring: Naveen Krishna; Karthik Jayaram
- Edited by: Sri CrazyMindzz
- Music by: Ganesh Narayanan
- Production company: D Pictures
- Release date: 16 November 2018
- Country: India
- Language: Kannada

Puta 109 is a 2018 Indian Kannada-language crime thriller directed by Dayal Padmanabhan and starring Naveen Krishna and Karthik Jayaram.

== Synopsis ==
A police officer (Karthik Jayaram) comes to the residence of a crime novelist (Naveen Krishna) for investigation. The police officer has come to investigate the death of the Novelist's wife who was murdered recently. The Suspect list has everyone from the house maid to a family friend.

The crime novelist patiently answers all the questions but will the police officer get his answer or will it lead to more questions.

What does Puta (Page) 109 have to do with this murder or investigation?

== Cast ==
- Naveen Krishna as a novelist
- Karthik Jayaram as a cop
- Vaishnavi Chandran Menon
- Anupama Gowda
- Sri CrazyMindzz
- Victory Vasu

== Production ==
The film was shot within a week.

== Soundtrack ==
The music is composed by RS Ganesh Narayanan. The title track was rendered by Ranjith and Divya Kupuswamy.

== Reception ==
A critic from The Times of India opined that "Puta 109 is a commendable effort, given how the film tries to tread unexplored territories in the Kannada film industry". A critic from Bangalore Mirror wrote that "For those with a liking for the offbeat this film is one more on the list of films to watch".
