= Iravan (film) =

2023 Indian film

- Directed by: Rams Ranga
- Written by: Rams Ranga; Kanthraju Kaddipudi
- Produced by: Dr. Niranthara Ganesh
- Starring: Jayaram Karthik; Adhvithi Shetty; Vivek Patil; Avinash; Krishna Hebbale
- Cinematography: Devendra
- Edited by: K M Prakash
- Music by: S Pradeep Varma
- Release date: 16 June 2023
- Country: India
- Language: Kannada

Iravan is a 2023 Indian Kannada-language action, thriller film produced by Dr. Niranthara Ganesh and directed by Rams Ranga, starring Jayaram Karthik, Adhvithi Shetty and Vivek Patil with an ensemble supporting cast. The film was written by the director himself along with Kanthraju Kaddipudi

== Premise ==
When a young student studying abroad receives the devastating news of his father's unexpected and suspicious death, he is driven to uncover the truth behind the tragedy. As he delves deeper into the circumstances surrounding his father's demise, he uncovers evidence of political involvement or a powerful medical mafia. Fueled by grief and a thirst for justice, he embarks on a relentless quest for revenge, determined to expose those responsible and bring them to justice.

== Cast ==
- Jayaram Karthik as Mithun Chakravarthy
- Adhvithi Shetty
- Vivek Patil
- Avinash as Dr Satya Murthy
- Krishna Hebbale

== Production ==
The film is the debut production of doctor turned social worker Dr. Niranthara Ganesh. The film was initially planned to release on OTT platforms, but later the team decided to go for a theatrical release.

== Release ==
The film had a statewide release on 16 June 2023.
