= Anupama Gowda =

Indian actress (born 1991)

- Born: March 19, 1991 (age 35); Bengaluru, Karnataka, India
- Occupation: Actress
- Years active: 2003–present

Anupama Gowda is an Indian actress and television presenter who primarily works in Kannada-language films and television shows. She is known for her work in Aa Karaala Ratri (2018) and Thrayambakam (2019). The latter won her the Karnataka State Film Award for Best Actress.

== Career ==
Gowda started her career as a child artist with Lankesh Patrike in 2003. She made her television debut with the reality show Halli Duniya before playing one of the leads in Nagaari (2015), but the film was unnoticed at the box office. She starred in the soap opera Chi Sou Savitri before playing dual roles in the television series Akka.

In late 2017, she came into the limelight after participating in the fifth season of Big Boss Kannada. She debuted as an anchor for the television show Kannada Kogile. In 2018, she starred in Aa Karaala Ratri with Karthik Jayaram and was acclaimed for her performance. She played a journalist in Thrayambakam (2019) starring Raghavendra Rajkumar and RJ Rohit. She hosted the Kannada-language awards for the 8th South Indian International Movie Awards with actor Vijay Raghavendra. She also worked as an anchor for Majaa Bharatha before leaving the show due to its interference with her film career.

She also starred in the indie film The Fallen are connected directed by Urvi fame Pradeep Varma.

She made her comeback to television in the role of anchor in the reality show Raja Rani in 2021. She then went on to host many reality shows in the next few years.

== Filmography ==
All films are in Kannada.

Year	Film	Role	Notes	Ref
2003	Lankesh Patrike		Child actor	
2015	Nagaari			
2018	Aa Karaala Ratri	Mallika		
2018	Puta 109			
2019	Thrayambakam	Namana		
2020	Benkiyalli Aralida Hoovu	Sukanya		
TBA	The Fallen are Connected†	Dwaya		

== Television ==
Year	Title	Role	Notes	Ref
	Halli Duniya			
2010-2019	Chi Sou Savithri			
2014-2017	Akka	Devika, Bhoomika	Dual role	
2017-2018	Bigg Boss Kannada	Contestant	Evicted on Day 98	
2017-2019	Majaa Bharatha	Anchor		
2018	Kannada Kogile	Anchor		
2021	Raja Rani	Anchor		
2021-2022	Nannamma Super Star	Anchor		
2021-2022	Bigg Boss Kannada	Contestant	Evicted on Day 84	
2021	Suvarna Superstars	Anchor		
2023	Suvarna Jackpot	Anchor		
2025	Girls vs Boys	Anchor		
2025	Kwatle Kitchen	Anchor		

== Awards and nominations ==
Year (Note: It is the year in which the ceremony was held)	Award	Category	Work	Result	Ref.
2019	South Indian International Movie Awards	Best Female Debut – Kannada	Aa Karaala Ratri	Won	
2025	Karnataka State Film Awards	Best Actress	Thrayambakam	Won	
