= RJ Rohith =

Indianr

- Born: Bangalore
- Occupation: Actor, Radio Jockey

RJ Rohith is an Indian actor and radio jockey who works in Kannada-language films and television.

== Career ==
Rohith is a radio jockey who voiced the shows Take it Easy and Big Nayaka on BIG FM 92.7. He was a contestant on the second season of Bigg Boss Kannada and worked as a host for the television show Divided. After playing a supporting role in Bombay Mittai, he made his lead film debut with Karvva in which he portrayed one of the lead roles. The film was a success upon release. In addition to starring in the film, Rohith also co-wrote the film. He went on to play the lead role in Buckasura (2018) with director Navaneeth, whom he worked with in Karvva.

== Filmography ==
- All films are in Kannada.

Year	Film	Role	Notes
2015	Bombay Mittai	Satish	
2016	Karvva	Rohith	Also writer
2018	Buckasura	Arya (Money)	Also producer
2019	Thrayambakam		
2019	Rustum	Kiran	

== Television ==
Year	Title	Role	Channel	Notes
2014	Bigg Boss Kannada Season 2	Contestant	Star Suvarna	
2014	Divided	Host	Zee Kannada	
