= Bolwar Mahammad Kunhi =

Indian writer

Bolwar Mahamad Kunhi
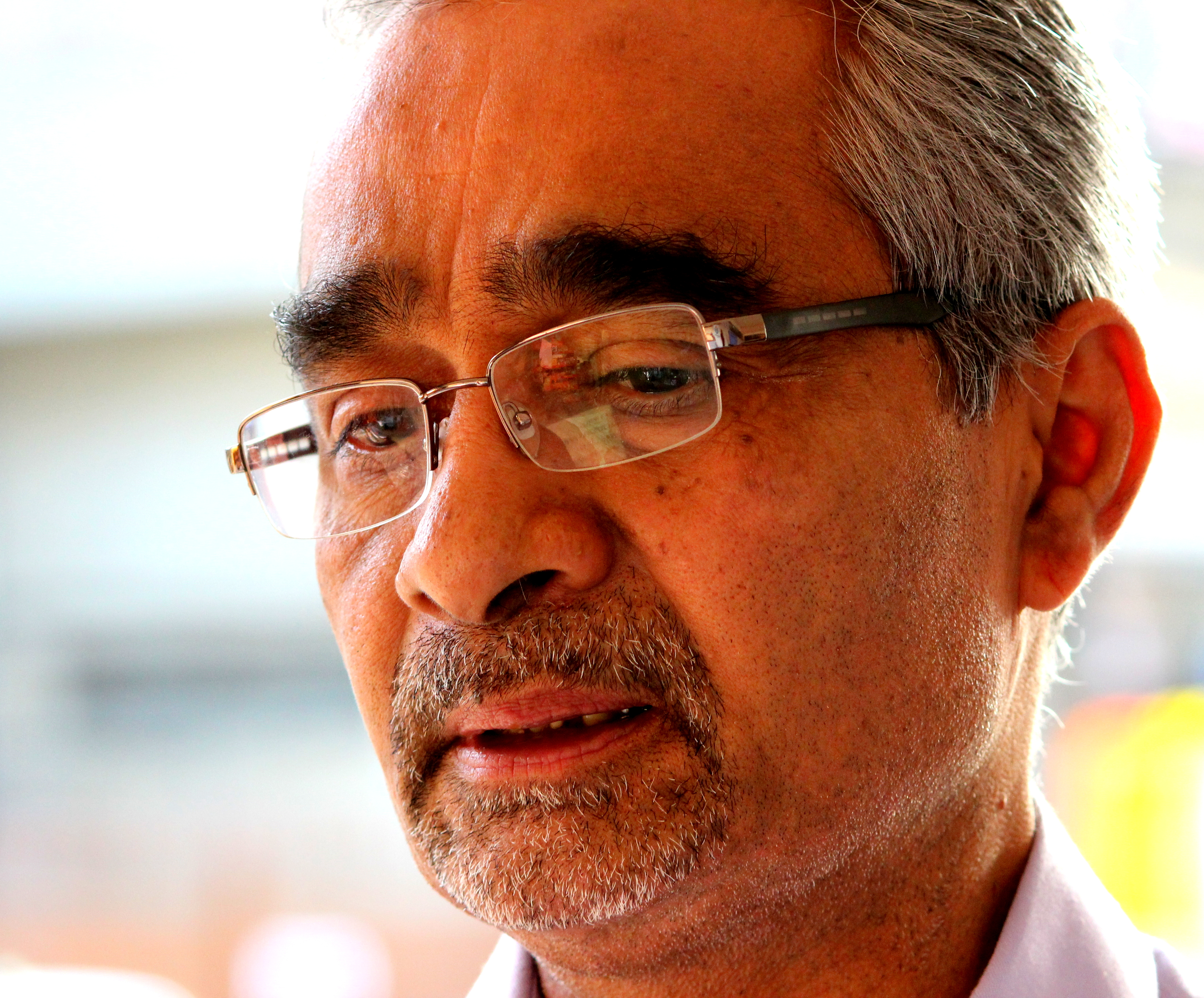
- Born: 22 October 1951 (age 74); Puttur, Puttur taluk, Dakshina Kannada, Karnataka, India
- Occupations: Retired Chief Manager, Syndicate Bank (December 1972 to October 2011); Chief Publicity Manager
- Spouse: Jubeda Bolwar
- Children: Mamthaz, Benazir
- Writing career
- Pen name: Bolwar
- Genres: Short stories, novels, plays, biographies
- Movement: Activist working against radicalization of youth towards religious extremism

Bolwar Mahammad Kunhi (born 1951) is an Indian short story writer, novelist, playwright and scriptwriter. He writes in the Kannada language. He is the first Indian writer to introduce Muslim ethos and culture into creative Kannada prose. He is the only Indian writer conferred with Central Sahitya Academy twice for creative prose. He is the first ever Kannada writer conferred with Bala Sahitya Puraskar by Central Sahitya Academy.

His works have been translated into other Indian languages including English. His work focuses on erasing misconceptions about Islam in India and nurturing a more positive outlook towards Islam. A post-graduate with a gold medal in Kannada literature from Mysore University, Bolwar is a retired chief manager for Syndicate Bank's Bangalore Corporate Office.

== Works ==
https://commons.m.wikimedia.org/wiki/File%3ASignature_of_boluwaru_mohammad_kunhi_kannada_author.jpg

He edited Tattu Chappale Putta Magu, an anthology for children of over 100 poems, and Santammanna, an anthology of illustrated poems. He edited 12 children's plays - Hanneradu MakkaLa Natakagalu.

One of his Kendra Sahitya Akademi awards came for the story of an ordinary Mohandas who became Mahatma Gandhi in his story "Paapu Gandh Bapu Gandhi Aada Kathe". Other than Gorur Ramaswamy Iyengar, Bolwar is the only author to have written about Gandhi for children. It was translated and published in English with the title Gandhi – From Monu To Mahatma (published by Peak Publishing House, London). During the book launch U.R. Ananthamurthy said in praise of Bolwar's book "This is one of the best books on Mahatma Gandhi for children and adults". Ananthamurthy, blurbed, "Bolwar's collection of songs and poems are among the best in contemporary Kannada literature". The book was also developed as a play for children.

His extended short story, "Ondu Thundu Gode," or "A Bit of Wall" treats the explosive Ayodhya theme in a humorous, personal vein. He recounts the story of an old woman, Roti-Phatumma, who wanted to build her own house by acquiring what she believed to be a bit of the wall from the broken pieces of the Babri Masjid. Tongue-in-cheek Bolwar balances serious, comic and poignant aspects.

His epic 1,110-page opus Swathranthada Ota (in English: The run for independence) was released on 18 March 2012 at Ravindra Kalakshetra by Pandit Rajiv Taranath. His book Odiri is the first historical Kannada novel on Muhammad.

He worked as Senate Member in Hampi Kannada University, Kannada Sahitya Academy, Kannada Pustaka Pradhikara. He worked as State president for 'Samudaya' Cultural Organisation, as Convener to Bandaya Sahitya Sangha. He served as editor of Giant (Syndicate Bank's house magazine), Krishiloka (Syndicate Bank's magazine), as member of RDC (Syndicate Bank's Rural Development Institute), Self Employment Training Institute (RUDSETI- Dharmastala). He was the President of Kannada Belesi Balaga and Chitra Samudaya (Film Division).

== Recognition ==
- Central Sahitya Academy(Twice)
- Karnataka Sahitya Academy(Thrice)
- Karnataka Rajyotsava Award
- KATHA award-Delhi
- Bharatiya Bhasha Sasthan Award
- Shivarama Karantha Balavana Award
- Basavaraja Kattimani Award
- MWF Award- Abudhabi.
- Masthi Award
- Parashurama Award
- Thoulava Award
- Karavali Kalasa Award
- Synd Rathana Award
- Vishukumar Award
- ChaDaga Award
- Muslim Sahitya Award
- National and State Awards for contribution to Kannada Films.
