= Karthik Jayaram =

Indian actor (born 1979)

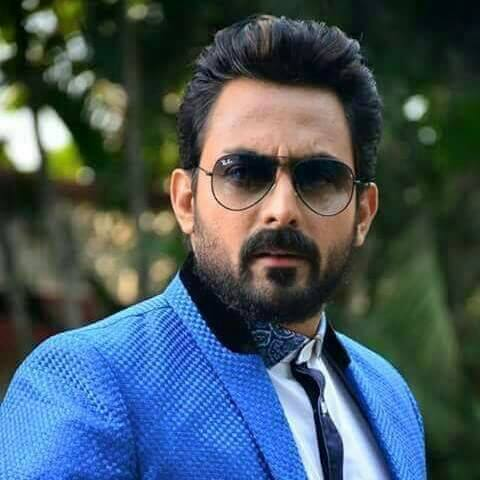
- Born: 01 May 1979 (47 years); Koppa, Karnataka, India
- Other name: JK
- Education: Structural Engineering
- Occupations: Actor; Model
- Years active: 2013–present
- Notable work: JK in Ashwini Nakshatra; Ravana in Siya Ke Ram; Chenna Keshava in Aa Karaala Ratri; Satrajit in Krishnavataram Part 1: The Heart
- Height: 1.76 m (5 ft 9 in)

Karthik Jayaram is an Indian actor, worked in the Kannada, Tamil, Telugu and Hindi industry. He is known for his roles in Kannada serial Ashwini Nakshatra, for Hindi serial Siya Ke Ram as "Ravana" and for the Hindi film Krishnavataram Part 1: The Heart. In 2017, he was second runner-up in the Bigg Boss Kannada 5.

== Early life ==
Kartik was born in Koppa, Chikmagalur, Karnataka. He holds degrees in 'Mechanical and Civil Engineering' from the Bangalore Institute of Technology (BIT) and a Master's degree in Structural Engineering. Before transitioning into acting career, he worked as a civil engineer at Praxair in Dubai.

== Career ==
In 2013, Kartik made his acting debut in the Colors Kannada television series Ashwini Nakshatra, playing the role of superstar "Jay Krishna (JK)". The series was the highest rated during its broadcast. In 2015, he starred as "Ravana" in Star Plus's devotional Hindi series Siya Ke Ram; his performance was highly appreciated. In 2017, he was the second runner-up in the Colors Super's reality show Bigg Boss Kannada 5. His performance in Dayal Padmanabhan's thriller Aa Karaala Ratri was awarded. In 2026, his performance as "Satrajit" in Hardik Gajjar's Hindi film directorial debut Krishnavataram Part 1: The Heart was critically acclaimed.

== Filmography ==
=== Television ===
Year	Title	Role	Language(s)	Notes	Ref
2013	Ashwini Nakshatra	Jay Krishna "JK"	Kannada	Main Lead	
2013	Agnisakshi	Superstar JK	Kannada	Guest	
2015	Siya Ke Ram	Ravana	Hindi	Voiced: Manoj Pandey	
2020	Naagini 2	Aadishesha	Kannada	Special role: Ep-1	
2022	Ali Baba: Dastaan-E-Kabul	Iblis	Hindi	Main Antagonist	

=== Reality show ===
Year	Title	Role	Language(s)	Notes	Ref
2017	Bigg Boss Kannada 5	Contestant	Kannada	2nd Runner-up	

=== Films ===
Year	Title	Role	Language(s)	Notes	Ref
2011	Kempe Gowda	Vaikunta	Kannada		
2011	Vishnuvardhana	Dr. Surya Prakash	Kannada		
2011	Jarasandha	Ravi Poojary	Kannada		
2013	Varadanayaka	Siddu	Kannada		
2013	Padhe Padhe	Himself	Kannada	Guest appearance	
2014	Just Love	Surya	Kannada		
2015	Chandrika	Arjun	Telugu-Kannada	Bilingual	
2015	Bengaluru 560023	Karthik	Kannada		
2015	Care of Footpath 2	Inspector Karthik	Kannada	Credited as Jaya Karthik	
2016	Sa	Zakir Hussain	Kannada		
2017	Vismaya	Christopher	Kannada		
2018	Kuchiku Kuchiku	Siddharth	Kannada		
2018	Aa Karaala Ratri	Chenna Keshava/Subbu	Kannada		
2018	May 1st	Ravaana	Kannada	Also as scriptwriter	
2018	Puta 109	Inspector JK	Kannada		
2020	O Pushpa I Hate Tears	Adhitya	Hindi		
2021	Maaligai	Vishnu / Vishnuvardhan	Tamil		
2023	Iravan	Mithun Chakravarthy	Kannada		
2026	Krishnavataram Part 1: The Heart (Hridayam)	Satrajit	Hindi		

== Awards and nominations ==
Year	Award	Category	Work	Status	Ref.
2018	South Indian International Movie Awards	Best Actor in a Supporting Role: Kannada	Aa Karaala Ratri	Nominated	
