= Naagini =

Indian television series

- Genre: Fantasy
- Directed by: Hayavadana
- Starring: Deepika Das; Deekshith Shetty; Ashalatha
- Country of origin: India
- Original language: Kannada
- No. of episodes: 1,060

Production
- Producer: Hayavadana
- Camera setup: Multi-camera
- Running time: 22 minutes

Original release
- Network: Zee Kannada
- Release: 8 February 2016 – 7 February 2020

Related
- Naagini 2

Naagini (transl. The Female Serpent) is a 2016 Indian Kannada-language supernatural fantasy television series which aired on Zee Kannada. The series, a remake of the Hindi series Naaginn, was directed by Hayavadana. The series premiered on 8 February 2016. Due to its success, a sequel was released on 17 February 2020.

== Summary ==
The series follows the story of Ichchadhari Naagini Amrutha (Deepika Das), a serpent princess seeking revenge for the murder of her parents, King Naagaraja (Master Sanjay) and Queen Nagarani (Jayashree Raj). Her parents were killed by Rudra (Arjun Ramesh), his brother Vishnu, and their associates, who wanted to obtain the powerful Naagamani, a sacred serpent gem. The king’s body and the secret surrounding the Naagamani remain under Vishnu’s control.

Ten years later, following her aunt’s advice, Amrutha travels to the Durgapura Shiva temple with her deceased mother. She is adopted by Vikram and Saroja and meets Arjun (Dheekshith Shetty), Vishnu’s adopted son, who falls in love with her. With the help of Shesha, the serpent who becomes her friend, Amrutha discovers that Rudra, Vishnu, and their associates were responsible for her parents’ deaths. She begins taking revenge on the murderers, killing Raju and later Prakash. Amrutha eventually marries Arjun, but during the wedding ceremony, Shesha is killed by Rudra, Vishnu, and Baba. Lord Karthikeya later restores Shesha’s life because of his help to Amrutha. Amrutha subsequently kills Rudra at the Garuda temple.

A major turning point in the story is the revelation surrounding Triveni, who is initially presented as the mother of Rudra and Vishnu. She is eventually exposed as an antagonist with a hidden past. Her real name is Damayanthi, and she is not their biological mother. Like Amrutha, she belongs to the Naga clan, but her desire to obtain the Naagamani puts her in direct conflict with Amrutha. The sacred gem is hidden inside a Shivalingam created at Takshaka Vana by Gurudeva. Triveni is also revealed to have killed one of Arjun’s relatives. Arjun’s true name is Partha, a secret known only to Gurudeva.

The rivalry between Amrutha and Triveni becomes one of the central conflicts of the series. While Amrutha fights to protect the Naagamani and those she loves, Triveni pursues her own ambitions and repeatedly plots against her. Triveni supports Mayuri in her schemes involving Arjun and Amrutha, attempting to create conflict and separate them. Their confrontations involve deception, betrayal, supernatural powers, and a struggle for control of the Naagamani. Meanwhile, Shesha’s later betrayal of Amrutha over Arjun adds another layer of tension to the story. The series combines revenge, romance, family secrets, serpent mythology, and the continuing battle between Amrutha and Triveni.

=== Goraknath ===
A professor and researcher tries to capture Naagini for revenge. He is threatened by her when he is following her in snake form to know Naagamani. He goes to a tantrik to gain special powers. He sends his goons to capture snakes. Gurudev decides to give life to King Nagaraj for helping Amrutha. Gurudeva inserts his soul into King Maharaja's body and gives life back to King Naagaraj.

Naagini goes to the forest, sees them and tries to free the snakes. She takes the form of a snake and hides in boxes in their vehicles, to know the truth. Goraknath said the snakes would be shipped to Andaman because he has go to Andaman. Accidentally Amrutha takes Naagini into Andaman. Arjun unsuccessfully searches for Amrutha, then finally goes to Andaman, meets his friend Nanda to get help from him, and they find Amrutha.

Goraknath captures Naagini and imprisons her. Arjun rescues her. Amrutha and Arjun run from Gora's place. Gora targets Arjun to capture Naagini. While Arjun is driving his car, Gora uses his power to make Arjun unconscious, and he crashes. Naagaraja takes him to the Ashram for treatment. Triveni and Amritha are informed about the accident. Later the family is informed about the accident and take him to the hospital. Poornachandra Shastri advises them to make a yajnyaa pooja to save him.

Shastriji starts the pooja and advises Amrutha that she can bring special sanjeevini mulika which can save him. Amrutha goes to the mountain, assisted by Nagaraja. He takes sanjivini and saves Arjun. Later, Goraknath is defeated by Bhaira and Baba.

=== Rudra ===
Rudra is alive. Earlier, Amrutha killed him by Lord Kaali's power. He is later saved by the Naagamani power. Triveni asks Jyotishi about Rudra. They advise that Rudra was resurrected by his father, Jathaka. Rudra comes to their family, but he acts like a child, without memory. Vishnu goes to Bhairava Baba to know the truthwho reveals that Rudra was saved by the Naagamani power.

Rudra gets the Naagamani. He tries to kill Amrutha by taking several forms, but Naagini is helped by Poornachandra Shastri to save him. Bhairava knows the Naagamani is in Rudra's hand and tries to take it. Rudra imprisons Vishnu and hides him. Triveni and her family are bothered by Vishnu's absence. Rudra sends a man and he says that Arjun and Amrutha have to go to Vishnupura to save Vishnu.

=== Triveni (Damayanti) ===
Triveni, whose real name is Damayanti, is the head of the family and belongs to the Naaga clan. Although she is initially presented as the mother of Rudra and Vishnu, she is not their biological mother. She adopts Arjun as her son and secretly knows the truth about his extraordinary identity: he is a Naagayoda, a powerful being possessing both divine and Naaga powers.

Arjun was born with a unique combination of divine and serpent powers and is destined to protect the sacred Naagamani. Knowing his true identity, Triveni brings him into her family and keeps his origins a secret. Her Naaga Guru reveals that when Arjun reaches the age of 25, he will transform into a Naagayoda, also known as a powerful Mahanaga.

Triveni's knowledge of Arjun's identity adds another dimension to her complicated character. Although she raises him as her son, her pursuit of the Naagamani and her rivalry with Amrutha create conflicts that affect Arjun's destiny and relationships.

Important episodes featuring Arjun as a Naagayoda:

- Kanishka's attack: When Kanishka imprisons Amrutha, Arjun transforms into a Naagayoda and uses his extraordinary powers to protect her from Kanishka.
- Goraknath's episodes in Andaman: Arjun becomes a Naagayoda and fights the goons guarding Amrutha, helping her escape from the island.

These events reveal Arjun's supernatural strength and his destined role in protecting Amrutha and the Naagamani, while Triveni's secret knowledge connects her closely to the larger conflict between the Naaga characters.

=== Vishnupura and Garuda Vamsha ===
A village named Vishnupura worships Garuda. The Shatrughna of the village, from Garudavamsha, plans to reopen the Garuda Temple. The pujari decide to make mahapooja.

Following Rudra's plan, Arjun and Amrutha go to perform pooja in Vishnupura. The village Shatrughna started performing yajnya and send his sister Sowparnika to make digbandhana. Arjun and Amrutha arrive, but she does not welcome them. Arjun saves her when her rival tries to attack her to disturb the pooja. She gives them permission to enter the village and takes them to their place. Arjun and Amrutha approach the yajnya and disturb it and Shatrughna tries to punish them. Sowparnika said that they saved her from her rival's attack pooja. Arjun and Amrutha stay in Shatrughna's home. Rudra comes to Vishnupura and convinces Shatrughna that Amrutha is Naagini.

The Shatrughna and Rudra use Arjun to capture Amrutha. Amrutha is assisted by Sowparnika to save Arjun. Triveni is tense about what's happening in Vishnupura. He visits there and sees that Rudra is normal. He says "he has acted that way to kill his enemy". Triveni tries to convince him that Arjun is not naaga. After Vishnu Bhairava Baba and Shastriji, Shastri acts as enemy and tries to help Amrutha and Arjun.

Bhairava Baba and Rudra capture Amrutha and try to kill her. Arjun takes Naga form to rescue Amrutha and swallows Nagamani. Amrutha defeats Bhairava and Rudra. Finally Vishnu returns with Arjun's help.

Arjun starts to get signs of naaga when he is angered. Arjun tries to punish and warn Vishnu for killing naagas. Vishnu learns of this and goes to Bhairava to save him. He advises him to give Arjun to Bali pooja in order to save him. Vishnu tries to kill Arjun before Arjun kills him. He sends him Kaalingapura. When Vishnu tries, he accidentally sees his naaga form. Rudra goes there and takes him home.

Vishnu tells Rudra of the event, but Rudra did not believe him. Arjun takes naga form and chases Vishnu. Vishnu runs out to save a life. Rudra approaches Vishnu. The duo is killed by Arjun's naaga form. Bhairava gives them their lives back. Vishnu and Rudra tell Bhairava of the incident, but he does not believe it. Once Bhairva tests Arjuna in their home and concludes that Arjun is naga and has Naagamani. Bhairva tries to take Nagamani from him but defeated by Arjun.

Bhairva Baba concludes and tells Vishnu and Rudra that it is impossible for them but a rival of him would kill him. That rival is an Apsara named Urmila, aspiring to take Naagamani from Arjun. They killed Shesha also by tricking her in Amrutha form.

=== Entry of Apsara ===
Amrutha and Arjun go on a trip, but a mystical old apsara takes them to an old temple. Amrutha knows Shesha's death by the trio of Vishnu, Rudra and Bhairava, chases them, kills Vishnu and Rudra, and accidentally takes them in Naga Roopa's body. Bhairav domslsEraser follows and asks for his advice. His guru said that he will defeat erasers with a weapon from his guru's atma Shakti. He would use it twice. Bhairava first uses the weapon when she released Vishnu and Rudra. The second time, she loses her sight. Bhairava tells the duo that Naagini has lost her sight, if she does not have treatment for her sight, she will give up her life. Arjun arrives and takes Amrutha home. The duo try to say that Amrutha is Naagini, but Arjun saves her.

Then, eraser controls Amrutha's mind and makes her say she needs ayurveda treatment. Eraser plans to kill Arjun and sends him to a village by disguising as an astrologer, saying he has to visit a village named Pushpagiri for Amrutha's treatment. There Amrutha starts to possess Arjun. Triveni and Urvashi try to test to reveal her as Naagini. Arjun becomes possessed by her.

In Arjun's absence, Amrutha's true identity is revealed to everyone and Amrutha is thrown from the home. When Arjun arrives, he is told she is missing. He tries to find Amrutha. Meanwhile, Triveni takes the form of Gudi, a girl whom the family members wish to marry Arjun to turn him back to human.

Amrutha blesses Vaishnavi and Kumar to get a child. Dakshayani, Kumar's mother, gets to know that Amrutha is Naagini. She instructs Amrutha to perform Shiv-Parvati Pooja to save Arjun from Urmila.

When celebrating Naagarpanchami, Arjun meets Amrutha and she decides to take him to Naagloka, but her plan is foiled and she loses Arjun. Amrutha begins the pooja by begging for money. Triveni is captured by Bhairava and becomes his companion. Gudi plans to take Arjun to Amrutha .

Bhairava suddenly tells the family members to marry Arjuna and Triveni. Shastri escapes with Arjun. He takes Arjun to the forest to meet Amrutha. He leaves Arjun with Amrutha. Bhairava sends Kanishka to get the Naagmani where he is killed by Amrutha. On Neela Amavasya, the Neeli Nagas wrapped on Arjun where Naagmani was hidden. Later Amrutha confirms Naagmani's location.

=== Naagini Antima Adhyaya ===
Amrutha learns that Nagamani is inside Arjun. As per Shastri's instruction Amrutha and Arjun unite as snakes in front of Shivalinga and the Nagamani inside Arjun comes out and goes on top of Shivalinga. Shastry says to Hema that a valuable object must be collected and she must keep it with her for a few days. Hema arrives and takes Naagmani and escapes. Amrutha comes back as human and identifies that Naagmani is missing. Then she asks Shastry about it. Shastry says that it is with Hema. Amrutha demands Hema for Naagmani, but Hema restricts her by giving Naagmani and says that the condition was that Amrutha should give Arjun to Hema and he should marry Triveni. Then she will give Naagmani to her. Amrutha agrees to that and brings Arjun home. Hema begs Amrutha that, she should leave the house by leaving Arjun and Arjun should come to know that she is Naagini. As per Hema's instructions, Amrutha tries to kill Mani as a Naagini. Arjun learns that Amrutha is Naagini so he throws Amrutha out.

Triveni reveals to Amrutha and says that she is a Naagini, not a ghost. And that she came on earth to marry Arjun. Amrutha challenges her that she take Arjun to Naaglok for Vasuki Dynasty, not for Urmila's Takshaka Dynasty.

Arjun's family decides to marry Arjun with Urmila and takes them to temple where marry. But Amrutha had disguised herself as Urmila. Amrutha arrests Urmila and hands her to Shastry. Shastry makes Urmila a statue and then Amrutha disguises as Urmila and marries Arjun.

Arjun is not happy and badly needs Amrutha whether she is Naagini or human. Hema and Amrutha (disguised as Urmila) goes to Ashrama. Shastry tells Hema to hand Naagmani to Urmila (Amrutha) as he know that Urmila is Amrutha. So Hema gives the box of Naagmani to Amrutha, but it was Bhairava Baba, who appeared to be Amrutha. Hema learns that she has lost Naagmani. Amrutha asks Shastry about this Shastry says that she should kill one of her enemies.

=== Rebirth of Arjun ===
Arjun is reborn as Ajanubhava (an infectious snake). He is born as a human. His grandmother says he was an Ajanubhava. He does not believe in supernatural powers. He ignores his grandmother. Agrahara, a Bhairava, puts a Nagabhandhana. It was proved he was a snake. Bhairava tortures Ajanubhava and his father-in-law goes to Puttahamsa. A Mujyaala tells Vishnu not to travel to Naagara Devasthana. Vishnu and Rudra push Mujyaala and enter Naagara Devasthana. Ajanubhava is converted into naagayodha and save Naagara Devasthana. He defeats Vishnu and Rudra.

=== Defeat of Thakshaka ===
Bhairava converts the spirit of Naagayodha. Thakshaka helps Amrutha but he does not get Vajrahana. Bhairava decides to get a poisonous snake. Thakshaka gets angry and kills a snake. Bhairava is not able to defeat Thakshaka. He remembers that in the past he had challenged Thakshaka that he would become more powerful than him. Bhairava stands against Thakshaka but is defeated. Naagayodha, an evil spirit, later defeats Thakshaka.

== Cast ==
=== Main ===
- Deepika Das as
  - an Ichchadhari Naagin
  - Shesha; Amrutha Look alike Naagin, Comes for Heling Amrutha
- Dheekshith Shetty as
  - Arjun, husband of Amrutha
  - Partha, Nagayodha protector of Nagamani
- Ashalatha as Triveni or Damayanti, the family's head
- Shilpa Ravi as Mayuri
- Karishma Amin as Shesha
- BK Raghavendra
- Ambarish Sarangi
  - as Vishnu, Arjun's father
- Arjun Ramesh
- Arun
  - as Rudra, Vishnu's brother
- Harini Shreekanth as Hemavathi (Hema), Arjun's mother
- Ashalatha as Triveni or Damayanti, the family's head
- Cheluvaraj
- Suryakiran
  - as Bhairava baba, a sorcerer
- Master Sanjay as King Naagaraja
- Jayashree Raj as Queen Naagarani
- Ila Vitla as Sowparnika, Shatrughna's sister
- Kempegowda as Nanda, Arjun's friend
- Gauthami Jayaramu as Urmila

=== Characters ===
- Amruta: She is an Ichadaari Naagini and the daughter of the king and queen of Naaglok. Also, the adoptive daughter Vikram and Saroja.
- Shesha: She is an Ichchadaari Naagini made by Gurudev for helping Amrutha. She looks exactly like Amrutha. A big mole on her neck distinguishes her. She is the best friend of Amrutha. .
- Arjun: Arjun is the husband of Amrutha. He is an adopted son of Vishnu and Hema and the son of an unknown deceased father and mother Yasodha. His real name is Partha and his real identity is unknown.
- Triveni: She was the adopted mother of Vishnu and Rudra. Her identity is unknown. She brings Arjun and returns to Vishnu. Her real name was Damayanthi.
- Raju: He is the first murderer of King and Queen of Naaglok.
- Prakash: He is the second murderer of King and Queen of Naaglok.
- Rudra: He is the third and main murderer of King and Queen of Naaglok and the first murderer of Shesha. He was the adopted son of Triveni.
- Bairava Baba: He is the second murderer of Shesha and motivated all to steal Naagmani. He is the guru of Vishnu and Rudra. He is a greedy sorcerer.
- Vishnu: He is the adopted son of Triveni and the brother of Rudra. He is the third murderer of Shesha. He is greedy to get the Naagmani.
- Karan: He is the step-brother of Arjun and he is jealous of Naagmani.
- Chitra: She is the wife of Karan.
- Gurudev: He is a devotee of Lord Parameshwara.
- Mayuri: Mayuri is a modern girl who is in love with Arjun. But she also craves his family's wealth.
- Harsha: Harsha is Mayuri's friend and he lies to and deceives girls.
- Hemavathi: She is called Hema for short and is the wife of Vishnu and stepmother of Arjun. She is a loving and care-taking woman.
- Vani: Vani is the wife of Rudra. She is also a loving and care-taking woman.

== Adaptations ==
Language	Title	Original release	Network (s)	Last aired	Notes
Hindi	Naaginn – Waadon Ki Agnipariksha नागीन – वादों की अग्निपरीक्षा	5 October 2007	Zee TV	11 April 2009	Original
Kannada	Naagini ನಾಗಿಣಿ	8 February 2016	Zee Kannada	7 February 2020	Remake
Marathi	Icchadhari Naagin इच्छाधारी नागीण	Upcoming	Zee Marathi	TBA	Remake
Bengali	Icchadhari Naagkonya ইচ্ছাধারী নাগাকোন্ডা	Upcoming	Zee Bangla	TBA	Remake

=== Dubbed versions ===
Language	Title	Original release	Network (s)	Last aired
Hindi	Naagkanya	17 October 2016	Zee Anmol	—N/a
Tamil	Naga Rani	25 April 2016	Zee Tamil	27 April 2018
Bhojpuri	Naag Kanya	25 January 2019	Big Ganga	30 September 2018
Malayalam	Naagam	12 June 2023	Zee Keralam	26 August 2023
