= Bigg Boss OTT (Kannada) =

Indian Kannada-language digital reality series

- Presented by: Sudeep
- Country of origin: India
- Original language: Kannada
- No. of seasons: 1

Production
- Production location: Bengaluru
- Camera setup: Multi-camera
- Running time: 24 hours (Live); 1hr episode
- Production company: Endemol Shine India

Original release
- Network: Voot
- Release: 6 August 2022

Bigg Boss: OTT (or Bigg Boss OTT Kannada) is a spin-off Indian Kannada-language reality digital series of the show Bigg Boss that airs exclusively on Viacom 18's streaming service platform Voot. The digital edition hosted by Sudeep and the show premiered its first and only season on 6 August 2022.

== Concept ==
As with the television series, the group of contestants referred to as Housemates are enclosed in the Bigg Boss House under constant surveillance of cameras and microphones. The winner of Bigg Boss OTT will receive ₹5 lakh and the "OTT edition"

The show is a 24/7 non stop show and also it have 1 hour daily episode on Voot like the original edition.

== Development ==
The spin-off edition was officially announced on 22 July 2022, Voot unveiled a poster and teaser with Sudeep as the host of this digital exclusive season.

=== Broadcasts ===
There was no television coverage for this edition; instead, it would be completely streamed online at Voot for 24×7 coverage.

=== House ===
The location for the house set to remain at Innovative Film City, Bengaluru like how it did for the original series. The house contains a living area, One large bedroom, kitchen, garden, bathroom, store room, smoking room and jail (for punishment purposes only). The house also contains a confession room where contestants speak private matters to Bigg Boss. Bigg Boss OTT Kannada season 1

== Production ==
Teaser
On 22 July 2022, Voot un eviled a poster with Sudeep as the host of digital exclusive season. On 23 July, Voot unevlied a promo with Sudeep hosting a first season of Bigg Boss OTT Kannada.

Broadcast
Apart from usual hour-long episode, viewers will also have access to the direct 24x7 camera footage. The episodes will be telecasted through 24 Hours Live Channel and episodes will premiere on 7pm for paid subscription of Voot Select, the it will be shown for free next morning at 9 am on Voot.

House
The house consists of a Patio, Living Room, Kitchen, Bathroom, Bedroom, Garden Area, Confession Room, Dining Table, Swimming Pool.

Bigg Boss Kannada 9
As per the show's concept, Champions Saniya Iyer, Aaryavardhan Guruji, Rakesh Adiga and Top performer Roopesh Shetty were qualified to participate in Bigg Boss Kannada 9. Iyer was evicted on Day 42 and Guruji on Day 93. Later Adiga and Shetty made it into finale of Bigg Boss Kannada 9 by living in for 14 weeks, covering more hardship journey than OTT. Shetty and Adiga emerged as Winner and 1st Runner-up of Season 9 respectively.

== Housemates status ==
Sr.	Housemates	Day Entered	Day Exited	Housemates Status
1	Roopesh	Day 1	Day 42	Top Performer
2	Rakesh	Day 1	Day 42	Champion
3	Saanya	Day 1	Day 42	Champion
4	Aryavardhan	Day 1	Day 42	Champion
5	Sonu	Day 1	Day 42	Evicted
6	Somanna	Day 1	Day 42	Evicted
7	Jashwanth	Day 1	Day 42	Evicted
8	Jayashree	Day 1	Day 42	Evicted
9	Nandini	Day 1	Day 35	Evicted
10	Chythrra	Day 1	Day 28	Evicted
11	Akshata	Day 1	Day 28	Evicted
12	Uday	Day 1	Day 21	Evicted
13	Spoorthi	Day 1	Day 14	Evicted
14	Arjun	Day 1	Day 13	Walked
15	Kiran	Day 1	Day 7	Evicted
16	Lokesh	Day 1	Day 6	Walked

== Housemates ==
- Aryavardhan Guruji:- Popular astrologer, numerologist and often makes his appearance on television in special shows related to astrology and numerology. He is one of the rarest astrologers who get trolled often.
- Sonu Srinivas Gowda:- A digital media sensation.
- Saanya Iyer:- Sanya shot to fame as a child artist with the mega show Puttagowri Maduve, where she essayed the character of Junior Gowri.
- Somanna Machimada:- a news reporter by profession, shot to fame with his special celebrity interviews. He has been a media person for a long time now. His journey to a successful reporter and a news presenter is worth a mention.
- Spoorthi Gowda:- Last seen on Kannada television with daily soap Seetha Vallaba, Spoorthi has been in the industry for a long time now. She has also been a part of the Telugu television industry.
- Arjun Ramesh:- The actor, who is set to make his silver screen debut, is close to the telly viewers as 'Lord Shiva'. Arjun essayed the role of Lord Shiva in the mythological series Mahakaali. He even acted in supernatural fiction Naagini.
- Roopesh Shetty:- This multi-talented youngster has acted in Kannada, Tulu, and Konkani movies. The Radio Jockey and model is from Mangalore.
- Akshatha Kuki:- This young talent from Dandeli is indeed known for her chirpy nature. She has also been a model in her career and aspires to become a full-fledged actress.
- Rakesh Adiga:- A passionate actor and rapper, Rakesh got his first break with his debut Kannada film Jhhosh in the year 2009. The film went on to become one of the top grossers of that year and earned him good recognition. Ever since then, he has featured in quite some Kannada movies.
- Chythrra Halikere:- Chaitra was recently in the news when she lodged an FIR against her husband and father-in-law. The actress shot to fame with her debut movie 'Kushi'. However, she was away from the limelight for a long time and made her small screen comeback with the daily soap Marali Manasaagide.
- Kiran Yogeshwar - A model, dancer, travel, enthusiast, and yoga instructor, Kiran is quite a bundle of talent. Hailing from Rajasthan, Kiran's journey to becoming a successful independent woman is worth a mention.
- Jayashree Aradhaya - She is proud independent entrepreneur. Not many know that Jayashree Aradhya is the granddaughter of late actress Marimuthu from Upendra's movie ‘A’.
- Lokesh:- Comedy Khiladigalu fame Lokesh is not new to Kannada viewers. The actor-comedian steals the show every time he makes an appearance. After Comedy Khiladigalu, Lokesh went on to feature in quite some reality shows.
- Jashwanth and Nandini :- After winning the Hindi TV reality show Roadies, Jashwanth and Nandu are now set to enter Bigg Boss Kannada OTT. The too-much-in-love couple is looking forward to building their identity in their homeland.
- Uday Surya:- Television actor

== Nominations table ==
	Week 1	Week 2	Week 3	Week 4	Week 5	Week 6	Week 7	Week 8	Week 9	Week 10	
House Captain	No captaincy and captaincy Nominees									No; Captain	
Captain's Nominations	No captaincy and captaincy Nominees									No; Captain	
Boss of the week										No; Captain	
Boss' Nomination										No; Captain	
Vote to:	Evict	Task	Evict							WIN	
Thanuja		𝘕𝘰𝘵 𝘌𝘭𝘪𝘨𝘪𝘣𝘭𝘦								Nominated	WINNER (Day 70)
Ramu		𝘚𝘢𝘧𝘦								Nominated	1ST RUNNER (Day 70)
Srija		𝘕𝘰𝘵 𝘌𝘭𝘪𝘨𝘪𝘣𝘭𝘦								Nominated	2𝙉𝘿 𝙍𝙐𝙉𝙉𝙀𝙍 (Day 42)
		𝘕𝘰𝘵 𝘌𝘭𝘪𝘨𝘪𝘣𝘭𝘦								Nominated	Champion (Day 42)
										No; Nominations	Evicted (Day 42)
										No; Nominations	Evicted (Day 42)
										No; Nominations	Evicted (Day 42)
		𝘕𝘰𝘵 𝘌𝘭𝘪𝘨𝘪𝘣𝘭𝘦								No; Nominations	Evicted (Day 42)
										Evicted (Day 35)	
		𝘕𝘰𝘵 𝘌𝘭𝘪𝘨𝘪𝘣𝘭𝘦			Evicted (Day 28)						
					Evicted (Day 28)						
		Not eligible		Evicted (Day 21)							
			Evicted (Day 14)								
			Walked (Day 13)								
		Evicted (Day 7)									
		Walked (Day 6)									
Notes											
Against Public Vote	Ayesha Pavan Ramu									Thanuja Ramu Srija Divya Ramya	
Walked											
Evicted	Pavan										
Evicted	Pavan										Srija
Evicted	Pavan										Ramu
Evicted	Pavan										Thanuja

indicates that the Housemate was directly nominated for eviction.
indicates that the Housemate was immune prior to nominations.
indicates the contestant has been evicted.
indicates the contestant walked out due to emergency.
indicates the contestant has been ejected.
indicates the house captain.
