= Veena Sundar =

Indian actress

- Born: Karnataka, India
- Occupation: Actress
- Years active: 1995 - present
- Spouse: Sundar Veena
- Children: 2

Veena Sundar is an Indian actress who appears in Kannada films and soaps. For her performance in the movie Aa Karaala Ratri, she won Karnataka State Film Award for Best Supporting Actress in 2018.

== Personal life ==
Veena married to actor Sundar. The couple have a daughter and son.

== Career ==
Veena has appeared in more than 60 Kannada movies, playing mostly supporting roles.

== Awards ==
- 2018 - Karnataka State Film Award for Best Supporting Actress - Aa Karaala Ratri
- 2018 - Filmfare Award - Best Actress in Supporting Role - Nominated - Kaafi Thota

== Selected filmography ==
- Mr. Painter (2009)
- Aptharakshaka (2010)
- Olave Mandara (2011) - Nanji
- Puttakkana Highway (2011)
- Adyaksha (2014)
- Noorondu Nenapu (2017)
- Kaafi Thota (2017)
- Aa Karaala Ratri (2018)
- Asura Samhara (2020)
- Totapuri: Chapter 1 (2021)
- Yuvarathnaa (2021)
- Man of the Match (2022)

== See also ==
- Karnataka State Film Award for Best Supporting Actress
