= Thrayambakam =

2019 film

- Directed by: Dayal Padmanabhan
- Written by: Dayal Padmanabhan
- Produced by: Sphurti Shirashyad; Jeevotham Bhat
- Starring: Raghavendra Rajkumar; Anupama Gowda; RJ Rohith
- Cinematography: Rakesh B.
- Edited by: Sunil Kashyap
- Music by: R. S. Ganesh Narayanan
- Production company: Future Entertainment Films
- Release date: 19 April 2019
- Country: India
- Language: Kannada

Thrayambakam is a 2019 Indian Kannada-language psychological thriller directed by Dayal Padmanabhan and starring Raghavendra Rajkumar, Anupama Gowda, and RJ Rohith. The film is about a father and a daughter.

== Cast ==
- Raghavendra Rajkumar as Shiva Rudriah
- Anupama Gowda as Namana
- RJ Rohith
- Vijayalakshmi Singh
- Prashanth Natana

== Production ==
The film began shooting in late 2019 and started its dubbing stages in January 2019.

== Soundtrack ==
The songs are composed by R. S. Ganesh Narayanan. The acapella song "Moda Modalu" was released in early 2019 and is considered the first acapella song in the Kannada film industry.

No.	Title	Singer(s)	Length
1.	"Shivoham"	Hemanth Kumar	4:02
2.	"Moda Modalu"	Salim Javeed, Shankar Narayanswamy, Prabhu Swami, Divya Kuppuswamy, Shruthi Prashanth	4:03
3.	"Angaili Ninneya"	Mehboob Saab, Sangeeta Kati	4:15
4.	"Oolelle Oolelle"	Santhosh Venky and Anuradha Bhat	3:03
Total length:			15:18

== Reception ==
The Times of India gave the film a rating of two-and-a-half out of five stars and stated that "Thryambakam is an earnest effort, but it could have been trimmed in the first half". The Bangalore Mirror gave the film a rating of two out of five stars and wrote that "Tryambakam does not offer much of a cinematic experience".
