= Raja Rani (Kannada TV series) =

Kannada language TV soap opera

- Genre: Dance, Compatibility, Romance
- Created by: Prakash Gopalakrishnan
- Directed by: Prakash Gopalakrishnan
- Presented by: Anupama Gowda
- Judges: Srujan Lokesh; Tara (Kannada actress); Aditi Prabhudeva
- Theme music composer: Karthik Sharma
- Opening theme: Raja Rani ye Raja Rani
- Country of origin: India
- Original language: Kannada
- No. of seasons: 3

Production
- Production location: Bengaluru
- Cinematography: Arun Bramha
- Camera setup: Multi-camera
- Running time: 60-75 minutes
- Production company: Viacom 18

Original release
- Network: Colors Kannada
- Release: 10 July 2021

Related
- Majaa Talkies Season 3

Raja Rani (ರಾಜ ರಾಣಿ) is a Kannada couple reality show aired on Colors Kannada and streamed on Voot. It features celebrity couples as contestants who are competing for the title Raja Rani. The judges of the show are Srujan Lokesh and Tara. The show is hosted by Anupama Gowda. The show premiered on 10 July 2021.

== Production ==
A celebrity couple gameshow like none other, featuring 12 awesome duos competing for the title of Raja Rani! Each week brings unique themed tasks and challenges where the couples will not just have to win the game but also win hearts with their compatibility and entertaining ability. The surviving duo will be crowned Raja Rani. The show is produced by Pixel Pictures Private Limited.

== Contestants ==
A total of 12 celebrity couples, mostly TV actors are part of the show.

#	Celebrity	Partner
1 (Winner)	Neha Gowda	Chandan
2 (Runner Up)	Ishitha Varsha	Murugananda
3 (Ist Runner Up)	Chandan Shetty	Niveditha Gowda
4 (2nd Runner Up)	Harini	Sreekanth
5 (Finalist)	Roopa	Prashanth
6 (Finalist)	Pavan	Suman
7	Sameeer Acharya	Shravani
8	Sujay Shastry	Sinchana
9	Ayyappa	Anu Poovamma
10	Raju Talikote	Prema & Prema
11	Sowmya	Praveen
12	Deepika	Akarsh

== Weekly summary ==
Week No.	Episode No.	Original Air Date	Couple Evicted Rank	Theme	Raja Rani Of The Week
1 Grand Premiere	1; 2	10 July 2021; 11 July 2021	—N/a	Introduction	—N/a
1 Grand Premiere	Celebrity couples were introduced with couple performances.				
2	3; 4	17 July 2021; 18 July 2021	—N/a	Manasugala Mathu Madhura	Raju Talikote, Prema & Prema
2	The theme did induce some chemistry between the couples.				
3	5; 6	25 January 2014; 26 January 2014	—N/a	Romantic Cookery Round	Neha Gowda & Chandan
3	Couples prepare tasty, finger-licking dishes blended with romance with a pinch of twist.				
4	7; 8	31 August 2021; 1 August 2021	Deepika & Akarsh; Rank 12	Romantic Entertainment Round	Raju Talikote, Prema & Prema
4	N C Aiyappa and Anu Aiyappa spellbind the judges with their dance.; Raju gets an unexpected gift from the judges.				
5	9; 10	14 August 2021; 15 August 2021	Sowmya & Praveen; Rank 11	Roles Reverse Round	Ishitavarsha & Murugananda
5	Roles are reversed of husband and wife and the contestants perform tasks.				
6	11; 12	21 August 2021; 22 August 2021	—N/a	Madhuve Sambramha	—N/a
6	Srujan's wife Greeshma was invited as a guest for the special episode week.; All contestants cherish their marriage moments.				
7	13; 14	28 August 2021; 29 August 2021	—N/a	Madhuve Sambrhama Continued	Aiyappa & Anu
7	Gurukiran and his wife Pallavi were invited as guests for the special episode; Contestants perform certain tasks related to marriage.				
8	15; 16 17	4 September 2021; 5 September 2021 10 September 2021	—N/a	Olavina Udugore Round	Pavan and Suman
8	Cinematographer Venu, Tara's husband is invited as the guest for this special round.; Contestants perform certain tasks and surprise their loved ones with special gifts.				
9	18; 19	11 September 2021; 12 September 2021	—N/a	Halli Round	Roopa and Prashanth
9	Contestants perform the tasks related to the village lifestyle which was a great treat to watch.; Tara and Anupama's gossip conversation wins everyone's hearts.				
10	20; 21	18 September 2021; 19 September 2021	—N/a	Raja Rani with Maharani	Harini and Sreekanth
10	The mothers-in-law of the team of all teams arrive and perform tasks with their son and daughters-in-law.; Chandan and Sreekanth steals the show.				
11	22; 23	25 September 2021; 26 September 2021	Raju Talikote, Prema & Prema; Rank 10 (Walked)	Filmy Romantic Round	Harini and Sreekanth
11	Diganth and Aindrita Ray are invited as the guests for the special round.; Sreekanth and Harini steal the show.; Sonu Gowda is invited to support her sister Neha on the show				
12	24; 25	2 October 2021; 3 October 2021	Aiyappa and Anu; Rank 09 (Walked)	Home Sweet Home Round	Chandan Shetty and Niveditha
12	Contestants perform tasks related to their daily life.; Chandan Shetty and Chandan Gowda ace the Chutney making task.				
13	26; 27	9 October 2021; 10 October 2021	—N/a	Namma Yejamanarandre Sumne Alla Round	Sameer Acharaya and Shravani
13	Contestants perform tasks related to the strength and capabilities of husband life.; Priyanka Upendra graces the show to celebrate the Dasara festival.				
14 (Quarter Finale)	28; 29	23 October 2021; 24 October 2021	Sujay Shastri and Sinchana; Rank 08	Entertainment Round	Roopa and Prashanth
14 (Quarter Finale)	Contestants give their best in the entertainment round.; Sreekanth and Harini & Roopa and Prashanth steals the show.				
15 (Semi Finale)	30; 31	6 November 2021; 7 November 2021	Sameer Acharya and Shravani; Rank 07	Acting Round	—N/a
15 (Semi Finale)	Contestants steal the show through their acting capabilities in the acting round.; Sreekanth and Harini, Chandan and Neha, Ishitha and Muruga, Chandan Shetty and Niveditha and Roopa and Prashanth get the ticket to the finale.				
16 (Mahamilana)	32; 33	14 November 2021; 15 November 2021	—N/a	—N/a	—N/a
16 (Mahamilana)	The show had a crossover with Ede Tumbe Haduvenu.; Both the show contestants performed in a high octane way.				
17 (Grand Finale)	34; 35	20 November 2021; 21 November 2021	—N/a	—N/a	—N/a
17 (Grand Finale)	Doddanna and his wife were invited as the guests for the finale episode.; The new reality show Nanamma Super Star was launched on the finale stage.				
