= Karvva =

Karva
- theatrical release poster
- Kannada: ಕರ್ವ
- Directed by: Navaneeth
- Written by: Navaneeth
- Screenplay by: Navaneeth; G Bhaskar; RJ Rohith
- Story by: Navaneeth
- Produced by: Krishna Chaithanya
- Starring: Thilak; Devaraj; Anisha Ambrose; RJ Rohith; Anu Poovamma; Poonam Singar
- Cinematography: Mohan
- Edited by: Venkatesh UDV
- Music by: Ravi Basrur
- Production company: Sri Swarnalatha Productions
- Distributed by: Jayanna Films
- Release date: 27 May 2016 (India)
- Running time: 108 minutes
- Country: India
- Language: Kannada
- Box office: ₹ 10-11 crores

Karvva (also spelled as Karva) is a 2016 Indian Kannada horror film written and directed by Navaneeth. The film was produced by Krishna Chaithanya under the banner of Sri Swarnalatha Productions and its theater distribution was handled by Jayanna films. The film was released on 27 May 2016. It was later dubbed in Tamil as Idam Porul Aavi. It is also dubbed in Hindi as Karvva.

== Plot ==
The film is a compendium of two linear story lines, related to the final plot. The first story line follows a documentary film crew who are out to debunk a rumor about a haunted house, while the other recounts the kidnapping of a rich businessman’s daughter. The connection between the two linear story lines is a classic, which is set in a worn down mansion located somewhere in the Karnataka countryside.

When a non-residing Indian (NRI) attempts to sell his ancestral property, he finds that it has a nasty reputation as a haunted house. In an attempt to improve his chances of a sale, he enlists the help of a documentary filmmaker, specializing in investigations of supernatural events. The TV crew also has some kind of spiritual adviser and a scientist with a machine that measures ghost activity. However, despite all their skepticism, the crew finds more than they bargained for in the abandoned house. In a plan to exorcise the spirit, they aim to return at a more auspicious time.

The other storyline follows Thilak, a spoiled, rich kid who lives the high life; until he loses a large amount of money gambling. When his father (Devaraj) decides that enough is enough after hearing a fake need for more money from Tilak and refuses to bail him out. Amruta (Anisha Ambrose), Thilak’s sister, tries to get her father to help Thilak, but is kidnapped and a ransom note sent to Devaraj. The kidnappers choose Thilak to deliver the ransom money and the directions he follows take him to an abandoned mansion somewhere in the Karnataka countryside. Thilak is shown to be conniving with the kidnappers to extort money from his father so that he can continue living his flamboyant lifestyle. When they decide to escape after obtaining the money from Thilak, the car refuses to start, leading Amruta to suggest that they spend that the night at the mansion itself.

It is revealed that this mansion is the same as the one the TV crew was investigating in order to debunk the rumors of supernatural elements living in it. The five youngsters find an old book, which tells the story of Vaidehi, a woman who lived in that very mansion long ago. Vaidehi was considered to be an ill-omen right from the time of her marriage, and was tortured to death by her family members who had plotted to kill her. After her death, her spirit haunted the house, taking the lives of all those who entered. Mysterious happenings in the house terrify the five people, culminating in Rohit being mortally wounded, who warns Thilak about an evil spirit that his sister is housing, before apparently dying.

Thilak and others flee the house and return to Bangalore, where they resume their normal lives. It is revealed that Thilak was conned by Rohit and Amruta working together to defraud him of a large sum of money, and all the mysterious happenings were engineered by Rohit (who is actually alive) and Amruta. Rohit plans to swindle other people as well, and is shown selling the house to some investors. When he goes into the bungalow after finalizing the deal with the buyers, the mysterious happenings at the house begin again (on the anniversary of Vaidehi's death), and the movie ends with the couple trapped in the house with Vaidehi's spirit.

== Cast ==
- Tilak Shekar as Tilak
- Devaraj as Raghu
- Anisha Ambrose as Amruta
- RJ Rohith as Rohith
- Anu Poovamma
- Poonam Singar
- Vijay Chendoor as Chandru
- Srinivas Prabhu as the Raja bungalow owner
- Padmaja Rao
- K S Sridhar
- N L Narendra Babu
- Mandeep Roy as Tilak's father's PA
- Rockline Sudhakar
- Ravindranath as Police Inspector Murali Krishna
- Nagendra Shah
- Jayasheela
- Pruthvi Ambaar as Rahul (uncredited)

== Reception ==
A critic from The Times of India wrote that "The makers had mentioned how this film has the thrill and entertainment factor that an Abbas-Mastan film in Bollywood has, and they don't fail those words. How? Go find out yourself".
