= List of Kannada films of 2015 =

A list of Kannada language films produced in the Kannada film industry in India in 2015

- Films are generally released every Friday or Festival Day
- In addition films can be released on specific festival days.

== Box office collection ==
The highest-grossing Kannada films released in 2015, by worldwide box office gross revenue, are as follows.

The rank of the films in the following depends on the worldwide gross. The budget is only for knowledgeable purpose.

The highest worldwide gross of 2015
Rank	Title	Production company	Worldwide gross	References
1	RangiTaranga	Shree Devi Entertainers	₹43 crore (US$4.5 million)	
2	Uppi 2	Upendra Productions	₹40 crore (US$4.2 million)	
3	Mr. Airavata	Sandesh Combines	₹40 crore (US$4.2 million)	
4	Masterpiece	Hombale Films	₹35 crore (US$3.6 million)	
5	Ranna	Sri Nimishamba Productions	₹30.80 crore (US$3.2 million)	

== Film awards events ==
- 62nd National Film Awards
- Karnataka State Film Awards
- 62nd Filmfare Awards South
- 4th South Indian International Movie Awards
- Suvarna Film Awards, by Suvarna channel.
- Udaya Film Awards, by Udaya Channel
- Bangalore International Film Festival
- Bangalore Times Film Awards

== Scheduled releases ==
=== January–June ===
Opening		Title	Director	Cast	Genre	Notes	Ref
J A N	1	Khushi Khushiyagi	Yogi G. Raj	Ganesh, Amulya, Nandini Rai	Romance	Remake of Telugu film Gunde Jaari Gallanthayyinde (2013); Produced by HPR Enterprises	
J A N	2	Shivam	Srinivasa Raju	Upendra, Saloni Aswani, Ragini Dwivedi, P. Ravi Shankar, Makarand Deshpande	Thriller	Produced by Tanvi Films	
J A N	9	Paipoti	K. Ram Narayan	Gururaj Jaggesh, Niranjan Shetty, Poojasri	Romance	Produced by Lakshya Films	
J A N	9	Shabarimale Yatre	Sairam Shanthakumar	Aniruddh, Akshay Kumar, Guruprasad, Vivek	Devotional	Produced by Suryalakshmi Creations	
J A N	15	Jackson	Sanath Kumar	Duniya Vijay, Pavana Gowda, Rangayana Raghu	Comedy	Remake of Tamil film Idharkuthane Aasaipattai Balakumara (2013); Produced by GK Ventures	
J A N	23	Siddhartha	Prakash	Vinay Rajkumar, Apoorva Arora, Sudharani	Romance	Produced by Poornima Enterprises	
J A N	23	Mirchi Mandakki Kadak Chai	Sanjotha	Badikella Pradeep, Apoorva Bharadwaj, Sachin BG, Namratha	Comedy/Romance	Produced by Thanu Talkies	
J A N	23	Suvvi	M. C. Venkatesh	Arjun, Manasi, Ramya, M. D. Kaushik	Romance	Produced by Lakshmi Art Films	
J A N	23	Ond Chance Kodi	Sathyamitra	Ravishankar Gowda, Patre Ajith, Dr. Nandini, Linto, Shruti, B. C. Patil, Tennis Krishna, Sadhu Kokila	Comedy	Remake of Malayalam film Best of Luck (2010); Produced by Moulya Sandesha Productions	
J A N	30	Abhinetri	Satish Pradhan	Pooja Gandhi, Atul Kulkarni, P. Ravi Shankar, Makarand Deshpande, Neethu	Biographical drama	Produced by Pooja Gandhi Productions	
J A N	30	Prana Koduve Gelathi	Yathiesh B. S.	Kiran Karla, Raksha Shenoy	Romance	Produced by Sri Vasanth Movie Makers	
F E B	6	Raja Rajendra	Pon Kumaran	Sharan, Ishita Dutta, Vimala Raman, P. Ravi Shankar, Sadhu Kokila	Fantasy / Comedy	Produced by Sri Venkateshwara Krupa Creations	
F E B	6	Eradu Kanasu	Dorai–Bhagavan	Rajkumar, Kalpana, Manjula, K. S. Ashwath, Balakrishna	Drama	Re-release of the 1974 film Produced by Anupam Movies	
F E B	13	DK	Vijay Kampali	Prem, Chaitra Chandranath, Rishikumara Swamy	Satire comedy	Produced by J. J. Cine Productions	
F E B	13	Kotigond Love Story	Jaggu Sirsi	Rakesh Adiga, Shubha Poonja, Heather Elizabeth Tully, Biradar	Romance	Produced by HLN Raj	
F E B	20	Mythri	Giriraj	Mohanlal, Puneeth Rajkumar, Archana, Bhavana, Atul Kulkarni	Drama	Produced by Omkar Movies	
F E B	20	Benkipatna	TK Dayanand	Prathap Narayan, Anushree, Arun Sagar, Prakash Belawadi, Jahangir	Romance	Produced by Maasthi Movies	
F E B	27	Rudra Tandava	Guru Deshpande	Chiranjeevi Sarja, Radhika Kumaraswamy, Krishna, Kumar Govind, Girish Karnad, P. Ravi Shankar	Action	Remake of Tamil film Pandiya Naadu; Produced by G Cinemas	
F E B	27	A Day in the City	Venkat Bharadwaj	Srinivasa Kappanna, Laxman Shivashankar, Sridharan, Manohar Ramakumar, Lokesh Chandra	Thriller	Produced by EAF	
M A R	6	Flop	Karan Kumar	Vijeth Gowda, Sukrutha Wagle, Sandeep, Akhil	Drama	Produced by Punyakoti Cine Cefe	
M A R	6	Goa	Surya	Komal Kumar, Tarun Chandra, Srikanth, Sharmila Mandre, Rachel Waiz, Sonu Gowda	Romantic comedy	Remake of Tamil film Goa (2010); Produced by Shankar Productions	
M A R	6	Ondu Romantic Crime Kathe	Sam J. Chaitanya	Arun, Ashwini Chandrashekar, Poojashree	Crime	Remake of Telugu film Oka Romantic Crime Katha (2012); Produced by Malineni Productions Pvt Ltd.	
M A R	12	Om	Upendra	Shiva Rajkumar, Prema, Srishanthi, Sadhu Kokila, Honnavalli Krishna	Action, Romance	Produced by Poornima Enterprises; Re-release of 1995 film	
M A R	13	Master Mind	Kumar Govind	Rajvardhan, Kumar Govind, Thamanna, Bhakthi, Bullet Prakash	Action	Produced by Kumar Govind Productions	
M A R	13	Raincoat	Gaali Lucky	Vijay Jetty, Apoorva Rai, Ramya Ramachandran	Romance	Produced by Lucky Movies	
M A R	13	Q	Sanjeev Megothi	Neeraj Shah, Akhila, Neha Saxena, Dhanraj	Drama	Produced by London Ganesh	
M A R	20	Krishna Leela	Shashank	Ajay Rao, Mayuri Kyatari, Rangayana Raghu	Romance	Produced by Sri Krishna Arts Creations	
M A R	20	Rhaatee	A. P. Arjun	Dhananjay, Shruthi Hariharan, Bullet Prakash, Suchendra Prasad	Romance	Produced by Harmonium Reeds	
M A R	27	Mutthina Maleyali	Manju Sagar	Manju Sagar, Ramnitu Chaudhary, Sharath Lohitashwa, Ramakrishna	Romance	Produced by Manju Movies	
M A R	27	Kaldogbitte	Uday Prem	Ashu Ashok, Poojitha, Balaram, Bank Janardhan, Bhavya	Drama	Produced by Adrushta Combines	
A P R	2	Vaastu Prakaara	Yogaraj Bhat	Rakshit Shetty, Jaggesh, Aishani Shetty, Parul Yadav, Ananth Nag, Sudha Rani	Satire	Produced by Yogaraj Movies	
A P R	3	Katte	Om Prakash Rao	Nagashekar, Chandan Kumar, Shravya Rao, Vriksha, Om Prakash Rao	Romantic drama	Remake of Tamil film Kedi Billa Killadi Ranga (2013); Produced by Renuka Movie Makers	
A P R	3	Just Maduveli	Kolar Seena	Harish Kumar, Deepa Gowda, Gayathri Gowda, Bullet Prakash, Bank Janardhan	Romance	Produced by Universal Hatrick Combines	
A P R	3	Nagaari	Nandish	Vikas, Anupama, Vinay Devaraj, Hruthik, Sharath Lohitashwa, Rangayana Raghu	Romance	Produced by Bhoomika Cine Creations	
A P R	10	Rana Vikrama	Pawan Wadeyar	Puneeth Rajkumar, Anjali, Adah Sharma, Rangayana Raghu	Action Thriller	Produced by Jayanna films	
A P R	17	Melody	Nanjunda Krishna	Rajesh Krishnan, Chethan Gandharva, Karthika Menon, Akshatha, Ramakrishna, Mandya Ramesh	Romance	Produced by Sri Amba Bhagavathi Films	
A P R	17	Khaidi	R. Guruduth	Dhanush, Chandini, Tabla Nani, Mohan Raj, Veena Sundar	Action	Produced by The Grand Creations	
A P R	17	Male Nilluvavarege	Mohan Shankar	Mohan Shankar, Kavitha Bohra, H. G. Dattatreya, Sharath Lohitashwa	Thriller	Produced by Mohan Talkies	
A P R	17	Hingyake	T. S. Satyajith	Pratheek Thakkar, Deepthi Mane, Sunil, Kushi	Romantic comedy		
A P R	24	Daksha	S. Narayan	Duniya Vijay, Pankaj Narayan, Neha Patil, Rangayana Raghu, Bullet Prakash, Padmaja Rao	Action	Produced by Cheluvambika Pictures	
A P R	24	Mahakali	S. Mahendar	Malashri, Dileep Prakash, Pooja	Action	Produced by Simhadri Productions	
M A Y	1	Endendigu	Imran Sardhariya	Ajay Rao, Radhika Pandit, H. G. Dattatreya, Ashok, Tabla Nani	Romance	Produced by SV Productions	
M A Y	8	Rebel	Rajendra Singh Babu	Auditya, Sanjjana, Preetika Rao, Shawar Ali, Suhasini Maniratnam, Sudharani, Sharath Lohitashwa, Ramakrishna	Action	Produced by Mysore Dream Merchants	
M A Y	15	Bombay Mittai	Chandra Mohan	Niranjan Deshpande, Disha Pandey, Bullet Prakash, Chikkanna, Kishori Ballal	Romantic drama	Produced by Touchwood Creations	
M A Y	15	Mrugashira	Srivatsa	Prajwal Devaraj, Manasa Himavarsha, Ananth Nag, Avinash, Tabla Nani, Pannagha Bharan, Sadhu Kokila	Action	Produced by Yathiraya Films	
M A Y	22	Eradondla Mooru	Kumar Dutt	Chandan Kumar, Shwetha Pandit, Shobhitha, K. S. Sridhar	Romance	Produced by Bhooswara Cinema House	
M A Y	22	Murari	H. Vasu	Sri Murali, Rashmi Jadhav, Sharath Lohitashwa, Petrol Prasanna	Action	Produced by Lakshmikantha Movies	
M A Y	29	Patharagitthi	Eshwar	Srikanth, Praju Poovaiah, Lucky Shankar, Tabla Nani, Bullet Prakash, Shakeela	Romance	Produced by Cine Stall	
J U N	4	Ranna	Nanda Kishore	Sudeepa, Rachita Ram, Hariprriya, Madhoo, Prakash Raj, Devaraj, Sadhu Kokila	Action	Remake of Telugu film Attarintiki Daredi (2013); Produced by Nimishamba Productions	
J U N	5	Vidaaya	P. Sheshadri	Suchendra Prasad, Lakshmi Gopalaswamy, H. G. Dattatreya, Pratham	Drama	Produced by Basanth Productions	
J U N	12	Vajrakaya	Harsha. A	Shiva Rajkumar, Karunya Ram, Nabha Natesh, Sadhu Kokila, Avinash	Action	Produced by Tanvi Films	
J U N	26	Aata Paata	Kodlu Ramakrishna	Kumari Lahari, Jai Jagadish, Ramesh Bhat, Suchithra, Padmaja Rao, Arjun Devayya	Children	Produced by Sri Dharmasthala Manjunatheshwara Enterprises	
J U N	26	Ganapa	Prabhu Srinivas	Santhosh, Priyanka, Padmaja Rao, Petrol Prasana, Tharun Kumar, Kalyan Kumar, Devadarshini	Drama	Produced by Sri Dharmasthala Manjunatheshwara Enterprises	
J U N	26	Goolihatti	Shashank Raj	Pavan Surya, Tejaswini Prakash, Aman, Raghavendra, Adi Lokesh, Appu Venkatesh, Mahesh, Doddanna, Mamatha Rahuth	Action	Produced by Arjun Enterprises	

=== July–December ===
Opening		Title	Director	Cast	Genre	Notes	Ref
J U L	4	Aarambha	Abhi Hanakere	Mithun Prakash, Kavya, Abhirami, Rasagavala Narayan, Baby Hasini	Drama	Produced by Shara Productions	
J U L	4	RangiTaranga	Anup Bhandari	Nirup Bhandari, Avantika Shetty, Radhika Chetan, Sai Kumar	Mystery thriller	Produced by Shree Devi Entertainers	
J U L	10	Fashion	Mohamed Ziaulla	Gagan Nimesh, Athishri Sarkar, Shefali Singh, Samikshaa Bhat	Drama	Produced by Z Films	
J U L	17	Preethiyinda	Raju Halaguru	Rakesh Adiga, Sonia Gowda, Avinash, Girija Lokesh	Romance	Produced by Sri Guru Anugraha Productions	
J U L	24	Bullet Basya	Jayatheertha	Sharan, Hariprriya, Yathiraj Jaggesh, Rangayana Raghu	Comedy	Produced by Jayanna Combines	
J U L	24	Mane Thumba Bari Jamba	Arunesh - Naveen	Jagadish, Mahesh, Lakshmish Bhat, Akshata, Jyothi Gowda, Anita	Drama		
J U L	24	Kanasu	Santhosh Shetty Kateel	Gangadhar Bellare, Chidananda Kamath, Thammanna Shetty, Vasantha Lakshmi	Drama	Produced by Ganasiri Creations and Manikya Combines	
J U L	31	Lodde	S. V. Suresh Raj	Komal Kumar, Akanksha Puri, Shayaji Shinde, Avinash	Comedy	Produced by Ullas Cinemas	
J U L	31	Red Alert	Chandra Mahesh	H. H. Mahadev, Anjana Menon, Suman, Vinod Kumar Alva, Bullet Prakash, Kuri Prathap	Crime action	Produced by Cine Nilaya Creations LLP	
J U L	31	Sapnon Ki Rani	A. R. Babu	Srujan Lokesh, Aishwarya Shindogi, Chikkanna, Ashok	Romance	Produced by Sun Shine Films	
J U L	31	Shirdi Sri Saibaba	M. R. Balakrishna	Sudharshan, Asha, Kavya, Rahul, Abhi, Chandana (voice-overs)	Animation	Produced by Mediateck I Solutions Pvt Ltd	
A U G	7	Male	Tejas	Prem Kumar, Amulya, Sadhu Kokila, Bullet Prakash	Romantic Comedy	Produced by R Chandru productions	
A U G	14	Buguri	M. D. Sridhar	Ganesh, Richa Panai, Erica Fernandes, Sadhu Kokila	Romantic Comedy	Produced by SMG Movies	
A U G	14	Uppi 2	Upendra	Upendra, Kristina Akheeva, Parul Yadav, Priyanka Upendra	Psychological thriller	Produced by Upendra productions	
A U G	21	Shh Eccharike	Nagaraj Kandagal	Maruthi, Akshatha, Baby Shreya, Ajith	Horror	Produced by JSM Creations	
A U G	28	Aatagara	K. M. Chaitanya	Chiranjeevi Sarja, Meghana Raj, Parul Yadav, Ananth Nag, P. Ravi Shankar, Anu Prabhakar, Dwarakish	Suspense thriller	Produced by Dwarakish Chitra	
A U G	28	Drohi	Parashuram B. Dalanjana	Jashwanth Jadhav, Prakash Naik, Amruthashree	Drama	Produced by Sri Ad Arts	
A U G	28	Muddu Manase	Ananth Shine	Arun Gowda, Nithya Ram, Aishwarya Nag	Romance	Produced by M. M. S. Movies	
S E P	4	RX Soori	Sreejay	Duniya Vijay, Akankshaa, Ravi Shankar, Adi Lokesh	Romantic Crime drama	Produced by Suresh Pictures	
S E P	4	Om Namaha	Vijayendran	Vijayendran, Vaidehi, Petrol Prasanna	Drama	Produced by MPG Productions	
S E P	11	141	Bhavaji	Farooq Khan, Tanya, Kavya Acharya	Erotic drama	Produced by Apsara Movies	
S E P	11	Billa	Rama Narayanan; Shiva Maamani	Krishnadev, Anjana, Shravanth, Sudharani, Bhavya, Jai Jagadish, Ashok	Action	Produced by Sri Thenandal Films	
S E P	11	Geetha Bangle Store	Manju Mithra	Pramod Panju, Sushmitha, Achyuth Kumar, Guruprasad, Bhavya, Vinaya Prasad, Mandya Ramesh	Drama	Produced by Jathin Cinemas	
S E P	11	Kendasampige	Duniya Soori	Santhosh Reva, Manvitha Harish, Rajesh, Sheethal Shetty, Prakash Belawadi	Romance	Produced by Parimala Film Factory	
S E P	11	Namak Haraam	Nagaraj Peenya	Krishna Mahesh, Rapid Rashmi, Rajendra Karanth, Yathiraj	Romantic action	Produced by Nihal Movies	
S E P	17	Charlie	Shiva	Krishna, Vaishali Deepak, Milana Nagaraj, Gurunandan	Action	Produced by LYM Movie Makers	
S E P	17	Luv U Alia	Indrajit Lankesh	V. Ravichandran, Bhoomika Chawla, Chandan Kumar, Sangeita Chauhan, Sudharani, Sudeep, Srujan Lokesh	Romance	Produced by Sammy's Magic Cinemas	
S E P	18	Neene Bari Neene	Deepak Thimmaiah	Aniissh Tejeshwar, Deepika Kamaiah, Samyukta Hornad	Romance	Produced by AKK Entertainment	
S E P	24	Arjuna	PC Shekhar	Prajwal Devaraj, Bhama, Devaraj, Ramesh Bhat, Sheethal Shetty	Romantic thriller	Produced by Arya Creations	
S E P	25	A 2nd Hand Lover	Raghav Marasur	Ajay Rao, Pranitha Subhash, Anisha Ambrose, Aishwarya, Sadhu Kokila	Romance	Produced by Arya Creations	
S E P	25	Aa Rathri	Mandya Nagaraj	Ravi Chethan, Amithashree	Thriller	Produced by	
S E P	25	Chandrika	Yogesh M	Jayram Karthik, Kamna Jethmalani, Srimukhi, Girish Karnad, Chikkanna	Horror	Produced by Flying Wheels Productions; Simultaneously made in Telugu	
S E P	25	Naanu Avanalla...Avalu	B. S. Lingadevaru	Sanchari Vijay, Shwetha Desai, Aravind Kuplikar, Madhushree	Drama	Produced by RG Productions; Winner of two awards at 62nd National Film Awards	
O C T	1	Mr. Airavata	A. P. Arjun	Darshan, Urvashi Rautela, Prakash Raj, Ananth Nag, Sadhu Kokila, Bullet Prakash	Action	Produced by Sandesh Productions	
O C T	2	Thamisra	Prakash Hassan	Sugreev, Kavya, Sandeep R. Nair, Jeevan Suresh	Horror	Produced by RMN Productions	
O C T	9	Dove	Santhu	Anoop Sa. Ra. Govindu, Aditi Rao, Rakesh Adiga, Madalasa Sharma, Avinash, Jai Jagadish, Jaggesh	Romance	Produced by RS Productions	
O C T	9	Ring Master	Vishruth Naik	Arun Sagar, Anushree, Shrunga, Shwetha	Fantasy thriller	Produced by Uppi Entertainers	
O C T	9	Titlu Beka	Anand G. K.	Ayush, Neha Patil, Manasi, Vardhan, Raghavendra	Romance	Produced by Veerabhadreshwara Movie Makers	
O C T	16	7	Chandrashekar Srivastav	Chandrashekar Srivastav, Roopa Nataraj, Sadhu Kokila, Avinash, Rangayana Raghu, Ravi Kale, Danny Kuttappa	Drama	Produced by Big Boss Productions	
O C T	16	Pandith Bhagyavidhatha	Krishnendra Pandit	Krishnendra Pandith, Meghashree, Deepa Gowda, Mallesh Edehalli	Drama	Produced by SKP Productions	
O C T	16	Plus	Gadda Viji	Anant Nag, Sudharani, Chetan Chandra, Rithesh, Shalini Vadnikatti, P. Ravi Shankar, Achyuth Kumar	Suspense Drama	Produced by Filmy People Productions and Honna Heights	
O C T	22	Ganga	Sai Prakash	Malashri, Ravi Chethan, Srinivasa Murthy, Suchendra Prasad, Pavitra Lokesh	Action	Produced by Ramu Films	
O C T	22	Ring Road Suma	Priya Belliyappa	Khushie, Nikita Thukral, Duniya Vijay, Avinash, Malavika Avinash	Crime drama	Produced by Vega Entertainments	
O C T	23	Vascodigama	Madhuchandra	Kishore, Parvathy Nair, Suchendra Prasad	Comedy	Produced by Ramu Films	
O C T	30	Bettanagere	Mohan Gowda Bettanagere	Sumanth Shailendra, Akshay, Nayana, Vinod Kambli, Avinash, Achyuth Kumar, Bullet Prakash	Crime-thriller	Produced by Savika Enterprises	
O C T	30	Kaada Haadiya Hoogalu	L. N. Mukunda Raj	Siri Gowri, Prakash Urs, Venkata Raju, Nagathihalli Chandrashekar, B Suresh, K V Nagaraja Murthy	Children's	Produced by Nagathihalli Cine Creations and Teachers Cinema	
O C T	30	Kanchana	Vijay Surana	Rahul, Roopa Nataraj, Vijay Chendoor, Hemanth, Hanumanthe Gowda, Geetha, Roopa Gowda	Horror	Produced by Om Shanti Vijaya Productions	
O C T	30	Mana Mechhida Bangaru	Sai Prakash	Bangaru Hanumanthu, Roja, P. Ravi Shankar, Srinivasa Murthy, Ramesh Bhat, Sadhu Kokila, Shobhraj, Shashikala	Romance	Produced by Bangaru Film Combines	
O C T	30	Mumtaz	Raghava Murali	Dharma Keerthiraj, Sharmila Mandre, Keerthiraj, Chikkanna, M. S. Umesh, Rockline Sudhakar, Darshan	Romance	Produced by Action Cut Creations	
O C T	30	Thippaji Circle	Aditya Chikkanna	Pooja Gandhi, Suresh Sharma, Dhruva Sharma, Neha Patil, Bhavya, Anitha Bhat	Biographical drama	Produced by Ruby Cine Kraft	
N O V	6	Madam Helida Kathe	Bhadravathi Ramakrishna; D Dasharath	Baby Sanjana, Master B N Chethan, Master Bharath, Master Sumukha, Master Bharani, Mandeep Roy, Mukhyamantri Chandru, Amrutha Katti	Children's	Produced by Mahathayi Films	
N O V	6	Ouija	Rajkumar Reddy	Bharath, Shraddha Das, Madhuri Itagi, Gayathri Iyer, Kadambari Jethwani, Avinash, Sayaji Shinde	Supernatural horror	Produced by Vega Entertainment	
N O V	6	Rakshasi	Ashraf	Navarasan, Sindhu Lokanath, G. K. Reddy, Kuri Prathap, Sujith	Horror	Remake of Tamil film Pisaasu (2014); Produced by Sri Lakshmi Vrushadri Productions	
N O V	6	Sri Sai	Sai Prakash	Harish Raj, Naveen Krishna, Sai Prakash, Roja, Disha Poovaiah, Srinivasa Murthy, Ramesh Bhat, Bank Janardhan	Devotional	Produced by Sri Lakshmi Vrushadri Productions	
N O V	6	Vamshodharaka	Aditya Chikkanna	Vijay Raghavendra, Meghana Raj, Naveen Krishna, Lakshmi, Srinivasa Murthy	Drama	Produced by Om Sri Kalikamatha Productions	
N O V	12	Ramleela	Vijay Kiran	Chiranjeevi Sarja, Amulya, Sanjjana, Urvashi, Sadhu Kokila, Rangayana Raghu	Romantic	Remake of Telugu film Loukyam (2014); Produced by Soundarya Jagadish Films	
N O V	13	Baa Naale Baa	T. K. Arasu	Ajith Kumar, Suvarna, Dharani, Harshitha, Shobhraj, Ramesh Surya, Bank Janardhan	Thriller	Produced by Sri Yogeshwari Art Creations	
N O V	19	Octopus	P. Annayya	Kishore, Yagna Shetty, Thilak Shekar, Tara, Ashwini, Jai Jagadish, Bullet Prakash	Action	Produced by Sri Charanth Films	
N O V	20	Bengaluru 560023	Pradeep Raj	Karthik Jayaram, Chandan Kumar, Dhruv, Rajeev, Sanjjana, Shivani	Sports Comedy	Remake of Tamil film Chennai 600028 (2007); Produced by Indirajal Advertisement Solutions, Veerabhadreshwara Cinemas	
N O V	20	Boxer	Preetham Gubbi	Dhananjay, Kruthika Jayakumar, Charandeep, Rangayana Raghu, Sumithra	Action	Produced by Jayanna Combines	
N O V	20	Mamu Tea Angadi	A. Paramesh	Varun Kumar, Abhishek, Rithesh, Mahesh Raj, Sangeetha Bhat, Rashi Singh, Archana Singh	Drama	Produced by Sri Ram Sannurkar Touring Talkies	
N O V	20	Shambo Mahadeva	Mysore Manju	Akash, Neha Patil, R. N. Sudarshan, Sathyajith, Shobhraj, Vijanath Biradar, Ganesh Rao	Drama	Produced by Sri Sanjana Movies	
N O V	27	1st Rank Raju	Naresh Kumar H. N.	Gurunandan, Apoorva Gowda, Thanishka Kapoor, Ananth Nag, Achyuth Kumar, Sudha Belavadi, Sadhu Kokila	Comedy drama	Produced by Dolphin Entertainment	
N O V	27	Alone	JKS	Simran, Nikesha Patel, Vasishta N. Simha, Iniya, Ganesh Prasad, Bullet Prakash, Tabla Nani, Dilip, Avinash	Thriller	Simultaneously made in Kannada, Tamil and Telugu; Produced by RJ Combines	
N O V	27	Pattabhisheka	KSR	Yuvraj Kalyankumar, Gowri Nair, Khushi, R T Rama	Drama	Produced by Yasha Films	
N O V	27	Rocket	Shivashashi	Sathish Ninasam, Aishani Shetty, Achyuth Kumar, Nagendra Shah, Padmaja Rao	Action romance	Produced by Sathish Picture House	
N O V	27	The Plan	Keerthi	Ananth Nag, Kousthubh Jayakumar, Hemanth, Sriram, Jagadish, Sanath, Gauthami, Harish Roy, Ramesh Bhat	Action thriller	Produced by Day Dream Creations and Malgudi Talkies	
D E C	4	Care of Footpath 2	Kishan Shrikanth	Deepp Pathak, Avika Gor, Dingri Naresh, Esha Deol, Kishan Shrikanth, Karthik Jayaram, Anees Bazmee, Shivaram	Drama	Produced by Kiran Movie Makers Inc.	
D E C	4	Gowdrudugru	Venkateshwara Reddy E	Santhosh, Gopikrishna, Ravi Shankar, Shilpa Ashwi, Priyanka Malnad, Pooja, Bullet Prakash	Drama	Produced by Varshitha Entertainments	
D E C	4	Manitha	Savitha Bernard	Shailesh, Bhagyashree, Ashwini, Bharath, Adugodi Srinivas, Dingri Nagaraj, Shivakumar	Children's	Produced by Abhishek Gowda Pictures	
D E C	4	Minchagi Nee Baralu	Randeep Shantharam Mahadik	Diganth, Kriti Kharbanda, Ramesh Bhat, Dilip Raj, Archana, Sihi Kahi Chandru	Romance	Produced by Strawberry Entertainment	
D E C	4	Rathaavara	Chandrashekar Bandiyappa	Sri Murali, Rachita Ram, Ravi Shankar, Chikkanna, Sadhu Kokila, Charan Raj	Action thriller	Produced by Dharmashree Enterprises	
D E C	11	Aadhya	Vinod Kumar. J	Bharath Gowda, Gouthami Jadhav, Neelan Reddy, Anil Reddy, Ganesh, Harsha, Richard D’Cruze, Faith Pereira, Harisutha	Action	Produced by Genesis Motion Pictures	
D E C	11	Cigarette	Shankar	Nagashekar, Nagendra, Roopashri, Rakshitha Ponnamma, Sadhu Kokila	Comedy Drama	Produced by Shiva Shankar Film Factory	
D E C	11	Jaathre	Ravitheja	Chetan Chandra, Aishwarya Nag, Ramesh Bhat, Shobhraj, Usha Bhandari	Drama	Produced by Shukthi Cine Production & URC Movies	
D E C	11	Sharp Shooter	Ghouse Peer	Diganth, Sangeetha Chauhan, Chikkanna, Lakshmi, Achyuth Kumar, Sudharani, Bhajarangi Lokesh	Action Comedy	Produced by S B Entertainment	
D E C	18	Flop Director	Durga Prasad	Sanjeev, Rachana Gowda, Santhosh, Honnavalli Krishna	Romance	Produced by Creative Pictures	
D E C	18	Huccha Venkat	Huccha Venkat	Huccha Venkat, Kavitha Bist, Sudarshan, Shailashree, Keerthiraj, Ramesh Bhat, M.S. Umesh	Romance	Re-release of 2014 film. Produced by Sri Sankashtahara Ganapathi Cine Pictures	
D E C	18	Prema Pallakki	V.Sudhakar Shetty	Vikram, Ashwini Chandrashekar, Ananth Nag, Bhavya, Achyuth Kumar, Ramesh Bhat	Romance	Produced by Nisarga Pictures	
D E C	24	Masterpiece	Manju Mandavya	Yash, Shanvi Srivastava, Suhasini Maniratnam, Chikkanna, P. Ravi Shankar, Achyuth Kumar	Action-romance	Produced by Hombale Films	
D E C	25	Nigooda Rahasya	M. D. Kowshik	Charan Raj, Ranadheer, Nayana Krishna, Sundar Raj	Mystery thriller	Produced by Kowshik Enterprises	
D E C	25	Om Sharanam Ayyappa	Sharath	Vishnu Vallabha, Shweta Rao, Ganesh Rao, Ratnamala, Master Tushar, Rekha Das, M N Suresh, Master Aditya	Devotional	Produced by Annayappa	
D E C	31	Mr. Premi	D. Shivalinga	Kushal Raj, Leona Lishoy, Tejaswini Prakash, Sai Kumar, Kuri Prathap, Chikkanna, Petrol Prasanna	Romance	Produced by Sri Ankanatheshwara Movies	

== Notable deaths ==
Month	Date	Name	Age	Sex	Profession	Notable work
February	18	D. Ramanaidu	78	Male	Producer	Thavarumane Udugore, Maduve Aagona Baa
March	6	Kishore Te.	36	Male	Editor	Prithvi, Oggarane
March	12	Siddalingaiah	81	Male	Director	Mayor Muthanna, Bangaarada Manushya, Bhootayyana Maga Ayyu, Doorada Betta
March	19	Sanjay Iyer		Male	Actor	Lucia, Uppi2
July	14	M. S. Viswanathan	87	Male	Music director	Eradu Rekhegalu, Benkiyalli Aralida Hoovu, Balondu Uyyale, Mamatheya Madilu
September	27	Tallam Nanjunda Shetty		Male	Former President KFCC	
October	10	Manorama	78	Female	Actress	Devara Gudi, Preethiye Nanna Daiva, Devara Duddu, Premanubandha, Geddavalu Naane
October	20	K. S. L. Swamy (Ravee)	77	Male	Director, Actor, Singer	Thoogudeepa, Kulla Agent 000, Devaru Kotta Thangi, CID 72, Makkala Bhagya, Driver Hanumanthu, Jimmy Gallu, Malaya Marutha, Mithileya Seetheyaru, Harakeya Kuri
