= Uppu Huli Khara =

- Theatrical Poster
- Directed by: Imran Sardhariya
- Written by: Imran Sardhariya
- Produced by: M. Ramesh
- Starring: Malashri; B. Dhananjay; Sharath; Shashi Devraj; Anushree; Jayashree; Shamanth Shetty
- Cinematography: Niranjan Babu
- Edited by: Deepu S.Kumar
- Music by: Judah Sandhy; Prajwal Pai; Kishore Eksa
- Production companies: Tejeshwini Enterprises; Imran Sardhariya Films
- Release date: 24 November 2017
- Running time: 127 minutes
- Country: India
- Language: Kannada

Uppu Huli Khara (transl. Salt, sour and spice) is a 2017 Indian Kannada-language comedy drama film written and directed by Imran Sardhariya, produced by M. Ramesh under the banner Tejeshwini Enterprises. The film stars Malashri, B. Dhananjay, Sharath, Shashi Devraj, Anushree, Jayashree and Shamanth Shetty in prominent roles.

This film marks second directorial venture of Imran Sardhariya. Music was composed by Judah Sandhy, Prajwal Pai and Kishore Eksa and art direction by Shivkumar for the film. Stunt sequence choreographed by Ravi Varma. The principal photography commenced on 18 April 2016 and will be released in 2017.

== Plot ==
The story revolves around a bank robbery and the hunt to find the culprits. Story takes comical twists and turns when the investigating officer is left on wild goose chase. The plot thickens when the investigating officer gets an anonymous call from a girl. The girl reveals the identity and details of three boys who have committed the crime. The investigating officer arrests three youth under suspicion. The Young boys being Vijay Suriya a medical aspirant, Sharath a police aspirant and Dhananjay a Fast-food supplier. The investigating officer faces pressure as this case creates huge momentum on digital media, news rooms and dailies, huge debates and Speculations breaks out. The media attention catches the eyes of the local MLA and other politician who in turn starting interfering in the investigation. Will the investigating officer get to the bottom of the crime, are the boys the real criminals and what happens to the stolen assets of the bank.

== Cast ==
- Malashri
- B. Dhananjay
- Sharath
- Shashi Devraj
- Anushree
- Jayashree
- Shamanth Shetty as Bukki

== Production ==
After the success of the romantic thriller film Endendigu (2015), writer-director Imran Sardhariya announced his next project.

== Soundtrack ==
The soundtrack was composed by Judah Sandhy, Prajwal Pai and Kishore Eksa.

No.	Title	Singer(s)	Length
1.	"Romeo"	Puneeth Rajkumar, Sangeetha Ravindranath
2.	"Nagin"	Shashank Sheshagiri, Snehan Nambiyar
3.	"Hatharike Bappa Re"	Sudeepa
4.	"Janeja"	Prajwal Pai
5.	"Uppu Huli Khara"	MD Pallavi, Shanshank Sheshagiri
6.	Untitled	Sadhu Kokila, Shanshak Sheshagiri
