= B. Dhananjay =

Choreographer

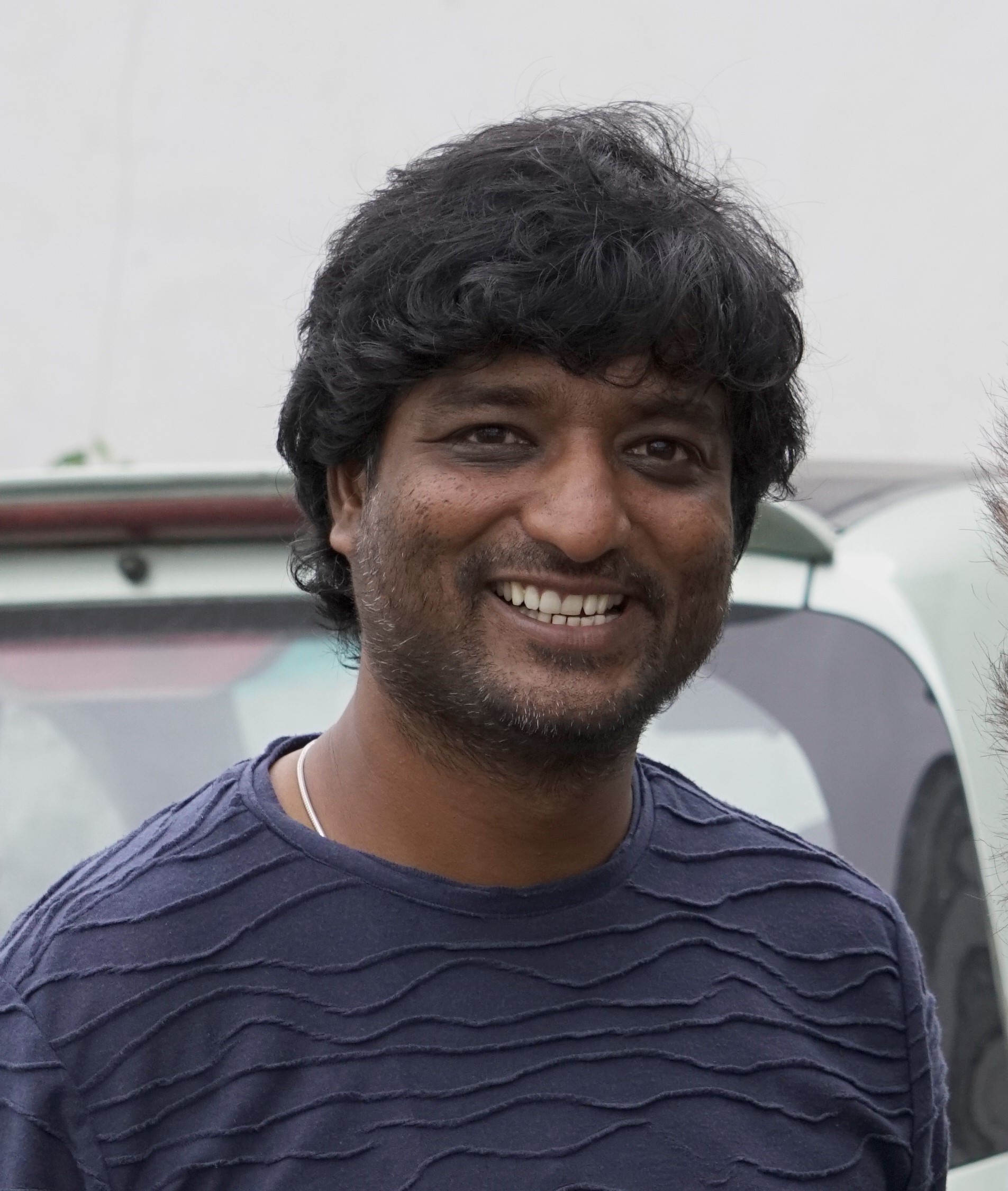
- Born: 8 September 1981 (age 44); Bengaluru, India
- Occupation: Choreographer
- Years active: 1993–present

B. Dhananjay (born 8 September 1981) is an Indian film choreographer and actor who works predominantly in the Kannada Film Industry. He appeared as one of the lead actors in the movie Uppu Huli Khara directed by Imran Sardhariya.

== Career ==
Imran Sardhariya was the director of the movie Uppu Huli Khara and Dhananjay B was one of the heroes. His introduction song was sung by Actor Sudeep. Director Imran Sardhariya said Sudeep's voice sounded divine. As a goodwill gesture more than 400 dancers took part in the song as one of their own was turning hero.

After turning choreographer he has so far choreographed more than 40 songs. He trained Vinay Rajkumar grandson of actor Dr Rajkumar for the movie Ananthu vs Nusrath. The song "MareteHoyite" from the movie Amar (2019 film) was a hit. He choreographed the song "kuttu kuttu kuttappa" which had Sharan (actor) and Apoorva grooving for the movie Victory 2. The song topped the charts at time of its release.

== Choreography ==
Film	Song	Year	Language	Notes
Ananthu vs Nusrath	"iga tane jaariyagide"	2018	Kannada	
Victory 2	"Kuttu Kuttu Kuttappa"	2018	Kannada	
Rugged	"Ninne Preetisuve"	2019	Kannada	
Padde Huli	"7 songs"	2019	Kannada	
Amar	"Maretuhoyite"	2019	Kannada	
Adyaksha in America	"All Songs"	2019	Kannada	
Trivikrama	"Nenne Tanaka"	2022	Kannada	
Gaalipata 2	"Neenu bage hariyada haadu"	2022	Kannada	
Bad Manners	"Nautanki beda"	2023	Kannada	
Bheema	"I Love you kane"	2024	Kannada	
