= Namak Haraam (disambiguation) =

Namak Haraam is a 1973 Indian Hindi-language film.

Namak Haraam or Namak Haram may also refer to:

- Namak Haraam (2015 film), Indian Kannada-language film
- Namak Haram (2023 film), Indian Bhojpuri-language film

== See also ==
- Namak Haram Deorhi, a palace in West Bengal, India
