= Lakshmi Nataraj =

- Born: Lakshmi Nagaraj; 5 May 1988 (age 38)
- Origin: Chilkunda, Mysore, Karnataka, India
- Genres: Filmi, Carnatic Music, Sugama Sangeetha
- Occupations: Singer, Vocalist
- Years active: 2003–present

Lakshmi Nagaraj (married name Lakshmi Nataraj) is an Indian classical vocalist and playback singer who primarily works in Kannada cinema. Besides singing, Lakshmi is also a television personality who has worked as a mentor in singing reality shows such as Sa Re Ga Ma Pa Kannada and Sa Re Ga Ma Pa Championship. She, and her younger sister Indu Nagaraj are popularly known as Chilkunda Sisters named after their hometown Chilkunda in Mysore district of Karnataka.

Prior to her career in singing, Lakshmi has been a contestant in popular singing talent shows such as Ede Thumbi Haaduvenu in 2005 and Confident Star Singer in 2009 and emerged as the title winner. She is the recipient of a Karnataka State Film Award for the song "Omkara" from the film Aptharakshaka (2010). She has received many State and private awards, including the "Aryabhatta Award" in 2009, for her achievements in Carnatic music.

== Life and career ==
Lakshmi was born on 5 May 1988 in a family of Carnatic classical personalities in Chilkunda town of Mysore district in Karnataka. Her father, C. A. Nagaraj, is a noted vocalist and flautist while her mother, H. S. Radha is a vocalist. Her younger sister Indu Nagaraj is also a classical and playback singer. Both of sisters were trained in classical music by their grandmother C. S. Sathya Lakshmi. At 7, Lakshmi gave her first concert in 1995 in Gundlupet along with her sister who was 5. The sisters have performed at various venues including the Darbar Hall of Mysore Palace during the Dasara celebrations. Lakshmi has been 'B' high grade artiste at All India Radio. She is married to Nataraj and currently resides in Bangalore.

Lakshmi was introduced to film playback singing through the film Partha in 2003. Since then, she has recorded songs for various films including Maurya (2004), Manasaare (2009), Ghauttham (2009) and Aptharakshaka (2010). For the latter, she went on to win several awards including the Karnataka State Film Award for her performance in the song "Omkara". She has recorded songs for various music directors including Hamsalekha, Gurukiran, Arjun Janya, Mano Murthy, B. Ajaneesh Lokanath, Veer Samarth and others.

== Discography ==
This is a partial list of notable films of Lakshmi Nataraj.

Year	Film	Title	Composer	Co-singer(s)	Notes
2003	Partha	"Sona Sona"	Gurukiran	Gurukiran	
2007	Meera Madhava Raghava	"Olle Time Banthamma"	Hamsalekha	Indu Nagaraj, Hemanth, Supriya Acharya	
2008	Manasaare	"Naanu Manasaare"	Mano Murthy	Vikas Vasishta	
2008	Nee Tata Naa Birla	"Sakhi Sakhi"	Gurukiran		
2009	Ghauttham	"Yaara Magalu Ivalu"	Gurukiran	Gurukiran	
2010	Aptharakshaka	"Omkara"	Gurukiran		
2011	Taare	"Chandira Thandu Kodale"	C. R. Bobby		
2013	Nenapinangala	"Mella Mella Nanndage"	C. R. Bobby		
2013	Advaitha	"Bisilina Besugeya"	Veer Samarth		
2013	Manasina Putadali	"Kadala Anchininda"	Rajnarayan Das		
2014	Software Ganda	"Saniha Saniha"	Veer Samarth	Rajesh Krishnan	
2014	Kalyanamasthu	"Appanu Kattida"	Raj Manohar	Chethan Sosca	
2014	Nan Life Alli	"Jinu Jinugo Maleyali"	B. Ajaneesh Lokanath	Shreeram Narayan	
2017	Jaali Baaru Matthu Poli Hudugaru	"Suride Geleya"	Veer Samarth	Chethan Gandharva	
2017	Jaali Baaru Matthu Poli Hudugaru	"Poosi Hodedu"	Veer Samarth	Chethan Gandharva	

== Television ==
Year	Television	Role	Notes
2021-2022	Sa Re Ga Ma Pa Championship	Mentor	

== Awards & Recognition ==
- 2002 - Nithyotsava Competitions - MSIL Gaayaki Award
- 2002 - Kishora Prathibhe Puraskara
- 2009 - Aryabhata National Award for achievements in Carnatic Music.
- 2010 - Karnataka State Film Award for Best Female Playback Singer - Aptharakshaka - "Omkara Abhinaya Veda"
- 2010 - Mirchi Music Award for Best Upcoming Female Singer - Aptharakshaka - "Omkara Abhinaya Veda"
- 2010 - Udaya Film Award for Best Female Playback Singer - Aptharakshaka - "Omkara Abhinaya Veda"
