= Porki Huccha Venkat =

- ಪೊರ್ಕಿ ಹುಚ್ಚ ವೆಂಕಟ್
- Directed by: Huccha Venkat
- Written by: Huccha Venkat
- Produced by: Huccha Venkat
- Starring: Huccha Venkat
- Music by: Satish
- Production company: Sri Sankashtahara Ganapathi Cine Pictures
- Release date: 28 April 2017
- Country: India
- Language: Kannada

Porki Huccha Venkat (transl. Rogue Huccha Venkat) is a 2017 Indian Kannada drama film directed by Huccha Venkat starring himself in the lead role. The film is a sequel to Huccha Venkat (2014), and it was released to negative reviews.

== Synopsis ==
Huccha Venkat stars his sene (transl. army) with goals of women's emancipation and helping the needy. Apart from this, Venkat also intervenes with politics and falls in love. The film is partially biographical and partially fictional.

== Cast ==
- Huccha Venkat as himself
- Rachana
- Soumya
- Jai Jagadish
- Shylashri

== Soundtrack ==
Music composer Satish Babu developed the score and soundtrack. The lyrics were written by Huccha Venkat.

Porki Huccha Venkat

Soundtrack album by Satish Babu
- Released: February 2016
- Genre: Feature film soundtrack
- Label: Anand Audio

Singles from Porki Huccha Venkat
- 1. "Kaveri" Released: 31 December 2015

No.	Title	Lyrics	Singer(s)	Length
1.	"Kaveri Ninna Madilalli"	Huccha Venkat	Huccha Venkat
2.	"Baalu Ondu Golu"	Huccha Venkat	Anuradha Bhat
3.	"Kannugale"	Huccha Venkat	Rajesh Krishnan
4.	"Kopa Bandre"	Huccha Venkat	Rajesh Krishnan
5.	"Thayiya Haalu"	Huccha Venkat	Rajesh Krishnan
6.	"Huccha Venkat Naanu"	Huccha Venkat	Rajesh Krishnan
Total length:				30.53

== Release and reception ==
The film had a low audience turnout.

Shyam Prasad S of Bangalore Mirror rated the film 1.5/5 and wrote, "In reality, the confusion is between whether to kill the audience or the characters". Sunayana Suresh of The Times of India rated the film 1/5 stars and wrote, "One would rather watch the Rahul Gandhi interview on women's upliftment instead for more entertainment".
