= Sharath =

Sharath may refer to:

- Sharreth (born 1969), Indian music director primarily in Malayalam, but also in Hindi, Tamil and Telugu, cinema
- Sharath (actor) (born 1989), Indian film actor, TV anchor and dancer who works in Kannada cinema.
- R. Sharath Jois (1971-2024), Indian yoga teacher, practitioner and lineage holder of Ashtanga (vinyasa) yoga
