= Partha (film) =

- VCD cover
- Directed by: Om Prakash Rao
- Written by: M. S. Ramesh (dialogues)
- Screenplay by: Om Prakash Rao
- Produced by: H. R. Rajashekar; Sudha Umesh Kadur
- Starring: Sudeep; Hardeep
- Cinematography: Anaji Nagaraj
- Edited by: S. Manohar
- Music by: Gurukiran
- Release date: 28 November 2003
- Running time: 147 minutes
- Country: India
- Language: Kannada

Partha is a 2003 Indian Kannada-language romance-action drama film directed by Om Prakash Rao featuring Sudeep and Hardeep in the lead roles. Partha was released on 28 November 2003 and was a commercial failure.

== Plot ==
Partha (Sudeep), a smart and dashing guy comes to Bangalore for his studies. He stays with his elder brother, sister-in-law & his nephew. His brother is not friendly with him but he loves Partha. One day Partha falls in love with a girl whom he saw in a temple. He also sees that girl in a church and thinks that the girl might be a Christian. Finally he sees the girl in a mosque and thinks that the girl would be a Muslim, but she turns out to be a Hindu girl named Nirmala aka Nimmi (Hardeep) who is an engineering college student. Partha proposes his love towards her but she doesn't reciprocate. Partha loves her so dearly but she doesn't show interest in love and tells Partha to stop following her again. Partha again spots her in a bus stop where some local goons chase Partha. Partha thrashed all the goons and asks Nirmala why they are behind him.

Nirmala tells that these local goons are led by a local don named Balram who has a close relation with Nimmi. After knowing this incident Balram goes to Partha's house to finish him. He tortured Partha's brother and the family. But Partha goes to Balram's house and phoned him and threatens that if anything happens to his family he will take the lives of each and every one in Balram's family. Balram leaved everyone in Partha's house and came to his house where Partha didn't do anything to his family. One day Nimmi's friend came to see Partha to tell about Nimmi. Nimmi is a college going girl who is living in peace until she is spotted by a senior named Krishna alias Kitti (Ayyappa.P.Sharma), Balram's younger brother who is obsessed with her. Kitti meets Nimmi and states that he has a desire to marry her. But Nimmi tells that she is not interested in marriage. Kitti warns her that if he needs anything he will surely gain it. One day Kitti slaps a student for talking with Nimmi. A student slapped Nimmi for complaining to the professor. After knowing about this incident, enraged Kitti chopped his hand which shocked every students in the college including Nimmi. Kitti warns everybody that Nimmi belongs to him and if anyone try to hurt her he will surely punish them. Now he is in jail for murder attempt.

Partha should be aware of Kitti that he can get bail at anytime and kill Partha for loving her. Knowing about Kitti, Partha wants to win her heart at any cost. Partha tells his love towards Nimmi and states that he loves her sincerely. Nimmi also starts to love him. Kitti is bailed and released by his brother. He goes to Nirmala's house to arrange a marriage with Nimmi on the next day to keep away Partha from her. Kitti goes to Partha's home and warns his family that if he again interfere in Nimmi's matters he surely kill him. Enraged Partha goes to Kitti's house and challenges to Balram that he will save Nimmi before their marriage. Kitti brutally thrashed Partha and throw away him in a drainage. On the occasion of their marriage, Partha comes and tharshes all the goons including Kitti and Balram where the duo brothers hit Partha brutally. Furious Partha beats them and tells to Balram "no one can live peacefully including your family members if you are labelled as Rowdy or Goonda, which will remain forever". Both Balram and Kitti feels guilt ridden from Partha's words and they leaves Nimmi to live with Partha.

== Cast ==
- Sudeep as Partha
- Hardeep as Nirmala "Nimmi"
- Dr Vijay
- Geetha S Rao as Partha's sister-in-law
- Siddartha
- B. V. Radha as Parvathi (Partha's mother)
- Rajashekhar Kotian as Balaram, Kitti's elder brother and a local don
- Shree Ganesh as Partha's nephew
- Bullet Prakash as Partha's friend

Uncredited

- Anupama Kumar as Anu
- Ravi Srivatsa as Goonda
- Ayyappa P. Sharma as Krishna alias Kitti

== Production ==
The film began production in December 2002 and marked the second collaboration of Sudeep and Om Prakash Rao after Huchcha (2001). Model Hardeep from Mumbai and Anupama Kumar made their debut with this film. This film's plot was adapted from Tamil movie Run (2002) and also had made some changes in this story for the taste of Kannada audience. The film is based on a true event that happened in Ramanagara. A bullock cart race involving 250 bullock carts was shot in Yenagi. In an interview with Deccan Herald, director Rao gave some plot details of the film. He said, "Two rowdy brothers fall for a beautiful girl and much against the girl's wishes the younger brother marries her. That is when Partha enters the scene. Feeling sorry for the girl's plight he takes it upon himself to teach the rowdy brothers a lesson and save the girl from the unhappy marriage she's forcibly in." When asked if the titular character has anything to do with his namesake Arjuna from the Hindu epic Mahabharata, he stated, "Well! It's for you to decide."

== Soundtrack ==
Partha

Soundtrack album by Gurukiran
- Released: 17 September 2003
- Genre: Feature film soundtrack
- Length: 24:27
- Language: Kannada
- Label: Ashwini Recording Company
- Producer: Gurukiran

Gurukiran chronology
Abhi (2003)	Partha (2003)	Gokarna (2003)
External audio
- Official Audio Jukebox on YouTube

The film features background score and soundtrack composed by Gurukiran and lyrics by Kaviraj and V. Nagendra Prasad.

No.	Song title	Singers	Lyrics
1	"O Nalle"	Hariharan	Kaviraj
2	"Sankranthi"	Shankar Mahadevan, Malgudi Subha	V. Nagendra Prasad
3	"Ee Preethi"	Rajesh Krishnan	Kaviraj
4	"Pyar De"	Mano, Shamitha Malnad, Gurukiran	Kaviraj
5	"Sona Sona"	Gurukiran, Lakshmi Nataraj	Kaviraj

== Reception ==
A critic from indiainfo wrote that "The drawbacks of this film is that at points the film has been stretched unnecessarily, otherwise this film is a okay one and is good to watch once". A critic from Deccan Herald called the film an "action packed thriller".
