= Sa Re Ga Ma Pa Championship =

Indian singing talent competition TV show

- Genre: Reality Musical
- Directed by: Bhaski
- Presented by: Anushree
- Judges: Hamsalekha; Vijay Prakash; Arjun Janya
- Country of origin: India
- Original language: Kannada
- No. of seasons: 18th
- No. of episodes: 54

Production
- Production locations: Bengaluru, Karnataka, India
- Camera setup: Multi-camera
- Running time: 90 minutes

Original release
- Network: Zee Kannada
- Release: 18 September 2021 – 26 February 2022

Related
- Sa Re Ga Ma Pa Kannada

Sa Re Ga Ma Pa Championship is an Indian Kannada language musical/singing reality television show aired on Zee Kannada. It is the 18th season of Sa Re Ga Ma Pa Kannada. It premiered from 18 September 2021.

== Format ==
The show aired on 18 September 2021 with Anushree as the host. The show is judged by Hamsalekha, Vijay Prakash, Arjun Janya with six mentors, 36 contestants and 40 jury members. Each mentor had six contestants in their team.

== Mentors ==
- Hemanth Kumar
- Nanditha
- Dr Suchethan Rangaswamy
- Indu Nagaraj
- Anuradha Bhat
- Lakshmi Nagaraj

== Teams ==
List of mentors and contestants

Winners Team
Runner up Team
2nd runner up Team

| Mentors | Contestants | | | | | |
|---|---|---|---|---|---|---|
| Hemanth | Kambada; Rangaya | Vasushree | Hanumantha | Vijeth | Srinidhi; Shashri | Keerthana |
| Nanditha | Pruthvi; Bhat | Rajath; Hegde | Supriya; Joshi | Keerthan; Holla | Chenappa | Suhana; Saiyad |
| Suchethan | Gnanesha | Priya | Sharadhi; Patil | Ashwin; Sharma | Asha bhat | Madvesha Bharadvaj |
| Indu Nagaraj | Gagan | Supreeth | Akhila; Pajimannu | Sunil | Sakshi; Kalur | Anvitha |
| Anuradha Bhat | Sri; Harsha | Ankitha; Kundu | Darshan | Mehaboob | Abhisyanth | Varna; Chavan |
| Lakshmi Nagaraj | Sadhvini; Koppa | Neha; Shastri | Sri Ram; Kasar | Rajath; Maiya | Dattaprasad | Ramya |

- Special Mention Awards
- Performer of the Season - Sri Harsha
- Entertainer of the Season - Kambada Rangayya

== Special Guests ==
Special guest appearances
| Guest(s) | Reason | Episode | Notes |
|---|---|---|---|
| Shiva Rajkumar | To promote his movie Bhajarangi 2 | 16–17 October | |
| Ramesh Aravind, Rachita Ram, Shamna Kasim | To promote their movie 100 | 20 November | |
| Ravichandran | Reunion of Hamsaleka and Ravichandran | 10-11 December | |
| Anil Kumble | Special Guest | 25 December | |
| Gurukiran | Special Guest | 22 January 2022 | |
