= Okkade =

- Directed by: Chandra Mahesh
- Screenplay by: Chandra Mahesh
- Story by: Geeta Arts Pictures Unit
- Produced by: K. Mahendra
- Starring: Srihari; Santhoshi; Mukesh Rishi
- Cinematography: Adusumalli Vijay Kumar
- Edited by: Murali Ramayya
- Music by: Vandemataram Srinivas
- Production company: Geeta Art Pictures
- Release date: 1 September 2005
- Running time: 137 minutes
- Country: India

Okkade (transl. One) is a 2005 Indian Telugu-language action film directed by Chandra Mahesh and starring Srihari and Santhoshi. The film was released to mixed-to-positive reviews.

== Cast ==
- Srihari as SP Yugandhar
- Santhoshi as Kanaka Durga
- Mukesh Rishi as Subbarayudu
- Jeeva as Chowdappa
- L. B. Sriram
- Bharath Raju as Chinnappa
- Sivaji Raja as Sivaji
- Jaya Prakash Reddy as Subbarayudu's elder brother
- Dharmavarapu Subramanyam
- Nagendra Babu as Home Minister
- Prudhviraj as Police Officer
- Telangana Shakuntala
- Surekha Vani as Sivaji's wife
- Sarika Ramachandra Rao as Lawyer
- Rajitha

== Production ==
The film began production in April 2005 and the title was revealed in June 2005.

== Reception ==
Jeevi of Idlebrain.com rated the film three out of five and wrote that "On a whole, Okkade makes an average flick for a normal movie lover and a satisfactory one for the masses who enjoy Srihari's action flicks". A critic from Full Hyderabad wrote that "On the whole, a movie that can be watched by all Srihari and action movie fans. It’s a must-watch for cops too. With all the philosophy disseminated by the hero, even I wanted to don those khakis". On the contrary, a critic from Rediff.com gave the film a negative review and wrote that "The director rehashes most of the Hindi film Kurukshetra, and further incorporates scenes from a few hit films to spoil the broth. Another drawback of the film is poor screenplay weaved in with clichéd scenes and stale dialogues. An apology for a comedy, this film sorely tests the audience's patience".
