= Bigg Boss Kannada season 6 =

Season of the television series Bigg Boss Kannada

Bigg Boss Kannada
- Season 6
- Season 6 eye logo
- Hosted by: Sudeep
- No. of days: 100
- No. of housemates: 20
- Winner: Shashi Kumar
- Runner-up: Naveen Sajju

Release
- Original network: Colors Super; Colors Kannada HD
- Original release: 21 October 2018 – 27 January 2019

Series chronology
- ← Previous; Season 5 Next → Season 7

Bigg Boss 6 is the sixth season of the Kannada-language version of Indian reality television series Bigg Boss premiered on 21 October 2018 at 6 p.m. Sudeep was the host of the show. The auditions for commoners was launched through the Voot platform in July 2018. This was the first season in Bigg Boss Kannada to feature a transgender contestant. The show was telecasted every day on Colors Super and Colors Kannada HD channels at 8 p.m. IST. Nagendra Bhat was the writer for this season.

== Summary ==
Along with the usual celebrity contestants, the housemates of this season include contestants selected through an online audition process. The total of eighteen housemates includes nine celebrities and nine commoners. (The following list of contestants is according to the contestants entering the house.) On Day 54 two more Housemates entered as wild card entries bringing the total number of Housemates to twenty.

== Housemates status ==
Sr	Housemate	Day entered	Day exited	Housemates Status
1	Shashi	Day 1	Day 100	Winner
2	Naveen	Day 1	Day 100	1st runner-up
3	Kavitha	Day 1	Day 100	2nd runner-up
4	Andrew	Day 1	Day 99	3rd runner-up
5	Rashmi	Day 1	Day 99	4th runner-up
6	Dhanraj	Day 1	Day 92	Evicted
7	Rakesh	Day 1	Day 91	Evicted
8	Akshatha	Day 1	Day 84	Evicted
9	Muruli	Day 1	Day 77	Evicted
10	Jeevitha	Day 54	Day 77	Evicted
11	Megha	Day 54	Day 70	Evicted
12	Jayashree	Day 1	Day 63	Evicted
13	Naina	Day 1	Day 56	Evicted
14	Sonu	Day 1	Day 49	Evicted
15	Anand	Day 1	Day 42	Evicted
16	Ravi	Day 1	Day 35	Evicted
17	Adam	Day 1	Day 28	Evicted
18	Sneha	Day 1	Day 21	Evicted
19	Reema	Day 1	Day 14	Evicted
20	Rakshitha	Day 1	Day 7	Evicted

== Housemates ==
=== Original entrants ===
- Shashi Kumar – Agriculturist.
- Adam Pasha – Drag queen.
- Kavitha Gowda – Actress.
- Rapid Rashmi – RJ.
- Meghashree – Actress.
- Dhanraj – Voice over artist.
- Rakesh – RJ.
- Akshatha Pandavapura – Actress.
- Jeevitha Sagar – Actress.
- Andrew Jaypaul – Actor.
- Muruli Dabbi – Presenter.
- Jayashree Raj – Actress.
- Naveen Sajju – Singer.
- Anand Malgatti – Bus conductor.
- Rakshitha Rai – Sportswomen.
- Sonu Patil – Actress.
- Ravi AV – Actor and bodybuilder.
- Reema Dias – IT professional.
- Sneha Acharya – Dancer.

=== House guests ===
- Niveditha Gowda, a Housemate from season 5, entered the House as a guest on Day 54 along with the wild card entries and left on Day 60. During her time in the House she was required to participate in the Week 9 nomination process.
- Krishi Thapanda, a Housemate from season 5, entered the Secret House as a guest on Day 85 as a part of a Twist.
- Keerthi Shankaraghatta (Kirik Keerthi), the Runner-up of season 4, entered the Secret House as a guest on Day 85 as a part of a Twist.
- Sanjana Chidanand, a Housemate from season 4, entered the Secret House as a guest on Day 85 as a part of a Twist.
- Pratham, the Winner of season 4, entered the Secret House as a guest on Day 85 as a part of a Twist.
- Sameer Acharya, a Housemate from season 5, entered the Secret House as a guest on Day 85 as a part of a Twist.
