= 3 Dots =

- Poster
- Directed by: Sugeeth
- Written by: Rajesh Raghavan
- Produced by: Satish B. Satish; Sugeeth
- Starring: Kunchacko Boban; Biju Menon; Prathap K. Pothan; Narain
- Cinematography: Faizal Ali
- Edited by: V. Sajan
- Music by: Vidyasagar
- Production company: Ordinary Films
- Release date: 22 March 2013
- Running time: 160 minutes
- Country: India
- Language: Malayalam

3 Dots is a 2013 Indian Malayalam language comedy thriller film written by Rajesh Raghavan and directed by Sugeeth. The film stars Kunchacko Boban, Biju Menon and Prathap K. Pothan with Narain, Krishna Kumar, Janani Iyer, Sreedhanya and Anjana Menon in supporting roles. 3 Dots was produced by Satish B Satish and Sugeeth under the banner of Ordinary Films.

== Plot ==
Vishnu, Pappan and Louis are three ex-convicts who live together at Pappan's abode, trying to pick up from where they had let their lives off before being jailed. After many unsuccessful efforts to find employment, they appeal to Dr. Isaac, who was a counsellor in the prison. He suggests that they consider some form of self-employment and he will support them. Vishnu converts Pappan's Omni into an ambulance. Pappan runs a playschool and Louis works for a driving school run by a neighbour, Grace, a widow. But Dr. Isaac has some other intentions in supporting them and this forms the crux of the story.

== Cast ==
- Kunchacko Boban as Vishnu
- Biju Menon as Louis
- Prathap K. Pothan as Padmakumar / Pappettan
- Narain as Dr. Isaac Samuel-The Main Antagonist
- Krishna Kumar as Mathew Paul
- Janani Iyer as Lakshmi
- Anjana Menon as Grace
- Sreedhanya as Beena Paul
- Vanitha Krishnachandran as Shobha
- Jaise Jose as Adv. Ravi Menon-The Secondary Antagonist
- Moideen Koya as News Reporter
- Dharmajan Bolgatty as Driving Student
- Sunil Sukhada as Person in Bar
- Niyas Backer as Manoharan

== Soundtrack ==
3 Dots

Soundtrack album by Vidyasagar
- Released: 2 March 2013
- Recorded: Varsha Vallaki Studios
- Genre: Feature film soundtrack
- Length: 19:56
- Language: Malayalam
- Label: Satyam Audios
- Producer: Vidyasagar

Vidyasagar chronology
Thappana (2012)	3 Dots (2013)	Thalaivan (2013)

S. No.	Song	Length	Singer(s)	Lyricist(s)	Picturization
1	"Enthinenthu"	04:31	Madhu Balakrishnan, Karthik & Tippu	V. R. Santhosh	
2	"Kannil Kannil"	04:15	Karthik, Madhu Balakrishnan & Sujatha	V. R. Santhosh	
3	"Kunnirangi"	04:36	Nivas	Rajeev Nair	
4	"Why is the Moon So Bright" (Mele Mayum)	04:52	Karthik, Madhu Balakrishnan, S.P.B. & Tippu	Rajeev Nair	
5	"Othupidichal"	02:18	Franko	Rajeev Nair	

== Reception ==
A critic from The Times of India wrote that "A story of three convicts out of prison to transform their lives, it could have been a much more enjoyable film, had Sugeeth done away with some of the stereotyped caricatures or some mushy sequences". A critic from Rediff.com wrote that "3 Dots held a lot of promise coming from the winning team of Ordinary, but this film turns out to be less than ordinary".
