= Sa Re Ga Ma Pa Kannada =

Kannada musical reality show

- Genre: Reality Musical
- Presented by: Anushree
- Judges: Hamsalekha; Vijay Prakash; Rajesh Krishnan; Arjun Janya
- Country of origin: India
- Original language: Kannada
- No. of seasons: 21

Production
- Producer: Zee Studios
- Production locations: Bangalore, Karnataka, India
- Camera setup: Multi-camera
- Running time: 90 minutes

Original release
- Network: Zee Kannada
- Release: 2006 – present

Related
- Sa Re Ga Ma Pa Championship

Sa Re Ga Ma Pa Kannada is a Kannada version of the Indian musical reality television show Sa Re Ga Ma Pa. The presenter is Anushree, and the judges are Hamsalekha, Vijay Prakash, and Arjun Janya.

== Season overview ==
Year	Season	Winner	Runner-up 1	Runner-up 2	Anchor	Judges
2006	1	VASU	Sowmya Shree		Rajesh Krishnan / MD Pallavi	S. Janaki (Finale Episode)
2006-07	2 - Women's Special				Vijay Prakash	
	3	Ohileshwari			MD Pallavi	Rajesh Krishnan
	Little Champs - 4	Manojavam Athreya			Archana Udupa	Rajesh Krishnan Vani Jayaram (Finale Episode)
	Little Champs - 5 Champion of Champions	Ashwin Sharma	Manojavam Athreya		Archana Udupa	Rajesh Krishnan S. Janaki
2009	Saregama Challenge - 6	Nakul Abhyankar			Harshika Poonacha	Rajesh Krishnan Hemanth Nanditha Archana Udupa
2009-10	Little Champs - 7	Yogeendra H, Sanjana	Sachin, Aishwarya Rangarajan		M. D. Pallavi	Rajesh Krishnan
2010-11	Little Champs - 8	Akhila	Rajat Hegde	Kiran	Nakul Vinayak Joshi	Raghu Dixit M. D. Pallavi Gurukiran Usha Uthup (Finale Episode)
2012	Little Champs - 9	Gagan			Varsha	Vijay Prakash Sowmya Raoh Usha Uthup (Finale Episode)
2015	Little Champs - 10	Supriya Joshi	Ankita Kundu	Niharika	Anushree	Hamsalekha; Vijay Prakash; Rajesh Krishnan; Arjun Janya
2016	11	Channappa Huddar	Shreeram R Kasar	Aishwarya Rangarajan	Anushree	Hamsalekha; Vijay Prakash; Rajesh Krishnan; Arjun Janya
2016-17	Little Champs - 12	Anvitha	Shreekar	Darshan	Anushree	Hamsalekha; Vijay Prakash; Rajesh Krishnan; Arjun Janya
2017	13	Sunil	Mehaboob sab	Shree Harsha	Anushree	Hamsalekha; Vijay Prakash; Rajesh Krishnan; Arjun Janya
2017-18	Little Champs - 14	Vishwaprasad	Gnanesh and Keerthana		Anushree	Hamsalekha; Vijay Prakash; Rajesh Krishnan; Arjun Janya
2018	15	Keertan Holla	Hanumanta	Sadhvini Koppa	Anushree	Hamsalekha; Vijay Prakash; Rajesh Krishnan; Arjun Janya
2019	Little Champs - 16	Omkar Pattar	Gurukiran Hegde	Sunad M Prasad	Anushree	Hamsalekha; Vijay Prakash; Rajesh Krishnan; Arjun Janya
2020	17	Shreenidhi Shashtri	Ashwin Sharma	Kambada Rangayya	Anushree	Hamsalekha; Vijay Prakash; Rajesh Krishnan; Arjun Janya
2021	18; Championship	Team Nandita	Team Indu Nagaraj	Team Anuradha	Anushree	Hamsalekha; Vijay Prakash; Rajesh Krishnan; Arjun Janya
2022	Little Champs - 19	Pragati Badiger	Shivani	Tanushree	Anushree	Hamsalekha; Vijay Prakash; Rajesh Krishnan; Arjun Janya
2023	20	Darshan	Ramesh Lambani	Dr. Shravya S Rao	Anushree	Hamsalekha; Vijay Prakash; Rajesh Krishnan; Arjun Janya
2024-2025	21	Shivani Shivdas Swami	Aradhya Rao	Rashmi Dharmendra	Anushree	Rajesh Krishnan; Vijay Prakash; Arjun Janya

== See also ==
- Sa Re Ga Ma Pa Bangla
- Sa Re Ga Ma Pa Hindi
- Sa Re Ga Ma Pa Keralam
- Sa Re Ga Ma Pa Marathi
- Sa Re Ga Ma Pa Tamil
- Sa Re Ga Ma Pa Telugu
