= Neeli (film) =

2018 Indian film

- Theatrical release poster
- Directed by: Althaf Rahman
- Screenplay by: Muneer Mohammadunni, Riyas Marath
- Produced by: T. A. Sundar Menon
- Starring: Anoop Menon; Mamta Mohandas; Baby Mia
- Cinematography: Manoj Pillai
- Edited by: V. Sajan
- Music by: Sharreth
- Production company: Sun Ads And Film Productions
- Release date: 11 August 2018
- Country: India
- Language: Malayalam

Neeli is a 2018 Indian Malayalam-language horror film written and directed by Althaf Rahman. The film stars Anoop Menon, Mamta Mohandas, and Baby Mya. T. A. Sundar Menon produced it under the banner of Sun Ads and Film Productions.

== Plot ==
The film's protagonist, Lekshmi, is a speech therapist and a single mother. She and her daughter return to their ancestral village in Kalingadu after her husband passes away. One night, Lakshmi is attacked, and her daughter is kidnapped. The rest of the tale is the pursuit of the daughter. After obvious efforts to track down her daughter fail, Lekshmi seeks the help of a supernatural power in the village, Neeli.

A paranormal investigator, Reny, enters the fray with two good-hearted thieves, played by Baburaj and Sreekumar, and a photographer essayed by Zinil Zainudeen. The trio takes care of the comedic devices in the film. Not that it needed many, especially with Reny's gizmos that could track any energy based on its smell.

== Cast ==
- Anoop Menon as Reni
- Mamta Mohandas as Lakshmi
- Babu Raj as Prabhakaran
- Baby Miya as Thara
- S. P. Sreekumar as Jalal
- Zinil Zainuddin
- Rahul Madhav as Alex Mathew
- Anjana Menon as spiritual lady
- Swasika in a dance performance
- Megha Mathew as Zareena
- Dhruv as Chemmadan Raghavan
- Kukku
- Nityasri
- Balaji
- Megha Nair

== Release ==
Neeli was released in India on 11 August 2018.
