= Preyasi Raave =

- Directed by: Chandra Mahesh
- Written by: Posani Krishna Murali
- Screenplay by: Posani Krishna Murali
- Produced by: D. Ramanaidu
- Starring: Srikanth; Raasi; Babloo Prithiveeraj; Sanghavi; Ananda Vardhan
- Music by: M. M. Srilekha
- Production company: Suresh Productions
- Release date: 19 November 1999
- Country: India
- Language: Telugu

Preyasi Raave is a 1999 Telugu language film directed by Chandra Mahesh and produced by D. Ramanaidu. The film stars Srikanth, Raasi, Babloo Prithiveeraj and Sanghavi.The film was a blockbuster.

== Plot ==
Vamsi (Srikanth) is a hotelier who falls in love with Mahalakshmi (Raasi). She too reciprocates his feelings and eventually seeks the permission of her father (Chalapathi Rao). Her father however demands Vamsi to give 15 lakhs as dowry. Vamsi goes abroad and earns the money but comes back to find out that Mahalakshmi’s father had cheated him and got her forcibly married to Sriram (Babloo Prithiveeraj), son of a Zamindar. Mahalakshmi too eventually starts loving Sriram. Vamsi tries to win her back but his attempts go in vain. The rest of the story involves whether Vamsi will win back Mahalakshmi.

== Cast ==
- Srikanth as Vamsi
- Raasi as Mahalakshmi
- Babloo Prithiveeraj as Sriram, Mahalakshmi's husband
- Sanghavi as Soni Maganti
- Brahmanandam as Dr. Gopal MS
- Ali as Ali, Vamsi's friend
- Chalapathi Rao as Mahalakshmi's father
- Annapurna as Mahalakshmi's mother
- M. S. Narayana as Dr. Appa Rao
- AVS as Dr. Janardan
- Srihari as AV Rao, Sriram's step-brother
- Rama Prabha as Anasuya, Gopal's aunt
- Sivaji Raja as Vamsi's brother-in-law
- Ramjagan
- Shanoor Sana as Pavani, Vamsi's sister
- Raghunatha Reddy as Sriram's father
- Dharmavarapu Subramanyam as Doctor
- Nagendra Babu as Doctor
- Delhi Rajeshwari as Nagendra Babu's wife (Cameo appearance)
- D. Ramanaidu as Mr. Naidu, Vamsi's boss
- Aanand Vardhan as Nani, Vamsi's nephew
- Rajitha as Anasuya's daughter
- Gundu Hanumantha Rao as a patient

== Production ==
During the making of the film, D. Ramanaidu told Srikanth to change his hairstyle but he did not follow suit.

== Soundtrack ==
The music was composed by M. M. Srilekha.

No.	Song	Singers
1	"Menakavo Priyakanukavo "	S. P. Balasubrahmanyam, M. M. Srilekha
2	"Nekoosam Nekoosam "	S. P. Balasubrahmanyam, Chithra
3	"Premante Nedu Thelisinadi "	S. P. Balasubrahmanyam, Chithra
4	"Oh Prema "	S. P. Balasubrahmanyam, Chithra
5	"Tenchukunte Thegipothunda "	S. P. Balasubrahmanyam
6	"Waiting To Kiss You "	S. P. Balasubrahmanyam, Sujatha
7	"We Have Freedom "	M. M. Srilekha

== Reception ==
Andhra Today wrote "Director Chandra Mahesh's deft handling of scenes expressing love between Vamsi and Mahalakshmi are quite entertaining. Brahmanandam's comedy is worthy of mention. All the actors and actresses do live up to their roles. Music by Sri Lekha with good score and lyrics feature well picturized songs. The songs may even top the charts. Photography by Jairam is superb. On the whole, Krishna Murali's dialogues surpass and dominate the efforts of all other departments of the film". Telugu Cinema felt "second half drags. Some scenes can be chopped off. Similarities are there of ANR’s Amarajeevi" but praised Posani's dialogues.
