= Mental Manja =

- Directed by: Sai Sagar
- Written by: Sai Sagar
- Produced by: Cheluvali Narayan
- Starring: Arjun; Sheethal
- Cinematography: Ramana
- Edited by: Rajashekar Reddy
- Music by: Sai Sagar
- Production company: Sri Eshwar Motion Pictures
- Release date: 5 August 2005
- Running time: 141 min.
- Country: India
- Language: Kannada

Mental Manja is a 2005 Indian Kannada-language romance film directed by Sai Sagar. The film stars newcomers Arjun and Sheethal. The story of this movie shares many similarities to 1995 Kannada movie Om with slight changes. The film was a box office success and ran for fifty days. Arjun earned the name Mental Star from this film. A film titled Mental Manja 2 was announced, but it is not a sequel to this film.

== Cast ==
- Arjun as Manjunath alias Manja/Mental Manja
- Sheethal as Priya
- Ramesh Bhat
- Ashalatha
- Girija Lokesh
- Sathyajith
- Vijay as Angry man
- M. D. Kaushik
- Tennis Krishna
- Mandeep Roy
- Vaijanath Biradar
- Sai Sagar
- Huccha Venkat

== Production ==
The film had a tagline saying that it was only for smart people.

== Soundtrack ==
Music composer Sai Sagar developed the score and soundtrack. The lyrics were written by Sai Sagar. Lahari Music Company took the copyrights for this movie sound track. The song "Chembu Chembu" is based on "Hawa Hawa" by Pakistani singer Hasan Jahangir.

Mental Manja

Soundtrack album by Sai Sagar
- Released: July 2005
- Genre: Feature film soundtrack

No.	Title	Lyrics	Singer(s)	Length
1.	"Chembu Chembu"	Sai Sagar	Vishnu
2.	"Love Anno Touchali"	Sai Sagar	Ajay
3.	"Hoo Andre"	Sai Sagar	Hemanth Kumar
4.	"Mental Manja"	Sai Sagar	Ameed
5.	"Manja Naane Manja"	Sai Sagar	Sai Sagar
6.	"Kuluko Edeyalli"	Sai Sagar	Vishnu
7.	"Dialogue Midli"	Sai Sagar	Sai Sagar
8.	"Manja Naane Manja Them"	Sai Sagar	Sai Sagar

== Awards ==
Udaya Film Awards 2006

- Best Debut Actor - Arjun
