= Endendigu =

- Theatrical release poster
- Directed by: Imran Sardhariya
- Screenplay by: Jayatheertha; Imran Sardhariya
- Story by: Imran Sardariya
- Produced by: S. V. Babu
- Starring: Ajay Rao; Radhika Pandit
- Cinematography: Venkatesh Anguraj
- Edited by: Deepu S. Kumar
- Music by: V. Harikrishna
- Production company: S. V. Productions
- Distributed by: S. V. Films; Om Sai Release; Kumar Film Factory
- Release date: 1 May 2015
- Running time: 121 minutes
- Country: India
- Language: Kannada

Endendigu (transl. Forever and ever) is a 2015 Indian Kannada romantic thriller film written and directed by Imran Sardhariya. It stars Ajay Rao and Radhika Pandit in the lead roles, with supporting cast featuring Shanthamma, Ashok, Kalyani Raju, Pavitra Lokesh, Tabla Nani and H. G. Dattatreya.

The film tells the story of a newly wed couple, Jyothi (Pandit) and Krishna (Rao), who move to Sweden, where Jyoti gets precognitive dreams foreseeing Krishna's death, and her efforts to prevent it. Released on 1 May 2015, the film received positive to mixed reviews from critics, though the performance of Radhika Pandit was highlighted.

== Cast ==
- Ajay Rao as Krishna
- Radhika Pandit as Jyothi
- H. G. Dattatreya
- Ashok
- Cudavalli Chandrashekar
- Raveendranath
- Kalyani Raju
- Tabla Nani
- Sumithra
- Pavitra Lokesh
- Shanthamma
- B. Suresha
- Anmol (credited as Master Anmol)
- V. Harikrishna as himself (cameo in song "Friendu Maduve")
- Yogaraj Bhat as himself (cameo in song "Friendu Maduve")
- Dhananjay as himself (cameo in song "Friendu Maduve")
- Sadhu Kokila as himself (cameo in song "Friendu Maduve")
- P. Ravi Shankar as himself (cameo in song "Friendu Maduve")
- Arun Sagar as himself (cameo in song "Friendu Maduve")

== Production ==
Choreographer Imran Sardhariya made his debut with the film as a director, and Ajay Rao and Radhika Pandit were cast. Filming began in November 2013 in Sweden, where the song sequences were shot.

== Soundtrack ==
Endendigu

Soundtrack album by V. Harikrishna
- Released: 27 March 2015
- Genre: Feature film soundtrack
- Length: 20:42
- Label: D Beats
- Producer: V. Harikrishna

V. Harikrishna composed the film's background score and music for its soundtrack. It consists of five tracks.

Track listing
No.	Title	Lyrics	Singer(s)	Length
1.	"Ninnalle"	K. Kalyan	Sonu Nigam, Shreya Ghoshal	4:42
2.	"Iduvarege"	Yogaraj Bhat	Sonu Nigam	4:17
3.	"Friendu Maduve"	Yogaraj Bhat	V. Harikrishna	3:57
4.	"Kanna Kajal"	A. P. Arjun	Sonu Nigam, Anuradha Bhat	4:13
5.	"Endendigu"	K. Kalyan	Kartik	3:33
Total length:				20:42

== Reception ==
A. Sharadhaa of The New Indian Express wrote, "The film generates a little amount of adrenaline and takes a few unexpected turns while covering familiar territory. Though low on suspense, this film filled with imaginative death scenes offers a break from usual clichés". Shashi Prasad S. M. of the Deccan Chronicle rated the film 2.5/5 and wrote, "Despite the average debut, Imran has showcased his capabilities, for a promising career as a director". Kumar G. S. of The Times of India rated the film 3.5/5 stars and wrote, "A different story with commendable performance by leading actors, the directorial debut of choreographer Imran Sardaria offers a refreshing experience".
