= Shh Eccharike =

- Theatrical release poster
- Directed by: Nagaraj Kandagal
- Starring: Maruthi Soorya; Akshatha
- Cinematography: Ramesh Chabbenadu
- Edited by: Vinod B M
- Music by: Gautham Srivathsa
- Release date: 21 August 2015
- Country: India
- Language: Kannada

Shh Eccharike (transl. Shh Warning) is a 2015 Indian Kannada-language horror film written and directed by Nagaraj Kandagal. Starring Maruthi Soorya, Akshatha and Ajith, the film follows a family who move into a haunted house. It was theatrically released on August 21, 2015.

== Cast ==
- Maruthi Soorya as Manu
- Akshatha
- Ajith
- Baby Shreya
- Baby Riya
- Master Krish
- Jai Ganesh
- Stephen Arun Raj
- Priya
- Bharathi

== Reception ==
A Shardhaa from The New Indian Express wrote "Verdict: You will laugh the most when the end credits say, ‘to be continued’". A reviewer of Deccan Herald says "The only shocker Shh Echarike provides audiences is when the end credits roll by and .... to be continued looms large. A sequel, you wonder. So much for optimism and hope. For Shh Echarike is anything but a horror show it claims to be. God save!". Archana Nathan from The Hindu wrote "Shh… is a poor attempt at telling a story we have heard many times. And the horror of sitting through it is really not worth it. Come to think of it, it is rightly titled after all". Sunanya Suresh from The Times of India says "Honestly, one wonders why parents would push their kids to be a part of films, which they would be embarrassed of when they grow up. The girl playing the ghost looks like she is dressed as one of the Avatar tribe for Comic Con".
