= Chandra Mahesh =

Indian film director, producer and actor (born 1968)

- Working For Red Alert
- Born: Chandra Mahesh; 8 November 1968 (age 57); East Godavari, Andhra Pradesh
- Occupation: Director
- Years active: 1999–present
- Website: www.chandrramahes.com

Chandra Mahesh is an Indian film director who works in Telugu cinema.

== Career ==
Chandra Mahesh worked as an assistant director for Super Police (1993), Yamaleela (1994), Dharma Chakram (1996), Nayudugari Kutumbam (1996), Preminchukundam Raa (1997) and Sivayya (1998). He made his debut with Preyasi Raave (1999). Despite the film's success, he could not capitalise on it and for his next film Cheppalani Vundhi (2001) both Tarun and Venu Thottempudi were initially set to do the film before it went to Vadde Naveen.

He directed the trilingual film Red Alert in Kannada and Telugu and High Alert in Malayalam in 2015.

== Filmography ==
- 1999: Preyasi Raave
- 2001: Cheppalani Vundhi
- 2002: Joruga Husharuga
- 2002: Ayodhya Ramayya
- 2005: Okkade
- 2006: Hanumanthu
- 2010: Aalasyam Amrutam
- 2015: Red Alert / High Alert
