= Anjana Menon =

Indian actress

- Born: Angamaly, Kerala, India
- Occupation: Film actress
- Years active: 2011–present

Anjana Menon is an Indian actress who predominantly appears in Malayalam films. She made her debut in the 2011 Malayalam film Traffic.

== Career ==
Her film career began when she got a call from director Rajesh Pillai for Traffic (2011). Post Traffic, she got paired opposite Biju Menon in Sugeeth's 3 Dots and played the role of an independent widow. She also starred in the trilingual film Red Alert as a police officer.

== Filmography ==
Year	Title	Role	Language	Notes
2011	Traffic	Vyga	Malayalam	
2013	3 Dots	Grace	Malayalam	
2013	Black Ticket	Annmary	Malayalam	
2013	Police Maaman	Girly	Malayalam	
2015	Red Alert	DCP Bhuvaneswari	Kannada	Multilingual film
2015	High Alert	DCP Bhuvaneswari	Malayalam	Multilingual film
2015	Red Alert	DCP Bhuvaneswari	Telugu	Multilingual film
2017	1971: Beyond Borders	Military Nurse	Malayalam	
2017	Zacharia Pothen Jeevichirippundu	Shabnam	Malayalam	
2018	Neeli	Spiritual Lady	Malayalam	
2021	Meezan	Sulekha	Malayalam	
