= Sharath (actor) =

Indian film Actor, TV anchor and Dancer (born 1989)

- Born: 4 May 1989 (age 37); Banashankari, Bangalore, Karnataka
- Citizenship: Indian
- Education: Bangalore University, Bangalore
- Occupations: actor, Dancer, TV anchor
- Years active: 2013 – present

Sharath (Kannada: ಶರತ್) is an Indian actor, TV anchor and Dancer who works in Kannada cinema. In 2014, he won the reality show Life Super Guru.

== Early life ==
Sharath was born on 4 May 1989 in Banashankari, Bangalore as the youngest child of Suresh and H V Ramamani. He has an elder brother Bharath Kumar S. He did his schooling in Mother Teresa English high school Bangalore. He completed his Pre-university course from BNM PU College and RV PU college Bangalore. Sharath graduated with a B.Com. from PES University Bangalore.

== Career ==
Sharath started his career as a dance instructor with famous choreographer turned director Imran Sardhariya. He has performed live in more than 20 stage shows. Sharath soon put his first step into the glam world training the Sandalwood stars like Yash, Nenapirali Prem, Soundarya, Jayamala and many other big names in the industry.

His career turnaround came when in 2014, he won Life Super Guru a reality show that was screened on popular Kannada channel Zee Kannada. This took a wonderful turn in his career as he was chosen to be a lead anchor in a popular show Nam Deshad Kathe on Zee Kannada. This show is an attempt to discover many unknown places and untold stories of this vast sub-continent and also gave him an opportunity to travel across India. He was anchored many shows in Zee Kannada including Zee Kutumba Awards.

Sharath is making his debut as an actor with the film Uppu Huli Khaara, directed by Imran Sardhariya. The shoot started on 18 April 2016.

== Filmography ==
| No | Year | Title | Role | Language | Director | Notes |
|---|---|---|---|---|---|---|
| 1 | 2016 | Uppu Huli Khaara | Lead role | Kannada | Imran Sardhariya | Filming |

== Awards ==
| Year | Award | Category | Result |
|---|---|---|---|
| 2014 | Life Super Guru | Zee Kannada Reality Show | Won |

== Television career ==
| Year | Title | Channel | Notes |
|---|---|---|---|
| 2015 | Nam Deshad Kathe | Zee Kannada | |
| 2015 | Range Gowdru Maneyalli Ugadi Special Programme | Zee Kannada | |
| 2015 | Killing Verrappan Independence Day Special Program | Zee Kannada | |
| 2015 | Zee Kutumba Awards | Zee Kannada | |
