= Huccha Venkat =

Indian actor and filmmaker

- Born: Karnataka, India
- Occupations: Actor, producer, writer, singer
- Years active: 2005–present

Venkataram Laxman, also known by his stage name Huccha Venkat, is an Indian actor and filmmaker who works in Kannada cinema.

== Career ==
Venkat made his acting debut in a supporting role in the 2005 film Mental Manja and in Swathanthra Palya (2009), which he also directed. In Huccha Venkat (2014), which he also directed and produced, Venkat starred as the eponymous lead. The film received negative reviews.

Before the release of Huccha Venkat (2014), Venkat was an unknown actor but he became famous after media outlets released a viral video in which he identified Kannadigas not watching Huccha Venkat as the main reason for its failure on the day of its release. Following the incident and the film's re-release, Venkat has been a regular guest on television talk-shows such as Bengaluru Benne Dose and Divided. He often appears on news channels while drunk. In October 2015, he appeared as a contestant on the reality television series Bigg Boss Kannada 3, which aired on Colors Kannada. Venkat clashed with the show's other participants, mainly because he said the female contestants were dressing inappropriately; he also fought with Pratham after the show ended. This incident led to his eviction from the house after he assaulted another contestant, Ravi Mooruru. Venkat also challenged Sudeep, and later withdrew the challenge and refused to talk to Sudeep again.

Venkat's fans have created an Android app called Huccha Venkat that provides updates about Venkat. Senior journalist Ganesh Kasargod has written a book titled Huchcha Venkat ... Huchchu Manasina nooru mukhagalu, which was released in January 2016.

== Other work ==
In 2018, Venkat contested the Assembly elections for the seat of Rajarajeshwari Nagar, Bengaluru, as an independent candidate. He failed to win the seat.

== Filmography ==
Year	Title	Credited as					Notes
Year	Title	Writer	Actor	Director	Producer	Singer	Notes
2005	Mental Manja	No	Yes	No	No	No	
2009	Swathanthra Palya	Yes	Yes	Yes	No	No	
2014	Huccha Venkat	Yes	Yes	Yes	Yes	Yes	
2016	Parapancha	No	Yes	No	No	Yes	Cameo appearance in the song "Huttida Ooranu"
2017	Porki Huccha Venkat	Yes	Yes	Yes	Yes	Yes	
2018	Thikla Huccha Venkat	Yes	Yes	Yes	Yes	Yes	
2018	Dictator Huccha Venkat	Yes	Yes	Yes	Yes	Yes	
2018	Durahankari Huccha Venkat	Yes	Yes	Yes	Yes	Yes	
2018	O Premave	No	Yes	No	No	No	Cameo appearance
2020	Mayabazar 2016	No	Yes	No	No	No	

=== Television ===
Year	Title	Role	Channel	Notes
2015	Bigg Boss Kannada season 3	Contestant	Colors Kannada	Ejected on Day 21
2021	Life Ok	Host	Siri Kannada	Co-hosted with Murali

== Controversies ==
Venkat is frequently seen as a controversial person in Kannada media. While promoting his film Huccha Venkat (2014), Venkat said he was married to the Kannada actor Ramya and gave an expletive-laden speech to a television interviewer. Ramya responded to Venkat's claims by filing a police report and publicly refuting his statements, to which Venkat did not publicly respond; Venkat stopped saying Ramya was his wife and started saying he liked his partner Rachana on the television show Super Jodi, but the feeling wasn't mutual, so in 2017, he tried to commit suicide by drinking phenol. Venkat's speech in response to the poor opening turnout for his film, quickly went viral on YouTube and spawned several parody videos.

In November 2015, Venkat made other controversial statements in a television appearance; he made derogatory remarks about B. R. Ambedkar while taking part in a panel discussion. After the appearance, several students viewing the discussion lodged complaints about Venkat and the news station, which the students said provoked Venkat into making the offensive remarks. These complaints were followed by several protests and blackened Venkat's face. On 19 November 2015, Venkat was arrested and was held in judicial custody at Bangalore Central Prison until 4 December that year.

Venkat's attorney has said Venkat has schizophrenia. As a growing concern, Venkat's remarks on the television channel were discussed in the Karnataka Legislative Assembly. On 25 November, a Bangalore city civil court issued conditional bail to Venkat. Venkat was not released until the surety amount was paid and the completion of bail formalities. He was released on 3 December with conditional bail. Venkat has also said he will become prime minister of India one day.
