= Aptharakshaka =

- Promotional poster
- Directed by: P. Vasu
- Written by: V. R. Bhaskar (Dialogues)
- Screenplay by: P. Vasu
- Story by: P. Vasu
- Produced by: Krishna Kumar (Krishna Prajwal)
- Starring: Vishnuvardhan; Vimala Raman; Sandhya; Bhavana Ramanna; Avinash; Lakshmi Gopalaswamy; Komal Kumar; Vineeth; Vinaya Prasad
- Cinematography: P. K. H. Das
- Edited by: Suresh Urs
- Music by: Gurukiran
- Production company: Udaya Ravi Films
- Distributed by: Krishna Prajwal
- Release date: 19 February 2010
- Running time: 152 minutes
- Country: India
- Language: Kannada

Aptharakshaka (transl. Close Savior) is a 2010 Indian Kannada-language horror film directed by P. Vasu and written by V. R. Bhaskar. The film stars Vishnuvardhan in his 200th Kannada cinema, along with an ensemble cast including Vimala Raman, Sandhya, Bhavana Ramanna, Avinash, Lakshmi Gopalaswamy, and Komal Kumar. The film is a sequel to the 2004 Kannada blockbuster film Apthamitra. The film was released nearly two months after Vishnuvardhan died on 30 December 2009.

The film was released on 19 February 2010 to highly positive reviews. The movie was remade in Telugu as Nagavalli (2010). The movie was dubbed in Telugu as Raja Vijaya Rajendra Bahadur (Nagavalli - Return of Chandramukhi) in Hindi as Sab Ka Rakhwala under the production of Sumeet Arts and in Bengali as Amar Rakshak.

== Plot ==
The story starts off with an ancient painting of Nagavalli (Vimala Raman) floating away to distant places, where it finally comes into the hands of a village painter. The painter brings it home so as to restore it back to its original look. However, when his wife asks him to sell the painting, he becomes furious, saying that he would not sell it even at the cost of his life. The next day, the painter is shown to be dead, possibly by suicide. The painting is then sold off to a dance competition, which was distributed as a prize to Bharatanatyam dancer Saraswathi (Lakshmi Gopalaswamy), her husband, and her family.

Meanwhile, on the engagement day of Gowri (Sandhya), one of her friends fainted after encountering a 30-foot snake, and the bridegroom had run away from the family house fearing something. Many strange incidents happened, so the family called for a snake charmer to the house, but the snake charmer died when he attempted to make the serpent appear. The family members are psychologically affected by the presence of Nagavalli's painting, and things have not been going well in the house, so they decide to contact Acharya Ramchandra Shastry (Avinash), an astrologer cum sage. The father of the three daughters tells Sastry that Saraswathi and her husband met with a fatal accident and died, after the Bharatnatyam competition. Sastry takes the help of Dr. Vijay (Vishnuvardhan), a psychiatrist, to solve the problem. All directions point to the huge portrait of Nagavalli, and it is observed that the portrait is the cause of this. Everyone is warned not to go to the outhouse or to the room where the painting is.

One night, Vijay goes to the outhouse as he hears anklet sounds, and he sees another smaller portrait of Nagavalli in the outhouse. It is then revealed that Saraswathi is still alive, but she became mad after a truck accident in which her husband died while he was carrying the painting of Nagavalli, and that she said that no one accepted to marry the second daughter Geetha because Saraswathi was mad, and so Geetha vowed that she would not marry, and since they did not want Gowri's situation to be like this, they lied by saying that Saraswathi was dead and locked her up in the outhouse. On a few occasions, someone attempted to murder Sastry twice. Suspecting Saraswathi, Sastry asks the family members to bring Saraswathi to the temple and that he will show everyone that Nagavalli is in Saraswathi's body, but as Saraswathi steps towards the temple, all the animals run out of the temple. Suspecting each and every person in the family, Vijay starts to investigate everything, so he goes to the library to read a book based on Vijaya Rajendra Bahadur's life and further information on Nagavalli too.

The investigation also takes back to around 125 years when Raja Vijaya Rajendra Bahadur (Vishnuvardhan) used to live and how his enmity with Nagavalli has been going on since centuries. Vijay becomes very shocked to see the Bahadur for two reasons. The first is that the portrait he saw in the old palace five years ago, was actually the portrait of Bahadur's elder brother, Vinaya Rajendra Bahadur, who was killed by Bahadur himself for the sake of ruling the kingdom. The second is that Bahadur resembles Vijay himself. It is revealed in the book that he had attempted to escape as one of his men had spread a dirty rumour about him, which caused the whole Ram Nagara Dominion and the people to go and assassinate him, but the book does not say if he got assassinated, committed suicide, or if he actually is alive.

Vijay finishes reading the book and whilst signing the ledger, he reads the name above him (Nagavalli) and understands that she had read the book before he had. To further investigate about Nagavalli, Vijay goes to Nagavalli's place in Peddapuram, Andhra Pradesh and an old man told the doctor that Nagavalli's family died back at around 100 years. The old man tells Vijay that he was the second person to enquire about Nagavalli's family, and as the doctor asked who that person was, the old man told him that a girl came and inquired about Nagavalli, and he also says that she was fine whilst asking the questions, but when she returned from Nagavalli's place, she was holding a portrait of Nagavalli and ran away like a mad girl. The doctor goes to Nagavalli's house and realizes that the portrait in the outhouse was the portrait of Nagavalli, which had been taken, as he glanced at an empty wall with a rectangular marking outline. Vijay also investigates about Saraswathi's husband's death and the snake charmer's death, and he comes with information that the snake charmer's death and Saraswathi's husband's death had nothing to do with Nagavalli.

Vijay reveals that Bahadur is still alive when he printed out an astrological profile and showed the astrologer, who revealed it. So Vijay goes to the fort where the Bahadur is, and at the time, Sastry performs a pooja to try to bring Nagavalli out of Saraswathi's body. The doctor luckily escapes from the invincible Raja, and when Sastry asks for Saraswathi's name, she says her name as Nagavalli Saraswathi. It is revealed that she is still mad, but not affected by Nagavalli. Vijay comes back to cure Saraswathi from her madness, and he succeeds, but Nagavalli's problem is not finished yet, and he knows who is affected by Nagavalli. Later, the doctor reveals to everyone that Gowri is affected by Nagavalli as he makes her angry and changes her personality from Gowri to Nagavalli in front of everyone, then she swoons after she returns to normal. Then later, he explains to everyone that Gowri had written both the names while she signed the ledger: Gowri in English when she was borrowing the book, Nagavalli in Telugu when she was returning the book, and that it was also her who scared the bridegroom away on the engagement day and sat downstairs as if she did not know anything. In order to know more about Nagavalli's lover Ramanatha (Vineeth), she went to Nagavalli's house as Gowri, and returned with Nagavalli's photo, completely as Nagavalli. Gowri later goes to the fort where Bahadur is in order to kill him. Vijay, knowing that Gowri would have definitely sought revenge, goes to the fort where Bahadur almost gets burned to death, but he survives when it starts to rain. Vijay then has a battle with him, but Bahadur almosts decapitates Gowri/Nagavalli. Before he does so, however, he gets struck by lightning; thus, throwing his sword above and as it comes down, it stabs Bahadur in the neck, who then dies. Gowri is no longer affected by Nagavalli anymore and is going to marry the bridegroom whom she scared away, and Geetha is going to marry too. The film comes to a happy ending.

== Cast ==
- Vishnuvardhan as Dr. Vijay / Raja Vijaya Rajendra Bahadur(dual role)
- Vimala Raman as Nagavalli
- Sandhya as Gowri
- Bhavana Ramanna as Geetha
- Avinash as Acharya Ramchandra Shastry
- Lakshmi Gopalaswamy as Saraswathi
- Komal Kumar as Dr. Srinath
- Vineeth as Ramanatha
- Vinaya Prasad as Gowri's mother
- Suja as Hema
- Sindhu Chethan as Pooja
- Rajesh Nataranga as Shoorasena
- Veena Sundar
- Srinivasa Murthy as Gowri’s Father
- Ramesh Bhat
- Mandeep Roy
- Rathnakar
- Chethan Ramarao
- Ravi Chethan
- Padmini Prakash
- K S Suchithra
- Rani Dhamukumar
- NGEF Ramamurthy
- R. G. Vijayasarathy
- Ganesh Rao Kesarkar
- Ravindranath
- Mysore Ramanand
- Sadashiva Brahmaavar
- Suresh Rai
- Shivajirao Jadhav
- Krishna Prajwal in a special appearance
- P. Vasu in a special appearance
- Gurukiran in a special appearance

== Production ==
=== Casting ===
Vimala Raman was selected as the lead female role to reprise the role of 'Nagavalli'.Later Tamil actress, Sandhya was added to the cast as the second female lead. Lead actor Vishnuvardhan died following a cardiac arrest on 30 December 2009.

=== Filming ===
The film started filming in March 2009 in Palani, Tamil Nadu. The majority of shooting was done in Mysore. The fort, where the villain Vijaya Rajendra Bahadur resides, is based on the real fort located in Gingee.

== Soundtrack ==
Aptharakshaka

Soundtrack album by Guru Kiran
- Released: 2010
- Genre: Film soundtrack
- Label: Swarna Audio

No.	Title	Performer(s)	Length
1.	"Chamundi Taayi Aane"	S. P. Balasubrahmanyam, Gurukiran
2.	"Kabadi Kabadi"	S. P. Balasubrahmanyam, Shamitha Malnad
3.	"Garane Gara Garane"	S. P. Balasubrahmanyam
4.	"Rakshaka Aptharakshaka"	S. P. Balasubrahmanyam, Rajesh Krishnan, Nanditha
5.	"Omkara"	Lakshmi Nataraj
6.	"Kabadi Kabadi"	Karthik, Shamitha Malnad

== Television Rights ==
Kannada Version Rights are acquired by Star Suvarna and Star Suvarna Plus. Telugu dubbed version rights are acquired by Star Maa. Hindi dubbed version rights are acquired by UTV. Bengali dubbed Version rights are acquired by Zee Bangla Cinema.

== Reception ==
=== Critics ===
The film got almost good reviews from critics. Shruti Indira Lakshminarayana of Rediff.com scored the film at 4 out of 5 stars and says "Vishnuvardhan. Location and costumes add to the plot. The use of graphics is seen throughout the film. In short, Aptharakshaka reminds you of the great talent that the Kannada industry has lost in Vishnuvardhan. This one is a must watch". Bangalore Mirror wrote "P Vasu deserves all the praise for deft handling of an interesting plot he has conceived. There is hardly a scene that is out of place. Gurukiran's music and PKH Doss' camera work complement the film that is a must watch". BS Srivani of Deccan Herald wrote "The bevy of beauties - Vimala Raman, Lakshmi Gopalswamy and Sandhya- together provide perfect support to Vishnu. This story could have been evolved into a perfect series. If only Vishnu was alive!"

=== Box office ===
The grand opening in Bangalore was well attended, with black market tickets selling for up to Rs 300. The movie completed a silver jubilee run at the box office.

== Awards ==
- Vishnuvardhan won the Karnataka State Film Award for Best Actor for his scintillating and splendid performance in this film.
- Won Karnataka State Film Award for Best Female Playback Singer- Lakshmi Nataraj for the song "Omkara Abhinaya Veda"

Filmfare Awards

Won

- Best Supporting Actor – Kannada - Avinash
- Best Male Playback Singer – Kannada - Dr.S. P. Balasubrahmanyam - "Gharane"
- Best Lyricist – Kannada - Kaviraj - "Gharane"

Nominated

- Best Film – Kannada - Krishna Kumar
- Best Supporting Actress – Kannada - Lakshmi Gopalaswamy
- Best Music Director – Kannada - Guru Kiran
