= Ring Master (2015 film) =

- Theatrical release poster
- Directed by: Vishruth Nayak
- Starring: Arun Sagar; Anushree; Shrunga; Shwata
- Cinematography: Cinetech Soori
- Edited by: Harish G
- Music by: Ravi Basrur
- Release date: 9 October 2015
- Country: India
- Language: Kannada

Ring Master is a 2015 Indian Kannada language film directed by Kumar Datth. It stars Arun Sagar, Anushree, Shrunga and Shweta. The music was composed by Ravi Basrur. The film is a remake of the Thai film Countdown (2012). It was theatrically released on 9 October 2015.

== Synopsis ==
Three young friends, planning to celebrate New Year's Eve at their apartment, call a drug peddler. At first, the peddler seems friendly, but everything changes when the man shows his true colours.

== Cast ==
- Arun Sagar
- Anushree
- Shrunga
- Shweta

== Reception ==
Archana Nathan from The Hindu says "The filmmaker even manages to showcase the drug-induced trip through his camera work but with such a shoddy script and a murderer Bhangiranga as its son of god, the film is difficult to sit through". A Shardhaa from The New Indian Express said "Though true to everybody’s life, Ring Master misses all opportunities to connect morally or emotionally with the audience". A reviewer from Deccan Herald wrote "The film lacks finesse and turns out head splitting affair, never really engaging or entertaining, despite visible technical polish. It leaves expectant audiences a highly frustrated lot at the end of an excruciating show". Shyam Prasad S. from Bangalore Mirror says "It would have been great if the film was an original. It is still good. What is bad is claiming credit for ‘creating’ the film".
