= Rapid Rashmi =

Indian radio personality

- Born: Rashmi R Rao; India
- Occupations: Radio Jockey, Podcast Host, Entrepreneur, Singer, Actor
- Years active: 2007–present
- Spouse: Davis

Rashmi R. Rao, also known as RJ Rapid Rashmi, is an Indian radio personality and actor from Bangalore.

== Career ==
She has worked as a radio jockey and a TV anchor. She also participated in the dance reality show Dancing star, but was eliminated. She has also sung a song for the movie Deal Raja. She contested in the reality show Bigg Boss Kannada (season 6).

She is also the host of the podcast 'Just Curious' on her Rapid Rashmi YouTube channel. The podcast features conversations with personalities such as Dr. Shivarajkumar, Sriimurali, Sudha Rani, Ashika Ranganath, Shruti Hariharan, Nagathihalli Chandrashekhar and entrepreneurs like Raghvendra Rao, Zerodha VP, KMF, KSDL and so on.

Expanding her reach, she has also launched the 'Just Curious' English podcast, connecting with a wider audience through engaging English-language conversations.

Currently, Rashmi is associated with 92.7 Big FM.

== Filmography ==
=== Television ===
Year	Title	Role	Channel	Notes
2015	Dancing Star 2	Judge	Colors Kannada	
2018–2019	Bigg Boss Kannada 6	Contestant	Colors Kannada	4th runner up

=== Films ===
Year	Title	Role	Notes
2015	Namak Haraam	Rashmi	

== Awards ==
- IRF- Indian Radio Forum silver winner for Best show "Retro Savaari" 2017
- IRF- Indian Radio Forum silver winner for Best show "Retro Savaari" 2016.
- Aryabhatta awardee - RJ of the year 2016
- Media awards - Best RJ of the year 2016
