= Parapancha =

- Directed by: Krish Joshi
- Screenplay by: Krish Joshi
- Story by: Krish Joshi
- Produced by: Yogaraj Bhat
- Starring: Diganth; Ragini Dwivedi; Anant Nag; Undyboi Prajwal
- Cinematography: Santhosh Rai Pathaje
- Edited by: Suresh Urs
- Music by: Veer Samarth
- Production companies: Yogaraj Movies; Vedam Studios
- Distributed by: Vedam Studios
- Release date: 15 January 2016
- Country: India
- Language: Kannada

Parapancha is a 2016 Indian Kannada-language psychological comedy film directed & written by Krish Joshi and produced by Yogaraj Movies in association with Vedam Studios. The film stars Diganth and Ragini Dwivedi in the lead roles besides Anant Nag, Bhavana Rao and H. G. Dattatreya in other pivotal roles. The music is composed by Veer Samarth.

Actor Yogesh has featured in a special song sequence.

== Cast ==
- Diganth as Jokumara Seenu
- Ragini Dwivedi as Kasturi
- Ashok as Vijay
- Anant Nag as Naalkane
- Rangayana Raghu as Mountbatten Tippi
- Yogaraj Bhat as Kaalipeeli
- Bhavana Rao
- Anitha Bhat
- K. S. L. Swamy
- H. G. Dattatreya
- V. Manohar
- Sagar S.
- Vikas
- Rockline Sudhakar as Setu
- Prashanth Siddi as Mahesha
- Yogesh in a special appearance
- Huccha Venkat in a special appearance

== Soundtrack ==
Parapancha

Soundtrack album by Veer Samarth
- Released: 11 July 2015
- Genre: Feature film soundtrack
- Length: 31:25
- Label: Anand Audio

The soundtrack and film score was composed by Veer Samarth. Lyrics for the soundtrack was penned by Yogaraj Bhat and Jayant Kaikini. Anand Audio distributed the album into the market. Actors Anant Nag and Rangayana Raghu recorded a song each for the soundtrack. The soundtrack album consists of eight tracks. The album was released on 11 July 2015 in Bangalore. In December 2015, director and actor Huccha Venkat recorded the track "Huttida Ooranu" for the film.

=== Track listing ===
No.	Title	Lyrics	Singer(s)	Length
1.	"Bayi Basale Soppu"	Yogaraj Bhat	V. Harikrishna, Indu Nagaraj	4:04
2.	"Yaava Ooranu"	Yogaraj Bhat	Vani Harikrishna	3:42
3.	"Huttida Ooranu"	Yogaraj Bhat	Huccha Venkat	5:31
4.	"Health Importantu"	Yogaraj Bhat	Sangeetha Ravindranath, V. Harikrishna, Damodar Naik, Meghana Joshi, Rangayana Raghu	3:45
5.	"Daari Thappi"	Jayant Kaikini	Chintan Vikas	3:59
6.	"Oh Appdire"	Yogaraj Bhat	Rangayana Raghu, Johny	3:20
7.	"Bayi Basale Soppu – Theme"	Yogaraj Bhat	Indu Nagaraj, V. Harikrishna	4:04
8.	"Kavanagalu"	Krish Joshi	Ananth Nag	3:00
9.	"Huttida Ooranu"	Yogaraj Bhat	Veer Samarth	5:31
Total length:				31:25
