= Yenagi =

Coordinates: 15°45′N 74°58′E

Yenagi ಏಣಗಿ
- Village
- Interactive map of Yenagi
- Country: India
- State: Karnataka
- District: Belagavi
- Established: 1960
- Founder: ಏಣಗಿ ಬಾಳಪ್ಪ
- Named for: ಏಣಗಿ ಬಾಳಪ್ಪ

Languages
  - Official: Kannada
- Time zone: UTC+5:30 (IST)

Yenagi ("ಏಣಗಿ"), is a village, named after renowned theatre personality Sri Yenagi Balappa (ಏಣಗಿ ಬಾಳಪ್ಪ), situated in Saundatti Taluk of Belagavi district in the southern state of Karnataka, India.
