= Red Alert (2015 film) =

Indian action drama film

- Kannada version poster
- Directed by: Chandra Mahesh
- Written by: Sriram Chowdhury (dialogues)
- Screenplay by: Chandra Mahesh
- Story by: Sriram Chowdhury
- Produced by: P V Sriram Reddy; P. S. Trilok Reddy (presenter)
- Starring: H. H. Mahadev; Anjana Menon; Suman; Vinod Kumar Alva
- Edited by: P R Goutham Raju
- Music by: Ravi Varma
- Production company: Cine Nilaya Creations LLP
- Release dates: 31 July 2015 (Kannada); 14 August 2015 (Malayalam); 6 November 2015 (Telugu)
- Country: India
- Languages: Kannada; Malayalam; Telugu

Red Alert is a 2015 Indian action drama film co-written and directed by Chandra Mahesh. The film stars H. H. Mahadev, Anjana Menon, Suman and Vinod Kumar Alva. The film was simultaneously shot in Kannada, Malayalam and Telugu with the Malayalam version titled as High Alert. All three versions featured a slightly different supporting cast.

== Plot ==
Four boys from the city come to watch the massive Ganesha immersion. What turn did their lives take forms the rest of the story.

== Cast ==
Actor (Kannada)	Actor (Malayalam)	Actor (Telugu)	Role
H. H. Mahadev			Sri Ram
Anjana Menon			DCP Bhuvaneswari
Suman			
K. Bhagyaraj			Doctor
Vinod Kumar Alva			
Bullet Prakash	Kalabhavan Shajon	Posani Krishna Murali	
Kuri Prathap	Dharmajan Bolgatty	Ali	
Divya Gowda			

Kannada

- Mohan Juneja
- Tumkur Mohan

Malayalam

- Anoop Chandran
- Riyaz Khan

Telugu

- Harsha Chemudu as himself
- Gundu Sudarshan as a director

== Production ==
Director Chandra Mahesh initially proposed his script to Suresh Reddy of 6TV Telangana, but Reddy was busy at the time and was unable to produce the film so Chandra Mahesh sought out a different producer. The film began production on 15 March 2014. The film was shot in four languages namely Kannada, Malayalam, Telugu and Tamil, although the Tamil version Chennai Nagaram was never released. This film marked the debut of H. H. Mahadev, who was also the producer's son. Chandra Mahesh signed on Anjana Menon after seeing her work in the unreleased Tamil film Payanangal Thodarkindrana in which she rides a bullet during a chase sequence. Menon plays an encounter specialist in the film and did all of her stunts herself. Vinod Kumar Alva plays a don in the film. In one sequence, Menon had to drive a bullet and shoot with her left hand. The gunshot subsequently affected her hearing in her right ear and took her three months to recover. The film was completed by September of 2014, and the remaining song was shot on 18 December 2014.

== Soundtrack ==
The music was composed by Ravi Varma.

Kannada

- "Pe Pe Dum Dum"
- "Jai Jai Ganesha"
- "Super Hoo"
- "Barbie Dollyy"
- "Jai Jai Ganesha Theme"

Malayalam

- "Jai Jai Ganesha"
- "Super Yeha Sangathiyo"
- "Pe Pe Dum Dum"
- "Barbie Dollyy"
- "Jai Jai Ganesha Theme"

Telugu

- "Jai Jai Ganesha" - Shankar Mahadevan (lyrics by Dr. Venigalla Rambabu)
- "Superehe" - Simha, Gayatri (lyrics by Sriram Tapasvi)
- "Pe Pe Dum Dum" - Vishwateja, Aditya, Varshini, Vaishnavi (lyrics by Srivalli)
- "Barbie Doll" - Lipsika (lyrics by Ravi Varma)
- "Jai Jai Ganesha 2" - Shankar Mahadevan (lyrics by Dr. Venigalla Rambabu)

== Release and reception ==
The film was released in Kannada, then in Malayalam and lastly in Telugu. The release of the film was delayed in Telugu due to the death of the producer.

Regarding the Malayalam version High Alert, Asneem A. A. of Bluefox Media rated the film 3.5/5 and wrote that Anjana gave a good performance as police officer Bhuvaneshwari and her action scenes are worth mentioning. The new face actors are not bad, and the highlight is Mahadev's performance, whose dance was brilliant. Shahjon, Dharmajan, and Anoop Chandran's comedy made people laugh but added that the dubbing could have been better.

Regarding the Telugu version, Y. Sunita Chowdhary of The Hindu wrote, "The movie clearly shows the insecurity of the director. The small twists hardly surprise. The film progresses very slowly and the comedian’s intermittent appearances are irritating. Since there is no place for a romantic track, one of the youth breaks into a dance imagining himself as the hero" and concluded, "the entire execution, technical factors notwithstanding, looks outdated".
