= Arun Sagar =

Indian actor

- Born: 23 October 1963 (age 62); Sagara, Mysore State, India
- Occupations: Actor, art director, comedian
- Years active: 1997–present
- Television: Tarrle (2006); Maja with Sruja (2011); Koyyam Kotra (2013); Comedy Circle (2014); Simpallag Ondu Singing Show; Bengaluru Benne Dose (2015)
- Spouse: Meera
- Children: Surya Sagar, Aditi Sagar

Arun Sagar (born 23 October 1963) is an Indian actor, art director and comedian who mainly works in the Kannada film industry. He has been recognized as a leading art director throughout his career starting from his first movie, Bhoomi Geetha which won the national award for best environmental film. He has worked with veteran directors like Poori Jagannath, Meher Ramesh, Veerashankar and K Raghavendra Rao. He has received Karnataka state award for best art direction for his contributions in the movie Sri Manjunatha. He ran a show on Kasturi TV called 'Tarrle' that resembled a popular show M.A.D. from Pogo TV that taught children about art, painting and crafting. He became popular during the telecast of Maja with Sruja that aired on Asianet Suvarna where he played various comical roles that parodied celebrities and politicians. The show was a huge hit for its satire-comedy structure. Arun Sagar was later hired as the first contestant of Bigg Boss Kannada Season 1, where he emerged as the runner-up for the season. He later reprised the comedy genre with a new show, Comedy Circle that was aired on ETV Kannada. The show was successful, however for unknown reasons, he opted out of the show after few episodes. He also hosted a one-man-show on the same genre known as Koyyam Kotra on TV9 (Kannada).

== Awards and honours ==
- Karnataka State Award: Best Art Director (2002)
- 3rd Suvarna Film Awards: Best Art Director (2010)
- Nominated – SIIMA Award for Best Actor IN a Supporting Role – Male – Kannada
- Nominated – Sandalwood Star Award for Best Comedian

== Filmography ==
=== Films ===
- Janumada Jodi (1996)
- Marma (2002)
- Parva (2002)
- Chandu (2002)
- Pournami (2006; Telugu)
- No 73, Shanthi Nivasa (2007)
- Maathaad Maathaadu Mallige (2007)
- Madesha (2008)
- Veera Madakari (2009)
- Raam (2009)
- Just Maath Maathalli (2010)
- Vishnuvardhana (2011)
- Sanju Weds Geetha (2011)
- Chingari (2012)
- Bachchan (2013)
- Auto Raja (2013)
- Myna (2013)
- Benkipatna (2015)
- Ring Master (2015)
- Sandamarutham (2015; Tamil)
- Amar (2019)
- Kanneri (2022)
- Ramana Avatara (2024)
- Doora Theera Yaana (2025)
- Joker (TBA)

=== Television ===
- Mayamruga (1998)
- Hogli Bidi Saar
- Tarrle
- Bigg Boss Kannada (2013 & 2022)
- Maja with Sruja (2013)
- Koyyam Kotra
- Comedy Circle
- Simpallag Ondu Singing Show
- Bengaluru Benne Dose (2015–2016)
- Connexion Connection
- Chandrakumari (2018)
- Sathya (2020)
- Cookku with Kirikku (2021)
- Shodha (2025)

== Comedy shows history ==
=== Maja with Sruja (2010) ===
Maja with Sruja was a sketch comedy show that was aired on Asianet Suvarna during 2010. The show was directed by "Vijay Prasad", known for his famous directorial venture Silly Lalli. He is also the director of the film Sidlingu. The identity of Vijay Prasad was never revealed in the show. Arun Sagar joined the comedians like Mimicry Dayanand, Antony Kamal and Srujan Lokesh, who hosted the comedy focused talk show. Celebrities were being invited for casual talk as well as film promotions. The show ended in 2011 despite being highly appreciated by the viewers. Arun Sagar played the popular role of "Chidlupudi Chidananda" and also impersonated many celebrities. Srujan Lokesh hinted about a new season in the finale of Maja with Sruja, but this did not happen.

=== Koyyam Kotra (2011–12) ===
TV9 Kannada hired Arun Sagar for a one-man-show on their channel focused on satire comedy in 2011. The show Koyyam Kotra was inspired from the popular show, The Week That Wasn't. Arun Sagar hosted the show, parodied many celebrities from the political and entertainment fields. The show had around 25-episode run and had become quite famous. Later in 2013, Arun Sagar was hired as a contestant for Season 1 of Bigg Boss Kannada by ETV Kannada, where he stood out as the runner-up of the season.

=== Comedy Circle (2014) ===
Arun Sagar, after coming out of Bigg Boss house, started another sketch comedy show on ETV Kannada named Comedy Circle. Though this show appeared to be reincarnation of Maja with Sruja with all the recurring characters, it missed Srujan Lokesh on the show. The show was directed by Vijay Prasad again, and hosted by Arun Sagar initially. The casting was expanded for the show, which included Arun Sagar, Shalini, Mimicry Dayanand, Antony Kamal, Mimicry Gopi, Mithra and Girija Lokesh in the main cast. Arun Sagar became popular for his impersonation of female characters in the show. For unknown reasons, Arun Sagar was present only for first few episodes. Later, Shalini took up the hosting for Comedy Circle and the show successfully completed around 40 episodes.
