= Imran Sardhariya =

Indian choreographer and film director

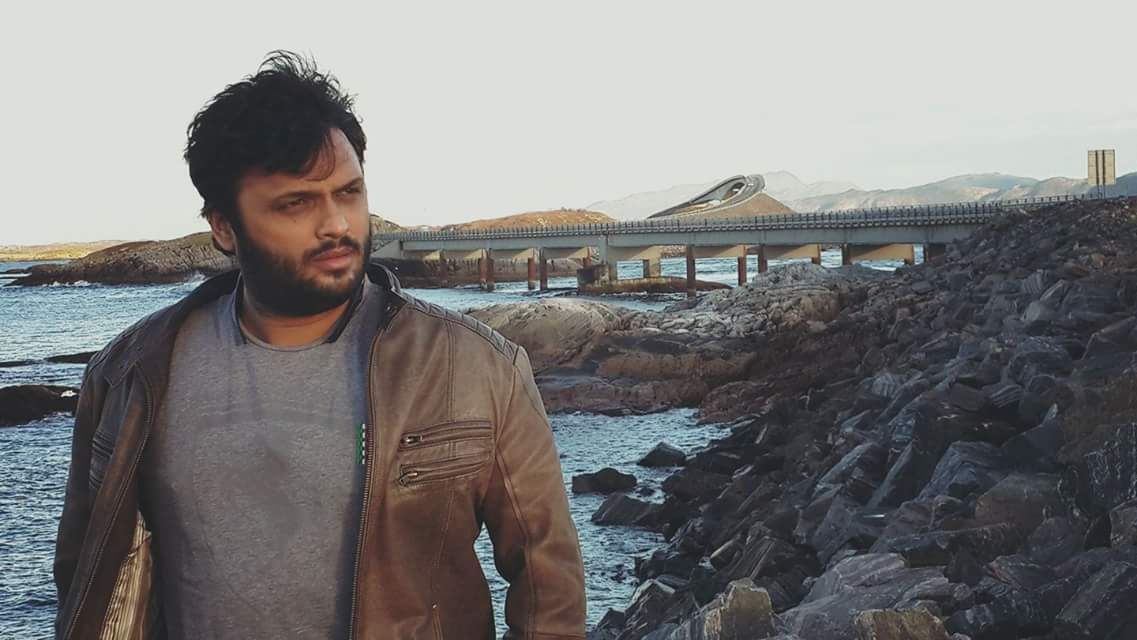
- Imran Sardhariya during the recce of the Kannada film Endendigu
- Born: Imran Sardhariya; 28 December 1979 (age 46); Bangalore, Karnataka, India
- Occupations: Choreographer, Film Director
- Years active: 2005–present
- Children: 2

Imran Sardhariya (born 28 December 1979) is an Indian choreographer and film director known for his works in the Kannada film industry.

== Career ==
Sardhariya is a choreographer in Kannada movies. His life in the Industry for the past ten years has a credit of success more than 250 songs and briefly 100 movies. In addition, he has worked on two Telugu Movies Josh and Chalaki. He was trained for five years by Mr. Jai Borade who is a winner of the national film award for best choreography in Hum Aapke Hain Koun. He has a Dance School in Bangalore known as Dinky's Dance and Music Academy (DDMA).

Imran Sardhariya made his directorial debut with Endendigu in 2015 starring Ajay Rao and Radhika Pandit in lead roles. He had been one of the judges of the reality show Dance Karnataka Dance, which was telecasted on Zee Kannada in 2017.

== Awards ==
He has won several awards for choreography.

Year	Award
2009-2013	Udaya film awards
2009-2012	Suvarna film awards
2013 & 2014	South Indian International Film Awards (SIIMA)
2021	South Indian International Film Awards (SIIMA)

In addition to his credentials he has garnered awards from ETV, ZTV Kannada, Kasturi Kannada channels for Best choreography

== Filmography ==
=== Director ===
Year	Film	Notes	Ref.
2015	Endendigu	Nominated,SIIMA Award for Best Debut Director	
2017	Uppu Huli Khara		

=== Choreographer ===
Key
†	Denotes films that have not yet been released

Year	Film	Song	Notes
2001	Amma Ninna Tholinalli	"Preetige Preetine Chappale"	
2004	Bisi Bisi	"Hey Sexy Lady, Yelu Heje Itarre Marga"	
2005	Rama Shama Bhama	"Pade Pade"	
2005	Amrithadhare	"Mane Katti Nodu"	
2006	Neenello Naanalle	"Something Something"	
2007	Sathyavan Savithri	"Crazy Frog, Dr.Satya"	
2007	Hudugaata	"Stylo Stylo. Eno Onthara"	
2007	Krishna	"Satyabhama Baramma"	
2007	Orata I Love You	"Adu Hyange Hellalli"	
2007	Milana	"Kaddu Kaddu, Kiwi Mathondu"	
2008	Vamshi	All Songs	
2008	Aramane	All Songs	
2008	Gaalipata	"Gaalipata"	
2008	Sangama	"Yeh Dil Mange More"	
2008	Nanda Loves Nanditha	"Jinkemarina"	
2008	Bindaas	"Thara Thara Onthara"	
2008	Gooli	"Chilli Chiken"	
2008	Satya in Love	"Satya Is In Love (Sereyadanu)"	
2008	Ganesha Matthe Banda	"All Songs"	
2009	Maleyalli Jotheyalli	"Shuruvagide Sundara, Yenu Helabeku"	
2009	Devru	"Dura Swalpa Dura"	
2009	Junglee	"Soap Hakkolo, Ee Majawada"	
2009	Josh		Telugu film
2009	Preethse Preethse	"Loose Madha"	
2009	Nanda	"All Songs"	
2009	Raam	"Neenandare Nannege, Hosa Gana Bajana, Nana Tutiyalli, Le Le Ammana"	
2009	Prem Kahani	"Rangu Rangu"	
2009	Vayuputra	"Ba Baare, Rock Your Body"	
2009	Gulama	"Taare Anu Thaare"	
2009	Parichaya	"Nadadaduva Kammanbillu"	
2009	Jolly Days	"Ee Hadige"	
2010	Suryakaanti	"Swalpa Sound Jasti Madu"	
2010	Yogi	"Ae Maga, Neenomme Nakkare, Jogiyada Yogi"	
2010	Chaluve Ninna Nodalu	"Amma Thanks Appa, Seere Narige"	
2010	Chalaki		Telugu film
2010	Jackie	"Andhar Bahar, Shivaantha Hogithide, Jackie Title song"	
2010	Super	"Sikkapate, Missammma"	
2010	Aptharakshaka	"Simha"	
2010	Parole	"Jaadduaagi Manasalli"	
2010	Eno Onthara	"Boom Boom Pa"	
2011	Kalla Malla sulla	"Tuppa Bekku Tuppa"	
2011	Sanju weds Geetha	"Gaganave Baagi, Sanju Mathu Geetha, Yelliruve, Ravana Seethena, Omme Baaro"	
2011	Hudugaru	"Pankaja, Neeralli Churu"	
2011	Sihi Muthu	"Mayavi Yaaro"	
2011	Gun	"Taja Taja Kansugalu, Yene Yaru, Bisi Bisi, Kusumada Banna"	
2011	Krishnan Marriage Story	"Ayyo Rama Rama"	
2011	Paramathma	"Yavanegothu"	
2012	Crazy Loka	"Naavu Aaramagidere"	
2012	AK 56	"Pasandaiti"	
2012	Narasimha	"Dahana Dahana"	
2012	Anna Bond	"All Songs"	SIIM Award for Best Choreographer
2012	Arakshaka	"Kalli Kalli, Kuch Kuch Anthu"	
2012	Rambo	"Manethanka Baare"	
2012	Shiva	"Kollegalldalli"	
2012	Ko Ko	"Kitti Bhava"	
2012	God Father	"Allapane, Sanchari Manasu"	
2012	Addhuri	"Cinderalla"	
2012	Sidlingu	"Barabad Building"	
2012	Kiladi Kitty	"Madhura Hucchu"	
2013	Veera	"Title Track"	
2013	Tony	"Andaja Sikkutilla, Paka Paapi Naanu, Tony Bandha"	
2013	Andhar Bahar	"Andhar Bahar, Maleyalli Minda, Aase Garigedaride"	
2013	Victory	"Akka Ninn Magalu, Onne Onne"	SIIM Award for Best Choreographer
2013	Sweety Nanna Jodi	"I Wanna Sing A Songu, Hesarenu"	
2013	Bachchan	"Bachchan Title"	
2013	Rajani Kantha	"Yentani Sentu, Olavina"	
2013	Chandra	"Tasse Vothu"	Bilingual film
2013	Myna	"Modala Male, Myna Myna, O Premada Poojari, Baa Illi Beesu"	
2013	Director's Special	"Kannale Yeshtothu"	
2014	Ragini IPS	"Ragini"	
2014	Jai Bajarangabali	"Hrudayada Battery"	
2014	Maanikya	"Jeena Jeena"	Nominated,SIIM Award for Best Choreographer
2014	Super Ranga	"Dance Raja"	
2014	Brahma	"Tunta Tunta"	
2015	Endendigu	"All Songs"	
2015	Vaastu Prakaara	"All songs"	
2016	Parapancha	"Baayi Basale Sopu"	
2016	Ricky	"All songs"	
2016	Dana Kayonu	"Nandu nindu yavaga, Halu kudida makkalu"	
2016	Kotigobba 2	" Title track, Introduction song", "Yessalama intro song"	Bilingual film
2017	Machine	"Tera junnon, Itna tumhe chahana hai, Teri meri kahani, Tuhi toh mera mera"	Hindi film
2018	Raju Kannada Medium		
2018	Ambi Ning Vayassaytho		
2019	Kavacha		
2019	Panchatantra		
2019	Kiss		
2019	Avane Srimannarayana		
2023	Chengiz		Bengali film
TBA	Butterfly †		
