= Anushree (Kannada actress) =

Indian anchor

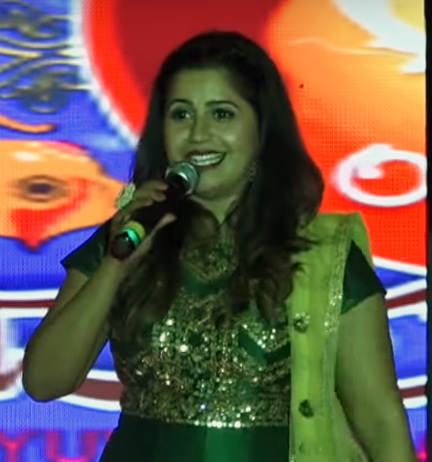
- Born: Surathkal, Mangalore, Karnataka, India
- Education: Mangalore University
- Occupations: Television Presenter, Actress
- Years active: 2005–present

YouTube information
- Channel: Anushree Anchor
- Years active: 2019–present
- Genre: Entertainment
- Subscribers: 1.05 million
- Views: 147 million
- Last updated: 13 April 2026

Anushree is an Indian television presenter and actress who appears in Kannada films. She started her career as a television host in Kannada television and went on to become an actress, she was one of the highest paid anchor in south India. mostly appearing in Kannada language films. She won Karnataka State Film Awards. For Best Dubbing Artist for the film Murali Meets Meera.

== Early life ==
Anushree was born into Tulu-speaking family of Sampath and Shashikala in Surathkal, Mangalore, Karnataka, India. She has a younger brother, Abhijeeth. Her parents separated when she was young with her father leaving "never to return or even stay in touch." She completed her schooling in St. Thomas Bangalore till Class V, before shifting to Narayana Guru School in Mangalore. She returned to Bangalore once she completed her pre-university education, when she received offers to host television shows.

== Career ==
Anushree started her career in television as an anchor in a phone-in music show named Tele Anthyakshari on Namma TV a television channel based in Mangalore. She went on to become an anchor on ETV Kannada's television show Demandappo Demandu, which gained her popularity. She also participated in the reality show Bigg Boss Kannada 1. She completed 76 days in the Bigg boss home. Also hosted several stage shows such as Suvarna Film Awards, Filmfare Awards, TV9 Film Awards, Zee Music Awards, SIIMA Awards, Celebrity Cricket League and went on to feature in prominent shows like, Comedy Khiladigalu and Twenty-Twenty Comedy Cup, Kuniyona Baara and others.

She made her entry to filmdom with Benkipatna which won her the NAK Media Achievement Award for Best Debut Actress. She won the Karnataka State Film Award for Best Dubbing Artist for the film Murali Meets Meera in 2011. Anushree has played a lead role in the film Uppu Huli Khaara which was directed by Imran Sardhariya. Now she is one of the highest paid anchors in Kannada.

== Personal life ==
On August 28, 2025, Anushree married businessman Roshan in a traditional ceremony.

== Filmography ==
Year	Title	Role	Notes	Ref.
2011	Bhumitayi	Gouri		
2011	Murali Meets Meera	Meera	Voice Dubbing	
2012	Belli Kirana	Ananya		
2014	Tubelight	Sandhya		
2015	Benkipatna	Pavani		
2015	Ring Master	Madhu		
2015	Uttama Villain		Tamil film Special appearance	
2016	Madha Mathu Manasi	Item Dancer	Special appearance	
2017	Uppu Huli Khara	Jaanvi		

== Awards ==
- 2011: Karnataka State Film Awards:Best Dubbing Artist (Female): Murali Meets Meera
- 2015: Zee Kutumba Awards Popular Anchor

== Television ==
Year	Title	Notes
2013	Bigg Boss Kannada 1	Contestant
