= Namak Haraam (2015 film) =

- Theatrical release poster
- Directed by: R. Nagaraj Peenya
- Written by: Malavalli Saikrishna (dialogues)
- Screenplay by: R. Nagaraj Peenya
- Story by: R. Nagaraj Peenya
- Produced by: Vijay Anand Kumar
- Starring: Krishna Mahesh; Rapid Rashmi
- Cinematography: Nanda Kumar
- Edited by: Suresh D. H.
- Music by: Satheesh Aaryan
- Production company: Nihal Movies
- Release date: 11 September 2015
- Country: India
- Language: Kannada

Namak Haraam is a 2015 Indian Kannada-language action drama film directed by R. Nagaraj Peenya and starring Krishna Mahesh and Rapid Rashmi.

== Cast ==
- Krishna Mahesh as Jaggi
- Rapid Rashmi as Rashmi
- Rajendra Karanth as Kadu Krishna
- Rockline Sudhakar
- Gaurish Akki as Rowdy
- Yathiraj
- Sharan Kabbur
- Danny Kuttappa
- Kamal
- Pallakki Radhakrishna
- Malavalli Saikrishna

== Production ==
The film, which marked the debut Ganesh's brother Mahesh, began production in the first half of 2014 with the muhurat taking place without disclosing who the heroine is. RJ Rapid Rashmi of Big FM, who was speculated to play the heroine, was confirmed by the makers to be a part of the film. Mahesh was supposed to make his debut with Boundary (2013), but the film never released despite almost the shooting was almost finished. The director and producer of Padhe Padhe (2013) collaborated again for this film. To prepare for the role, Mahesh watched Om (1995), Kariya (2003) and Jogi (2005). The film was shot in fifty days. Mahesh was credited as Krishna Mahesh for the film. The film finished shooting and was ready for release in December 2014.

== Soundtrack ==
Namak Haraam

Soundtrack album by Satheesh Aaryan
- Released: 2015
- Recorded: 2014
- Genre: Feature film soundtrack
- Length: 20:16
- Language: Kannada
- Label: Anand Audio

Satheesh Aaryan chronology
Aakramana (2014)	Namak Haraam (2015)	Sarkaar (2016)

The music was composed by Satheesh Aaryan. The audio launch took place in Bangalore.

Track listing
No.	Title	Lyrics	Singer(s)	Length
1.	"Manaseko Hegigaa"	Gurunath Bhoragi	Sonu Nigam, Shreya Ghoshal	3:51
2.	"Benda Kaalurina Pantaru"	R. Nagarah Peenya	Rushi Kumara Swamiji, Malavalli Saikrishna	4:29
3.	"Nannodige Neenu"	Vigneshwara Vishwa	Avinash Chebbi	4:10
4.	"Laangu Machchugala"	Santhu	Fayaz Khan	4:10
5.	"Hudugirgu Hudugarigu"	Suni, Nagesh Prasanna	Divya Ramachandra	3:36
Total length:				20:16

== Release and reception ==
The film was released on 11 September 2015 alongside Kendasampige, Geetha Bangle Store, 141 - I Love You and Billa.

A critic from Chitratara rated the film 3 1/2 out of 5 and wrote that "In Namak Haram we see such flying and slashing ‘long’ but sensibilities of Padhe Padhe director Nagaraj Peenya is not missing. He has not given anything beyond the boundary. He has attempted at a mass entertainer".
