= Benkipatna =

- Film poster
- Directed by: T. K. Dayanand
- Written by: T. K. Dayanand
- Screenplay by: T. K. Dayanand
- Produced by: Maasthi Zakir Ali Khan; Akhil Khan M. G.
- Starring: Prathap Narayan; Anushree; Arun Sagar
- Cinematography: Niranjan Babu
- Edited by: Jo Ni Harsha
- Music by: Steve; Koushik
- Production company: Maasthi Movies
- Distributed by: Thoogudeepa Distributors
- Release date: 20 February 2015
- Running time: 139 minutes
- Country: India
- Language: Kannada

Benkipatna (Kannada: ಬೆಂಕಿಪಟ್ಣ) is 2015 Indian Kannada language drama film written and directed by T. K. Dayanand. It stars Prathap Narayan, Anushree and Arun Sagar in the lead roles. The supporting cast features Prakash Belawadi, Jahangir, Rangashankara Manju and B. Suresha. The film is based on real incidents that occurred in the Kodagu district of Karnataka.

== Cast ==
- Prathap Narayan as Hanumanthu
- Anushree as Pavani
- Arun Sagar as Dorai
- Prakash Belawadi as Limba Rama
- M. S. Jahangir
- Rangashankara Manju
- B. Suresha as Babuli
- Kalandar Baba Hebbsale
- Renuka
- Sampath
- Kemparaju Doddatti
- Lakshman
- Sa Su Vishwanath

== Production ==
Benkipatna was the first film of T. K. Dayanand, a former journalist and writer, as a director. The film is based on a real life incident that Dayanand covered as a journalist. Prior to its release, it was revealed that the film is a love story of a youth who makes a living selling rat poison and a manual labourer in a fictional town called Benkipatna. Television host Anushree was signed to play Pavani, the female lead in the film, in her first film as a lead actress.

== Soundtrack ==
Benkipatna

Soundtrack album by Steve, Koushik
- Released: 6 October 2014
- Genre: Feature film soundtrack
- Length: 28:16
- Label: Lahari Music

Steve and Koushik composed the film's background score and music for its soundtrack. The album consists of nine tracks that includes three spoken dialogues. The album was released on 6 October 2014 in Bangalore.

Track list
No.	Title	Lyrics	Artist(s)	Length
1.	"Bogaseyalli Male"	Jayant Kaikini	Rajesh Krishnan, Anuradha Bhat	4:36
2.	"Doori Doori"	S. C. Dinesh Kumar	Vijay Prakash, Koushik	3:55
3.	"Ondanondu Kaladalli (Dialogue)"	Yogaraj Bhat	Yogaraj Bhat	1:08
4.	"Huttodyake"	Hrudaya Shiva	Vijay Prakash	4:44
5.	"Yavatthigu Ninnavalu (Dialogue)"	T. K. Dayanand	Anushree	0:51
6.	"Irali Hege Neeniradene"	Hrudaya Shiva	Anuradha Bhat	6:03
7.	"Chintheno"	Dr Chethan Sadanand	Kaushik Harsha	4:35
8.	"Bayi Bitte Helbeka (Dialogue)"	T. K. Dayanand	Anushree	0:17
9.	"Theme Music"		Ajaneesh Lokanath	2:07
Total length:				28:16

== Critical reception ==
Upon theatrical release, the film received positive reviews from critics. Muralidhara Khajane of The Hindu felt the film is "a sincere attempt to present the life of pourakarmikas from all possible angles" and that "Besides being pro-life, Benkipatna is all about the ills of society." He concluded writing, "Anushree steals the show with her performance and dialogue delivery. Pratap Narayan does not disappoint. Prakash Belwadi, Arun Sagar and B. Suresh have filled life into their characters." The Times of India in its review rated the film 3/5 and wrote, "Prathap Narayan and Anushree breath life into their characters. With his flawless dialogue delivery, Prakash Belawadi is a treat to watch. Manjunath Gowda, Arun Sagar and B Suresha essay their roles with ease and grace. Music by Steve Kaushik and camerawork by Niranjan Babu are impressive." A. Sharadhaa of The Indian Express felt the film was a "brave attempt" by a debutant director having taken up a "hard-hitting subject". She wrote commending "a decent performance" by the lead actors. The reviewer for Sify.com felt was made on the "ignored class" of the society. On the performances of the lead pair, he wrote, "The unique love story, the rugged looks, the emotions are brilliantly brought out by these two" and added, "Prakash Belawadi's role is small and classic indeed and Arun Sagar is at his best performance till date." he concluded crediting the film's music and called it "melodious and striking."
