= Huccha Venkat (film) =

Huccha
- Directed by: Huccha Venkat
- Written by: Huccha Venkat
- Produced by: Venkatram L
- Starring: Huccha Venkat; Kavitha Bisht
- Cinematography: M R Chauhan
- Edited by: M Muniraju
- Music by: Rajesh Ramanath
- Production company: Huccha Venkatesh Cine Pictures
- Release date: 28 November 2014
- Country: India
- Language: Kannada

Huccha Venkat (transl. Mad Venkat) is a 2014 Indian Kannada action drama film directed by Huccha Venkat and starring himself and Kavitha Bisht. The film is known for its fair share of controversies and catapulting Huccha Venkat, a controversial actor, to fame.

== Cast ==
- Huccha Venkat as Venkat
- Kavitha Bisht as Ramya
- R. N. Sudarshan as Venkat's father
- Shylashri
- Ramesh Bhat
- Jayalakshmi
- M. S. Umesh
- Keerthiraj
- Ramesh Pandit

== Soundtrack ==
The music was composed by Rajesh Ramanath. The audio launch event took place in Bengaluru with Lahari Velu attending as the chief guest.

== Release ==
The film was a box office failure upon release and was rereleased on 18 December 2015 after his appearance on the third season of Bigg Boss Kannada.

== Controversy ==
Director and actor of this movie Huccha Venkat claimed he was married to the Kannada actress Ramya and gave an expletive-laden rant to a television interviewer, while promoting this movie. Ramya responded to Venkat's claims by filing a police report and publicly refuting his statements, to which Venkat did not issue any response - although he did stop claiming Ramya was his wife. To support his statement, he refused to get into physical contact with the heroine Kavitha during his birthday celebration since he was "already" married.

== Home media ==
The film was telecast on Colors Kannada on 27 March 2016 at 1 p.m.
