= Bigg Boss (Telugu TV series) season 10 =

Bigg Boss
- Season 10
- Season 10 eye logo
- Presented by: Nagarjuna
- No. of days: 77
- No. of housemates: 23
- No. of episodes: 78

Release
- Original network: Star Maa; JioHotstar
- Original release: 6 September 2026 – present

Season chronology
- ← Previous; Season 9

Bigg Boss 10, also known, as Bigg Boss 10: Dasavatharam, is the tenth season of the Indian Telugu-language reality television series Bigg Boss produced by Banijay. Akkineni Nagarjuna hosts the show for the eighth time in a row. The season premiered on 6 September 2026 on Star Maa and JioHotstar.

== Production ==
=== Teasers ===
Teaser was released with caption "This time, it's not a challenge in the game, the game itself is the challenge".

=== Concept ===
The concept for the season is "Dasavatharam".

=== 24x7 streaming ===
The show is streamed 24/7 on JioHotstar and an hour-long episode every day on Star Maa. The episodes will be shown on a 24-hour live stream, from Monday to Friday.

== Housemates status ==
#	Housemates	Day entered	Day exited	Status	Ref.
1	Aman	Day 1		House Captain	
2	Debjani	Day 1			
3	Mukesh	Day 1			
4	Naresh	Day 1			
5	Ramakrishna	Day 35			
6	Ramprasad	Day 1			
7	Shiva	Day 35			
8	Sudheer	Day 1			
9	Trigun	Day 1			
10	Vamsi	Day 1			
11	Varshini	Day 1			
12	Neethu	Day 35	Day 77	Evicted	
13	Swetha	Day 35	Day 70	Evicted	
14	Rohit	Day 1	Day 56	Evicted By Housemates	
15	Jhansi	Day 1	Day 55	Evicted	
16	Shalini	Day 1	Day 42	Evicted & Secret Room	
16	Shalini	Day 44	Day 49	Evicted By Housemates	
17	Dakshi	Day 35	Day 49	Evicted	
18	Charan	Day 1	Day 4	Evicted By Housemates	
18	Charan	Day 11	Day 35	Evicted By Housemates	
19	Apoorva	Day 19	Day 35	Evicted	
20	Srishti	Day 1	Day 28	Evicted	
21	Mithilesh	Day 19	Day 21	Walked with ₹15L	
22	Krishnudu	Day 1	Day 14	Evicted	
23	Chaitra	Day 1	Day 5	Evicted By Housemates	

== Housemates ==
The participants in the order of appearance and entered to the house are:

=== Original entrants ===
==== Celebrities ====
- Debjani Modak – Bengali Actress. She is known for her appearances in television dramas Rasathi, Vaanathai Pola and Ennenno Janmala Bandham.
- Adith Arun aka Thrigun – Telugu Actor. He is known for playing supporting in Katha,PSV Garuda Vega and Chennai Love Story.
- Sudheer Reddy – Anchor, digital creator and social media personality.
- Chaitra Rai – Actress. She is known for her appearances in television dramas Attarintlo Akka Chellelu and Radha Ramana.
- Auto Ramprasad – Actor and comedian. He is best known for his appearance in the comedy show Jabardasth.
- Temper Vamsi – Actor. He is known for playing supporting and negative characters in Temper, Bharat Ane Nenu, Saaho, Pushpa: The Rise, Tiger Nageswara Rao, Naa Saami Ranga Double iSmart and "Ustaad Bhagat Singh".
- Naresh – Comedian. He is best known for his appearance in the comedy show Jabardasth.
- Krishnudu – Actor. His notable works include Villagelo Vinayakudu, Ala Modalaindi and Happy Days.
- Varshini Sounderajan – Actress. She is known for her supporting role in web series Pelli Gola and hosted several television programmes.
- Nihar Mukesh Gowda – Actor. He is best known for the television drama Guppedantha Manasu and Kannadathi.

==== Commoners ====
All the commoners were selected through Bigg Boss Agnipariksha 2, a pre-show.

- Jhansi – Folk singer.
- Aman Masud – Actor and Model. Actor who portrayed himself as a commoner in Agniparisksha show.
- Shalini Damera Patel – Social media personality.
- Shiva Srishti Vyakaranam – Model.
- Charan Mahadev – Radio Jockey.
- Rohit Naidu Patnam – Product Manager.

=== Wildcard entrants ===
==== Commoners ====
- Apoorva Tungaturthy – Model and TV anchor. Entered the house on day 19 as a wild-card entrant.
- Mithilesh Reddy – Model and social media personality. Entered the house on day 19 as a wild-card entrant.
- Ramakrishna Koyya – Content creator. Entered the house on day 35 as a Wildfire wildcard entrant.

==== Wildfire Contestants ====
Five housemates entered the house as Wildfire wildcard housemates.

- Shiva Kumar Marihal – Actor. He is known for his appearances in television dramas Mounaraagam, Ninnu Kori and Koilamma.
- Dakshi Guthikonda – Actress. She is known for her appearances in films like Corona Virus, Extra Ordinary Man and web series Living My Dream.
- Neethu Nataraj – Choreographer. She is known for her appearance in reality show Mad for Each Other.
- Swetha Naidu – Social media personality and dancer. She is known for her appearances in reality show Dhee.

== Twists ==
=== 10 Special Powers ===
On launch day, Bigg Boss revealed 10 game-changing powers. Housemates competed in groups of four to win a Power Key, with eight winners earning one each. Those eight then mutually selected two additional housemates to receive the remaining Power Keys.

Bigg Boss also announced that housemates were strictly forbidden from revealing or discussing their Power with anyone. Any housemate who disclosed their power would have it revoked immediately.

Power	Winner	Description	Outcome
House Duty Penalty	Shalini	The power holder can assign a house duty to a housemate, who must continue it until they leave the house.	Used on Varshini for washroom duty (Week 1)
Switch	Krishnudu	The power holder can swap housemates' positions in the house, but cannot be used during the eviction.	Not used (Evicted)
Grab Any Win	Varshini	The power holder can snatch another housemate's task victory immediately after they win.	Used on Aman to claim the captaincy win (Week 4)
Eviction-Free	Jhansi	The power holder can activate the power to stay safe from that week's elimination.	Used on herself (Week 5)
Eviction-Free	Jhansi	The power holder can activate the power to stay safe from that week's elimination.	Used on Sudheer (Week 8)
Resurrection	Mukesh	The power holder can revive a used power and return it to its original owner.	Used to revive Jhansi's power (Week 8)
Curse of Nomination	~~Srishti~~; Sudheer (Note: On Day 7, Housemates voted to take away Srishti's power. Sudheer won the task and won this power.)	The power holder can directly nominate a housemate in the next nomination process.	Not used (Expired) (Note: On Day 73, all special powers expired and were no longer eligible for use.)
Takeover	~~Thrigun~~; Neethu (Note: On Day 35, Wildfire Housemates challenged a housemate with power to take away their power. Neethu won the task against Thrigun and won this power.)	The power holder can cancel another housemate's power and take over its advantage.	Not used (Expired)
Save Shield	Ramprasad	The power holder can save himself or another housemate from nominations.	Not used (Expired)
Captain's Roadblock	Vamsi	The power holder can block a selected housemate from the captaincy race for 2 weeks.	Not used (Expired)
Double Vote (2X)	Naresh	The power holder can select a housemate to receive double votes against them during the nomination process. Every vote will be counted twice.	Not used (Expired)

== Nominations table ==
Weekly Theme:	Mahapariksha			Power of People	Temptation vs Tension		Total Domination	Road to Reload		Road Block	G.O.A.T		The Ultimate G.O.A.T		Reward & Revenge	Family Time	Dictators	Buddy Up	TBA			
#BB10	Week 1			Week 2	Week 3		Week 4	Week 5		Week 6	Week 7		Week 8		Week 9	Week 10	Week 11	Week 12	Week 13	Week 14	Week 15	
#BB10	Day 1	Day 4	Day 5	Week 2	Day 15	Day 18	Week 4	Day 29	Day 35	Week 6	Day 43	Day 49	Day 50	Day 56	Week 9	Week 10	Week 11	Week 12	Week 13	Week 14	Day TBA	Grand Finale Day 105
Nominees for House Captain	None				Aman; Debjani; Jhansi; Mukesh; Ramprasad; Rohit; Shalini; Thrigun		~~Aman~~; Jhansi; Mukesh; ~~Srishti~~	Aman; Apoorva; Jhansi; Ramprasad; Varshini	Debjani; Ramprasad; Sudheer; Thrigun; Vamsi		Aman; Jhansi; Mukesh; Ramprasad; Shiva; Vamsi; Varshini	No; Captain		Debjani; Neethu; Mukesh; Ramprasad; Thrigun; Varshini		Debjani; Swetha; Thrigun; Vamsi	Aman; Debjani; Mukesh; Naresh; Neethu; Ramakrishna; Ramprasad; Shiva; Sudheer; Swetha; Thrigun; Vamsi; Varshini	Aman; Debjani; Neethu; Shiva			None	
House Captain	None				Jhansi		~~Mukesh~~; Apoorva	~~Aman~~; Varshini	Sudheer		Ramprasad	No; Captain		Thrigun		Vamsi	Naresh	Aman			None	
Captain's Nominations	None				Not eligible	Apoorva (to enter)	Thrigun	Apoorva; Rohit	Shalini	Ramprasad	Aman	No; Captain		Rohit	Varshini; Mukesh	Neethu	Shiva; Ramakrishna				None	
Vote to:	none					Enter	Evict		Save	Evict		Save/Evict	Evict									
Aman	Nominated	Ramprasad	Chaitra	Ramprasad; Jhansi	Not eligible	Mithilesh	Thrigun	Mukesh	Charan	Varshini	Shiva	Ramakrishna (to evict)	Sudheer Sudheer; Shiva; Varshini; Jhansi; Vamsi	Rohit	Sudheer; Varshini	Shiva	Mukesh; Thrigun	House; Captain				
Debjani	Nominated	Charan	Not eligible	Thrigun	Thrigun	Ramakrishna	Not eligible	Rohit	Shalini	Shalini; ~~Ramprasad~~	Swetha	Shalini (to evict)	Jhansi Sudheer; Shiva; Vamsi	Rohit	Mukesh; Sudheer	Neethu	Not eligible					
Mukesh	Nominated	Charan	Not eligible	Not eligible	Charan	Ramakrishna	Nominated	Apoorva	Shalini	Aman; ~~Shalini~~	Vamsi	Ramakrishna (to evict)	Ramakrishna Varshini; Varshini; Jhansi; Vamsi	Ramakrishna	Vamsi; Debjani	Sudheer	Sudheer					
Naresh	Nominated	Charan	Not eligible	Shalini	Not eligible	Ramakrishna	Aman	Charan	Shalini	Rohit	Thrigun	Vamsi (to save)	Varshini; ~~Jhansi~~	Rohit	Aman; Varshini	Neethu	House; Captain					
Ramakrishna	Not in house					Guest	Not Selected (Day 19)		Naresh; Rohit	Shalini	Jhansi	Red; Level	Varshini	Red; Level	Mukesh; Neethu	Sudheer	Not eligible					
Ramprasad	Nominated	High-Risk	Not eligible	Not eligible	Vamsi	Mithilesh	Shalini	Aman; Thrigun	Shalini	Not eligible	House; Captain	Jhansi (to save)	Shiva; ~~Swetha~~	Rohit	Varshini; Neethu	Varshini	Shiva					
Shiva	Not in house								Naresh; Mukesh	Vamsi	Rohit	Swetha (to save)	~~Vamsi~~; Sudheer	Rohit	Mukesh; Ramprasad	Mukesh	Ramprasad					
Sudheer	Nominated	Charan	Chaitra	Thrigun; Shalini	Aman	Apoorva	Charan	Rohit; Shalini	House Captain		Ramakrishna	Red; Level	Not eligible	Ramakrishna	Vamsi; Aman	Mukesh	Not eligible					
Thrigun	Nominated	Charan	Not eligible	Sudheer; Rohit	Not eligible	Apoorva	Rohit	Apoorva; Aman	Shalini	Rohit	Sudheer	Shalini (to evict)	Ramprasad; Rohit; Varshini Varshini; Sudheer; Varshini; Jhansi; Vamsi	House Captain		Neethu	Shiva; Vamsi; Mukesh					
Vamsi	Nominated	Charan	Not eligible	Debjani; Mukesh	Not eligible	Ramakrishna	Charan	Rohit	Shalini	Shalini; ~~Mukesh~~	Neethu	Red; Level	Not eligible	Rohit	Mukesh; Varshini	House; Captain	Not eligible					
Varshini	Nominated	Charan	Chaitra	Not eligible	Shalini	Ramakrishna	Srishti	House; Captain	Shalini	Not eligible	Neethu	Sudheer (to save)	Not eligible	Ramakrishna	Naresh; Shiva	Sudheer	Aman					
Neethu	Not in house								Naresh; Rohit	Varshini	Varshini	Shalini (to evict)	Jhansi Varshini; Shiva; Vamsi	Ramakrishna	Varshini; Vamsi	Thrigun	Not eligible	Evicted (Day 77)				
Swetha	Not in house								Rohit; Naresh	Aman	Thrigun	Red; Level	Jhansi	Red; Level	Mukesh; Aman	Neethu	Ramprasad (to evict); Aman (to nominate)	Evicted (Day 70)				
Rohit	Nominated	Ramprasad	Not eligible	Thrigun; Jhansi	Sudheer	Mithilesh	Debjani	Naresh; Ramprasad	Shalini	Vamsi; ~~Jhansi~~	Sudheer	Red; Level	~~Naresh~~	Red; Level	Evicted by Housemates (Day 56)							
Jhansi	Nominated	Charan	Not eligible	Not eligible	House Captain		Srishti	Rohit; Aman	Shalini	Not eligible	Ramakrishna	Red; Level	~~Shiva~~	Evicted (Day 55)			Debjani (to evict); Mukesh (to nominate)					
Shalini	Nominated	Ramprasad	Not eligible	Not eligible	Varshini	Mithilesh	Not eligible	Thrigun	Nominated	~~Debjani~~; Varshini	Evicted (Day 42)	Red; Level	Evicted by Housemates (Day 49)				Neethu (to evict); Thrigun (to nominate)					
Shalini	Nominated	Ramprasad	Not eligible	Not eligible	Varshini	Mithilesh	Not eligible	Thrigun	Nominated	~~Debjani~~; Varshini	Secret Room (Days 42-44)	Red; Level	Evicted by Housemates (Day 49)				Neethu (to evict); Thrigun (to nominate)					
Dakshi	Not in house								Rohit; Mukesh	Shalini	Rohit	Evicted (Day 49)					Neethu (to evict); Thrigun (to nominate)					
Charan	Nominated	High-Risk	Evicted by Housemates (Day 4)		Jhansi	Apoorva	Not eligible	Mukesh	Nominated	Evicted by Housemates (Day 35)							Sudheer (to evict); Ramprasad (to nominate)					
Apoorva	Not in house					Selected	House; Captain	Mukesh; Jhansi	Evicted (Day 35)								Varshini (to evict); Shiva (to nominate)					
Srishti	Nominated	Ramprasad	Not eligible	Not eligible	Sudheer	Mithilesh	Not eligible	Evicted (Day 28)									Varshini (to evict); Thrigun (to nominate)					
Mithilesh	Not in house					Selected	Walked with 15 Lakhs (Day 20)										Mukesh (to evict); Aman (to nominate)					
Krishnudu	Nominated	Charan	Not eligible	Not eligible	Evicted (Day 14)																	
Chaitra	Nominated	Not eligible	Sudheer	Evicted by Housemates (Day 5)													Vamsi (to evict); Varshini (to nominate)					
Notes	1, 2	3	4	5, 6	7, 8	9, 11, 12	10, 12, 13	14, 15, 16, 17, 18	19, 20	21, 22, 24	23, 24, 25	27	26, 28, 30	31	29, 32	29, 33	29, 34					
Against Public Vote	Aman; ~~Chaitra~~; ~~Charan~~; Debjani; Jhansi; Krishnudu; Mukesh; Naresh; ~~Ramprasad~~; ~~Rohit~~; Shalini; Srishti; Sudheer; Thrigun; ~~Vamsi~~; Varshini	Charan; Ramprasad	Aman; Chaitra; Sudheer; Varshini	Jhansi; Krishnudu; Mukesh; Ramprasad; Rohit; Shalini; Srishti; Sudheer; Thrigun; Varshini	Aman; Charan; Jhansi; Shalini; Sudheer; Thrigun; Vamsi; Varshini		Aman; Charan; Debjani; Mukesh; Naresh; Rohit; Shalini; Srishti; Thrigun	~~Aman~~; Apoorva; Charan; ~~Jhansi~~; Mukesh; Naresh; ~~Ramprasad~~; Rohit; Shalini; ~~Thrigun~~	Charan; Shalini	Aman; Ramprasad; Rohit; Shalini; Vamsi; Varshini	~~Aman~~; Dakshi; Jhansi; ~~Neethu~~; Ramakrishna; Rohit; Shiva; Sudheer; Swetha; ~~Thrigun~~; Vamsi; Varshini	Jhansi; Ramakrishna; Rohit; Shalini; Sudheer; Swetha; Vamsi	Jhansi; Ramakrishna; ~~Ramprasad~~; Rohit; Shiva; ~~Sudheer~~; Vamsi; ~~Varshini~~	Ramakrishna; Rohit; Swetha	Aman; ~~Debjani~~; Mukesh; Naresh; Neethu; Ramprasad; Shiva; Sudheer; ~~Vamsi~~; Varshini	Aman; Debjani; Mukesh; Naresh; Neethu; Ramakrishna; Ramprasad; Shiva; Sudheer; Swetha; Thrigun; Varshini	Aman; Debjani; Mukesh; Neethu; Ramakrishna; Ramprasad; Shiva; Sudheer; Thrigun; Vamsi; Varshini					
Re-entered	None			Charan	None						Shalini	None										
Secret Room	None									Shalini	None											
Walked	None					Mithilesh	None															
Evicted	No; Eviction	Charan	Chaitra	Krishnudu	Eviction; Cancelled		Srishti	Apoorva	Charan	~~Shalini~~	Dakshi	Shalini	~~Sudheer~~	Rohit	No; Eviction	Swetha	Neethu					
Evicted	No; Eviction	Charan	Chaitra	Krishnudu	Eviction; Cancelled		Srishti	Apoorva	Charan	~~Shalini~~	Dakshi	Shalini	Jhansi	Rohit	No; Eviction	Swetha	Neethu					

indicates the House Captain.
indicates that the candidate was selected to enter the house.
indicates that the housemate was evicted from the house.
indicates that the housemate was directly nominated for eviction prior to regular nominations.
indicates that the housemate was granted immunity.
indicates the winner.
indicates the first runner-up.
indicates the second runner-up.
indicates the third runner-up.
indicates the fourth runner-up.

=== Nomination notes ===
- ^1: On Day 1, Bigg Boss announced that all contestants will face the public vote, as they must earn their official housemate status.
- ^2: On Day 3, Rohit and Vamsi won the task and earned their housemate status. On Day 5, Ramprasad won the task and also earned his housemate status.
- ^3: On Day 4, Charan and Ramprasad faced a house vote in a surprise mid-week eviction. Charan received the most votes and was evicted.
- ^4: On Day 5, Aman, Chaitra, Sudheer, and Varshini faced a surprise mid-week eviction, with the four housemates voting among themselves. Chaitra received the most votes and was evicted.
- ^5: In week 2, two housemates competed in a race to untie a pole and grab an axe. The winner could either nominate one housemate or nominate two housemates, while the loser automatically received one nomination vote against them.
- ^6: As part of the Power of the People twist, Charan and Chaitra faced the public vote. Charan received the most votes and returned to the house on Day 11.
- ^7: As part of the Temptation vs Tension twist, Mukesh was chosen as the Star Housemate by a majority house vote. He was given a Temptation: either take Captain Jhansi's immunity for himself or allow her to keep her immunity while transferring the captaincy to Thrigun. Mukesh chose to take away Jhansi's immunity and claim immunity for himself.
- ^8: In week 3, two housemates competed in a race to grab an envelope. A third housemate, chosen by Bigg Boss, then decided which of the two could open their envelope. The selected housemate could either nominate or choose another housemate to nominate.
- ^9: On Day 18, three contestants from Bigg Boss Agnipariksha 2 — Apoorva, Mithilesh and Ramakrishna entered the Bigg Boss House as Potential Housemates. The housemates had to secretly vote for one contestant to enter. On Day 19, as part of the Temptation vs Tension twist, Apoorva was granted entry as a housemate despite receiving the least votes. Mithilesh and Ramakrishna, who received an equal number of votes, competed against each other in a task, with Mithilesh winning and earning the second housemate spot.
- ^10: On Day 19, Apoorva and Mithilesh were given the power to mutually eliminate two housemates from the captaincy race. They chose Aman and Srishti.And, they paired up with the existing captaincy contenders: Jhansi & Mithilesh and Mukesh & Apoorva competed in the final captaincy task. Mukesh & Apoorva won, making Mukesh the new House Captain, while Apoorva earned immunity from next week's nominations.
- ^11: On Day 20, the housemates were offered a temptation to leave the house immediately with ₹15 lakh, which would be taken from the Prize money. Mithilesh accepted the temptation.
- ^12: On Day 21, Captain Mukesh was offered a final temptation: give up his captaincy and be directly nominated for the following week's eviction in exchange for saving the bottom two, Vamsi and Varshini. Mukesh accepted the temptation, sacrificed his captaincy, and the eviction was cancelled.
- ^13: In Week 4, the housemates were divided into two teams, Team Bhairava and Team Sapthashakti, for the nominations process. Each Team Bhairava housemate nominated one housemate, while Team Sapthashakti had to mutually decide on two housemates from their team who would be eligible to nominate. They chose Naresh and Thrigun. As the losing team, the Team Sapthashakti housemates were each given one nomination vote.
- ^14: On Day 26, Varshini used her special power "Grab Any Win" to claim Aman's captaincy win, replacing him as the new Captain.
- ^15: On Day 26, Sudheer and Vamsi earned immunity for the week as part of the Dagger Immunity Twist in the previous week.
- ^16: In week 5, two housemates competed in a race to find the hidden apple under one of the boxes. The winner nominated two housemates, while the loser nominated one housemate.
- ^17: As part of the Road to Reload twist, on Day 31, Aman and Thrigun won the task and were safe from eviction. On Day 33, Ramprasad was safe from eviction.
- ^18: On Day 33, Jhansi used her special power "Eviction-Free" to save herself from eviction in Week 5.
- ^19: On Day 35, each Wildfire housemate had to save two nominated housemates. Mukesh, Naresh and Rohit received most votes and were saved from eviction. Charan and Shalini remained nominated.
- ^20: On Day 35, Charan and Shalini faced a house vote to save. Charan received the least votes and was evicted.
- ^21: In Week 6, as part of the Road Block twist, each Wildfire housemate had to select two OG housemates to compete in a course race. The first OG housemate to complete the race had to nominate two OG housemates and a Wildfire housemate who could accept one nomination and reject the other. The OG housemate who lost the race was placed in danger of nomination. After five rounds, the six remaining OG housemates, excluding the five who had already nominated, competed in three additional races. The winner of each race had to nominate one OG housemate. The OG housemate who lost the race was placed in danger of nomination. At the end of the nomination process, Captain Sudheer had to directly nominate one housemate in the danger. He chose Ramprasad.
- ^22: On Day 41, the host penalised Aman, Rohit and Shalini by declaring them ineligible to become captains the following week.
- ^23: On Day 42, the OG housemates voted for the Wildfire housemate they considered the least deserving. Dakshi received the most votes and was directly nominated for eviction for two weeks.
- ^24: On Day 42, Shalini was fake-evicted and moved to the Secret Room.
- ^25: In Week 7, at the end of the nomination process, Captain Ramprasad had to directly nominate one housemate in the danger. He chose Aman.
- ^26: As part of the G.O.A.T. twist, Aman, Debjani, Neethu, Mukesh and Thrigun won the task and were immune from eviction for two weeks.
- ^27: On Day 49, housemates in the Yellow Level each had to save one housemate from the Red Level, leaving Ramakrishna, Rohit and Shalini in danger of eviction. The five Green Level housemates then voted to evict one of the three remaining housemates. Shalini received the most votes and was evicted.
- ^28: In Week 8, the nomination process consisted of four stages. In the first stage, the five Green Level housemates participated and had to mutually agree on how to distribute seven nominations among themselves. They chose Trigun to nominate three housemates, while each of the other four housemates nominated one housemate. In the second stage, three of the four Yellow Level housemates selected by the Green Level housemates nominated two housemates each. Three of the five Green Level housemates acted as judges, accepting one nomination and rejecting the other. In the third stage, four of the six Red Level housemates selected by the Green Level housemates nominated one housemate each. The three judges decided whether to accept or reject each nomination. In the final stage, the five Green Level housemates had to mutually nominated one housemate who had not yet been nominated. They chose Vamsi.
- ^29: As part of the The Ultimate G.O.A.T. twist, Thrigun was granted automatic captaincy contendership for the entire season.
- ^30: On Day 54, in a sudden eviction twist, Sudheer received the fewest votes and was evicted. However, Mukesh used his special power, "Resurrection," to revive Jhansi's special power. Jhansi then used her "Eviction-Free" power to save Sudheer from the sudden eviction and safe for the week.
- ^31: On Day 56, housemates in the Yellow & Green Level voted to evict one of the three housemates in Red Leave. Rohit received the most votes and was evicted.
- ^32: As part of the Reward & Revenge twist, on Day 60, Debjani and Vamsi won the task and were safe from eviction.
- ^33: In Week 10, all housemates, except the House Captain, were nominated for eviction.
- ^34: In Week 11 nominations, evicted housemates returned to nominate one housemate and select one housemate to get the chance to nominate.

== Guest appearances ==
Week(s)	Day(s)	Event	Guest(s)	Notes	Ref.
Week 1	Day 0	Grand Launch	Kiccha Sudeepa, Mohanlal, Vijay Sethupathi	Virtually, to celebrate the simultaneous launch of Bigg Boss in multiple languages.
Week 1	Day 0	Grand Launch	Karthi and S. J. Suryah	To promote their film Sardar 2.
Week 3	Day 20	–	Sundeep Kishan and Jason Sanjay	To promote their film Sigma.
Week 3	Day 21	–	Fahadh Faasil, Ssara Palekar and S. S. Karthikeya	To promote their film Don't Trouble the Trouble.
Week 4	Day 28	–	Amit Syngle	Special Appearance by MD & CEO of Asian Paints Ltd.
Week 6	Day 42	Dussehra Special	Aditya Mandala, Shivathmika Rajashekar and Vishwadev Rachakonda	To promote their web series Varam streaming on JioHotstar.
Week 7	Day 49	–	Rizwan Sajan	Special Appearance by Founder & Chairman of Danube Properties.
Week 7	Day 49	–	Vishwak Sen and Gayatri Bhardwaj	To promote their film #CULT.
Week 9	Day 63	Diwali Special	Sai Aniesh and Anaswara Rajan	To promote their film Itllu Arjuna.
Week 10	Day 65	–	Suresh (Naresh's brother)	Family time week
Week 10	Day 65	–	Swathi (Swetha's sister) and Harikishore (Swetha's father)	Family time week
Week 10	Day 65	–	Ariya (Vamsi's daughter) and Sirisha (Vamsi's wife)	Family time week
Week 10	Day 66	–	Sulochana (Mukesh's mother)	Family time week
Week 10	Day 66	–	Masud (Aman's father)	Family time week
Week 10	Day 66	–	Priyanka Jain (Shiva's partner)	Family time week
Week 10	Day 67	–	Bhagyalaxmi (Ramprasad's mother) and Ujwala (Ramprasad's daughter)	Family time week
Week 10	Day 67	–	Apurbo and Mita (Debjani's parents)	Family time week
Week 10	Day 67	–	Ramadevi (Sudheer's mother)	Family time week
Week 10	Day 67	–	Niveditha (Thrigun's wife) and Yuki (Thrigun's daughter)	Family time week
Week 10	Day 68	–	Natraj Master (Neethu's husband) and Lakshya (Neethu's daughter)	Family time week
Week 10	Day 69	–	Bharani Shankar, Satish Reddy Mallidi, Sai Ronak Katukuri and Madhoo Damaraju	To promote their web series Pushpaka Vimanam streaming on JioHotstar.
Week 10	Day 69	–	Srilatha (Varshini's mother)	Family time week
Week 10	Day 69	–	Ankamma (Ramakrishna's mother)	Family time week
Week 10	Day 70	Family Party	Ali and Harini (Vamsi's sister)	To support Vamsi.
Week 10	Day 70	Family Party	Ravi Kiran, Sowjanya (Varshini's sister) and Hithakshi (Varshini's niece)	To support Varshini.
Week 10	Day 70	Family Party	Getup Srinu and Adinarayana (Ramprasad's father)	To support Ramprasad.
Week 10	Day 70	Family Party	Md Touseef (Aman's brother-in-law) and Nousheen (Aman's sister)	To support Aman.
Week 10	Day 70	Family Party	Nikhil Maliyakkal and Pavan Kumar (Mukesh's cousin)	To support Mukesh.
Week 10	Day 70	Family Party	Dulquer Salmaan and Satvika Veeravalli	To promote their film Aakasamlo Oka Tara.
Week 10	Day 70	Family Party	Amardeep Chowdary and Nandini Modak (Debjani's sister)	To support Debjani.
Week 10	Day 70	Family Party	Gautham Krishna; Mahantesh Mahrihal and Shantha (Shiva's parents)	To support Shiva.
Week 10	Day 70	Family Party	Demon Pavan and Subhash Chandra Bose (Sudheer's father)	To support Sudheer.
Week 10	Day 70	Family Party	Thanuja Puttaswamy and Geetha Patel (Neethu's sister)	To support Neethu.
Week 10	Day 70	Family Party	Hyper Aadi	Special commentary about housemates,
Week 10	Day 70	Family Party	Bullet Bhaskar and Lakshmaiah (Naresh's father)	To support Naresh.
Week 10	Day 70	Family Party	Aata Sandeep and Krishna Kumari (Swetha's mother)	To support Swetha.
Week 10	Day 70	Family Party	Sai Rajesh and Eswaran (Thrigun's father)	To support Thrigun.
Week 10	Day 70	Family Party	K Somulu (Ramakrishna's father) and K Suresh (Ramakrishna's brother)	To support Ramakrishna.
Week 11	Day 77	–	Rashmika Mandanna	To promote her film Mysaa.

== Weekly summary ==
Week 1 : Mahapariksha	Entrances	On Day 1, Debjani, Thrigun, Jhansi, Sudheer, Aman, Chaitra, Ramprasad, Shalini, Vamsi, Srishti, Naresh, Charan, Krishnudu, Varshini, Rohit and Mukesh entered the House.
Week 1 : Mahapariksha	Twists	On Day 2, the ten Power Winners revealed their ten unique powers. On Day 7, housemates voted to take away Srishti's power and other housemates without a power competed for that power. Sudheer won this power. Housemate Status This week's theme was Mahapariksha.: All contestants were directly nominated by Bigg Boss and they must earn their official housemate status.; On Day 6, based on the public vote, Thrigun, Shalini and Debjani earned their housemate status.; On Day 7, based on the public vote, Aman, Mukesh, Srishti, Naresh, Jhansi, Krishnudu, Varshini and Sudheer earned their housemate status.
Week 1 : Mahapariksha	Nominations	All contestants were directly nominated.
Week 1 : Mahapariksha	House captain	None
Week 1 : Mahapariksha	Tasks	On Day 1, housemates competed in groups of four to win a Power Key, with eight winners earning one each. On Day 3, Rohit and Vamsi won the task and earned their housemate status. On Day 5, Ramprasad won the task and earned his housemate status. On Day 7, housemates without a power key competed. Sudheer won the task and won a power key.
Week 1 : Mahapariksha	Sponsors	Colgate sent gift hampers for the housemates.
Week 1 : Mahapariksha	Exit	On Day 4, Charan was evicted by housemates vote. On Day 5, Chaitra was evicted by housemates vote.
Week 2 : Power of People	Entrances	On Day 11, Charan re-entered the House.
Week 2 : Power of People	Twists	This week's theme was Power of People.: The public voted to choose the housemates they wanted to become Captaincy Contenders. Aman, Debjani, Jhansi, Mukesh, Ramprasad, Rohit, Shalini and Thrigun received the most votes and were Captaincy Contenders.; The public voted to decide whether the Captaincy Task would be a Physical Task or a Mental Task. They chose Physical Task.; The public voted to choose one evicted housemate to re-enter the house. They chose Charan.
Week 2 : Power of People	Nominations	This week's nominations process required two housemates to compete in a race to untie a pole and grab an axe. The winner could choose the Silver Axe to nominate one housemate or the Golden Axe to nominate two housemates, while the loser automatically received one nomination vote against them.: Round / Contenders / Winner / Chosen Axe / Loser; 1 / Jhansi vs. Sudheer / Sudheer / Golden Axe (2 nominations) / Jhansi; 2 / Debjani vs. Krishnudu / Debjani / Silver Axe (1 nomination) / Krishnudu; 3 / Rohit vs. Varshini / Rohit / Golden Axe (2 nominations) / Varshini; 4 / Naresh vs. Shalini / Naresh / Silver Axe (1 nomination) / Shalini; 5 / Srishti vs. Thrigun / Thrigun / Golden Axe (2 nominations) / Srishti; 6 / Aman vs. Mukesh / Aman / Golden Axe (2 nominations) / Mukesh; 7 / Ramprasad vs. Vamsi / Vamsi / Golden Axe (2 nominations) / Ramprasad; Debjani, Jhansi, Krishnudu, Mukesh, Ramprasad, Rohit, Shalini, Srishti, Sudheer, Thrigun and Varshini were nominated.
Week 2 : Power of People	House captain	On Day 12, Jhansi and Ramprasad competed. Jhansi won the task and became the first House Captain.
Week 2 : Power of People	Tasks	On Day 9, Aman & Shalini and Jhansi & Mukesh competed as pairs. Jhansi & Mukesh won the task and moved-on to next round and chose Shalini from the losing pair to move-on. On Day 10, Debjani & Rohit and Ramprasad & Thrigun competed as pairs. Ramprasad & Thrigun won the task and moved-on to next round and chose Debjani from the losing pair to move-on. On Day 11, Debjani, Ramprasad and Thrigun competed. Ramprasad and Thrigun won the task and moved-on to next round. On Day 11, as returning housemate's power Charan chose to challenge Thrigun to earn captaincy contendership. Thrigun won and kept this captaincy contendership and Charan lost the challenge. On Day 12, Jhansi, Mukesh, Ramprasad, Shalini and Thrigun competed. Jhansi and Ramprasad won and moved-on to final round of captaincy task.
Week 2 : Power of People	Sponsors	Captain Jhansi received a gold medal from White Gold. Captain Jhansi had to give PhonePe gold coins to two housemates. She chose Mukesh and Ramprasad. In two teams, housemates played a Truth or Spice as part of Sprite Sponsor Task.
Week 2 : Power of People	Exit	On Day 14, Krishnudu received the fewest public votes and was evicted.
Week 3: Temptation vs Tension	Entrances	On Day 19, Apoorva and Mithilesh entered the House as wild-cards.
Week 3: Temptation vs Tension	Twists	This week's theme was Temptation vs Tension.: On Day 14, Mukesh was chosen as the Star Housemate by a majority house vote.; On Day 15, as part of the Temptation vs Tension twist, Mukesh was given a Temptation: either take Captain Jhansi's immunity for himself or allow her to keep her immunity while transferring the captaincy to Thrigun. Mukesh chose to take away Jhansi's immunity and claim immunity for himself.; On Day 16, as part of the Temptation vs Tension twist, Mukesh was offered a temptation to receive a photograph from home. In return, he had to give a tension by choosing to either shred Debjani's letter from home or Varshini's photograph from home. The chosen housemate would also be eliminated from the race to become Captain. Mukesh chose to shred Debjani's letter.; On Day 17, as part of the Temptation vs Tension twist, Aman was offered a temptation to receive food made by his mother. In return, he had to give a tension by choosing to either shred Shalini's letter from home or Rohit's letter from home. The chosen housemate would also be eliminated from the race to become Captain. Aman chose to shred Rohit's letter.; On Day 17, as part of the Temptation vs Tension twist, Srishti was offered a temptation to receive a letter from home. In return, she had to give a tension by choosing to either shred Vamsi's letter from home or Thrigun's letter from home. The chosen housemate would also be eliminated from the race to become Captain. Srishti chose to shred Thrigun's letter.; On Day 18, as part of the Temptation vs Tension twist, Jhansi was offered a temptation to receive a letter from home. In return, she had to give a tension by choosing to either shred Naresh's letter from home or Ramprasad's letter from home. The chosen housemate would also be eliminated from the race to become Captain. Jhansi chose to shred Naresh's letter.; On Day 18, three contestants from Bigg Boss Agnipariksha—Apoorva, Mithilesh, and Ramakrishna—entered the Bigg Boss house as Potential Housemates. The housemates were required to cast a secret vote to choose one contestant for entry. On Day 19, as part of the Temptation vs Tension twist, Apoorva was granted entry as a housemate despite receiving the fewest votes. Mithilesh and Ramakrishna, who received an equal number of votes, competed against each other in a task to earn the second housemate spot.; On Day 20, as part of the Temptation vs Tension twist, the housemates were offered a temptation of ₹15 lakh. Accepting the offer meant leaving the house immediately. Mithilesh accepted the temptation and exited the house.; On Day 21, as part of the Temptation vs Tension twist, Captain Mukesh was offered a final temptation: give up his captaincy and be directly nominated for the following week's eviction in exchange for saving the bottom two, Vamsi and Varshini. Mukesh accepted the temptation, sacrificed his captaincy, and the eviction was cancelled.
Week 3: Temptation vs Tension	Nominations	This week's nominations process required two housemates to compete in a race to grab an envelope. A third housemate, chosen by Bigg Boss, then decided which of the two could open their envelope. The selected housemate could either nominate a housemate or choose another housemate to nominate.: Round / Contenders Chooser / Contenders / Decider / Winner / Chosen Enevelope / Nominations; 1 / Mukesh / Charan vs. Ramprasad / Jhansi / Ramprasad / 2 nominations / Ramprasad nominated one housemate, and gave one nomination chance to Rohit.; 2 / Shalini / Debjani vs. Varshini / Charan / Varshini / 2 nominations / Varshini nominated one housemate, and gave one nomination chance to Sudheer.; 3 / Naresh / Charan vs. Vamsi / Srishti / Charan / 2 nominations / Charan nominated one housemate, and gave one nomination chance to Debjani.; 4 / Rohit / Mukesh vs. Vamsi / Thrigun / Mukesh / 1 nomination / Mukesh nominated one housemate.; 5 / Debjani / Naresh vs. Shalini / Vamsi / Shalini / 2 nominations / Shalini nominated one housemate, and gave one nomination chance to Srishti.; Aman, Charan, Jhansi, Shalini, Sudheer, Thrigun, Vamsi and Varshini were nominated.
Week 3: Temptation vs Tension	House captain	On Day 19, Jhansi & Mithilesh and Mukesh & Apoorva competed as pairs. Mukesh & Apoorva won the task. Mukesh became the new House Captain and Apoorva won immunity for next week's nominaitons.
Week 3: Temptation vs Tension	Tasks	On Day 16-18, the first housemates to press the buzzers in the Living Room and Garden Area earned the opportunity to compete against each other for a spot as a captaincy contender. The first two housemates to press the buzzers and subsequently faced off in the challenge.: Rohit and Mukesh competed against each other to become a captaincy contender. Mukesh won and become a captaincy contender.; Aman and Varshini competed against each other to become a captaincy contender. Aman won and become a captaincy contender.; Srishti and Sudheer competed against each other to become a captaincy contender. Srishti won and become a captaincy contender.; Jhansi and Vamsi competed against each other to become a captaincy contender. Jhansi won and become a captaincy contender.; On Day 19, Mithilesh and Ramakrishna competed against each other to become a housemate. Mithilesh won and earned the housemate spot.
Week 3: Temptation vs Tension	Sponsors	Captain Mukesh received a gold medal from White Gold. Captain Mukesh had to give three PhonePe gold coins to two housemates. He chose to give one to Jhansi and keep two for himself.
Week 3: Temptation vs Tension	Exit	On Day 20, Mithilesh accepted the ₹15 lakh temptation and exited the house.
Week 4: Total Domination	Twists	This week's theme was Total Domination.: On Day 22, each housemate is given a dagger and were asked to protect their dagger.; Housemates were divided into 2 teams. Team Bhairava and Team Sapthashakti.; Team / Housemate / Day 22 / Day 23 / Day 24 / Day 25 / Day 26; Bhairava / Aman / 1 Dagger / / 2 Daggers / / 0; Bhairava / Apoorva / 1 Dagger / / / / 0; Sapthashakti / Charan / 1 Dagger / / / / 0 / 1 Dagger; Sapthashakti / Debjani / 1 Dagger / / 0 / 1 Dagger / 0; Bhairava / Jhansi / 1 Dagger / / / 2 Daggers / 0 / 2 Daggers; Sapthashakti / Mukesh / 1 Dagger / 0; Sapthashakti / Naresh / 1 Dagger / / / / 0; Bhairava / Ramprasad / 1 Dagger / / / / 0; Bhairava / Rohit / 1 Dagger / / / 0; Sapthashakti / Shalini / 1 Dagger / / / 0; Sapthashakti / Srishti / 1 Dagger / / / 2 Daggers / 3 Daggers / 2 Daggers; Bhairava / Sudheer / 1 Dagger / 2 Daggers / / / 5 Daggers / 3 Daggers; Sapthashakti / Thrigun / 1 Dagger / 0 / / / / 1 Dagger; Bhairava / Vamsi / 1 Dagger / 2 Daggers / / / 6 Daggers / 5 Daggers; Bhairava / Varshini / 1 Dagger / / / 0; Charan, Jhansi, Srishti, Sudheer, Thrigun and Vamsi had daggers and were eligible for immunity. Sudheer and Vamsi won immunity for the next week.
Week 4: Total Domination	Nominations	This week's nominations process divided the housemates into two teams. Each Team Bhairava housemate nominated one housemate, while Team Sapthashakti had to mutually decide on two housemates from their team who would be eligible to nominate. They chose Naresh and Thrigun. The losing Team Sapthashakti housemates were each given one nomination vote. Aman, Charan, Debjani, Mukesh, Naresh, Rohit, Shalini, Srishti and Thrigun were nominated.
Week 4: Total Domination	House captain	On Day 26, Aman, Apoorva, Jhansi, Ramprasad and Varshini competed. Aman won the task and became the new House Captain. But, Varshini used her special power "Grab Any Win" to claim Aman's captaincy win, replacing him as the new Captain.
Week 4: Total Domination	Tasks	Housemates were divided into two teams.: Team / Housemates; Team Sapthashakti / Charan / Debjani / Mukesh / Naresh / Shalini / Srishti / Thrigun; Team Bhairava / Aman / Apoorva / Jhansi / Ramprasad / Rohit / Sudheer / Vamsi / Varshini; On Day 22, Team Bhairava won two out of three tasks and become the winning team. Vamsi took Mukesh's dagger and Sudheer took Thrigun's dagger.; On Day 24, Team Bhairava won the task. Aman took Debjani's dagger.; On Day 25, Team Bhairava won the task. Jhansi took Shalini's dagger. Team Bhairava's housemates chose to eliminate Thrigun from becoming the Captain.; On Day 25, Team Sapthashakti won the task. Debjani took Rohit's dagger and Srishti took Varshini's dagger.; Team Bhairava won majority of the tasks and therefore become eligible for captaincy contendership.
Week 4: Total Domination	Sponsors	Captain Varshini received a gold medal from White Gold. In two teams, housemates competed into a quiz as part of Star Insurance Sponsor Task. Captain Varshini had to give four PhonePe gold coins to two housemates. She chose to give two to Aman and give two to Srishti. In three teams, housemates had to used Dazller Eterna make-up products and present on the ramp walk. Debjani, Naresh, Srishti and Thrigun won Dazller Eterna gift hampers.
Week 4: Total Domination	Exit	On Day 28, Srishti received the fewest public votes and was evicted.
Week 5: Road to Reload	Twists	This week's theme was Road to Reload.: On Day 31, the nominated housemates were required to form pairs to compete in the Road to Reload series of tasks. The pairs formed were Aman & Thrigun, Apoorva & Charan, Jhansi & Mukesh, Naresh & Ramprasad, and Rohit & Shalini.; On Day 33, Jhansi used her special power "Eviction-Free" to save herself from eviction in Week 5.; On Day 35, Charan was eliminated through the Wildfire wildcard housemates.
Week 5: Road to Reload	Nominations	This week's nominations process required two housemates competed in a race to find the hidden apple under one of the boxes. The winner nominated two housemates, while the loser nominated one housemate.: Round / Apple Hidden by / Contenders / Winner (2 nominations) / Loser (1 nomination); 1 / Varshini / Mukesh vs. Ramprasad / Ramprasad / Mukesh; 2 / Vamsi / Aman vs. Thrigun / Thrigun / Aman; 3 / Naresh / Shalini vs. Varshini / Varshini / Shalini; 4 / Debjani / Charan vs. Sudheer / Sudheer / Charan; 5 / Shalini / Apoorva vs. Naresh / Apoorva / Naresh; 6 / Mukesh / Debjani vs. Jhansi / Jhansi / Debjani; 7 / Thrigun / Rohit vs. Vamsi / Rohit / Vamsi; Aman, Apoorva, Charan, Jhansi, Mukesh, Naresh, Ramprasad, Rohit, Shalini and Thrigun were nominated.
Week 5: Road to Reload	House captain	On Day 33, Debjani, Ramprasad, Sudheer, Thrigun and Vamsi competed. Sudheer won the task and became the new House Captain.
Week 5: Road to Reload	Tasks	Nominated pairs competed in series of tasks.: Pairs / Points after / / / Pairs / Prior Points / Points after; Pairs / Task 1 / Task 2 / Task 3 / Pairs / Prior Points / Task 4; Aman & Thrigun / 80 / 180 / SAFE / Aman & Thrigun / SAFE; Naresh & Ramprasad / 40 / 120 / 220 / Naresh & Ramprasad / 220 / 336; Apoorva & Charan / 100 / 120 / 200 / Apoorva & Charan / 200 / 286; Jhansi & Mukesh / 60 / 120 / 160 / Mukesh & Shalini / 150 / 236; Rohit & Shalini / 20 / 60 / 140 / Jhansi & Rohit / DANGER ZONE; At the end of Task 2, Aman & Thrigun were at the top of the points table and were safe from eviction.; At the end of Task 3, Jhansi & Mukesh and Rohit & Shalini were at the bottom of the points table. They had to decide among themselves which housemate would continue in the task and which would be sent to the Danger Zone. Jhansi and Rohit chose to leave the task and entered the Danger Zone, while Mukesh and Shalini continued as a pair, carrying forward their average points.; At the end of Task 4, Jhansi & Mukesh and Rohit & Shalini were at the bottom of the points table. They had to decide among themselves which housemate would continue in the task and which would be sent to the Danger Zone. Jhansi and Rohit chose to leave the task and entered the Danger Zone, while Mukesh and Shalini continued as a pair, carrying forward their average points.
Week 5: Road to Reload	Sponsors	Housemates received a special delivery from Amazon as part of the Great Indian Festival. And in three teams, housemates had to select products from Amazon to send it to their loved-ones. Captain Sudheer received a gold medal from White Gold. Captain Sudheer had to give five PhonePe gold coins to two housemates. He chose to give two to Vamsi and give three to Debjani. Housemates competed in three pairs to entertain the judges. Rohit and Shalini won the entertainment task and each received an AI+ Nova 2 Power smartphone.
Week 5: Road to Reload	Exit	On Day 35, Apoorva received the fewest public votes and was evicted. On Day 35, Charan was evicted by housemates vote.
Week 6: Road Block	Entrances	On Day 35, Shiva, Dakshi, Neethu, Swetha and Ramakrishna entered the House as Wildfire housmates.
Week 6: Road Block	Twists	Wildfire Housemates challenged a housemate with magical power to take away their power. Only Neethu won the task against Thrigun and won his power. On Day 41, Aman, Rohit and Shalini were declared ineligible to become captain that week as a penalty from the Host. On Day 42, the OG housemates voted for the Wildfire housemate they considered the least deserving. Dakshi received the most votes and was directly nominated for eviction for two weeks.
Week 6: Road Block	Nominations	This week's nomination process required each Wildfire housemate to select two OG housemates to compete in a course race. The first OG housemate to complete the race had to nominate two OG housemates, while the Wildfire housemate could accept one nomination and reject the other. After five rounds, the six remaining OG housemates, excluding the five who had already nominated, competed in three additional races. The winner of each race had to nominate one OG housemate. The OG housemate who lost the race was placed in danger of nomination.: Round / Wildfire housemate / OG housemate Contenders / Winner / Loser; 1 / Shiva / Rohit vs. Thrigun / Rohit / Thrigun; 2 / Swetha / Aman vs. Mukesh / Mukesh / Aman; 3 / Neethu / Shalini vs. Varshini / Shalini / Varshini; 4 / Dakshi / Debjani vs. Naresh / Debjani / Naresh; 5 / Ramakrishna / Ramprasad vs. Vamsi / Vamsi / Ramprasad; 6 / - / Thrigun vs. Varshini / Thrigun / Varshini; 7 / - / Aman vs. Ramprasad / Aman / Ramprasad; 8 / - / Jhansi vs. Naresh / Naresh / Jhansi; At the end of the nomination process, Captain Sudheer had to directly nominate one housemate in the danger. He chose Ramprasad. Aman, Ramprasad, Rohit, Shalini, Vamsi and Varshini were nominated.
Week 6: Road Block	House captain	On Day 40, Aman, Jhansi, Mukesh, Ramprasad, Shiva, Vamsi and Varshini competed. Ramprasad won the task and became the new House Captain.
Week 6: Road Block	Tasks	Dakshi, Neethu, Ramakrishna, Shiva and Swetha were Team Gold and were tasked with dividing the OG housemates into two teams. Team Green: Aman, Jhansi, Mukesh, Ramprasad, Vamsi and Varshini. Team Blue: Debjani, Naresh, Rohit, Shalini, Sudheer and Thrigun. Team Green won the task. Aman, Jhansi, Mukesh, Ramprasad, Vamsi and Varshini become captaincy contenders. Shiva, who collected the most coins, also became a captaincy contender.
Week 6: Road Block	Sponsors	Captain Ramprasad received a gold medal from White Gold. Housemates in pairs had to advertise the Nilkamal Sleep Mattress. In two teams, housemates had to answer a set of question solded in Vijay Sales. Captain Ramprasad had to give six PhonePe gold coins to two housemates. He chose to give three to Naresh and give three to Debjani. In two teams, housemates had to complete a puzzle of Danube Properties' Sharukhz Residences. The winning team won a hamper.
Week 6: Road Block	Exit	On Day 42, Shalini received the fewest public votes and was evicted. However, the eviction was a fake eviction, and she was moved to the Secret Room.
Week 7: G.O.A.T Greatest of all time	Entrances	On Day 44, Shalini re-entered the House from the Secret Room.
Week 7: G.O.A.T Greatest of all time	Twists	This week's theme was G.O.A.T. (Greatest of all time). The GOAT housemate were granted immunity from eviction for this week and next week.
Week 7: G.O.A.T Greatest of all time	Nominations	This week's nomination process required each housemate to nominate one housemate. At the end of the nomination process, Captain Ramprasad had to directly nominate one housemate in the danger. He chose Aman. Aman, Dakshi, Jhansi, Neethu, Ramakrishna, Rohit, Shiva, Sudheer, Swetha, Thrigun, Vamsi and Varshini were nominated.
Week 7: G.O.A.T Greatest of all time	House captain	No captain
Week 7: G.O.A.T Greatest of all time	Tasks	As part of this week's G.O.A.T. theme, housemates were divided into two levels, Red Level and Yellow Level, based on their journeys so far. They had to compete in a series of tasks to advance to the Green Level, which would grant them immunity from eviction for this week and next week.: Red Level / Yellow Level / Green Level; Dakshi; Jhansi; Ramakrishna; ~~Ramprasad~~; Rohit; Shalini; Sudheer; Swetha; Vamsi / ~~Aman~~; ~~Debjani~~; ~~Mukesh~~; Naresh; ~~Neethu~~; Shiva; ~~Thrigun~~; Varshini; Ramprasad▲ / Aman▲ Debjani▲ Neethu▲ Mukesh▲ Thrigun▲; On Day 45, nine housemates in the Red Level competed. Ramprasad won the task and advanced to the Yellow Level. On Day 46, nine housemates in the Yellow Level competed in GOAT of Endurance. Aman, Debjani and Neethu won the task and advanced to the Green Level and earned immunity for two weeks. On Day 47, six housemates in the Yellow Level competed in GOAT of Common Sense. Mukesh won the task and advanced to the Green Level and earned immunity for two weeks. On Day 47, four housemates in the Yellow Level competed in GOAT of Speed. Thrigun won the task and advanced to the Green Level and earned immunity for two weeks.
Week 7: G.O.A.T Greatest of all time	Sponsors	In two teams, housemates compete in task to add laundry clothes to the correct sections on the Triple Drum AI washing machine by Haier. The winning team's housemates won the Air Fryer by Haier. In two teams, housemates compete in task to find jewellery from White Gold in a form pit. The winning team's three housemates received a chance to express their dreams to buy gold. The female housemates shared their tea experiences while having tea-time with Taj Mahal tea,
Week 7: G.O.A.T Greatest of all time	Exit	On Day 49, Dakshi received the fewest public votes and was evicted. On Day 49, Shalini was evicted by housemates vote.
Week 8: The Ultimate G.O.A.T	Twists	This week's theme was The Ultimate G.O.A.T.. The Green Level housemate were granted immunity from eviction for this week. The Ultimate G.O.A.T. was granted automatic captaincy contendership for the entire season. On Day 54, in a sudden eviction twist, Sudheer received the fewest votes and was evicted. However, Mukesh used his special power, "Resurrection," to revive Jhansi's special power. Jhansi then used her "Eviction-Free" power to save Sudheer from the sudden eviction.
Week 8: The Ultimate G.O.A.T	Nominations	This week's nomination process consisted of four stages. In the first stage, only the five immune housemates participated and had to mutually agree on how to distribute seven nominations among themselves. They chose Trigun to nominate three housemates, while each of the other four housemates nominated one housemate. In the second stage, three of the four Yellow Level housemates selected by the Green Level housemates nominated two housemates each. Three of the five Green Level housemates acted as judges, accepting one nomination and rejecting the other. In the third stage, four of the six Red Level housemates selected by the Green Level housemates nominated one housemate each. The same three judges decided whether to accept or reject each nomination. In the final stage, the five Green Level housemates had to mutually nominated one housemate who had not yet been nominated. They chose Vamsi. Jhansi, Ramakrishna, Ramprasad, Rohit, Shiva, Sudheer, Vamsi and Varshini were nominated.
Week 8: The Ultimate G.O.A.T	House captain	Debjani, Neethu, Mukesh, Ramprasad, Thrigun and Varshini competed in the task, which Thrigun won, making him the new House Captain. As The Ultimate G.O.A.T., he was also granted automatic captaincy contendership for the remainder of the season.
Week 8: The Ultimate G.O.A.T	Tasks	As part of this week's The Ultimate G.O.A.T. theme, housemates divided into three levels from previous week continued.: Red Level / Yellow Level / Green Level; Jhansi; Ramakrishna; Rohit; Sudheer; Swetha; ~~Vamsi~~ / Naresh; Shiva; ~~Varshini~~; ~~Ramprasad~~; Vamsi▲ / Aman; Debjani; Neethu; Mukesh; Thrigun; Ramprasad▲ Varshini▲; On Day 53, Ramprasad and Varshini from Yellow Level won the Hotel task and advanced to the Green Level and earned safety for eviction. Vamsi from Red Level won the Hotel task and advanced to the Yellow Level.
Week 8: The Ultimate G.O.A.T	Sponsors	Housemates received a BOAT Bluetooth speaker from Vijay Sales. Captain Thrigun received a gold medal from White Gold. In two teams, housemates compete in tug-of-war. The winning team received Thums Up cans. Captain Thrigun had to give seven PhonePe gold coins to two housemates. He chose to give three to Debjani and give four to Naresh. Housemates had to dedicate a flavor of TDH Foods to a housemate of their choice. Housemates had to answer true of false to oral health statements. Colgate sent gift hampers for the housemates. The female housemates will have a cup of Taj Mahal tea and shared their favorite relaxations place.
Week 8: The Ultimate G.O.A.T	Exit	On Day 55, Jhansi received the fewest public votes and was evicted. On Day 56, Rohit was evicted by housemates vote.
Week 9: Reward & Revenge	Twists	This week's theme was Reward & Revenge.
Week 9: Reward & Revenge	Nominations	This week's nominations process required housemates to nominate two housemates. Aman, Debjani, Mukesh, Naresh, Neethu, Ramprasad, Shiva, Sudheer, Vamsi and Varshini were nominated.
Week 9: Reward & Revenge	House captain	Debjani, Swetha, Thrigun and Vamsi competed in the task to get support from non-contenders. Vamsi received the most support and become the new House Captain.
Week 9: Reward & Revenge	Tasks	Housemates competed in series of tasks for rewards and revenges.: On Day 59, Swetha won the task, earning a captaincy contender spot and a family visit the following week as rewards. She then took revenge on Ramakrishna, stripping him of his captaincy contendership and his chance to receive a family visit.; On Day 59, Vamsi won the task, earning a captaincy contender spot and a family visit the following week as rewards. He then took revenge on Varshini, stripping her of her captaincy contendership and her chance to receive a family visit.; On Day 60, Thrigun won the task, earning a captaincy contender spot and a family visit the following week as rewards. He then took revenge on Aman, stripping him of his captaincy contendership and his chance to receive a family visit.; On Day 60, Debjani won the task, earning a captaincy contender spot and a family visit the following week as rewards. She then took revenge on Mukesh, stripping him of his captaincy contendership and his chance to receive a family visit.
Week 9: Reward & Revenge	Sponsors	In two teams, housemates compete in answering questions on PhonePe gold. The winning team received ₹10,000 voucher from PhonePe. Captain Vamsi received a gold medal from White Gold. In two teams, housemates compete in a cooking challenge to cook bread pakoda with Gold Drop Oil. The winning team received 6-months free supply of Gold Drop Oil. Captain Vamsi had to give eight PhonePe gold coins to two housemates. He chose to give four to Ramprasad and Thrigun each. In two teams, housemates had to explore Maruti Suzuki Victoris car and correctly answer the most features won.
Week 9: Reward & Revenge	Exit	No Eviction.
Week 10: Family Time	Entrances	On Days 65 to 69, housemates' family members visited the house.
Week 10: Family Time	Twists	This week's theme was Family Time, during which the housemates' family members and friends visited the house.
Week 10: Family Time	Nominations	This week's nominations process required each housemate to nominate one housemate. However, all housemates, except the House Captain, were nominated for eviction.
Week 10: Family Time	House captain	Aman, Naresh, Ramakrishna and Vamsi competed in the task to get support from non-contenders. Naresh received the most support and become the new House Captain.
Week 10: Family Time	Tasks	All housemates participated in the task, with Aman, Naresh, Ramakrishna and Vamsi advancing to the next part of the captaincy task.
Week 10: Family Time	Sponsors	Captain Naresh received a gold medal from White Gold. Captain Naresh had to give nine PhonePe gold coins to two housemates. He chose to give five to Ramprasad and four to Vamsi. In two teams, housemates had to complete a puzzle of Kajaria tiles. The winning team received a room makeover from Kajaria.
Week 10: Family Time	Exit	On Day 70, Swetha received the fewest public votes and was evicted.
Week 11: Dictators	Entrances	On Days 71 and 72, evicted housemates visited to the house for the nominations.
Week 11: Dictators	Twists	This week's theme was Dictators.
Week 11: Dictators	Nominations	This week's nominations evicted housemates returned to nominate one housemate and select one housemate to get the chance to nominate. Aman, Debjani, Mukesh, Neethu, Ramakrishna, Ramprasad, Shiva, Sudheer, Thrigun, Vamsi and Varshini were nominated.
Week 11: Dictators	House captain	Aman, Debjani, Neethu and Shiva competed. Aman won the task and become the new House Captain.
Week 11: Dictators	Tasks	Housemates participated in various task, with Mukesh and Thrigun as Dictators.
Week 11: Dictators	Sponsors	Captain Aman received a gold medal from White Gold. In two teams, housemates had to complete two puzzles of Colgate. The winning team won a memento trophy. Housemates played a game of passing the parcel. When the music stopped, the housemate holding the parcel had to share a story about gold in their life as part of the White Gold sponsor activity.
Week 11: Dictators	Exit	On Day 77, Neethu received the fewest public votes and was evicted.
Week 12: Buddy Up	Entrances	
Week 12: Buddy Up	Twists	This week's theme was Buddy Up.
Week 12: Buddy Up	Nominations	
Week 12: Buddy Up	House captain	
Week 12: Buddy Up	Tasks	
Week 12: Buddy Up	Sponsors	
Week 12: Buddy Up	Exit	

== Related shows ==
=== Bigg Boss Agnipariksha season 2 ===
The digital pre-show audition process titled Bigg Boss Agnipariksha season 2 was launched in June 2026 to select commoners as contestants for the main house.

=== Bigg Boss 10 Buzzz ===
Bigg Boss 10 Buzzz is an Indian Telugu-language television talk show in which the Sivaji, a contestant of Bigg Boss 7, interviews the eliminated contestants. The show streams on Star Maa Music and unaired portions of episodes are streamed on JioHotstar and aired on Star Maa.

== Release ==
Latest seasons of Telugu, Malayalam, Tamil, Kannada and Hindi editions of Bigg Boss were premiered on 6 September 2026. Ahead of the premiere, a promotional video featuring the hosts of all four South Indian editions — Mohanlal, Vijay Sethupathi, Nagarjuna (actor) and Sudeepa was released.

== See also ==
- Bigg Boss (Hindi TV series) season 20
- Bigg Boss (Tamil TV series) season 10
- Bigg Boss Kannada season 13
- Bigg Boss (Malayalam TV series) season 8
- Bigg Boss Bangla season 3
