= Bigg Boss Kannada season 12 =

Indian TV show season

Bigg Boss Kannada
- Season 12
- Logo for Bigg Boss Kannada Season 12
- Presented by: Kiccha Sudeepa
- No. of days: 112
- No. of housemates: 22
- Winner: Gilli Nata
- Runner-up: Rakshita Shetty
- No. of episodes: 112

Release
- Original network: Colors Kannada; JioHotstar
- Original release: 28 September 2025 – 18 January 2026

Series chronology
- ← Previous; Season 11 Next → Season 13

Bigg Boss Kannada 12 is a reality show and the twelfth season of the Indian Kannada-language reality television series Bigg Boss produced by Banijay. The show began on 28 September 2025, on Colors Kannada and JioHotstar, with Kichcha Sudeep as a host for the twelfth time in a row. The premiere episode started with a real-time viewers' voting of deciding the entrance of housemates either as solo ("onti") or as duo ("janti") contestants pitted against each other.

The show was suspended on 8 October 2025, due to environmental issues, and the contestants were sent outside the house for a few hours. On 9 October, the show resumed and the contestants were sent back inside the Bigg Boss house.

This season was won by Gilli Nata (Nataraj) who has received the honourable BBK 12 trophy. Rakshita Shetty was the runner up and Ashwini Gowda won the 3rd prize.

== Closure notice by Pollution Board ==
On 7 October 2025, the Karnataka State Pollution Control Board ordered for an immediate closure of the studio until further notice, citing violations of environmental regulations at the premises. The board issued a notice to Vels Studios and Entertainment Private Limited directing that all activities at the site be stopped with immediate effect.

== Telecast ==
The Bigg Boss season 12 is telecasted on Colors Kannada TV nightly and live on JioHotstar OTT platform including previously broadcast episodes.

== Housemates status ==
Contestants listed in alphabetical order of their names.

Sl	Housemates	Day entered	Day exited	Housemates status
1	Gilli Nata	Day 0	Day 112	Winner
2	Rakshita	Day 0		Evicted By Housemates
2	Rakshita	Day 7	Day 112	1st runner-up
3	Ashvini G	Day 0	Day 112	2nd runner-up
4	Kavya	Day 0	Day 112	3rd runner-up
5	Raghu	Day 21	Day 112	4th runner-up
6	Dhanush	Day 0	Day 112	5th runner-up
7	Dhruvanth	Day 0	Day 108	Evicted
8	Rashika	Day 0	Day 105	Evicted
9	Spandana	Day 0	Day 98	Evicted
10	Maalu	Day 0	Day 91	Evicted
11	Suraj	Day 21	Day 90	Evicted
12	Abhishek	Day 0	Day 70	Evicted
13	Jahnvi	Day 0	Day 63	Evicted
14	Risha	Day 21	Day 56	Evicted
15	Sudhir	Day 0	Day 49	Evicted
16	Chandraprabha	Day 0	Day 42	Evicted
17	Mallamma	Day 0	Day 35	Evicted
18	Ashvini S	Day 0	Day 21	Evicted
19	Manju Bhasini	Day 0	Day 21	Evicted
20	Satish	Day 0	Day 18	Evicted
21	RJ Amith	Day 0	Day 7	Evicted
22	Karibasappa	Day 0	Day 7	Evicted

-

== Secret Room status ==
Sl.no	Housemates	Day entered	Day exited	Housemates status
1	Rakshita S	Day 77	Day 84	Re-entered main house
2	Dhruvanth	Day 77	Day 84	Re-entered main house

== Housemates ==
With the new concept of "Onti" (solo) and "Janti" (duo), this season has featured 19 contestants, originally entering the house on the grand opening day on 29 September 2025.

=== Original entrants ===
- Sudhir Balraj: Actor, best known as Cockroach Sudhir in Tagaru.
- Kavya Shaiva: Actress mainly works in kannada television and cinema, best known for Kenda Sampige and Kothalavadi.
- Satish Cadaboms: Businessman, celebrity dog breeder.
- Gilli Nata: Television and film actor, comedian best known for Comedy KhiladigaLu Season 4,and Bharjari Bachelors.
- Jahnvi: Actress, television personality and anchor, best known for Adhipatra.
- Dhanush Gowda: Television actor, best known for Geetha and Nooru Janmaku.
- Chandra Prabha: Television personality and comedian.
- Manju Bhashini: Television actress, best known for Silli Lalli, Puttakkana Makkalu.
- Rashika Shetty: Model and actress, best known for Manada Kadalu.
- Abhishek Shrikanth: Television actor, best known for Lakshana and Vadhu.
- Mallamma: Social media personality popularly called as "Maathina Malli".
- Ashvini S: Television actress, best known for Muddulakshmi.
- Dhruvanth Talwar: Television actor, best known for Muddulakshmi.
- Rakshita Shetty: Social media influencer and vlogger.
- Karibasappa: Fitness enthusiast and body builder, winner of Mr. India and International Body Building Gold awards.
- Maalu Nipanal: Folk and playback singer, best known for "Hitalaka Karibyada Mava" from Karataka Damanaka.
- Spandana Somanna: Model and television actress, best known for Karimani.
- Ashwini Gowda: Actress and Pro-Kannada activist.
- RJ Amit Pawar: Radio jockey and content creator.

=== Wildcard entrants ===
- Raghavendra Hondadakeri(Raghu): A international powerlifter, coach, entrepreneur and also an actor in kannada film industry. He is a Kreeda Ratna awardee, honored by the Government of Karnataka for representing India in various international Powerlifting and strongman competitions.
- Risha Gowda: Model and actress who won Miss Mysore 2019 and Miss Karnataka 2020.
- Suraj Singh: Engineer, model, chef and fitness enthusiast from Mysuru. Also was in Canada training as chef.

=== Guest entrants ===
- Rajath: one of the contestant of Bigboss season 11, got the opportunity for the mid-season stint as Wild Card entry.
- Chaithra Kundapur: one of the contestant of Bigboss season 11, also got the midseason stint as Wild Card entry.

== Twists ==
=== Onti or Janti twist ===
Upon entrance of each housemate, the live audience voted for housemates to either enter as solo ("onti") or as duo ("janti"). A housemate should received 75% or above to enter as Solo housemate. On Day 15, the duo housemates twist was ended and all housemates were solo housemates.

Housemate No.	Housemate	Live audience vote		Entered as	Formed duo on Day 1
Housemate No.	Housemate	Onti (Solo)	Janti (Duo)	Entered as	Formed duo on Day 1
1	Sudhir	81%	19%	Solo Housemate	—N/a
2	Kavya	51%	49%	Duo Housemate with Gilli	—N/a
3	Satish	58%	42%	Duo Housemate with Chandra	—N/a
4	Gilli	73%	27%	Duo Housemate with Kavya	—N/a
5	Jahnvi	76%	24%	Solo Housemate	—N/a
6	Dhanush	78%	22%	Solo Housemate	—N/a
7	Chandra	64%	36%	Duo Housemate with Satish	—N/a
8	Manju	73%	27%	Duo Housemate with Rashika	—N/a
9	Rashika	48%	52%	Duo Housemate with Manju	—N/a
10	Abhishek	58%	42%	Duo Housemate with Ashvini S	—N/a
11	Mallamma	78%	22%	Solo Housemate	—N/a
12	Ashvini S	60%	40%	Duo Housemate with Abhishek	—N/a
13	Dhruvanth	76%	24%	Solo Housemate	—N/a
14	Rakshita	53%	47%	Not selected Housemate	Evicted by Housemates
15	Karibasappa	74%	26%	Duo Housemate with Amith	—N/a
16	Malu	72%	28%	Not selected Housemate	Duo Housemate with Spandana
17	Spandana	68%	32%	Not selected Housemate	Duo Housemate with Malu
18	Ashwini G	77%	23%	Solo Housemate	—N/a
19	Amith	57%	43%	Duo Housemate with Karibasappa	—N/a

== Nomination table ==
#BBK12	Week 1		Week 2		Week 3		First Finale	Week 4	Week 5	Week 6	Week 7	Week 8	Week 9	Week 10	Week 11	Week 12	Week 13	Week 14	Week 15		WEEK 16 GRAND FINALE WEEK				
#BBK12	Day 1	Day 4	Day 8	Day 10	Day 15	Day 18	First Finale	Week 4	Week 5	Week 6	Week 7	Week 8	Week 9	Week 10	Week 11	Week 12	Week 13	Week 14	Day 99	Day 100	WEEK 16 GRAND FINALE WEEK				
Contenders for Finalist	None		Chandraprabha & Satish; Dhanush; Mallamma; Sudhir		Ashwini G Malu & Spandana	Rashika; Gilli; Kavya	Nominees for Captaincy	None	Raghu; Risha	Dhanush; Raghu	Abhishek; Jhanvi; Kavya; Malu; Raghu; Risha	Raghu; Jhanvi	Abhishek; Ashwini G	Abhishek; Dhanush; Raghu; Suraj; Spandana	Raghu & Ashwini G Abhishek & Spandana; Malu & Rakshita	Ashwini G Gilli; Kavya; Suraj; Rashika	Gilli; Kavya; Raghu; Suraj	Ashwini; Gilli	Ashwini G Dhanush; Gilli; Rashika		No; Captain				
Finalists	None		Sudhir		Sudhir		House Captain	None	Raghu	Dhanush	Malu	Raghu	Abhishek	Dhanush	~~Abhishek~~ & ~~Spandana~~; Chaitra	Rashika	Kavya	Gilli	Dhanush		No; Captain				
Finalists	None		Sudhir		Ashwini G		House Captain	None	Raghu	Dhanush	Malu	Raghu	Abhishek	Dhanush	~~Abhishek~~ & ~~Spandana~~; Chaitra	Rashika	Kavya	Gilli	Dhanush		No; Captain				
Finalists	None		Sudhir		Malu & Spandana	Malu	House Captain	None	Raghu	Dhanush	Malu	Raghu	Abhishek	Dhanush	~~Abhishek~~ & ~~Spandana~~; Chaitra	Rashika	Kavya	Gilli	Dhanush		No; Captain				
Finalists	None		Sudhir		Malu & Spandana	Rashika	House Captain	None	Raghu	Dhanush	Malu	Raghu	Abhishek	Dhanush	~~Abhishek~~ & ~~Spandana~~; Chaitra	Rashika	Kavya	Gilli	Dhanush		No; Captain				
Finalist's Nomination	None		Ashwini G Jhanvi; Malu & Spandana; Rakshita; Abhishek & Ashvini S Dhanush; Manju & Rashika		No; Nominations		Captain's Nomination	None	Rashika; Risha; Ashwini G Dhruvanth; Dhanush; Gilli; Malu; Mallamma	No; Nominations	Dhruvanth; Rakshita; Ashwini G Rashika; Jhanvi; Sudhir; Raghu	Rakshita (to evict)	Raghu (to evict)	Not eligible	Not eligible	Chaitra; Malu; Ashwini G Spandana; Dhanush; Rajat	Ashwini G Rakshitha; Dhruvanth; Raghu; Malu	Ashwini G Dhanush; Dhruvanth; Rashika; Spandana	Dhruvanth (to evict)		No; Captain				
Vote to:	Evict			none			Vote to:	Evict	none			Evict				none	Evict	Evict	Ticket to Finale	Evict	none		GRAND FINALE		
Gilli	Not eligible	Ashwini G Amith & Karibasappa	Jhanvi; Malu & Spandana	Left (Day 10)	Nominated	Nominated	Moved to Next Level (Day 21)	Dhruvanth; Ashwini G	Nominated	Nominated	Not eligible	Abhishek; Dhanush	Jhanvi; Ashwini G	Rakshita; Rashika	Ashwini; Dhruvanth; Rashika; Rajat	Not eligible	Spandana; Malu; Dhanush; Suraj	Not eligible	Lost Ticket to Finale (Nominated)	Ashwini G Raghu	Nominated	Nominated	Finalist		Winner
Rakshita	Nominated	Evicted by Housemates (Day 1)	Jhanvi; Gilli & Kavya	Left (Day 10)	Nominated	Nominated	Moved to Next Level (Day 21)	Rashika; Jhanvi	Not eligible	Nominated	Nominated	Risha; Dhruvanth	Kavya; Gilli	Gilli; Kavya	Not eligible	Secret Room (Days 77-80)	Dhruvanth; Spandana; Dhanush; Rashika	Not eligible	Lost Ticket to Finale (Nominated)	Ashwini G Rashika	Nominated	Nominated	Finalist		1st Runner-up
Ashwini G	Rakshita	Jhanvi; Amith & Karibasappa	Dhruvanth; Abhishek & Ashvini S	Left (Day 10)	Finalist		Moved to Next Level (Day 21)	Gilli; Spandana	Nominated	Nominated	Nominated	Spandana; Risha	Dhruvanth; Malu	Kavya; Abhishek	Not eligible	Nominated	Spandana; Malu	Nominated	Lost Ticket to Finale (Nominated)	Gilli; Kavya	Nominated	Nominated	Finalist		2nd Runner-up
Kavya	Not eligible	Ashwini G Amith & Karibasappa	Jhanvi; Malu & Spandana	Left (Day 10)	Nominated	Nominated	Moved to Next Level (Day 21)	Ashwini G Rashika	Not eligible	Nominated	Not eligible	Abhishek; Malu	Jhanvi; Ashwini G	Rakshita; Rashika	Gilli; Rajat	Not eligible	House; Captain	Not eligible	Lost Ticket to Finale (Nominated)	Ashwini G Raghu	Nominated	Nominated	Finalist		3rd Runner - up
Raghu	Not in House						Entered (Day 21)	Jhanvi; Gilli	House; Captain	Nominated	Nominated	House; Captain	Nominated	Dhruvanth; Gilli	Dhruvanth	Not eligible	Spandana; Suraj; Rashika	Not eligible	Lost Ticket to Finale (Nominated)	Ashwini G Kavya	Nominated	Nominated	Finalist		4th Runner - up
Dhanush	Rakshita	Sudhir; Amith & Karibasappa	Mallamma; Malu & Spandana	Left (Day 10)	Nominated	Nominated	Moved to Next Level (Day 21)	Ashwini G Jhanvi	Nominated	House; Captain	Not eligible	Rakshita; Malu	Ashwini G Dhruvanth	House; Captain	Rakshitha; Gilli; Rashika; Dhruvanth; Rajat	Nominated	Raghu; Rashika	Nominated	Won Ticket to Finale (Saved)	House; Captain	Immune	Nominated	Finalist		5th Runner-up
Dhruvanth	Rakshita	Dhanush; Abhishek & Ashvini S	Jhanvi; Malu & Spandana	Left (Day 10)	Nominated	Nominated	Moved to Next Level (Day 21)	Gilli; Dhanush	Nominated	Nominated	Nominated	Abhishek; Malu	Ashwini G Jhanvi	Abhishek; Suraj	Gilli; Rakshitha; Rajat	Secret Room (Days 77-80)	Spandana; Raghu; Malu; Dhanush; Suraj; Rashika; Gilli	Nominated	Lost Ticket to Finale (Nominated)	Raghu; Rakshita	Nominated	Evicted (Day 108)			
Rashika	Not eligible	Mallamma; Amith & Karibasappa	Jhanvi; Chandraprabha & Satish	Left (Day 10)	Nominated	Finalist	Moved to Next Level (Day 21)	Kavya; Rakshita	Nominated	Nominated	Nominated	Dhruvanth; Spandana	Dhruvanth; Kavya	Spandana; Kavya	Gilli	House; Captain	Dhruvanth; Spandana; Raghu; Dhanush; Gilli	Nominated	Lost Ticket to Finale (Nominated)	Rakshita; Ashwini G	Evicted (Day 105)				
Spandana	Nominated	Sudhir; Amith & Karibasappa	Jhanvi; Chandraprabha & Satish	Left (Day 10)	Finalist	Nominated	Moved to Next Level (Day 21)	Ashwini G Jhanvi	Not eligible	Nominated	Not eligible	Risha; Rashika	Dhruvanth; Malu	Dhruvanth; Rashika	Rakshitha; Rajat	Nominated	Raghu; Malu; Dhanush; Rashika	Nominated	Evicted (Day 98)						
Malu	Nominated	Sudhir; Amith & Karibasappa	Jhanvi; Chandraprabha & Satish	Left (Day 10)	Finalist		Moved to Next Level (Day 21)	Gilli; Ashwini G	Nominated	Nominated	House; Captain	Suraj; Rashika	Ashwini G Suraj	Gilli; Dhruvanth	Spandana	Nominated	Raghu; Suraj; Rashika; Gilli	Evicted (Day 91)							
Suraj	Not in House						Entered (Day 21)	Dhruvanth; Gilli	Not eligible	Nominated	Not eligible	Dhruvanth; Abhishek	Jhanvi; Malu	Gilli; Spandana	Gilli; Rajath; Rakshita	Not eligible	Dhruvanth; Raghu; Dhanush	Evicted (Day 90)							
Rajat	Not in House												Entered as Guest (Day 58)	Exempt	Ashwini; Dhruvanth; Suraj	Nominated	Left as a Guest (Day 84)								
Chaitra	Not in House												Entered as Guest (Day 58)	Exempt	House; Captain	Nominated	Left as a Guest (Day 84)								
Abhishek	Not eligible	Sudhir; Amith & Karibasappa	Jhanvi; Chandraprabha & Satish	Left (Day 10)	Nominated	Nominated	Moved to Next Level (Day 21)	Jhanvi; Ashwini G	Not eligible	Nominated	Not eligible	Risha; Suraj	House; Captain	Dhruvanth; Rakshita	Evicted (Day 70)										
Jhanvi	Rakshita	Sudhir; Amith & Karibasappa	Dhruvanth; Manju & Rashika	Left (Day 10)	Nominated	Nominated	Moved to Next Level (Day 21)	Gilli; Rakshita	Not eligible	Nominated	Nominated	Abhishek; Malu	Dhruvanth; Gilli	Evicted (Day 63)											
Risha	Not in House						Entered (Day 21)	Spandana; Jhanvi	Nominated	Nominated	Nominated	Malu; Abhishek	Evicted (Day 56)												
Sudhir	Rakshita	Dhanush; Gilli & Kavya; Mallamma	Finalist	Left (Day 10)	Finalist		Winner (Day 21)	Dhruvanth; Rashika	Not eligible	Nominated	Nominated	Evicted (Day 49)													
Chandraprabha	Not eligible	Dhanush; Abhishek & Ashvini S	Jhanvi; Malu & Spandana	Left (Day 10)	Nominated	Nominated	Moved to Next Level (Day 21)	Ashwini G Jhanvi	Not eligible	Nominated	Evicted (Day 42)														
Mallamma	Rakshita	Dhanush; Gilli & Kavya	Jhanvi; Manju & Rashika	Left (Day 10)	Nominated	Nominated	Moved to Next Level (Day 21)	Gilli; Ashwini G	Nominated	Evicted (Day 35)															
Ashvini S	Not eligible	Sudhir; Amith & Karibasappa	Jhanvi; Chandraprabha & Satish	Left (Day 10)	Nominated	Nominated	Rejected (Day 21)	Evicted (Day 21)																	
Manju	Not eligible	Sudhir; Amith & Karibasappa	Jhanvi; Chandraprabha & Satish	Left (Day 10)	Nominated	Nominated	Rejected (Day 21)	Evicted (Day 21)																	
Satish	Not eligible	Dhanush; Abhishek & Ashvini S	Jhanvi; Malu & Spandana	Left (Day 10)	Nominated	Evicted (Day 18)																			
Amith	Not eligible	Dhanush; Gilli & Kavya	Evicted (Day 7)																						
Karibasappa	Not eligible	Dhanush; Gilli & Kavya	Evicted (Day 7)																						
Notes	1	2, 3	2, 4, 6	5	6, 7, 8	9	10	-	9, 11, 12	9, 13	12, 14	15, 16	17	18, 19	20, 21, 22	12									
Against Public Vote	Malu; Rakshita; Spandana	Abhishek & Ashvini S Amith & Karibasappa; Dhanush; Gilli & Kavya; Mallamma; ~~Sudhir~~	Abhishek & Ashvini S Ashwini G Dhanush; Jhanvi; Malu & Spandana; Manju & Rashika; Rakshita		Abhishek; Ashvini S Chandraprabha; Dhanush; Dhruvanth; Gilli; Jhanvi; Kavya; Mallamma; Manju; Rakshita; ~~Rashika~~; Satish	Abhishek; Ashvini S Chandraprabha; Dhanush; Dhruvanth; Gilli; Jhanvi; Kavya; Mallamma; Manju; Spandana		Ashwini G Dhruvanth; Gilli; Jhanvi; Rakshita; Rashika; Spandana	Ashwini G Dhanush; Dhruvanth; Gilli; Mallamma; Malu; Rashika; Risha	Ashwini G Chandraprabha; Dhanush; Dhruvanth; Gilli; Rakshita; Rashika; Spandana; Sudhir; Suraj	Ashwini G Dhruvanth; Jhanvi; Raghu; Rakshita; Rashika; Risha; Sudhir	Abhishek; Ashwini G Dhruvanth; Jhanvi; Malu; Rakshita; Rashika; Risha; Spandana; Suraj	Ashwini G Dhruvanth; Gilli; Jhanvi; Kavya; Malu; Raghu	Abhishek; Dhruvanth; Gilli; Kavya; Malu; Rakshita; Rashika; Spandana; Suraj	Ashwini G Dhruvanth; Gilli; Rajat; Rakshita; Rashika; Spandana	Ashwini G Chaitra; Dhanush; Malu; Rajat; Spandana	Ashwini G Dhanush; Dhruvanth; Gilli; Malu; Raghu; Rakshita; Rashika; Spandana; Suraj	Ashwini G Dhanush; Dhruvanth; Rashika; Spandana	Ashwini G Dhruvanth; Gilli; Kavya; Raghu; Rakshita; Rashika		Ashwini G Dhruvanth; Gilli; Kavya; Raghu; Rakshita	Ashwini G Dhanush; Gilli; Kavya; Raghu; Rakshita			
Evicted	Rakshita	Amith & Karibasappa	No; Eviction		Satish	Ashvini S		No; Eviction	Mallamma	Chandraprabha	Sudhir	Risha	Jhanvi	Abhishek	Rajath and Chaitra (Guests)		Suraj	Spandana	Rashika		Dhruvanth	Dhanush	Raghu		
Evicted	Rakshita	Amith & Karibasappa	No; Eviction		Satish	Manju		No; Eviction	Mallamma	Chandraprabha	Sudhir	Risha	Jhanvi	Abhishek	Rajath and Chaitra (Guests)		Malu	Spandana	Rashika		Dhruvanth	Kavya	Ashwini	Rakshita	Gilli

indicates that the Housemate was directly nominated for eviction.
indicates that the Housemate was immune prior to nominations.
indicates the contestant has been evicted.
indicates the contestant walked out due to emergency.
indicates the contestant has been ejected.
indicates the house captain.

=== Nomination notes ===
- ^1: During premiere, Malu, Rakshita & Spandana were left not selected by fellow housemates, and thus were nominated. Fellow housemates(only solo housemates) had to mutually decide to evict one nominated housemate. They chose Rakshita.
- ^2: In this week's nominations, housemates had to nominate one solo housemate and one duo housemate.
- ^3: On Day 5, finalist contenders - Chandra & Satish, Dhanush, Mallamma and Sudhir competed for Immunity. Sudhir won the Finalist task and secured his safety from that week’s eviction. He also had to name a replacement nominee, he chose to nominate Mallamma.
- ^4: On Day 9, Finalist Sudhir had power to directly nominated one housemate. He chose Ashwini G. In Week 2, the nomination process, Finalist Sudhir had to nominate three solo housemates and three duo housemates. Only his nominees for final nominations for eviction.
- ^5: On Day 10, the show was suspended due to violations of environmental regulations at the premises, and the housemates were temporarily evacuated. In the early hours of Day 11, they re-entered the house.
- ^6: On Day 14, Host Sudeepa revealed that out of the nominated housemates, Malu & Spandana received the most votes and become Finalists.
- ^7: In week 3 nominations, all non-finalist housemates were nominated as individual housemates.
- ^8: On Day 18, Satish was evicted in a mid-week Eviction.
- ^9: Voting lines were open for all housemates.
- ^10: As part of the First Final, Sudhir was announced as the Winner, while Ashvini S and Manju were Rejected and evicted. The remaining housemates advanced to the next level of the season. Meanwhile, Raghu, Risha, and Suraj entered the house.
- ^11: Only the three new housemates were eligible to compete as the first Captaincy contenders.
- ^12: Only the Captain was eligible to nominate.
- ^13: Housemates competed for safety. Abhishek, Jhanvi, Kavya, Malu, Raghu and Risha were saved.
- ^14: Risha was directly nominated.
- ^15: Ashwini G and Jhanvi were directly nominated.
- ^16: At the end of nominations, Captain Raghu had the special power to directly nominate one housemate.
- ^17: At the start of nominations, Captain Abhishek had the special power to directly nominate one housemate, which also made that housemate ineligible in the nomination process.
- ^18: Malu was directly nominated.
- ^19: As wild-cards, Chaitra and Rajat were exempt from this week's nominations.
- ^20: Abhishek & Spandana became the first pair captain.
- ^20: After Abhishek was evicted, Spandana became the solo Captain. Eventually, on Day 72, Spandana was replaced by Chaitra as Captain after Chaitra chose the Yellow Buzzer, which Bigg Boss introduced under the concept of “Villain.”
- ^21: Captain Chaitra had the power to assign each housemate a number from 0 to 5. Housemates could nominate as many housemates as the number given to them by the Captain. Ashwini and Rakshitha received 0, meaning they did not have the power to nominate anyone.
- ^22: Dhruvanth and Rakshita were fake evicted and moved to Secret Room.
