= Gilli Nata =

Indian actor

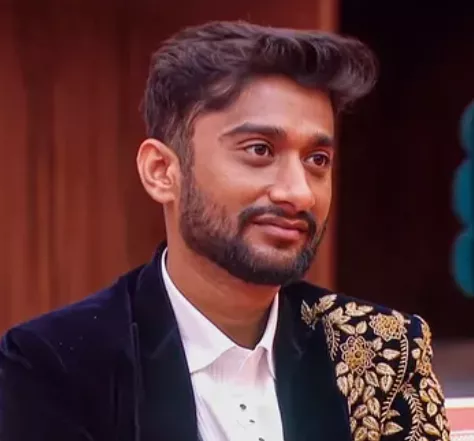
- Gilli Nata in 2026
- Born: Malavalli Nataraj; June 21, 1998 (age 28); Dadadapura, Malavalli, Mandya, Karnataka, India
- Occupation: Actor
- Years active: 2022–present
- Known for: Winner of Bigg Boss Kannada (season 12)

Malavalli Nataraj (born 21 June 1998), more popularly known as Gilli Nata, is an Indian actor and television personality working in Kannada entertainment industry. He began his career working as set assistant and in art departments for films. Gilli's breakthrough came in 2022 with Comedy Khiladigalu season 4, a humour television reality show, where he finished as the first runner-up. Following this, he featured in the dance reality show, Dance Karnataka Dance and won the Best Entertainer Award. He made his film debut in 2024 with Langoti Man and later featured in a small role in Darshan's The Devil (2025).

Gilli's biggest success came through the reality show Bigg Boss Kannada (season 12) (2025–26), where he emerged as the winner.

== Early life ==
Gilli was born as Malavalli Nataraj on 21 June 1998 in a humble farmer family of Kullaiah and Savitha in Dadadapura village of Malavalli Taluk in Mandya district. He completed his schooling in Mandya and later pursued a two-year ITI course.. He migrated to Bengaluru dreaming of making it big in the entertainment industry. During his initial days in Bengaluru, he struggled financially and did not have proper rooms to stay in. To support himself, he worked in hotels, and later took up small assignments as a set assistant while working in the art departments for various film projects.

== Career ==
=== Short films ===
Before entering television and mainstream films, Gilli made several YouTube short films as an actor, director and scriptwriter. Many of these short films gained popularity online, and he was praised for his long-stretch dialogue delivery, helping him gain early recognition among audiences.

=== Television ===
Gilli Nata began gaining public recognition through his participation in Comedy Khiladigalu Season 4 (2022), where he finished as the first runner-up. He went on to participate in Bharjari Bachelors. He later appeared in Dance Karnataka Dance.

In January 2026, Gilli Nata reached a major milestone in his television career by emerging as the winner of Bigg Boss Kannada. The grand finale aired on January 18, 2026, where he was declared the winner, taking home a cash prize of ₹50 lakh along with a Maruti Suzuki car. He also created history by receiving over 55 crore votes, the highest vote count ever recorded in the history of Bigg Boss across all Indian languages.

=== Films ===
Gilli's first film appearance was in a comedy role in the film Dhamaka (2022). This was followed by small budget films such as Langoti Man (2024), 1st Day 1st Show (2025) and Super Hit (2026). He had a short role in The Devil.

On 21 June 2026, Gilli announced his upcoming film Palar, which is set to mark his debut as a lead actor. The film is being presented by KVN Productions.

== Filmography ==
Key
†	Denotes films that have not yet been released

Year	Title	Role	Ref
2023	Dhamaka		
2024	Langoti Man		
2024	Kaalapatthar		
2025	1st Day 1st Show		
2025	The Devil		
2026	Chowkidar		
2026	Hayagrriva		
2026	Super Hit		
2026	Sarkari Shaale H8		
2026	Palar †		

Preceded by Hanumantha Lamani (2024)	Bigg Boss Kannada Winner (Series 12) 2025	Succeeded by TBA (2026)
