= Bigg Boss 13 =

Bigg Boss 13 is the thirteenth season of various versions of Bigg Boss (an Indian adaptation of the reality game show Big Brother):

- Bigg Boss (Hindi TV series) season 13
- Bigg Boss Kannada season 13

== See also ==
- Big Brother 13 (disambiguation)
- Bigg Boss (disambiguation)
- Bigg Boss 11 (disambiguation)
- Bigg Boss 12 (disambiguation)
- BB13 (disambiguation)
