= BB13 =

BB13 may refer to:

- Big Brother 13 (disambiguation), a television show
- USS Virginia (BB-13), a United States Navy battleship
