= Bhavya (given name) =

Bhavya is a unisex given name. Notable people with the name include:

- Bhavya Bishnoi, Indian politician
- Bhavya Gandhi, Indian actor
- Bhavya Gowda, Indian model
- Bhavya Patel, Indian actress
- Bhavya Trikha, Indian actress
