= Bharjari Bachelors =

Kannada reality show

- Genre: Reality show
- Presented by: Akul Balaji (Season 1)
- Judges: V. Ravichandran; Rachita Ram
- Country of origin: India
- Original language: Kannada
- No. of seasons: 2
- No. of episodes: 32

Production
- Production location: Karnataka
- Camera setup: Multi-camera
- Running time: Approx. 60-75 minutes per episode.

Original release
- Network: Zee Kannada
- Release: 24 June 2023

Bharjari Bachelors is a reality show that focuses on addressing the challenges faced by adolescent boys who are at the age of marriage in society. The program is aired on Zee Kannada.

The primary objective of "Bharjari Bachelors" is to provide a platform for young men to showcase their personalities, talents, and readiness for marriage. Throughout the show, the bachelors participate in various tasks, activities, and challenges that are designed to test their skills, emotional intelligence, and compatibility with potential life partners.

== Overview ==
The show aims to bring together selected bachelors from Karnataka and help them navigate the transition from bachelorhood to a stage where they become eligible for marriage. The program likely features a mix of entertaining and engaging elements, including personal interview, group activities, and interactions with experts in relationship counseling and marriage. The contestants are expected to confront and overcome obstacles that are commonly faced by individuals entering the marriage phase of their lives.

== Judges ==
Ravichandran is described as the "crazy star". He is popular and well-known actor in the region. Known for his romantic roles and ability to connect with the audience, Ravichandran has gained a reputation for teaching love lessons and creating a world of love for teenagers. In the show, he takes on the role of a love guru, offering guidance and teasing the boys as they navigate their journey towards marriage.

Rachitha Ram is referred to as the "Dimple Queen", suggesting that she is an actress known for her charm and captivating presence. She is described as the dream girl of the bachelors. indicating that she is admired and adored by the participants on the show.

== Contestants ==
Bharjari Bachelors Pair
Contestant	Mentor
Gilli Nata	Yashaswini
Hanumantha Lamani	Asiya Begum
Rudra	Asha
Rakesh	Arohi Naina
Raghavendra	Asha Gouda
Jaggappa	Lasya Nagaraj
Manohar	Sanjana
Nawaz	Amoolya
Suraj	Aishwarya
Umesh Kinnal	Rashmi
