= Bigg Boss Kannada season 11 =

Eleventh season of the reality TV series Bigg Boss Kannada

Bigg Boss Kannada
- Season 11
- Logo for Bigg Boss Kannada Season 11
- Presented by: Kiccha Sudeepa
- No. of days: 120
- No. of housemates: 20
- Winner: Hanumantha
- Runner-up: Trivikram
- No. of episodes: 120

Release
- Original network: Colors Kannada; JioCinema
- Original release: 29 September 2024 – 26 January 2025

Series chronology
- ← Previous; Season 10 Next → Season 12

Bigg Boss Kannada 11 is a reality show and the eleventh season of the Indian Kannada-language reality television series Bigg Boss produced by Banijay. The show began on 29 September 2024, on Colors Kannada and JioCinema, with Kichcha Sudeep as a host for the eleventh time in a row. Initially reported to be the last season to be hosted by Sudeep, it was reported that he retracted from his decision and expressed his willingness to return for the next season. The premiere episode had a 9.9 TRP beating the previous season record. The season also became the longest running season of Bigg Boss Kannada, running for 120 days. Hanumantha Lamani, a wild card entrant, won the Bigg Boss Kannada Season 11 trophy.

== Telecast ==
The Bigg Boss season 11 is telecasted on Colors Kannada TV nightly and live on JioCinema OTT platform including previously broadcast episodes.

== Housemates status ==
S.No	Housemates	Day entered	Day Exited	Housemates status
1	Hanumantha	Day 21	Day 120	Winner
2	Trivikram	Day 0	Day 120	1st Runner-up
3	Rajath	Day 50	Day 120	2nd Runner-Up
4	Mokshita	Day 0	Day 120	3rd Runner-Up
5	Manju	Day 0	Day 120	4th Runner-Up
6	Bhavya	Day 0	Day 119	5th Runner-Up
7	Dhanraj	Day 0	Day 112	Evicted
8	Gouthami	Day 0	Day 111	Evicted
9	Chaitra	Day 0	Day 105	Evicted
10	Aishwarya	Day 0	Day 91	Evicted
11	Suresh	Day 0	Day 77	Walked
12	Shishir	Day 0	Day 77	Evicted
13	Shobha	Day 50	Day 63	Walked
14	Dharma	Day 0	Day 56	Evicted
15	Anusha	Day 0	Day 49	Evicted
16	Manasa	Day 0	Day 35	Evicted
17	Hamsa	Day 0	Day 28	Evicted
18	Ranjith	Day 0	Day 17	Ejected
19	Jagadish	Day 0	Day 17	Ejected
20	Yamuna	Day 0	Day 7	Evicted

== Nominations table ==
BBK 11	Week 1	Week 2	Week 3	Week 4	Week 5	Week 6	Week 7	Week 8	Week 9	Week 10	Week 11	Week 12	Week 13	Week 14	Week 15	Day (100-104)	Week 16		Week 17 GRAND FINALE		
Nominees for Captaincy	No; Captain	Aishwarya; Bhavya; Hamsa; Manju; Trivikram; Yamuna	Chaithra; Gouthami; Shishir	All; Housemates	Anusha; Aishwarya; Chaitra; Dharma; Dhanraj; Gouthami; Hanumantha; Manju; Mokshita; Shishir; Suresh	No; Nominees	Bhavya; Trivikram	Bhavya; Gouthami	Hanumantha; Chaitra; Manju; Rajat; Shobha	Aishwarya; Bhavya; Dhanraj; Gouthami; Manju; Suresh	Gouthami; Shishir	Aishwarya; Bhavya; Hanumantha; Rajath; Shishir; Suresh	Aishwarya; Bhavya	Bhavya; Dhanraj; Mokshitha; Rajath; Trivikram	Rajath; Gouthami; Chaithra; Trivikram; Manju; Hanumantha		Rajath; Trivikram; Bhavya; Hanumantha		No; Captain		
House; Captain	No; Captain	Hamsa	Shishir	Aishwarya & Trivikram	Hanumantha		Trivikram	Bhavya	Manju	Dhanraj	Gouthami	~~Suresh~~	Bhavya		Rajath		Hanumantha		No; Captain		
Captain's Nomination	No; Captain	Not eligible		Manasa Manju	Not eligible			Hanumantha (To Evict)	Power to Accept/decline Housemates Nominations	Power to decide ranking of housemates	Mokshita (To Evict)	Not eligible	Aishwarya (To evict)	Not eligible	Bhavya; Chaitra; Gouthami; Hanumantha; Mokshitha (Ticket To Home)		Mokshita (To Save)		No; Captain		
Jail Nominations	None		Chaithra	None		Dhanraj; Suresh	Dhanraj	Rajath	Shobha	Chaithra	Trivikram Chaithra	Chaithra	Hanumantha	None	Manju		None				
Vote to:	Evict	none	Evict	Evict	Evict	Evict	Evict	Evict	Evict	Evict	Evict	Evict	Evict	Evict	Evict	Ticket To Finale	Mid-week Evict	Evict	Saturday Eviction	FINALE	
Hanumantha	Not In; House			Hamsa Suresh	House; Captain		Nominated	Chaitra; Dharma; ~~Aishwarya~~	Shobha; Suresh	Rajath; Suresh	Rajath; Trivikram	Nominated	Mokshita; Chaitra	No; Nominations	Saved	Won TTF	House; Captain		Nominated		Winner (Day 120)
Trivikram	Chaithra	Nominated	Saved	Co-House Captain	Saved	Nominated	House Captain	~~Dharma~~; Gouthami; Manju	Mokshitha; Aishwarya	Mokshitha; Chaitra	Chaitra; Hanumantha	Nominated	Hanumantha; Gouthami	No; Nominations	Nominated	Lost TTF	Nominated	Manju; Gouthami; Bhavya	Nominated		1st Runner-Up (Day 120)
Rajath	Not In; House							Not eligible	Shobha shishir	Manju; Suresh	Dhanraj; Hanumantha	Nominated	Chaitra; Gouthami	No; Nominations	House Captain	Lost TTF	Nominated	Manju; Dhanraj; Bhavya	Nominated		2nd Runner-Up (Day 120)
Mokshitha	Not eligible	Saved	Nominated	Chaithra Dhanraj	Nominated	Nominated	Nominated	Chaitra; ~~Dhanraj~~; Manju	Trivikram; Bhavya	Manju; Gouthami	Trivikram; Bhavya	Nominated	Hanumantha; Manju	No; Nominations	Nominated	Lost TTF	Nominated	Dhanraj; Manju; Gouthami	Nominated		3rd Runner-Up (Day 120)
Manju	Chaithra	Saved	Nominated	Hamsa Bhavya	Nominated	Saved	Nominated	Chaitra; ~~Dharma~~; Trivikram	House; Captain	Chaitra; Aishwarya	Dhanraj; Shishir	Saved	Trivikram; Dhanraj	No; Nominations	Saved	Lost TTF	Nominated	Rajath; Bhavya; Gouthami	Nominated		4th Runner-Up (Day 120)
Bhavya	Chaithra	Nominated	Saved	Gouthami Mokshitha	Nominated	Nominated	Nominated	House; Captain	Shishir; ~~Aishwarya~~	Chaitra; Mokshitha	Chaitra; Mokshitha	Saved	House; Captain		Nominated	Lost TTF	Nominated	Trivikram; Manju; Gouthami	Nominated	5th Runner-Up (Day 119)	
Dhanraj	Chaithra	Nominated	Nominated	Suresh Chaithra	Nominated	Nominated	Nominated	Mokshitha; Trivikram; Dharma	Trivikram; Shobha	House; Captain	Rajath; Trivikram	Saved	Manju; Chaitra	No; Nominations	Nominated	Lost TTF	Saved	Manju; Mokshita; Rajath	Evicted (Day 112)		
Gouthami	Chaithra; Yamuna; Jagadish	Saved	Saved	Suresh Bhavya	Saved	Saved	Nominated	Chaitra; Dharma; Trivikram	Suresh; Shishir	Aishwarya; Shishir	House; Captain	Saved	Chaitra; Mokshita	No; Nominations	Saved	Lost TTF	Nominated	Evicted (Day 111)			
Chaithra	Not eligible	Saved	Saved	Mokshitha Suresh	Nominated	Nominated	Saved	Dharma; Manju; Trivikram	~~Rajath~~; ~~Suresh~~	Walked (Day 66) Trivikram; Bhavya	Secret Room (Day 70) Bhavya; Trivikram	Saved	Dhanraj; Gouthami	No; Nominations	Nominated	Lost TTF	Evicted (Day 105)				
Aishwarya	Chaithra	Nominated	Nominated	Co-House Captain	Nominated	Saved	Saved	Chaitra; ~~Gouthami~~; Manju	~~Trivikram~~; ~~Bhavya~~	Manju; Gouthami	Trivikram; Bhavya	Nominated	Trivikram; Chaitra	Evicted (Day 91)							
Suresh	Not eligible	Nominated	Nominated	Hamsa Chaithra	Nominated	Nominated	Nominated	~~Chaitra~~; Gouthami; Manju	~~Gouthami~~; ~~Rajath~~	Rajath; Hanumantha	Manju; Hanumantha	Walked (Day 77)									
Shishir	Not eligible	Saved	House; Captain	Chaithra Bhavya	Nominated	Saved	Nominated	Chaitra; Manju; ~~Dhanraj~~	~~Trivikram~~; ~~Rajath~~	Manju; Gouthami	Not eligible	Evicted (Day 77)									
Shobha	Not In; House							Not eligible	~~Rajath~~; ~~Gouthami~~	Walked (Day 63)											
Dharma	Chaithra; Bhavya; Hamsa	Nominated	Saved	Shishir Gouthami	Nominated	Nominated	Nominated	Trivikram; ~~Chaitra~~; Manju	Evicted (Day 56)												
Anusha	Not eligible	Nominated	Nominated	Suresh Shishir	Nominated	Saved	Nominated	Evicted (Day 49)													
Manasa	Not eligible	Nominated	Nominated	Mokshitha Gouthami	Nominated	Evicted (Day 35)															
Hamsa	Chaithra	House; Captain	Saved	Suresh Mokshitha	Evicted (Day 28)																
Jagadish	Chaithra	Nominated	Nominated	Ejected (Day 17)																	
Ranjith	Not eligible	Nominated	Saved	Ejected (Day 17)																	
Yamuna	Chaithra; Manju; Gouthami	Evicted (Day 7)																			
Against Public Vote	Bhavya; Chaithra; Gouthami; Hamsa; Jagadish; Manasa; ~~Manju~~; Mokshitha; Shishir; Yamuna	Aishwarya; Anusha; Bhavya; Dhanraj; Dharma; Hamsa; Jagadish; Manasa; Ranjith; Suresh; Trivikram	Aishwarya; Anusha; Dhanraj jagadish Manasa; Manju; Mokshitha; Suresh	Bhavya; Chaitra; Gouthami; Hamsa; Manju; Manasa; Mokshitha; Shishir; Suresh	Aishwarya; Anusha; Bhavya; Chaitra; Dharma; Dhanraj; Hanumantha; Manju; Manasa; Mokshitha; Suresh; Shishir	~~Anusha~~; Bhavya; Chaitra; Dharma; Dhanraj; Mokshitha; Suresh; Trivikram	Anusha; Bhavya; Dhanraj; Dharma; Gouthami; Hanumantha; Manju; Mokshitha; Suresh shishir	Chaitra; Dharma; Gouthami; Hanumantha; Manju; Mokshitha; Trivikram	Aishwarya; Bhavya; Chaitra; Shobha; Shishir; Suresh; Trivikram	Aishwarya; Bhavya; Chaitra; Gouthami; Manju; Mokshitha; Rajath; Suresh	Bhavya; Chaitra; Dhanraj; Hanumantha; Rajath; Mokshitha; Trivikram; Shishir	Aishwarya; Hanumantha; Mokshitha; Rajath; Trivikram	Aishwarya; Chaitra; Dhanraj; Gouthami; Hanumantha; Manju; Mokshitha; Trivikram	None	Bhavya; Chaitra; Dhanraj; Mokshitha; Trivikram		Bhavya; ~~Dhanraj~~; Gouthami; Manju; Mokshita; Rajath; Trivikram	Bhavya; Dhanraj; Gouthami; Manju; ~~Mokshita~~; Rajath	Bhavya; Hanumantha; Manju; Mokshita; Rajath; Trivikram	Hanumantha; Manju; Mokshita; Rajath; Trivikram	
Re-entered	None		None	None					None	Chaithra	None	None									
Secret Room	None		None	None					None	None	Chaithra	None									
Walked	None		None	None					Shobha	Chaithra	Suresh	None									
Ejected	None		Ranjith	None					None			None									
Ejected	None		Jagadish	None					None			None									
Evicted	Yamuna	Ranjith and Jagadish Lawyer		Hamsa	Manasa	No; Eviction	Anusha	Dharma	No; Eviction		Shishir	No; Eviction	Aishwarya	No; Eviction	Chaithra		Eviction; Suspended	Gouthami	Bhavya	Manju	Mokshita
Evicted	Yamuna	Ranjith and Jagadish Lawyer		Hamsa	Manasa	No; Eviction	Anusha	Dharma	No; Eviction		Shishir	No; Eviction	Aishwarya	No; Eviction	Chaithra		Eviction; Suspended	Dhanraj	Bhavya	Rajath	Trivikram
Evicted	Yamuna	Ranjith and Jagadish Lawyer		Hamsa	Manasa	No; Eviction	Anusha	Dharma	No; Eviction		Shishir	No; Eviction	Aishwarya	No; Eviction	Chaithra		Eviction; Suspended	Dhanraj	Bhavya	Hanumantha	

indicates that the Housemate was directly nominated for eviction.
indicates that the Housemate was immune prior to nominations.
indicates the contestant has been evicted.
indicates the contestant walked out due to emergency.
indicates the contestant has been ejected.
indicates the house captain.

== Production ==
=== Theme ===
Then theme of this year's Bigg Boss is "'A New chapter with Swarga and Naraka (Heaven and Hell)'" to celebrate the eleventh anniversary of Bigg Boss Kannada.

=== Eye logo ===
The season featured an orange Fire and blue water themed eye logo. The orange fire and Blue water, represents the two parts of the house, Swarga (Heaven) and Narka (Hell). The pupil of the eye is mixed of the blend of both orange Fire and Blue water.

=== Contestants ===
The show is sticking to the original format of the reality programme and it will have both celebrities and commoners who will be entering the house as contestants. However, in this season the contestants who entered the House were divided into two groups - one group of 7 contestants entering the naraka (Hell) section of the house and the other group of 10 contestants entering the swarga (Heaven) section of the house.

== Host ==
Kichcha Sudeep announced that he will be hosting Bigg Boss Kannada season 11 for the last time, stepping down after nearly 11 years of hosting. However, he took back his decision later and came back as the host for the next season.

== Controversy ==
The Oorganisers and the host of Bigg Boss season 11, received a police notice following a complaint about the violation of female contestants' privacy on the show. The notice was issued by Kumbalgodu police after the Karnataka State Women's Commission raised concerns about a controversial task in the house. Following this allegations, the concept of narka (Hell) and swarga (Heaven) was removed . The Narka (Hell) contestants have been relocated into standard house of Bigg Boss also known as Swarga (Heaven).

== Housemates ==
With the new concept of Hell and Heaven, this season has featured 17 contestants, originally entering the house on the grand opening day on September 29, 2024.

=== Original entrants ===
- Yamuna Srinidhi: Serial actress and classical dancer
- Bhavya Gowda: Actress and model, appeared in Geetha serial
- Dhanraj Acharya: YouTuber and social media influencer
- Gauthami Jadav: Serial actress, best known for her role as Sathya.
- Jagadeesh: Lawyer
- Dharma Keerthiraj: Actor and model
- Anusha Rai: Actress and model
- Shishir Shastry: Serial actor television personality and dancer
- Trivikram: Actor and fitness enthusiast
- Hamsa Prathap: Serial actress
- Tukali Manasa: Television personality
- Gold Suresh: Businessman
- Aishwarya Shindogi: Serial actress and model
- Chaitra Kundapura: Social activist
- Ugram Manju: Movie personality
- Mokshitha Pai: Serial actress
- Ranjith kumar: Actor, model and fitness enthusiast

=== Wild card entrants ===
- Hanumantha Lamani: Singer and Sa re ga ma pa Season 15 kannada 1st runner-up and a shepherd turned singer from Haveri district, Karnataka.
- Shobha Shetty: Television actress works in Telugu and Kannada, she was previously a contestant in Bigg Boss (Telugu TV series) season 7.
- Rajath Kishan: Kannada television actor and reality show personality.
