= Big Brother 13 =

Big Brother 13 is the thirteenth season of various versions of Big Brother and may refer to:

- Big Brother 13 (U.S.), the 2011 edition of the U.S. version of Big Brother
- Gran Hermano 13 (Spain), the 2012 edition of the Spain version of Big Brother
- Big Brother 13 (UK), the 2012 edition of the UK version of Big Brother
- Big Brother Brasil 13, the 2013 edition of the Brazil version of Big Brother
- Bigg Boss 13 (disambiguation)
  - Bigg Boss 13, thirteenth season of Big Brother in India in Hindi

== See also ==
- Big Brother (franchise)
- Big Brother (disambiguation)
