= Bhavya Gowda =

Indian model and actress

- Born: 26 February 1999 (age 27); Bangalore, Karnataka, India
- Occupation: Actress

Bhavya Gowda is an Indian television actress. She started her acting in the Geetha Serial in Colors Kannada and made her screen debut in Dear Kanmani. Currently, she is acting as one of the leads in popular kannada serial 'Karna' in Zee Kannada alongside Kiran Raj.

== Career ==
Bhavya started her acting career through geetha serial later she entered to the big boss kannada season 11. she is doing her big screen debut though devi movie directed by Prakash Kumar staring debutant chethan gowda.

== Television ==
Year	Program	Role	Language	Channel
2020-2024	Geetha (TV series)	Geetha	Kannada	Colors Kannada
2021-2023	Kalisi Unte Kaladu Sukham	Pooja	Telugu	Star Maa
2024-2025	Bigg Boss: Kannada season 11	Contestant (top 6)	Kannada	Colors Kannada
2025–present	Karna	Nidhi	Kannada	Zee Kannada
