= Geetha (TV series) =

Kannada language TV drama series

- Genre: Drama
- Created by: Mahesh Rao
- Screenplay by: mahesh Rao; Coffee Raghavendra
- Directed by: K.S. Ramji
- Starring: Dhanush Gowda; Bhavya Gowda
- Voices of: Lokesh
- Composer: Karthik Sharma
- Country of origin: India
- Original language: Kannada
- No. of episodes: 1107

Production
- Producer: Vimala N.
- Production location: Bengaluru
- Cinematography: Ravikumar
- Editor: Mahadev
- Camera setup: Multi-camera
- Running time: 22 minutes
- Production company: Gagana Enterprises

Original release
- Network: Colors Kannada
- Release: 6 January 2020 – 9 March 2024

Geetha is an Indian television drama in the Kannada language that premiered on Colors Kannada from 6 January 2020. It stars Dhanush Gowda and Bhavya Gowda in the lead roles. The show is produced by Gagana Enterprises and is directed by K.S.Ramji.

== Plot ==
Geetha, a college-going, lower-middle-class girl wants to make it big in her life on her own, but she faces hurdles from Vijay, who hails from a rich family, studying in the same college. Vijay is a son of a minister who respects women, but his son Vijay is quite opposite to him. An arrogant Vijay studies in the college-owned by his father, and he gets caught red-handedly for malpractice in the college. Geetha decides to complain to college authorities, which earns her the wrath of Vijay, who leaves no stone unturned to spoil Geetha's life. He even abducts Geetha to tarnish her image. Geetha claims in front of the media that Vijay has married her and her life takes different turn after her marriage. This forms the rest of the story.

== Cast ==
=== Main ===
- Dhanush Gowda as Vijay; son of Minister Surya Prakash and Sudharani, Bhanumathi´s Stepson and Geetha's cousin & Husband
- Bhavya Gowda as Geetha; A flower selling girl and Vijay's cousin & wife

=== Recurring ===
- Sharmitha Gowda as Bhanumathi; Minister Surya Prakash's Second wife and Vijay's Stepmother; Shruthi's mother
- Vijay Shobraj as Sithara; Bhanumathi's brother, Shruthi's uncle, Vijay's stepuncle
- Ashwath Neenasam as Sreenivas; Geetha's adoptive father
- Amrutha Roopesh as Susheela; Geetha's adoptive mother
- Nisarga as Sync Smitha; Geetha's college mate
- Jyesta as Kiran; Vijay's friend
- Unknown as Minister Surya Prakash; Bhanumathi and Sudharani's husband; Vijay and Shruthi's father; Chandrika's brother; Geetha´s maternal uncle
- Arathi Kulkarni as Sudharani; Minister Surya Prakash's first wife; Vijay's mother; Shruthi's stepmother
- Rekha Sagar as Chandrika; Minister Surya Prakash's sister; Vijay and Shruthi's paternal aunt; Geetha's biological mother
- Unknown as Shruthi; Minister Surya Prakash and Bhanumathi's daughter; Vijay's half-sister; Geetha's cousin and half sister-in-law
- Unknown as Shekhar; Chandrika´s husband, Geetha´s biological father; Vijay and Shruthi's paternal uncle
- Unknown as Vaiju alias Vajjayanthi, Bhanumathi and Sithara's sister, Shruthi's aunt, Vijay's stepaunt
- Jayanth as Kiran - Minister Surya Prakash and Bhanumathi's son, Sudharani's stepson, Shruthi's brother, Vijay's half-brother, Geetha's cousin and half brother-in-law

=== Cameo Appearances ===
- Anupama Gowda as Bhumika
- Divya Wagulkar as Dasavala; Tribal girl

== Adaptations ==
Language	Title	Original release	Network(s)	Last aired	Notes
Kannada	Geetha ಗೀತಾ	6 January 2020	Colors Kannada	9 March 2024	Original
Bengali	Pherari Mon ফেরারি মন	7 November 2022	Colors Bangla	8 November 2024	Remake

== Production ==
The show owing to the COVID-19 pandemic in May 2021 started shooting in Ramoji Film City, Hyderabad for around a month.
