= Vijay Sales =

Indian electronics retail chain

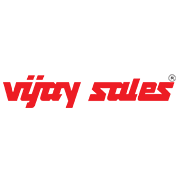
- Formerly: Vijay Sales (India) Pvt. Ltd.
- Type: Private Limited Company
- Industry: Retail
- Founded: 1967
- Headquarters: Mumbai, Maharashtra
- Area served: India
- Key people: Nanu Gupta (chairman and founder); Nilesh Gupta, Ashish Gupta and Karan Gupta (managing directors)
- Products: Consumer electronics
- Revenue: Approx 11,000 crores
- Number of employees: Approx 8,000, Dec
- Website: Official website

Vijay Sales (India) Pvt. Ltd., doing business as Vijay Sales, is an Indian retail chain of consumer electronics, headquartered in Jogeshwari, Mumbai. Vijay Sales started as a small TV showroom in Mumbai by Nanu Gupta in 1967. It currently operates 157 stores across the regions of Maharashtra, Haryana, UP, Gujarat, Delhi, Bengaluru, Andhra Pradesh, & Telangana.

== History ==
Nanu Gupta was born in Punjab Province, India in 1942. He moved to Bombay in 1954 and started working as a distributor for Usha electric fans.

Vijay Sales was founded in 1967 as a small television showroom by Nanu Gupta in Mahim, as Vijay Television Store. In 1981 the name was changed to the present name. Vijay Sales has since long evolved into one of India's leading chain of retailers. From 2010, Vijay Sales expanded from Maharashtra to Gujarat and the National Capital Region. In 2019, Vijay Sales acquired a chain of consumer durable retail stores in Telangana and Andhra Pradesh under the name of TMC (Tirumala Music Center) and has now re-branded TMC to Vijay Sales. Vijay Sales has more than 5,000 Products to choose from and is located in prime locations all across India and has 370 stores in Mumbai, 15 stores in Pune, 24 stores in Gujarat, 26 stores in Delhi, 9 stores in Haryana, 5 stores in Uttar Pradesh, 8 stores in Andhra Pradesh, and 33 stores in Telangana. The electronics retail chain also aims to take its total stores to 200 by 2025 from the 157 at present.

== Corporate structure ==
Vijay Sales' corporate headquarters is based in Mumbai. It is headed by Nanu Gupta who is the Founder and Chairman of Vijay Sales and is followed by his two sons Nilesh Gupta and Ashish Gupta and grandson Karan Gupta who are Managing Directors of the company. By January 2020, Vijay Sales had more than 8,000 employees and a well-connected supply chain and warehouses at its disposal.
