= Bigg Boss Kannada season 13 =

Indian TV show season

Bigg Boss Kannada
- Season 13
- Presented by: Kichcha Sudeepa
- No. of days: 77/112
- No. of housemates: 21
- Winner: TBDA
- Runner-up: TBDA
- No. of episodes: 64

Release
- Original network: Colors Kannada; JioHotstar
- Original release: 6 September 2026 – present

Series chronology
- ← Previous; Season 12

Bigg Boss Kannada 13 is the thirteenth season of the Indian Kannada-language reality television series Bigg Boss. Kichcha Sudeep is the host for the thirteenth consecutive year.

== Pre show ==
Ahead of the launch of the thirteenth season, the makers introduced a pre-selection format titled Bigg Boss: Agniparikshe. The format was officially unveiled through a promotional teaser released on 4 August 2026.

According to the announcement, Agniparikshe was designed as a talent-based selection process for commoner contestants before the main season began. Participants were expected to undergo multiple tasks, evaluations and screening rounds to secure a place inside the Bigg Boss Kannada house. The format was reported to be inspired by the Telugu spin-off Bigg Boss Agnipariksha, which previously served as a digital pre-show for selecting non-celebrity contestants in the Telugu version of the franchise. Colors Kannada announced the launch on 16 August 2026.

== Housemate status ==
Sl.No	Housemates	Day Entered	Day Exited	Housemates Status
1	Asiya	Day 0		
2	Dhanush	Day 0		
3	Gagan	Day 0		House Captain
4	Ganavi	Day 21		House Captain
5	Jagadeesh	Day 0		
6	Kiran	Day 0		
7	Prashant	Day 21		
8	Soundharya	Day 0		
9	Tandav	Day 0	Day 18	Evicted
9	Tandav	Day 25		
10	Yashas	Day 0		
11	Manjunath	Day 0	Day 35	Ejected
11	Manjunath	Day 63	Day 77	Guest
12	Sonika	Day 21	Day 70	Evicted
13	Kumari	Day 35	Day 56	Evicted
14	Lakshmi	Day 35	Day 49	Evicted
15	Kavya	Day 0	Day 42	Evicted
16	Sangeetha	Day 0	Day 31	Hospitalized
16	Sangeetha	Day 33	Day 35	Walked
17	Likith	Day 0	Day 28	Evicted
18	Vaishnavi	Day 0	Day 21	Evicted
19	Avinash	Day 0	Day 21	Evicted
20	Om Prakash	Day 0	Day 8	Walked
21	Prathama	Day 0	Day 7	Evicted

== Housemates ==
The participants in the order of appearance and entered to the house are:

=== Original entrants ===
==== Celebrities ====
- Jagadeesha MB aka Jaggu Mamma – Actor. He is known for his appearance in Love Mocktail 3.
- Soundarya Shetty – Model, Dancer, influencer and reality television personality known for being a finalist of Mtv Splitsvilla X6.
- Avinash Shatamarshan – Actor, writer and director. He is known for Kannadakkaagi Ondannu Otti and Dayavittu Gamanisi.
- Prathama Prasad – Actress. She is known for her work in Kannada cinema and television.
- Gagan Chinappa – Actor, known for his work in Kannada television dramas.
- Sangeetha Bhat Sudarshan – Actress. She is known for her appearances in television dramas Panjaradha Gili, Bhagyavantharu and Chandrachakori and movie debut in Preethi Geethi Ityaadi.
- Kavya Gowda – Actress. She is known for her appearance in television dramas Bhagyalakshmi.
- Om Prakash Rao – Film director and comedian . He is known for his work in the Kannada film industry. Also a housemate from Bigg Boss Kannada season 4.
- Asiya Firdose – Actress. She is known for her appearance in Shravani Subramanya.
- Tandav Ram – Bodybuilder and actor. He is known for his appearances in Jodi Hakki.
- Vaisnavi – Actress . She is known for her appearance in television dramas Mithuna Raashi and PremaKavya
- Yashas Krishna – Engineer and actor. He is known for his appearance in Pavitra Bandhana.

==== Commoners ====
All the commoners were selected through Bigg Boss: Agniparikshe, a pre-show.

- Kiran Shashtri – Spiritual guru, also known as Sher-e-Uttara Karnataka.
- Likith Gondi – Content creator and professional prankster.
- Dhanush Manjunath – Actor and Guinness World Record holder.
- Modern Mahakavi Manja (Ma.Ma.Ka) – Writer, Rapper and Influencer.

=== Wildcard entrants ===
- Ganavi Gowda – Reality television personality. She is known for being the runner-up of the reality show Halli Power .
- Prashanth Gowda – comedian and reality television personality. He is known for Gicchi GiliGili, Boys vs Girls and Quatle Kitchen.
- Sonika Gowda – Actress, entrepreneur and model. She is known for her work in Kannada films, including Shataya Gataya, Naane Raja and Khushi Khushiyagi.
- Kumari - Content creator and Bigg Boss Agniparikshe contestant .
- Lakshmi Gowda - Engineer, Content creator and Bigg Boss Agniparikshe contestant .

== Nominations table ==
#BB13	Week 1	Week 2	Week 3		Week 4	Week 5	Week 6	Week 7	Week 8	Week 9	Week 10	Week 11	Week 12	Week 13	Week 14	Week 15	Week 16	
#BB13	Week 1	Week 2	Week 3		Week 4	Week 5	Week 6	Week 7	Week 8	Week 9	Week 10	Week 11	Week 12	Week 13	Week 14	Week 15	Day TBA	Grand Finale Day 112
Nominees for House Captain	None		Asiya; Sangeetha		None	~~Ganavi~~; ~~Prashant~~	Asiya; Dhanush; Ganavi; Kavya; Kiran; Sonika; Tandav; Yashas	Gagan; Ganavi; Kiran; Yashas	Asiya; Soundharya	~~Kumari~~; Jagadeesh; Tandav	Ganavi; Yashas	Dhanush; Kiran; Jagadeesh; Manjunath	Asiya & Prashant; Ganavi & Gagan				None	
House Captain	None		Sangeetha		None	Tandav	Dhanush	Gagan	Soundharya	Jagadeesh	Yashas	~~Jagadeesh~~	Ganavi & Gagan				None	
Captain's Nominations	None		Vaishnavi		None	Dhanush; Yashas	None		Tandav (captain contendership)	Power to decide ranking of housemates	Soundharya (To Save)	None					None	
Vote to:	none	Evict	none		Evict													
Asiya	Nominated	Gagan; Avinash	Nominated		Likith; Manjunath	Ganavi; Tandav	Nominated	Nominated	Nominated	Gagan; Dhanush	Nominated	Safe						
Dhanush	Nominated	Avinash; Yashas	Nominated		Yashas; Sangeetha	Tandav; Gagan	House; Captain	Safe	Nominated	Soundharya; Gagan	Nominated	Nominated						
Gagan	Safe	Asiya; Soundharya	Nominated		Kiran; Dhanush	Manjunath; Dhanush	Safe	House; Captain	Nominated	Asiya; Dhanush	Safe	Nominated	House; Captain					
Ganavi	Not in house				Kiran; Yashas	Kavya; Jagadeesh	Nominated	Safe	Safe	Asiya; Kiran	Nominated	Safe	House; Captain					
Kiran	Nominated	Tandav; Kavya	Nominated		Not eligible	Sonika; Ganavi	Safe	Safe	Nominated	Prashant; Yashas	Nominated	Nominated						
Prashant	Not in house				Manjunath; Kiran	Manjunath; Yashas	Safe	Safe	Nominated	Kiran; Yashas	Nominated	Safe						
Soundharya	Nominated	Manjunath; Gagan	Nominated		Dhanush; Kiran	Sonika; Manjunath	Safe	Nominated	House; Captain	Kiran; Dhanush	Nominated	Nominated						
Tandav	Safe	Kiran; Manjunath	Nominated	Secret Room (Day 18 - Day 24)		House; Captain	Nominated	Nominated	Safe	Kiran; Asiya	Nominated	Nominated						
Yashas	Safe	Tandav; Avinash	Nominated		Likith; Dhanush	Tandav; Dhanush	Safe	Safe	Safe	Dhanush; Kiran	House; Captain	Nominated						
Jagadeesha	Safe	Kavya; Likith	Nominated		Kiran; Dhanush	Ganavi; Gagan	Nominated	Safe	Nominated	House; Captain	Nominated	Nominated						
Manjunath	Nominated	Soundharya; Kavya	Nominated		Kiran; Sangeetha	Prashant; Kiran	Ejected (Day 35)				Safe	Nominated	Left as Guest (Day 77)					
Sonika	Not in house				Likith; Yashas	Yashas; Soundarya	Nominated	Nominated	Safe	Asiya; Kiran	Nominated	Evicted (Day 70)						
Kumari	Not in house						Safe	Nominated	Nominated	Evicted (Day 56)								
Lakshmi	Not in house						Safe	Nominated	Evicted (Day 49)									
Kavya	Safe	Kiran; Avinash	Nominated		Dhanush; Manjunath	Ganavi; Manjunath	Nominated	Evicted (Day 42)										
Sangeetha	Safe	Avinash; Manjunath	House; Captain		Likith; Kiran	Manjunath; Tandav	Walked (Day 35)											
Likith	Safe	Avinash; Jagadeesha	Nominated		Jagadeesha; Kiran	Evicted (Day 28)												
Vaishnavi	Nominated	Avinash; Kiran	Nominated		Evicted (Day 21)													
Avinash	Nominated	Asiya; Dhanush	Nominated		Evicted (Day 21)													
Om Prakash	Nominated	Walked (Day 8)																
Prathama	Nominated	Evicted (Day 7)																
Notes	1	2	3	4	5	6	7	8	9	10	11	12						
Against Public Vote	Asiya; Avinash; Dhanush; Kiran; Manjunath; Om Prakash; Prathama; ~~Soundharya~~; Vaishnavi	Asiya; Avinash; Gagan; Kavya; Kiran; Manjunath; Soundharya; Tandhav; Vaishnavi	Jagadeesh; Likith; Soundharya; Tandav	Asiya; Avinash; Dhanush; Gagan; Jagadeesh; Kavya; ~~Kiran~~; Likith; Manjunath; Soundharya; Vaishnavi; Yashas	Dhanush; Kiran; Likith; Manjunath; Sangeetha; Yashas	Dhanush; Gagan; Ganavi; Manjunath; Sonika; Tandav; Yashas	Asiya; Ganavi; Jagadeesh; Kavya; Sonika; Tandav	Asiya; Kumari; Lakshmi; Sonika; Soundharya; Tandav	Asiya; Dhanush; Gagan; Jagadeesh; Kiran; Kumari; Prashant	Asiya; Dhanush; Gagan; Kiran; Sonika; Yashas	Asiya; Dhanush; Ganavi; Jagadeesh; Kiran; Prashant; Sonika; ~~Soundharya~~; Tandav	Dhanush; Jagadeesh; Kiran; Soundharya; Tandav; Yashas						
Best Performer	None				Gagan	Dhanush	Yashas	Soundharya	Prashant	Tandav	Kiran	None						
Worst Performer	None			Kiran	Manjunath; Ganavi	Manjunath	Kiran	None	Kiran	None		Asiya; Ganavi; Soundharya						
Kicchana Chappale	None	Audience	None	Asiya	None			Soundharya; Tandav	None			Gagan; Kiran						
Re-entered	None				Tandav	None				Manjunath	None							
Secret Room	None		Tandav	None														
Ejected / Removed	None					Manjunath	None											
Walked	None	Om; Prakash	None			Sangeetha	None											
Evicted	Prathama	No; Eviction	Tandav	Avinash	Likith	No; Eviction	Kavya	Lakshmi	Kumari	No; Eviction	Sonika	Manjunath (Guest)						
Evicted	Prathama	No; Eviction	Tandav	Vaishnavi	Likith	No; Eviction	Kavya	Lakshmi	Kumari	No; Eviction	Sonika	Manjunath (Guest)						

indicates the House Captain.
indicates that the candidate was selected by live audience vote to enter the house.
indicates that the candidate was rejected on-stage or evicted from the house.
indicates that the candidate was removed.
indicates that the candidate was in secret room.
indicates that the housemate was directly nominated for eviction prior to regular nominations.
indicates that the housemate was granted immunity.
indicates the Best Performer.
indicates the Worst performer.
indicates the Kicchana Chappele Given by Sudeepa
indicates the winner.
indicates the first runner-up.
indicates the second runner-up.
indicates the third runner-up.
indicates the fourth runner-up.

=== Nomination notes ===
- ^1: In week 1, housemates left in Aircraft were nominated and housemates moved to the main house were safe.
- ^2: On Day 8, Om Prakash left the house due to medical reasons.
- ^3: Mid-Week eviction.
- ^4: Double eviction.
- ^5: In week 4, Hijacker Sonika took away Kiran's eligibility to nominate.
- ^6: In week 5, Manjunath has been removed from the house due to the use of foul language and inappropriate behaviour and Sangeeta walked-Out of the house following health concern.
- ^7: In week 9, Manjunath and Yashas were engaged in a physical altercation leading to the removal of both contestants from the house.

== Release ==
Latest seasons of Kannada , Tamil, Telugu, Malayalam and Hindi editions of Bigg Boss were premiered on 6 September 2026. Ahead of the premiere, a promotional video featuring the hosts of all four South Indian editions— Kiccha Sudeepa, Vijay Sethupathi, Nagarjuna and Mohanlal was released.
