= Hanumantha Lamani =

Indian folk singer

- Born: 7 October 1993 (age 32); Haveri, Karnataka, India
- Education: Graduation
- Occupations: Singer; Folk Singer; Television personality
- Known for: Bigg Boss Kannada season 11; Sa Re Ga Ma Pa Kannada; Dance Karnataka Dance

Hanumantha Lamani (born 7 October 1993) is a shepherd boy and folk singer. He is the winner of the Bigg Boss Kannada season 11, a Kannada reality show hosted by actor Kiccha Sudeep.

== Early life and education ==
Hanumantha is from Haveri district, north Karnataka. He belongs to Lambani community. He did his schooling at Hukkerimath High School, Haveri and completed his graduation at Gudleppa Hallikeri College, Haveri.

== Reality shows ==
Hanumantha is not a trained singer but took part in the Sa Re Ga Ma Pa Kannada Season 15, a musical reality show, and finished as runner up. Later in 2024, he also took part in Dance Karnataka Dance Family War Season 2, hosted by Anushree.

On 26 January 2025, he won the Bigg Boss Kannada Season 11 trophy and a cash prize of Rs.5,000,000. He became the first contestant to enter as a wild card and win the trophy in the 11-year history of the Kannada reality show. He entered the Bigg Boss house on Day 21 and soon became a fan favourite. He received 52,389,318 votes from the viewers of the show and defeated Trivikram, who got over 20,000,000 votes.

Preceded by Karthik Mahesh (2023)	Bigg Boss Kannada Winner (Series 11) 2024	Succeeded by Gilli Nata (2025)
