= List of Kannada films of 2009 =

A list of films produced by the Sandalwood (Kannada language film industry) based in Bangalore in the year 2009.

A not so great year for Kannada cinema, with 15% success rate, notable films that were successful include Veera Madakari, Thaakath, Junglee, Ambari, Love Guru, Manasaare, and Eddelu Manjunatha.

Raaj The Showman became the highest-grossing movie of this year marking Puneeth on the top. Duniya Vijay with 2 hits, Sudeep and Jaggesh back with their box office glory, Diganth, Yogesh and Ajay Rao also had their share of success.

Aindrita Ray scored 2 big hits with Junglee and Manasaare, Yagna Shetty and Radhika Pandit grabbed all the awards for their performances in Eddelu Manjunatha and Love Guru. Shubha Poonja for Thaakath, Pooja Gandhi for Gokula and Ragini Dwivedi for Veera Madakari had a decent year too.

== Box office collection ==
The highest-grossing Kannada films released in 2009, by worldwide box office gross revenue, are as follows.

The rank of the films in the following depends on the worldwide gross.

*	Denotes films still running in cinemas worldwide

Highest worldwide gross of 2009
Rank	Title	Production company	Worldwide gross	Ref
1	Raaj – The Showman	Sri Seethabhaireshwara Productions	₹28 crore (US$2.9 million)	
2	Veera Madakari	S. S. Combines	₹18 crore (US$1.9 million)	
3	Junglee	Rockline Entertainments	₹12 crore (US$1.2 million)	
4	Manasaare	Rockline Entertainments	₹8 crore (US$830,000)	
5	Thaakath	—N/a	₹7 crore (US$730,000)	
6	Ambari	Sri Lambodara Combines	₹5 crore (US$520,000)	
7	Eddelu Manjunatha	Sanath Kumar Productions	₹4 crore (US$460,000)	
8	Love Guru	Naveen Films	₹3 crore (US$345,000)	
9	Kannadada Kiran Bedi	Ramu Enterprises	₹2 crore (US$230,000)	
10	Maleyalli Jotheyalli	Golden Movies	₹1 crore (us$115,000)	

== Released films ==
Films are listed based on release dates.

Month	Title	Director	Cast	Music	Genre	Ref.
January	Gulama	Tushar Ranganath	Prajwal Devaraj, Sonu, Bianca Desai	Gurukiran	Action; Romantic	
January	Anu	Shiva Ganapathy	Pooja Gandhi, Duniya Rashmi	Shekhar Chandra	Action; Thriller	
January	Chickpete Sachagalu	Nagendra Magadi	S. Narayan, Jaggesh, Ashwini, Manasi, Doddanna	S. Narayan	Comedy	
January	Kempa	Jagadeesh	Santhosh, Sai Dhanshika	Gurukiran	Action	
January	Taxi No-1	Prabhakar	Prabhakar, Nikitha Rao	Nataraj Kanagodu	Drama	
January	Circus	Dayal Padmanabhan	Ganesh, Archana Gupta	Emil Mohammed	Romantic; Action	
January	Shivamani	Amarnath SK	Sri Murali, Sharmiela Mandre	Veer Samarth	Action	
January	Jolly Days	M. D. Sridhar	Pradeep, Praveen, Vishwas, Spoorthi, Ruthuva, Raghavendra, Aishwarya Nag, Keerthi, Kishori Ballal, Niranjan, Rahul	Mickey J Meyer	Romantic	
January	Nanda	Anantha Raju	Shiva Rajkumar, Sandhya, Mythreya	V. Manohar	Action	
January	Ambari	A. P. Arjun	Yogish, Supreeta	V. Harikrishna	Romantic	
January	Meghave Meghave	V. Nagendra Prasad	Raam, Gracy Singh, Sudeep	V. Harikrishna		
February	Birugaali	Harsha	Chetan Kumar, Sitara Vaidya, Aakanksha Sontalia, Charisma Bharadwaj, Tara	Arjun Janya	Action	
February	Yodha	Om Prakash Rao	Darshan, Nikita Thukral	Hamsalekha	Action	
February	Idya Madyar Nagalikke	Yashwant Sardeshpande	Yashwant Sardeshpande, Malathi Sardeshpande, Sunetra Pandit, Poornachandra Tejaswi, Navyashree	Kiran Godkhindi	Comedy	
February	Junglee	Duniya Soori	Duniya Vijay, Aindrita Ray, Rangayana Raghu	V. Harikrishna	Action	
February	Kurunadu	G. Murthy	Dattanna, Lakshmi Hegde	Pravin Godkhindi	Drama	
February	KA-99 B-333	G. Arunkumar	Sunil, Deepa Chari	S. Nagu	Action	
February	Samskaravantha	K. Parthasarathi	Kashi, Ninasam Ashwat	Sadgunaraj	Drama	
February	Swathanthra Palya	Huccha Venkat	Arjun, Damini, Huccha Venkat, Deepa, C. R. Simha	M. N. Krupakar	Action	
February	Venkata in Sankata	Ramesh Arvind	Ramesh Arvind, Sharmiela Mandre, Umashree	Ricky Kej	Comedy	
February	Ee Sambhashane	M. Rajashekar	Sandesh, Hariprriya	V. Manohar	Romantic	
February	Thabbali	N. Loki	Aakash, Meghashri, Charulatha	A. M. Neel	Drama	
February	Namyajamanru	T. S. Nagabharana	Vishnuvardhan, Vijay Raghavendra, Navya Nair, Lakshmi Gopalaswamy	Hamsalekha	Family drama	
March	Rajakumari	S. Govindaraj	V. Ravichandran, Balaji, Ramanitu Chaudhary, Kanika, Nikita Thukral	V. Harikrishna	Romance	
March	Ninnalle Nanna Hrudaya	Chandrashekar Reddy	Manoj, Chintana Krishna	Aryan Kiran	Romance	
March	Shankara Punyakoti	G. Murthy	Sharath Babu, Vinaya Prasad	Pravin Godkhindi	Drama	
March	Anjadiru	R. Janardhan	Prashant, Shubha Poonja	Sundar C. Babu	Drama	
March	Baaji	S. Shidlaghatta Srinivas	Alok Kashinath, Rani	G. R. Shankar		
March	Veera Madakari	Sudeep	Sudeep, Ragini Dwivedi	M. M. Keeravani	Action	
March	Ram Balaram	U. B. Ramamurthy	Adi Lokesh	S. P. Raj	Drama	
March	Kannadadda Kiran Bedi	Om Prakash Rao	Malashri, Sayaji Shinde, Ashish Vidyarthi	Hamsalekha	Action	
April	Ghauttham	K. Rajeev Prasad	Prem Kumar, Sara Alambara, Kausalya, Sudharani, Kokila Mohan, Vinaya Prasad	Gurukiran	Romantic drama	
April	Jaaji Mallige	Anantha Raju	Ajay Rao, Gowri Munjal, Komal Kumar	Sadhu Kokila	Romance	
April	Hrudayagala Vishaya	Vasanth	Prashanth Kumar, Madhupriya	Drums Deva	Romance	
April	Jhossh	Shivamani	Rakesh Adiga, Alok, Sneha, Chetana, Poorna, Nithya Menen	Vardhan	Romance	
April	Nishedhagne	Padmanabha	Adi Lokesh, Priyanka	M. S. Giridhar	Action	
April	Savaari	Jacob Verghese	Srinagar Kitty, Raghu Mukherjee, Kamalinee Mukherjee, Suman Ranganathan	Manikanth Kadri; E. S. Murthy	Drama	
April	Uda	Shashank Raj	Yuvaraj, Sanchita Padukone	Bharanishree	Action	
April	Yagna	Krishna Brahma	Sri Murali, Priyanka	Murali Krishna	Action	
April	Auto	Mallikarjuna Muttalageri	Sathya, Roshani, Kruthika	Vijaykrishna Mysore	Action	
April	Chellidaru Sampigeya	S. Narayan	Prashanth, Bianca Desai, Anant Nag, Vishwas, Spoorthi	S. Narayan	Romance	
May	Eshtu Nagthi Nagu	Chindodi Madhukesha	Mohan, Roshani	M. S. Maruti	Comedy	
May	Machchaa	Dhananjaya Kundapura Datthu	Jeevan, Saritha Jain	Arjun Janya	Action	
May	Minchu	Vishal Raj	Siddhanth, Archana	Rajesh Ramanath	Drama	
May	Hatrick Hodi Maga	P. N. Sathya	Shiva Rajkumar, Nicolette Bird, Manju Bhargavi	Jassie Gift	Action	
May	Seena	Basavaraja Bellary	Tarun Chandra, Priyanka Chandra, Antara Reddy	A. T. Raveesh	Romance	
May	Dubai Babu	Naganna	Upendra, Nikita Thukral, Saloni Aswani, Kumar Govind	Sridhar V. Sambhram	Comedy	
May	Thaakath	M. S. Ramesh	Duniya Vijay, Shubha Poonja	Gurukiran	Action	
May	Jodi No. 1	Abhijeeth	Abhijeeth, Ram Kumar, Amrutha, Sangeetha Shetty	M. N. Krupakar	Drama	
May	Abhimani	Praveen	Rahul Salanke, Nidhi Subbaiah	Dharmateja	Romance	
May	Kalaakaar	Harish Raj	Harish Raj, Suman Ranganathan, Radhika Gandhi	Giridhar Diwan	Romance	
May	Nannedeya Haadu	Guruvendra	Anand, Ramya Barna	A. T. Raveesh	Romance	
June	Yuvah	Narendra Babu	Kartik Shetty, Madhu Sharma	Gurukiran	Action	
June	Kaaranji	M. D. Sridhar	Vijay Raghavendra, Gauri Karnik	Veer Samarth	Drama	
June	Olave Jeevana Lekkachaara	Nagathihalli Chandrashekhar	Radhika Pandit, Srinagar Kitty	Mano Murthy	Comedy drama	
June	Black	Mahendra	Kishore, Manasi	C. R. Bobby	Action	
June	Chaitanya	D. K. Shivraj	Master Sachin, Baby Nikshita	Gopikrishna	Drama	
June	Bande Barthale	Devadas	Surya, Supreetha	Devadas	Romance	
June	Preethse Preethse	K. Madesh	Yogesh, Udhayathara	Anoop Seelin	Romance	
July	Eddelu Manjunatha	Guruprasad	Jaggesh, Yagna Shetty	Anoop Seelin	Comedy	
July	Chamkaisi Chindi Udaysi	A. R. Babu	Komal Kumar, Nidhi Subbaiah, Umashree,	P. B. Balaji	Comedy	
July	Kabaddi	Narendra Babu	Praveen, Priyanka	Hamsalekha	Sports	
July	Kencha	P. N. Sathya	Prajwal Devaraj, Pragna Shetty	Anoop Seelin	Romance	
July	Love Guru	Shashank	Tarun Chandra, Radhika Pandit, Dileep Raj	Joshua Sridhar	Romance	
July	Mr. Painter	Dinesh Babu	Yogesh, Ramnitu Chaudhary, Rangayana Raghu	G. R. Shankar	Romance	
July	House Full	Hemanth Hegde	Diganth, Hemanth Hegde, Girija Oak, Vishaka Singh	Kiran	Comedy	
July	Muniya	T. Nagachandra	Mayur Patel, Sahitya	Abhimann Roy	Action	
July	Male Barali Manju Irali	Vijayalakshmi Singh	Srinagar Kitty, Parvathy, Hariprriya Umashree, Naga Kiran	Mano Murthy	Romance	
July	Venki	S. Madhav	Prashanth, Rashmi	A. M. Neel	Romance	
August	Cheluvina Chilipili	S. Narayan	Pankaj Narayan, Roopika, Ananth Nag, Sumalatha	Mickey J. Meyer	Romance	
August	Raaj the Showman	Prem	Puneeth Rajkumar, Priyanka Kothari	V. Harikrishna	Romance, Action	
August	Iniya	Mahesh	Balaji, Pooja Gandhi	Sridhar V. Sambhram	Romance	
September	Mussanjeya Gelathi	B P Srinivas	B P Srinivas, Shalini Srinivas	A M Neel	Romance	
September	Rajani	Thriller Manju	Upendra, Aarthi Chhabria, Mukul Dev, Rangayana Raghu	Hamsalekha	Action comedy	
September	Manasaare	Yogaraj Bhat	Diganth, Aindrita Ray	Mano Murthy	Romance	
September	Vayuputra	Kishore Sarja	Chiranjeevi Sarja, Aindrita Ray, Ambareesh	V. Harikrishna	Action	
September	Hushaar	Adarsh	Adarsh, Mallika Kapoor	Adarsh	Thriller	
September	Bhagyada Balegara	Om Sai Prakash	Shivarajkumar, Navya Nair	Ilaiyaraaja	Drama	
September	Prem Kahani	R. Chandru	Ajay Rao, Sheela	Ilaiyaraaja	Romance	
September	Bettapurada Ditta Makkalu	Kodlu Ramakrishna	Srinivasa Murthy, Master Shashank	C. R. Bobby	Drama	
September	Dhanush	Jayanth	Prashanth, Ramanithu Chaudhary	M. S. Maruthi	Romance	
October	Abhay	Mahesh Babu	Darshan, Aarthi Thakur, Pradeep Rawat	V. Harikrishna	Action	
October	Jaala	Naghanath M. Joshi	Chetan Gowda, Deepu, Padmini	Madhan Mohan	Romance	
October	Salute	B. C. Patil	B. C. Patil, Ashwini	Sai Karthik	Action	
October	Bellary Naga	Dinesh Babu	Vishnuvardhan, Manasi, Rajesh Nataranga, Avinash	L. N. Shastry	Drama	
October	Huchchi	Venkatesh Panchangam	Pooja Gandhi, Anant Nag, Soundaraya	Raj Bhaskar	Drama	
October	Gilli	Raghava Loki	Gururaj Jaggesh, Rakul Preet Singh	Yuvan Shankar Raja	Romance	
October	Ninagaagi Kaadiruve	Jolly Bastin	Vishal Hegde, Pooja Gandhi	Robin Gurang	Romance	
October	Mad Love	Teja G	Ramu, Raveena	L. N. Goochi	Romance	
October	Yaaradu	Srinivas Kaushik	Vinod Raj, Ashwini	Akhil G	Thriller	
October	Ajantha	Raajpa Ravishankar	Venkatesh, Honey Rose, Sai Kiran	Ilaiyaraaja	Drama	
October	Artha	B. Suresha	Raghunath, Kiran Barkoor	Hamsalekha	Drama	
October	Banada Neralu	Umashanker Swamy	B. Jayashree, Harish Raj	Pichchalli Srinivas	Drama	
October	Daatu	K. Shivarudraiah	Roopa Iyer, Dattanna	Hamsalekha	Drama	
October	Gubbachchigalu	Abhaya Simha	Abhilash, Prakruthi	Anmol Bhave	Drama	
October	Yogi	Udaya Prakash	Yogish, Biyanka Desai	Emil Mohammed	Action	
November	10th Class A Sec	Dil Satya	Naveen, Priyanka	R. N. Abhilash	Drama	
November	Ivnu Thumbaane Orata	Jyotish				
November	Mooru Guttu Ondu Sullu Ondu Nija	Dinesh Babu	Ramesh Arvind, Komal Kumar, Nancy, Sharan	Suma Shastry	Comedy	
November	Parichaya	K. Sanjay	Tarun Chandra, Rekha Vedavyas, Sindhu Lokanath	Jassie Gift	Romance	
November	Devaru Kotta Thangi	Om Sai Prakash	Shiva Rajkumar, Meera Jasmine, Monica	Hamsalekha	Family drama	
November	IPC Section 300	Shashikanth	Vijay Raghavendra, Priyanka Chandra	Veer Samarth	Crime	
November	Devru	Sadhu Kokila	Duniya Vijay, Pragna Shetty	Sadhu Kokila	Action	
November	Gokula	Prakash	Vijay Raghavendra, Yash, Pooja Gandhi, Nakshatra	Mano Murthy	Romance	
November	Jeeva	Prabhu Srinivas	Prajwal Devraj, Ruthuva	Gurukiran	Romance	
December	Male Bille	Mahesh Sukhadhare	Diganth, Akshay, Pragna Shetty	Manikanth Kadri	Romance	
December	Nirudyogi	Nag Hunasod	Chandrakanth, Pushpalatha	A. T. Raveesh	Drama	
December	Ravana	Yogish Hunsur	Yogesh, Sanchita Padukone	G. Abhiman Roy	Drama	
December	Maleyali Jotheyali	Preetham Gubbi	Ganesh, Anjana Sukhani, Sudharani	V. Harikrishna	Romance	
December	Kallara Santhe	D. Sumana Kittur	Yash, Hariprriya	V. Manohar	Political drama	
December	Raam	K. Madesh	Puneeth Rajkumar, Priyamani	V. Harikrishna	Romance	
December	Shishira	Manju Swaraj	Yashas Surya, Meghana, Prema	B. Ajaneesh Loknath	Drama	
December	Putaani Party	P. N. Ramchandra	Ranjita Jadhav, Sharad Anchatgiri	Vijay Prakash	Drama	

== See also ==
- List of Kannada films of 2010
- List of Kannada films of 2008
- Cinema of Karnataka
