= List of Kannada films of 2007 =

A list of films produced by the Sandalwood (Kannada language film industry) based in Bangalore in the year 2007.

A relatively low phase for Kannada films in terms of numbers, Duniya became the top critically and commercially successful movie this year. Other notable ones include Cheluvina Chittara, Krishna, No 73, Shanti Nivasa, Chanda, Milana, Ee Bandhana and Arasu.

Duniya Vijay cemented his position in the industry with director Duniya Soori bringing a fresh wave of films. Puneeth Rajkumar, Pooja Gandhi and Ganesh with 2 big hits along with Sudeep continued their string of success. This year also introduced noteworthy actresses like Amulya and Sharmeila Mandre.

== Released films ==
Month	Title	Director	Cast	Music	Other notes
January	Sixer	Shashank	Prajwal Devaraj, Devaki	Hamsalekha	
January	Hosavarsha	Vijay Roshan	Naveen Mayur, Arathi Puri, Shobhraj, Shikka, Devan	Sangeetha Raja	
January	Ee Rajeev Gandhi Alla	Ravi Srivatsa	Vijay Raghavendra, Rakshitha, Duniya Vijay	Sadhu Kokila	
January	Thayiya Madilu	S. Narayan	Shiva Rajkumar, Rakshita, Jayasudha, Vinaya Prasad	S. A. Rajkumar	
January	Naayi Neralu	Girish Kasaravalli	Pavithra Lokesh, Ananya Kasaravalli	Isaac Thomas Kottukapally	
January	Sneha Parva	G. K. Mudduraj	Paartha, Sowmya, Chetan, Doddanna, Master Anand	Lio	
January	Arasu	Mahesh Babu	Puneet Rajkumar, Ramya, Meera Jasmine	Joshua Sridhar	
January	Poojari	Sharan Kumar Kabbur	Adi Lokesh, Neethu	Abhiman Roy	
February	Vidyarthi	T Nagachandra	Tharun Sudhir, Nikita Thukral, Sharan, Tara	R P Patnaik	
February	Thangiya Mane	M. S. Srinivasa	Vijay, Swathi, Bhavya, Dharma	K. Raju Upendrakumar	
February	Police Story 2	Thriller Manju	Saikumar, Rockline Venkatesh, Shobhraj	R. P. Patnaik	
February	Bhoopathi	S. Govindu	Darshan, Sherin	V. Harikrishna	
February	SMS 6260	Sundeep Malani	Diganth, Jaanu	Michael Dayao, Lokesh – Prakash, Dr. Ravi E. Dattatreya	
February	Duniya	Soori	Duniya Vijay, Duniya Rashmi, Yogesh, Rangayana Raghu	V. Manohar	
February	Sajni	Murugesh	Dhyan, Sharmila Mandre, Ananth Nag, Bhavya	A. R. Rahman	
March	Parodi	Sai Prakash	Upendra, Neha Pendse, Umashree	Rajesh Ramanath	
March	VIP 5	B. S. Rajashekar; B. S. Yashwanth	Vinod Prabhakar, Mohan Shankar, Damini, Adi Lokesh	Rajesh Ramnath	
March	Sri Dhanamma Devi	Chindodi Bangaresh	Shivadwaj, Anu Prabhakar, Jayanthi, KSL Swamy	Hamsalekha	
March	Ekadantha	Sachin	Vishnuvardhan, Ramesh Aravind, Gurukiran, Prema, Umashree	Gurukiran	
March	Ondhu Preethiya Kathe	Rajashekar Rao K.	Yagna Shetty, Shankar Aryan, Narayana Swamy	Gandharva	
March	Rakshaka	Mandya Nagaraj	Saikumar, Bhanuprakash, Rani	K. V. Ravichandra	
March	Preethigaagi	S. Mahendar	Srimurali, Sridevi Vijaykumar, Srujan Lokesh	S. A. Rajkumar	
April	Shri Kshetra Kaivara Thathaiah	Pallaki	Saikumar, Tara, Rangayana Raghu, R. N. Sudarshan	Hamsalekha	
April	Thimma	Sai Sagar	Arjun, B. Saroja Devi, Prashanti Naik	Venkat - Narayan	
April	E Preethi Onthara	Tenemane Subramanyam	Sachin Suverna, Maanya, Mithun Tejasvi	Shameer	
April	Lancha Samrajya	Boodal Krishnamurthy	Master Hirannaiah, C. R. Simha, Umashree, Ramesh Bhat	Raju Upendra Kumar	
April	Bhanamathi	Jayasimha Musuri	Devaraj, Shwetha, Sadhana Singh, Gurudatth Musuri	M. S. Maruthi	
April	Soundarya	E. Chennagangappa	Ramesh Aravind, Rahul Dev, Sakshi Shivanand, Baby Shreya	Hamsalekha	
April	Bhaktha	Sri Ram	Agnni, Sindhu	Abhiman Roy	
April	Dadagiri	Joe Simon	Sri Krishna, Seema, Avinash, Shobhraj, B. C. Patil	Abhiman Roy	
April	Janapada	Baraguru Ramachandrappa	Raghava, Radhika Kumaraswamy, Nandini	Hamsalekha	
April	Bhoogatha	B. R. Keshav	Vivek Bidu, Nagendra Urs, Daksha, Kangana, Harish Rai	M S Maruthi	
May	Masti	Shivamani	Upendra, Jennifer Kotwal, Shashikumar, Umashree	Gurukiran	
May	Pallakki	Narendra Babu K.	Prem Kumar, Gurukiran, Ramanitu Chaudhary	Gurukiran	
May	Masanada Makkalu	C. Lakshmana	Dattanna, Ohilesh	R Damodhar	
May	Govinda Gopaala	C. H. Balaji Singh	Jaggesh, Komal Kumar, Neethu	Rajbharath	
May	Dushman	B. S. Bagalkote	Yashwanth, Anitha Nair, Shobhraj	S. P. Chandrakanth	
May	Amrutha Vaani	B. R. Rajashekar	Ajay Rao, Naveen Krishna, Radhika Kumaraswamy	M. P. Naidu	
May	Santha	S. Murali Mohan	Shiva Rajkumar, Aarti Chhabria	Gurukiran	
June	Kshana Kshana	Sunil Kumar Desai	Vishnuvardhan, Auditya, Prema, Kiran Rathod	R. P. Patnaik	
June	Hudugaata	Sanjay K.	Ganesh, Rekha Vedavyas	Jassie Gift	
June	No 73, Shanthi Nivasa	Sudeepa	Sudeepa, Deepa, Anu Prabhakar	Bharadwaj	
June	Jambada Hudugi	Priya Hassan	Jai Akash, Priya Hassan	Rajesh Ramanath	
June	Cheluvina Chittara	S. Narayan	Ganesh, Amoolya, Komal Kumar	Mano Murthy	
June	Sathyavan Savithri	Ramesh Aravind	Ramesh Aravind, Jennifer Kotwal, Daisy Bopanna, Aniruddha Jatkar	Guru Kiran	
June	Kaada Beladingalu	B. S. Lingadevaru	C. H. Lokanath, H. G. Dattatreya, Ananya Kasaravalli	Rajesh Ramanath	
June	Bombugalu Saar Bombugalu	B. Shankar	Adarsh, Sunayana, B. C. Patil, Shobhraj	M. S. Maruthi	
July	Ugadi	Om Sai Prakash	V. Ravichandran, Jennifer Kotwal, Kamna Jethmalani, Srikanth	R. P. Patnaik	
July	Thamashegagi	Kodlu Ramakrishna	Aniruddh, Rekha Vedavyas, Komal Kumar	R. P. Patnaik	
July	Snehana Preethina	Sahuji Shinde	Darshan, Auditya, Lakshmi Rai, Sindhu Tolani	V. Harikrishna	
July	Meera Madhava Raghava	T. N. Seetharam	Diganth, Ramya, Thilak Shekar, Harini	Hamsalekha	
August	Manmatha	N. Rajesh Fernandis	Jaggesh, Komal Kumar, Gurleen Chopra	Vijaya Bharathi	
August	Savi Savi Nenapu	Santosh Rai Pathaje	Prem Kumar, Mallika Kapoor, Tejaswini Prakash	R. P. Patnaik	
August	Maathaad Maathaadu Mallige	Nagathihalli Chandrashekar	Vishnuvardhan, Suhasini, Sudeepa, Tara	Mano Murthy	
August	Gandana Mane	S. Mahendar	Shiva Rajkumar, Gowri Munjal	V. Manohar	
August	Ninade Nenapu	Madan Patel	Mayur Patel, Maya	Mahesh Patel	
August	Nali Naliyutha	Jayanth	Aniruddha Jatkar, Vidisha, Ananth Nag	Rajesh Ramanath	
August	Jeevana Dhaare	Muraju Boodhigere	Siddarth	Raju Upendra Kumar	
September	Milana	Prakash	Puneeth Rajkumar, Parvathi, Dileep Raj, Pooja Gandhi	Mano Murthy	
September	Prarambha	Santosh Sivan	Prabhu Deva, Skandha, B. Saroja Devi		Short film
September	Anatharu	Sadhu Kokila	Upendra, Darshan, Radhika, Sanghavi	Sadhu Kokila	
September	Road Romeo	Om Sai Prakash	Dilip Pai, Ashita, Avinash	K. M. Indra	
September	Guna	Nag	Venkatesh, Avinash, Kishore, Seema	Vijay Anand	
September	Agrahaara	Akshaya	Arya, Neetashri, Kishore	Rajesh Ramanath	
October	Krishna	M. D. Sridhar	Ganesh, Pooja Gandhi, Sharmila Mandre	V. Harikrishna	
October	Dheemantha Manushya	Tarani	Gopal Shetty Koragal	A Karthikraj	
October	Circle Rowdy	B. Ramamurthy	Vinod Prabhakar, Varini, Umashree	M. N. Krupakar	
October	Shukra	G. K. Mudduraj	Vinod Raj, Priyadarshini, Leelavathi	Gautham	
October	Geleya	Harsha	Prajwal Devaraj, Tarun Chandra, Kirat Bhattal	Mano Murthy	
October	Aa Dinagalu	K. M. Chaitanya	Chethan Kumar, Archana, Sharath Lohitashwa	Ilaiyaraaja	
November	Yuga	Chandra	Duniya Vijay, Kavya	Arjun Janya	
November	Snehanjali	Girish Kamplapur, R. G. Siddaramu	Dhruva	Rajesh Ramanath	
November	Ganesha	Dinesh Baboo	Jaggesh, Ajay Rao, Ranjani, Ananth Nag, Vanitha Vasu, Vanishree	Manikanth Kadri	
November	Chanda	S. Narayan	Duniya Vijay, Shubha Poonja, Komal Kumar	S. Narayan	
November	Orata I Love You	Shree	Prashanth, Sowmya	G. R. Shankar	
November	Hetthare Hennane Herabeku	Om Sai Prakash	S. P. Balasubrahmanyam, Lakshmi, Umashree, Rekha Vedavyas	Mano Murthy	
November	Gunavantha	Raghuvardhan	Prem Kumar, Rekha Vedavyas, Rangayana Raghu	Hamsalekha	
November	Right Adare	Sharavana	Mohan, Sunil, Satya, Bhavya, Sangeetha Shetty, Preethi, Priyanka	A. M. Neel	
December	Operation Ankusha	H. Vasudev Rao	Adhithya, Ashwin R, Roopashree, Meghashree	V. Manohar	
December	Lava Kusha	Sai Prakash	Shiva Rajkumar, Upendra, Jennifer Kotwal, Charmy Kaur	Gurukiran	
December	Appacchi	Kashinath	Kashinath, Arpitha, Mukhyamantri Chandru	Anamika	
December	Naanu Neenu Jodi	N. R. Nanjunde Gowda	Vijay Raghavendra, Madhumitha	Hamsalekha	
December	Ee Bandhana	Vijayalakshmi Singh	Vishnuvardhan, Darshan, Jayapradha, Jennifer Kotwal, Ananth Nag, Tara	Mano Murthy	
December	Ee Preethi Yeke Bhoomi Melide	Prem	Prem, Namratha, Rohini	R. P. Patnaik	

== See also ==
- Kannada films of 2008
- Cinema of Karnataka
