= Filmfare Award for Best Supporting Actress – Kannada =

Indian annual film award

- Awarded for: Best Performance by an Actress in a Supporting Role
- Country: India
- Presented by: Filmfare
- First award: Leelavathi for Kannadada Kanda (2007)
- Currently held by: Priya Shathamarshan for Bheema (2024)
- Website: http://filmfareawards.indiatimes.com/

The Filmfare Award for Best Supporting Actress – Kannada is an award presented annually by the Filmfare magazine as part of its annual Filmfare Awards South for Kannada films. It is given in honor of an actress who has delivered an outstanding performance in a supporting role while working within the Kannada film industry. Although the awards for Kannada films started in 1970, awards for the best supporting actress category started only in 2007. At the 54th Filmfare Awards South ceremony held in 2007, Leelavathi was the first winner of this award for her role in Kannadada Kanda.

Since its inception, the award has been given to ten different actresses. With three nominations including one win, Tara has been the most nominated.

== Superlatives ==
Superlative	Actor	Record
Actress with most awards	Umashree	2 wins
Actress with most nominations	Umashree; Tara	3 nominations
Oldest winner	Leelavathi	69 years
Oldest nominee	Leelavathi	69 years
Youngest nominee	Harshika Poonacha	17 years

== Winners and nominees ==
In the following table, the years are listed as per Filmfare convention, and generally correspond to the year of film's theatrical release; the ceremonies are always held the following year.

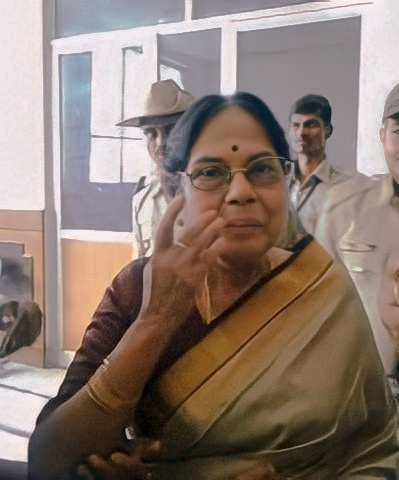
Leelavathi – The first recipient

Table key
‡	Indicates the winner

Year	Actor	Film	Role(s)	Ref.
2006 (54th)	Leelavathi ‡	Kannadada Kanda		
2007 (55th)	Tara ‡	Ee Bandhana	Sukanya	
2008 (56th)	Shubha Poonja ‡	Moggina Manasu	Renuka Devi	
2008 (56th)	Anu Prabhakar	Mussanjemaatu	Shwetha	
2008 (56th)	Bhavana Rao	Gaalipata	Pavani	
2008 (56th)	Neethu	Gaalipata	Radha	
2008 (56th)	Padmaja Rao	Taj Mahal	Shruti's mother	
2009 (57th)	Tulasi ‡	Jhossh	Sharadamma	
2009 (57th)	Anjana Sukhani	Maleyali Jotheyali	Sandhya	
2009 (57th)	Nithya Menen	Jhossh	Meera	
2009 (57th)	Suman Ranganathan	Savari		
2009 (57th)	Yagna Shetty	Love Guru		
2010 (58th)	Umashree ‡	Krishnan Love Story		
2010 (58th)	Harshika Poonacha	Jackie	Yashoda	
2010 (58th)	Lakshmi Gopalaswamy	Aptharakshaka	Saraswathi	
2010 (58th)	Ramya Barna	Pancharangi	Latha	
2010 (58th)	Tara	Modalasala	Deepu's mother	
2011 (59th)	Shruti ‡	Puttakkana Highway	Puttakka	
2011 (59th)	Abhinaya	Hudugaru	Pavithra	
2011 (59th)	Aindrita Ray	Paramathma	Saanvi	
2011 (59th)	Ramya Barna	Hudugaru	Sushma	
2011 (59th)	Veena Sundar	Olave Mandara	Nanji	
2012 (60th)	Suman Ranganathan ‡	Sidlingu	Aandalamma	
2012 (60th)	Catherine Tresa	Godfather	Vani	
2012 (60th)	Jaya Prada	Sangolli Rayanna	Kittur Chennamma	
2012 (60th)	Sindhu Lokanath	Drama	Chandrika	
2012 (60th)	Umashree	Alemari	Saroja	
2013 (61st)	Kalyani Raju ‡	Jayammana Maga	Jayamma	
2013 (61st)	Milana Nagaraj	Brindavana	Madhu	
2013 (61st)	Parul Yadav	Bachchan	Anjali	
2013 (61st)	Rukmini Vijayakumar	Bhajarangi	Krishne	
2013 (61st)	Tara	Shravani Subramanya	Anuradha	
2014 (62nd)	Samyukta Hornad ‡	Oggarane	Meghana	
2014 (62nd)	Asha Sarath	Drishya	IGP Roopa Chandrashekhar	
2014 (62nd)	Malavika Avinash	Mr. and Mrs. Ramachari	Sudha	
2014 (62nd)	Padmaja Rao	Ugramm	Agastya's mother	
2014 (62nd)	Sumithra	Shivajinagara		
2015 (63rd)	Sudharani ‡	Vaastu Prakaara	Vandana	
2015 (63rd)	Avantika Shetty	RangiTaranga	Sandhya Bhargav	
2015 (63rd)	Chandrika	Kendasampige	Shakuntala Shetty	
2015 (63rd)	Madhoo	Ranna	Saraswathi	
2015 (63rd)	Paavana Gowda	Aatagara	Anu	
2016 (64th)	Samyuktha Hegde ‡	Kirik Party	Aarya	
2016 (64th)	Aindrita Ray	Niruttara	Shravya	
2016 (64th)	Meghashree Bhagavatar	Last Bus	Seethakka	
2016 (64th)	Sonu	Kiragoorina Gayyaligalu	Nagamma	
2016 (64th)	Suman Ranganathan	Neer Dose	Sharada Mani	
2017 (65th)	Bhavani Prakash ‡	Urvi	Bobby	
2017 (65th)	Aruna Balraj	Operation Alamelamma	Alamelamma	
2017 (65th)	Samyukta Hornad	Dayavittu Gamanisi		
2017 (65th)	Usha Bhandary	Ondu Motteya Kathe		
2017 (65th)	Veena Sundar	Kaafi Thota	Meera	
2018 (66th)	Sharanya ‡	Nathicharami	Suma	
2018 (66th)	Shreya Anchan	Katheyondu Shuruvagide	Swarna	
2018 (66th)	Sudharani	Life Jothe Ondh Selfie	Thulasi	
2018 (66th)	Sumalatha	Thayige Thakka Maga	Parvathi	
2018 (66th)	Suman Nagarkar	Jeerjimbe		
2019	AWARDS FUNCTION WAS SUSPENDED DUE TO COVID-19 PANDEMIC			
2020–21 (67th)	Umashree ‡	Rathnan Prapancha	Saroja Bai	
2020–21 (67th)	Aarohi Narayan	Shivaji Surathkal	Dr. Anjali	
2020–21 (67th)	Amrutha Iyengar	Love Mocktail	Joshitha	
2020–21 (67th)	Meghashree	Mugilpete		
2020–21 (67th)	Sparsha Rekha	Popcorn Monkey Tiger	Padma	
2020–21 (67th)	Usha Ravishankar	Salaga	Vijay's mother	
2022 (68th)	Mangala N ‡	Taledanda	Kethamma	
2022 (68th)	Aditi Sagar	Vedha	Kanaka	
2022 (68th)	Archana Jois	KGF: Chapter 2	Shanthamma	
2022 (68th)	Manasi Sudhir	Kantara	Kamala	
2022 (68th)	Umashree	Vedha	Shankri	
2023 (69th)	Sudha Belawadi ‡	Kousalya Supraja Rama	Kousalya	
2023 (69th)	Gunjalamma	Pinky Elli		
2023 (69th)	M. D. Pallavi	19.20.21		
2023 (69th)	Shruti	Kaatera	Kumari	
2023 (69th)	Tara	Tagaru Palya	Shantha	
2024 (70th)	Priya Shathamarshan ‡	Bheema	Girija	
2024 (70th)	Apeksha Choranahalli	Koli Esru	Lachchu	
2024 (70th)	Harini Shreekanth	Kerebete	Gowrakka	
2024 (70th)	Lekha Naidu	Roopanthara	Hanumakka	
2024 (70th)	Rekha Kudligi	Hadinelentu	Seetha	
2024 (70th)	Sandhya Arekere	Photo	Gangamma	
