= List of Kannada films of the 2000s =

The following are lists of Kannada feature films released in the 2000s.

- List of Kannada films of 2000
- List of Kannada films of 2001
- List of Kannada films of 2002
- List of Kannada films of 2003
- List of Kannada films of 2004
- List of Kannada films of 2005
- List of Kannada films of 2006
- List of Kannada films of 2007
- List of Kannada films of 2008
- List of Kannada films of 2009
