= List of Kannada films of 2008 =

This is a list of films produced by the Sandalwood (Kannada language film industry) based in Bangalore in 2008.

This year sought good numbers for many movies, some of the top movies includes Gaalipata, Gaja, Gulabi Talkies, Moggina Manasu, Mussanje Maatu, Navagraha, Taj Mahal and Accident, however Buddhivanta became the highest grossing film of the year.

Umashree clinched the National Award for Best Actress this year. Pooja Gandhi became the golden girl with back to back superhits while Ganesh continued his success with Gaalipata. Sudeep, Darshan, Upendra, Ramya reprised their success streak as usual.

This year also witnessed a breakthrough for actors, Diganth, Shubha Poonja and Neethu and new talents like Radhika Pandit and Yash who went on becoming the biggest stars of the industry.

== Highest grossing films ==
Rank	Title	Collection	Ref.
1.	Buddhivantha	₹21 crore (₹65.29 crore in 2025)	
2.	Navagraha	₹20 crore (₹62.18 crore in 2025)	
3.	Gaalipata	₹18 crore (₹55.96 crore in 2025)	
4.	Mussanje Maatu	₹17 crore (₹52.85 crore in 2025)	
5.	Accident	₹15 crore (₹46.63 crore in 2025)	
6.	Gaja	₹13 crore (₹40.41 crore in 2025)	
7.	Moggina Manasu	₹11 crore (₹34.19 crore in 2025)	
8.	Taj Mahal	₹10 crore (₹31.09 crore in 2025)	
9.	Gulabi Talkies	₹9 crore (₹27.98 crore in 2025)	
10.	Bindaas	₹8 crore (₹24.87 crore in 2025)	

== List of Kannada films released ==
Month	Title	Director	Cast	Music	Notes
January	Gaja	K. Madhesh	Darshan, Navya Nair, Devaraj	V. Harikrishna	
January	Gaalipata	Yogaraj Bhat	Ganesh, Daisy Bopanna, Rajesh Krishnan, Bhavana Rao, Diganth, Neethu, Ananth Nag	V. Harikrishna	
January	Honganasu	Ratnaja	Prem Kumar, Anuradha Mehta, Anjali, Ananth Nag	Hamsalekha	
January	Singapuradali Shambulinga	B. R. Keshav	Chidananda, Jahangir	M. S. Maruthi	
February	Beladingalagi Baa	M. S. Ramesh	Chandrashekhara Kambara, Vijay Raghavendra, Ramnitu Chaudari, Rangayana Raghu	Gurukiran	
February	Navashakti Vaibava	Om Sai Prakash	Shruthi, Radhika Kumaraswamy, Ramkumar	Hamsalekha	
February	Hani Hani	Sharan	Tarun Chandra, Pooja Gandhi, Bhavya, Rangayana Raghu	S. Chinna	
February	Avva	Kavita Lankesh	Shruthi, Duniya Vijay, Smitha	Isaac Thomas Kottukapally	
February	Bindaas	D. Rajendra Babu	Puneeth Rajkumar, Hansika Motwani, Nassar	Gurukiran	
February	Yuga Yugagale Saagali	Shashank Raj	Yashas Surya, Megha Ghosh, Alisha, Ananth Nag	Hamsalekha	
February	Hogi Baa Magale	U. H. Rajanna	Athin, Deepa Chari	L. N. Shastri	
February	Inthi Ninna Preethiya	Duniya Soori	Srinagar Kitty, Sonu, Bhavana	Sadhu Kokila	
February	Shivani	Vishal Raj	Suraj, Shivani	Jamesh Sakaleshpur	
March	Marujanma	A. R. Babu	Naga Kiran, Priyanka, Dimple Chopade	Sri Murali	
March	Manasugula Mathu Madhura	Manju Maskal Matti	Anand, Hariprriya	K. Kalyan	
March	Varasdhaara	Guru Deshpande	Sandeep, Ashwini, Sanjjana, Ravi Belagere	Rajesh Ramanath	
March	Nanda Loves Nanditha	B. N. Vijayakumar	Yogesh, Shwetha	Emil Mohammed	
March	Gooli	P. N. Sathya	Sudeep, Mamta Mohandas	Anoop Seelin	
March	Ondu Koleya Sutha	Om Prakash Nayak	Om Prakash Nayak, Lalitha Nayak, Lakshmishree, Rekha Das, Mandeep Roy	Om Prakash Nayak	
March	Satya In Love	Raghava Loki	Shiva Rajkumar, Genelia, Ramanitu Choudhari, Komal Kumar	Gurukiran	
April	Accident	Ramesh Aravind	Ramesh Aravind, Pooja Gandhi, Mohan Shankar, Rekha Vedavyas, Thilak Shekar, Pathi Iyer	Ricky Kej	
April	Happy New Year 00:45PM	Gunakumar Patnayak	Vikram, Harshitha, Chandru, Kamal	A. T. Raveesh	
April	Chili Pili Hakkigalu	Kodlu Ramakrishna	Girish Karnad, Diganth	V. Manohar	
April	Mr. Garagasa	Dinesh Baboo	Komal Kumar, Ananth Nag, Aishwarya, Sudharani	Manikanth Kadri	
April	Malenada Mallige	Hanchhilli Shivkumar	Nitin, Daksha	Maruthi	
April	Moggina Jade	P. R. Ramadas Naidu	Baby Shreesha, Master Anirudh, Pavitra Lokesh, Rajesh Nataranga	L. Vaidyanathan	Released in film festivals
April	Satya Harischandra (color)	Hunsur Krishnamurthy	Dr. Rajkumar, Udaykumar, Pandari Bai	Pendyala	Re-released
April	Aramane	Nagashekar	Ganesh, Roma, Ananth Nag	Gurukiran	
May	Gange Baare Thunge Baare	Sadhu Kokila	Prajwal Devaraj, Gayathri, Sunaina, Sadhu Kokila	Sadhu Kokila	
May	Jnanajyothi Sri Siddaganga	Omkar	Sridhar, Srinivasa Murthy, Tara	K. Yuvaraj	
May	Thaayi	Baraguru Ramachandrappa	Pramila Joshai, Kumar Govind, Sunder Raj	Hamsalekha	
May	Baba	Trishul	Karthick, Pragnya	Arjun Janya	
May	Super Jodi	B. Sathyanarayana	Ananth Nag, Chidananda, Jahangir, Dharma	M. S. Maruthi	
May	Mussanje Maathu	Mahesh	Sudeepa, Ramya, Anu Prabhakar	Sridhar V. Sambhram	
May	Chellatada Hudugaru	Jyotish, Ram Chandra	Sandeep, Jyothi	AT Raveesh	
May	Prachanda Ravana	Srinivas Prasad	Devaraj, Bharat Bhagavathar, Sudharani	Gopi Krishna	
May	Sundari Ganda Sadananda	V. Umakanth	Sharan, Apoorva, Sanjana Rao, Sanket Kashi	Abbas Rafeeq	
May	Athmeeya	Govindaraj	Akul Balaji, Smitha, Rangayana Raghu, C. R. Simha	Manoj George	
May	Indra	H. Vasu	Darshan, Namitha, Sanghavi	V. Harikrishna	
June	Bandhu Balaga	Naganna	Shiva Rajkumar, Shashikumar, Tejaswini Prakash, Poonam Kaur	Hamsalekha	
June	Neene Neene	Shivadwaj	Dhyan, Aishwarya Nag	Srimurali	
June	Darode	Uday Jadugar	Vinod Kamat, Aishwarya Nag	Hamsalekha	
June	Channa	S. Umesh	Deepak, Raj Bahaddur, Ponnambalam	Venkat-Narayan	
June	Akasha Gange	Dinesh Baboo	Mithun Tejaswi, Chaya Singh, Jayanthi, Smitha	Deva	
June	Huttidare Kannada Nadali Huttabeku	Mahadev	Ajay Rao, Master Anand, Ramakrishna, Deepa, Vinaya Prasad	K. M. Indra	
June	Kaamannana Makkalu	Chi Guru Dutt	Sudeep, Deepu, Vaibhavi, Doddanna, Rockline Venkatesh	Vidyasagar	
June	Vasanthakala	V. Srinivas	Hariprriya, Naga Kiran, Sharan	V. Manohar	
June	Nee Tata Naa Birla	Nagendra Magadi	V. Ravichandran, Jaggesh, Jennifer Kotwal, Pooja Gandhi, Keerthi Chawla, Urvashi, Nikita Thukral	Gurukiran	
June	Meravanige	Mahesh Babu	Prajwal Devraj, Aindrita Ray	V. Manohar	
July	Minchina Ota	A. M. R. Ramesh	Vijay Raghavendra, Sri Murali, Lakshmi Rai, Umashree	V. Manohar / Dharma Vish (background score)	
July	Citizen	Om Sai Prakash	Saikumar, Ashish Vidyarthi, Vaibhavi	Vandemataram Srinivas	
July	Apaharana	B. R. Keshava	Meghana, Dharma, Thriller Manju	Maruti	
July	Moggina Manasu	Shashank Raj	Shubha Poonja, Radhika Pandit, Yash, Sangeetha Shetty, Manasi	Mano Murthy	
July	Zindagi	Mugil	Rajeev, Kishore, Priyanka	Mysore Mohan	
July	Taj Mahal	R. Chandru	Ajay Rao, Pooja Gandhi, Ananth Nag	Abhimann Roy	
July	Hrudaya I Miss U	Sathya	Maithreyi, Shivani, Shreyas	Ram Shankar	
August	Nandadeepa	Shivu Hiremata	Shruthi, Devaraj	Gururaja Hoskote	
August	Namma Preethi Shashwatha	Kitti	Sathya, Jyothika, Shobhraj	Mahesh Patel	
August	Belura Baale	Halkere Naganna	Rajeshkumar, Kalpanasri		
August	Bombaat	D. Rajendra Babu	Ganesh, Ramya	Mano Murthy	
August	Arjun	Shahuraj Shinde	Darshan, Meera Chopra	V. Harikrishna	
August	Anthu Inthu Preethi Banthu	Veera Shankar	Aditya Babu, Ramya	Yuvan Shankar Raja; Gurukiran	
August	Kalleshi Malleshi	Mastan	Chidananda (3 roles), Meghana, Dharma		
August	Kodagana Koli Nungitha	Vasu	Jaggesh, Pooja Gandhi	Sadhu Kokila	
August	Madesha	Ravi Srivatsa	Shiva Rajkumar, Sonam Bhatia, Ravi Belagere	Mano Murthy	
September	Chaitrada Chandrama	S. Narayan	Pankaj Narayan, Amoolya	S. Narayan	
September	Ganesha Matte Banda	HS Phani Ramachandra	Vijay Raghavendra, Pragnya, Vishal, Neethu, Ananth Nag, Vinaya Prasad	V. Manohar	
September	Gulabi Talkies	Girish Kasaravalli	Umashree, M. D. Pallavi Arun	Isaac Thomas Kottukapally	Released in film festivals
September	Dheemaku	Magesh Kumar G.	Naveen Krishna, Pavani, Flora Saini	Arjun Janya	
September	Patre Loves Padma	Chandrashekar Srivatsav	Patre Ajith, Kruthika, Deepika, Pavitra, Supritha	Arjun Janya	
September	Buddhivanta	Ramnath Rigvedhi	Upendra, Pooja Gandhi, Natanya Singh, Saloni Aswani, Suman Ranganathan, Brinda	Vijay Antony	Remake of Tamil film Naan Avan Illai
October	Vamshi	Prakash	Puneeth Rajkumar, Nikita Thukral, Lakshmi	R. P. Patnaik	
October	PUC	SR Brothers	Chetan Chandra, Harshika Poonacha, Charishma	J. Raviraj	
October	Chikkamagaloora Chikka Mallige	Channagangappa E.	Shravanth, Jagadish, Radhika Gandhi	K. Kalyan	
October	Baa Bega Chandamama	H. G. Murali	Deepak, Suhasini	H. G. Murali	
October	Manmatharu	B. Ramamurthy	Adi Lokesh, Shobhraj, Yashwanth, Chidananda	M S Maruthi	
October	Mandakini	Ramesh Surve	Rashmi, Chetan, Jayanthi, Sudharani	K. Kalyan	
October	Payana	Kiran Govi	Ravishankar Gowda, Ramanitu Chaudhary	V. Harikrishna	
October	Premigagi Naa	Snehapriya	Shankar, Vandhana	Rajesh Ramanath	
October	Sangaathi	Nandini Srinivasa Raju	Chethan, Aishwarya	Hamsalekha	
October	Heegu Unte	Madan Patel	Madan Patel, Jai Akash, Susheelkumar, Madhu Gomathi, Harshita	Aadi Mahesh Patel	
October	Sangama	Sanjay V. Babu	Ganesh, Vedhika	Devi Sri Prasad	
October	Psycho	Devadutta	Dhanush, Anita	Raghu Dixit	
October	Nannusire	Santosh-Velupriyan	Rahul, Keerthi	Premji Amaran	
November	Navagraha	Dinakar Thoogudeepa	Darshan, Tarun Chandra, Varsha, Sharmila Mandre, Vinod Prabhakar, Srujan Lokesh, Nagendra Urs, Dharma, Giri Dinesh	V. Harikrishna	
November	Slum Bala	D. Sumana Kittur	Duniya Vijay, Shubha Poonja, Umashree	Arjun Janya	
November	Naanu Gandhi	Nanjunde Gowda	Master Likith, Sundar Raj, Pramila Joshai	V. Manohar	
November	Maharshi	Krishna Brahma	Prashanth, Pooja Gandhi	Srimurli	
November	Bidda	D. Vishwa	Adi Lokesh, Yamini Sharma, Vanitha, Jai Jagadish, Umashree	Venkat-Narayan	
November	Ganga Kaveri	Vishnukant	Akshay, Mallika Kapoor, Mahhi Vij, Tara	K. Kalyan	
December	Akka Thangi	S. Mahendar	Shruthi, Rashmi, Mohan Shankar, Kishore	V. Manohar	
December	Janumada Gelathi	Dinesh Baboo	Srinagar Kitty, Pooja Gandhi	V. Manohar	
December	Paramesha Panwala	Mahesh Babu	Shiva Rajkumar, Surveen Chawla, Sonu	V. Harikrishna	
December	Pallavi Illada Charana	Shivaprabhu	Naga Kiran, Charulatha	Babji-Sandeep	
December	Sanchu	M. D. Kaushik	Charan Raj, Veda Prada	Raveesh A. T.	
December	Mast Maja Maadi	Anantha Raju	Sudeep, Jennifer Kotwal, Vijay Raghavendra, Komal Kumar, Diganth, Naga Kiran, Nagashekar	P. B. Balaji	
December	Murane Class Manja B.Com Bhagya	Sai Sagar	Arya, Archana, Ananth Nag	Venkat-Narayan	
December	Neenyare	Sindesh	Suraj, Ramya Barna	V. Manohar	
December	Rocky	S. K. Nagendra Urs	Yash, Bianca Desai, Santhosh, Jai Jagadish	Venkat-Narayan	
December	Haage Summane	Preetam Gubbi	Kiran Srinivas, Suhaasi	Mano Murthy	

== See also ==
- Kannada films of 2005
- Kannada films of 2006
- Kannada films of 2007
- Kannada films of 2009
- Kannada films of 2010
- Cinema of Karnataka
