= Preethi Hangama =

- Directed by: Vivek Raj
- Written by: Dialogue: R Rajashekhar; M S Ramesh
- Screenplay by: Vivek Raj
- Story by: Vivek Raj
- Produced by: Pushpa Eknath; Rashmi Eknath
- Starring: Vivek Raj; Shubha Poonja
- Cinematography: Chandrasekhar
- Edited by: Vinod Manohar
- Music by: Raj Kiran
- Release date: 27 August 2010
- Country: India
- Language: Kannada

Preethi Hangama (transl. Love season) is a 2010 Indian Kannada-language romantic drama film directed by Vivek Raj and starring himself and Shubha Poonja. The film's story is based on How to Lose a Guy in 10 Days (2003).

== Cast ==
- Vivek Raj as Raj
- Shubha Poonja as Geetha
- Anant Nag as Raj's father
- Avinash as Geetha's boss
- Urvashi
- Padmaja Rao
- Malathi Sardeshpande

== Soundtrack ==
The music was composed by debutante Raj Kiran. The lyrics were written by Kaviraj. The audio function was held on 9 April 2010.

Preethi Hangama

Soundtrack album by Raj Kiran
- Released: 2010
- Recorded: 2010
- Genre: Feature film soundtrack
- Length: 25:24
- Language: Kannada

Track listing
No.	Title	Singer(s)	Length
1.	"Himse Himse"	Karthik, K. S. Chithra	4:02
2.	"Surivaaga"	Naresh Iyengar	4:33
3.	"Moda Modalu"	Karthik, Nanditha	3:57
4.	"Chellu Chelluva"	Tippu, Inchara	4:03
5.	"Manasu Manasugalige"	Rajesh Krishnan	4:44
6.	"Nanu Nanna Kanasu"	Arya, Nanditha	4:05
Total length:			25:24

== Reception ==
A critic from The Times of India rated the film 2 1/2 out of 5 stars and wrote that "Vivek Raj, who doubles as director and hero in his maiden venture, has selected a good story but fails to impress with poor script and amateurish narration". A critic from Rediff.com gave the film a rating of one out of five stars and wrote that "In a nutshell, this 'hangama' is best avoided". A critic from Deccan Herald wrote that "Vivek would do better to enroll in a film school. Time the film chamber acted on it’s promise requiring newbies to be trained before setting them loose among the unsuspecting audience". V. S. Rajapur of IANS gave the film a rating of 1 out of 5 stars and wrote that "Give Preethi Hangama a miss". A critic from Indiaglitz gave the film a rating of 6 out of 10 stars and wrote that "Compared to various inconsequential films of today Vivek Raj's film Preethiya Hangama is fair. The screenplay tautness should have been there and no point in explaining what the characters are up to".
