= Yuga (2007 film) =

- DVD cover
- Directed by: Chandra
- Starring: Duniya Vijay; Kavya
- Cinematography: Venus Murthy
- Music by: Arjun Janya
- Release date: 30 October 2007
- Country: India
- Language: Kannada

Yuga is a 2007 Indian Kannada-language action drama film directed by Chandra and starring Duniya Vijay and Kavya in her film debut. This film was Vijay's first release after the success of Duniya (2007) and was a box office failure despite initially releasing to houseful theatres and running for fifty days. His next film Chanda (2007) released weeks after this film.

== Cast ==
- Duniya Vijay as Yuga
- Kavya as Harini
- Sudha Belawadi
- Mico Nagaraj
- Killer Venkatesh

== Soundtrack ==
The music was composed by Arjun Janya, who used to worked under V. Manohar.

No.	Title	Singers	Length
1.	"Chenda Kane Chenda"	Kailash Kher, Srinivas, Shreya Ghoshal
2.	"Hrudaya Hrudaya"	Tippu
3.	"Kitti Kitti"	Badriprasad, Shankar Shanbhogue, Dr. Shamitha Malnad
4.	"Yaamaridhre"	Ranjitha
5.	"Yaavano Yaavano"	Shreya Ghoshal, Arjun Janya

== Reception ==
A critic from Rediff.com wrote that "Yuga will disappoint even the ardent fans of Vijay". Film critic R. G. Vijayasarathy of IANS wrote that "Totally Yuga is a listless film which has no basic plot. The film has a poor script and bad narration".
