= Veera Bahu (film) =

- DVD cover
- Directed by: S. Mahendar
- Written by: S. Mahendar
- Produced by: Sandesh Nagaraj
- Starring: Duniya Vijay; Nidhi Subbaiah; Rangayana Raghu
- Cinematography: Ananth Urs
- Edited by: K. M. Prakash
- Music by: V. Harikrishna
- Release date: 18 February 2011
- Running time: 2 hours 45 minutes
- Country: India
- Language: Kannada

Veera Bahu is a 2011 Kannada film in the action genre starring Duniya Vijay and Nidhi Subbaiah in the lead roles. The film has been directed and written by S. Mahendar and produced by Sandesh Nagaraj under Sandesh Combines. V. Harikrishna has composed the music.

== Plot ==
Vijay and Rangayana Raghu play the role of graveyard protector while Nidhi plays the role of an Iyengari girl.

== Cast ==
- Duniya Vijay as Veerabahu
- Nidhi Subbaiah as Devi
- Vinaya Prasad
- Rangayana Raghu as Amase
- M.N Lakshmi Devi
- Raju Talikote
- A. T. Raghu
- Avinash
- Kishori Ballal

== Soundtrack ==
| # | Title | Singers |
|---|---|---|
| 1 | "Ding Diga Ding" | Tippu |
| 2 | "Hetthavalu Yaaru" | L. N. Shastry |
| 3 | "Neenello" | Rajesh Krishnan, Srivardhini |
| 4 | "Raave Raave" | Vijay Prakash |
| 5 | "Ringa Ringa Roja" | Hemanth Kumar |

== Reception ==
=== Critical response ===
A critic from The Times of India scored the film at 3 out of 5 stars and wrote "Hats off to Vijay for his outstanding performance as an innocent grave digger. Nidhi Subbaih excels with her excellent dialogue delivery and expressions. Rangayana Raghu has given life to his role. Music by V Harikrishna and cinematography by Ananth Urs is appreciable". Shruti Indira Lakshminarayana from Rediff.com scored the film at 1.5 out of 5 stars and says "The melodramatic and stretched climax also works against the film. Veera Bahu could have been an out of the box flick given the coming together of powerhouses like Mahender and Vijay. Sadly, though it disappoints". B S Srivani from Deccan Herald wrote "A fine performance by Rangayana Raghu, who does not go overboard, Raju Talikote’s wry humour, Anant Urs’ intelligent camerawork and excellent background score by Harikrishna all embellish Mahendar’s screenplay. Yes, the film drags on but this Veerabahu is served up with all the correct ingredients". A critic from Bangalore Mirror wrote "Vijay, Rangayana Raghu and Avinash fall victims to the limited scope their respective characters offer. Though there are flashes of brilliance in dialogues, the overall quality remains pathetic. The film has finesse in its looks, but not in the story.For those expecting some magic from the Mahendar-Vijay combination, Veerabahu is a big let-down". A critic from DNA wrote "Rangayana Raghu does his usual act, as do Avinash and Dharma who play the usual tough cops. Raju Talikote plays a man from Hubbali who offers good repartees. Nidhi has done a good job. Watch this film, it entertains in true mass style".
