= List of Kannada films of 2006 =

The following is a list of films produced in the Kannada film industry in India in 2006, presented in alphabetical order.

This year started with a major blow with the demise of icon and legend of Kannada Cinema, Dr Rajkumar.

Slowly, later cinemas like Naayi Neralu and Care of Footpath made waves across the country for its meaningful themes and messages. Commercially, My Autograph became one of top grossers, only to be surpassed by industry-hit and legacy movie, Mungaru Male by the end of the year. Mungaru Male became the first South Indian movie to cross 50 crores, grossing nearly 75 crores at the box office.

This movie turned the fate of director, Yogaraj Bhat and actors Ganesh and Pooja Gandhi to become one of the leading stars in the industry for several years.

Sudeep, Ganesh, Pavitra Lokesh, Ramya, Pooja Gandhi and Master Kishan were recognised for their performances and contribution for this year majorly.

== Highest grossing films ==
Rank	Title	Collection	Ref.
1.	Mungaru Male	₹70-80 crore (₹247.97-283.82 crore in 2025)	
2.	My Autograph	₹20 crore (₹70.2 crore in 2025)	
3.	Mandya	₹17 crore (₹59.67 crore in 2025)	
4.	Ajay	₹14 crore (₹50.14 crore in 2025)	
5.	Thandege Thakka Maga	₹10 crore (₹35.81 crore in 2025)	

== List of released films in 2006 ==
=== January–June ===
Opening		Title	Director	Cast	Music Director	Genre	Notes
J A N	7th	Mandya	Om Prakash Rao	Darshan, Rakshita, Radhika Kumaraswamy, Avinash	Gurukiran	Action	
J A N	13th	O Priyathama	Shivaprabhu	Ajay Rao, Sanchana, Geetha, Sharat Babu, Sudharani	Valisha - Sandeep	Romance	
J A N	19th	Shree	Prakash	Vijay Raghavendra, Jennifer Kotwal, Rahul Roy, Ananth Nag, Vinaya Prasad, Avinash	Valisha - Sandeep	Action / Drama	
J A N	27th	Veeru	S. Narayan	Pankaj Narayan, Umashree, Prakash Heggodu	S. Narayan	Drama	
J A N	27th	Mithayi Mane	Aarathi	Aditi, Surabhi J. Herur, Hanumantha Raju	N. S. Prasad	Drama	
F E B	3rd	Uppi Dada M.B.B.S.	D. Rajendra Babu	Upendra, Uma, Ananth Nag, Chi. Guru Dutt, Naveen Mayur, Rohini Hattangadi	R. P. Patnaik	Romance / Comedy / Drama	Remake of Hindi film Munnabhai M.B.B.S.
F E B	3rd	Eesha	K. A. Rahman Mustafa	Dheeraj, Neethu, Tara, Chitra Shenoy	Teja	Drama	
F E B	3rd	Bharathi	Krishne Gowda	Sadhana, Damini, Sridevi	Abhimanyu	Drama	
F E B	10th	Mata	Guruprasad	Jaggesh, Pari, Doddanna, R. N. Sudarshan, Tabla Nani, V. Biradar, Mandya Ramesh	V. Manohar	Satirical Comedy	
F E B	10th	Seven O' Clock	Santosh Rai Pathaje	Mithun Tejaswi, Pooja Kanwal, Sneha, Nithya, Komal Kumar, Sharan	M. S. Madhukar	Romance	
F E B	17th	My Autograph	Sudeep	Sudeep, Meena, Srinivasa Murthy, Sridevika, Deepu, Rashmi Kulkarni	Bharadwaj	Drama	Remake of Tamil film Autograph
F E B	17th	Suntaragaali	Sadhu Kokila	Darshan, Rakshita, Ashish Vidyarthi, Manya, Rangayana Raghu, Umashree	Sadhu Kokila	Action	
F E B	24th	Ramya Chaitra Kala	Sunil Kumar Desai	Sandeep, Manasi Parashar, Nanditha, Rahul Inapur	Shyam Sundar	Drama	
M A R	3rd	Gopi	G. K. Mudduraj	Sri Murali, Gowri Munjal, Doddanna, Tennis Krishna	Mani Sharma	Drama / Romance	Remake of Telugu film Murari
M A R	3rd	Shishya	Vasu	Deepak, Chaitra, Rangayana Raghu	V. Nagendra Prasad	Action	
M A R	10th	Hettavara Kanasu	Om Sai Prakash	Mayur Patel, Radhika Kumaraswamy, Sundar Raj, Pramila Joshai	Vandemataram Srinivas	Drama	
M A R	17th	Ashoka	Shivamani	Shiva Rajkumar, Sunitha Varma, Vinaya Prasad, Srinivasa Murthy	Sadhu Kokila	Action	
M A R	17th	Nidhi	Radhakrishna	Devaraj, Vinod Alva, Urvashi Patel, Sanghavi, Arjun	Rajesh Ramanath	Action	
M A R	24th	Hatavadi	V. Ravichandran	V. Ravichandran, Radhika Kumaraswamy, Doddanna, Avinash	V. Ravichandran	Drama	
M A R	31st	Thandege Thakka Maga	S. Mahendar	Upendra, Ambareesh, Laila Mehdin, Sakshi Shivanand	S. A. Rajkumar	Action / Drama	Remake of Tamil film Thevar Magan
A P R	7th	Shubham	Ravi Garani	Shivadwaj, Sanjitha, Loknath, Kishore	Gurukiran	Action	
A P R	14th	Sevanthi Sevanthi	S. Narayan	Vijay Raghavendra, Ramya, Doddanna, Komal Kumar	S. A. Rajkumar	Romance	
A P R	14th	Naaga	Y. Yesudoss	K. Shivram, Poonam, Ashwini, Lamboo Nagesh, Bank Janardhan	Venkat-Narayan	Action	
A P R	21st	Chellata	M. D. Sridhar	Ganesh, Rekha Vedavyas, Devaraj, Avinash, Umashree, Rangayana Raghu, Komal Kumar	Gurukiran	Romance	
A P R	28th	Ambi	V. Nagendra Prasad	Auditya, Manya, Shobharaj, Kishore	V. Nagendra Prasad	Action / Romance	
A P R	28th	Nanna Hendthi Kole	B. R. Keshav	Naveen Mayur, Rohini	M. S. Maruthi	Thriller	
M A Y	4th	Ajay	Meher Ramesh	Puneeth Rajkumar, Anuradha Mehta, Prakash Rai, Doddanna	Mani Sharma	Action	
M A Y	13th	Julie	Poornima Mohan	Dino Morea, Ramya, Sihi Kahi Chandru, Chitra Shenoy	Rajesh Ramanath	Romance	Remake of Hindi film Julie
M A Y	13th	Belli Betta	Shivaraj Hoskere	Sunil Raoh, Manya, Shivamani	A. T. Raveesh	Drama	
M A Y	13th	Thutturi	P. Sheshadri	H. G. Dattatreya, Dharma, Suchendra Prasad	Hamsalekha	Drama	
M A Y	19th	Thavarina Siri	Om Sai Prakash	Shiva Rajkumar, Daisy Bopanna, Ashitha, Ashwini, Mukhyamantri Chandru, Doddanna	Hamsalekha	Drama	
J U N	2nd	Miss California	Kodlu Ramakrishna	Diganth, Jhanavi, Soumya, Sharath Babu, Jayanthi, Bhavya	Ravi Dattatreya	Drama	Based on the novel by C. N. Muktha
J U N	8th	Dattha	Chi Guru Dutt	Darshan, Ramya, Keerthi Chawla, Vinaya Prasad, Srinath	R. P. Patnaik	Action	
J U N	15th	Honeymoon Express	Nagendra Magadi	Jaggesh, S. Narayan, Deepu, Santhoshi	R. P. Patnaik	Comedy	
J U N	23rd	Good Luck	S. Nandakumar	Aniruddha Jatkar, Radhika Kumaraswamy, Naveen Krishna, Damini	Rajesh Ramanath	Romance	
J U N	30th	Thirupathi	Shivamani	Sudeepa, Pooja Kanwal, Charan Raj, P. N. Sathya	Rajesh Ramanath	Action	

=== July – December ===
Opening		Title	Director	Cast	Music Director	Genre	Notes
J U L	7th	Cyanide	A. M. R. Ramesh	Ravi Kale, Tara, Avinash, Malavika Avinash, Nassar	Sandeep Chowta	Crime Thriller	
J U L	14th	Jackpot	N. M. Niranjan	Dhyan, Shubha Poonja, Harsha	Alwynn Fernandes; M. N. Krupakar	Romance / Comedy	
J U L	28th	Ganda Hendathi	Ravi Srivatsa	Vishal Hegde, Sanjjana, Thilak Shekar, Manju Bhashini	Gurukiran	Romance / Thriller	Remake of Hindi film Murder
J U L	28th	Neenello Naanalle	Dinesh Babu	Vishnuvardhan, Rakshita, Aniruddha Jatkar, Avinash	Ramesh Krishna	Drama	Remake of Telugu film Nuvvostanante Nenoddantana
A U G	4th	Gandugali Kumara Rama	H. R. Bhargava	Shiva Rajkumar, Laya, Anita Hassandani, Rambha, Avinash	Gurukiran	Period action	
A U G	11th	Mohini 9886788888	Rajendra Singh Babu	Auditya, Nassar, Riyaz Khan, Suhasini, Anu Prabhakar, Adi Lokesh	Hamsalekha	Horror / Thriller	
A U G	12th	Nanna Kanasina Hoove	S. M. Patil	Vinayak Joshi, Harish Raj, Keerthana, Preethi	N S Prasad	Romance	
S E P	1st	Odahuttidavalu	Om Sai Prakash	V. Ravichandran, Rakshita, Radhika Kumaraswamy, Komal Kumar, Rangayana Raghu	R. P. Patnaik	Romance / Drama	
S E P	8th	Maha Nagara	Eshwar	Vinod Prabhakar, Shilpa	Naga Mahesh	Action	
S E P	8th	Kadala Mage	Praveen Kumar	Diganth, Saritha Jain	S. P. Chandrakanth	Drama	Tulu film
S E P	8th	Gatti Taali Bitti Mela	Rajesh Kumar	Kashinath, Madhuri	Rajesh Ramanath	Romance / Comedy	
S E P	15th	Aishwarya	Indrajit Lankesh	Upendra, Deepika Padukone, Daisy Bopanna	Rajesh Ramanath	Romance	
S E P	21st	Jothe Jotheyali	Dinakar Thoogudeepa	Prem Kumar, Ramya, Komal Kumar	V. Harikrishna	Romance	
S E P	22nd	Autograph Please	Bharathi Shankar	Aakash Shetty, Sanjjana, Sangeetha Shetty, Dileep Raj, Naveen Krishna	Arjun Janya	Romance	
S E P	28th	Sirivantha	S. Narayan	Vishnuvardhan, Shruti, Doddanna	S. A. Rajkumar	Drama	Remake of Telugu film Aa Naluguru
O C T	6th	Ravi Shastri	M. S. Rajashekar; M. R. Raghavendra	V. Ravichandran, Sneha, Ananth Nag	Rajesh Ramanath	Comedy Drama	Remake of Tamil film Idhu Namma Aalu
O C T	20th	Thangigagi	P. N. Sathya	Darshan, Poonam Bajwa, Shwetha Chengappa, Hemanth G Nag Rangayana Raghu	Sadhu Kokila	Drama	Remake of Tamil film Thirupaachi
O C T	20th	Avanandre Avne	A. Venugopal	Naveen Mayur, Kangana	Sangeeth Sagar	Romance	
O C T	20th	Rambha	B. Ramamurthy	Chandrakanth, Nayana Krishna	Guru Prasad	Adult romance	
O C T	27th	Savira Mettilu	Puttanna Kanagal; K. S. L. Swamy	Kalyan Kumar, Jayanthi, Pandari Bai, Vajramuni, B. V. Radha, Ambareesh, Doddanna, Mukhyamantri Chandru	Vijaya Bhaskar; Pravin Godkhindi	Drama	Delayed film
N O V	10th	Hubli	Om Prakash Rao	Sudeepa, Rakshita, Anantha Velu, Tarakesh Patel	A. R. Hemanth	Action	
N O V	10th	Pandavaru	K. V. Raju	Ambareesh, Devaraj, Shashikumar, Ramkumar, Aishwarya, Gurleen Chopra, Tara	Hamsalekha	Drama	Remake of Malayalam film Godfather
N O V	24th	Tananam Tananam	Kavita Lankesh	Ramya, Rakshita, Shaam, Girish Karnad, Bharathi Vishnuvardhan	K. Kalyan	Romance	
N O V	24th	Kannadada Kanda	B. N. Vijayakumar	Vinod Raj, Daksha, Kishore, Leelavathi	H. Gurunath	Action	
N O V	24th	Student	M. D. Sridhar	Mayur Patel, Pooja Kanwal, Sarath Babu, Komal Kumar, Vinaya Prasad	R. P. Patnaik	Romance	
N O V	24th	Care of Footpath	Master Kishan	Master Kishan, Jackie Shroff, Tara, B. Jayashree	Ravi Dattatreya	Drama	
D E C	1st	Madana	Jai Jagadish	Auditya, Samiksha, Saaniya, Ramesh Bhat	Yuvan Shankar Raja	Romance / Thriller	Remake of Tamil film Manmadhan
D E C	8th	Tenali Rama	Nagendra Magadi	Jaggesh, Ramesh Aravind, Deepu, Rangayana Raghu, Srinath	R. P. Patnaik	Comedy	
D E C	15th	Nage Habba	Adarsha	Adarsha, Sunaina, Sadhu Kokila	Adarsha	Comedy	
D E C	22nd	Kallarali Hoovagi	T. S. Nagabharana	Vijay Raghavendra, Uma, Ananth Nag, Bharathi Vishnuvardhan, Sumalatha	Hamsalekha	Drama	
D E C	22nd	Neelakanta	Om Sai Prakash	V. Ravichandran, Namitha, Sridevika, Sadhu Kokila, Vijay Kashi, Sujatha	V. Ravichandran	Romance	
D E C	29th	Mungaru Male	Yogaraj Bhat	Ganesh, Pooja Gandhi, Ananth Nag, Diganth	Mano Murthy	Romance	
D E C	29th	A Aa E Ee	N. R. Nanjunde Gowda	Ramesh Aravind, Prema	V. Manohar	Drama	
D E C	29th	Geeya Geeya	Krishna Reddy	Naveen Krishna, Swarnamalya	Bhavatharini	Romance	
D E C	29th	Koti Chennaya	Anand P. Raju	Balakrishna, Shekar Kotyan	V. Manohar	Drama	Tulu film
