= Jackpot (2006 film) =

2006 film

- VCD Cover
- Directed by: Niranjan
- Produced by: Anekal Balraj
- Starring: Dhyan; Harsha; Shubha Poonja; Antara Biswas
- Cinematography: P.K.H. Das
- Edited by: Nagendra Urs
- Music by: Alwin; Krupakar; Hameed; Dharma Vish (Background Score)
- Release date: 14 July 2006
- Country: India
- Language: Kannada

Jackpot is a 2006 Indian Kannada romantic-drama film directed by Niranjan featuring Dhyan, Harsha, Shubha Poonja and Antara Biswas in the lead roles. The film was released on 14 July 2006. It received mixed reviews. Sudeep, Daisy Bopanna and Sunil Raoh make guest appearances.

== Cast ==
- Dhyan as Raja
- Harsha as Ramesh
- Shubha Poonja as Preethi
- Antara Biswas as Laila
- Raju Ananthaswamy
- Sadhu Kokila as Black Magician
- Vaijanath Biradar
- Sudeep (Guest appearance in "Onde Ondu Aaseyu")
- Daisy Bopanna (Guest appearance in "Sakha Sakha")
- Sunil Raoh (Guest appearance in "Jackpot")
- Sanjjana (Guest appearance in "Jackpot")
- Aindrita Ray (Guest appearance in "Laila Chingaari Laila")

== Soundtrack ==
The film features background score and soundtrack composed by Alwin, Krupakar, Hameed and lyrics by V. Manohar, N M Niranjan, Allwyn, and Ram Narayan.

Jackpot

Soundtrack album by Alwin, Krupakar, Hameed
- Genre: Feature film soundtrack
- Language: Kannada
- Label: Santhosh Music

No.	Title	Singer(s)	Length
1.	"Sakha Sakha"	Rajesh Krishnan, Lakshmi Manmohan
2.	"Jackpot"	Allwyn, Dharma
3.	"Ee Preethige Hoo Sethuve"	Gurukiran, Nanditha
4.	"Baa O Preethi Baa"	Sunil Raoh, Rachana
5.	"Laila Chingaari Laila"	Chaitra H. G.
6.	"Onde Ondu Aaseyu"	Hemanth, Chaithra H. G.

== Reception ==
A critic from The Hindu wrote that "Intelligently and neatly trimmed the fairytale like plot attempts to understand the pleasures and pains of love and the demands of genuine friendship among the youth". A critic from Sify wrote that "On the whole this film disappoints and look out for some other entertainment instead of watching this dull film". A critic from Rediff.com wrote that "Avoid this one". A critic from Chitraloka.com wrote that "Good songs, neat and tidy flow of the film despite being a fantasy in some portions [make] it is worth watching".
