= Bete (2011 film) =

Indian Kannada-language film

- Directed by: Srinivas Kaushik
- Written by: Srinivas Kaushik
- Produced by: Auditor Srinivas
- Starring: Ayesha; Akshay; Ananth Nag; Ishitha Vyas; Adi Lokesh
- Music by: Akhil G.
- Production company: Sri Parameshwari Arts
- Release date: 16 December 2011
- Country: India
- Language: Kannada

Bete (transl. Hunter) is a 2011 Kannada-language film directed by Srinivas Kaushik. The film stars Ayesha, Akshay, Ananth Nag, Ishitha Vyas and Adi Lokesh an action-oriented venture, was released on 16 December 2011.

== Plot ==
The film is a classic Kannada masala entertainer that mixes action, romance, and drama. It centers on a tough hero who finds himself in a whirlwind of intense fights and thrilling action scenes. Alongside the chaos, he falls for a love interest, sparking a romantic track filled with emotion and charm. The story follows his struggle to defeat enemies, protect his loved ones, and win the girl, all while keeping the audience hooked with its fast-paced, dramatic twists and larger-than-life moments.

== Cast ==
- Ayesha as Ashwini Chengappa
- Akshay as Sagar
- Ananth Nag as Ashwini’s father
- Pavithra Lokesh as Ashwini’s mother
- Ishitha Vyas as Kavitha
- Adi Lokesh
- Harish Roy
- Auditor Srinivas
- Killer Venkatesh
- Roopesh Thimmaji

== Soundtrack ==
No.	Title	Singer(s)	Length
1.	"Kirriku Maado"	Chaitra H. G.
2.	"Cheluva Sanjeyolage"	Santhosh Venky, Sneha Nannival

== Reception ==
A review on News18 labelled Bete a "sheer waste of time," criticizing its lack of originality and poor execution. Similarly, Indo-Asian News Service’s review, while not detailed in its critique, suggested a lackluster response to the film’s narrative and presentation. Deccan Herald also published a review that echoed these sentiments, pointing to the film’s inability to engage audiences effectively. Critic from The New Indian Express wrote "It is worth watching if you want to see Srinivas in a new avatar and Ayesha in the role of a journalist"
