= Hemanth (singer) =

Indian Kannada singer

- Born: Hemanth Subramanya; Bangalore, Karnataka, India
- Occupations: Singer, composer
- Years active: 1999–present

Hemanth Subramanya known by his stage name as Hemanth, is a playback singer in Kannada cinema.

== Early life ==
Hemanth was born in a family of musicians at Bangalore, India. His mother Rathna Sastry is a classical singer and his father Subramanya Sastry is a retired economics professor. He considers his mother as his first Guru.

Hemanth practised Carnatic classical music under R. K. Srikantan and his son R. S. Ramakanth, Nagavalli Nagaraj and H. K. Narayana for about a decade.

== Career ==
Hemanth started his film career as a music assistant to music director Hamsalekha, who also introduced him to the Kannada cinema. His foray into the film world was made in 2000 for the blockbuster movie Preethse. Hemanth replaced Udit Narayan in his debut song "Preetse Preetse" of movie Preethse composed by his mentor Hamsalekha.

Hemanth became a popular and prominent playback singer in Kannada cinema since his debut hit song "Preetse Preetse". Hemanth rendered his voice to many actors including Shiva Rajkumar, Puneeth Rajkumar, Upendra, Ganesh, Sudeep, Srinagar Kitty, Darshan, Yash to name a few. He has sung songs in composition of Hamsalekha, V. Manohar, Gurukiran, Mano Murthy, Arjun Janya, V. Sridhar, V. Harikrishna, Sadhu Kokila, Ricky Kej to name a few.

He has hosted and performed for TV musical shows in leading Kannada channels. "Kuhu Kuhu" for Udaya TV, "Gunagaana", "Sa Re Ga Ma Pa" and "Sa Re Ga Ma Pa little champs" for Zee Kannada TV to name a few. He has performed live worldwide, including at Muskat for the show "Gana Lahiri" organized by Kannada Sangha in 2008, at Dubai in 2012. Other live shows at Bahrain in 2013, at Nairobi during "Karunada Habba" Feb 2018.

Hemanth has also sung song in music albums "Life is Beautiful" and "Baa Sangaati" composed by Techies4Kannada and orchestral music from the Czech Republic. He is also featured in "Nee Badalaadare" music album composed by Ricky Kej which has patriotic songs in Kannada.

== Discography ==
Partial list of songs sung by Hemanth.

Year	Film	Music Composer	Song	Notes
1998	Mr. Putsami	V. Manohar	Baa Baa Baa Baare	
1998	Mr. Putsami	V. Manohar	Yaaravalu Yaaravalu	
2000	Preethse	Hamsalekha	Preethse Preethse	
2001	Kurigalu Saar Kurigalu	Hamsalekha	Ayyo Hogi Saar	
2001	Kurigalu Saar Kurigalu	Hamsalekha	Chori Chakori	
2001	Kurigalu Saar Kurigalu	Hamsalekha	Sondi Sondi	
2001	Kurigalu Saar Kurigalu	Hamsalekha	Nidire Baradire	
2001	Sri Manjunatha	Hamsalekha	Dharmajyothi Mangala Sloka	
2001	Sri Manjunatha	Hamsalekha	Hey Hey Bindhige	
2001	Sri Manjunatha	Hamsalekha	Om Aksharaya Namaha	
2002	Super Star	Hamsalekha	Bakra Bakra	
2002	Super Star	Hamsalekha	Problem Problem	
2003	Kutumba	Gurukiran	Nee Nan Appikollalve	
2003	Khushi	Gurukiran	We Will Do It	
2003	Raktha Kanneeru	Sadhu Kokila	Danger	
2004	Sarvabhouma	Hamsalekha	Edege Gundina Maleya	
2004	Sarvabhouma	Hamsalekha	Kalnan Magandee Prema	
2005	Nenapirali	Hamsalekha	Hey Beladingale	
2006	Veeru	S. Narayan	Naa Ede Thumbi Haadide	
2006	Mungaru Male	Mano Murthy	Suvvi Suvvali	
2006	Kallarali Hoovagi	Hamsalekha	Kallarali Hoovagi	
2006	Kallarali Hoovagi	Hamsalekha	Bhoomi Eee Bhoomi Mele	
2006	Kallarali Hoovagi	Hamsalekha	Sampige Siddesha	
2007	Lava Kusha	Gurukiran	Lava Kusha	
2011	Kirataka	V. Manohar	Dhanakku Dandaa	
2007	Honganasu	Hamsalekha	Kandukonde	
2007	Duniya	V. Manohar	Preethi Maaye Hushaaru	
2008	Mussanje Maatu	V. Sridhar	Mussanje Mathali	
2008	Inthi Ninna Preethiya	Sadhu Kokila	Mugiyada Kavite Neenu	
2008	Inthi Ninna Preethiya	Sadhu Kokila	Hoo Kanasa Jokali	
2010	Pancharangi	Mano Murthy	Pancharangi HaaDugalu	
2011	Lifeu Ishtene	Mano Murthy	Junior Devadasa	
2012	Krantiveera Sangolli Rayanna	V. Harikrishna	Gandu Mettida	
2012	Krantiveera Sangolli Rayanna	V. Harikrishna	Janani Janmabhoomi	
2013	Bulbul	V. Harikrishna	Nille Nille Kaveri	
2013	Raja Huli	Hamsalekha	Loveenalli Bidre	
2015	Ond Chance Kodi	Mysore Gopi	Gelluve Gelluve	
2015	DK	Arjun Janya	India-Pakistana	
2015	Mr. Airavata	V. Harikrishna	There was a Ajji	
2016	Jaggu Dada	V. Harikrishna	Funtanatun, Thale Keduthe Reprise	
2018	Kismath	Rajesh Murugesan	Kabaddi Kabaddi	
2024	Kaatera	V. Harikrishna	Yava Janamada Gelathi	

== Television ==
Year	Television	Role	Notes
2021–2022	Sa Re Ga Ma Pa Championship	Mentor	

== Awards ==
Year	Award	Notes
2007	Karnataka State Film Award for Best Male Playback Singer For Janapada	
2007	Filmfare Award for Best Male Playback Singer – Kannada For Kallarali Hoovagi	
2007	Karnataka Chitra Rasikara Sangha Awards for Best Singer 2007 For Mungaru Male	
2006	Karnataka State Film Award for Best Male Playback Singer For Kallarali Hoovagi	
2001	Best Playback singer (male) – Exo Asianet Kaveri Film Awards 2001 For Preethse, Song "Preethse Preethse"	
2001	Best Playback singer (male) – Asianet Suvarna TV ( Star TV ) Award 2001 For Preethse, Song "Preethse Preethse"	
2001	Best Playback singer (male) – Suprabhatha Award 2001 For Preethse, Song "Preethse Preethse"	
