= Mr. Puttaswamy =

- Video cover
- Directed by: V. Umakanth
- Produced by: H. C. Srinivas
- Starring: Shiva Rajkumar; Laali; Suman; Srinath
- Cinematography: P. K. H. Das
- Edited by: B. S. Kemparaj
- Music by: V. Manohar
- Production company: Sri Puttamma Productions
- Release date: 7 August 1998
- Running time: 148 minutes
- Country: India
- Language: Kannada

Mr. Puttaswamy is a 1998 Indian Kannada-language fantasy film directed by V. Umakanth and produced by H. C. Srinivas. The film features Shiva Rajkumar, Laali and Suman in the lead roles. The film's score and soundtrack is composed by V. Manohar.

== Plot ==
In order to escape from the clutches of her uncle Nanjunda who wants to get her married to his son to usurp her ancestral property, she finds a statue of Puttaswamy in a museum and brings it to life.

== Cast ==
- Shiva Rajkumar as Putsamy
- Laali as Asha
- Suman as King Krishnadevaraya
- Avinash as Nanjunda
- Srinath
- Lokesh
- Bank Janardhan
- Shobaraj as Ayanka
- Jyothi
- M. S. Umesh
- Sanketh Kashi
- Mandeep Roy
- Rangayana Raghu

== Soundtrack ==
The soundtrack of the film was composed by V. Manohar. The film marked the singing debut of Hemanth Kumar.

Track listing
No.	Title	Lyrics	Singer(s)	Length
1.	"Yaaramma"	V. Manohar	Mano
2.	"Jaya Hey Bhavani"	V. Manohar	L. N. Shastry
3.	"Teen Teen Teen"	V. Manohar	Nanditha
4.	"Baa Baa Baa Baare"	V. Manohar	Hemanth Kumar
5.	"Kanmani Kanmani"	V. Manohar	L. N. Shastry
6.	"Yaaravalu Yaaravalu"	V. Manohar	Hemanth Kumar, Archana Udupa
7.	"Mr. Putsami"		Gurukiran

== Release ==
The film was dubbed in Telugu as Ranadheerudu by Bhaskara Films.
