= Slum Bala =

- DVD cover
- Directed by: Sumana Kittur
- Produced by: Syed Amaan Bacchan; M S Ravindra
- Starring: Duniya Vijay; Shubha Poonja
- Cinematography: A C Mahendar
- Edited by: Deepu S Kumar
- Music by: Arjun Janya
- Release date: 7 November 2008
- Country: India
- Language: Kannada

Slum Bala is a 2008 Indian Kannada-language film directed by Sumana Kittur, starring Duniya Vijay, Shubha Poonja and Shashi Kumar in lead roles.

== Cast ==
- Duniya Vijay as Balakrishna alias Slum Bala
- Shubha Poonja as Mallige
- Shashi Kumar as Police Inspector Shantaram
- Umashree
- Girija Lokesh
- B. Suresha as Prasad Nayak
- Achyuth Kumar as Shanker
- Dharma as Bhadravathi Manja
- Sathya as Razak
- Prakash
- Rohith Nagesh
- Dr Banjagere Jayaprakash

== Production ==
Sumana Kittur narrated the story of Slum Bala to Duniya Vijay, who agreed to star in the film only if Kittur directed it.

== Music ==
Slum Bala

Soundtrack album by Arjun Janya
- Released: 2008
- Recorded: 2008
- Genre: Feature film soundtrack
- Length: 12:16
- Language: Kannada

Official audio
- Slum Bala - Full Album on YouTube

Track listing
No.	Title	Singer(s)	Length
1.	"Ale Aleyo"	Nanditha, Rajesh Krishnan	5:03
2.	"Manasu Rangagide"	Nanditha, Karthik	4:33
3.	"Ale Aleyo (Sad)"	Nanditha, Rajesh Krishnan	2:40

== Reception ==
=== Critical response ===
R G Vijayasarathy of Rediff.com scored the film at 3 out of 5 stars and says "Music director Arjun has done remarkable job both as a composer and back ground scorer. Slum Bala is a must-see film for all those who love good and realistic cinema". Bangalore Mirror wrote "A disappointment for Vijay’s fans is the absence of daring stunts he is known for. The film is a den of thieves. Apart from the mother and the love interest of Bala (played by Shuba Poonja), every other character is either corrupt or has a negative shade. This could have helped if the film was a thriller. But it seems the director was more intent documenting the life of Slum Bala than provide a quicker narrative of a corrupt society". The New Indian Express wrote "Nayak's friend promises not only to cancel the police order against Bala but also to handover the cable business to the latter. Bala accomplishes the task but circumstances compel Shantaram to eliminate Bala. Slum Bala is a take on politics".
