= RX Soori =

- RX Soori Poster
- Directed by: Sreejay
- Screenplay by: Sreejay
- Story by: Sreejay
- Produced by: Suresh
- Starring: Duniya Vijay; Akankshaa; P. Ravi Shankar
- Cinematography: H. C. Venu
- Edited by: Deepu S. Kumar
- Music by: Arjun Janya
- Distributed by: Suresh Arts Productions
- Release date: 4 September 2015
- Country: India
- Language: Kannada

RX Soori is a 2015 Indian Kannada-language romantic crime drama film directed and written by Sreejay, making his debut direction. It stars Duniya Vijay, Akankshaa and P. Ravi Shankar. The film is produced by Suresh of Govindaya Namaha fame. The music was composed by Arjun Janya. The film marks the acting debut for the lead actress Akankshaa. The principal photography of the film began in August 2014, and the film was released on 4 September 2015.

According to the media reports, the film is based on the life story of Std. Kumara, a gangster in the Karnataka province of Bangalore, Avalahalli.

== Cast ==
- Duniya Vijay as Soori
- Akankshaa
- P. Ravi Shankar as Paritala Ravi
- Adi Lokesh
- Manju Prabhas
- Patre Nagaraj
- Vinaya Prasad
- Bullet Prakash
- Sadhu Kokila
- Avinash
- Shobaraj
- Mico Nagaraj
- Rajeev Gowda
- Prashanth Siddi
- Thulasi Shivamani

== Soundtrack ==
The soundtrack is composed and written by Arjun Janya. D-Beats, a company owned by musician V. Harikrishna has bought the audio rights of the film. Popular vocalist K. J. Yesudas has recorded a song for the film and this is his first song with the composer.

=== Track listing ===
No.	Title	Lyrics	Singer(s)	Length
1.	"Dove Hodibyada"	Shreejay, Sudarshan	Vijay Prakash, Annupamaa, Naveen Sajju
2.	"Suri Suri"	K. Kalyan	Harsha Sadananda, Shreya Ghoshal
3.	"Butte Butte"	V. Nagendra Prasad	Naveen Sajju, Indu Nagaraj
4.	"Huttodu Navello"	Shreejay	K. J. Yesudas
