= Jayammana Maga =

2013 Kannada-language horror film

- Film poster
- Directed by: Vikas
- Written by: Chintan [dialogue]
- Screenplay by: Vikas; Chintan
- Story by: Duniya Vijay
- Produced by: Duniya Vijay; Ramesh
- Starring: Duniya Vijay; Dr. Bharathi; Kalyani Raju
- Cinematography: Sugnaan
- Edited by: Sanath; Suresh
- Music by: Arjun Janya
- Production companies: Vijay Pictures; Duniya Talkies
- Release date: 15 August 2013 (India)
- Country: India
- Language: Kannada

Jayammana Maga (transl. Jayamma's son) is a 2013 Indian Kannada-language horror thriller film directed and written by Vikas, marking his debut venture. Duniya Vijay, besides acting, makes his debut as a producer with this film along with his friend Ramesh for the "Duniya Talkies" production house. The other primary cast include Dr. Bharathi, Rangayana Raghu, Kalyani Raju, N. L. Narendra Babu amongst others.

The film features the musical score by Arjun Janya, cinematography by Sugnaan and lyrics by Yogaraj Bhat and Vijay. The film story revolves around the concept of Black magic and Human sacrifice with the battle between the good and the evil.

The movie made its theatrical release on 15 August 2013 on the Indian independence day. The film opened to positive reviews with critics mentioning about Vijay's career to have resurrected back and given him a new lease of life.

== Cast ==
- Duniya Vijay as Naga
- Dr. Bharathi as Divya
- Kalyani Raju as Jayamma
- N. L. Narendra Babu
- Rangayana Raghu as Bhagavanta
- Honnavalli Krishna
- Raghava Uday as Raktaksha
- Prashanth as Simha
- Nagaraj Kote as a Politician
- Muni

== Soundtrack ==
Jayammana Maga

Soundtrack album by Arjun Janya
- Released: 2013
- Recorded: 2013
- Genre: Feature film soundtrack
- Length: 15:58
- Language: Kannada

Official audio
- Jayammana Maga - Full Album on YouTube

The music for the film is composed by Arjun Janya. One song lyrics is written by Duniya Vijay himself.

Track listing
No.	Title	Singer(s)	Length
1.	"Baa Baare Cheluve"	Arjun Janya, Supriya Lohith	4:17
2.	"Bell Bottom"	Chandan Shetty, Tippu, Priyanka Rohith, Baby Rajitha	3:23
3.	"Nalli Katte"	Vijay Prakash	3:53
4.	"Om Shakthi Mantram"	Kaushik Harsha, Anuradha Bhat	0:43
5.	"Shakthi Kodu"	Hemanth Kumar	4:22
Total length:			15:58

== Reception ==
=== Critical response ===
GS Kumar from The Times of India scored the film at 3.5 out of 5 stars and says "It’s not the role that Rangayana Raghu ever shines. Editor Sanath Suresh has done a perfect job with music director Arjun Janya giving some lovely tunes. Sugnan, with beautiful camera work, has added value to the story". B S Srivani from Deccan Herald wrote "Raghav Uday, as the tantrik Raktaksha, finally comes into his own. The lanky brother of Surabhi in Dushta is all brawn and menace here. Kalyani, as Jayamma, is spunky and believable. Narendra Babu, Rangayana Raghu and others are ok. Newcomer Dr Bharathi fits the bill but has precious little to do nearer to the climax". A critic from Bangalore Mirror wrote "Arjun Janya’s music fits the bill perfectly. For a debutant director, Vikas shows tremendous promise. He is one of the new breed of commercial film directors in Kannada to look out for in the future. This film is not for kids and those who take ghosts seriously. Others can hope to entertain themselves while being scared". A critic from Sify.com wrote "Arjun Janya disappoints in the music but nullifies it through a brilliant background score. The movie falls into horror-thriller and of late top stars have not been seen in such projects. Vijay has certainly made a bold attempt through his maiden home production, and it will be a landmark movie in his career". A Sharadhaa from The New Indian Express wrote "As for Vijay, who turned producer with this film, it is paisa vasool time as the film is bound to attracts staunch believers of the Om Shakti movement. Verdict: Jayammana Maga is serious, straightforward and a cinematic surprise, something that is hard to come by these days. Watch it".
