= Kanteerava =

- Film Poster
- Directed by: Tushar Ranganath
- Written by: S. S. Rajamouli
- Based on: Simhadri by V. Vijayendra Prasad
- Produced by: Ramu
- Starring: Duniya Vijay; Shuba Poonja; Rishika Singh
- Cinematography: Dasari Srinivasa Rao
- Edited by: T. Shashikumar; Deepu S. Kumar
- Music by: Chakri
- Production company: Ramu Enterprises
- Release date: 21 January 2011
- Running time: 148 minutes
- Country: India
- Language: Kannada

Kanteerava is a 2011 Kannada-language action horror film directed by Tushar Ranganath and produced by Ramu. It is a remake of the Telugu film Simhadri (2003). The film features Duniya Vijay, Shuba Poonja and Rishika Singh in the lead roles. Chakri has composed the music for the film. The movie was dubbed and released in Hindi as Himmat The Power.

== Plot ==
An orphan and good hearted lad Kanthi (Duniya Vijay) is adopted and grows up under Ramachandrappa (Srinivasa Murthy) family care in Bangalore. The bond they share is like father and son. Kasturi (Rishika Singh) is Ramachandrappa's granddaughter, and she likes Kanthi a lot. Once a week, Kanthi meets a mentally challenged girl named Indhira (Shubha Poonja). He entertains her and provides money for her caretakers.

When Ramachandrappa and his wife (Sangeeta) discover Kasturi wants to marry Kanthi, Ramachandrappa decides to get them married. He makes a formal announcement to officially adopt Kanthi. At this time, it is revealed that Kanthi is very close to Indu. The alliance breaks off when Kanthi refuses to leave Indu (who is suspected to be his mistress).

== Cast ==
- Duniya Vijay as Kanteerava
- Shuba Poonja as Indira
- Rishika Singh as Kasturi
- Rahul Kadam as Rahul
- Srinivasa Murthy as Ramachandrappa
- Yamuna as Ramachandrappa's daughter
- Mukesh Rishi as Bala Sab (some archival footage)
- Rahul Dev as Bala Nair
- Sadhu Kokila
- Mandya Ramesh as Mandya
- Sangeetha as Ramachandrappa's wife
- Bhanuchander
- Sanketh Kashi
- G. V. Sudhakar Naidu (archival footage)

== Soundtrack ==
Kanteerava

Soundtrack album by Chakri
- Released: 21 November 2010
- Recorded: 2010
- Genre: Feature film soundtrack
- Length: 24:12
- Label: Anand Audio Video
- Producer: Chakri

Chakri chronology
| Gandedhe (2010) | Kanteerava (2010) | Wanted (2011) |

Chakri has composed 6 songs for the film.

Track-List
| No. | Title | Lyrics | Singer(s) | Length |
|---|---|---|---|---|
| 1. | "Bithri Bithri" | V. Nagendra Prasad | Tippu, Aishwarya | 4:16 |
| 2. | "Cheluve Cheluve" | Jayanth Kaikini | Karthik | 4:17 |
| 3. | "Kaali Mankaliyamma" | V. Nagendra Prasad | Uma Neha | 2:46 |
| 4. | "Singamalai" | V. Nagendra Prasad | Ramana | 3:31 |
| 5. | "Onde Baalu" | Yogaraj Bhat | Mano, Anuradha Sriram | 4:41 |
| 6. | "O Priya" | Tushar Ranganath | Simha, Madhuri | 4:41 |
| Total length: | | | | 24:12 |

== Reception ==
=== Critical response ===
Shruti Indira Lakshminarayana from Rediff.com scored the film at 2 out of 5 stars and says "Music by Chakri is okay though a song on female deities backed by folk music stands out. 'Fight' your way through crime is what Kanteerava says. Yes, action is what dominates the film". A critic from The Times of India scored the film at 3.5 out of 5 stars and wrote "Vijay is amazing in his fighting and sentimental sequences. Shubha Poonja impresses with a lively performance. Rishika Singh makes a positive beginning in her first acting essay. Yamuna is a treat to watch. Srinivasamurthy is graceful. Cinematography by Dasari Seenu and music by Chakri are good". A critic from Bangalore Mirror wrote "The background music is loud and hampers a decent sleep while watching the film. The camerawork is better than most other aspects of the film. Sukadhare’s break from filmmaking has not worked for him or the audience". Svetlana Mary Lasrado from Deccan Herald wrote "Rishika as a newbie has done justice to her role. Vijay steals the thunder with his dialogue delivery and fights. For good dose of action, Kanteerava does strike a chord".
