= Ee Rajeev Gandhi Alla =

- Directed by: Ravi Srivatsa
- Screenplay by: R Rajashekhar; M S Ramesh
- Starring: Vijay Raghavendra; Rakshitha; Vijay; Nagashekhar
- Cinematography: Dasari Seenu
- Edited by: Lakshmana Reddy
- Music by: Sadhu Kokila
- Release date: January 12, 2007
- Country: India
- Language: Kannada

Ee Rajeev Gandhi Alla (transl. This Rajeev is not Gandhi) is a 2007 Indian Kannada-language action drama film directed by Ravi Srivatsa and starring Vijay Raghavendra in the titular role, Rakshitha, Vijay and Nagashekhar with Harish Roy as the antagonist. The film was released after a five-year delay.

== Plot ==
Encounter specialists Rajeev, Shravya, Bikku, Musa and Vivek Acharya, dubbed as the Panchapandavas, are after gangster Samson and his brother Bachchan, who are in Singapore and controlling the Bangalore underworld.

== Cast ==
- Vijay Raghavendra as Rajeev
- Rakshitha as Shravya
- Vijay as Bikku
- Harish Roy as Samson
- Nagashekhar as Musa
- Kote Prabhakar
- Ananthavelu
- Shobaraj
- Sathyajith
- Pavitra Lokesh
- Chitra Shenoy
- Girija Lokesh
- Shivadhwaj
- Mandeep Roy
- Ravi Belagere
- Adi Lokesh

== Production ==
The film began production in 2002 and is an amalgamation of Kaakha Kaakha (2003) and Ab Tak Chhappan (2004). The film was initially titled Rajeev Gandhi Alla Godse. Tilak was initially considered to play one of the City Crime Branch officers.

== Soundtrack ==
The music was composed by Sadhu Kokila.

- "Maaya Jinke" - Shamitha Malnad
- "Huduga Huduga" - Rajesh Krishnan, Malathi
- "Jana Gana Mana" - Hemanth Kumar
- "Shanthi Deepa" - Sadhu Kokila

== Reception ==
R. G. Vijayasarathy of Rediff.com rated the film one out of five stars and wrote that "First up, a warning: Rajeeva is the cinematic equivalent of being shut up for two hours in a torture chamber" and advised viewers to "Watch the film solely at your own risk".
