= Junglee (2009 film) =

- Directed by: Suri
- Written by: Duniya Soori
- Produced by: Rockline Venkatesh
- Starring: Duniya Vijay; Andritha Ray; Adi Lokesh; Rangayana Raghu
- Cinematography: Satya Hegde
- Edited by: Deepu S. Kumar
- Music by: V. Harikrishna
- Production company: Rockline Entertainments
- Distributed by: Yama Release Group
- Release date: 6 February 2009
- Running time: 143 min
- Country: India
- Language: Kannada

Junglee is a 2009 Indian Kannada language romantic action film directed by Suri and produced by Rockline Venkatesh under Rockline Entertainments. It stars Duniya Vijay in his second collaboration with Suri after Duniya, alongside Aindrita Ray, Rangayana Raghu, Balu Nagendra and Adi Lokesh.

Deepu. S. Kumar won the Karnataka State Film Award for Best Editor (2008–09) for the film.

== Cast ==
- Duniya Vijay as Junglee Prabhakar
- Andritha Ray as Padma
- Rangayana Raghu as Gudde Narasimha
- Balu Nagendra as Krishna
- Adi Lokesh as Vasantha
- Suresh Chandra as Guruswamy
- Megha Bhagavatar
- Sanketh Kashi as Padma's father
- Jaidev Mohan as Jumki
- Naveen
- Shobaraj in a cameo appearance
- Bhaskar Surya
- Anil Kumar
- Raghava Uday
- R. G. Vijayasarathy
- Arasu Maharaj
- Nanjunda as Malli, Guruswamy's rival
- Ravi Santhehaklu
- Manjunath S. T.
- Lalithamma
- Vikram Mor
- Vinod
- Chinnayya
- Yathiraj as a police constable
- Rachana Mourya - cameo appearance in the song "Ee Majavada Moggu"

== Soundtrack ==
Track #	Song	Singer(s)	Lyricist
1	"Hale Paatre"	Kailash Kher, Sowmya Raoh	Yograj Bhat
2	"Neenendare"	Sonu Nigam	Jayant Kaikini
3	"Ee Majavada"	Suma Shastry	Yogaraj Bhat
4	"O Nalmeya"	M. D. Pallavi Arun	Jayanth Kaikini
5	"Junglee Shivalingu"	Tippu, Anuradha Bhat, Rangayana Raghu, Chorus	Yograj Bhat
6	"Thale BaachkoLo"	Vijay, Rangayana Raghu (backing)	Yograj Bhat

== Reception ==
=== Critical response ===
R. G. Vijayasarathy of Rediff gave the film 2/5 stars and wrote "All in all, Junglee is an ordinary film from Soori's stable." Sify wrote that "Action lovers will not be disappointed." Bangalore Mirror wrote "Overall the film is a freak of Sandalwood that will give the audience at least a headache." The Times of India gave the film two-and-a-half stars out of five and wrote "In his enthusiasm to give another Duniya-like hit, Suri has faltered in selecting a good story, narration and failed to understand the pulse of the audience by imposing what he wants on them".
