= Dana Kayonu =

- Theatrical release poster
- Directed by: Yogaraj Bhat
- Written by: Yogaraj Bhat
- Produced by: Kanakapura Srinivas; Srikanth
- Starring: Duniya Vijay; Priyamani
- Cinematography: Sugnaan
- Edited by: Deepu S. Kumar
- Music by: V. Harikrishna
- Production company: R. S. Productions
- Distributed by: Jayanna Films
- Release date: 7 October 2016
- Running time: 135 minutes
- Country: India
- Language: Kannada

Dana Kayonu (transl. Cowherd) is a 2016 Indian Kannada romantic comedy film written and directed by Yogaraj Bhat. The film stars Duniya Vijay and Priyamani. The film's music is scored by V. Harikrishna and the cinematography is by Sugnan. The film was released on 7 October 2016 clashing with Prakash Raj's directorial Idolle Ramayana, which also featured Priyamani in the lead role.

== Cast ==
- Duniya Vijay as Kempu aka Docomo
- Priyamani as Jummi
- Rangayana Raghu as Subsidy
- Suchendra Prasad
- Vijanath Biradar as Krishnappa
- Mahesh
- Yogi
- Veena Sundar
- Jahangir
- Nataša Stanković as an item number

== Production ==
The official launch of the film took place at Rajajinagar, Bengaluru on 9 June 2015. Celebrity actors such as Shivarajkumar and V. Ravichandran were present during the launch. However, the very next day of the launch, the film met with trouble for its title. As reported, a particular community members objected for the title and termed it as an offense to their religion.

== Soundtrack ==
Dana Kayonu

Soundtrack album by V. Harikrishna
- Released: 6 May 2016
- Recorded: 2015
- Genre: Feature film soundtrack
- Length: 19:40
- Language: Kannada
- Label: D Beats Music World

The film's soundtrack and original score is composed by V. Harikrishna for which the lyrics is penned by Yogaraj Bhat. The audio released officially at Kanakapura in presence of Karnataka Power Minister, D. K. Shivakumar.

=== Track listing ===
All lyrics are written by Yogaraj Bhat.

| No. | Title | Singer(s) | Length |
|---|---|---|---|
| 1. | "Paper Leak" | Duniya Vijay, Chetan Sosca, Yogaraj Bhat | 2:33 |
| 2. | "Baare Gange" | Kailash Kher | 3:53 |
| 3. | "Nandu Nindu Yavaga" | Vijay Prakash | 4:28 |
| 4. | "Paisa Illade" | V. Harikrishna | 4:24 |
| 5. | "Haalu Kudida Makkale" | Sharan | 4:22 |
| Total length: | | | 19:40 |

== Reception ==
A critic from The New Indian Express wrote that "While the film’s first half mostly captures love between the hero and the heroine and also between the bull and cow, the second half strikes an emotional chord. Yogaraj Bhat has brought the man-animal camaraderie that only endears Dana Kayonu to us".
