= Anjadiru =

- Directed by: R. Janardhan
- Based on: Anjathe by Mysskin
- Produced by: K Muralidhar
- Starring: Prashanth; Shubha Poonja
- Cinematography: Sundarnath Suvarna
- Edited by: K M Prakash
- Music by: Sundar C. Babu
- Release date: March 11, 2009
- Country: India
- Language: Kannada

Anjadiru (transl. Don't fear) is a 2009 Indian Kannada-language action thriller film directed by R. Janardhan and starring Prashanth and Muralidhar. It is a remake of the 2008 Tamil-language film Anjathe.

== Cast ==
- Prashanth as Satyamurthy
- Muralidhar as Krupakara
- Shubha Poonja
- Suman Ranganathan
- Adi Lokesh as Daya
- Dwarakish as Loki
- Avinash
- Ravi Kale as Keerthi
- Srinivasa Murthy
- Padmaja Rao

== Reception ==
A critic from The Times of India wrote that "A meaningless first half and a brilliant second half with a good script and excellent narration mark the second venture of director Janardhan". A critic from Bangalore Mirror wrote that "Anjadiru stands out for its believable characterisation without much of the heroism we seen in most films. But what slows the film at times is Prashant and Muralidhar's incapability to shoulder the scenes effectively. Try Anjadiru if you are bored of the regular stuff but do not expect a miracle". R. G. Vijayasarathy of Rediff.com wrote that "Anjadhiru maybe a remake, but it a well-made one. For those who have not seen the original, it is a great engrossing entertainer".
