= Devru =

- Directed by: Sadhu Kokila
- Based on: Abhimanyu (1991) by Priyadarshan
- Produced by: Rockline Venkatesh
- Starring: Duniya Vijay; Pragna
- Cinematography: J G Krishna
- Edited by: Jo Ni Harsha
- Music by: Sadhu Kokila
- Release date: 20 September 2009
- Country: India
- Language: Kannada

Devru is a 2009 Indian Kannada-language film directed by Sadhu Kokila, starring Duniya Vijay and Pragna in lead roles. The film is a remake of the Malayalam film Abhimanyu (1991).

== Cast ==
- Duniya Vijay as Devru
- Pragna as Divya
- Ashish Vidyarthi as Dhanush
- Ravi Kale as Ram Reddy
- Rockline Venkatesh
- Shobaraj
- P. N. Sathya as Aadi
- Sadhu Kokila
- Yathiraj
- Shille Manjunath

== Music ==
Devru

Soundtrack album by Sadhu Kokila
- Released: 2009
- Recorded: 2009
- Genre: Feature film soundtrack
- Length: 19:04
- Language: Kannada

Official audio
- Devru - Full Album on YouTube

Track listing
No.	Title	Singer(s)	Length
1.	"Baaro Baaro Baa"	Malgudi Subha, Duniya Vijay, Sadhu Kokila	5:12
2.	"Hallo Hallo"	Tippu, Priya	4:28
3.	"Doora Swalpa Doora"	Shreya Ghoshal	5:05
4.	"Mummy Mummy"	Megha	4:59
Total length:			19:04

== Reception ==
=== Critical response ===
The Times of India scored the film at 2.5 out of 5 stars and says "Vijay is simply superb, especially in action sequences, which are his forte. Pragna excels in the climax and has the potential to be a star. Ravikale, Ashish Vidyarthi, Shobhraj and Yathiraj do justice to their roles. Camerawork by J G Krishna is good. Thushar Ranganath has penned some catchy dialogues. The music is okay, but the comedy sequences are average". R G Vijayasarathy of Rediff.com scored the film at 2 out of 5 stars and says "Surprisingly Sadhu's music comes as a dampener. J G Krishna scores well in his camera work. Like many other remakes, Devaru follows the original and ends up as an ordinary fare". The New Indian Express wrote "Devru and makes his life miserable. You have to watch the film to know if Devru wins his battle against Ram Reddy and his henchmen, including the ACP. Some of the songs, especially the item song, are mainly meant for the front benchers. Dialogues are powerful and punchy". BSS of Deccan Herald wrote "True, there is Vijay, all-rounder in acting, dancing and fighting. There is Sadhu himself, whose raised eyebrow is enough to bring out a giggle. There are Ravi Kale, Ashish Vidyarthi and Shobhraj. But none of their characters settles with the viewers, with Sadhu running a swift race, all the while ignoring bystanders substance, cohesion and credibility".Sify Wrote "Director Sadhu Kokila also a music director and comedy actor falls below average in his three responsibilities. None of the songs are worth hearing again. JG Krishna does a good job with the camera".
