= Poojari =

- Directed by: Sharan
- Written by: Keshav Adhithya (dialogues)
- Screenplay by: Sharan
- Story by: Sharan
- Produced by: Mohan Kumar; Mallikarjun; Sharan
- Starring: Adi Lokesh; Neethashree
- Cinematography: S. Chandrashekar
- Edited by: Baby Nagaraj
- Music by: Abhimann Roy
- Production company: Friends Movies
- Release date: January 24, 2007
- Country: India
- Language: Kannada

Poojari (transl. Priest) is a 2007 Indian Kannada-language action drama film directed by Sharan and starring Adi Lokesh (in his lead debut) and Neethashree.

== Cast ==
- Adi Lokesh as Poojari
- Neethashree as Priya
- Rangayana Raghu
- Shobaraj
- Ramesh Bhat
- Avinash
- Tulasi
- Chitra Shenoy
- Prathap

== Production ==
Adi Lokesh previously starred in Jogi (2005) and made his lead debut with this film. Director Sharan did not let Adi Lokesh dub for himself. The song "Kannale Nanna Chitra Baredanu" was shot in Bangkok.

== Soundtrack ==
The music was composed by Abhimann Roy, and the lyrics were written by Sharan Kumar Kabbur, Kantharaj S, Prashanth and Srinivas. The songs became popular.

Track listing
No.	Title	Singer(s)	Length
1.	"Akka Pakka"	Abhimann Roy, Chaitra H. G.	3:58
2.	"Ilibyada Maga"	S. P. Balasubrahmanyam, Badri Prasad	4:59
3.	"Janma Kotta Thayi"	Vijay Kumar	4:11
4.	"Kannalle"	Divya Raghavan, Chaitra H. G.	5:04
5.	"Kannalle (instrumental)"	—	5:02
6.	"Kele Thangaali"	Abhimann Roy	5:04
7.	"Muddu Muddaada"	Udit Narayan, H. Divya	5:01
8.	"Poojaari"	Abhimann Roy, Inchara, H. Divya, Kantha	4:21
Total length:			37:40

== Reception ==
A critic from Chitraloka.com rated the film two out of five stars and wrote that "The film is mass oriented and it attracted the mass audience. [...] Neeta looks glamorous in the song sequences". The film was a box office failure. After the film's failure, Adi Lokesh decided to concentrate back on villain roles.
