= Pendyala =

Pendyala or Pendyal (Telugu: పెండ్యాల) is a Telugu surname. Notable people with the surname include:

- Pendyala Harikrishna (born 1986), Indian chess grandmaster
- Pendyala Nageswara Rao (1917–1984), Indian composer
- Pendyal Raghava Rao (1917–1987), Indian politician
