= Thaakath =

- Directed by: M S Ramesh
- Produced by: B V Pramod
- Starring: Duniya Vijay; Shubha Poonja
- Cinematography: Dasari Srinivas Rao
- Edited by: S Manohar
- Music by: Gurukiran
- Release date: 22 May 2009
- Country: India
- Language: Kannada

Thaakath (transl. Power) is a 2009 Indian Kannada-language film directed by M S Ramesh, starring Duniya Vijay and Shubha Poonja.

== Cast ==
- Duniya Vijay as Basiya
- Shubha Poonja as Bhagya
- Sathyajith
- Sanketh Kashi
- Avinash
- Rangayana Raghu as Singarappa
- Shobaraj
- Veena Sundar
- Malathi Sardeshpande
- Padma Vasanthi

== Music ==
Thaakath

Soundtrack album by Gurukiran
- Released: 2009
- Recorded: 2009
- Genre: Feature film soundtrack
- Length: 23:56
- Language: Kannada

Official audio
- Thaakath – Full Album on YouTube

Track listing
No.	Title	Singer(s)	Length
1.	"Kannambadi Kannambadi"	Bombay Jayashri, Vasu Dixit	4:30
2.	"Mara Mara Jo Kumara"	Apoorva, Gurukiran	4:42
3.	"Raiya Rai Rai Raiya"	Gurukiran, Vasu Dixit	5:38
4.	"Doresani Neenu"	Kunal Ganjawala	5:24
5.	"Alele Savari"	Picchalli Srinivas	4:22
Total length:			23:56

== Reception ==
R G Vijayasarathy of Rediff.com scored the film at 1 out of 5 stars and says "Vijay's performance in Taakat is nothing to write home about though he excels in the action sequences. Shubha Poonja's characterisation is weak and except for Avinash's performance, there's nothing much to say here. Even veterans like Rangayana Raghu, Shobharaj, Sathyajit and Sanketh Kashi fail to impress. Surprisingly even music director Guru Kiran has come out with weak numbers. The camera work too is ordinary". A critic from The New Indian Express wrote "Mandya Ramesh, as a hijra, has also acted well. Music director Gurukiran has composed lilting music for two songs Bhagavantha Syaana and Kannambaadiya. Thakath is worth watching if you are an action-movie buff". A critic from The Times of India scored the film at 3 out of 5 stars and says "Vijay is brilliant and excels in action sequences. Shubha Punja is impressive. Avinash, Kashi, Sathyajit, Rangayana Raghu, Shobhraj excel. Mandya Ramesh is simply superb. Gurukiran's music and Dasara Seenu's camerawork are good". A critic from Bangalore Mirror wrote "Raiyya Rai, with an assortment of voices is a joyful ride! The only track that doesn’t work is the supposedly sensuous Maare maara – ends up being funny, instead. Thaakath has Gurukiran in inspired form!"
