= Veeru =

- Directed by: S. Narayan
- Written by: S. Narayan
- Produced by: S. Narayan; B. N. Vidyashree
- Starring: Pankaj; Umashree; Prakash Heggodu
- Cinematography: P. K. H. Das
- Edited by: P R Sounder Rajan
- Music by: S. Narayan
- Production company: Vidyadhare Combines (P) Ltd
- Release date: 27 January 2006
- Country: India
- Language: Kannada

Veeru is a 2006 Indian Kannada-language drama film written, co-produced, and directed by S. Narayan and starring Pankaj in the titular role, Umashree, and Prakash Heggodu.

== Cast ==
- Umashree as Paru
- Pankaj as Veeru
- Prakash Heggodu as Mullayya
- Asharani as Rachavva
- Hamsaraj S. Gowda as Pathi

== Production ==
The story of Veeru was two years old and was revised in three months during late 2005. The film marked the debut of Pankaj, the son of S. Narayan. He shot for the film while studying 8th standard and shot during his holidays. The Kannada spoken during the Old Mysore was used in the film. Except Umashree and Asharani, all of the actors are debutantes.

== Soundtrack ==
The music was composed and written by S. Narayan.

Track listing
No.	Title	Singer(s)	Length
1.	"Baaro Ninga"	Vinaya, Vasudha	3:58
2.	"Chandani Chandani"	Ramesh Chandra	2:54
3.	"Hetthavala Kanneeru"	C. Ashwath	4:02
4.	"Hrudayave"	J. Anoop Seelin	6:44
5.	"Naa Ede Thumbi Haadide"	Hemanth	5:06
6.	"O Gulabi"	Ajay Warriar	3:57
7.	"Ello Jogappa"	J. Anoop Seelin	4:57
Total length:			31:38

== Reception ==
A critic from Sify wrote, "The issues of poverty, slavery, corruption in government schools and depriving children from going to school etc- all this form the crux of the film. All the incidents follow one by one with no relief to the audience". A critic from Chitraloka.com wrote, "Director of repute S. Narayan has deviated from his commercial films and shows how strong he is when he takes up causes of the society".
