= Odahuttidavalu =

- Directed by: Om Sai Prakash
- Story by: Cheran
- Produced by: K. Manju
- Starring: V. Ravichandran; Rakshita; Radhika
- Cinematography: G. S. V. Seetharam
- Edited by: Muni
- Music by: R. P. Patnaik
- Production company: Lakshmishree Combines
- Release date: 1 September 2006
- Running time: 154 minutes
- Country: India
- Language: Kannada

Odahuttidavalu is a 2006 Indian Kannada-language drama film directed by Sai Prakash and produced by K. Manju. The film stars V. Ravichandran, Rakshita and Radhika in the leading roles.

The film was a remake of Tamil film Porkkaalam (1997) directed by Cheran. The film received mixed reviews.

== Cast ==
- Ravichandran
- Rakshita
- Radhika
- Mallika
- Komal Kumar
- Adi Lokesh

== Soundtrack ==
The music is composed by R. P. Patnaik. Lyrics were written by Gururaj Hoskote, Kaviraj and K. Kalyan. The song "Thanjavooru Mannu" from the original film has been retained here as "Mandyadinda Mannu". The song "En Chandavo" is adapted from Patnaik's own song "Nanna Kattukuro" from Family Circus.

Track listing
No.	Title	Singer(s)	Length
1.	"Maathu Belli Kane"	S. P. Balasubrahmanyam
2.	"Mandyadinda Mannu Thandu"	Mano
3.	"Baaro Baaro Maava"	Rajesh Krishnan, K. S. Chithra
4.	"En Chandavo"	Karthik, Sunitha
5.	"Thangi Naguthaale"	S. P. Balasubrahmanyam
6.	"Oda Huttidavalu"	R. P. Patnaik

== Reception ==
Film critic R. G. Vijayasarathy of IANS wrote that "'Odahuttidavalu' makes a poor comparison with the original 'Porkaalam', but still is a good film for a one time watch because of Ravichandran and Mallika". A critic from Chitraloka.com wrote that "Odahuttidavalu will certainly appeal to the Crazy Star’s fans and the female audience who want to see such sentimental films again and again".
