= Nanditha (singer) =

Indian playback singer

Nanditha Rakesh
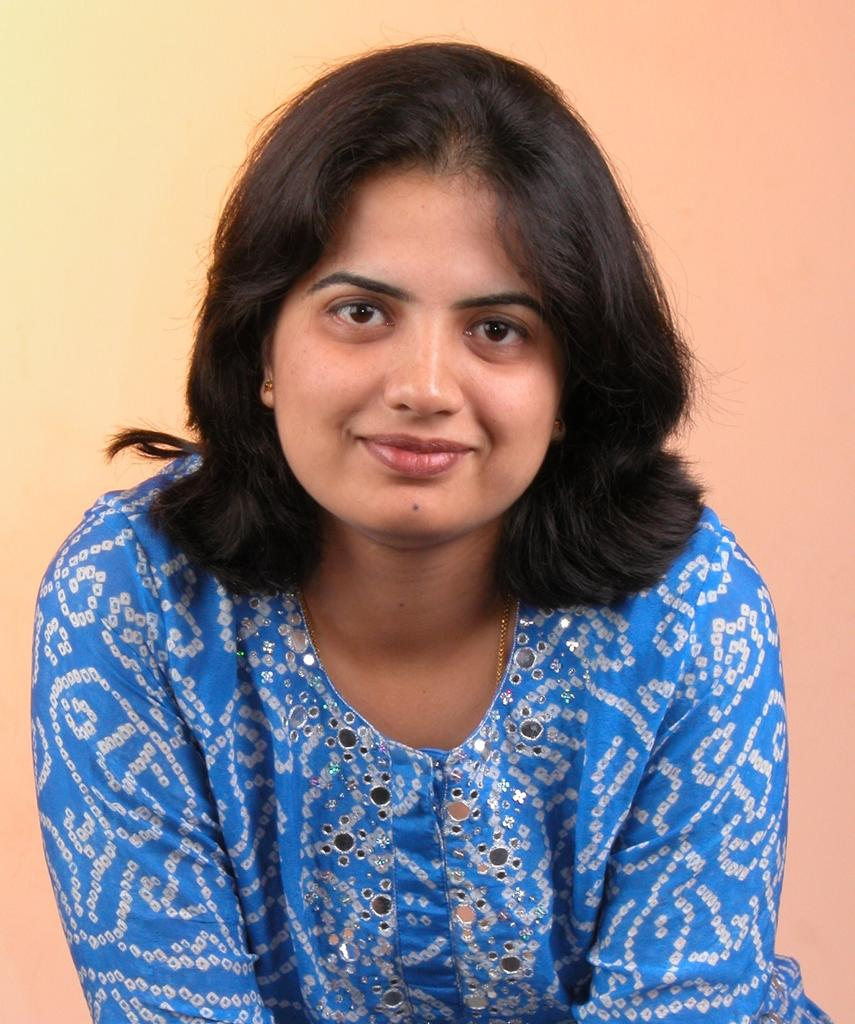

Background information
- Born: 28 February 1978 (age 48)
- Origin: Channarayapatna taluk, Hassan district, Karnataka, India
- Genres: Filmi, Carnatic Music, Sugama Sangeetha
- Occupation: Singer
- Instruments: Vocals, Veena
- Years active: 1998–present

Nanditha (born 28 February) is an Indian singer. Best known as a playback singer in the Kannada film industry, she sings in other languages such as Tamil and Telugu. Nanditha began her playback career from the film Habba (1998). Since then, she has won numerous awards including the Karnataka State Film Awards and Filmfare Awards South for her singing.

== Early life ==
Nanditha obtained a bachelor of engineering degree from R.V. College of Engineering, Bangalore. She worked as a software engineer for Cisco systems for some time. She left the job and got involved fully into music. Nanditha is also a trained veena player, secured a scholarship from Centre for Cultural Resources and Training, New Delhi, and trained under R. K. Suryanarayan. Her musical career started as a track singer for music director Hamsalekha. He gave her the first break in his film Habba in 1998.

== Career ==
Nanditha has worked with many composers including Ilayaraja, Mano Murthy, Hamsalekha, V. Manohar, Rajesh Ramanath and others. She has won the Karnataka state award four times which includes for three consecutive times and she is the only singer so far from Karnataka to achieve that. She has established herself as a dubbing artist too. She has dubbed for hit films like Nanna Preethiya Hudugi (for Deepa), Paris Pranaya (for Minal patel). She has won filmfare award for best female singer for the song Kariya I love you from Duniya. She has performed all over India, Singapore, USA, Muscat etc. as a professional singer and a Veena artist. To date, she has sung in more than 500 movies in Kannada, Telugu, Tamil, and Malayalam, which add up to over 2000 movie songs. She has also sung over 5000 devotional, folk, sugam Sangeetha songs in over 9 languages.

== Notable songs ==
Some of her songs are

- "Moda Modalu" (Yeshwant)
- "Akka" (Kallarali Hoovagi)
- "Sihi Gali" (Aa Dinagalu)
- "Kariya I Love You" (Duniya)
- "Hoo Kanasa Jokali" (Inthi Ninna Preethiya)
- "Baara Sanihake Baara" (Apthamitra)
- "Habba Habba" (Habba)
- "Idu Modalane Haadu" (Mathadana)
- "O Missamma" (Yuvaraja)
- "Oh Kencha " (Kalasipalya)
- "O Hrudaya" (Shastri)
- "Preethisu Ba" (Daasa)
- "Yaaro" (Orata I Love You)
- "Neenendare Nanage Ishta Kano" (Raam)
- "Neenu Banda Mele" (Krishna)
- "Akashakke Obba" (Jogula)
- "Yede Tumbi" (Paris Pranaya)

== Awards ==
Karnataka State Film Awards

- 2002: Best Female Playback Singer for "Bili Bannada Gini" from Gandhada Gombe
- 2003: Best Female Playback Singer for "Ede Tumbi Hadidenu" from Paris Pranaya
- 2004: Best Female Playback Singer for "Aakashake Obba" from Jogula
- 2009: Best Female Playback Singer for "Baanige Bhaskara Chanda" from Mandakini

Filmfare Awards South

- 2007: Best Female Playback Singer – Kannada for "Kariya I Love You" from Duniya
- 2009: Best Female Playback Singer – Kannada for "Neenendare" from Raam

Udaya Film Awards

- 2007: Best Female Playback Singer for "Kariya I Love You" from Duniya

Suvarna Film Awards

- 2007: Best Female Playback Singer for "Kariya I Love You" from Duniya

Other awards

- 2008: Favorite Singer at SFM Kalaa Awards
