= Chanda (2007 film) =

- DVD cover
- Directed by: S. Narayan
- Written by: S. Narayan
- Produced by: S. Narayan
- Starring: Duniya Vijay; Shubha Punja
- Cinematography: Jagdish Vaali
- Edited by: Soundar Rajan
- Music by: S. Narayan
- Release date: 16 November 2007
- Country: India
- Language: Kannada

Chanda is a 2007 Kannada-language film directed by S. Narayan, produced by Smt. Bhagyavathi and starred Duniya Vijay and Shubha Punja. The film was in the news when Duniya Vijay decided not to dub for the film. The film was a box office success.

== Cast ==
- Duniya Vijay as Kariya
- Shubha Poonja as Swapna
- Sundar Raj
- Komal
- Master Rakesh
- Somanna Jaadar
- Shobha Raghavendra

== Soundtrack ==
All lyrics are written by S. Narayan.

Track listing
No.	Title	Singer(s)	Length
1.	"Savi Savi"	Shaan, K. S. Chithra	5:01
2.	"Nee Chandane"	Kumar Sanu, Shreya Ghoshal	4:50
3.	"Hogu Manase"	K. S. Chithra, S. Narayan	3:37
4.	"Hogonammi"	Karthik, K. S. Chithra	5:03
5.	"Yenaitho Nangenayaitho"	Kunal Ganjawala, Shreya Ghoshal	4:57
6.	"Hogu Manase"	Madhu Balakrishnan, S. Narayan	5:56
7.	"Gundene Dyavru"	L. N. Shastri, S. Narayan	7:45

== Release ==
Sify gave a positive review. A critic from Rediff.com wrote that "Chanda is definitely an above average film".
