= Duniya Vijay =

Indian actor (born 1974)

Vijaya Kumar
- Duniya Vijay in 2021
- Born: B. Rudrappa Vijay Kumar; 20 January 1974 (age 52); Kumbaranahalli, Karnataka, India
- Occupations: Actor; film director
- Years active: 2004–present
- Spouse: Nagarathna (m. 1999)
- Partner: Keerthi Pattadi
- Children: 3
- Relatives: Yogesh (nephew)

B. Rudrappa Vijay Kumar, professionally known as Duniya Vijay and Kariya Vijay Sagar,is an Indian actor and film director known for his work in Kannada films. As an actor, he began his career playing small roles until he got his big break in Duniya (2007) for which he won his first Filmfare Award for Best Actor. He is the recipient of two Filmfare Awards, one Karnataka State Film Award and SIIMA Award.

He is noted for his performances in Chanda (2007), Junglee (2009), Johny Mera Naam Preethi Mera Kaam (2011), Jayammana Maga (2013), Maasthi Gudi (2017), Salaga (2021), and Bheema (2024).

== Career ==
Vijay began his career in films with a role in Yograj Bhat's Ranga SSLC with Sudeep. He then appeared in Monalisa, Jogi, Shree and Ee Rajeev Gandhi Alla, and also accepted roles in television.

The turning point in Vijay's career came with his friend Soori's directorial debut Duniya. Vijay was cast as a kind, naive village boy who falls into the hands of underworld goons who use him as a henchman. His acting won him positive reviews from critics. Vijay went on to win the State and Filmfare awards for his role in the film.

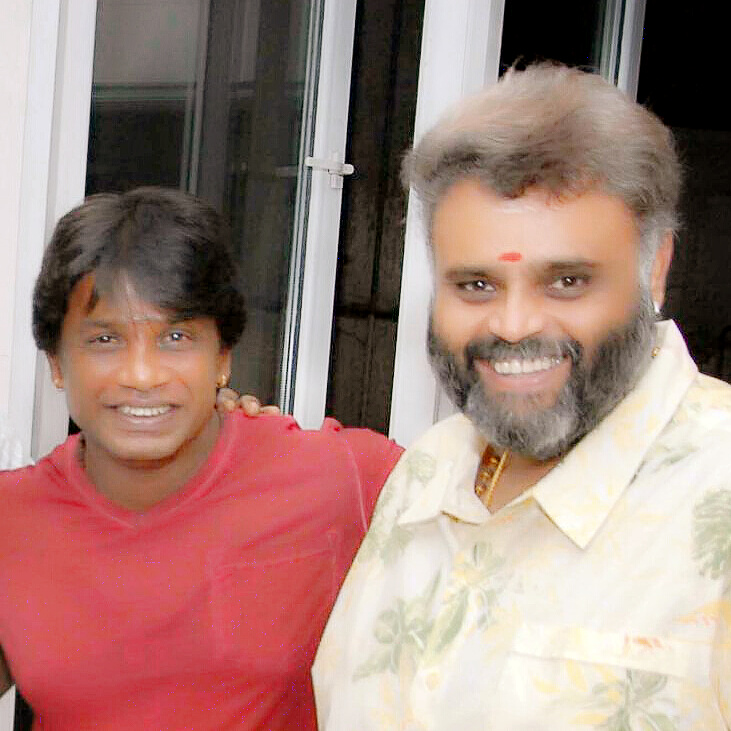
Vijay, film director Ravi Srivatsa (right)

In 2007, Vijay appeared in Yuga, Chanda and Geleya. Yuga is an action-oriented film that is similar to Duniya but it was not a box-office success. Vijay took a supporting role in Geleya when Prakash Rai suddenly left the film.

In Chanda, which was directed by S. Narayan, who had supposedly agreed with Vijay to release the film six weeks after Yuga to avoid a clash. Narayan did not keep this promise, for which Vijay refused to dub for the film. The matter was settled with the Karnataka Film Chamber of Commerce (KFCC), which imposed a year-long ban on Vijay. After the intervention of KFCC elders, the ban was revoked and Vijay was eligible to work on other movies. Chanda was a commercial success at the box office, and especially at B&C centres.

Vijay did a semi-art film Avva for Kavita Lankesh at the start of 2008. Vijay won accolades for a bravura performance, but the film did not do well. He was then seen in Sumana Kittur's Slum Bala towards the end of 2008, which also did average business. The consensus was that both films lacked action, which was Vijay's forte.

In 2009, Vijay appeared in action-oriented films, such as MR Ramesh's Thaakath and Junglee, which was directed by Soori, and Sadhu Kokila's Devru. Vijar appeared in three films in 2010, one of which, Kanteerava, had average business and reviews. The other two, Shankar IPS and Kari Chirathe, were box-office failures. The following year, he appeared in successful and critically acclaimed films Jarasandha, Johny Mera Naam Preethi Mera Kaam and Veerabahu.

In 2012, Vijay starred in the critically acclaimed Bheema Theeradalli which also had commercial success. Vijay was lauded for his performance in the movie. In early 2013, the film Rajanikantha was released and it was a disaster at the box office. His subsequent release Jayammana Maga, a psychological thriller and his first production venture under his company "Duniya Talkies", attracted positive critical reviews and his performance was noted. He did his own stunts in this movie like in many of his other films, including Duniya. His next movie Shivajinagara was an average box-office performer. In 2014, his only movie was Simhadri. In 2015, he appeared in Jackson, Rx Suri, and Ring Road, which were hits, but Cobra was delayed.

In 2016, Vijay's first release was Yogaraj Bhat's much-hyped film Dana Kayonu, in which he starred alongside Priyamani. The film was a commercial success and resurrected his career. His next release was Nagashekar's Masti Gudi, which made little impact at the box office.

The film Kanaka was released after Masti Gudi. After the film's success he appeared in Johnny Johnny Yes Papa (2018), a sequel to their previous venture Johny Mera Naam Preethi Mera Kaam (2011) that was produced under Vijay's company Duniya Talkies.

In 2021, Vijay appeared in the adult-oriented film Kusti with his son Samrat, and his own directorial debut Salaga. He then wrote, directed and starred in Bheema (2024). He plays the eponymous role in the film dealing with drug menace. Although his performance was commended, critics wrote unfavourably of the film's screenplay.

In 2026, it was reported that he would direct City Lights, starring Vinay Rajkumar and his daughter, Monisha, in her debut.

== Personal life ==
Vijay was born to the couple of Narayanamma and Rudrappa. His father Rudrappa died in 2021, aged 81.

Vijay was first married to Nagarathna. The couple have three children: daughters Monisha and Monica, and son Samrat. All of them have worked in Kannada films as actors.

Vijay filed for divorce first in January 2013 accusing her parents and her of cruelty, and desertion. However, the couple patched up in November 2014. Vijay met Keerthi Pattadi, an IT professional and model, in 2010. They married in 2016, before obtaining a divorce from Nagarathna. Vijay again filed for divorce from Nagarathna in 2018 accusing her of cruelty, and it was reported that the petition was dismissed in 2024, despite him being reported to have agreed to pay alimony to her.

== Controversies ==
On 6 November 2016, while filming the climax fight scene for Masti Gudi, two stuntmen playing the villains Anil and Uday, along with Vijay, jumped from a helicopter into Thippagondanahalli Reservoir. While the two stuntmen drowned, Vijay was rescued by the film crew. Following this incident, the KFCC imposed a ban on Vijay, director Nagashekar and stunt choreographer Ravi Varma until further notice. In April 2017, police filed criminal charges against several members of the production crew but did not file charges against Vijay.

On 24 September 2018, Vijay was arrested after he was alleged to have assaulted and abducted his friend, a gym trainer.

== Filmography ==
Key
†	Denotes films that have not yet been released

Year	Film	Role	Notes
2004	Ranga SSLC	Kariya	Uncredited role
2004	Monalisa	Dhyan's classmate	
2005	Rishi	Drug peddler	
2005	Rakshasa	Thambi Palani	
2005	Giri	Henchman	
2005	Mental Manja	Angry man	
2005	Jogi	Prisoner	
2005	Deadly Soma	Narayana	
2006	Shree	Shetty's henchman	
2006	Ambi	Ambi's friend	
2006	Kallarali Hoovagi	Bedara Paapu	
2007	Ee Rajeev Gandhi Alla	Bikku	
2007	Duniya	Shivalinga a.k.a. Shivu	Filmfare Award for Best Actor – Kannada; Karnataka State Film Award for Best Actor
2007	Sri Kshethra Kaivara Thathayya	Villager	Cameo
2007	Guna		Cameo
2007	Yuga	Yuga	
2007	Geleya	Vijay	Special Appearance
2007	Chanda	Kariya	
2008	Avva	Bedara Manja	
2008	Slum Bala	Bala	
2009	Junglee	Prabhakar	
2009	Thaakath	Basya	
2009	Devru	Devru	Also playback singer
2010	Shankar IPS	Shankar Prasad	
2010	Kari Chirathe	Madesh	
2010	Kanteerava	Kanteerava	
2010	Aithalakkadi	Himself	Guest appearance
2011	Veera Bahu	Veerabahu	
2011	Johny Mera Naam Preethi Mera Kaam	Johnny	
2011	Jarasandha	Krishna Murthy "Jarasandha"	
2012	Bheema Theeradalli	Chandya	Suvarna Critics Award for Actor
2012	Rajanikantha	Rajani and Kantha	Dual Role
2013	Jayammana Maga	Naga	Also story writer and producer
2013	Kariya Kan Bitta		Cameo
2014	Shivajinagara	Ramu	
2014	Simhadri	Simhadri	
2015	Jackson	Jackson	
2015	Daksha	Daksha	
2015	RX Soori	Soori	
2015	Ring Road	Khan	
2016	Dana Kayonu	Kempu / Docomo	
2017	Masti Gudi	Maasthi	
2018	Kanaka	Kanaka	
2018	Johnny Johnny Yes Papa	Johnny	
2021	Salaga	Vijay	Also director and writer; Filmfare Award for Best Director – Kannada
2023	Veera Simha Reddy	Musali Madugu Pratap Reddy	Telugu film; SIIMA Award for Best Actor in a Negative Role – Telugu
2024	Kotee	Kotee's father	Cameo appearance
2024	Bheema	Bheema and Salaga	Dual role, Also director and writer
2025	Marutha	Anish Patil	Extended cameo appearance
2026	Landlord	Rachayya	
2026	City Lights	—N/a	Director
2026	Mookuthi Amman 2	Ranadheeran / Rudhra	Dual role; Tamil film

=== Television ===
Year	Title	Role	Network	Ref.
2000–2005	Papa Pandu	Thief	ETV Kannada	
