= Shubha Poonja =

Indian actress and former model

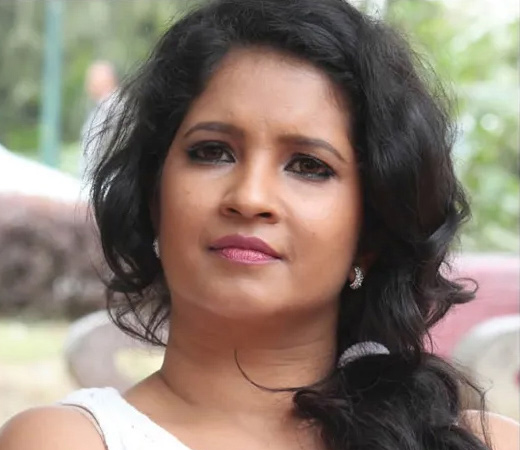
- Shubha Poonja
- Born: Bangalore, Karnataka, India
- Occupations: Actress, model
- Years active: 2004–present

Shubha Poonja is an Indian actress and former model, who has mostly appeared in Kannada films. She is best known for essaying the leading role alongside Radhika Pandit in the movie Moggina Manasu for which she received Filmfare Award for Best Supporting Actress – Kannada.

Shubha started her career in 2003-04 and has completed 2 decades (20 years) in the film industry working in nearly 50 movies. She established herself as one of the leading actresses in Kannada Cinema from 2008 to 2012. She still remains one of the most known faces with her regular appearances on T.V. shows and now with her YouTube channel.

== Career ==
Shubha Poonja is of Mangalorean descent from the Tuluva community. She was raised in Bangalore and studied in Carmel Convent School, Jayanagar, Bangalore, before she started modelling, appearing in various television ads.

Meanwhile, she won the "Miss Chennai-Top Model 2003" title. Subsequently, she entered the Tamil film industry, after K. S. Vasanthakumar, director of the Tamil film Machi approached her to enact the lead female role in the film, having seen her photos.

After starring in the Tamil films Thirudiya Idhayathai in the following months, she entered the Kannada film industry with the 2006 film Jackpot. She immediately rose to fame with back to back hits having appeared in several Kannada films, including Chanda, Moggina Manasu which won her a filmfare award and Slum Bala, Thaakath and more.

After becoming a household name, Shubha stuck with similar kind of stereotypical roles and choices that impeded her career. Up until 2016, her films underperformed and with Jai Maruthi 800 becoming a commercial success, she made a positive comeback. She also was one of the mentors and led a team for Super Kabbadi - a sports reality show for women in the Kannada Film Industry.

Following this, she participated in the Kannada reality show, Bigg Boss Kannada (season 8). She was one of the most anticipated celebrities since season 1 to be in the house. Shubha stayed in the house almost till the finale, her glamorous perception took a turn with her becoming fan favourite among kids and women.

After Shubha's stint with Bigg Boss, she married her boyfriend Sumanth and went on a promotional drive for her recently released movies like Naragunda Bandaya, Rhymes and Ambuja. While none of them performed to expectations, her latest film 3Devi is all set to release. This is also Shubha's first movie as a producer and has already made waves across several International Film Festivals worldwide winning many awards. Shubha also stepped in as a guest host for Bigg Boss Kannada season 10 alongside Shine Shetty to conduct the weekend elimination replacing Sudeep while he was sick.

She started her 2025 with a special appearance in Bigg Boss Kannada season 11 to promote and lead the team of Girls in Colors Kannada's new T.V. show - Boys Vs Girls.

== Filmography ==
=== Kannada films ===
List of Shubha Poonja Kannada film credits
Year	Title	Role	Notes
2006	Jackpot	Preethi	
2007	Chanda	Swapna	
2008	Moggina Manasu	Renuka	Filmfare Award for Best Supporting Actress – Kannada
2008	Slum Bala	Malliga	
2009	Anjadiru	Uththara	
2009	Thaakath	Bhagya (Bhageerathi)	
2010	Preethi Hangama	Geetha	
2010	Naari Adda		
2011	Kanteerava	Indra	
2011	Naanalla	Bhavya	
2012	Golmaal	Preethi	
2013	Parari	Urmila	
2014	Chirayu		
2015	Kotigond Love Story		
2016	Tarle Nan Maklu		
2016	Jai Maruthi 800	Smitha	
2016	Sigandur Chowdeshwari Mahime		
2017	Meenakshi	Meenakshi	
2017	Thatan Thithi Mommagan Prastha	Sanjana	
2018	Googal	Nandini	
2018	Kelavu Dinagala Nanthara	Priya	
2018	Raja Loves Radhe	Rukku	
2018	Raambo 2	Herself	Cameo
2019	Jayamahal	Jaya	
2020	Naragunda Bandaya		
2021	Beera	Shuba	
2022	Rhymes		
2023	Ambuja	Nandini	
2024	3Devi	Vijayalakshmi	also associate producer

=== Tamil films ===
List of Shubha Poonja Tamil film credits
Year	Title	Role	Notes
2004	Machi	Rakshita	
2005	Thirudiya Idhayathai	Haritha	
2007	Oru Ponnu Oru Paiyan	Shubha	
2008	Sutta Pazham	Vandana	
