= Adi Lokesh =

Indian actor

- Born: Aditya Lokesh
- Occupation: Actor
- Years active: 2002-present
- Notable work: Jogi (2005)
- Parent: Mysore Lokesh (father)
- Relatives: Pavitra Lokesh (sister)

Adi Lokesh is an Indian actor who works in Kannada films. He is known for his villainous roles such as his role in Jogi (2005) as Bidda.

== Personal life ==
He is the son of actor Mysore Lokesh. His sister is actress Pavitra Lokesh.

== Career ==
Adi Lokesh made his acting debut with Naanu Naane (2002). He made a breakthrough with as a schemer named Bidda in Jogi (2005). After the success of the film, he made his lead debut with Poojari (2007). However, after the film's failure, he did not star in any film for a year. He also played the lead in Bidda (2008) and Gang Leader (2010). During this time, he played negative roles in films such as Arasu (2007) as Meera Jasmine's tormentor and Raaj – The Showman (2009).

In 2014, he participated as a contestant in the second season of Bigg Boss Kannada (2014) airing on Asianet Suvarna.

== Filmography ==
- 2002 - Naanu Naane
- 2005 - Jogi
- 2006 - Mohini 9886788888
- 2006 - Odahuttidavalu
- 2007 - Sixer
- 2007 - Ee Rajeev Gandhi Alla
- 2007 - Poojari
- 2007 - VIP 5
- 2007 - Arasu
- 2008 - Bombaat
- 2008 - Bidda
- 2008 - Kaamannana Makkalu
- 2009 - Junglee
- 2009 - Anjadiru
- 2009 - Nandini Estate
- 2009 - Nishedhanjne
- 2009 - Hatrick Hodi Maga
- 2009 - Raaj – The Showman
- 2009 - Kallara Santhe
- 2009 - Bhagyada Balegara
- 2010 - Huli
- 2010 - Gang Leader
- 2010 - Sri Moksha
- 2011 - Mallikarjuna
- 2011 - Prince
- 2011 - Dhan Dhana Dhan
- 2011 - Kadhimaru
- 2011 - Bete
- 2011 - Vighneshwara
- 2012 - Paper Dhoni
- 2012 - Alemari
- 2012 - Arakshaka
- 2012 - Sagar
- 2013 - Madarangi
- 2013 - Eela (Telugu)
- 2014 - Darling
- 2014 - Power
- 2014 - Youthful Love (Telugu)
- 2014 - Belli
- 2014 - Jai Bajarangabali
- 2015 - Nigraha Dala
- 2015 - Take It Easy
- 2015 - Bhanta
- 2015 - Goolihatti
- 2015 - Vigna
- 2015 - RX Soori
- 2016 - Leela
- 2017 - Dandupalya 2
- 2018 - 8MM Bullet
- 2018 - Dandupalya 3
- 2018 - Ambi Ning Vayassaytho
- 2022 - Garuda
- 2022 - Trivikrama

=== Television ===
Year	Title	Role	Channel	Ref.
2014	Bigg Boss Kannada (season 2)	Contestant	Asianet Suvarna	
2023	Olavina Nildana		Colors Kannada	
