= Duniya (2007 film) =

- VCD cover
- Directed by: Duniya Suri
- Written by: Duniya Suri
- Produced by: T. P. Siddaraju
- Starring: Duniya Vijay; Rashmi; Rangayana Raghu; Yogesh
- Cinematography: Satya Hegde
- Edited by: Deepu S. Kumar
- Music by: Songs: V. Manohar; Score; Sadhu Kokila
- Production company: Samy Associates
- Release date: 23 February 2007
- Running time: 127 minutes
- Country: India
- Language: Kannada

Duniya (transl. World) is a 2007 Indian Kannada-language action drama film directed by Duniya Suri (in his directorial debut) and produced by T. P. Siddaraju under Samy Associates. The film stars Duniya Vijay and Rashmi in their lead debuts, alongside Rangayana Raghu, Kishore and Yogesh.

Duniya was released on 23 February 2007 and became a successful venture at the box office. Due to the film, Vijay and Suri came to be known as Duniya Vijay and Duniya Suri among the masses whilst Yogesh became known by his character's name Loose Maada.

== Plot ==
Shivalinga a.k.a. Shivu, an innocent villager who works as a manual laborer in a stone quarry, learns that his mother is seriously ill. He gets his mother to Bangalore for treatment, but his mother dies and he is unable to arrange finances for her funeral. He manages to pay for his mother's funeral with the only ornament he had. With his inability to procure a tombstone for his mother's grave, Shivu leaves the city walking, without any money, devastated.

While on his way he comes across a girl named Poornima who is kidnapped and the abductors try to rape her. Shivu saves her and gets her to the orphanage where she is staying. The warden of the institute misunderstands the situation and believes that Poornima is in love with Shivu and had eloped with him. The warden asks the girl to leave the institution immediately.

Shivu wants to fulfill Poornima's wish to continue studying and decides to support her education. But apart from a strong body he does not have any qualities to survive in this world. The circumstances make him work for the underworld. In the process his peers in the underworld have an eye on Poornima; his love for Poornima makes Shivu fight with mob leaders. In the process the kingpin is killed. Police wrongly believe that Shivu is responsible for the murders. Unable to see the suffering of Shivu at the hands of society, police, and the underworld, Poornima calls him to meet her outside the city. Without his knowledge, she gives him sweets laced with poison and she too consumes the same to end the chapter.

== Cast ==
- Vijay as Shivalinga a.k.a. Shivu
- Rashmi as Poornima
- Rangayana Raghu as Satyanna
- Kishore as ACP Umesh Kumar
- Mico Nagaraj as Raghupathi
- Yogesh as 'Loose' Maada
- Lokesh as Praveen
- Sai Sunil as Sappe
- Prasanna as Petrol
- Kaddipudi Chandru as Dopu

Uncredited

- Mohan Juneja as the gravedigger
- Sardar Sathya as an auto driver

== Production ==
Over a dozen women auditioned before Rashmi was selected.

== Soundtrack ==
The soundtrack was composed by V. Manohar, while the musical score was composed by Sadhu Kokila. The lyrics were written by V. Nagendra Prasad, V. Manohar and Yograj Bhat.

No.	Title	Lyrics	Singers	Length
1.	"Kariya I Love You"	V. Nagendra Prasad	Rajesh Krishnan, Nanditha	04:44
2.	"Preethi Maaye Hushaaru"	Ranganath	Hemanth Kumar, Aakanksha Baadami	03:39
3.	"Ee Paapi Duniya Preethi"	V. Nagendra Prasad	Badri Prasad	01:52
4.	"Saala Maadiyaadru Tuppa"	V. Manohar	Abhimanyu Bhupathi, Mysore Jenny, Gururaj Hosakote	03:43
5.	"Ee Paapi Janara Haalu"	V. Nagendra Prasad	Badri Prasad	01:56
6.	"Nodayya Kvaate Lingave"	V. Nagendra Prasad	M. D. Pallavi Arun	04:02
7.	"Ennomme Neenu Bandu"	Yograj Bhat	Badri Prasad	02:04

== Reception ==
Chitraloka wrote that "Soori directed “Duniya is a must watch for all section of film fans who wants to see something different and authentic." R. G. Vijayasarathy of Rediff gave 3.5/5 stars and wrote "Soori has used all the commercial elements to make the film appealing to all the sections of the audience. Besides the stark reality in presentation, it is his writing talent that wins the battle for Duniya." In his another review for IANS, R. G. Vijayasarathy gave 3/5 stars and wrote "Duniya is a film that should not be missed as it is a top class presentation. It is strongly recommended for film buffs who want to see different type of films."

=== Box office ===
Duniya was a box office success. The film ran for more than 25 weeks in some centres, thereby becoming a silver jubilee film.

== Accolades ==
Event	Category	Recipient	Ref.
2006–07 Karnataka State Film Awards	Best Actor	Vijay	
2006–07 Karnataka State Film Awards	Best Screenplay	Soori	
2006–07 Karnataka State Film Awards	Best Supporting Actor	Rangayana Raghu	
2006–07 Karnataka State Film Awards	Female Playback Singer	M. D. Pallavi Arun	
55th Filmfare Awards South	Best Actor – Kannada	Vijay	
55th Filmfare Awards South	Best Actress – Kannada	Rashmi	
