= Darshan filmography =

List of Films by Darshan

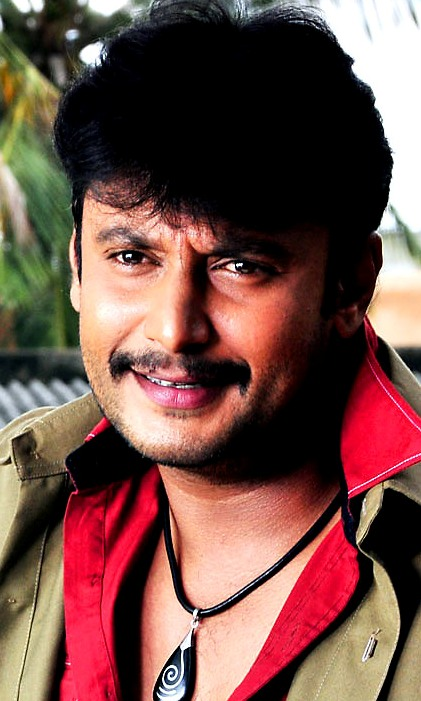
Darshan Thoogudeepa in 2011

Darshan Thoogudeepa is an Indian actor and film producer known for his work in Kannada cinema. He is the son of actor Thoogudeepa Srinivas. Darshan initially worked in trivial roles in few films and television serial's, later made his debut in a lead role in 2002 film, Majestic.

He starred in many commercial and critical hit films such as Kariya (2003), Kalasipalya (2004), Ayya (2005), Suntaragaali (2006), Snehana Preethina (2007), Gaja (2008), Arjun (2008), Yodha (2009), Porki (2010), Saarathi (2011), Chingari (2012), Krantiveera Sangolli Rayanna (2012), Bulbul (2013), Mr. Airavata (2015), Jaggu Dada (2016), Chakravarthy (2017), Tarak (2017), Yajamana (2019), Kurukshetra (2019), Roberrt (2021) and Kaatera (2023).

== Filmography ==
Key
†	Denotes films that have not yet been released

=== As actor ===
Year	Film	Role(s)	Notes	Ref.
1997	Mahabharatha	Babu	Debut film, credited as Thoogudeepa Darshan	
2000	Devara Maga	Darshan		
2000	Vallarasu	Pandian	Tamil film	
2001	Ellara Mane Dosenu	Sharath		
2001	Mr. Harischandra	Gopi		
2002	Bhootayyana Makkalu	Darshan		
2002	Majestic	Prajwal / Daasa	Debut lead role	
2002	Dhruva	Dhruva		
2002	Dil	Himself	Cameo appearance	
2002	Ninagoskara	Manoj		
2002	Kitty	Kitty		
2003	Kariya	Kariya		
2003	Laali Haadu	Puttaswamy / Anand		
2003	Neenandre Ishta	Ajay		
2003	Naana Hendthi Maduve	Himself	Cameo appearance	
2003	Lankesh Patrike	Indra		
2003	Kushalave Kshemave	Darshan	Cameo appearance	
2003	Namma Preethiya Ramu	Ramu		
2003	Daasa	Mohan Das		
2003	Annavru	Surya		
2004	Dharma	Dharma		
2004	Darshan	Darshan		
2004	Monalisa	Himself	Special appearance in the song "Chori Chori"	
2004	Bhagawan	Bhagi		
2004	Kalasipalya	Kencha		
2004	Saradara	Maada		
2005	Ayya	Ayya		
2005	Shastri	Rama Shastri		
2005	Swamy	ACP Swamy		
2006	Mandya	Ganesh / Eshwar		
2006	Suntaragaali	Jaggi		
2006	Dattha	Dattha		
2006	Jothe Jotheyali	Himself	Cameo appearance; also producer	
2006	Thangigagi	Veerabhadra		
2007	Arasu	Vijay	Cameo appearance	
2007	Bhoopathi	Bhoopathi	25th Film as a lead actor	
2007	Snehana Preethina	Surya		
2007	Anatharu	Sathyaprakash		
2007	Ee Bandhana	Kiran		
2008	Gaja	Gaja		
2008	Indra	Rayanna and Indra	Dual role	
2008	Arjun	Arjun		
2008	Navagraha	Jaggu		
2009	Yodha	Captain Ram		
2009	Abhay	Abhay		
2010	Porki	Datthu / Surya		
2010	Shourya	Soorya		
2011	Boss	Ram and Raj	Dual role	
2011	Prince	Raj / Vishnu		
2011	Saarathi	Raja / Krishna	Suvarna Best Hero award TV9 Film Award for Best Actor	
2012	Chingari	Dhanush		
2012	Snehitaru	Surya Prakash	Cameo appearance	
2012	Krantiveera Sangolli Rayanna	Sangolli Rayanna	Filmfare Award for Best Actor; Karnataka State Film Award for Best Actor; Suvarna Film Award for Best Actor	
2013	Bulbul	Vijay		
2013	Brindavana	Krishna		
2014	Agraja	Charan Das	Extended cameo appearance	
2014	Ambareesha	Ambarish		
2015	Mr. Airavata	Airavatha		
2015	Mumtaz	Himself	Cameo appearance	
2016	Viraat	Viraat Prasad		
2016	Jaggu Dada	Jaidev "Jaggu"		
2016	Nagarahavu	Himself	Special appearance in the song "Nagarahavu"	
2017	Chowka	Robert	Cameo appearance	
2017	Chakravarthy	Shankar "Chakravarthy"		
2017	Tarak	Tarak Ram	Nominated—Filmfare Award for Best Actor – Kannada	
2018	Prema Baraha	Hanuman devotee	Special Appearance in the song "Jai Hanumantha"	
2019	Yajamana	Krishna	SIIMA Award for Best Actor	
2019	Amar	Arjun Subbaiah	Cameo appearance	
2019	Kurukshetra	Duryodhana	50th Film as a lead actor	
2019	Odeya	Gajendra		
2021	Inspector Vikram	Himself	Cameo appearance	
2021	Roberrt	Robert / Raghava	Nominated -Filmfare Award for Best Actor – Kannada	
2023	Kranti	Kranti Rayanna		
2023	Garadi	Shankara	Cameo appearance	
2023	Kaatera	Kaatera	Nominated-Filmfare Award for Best Actor – Kannada; Nominated-SIIMA Award for Best Actor; Nominated-IIFA Utsavam for Best Actor	
2025	The Devil	Dhanush and Krishna	Dual role	
2026	Raktha Kashmira	Himself	Final film, Special appearance in the song "Star Star"	

=== As film producer ===
- Jothe Jotheyali (2006)
- Navagraha (2008)
- Bulbul (2013)
- Maduveya Mamatheya Kareyole (2016)

=== As film distributor ===
- Bulbul (2013)
- Brindavana (2013)
- Ugramm (2014)
- Oggarane (2014)
- Jai Lalitha (2014)
- Paramashiva (2014)
- Jai Bajarangabali (2014)
- Rhaatee (2015)
- Buguri (2015)
- Maduveya Mamatheya Kareyole (2016)
- Devara Naadalli (2016)
- Neer Dose (2016)
- Pushpaka Vimana (2017)
- Melkote Manja (2017)
- Life Jothe Ondu Selfie (2018)

=== As narrator ===
- Buguri (2015)
- Bharjari (2017)
- Ramadhanya (2018)
- Dasharatha (2019)
- Ombattane Dikku (2022)

=== Television ===
- Detective Chandrakanta
- Ambika

== Discography ==
=== As playback singer ===
- Saarathi (2011) - Haago Heege
- Ambareesha (2014) - Khel Khatam
- Dasharatha (2019) - Dasharatha Title Track
