= Arjun (2008 film) =

- Directed by: Shahuraj Shindhe
- Screenplay by: Janardhana Maharshi
- Story by: Shahuraj Sindhe
- Produced by: N Mohankumar; Shashikala Narendranath; N Jayanna; Bhogendra
- Starring: Darshan; Meera Chopra
- Cinematography: P. K. H. Das
- Edited by: Deepu S. Kumar
- Music by: V. Harikrishna
- Production company: Jayanna Films
- Release date: 12 August 2008
- Running time: 143 minutes
- Country: India
- Language: Kannada

Arjun is a 2008 Indian Kannada-language action thriller film directed by Shahuraj Shindhe. Darshan plays a cop in the titular role, alongside Meera Chopra (in her first and only Kannada film to date). The film features an ensemble cast, including Anant Nag, Urvashi, Suman, Kovai Sarala, and Sanjjana.

== Plot ==
Police officer Arjun has strong moral values and lets criminals off with a warning. But he is in a fix when he learns that his father is paying petty criminals to help him catch big criminals.

== Cast ==
- Darshan as Arjun
- Meera Chopra as Nila/Kodan Rama's daughter
- Anant Nag as Jayasimharaja
- Urvashi as Vishalakshi Jayasimha
- Suman as Surya alias Gunnies East
- Kovai Sarala as Surya's wife
- Sanjjana as Arjun's girlfriend
- Sharath Lohithaswa as Naga alias Medda Naga South
- Ajay as Ajaya alias Adda Kasubi West
- Amit Tiwari as Rahul alias Mama North
- Sathyajith as Police Officer
- Bullet Prakash as Auto Driver
- Sadhu Kokila as Vegetable Buyer
- Rekha Das as Vegetable Seller
- Shailaja Joshi as Kodan Rama's wife

== Production ==
Meera Chopra made her Kannada debut through this film. In this film, she was credited as Nila, which is her onscreen name in Kollywood. Darshan was signed in to play the cop role again after Ayya and Swamy and worked on this film simultaneously with Navagraha (2008).

== Soundtrack ==
The soundtrack of the film was composed by V. Harikrishna.

Track listing
No.	Title	Lyrics	Singer(s)	Length
1.	"Balle Balle"	V. Nagendra Prasad	Sonu Nigam, Shreya Ghoshal	5:16
2.	"Taubare Taubare"	Kaviraj	Tippu, Jassie Gift	4:12
3.	"Leftalli Jayamala"	Kaviraj	Jassie Gift	4:21
4.	"Gunturu Gunturu"	Kaviraj	Chaitra H. G., Jassie Gift, Tippu	4:32
5.	"Ye Kanaka"	V. Nagendra Prasad	Shankar Mahadevan	4:34
Total length:				22:55

== Release and reception ==
Arjun was theatrically released on 12 August 2008 on the same day as Ramya starrer Anthu Inthu Preethi Banthu.

A critic from Sify gave the film a verdict of "average" and opined that "Darshan fans is sure to lap up this mass action masala". Vijayasarathy of Rediff gave the film a rating of two out of five stars and wrote that "Darshan does his usual act, but he is handicapped by the lack of a proper story".

== Box office ==
Despite being a panned by critics, the film initially had high collections and performed well at the box office similar to Darshan's previous film Gaja.
