= Darshan (2004 film) =

- DVD cover
- Directed by: Ramesh Kitty
- Written by: Ramesh Kitty
- Produced by: R. B. S. Prasad
- Starring: Darshan; Navneet
- Cinematography: R Giri
- Edited by: T. Shashikumar
- Music by: Sadhu Kokila
- Distributed by: Super Shine Movies
- Release date: 9 April 2004
- Country: India
- Language: Kannada

Darshan is a 2004 Indian Kannada-language thriller film directed by Ramesh Kitty and starring Darshan and newcomer Navneet in leading roles, along with a supporting cast of Srujan Lokesh, Srinath, and Chithra Shenoy.

== Plot ==
Rahul returns to his foster father Appaji, a terrorist after completing his studies. Appaji reveals the death of Rahul's parents at the hands of Ramamurthy and sends him to seek revenge, also to pioneer a terrorist attack.

Ramamurthy lives a happy life with his wife Janaki, mother Renukamma and daughters Surabhi and Nandini. Surabhi's marriage is fixed with an NRI. Rahul and his fake mother Sumitra rescue Ramamurthy's family while they are attacked and soon become a part of the Murthy family. Nandini falls in love with him. An attack is made on the defense minister from which he miraculously escapes. After marriage Surabhi and her husband go to the airport to leave the country but are killed in the airplane blast. The defense minister was also travelling in the same plane. It is shown that Rahul is leader of the terrorist gang that killed the minister in the blast.

Murthy approaches Rahul with Nandini's marriage proposal to which he consents. On the day of engagement Nandini reveals the true nature of Rahul and the assistant police commissioner holds Rahul at point blank. However he manages to escape but dies in a car blast.

Rahul who has survived the blast asks Nandini to marry him which she refuses. A deranged Rahul turns into a killing machine vandalising the family of Nandini. He kills the assistant commissioner with the help of a sub inspector. Eventually he kills Sanjay, Nandini's fiancé in front of her eyes. After confessing his crimes he asks Nandini to enter his life. However, unable to forgive and forget, an angry Nandini shoots Rahul. As she walks away he opens his eyes indicating that he is still alive and will be an immortal as long as there is war in this world.

== Cast ==
- Darshan as Rahul
- Navaneeth as Nandini
- Srinath as Ramamurthy
- Srujan Lokesh as Sanjay
- Renukamma Murugodu as Renukamma
- Chitra Shenoy as Janaki
- Sathyajith as Appaji
- Renuka Prasad
- Satish Cadaboms

== Production ==
This film marks the directorial debut of Ramesh Kitty, who previously worked as an assistant director under like S. Narayan and Raj Kishore for fourteen years. Darshan accept to star in the film after hearing the story and his character is that of an orphan. This was the first film that model Navaneet shot for, but the Telugu film Seenu Vasanthi Lakshmi (2004) ended up releasing first. Srujan Lokesh was cast in a "special" role. After the censor board removed two thousand feet of the film, the scenes had to be reshot.

== Soundtrack ==
The music was composed by Sadhu Kokila and released by Anand Audio Video.

Darshan

Soundtrack album by Sadhu Kokila
- Released: Mar 9, 2004
- Recorded: 2004
- Genre: Soundtrack
- Length: 25:18
- Label: Anand Audio Video
- Producer: Sadhu Kokila

Sadhu Kokila chronology
Daasa (2003)	Darshan (2004)	Kalasipalya (2004)

Track list
No.	Title	Lyrics	Singer(s)	Length
1.	"O Surya"	V. Nagendra Prasad	Rajesh Krishnan	4:51
2.	"Manase Manase"	K. Kalyan	P. Unnikrishnan, Nanditha	5:20
3.	"Thangali"	V. Nagendra Prasad	K. S. Chithra, Sadhu Kokila	4:51
4.	"Bharatha Matheya"	V. Nagendra Prasad	Hemanth, Sadhu Kokila	6:01
5.	"Salu Salinalli"	V. Nagendra Prasad	Rajesh Krishnan	4:15
Total length:				25:18

== Reception ==
Deccan Herald wrote "Darshan lives his role and excels in action scenes. Debutant actress Navneeth has done a good job in the first part. Srujan, veteran actor Lokesh’s son, plays a key role . Sadhu Kokila has scored the music." The film had an average box office run and remains Kitty's only film to date.
