= Suntaragaali =

- DVD Cover
- Directed by: Sadhu Kokila
- Written by: Tushar Ranganath (Dialogues); Maasthi Upparahalli
- Screenplay by: Sadhu Kokila
- Story by: Tushar Ranganath
- Produced by: Kadur Umesh
- Starring: Darshan; Rakshita; Ashish Vidyarthi; Rangayana Raghu
- Cinematography: Anaji Nagaraj
- Edited by: T. Shashikumar
- Music by: Sadhu Kokila
- Production company: Priyanka Creations
- Distributed by: Jayanna Films
- Release date: 17 February 2006
- Running time: 160 minutes
- Country: India
- Language: Kannada

Suntaragaali (transl. Tornado) is a 2006 Indian Kannada-language masala film directed by Sadhu Kokila and produced by Kadur Umesh. Besides direction, Sadhu Kokila has composed the music and also starred in a supporting role. The film stars Darshan, Rakshita, and Ashish Vidyarthi, while Seetha, Umashree, and Rangayana Raghu appear in pivotal roles. The film's title is based on a song from Kalasipalya (2004). Duniya Soori was the co-director of this movie.

== Plot ==
Jaggi is a slum dweller who works for a small-time politician named D. Rajahuli and Health Minister Kalinga. Rajajuli gets an election ticket for the by-elections, and he gets the support of Jaggi and his gang. However, the opposition party headed by Lalitha Devi, an honest social worker, stands against Rajahuli. Jaggi soon learns that he is Lalitha's biological son and that Lalitha's husband, Kalinga, had killed her parents in a massacre for his political career and also made the people believe that Lalitha is mentally ill. After having survived a murder attempt by Kalinga's men, Lalitha decided to expose Kalinga by standing against him in the election. Learning this, Jaggi and his friends support Lalitha in her cause, and they finally defeat Rajahuli and expose Kalinga's real face to the people. The people kill Kalinga in a stampede, while Jaggi walks away with his foster parents, Lalitha, and his girlfriend, Manjula.

== Cast ==
- Darshan as Jaggi
- Rakshita as Manjula
- Ashish Vidyarthi as Kalinga
- Rangayana Raghu as D. Rajahuli
- Shobaraj as Krishnakumar Rao "Hawli Krishna"
- Sathyajith as Jaggi's foster father
- Sadhu Kokila as "Machine" Raja MBBS
- Bullet Prakash as Kari Idly
- Vaijanath Biradar as "Batti" Vikrama
- Seetha as Lalitha Devi
- Umashree as Jaya
- Malathi Sardeshpande
- Manya as film actress
- H. G. Dattatreya as Jagadish
- Suja Varunee in a cameo
- Petrol Prasanna as Cobra
- Gym Ravi
- Hanumanthegowda
- Lalithamma as Sarayi Angadi Sharada
- Vatara Mallesh as Koole
- G. K. Govinda Rao as Chief Minister
- Ramesh Pandit as Sundari
- Bharath Bhagavathar as Shivalingu
- Amulya as Rajahuli's daughter (uncredited)

== Soundtrack ==
The music of the film was composed by Sadhu Kokila. The lyrics were written by Tushar Ranganath and G P Rajarathnam.

Suntaragaali

Soundtrack album by Sadhu Kokila
- Released: 3 February 2006
- Genre: Feature film soundtrack
- Label: Akshaya Audio

No.	Title	Lyrics	Singer(s)	Length
1.	"Ene Madonna"	Ranganath	Rajesh Krishnan, Malathy Lakshman
2.	"Shame Shame Pappi Shame"	Ranganath	Gururaj Hosakote, Sadhu Kokila, Sowmya Raoh, Vijay Urs
3.	"Kode Kode Kode Kobbari Mithayi"	Ranganath	Jassie Gift, Anuradha Sriram
4.	"Neenanatti Belakangidde"	G. P. Rajarathnam	Sadhu Kokila
5.	"Ninnaane Ninnaane"	Ranganath	Kunal Ganjawala, K. S. Chithra

== Release ==
Suntaragaali was released on 17 February 2006 and received positive reviews from critics, it was declared successful at the box office ran more than 100 days in theatres.

The film was released at the same time as the Sudeep starrer My Autograph and there was a fierce competition between the two films. Both the films were successful at the box office, but Suntaragaali turned out to be more successful than My autograph.

== Reception ==
Film critic R. G. Vijayasarathy of IANS wrote that "Suntaragaali is presented differently with all the necessary commercial elements like action and comedy thrown in good measures".
