= Darshan (Kannada actor) =

Indian actor and film producer (born 1977)

- Born: Hemanth Kumar; 16 February 1977 (age 49); Ponnampet, Kodagu district, Karnataka, India
- Occupations: Actor; producer; distributor
- Years active: 1997–present
- Works: Full list
- Spouse: Vijayalakshmi (m. 2003)
- Children: 1
- Father: Thoogudeepa Srinivas
- Family: Dinakar Thoogudeepa (brother)

Signature
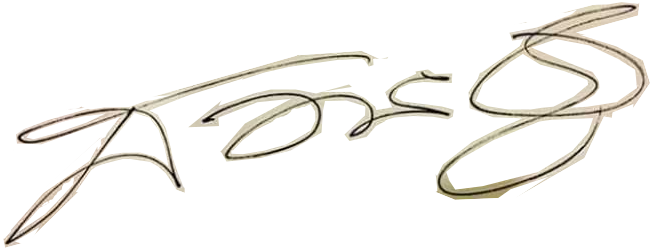

Hemanth Kumar (born 16 February 1977), better known by his stage name Darshan Thoogudeepa or simply Darshan, is an Indian actor, film producer and distributor who works predominantly in Kannada cinema. In a career spanning nearly three decades, Darshan has worked in over 50 films. He is one of the highest paid actors and leading contemporary actors of Kannada films. Darshan has a significant fan following and is referred to by his fans as Challenging Star and D Boss.

Darshan established the production house Thoogudeepa Productions in 2006. Its first production was Jothe Jotheyali, with Darshan in a special appearance. His performances in Anatharu (2007) and Krantiveera Sangolli Rayanna (2012) won him praise from critics; his performance in the latter as the 19th-century warrior Sangolli Rayanna won him the Karnataka State Film Award for Best Actor.

He began his acting career in soap operas and small films in the mid-1990s. His first big-screen lead role was in the 2002 film Majestic. Darshan starred in commercially successful films such as Kariya (2003), Kalasipalya (2004), Gaja (2008), Navagraha (2008), Saarathi (2011), Krantiveera Sangolli Rayanna (2012), Bulbul (2013), Yajamana (2019), Roberrt (2021) and Kaatera (2023).

== Early life ==
Darshan was born as Hemanth Kumar to actor Thoogudeepa Srinivas and Meena on 16 February 1977 in Ponnampet, Kodagu district, in the Indian state of Karnataka. He was given the name Hemanth Kumar at his birth. Thoogudeepa is a 1966 Kannada film in which Srinivas acted and gained fame, following which the sobriquet stuck to his name. A Popular actor during his time, he was reluctant towards Darshan following his path of film acting. Against his wishes, Darshan got himself enrolled in Ninasam, a theatre training institute, in Shimoga, before his father departed in 1995.

Darshan has a sister, Divya, and a younger brother, Dinakar Thoogudeepa, a filmmaker, running the production house, Thoogudeepa Productions. As a child, Darshan received his primary and secondary education at Mysuru.

== Acting career ==
=== Early career ===
After graduating from Ninasam, Darshan worked as a projectionist before becoming an assistant cameraman to cinematographer B. C. Gowrishankar. His first acting role came in S. Narayan's television soap. Narayan then offered him a supporting role in his 1997 film Mahabharatha. Darshan subsequently featured in films such as Devara Maga (2000), Ellara Mane Dosenu (2000), Bhoothayyana Makkalu (2000) and Mr. Harishchandra (2001), mostly in insignificant, supporting, and often bit roles. This period also saw him play minor roles in other television soaps and as a dubbing artiste for some cartoons.

=== 2001–2010 ===
Darshan's major break in films came with Majestic, directed by P. N. Satya and released in 2002, in which he played the role of Daasa, an innocent youth-turned-underworld don. He then appeared in films such as Dhruva, Ninagoskara, Kitty. He starred in Prem's directorial debut, the 2003 gangster film Kariya which became commercial successful and turn a cult classic. then he played a budding musician in Laali Haadu, Neenandre Ishta, then he appeared as a journalist in Lankesh Patrike and a blind poor man in Namma Preethiya Ramu then he starred in P. N. Satya's Daasa, produced by Ramesh Yadav, and appeared in the film Annavru. In 2004, he acted in more films Dharma, Darshan, Bhagawan, Kalasipalya and Saradara. Kalasipalya film was a major milestone in darshan's career and established himself as leading actor in sandalwood. later he acted in several box office successes films. In 2005 he appeared Ayya, Shastri and Swamy. In 2006, he acted Mandya, Suntaragaali, Dattha and in the action movie Thangigagi, which is a remake of Tamil film Thirupaachi. In 2007 he acted in Bhoopathi (2007), this film marks 25th film of Darshan in a lead role and the Debut collaboration with V. Harikrishna and further he starred in Snehana Preethina and Anatharu, where he starred with Upendra laid a strong foundation with the actor.

In 2008, Gaja helped him to establish a niche as a well built, rustic yet "posh" young man. Further movies include Indra (2008), Arjun (2008), and heist thriller Navagraha (2008), Yodha (2009), Abhay (2009). In 2010, he acted as cop disguised as a rogue in Porki, which was a remake of the 2006 Telugu film Pokiri. His next movie was Shourya (2010).

=== 2010–present ===
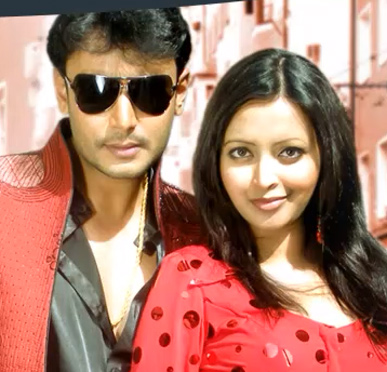
Darshan, Rekha Vedavyas in 2011 Kannada film Boss

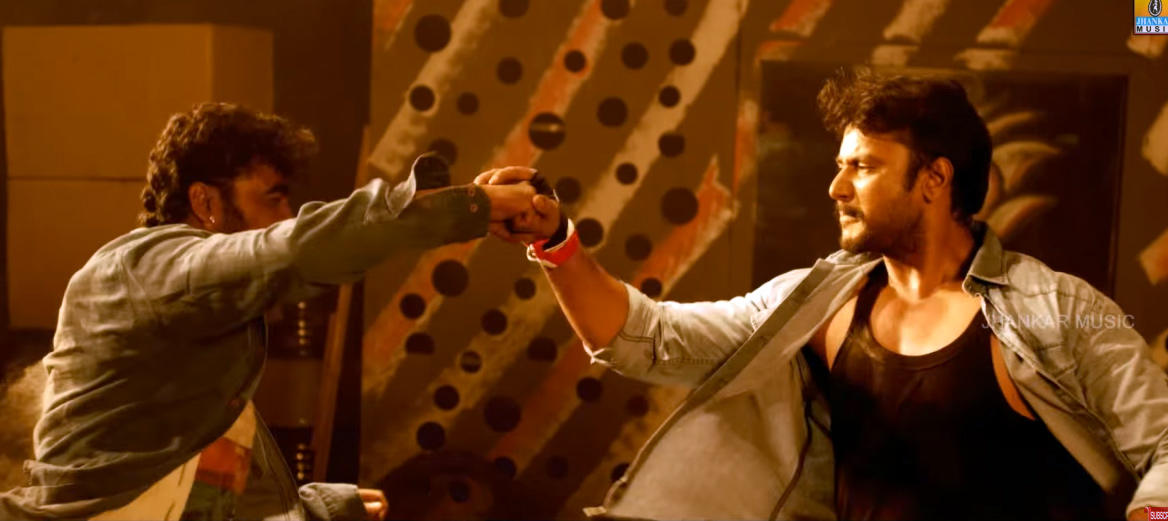
Darshan in an action sequence in 2015 Kannada film Mumtaz

Darshan's next releases were Boss (2011) and Prince (2011), soaring despite the flops. Next came the action film Saarathi. He made a comeback with Saarathi (2011), the highest-grossing Kannada film of that year. His 2012 release was Chingari. Next, he played a role in the historical movie Krantiveera Sangolli Rayanna and got his maiden Karnataka State Film Awards and Filmfare Award for best actor. In 2013, he had two releases, Bulbul and Brindavana.

His 2014 film Ambareesha received mixed responses, though it was commercially successful. In Mr. Airavata, he played the role of a police officer. The Hindu wrote: "He sizzles on the screen in his tailor-made avatar as Mr. Airavata". In Viraat, his first release of 2016, he played a businessman wanting to provide a solution to the issue of irregular power supply by taking up a thermal power project. The Indian Express, in its review, wrote that despite the loopholes, Darshan "cements them". The reviewer added: "He is seen in his signature style of action, dialogue delivery and mannerism. This time the actor breezes through some dance steps". Darshan's next film Jaggu Dada saw him play a gangster, and received largely negative reviews from critics.

Darshan's next release was Chakravarthy in 2017 based on Bangalore Underworld's true story, which gave a mixed response from the audience, but got recognition for the new look. In later 2017, his next movie Tarak was released which met with negative response. Following this, in 2019, Darshan's 50th film Yajamana released, becoming his biggest box office opener. Following the success of Yajamana, the big-budget Indian mythological movie Kurukshetra was released on 9 August 2019. Kurukshetra was well received by critics. In the same year, Darshan starred in another film, Odeya.

In June 2019, he teamed up with Tharun Sudhir for the film, Roberrt, which was released in 2021 and achieved box-office success. In 2023, he starred in Kranti, in which he plays a businessman who is called back by his school for 100 year celebration where he learn that the system is run by corrupt businessman and takes on the challenge to stop the closure of 100 schools and take down the corrupt businessman. The film received mixed to negative reviews from critics. Kranti theatrically released on 26 January 2023, coinciding with the Indian Republic Day holiday. Following this he appeared in a brief role in Yogaraj Bhat's directorial Garadi.

In 2024, Darshan's biggest box-office success came through Kaatera, for which he teamed again with director Tharun Sudhir and producer Rockline Venkatesh. The film became the highest grosser of the year and his portrayal of Kaatera character received widespread appreciation. In 2025, Darshan filmed The Devil, directed by Prakash.

== Personal life ==
Darshan married his relative Vijayalakshmi, a graduate in chemical engineering, on 19 May 2003 at the Dharmasthala Temple in Dharmasthala. They have a son, Vineesh. Darshan runs his own mini zoo in the far east of Mysuru, near Malavalli. Darshan's other passions are cars and bikes. Darshan had a strained relationship with Vijayalakshmi since 2011, with the latter filing a case for alleged domestic violence that year. Since 2015, Darshan was rumoured to be in a relationship with actress Pavithra Gowda. In January 2024, pavithra posted a collage video with Darshan to celebrate the 10th anniversary of their relationship.

Darshan campaigned for Bharatiya Janata Party during the 2023 Karnataka legislative assembly election, and for Star Chandru of the Indian National Congress during the 2024 Lok Sabha elections.

== Social works ==
Darshan adopted an elephant and a tiger in Mysore Zoo. He made an open appeal to the public to seek donations and adaptation of animals in nine zoos in Karnataka. This made Zoo Authority of Karnataka (ZAK) raise Rs.1 crore and overcome financial crisis which hit all the nine zoos in the state due to COVID-19 pandemic, since March 2020. He donated granite slabs for the construction of a memorial of the Dasara elephant Arjuna, which died in a rescue operation in December 2023.

== Legal issues ==
=== Assault cases ===
In 2021, he was accused of physically assaulting a waiter at a Mysuru hotel by Indrajit Lankesh. Reports later suggested the CCTV visuals were deleted and the incident was covered up, with the police compensating the waiter with Rs 50,000. Bharat, a Kannada film producer lodged a police complaint against Darshan in 2022 for threatening him with dire consequences.

In November 2023, Darshan was accused of setting up his dogs to attack his neighbor, since she had an argument with his caretaker over the parking space. An FIR was lodged against the actor under IPC 289 while the neighbour woman was compensated with hospital treatment charges.

In September 2011, his wife complained to police, accusing him of domestic violence. An attempted murder case was filed and he was subsequently arrested and spent 14 days in judicial custody at Parappana Agrahara. However, the marital discord was later settled out of court. He issued a public apology to his fans for the controversy. In 2016, his wife approached Bengaluru Police to complain against Darshan for alleged "objectionable behaviour".

In January 2023, Forest Department personnel raided the farmhouse of actor Darshan near T. Narsipur and seized four bar-headed geese on the grounds that he possessed them in violation of the law.

=== Murder of Renukaswamy ===
In June 2024, Darshan was arrested in Mysuru in connection with the murder of Renuka Swamy. Allegedly, Darshan, along with 10 other people, beat the victim in a shed in Pattanagere, and the victim subsequently died. Swamy allegedly had sent obscene messages to actress Pavithra Gowda. Along with Darshan, ten other individuals wer been judicially arrested and remained in custody for over 70 days. Darshan and Pavithra Gowda both were cited as the accused in the First Investigation Report. The victim, Renuka Swamy, was a worker at a medical shop and hailed from Chitradurga. He was killed on 8 June, but the body was discovered only on the next day. On 29 October 2024, he was granted interim bail for six weeks. On December 13, 2024, Karnataka High Court granted regular bail to Darshan and others. In 2025, after cancellation of the bail, the actor was sent back in custody, awaiting trial.

== Filmography ==
=== Production and distribution ===
In 2006, after much success in his career, he ventured into film production also. He established his own production house Thoogudeepa Productions and its first film was Jothe Jotheyali, starring Prem, Ramya and had Darshan in a special appearance. The film was a commercial hit running 150 days in theatres. In 2013, his family established a distribution company called Thoogudeepa Distributors. Bulbul (2013), produced under the home banner became the first movie to be distributed. Its other notable projects include distribution of Brindavana (2013), Prakash Raj's Oggarane (2014), Jai Lalitha (2014) (starring Sharan), Ugramm (starring Sriimurali) and Paramashiva (2014) (starring V. Ravichandran).

== Awards and nominations ==
Year	Award	Nominated work	Category	Result	Ref.
2012	Suvarna Film Awards	Saarathi	Favorite Hero	Won	
2012	Filmfare Awards South	Saarathi	Best Actor	Nominated	
2012	SIIMA Awards	Saarathi	Best Actor	Nominated	
2012	Bangalore Times Film Awards	Krantiveera Sangolli Rayanna	Best Actor	Won	
2013	SIIMA Awards	Krantiveera Sangolli Rayanna	Best Actor	Nominated	
2013	Suvarna Film Awards	Krantiveera Sangolli Rayanna	Best Actor	Won	
2013	Filmfare Best Actor Award	Krantiveera Sangolli Rayanna	Best Actor	Won	
2013	Karnataka State Film Award for Best Actor	Krantiveera Sangolli Rayanna	Best Actor	Won	
2014	SIIMA Awards	Bulbul	Best Actor	Nominated	
2018	Filmfare Awards South	Tarak	Best Actor	Nominated	
2021	9th SIIMA Award	Yajamana	Best Actor	Won	
2022	10th SIIMA Award	Roberrt	Best Actor	Nominated	
2022	Filmfare Awards South	Roberrt	Best Actor	Nominated	
2024	Chittara Star Awards	Kaatera	Best Actor	Won	
2024	Filmfare Best Actor Award	Kaatera	Best Actor	Nominated	
2024	SIIMA Awards	Kaatera	Best Actor	Nominated	
2024	IIFA South Awards	Kaatera	Best Actor	Nominated	

== See also ==
- List of dancers
