= Ninagoskara =

2004 Indian film

- DVD cover
- Directed by: Yogish Hunsur
- Written by: K. Nanjunda; S. M. Patil
- Produced by: Nirmal Jain; Suresh Jain
- Starring: Darshan; Naveen Mayur; Bhavna Pani; Ruchita Prasad
- Cinematography: Ramesh Babu
- Edited by: S. Manohar
- Music by: L. N. Shastri
- Production company: Mars Films
- Release date: 1 August 2002
- Running time: 148 minutes
- Country: India
- Language: Kannada

Ninagoskara (transl. For You) is a 2002 Indian Kannada-language comedy film directed by Yogish Hunsur, starring Darshan, Naveen Mayur, Bhavna Pani, and Ruchita Prasad. The plot is taken from the English movie of 1997, Addicted To Love, starring Meg Ryan.

== Plot ==
Manoj and Apoorva are two individuals betrayed by their respective lovers Varsha and Jay. After several years, Jay and Varsha are married and live in a posh locality. Coincidentally, Manoj and Apurva meet up and plan to shift next to the married couple. Somehow, they bug the couple's room with cameras to spy on them. In this process, Manoj starts developing a soft corner for Apurva.

== Cast ==
- Darshan as Manoj
- Naveen Mayur as Jay
- Bhavna Pani as Apoorva
- Ruchita Prasad as Varsha
- Komal as thief
- Bullet Prakash as supari killer
- Sanketh Kashi as Kannada, landlord
- Sunetra Pandit as Kannada's wife
- Ramesh Bhat
- Chitra Shenoy

== Production ==
The film was shot in Bangalore.

== Soundtrack ==
The music was composed by L. N. Shastri and released by Jhankar Music.

Ninagoskara

Soundtrack album by Sadhu Kokila
- Released: Sep 27, 2002
- Recorded: 2002
- Genre: Soundtrack
- Length: 34:22
- Label: Jhankar Music
- Producer: L. N. Shastri

Sadhu Kokila chronology
Haalu Sakkare (2001)	Ninagoskara (2002)	Mooru Manasu Nooru Kanasu (2003)

Track list
No.	Title	Lyrics	Singer(s)	Length
1.	"Ninagoskara"	Ramesh Rao	Shankar Mahadevan	5:07
2.	"Preetiyali Haaduve"	K. Kalyan	Sonu Nigam, Nanditha	5:19
3.	"Aasege Savira Roopa"	K. Kalyan	Sonu Nigam, Archana Udupa	5:08
4.	"Rexona Luxona"	K. Kalyan	Rajesh Krishnan, Sujatha Mohan	5:30
5.	"Bolore Bolore I Love U"	V. Nagendra Prasad	Hemanth, Sangeetha, Mahalakshmi Iyer	4:44
6.	"Prema Lokadinda"	K. Kalyan	Babul Supriyo, Mahalakshmi Iyer	5:05
7.	"Preetiyali Haaduve - Solo"	K. Kalyan	Sonu Nigam	3:29
Total length:				34:22
