= Snehana Preethina =

- DVD cover
- Directed by: Shahuraj Shindhe
- Written by: Rajeev Koul; Praful Parekh
- Screenplay by: Shahuraj Shinde
- Based on: Ishq (1997) by Indra Kumar
- Produced by: Anaji Nagaraj
- Starring: Darshan; Aditya; Sindhu Tolani; Lakshmi Rai
- Cinematography: Anaji Nagaraj
- Edited by: T. Shashikumar
- Music by: V. Harikrishna
- Production company: Namana Films
- Release date: 20 July 2007
- Country: India
- Language: Kannada

Snehana Preethina (transl. Friendship or Love) is a 2007 Indian Kannada-language film directed by Shahuraj Shindhe and is a remake of the 1997 Hindi film, Ishq. It stars Darshan, Aditya, Sindhu Tolani, and Lakshmi Rai.

== Plot ==
Surya (Darshan) and Adi (Aditya) are two close friends. Surya is a poor youngster who falls in love with Lakshmi (Lakshmi Rai), the daughter of a rich man, Rajeev Kumar (Rajeev). Meanwhile, Adi, the son of a rich man, Raghunath Rao (Rangayana Raghu), falls in love with a poor girl, Sindhu (Sindhu Tolani). This is not acceptable to the rich fathers, Rajeev Kumar and Raghunath Rao. They devise a plot to separate the lovers and want Adi to marry Lakshmi. Ignorant of the crooked plans of their parents, Adi and Lakshmi finally agree to marry each other. The incidents surrounding the weddings and the close friendship between Surya and Adi form the remaining plot.

== Cast ==
- Darshan as Surya
- Aditya as Adi
- Sindhu Tolani as Sindhu
- Lakshmi Rai as Lakshmi
- Rangayana Raghu as Raghunath Rao
- Rajeev as Rajeev Kumar
- Sadhu Kokila as the mediator
- Abhijeeth
- Mukhyamantri Chandru
- Doddanna
- Sundar Raj
- Tennis Krishna
- Sathyajith
- Ramesh Bhat
- Siddarth
- Kazan Khan as police inspector
- Jennifer Kotwal as herself in an item number

== Production ==
Two songs were shot in Switzerland. The song "Sakku Sakku" featuring Jennifer Kotwal was shot in Bangkok.

== Soundtrack ==
Snehana Preethina
- Soundtrack cover

Soundtrack album by V. Harikrishna
- Released: 13 July 2007
- Genre: Feature film soundtrack
- Length: 28:19
- Language: Kannada
- Label: Jhankar Music
- Director: V. Harikrishna

V. Harikrishna chronology
| Bhoopathi (2007) | Snehana Preethina (2007) | Krishna (2007) |

V. Harikrishna composed music for the soundtracks, and the lyrics were written by V. Nagendra Prasad. The album consists of six soundtracks.

Track listing
| No. | Title | Singer(s) | Length |
|---|---|---|---|
| 1. | "Dhava Dhava" | Kunal Ganjawala, Anuradha Sriram | 4:52 |
| 2. | "Jagave Barali" | S. P. Balasubrahmanyam, Srinivas, K. S. Chithra, Charan, Janani | 4:38 |
| 3. | "Nanna Chanchale" | S. P. Balasubrahmanyam, Shreya Ghoshal | 4:50 |
| 4. | "Osi Osi" | Karthik, Tippu, Shreya Ghoshal, Anuradha Sriram | 4:36 |
| 5. | "Sakku Sakku" | Rajesh Krishnan, Hemanth, Chaitra H. G. | 4:38 |
| 6. | "Yaaru Ee Bhoomige" | K. S. Chithra | 4:45 |
| Total length: | | | 28:19 |

== Reception ==
R. G. Vijayasarathy rated the film two-and-a-half out of five stars and wrote that "Snehaanaa Preethinaa is made enjoyable only by Darshan's comical transformation followed by Aadithya's adequate support. ". A critic from sify praised the performances of the cast, the music and the cinematography of foreign locales and concluded that the film was "average".
