= Prince (2011 film) =

- Theatrical release poster
- Directed by: Om Prakash Rao
- Written by: M. S. Ramesh (Dialogues)
- Screenplay by: N. Omprakash Rao
- Produced by: Sandesh Nagaraj
- Starring: Darshan; Jennifer Kotwal; Nikita Thukral
- Cinematography: Venus Murthy
- Edited by: Lakshman Reddy
- Music by: V. Harikrishna
- Production company: Sandesh Combines
- Distributed by: Sandesh Combines
- Release date: 1 April 2011
- Running time: 2 hours 42 minutes
- Country: India
- Language: Kannada

Prince is a 2011 Indian Kannada-language action film starring Darshan, Nikita Thukral, and Jennifer Kotwal in the lead roles. The film has been directed and written by Om Prakash Rao and produced by Sandesh Nagaraj under Sandesh Combines. The music was composed by V. Harikrishna. The movie is a remake of the 2006 Telugu film Shock.

== Premise ==
Vishnuvardhan "Vishnu", an advertising professional, sets on a crusade with his journalist friend, Preethi, to finish corrupt police officers, Hemanth, Abdullah, and Siddhanth, who are responsible for framing Vishnu as a naxalite and killing his pregnant wife, Anjali.

== Cast ==
- Darshan as Vishuvardhan "Vishnu"
- Nikita Thukral as Anjali
- Jennifer Kotwal as Preethi
- Adi Lokesh as Abdullah
- Avinash as Hemanth
- Rangayana Raghu as Raghunath
- Shobhraj as Siddhanth
- Ramesh Bhat as Police Commissioner
- Ravi Chethan as Vishnu's colleague
- Suchendra Prasad as CBI Officer Chandrakanth Nair
- Rekha. V. Kumar
- Sangeetha Gowda
- Bullet Prakash
- Rockline Sudhakar
- K. V. Manjayya
- Swasthik Shankar
- Ganesh Rao Kesarkar
- Shankar Narayan
- Aravind Rao
- Savitha Krishnamurthy
- Ravindra nath
- A. T. Raghu
- Sathyajith
- Anil Kumar
- Honnavalli Krishna
- Om Prakash Rao

== Soundtrack ==
The music was composed by V. Harikrishna and released by Anand Audio Video.

Prince

Soundtrack album by V. Harikrishna
- Released: Jan 31, 2011
- Recorded: 2011
- Genre: Soundtrack
- Length: 21:44
- Label: Anand Audio Video
- Producer: V. Harikrishna

V. Harikrishna chronology
| Rama Rama Raghu Rama (2011) | Prince (2011) | Prema Chandrama (2011) |

Track list
| No. | Title | Lyrics | Singer(s) | Length |
|---|---|---|---|---|
| 1. | "Benglooralli" | V. Nagendra Prasad | Tippu | 4:09 |
| 2. | "Khushiyalli" | Jayanth Kaikini | Shaan, Rita | 4:13 |
| 3. | "Sanje Timealli" | Yogaraj Bhat | Jassie Gift, Anuradha Bhat | 4:42 |
| 4. | "Sarvadhikari" | Kaviraj | Ranjith, Priya Himesh | 4:06 |
| 5. | "Karnataka Bumper" | V. Nagendra Prasad | Shankar Mahadevan, Anuradha Sriram | 4:34 |
| Total length: | | | | 21:44 |

== Reception ==
=== Critical response ===
A critic from The Times of India scored the film at 3 out of 5 stars and wrote "While Darshan has done justice to the role, Nikhita, who begins on a glamorous note stirs out a good performance. Venus Murthya's cinematography fails to impress". Shruti Indira Lakshminarayana from Rediff.com scored the film at 1.5 out of 5 stars and says "Om and Darshan have given entertaining films like Ayya and Kalasipalya. However, they disappoint with Prince. But then again you can't say they didn't warn you as their film posters read Prince… 'The stupid fellow'!". BSS from Deccan Herald wrote "if only for the chase in the climax. Using the thespians’ names and their cutouts are mere ruses. A ‘different’ revenge story whose origins are numerous and confusing, Prince is strictly for Darshan and Omprakash Rao fans". A critic from Bangalore Mirror wrote " If only the director had paid more attention to the nuances and intricacies. To sum up, an effort gone awry, a far cry from Rao’s previous work Huli, a technically-perfect flick".
