= Jaggu Dada =

- Theatrical release poster
- Directed by: Raghavendra Hegde
- Screenplay by: Yunus Sajawal
- Story by: Raghavendra Hegde
- Produced by: Raghavendra Hegde
- Starring: Darshan; Deeksha Seth; Srujan Lokesh; Ananth Nag; P. Ravi Shankar
- Cinematography: H. C. Venu
- Edited by: Pankaj Sharma
- Music by: V. Harikrishna
- Production companies: R9 Entertainment; RH Entertainment
- Distributed by: R9 Entertainment
- Release date: 10 June 2016
- Running time: 158 minutes
- Country: India
- Language: Kannada

Jaggu Dada is a 2016 Indian Kannada-language masala film directed and produced by Raghavendra Hegde. The film stars Darshan in the titular role and Deeksha Seth. Rachita Ram make guest appearances. It was released on 10 June 2016 across Karnataka.

The main character is part of a family of dons. His mother prepares an arranged marriage for him, with the indented bride being a bar dancer. His grandfather's ghost instead pressures him to find a moral girl to marry. The main character finds an ideal bride through a marriage bureau, but she is reluctant to marry a criminal.

== Plot ==
Jaggu Dada belongs to a family of dons. His grandfather, Shankar Dada, retires from his don activities, realizing his mistake, insists that his son, Veeru Dada, and grandson, Jaggu Dada, also withdraw from their business. But Jaggu Dada's mother builds up an ambition to make him an international don and marry him off to a bar dancer, Champa. Shankar Dada, on his death bed, calls Jaggu and makes him vow not to indulge in don activities and marry a socially moral girl, not Champa. Upon his death, Shankar Dada is shown to become a spirit and begins haunting Jaggu to fulfill his promise.

Jaggu Dada goes to Mumbai as 'Jayadev' not revealing his real identity. He takes the help of Gowri who runs a marriage bureau. After rejecting two girls, he meets another girl who wants to study but just accepts for her parents’ happiness. He helps her to talk to her parents. Later, he falls for Gowri who too later reciprocates it. But after learning of his criminal past she breaks up with him and is forced to marry a gunda. On the day of her marriage, Jaggu's mother and Champa realize their mistake and give hope to Gowri. Jaggu manages with the help of his grandfather's spirit to marry Gowri and live happily.

== Cast ==
- Darshan as Jaggu Dada
- Deeksha Seth as Gowri
- Ananth Nag as Sathya Narayan
- P. Ravi Shankar as Shankar Dada
- Urvashi as Jaggu Dada's mother
- Srujan Lokesh as Majnu
- Sharath Lohitashwa as Veeru Dada
- Vishal Hegde as Venki
- Gayathri Iyer as Champa
- Rajat Bedi as Subhash Bhai, Mumbai don
- Amit Tiwari as Sakhti, Subhash Bhai's brother
- Achyuth Kumar as Uday Naik
- Shobhraj
- Sadhu Kokila as Sorcerer
- Bullet Prakash
- Rachita Ram in a guest appearance
- Deepika Kamaiah in a guest appearance
- Sanketh Kashi
- Surya Narayan Waali

== Production ==
The production team shot for Jaggu Dada in Bengaluru, Mumbai, Goa etc. Two songs of the film were shot in some of the remote places in Italy. At Pompeii, the film unit shot some sequences making it the first Indian film to explore the place.

== Soundtrack ==
Jaggu Dada

Soundtrack album by V. Harikrishna
- Released: 9 May 2016
- Genre: Feature film soundtrack
- Length: 14:07
- Label: D Beats
- Producer: V. Harikrishna

The music of the movie is composed by V. Harikrishna. The audio was released on 9 May 2016 through D-Beats. The soundtrack is composed by V. Harikrishna and on 16 August 2015, the film's audio was launched.

=== Track listing ===
| No. | Title | Lyrics | Singer(s) | Length |
|---|---|---|---|---|
| 1. | "Jaggu Duniya" | Chethan Kumar | Ranjith, Santhosh Venky, Shashank Sheshagiri | 03:59 |
| 2. | "Funtanatun" | Dr. V. Nagendra Prasad | Hemanth | 04:11 |
| 3. | "Thale Keduthe" | Yogaraj Bhat | Sonu Nigam | 04:20 |
| 4. | "Vaale Jumuki" | Kaviraj | Tippu, Priya Himesh | 03:53 |

== Reception ==
=== Critical response ===
Sunayana Suresh of The Times of India gave the film a rating of 2/5 and wrote "this film would have worked better for all audiences. That said, this one could be worth a visit to the hall for Darshan fans and also people who love their fare of hero-centric subjects with bombastic commercial elements." Shyam Prasad S of Bangalore Mirror gave the film a rating of 2/5 and wrote "Jaggu Dada may still enthuse fans of the star, but for the rest, it could be an underwhelming experience." ShyamPrasad SM of Deccan Chronicle gave the film a rating of 2/5 and wrote "'traditional' die-hard fan of challenging star Darshan. Wonder, even the present age smart kids could hardly laugh at these kinds of untraditional humour. May the soul of the grandpa finally rest in peace after more than two-and-a-half hours of 'restless' comedy."
