= Mallikarjuna (film) =

- Directed by: Murali Mohan
- Based on: Thavasi (Tamil)
- Produced by: S. Dinesh Gandhi
- Starring: V. Ravichandran; Sadha; Seetha; Hema Choudhary
- Music by: S. A. Rajkumar
- Release date: 27 May 2011
- Country: India
- Language: Kannada

Mallikarjuna is a 2011 Kannada-language action film directed by Murali Mohan and starring V. Ravichandran and Sadha in the lead roles. S. A. Rajkumar has composed the soundtrack and the background score. The film was theatrically released in May 2011. The film is remake of the 2001 Tamil film Thavasi starring Vijaykanth and Soundarya.

== Cast ==
- V. Ravichandran as Mallikarjuna and Surya
- Sadha as Priya
- Seetha
- Ramya Barna as Nandini
- Hema Choudhary as Savithramma
- Ashish Vidyarthi as Vishakanta
- Ramesh Bhat
- M. N. Lakshmi Devi
- Adi Lokesh
- Bullet Prakash
- Raju Talikote

== Soundtrack ==
S. A. Rajkumar has composed the music for the film. Rajkumar reused "Katre Poongatre" from Priyamaana Thozhi as "Chanda Oh".

Song title	Singers
"Chanda Oh Chanda"	Karthik, Priya Himesh
"Hey Miya Miya"	Tippu, Ramya
"Rudram Thrinetram"	S. A. Rajkumar
"Shuruvayithe"	Karthik, Rita, Priya Prakash
"Olle Janakke Kaala"	S. A. Rajkumar
"Pallakki Haaduva"	Rajesh Krishnan, Anuradha Sriram

== Reception ==
=== Critical response ===
A critic from The Times of India scored the film at 3 out of 5 stars and says "WhileRavichandran as Surya looks smart, his role as Mallikarjuna is less impressive with silly make-up. Sada is okay. Ramesh Bhat impresses. Cinematography by G S V Seetharam and music by S A Rajkumar are average". A critic from The New Indian Express wrote "Music director SA Rajkumar has done a neat job. Cinematographer Seetharam has also worked well behind the camera. It is worth watching if you are capable of coping up with this stale script and meaningless stunt sequences". A critic from Bangalore Mirror wrote "The story has some stale jokes (remember the original is 10 years old) and even older situations. A lot was expected, but music director SA Rajkumar comes out with average numbers. It is high time filmmakers tried out something different, instead of churning out remakes".
