= Dhruva (2002 film) =

- Directed by: M. S. Ramesh
- Written by: M. S. Ramesh; R. Rajashekar
- Produced by: G. D. Suresh Gowda; S Srinivasa Murthy
- Starring: Darshan; Sherin; Om Puri
- Cinematography: Seenu
- Edited by: Shyam
- Music by: Gurukiran
- Production company: Sri Seetha Bhairaveshwara Productions
- Release date: 13 September 2002
- Running time: 149 minutes
- Country: India
- Language: Kannada

Dhruva is a 2002 Indian Kannada-language action drama film directed and co-written by M. S. Ramesh along with R. Rajashekar. It stars Darshan and Sherin in the lead roles, whilst Om Puri plays an important role. The film featured original score and soundtrack was composed by Gurukiran.

== Cast ==
- Darshan as Dhruva
- Sherin as Rashmi
- Om Puri as Pratap Singh
- Avinash as MLA Shambhulingappa
- H. G. Dattatreya
- Anantha Velu as a politician
- Ravi Chethan
- Hamsa
- Kavana
- Dharma as Anil Raj
- Rajeev Rathod
- Shankar Bhat
- M. S. Umesh
- Krishne Gowda
- NGEF Ramamurthy
- Sumithra
- Bullet Prakash
- Sadhu Kokila
- P. N. Sathya
- Datthaa Manjeshwar

== Production ==
Darshan shot for this film around the same time as Kariya.

== Soundtrack ==
The music was composed by Gurukiran for Ashwini Audio label.

Track listing
No.	Title	Lyrics	Singer(s)	Length
1.	"Cheluvina Chakori"	V. Nagendra Prasad	P. Unnikrishnan, K. S. Chithra
2.	"O Vidhiye"	Kaviraj	P. Unnikrishnan
3.	"Haadiyali Beediyali"	Sriranga	Hemanth Kumar
4.	"Meetaru Meetaru"	V. Nagendra Prasad	Gurukiran
5.	"Dina Heege Ninne"	V. Nagendra Prasad	Kumar Sanu, K. S. Chithra
