= Googal (film) =

2018 Indian Kannada-language film

- Directed by: V. Nagendra Prasad
- Written by: V. Nagendra Prasad
- Screenplay by: V. Nagendra Prasad
- Produced by: V. Nagendra Prasad; N.Sridhar; L.Ashwathnaryan
- Starring: V. Nagendra Prasad; Shubha Poonja
- Cinematography: Nagarjun
- Edited by: K.M.Prakash
- Music by: V. Nagendra Prasad
- Production company: Utsav Movies
- Distributed by: Mysore Talkies
- Release date: 16 February 2018
- Running time: 128 min
- Country: India
- Language: Kannada

Googal (or Google) is a 2018 Indian Kannada-language romantic family drama film directed by V. Nagendra Prasad starring himself and Shubha Poonja. The film revolves around a husband and wife, and the wife's boyfriend. The film takes place in an ancient village named Googal in Raichur district. The film's music is by V. Nagendra Prasad.

== Cast ==
- V. Nagendra Prasad as Harish
- Shubha Poonja as Nandini
- Shobaraj as Baddi Babanna
- Deepak Ganesh as Balu
- Amrutha Rao
- Muni

== Reception ==
A critic from The New Indian Express wrote that "Dr Nagendra Prasad, as a producer, was clever to make this movie on a shoe-string budget. You can go on this journey with him but, if you are looking for answers, stick to Google". A critic from The Times of India rated the film two-and-a-half out of five stars and wrote that "Watch this film if you want to watch an emotional tale, this does promise different fare from the regular masala commercial films".
