= Ambi (film) =

- Directed by: V. Nagendra Prasad
- Written by: V. Nagendra Prasad
- Produced by: N Kumar
- Starring: Aditya; Manya
- Cinematography: J. G. Krishna
- Edited by: Rajashekar Reddy
- Music by: V. Nagendra Prasad
- Production company: Sri Lakshmi Films
- Distributed by: Sri Lakshmi Films
- Release date: 28 April 2006
- Running time: 145 minutes
- Country: India
- Language: Kannada

Ambi is a 2006 Indian Kannada-language romantic film directed by V. Nagendra Prasad and produced by N. Kumar. The film stars Aditya and Manya in the lead roles. The film has musical score by V. Nagendra Prasad. The film was a flop at boxoffice.

== Cast ==
- Aditya as Ambi
- Manya
- Shobaraj
- Kishore
- Joe Simon
- R. G. Vijayasarathy
- Bank Janardhan
- Mandeep Roy
- Chitra Shenoy
- Bullet Prakash
- Shankar
- Vijay as Ambi's friend

== Soundtrack ==
The music was composed by V. Nagendra Prasad.

All lyrics are written by V. Nagendra Prasad.

| No. | Title | Singer(s) | Length |
|---|---|---|---|
| 1. | "Catch Catch Hidi" | Gururaj Hoskote, Raju Hoskote, Viji, V. Nagendra Prasad | 5.16 |
| 2. | "Hey Hrudaya" | Rajesh, Chithra | 4:59 |
| 3. | "Nee Hinga Nodidare" | L. N. Shastry, Naga Chandrika | 4:33 |
| 4. | "Brahma O Brahma" | Madhu Balakrishnan | 3:10 |
| 5. | "Ambi" (Title) | Nagendra Prasad, Chaitanya | 3:24 |
| 6. | "Manasige Manasige" | Rajesh, K. S. Chithra | 5:00 |
| 7. | "Meter Iddone" | Usha Uthup, Rajesh | 4:37 |
| 8. | "Yede Halu" | Shankar Mahadevan | 4:38 |

== Reception ==
R. G. Vijayasarathy of IANS stated that "Audithya's new film Ambi ends up as an average fare belying expectations of Kannada film fans and the film industry representatives". A critic from Rediff opined that "This could have been a better film. Sadly, performance wise, Audithya has very little scope to prove his talent. A talented actress like Maanya is also wasted here. The result is mediocre fare". A critic from webindia123 said that "The tragedy of 'Ambi' is that it does not fall under any specific genre. You cannot call it a full-blooded action film or a family drama. It is not a comedy either. It is just a mixture of everything but none of them in the right proportions or right place". A critic from Viggy wrote that "It has nothing new to offer - be it the story nor the screenplay".
