= Ayya (2005 Kannada film) =

- DVD Cover
- Directed by: Om Prakash Rao
- Story by: Hari
- Produced by: Byre Gowda
- Starring: Darshan; Rakshita
- Cinematography: Anaji Nagaraj
- Edited by: S. Manohar
- Music by: V. Ravichandran
- Production company: Bhavya Cine Creations
- Release date: 4 February 2005
- Country: India
- Language: Kannada

Ayya is a 2005 Indian Kannada-language film directed by Om Prakash Rao, starring Darshan and Rakshita. Darshan plays the role of a brave police officer prepared to go to any lengths to control crime in the city. The background music and soundtrack were scored by V. Ravichandran. Despite being an unofficial remake of Saamy, the director had revealed that he had copied scenes from nine other movies including the Tamil film Madhurey, which also stars Rakshita as the female lead.

The film enjoyed box office success, with many cinemas running it for over 100 days.

== Cast ==
- Darshan as ACP Ayya
- Rakshita as Suchitra
- Hema Choudhary
- Srinagar Kitty
- Avinash
- Dharma
- Sadhu Kokila
- Shobhraj
- Bhavya Bhuvanahalli Chandre gowda
- Mandeep Roy
- Ramesh Pandit as Seetharama

== Production ==
Ayya marks the third collaboration of Om Prakash Rao with Darshan after Annavru and Kalasipalya

== Soundtrack ==
The music was composed by actor V. Ravichandran collaborating with Om Prakash Rao for the second time after Sahukara (2004) (other than acting) and his first collaboration with Darshan.

Ayya

Soundtrack album by V. Ravichandran
- Released: 11 January 2005
- Genre: Feature film soundtrack
- Length: 26:56
- Language: Kannada
- Label: Anand Audio
- Producer: V. Ravichandran

V. Ravichandran chronology
Malla (2004)	Ayya (2005)	Panduranga Vittala (2005)

Track #	Song	Singer(s)	Duration
1	"Kettode Kettode"	L. N. Shastry, Suma Shastry	03:59
2	"Tabla Tabla"	Udit Narayan, Anuradha Sriram	04:52
3	"Simha Gharjane"	Hemanth Kumar	04:46
4	"Surya Jothe"	L. N. Shastry	04:37
5	"Ee Prema"	Udit Narayan, Archana Udupa	04:26
6	"Rakshita Rakshita"	Badri Prasad, Manjula Gururaj	04:00

== Reception ==
A critic from Rediff.com wrote that "Over all, Ayya is what they call a timepass movie". SND of Deccan Herald wrote "There are loads of action scenes and the dialogues are catchy. There are also some references to the nexus between politicians and rowdies. The director has worked hard to include all important 'masala' ingredients to attract audiences to the film, especially Darshan’s fans".

== Legacy ==
The dialogue "Naan convent alli odi police agiddalla. Corporation school alli odi police aagiddu" (Means, "I have not become a police officer by studying in the convent, I am a police officer who studied in corporation school"), became popular in Karnataka.
