= Swamy (2005 film) =

- DVD Cover
- Directed by: M. S. Ramesh
- Written by: M. S. Ramesh; Rajashekar
- Produced by: Bharathi Basavaraju
- Starring: Darshan; Gayatri Jayaraman; Avinash; Rangayana Raghu
- Cinematography: Dasari Seenu
- Edited by: S. Manohar
- Music by: Gurukiran
- Production company: Darshan Films
- Release date: 30 September 2005
- Running time: 148 minutes
- Country: India
- Language: Kannada

Swamy is a 2005 Indian Kannada-language romantic action film directed and co-written by M. S. Ramesh and produced by Bharathi Basavaraju. It stars Darshan, Gayatri Jayaraman in lead roles, besides Avinash, Jai Jagadish and Rangayana Raghu in other pivotal roles. The film was released on 30 September 2005 across Karnataka cinema halls and received a mixed response from critics and audiences. The critics mentioned that the storyline draws parallels from Tamil films Saamy and Anjaneya (Both 2003).

== Cast ==
- Darshan as Narayana Swamy
- Gayatri Jayaraman as Aishwarya
- Avinash as Aravinda Desai
- Jai Jagadish as Police Commissioner
- Rangayana Raghu as Police Constable
- Sadhu Kokila
- Ashok
- Bhavya
- Bhuvanahalli Chandre Gowda
- Nagashekar
- Sriraksha
- Shobaraj as Paramashiva

== Soundtrack ==
The music of the film was composed by Gurukiran.

Swamy

Soundtrack album by Gurukiran
- Released: 2005
- Genre: Feature film soundtrack
- Label: Ashwini Audio

No.	Title	Lyrics	Singer(s)	Length
1.	"Gaali Bandaaga"	Kaviraj	Rajesh Krishnan, Chaitra H. G.
2.	"Rambhe Ninge"	Bangi Ranga	Gururaj Hosakote, Usha Uthup
3.	"Minchina Kannina"	Kaviraj	Udit Narayan, Shreya Ghoshal
4.	"Dikkettu Ninthaga"	V. Nagendra Prasad	S. P. Balasubrahmanyam
5.	"Jhum Antha"	Bhangi Ranga	Udit Narayan, Malathi

== Reception ==
Film critic R. G. Vijayasarathy of IANS wrote that "Darshan starred 'Swamy' is a replica of the actor's previous hit "Ayya' in which he played the daring police officer's role with aplomb". WebIndia123 wrote "Swamy" is a big letdown for Darshan fans. It is better for the actor to concentrate on good scripts in the future". Viggy wrote "If you want to see Darshan coming out of his existing image, you can help by watching Swamy!". Indiaglitz wrote "There is no logic throughout but only Darshan magic. This film appears to be set for front benchers and Darshan fans".
