= Yodha (2009 film) =

- VCD Cover
- Directed by: Om Prakash Rao
- Written by: M. S. Ramesh R. Rajashekhar (Dialogues)
- Story by: Senthil Kumar
- Based on: Bose (Tamil)
- Produced by: Rockline Venkatesh
- Starring: Darshan; Nikita Thukral; Ashish Vidyarthi
- Cinematography: K. M. Vishnuvardhan
- Edited by: Lakshman Reddy
- Music by: Hamsalekha
- Production company: Rockline Productions
- Release date: 19 June 2009
- Running time: 152 minutes
- Country: India
- Language: Kannada

Yodha (transl. Warrior) is a 2009 Indian Kannada-language action thriller film directed by Om Prakash Rao and produced by Rockline Venkatesh. it is a remake of Tamil film Bose. The film stars Darshan, Nikita Thukral, Ashish Vidyarthi, Rahul Dev and Avinash Yelandur. Yodha was released on 19 June 2009.

== Plot ==
Karnataka state Home Minister, Patil and his associates are kidnapped by a terrorist named Qasim. They demand their men to be released, but the central government refuses the demand and assigns NSG commando operation with Capt. Ram in the lead. Ram and the commandos successfully rescue Patil. However, the commandos and terrorists suffer equal losses of their men in the operation. Due to threats against Patil, Ram and his team are deployed to the minister's security. During the Republic day program in New Delhi, Patil gets attracted to the program's dancer, Asha, and he secretly brings her to his room and tries to have sex.

Ram enters Patil's room due to an uproar where he attacks Patil and sends Asha out of the house without noticing anyone. Ram is questioned for the attack, but he doesn't reveal the reason and is court-martialed. He returns home and lives with his family while Patil is discharged from the hospital and still suffers from serious injury. Enraged, Patil secretly assigns underworld gangsters to kill Ram. Ram manages to defeat them, making Patil target his family. While being court-martialed, Ram gathers information regarding terrorists' plans to attack various cities in India using RDX and other deadlier weapons.

Meanwhile, Asha learns that Ram is court-martialed due to the incident, and she reveals Patil's misbehavior to Ram's senior officers. A chase ensues where Ram's father is killed and his family is kidnapped by Patil. At the hideout, Ram learns that the kidnapping was a planned act by Patil to gain sympathy votes in the upcoming elections to become the state's CM. Ram gets enraged and captures Qasim. He kidnaps and kills Patil, while the squad suspects Qasim for the attack and shoots him to death. After this, Ram is reinstated into the service and reunites with his family.

== Cast ==
- Darshan as Capt. M. Ram
- Nikita Thukral as Asha
- Ashish Vidyarthi as Patil
- Rahul Dev as Qasim
- Srinivasa Murthy as Ram's father
- Avinash as an army officer
- Lokanath
- Sadhu Kokila
- Padma Vasanthi
- Shobaraj
- Ramesh Bhat
- Rekha Kumar
- Tharakesh Patel
- Arasu Maharaj
- Prakash Heggodu
- Bhaskar Surya
- Kote Prabhakar
- Mallesh Gowda
- Shivaji Rao Jadhav
- B. K. Shankar
- Stunt Siddu
- Ravi Chethan
- Aravind Rao
- Ravindra Nath

== Production ==
The film marks the first collaboration of Rockline Venkatesh and Darshan.

== Soundtrack ==
The music of the film was composed and the lyrics were written by Hamsalekha.

Yodha

Soundtrack album by Hamsalekha
- Released: 2009
- Genre: Feature film soundtrack
- Label: Adithya Music

No.	Title	Lyrics	Singer(s)	Length
1.	"Lip To Lip"	Hamsalekha	Jassie Gift, Chaitra H. G.
2.	"Namm India"	Hamsalekha	K. S. Chithra
3.	"Surya Nodayya"	Hamsalekha	Suresh Peters, Anuradha Sriram
4.	"Mangalyam Tantunanena"	Hamsalekha	Rajesh Krishnan, Nanditha
5.	"Namm India"	Hamsalekha	Vijay Yesudas

== Reception ==
R. G. Vijayasarathy of Rediff gave 2.5 out of 5 stars and wrote "As far as performances go, Darshan knows how to please his fans. His dialogue delivery, action somersaults and fights will definitely please his fans. Nikitha looks fabulous throughout the film. She is good in a couple of comedy sequences too. Ashish Vidyarthi is okay while Sreenivasa Murthy excels in a few sequences that are written for him. Sadhu Kokila's comedy on the other hand is quite irritating. The New Indian Express wrote "Finally, how Ram join hands with Asha and how he teaches Patil a lesson is the climax. The film ends with Ram re-joining the army. The music of the film by Hamsalekha is good. All-in-all the film is a worth watch for all." Deccan Herald wrote "The dialogues make liberal use of names like Afzal Guru, Dr Abdul Kalam and Khan Abdul Ghaffar Khan with devastating effect — any feeling of patriotism will die a quick death. And so, Yodha's mission remains unfulfilled."
