= Shastri (2005 film) =

2005 Kannada film

- DVD Cover
- Directed by: P. N. Sathya
- Written by: P. N. Sathya
- Screenplay by: P. N. Sathya
- Produced by: Anaji Nagaraj
- Starring: Darshan; Manya
- Cinematography: Venus Moorthy
- Edited by: S. Manohar
- Music by: Sadhu Kokila
- Production company: Namana Films
- Release date: 10 June 2005
- Country: India
- Language: Kannada

Shastri (also known as Darshan Shastri) is a 2005 Kannada-language action film written and directed by P. N. Sathya and produced by Anaji Nagaraj for Namana films. The film stars Darshan and Manya. The musical score is by Sadhu Kokila.

== Synopsis ==
Shastri tells of the downfall of impulsive medical student Shastri. After facing betrayal in love he journeys through crime after convincing his family that he is dead. He becomes a victim of circumstances and joins the underworld. However, he is a Good Samaritan don who helps the poor and depressed. In the bargain, he antagonizes many cruel dons who have scores to settle with him.

He meets Manya, an arrogant rich girl whom he first spurns. Manya takes revenge on Shastri and is indirectly responsible for his entry into the underworld. Shastri tries to turn a new leaf, but is not successful. Finally, he is stabbed by an adversary in a fight, but he survives and is later reunited with his lover.

== Cast ==
- Darshan as Rama Shastri (Shastri)
- Manya as Kanakambari (Kanaka)
- Chitra Shenoy as Kanaka's mother
- Bullet Prakash as Shastri's friend
- Hanumanthe Gowda as Kanaka's father
- G. K. Govinda Rao as Shastri's father
- Sathyajith as mobster

== Soundtrack ==
Soundtrack was composed by Sadhu Kokila. The song "Sumne Sumne" was loosely based on the Malay song "Hati Kama" by Pak Ngah.

- "Sumne Sumne" - Udit Narayan, Madhuvati
- "Style Varevaa" - Tippu, Anuradha Sriram
- "O Hrudaya" - Hemanth Kumar

== Release ==
The movie was inspired by the 1995 classic Om. Shastri premiered on Udaya TV Channel. The film was dubbed in Hindi as Main Hoon Yoddha. The digital version was released in June 2017.

== Critical reception ==
The film received extremely negative reviews. Indiaglitz wrote "Shastri is a badly made, poorly directed film. Its music by Sadhu Kokila is also poor and even the photography can not be spoken about in an appreciative measure. Vigilant fans will find the film just a hotch potch of many non Kannada films." Rediff called it "badly made and poorly directed".
