= Kariya (film) =

2003 gangster film by Prem

- Movie Poster
- Directed by: Prem
- Written by: Malavalli Saikrishna (Dialogues)
- Screenplay by: Prem
- Story by: Prem
- Produced by: Anekal Balaraju
- Starring: Darshan; Abinayasri
- Cinematography: M. R. Seenu
- Edited by: Srinivas P. Babu
- Music by: Gurukiran
- Production company: Santhosh Enterprises
- Release date: 3 January 2003
- Running time: 144 minutes
- Country: India
- Language: Kannada

Kariya is a 2003 Indian Kannada-language gangster film directed by Prem, in his directoral debut, and produced by Anekal Balaraju under Santhosh Enterprises. The film stars Darshan in titular role, alongside Abinayasri, Nanda Kishore and Umesh Punga. The music was composed by Gurukiran, while cinematography and editing were handled by M. R. Seenu and Srinivas P. Babu respectively.

== Plot ==
It narrates the tragic story of a homeless assassin-for-hire Kariya, who falls for Maya, a well educated and rich dancer. Although she tries to convey her feelings, Kariya hesitantly moves away causing her to pledge that she will only reciprocate his feelings if he proclaims his love for her. Meanwhile, a few local thugs try to entrap Kariya and seek vengeance for the death of their friend.

== Cast ==
- Darshan as Kariya
- Abinayasri as Maya
- B. Jayashree
- Mico Nagaraj
- Umesh Punga
- Nanda Kishore
- Dashavara Chandru
- Nandesh
- John
- Five Star Ganesh
- Dr. Suresh Sharma

The film features 23 real underworld gangsters

== Soundtrack ==
Kariya

Soundtrack album by Gurukiran
- Released: 27 May 2002
- Recorded: 2002
- Genre: Feature film Soundtrack

S. No	Track title	Lyricist(s)	Singer(s)
1	"Hrudayada Olage"	V. Nagendra Prasad	S. P. Balasubrahmanyam, Kavita Krishnamurthy
2	"Maathadu Saku"	V. Nagendra Prasad	Gurukiran
3	"Kenchalo Manchalo"	V. Nagendra Prasad	C. Ashwath, Gururaj Hoskote, Murali Mohan, Mangala Ravi
4	"Ell Ellindavo"	Kaviraj	Anuradha Paudwal, Gurukiran
5	"Nannali Naanilla"	Kaviraj	Udit Narayan, Shamitha

== Production ==
Kariya is the debut film of Prem as a director before Excuse Me. Since the story had a gangster backdrop, director Prem and producer Anekal Balaraj bailed out 23 criminals to act in the film. Balraj tried to persuade a female mobster, Mari Mutthu, to act in the film. However, Mari Muthu who was a councilor refused the offer and claimed that the movie creates violence in society, fearing it might tarnish her reputation. Certain scenes involving these rowdies were shot in exactly the same spot where they have killed or assaulted their targets in the past. Darshan, who made his debut through the crime film Majestic was chosen to play the titular role while Abhinayasri, the daughter of actress Anuradha, was signed to play the female lead. Gurukiran has scored and composed the film's soundtrack. The cinematography was handled by Seenu.

== Release ==
Kariya received an A certificate from regional office of the Censor Board at Bangalore with the certificate dated 30 December 2002. The film was released on 3 January 2003.

== Reception ==
=== Critical reception ===
The film received mixed response from critics upon release. Gangadhara of Deccan Herald felt the film "fails to have a tight storyline" but is technically, "well-made". He added, "As the debutant director Prem fails to effectively convey the story, it gets dragged on till the end. Also, the director is quite unconvincing in giving the film a definite flow." He opined that the film had shades of Om (1995) and Darshan's own Majestic that released earlier that year. He further wrote, "Darshan looks insipid and tired throughout the film as he has neither worked on his looks nor on his expressions, which seem monotonous. Darshan could have been a bit sharper. Abhinayashri looks smarter than Darshan. She attracts a lot of attention in acting department as well as dance sequences. M R Seenu's cinematography is superb. Debutant director Prem seems to be too excited with the script as a newcomer to the medium." According to Viggy.com, "There are some catchy dialogues and comedy to make you laugh if you are freezed looking at the blood pool." Though they criticized the musical score by Gurukiran and the wrong casting of Darshan in the lead role, the film's cinematography and Prem's direction received praise. The similarities of certain scenes with that of Om and Satya were pointed out. Chitraloka criticised the film for not catering much to the women or the younger generation. But the reviewer praised Darshan's performance, Gurukiran's music and M. R. Seenu's camerawork. The film was also lauded for its technical prowess. Nettv4u gave the film 3.5 stars on 5 calling Kariya one of Darshan's best films which could draw more of his fans to theatres to watch the different effort. While the film received praise for its technical aspects, direction and cinematography the film was criticized for its violence.

== Box office ==
Kariya had a big opening. It ran for 56 days at Kapali theatre during its first release. At the end of its first run, the film was declared a sleeper hit. However, due to demand by the viewers, the film was released again when it turned out to be a greater success, enjoying a theatrical run of more than 100 days.

== Controversy ==
A line in "Kenchalo Machalo" in the second verse, called "Avalu Nanage Sigadiddare Acid Hakuve" ("If She didn't get me, I will pour acid"). forced the Karnataka State Commission for Women to ask the censor board to ban such films, claiming they encouraged crimes against women.

== Legacy ==
Despite being a gangster-based film, Kariya music scored by Gurukiran turned out to be a successful one with all five numbers hitting the top of the charts, with "Kenchalo Machalo" being a standout.

This film is regarded as one of the biggest hits and trendsetters of the Kannada film industry, and it brought lot of fame to Darshan. Audience demand has led to this being re-released in the theatres several times since its original release.

The sequel Kariya 2, which was unrelated to the 2003 film, was released in 2017. However, both films were produced by Anekal Balaraju.
