= Majestic (film) =

2002 film by P. N. Satya

- Promotional poster
- Directed by: P. N. Sathya
- Written by: P. N. Sathya
- Produced by: Ba.Ma. Harish; M.G. Ramamurthy
- Starring: Darshan; Rekha; Jai Jagadish; Harish Roy
- Cinematography: Anaji Nagaraj; M. R. Seenu
- Edited by: Nagendra Urs
- Music by: Sadhu Kokila
- Production company: Ullas Enterprises
- Release date: February 8, 2002 (India)
- Running time: 140 minutes
- Country: India
- Language: Kannada

Majestic is a 2002 Indian Kannada-language action crime thriller film written and directed by P. N. Satya in his directoral debut . The film stars Darshan in the lead role, along with Rekha and Jai Jagadish in other prominent roles. It was produced by Ullas Enterprises studio. Sadhu Kokila scored the music.

The film was released on February 8, 2002 and the movie was a superhit and it ran successfully for more than 100 days in theatres. It was the first movie for actor Darshan in the male lead. The film was remade in Telugu as Charminar (2003). The film was re released on Darshan's birthday February 16, 2022.

== Plot ==
Daasa is an orphan, raised by a corrupt policeman, Ranadheera. Daasa makes friends on the streets, and they all become gangsters when they grow up, working for Ranadheera. One day, Daasa and his gang get a job to separate two college lovers at the request of the boy's father. Daasa's gang goes to the college without Daasa to scare the girl away from the boy, but not before the girl's friend, Kiran, stands up to them and tarnishes Daasa's name. In an attempt at revenge, Daasa changes his appearance to woo Kiran and eventually breaks up with her, emotionally hurting her. To do this, Daasa takes up an alias, Prajwal. However, he falls in love with Kiran and Kiran reciprocates.

Events come to a head when it is revealed that Kiran is Ranadheera's daughther, and Ranadheera discovers that Kiran loves Daasa. Ranadheera reveals to her that Prajwal and Daasa are the same. Subsequently Kiran breaks up with Daasa, leaving him emotionally ruined. Kaveri, Ranadheera's assistant, tries to mend the relationship by revealing to Kiran her father's misdeeds and Daasa's reformed nature. As Kiran confronts her father about this, a drunk and enraged Daasa arrives and stabs Kiran, but not before Kiran reveals that she loves Daasa after discovering his true nature.

Daasa carries Kiran to the hospital, but is temporarily set back by a rival gangster, Naga. During the battle, Kiran dies. After Daasa kills Naga, Ranadheera and the rest of the police force arrive, shooting and killing Daasa. Daasa takes his last breath looking at Kiran's body in his arms.

== Cast ==
- Darshan as Prajwal alias Daasa
- Sparsha Rekha as Kiran
- Jai Jagadish as Ranadheera
- Vanitha Vasu as Kaveri
- Malathi Sardeshpande
- Harish Rai as Naga
- NGEF Ramamurthy
- Bullet Prakash
- Bank Janardhan
- Bharath Bhagavathar
- Jyothi Gurucharan
- Ramesh Pandith
- Dattaa Manjeshwar
- Sai Prakash
- Umesh Punga
- Nandesh
- Rajaram H. S.
- P. N. Sathya
- Ba. Ma. Harish

== Production ==
Darshan, son of veteran actor Thoogudeepa Srinivas, made his acting debut with this film. The film is co-produced by Ba.Ma. Harish and M.G. Ramamurthy under the banner, Ullas Enterprises

== Music ==
The music of the film was composed by Sadhu Kokila, and the lyrics were written by V. Nagendra Prasad.

Majestic

Soundtrack album by Sadhu Kokila
- Released: 2002
- Genre: Feature film soundtrack
- Label: Ashwini Audio

No.	Title	Singer(s)	Length
1.	"Muddu Manase"	Unni Krishnan
2.	"Thangali Mele"	Rajesh Krishnan, Anuradha Sriram
3.	"Naane Naane"	Rajesh Krishnan
4.	"Majestic Majestic"	Hemanth Kumar
5.	"Dove Hodiyoke"	L. N. Shastry

== Reception ==
A critic from Chitraloka.com wrote that "The gripping narration and equally wonderful performances makes this film a watchable". A critic from Sify wrote that "After seeing Majestic you feel as you had been padlocked in an airless cage while one of those honest–to-goodness unemployed guys struggles to earn a decent wage, even though he is a rowdy".

== Controversies ==
In March 2017, actor Sudeep claimed that he was instrumental in getting Darshan a chance as an actor for the film. But there are controversial split statements given by the two co-producers. Ba.Ma. Harish has agreed with Sudeep's statement, whereas co-producer M.G. Ramamurthy has cleared the air by saying Anji suggested Thoogudeepa Srinivas's son, and they finalized him as the hero at first look.
