= Pattanagere =

- suburb
- Location in Karnataka, India
- Coordinates: 13.50°N 75.99°E
- Country: India
- State: Karnataka
- District: Chikkamagaluru

Population (2001)
  - Total: 95,769

Languages
  - Official: Kannada
  - Spoken Languages: Kannada
- Time zone: UTC+5:30 (IST)
- ISO 3166 code: IN-KA
- Vehicle registration: KA
- Website: karnataka.gov.in

Pattanagere is a town and a city municipal council in Chikkamagaluru district in the Indian state of Karnataka.

== Demographics ==
As of 2001 India census, Pattanagere had a population of 95,769. Males constitute 53% of the population and females 47%. Pattanagere has an average literacy rate of 69%, higher than the national average of 59.5%: male literacy is 74%, and female literacy is 63%. In Pattanagere, 12% of the population is under 6 years of age.
