= Mr. Airavata =

2015 Indian film by A. P. Arjun

- Promotional poster
- Directed by: A. P. Arjun
- Written by: A. P. Arjun
- Produced by: Sandesh Nagaraj
- Starring: Darshan; Urvashi Rautela; Prakash Raj
- Cinematography: Shekhar Chandra
- Edited by: Deepu S. Kumar
- Music by: V. Harikrishna
- Production company: Sandesh Combines
- Distributed by: Sandesh Combines
- Release date: 1 October 2015
- Running time: 156 minutes
- Country: India
- Language: Kannada
- Budget: ₹25 crore
- Box office: ₹40 crore

Mr. Airavata is a 2015 Indian Kannada-language action film directed by A. P. Arjun and produced by Sandesh Nagaraj under Sandesh Combines. The film stars Darshan, alongside Urvashi Rautela, Prakash Raj, Anant Nag, Sithara, Bullet Prakash, Sindhu Lokanath, and Darshan's son Vineesh making his debut. The music was composed by V. Harikrishna, while cinematography and editing were handled by Shekhar Chandra and Deepu S.

== Plot ==
Airavata serves as a good police officer who works for the well-being of society. The film starts with the chief minister and IG of Karnataka coming to the house of Vitta Gowda to request that he send his grandson Airavata to duty as soon as possible.

He agrees but with favorable conditions. Outside, a reporter asks her senior the reason for such a fuss. Then the senior explains the story.

Six months earlier, Airavata had joined Bangalore police as the ACP. He brought over a big change to the crime-filled city and slowly eradicated all signs of criminal activity. He brings up new rules that serve the public without consulting higher officials and does these through his own money. These rules cause huge losses to several criminals, mostly to Prathap Kale, who immediately calls upon an enmity with Airavata. During this, a reporter Priya, falls in love with Airavata and is later shown to be the girl whom he had saved previously from an accident, hence the reason for her love. Despite this, Airavata does not reciprocate her feelings. During the preparations for a government event, Airavata is arrested by the force and is revealed to be a fake IPS officer in Karnataka. He reveals his story during an open court session.

Airavata was a farmer who had gone to Bangalore to solve the problems of a few farmers. His sister Charu gets raped by their workers when she goes to plough the fields. A corrupt cop refused to take the family's complaint, which results in Charu's suicide. Their friend Prakasa kills the inspector and is shot dead in the process. Airavata vows revenge, and when Karnataka police gives a job opening in Bangalore, Airavata gets himself posted there by the wrong means. The court declares Airavata innocent and sends him back to his village. On the request of the people, Airavata writes the civil service exam and is reposted as ACP.

Now the story comes back to the present. The reporter is curious about what will be Airavata's next move. Airavata slowly begins to take down Prathaps empire once more. He also accepts Priya's love. Towards the end, Prathap kills Vitta Gowda and his wife Sitadevi and kidnaps each and every police officer's daughters along with Priya, intending to sell them abroad. Airavata arrives in the nick of time and saves them and kills Prathap. At a felicitation ceremony, he submits his resignation form, saying that should crime rise again, then he will join the force once more. The film ends with Airavata and a child (Vineesh Darshan) saluting towards the screen.

== Cast ==
- Darshan as ACP Airavata
- Urvashi Rautela as Priya
- Prakash Raj as Prathap Kale
- Ananth Nag as Vitta Gowda
- Sithara as Sitadevi
- Vineesh Darshan
- Bullet Prakash as Prakasa
- Sindhu Lokanath as Charu
- Avinash as Commissioner
- Chikkanna as Priya's assistant
- Sadhu Kokila as Police Constable Bahubali
- Raghav Uday as Pratap Kale's henchman
- Petrol Prasanna as Pratap Kale's henchman
- Ashok
- Sanketh Kashi
- Unnathi as schoolgirl (uncredited)
- Mahek Chahal as an item number in "Ka Thalakatu" song

== Production ==
=== Development ===
In mid February 2013, producer Sandesh Nagaraj of Sandesh Combines banner, who is also a politician, announced that he would produce a film starring Darshan and selected director A. P. Arjun upon his recommendation. It was reported that Darshan liked Arjun's work in both Ambari and Addhuri besides penning down lyrics for his own film Thangigagi. It was revealed that Darshan would be playing the role of a cop and further scripting was still in the beginning stages.

The film began production on 16 February 2013 at the Kanteerava Studios in Bangalore with actor V. Ravichandran and former Chief Minister H. D. Kumaraswamy. Titled as Airavata, the film was reported to have been lavishly invested by the producer and added that the shooting would not take place in Mysore as is the usual case with Darshan's films. However, the film's proceedings went on a very slow pace owing to the busy schedules of director Arjun, and actor Darshan.

=== Casting ===
Actress Erica Fernandes was initially roped in to play the lead role opposite Darshan. She bagged this role even before the release of her maiden Kannada film Ninnindale's release. She was reportedly shuffling between the sets of this film and also Buguri simultaneously. However, due to under weight issue differences, Erica was out of the film. Reports indicated Rachita Ram would replace her for the role, which found to be untrue. Finally, Arjun finalized Urvashi Rautela through Google, where he and the producer searched India's most beautiful girl and found her name and Urvashi Rautela's pictures. Also, she was an apt choice to feature opposite Darshan because of her striking looks and great height.

Multilingual actor Prakash Raj was signed in to play the main antagonist opposite Darshan. It was also reported that Girish Karnad and Arundhati Nag would play the role of parents to Darshan's character while Bullet Prakash was also reportedly cast in an important supporting role. In early 2015, Darshan's seven-year-old son Vineesh was reportedly roped in to play a small character role alongside his father.

== Soundtrack ==
The soundtrack is composed and written by V. Harikrishna and on 16 August 2015, the film's audio was launched.

=== Track listing ===
No.	Title	Lyrics	Singer(s)	Length
1.	"Mr. Airavatha"	A.P.Arjun	K. G. Ranjith, Santhosh Venky, Chintan Vikas	04:31
2.	"There was a Ajji"	Yograj Bhat	Hemanth Kumar	04:22
3.	"Ka Thalakatu"	Yogaraj Bhat	Indu Nagaraj, V. Harikrishna	04:24
4.	"Gudi Mele"	A.P.Arjun	Shashank Sheshagiri, Sunitha S. Murali	04:01

== Release ==
Mr. Airavata was released worldwide on 1 October 2015 to mixed reviews from critics and audience.

== Reception ==
Sunayana Suresh of The Times of India gave the film two out of five stars and wrote, "Had the filmmaker woven these ingredients with even a run-of-the-mill commercial tale, the film could have scored better. Watch it if you are a die-hard Darshan fan, for he shines amid the indigestible masala." A critic from The Hindu wrote, "For Darshan’s fans, who had waited for nearly a year to watch their ‘challenging star’ on the screen, Mr. Airavata is really a feast. He sizzles on the screen in his tailor-made avatar as Mr. Airavata. But, the audience should not ask for any logic and has to watch the magic silently as both the story and the script are weak."
