= Kaatera =

2023 Kannada action film by Tharun Sudhir

- Theatrical release poster
- Directed by: Tharun Sudhir
- Screenplay by: Tharun Sudhir; Jadesh Kumar Hampi
- Dialogues by: Maasthi Upparahalli
- Story by: Tharun Sudhir; Jadesh Kumar Hampi
- Produced by: Rockline Venkatesh
- Starring: Darshan; Aradhana Ram; Jagapathi Babu; Kumar Govind
- Cinematography: Sudhakar S. Raj
- Edited by: K. M. Prakash
- Music by: V. Harikrishna
- Production company: Rockline Entertainments
- Release date: 29 December 2023
- Running time: 183 minutes
- Country: India
- Language: Kannada
- Budget: ₹45 crore
- Box office: ₹67–200 crore (Note: Bollywood Hungama gave a domestic gross figure of ₹67 crores. News18 India estimated the figures to be ₹80 crores. Deccan Herald reported its collections to be less than ₹90 crores. The Hindu and Zee Media Corporation reported the collections to be over ₹100 crores while other websites reported the collections to be ₹200 crore amidst speculation of tampering box office reports by HT Media which claimed the makers were spreading inflated numbers. However, there was a varying degree of reporting of collections since the first day. Refer "Box Office" section for details in difference between official figures announced and the trade estimates which showed discrepancies as high as 130% at the end of first week itself.)

Kaatera is a 2023 Indian Kannada-language action drama film co-written and directed by Tharun Sudhir and produced by Rockline Venkatesh. The film is inspired by a real-life incident at a village in Karnataka in the 1970s. The film stars Darshan as the titular character alongside Aradhana Ram (in her debut), Jagapathi Babu, Kumar Govind, Vinod Kumar Alwa, Shruti, and Vaijanath Biradar. The music was composed by V. Harikrishna, while the cinematography and editing were handled by Sudhakar. S. Raj and K. M. Prakash.

Principal photography began on 5 August 2022 and the shooting was done in various locations of Bangalore and Hyderabad.

Kaatera was released on 29 December 2023 and received positive reviews from critics and became the highest-grossing Kannada film of 2023 and tenth highest-grossing Kannada film of all-time.

== Plot ==
1970s: Kaatera is a blacksmith in Bheemanahalli living with his sister Kumari, brother-in-law Mahadevanna and family. Kaatera has to tackle multiple challenges to implement Land Reforms Act in order for the farmers to escape from the feudal landlords Devaraya and Kaalegowda as they are torturing the farmers to gain tax.

Prabhavathi, the daughter of Shanubogha, has been in love with Kaatera since childhood. Despite reluctance due to caste discrimination, Kaatera accepts her love and Prabhavathi leaves with Kaatera, from her arranged wedding, against her parents' wishes. Just before the marriage, Kaatera learns that Devaraya has sent 108 skilled combatants to kill him and destroy his village. Kaatera kills the combatants and returns home only to find Prabhavathi killed. An enraged Kaatera kills Devaraya for Prabhavathi's death and is imprisoned.

1989: The forensic team finds the skeletons and Reena D'Souza, the forensic officer, tells the police to begin the investigation. Reena learns from a police officer, who was among the combatants, about Kaatera's past and closes the case as natural death due to Kaatera's good nature.

Meanwhile, Mahadevanna and the villagers manage to get Kaatera released on parole. Kaatera attends the festival and meets Prabhavathi's brother Paddu. Kaatera reveals Paddu's involvement in Prabhavathi's death. Paddu reveals that he killed Prabhavathi as he was enraged about her marriage to Kaatera. Kaatera kills Paddu, thus avenging Prabhavathi's death. Kaatera urges the villagers to respect each other and eradicate caste discrimination. Kaatera pays respect to Prabhavathi and returns to prison, hoping that the villagers will change.

== Cast ==
- Darshan as Kaatera
- Aradhana Ram as Prabhavathi
- Jagapathi Babu as Devaraya
- Kumar Govind as Mahadevanna
- Vinod Kumar Alva as Kaalegowda
- Shruti as Kumari
- Vaijanath Biradar as Chongla
- Achyuth Kumar
- Danish Akhtar Saifi
- Padma Vasanthi
- Kalyani
- Master Rohit as Puttaraju
- Avinash as Shanubogha
- Srinivasa Murthy
- Shivamani
- Doddanna
- Chandra Kumar
- Ankitha Gowda
- Radha Ramachandra
- Dingri Nagaraj
- Keshav Sheelanere
- Ravi Chethan as Maara
- Shweta Prasad as Reena D'Souza
- Rangavalli Sudheer
- Arun Bachchan
- Manju Srirangapatna
- Keerthi Banu
- Chindodi Vijayakumar
- Anil Kumar
- Anekal chandru
- Sardar Sathya as Kasaba police inspector

== Production ==
=== Development and casting ===
The initial announcement of the film was made on 16 February 2022 on occasion of Darshan's birthday by Tharun Sudhir without revealing much details. The project was initially said to be produced by Umapathy Srinivas Gowda, which did not materialise. Later, Rockline Venkatesh took over the project and the announcement was made on 16 February 2022 by releasing a poster. The poster featured a dog leading a band of sheep which created a lot of buzz around the film.

Later, Jagapathi Babu was onboarded to play the antagonist role which was confirmed by the director. The team roped in Debutant Aradhana Ram, who is the daughter of actress Malashri. A year later on 26 February 2023, the makers announced the title and first look of the film, celebrating the actor's birthday. The project was titled "Kaatera", which is based on the goddess Kaateramma, famous in Karnataka. The project is being co-written by Jagadeesh Kumar Hampi of Guru Shishyaru fame. Renowned dialogue writer Maasti was brought on board. Popular actor Kumar Govind was onboarded on 17 March 2023 on his birthday by releasing a poster.

=== Filming ===
Principal photography began with a muhurta on 5 August 2022. The shooting took place in various locations of Bengaluru and Hyderabad. The film organised a press meet on 12 September 2023 in Bangalore, where it was revealed that the major portions of the film had been shot and post production works would begin shortly thereafter.

== Soundtrack ==
Kaatera

Soundtrack album by V. Harikrishna
- Released: 2023
- Recorded: 2023
- Genre: Feature film soundtrack
- Label: Anand Audio
- Producer: V. Harikrishna

V. Harikrishna, a long time and frequent collaborator of Darshan, composed the music.

No.	Title	Lyrics	Singer(s)	Length
1.	"Pasandaagavne"	Chethan Kumar	Mangli	5:42
2.	"Yaava Janumada Gelathi"	V. Nagendra Prasad	Hemanth Kumar, Rakshita Suresh	4:35
3.	"Anuragava Kalisalu"	Yogaraj Bhat	Vani Harikrishna	5:39
4.	"Punyathma"	Nagarjun Sharma	Vijay Prakash	5:23
5.	"Kaatera Theme"	Punith Arya	Aniruddha Shastry, Madhwesh Bharadwaj, Abhishek M. R., Vishak Nagalapura	5:12
Total length:				31:02

== Release ==
Initially, the producer was aiming to release the film on occasion of Dasara, which did not happen due to production delays. It is being speculated that the team are eyeing Sankranti or February 2024 release. The makers announced that the film will be releasing on 29 December 2023, through a special video. Post the film's positive reviews and collections, the makers announced that the production house is aiming for a grand overseas release, starting with Dubai. Additionally, the film is set to have theatrical run in around 9 countries including Germany, UK, the USA, Canada, and Ireland.

=== Home media ===
ZEE5 and Zee Kannada bought the digital streaming and satellite rights of the film. The film was premiered on ZEE5 on 9 February 2024.

== Reception ==
=== Critical reception ===
A. Sharadhaa of The New Indian Express gave 4/5 stars and wrote "Kaatera steers away from conventional mass formulas, and full credit should go to director Tharun Kishore Sudhir and his co-writer Jadeshaa K Hampi." Y. Maheswara Reddy of Bangalore Mirror gave 4/5 stars and wrote "It is worth a watch by all and a must for Darshan's fans."

S. Sridevi of The Times of India gave 3.5/5 stars and wrote "The movie drives home an important message while being a perfect star vehicle for Darshan. Now is a good time to say, 'Welcome back, Darshan – the performer.'" Swaroop Kadur of OTTplay gave 3.5/5 stars and wrote "'Kaatera' could have definitely benefitted from a more taut screenplay and shorter runtime, but the film is certainly worth a watch. The film doesn't mindlessly rely upon its lead actor's star status and instead attempts to drive home a message in engaging, mostly entertaining ways."

Vivek M. V. of The Hindu wrote "Despite celebrating Darshan's 'mass' appeal, 'Kaatera' doesn't lose sight of its subject, as it balances its message nearly with good dose of entertainment."

=== Box office ===
From Day 1, there have been contrasting reports with respect to box office collections officially announced by the makers and the amount estimated by the industry trackers. While Vijaya Karnataka reported that the first day collections officially announced by the makers was ₹19.79 crores, Hindustan Times cautioned that the actual figure might be only ₹9 crores as per trade. Vijayavani reported the gross first day collection to be ₹14.79 crores which was ₹5 crore equidistant from both the trade figures and official figures. OTT Play and Times of India reported the first day net collections to be ₹11 crores.

Similar to Day 1, there were varying reports with respect to Day 2 collections – while the makers announced that the two day gross was ₹37.14 crores, Deccan Chronicle pegged it at only ₹18.85 crores and Jagran estimated an even lower figure of ₹17.75 crores. The trade estimated the first weekend gross to be only ₹27.60 crore to ₹35 crore as against ₹58.08 crore declared by the makers. Similarly, at the end of first Monday, the makers declared a gross of ₹76.34 crores as against trade figure of ₹36.89 crores. Continuing with the tradition, the difference between producer figure and trade figure continued to be more than 50% even after 5 day of release – with the trade estimating the gross collection to be around ₹ 41.40 crores to ₹44 crores as against the producer figure of ₹86.84 crores. The total gross at the end of Day 6 was reported to be ₹95.36 crores. The total first week gross collections were reported to be ₹104.58 crores by the makers as against the trade estimate of only ₹45.50 crores – further widening the gap between the two figures by a staggering 130%.

The trade estimated the net collections to be ₹55.58 crores - which resulted in a whopping ₹49 crores difference between the gross figures declared and the net figures estimated. The net collections at the end of two weeks was reported to be around ₹59.90 crores to ₹65.57 crores. While the makers announced that the movie had become the highest grosser in the state with ₹190.89 crores collected in 19 days, Hindustan Times noted the huge difference between the figures declared by the makers and the amount estimated by the trackers. The makers announced the gross collections to be ₹206 crores at the end of 20 days but the tracked collections was reported to be only ₹100 crores after 22 days of its release. OTT Play speculated that the collections could have been inflated since the weekly collections and footfalls couldn't match up. A report in January 2024 called the movie the highest grosser of the year with a total collection of ₹216 crore but in mid - 2024, the collections reported by multiple sources were in total contrast - ranging from ₹200 crores to a paltry ₹25 crores. In 2025, Kantara: Chapter 1 was reported to be the only Kannada movie to earn more than Rs. 200 crore within Karnataka. News18 India estimated the figures to be ₹80 crores. Deccan Herald reported the collections to be less than ₹90 crores. However, the trade estimated the final gross to be around ₹65 crores. Reports emerged later that though the movie was the highest grosser of the year, the collections were only ₹67 crores. | box office = ₹200 crore | box office = ₹200 crore

== Awards and nominations ==
Award	Category	Recipient	Result	Ref(s)
69th Filmfare Awards South	Best Film	Rockline Venkatesh	Nominated	
69th Filmfare Awards South	Best Director	Tharun Sudhir	Nominated	
69th Filmfare Awards South	Best Actor	Darshan	Nominated	
69th Filmfare Awards South	Best Supporting Actress	Shruti	Nominated	
69th Filmfare Awards South	Best Music Director	V. Harikrishna	Nominated	
69th Filmfare Awards South	Best Playback Singer – Male	Vijay Prakash – "Punyathma"	Nominated	
69th Filmfare Awards South	Best Playback Singer – Female	Mangli – "Pasandaagavne"	Nominated	
12th South Indian International Movie Awards	Best Film	Rockline Venkatesh	Won	
12th South Indian International Movie Awards	Best Playback Singer Female	Mangli – "Pasandaagavne"	Won	
12th South Indian International Movie Awards	Best Music Director	V. Harikrishna	Won	
12th South Indian International Movie Awards	Best Debutant actress	Aradhana ram	Won	
