= Devara Maga =

- Directed by: D. Rajendra Babu
- Written by: Richard Louis (dialogues)
- Screenplay by: D. Rajendra Babu
- Story by: Mysore Harish
- Produced by: A. Ganesh; Anand B. S.
- Starring: Shiva Rajkumar; Ambareesh; Laila; Bhanupriya
- Cinematography: P. K. H. Dass
- Edited by: T. Shashikumar
- Music by: Hamsalekha
- Production company: Sri Vinayaka Movies
- Release date: 15 June 2000
- Running time: 135 minutes
- Country: India
- Language: Kannada

Devara Maga (transl. Son of God) is a 2000 Kannada-language drama film directed by D. Rajendra Babu and written by Mysore Harish. The film stars Shiva Rajkumar and Ambareesh, along with Laila and Bhanupriya in supporting roles. Darshan plays a supporting role in his only movie with Shiva Rajkumar.

The film has an original score and soundtrack composed and written by Hamsalekha. The film was a box office success.

== Cast ==
- Ambareesh as Raje Gowda
- Shiva Rajkumar as Bharatha
- Bhanupriya as Annapoorna
- Laila as Sowmya
- Srinath as Rajashekhar
- Mukhyamantri Chandru as Sidde Gowda
- Bhavyasri Rai
- Darshan as Darshan
- Tara as Sundari
- Rajashekhara Kadamba
- Junglee Prasanna
- Akki Chennabasappa
- Tulasi

== Soundtrack ==
The music was composed by Hamsalekha.

All lyrics are written by Hamsalekha.

Track listing
No.	Title	Singer(s)	Length
1.	"Bendakaloora Pakka"	S. P. Balasubrahmanyam, Anuradha Paudwal
2.	"Bharathappa Namma"	Hariharan, K. S. Chithra
3.	"Thayilla Thavarilla"	Rajesh Krishnan, K. S. Chithra
4.	"Gowdaji Gowdaji"	S. P. Balasubrahmanyam, K. S. Chithra
5.	"Manjanthe Ele"	Rajkumar
6.	"Vasantha Bhoomige"	Rajesh Krishnan, Anuradha Paudwal
7.	"Ye Belle Gowda Yedda"	S. P. Balasubrahmanyam, K. S. Chithra
8.	"Ye Nanji Ningond Kela"	Rajesh Krishnan, Manjula Gururaj

== Reception ==
A critic from Sify wrote that "Many films in tha past have come on an `orphan` as a center point...Devaramaga is one more film on those lines". A critic from indiainfo wrote that "A little more care in the technical department could have made this film an enjoyable fare".
