= Bulbul (2013 film) =

- Theatrical release poster
- Directed by: M. D. Sridhar
- Screenplay by: M. D. Shridhar
- Story by: A. Karunakaran
- Based on: Darling (Telugu)(2010)
- Produced by: Meena Thoogudeepa; Srinivas
- Starring: Darshan; Ambareesh; Rachita Ram
- Cinematography: A. V. Krishna Kumar
- Edited by: P. R. Sounder Raj
- Music by: V. Harikrishna
- Production company: Thoogudeepa Productions
- Release date: 10 May 2013
- Country: India
- Language: Kannada
- Budget: ₹ 12 crore
- Box office: ₹ 25 crore

Bulbul is a 2013 Indian Kannada-language romantic comedy film directed by M. D. Shridhar. It is a partial remake of the Telugu film Darling with the scenes in the flashback inspired from 50 First Dates. The film stars Darshan, Ambareesh and debutant Rachita Ram. The music for the film was composed by V. Harikrishna with lyrics penned by Kaviraj. The film's title is based on a song of the same name from Gaja (2008). The film released theatrically on 10 May 2013, It was the highest grossing Kannada film of 2013.

== Plot ==
Amarnath and his college friends organize a reunion after several years. Amarnath lives with his wife, Chitra and son, Vijay, who is also his closest friend. Vijay is in love with his childhood friend, Kaveri daughter of Amar's friend Vishwanath (settled in Switzerland) who doesn't show much affinity towards Vijay. Meanwhile, Vijay manages to save Nisha during a drag racing competition from a rival gang, resulting in her falling for him. However he refuses to accept her love as he considers her a good friend. Nisha attempts suicide but manages to survive. Nisha's father kidnaps Vijay's friends and in order to save them he fakes a love story. He manages to fool them by narrating the story of Kaveri, his lover who landed in a comatose state because of him (inspired by 50 First Dates).

Vijay tries hard to impress Kaveri during the reunion, but his efforts fail because of her younger brother and his father's friend Appa Rao's son, Rishi. Rishi is in the good books of Vishwanath and also has feelings for Kaveri. Meanwhile, Vijay succeeds in uniting Priya, daughter of Amar's friend Ramesh with her lover, which impresses Kaveri. Slowly, as ice starts to melt between them, Nisha realises the truth and swears to seek revenge. Rishi's friend tries to kill Vijay, resulting in Amar getting an electric shock. An angry Vijay who discovers the truth thrashes Rishi and his friends much to the agitation of Amar who asks his son to leave the house. Before leaving, his mother reveals to him that Vishwanath wishes to get Kaveri married to Rishi and knowing that Vijay's presence is a possible threat to this decision and also to consolidate their friendship Amar uses the fight as an opportunity to banish Vijay. Vijay happily accepts his father's decision and leaves the house. He comes across Kaveri who reciprocates his love. But he walks away without mentioning anything. A crestfallen Kaveri who returns to the house finds that her marriage with Rishi has been fixed. However, Kaveri proclaiming her love for Vijay refuses to accept Rishi. Vishwanath understanding his mistake decides to choose Vijay as his son-in-law. Nisha's father arrives at this occasion and kidnaps Kaveri. Amar picks up Vijay who was waiting at the bus stop and takes him to the gangster's hideout. Vijay manages to overpower them and reunite with Kaveri and his family.

== Cast ==
- Darshan as Vijay
- Ambareesh as Amarnath
- Rachita Ram as Kaveri
- Ramya Berna as Nisha
- Sharath Lohitashwa as Nisha's father
- Ashok as Vishwanath
- Tennis Krishna as Apparao
- Sadhu Kokila as Subbayya
- Sharan as Bobby
- Ramesh Bhat as Ramesha
- Sridhar Rao as Rishi
- Chitra Shenoy as Chitra
- Spoorthi as Priya
- Chikkanna as Chikka
- Haridas G.
- Bahubali
- Stunt Siddu
- Ramesh Babu

== Production ==
=== Casting ===
The producer wanted to bring back both Darshan and Ramya after 6 years, but Ramya opted out of the project. Actor Ambareesh was signed to play the father role to Darshan. Bollywood actor Pradeep Rawat was originally the main antagonist. However, he was dropped out, following a minor scuffle during the shoot and Sharath Lohitashwa was replaced instead. The film is produced by Meena Thoogudeepa Srinivas.

=== Filming ===
The official shooting of the film began on 28 December 2012 at the Bengaluru International Airport with few scenes featuring actor Pradeep Rawat at the Jade Gardens near the airport. However it was disrupted following a scuffle between the crew members and Rawat. It resumed with actor Sharath Lohitashwa replacing Rawat. Shooting also took place in Goa. On 21 February 2013, filming been completed.

== Soundtrack ==
Bulbul

Soundtrack album by V. Harikrishna
- Released: 2013
- Recorded: 2013
- Genre: Feature film soundtrack
- Length: 24:22
- Language: Kannada
- Producer: V. Harikrishna

Official audio
- Bulbul - Full Album on YouTube

All lyrics are written by Kaviraj.

Track listing
No.	Title	Singer(s)	Length
1.	"Hoo Chendu"	V. Harikrishna	4:18
2.	"Jagadalliro"	Sonu Nigam	4:07
3.	"Junior Senior"	S. P. Balasubrahmanyam, Tippu	4:08
4.	"Nille Nille"	Hemanth Kumar	4:16
5.	"Ondu Sanje"	Karthik	3:57
6.	"Nille Nille ( Reprise version)"	Tippu	4:16
Total length:			24:22

== Release ==
The film made its theatrical release across Karnataka in over 180 cinema halls on 10 May 2013.

== Reception ==
A critic from The Times of India scored the film at 4 out of 5 stars and says "Darshan for his marvellous and lively performance. Ambareesh steals the show with his graceful performance. Rachita Ram is amazing with her dialogue delivery, body language and excellent expressions. V Harikrishna has given some excellent tunes to the lyrics of Kaviraj. Krishnakumar’s cinematography is amazing". A Sharadhaa from The New Indian Express wrote "Cinematographer AV Krishna Kumar has explored good locations in Switzerland. Action by Ravi Varma needs a special mention. There could have been a little more effort at the editing desk. The Verdict: Forget the story, watch for the mass entertainment and don't miss the magic treat of Darshan and Ambareesh". B S Srivani from Deccan Herald wrote "Star just like in Veera Parampare with Sudeep — just to savour their acting prowess, but that is not to be. Was one of them underutilised here? No complaints when the Bul Bul finally makes the hero’s heart her nest". A critic from Bangalore Mirror wrote "Though the pair of Darshan and newbie Richi Ram looks out of sync in parts, the latter looks bubbly. On the flipside, the story is a bit clichéd, with too many make-believe scenes. A family entertainer, it’s definitely a big treat for Darshan fans".

== Box office ==
The makers claimed the movie crossed the collections of Saarathi and would be the first Kannada movie to gross ₹50 crores in spite of the fact that Mungaru Male had grossed ₹50 crores more than half a decade earlier. However, 6 months later, contrary to the claim made by the makers, reports emerged that the movie had grossed only ₹25 crores.
