= Daasa =

- Promotional poster
- Directed by: P. N. Sathya
- Written by: P. N. Satya
- Produced by: Ramesh Yadav
- Starring: Darshan; Amrutha; Avinash
- Cinematography: Sundarnath Suvarna
- Edited by: P. R. Soundar Raj
- Music by: Sadhu Kokila
- Production company: Royal Productions
- Release date: 21 November 2003
- Running time: 136 minutes
- Country: India
- Language: Kannada

Daasa is a 2003 Indian Kannada-language vigilante action drama film directed and written by P. N. Sathya. The film stars Darshan and Amrutha, whilst Sathyajtih and Avinash play other pivotal roles.The film featured an original score and soundtrack composed by Sadhu Kokila. The film ran for a hundred days.

== Plot ==
Dassa was a rowdy who beat his enemies and was a defender of the apple. Amutha was sister of police officer who is actually Daasa's former classmate who still had the feelings for him. Then Daasa slapped her after getting 1st rank because his shirt was torn. Actually Daasa is an intelligent fellow, but somehow become a rowdy boy. As a rowdy, he enjoyed a lot in bars and with the long and revenged their enemies who miscounduct his career life.

== Cast ==
- Darshan as Mohan Das
- Amrutha
- Sathyajith
- Avinash
- Lohitashwa
- Padma Vasanthi
- Chitra Shenoy
- Mallesh Gowda
- P. N. Sathya
- Madhugiri Prakash
- Junior Narasimharaju
- Hulivana Gangadharayya
- Apoorva
- Ramesh Pandith
- NGEF Ramamurthy
- Bank Suresh
- Bullet Prakash
- Michael Madhu

== Soundtrack ==
The music was composed by Sadhu Kokila. The song "Kulukabeda" is based on Tamil song "Sirippu Varudhu" from Tamil film Vetri Kodi Kattu.

Track listing
No.	Title	Lyrics	Singer(s)	Length
1.	"Dasanige Dil"	K. Kalyan	Hemanth
2.	"Preethisu Baa"	K. Kalyan	Rajesh Krishnan, Nanditha
3.	"Nannusire"	K. Kalyan	K. S. Chithra
4.	"Yavalappa Rani"	K. Kalyan	Rajesh Krishnan, Anuradha Sriram
5.	"Kulukabeda"	K. Kalyan	B. Jayashree, Gururaj Hoskote

== Reception ==
Chitraloka said of the film, "It is a punching and power packed performance once again from Darshan. Avinash shouts and salutes as they encounter Amar. Satyajit screams a lot and succumbs to Dasa’s strategies. Amrutha is tolerable. Songs does not deserve any mention. Cinematography is apt." A critic from indiainfo wrote that "Overall a good film".
