= Annavru =

- DVD cover
- Directed by: Om Prakash Rao
- Story by: Mani Ratnam
- Based on: Thalapathi (Tamil)
- Produced by: M. C. Dayanand
- Starring: Ambareesh; Darshan
- Cinematography: Anaji Nagaraj
- Edited by: S. Manohar
- Music by: Rajesh Ramanath
- Release date: 18 December 2003
- Running time: 135 minutes
- Country: India
- Language: Kannada

Annavru is a 2003 Indian Kannada-language crime drama film directed by Om Prakash Rao starring Ambareesh in the title role alongside Darshan, Kaniha (credited as Sravanthi), Suhasini and Sumihtra in supporting roles. The film is a remake of Mani Ratnam's Tamil film Thalapathi. The film released to positive reviews and was a box office success.

== Plot ==
On the day of the Bhogi festival, fourteen-year-old Kalyani gives birth to a boy alone and, fearing societal backlash and incapacity, abandons him inside a moving goods train. A slum dweller finds the baby, takes him home, names him Surya and raises him. The child grows up to be intolerant of injustice, especially to the poor, and wonders why his biological mother abandoned him. The only item he has from his mother is a yellow shawl that she had placed him. Amarnath, a powerful gangster called Anna (transl. Elder brother), who is kind but feared by most, fights injustice with violence. Surya attacks and kills Ramana, an auxiliary of Anna. Surya is arrested for murder and faces brutal torture from the police, but Anna bails him out after perceiving Ramana's felony and realising that Surya's cause was genuine. Surya and Anna, who share the same ideology, come to understand each other. Anna declares Surya as his Thalapathi (commander) and best friend.

Arjun, the city's new district collector, wants to lawfully end violence. He is the second son of Kalyani, who is now a doctor. After abandoning Surya, her firstborn, she married Krishnamoorthy. Kalyani never told Arjun of the ordeal she faced as a teenager but is constantly grieved by thoughts of her long-lost firstborn. Meanwhile, Surya is courted by a Brahmin girl Subbulaxmi, who is smitten with his transparent nature. Surya's appraisal of Anna leads local people in the locality to respect them both. They continue to object to societal incongruities. While Anna leads Surya to help curb unlawful discrepancies, Subbulaxmi despises Surya's use of violence and tries to persuade him against it. Anna tries to form a relationship between Subbulaxmi and Surya but Subbulaxmi's orthodox father objects and arranges her marriage to Arjun.

In his fight against organised crime, Arjun unsuccessfully targets Anna and Surya. Meanwhile, Padma, Ramana's widow, makes Surya feel guilty for killing Ramana. Understanding Padma's pain, Anna shelters her and her child. However, Padma confesses she is constantly troubled by the dishonourable men surrounding her. Anna, considering Padma and her daughter's safety and Surya's future, asks them to marry each other. Guilt-ridden, Surya marries Padma and eventually wins her child's affection. Later, at a medical camp, Kalyani meets Padma and her daughter, along with the shawl in which she wrapped Surya. After asking about the day he was found, Kalyani and Krishnamoorthy discover Surya is Kalyani's long-lost son during a suspect identification. Krishnamoorthy secretly meets Surya and reveals the truth of his origin to him. Surya asks Krishnamoorthy to promise not to let his mother know of Surya's identity because it would hurt her to know her son has grown to be a vigilante.

Kalyani eventually finds Surya and meets him. Surya vows not to harm Arjun for her sake. The long-standing feud between Anna and his main rival Kariyappa makes Surya tell Anna, who learns of his meeting with his stepfather and mother the truth about his family. Anna is pleased to know that, despite Arjun being Surya's half-brother, Surya still sides with him, thus valuing their friendship over family. Because of this, Anna decides to surrender. Anna and Surya meet Arjun, who now knows Surya is his own half-brother. Suddenly, Kariyappa's henchmen open fire and Surya is killed. Surya then lies on his mothers lap and says he is happy today as he did not get a chance to lie on his mother's lap as a baby and dies. Enraged, Anna storms into Kariyappa's house, murders Kariyappa and all of his henchmen, and surrenders to the police, but is exonerated due to lack of evidence.

== Cast ==
- Ambareesh as Amarnath a.k.a. Anna
- Darshan as Surya
- Kaniha as Subbulakshmi
- Sumithra as Surya's adopted mother
- Suhasini as Gowri
- Rajan P. Dev as Kariyappa
- Sarigama Viji
- M. N. Lakshmi Devi
- Ponnambalam as Henchman
- Anand Krishnamoorthi (reused footage from Thalapathi)

== Production ==
Darshan and Ambareesh were to reprise Rajinikanth's and Mammootty's roles from the original, respectively. It is the Kannada debut of Kaniha. The film was initially titled Dalapati but it was later changed to Annavru to please Ambareesh's fans. Ambareesh was against the name change because Annavru was used to refer to Dr. Rajkumar, but the makers of the film were insistent to not change the film back to its old title. He was also unsure if the film would complete shooting due to an incident that took place during the film's shooting. The film's ending in Kannada was changed due to Ambareesh's popularity.

== Soundtrack ==
The Soundtrack was composed by Rajesh Ramanath. Lyrics by K. Kalyan.

Song	Singers
"Kannadakkage Janana"	S. P. Balasubrahmanyam
"Nanna Jeevave"	K. S. Chithra
"Kaveriya Theeradali"	Nanditha
"Aah Mavina Thopalli"	Rajesh Krishnan, Nanditha
"Elu Bannadinda"	Badri Prasad, Nagachandrika
"Dindima Dholu Badi"	Rajesh Krishnan, Hemanth
"Mallige Maaleya"	Chorus

== Release and reception ==
The film was scheduled to release on the same day as Bisi Bisi, Gokarna and Swathi Muthu. Deccan Herald wrote "The movie has loads of action and strong emotions though sometimes you tend to get tired of watching Ambarish in fight sequences. Music by Rajesh Ramnath is good. The cinematography by Anaji Nagaraj is also amazing". The film was a box office success.
