= Bhoopathi (2007 film) =

Bhupathi
- VCD cover
- Directed by: S. Govinda
- Written by: S. Govinda
- Produced by: Kavya; Spoorthi; Shreyas
- Starring: Darshan; Sherin; Sumalatha
- Cinematography: Veenus Murthy
- Edited by: Damodar Kanasura
- Music by: V. Harikrishna
- Production company: Sri Bhuvaneshwari Chitra
- Release date: 16 February 2007
- Running time: 142 minutes
- Country: India
- Language: Kannada

Bhupathi is a 2007 Indian Kannada-language action drama film directed by S. Govinda. The film stars Darshan and Sherin, whilst K. S. Ashwath and Sumalatha play other pivotal roles. The film featured an original score and soundtrack composed by V. Harikrishna. This marks 25th film of Darshan in a lead role.

== Plot ==
Dr. Anita works in a hospital, lives a wealthy lifestyle in Bangaluru, and is the only child of the state Chief Minister, a widower. One day while rescuing a child, she herself is rescued by a male on a motorbike. She finds out that this male is Bhupathi, who lives a wealthy lifestyle in Bangaluru along with his widowed mother, paternal grandfather, sister, Jijaji, and niece. He is also a modern-day Robin Hood, referred to as 'Guru Bhai', and is feared and respected by everyone. Both continue meeting and eventually fall in love with each other. Anita is introduced to the rest of his family and all approve of her. When Bhupathi's grandfather approaches the Chief Minister to let the couple wed, he is humiliated. When Anita persists, he consents to and does meet with Bhupathi but makes it clear that he has always catered to Anita's whims and fancies, like buying her an imported car as well as a pedigreed dog, and wants Bhupathi to be added to his daughter's collection, but Bhupathi rebukes him, and the Chief Minister, together with Bhanuprasad, a member of the opposition political party, assaults Bhupathi's mother and niece, leaving Bhupathi with no choice but to seek vengeance on the Chief Minister, a move that will pit him against the system, and also alienate him from Anita.

== Cast ==
- Darshan as Bhupathi
- Sherin as Aisiri
- Sumalatha as Bhupathi's mother
- K. S. Ashwath as Bhupathi's grandfather
- Mukesh Rishi as Chief Minister Aravind Ram, Aisiri's father
- Satyaprakash as Antagonist
- Ravi Varma

== Soundtrack ==
The music was composed by V. Harikrishna.

Track listing
No.	Title	Lyrics	Singer(s)	Length
1.	"Abhi Abhi"	V. Nagendra Prasad	Kunal Ganjawala
2.	"Rukku Rukku"	Ram Narayan	Chaitra H. G., Hemanth
3.	"Theerana Theerana"	Ram Narayan	Suma Shastry
4.	"Se Se Se Nanna"	V. Nagendra Prasad	Shankar Mahadevan, Shamitha Malnad
5.	"Chandrana Thangi"	V. Nagendra Prasad	Srinivas, K. S. Chithra
6.	"San Sanana Re"	V. Nagendra Prasad	K. S. Chithra

== Release ==
Bhoopathi released on 16 February 2007 coinciding with Darshan's birthday.

== Reception ==
Sify rated the film 3/5 and noted "Harikrishna the hot sensation of Kannada music has delivered hits in two among five songs and the background score is impressive. Cinematography in the interiors is not taken care very well. On the whole, a not-to-miss film for Darshan fans". B S Srivani, reviewing for Deccan Herald, says "Watching veteran actor Ashwath is heartwarming as you witness the effort put in by this stalwart in delivering each dialogue the correct way. Sumalatha exudes calm dignity to her brief role. One wonders why Mukesh Rishi was summoned to do a poorly etched CM’s role. Shireen is there to provide the oomph. Darshan fans maybe a little disappointed though". R G Vijayasarathy reviewing for Rediff.com rated the film 2 out of 5 stars, "Bhoopathy is average fare and may appeal only to die hard Darshan fans".
