= Navagraha (film) =

2008 Indian Kannada-language heist film

- DVD cover
- Directed by: Dinakar Thoogudeepa
- Written by: A. V. Chinthan (Dialogues)
- Screenplay by: Dinakar Thoogudeepa
- Story by: Dinakar Thoogudeepa; A. V. Chinthan
- Produced by: Meena Thoogudeepa Srinivas
- Starring: Darshan
- Cinematography: A. V. Krishna Kumar
- Edited by: T. Shashi kumar
- Music by: V. Harikrishna
- Production company: Thoogudeepa Productions
- Release date: 7 November 2008
- Running time: 149 minutes
- Country: India
- Language: Kannada
- Budget: ₹5 crore

Navagraha is a 2008 Indian Kannada-language heist film directed by Dinakar Thoogudeepa. It stars Darshan in leading role. The film features an ensemble cast, including Sharmila Mandre, Dharma Keerthiraj, Vinod Prabhakar, Tharun Sudhir, Srujan Lokesh and others playing key supporting roles. The film's background and soundtrack were composed by V. Harikrishna, and the lyrics were written by V. Nagendra Prasad.

Navagraha was released on 7 November 2008 and became a commercial success. Over the years, it has achieved cult status among Kannada cinema enthusiasts.

== Plot ==
At a summit between world crime syndicates, it is proposed to steal the Ambari, a golden ceremonial object used in religious festivals, from Mysore Palace and auction it for US$500 million. Iqbal proposes that his henchman, master thief Jaggu, lead the operation, and Diwan pays bail for Jaggu who had been imprisoned for a bank heist. Jaggu's sister Gowri and friend Kumbhi bring him to Iqbal, who makes a deal with Jaggu to steal the Ambari and deliver it to Mangalore Harbour for US$20 million. Kumbhi is hesitant to join the operation, but is convinced by Gowri due to their affection for each other.

Kumbhi and Jaggu discuss the team for the heist, the latter proposing four people he had met in prison: tunnelling expert Tony, duplication experts and friends Nagi and Shetty, and getaway driver Gende. They all initially decline to take part in the heist because the Jamboo Savari festival is approaching and the Ambari is believed to be protected by the goddess Chamundeshwari, but increasing financial pressures cause them to join the team.

The team travels to Mysore and reaches their hideout. Jaggu's old colleague Kiran brings in Vicky, the son of the palace's chief security guard, who provides information about three tunnels, one of which can be used to access the Ambari when the object is to be worshipped during Ayudha Puja. Tony and Vicky check the tunnels and determine the shortest and safest route. The team then starts their heist preparations.

The team crosses the tunnel and replaces the Ambari with a fake. They take the real one and escape on a disguised bus, heading toward their destination of Mangalore Harbour. Meanwhile, the Mysore city police department appoints Assistant Commissioner Bhagath in charge of Mysore Palace security along with Vicky's best friend Sub Inspector Prathap. When the Ayudha Puja commences, Bhagath deduces that the Ambari has been stolen and begins an investigation.

Bhagath learns from a sculptor that Jaggu had replicas of the Ambari made, and deduces that he is trying to confuse the police. Bhagath claims that the replicas contain RDX explosives in order to arrest and pressure anyone found with one. Jaggu's team reach the border where he deduces Bhagath's plan and takes an alternate route, killing two police officers who become suspicious. Bhagath suspects that Vicky is involved in the heist and decides to search for him. While travelling, Kumbhi reveals to Jaggu that he knows Jaggu plans to double-cross the others by killing them, and reveals that he changed the password to the account Iqbal will use to pay them.

The group rests on a hill while repairing a flat tire. Kumbhi gives Gowri a pendrive which contains the heist plan, bank account number and password. Jaggu kills Kumbhi and incapacitates Gowri, gaining the pendrive, and decides to continue their journey. Vicky learns that Kiran has been using him all along, and has feelings for Jaggu instead of for himself. Devastated about Kumbhi's death, Gowri commits suicide by jumping from the bus. Tony realizes that Jaggu cannot be trusted and holds Gende at gunpoint to stop the bus, resulting in a Mexican standoff between the remaining group members. Vicky calls Prathap and reveals the Ambari's location before Kiran threatens Vicky at gunpoint.

The bus stops in a dense wilderness and a fight erupts in which everyone is killed except for Jaggu and Vicky. Jaggu beats Vicky and resumes the bus journey. Bhagath and his team shoot the bus, which crashes partway over the side of a bridge. Bhagath ties a rope to the Ambari which is lifted away by a police helicopter. Bhagath takes Vicky and jumps from the bus, which tips over and crashes down a chasm, killing Jaggu.

At the Vijayadashami festival, the Ambari is reinstated and the Jamboo Savari is celebrated. Vicky decides to work hard in the future.

== Cast ==
- Darshan as Jaggu
- Sharmila Mandre as Kiran
- Dharma Keerthiraj as Vicky
- Vinod Prabhakar as Tony
- Srujan Lokesh as Gende
- Tharun Kishore Sudhir as Kumbhi
- Varsha as Gowri
- Nagendra Urs as Naagi
- Giri Dinesh as Shetty
- Sourav as ACP Bhagath
- Kuri Prathap as Sub-inspector Prathap
- Mohan Juneja as Nagi and Shetty's client
- Malavalli Saikrishna
- Vikram Udaykumar as Police Commissioner
- Ravindranath
- Krishne Gowda
- Bank Suresh
- Vinod Varadaraj
- Ravi Varma

== Production ==
Adi Lokesh was approached for a villainous role but declined due to financial reasons.

== Soundtrack ==
Song	Lyricist	Artist	Duration
"Yaami Yaami"	V. Nagendra Prasad	Kunal Ganjawala	4:29
"Kan Kan Salige"	V. Nagendra Prasad	Sonu Nigam	4:34
"Ambari Oorinalli"	V. Nagendra Prasad	Soumya Mahadevan, Sonu Nigam	5:28
"Naramanasa"	V. Nagendra Prasad	Hariharan	4:32
"Smileo Re"	V. Nagendra Prasad	Jassie Gift, Tippu, Sonu Nigam, Karthik, Adarsh Aryan, Chaitra H. G.	4:20

== Reception ==
=== Critical response ===
R. G. Vijayasarathy of Rediff.com scored the film at 4 out of 5 stars, credited Darshan for playing a less-than-heroic character and allowing less-recognizable actors to take leading roles, and praised the performances of Keerthiraj, Prabhakar, and Lokesh. A critic from Bangalore Mirror wrote that, in spite of the film's narrative and performance inconsistencies, it is "watchable ... for the novelty it brings to monoton[ous] Kannada films". A critic from The New Indian Express felt that fans might not appreciate Darshan's departure from heroic roles, and that the film lacked a strong villain.

== Re-release ==
The film was re-released on 7 November 2024 in 100 theatres throughout Karnataka, grossing ₹68 lakh during its re-run.

== See also ==
- Maha Prachandaru – a 1981 Kannada heist film about the theft of an idol from a temple.
