= Dharma (2004 film) =

2004 film by K. V. Chandrakanth

- VCD cover
- Directed by: K. V. Chandrakanth
- Written by: K. V. Chandrakanth; V. Nagendra Prasad
- Produced by: M. G. Ramamurthy
- Starring: Darshan; Sindhu Menon; Manisha
- Cinematography: Sundarnath Suvarna
- Music by: Hamsalekha
- Production company: Vasushree Productions
- Release date: 5 March 2004
- Running time: 149 minutes
- Country: India
- Language: Kannada

Dharma is a 2004 Indian Kannada-language action drama film written and directed by K. V. Chandrakanth starring Darshan, Sindhu Menon and Manisha. The film has musical score by Hamsalekha. The film was released on 5 March 2004.

== Cast ==
- Darshan as Dharma
- Sindhu Menon as Kavya
- Manisha
- Doddanna
- Rangayana Raghu
- Jai Jagadish
- Ramesh Pandith
- Harish Rai
- Bhagath Bhagavathar

== Production ==
The film was launched at Thirumalagiri Venkateswara Temple at Bangalore on 10 October 2003. Jennifer, credited as Manisha was signed in to play the second heroine, having worked in a few Tamil films prior to this, under the pseudonym of Nanditha. K. V. Chandrakanth, who worked as an assistant to P. Vasu, made his directional debut. Hamsalekha scored the soundtrack while cinematography was handled by Sundarnath Suvarna. Jai Jagadish, Doddanna, Rangayana Raghu, Harish Rai, Bhagath Bhaagavathar and Ramesh Pandith portrayed several supporting characters in the film. The film was shot in Mysore, Ooty, Bangalore and Goa.

== Themes ==
According to writer-director K. V. Chandrakanth, the central character Dharma enacted by Darshan Thoogudeep is an uncultured rowdy. The film marks his transition from a thug to a poet thus proving that the pen is mightier than a sword. Also the character of Dharma and his transition is similar to the life of Valmiki and his evolution from a barbarian to a poet.

== Soundtrack ==
Soundtrack was composed by Hamsalekha.

1. "Hrudaya Nin Impada" by Divya and Chethan
2. "Kavya Amrutha" by S. P. Balasubrahmanyam
3. "Nam Hero Barthan" by Hemanth Kumar
4. "Meghashyama Baa" by Rajesh Krishnan and Nanditha
5. "Readina" by Hemanth
6. "Shocku Shocku" by Malgudi Subha

== Critical reception ==
A critic from indiainfo.com wrote that "The film has everything that could have made it successful. But everything is in the wrong quantity and Director K V Chandranath has failed in giving us wholesome entertainment". S. N. Deepak of Deccan Herald called it a film for action film lovers and Darshan's fans.
