= Kalasipalya (film) =

2004 Indian Kannada action crime film

- DVD cover
- Directed by: Om Prakash Rao
- Written by: Om Prakash Rao; K. V. Raju (Dialogues)
- Produced by: Ramu
- Starring: Darshan; Rakshita
- Cinematography: Anaji Nagaraj
- Edited by: S. Manohar
- Music by: Sadhu Kokila; Venkat-Narayan
- Production company: Ramu Films
- Distributed by: Ramu Enterprises
- Release date: 15 October 2004
- Running time: 150 minutes
- Country: India
- Language: Kannada

Kalasipalya is a 2004 Indian Kannada-language action crime film directed by Om Prakash Rao and produced by Ramu under Ramu Films banner. The film stars Darshan and Rakshita in the leading roles. Venkat-Narayan and Sadhu Kokila scored for the film's background and its soundtrack.

Om Prakash Rao had revealed that he had copied scenes from 7 films predominantly comedy sequences from the Tamil film Dhool.

== Plot ==
Kencha is a localite in Kalasipalya who spends time playing cricket, getting into fights, and has a group of friends, Gilli, Prakash and Raju. Kencha lives with his father Seetharam, mother Janaki and sister Anitha. Seetharam berates Kencha for not completing his SSLC examination and not having an aim in life. Kencha meets his neighbour Priya, who falls in love with him.

Meanwhile, Kalasipalya is ruled by gangsters Kota Prabhakar, Munna Bhai and his brother Jaleel. Munna Bhai and Jaleel use their syndicate network to support their mentor MLA Krishnappa. Kencha thrashes Kota Prabhakar and his henchman when they threaten to pour acid on Anitha. On election day, Kencha thrashes Jaleel when he threatens everyone to vote for Krishnappa and also harasses Priya. Munna Bhai finds out and creates a ruckus at Kencha's house, causing Kencha to withdraw a complaint. Kencha decides to start an eatery business with his friends, where his parents are happy about his decision and extend their support.

The eatery business seems to be working out well until Jaleel and his men start visiting their stall. Jaleel and his drunken men continuously visit the stall and abuse Gilli. Kencha tells him not to get involved in any argument with them. One night, Jaleel beats up Gilli badly, where Kencha accidentally kills Jaleel and goes into hiding with his friends. An angered Munna Bhai barges into Kencha's house where he kills Seetharam, Janaki and Anitha. Enraged, Kencha goes to Munna Bhai's liquor factory and a fight erupts where Kencha is stabbed by Munna Bhai and SI Karunakar, where he is thrown in a lake.

Gilli, Prakash, Raju and Priya find Kencha and get him treated at Arya Vaidya Sala. Kencha survives and plans to eliminate the terror of Munna Bhai, where he along with his friends kills Karunakar and Krishnappa, whose death is witnessed by the police commissioner. Kencha and his friends goes to Munna Bhai's liquor factory and kill the henchmen. Kencha chases Munna Bhai and brutally kills him, thus ending his terror and avenging his family's death. Kencha surrenders to the commissioner, but is not arrested as he had killed only gangsters. In the aftermath, Kencha and his friends form a vigilante group in order to punish the gangsters.

== Cast ==
- Darshan as Kencha
- Rakshita as Priya
- Ananthavelu as MLA Krishnappa
- Mohan Raj as Munna Bhai
- G. V. Sudhakar Naidu as Jaleel, Munna Bhai's brother
- Rajashekhar Kotian as SI Karunakar
- Avinash as Seetharam, Kencha's father
- Chitra Shenoy as Janaki, Kencha's mother
- Anitha as Anitha, Kencha's sister
- Raju Ananthaswamy, Kencha's friend
- Sadhu Kokila as Jacky
- Bullet Prakash as Govinda
- Ramesh Bhat as Priya's father
- Shailaja Joshi as Priya's mother
- Sunitha Shetty
- Kote Prabhakar as Kota Prabhakar
- M. N. Lakshmi Devi
- Tharakesh Patel as Gilli
- Sai Prakash
- Kempe Gowda
- Srinivas Murthy as police commissioner
- Stunt Siddu
- John
- Ramesh Pandith
- Escorts Srinivas
- Badri Narayan
- Guru Murthy
- Venkata Rao
- Ramesh Babu
- Srinivas Prabhu

== Soundtrack ==
The soundtrack and background score were composed and scored by Venkat-Narayan and Sadhu Kokila. The song "Suntaragaali" was recreated from the Tamil song "Manmatha Rasa" from the film Thiruda Thirudi.

Sl No	Song title	Singer(s)	Lyricist
1	"Dhool Maga Dhool"	Shankar Mahadevan	Thangali Natraju
2	"Kencha O Kencha"	Rajesh Krishnan, Nanditha	K. Kalyan
3	"Pete Pete Rap"	Udit Narayan	Thangali Natraju
4	"Theete Subba"	Malgudi Subha	Thangali Natraju
5	"Suntara Gaali"	Rajesh Krishnan, Malathi	K. Kalyan

== Release ==
Kalasipalya was released on 15 October 2004 and became a commercial success at the box office. In 2008, it was dubbed in Hindi as Kalasi Palya Junction.

== Reception ==
Indiaglitz wrote "Director Om Prakash Rao has a formula for making a commercial film. Rather than working hard on a story and a script, he lifts some sequences from here and there and makes a hotchpotch with a loose script and a thin story. Kalasipalya is one such film." Sify wrote "Darshan performance is nothing much to write about as he has repeated what he had done so far. Rakshita is wasted in an insipid role while the rest of the cast are just ok. Songs are very average and on the whole the film is disappointing". S. N. Deepak of Deccan Herald wrote "However, the story is not new. The director has tried to depict some real life situations like the cricket match and sentimental family scenes. Some of the dialogues have been edited. The film has some violence and murder scenes".

== Box office ==
The director claimed that the producer had informed him the movie had grossed around ₹18–22 crores.
