= V. Nagendra Prasad =

Indian lyricist

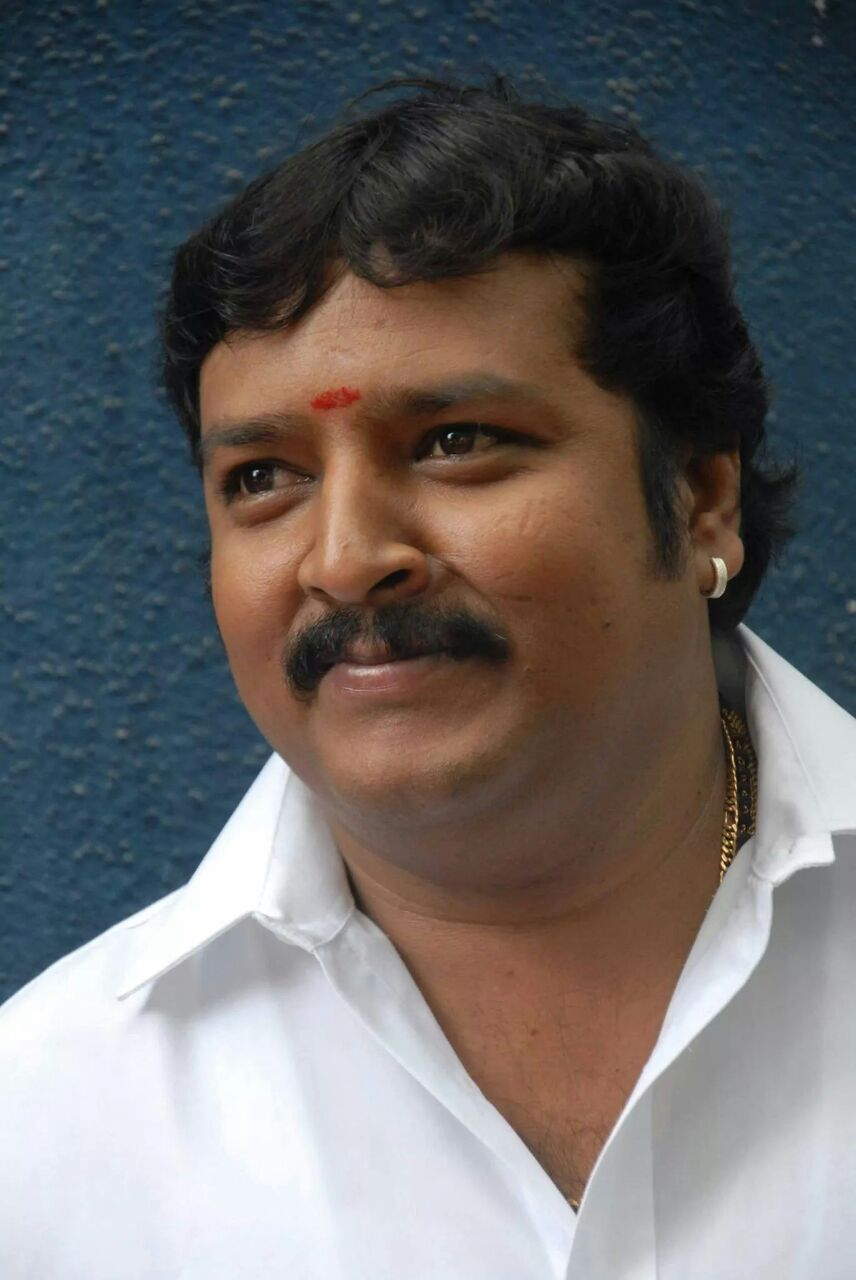
- Born: 3 December 1975 (age 50); Ijjala Ghatta, Nagamangala, Mandya, Karnataka, India
- Education: Mysore University
- Occupations: Actor, Composer, Film Director, Lyricist, Dramatist, Dialogue writer
- Years active: 1994–present
- Spouse: Yamuna Prasad
- Children: Utsav Prasad, Riya Archana
- Parents: M. V. Venkataramanappa (father); Chandramma (mother)
- Awards: Karnataka State Film Awards; Filmfare Awards South; Best Director award from SIFFA

V. Nagendra Prasad (born 3 December 1975) is an Indian lyricist, filmmaker, and actor known for his work in Kannada cinema. Over a career spanning more than two decades, he has written lyrics for over 3,000 songs across 1,000 films and numerous devotional and television projects. He is a recipient of multiple Filmfare Awards South and the Karnataka State Film Award.

== Early life ==
Prasad was born in Ijjala Ghatta, Mandya district, Karnataka, to M. V. Venkataramanappa and Chandramma. He attended school in Doddaballapura before pursuing higher education at Mysore University, where he earned a Master’s degree in Kannada Literature. In 2021, he was awarded a Doctor of Literature (D.Litt) by Hampi University for his research thesis titled "The Social Effect of Kannada Cinema Songs.

== Career ==
Lyricist and Dialogue Writer

Nagendra Prasad entered the film industry as a lyricist with the film Gajina Mane (2000). He gained early recognition for his work as a dialogue writer in the supernatural film Sri Manjunatha (2001). He has since collaborated with prominent music composers such as Hamsalekha, V. Harikrishna, and Arjun Janya. His notable songs include "Appa I Love You" (Chowka), "Dwapara" (Krishnam Pranaya Sakhi), and "Salam Rocky Bhai" (K.G.F: Chapter 1).

=== Direction and Acting ===
He made his directorial debut in 2004 with Nalla, starring Sudeep. He subsequently directed films such as Ambi(2006) and Googal (2018). Prasad has also appeared as an actor, making his debut in a lead role in Googal and later starring in Guruji

=== Notable songs ===
Film	Song
Sri Manjunatha	Obane obane manjunathanobane
Premakke Sai	Anda nin hesara
Dhumm	Ee touchalli yeno idhe
Dhruva	Dina heege ninne naa
Nandhi	Nakara gikara beda / Kadala dati bandha
Majestic	Mudhu manase peddu manase / (all songs)
Kariya	Kenchalo manchalo
Excuse Me	Brahma vishnu shiva / Preethse antha prana / (all songs)
Abhi	Bitaku guru feel
Sri Ram	Yella nine thaye
Swathi Muthu	Sri chakradhari ge / (all songs)
Ranga SSLC	Manase Thank you / Oora kannu / (all songs)
Nalla	Huchu preethi / Malage malage / (all songs)
Apthamithra	Pata pata haro galipata
Shastri	Sumne sumne sumne takararu / (all songs)
Vishnu Sena	Meghave meghave
Ambi	Hey hrudhaya / (all songs)
Dattha	Baare baare
Jothe Jotheyali	Oo Gunavantha / (all songs)
Duniya	Kariya I LOVE YOU / Nodaiyya kotte
Milana	Kadhu kadhu nodo
Gaja	Aaithalakadi / Maathu nanollu
Vamshi	Bhuvanam gaganam
Payana	Modadha Ollage / Manasa Gange (all songs)
Navagraha	Kann kanna salige / (all songs)
Raaj the Showman	Muthuraja / Soorya nina / Hey paru
Porki	Sakathagavle sumne nagthale
Modalasala	Prathama prathama
Sathya	Hutu yeradakshara / (state award)
Kempegowda	Shankar shashidhara / Geleyane
Hudugaru	Shambo shiva / Yen chandane hudugi
Vinayaka Geleyara Balaga	Yarivalli hudugi / (all songs)
Saarathi	Athiratha maharatha / (all songs)
Vishnuvardhana	123 Vishnuvardhana / Yedheyolage
Rambo	Mane tanka bare mane tanka
Kalpana	Bandalo bandalo nodu
Prem Adda	Kalli ivalu
Yaare Koogadali	Yarivano / Kempadho / Galliyalli
Gombegala Love	"Premave Jeeva"
Brindavana	Bellam belaga
Bhajarangi	Jai bajarangi / Sri krishna
Madarangi	Darling Darling
Shravani Subramanya	Kannale Kann Ittu
Rose	Yenla badadhe maige / (all songs)
Adyaksha	Adyaksha adyaksha
Ambareesha	Kannali bachidala / (all songs) / (Filmfare Award)
Ond Chance Kodi	"Haaduva Premaraagadali"
Ranna	Gabhar Sherr
Vajrakaya	Vajrakaya
Muddu Manase	Eydeyal yaro gazal / (state award)
Kotigobba 2	Saaluthilave / Parapancha nine / (all songs)
Mukunda Murari	Neene Rama Neene Shama
Chowka	Appa I Love You / (Filmfare Award)
Chakravarthi	Ondhu malebillu / Chakravarthi
Anjani Putra	1234 Shille Hodi
Bangara s/o Bangarada Manushya	Ondanondhu oorali
Tagaru	Tagaru banthu tagaru
Amma I Love You	Amma nannee januma
Naduve Antaravirali	Shakunthle sikkallu
K.G.F: Chapter 1	Salaam Rocky Bhai
Kavacha	Rekheya Khudre yeri
Kurukshetra	All songs
Pailwaan	All songs
Banaras	Maaya Gange / Belakina Kavithe
Kranti	Dharani, The Theme Song
Kaatera	Yaava Janumada Gelathi
Krishnam Pranaya Sakhi	Dwapara / Hey Gagana / Sri Krishnam
Bhairathi Ranagal	Agnyaathavaasa
Vaamana	Muddu Raakshasi
Marco	Blood / Asuran

=== Music director ===
Film	Year	Actors	Ref.
Ambi	2006	Aditya, Manya, Shobaraj, Kishore, Bullet Prakash, Chitra Shenoy, Shankar	
Shishya	2006	Deepak, Chaitra, Rangayana Raghu, Padma Vasanthi, Pramila Josai, Yashi Ramesh	
Googal	2018	V. Nagendra Prasad, Shubha Punja, Deepak, Amrutha Rao, Shobaraj, Muni	

=== Dialogue writer ===
- Sri Manjunatha (2001)
- Romeo Juliet (2002)
- Swathi Muthu (2003)
- Dharma (2004)
- Shivalinga (2016)
- Rogue (2017)
- Muniratna Kurukshetra (2019)

=== Director ===
Year	Film	Ref.
2004	Nalla	
2006	Ambi	
2009	Meghave Meghave	
2011	Vinayaka Geleyara Balaga	
2018	Googal	

=== Awards and nominations ===
Partial list of awards.

Ceremony	Category	Film	Song (if applies)	Result	Ref
Udaya Film Awards	Best Lyricist 2007 – Kannada	Duniya	"Kariya I Love U"	Won	
2009–10 Karnataka State Film Awards	Best Lyricist	Sathya	"Akshara Akshara Eradakshara"	Won	
2014 Santosham Film Awards	Best Lyricist – Kannada	Shravani Subramanya	"Kannalle Kannittu"	Won	
2015 Karnataka State Film Awards	Best Lyricist	Muddu Manase	"Edeyal Yaro Ghazal"	Won	
62nd Filmfare Awards South	Best Lyricist – Kannada	Ambareesha	"Kannalli"	Won	
65th Filmfare Awards South	Best Lyricist – Kannada	Chowka	"Appa I Love You"	Won	
Mirchi Music Awards South	Best Lyricist Award 2017	Chowka	"Appa I Love You"	Won	
Zee Kannada	Hemmeya Kannadiga-2017	Chowka	"Appa I Love You"	Won	
2018 Zee Kannada Awards	Hemmeya Kannadiga	KGF: Chapter 1	"Salam Rocky Bhai"	Won	
Chittara Star Awards	Best Lyricist – Kannada	Krishnam Pranaya Sakhi	'"Dwapara"	Won	
