= Bullet Prakash =

Indian actor (1976 - 2020)

- Born: Prakash; 2 April 1976; Bangalore, India
- Died: 6 April 2020 (aged 44); Bangalore, India
- Occupations: Actor, politician
- Years active: 1991; 1999–2020
- Political party: Bharatiya Janata Party
- Spouse: Manjula
- Children: 2

Bullet Prakash (2 April 1976 – 6 April 2020) was an Indian actor who worked in Kannada cinema. Known for portraying comic roles, Prakash appeared in over 325 films. He earned the nickname "Bullet" because he used to ride the motorbike, Royal Enfield Bullet. In 2015, Prakash joined the Bharatiya Janata Party.

Prakash appeared in films such as Mast Maja Maadi (2008), Aithalakkadi (2010), Mallikarjuna (2011) and Aryan (2014). He also appeared in a Tulu film, Soombe.

== Partial filmography ==
- Shanti Kranti (1991) (child artist)
- A. K. 47 (1999)
- A. K. 47 (1999) (Telugu)
- Huchcha (2001) (uncredited)
- Yuvaraja (2001)...Raju's friend
- Dhruva (2002)
- Ekangi (2002)
- Don (2003)
- Daasa (2003)
- Partha (2003)
- Bidalaare (2004)...car driver
- Omkara (2004)
- Ambi (2006)
- Shree (2006)
- Baa Bega Chandamama (2008)
- Kodagana Koli Nungitha (2008)
- Mast Maja Maadi (2008)
- Venki (2009)
- Ee Sambhashane (2009)
- Aithalakkadi (2010)
- Lift Kodla (2010)
- Jackie (2010)
- Mallikarjuna (2011)
- Sri Kshetra Adi Chunchanagiri (2012)
- Devarane (2013)
- Rajani Kantha (2013)
- Parari (2013)
- Jataayu (2013)
- Shatru (2013)
- Jungle Jackie (2013)
- Dhanu (2013)
- Khatarnak (2013)
- Karnataka Ayodhyapuram (2013)
- Savaal (2014)
- Love Show (2014)
- Manada Mareyalli (2014)
- Nimbe Huli (2014)
- Pungi Daasa (2014)
- Rose (2014)
- Aryan (2014)
- Tirupathi Express (2014)
- Master Mind (2015)
- Rhaatee (2015) ... Jagganna
- Just Maduveli (2015)
- Daksha (2015)
- Bombay Mittai (2015)
- Patharagitthi (2015)
- Red Alert (2015)
- Male (2015)
- Luv U Alia (2015)
- Mr. Airavata (2015)
- Ganga (2015)
- Bettanagere (2015)
- Octopus (2015)
- Alone (2015)
- Karaioram (2016) (Tamil)
- Kathe Chitrakathe Nirdeshana Puttanna (2016)
- Maduveya Mamatheya Kareyole (2016)
- Bheeshma (2016)
- Akira (2016)
- Jaggu Dada (2016)
- Mumbai (2017)
- Jalsa (2017)
- Soundarya Nilaya (2017)
- Saheba (2017)
- Mari Tiger (2018)
- Rajasimha (2018)
- Bhootayyana Mommaga Ayyu (2018)
- Ibbaru B.Tech Students Journey (2019)
- Jerk (2019)
- Pogaru (2021)
- Gaalipata 2 (2022)

== Death ==
Prakash died on 6 April 2020 at the age of 44 due to acute liver failure and kidney failure.
