= List of Kannada films of 2003 =

The following is a list of films produced in the Kannada film industry in India in 2003, presented in alphabetical order. A total of 99 films were released that year, 12 of which were said to be remakes. The Hindu called 2003 a "flop for Kannada cinema", with an investment of ₹47 crore returning only ₹11.20 crore. The report stated that only 11 films "brought substantial returns to the investors." They included Kariya, Kutumba, Raktha Kanneeru, Preethi Prema Pranaya, Excuse Me, Chandra Chakori, Khushi, Laali Haadu, Sri Ram and Don.

== Top-grossing films ==
| Rank | Title | Collection | Ref. |
|---|---|---|---|
| 1. | Raktha Kanneeru | ₹15 crore (₹57.75 crore in 2025) | |
| 2. | Kariya | ₹7.5 crore (₹28.875 crore in 2025) | |
| 3. | Sri Ram | ₹6 crore (₹23.1 crore in 2025) | |
| 4. | Kutumba | ₹5 crore (₹19.25 crore in 2025) | |
| 5. | Laali Haadu | ₹3 crore (₹11.55 crore in 2025) | |
| 6. | Don | ₹2.5 crore (₹9.63 crore in 2025) | |
| 7. | Chandra Chakori | ₹2.25 crore (₹8.667 crore in 2025) | |
| 8. | Preethi Prema Pranaya | ₹2 crore (₹7.7 crore in 2025) | |
| 9. | Excuse Me | ₹1 crore (₹3.85 crore in 2025) | |
| 10. | Khushi | ₹50 lakh (₹1.93 crore in 2025) | |

== List of Kannada film released ==
=== January - June ===
| Month | Title | Director | Cast | Music director | Notes |
|---|---|---|---|---|---|
| January | Kariya | Prem | Darshan, Abhinayasri, B. Jayashree | Gurukiran | |
| January | Dumbee | Adarsh | Adarsh, Rashmi, Shilpa, Hema Bellur, Tennis Krishna | Hamsalekha | |
| January | Daali | Eeshwar Balegundi | Vinod Alva, Shobhraj, Thulasi Ram, Anitha S Nayar | Kumar Eshwar | |
| January | Sri Kalikamba | Rama Narayanan | Ramya Krishnan, Anu Prabhakar, Vinod Kumar Alva, Jayanthi | Deva | A Kannada–Tamil bilingual film |
| January | Don | P. N. Sathya | Shiva Rajkumar, Meghana Naidu, Ashok, Jai Jagadish | Sadhu Kokila | |
| January | Laali Haadu | H. Vasu | Darshan, Abhirami, Ruthika, Umashree | Sadhu Kokila | |
| January | Jaya | N. Srinivas | Jeevan, Aishwarya, Ashok | Ram – Suchithra | |
| January | Pakka Chukka | S. Narayan | Ramesh Aravind, S. Narayan, Ruchita Prasad, Mahalakshmi | S. Narayan | |
| January | Lovva Illa Dovva | S. Nanda Kumar | Anirudh, Mithuna | K. Kalyan | |
| January | Heart Beats | S K Nagendra Urs | Vijay Raghavendra, Ashitha, Deepa | Venkat-Narayan | |
| February | Neenandre Ishta | B. Mallesh | Darshan, Harish Raj, Malavika, Akhila | Bharadwaj | |
| February | Border | Anand P. Raju | Charanraj, Shobharaj, Vinod Kumar Alva, Sneha, Pavithra Lokesh | M. N. Krupakar | |
| February | Sacchi | Om Prakash Rao | Om Prakash Rao, Navya, Lohithaswa | Gurukiran | |
| February | Ananda | Varamulla Pudi | Naveen Mayur, Ruthika, Rajesh Nataranga, Jhansi Subbaiah, Ananth Nag | Rajesh Ramanath | Remake of Telugu film Anandam |
| February | Mooru Manasu Nooru Kanasu | B. Hanumanthu | Prema, Harindranath, Rajesh, Ramesh Bhat, Bank Janardhan | Chaitanya | |
| February | Bangalore Bandh | Teshi Venkatesh | Sai Kumar, Ananth Nag, Deepthi, Avinash, Doddanna | Hamsalekha | |
| February | Adu | Ravi Padmarag M. A. | Ravi Padmarag, Anitha, M. P. Shankar | Sunil Dev, Raj Dev | |
| February | Badri | Raghuvardhan | C P Yogeshwar, Kausalya, Sudharani, Harish Rai | Rajesh Ramanath | |
| February | Nagabharana | Bellary Janardhan | Shobharaj, Srividya, Roopashree, Doddanna | Chaitanya | |
| March | Hey Nan Bheeshma Kano | Surya | Devaraj, Prema, Tara, Pramod Chakravarthy | Chaitanya | |
| March | Gandhinagara | Lakki Shankar | Rajendra, Kausalya | Layendra Kokila | |
| March | Colors | Ramesh P. C. | Mandya Ramesh, Nivas, Janhavi, Bank Janardhan, Tennis Krishna | Colors Mahesh | |
| March | Wrong Number | N. S. Shankar | Harish Mattur, Bhavana | V. Manohar | |
| March | Raja Narasimha | Muthyal Subbaiah | Vishnuvardhan, Ramya Krishnan, Raasi, Abhijeeth, Avinash | Deva | |
| March | Nimma Preethiya Huduga | K. V. Jayaram | Vinod Kumar Alva, Ashok, Vinaya Prasad, Sadhu Kokila | S. P. Venkatesh | |
| March | Nanna Hendthi Maduve | M. S. Rajashekar | Sa. Ra. Govindu, Om Prakash Rao, Anu Prabhakar, Ruthika | Rajesh Ramanath | Remake of Hindi film Meri Biwi Ki Shaadi |
| March | Katthegalu Saar Katthegalu | Rajendra Singh Babu | S. Narayan, Ramesh Aravind, Mohan Shankar, Ruthika, Meghana Naidu | Hamsalekha | |
| April | Hello | Kodlu Ramakrishna | Bhavana, Naveen Mayur | Srishaila | |
| April | Yardo Duddu Yallammana Jathre | A. R. Babu | Jaggesh, Devaraj, Amrutha, Bank Janardhan | V. Manohar | Remake of Malayalam film Sanmanassullavarkku Samadhanam |
| April | Devara Makkalu | Srinivasa Murthy | Nitil Krishna, Srinivasa Murthy, Doddanna, Mukhyamantri Chandru, Ramesh Pandit, Malavika Avinash, Lamboo Nagesh | Hamsalekha | |
| April | Kiccha | Arun Prasad | Sudeep, Shwetha, Ajay Rao, Sujatha | Hamsalekha | |
| April | Kutumba | Naganna | Upendra, Natanya Singh, Gurukiran, Sathyaraj | Gurukiran | |
| April | Paris Pranaya | Nagathihalli Chandrashekar | Raghu Mukherjee, Minal Patel, Rajesh | Stephen Prayog | |
| April | Singaaravva | T. S. Nagabharana | Prema, Avinash, Shivadwaj | C. Ashwath | |
| April | Abhi | Dinesh Babu | Puneeth Rajkumar, Ramya | Gurukiran | |
| May | Nenilde Naanu... Illa Kane... | Srishyla | Shivadwaj, Anu Prabhakar, Dwarakish | Srishyla | |
| May | Kushalave Kshemave | S. Mahendar | Ramesh Aravind, Divya Unni, Darshan, Ramkumar | Rajesh Ramanath | Remake of Tamil film Kaalamellam Kadhal Vaazhga |
| May | Preetisle Beku | Yogesh Hunsur | Vijay Raghavendra, Chaya Singh | Chaitanya | Remake of Hindi film Pyaar To Hona Hi Tha |
| May | Taayi Illada Tabbali | Om Sai Prakash | Shivadhwaj, Radhika, Srinivasa Murthy, Avinash, Sadhu Kokila | Hamsalekha | |
| May | Ramaswamy Krishnaswamy | P. Annayya | Mohan Shankar, Naveen Mayur, Sargam | Hamsalekha | |
| May | Lankesh Patrike | Indrajit Lankesh | Darshan, Vasundhara Das, Ananth Nag, Aditi Govitrikar, Rangayana Raghu, Devaraj, Chitra Shenoy | Babji - Sandeep | |
| May | Black & White | Jaikumar N Palani K | Rajesh Ramanath, Priya Hassan, Sathish, Jayanthi | Rajesh Ramanath | |
| May | Tada Khaidi | Shivaji Gorpade | Devaraj, Thriller Manju, Padmini | Rajesh Ramanath | |
| May | Meese Chiguridaaga | K. Praveen Nayak | Theja, Durga Shetty, Shree, Thusha Pande | M. N. Krupakar | |
| May | Fifty : Fifty | Surya | Shyam Kumar, Pooja, Dwarakish, Srinath | Rajesh Ramanath | |
| June | Sri Ram | M. S. Ramesh | Shiva Rajkumar, Abhirami, Ankitha, Jai Jagadish | Gurukiran | |
| June | Ooh La La | Hemanth Hegde | Krishna Mohan, Radhika Kumaraswamy, Arya Prasad, Sonia Agarwal | Suresh Devkumar | |
| June | Ananda Nilaya | Krishna Das | Shivadwaj, Prema | Abike Babi | Remake of Malayalam film Sanmanassullavarkku Samadhanam |
| June | Panchali | Dinesh Babu | Anirudh, Sunil Raoh, Rambha, Vinayak Joshi | Gurukiran | |
| June | Kalarava | Thimmaraju | Master Samarth, Baby Shravya, Yashwanth, Ramakrishna | J. Vardhan | |

=== July - December ===
| Month | Title | Director | Cast | Music director | Notes |
|---|---|---|---|---|---|
| July | Thalwar | A. T. Raghu | Devaraj, Vinod Kumar Alva, Thriller Manju, Ruchita Prasad | Gopi Krishna | |
| July | Hudugigagi | B. Manjunath | S. P. B. Charan, Radhika Kumaraswamy, Naveen Krishna | Babji - Sandeep | |
| July | Smile | Seetharam Karanth | Shiva Rajkumar, Neha, M. P. Shankar | V. Manohar | |
| July | Vikram | M. K. Maheshwar | Vijay Raghavendra, Sindhu Menon | Rajesh Ramanath | |
| July | Khaki | Shivamani | Shivamani, Devaraj | Rajesh Ramanath | |
| July | Preethi Prema Pranaya | Kavita Lankesh | Ananth Nag, Bharathi Vishnuvardhan, Prakash Rai, Sudharani, Bhavana, Anu Prabhakar, Sunil Raoh, Arun Sagar | Mano Murthy | |
| July | Mane Magalu | Om Sai Prakash | Radhika Kumaraswamy, Vishal Hegde, Srinivasa Murthy | Vandemataram Srinivas | Remake of Marathi film Halad Rusli Kunku Hasla |
| July | Marichike | Vasu Alur | H. G. Dattatreya, Shobaraj, B. V. Radha | B. Prakash | |
| August | Chandra Chakori | S. Narayan | Sri Murali, Naaz, Srinagar Kitty, Priya | S. A. Rajkumar | |
| August | Nanjundi | S. R. Brothers | Shiva Rajkumar, Debina Bonnerjee, Lokesh, Umashri | Hamsalekha | Hamsalekha's 250th film |
| August | Market Raja | R. Shivashankar | Devaraj, Keerthiraj, Vinutha, Namratha | Layendra Kokila | |
| August | Hunter | Thriller Manju | Thriller Manju, Ruchita Prasad, Usha | M. N. Krupakar | |
| August | Kasu Iddone Basu | A. R. Babu | Jaggesh, Radhika Chaudhari, Doddanna, Komal Kumar | V. Manohar | |
| September | Anka | G K Mudduraj | Sai Kumar, Rajendra, Ruchita Prasad, Urvashi Patel | Gandharva | |
| September | Jogula | S. Mahendar | B. C. Patil, Vijayalakshmi, Ruchita Prasad | Hamsalekha | |
| September | Lovve Passagali | B. Mallesh | Nagendra Prasad, Prema, Charan Raj, Doddanna | Hamsalekha | |
| September | Vijayadashami | Bharathi Kannan | Sai Kumar, Prema, Soundarya, Srinivasa Murthy, Jayachitra | Deva | |
| September | Raktha Kanneeru | Sadhu Kokila | Upendra, Abhirami, Ramya Krishna, Kumar Bangarappa, J. V. Somayajulu | Sadhu Kokila | Remake of Tamil film Ratha Kanneer |
| September | Inspector Jayasimha | H. S. Rajashekar | Devaraj, Abhijeeth, Namratha | M N Krupakar | |
| October | Hrudayavantha | P. Vasu | Vishnuvardhan, Nagma, Anu Prabhakar, Doddanna, Rangayana Raghu | Hamsalekha | |
| October | Khushi | Prakash | Vijay Raghavendra, Tarun Chandra, Harish, Sindhu Menon, Madhuri Bhattacharya, Chaitra Hollikere, Ananth Nag, Avinash | Gurukiran | |
| October | Chigurida Kanasu | T. S. Nagabharana | Shiva Rajkumar, Vidhya Venkatesh, Ananth Nag, Shivaram, Avinash | V. Manohar | |
| October | Game For Love | M. D. Sridhar | K. Shivram, Meena, Bhavya, Kazan Khan, Ganesh, Mukhyamantri Chandru | Babji Sandeep | |
| October | Ondagona Baa | Udayasankar | V. Ravichandran, Shilpa Shetty, J. V. Somayajulu, K. R. Vijaya, Charan Raj | Hamsalekha | |
| October | Hucchana Maduveli Undone Jana | Balaji Singh | Jaggesh, Radhika Chaudhari | Prashant Raj | |
| November | Ree Swalpa Barteera | A. R. Babu | Shashikumar, Kausalya, Doddanna, Mukhyamantri Chandru | Venkat Narayan | |
| November | Bala Shiva | M Raghavendra | Sridhar, Naveen Krishna, Rashmi | Hamsalekha | |
| November | Gadibidi Brothers | Ramesh | Nivas, Mandya Ramesh, Urvashi Patel, Ushakiran, Dwarakish | Mahesh | |
| November | Namma Preethiya Ramu | Sanjay–Vijay | Darshan, Navya, Doddanna, Umashree, Hamsavijetha | Ilayaraja | Remake of Malayalam film Vasanthiyum Lakshmiyum Pinne Njaanum |
| November | Daasa | P. N. Sathya | Darshan, Amrutha, Avinash, Satyajith | Sadhu Kokila | |
| November | Partha | Om Prakash Rao | Sudeep, Hardeep | Gurukiran | |
| November | Sri Renuka Devi | Nagendra Magadi | Soundarya, Prema, Jayapradha, Sai Kumar, Charanraj | Hamsalekha | |
| December | Excuse Me | Prem | Sunil Raoh, Ramya, Ajay Rao, Sumalatha | R. P. Patnaik | |
| December | Dreams | Jayanth | Vasu, Ruthika | Tej | |
| December | Dhad... Dhad... | Hemanth Hegde | Krishna Mohan, Durga Shetty, Mandya Ramesh, Avinash | Madhukar | |
| December | Mani | Yogaraj Bhat | Mayur Patel, Radhika, Umashri, Rangayana Raghu | Raja | |
| December | Vijaya Simha | M. S. Rajashekar | Vijay Raghavendra, Rakshita | Gurukiran | |
| December | Ardhangi | Y. Nanjundappa | Sunil Kumar, Anu Prabhakar, Karibasavaiah | V. Manohar | |
| December | Annavru | Om Prakash Rao | Darshan, Ambareesh, Kanika Subramaniam, Suhasini Maniratnam | Rajesh Ramanath | Remake of Tamil film Thalapathi |
| December | Gokarna | Naganna | Upendra, Rakshita, Madhu Bangarappa, Satyajith | Gurukiran | Remake of Tamil film Annaamalai |
| December | Swathi Muthu | D. Rajendra Babu | Sudeep, Meena, Leelavathi, Pavithra Lokesh, Ramakrishna | Rajesh Ramanath | Remake of Telugu film Swathi Muthyam |

== Dubbed films ==
| Title | Director | Cast | Notes |
|---|---|---|---|
| Vijaya Shanti | Nageshwara Rao | Vijayashanti | Dubbed version of Sambhavi IPS |
