= Devaru Kotta Thangi (2009 film) =

- Theatrical release poster
- Directed by: Om Sai Prakash
- Written by: Om Saiprakash; B. A. Madhu (dialogues)
- Screenplay by: Om Saiprakash
- Produced by: Smt Rajamma Saiprakash
- Starring: Shiva Rajkumar; Meera Jasmine; Monica; Suraj
- Cinematography: R Giri
- Edited by: M Muniraj
- Music by: Hamsalekha
- Production company: Sri Sridevi Pictures
- Distributed by: Sri Sridevi Pictures
- Release date: 12 November 2009
- Country: India
- Language: Kannada

Devaru Kotta Thangi is a 2009 Indian Kannada-language film, directed by Om Sai Prakash. The film stars Shiva Rajkumar and Meera Jasmine, with Monica and Suraj.

== Cast ==
- Shiva Rajkumar as Shivu
- Meera Jasmine as Lakshmi, Shivu's Sister
- Monica as Gowri, Shivu's Love interest
- Suraj Lokre as Shekhar
- Avinash as Veerabhadragowda
- Hema Chaudhary
- Sumithra
- Ramesh Bhat
- Sadhu Kokila
- M. N. Lakshmi Devi
- Rekha Kumar
- Sangeetha
- Vasu
- Ramesh Pandith
- Karibasavaiah
- Biradar
- Ramanand

== Production ==
The makers of the film wanted Radhika, who played Shiva Rajkumar's sister in Thavarige Baa Thangi (2002) and Anna Thangi (2005) to play his sister in this film. However, she was unable to play the role because she had quit films. Malayalam actress Meera Jasmine was brought in as her replacement, marking her return to Kannada cinema.

== Soundtrack ==
The music was composed by Hamsalekha.

No.	Song	Singers	Lyrics	Length (m:ss)
1	"Kannadakke Saatiyilla"	S. P. Balasubrahmanyam	Hamsalekha	04:56
2	"Devaru Kotta Thangi"	Chithra, Shankar Mahadevan	Hamsalekha	06:18
3	"Thangi Madhuve"	Hariharan, Nanditha	Hamsalekha	05:21
4	"Obba Thangi Maado Habba"	K. S. Chithra, Rajesh Krishnan	Hamsalekha	05:19
5	"Nettige Bottitta"	K. S. Chithra, Udit Narayan	Hamsalekha	04:42
6	"Ee Loka"	K. S. Chithra, C. Ashwath, Vijay Yesudas, Usha, Nandini Hamsalekha	Hamsalekha	06:03

== Reception ==
A critic from The Times of India wrote that "It's Shivarajkumar's show all the way. The ace actor, with his brilliant acting, brings to life an otherwise dull film". A critic from Sify wrote that "The commercial elements and sentiments are in over dose and if the film needs urgent trimming. The graphic update is very well synchronized in the film, where the lead actors have scored". A critic from Rediff.com wrote that "The movie could have been better but for the cliched formulaic story, regressive posturing and dragging narration".
