= Super Ranga =

2014 Indian Kannada-language action comedy film

- Theatrical release poster
- Directed by: Sadhu Kokila
- Written by: Guruprasad
- Story by: Vakkantham Vamsi
- Based on: Kick (2009) by Surender Reddy
- Produced by: K. Manju
- Starring: Upendra; Kriti Kharbanda
- Cinematography: Ashok Kashyap
- Edited by: Joni Harsha
- Music by: Arjun Janya
- Production company: K Manju Cinemaas
- Release date: 19 September 2014
- Running time: 146 minutes
- Country: India
- Language: Kannada
- Budget: ₹9 crore (US$930,000)

Super Ranga is a 2014 Indian Kannada-language action comedy film directed by Sadhu Kokila and produced by K. Manju under the banner K Manju Cinemaas. It stars Upendra and Kriti Kharbanda in lead roles. The supporting cast features Priyanka Rao, Raghu Mukherjee, Hema Chaudhary Doddanna, Rangayana Raghu, Bullet Prakash and Sridhar. The film is a remake of the 2009 Telugu film, Kick. The limited theater release may have contributed to the 35 days of its run with a one-week gap after completing four weeks.

== Plot ==
Sri Ranga aka Ranga is a happy-go-lucky youth who excels in every field but always does strange and dangerous things to obtain a certain "kick" – a thrill or excitement that he craves. One such activity is secretly double-crossing his childhood friend Azimu while helping him elope. At this point, he meets Naina, who is shocked at his recklessness and writes him off as crazy. Ranga sets his sights on Naina and woos her in a very unorthodox way; he begs her not to fall in love with him. After a host of comical situations. Naina accepts Ranga's love. However, she sets a condition: Ranga must stay in a well-paying job (he had resigned from other jobs due to lack of "kick"), and only then will she agree to marry him. Ranga accepts, but soon resigns again for the same reason and tries to hide it from Naina. When Naina finds out, she breaks up with him and leaves him for good.

Some months later, Naina's parents arrange for her to meet a prospective suitor in Malaysia. Though reluctant, she meets the suitor Ranganath, a tough but honest ACP. She narrates the story of her affair with Ranga, and Ranganath reveals that he is tracking a dangerous thief who has stolen large amounts of money from wealthy (mostly corrupt) politicians. At Malaysia, Naina, her sister, and Ranganath's brother-in-law Prakash Raj run into Ranga again but learn that he has lost his memory and cannot remember his past life. Naina sees this as an opportunity to start their relationship again from the scratch. However, it is revealed that Ranga is not really suffering from amnesia; he has faked his condition by convincing an amnesiac that he is a doctor, and tricked him into diagnosing his condition falsely. Naina is upset but realizes that it was done due to his love for her, and she has hidden her own feelings from him. They reconcile.

Meanwhile, it is revealed that the thief whom Ranganath has been tracking is Ranga. His motives are simple; he steals ill-gotten money from politicians to pay for operations of children suffering from cancer. After manipulating various people, such as an MLA, and stealing from them, he is finally caught in the act by Ranganath. Ranga is still unfazed, celebrating his failure at a street party. He dares Ranganath to catch him in his final crime: stealing money worth ₹500 crore (US$52 million)from the party fund. After many harrowing chases, Ranga pulls it off successfully. Ranganath is demoted from the case and is shocked to learn that his replacement is Ranga, who promises to guard the minister's remaining money. Knowing what is in store for the politicians, Ranganath leaves with a new respect for his foe after learning his true motives for helping the children.

== Cast ==
- Upendra as 'Kick' Sri Ranga
- Kriti Kharbanda as Naina
- Raghu Mukherjee as Ranganath I.P.S
- Hema Chaudhary as MLA Kanchu Kanakaratna
- Doddanna as Minister
- Sadhu Kokila as Halwa Raj aka Prakash Raj
- Bullet Prakash as Police officer
- Rangayana Raghu as Doctor Goli
- Sridhar
- Avinash as Sriranga's father
- K. Manju as motorbike buyer
- Priyanka Rao as Subbu, Naina's younger sister
- Seetha as Ranga's Mother
- Suchithra
- Poornima Bhat
- Jyothi Rai
- Kuri Prathap
- Kaddipudi Chandru
- Joe Simon
- Bank Suresh

== Production ==
=== Development ===
It was announced in August 2013 that the film would be directed by Sadhu Kokila, after speculations that Ramesh Aravind and Loki would be directing it. Kokila had directed Upendra previously in Raktha Kanneeru (2003) and Anatharu (2007), both of which saw success at the box office. The film's title is based on a lyric of the song "Sikkapatte Istapatte" from Super (2010).

=== Casting ===
Super Ranga was to initially star Deepa Sannidhi as the female lead opposite Upendra. Citing date problems, Sannidhi had to leave, who was then replaced by Kriti Kharbanda. Shaam, who starred in the original film, Kick and its Tamil remake, was initially set to reprise his role in this film.

=== Filming ===
The filming began in September 2013. The song "Dance Raja Dance", of the film was shot in Slovenia. It features 12 characters of Upendra in a single visual, made possible by the rotography technique. The film completed its 35-day shoot in Malaysia and was one of the few Kannada language films to have shot there extensively.

== Soundtrack ==
Super Ranga

Soundtrack album by Arjun Janya
- Released: 22 August 2014
- Genre: Feature film soundtrack
- Length: 17:21
- Label: Anand Audio

Arjun Janya composed the music for the film and the soundtracks, with lyrics for the soundtracks penned by K. Kalyan, Upendra and V. Nagendra Prasad. The album has four soundtracks.

Track listing
No.	Title	Lyrics	Singer(s)	Length
1.	"Dance Raja Dance"	K. Kalyan	Upendra	3:45
2.	"Chombu Chombu"	Upendra, V. Nagendra Prasad	Vijay Prakash	4:41
3.	"Nanagu Ninagu"	K. Kalyan	Tippu, Archana Ravi	4:29
4.	"Ninade Nenapu"	K. Kalyan	Arjun Janya	4:26
Total length:				17:21

=== Reception ===
Kavya Christopher of The Times of India gave the album a rating of 3/5 and wrote, "It's an Upendra film. One that has to be quirky in every way, and the music is no different." She added that the song "Dance Raja Dance" is the best of the album.

== Release ==
The film was announced that it would be released on 18 September 2014 to coincide with the occasion of Upendra's birthday. It was released however, the next day. It was reported that the film released in 170 theaters across Karnataka.

=== Critical reception ===
Upon its theatrical release, the film received positive to mixed reviews from critics. Shyam Prasad S. of Bangalore Mirror reviewed the film and wrote, "[Sadhu Kokila] manages to give an 'Uppi' touch to the film", a reference to the characters portrayed by Upendra in his earlier films. He concludes by praising the role of cinematographer Ashok Kashyap and the acting department. S. Viswanath of Deccan Herald reviewed the film giving it a rating of three out of five and called the film "chuckle-a-minute mad caper". He added writing, "Brimming with trademark Upendra mannerisms, the film is a breezy, boisterous ride." Shashiprasad S. M. of Deccan Chronicle gave the film a 2.5/5 rating and writes, "A slight disappointment, it loses its sheen irrespective of the glittery star cast, to boost the box office collections." He called the plot "the real hero.. but the film as an entertainer lacks the kick."
