= Romeo Juliet (2002 film) =

- Film poster
- Directed by: Gunakumar
- Written by: V. Nagendra Prasad (dialogues)
- Screenplay by: Gunakumar
- Produced by: HC Srinivas
- Starring: Vijay Raghavendra; Radhika Kumaraswamy
- Cinematography: S. Krishna
- Edited by: K M Shankar
- Music by: Hamsalekha
- Production company: Srinivasa Productions
- Release date: October 11, 2002
- Running time: 130 minutes
- Country: India
- Language: Kannada

Romeo Juliet is a 2002 Indian Kannada-language romantic drama film written and directed by Gunakumar. It features Vijay Raghavendra and Radhika Kumaraswamy in the lead. The supporting cast includes Reethu Singh, Sagar, and V. Nagendra Prasad. The music for the film is by Hamsalekha.

== Cast ==
- Vijay Raghavendra as Acchu
- Radhika Kumaraswamy as Anu
- Reethu Singh as Rani
- Sagar as Somu
- V. Nagendra Prasad
- Bharath Bhagavathar
- Malathi Sardeshpande
- Doddanna

== Production ==
The film was directed by newcomer Gunakumar and is inspired by Shakespeare's Romeo and Juliet. This is the third film to feature Vijay Raghavendra and Radhika Kumaraswamy after Ninagagi (2002) and Prema Qaidi (2002). The filming began on 17 April 2002 at colleges in Bangalore and Manipal.

== Soundtrack ==
Romeo Juliet

Soundtrack album by Hamsalekha
- Genre: Feature film soundtrack
- Language: Kannada
- Label: Ashwini Audio
- Producer: H.C. Srinivas

The film's music was composed by Hamsalekha. The music rights were acquired by Ashwini Audio.

All lyrics are written by Hamsalekha.

Tracklist
No.	Title	Singer(s)	Length
1.	"Prema Gulabi"	Mangala, Nagachandrika, Ramya, Sunitha
2.	"O My Dream Girl"	Chetan Sosca
3.	"Hurry Up"	Chetan Sosca, Latha Hamsalekha
4.	"Rani Jenu"	Chetan Sosca, Hemanth, Sangeetha, Vijay Aras
5.	"Panchi"	Divya Raghavan
6.	"Acha Cha Chu"	Nanditha
7.	"Neera Neera"	Chetan Sosca, Latha Hamsalekha, Vishwanath

== Reception ==
Reviewing the film for Deccan Herald, a critic wrote that "Despite a catchy title, Romeo Juliet seems to have failed to attract the film buffs. First and foremost the movie appears to be a duplicate of Ninagagi though both the films were made almost simultaneously by different directors".
