= Thavarina Siri =

- DVD cover
- Directed by: Om Sai Prakash
- Written by: Ajay Kumar
- Produced by: Ramu
- Starring: Shiva Rajkumar; Daisy Bopanna; Ashwini; Doddanna
- Cinematography: R. Giri
- Edited by: P. R. Soundar Raj
- Music by: Hamsalekha
- Production company: Ramu Films
- Release date: 19 May 2006
- Running time: 159 minutes
- Country: India
- Language: Kannada

Thavarina Siri is a 2006 Indian Kannada-language drama film directed by Om Sai Prakash and written by Ajay Kumar. The film cast includes Shiva Rajkumar, Daisy Bopanna, Ashitha, Ashwini among others. The film was produced by Ramu while the original score and soundtrack were composed by Hamsalekha.

The film was released on 19 May 2006 to average response where the critics noted the comparisons between the same team's earlier ventures like Thavarige Baa Thangi (2002) and Anna Thangi.

== Cast ==
- Shiva Rajkumar as Mutthanna
- Daisy Bopanna
- Ashitha
- Ashwini
- Adarsha
- Hema Chaudhary
- Ramesh Bhat
- Mukhyamantri Chandru
- Tennis Krishna
- Doddanna
- Sadhu Kokila
- Karthik Sharma

== Production ==
The film was launched on 21 August 2005 on Mahalakshmi Puja day, at outskirts of Rockline studios at Bengaluru. Puneeth Rajkumar clapped the first shot of the film.

== Soundtrack ==
The music of the film was composed and lyrics written by Hamsalekha.

All lyrics are written by Hamsalekha.

No.	Title	Singer(s)	Length
1.	"Baalina Beedi"	Madhu Balakrishnan
2.	"Hasidaga Anna"	S. P. Balasubrahmanyam, Nanditha
3.	"Mathad Mathadu Mallige"	Vijay Yesudas, Nanditha
4.	"Aakashadinda Ilida Apsare"	K. S. Chithra, Kunal Ganjawala
5.	"Preethi Namma"	Madhu Balakrishnan, Nanditha, Mangala
6.	"Jaggithayya"	Mano, Malathi

== Critical reception ==
Chitraloka wrote "We would like to coin it as 'Tower' Na Siri' for 'Thavarina Siri'. This is mainly because everything is on top of tower in this film. The magnanimity, sacrifices, affection in the subject, screenplay, the luxurious takings, splendid music and lyrics and once again on top of the tower is the powerful acting from main leads – Shivarajkumar, Ramesh Bhat and Daisy Boppanna". Deccan Herald wrote "Saiprakash once again proves that he can handle sentimental films effectively. However, the comic scenes, not related to the script, do not go well with the story. Shivarajkumar's performance, as a responsible brother, particularly in the second half, deserves kudos. Glam doll Daisy Bopanna, in the non-glamorous role of a well-educated village girl Priya, displays her acting skills well. Ramesh Bhat impresses. Hamsalekha has composed some good songs, particularly the title song, Hasidavage anna and Mathad mathad mallige. B A Madhu's dialogues and R Giri's camerawork are the other plus points of the film".
