= Katari Veera Surasundarangi =

2012 Kannada-language romantic fantasy film

- Directed by: Suresh Krishna
- Screenplay by: Upendra; Suresh Krishna
- Story by: Munirathna
- Produced by: Munirathna
- Starring: Upendra; Ramya; Ambareesh; Doddanna
- Narrated by: Sudeep
- Cinematography: H. C. Venugopal
- Edited by: Jo. Ni. Harsha
- Music by: V. Harikrishna
- Distributed by: Rockline Production
- Release date: 10 May 2012
- Country: India
- Language: Kannada
- Budget: ₹ 9 crores
- Box office: ₹ 16 crores

Katari Veera Surasundarangi is a 2012 Indian Kannada-language romantic fantasy film starring Upendra in a triple role (two leads and one cameo appearance) and Ramya. The film is a spiritual sequel to Upendra's 2003 film Raktha Kanneeru. Veteran actor Ambareesh also plays a vital role. The film is directed by Suresh Krishna and produced by Munirathna. It is the second full-length 3D film in Kannada cinema.

== Plot ==
Upendra is a wannabe don who dies in a gang war. When he reaches the doors of Heaven and Hell, he decides to go to hell as he feels heaven's beautiful look and silence makes it boring. He soon meets Yama, who is unable to decide whether to put him in hell or heaven as he has not committed any sin nor a good deed. In the midst of this, Upendra finds his father, Mohan (also Upendra) and also falls in love with Indraja, the daughter of Indra. After her initial rejection of him, he manages to get her to reciprocate his feelings.

But Indra, refusing to let his daughter marry a human, challenges Upendra that he has to go back to Earth for 10 days with Indraja with the condition that he forgets the fact that he ever died, once he reaches there. Furthermore, the challenge also stipulates that if he commits a sin during the 10 day period, he will have to forget Indraja. Upendra and Indraja accept the challenge and go to earth with Yama and Chitragupta. Once on earth, Upendra and Indraja get together with Upendra forgetting everything that happened when he died.

But he overhears Indraja talking to Indra secretly and remembers everything. Yama, in the meantime, is desperate to make sure Upendra loses the challenge. He even changes Upendra's face with that of the don who killed Upendra in the first place. The film ends with Yama understanding the power of love and leaving Earth, while Upendra and Indraja get married.

== Cast ==
- Upendra in a triple role as
  - Upendra
  - Mass Manava
  - Mohan, Upendra's father (Temporary Yama)
- Ramya as Indraja
- Ambareesh as Yama
- Ajay
- Doddanna as Chitragupta
- Sridhar as Indra
- Muthappa Rai as himself
- Balaraj
- Suman Ranganathan (special appearance)
- Rishika Singh (special appearance)
- Ramnitu Chaudhary (special appearance)
- Shobharaj

== Production ==
=== Casting ===
The film was earlier rumoured to be a remake of Malayalam hit film Udayananu Tharam and was also rumoured to be having shades of Rajkumar starrer Katari Veera which was released in 1966. However, in a press meet Upendra denied all the rumours and said that his version is completely fresh and has no links with the above-mentioned films whatsoever. Producer Munirathna, who was once the main reason behind the banning of actress Nikita Thukral had approached her to do an item number dance for this film. Nikita had turned down the offer. Upendra had earlier titled this film as Yamendra Upendra and Sadhu Kokila had to direct this film. However, due to several reasons, Suresh Krishna was finally hired to direct it. A single song in the film has three actresses such as : Suman Ranganath, Ramanito Choudary and Rishika Singh.

=== Filming ===
Even during the making, the film drew the attention of stars from other industries. Bollywood actors Sunil Shetty, Mithun Chakraborty, Jaya Prada and Tamil star Karthik visited the shooting after the makers used seven cameras at a time.

=== Promotion & Publicity ===
The trailers of Kataari Veera Sura Sundaraangi which were shown in the single screen theaters and multiplexes across Karnataka aroused lot of appreciation among the audience. Meanwhile, Upendra, Ramya and Munirathna promoted the film.

== Soundtrack ==
Katari Veera Surasundarangi

Soundtrack album by V. Harikrishna
- Released: 19 April 2012
- Genre: Feature film soundtrack
- Label: Ashwini Media Networks
- Producer: V. Harikrishna

No.	Title	Lyrics	Singer(s)	Length
1.	"Ambika Chali Thalenu"	V. Nagendra Prasad	Hemanth, Anuradha Bhat	03:59
2.	"Jum Jumka"	Kaviraj	Sonu Nigam, Sunitha	04:32
3.	"Oo La La"	Upendra	Tippu, Priyadarshini	04:39
4.	"Oorige Nee"	Upendra	Upendra, Sunitha	04:18
5.	"Parijatha"	Chi. Udaya Shankar, V. Nagendra Prasad	Sunitha	04:34

== Reception ==
=== Critical response ===
A critic from The Times of India scored the film at 3 out of 5 stars and says "Full marks to Ambarish for his excellent portrayal of Yama. Doddanna has done justice to his role. A surprise character is Muthappa Rai who has executed a don's role quite well. Music by V Harikrishna is average. Cinematography by HC Venu is brilliant". A critic from NDTV wrote "cinematographer H.C. Venu and editor Jony Harsha's technical support. But Hari Krishna's music is inconsistent. Katari Veera Sura Sundaraangi is a well-made entertainer. The 3D format is a treat to watch". Srikanth Srinivasa from Rediff.com scored the film at 3.5 out of 5 stars and wrote "Katari Veera Sura Sundaraangi will do for Kannada cinema what Avatar did for Hollywood. Producer Munirathna Naidu needs to be commended for investing in a 3D film and pioneering it in Kannada cinema. Just forget the story. Watch it with your 3D glasses on and be entertained!". B S Srivani from Deccan Herald wrote " “Katariveera...” manages to wow viewers mainly through its art design and Upendra’s dialogues that have a touch of desperation. But these are desperate times, aren’t they?". A critic from News18 India wrote "V Harikrishna is not with lovely numbers in this film. Parijatha song for Ramya in heaven is the best one.This is worth watching for 3D technology lovers".

== Box office ==
Its opening weekend collection was a strong ₹ 57 million. The film went on to gross a total of ₹ 72 million in its first week, thus breaking the records set by Chingari which had collected ₹ 60 million in its first week. Katari Veera Surasundarangi was reported to be one of the biggest openers of Kannada cinema of its time next to Anna Bond and Jogayya. The film recovered its investment at the end of its second week The film grossed more than ₹ 160 million at the box office after completing 50 days of run in 16 centers across Karnataka. Katari Veera Suruasundarangi was declared as a Super Hit and One of the Highest Grossing Kannada film of 2012.

== Accolades ==
Ceremony	Category	Nominee	Result
2nd South Indian International Movie Awards	Best Film	Munirathna	Won
2nd South Indian International Movie Awards	Best Director	Suresh Krishna	Nominated
2nd South Indian International Movie Awards	Best Cinematographer	H. C. Venugopal	Nominated
2nd South Indian International Movie Awards	Best Actor	Upendra	Won (Critics)
2nd South Indian International Movie Awards	Best Actor in a Supporting Role	Doddanna	Nominated
