= Amrutha Vaani =

- Directed by: B. R. Rajashekar
- Written by: B. R. Rajashekar
- Story by: B. R. Rajashekar
- Produced by: B. R. Rajashekar; Ramya Rajashekar; G Muniraju
- Starring: Ajay Rao; Naveen Krishna; Radhika Kumaraswamy
- Cinematography: Sundarnath Suvarna
- Edited by: Suresh Urs
- Music by: Songs: M. P. Naidu; Score: S. P. Venkatesh
- Production company: Chathurthi Creators
- Release date: May 18, 2007
- Running time: 131 minutes
- Country: India
- Language: Kannada

Amrutha Vaani is a 2007 Indian Kannada-language romance film written, directed and co-produced by B. R. Rajashekar. It stars Ajay Rao and Radhika Kumaraswamy along with Naveen Krishna. The supporting cast includes Doddanna, Sadhu Kokila, Bullet Prakash, Girish and Girija Lokesh. The score and soundtrack for the film are by M. P. Naidu.

== Cast ==
- Naveen Krishna as Vishwas
- Ajay Rao as Samarth
- Radhika Kumaraswamy as Sumathi
- Doddanna
- Sadhu Kokila
- Bullet Prakash
- Girish
- Girija Lokesh
- Ashalatha
- M. S. Umesh
- NGF Ramamurthy
- Sridhar
- Karthik Sharma

== Soundtrack ==
Amrutha Vaani

Soundtrack album by M. P. Naidu
- Genre: Feature film soundtrack
- Language: Kannada
- Label: Lahari Music
- Producer: B. R. Rajashekar

The film's background score was by S. P. Venkatesh and the soundtrack was composed by M. P. Naidu. The music rights were acquired by Lahari Music.

Tracklist
| No. | Title | Lyrics | Singer(s) | Length |
|---|---|---|---|---|
| 1. | "Gelathana Gelathana" | Hamsalekha | S. P. Balasubrahmanyam, Shaan |
| 2. | "Hrudaya Haaduthide" | M. N. Vyasa Rao | Kunal Ganjawala, K. S. Chithra |
| 3. | "Jigidu Jigidu Haado" | V. Nagendra Prasad | Karthik, Vijay Yesudas, Nanditha |
| 4. | "Hoovige Dumbee" | Doddarange Gowda | Madhu Balakrishnan, K. S. Chithra |
| 5. | "Manase Helu Manasae" | M N Vyasa Rao | Hariharan |

== Reception ==
A critic from Rediff.com wrote that "B R Rajashekhar's directorial debut, Amruthavaani is a triangular love story with good narration".
