= Rowdy Aliya =

- Directed by: Om Sai Prakash
- Written by: Om Sai Prakash
- Produced by: Neha
- Starring: Shiva Rajkumar; Priyanka Trivedi; Jayamala; Chaya Singh
- Cinematography: Dasari Seenu
- Edited by: P. R. Sounder Rajan
- Music by: Koti; Sadhu Kokila; Rajesh Ramanath; K. Kalyan; Babji-Sandeep; Srishaila; Vandemataram Srinivas
- Production company: Komal Enterprises
- Release date: 6 February 2004
- Running time: 150 minutes
- Country: India
- Language: Kannada

Rowdy Aliya is a 2004 Indian Kannada comedy - action film directed and written by Om Sai Prakash and produced by Neha. The film features Shiva Rajkumar and Priyanka Trivedi in the lead roles along with Jaimala and Chaya Singh in other pivotal roles.

The film featured original score and soundtrack composed and written by a team of 7 composers. Though the 2003 movie Sri Ram was announced as Shiva Rajkumar's 75th movie, this movie became the 75th movie in the order of release.

== Cast ==
- Shiva Rajkumar as Raja
- Priyanka Upendra as Rani
- Jayamala as Malini Devi
- Chaya Singh as Kuppamma
- Sharan as Sripathi
- Doddanna as Malini Devi's brother
- Sadhu Kokila as Inspector Jayasimha
- Ramesh Bhat as Madayya
- Ashok as Raje Gowda, Raja's father
- Avinash as Ramayya, Malini Devi's husband
- Dharma as Raviteja
- Shivaram as college principal
- M. S. Umesh as peon in college
- Chitra Shenoy as Lakshmi, Raja's mother
- Ashalatha as Asha, Raviteja's mother
- Rekha Das as doctor
- Rajesh Nataranga as estate worker
- Vaijanath Biradar
- Gandasi Nagaraj
- Adugodi Srinivas
- Srishailan
- Sithara
- Sarojamma
- Chandrakumari

== Production ==
The film was launched at Bangalore Palace grounds.

== Soundtrack ==
The music was composed by seven music directors, including Koti, Sadhu Kokila, Rajesh Ramanath, K. Kalyan, Babji-Sandeep, Srishaila and Vandemataram Srinivas. The singers were largely notable Bollywood singers apart from Shivarajkumar himself singing a track.

Track listing
| No. | Title | Lyrics | Music | Singer(s) | Length |
|---|---|---|---|---|---|
| 1. | "Nanagintha Yaaru" | K. Kalyan | Koti | KK, Sunidhi Chauhan |
| 2. | "Ee Beautiya" | Prasanna | Sadhu Kokila | Abhijeet Bhattacharya, Hema Sardesai |
| 3. | "Hero Hero Hatrick Hero" | K. Kalyan | Rajesh Ramanath | Shivarajkumar, Shamitha Malnad |
| 4. | "Ivala Pose Nodu" | K. Kalyan | K. Kalyan | Shankar Mahadevan |
| 5. | "Ammamma Shaku" | Shree Ranga | Babji-Sandeep | Sonu Nigam, Sowmya Raoh |
| 6. | "Yamma Yammamamma" | Kaviraj | Srishaila | Shaan, Anuradha Sriram |
| 7. | "Jaya Jaya Shankari" | K. Kalyan | Vandemataram Srinivas | Shankar Mahadevan, Manjula Gururaj |

== Marketing ==
As part of film's promotions, on Kannada Rajyotsava day, producer Mohan "arranged a rally with 45 bikers" who took part with Kannada flag followed by four Matadors with huge cutouts of the film spotting the protagonist's look from the film and "visited all major areas of Bangalore to promote the film through interactive questions and quiz to people of all these locations from morning till evening and giving away Rowdy Aliya film cassettes and T-shirts to the winners".

== Reception ==
Chitraloka called it "worth your money". Sify wrote "The film is noted for the performance of Shivraj Kumar - Priyanka- Chaya - Jaimala. Lavish production values and good songs make the film worth watching".
