= Rajani (film) =

- DVD Cover
- Directed by: Thriller Manju
- Written by: K. Ramnarayan (dialogues)
- Story by: Akula Siva
- Based on: Krishna (2008)
- Produced by: Ramu
- Starring: Upendra; Aarti Chabria
- Cinematography: R. Janardhan Babu
- Edited by: Govardhan
- Music by: Hamsalekha
- Production company: Ramu Enterprises
- Release date: 18 September 2009
- Country: India
- Language: Kannada

Rajani is a 2009 Indian Kannada-language romantic comedy film directed by Thriller Manju and produced by Ramu for his banner Ramu Enterprises. The movie is a remake of 2008 Telugu film Krishna (2008). The film features Upendra and Aarti Chabria in the lead roles. The film's score and soundtrack is composed by Hamsalekha.

The film released across Karnataka on 18 September 2009 coinciding Upendra's birthday.

== Plot ==
The film is about Rajani (Upendra), who was once a software engineer but quits his job to give it to his friend and now is unemployed in Mysore. Sandhya (Aarti Chabria) is a girl from Bangalore who studies in college and comes to Mysore for her vacation to stay with her elder brother Bobby (Rangayana Raghu) and his wife (Chitra Shenoy). Rajani falls in love with Sandhya at first sight and starts chasing her to win her heart and enters the upper portion of their house as tenants with his brother Chandrashekar (Ramesh Bhat) and sister-in-law (Thulasi Shivamani). In the process, Rajani has a clash with local rowdy Lanka Raju (Kadhal Dhandapani). Mistaking him to be one Tapori, Sandhya hates him first but later realizes his true nature. She returns to Bangalore and lives with her older brother Sharath (Sharath Lohitashwa), a former builder and now a very powerful rowdy who is very possessive and protective about his sister. Rajani follows Sandhya to Bangalore and works his way into her house with Bobby's help, and finally, both of them confess their love. There, Rajani knows Sandhya's flashback and how she is being chased by the notorious and cruel Jakka (Mukul Dev), assisted by his uncle (Doddanna) for marriage. In the end, Sharath kills Jakka, and Rajani marries Sandhya.

== Cast ==
- Upendra as Rajani
- Aarti Chabria as Sandhya
- Mukul Dev as Jagadish Karnath alias Jakka
- Doddanna as Paandu
- Kadhal Dhandapani as Lanka Raju
- Sadhu Kokila as The person who lives in neighbouring Place of banglore
- Ramakrishna as Government Officer
- Rangayana Raghu as Bobby
- Sharath Lohitashwa as Sharath
- Chitra Shenoy as Bobby's wife
- Ramesh Bhat as MRO Chandrashekhar
- Thulasi Shivamani as Chandrashekhar's wife
- Bullet Prakash
- Mandya Ramesh
- Sathyajith as Advocate Sushil Kumar
- Kuri Prathap
- Killer Venkatesh

== Soundtrack ==
The film's score and soundtrack is composed by Hamsalekha. The audio released under the Anand Audio label.

All lyrics are written by Hamsalekha.

| No. | Title | Singers | Length |
|---|---|---|---|
| 1. | "Dhan Dhan" | Mano, Nanditha |
| 2. | "Vottal Kannole" | Gurukiran, Anuradha Bhat |
| 3. | "Barthiya Barthiya" | Udit Narayan, Latha Hamsalekha |
| 4. | "Thiruboki" | Kailash Kher, Malgudi Subha |
| 5. | "Pizza Priya Pizza" | Kunal Ganjawala, Anuradha Sriram |

== Reception ==
=== Critical response ===
A critic from The New Indian Express wrote "The film is technically superior with good fights and song sequences. "Rajini" is a huge entertainer for Upendra fans. 'Rajini' a must-watch for Upendra fans". BS Srivani from Deccan Herald wrote "Coming to music, it is refreshing to see that Hamsalekha has loosened up a bit. He blasts some ‘jhakaas’ music for the front-benchers while some sensitive listeners are bound to be amazed at the cheek of the lyrics in two songs (Thriller Manju aims to thrill, after all). This Rajani is one ‘fultoo’ entertainer". A critic from Bangalore Mirror wrote "Stunt master turned director Thriller Manju finally manages to direct a film worth watching. After two dozen original films and a copied logo for his production house, Ramu reverses the trend here. He gets an original logo done and remakes the Telugu film Krishna. And for all those producers calling for austerity measures, this film has an answer. There is a song in which Upendra goes after Aarati asking her to follow him to Nandi Hills and Basavanagudi. The song has been shot abroad".
