= Thavarige Baa Thangi =

- Official poster
- Directed by: Om Sai Prakash
- Written by: B. A. Madhu (Dialogues)
- Screenplay by: Ajay Kumar
- Story by: Ajay Kumar
- Produced by: R. S. Gowda
- Starring: Shiva Rajkumar; Anu Prabhakar; Radhika; Adarsh; Hema Choudhary; Komal
- Cinematography: R. Giri
- Edited by: P. R. Soundar Raj
- Music by: Hamsalekha
- Production company: Mega Hit Films
- Release date: 1 November 2002
- Running time: 151 minutes
- Country: India
- Language: Kannada
- Box office: ₹ 5 crores

Thavarige Baa Thangi is a 2002 Indian Kannada-language drama film directed by Om Sai Prakash and written by Ajay Kumar. The film cast includes Shiva Rajkumar, Anu Prabhakar, Radhika, Adarsh, Hema Choudhary and Komal Kumar among others. The film was produced by R. S. Gowda while the original score and soundtrack were composed by Hamsalekha.

The film was released on 1 November 2002 and became one of the highest-grossing films of the year. The plot revolves around the bonding between Shivanna and Laxmi, who became orphans after their parents death, and how Laxmi faces extreme torture from her husband's parents and in-laws and how her brother tries to save her. The film was later remade in Telugu as Puttintiki Ra Chelli (2004). The success of this film which deals with the brother-sister bonding made the director to repeat the same theme in most of his forthcoming films with Shiva Rajkumar like Anna Thangi (2005), Thavarina Siri (2006) and Devaru Kotta Thangi (2009).

== Cast ==
- Shiva Rajkumar as Shivanna
- Anu Prabhakar as Gouri
- Radhika as Lakshmi
- Adarsh as Akash
- Hema Choudhary
- Komal Kumar as Nandeesha
- Avinash
- Bhavya
- Doddanna
- Sadhu Kokila
- Sarika Raje Urs
- Tanuja
- Kavitha
- Padma Vasanthi
- Pushpa Swamy
- Keerthiraj
- Krishne Gowda
- M. S. Umesh
- Rama Murthy
- Anil Kumar
- Sridhar Raj
- Gandasi Nagaraj
- Vaijanath Biradar

== Soundtrack ==
The music of the film was composed by and lyrics written by Hamsalekha.

Thavarige Baa Thangi

Soundtrack album by Hamsalekha
- Released: 4 October 2002
- Genre: Feature film soundtrack
- Label: Anand Audio

No.	Title	Lyrics	Singer(s)	Length
1.	"Jaana Mari Jaana Mari"	Hamsalekha	K. S. Chithra
2.	"Ravivarma Baaro Baaro"	Hamsalekha	S. P. Balasubrahmanyam, K. S. Chithra
3.	"Thavarige Baa Thangi"	Hamsalekha	Madhu Balakrishnan
4.	"Ghali Ghali Ghalige"	Hamsalekha	S. P. Balasubrahmanyam, Manjula Gururaj
5.	"Thangi Ninna"	Hamsalekha	Madhu Balakrishnan
6.	"Jaana Mari Jaana Mari"	Hamsalekha	Madhu Balakrishnan
7.	"Muthaide Maathanu"	Hamsalekha	K. S. Chithra, Chetan Sosca

== Reception ==
A critic from Viggy wrote that "Shivarajkumar after quite some time appearing in a different role and managed to make people weep".

== Awards ==
- Karnataka State Film Award for Best Supporting Actor - Komal
