= Bhairadevi =

Indian supernatural thriller film

- Theatrical release poster
- Directed by: Srijai
- Written by: Srijai
- Produced by: Radhika Kumaraswamy
- Starring: Radhika Kumaraswamy; Ramesh Aravind; Anu Prabhakar; Skanda Ashok; P. Ravishankar
- Cinematography: J. S. Wali
- Edited by: C. Ravichandran
- Music by: K. K. Senthil Prasath
- Production company: Shamika Enterprises
- Release date: 3 October 2024
- Running time: 134 minutes
- Language: Kannada

Bhairadevi is a 2024 Kannada supernatural thriller film written and directed by Srijai and produced by Radhika Kumaraswamy. Besides Radhika in dual roles, the film features Ramesh Aravind, Anu Prabhakar, Skanda Ashok, P. Ravishankar and Rangayana Raghu in lead supporting roles. The makers are planning for a sequel post the release of the film on 3 October 2024.

== Cast ==
- Radhika Kumaraswamy as Bhairadevi/Aghori/Bhoomi
- Ramesh Aravind as DCP Aravind
- Anu Prabhakar as Shalini
- Rangayana Raghu as Veeraiah
- P. Ravishankar as Aghori
- Skanda Ashok
- Shivaram
- Suchendra Prasad
- Malavika Avinash
- Padmaja Rao

== Soundtrack ==
The film's score and soundtrack was composed by K. K. Senthil Prasath and lyrics were written by Srijai.

- "Kali Amma Baa" - Malathi
- "Jai Durga" - P. Ravishankar

== Reception ==
The film received positive reviews from critics.

Jagadish Angadi of Deccan Herald rated the film three out of five stars and wrote that "Despite flaws, the engaging second half saves the film. Bhairadevi will entertain those who love supernatural thrillers." Sridevi S of The Times of India gave it three out of five stars and wrote, "In the era of horror comedy, Bhairadevi presents a horror script in all its glory, albeit with a predictable storyline. If horror films are your jam, you can give this film a try." Sunayana Suresh of The South First gave it three out of five stars and opined that "The way the story traverses through the entire twists and turns might not entirely be dexterous or novel, but it does provide the necessary entertainment, which keeps the audience engaged."
