= Chandra Chakori =

- Promotional poster
- Directed by: S. Narayan
- Screenplay by: S. Narayan; Elakkian
- Story by: S. Narayan
- Produced by: H. D. Kumaraswamy; Anitha Kumaraswamy
- Starring: Sriimurali; Priya S Chhabria; Naaz; Srinagara Kitty
- Cinematography: P. K. H. Das
- Edited by: P. R. Soundar Rajan
- Music by: S. A. Rajkumar
- Production company: Chennambika Films
- Distributed by: Jayanna Films; Mars Distributors
- Release date: 15 August 2003
- Running time: 154 minutes
- Country: India
- Language: Kannada

Chandra Chakori (transl. A patridge enamored by the moon) is a 2003 Indian Kannada-language romance drama film directed by S. Narayan and produced by H. D. Kumaraswamy and Anitha Kumaraswamy under Chennambika Films. The film stars debutants Sriimurali, Priya S Chhabria, Naaz and Srinagara Kitty in the lead roles, while Sundar Raj, Doddanna and Ashok appear in supporting roles. The film was remade in 2013 in Odia as Mu Eka Tumara.

== Plot ==
Sudha arrives at her village for her wedding with Mahesh, where she meets Puttaraju, a mute and kindhearted boy. Due to a prank, Sudha learns that Puttaraju was a talkative guy and is pretending to be mute. Sudha meets Puttaraju's relative Gajendrappa and learns about Puttaraju's past.

Puttaraju was in love with Sevanthi, whose father Boregowda held a condition for Puttaraju in order to marry Sevanthi. Due to unusual circumstances, Sevanthi is found dead and Boregowda was imprisoned on charges of killing Sevanthi. Puttaraju vows to never talk with anyone and pretended to be mute. After learning the past, Sudha falls in love with Puttaraju, but Puttaraju rejects her proposal.

Meanwhile, Mahesh and his mother learn about this, where they make Puttaraju and his mother to leave the village. Sudha leaves the wedding to meet Puttaraju after learning that Mahesh and his mother had sent Puttaraju away. Boregowda, who is released from prison, meets Puttaraju and reveals that Mahesh was the one who murdered Sevanthi as he lusts after Sevanthi and was jealous of Puttaraju and Sevanthi's relationship.

An enraged Puttaraju brutally thrashes Mahesh, but leaves him on request of the landlord Gowdru. Gowdru and Boregowda requests Puttaraju to marry Sudha, where a hesitant Puttaraju finally agrees and marries Sudha.

== Cast ==
- Sriimurali as Puttaraju
- Priya S Chhabria as Sudha
- Naaz as Sevanthi
- Srinagar Kitty as Mahesh
- Shari as Puttaraju's mother
- Ashok
- Doddanna as Gajendrappa
- Shobaraj as Boregowda
- Sundar Raj as Subbayya
- Sathyapriya
- Honnavalli Krishna as Naganna
- Tension Nagaraj
- Renuka Prasad
- Kavitha
- Sadhana
- Bhanu Prakash
- Sridhar Raj

== Production ==
The film was initially planned to be simultaneously shot in Telugu. The film was produced by Kumaraswamy, Narayan's friend who previously produced Surya Vamsha (1999) and Galate Aliyandru (2000).

== Soundtrack ==
The music was composed by S. A. Rajkumar and the lyrics were written by S. Narayan.

Track listing
No.	Title	Lyrics	Singer(s)	Length
1.	"Andagaathi Kanna Thumba"	S. Narayan	Hariharan	05:10
2.	"Kuhu Kuhoo Kogile"	S. Narayan	Hariharan, K. S. Chithra	04:41
3.	"Bellam Belage"	S. Narayan	S. A. Rajkumar	05:16
4.	"Jigari Dosth"	S. Narayan	Mano, Sujatha Mohan, Manikka Vinayagam	04:50
5.	"Aaha Jhum Taka Jhum"	S. Narayan	K. S. Chithra	04:53
6.	"Kuhu Kuhoo Kogile (Pathos)"	S. Narayan	K. S. Chithra	04:20

== Release and reception ==
The release of the film was delayed due to an issue between producers and distributors.

A critic from indiainfo wrote that "A good film overall. Three hours of watching this film is a total paisa vasool (transl. money's worth).

== Box office ==
The film ran for twenty-five weeks in several theatres, thereby becoming a silver jubilee film. The success of this film and other films such as Raktha Kanneeru caused a lack of theatre screens for newer releases. This film ran for a year in Prakash Theater in Belgaum. Priya Pereira Chhabria, who made her debut with this film, later took a break from acting and opted for a career in dance.

== Awards ==
- 2003–04 Karnataka State Film Awards
1. Best Third Best Film - H. D. Kumaraswamy and Anitha Kumaraswamy
2. Best Cinematographer - P. K. H. Das
3. Best Art Direction - G. Murthy
