= Hello Yama =

Indian comedy drama film

Hello...Yama
- VCD cover
- Directed by: A R Babu
- Written by: Mohammed Ghouse (dialogue)
- Screenplay by: Mohammed Ghouse
- Story by: M S Ramesh
- Produced by: D Raghu; Balraj Anekal
- Starring: Kashinath; Doddanna; Sadhu Kokila
- Cinematography: Anaji Nagaraj
- Edited by: K M Shankar
- Music by: Sadhu Kokila
- Production company: R And R Enterprises
- Release date: 27 July 1998
- Country: India
- Language: Kannada

Hello...Yama is a 1998 Indian Kannada-language comedy drama film directed by A R Babu and starring Kashinath and Doddanna in the titular role and Sadhu Kokila, who also composed the music. The film was remade in Telugu under the same name in 1999.

== Cast ==
- Kashinath as Suri
- Doddanna as Yama
- Sadhu Kokila as Chitragupta
- Harish Roy
- Tennis Krishna
- Pramod Chakravarthy
- Rinky
- Monisha
- Lavanya
- Ramya
- Pushpa Swamy
- Bhavyashree Rai
- M. S. Umesh
- M D Kaushik
- Vaijanath Biradar
- Yamuna
- Prem (uncredited)

== Production ==
Film publicist K. G. Nagendra clapped the muhurat shot by chance.

== Soundtrack ==
The music was composed by Sadhu Kokila.

Track listing
No.	Title	Singer(s)	Length
1.	"Damal Dumil"	Sadhu Kokila, Sujatha Dutt	4:13
2.	"Dingu Dongu Disco Dance"	Rajesh Krishnan, Mangala, Suma, Kusuma	4:38
3.	"Ee Rambhe Andha"	Rajesh Krishnan, Mangala, Suma, Kusuma	4:55
4.	"Rambha Beda Jamba"	Rajesh Krishnan, Sadhu Kokila, Doddanna, Sujatha Dutt, Mangala	3:27
5.	"Sooji Maalige Mele"	Doddanna, Sadhu Kokila, Sujatha Dutt, Mangala	4:40
Total length:			21:53

== Box office ==
The film was a success and inspired similar films such as Yamalokadalli Veerappan (1998). After the film's success, Nagendra went on to clap for the muhurat shot of other films. A sequel titled Yama in Bangkok was planned in 2011 with Namitha, Jaggesh reprising the role of Yama and Sadhu Kokila reprising his role as Chitragupta.
