= Gokula Krishna =

- Film poster
- Directed by: B. M. Jayakannan
- Written by: B. M. Jayakannan
- Produced by: Shekar Gowda; Narayan Swamy
- Starring: Prajwal Devraj; Ananya
- Cinematography: A. Vinod Bharathi
- Edited by: P. Sai Suresh
- Music by: S. A. Rajkumar
- Production company: Channigaraya Combines
- Release date: 19 October 2012
- Country: India
- Language: Kannada

Gokula Krishna is a 2012 Kannada romantic comedy film written and directed by B. M. Jayakannan and produced jointly by P. Shekar Gowda and Narayan Swamy. It stars Prajwal Devraj and Ananya in the lead roles. Ananya makes her Kannada debut with this film. Bhavya, Jai Jagadish, Srinath, Doddanna and Sadhu Kokila among others play the supporting roles. S. A. Rajkumar is the score and soundtrack composer. The film made its theatrical release on 19 October 2012.

== Production ==
The tantrums of Krishna after arriving from foreign stay for 15 years and how he starts respecting the elders after falling in love are the major portion of this film ‘Gokula Krishna.

== Cast ==
- Prajwal Devraj as Krishna
- Ananya as Aishwarya
- Doddanna
- Srinath
- Sangeetha
- Bhavya
- Jai Jagadish
- Sadhu Kokila
- Suresh Chandra
- Pratap

== Soundtrack ==
No.	Title	Singer(s)	Length
1.	"Neene Neene"	Rajesh
2.	"Idi Prithi Ennale"	K. S. Chithra
3.	"Tajhu Mahalige"	Karthik, Chaitra H. G.
4.	"Kadalinashtide"	Suchith Suresan, Rita
5.	"Sangathi Neeniralu"	Karthik, Kalyani
6.	"Nodu Nodu"	Ranjith

== Reception ==
=== Critical response ===
A critic from The Times of India scored the film at 3 out of 5 stars and says "Full marks to Prajwal for his performance, especially as Krishna. Ananya is too serious throughout the movie. Srinath, Doddanna, Jaijagadish and Sadhu Kokila have done justice to their roles. Music by SA Rajkumar has some catchy numbers. Cinematography by Vinod Bharathi is admirable". Srikanth Srinivasa Rediff.com scored the film at 2 out of 5 stars and says "The background music is louder than the dialogues, which is irritating. Vinod Bharathi's camera work is good, especially in the songs; he has captured some picturesque locales. The film is an average family entertainer, devoid of the usual masala".
