= Sweety Nanna Jodi =

- Directed by: Vijayalakshmi Singh
- Written by: Ramani
- Produced by: Radhika Kumaraswamy
- Starring: Auditya; Radhika Kumaraswamy; Ramya Krishna
- Cinematography: Ajay Vincent
- Edited by: B S Kemparaju
- Music by: Arjun Janya
- Production company: Shamika Enterprises
- Release date: 8 November 2013
- Country: India
- Language: Kannada

Sweety Nanna Jodi is a 2013 Indian Kannada romance film directed by Vijayalakshmi Singh and produced by Radhika Kumaraswamy under her home banner Shamika Enterprises. The film stars Auditya and Radhika in the lead roles. It marks Radhika's comeback to films after a 5-year hiatus.

== Plot ==
This film is about a corporate love between the main characters.

== Cast ==
- Auditya as Siddharth
- Radhika as Priya
- Ramya Krishna as Vasundhara Devi
- Girish Karnad as Priya's father
- Jai Jagadish as Siddharth's father
- Sadhu Kokila
- Jayadev Mohan
- Rekha Das
- Tabla Nani
- Saurav Lokesh

== Production ==
The title of the film is based on a song from Bharjari Bete (1981). A song was shot in Kashmir.

== Soundtrack ==
The music of the film is composed by Arjun Janya.

Sweety Nanna Jodi

Soundtrack album by Arjun Janya
- Released: 12 July 2013
- Genre: Feature film soundtrack
- Length: 29:12
- Label: SounDesign

No.	Title	Lyrics	Singer(s)	Length
1.	"Hesarenu"	Shivanange Gowda	Vijay Prakash	4:37
2.	"CD Madi Kodri"	V. Nagendra Prasad	Tippu	4:29
3.	"I Wanna Sing A Songu"	Chethan Kumar	Shreya Ghoshal	4:21
4.	"Manave"	Kaviraj	Sonu Nigam	4:45
5.	"Sumne Nee Ninthka"	Chandan Shetty	Anuradha Bhat	4:30
6.	"Sobaane Yenni"	Doddarange Gowda	Anuradha Bhat, Meghana Hebbar	2:11
7.	"Engagementu Ringu"	Yogaraj Bhat	Upendra, Sangeetha	4:19
Total length:				29:12

== Release ==
=== Critical reception ===
A critic from The Times of India wrote that "Aditya excels in emotional sequences but it is Ramya Krishna who steals the show with her brilliant performance". Shashiprasad S. M. of Deccan Chronicle wrote that "Apart from 'Sweety Nanna Jodi' being an attempt to relaunch the actress in the lead, the film itself has nothing new to offer".
