= Masala (2005 film) =

2005 film by Dayal Padmanabhan

- Directed by: Dayal Padmanabhan
- Written by: Dayal Padmanabhan
- Produced by: K. C. N. Chandrashekar; S Doreraj; R Venkatadri; R Ravindran; Elengovan; N Kumar; M Manjunath Gowda
- Starring: Sunil Raoh; Radhika
- Cinematography: Satya Hegde
- Edited by: Vinod Manohar
- Music by: Sadhu Kokila
- Production company: Rainbow Talkies
- Release date: 8 July 2005
- Running time: 124 minutes
- Country: India
- Language: Kannada

Masala is a 2005 Indian Kannada-language crime drama film written and directed by Dayal Padmanabhan. The film was produced by K. C. N. Chandrashekar, S. Doreraj, R. Venkatadr, R. Ravindr, Elengovan, N. Kumar, and M. Manjunath Gowda under the banner Rainbow Talkies. It stars Sunil Raoh and Radhika in the lead roles. The supporting cast includes Vishal Hegde, Suja, Nagashekar, and Sandhya. The score and soundtrack for the film was by Sadhu Kokila. The film underperformed at the box office.

== Cast ==
- Sunil Raoh as Vishwa
- Radhika as Sona
- Vishal Hegde as Arjun
- Suja as Preethi
- Nagashekar as Shekhar
- Sandhya as Sona's friend
- Ashitha as herself in a cameo
- Sundar Raj as police inspector
- Ramesh Bhat as Vishwa's father
- Sarigama Viji as Shekhar's father
- Bharath Bhagavathar as Arjun's father
- A. S. Murthy
- Mandeep Roy as security guard
- Venu
- Ganesh as Basava Bellulli
- Pavan Kumar
- Muni
- Yogi
- Sathish
- Bullet Prakash as film director
- Padma Vasanthi as Shekhar's mother
- Malathi Sardeshpande
- Sithara
- Dayal Padmanabhan in a cameo appearance

== Soundtrack ==
Masala

Soundtrack album by Sadhu Kokila
- Released: 2005
- Genre: Feature film soundtrack
- Language: Kannada
- Label: Anand Audio
- Producer: K. C. N. Chandrashekar

Sadhu Kokila chronology
Rakshasa (film) (2005)	Masala (2005)	Deadly Soma (2005)

The film's background score and the soundtracks were composed by Sadhu Kokila. The music rights were acquired by Ananda Audio. The song "Adalu Badalu" is based on "Nibuna Nibuna" from Tamil film Kuthu (2004).

Tracklist
No.	Title	Lyrics	Singer(s)	Length
1.	"Tsunami Tsunami"	Kaviraj	Sunil Raoh, Nanditha
2.	"Adalu Badalu"	Kaviraj	Rajesh Krishnan, Lakshmi
3.	"Masala Masala"	Manjunath Rao	Sadhu Kokila
4.	"Sparshana Iduve"	Manjunath Rao	Rajesh Krishnan
5.	"Muddu Muddu"	Manjunath Rao	Hemanth, Fayaz Khan, Archana Udupa, M. D. Pallavi
6.	"Kanna Mucche"	Manjunath Rao	K. S. Chithra, Sadhu Kokila

== Reception ==
Deccan Herald gave the mixed a film review, commending the first and criticizing the second halves of the film. The reviewer added, "Sunil is his usual self. Nagashekhar, who has mostly been doing comic roles, plays one of the lead characters but his talent has not been utilised much. The roles of the three heroines do not have scope. Radhika's role is limited to some dialogues and two songs. Suja and Sandhya are there for the sake of the other lead actors."
