= Lucky (2012 Kannada film) =

2012 Indian film by Dr. Suri

- Film poster
- Directed by: Dr. Suri
- Produced by: Radhika Kumaraswamy
- Starring: Yash; Ramya
- Cinematography: S. Krishna
- Edited by: Deepu S. Kumar
- Music by: Arjun Janya
- Distributed by: Shamika Enterprises
- Release date: 24 February 2012
- Running time: 148 minutes
- Country: India
- Language: Kannada

Lucky is a 2012 Kannada-language romantic comedy film directed by Dr. Suri and produced by Radhika Kumaraswamy under the banner of Shamika Enterprises, along with the assistance of H. D. Kumaraswamy and V Raghavendra Bunty. The film stars Yash and Ramya in the lead roles, while Sharan, Sadhu Kokila and Vijay Chendoor in pivotial roles. Arjun Janya composed the music for the film, while Krishna and Deepu. S. Kumar handled the cinematography and editing respectively.

Lucky was released on 24 February 2012 and become a box office success. The film was dubbed and released in Hindi as Heart Attack 3.

== Plot ==
Vikram Kumar alias Lucky, a happy-go-lucky graduate, is in love with Gowri, an anchor in a TV program. Gowri gives him the cold shoulder, and helping her keep Lucky at an arm's length is her pug dog Zoo Zoo. Gowri is compelled to resign from her job and takes over as the creative head of an advertising company. Lucky arrives for a job interview at the company, but he learns that Gowri will be handling the interview and will not let him get a job at her workplace.

With the help of his friend Anand alias "420", Lucky takes on a different identity as Vicky, where he changes himself with a new wardrobe and hairstyle. Vicky builds a rapport with Gowri and proposes to her, but learns that she is in love with Lucky. Vicky tries to prove that he is Lucky, but to no avail, as 420 had already destroyed all the things linked to Lucky on his own advice. Gowri strongly tells Vicky that if he were Lucky, Zoo Zoo would have chased him out.

Vicky resigns from the job and later turns up dressed as Lucky. Gowri still rejects him, saying she has started adoring Vicky, but later she confesses to Zoo Zoo that she knows that Lucky and Vicky are the same person and that she is rejecting him as she does not want Zoo Zoo to feel abandoned, although she secretly loves him. After seeing how Gowri adores Lucky, Zoo Zoo reunites them, and Lucky and Gowri get married.

== Cast ==
- Yash as Lucky (Vikram "Vicky" Kumar)
- Ramya as Gowri
- Sharan as Anand aka 420, Lucky's friend
- Sadhu Kokila as Outstanding Sadhu
- Chikkanna as an actor sent by 420
- Vijay Chendoor as Hanumantha, Lucky's friend
- Hemanth G Nag as Lucky's colleague
- M. N. Lakshmi Devi, Lucky's grandmother
- Padma Kumta, Lucky's mother

== Soundtrack ==
Lucky

Soundtrack album by Arjun Janya
- Released: 1 February 2012
- Genre: Feature film soundtrack
- Length: 21:02
- Label: Ashwini Media

Arjun Janya composed the background score and music for the film's soundtrack. The album consists of five tracks. Lyrics for the tracks were penned by Ghouse Peer, Shashank, Jayant Kaikini and Yogaraj Bhat.

No.	Title	Lyrics	Singer(s)	Length
1.	"Chennagidiyalle"	Ghouse Peer	Baba Sehgal	4:35
2.	"Gowramma Baramma"	Shashank	Arjun Janya	4:18
3.	"Hoovina Santhege"	Jayant Kaikini	Sonu Nigam, Shreya Ghoshal	3:45
4.	"Mandyadinda"	Ghouse Peer	Priya Himesh, Ravi Basrur	4:06
5.	"Naan Yen Madli"	Yogaraj Bhat	Arjun Janya	4:18
Total length:				21:02

== Reception ==
Lucky received mixed to positive reviews from critics.

=== Critical response ===
The Times of India gave 3.5/5 stars and wrote "A mass entertainer with Yash at his best." Srikanth Srinivasa of Rediff gave 3/5 stars and wrote "Debutant director Dr Suri needs to be commended for this relaxing, feel-good movie." News18 gave 2.5/5 stars and wrote "Lucky is too predictable, inconsistent and illogical."
