= Munirathna =

Indian politician and film producer

Munirathnam Naidu

Cabinet Minister Government of Karnataka
- In office 4 August 2021 – 13 May 2023
- Ministry: Term
- Minister of Horticulture: 4 August 2021 - 13 May 2023
- Minister of Planning, Programme Monitoring & Statistics: 4 August 2021 - 13 May 2023

Member of Karnataka Legislative Assembly
- Incumbent
- Assumed office 13 May 2013
- Preceded by: M. Srinivas
- Constituency: Rajarajeshwari Nagar

Personal details
- Born: Munirathna; 23 July 1965 (age 61)
- Party: Bharatiya Janata party (2019–present)
- Other political affiliations: Indian National Congress (till 2019)
- Spouse: Manjula
- Occupation: Film producer, politician

Munirathna Naidu, known mononymously as Munirathna is an Indian film producer-turned-politician from Karnataka who served as the Minister of Horticulture and Planning, Programme Monitoring & Statistics of Karnataka from 4 August 2021. Member of the BJP, he was elected as a member of the Legislative Assembly of Karnataka from Rajarajeshwari Nagar in the years 2013, 2018, 2020, and 2023.

Notable films produced by Munirathna include Aunty Preethse, Raktha Kanneeru, Anatharu, Katari Veera Surasundarangi and Kurukshetra.

== Controversies ==
In December 2014, Lokayukta police recovered 1016 BBMP files related to Rajarajeshwari Nagar constituency from Munirathna's house in Vyalikaval.

In March 2018, Munirathna was named in a ₹1500 crore BBMP fake bill chargesheet by the Crime Investigation Department. In the chargesheet, Munirathna, who was working as a civil contractor in 2008–09, was found "colluding with BBMP officials and swindling [money] by executing poor quality road work."

Days before the 2018 Karnataka Legislative Assembly election in May 2018, Bangalore Police booked a criminal case against Munirathna after the Election Commission found around 10,000 fake voter ID cards in an apartment in Jalahalli. As a result of this scandal the election in the Rajarajeshwari Nagar constituency was postponed to 28 May, with Munirathna emerging victorious.

== Filmography ==
- Aunty Preethse (2001)
- Raktha Kanneeru (2003)
- Anatharu (2007)
- Katari Veera Surasundarangi (2012)
- Munirathna Kurukshetra (2019)
