= K. Krishna Mohan =

Indian hurdler

Krishna Mohan
Personal information
- Full name: K. Krishna Mohan
- Nationality: India
- Born: 21 August 1984 (age 42) India

Sport
- Country: India
- Sport: Running
- Event: 110 m hurdles
- Club: Services

K. Krishna Mohan (born 21 August 1984) is an Indian track and field athlete who became the first Indian to break the 14 second barrier in 110 metre hurdles. He held the national record of 13.96 seconds for 110 meter hurdles, which was set at the 48th National Open Athletic Championship held in Kochi on 10 September 2008.
