= Anatharu =

- Film poster
- Directed by: Sadhu Kokila
- Written by: Tushar Ranganath (Dialogues)
- Screenplay by: Sadhu Kokila
- Story by: Bala
- Based on: Pithamagan
- Produced by: Munirathna
- Starring: Upendra; Darshan; Radhika Kumaraswamy; Sanghavi
- Cinematography: K. Krishna Kumar
- Edited by: Shashikumar; Deepu S. Kumar
- Music by: Sadhu Kokila
- Production company: Vrushabhadri Productions
- Distributed by: Sri Durga Parameshwari Productions
- Release date: 13 September 2007
- Running time: 143 minutes
- Country: India
- Language: Kannada

Anatharu (transl. Orphans) is a 2007 Indian Kannada action drama film directed by Sadhu Kokila. The film stars Upendra, Darshan, Radhika, and Sanghavi. It is a remake of the Tamil film Pithamagan.

== Cast ==
- Upendra as Rudra
- Darshan as Sathyaprakash
- Radhika Kumaraswamy as Manju
- Sanghavi as Parvathi
- M. P. Shankar as an undertaker
- Ramaraju
- Honnavalli Krishna
- Sadhu Kokila
- K. V. Manjayya
- Shyam Yadav
- Akki Chennabasappa
- Bangalore Nagesh
- Patre Nagaraj
- Rekha V. Kumar
- Narasimha Murthy
- Shankar Narayan
- M. N. Lakshmi Devi
- Prathap
- Rambha (cameo)

== Soundtrack ==
Soundtrack was composed by Sadhu Kokila. The song "Adada Ahankara" from the original film was retained here as "Jagave Rakshasara".

- "Ello Hutti Ello Haridu" – Hariharan
- "Janana Janana Idu" – Madhu Balakrishnan
- "Jagave Rakshasara" – S. P. Balasubrahmanyam
- "Yaaro Nee Nanna" – Mohammed Aslam
- "Old songs Remix" – Various

== Reception ==
A critic from The Times of India wrote that "Though the first half of the film fails to impress, the latter half is more comprehensible. But the overdose of blood-curdling violence sends out a wrong message". A critic from Rediff.com wrote that "If you have not seen Pithaamagan, then Anaatharu is definitely worth watching especially for Upendra and the efforts of Sadhu's technical team".
