= Ooh La La (film) =

- Directed by: Hemanth Hedge
- Written by: Hemanth Hedge
- Produced by: Ramoji Rao
- Starring: Krishna Mohan; Radhika; Arya Prasad; Sonia Agarwal
- Cinematography: Krishnakumar
- Music by: Suresh Devkumar
- Production company: Usha Kiran Movies
- Release date: 13 June 2003
- Running time: 140 minutes
- Country: India
- Language: Kannada

Ooh La La is a 2003 Indian Kannada-language romance film written, directed and produced by Hemanth Hedge, making his debut. It features Krishna Mohan, Radhika, Arya Prasad and Sonia Agarwal in the lead roles. The score and soundtrack for the film is by Suresh Devkumar. The film was a box office success.

== Cast ==
- Krishna Mohan
- Radhika
- Arya Prasad
- Sonia Agarwal
- Raju Ananthaswamy
- Chithra Shenoy
- Mukhyamantri Chandru
- Umashree
- Sanketh Kashi
- Srinivas Prabhu

== Production ==
The film's director previously worked as an actor for Mathadana (2001). The film was launched on 5 July 2002 at Banashankari.

Hemanth Hegde was inspired by Yash Chopra's style of films for this film, which is a mix of "glam, colour, emotion, comedy and youth". Hegde was keen to make such a film as it has not been attempted in the Kannada film industry, which mostly makes sentimental films. Hegde also wanted the stylish clothing present in Chopra's films to be in this film as well. He hired Simrin and Naveen Bhurani of Galaxy for the clothing department.

The film was shot for around 45 days in Bangalore, Vizag and Mysore.

== Soundtrack ==
The film's background score and the soundtrack were composed by Suresh Devkumar. The music rights were acquired by Ananda Audio.

Tracklist
No.	Title	Lyrics	Singer(s)	Length
1.	"Geleyare Grleyare Birusina Vayasidu"	V. Manohar	Suresh Peters
2.	"Dum Dum Dum Yenal Adam"	V. Manohar	Devan
3.	"Mounave Vandane Snehave Vandane"	K. Kalyan	M. D. Pallavi, Hemanth
4.	"Dumbi Banthu Dumbi Banthu"	Anand	Rajesh Krishnan, Nandita
5.	"Rebabba Rebabbari Ee Youvana"	K. Kalyan	Gurukiran
6.	"He Swalpa Hathra Barthiya"	K. Kalyan	Anuradha Sriram, Rajesh Krishnan

== Release and reception ==
The film was initially scheduled to release on 25 December 2002, but it was delayed due to a royalties dispute with one of the film's playback singers.

A critic from indiainfo.com wrote that "Overall the film is good".
