= Thayi Illada Thabbali =

2003 Kannada film

- Directed by: Om Sai Prakash
- Screenplay by: B A Madhu
- Story by: Ramesh Yadav
- Produced by: Ramesh Yadav
- Starring: Radhika
- Cinematography: Sundarnath Suvarna
- Edited by: P R Soundar Rajan
- Music by: Hamsalekha
- Production company: Royal Pictures
- Release date: 9 May 2003
- Running time: 145 minutes
- Country: India
- Language: Kannada

Thayi Illada Thabbali (transl. Motherless orphan) is a 2003 Indian Kannada-language drama film written and directed by Om Sai Prakash. The film was produced by Ramesh Yadav under the banner Royal Pictures. It features Radhika. The score and soundtrack for the film is by Nadabrahma Hamsalekha and the cinematography is by Sundarnath Suvarna. Radhika received Karnataka State Award for Best Actress for her performance and she also received nomination for Filmfare Award for Best Actress - Kannada.

== Cast ==
- Radhika as Gowri
- Shivadhwaj as Shivakumar
- Srinivasa Murthy as Basava
- Avinash as Nanjappa
- Rajesh
- Bhavya
- Ashalatha as Parvathi
- Chitra Shenoy
- M. N. Lakshmi Devi
- Jyothi
- Smitha
- Sadhu Kokila
- Bank Janardhan
- Michael Madhu
- M. S. Umesh
- Sadashiva Brahmavar

== Soundtrack ==
Thayi Illada Thabbali

Soundtrack album by Hamsalekha
- Genre: Feature film soundtrack
- Language: Kannada
- Label: Akash Audio
- Producer: Ramesh Yadav

The film's background score and soundtrack were composed and written by Nadabrahma Hamsalekha. The music rights were acquired by Akash Audio.

All lyrics are written by Hamsalekha.

Tracklist
No.	Title	Singer(s)	Length
1.	"Doori Doori"	Madhu Balakrishnan, K. S. Chithra
2.	"Eluthale Eddu"	K. S. Chithra
3.	"Ninna Netthimyaale"	Hemanth, K. S. Chithra
4.	"Kanne Bidada Kandanannu"	S. P. Balasubrahmanyam
5.	"Thayi Illa Thavaru Illa"	K. S. Chithra

== Reception ==
A critic from Viggy wrote that "Director Sai Prakash has done every thing that is required to make lady audience cry, which is his success formula". A critic from indiainfo.com wrote that "Overall a good film". Several journalists appreciated Radhika's performance in the film.

== Awards ==
Radhika won Best Actress award in 2003–04 Karnataka State Film Awards.
