= Laali Haadu =

- VCD cover
- Directed by: H. Vasu
- Written by: Ajay Kumar
- Produced by: Sa. Ra. Govindu
- Starring: Darshan; Abhirami
- Cinematography: R. Giri
- Edited by: S. Manohar
- Music by: Sadhu Kokila
- Production company: Thanu Chitra
- Release date: 24 January 2003
- Running time: 157 minutes
- Country: India
- Language: Kannada

Laali Haadu (transl. Song of lullaby) is a 2003 Indian Kannada-language romantic musical film directed by H. Vasu and written by Ajay Kumar. The film stars Darshan and Abhirami. The film was produced by Sa Ra Govindu under his home production Thanu Pictures. Two music directors V. Manohar and Rajesh Ramanath were seen in supporting roles.

The film was critically acclaimed upon release and went on to win Third Best Film award at the Karnataka State Film Awards for the year 2003. The songs composed by Sadhu Kokila became hits. The film was a box office success.

== Cast ==
- Darshan as Puttaswamy alias Anand
- Abhirami as Sangeetha
- Umashree as Anand's mother
- Ruthika
- Srinath
- Ramesh Bhat
- Sadhu Kokila as Tippeswamy
- Doddanna
- Kishan Shrikanth
- Amoolya
- Bank Janardhan
- Chitra Shenoy
- Padma Vasanthi
- Amulya
- V. Manohar (special appearance)
- Rajesh Ramanath (special appearance)

== Soundtrack ==
The music of the film was composed by Sadhu Kokila and lyrics written by K. Kalyan.

Track listing
No.	Title	Singer(s)	Length
1.	"Preethige Ondu"	Udit Narayan
2.	"Jo Laali"	Kavita Krishnamurthy
3.	"Koti Koti Hoogalige"	Rajesh Krishnan
4.	"Magale Magale"	Rajesh Krishnan, Shamitha Malnad
5.	"Olave Nannolave"	K. S. Chithra, Srinivas
6.	"Nanna Hrudaya"	Hemanth, Abhirami
7.	"O Ushe"	Shankar Mahadevan, Nanditha
8.	"Dina Belago"	Hariharan

== Reception ==
A critic from indiainfo wrote that "Technically the film is perfect. Cinematography is first-rate. There are no doubts that this will be one of the good movies of this year".
