= Kasu Iddone Basu =

2003 Kannada comedy film directed by A. R. Babu

- Directed by: A. R. Babu
- Written by: A. R. Babu (screenplay/dialogues)
- Story by: Sri Lakshmi Films
- Produced by: N. Kumar
- Starring: Jaggesh; Komal; Radhika Chaudhari
- Music by: V. Manohar
- Production company: Sri Lakshmi Films
- Release date: 29 August 2003
- Running time: 128 minutes
- Country: India
- Language: Kannada

Kasu Iddone Basu (transl. The guy with money is the boss) is a 2003 Indian Kannada comedy film starring Jaggesh and his younger brother Komal opposite Radhika Chaudhari in the lead roles. The film directed by A. R. Babu has musical score by V. Manohar. It marked the second collaboration between Jaggesh and N. Kumar after Yaardo Duddu Yellammana Jathre released in the same year. Kasu Iddone Basu was released on 29 August 2003.

== Cast ==
- Jaggesh
- Komal
- Radhika Chaudhari
- Hema Choudhary
- Doddanna
- Bank Janardhan
- Chitra Shenoy
- A. R. Babu
- Sridevi
- Mandeep Roy
- M. S. Karanth
- Pushpa Swamy
- Killer Venkatesh
- Keerthiraj
- Roopa
- Budal Krishnamurthy

== Soundtrack ==
The music is composed by V. Manohar

Kasu Iddone Basu

Soundtrack album by V. Manohar
- Released: 18 February 2003
- Studio: Ashwini Digital Studios
- Genre: Feature film soundtrack
- Length: 22:09
- Language: Kannada
- Label: Arun Audio

V. Manohar chronology
Smile (2003)	Kasu Iddone Basu (2003)	Khushi (2003)

No.	Title	Singer(s)	Length
1.	"Enu Yaake Sumnidiyaa"	Rajesh	4:29
2.	"Kaddu"	S. L. Shastri, Sushama Verma	3:31
3.	"Kasiddone Baasu"	Rajesh	4:57
4.	"Lokanne Baluchenna"	Jaggesh, Vijay Urs	5:43
5.	"Maduve Aago"	Hemanth Kumar, Vijay Urs	3:45

== Release and reception ==
The film was originally slated for release on 7 August but was later postponed to 29 August due to a tussle between the producer and the exhibitors after the failure of Jaggesh's previous film Makeup (2002).

A critic from indiainfo wrote that "If you are the type who loves watching films that need less of brainwork but makes you laugh then Kaasu Iddone Baasu is the right film for you".
