= Mane Magalu =

- VCD cover
- Directed by: Om Sai Prakash
- Written by: Om Sai Prakash
- Produced by: K. Vasudha
- Starring: Radhika; Vishal Hedge
- Cinematography: R. Giri
- Music by: Vandemataram Srinivas
- Production company: Srilakshmi Anjaneya Films
- Release date: 1 August 2003
- Running time: 140 minutes
- Country: India
- Language: Kannada

Mane Magalu (transl. Daughter of the house) is a 2003 Indian Kannada-language family drama film written and directed by Om Sai Prakash. It features Radhika and Vishal Hegde. The music for the film is by Vandemataram Srinivas in his Kannada debut. The film is a remake of Prakash's Maa Inti Adapaduchu (1996), which itself is based on the Marathi film Halad Rusli Kunku Hasla (1991). The film was released on 1 August 2003 along with Preethi Prema Pranaya.

== Cast ==
- Radhika as Janaki
- Vishal Hegde
- Srinivasa Murthy
- Prithviraj
- Rajesh Nataranga
- Dharma
- Doddanna
- Sadhu Kokila
- Bank Janardhan
- Michael Madhu
- Kunigal Nagabhushan
- Sarika Raje Urs
- Padma Vasanthi
- Girija Lokesh

== Production ==
The film is about Pulse Polio with Vishal Hegde playing a handicapped man.

== Soundtrack ==
Mane Magalu

Soundtrack album by Vandematharam Srinivas
- Genre: Feature film soundtrack
- Language: Kannada
- Label: Anand Audio
- Producer: K. Vasudha

The film's background score and the soundtracks are composed by Vandemataram Srinivas, who composed for the Telugu film. The music rights were acquired by Ananda Audio. "Taali Bottigaagi" was reused from "Thaali Bottukai" and "Siri Chandavalli" was reused from "Hari Chanadanala"; both are from Maa Inti Adapaduchu (1996).

Tracklist
No.	Title	Lyrics	Singer(s)	Length
1.	"Sri Ramachandrana Cheluva"	Sri Ranga	Nanditha, Sangeetha G.
2.	"Kaaryeshu Daasi"	Prasanna	M. G. Sreekumar, Nanditha
3.	"Taali Bottigaagi"	K. Kalyan	Unni Menon
4.	"Yenu Kalmavo"	Sri Ranga	Sadhu Kokila, Manu
5.	"Anubanda Dooravayithe"	R. N. Jayagopal	M. B. Srikumaran
6.	"Siri Chandavalli"	K. Kalyan	Manu, Nanditha

== Release ==
The film was initially scheduled to release on 18 July 2003. For a week after release, the film was not released in Northern Karnataka due to issues between producers and distributors.

== Reception ==
A critic from Chitraloka.com wrote that "Coming back after a long spell of silence the renowned producer with high respect Katragadda Prasad gives a magnificent movie for the masses especially the rural class of people. The sitting pretty girl Radhika gives a different role in ‘MM’ and she is already getting ‘Seeti’ in the cinema hall. Director Saiprakash a man armed with many credits has once again gives an attractive film". A critic from indiainfo.com wrote that "Overall we have something different here. If not a total paisa vasool (transl. money's worth), MANE MAGALU is definitely a good timepass".
