= Neenandre Ishta =

Indian romantic drama film

- DVD cover
- Directed by: B. Mallesh
- Written by: B. Mallesh (dialogue)
- Screenplay by: B. Mallesh
- Story by: Thulasi Kumar
- Produced by: Geetha Gopal
- Starring: Darshan; Harish Raj; Malavika; Akhila
- Cinematography: V. K. Kannan
- Edited by: Basavaraj Urs
- Music by: Bharadwaj
- Production company: Chennakeshava Films
- Release date: 7 February 2003
- Running time: 135 minutes
- Country: India
- Language: Kannada

Neenandre Ishta (transl. I like you) is a 2003 Indian Kannada-language romantic drama film directed by B. Mallesh. It stars Darshan, Harish Raj, Malavika and Akhila in the lead roles. Srinath, Sumithra, Umashree, Doddanna, Sadhu Kokila, Sundar Raj and Pramila Joshai feature in supporting roles. Amid campus rivalries and emotional misunderstandings, a college student finds herself caught between friendship and love. The film follows Gayatri (Akhila) as her relationships with Vishwa (Raj), Sneha (Malavika), and later Ajay (Darshan) shape the course of her college years.

The film was produced by Geetha Gopal under the banner Chennakeshava Films. Its screenplay was written by Mallesh from a story by Thulasi Kumar. Bharadwaj scored music for the film, while V. K. Kannan served as the cinematographer. Upon its theatrical release on 7 February 2003, the film was met with negative reviews from critics, who noted its "disjointed" storytelling and "lack of continuity" between scenes.

== Plot ==
Gayatri lives with her parents and grandmother in Koppa. After discussing her higher education plans with her parents, she enrolls in a college with a hostel facility and begins a new phase of her life. There, she befriends her seniors Sneha and Vishwa. The three soon develop a close friendship. When Vishwa is seriously injured in an attack by members of a rival college gang and is hospitalized, Gayatri cares for him during his recovery, bringing the two closer together. However, Sneha becomes uneasy about their growing bond, particularly after Vishwa is discharged without informing her.

Meanwhile, Sneha's family begins arranging her marriage and shows her a prospective groom's photograph. Without her knowledge, members of the rival gang replace the photograph with one of Vishwa in an attempt to create misunderstandings within the group. The rivals also engineer situations that further fuel suspicion between the friends. Gayatri discovers Vishwa's photograph among Sneha's belongings and then witnesses an incident that appears to suggest intamacy between Sneha and Vishwa. Convinced that the two are in a relationship, Gayatri decides to leave without informing her friends and relocates to Bangalore, where she continues her studies while staying with a family friend.

In Bangalore, Gayatri is welcomed by Prabhu and his son Ajay, a wealthy and charitable businessman who helps her settle into her new surroundings. As time passes, Sneha learns of Gayatri's whereabouts and travels to Bangalore in an effort to clear the misunderstanding. She is joined by Vishwa, who too misses her deeply, his mother, and their friends. Vishwa explains that he has never been romantically involved with Sneha and that Gayatri had misinterpreted the circumstances surrounding their friendship. Sneha also attempts to convince Gayatri of the truth, but Gayatri remains unconvinced.

Determined to prove that she has no romantic interest in Vishwa, Sneha takes a drastic step that leads others to believe she is involved with Ajay, drawing criticism upon herself. She later reveals that her actions were intended solely to remove any doubts Gayatri may have had regarding her relationship with Vishwa. Realizing that she had misunderstood both of them, Gayatri reconciles with Vishwa. The two reunite, while Vishwa expresses gratitude to Sneha for helping restore their relationship.

== Cast ==
- Darshan as Ajay
- Harish Raj as Vishwa
- Malavika as Sneha
- Akhila as Gayatri
- Siri as student in a special appearance
- Srinath as Prabhu, Ajay's father
- Sumithra as Ajay's mother
- Umashree as Susheela, Vishwa's sister
- Doddanna as Susheela's husband
- Sadhu Kokila as Mandi, Ajay's friend
- Sundar Raj as Sneha's brother
- Pramila Joshai as Sneha's sister-in-law
- Krishne Gowda as Sadananda, Gayatri's father
- B. Jaya as Sunanda, Gayatri's mother

== Production ==
The film was produced by Gopal, then the general secretary of Bangalore District Congress Committee, making his debut as producer. It was reported that Darshan and Harish Raj would play friends in the film, and that they were paired opposite Malavika and Akhila. Aishwarya played a negative role in this film. She worked on this film alongside the unreleased film Rhythm in which she played the lead.

== Soundtrack ==
Neenandre Ishta

Soundtrack album by Bharadwaj
- Released: 7 February 2003
- Recorded: 2002
- Genre: Feature film soundtrack
- Length: 32:22
- Language: Kannada
- Label: Akash Audio

Bharadwaj chronology
Kalatpadai (2003)	Neenandre Ishta (2003)	Anbe Anbe (2003)
External audio
- Neenandre Ishta – Jukebox on YouTube

The soundtrack was composed by Bharadwaj. Bharadwaj reused "Mazhaiyo Puyalo" from the Tamil film Kalatpadai as "Hoove Neenu" and "Premake Endu" while "Nange Neenu Ista" was remade as "Unnai Enakku" for Kadhal Dot Com.

Track listing
No.	Title	Lyrics	Singer(s)	Length
1.	"Nange Neenu Ista"	V. Nagendra Prasad	Rajesh Krishnan, Anuradha Sriram	4:44
2.	"Hoove Neenu"	Geethapriya	Badari Prasad, Gurukiran	4:34
3.	"Maichalakavo"	V. Nagendra Prasad	Badari Prasad, Anuradha Sriram	4:43
4.	"Yaare Teeke Maadali"	Doddarangegowda	B. Jayashree	4:20
5.	"Right Helu"	V. Nagendra Prasad	Gurukiran	4:25
6.	"Baanige Bhoomi"	Doddarangegowda	Nanditha	5:02
7.	"Premake Endu"	B. Mallesh	Nanditha	4:34
Total length:				32:22

== Release and reception ==
The film was released on 7 February 2003 alongside Border.

A critic from Chitraloka.com wrote that "The film ‘Ninendre Ishta’ is a torturous film from the beginning. The scenes are so disjointed that it would leave an impression that the editor of this film has taken a long nap while using his scissors. Story by Thulasikumar has also reached the final stage in love story it seems". Srikanth of Deccan Herald wrote "Yet another mindless campus story. Both the film-makers as well as the audience need to take a break from campus stories. The scenes in the film look so illogical and out of place that one can easily go to sleep while watching the movie. Producer Gopal has sunk some unnecessary money into this project. The scenes suffer from a lack of continuity and dramatisation. When it comes to mouthing the dialogues, the artistes have nothing meaningful".
