= Anna Thangi (2005 film) =

- DVD cover
- Directed by: Om Sai Prakash
- Written by: Om Sai Prakash; B. A. Madhu (dialogues)
- Produced by: Prabhakar
- Starring: Shiva Rajkumar; Radhika Kumaraswamy; Deepu; Vishal Hegde; Srinivasa Murthy; Hema Choudhary
- Cinematography: R. Giri
- Edited by: K. Eshwar
- Music by: Hamsalekha
- Production company: Vijay Films
- Release date: 4 November 2005
- Running time: 150 minutes
- Country: India
- Language: Kannada
- Box office: est. ₹3.9 crore

Anna Thangi (transl. Elder brother, Younger sister) is a 2005 Indian Kannada-language drama film written and directed by Om Sai Prakash. It stars Shiva Rajkumar and Radhika Kumaraswamy in the lead roles. Deepu, Vishal Hegde, Srinivasa Murthy and Hema Choudhary feature in supporting roles. The film follows Shivanna, the son of a wealthy farmer (both played by Shiva Rajkumar), whose deep affection and protectiveness toward his sister Lakshmi (Radhika Kumaraswamy) leads him through love, sacrifice and tragedy amid family conflicts.

The film was produced under the banner Vijay films. Hamsalekha scored music for the film and R. Giri served as the cinematographer. Upon theatrical release on 4 November 2005, it was met with positive reviews. The film was remade into Telugu as Gorintaku (2008).

== Plot ==
Appanna, a wealthy and respected farmer living in Shivapura with his wife Annapurna, remains childless for many years. A priest predicts that the couple will be blessed with children, but warns that they will not live long afterward. The couple eventually has a son, Shivanna, and a daughter, Lakshmi, but soon dies in a road accident unintentionally caused by a trusted family confidante, Muthayya. Orphaned at a young age, Shivanna and Lakshmi grow up sharing a deep emotional bond, with Shivanna becoming highly protective of his younger sister.

Lakshmi later falls in love with Prakash, an educated and intelligent man from a large joint family consisting of his three brothers and their wives. Wishing to learn more about him before approving the marriage, Shivanna and his household servant, Nandisha, disguise themselves as servants and temporarily stay in Prakash's home. Impressed by Prakash's character and affection for Lakshmi, Shivanna agrees to their marriage. Shivanna himself marries Sundari, a friend of Lakshmi, who begins to live with the siblings after a village goon ends up killing her father. While Lakshmi and Prakash are later blessed with two children, Shivanna and Deepa remain childless.

Trouble begins when a cunning aunt moves into Shivanna's house and gradually manipulates Sundari against Lakshmi and her family. At the same time, she instigates Prakash's brothers and their wives by reminding them that the family's property is registered solely in Prakash's name. Exploiting his trust, Prakash's brothers secretly obtain his signature on loan documents and misappropriate the money. When the loans remain unpaid, the court seizes the family's property and imprisons Prakash, leaving Lakshmi and her children homeless.

Lakshmi seeks refuge at Shivanna's house, but the aunt and Sundari turn her away. Furious over his sister's suffering, Shivanna confronts Prakash's brothers in a violent altercation. Meanwhile, a devastated and helpless Lakshmi dies by suicide along with her children by jumping into a well. Shivanna rushes to the spot upon learning of the tragedy and is shattered by the sight of their bodies. Unable to bear the loss of his beloved sister, Shivanna also dies in grief.

== Cast ==
- Shiva Rajkumar in a dual role as Appanna (father) and Shivanna (son)
- Radhika Kumaraswamy as Lakshmi
- Deepu as Sundari
- Vishal Hegde as Prakash
- Srinivasa Murthy as Muthayya
- Ramesh Bhat as Sundari's father
- Tennis Krishna as Nandisha
- Doddanna as Doddanna, a hotel owner
- Sadhu Kokila as "Chimpanzee", Doddanna's son-in-law
- Siddarth as Prakash's brother
- Sundar Raj as Prakash's brother
- Rathasapthami Aravind as Aravind
- Dharma as man who attempts to molest Sundari
- Hema Choudhary as Shivanna's aunt
- Chitra Shenoy as Prakash's sister-in-law
- Pramila Joshai as Prakash's sister-in-law
- Rekha Kumar as a gynaecologist
- Rekha Das as Rukku, Doddanna's daughter
- Sudharani as Annapurna
- Mukhyamantri Chandru as priest
- Bank Janardhan as a village elder
- Karibasavaiah
- Vaijanath Biradar as customer at Doddanna's hotel
- Dingri Nagaraj as customer at Doddanna's hotel
- Srishailan
- Joe Simon as a court bailiff

== Production ==
The film saw the cast and crew of Thavarige Baa Thangi (2002), consisting of star cast Shiva Rajkumar, Radhika, director Om Sai Prakash and composer Hamsalekha, collaborating for second time. The film was launched at Doddaganapathi temple at Basavanagudi. Parvathamma Rajkumar switched on the camera while Geetha Shivarajkumar lit the lamp.

== Soundtrack ==
Anna Thangi

Soundtrack album by Hamsalekha
- Genre: Feature film soundtrack
- Length: 33:38
- Language: Kannada
- Label: Anand Audio

All songs of the soundtrack album are composed, written and scored by Hamsalekha. The album consists of six tracks. The song "Preethse Preethse" from Preethse was imitated by Hema Chaudhary and Sadhu Kokila in the film. The music director of the Telugu version (Gorintaku), S. A. Rajkumar, retained three songs for the film from Anna Thangi.

Track listing
No.	Title	Singer(s)	Length
1.	"Thavaralli Thangiamma"	Udit Narayan, K. S. Chithra	5:47
2.	"Anna Thangiyara"	S. P. Balasubrahmanyam, K. S. Chithra	5:41
3.	"Gandasu Horagade"	Sunidhi Chauhan	5:08
4.	"Thavara Mane"	K. S. Chithra, Anuradha Sriram, Madhu Balakrishnan	5:13
5.	"Anna Nammavanaadaru"	K. S. Chithra	5:31
6.	"Hubbaliya Shehardaage"	KK, Anuradha Sriram	6:18
Total length:			31:38

== Reception ==
Film critic R. G. Vijayasarathy of IANS wrote that "If you are a fan of weepy, sentimental film with old style narration, then 'Anna Thangi' may well please you". Chitraloka wrote "The story of 'Anna Thangi' is as old as the days of 'Anna Thangi'. True. What father has done the son repeats but in the 21st century. 'Thavaru' brand Director Saiprakash has added the extra luxury for the film producer Prabhakar has borne it. Lorry loads of sentiments makes your eyes to collect tears. Finally when you return from the theatre such a situation should not come to brother and sentiments! But where are such brothers and sisters in this world yaar!". S. N. Deepak of Deccan Herald wrote "The first part of the film is the celebration of the brother-sister relationship while the other part deals with the ups and downs of their life. Saiprakash who is an expert in portraying such things does his job neatly. What is new about this film is that he has retold the old story of brother-sister bond".
