= Radhika Kumaraswamy =

Actress and film producer

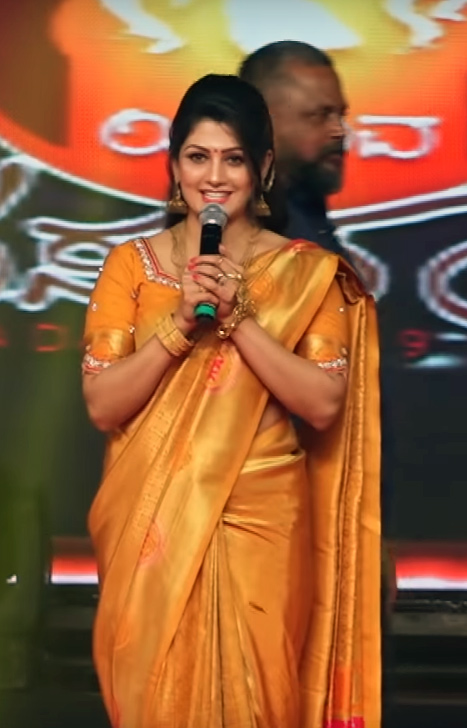
- Radhika at an event
- Born: Radhika Poojary; Mangalore, Karnataka, India
- Other name: Kutty Radhika
- Occupations: Actress; film producer
- Years active: 2002–present
- Partner(s): Ratan Kumar (2000–2002); H. D. Kumaraswamy (2007–)
- Children: 1

Radhika Kumaraswamy (born Radhika Poojary) is an Indian actress and producer, who primarily appears in Kannada films. She made her acting debut in 2002 with the Kannada film Ninagagi. In 2012, she produced her first film, Lucky starring Yash under the name Shamika Enterprises.

== Career ==
Radhika started her acting with the Kannada film Neela Megha Shama (2002) when she had completed her ninth class. Her first release was Ninagagi, opposite Vijay Raghavendra, which was followed by Thavarige Baa Thangi, starring Shivarajkumar; both films were highly successful ventures. In 2003, she appeared in five Kannada films, including Hemanth Hegde's directorial debut Ooh La La; Hudugigaagi, alongside S. P. B. Charan; Yograj Bhat's maiden feature film Mani, in which she played the daughter of a prostitute; Thayi Illada Thabbali and Mane Magalu, all of which were commercial failures. In spite of the film's poor box office returns, Radhika's performance as Gowri in Thayi Illada Tabbali won her the Karnataka State Film Award for Best Actress.

Radhika subsequently began to work in Tamil cinema, acting in four Tamil films and one Telugu film (Bhadradri Ramudu) in quick succession. Her debut Tamil film was S. P. Jananathan's award-winning debut directorial Iyarkai (2003). The Hindu in its review noted that Kutty Radhika as the "impulsive, immature and obdurate Nancy looks just right for the role". Three of her four releases in 2005—Rishi, Masala and Auto Shankar—featured her alongside another lead female character. Again in 2005 she appeared in Anna Thangi collaborating with the Thavarige Baa Thangi team, Shivrajkumar and Radhika again playing the elder brother and younger sister roles, respectively.

The following year, she was again seen in five Kannada films and one Tamil film Ulla Kadathal, that remains her last Tamil release. On her performance in Hatavadi, Rediff.com's critic R. G. Vijayasarathy wrote: "Though this is essentially a Ravichandran film, it is to Radhika's credit that she stands up to a superb performance. Her emotions are perfect and she is presented very well on screen".

Radhika has also worked as a film distributor and producer. She has acquired the distribution rights of her own film Anatharu (2007), co-starring Upendra and Darshan. In 2008, she bought the rights of her film Ishwar, which was launched in 2007 as Narasimha, and revived it, although she was unsuccessful in releasing it. She later established a production studio named Shamika Enterprises and produced the film Lucky, starring Ramya and Yash.

In 2013, she made a comeback to acting with Sweety Nanna Jodi which she also produced. With regards to her performance, Sify stated: "Radhika...is a treat to watch and has given a brilliant performance" while Rediff wrote: "Radhika looks ravishing and comes as a surprise for those who have watched her earlier films".

== Personal life ==
Born in a Tulu-speaking family, Radhika reportedly married Ratan Kumar at the Sri Durga Parameshwari Temple, Kateel on 26 November 2000. In April 2002, Ratan Kumar filed a complaint, alleging that Radhika's father Devraj had abducted her as he feared that news of her marriage may "jeopardise her career". Only a few days later, Radhika's mother wanted the marriage to be annulled as Radhika was just 13 1/2 years old at the time and said that Ratan Kumar had forcibly married her. Devraj further claimed that Ratan had tried to burn Radhika alive. Ratan Kumar died in August 2002, following a heart attack.

In November 2010, Radhika revealed that she was married to H.D. Kumaraswamy, former chief minister of Karnataka. According to Radhika, they married in 2007 and have a daughter named Shamika. They separated in 2015.

== Filmography ==
=== As actor ===
Year	Title	Role	Language	Notes	Ref
2002	Ninagagi	Madhu	Kannada		
2002	Neela Megha Shyama	Neelamegha	Kannada		
2002	Prema Qaidi	Nandini	Kannada		
2002	Romeo Juliet	Anu	Kannada		
2002	Thavarige Baa Thangi	Lakshmi	Kannada		
2003	Thayi Illada Thabbali	Gowri	Kannada	Karnataka State Film Award for Best Actress	
2003	Hudugigagi	Chitra	Kannada		
2003	Ooh La La	Sowmya	Kannada		
2003	Mane Magalu	Janaki	Kannada		
2003	Iyarkai	Nancy	Tamil		
2003	Mani	Gowri	Kannada		
2004	Varnajaalam	Anitha	Tamil		
2004	Bhadradri Ramudu	Seetha	Telugu		
2004	Meesai Madhavan	Rani	Tamil		
2005	Rishi	Spoorthi	Kannada		
2005	Ulla Kadathal	Ramya	Tamil		
2005	Masala	Sona	Kannada		
2005	Auto Shankar	Gowri	Kannada		
2005	Anna Thangi	Lakshmi	Kannada		
2006	Mandya	Ganga	Kannada		
2006	Hettavara Kanasu	Kanasu	Kannada		
2006	Hatavadi	Amisha	Kannada		
2006	Good Luck	Mandakini	Kannada		
2006	Odahuttidavalu	Alamelu	Kannada		
2007	Anatharu	Manju	Kannada		
2007	Janapada	Ragha	Kannada		
2007	Amrutha Vaani	Sumathi	Kannada		
2008	Navashakthi Vaibhava	Durga Parameshwari	Kannada		
2013	Sweety Nanna Jodi	Priya	Kannada		
2014	Avatharam	Rajeshwari	Telugu		
2015	Rudra Tandava	Jhanavi	Kannada		
2019	Damayanthi	Damayanti	Kannada		
2022	Oppanda	Anjali	Kannada		
2022	Ravi Bopanna	Radhika	Kannada		
2024	Bhairadevi	Bhaira Devi/ Bhoomika	Kannada		
TBA	Ajagrata†	Siri	Kannada	Filming	

=== As producer ===
Year	Film	Ref
2012	Lucky	
2013	Sweety Nanna Jodi	
2024	Bhairadevi	

== Television ==
Year	Show	Role	Channel	Notes
2017	Dance Dance Juniors	Judge	Star Suvarna	
