= Sadhu Kokila =

Indian actor and composer (born 1966)

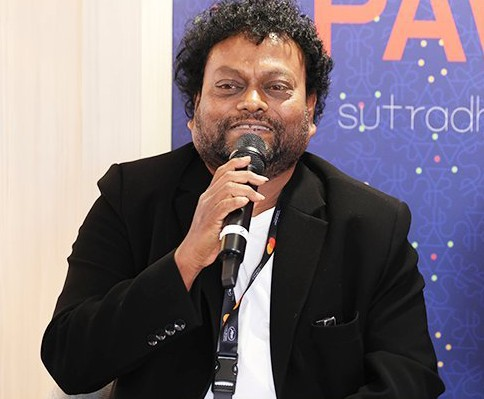
- Born: Sahaya Sheelan Shadrach; 24 March 1966 (age 60); Bangalore, Karnataka, India
- Occupations: Musician; actor; film director; singer; producer
- Years active: 1992–present
- Spouse: Saleena
- Children: 2

Sahaya Sheelan Shadrach (born 24 March 1966), known by his stage name Sadhu Kokila, is an Indian comedian, musician, actor, film director, producer, occasional screenwriter and lyricist who works in Kannada cinema. He began his career as a composer before taking to acting in films, appearing mostly in comic roles. He has directed ten Kannada films, the most notable one being Raktha Kanneeru (2003).

As a composer, he is a two-time recipient of the Karnataka State Film Award for Best Music Director, for Rakshasa (2005) and Inthi Ninna Preethiya (2008). As an actor, he has received multiple nominations and awards in the category of Best Comedian in the SIIMA Awards.

== Early life and career ==
Sadhu Kokila was born as Sahaya Sheelan on 24 March 1966 into a Tamil Nadar Christian family of Natesh and Mangala in Bangalore in the Indian State of Mysore (now Karnataka). He was born to a family of musicians; his father was a violinist in the music band of Karnataka Police Department, while his mother and sister were playback singers. Sadhu Kokila's brother Layendra is also an actor and music director. Kokila studied in St. Joseph's Indian High School, Bangalore. He was given the stage name Sadhu Kokila by Upendra, the director of Sheelan's debut film Shhh!.

Kokila began his career as a musician after he was taken to musician Kasturi Shankar by his brother.

== Personal life ==
Kokila married Saleena in 1993. They have two children.

== Filmography ==
Key
†	Denotes films that have not yet been released

=== Kannada films ===
Year	Film	Role	Notes
1993	Shhh!	"Kung Fu" Kannan	Cameo appearance
1995	Om	Shankar	
1995	Operation Antha	Drummer	
1996	Shreemathi Kalyana		
1996	Anuraga Spandana		
1997	O Mallige	Mustafa	
1997	Nee Mudida Mallige		
1997	Jackie Chan		
1997	Ganga Yamuna		
1997	Central Jail		
1998	Sorry		
1998	Hello Yama	Chitragupta	
1998	Yamalokadalli Veerappan		
1998	Yaare Neenu Cheluve		
1998	Goonda Matthu Police		
1999	Tarikere Erimele		
1999	A. K. 47	Sadhu	
1999	Bombat Halva		
1999	Channappa Channegowda	Singlike Gowda	
1999	Mr. X		
1999	Khalanayaka		
1999	Aaha		
2000	Kiladi		
2000	Ekangi	Thief	
2000	Ticket Tickets		
2000	Thimmaraya		
2000	Preethsu Thappenilla		
2000	O Nanna Nalle		
2000	Mundaithe Oora Habba		
2000	Jee Boomba		
2001	Vaalee	Vicky	
2001	Jipuna Nanna Ganda	Vikram	
2001	Usire		
2001	Rusthum		
2001	Rashtrageethe		
2001	Premakke Sai		
2001	Maduve Aagona Baa		
2001	Jodi		
2001	Bava Bamaida		
2002	Law and Order		
2002	Mutthu		
2002	Kodanda Rama		
2002	Chandu	Thimma	
2002	Prema Khaidi		
2002	Nagarahavu	Vishwanath Sharma	
2002	Ninne Preethisuve		
2002	Dhruva		
2002	Dhumm		
2002	Naanu Naane		
2002	Thavarige Baa Thangi		
2003	Laali Haadu	Thippeswamy	
2003	Neenandre Ishta	Mandi	
2003	Neenilde Nanu Illa Kane	Gopi	
2003	Raktha Kanneeru	Kantha's uncle	Also director
2003	Mani		
2003	Thayi Illada Thabbali		
2003	Mane Magalu		
2003	Gokarna		
2003	Kiccha		
2003	Nanhendthi Maduve		
2004	Rowdy Aliya	SP Jayasimha	
2004	Saagari		
2004	Y2K		
2004	Mellusire Savigaana		
2004	Rama Krishna	Ranganna	
2004	Maurya		
2004	Kalasipalya	Jacky	
2004	Santhosha	Doctor	
2004	Kanchana Ganga		
2004	Omkara		
2004	Durgi		
2004	Nimma Preethiya Huduga		
2005	Anna Thangi	"Chimpanzee"	
2005	Gowramma	A photographer	
2005	Rakshasa		Also director
2005	Nammanna	Journalist	
2005	Sakha Sakhi		
2005	Swamy		
2005	Auto Shankar		
2005	Thunta		
2005	Ayya		
2006	Mandya	Subramanya	
2006	Hubballi		
2006	Aishwarya	SP Menshina Koy	
2006	Suntaragaali	"Machine" Raja "MBBS"	Also director
2006	Mata	Film Director	
2006	Neelakanta		
2006	Nage Habba		
2006	Odahuttidavalu		
2006	Jackpot		
2006	Thavarina Siri		
2007	Parodi		
2007	Sixer		
2007	Anatharu	Film director	Also director, screenwriter and composer
2007	Amrutha Vaani		
2007	Snehana Preethina		
2007	Hetthare Hennanne Herabeku		
2007	Prarambha		
2007	Ugadi		
2007	Masti		
2008	Meravanige		
2008	Mast Maja Maadi	Bond DK	
2008	Kaamannana Makkalu	Huliraya	
2008	PUC		
2008	Nee Tata Naa Birla		
2008	Sangama		
2008	Paramesha Panwala		
2008	Kodagana Koli Nungitha		
2008	Arjun		
2009	Lift Kodla	Bogananda Swamy	
2009	Devaru Kotta Thangi		
2009	Tabbali		
2009	Dubai Babu		
2009	Raam	Santosh	
2009	Vayuputra		
2009	Savaari		
2009	Male Barali Manju Irali		
2009	Devru		
2009	Rajani		
2009	Bhagyada Balegaara		
2009	Seena		
2009	Hatrick Hodi Maga		
2009	Kannadada Kiran Bedi		
2009	Yodha		
2009	Circus		
2010	Porki	Sadhu	
2010	Preethiya Theru		
2010	Deadly-2		
2010	Prithvi	Tirupathi	
2010	Kari Chirathe		
2010	Shourya	Jimson	
2010	Mr. Theertha		Also director
2010	Hoo		
2010	Aithalakkadi		
2010	Hendtheer Darbar		
2010	Zamana		
2010	Aithalakkadi		
2010	Veera		
2010	Ullasa Utsaha		
2010	Jothegara		
2010	O Manase		
2010	Hara		
2010	Super	Chaddi brother	
2010	Huduga Hudugi		
2010	Thipparalli Tharlegalu		
2011	Olave Mandara	Kannadiga in Gara	
2011	Kool: Sakkath Hot Maga	Sadhu Nanda	
2011	Johny Mera Naam Preethi Mera Kaam	Dr. Halappa	
2011	Manasology		
2011	Aata	Football coach	
2011	Achchu Mechchu		
2011	Shakthi		
2011	Sogasugara		
2011	Bodyguard		
2011	Kalla Malla Sulla		
2011	90		
2011	Police Story 3		Also director
2011	Hudugaru		
2011	Murali Meets Meera		
2011	Sanju Weds Geetha		
2011	Rama Rama Raghurama		
2011	Aaptha		
2011	Kanteerava		
2012	Ko Ko		
2012	Toofan		
2012	Romeo	Pandu	
2012	Breaking News	Roland Richard Louis	
2012	Jaanu		
2012	Mr. 420	SI Kashinath	
2012	Lucky	Sadhu	
2012	Snehitaru		
2012	Gokula Krishna		
2012	Yaare Koogadali	Shishupala	SIIMA Award for Best Comedian (Kannada)
2012	Samsaradalli Golmal		
2012	Rambo		
2012	Modala Minchu		
2012	Lady Boss		
2012	Narasimha		
2012	Parijatha		
2013	Victory	Sadhu Gowda	
2013	Bhajarangi		
2013	Dilwala		
2013	Googly	Musthafa	Nominated, SIIMA Award for Best Comedian
2013	Sweety Nanna Jodi		
2013	Loosegalu		
2013	Auto Raja		
2013	Myna	Beggar in train	
2013	Chandra	Andy Roberts	Bilingual film
2013	Ninnindale	Lucky	
2013	Election		
2013	Bachchan	Jewellery store staff	
2013	Aane Pataaki	Chinnadappa	
2013	Madarangi		
2013	Devarane		
2013	Bangari		
2013	Khatarnak		
2013	Chaddi Dosth	Khadim	
2013	Shravani Subramanya	Govinda	
2013	Agamya		
2013	Ambara		
2013	Brindavana		
2013	Silk Sakkath Hot		
2013	Bidalare Endu Ninna		
2013	Nam Duniya Nam Style		
2013	Bulbul		
2013	Chathrigalu Saar Chathrigalu		
2013	Parari		
2014	Maanikya	Veeraprathapa Simha	
2014	Mr. and Mrs. Ramachari	Manche Gowda	IIFA Award for Best Comedian (Kannada); Nominated, SIIMA Award for Best Comedian (Kannada)
2014	Chandralekha		
2014	Brahma	Sadhu	
2014	Gajakesari	Chuncha	
2014	Drishya	restaurant customer	Cameo appearance
2014	Love Is Poison		
2014	Power	Kidney Kamangi	
2014	Savaari 2		
2014	Tirupathi Express	Indrajala	
2014	Nanu Hemanth Avalu Sevanthi		
2014	Ambareesha		
2014	Namaste Madam		
2014	Super Ranga		Also director
2014	Paramashiva		
2014	Panganama		
2014	Rose		
2014	Jai Lalitha		
2014	Agraja		
2014	Rangan Style		
2014	Love Show		
2014	Saval		
2014	Kalyanamasthu		
2014	Navarangi		
2014	Nage Bomb		
2015	Ond Chance Kodi		
2015	Mythri		
2015	Ranna	Bhaskar	
2015	Buguri	Linga	
2015	Aatagara	Sadhu Maharaj	
2015	Mr. Airavata	Bahubali	
2015	1st Rank Raju	Shani Kapoor	
2015	Cigarette		
2015	Rathaavara		
2015	Ramleela		
2015	Vamshodharaka		
2015	Mana Mecchida Bangaru		
2015	Ganga		
2015	7 (Seven)		
2015	A 2nd Hand Lover		
2015	Luv U Alia		
2015	RX Soori		
2015	Male		
2015	Bullet Basya		
2015	Vajrakaya		
2015	Mrugashira		
2015	Rebel		
2015	KRishna		
2015	Raja Rajendra		
2015	Siddhartha		
2015	Khushi Khushiyagi		
2016	Kathe Chitrakathe Nirdeshana Puttanna		
2016	Maduveya Mamatheya Kareyole		
2016	Mast Mohabbat		
2016	Viraat		
2016	Shivalinga	Bill Gates	
2016	Bhale Jodi	Gautham (drunkard software engineer)	Also director, composer
2016	U the End A		
2016	Supari Surya		
2016	Jai Maruthi 800	Kalberke	
2016	Chakravyuha	Sadhu	
2016	Style King	Sadhu	
2016	Brahma Vishnu Maheshwara		
2016	Jaggu Dada	Sorcerer	
2016	Jigarthanda	Acting teacher	
2016	Lakshmana		
2016	Zoom	M. Janakiram "MJ"	Nominated, Filmfare Award for Best Supporting Actor – Kannada
2016	Bhujanga		
2016	Deal Raja		
2016	Kotigobba 2	Bus passenger	Bilingual film
2016	Crazy Boy	Drama teacher	
2016	Happy Birthday		
2016	Mungaru Male 2	Nandini's uncle	Nominated, SIIMA Award for Best Comedian
2016	Mandya to Mumbai		
2016	Sundaranga Jaana		
2016	Naanu Mattu Varalakshmi		
2016	Nagarahavu		
2016	Jaguar		
2016	Golisoda		
2016	Apoorva		
2016	Kala Bhairava		
2016	Jessie		
2016	Ricky		
2017	Lee		
2017	Hai		
2017	Raajakumara	Anthony Gonsales	
2017	Real Police		
2017	Bangara s/o Bangarada Manushya		
2017	Dandupalya 2		
2017	Bharjari	Loveguru	
2017	Chamak		
2017	Mahanubhavaru		
2017	Mufti	Model	
2017	Upendra Matte Baa	Atmananda	
2018	Kanaka		
2018	Sanjeeva		
2018	Preethiya Raayabhari		
2018	O Premave		
2018	Johnny Johnny Yes Papa	Dr. Halappa	
2018	Huccha 2		
2018	Seizer		
2018	Double Engine		
2018	Ayogya	Bhairathi Gundkal	
2018	Snehave Preethi		
2018	Victory 2	Sadhu Gowda	Nominated—SIIMA Award for Best Comedian – Kannada
2018	Sur Sur Batthi		
2018	Thayige Thakka Maga	Trainer of camp	
2018	Tharakasura		
2018	Looty		
2018	Orange	Kodanda	
2019	Amar	Amar's uncle	
2019	Anushka	Inspector Ajith Kumar IPS	
2019	Natasaarvabhowma	Namadev	
2019	Yajamana	Captain	SIIMA Award For Best Comedian – Kannada
2019	Londonalli Lambodhara	Sadhu	
2019	Yada Yada Hi Dharmasya		
2019	Gara		
2019	Adyaksha in America	Jimmy Carter	
2019	Bharaate	Radha's uncle	
2019	Mane Maratakkide	Raghava	
2020	Mayabazar 2016	Pataki Pandu	
2020	Drona		
2021	Yuvarathnaa	Dr. Kokila Raman	
2021	Ranam		
2021	Mugilpete		
2021	Sakath	Sadhu	
2021	Drishya 2	Dubai returned man	
2021	Arjun Gowda		
2022	James	Santhosh's assistant	
2022	Home Minister		
2022	Trikona		
2022	Mata		
2022	Triple Riding	Garuda	
2023	Love Birds		
2023	Kranti	Kranti's aide	
2023	Sreemanta		
2024	Just Pass		
2024	Night Curfew	Sadhu	
2024	Krishnam Pranaya Sakhi		
2024	Karki Nanu BA, LLB		
2024	UI	Joker	
2025	Flirt		
TBA	Mafia	Ugra Prathap	

=== Other language films ===
Years	Film	Role	Language	Notes
2001	Raa	'Triple X' Ranjith Kumar, Sridhar's friend	Telugu	Dual role
2014	Chandra	Andy Roberts	Tamil	Bilingual films
2016	Mudinja Ivana Pudi	Bus passenger	Tamil	Bilingual films
2023	Kick	Judge	Tamil	
TBA	Golmaal	TBA	Tamil	

=== As director ===
Years	Film	Notes
2003	Raktha Kanneeru	
2005	Rakshasa	
2006	Suntaragaali	
2007	Anatharu	
2008	Gange Baare Thunge Baare	
2009	Devru	
2010	Mr. Theertha	
2010	Shourya	
2011	Police Story 3	Co-director
2014	Super Ranga	
2016	Bhale Jodi	

== Discography ==
=== As composer ===
Year	Film	Notes
1993	Shhh!	
1994	Curfew	
1994	Asha Jyoti	
1994	Gandugali	
1995	Mangalya Sakshi	
1995	Savyasachi	
1995	Ohhoo	
1995	Mother India	
1995	Priya O... Priya	
1995	Bal Nan Maga	
1995	Betegara	
1995	Aata Hudugata	
1995	Thavaru Beegaru	
1995	Nighatha	
1995	Nishchithartha	
1995	Kavya	
1995	Shiva	
1995	Emergency	
1996	Ibbara Naduve Muddina Aata	
1996	Gajanura Gandu	
1996	Dhani	
1996	Shrimathi Kalyana	
1996	Simhadri	
1997	Dhairya	
1997	Jackie Chan	
1998	Hello Yama	
1998	Karnataka Police	
1998	Yamalokadalli Veerappan	
1999	No 1	
2000	Ticket Tickets	
2000	Kiladi	
2000	Swalpa Adjust Madkolli	
2001	Jipuna Nanna Ganda	
2002	Majestic	
2002	H2O	
2002	Kitty	
2003	Laali Haadu	
2003	Raktha Kanneeru	
2003	Daasa	
2004	Rowdy Aliya	Guest composer
2004	Darshan	
2004	Y2K	
2005	Rakshasa	Karnataka State Film Award for Best Music Director
2005	Masala	
2005	Deadly Soma	
2005	Sakha Sakhi	
2006	Suntaragaali	
2006	Thangigagi	
2008	Inthi Ninna Preethiya	Karnataka State Film Award for Best Music Director
2008	Kodagana Koli Nungitha	
2009	Devru	
2009	Jaaji Mallige	
2010	Aithalakkadi	
2010	Hendtheer Darbar	
2010	Shourya	
2011	Aata	
2011	Sanju Weds Geetha	Background score only
2011	Police Story 3	Background score only
2012	Edegarike	Also playback singer for song "Neenondu Mugiyada Mouna"; Udaya Film Award for Best Male Playback Singer
2013	Myna	Background score only
2013	Tony	
2013	Khatarnak	
2015	Rathavara	
2016	Bhale Jodi	
2016	Golisoda	Background score only
2016	Kiragoorina Gayyaligalu	
2016	Masti Gudi	
2017	Uppi Rupee	
2018	Rajasimha	Background score only

== Awards and nominations ==
Karnataka State Film Awards

- 2004–05: Best Music Director: Rakshasa
- 2007–08: Best Music Director: Inthi Ninna Preethiya

South Indian International Movie Awards

- 2011: Best Comedian: Hudugaru
- 2012: Best Comedian: Yaare Koogadali

IIFA Utsavam

- 2016: Best Performance In A Comic Role: Mr. and Mrs. Ramachari

South Indian International Movie Awards

- 2019: Best Comedian: Yajamana
