= Doddanna =

Indian actor

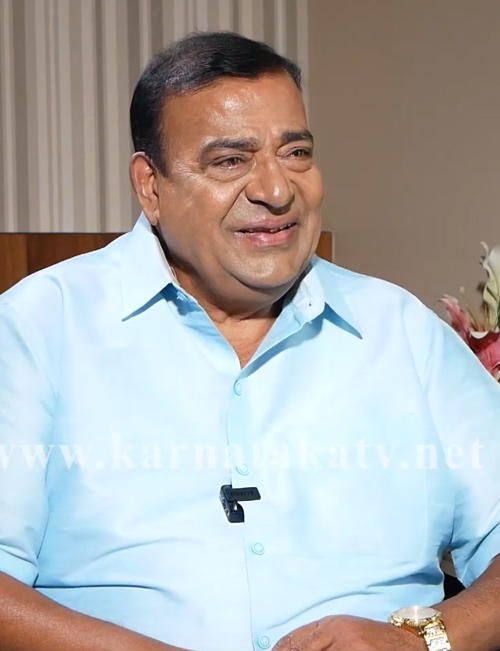
- Doddanna in 2022
- Born: Sugurappa Doddanna; 11 November 1949 (age 76); Arasikere, Mysore State, Dominion of India
- Occupation: Actor
- Years active: 1981–present
- Spouse: Shantha (m. 1975)
- Children: 3
- Relatives: K. C. Veerendra Puppy (son-in-law)

Sugurappa Doddanna (born 11 November 1949) is an Indian actor in the Kannada film industry and former politician. As an actor, he has appeared in more than 800 films. He started his career as a theatre actor. During this time, he entered the Kannada film industry as a character actor. Doddanna became noted for playing comedic characters.

== Early life ==
Doddanna was born on 11 November 1949 in Arasikere, a town in the Hassan district of the erstwhile Mysore State (now Karnataka), to Nanjamma and Sugurappa. The youngest son in the family, Doddanna belongs to the Lingayat community. He was named after his grandfather, Kadle Doddappa. Doddanna spent his formative years in Santhepete near Arasikere. He completed his middle school and high school in Arasikere. He had two older brothers: Basavaraj and Rachanna.

== Career ==
Doddanna's career as an actor took off after he appeared as a girl in a play titled Civil Marriage. He soon joined the Vighneshwara Kala Sangha, an amateur theatre group based in the Hassan district, alongwith his brothers. He recalled, "We performed across the state and acted in some of the finest plays. This gave me confidence and strengthened my resolve to become an actor." In 1968, he joined the Visvesvaraya Iron and Steel Plant (VISL), then named Mysore Iron Works, as a welder. With his friends there, he formed the Gandharva Ranga, a theatre group, that regularly travelled to watch plays directed by B. V. Karanth, Girish Karnad and Chandrashekhara Kambara. During this time, he was offered his first film role by director S. Siddalingaiah in Koodi Balidare Swarga Sukha (1981). However, he continued with the VISL till 1988.

Doddanna would go on to portray negative-shaded characters, politicians, policemen and other character archetypes throughout the 1980s and the following decades. He also became noted for playing comedic roles. He appeared in films such as Ajeya (1985), Sangliyana (1988), Anjada Gandu (1988), Shiva Mecchida Kannappa (1988) and C.B.I. Shankar (1989). His role as the grandfather of Malashri's character in Belli Modagalu (1992) received praise. Doddanna also appeared in Tamil films such as Jai (2004) and Ainthaam Padai (2009).

=== As politician ===
Doddanna joined the Janata Party in 2004, ahead of the general election. He contested to the Lok Sabha from Shimoga, and eventually lost of Sarekoppa Bangarappa. He later joined the Bharatiya Janata Party, and subsequently its breakaway faction Karnataka Janata Paksha, in 2012. However, he was denied ticket to contest the 2013 Karnataka Legislative Assembly election from Turuvekere.

== Partial filmography ==
=== Films ===
- All films are in Kannada unless otherwise noted.

List of Doddanna Kannada film credits
Year	Title	Role	Notes
1981	Koodi Balidare Swarga Sukha		
1981	Yediyuru Siddhalingeshwara		
1982	Parajitha		
1983	Kranthiyogi Basavanna	Maduvarasa	
1984	Onde Raktha		
1984	Kaliyuga		
1984	Huli Hejje		
1985	Veeradhi Veera		
1985	Thayiya Hone		
1985	Mavano Aliyano		
1985	Thayi Kanasu	Papanna	
1985	Masanada Hoovu		
1985	Ajeya		Bi-lingual film (Kannada, Tamil)
1986	Ratha Sapthami	Srikantaiah	
1986	Prema Gange		
1986	Namma Oora Devathe		
1987	Shruthi Seridaaga	Dr. Jeena Das	
1987	Sangrama		
1987	Ondu Muttina Kathe	Physician	
1987	Nyayakke Shikshe		
1987	Karunamayi		
1987	Kurukshetra		
1988	Shiva Mecchida Kannappa	Doddayya	
1988	Sangliyana	Kalle Gowda	
1988	Sambhavami Yuge Yuge		
1988	Ranadheera	Lawyer	
1988	Nava Bharatha		
1988	Matru Devo Bhava		
1988	Maha Dasohi Sharana Basava		
1988	Jana Nayaka	Nugeerappa	
1988	Dharma Pathni		
1988	Daada		
1988	Brahma Vishnu Maheshwara		
1988	Anjada Gandu	Gopala	
1989	Deva		
1989	Anjana Gandu		
1989	Thayigobba Tharle Maga		
1989	Rudra		
1989	Raja Yuvaraja		
1989	Poli Huduga		
1989	Parashuram	M. K. Nayak	
1989	Narasimha	Rudrappa	
1989	Kindari Jogi		
1989	Jockey		
1989	Indrajith		
1989	Idu Saadhya	Constable Sannamani	
1989	Hrudaya Geethe		
1989	Hongkongnalli Agent Amar		
1989	Gajapathi Garvabhanga		
1989	C.B.I. Shankar	SI Galappa Doddamani	
1989	Avane Nanna Ganda	Parandhamaiah's son	
1989	Adrushta Rekhe		
1990	Nambidre Nambi Bitre Bidi		
1990	Swarna Samsara	Judge	Cameo appearance
1990	Shivashankar	Yogi	
1990	Rudra Thandava		
1990	Rani Maharani		
1990	Ranabheri		
1990	Ramarajyadalli Rakshasaru	Kalinga Rao	
1990	Prathap	Bhairava	
1990	Poli Kitty		
1990	Nigooda Rahasya		
1990	Nenne Nanna Jeeva		
1990	Mathe Hadilu Kothe		
1990	Challenge Gopalakrishna		
1990	Bhale Chathura	Santosh's father	
1990	Baare Nanna Muddina Rani		
1990	Ashoka Chakra	Home Minister Ranganath	
1990	Abhimanyu		
1990	Aavesha	CI S. Mrutyunjaya	
1990	Thrinethra	Rajendra Prasad	
1991	Sathya Sandesha		
1991	Shivayogi Akkamahadevi		
1991	Varalaga Bete		
1991	Sundara Kanda		
1991	Sri Nanjudeshwara Mahime		
1991	SP Bhairavi		
1991	Shivaraj		
1991	Shanti Kranti		
1991	Rollcall Ramakrishna	Sripathi	
1991	Readymade Ganda		
1991	Shivanaga		
1991	Ranachandi		
1991	Ramachaari	Astrologer	Guest appearance
1991	Nanagoo Hendthi Beku		
1991	Kollur Raja		
1991	Kitturina Huli		
1991	Kaliyuga Bheema		
1991	Kalla Malla		
1991	Kadana		
1991	Hosamane Aliya		
1991	Hatyakanda		
1991	Gandanige Takka Hendati		
1991	Elukoti Marthanda Bhairavi		
1991	Central Rowdy		
1991	Aranyadalli Abhimanyu		
1991	Anantha Rakshaka		
1991	Putta Hendthi		
1992	Vajrayudha		
1992	Bharjari Gandu		
1992	Prajegalu Prabhugalu		
1992	Kranti Gandhi		
1992	Belli Kalungura		
1992	Solillada Saradara	Diwan	
1992	Shivanaga		
1992	Shakthi Yukthi		
1992	Putta Hendthi		
1992	Police Lockup		
1992	Police File		
1992	Obbaringintha Obbaru		
1992	Mysore Jaana	Hanumanthappa	
1992	Gharshane		
1992	Chithralekha		
1992	Belli Modagalu		
1992	Belli Kalungura		
1992	Aatma Bandahna		
1992	Alli Ramachari Illi Brahmachari		
1993	Navibbaru Namagibbaru		
1993	Muddina Maava		
1993	Midida Hrudayagalu		
1993	Kollura Sri Mookambika		
1993	Kempaiah IPS		
1993	Kalyana Rekhe		
1993	Jailor Jagannath	Halappa Bhimappa Bellulli	
1993	Gadibidi Ganda	Mohana's father	
1993	Bombat Huduga		
1993	Alimayya		
1993	Karulina Koogu		
1994	Yarigu Helbedi	Doddanna	
1994	Vijaya Kankana	Police commissioner Chakravarthy	
1994	Mutthanna		
1994	Makkala Sakshi		
1994	Lockup Death	Lawyer Kapinipathi	
1994	Karulina Koodu		
1994	Indrana Gedda Narendra		
1994	Hongirana		
1994	Hettha Karulu		
1994	Halunda Tavaru		
1994	Gopi Kalyana		
1994	Gold Medal	Bhatti Bhaira	
1994	Curfew		
1994	Bhairava		
1994	Apoorva Samsara		
1995	Mojugara Sogasugara		
1995	Chiranjeevi Rajegowda		
1995	Gadibidi Aliya		
1996	Appaji	Home Minister	
1996	Thavarina Thottilu	Thimmayya	
1996	Shiva Sainya	Mallayya	
1996	Hetthavaru	Urlinganna	
1996	Circle Inspector	Doddaiah	
1996	Jeevanadhi	Ravishankar Shastry	
1996	Aadithya	Yeluru Venkata Ramana	
1997	Ganga Yamuna		
1997	Bhanda Alla Bahadur		
1997	Ellaranthalla Nanna Ganda	Shankarappa	
1998	Yaare Neenu Cheluve		
1998	Megha Bantu Megha		
1998	Hello Yama	Yama	Also playback singer
1998	Preethsod Thappa	Puttaswamy	
1999	Bombat Halva		
1999	Chandrodaya	Sunil Kumar's boss	
1999	Naanu Nanna Hendthiru	Sriram's father	
1999	Tuvvi Tuvvi Tuvvi		
1999	Aaha Nanna Maduveyanthe	Lakshmipathi	
1999	Suryavamsha	Dodda Kanakamurthy's uncle	
2000	Galate Aliyandru		
2000	Nan Hendthi Chennagidale	Man on donkey	Cameo appearance
2000	Dandanayaka		
2000	Kadlimatti Station Master		
2000	Ticket Tickets	Doddanna	
2001	Halappa		
2001	Kurigalu Saar Kurigalu	Veerappa	
2001	Kanasugara		
2001	Premakke Sai		
2001	Kalla Police		
2001	Halu Sakkare	Govindaiah	
2002	Sri Krishna Sandhana		
2002	Neela Megha Shyama	Doddarasikere Doddanna	
2002	Jamindaarru		
2002	Dakota Express	Ugranarasimha	
2002	Kambalahalli		
2002	Super Police		
2002	Thavarige Baa Thangi	Doddanna	
2003	Laali Haadu		
2003	Pakka Chukka	Meena's father	
2003	Neenandre Ishta	Vishwa's brother-in-law	
2003	Bangalore Bundh		
2003	Mane Magalu		
2003	Kasu Iddone Basu		
2003	Raktha Kanneeru		
2003	Chandra Chakori	Gajendrappa	
2003	Love Passagali	Chikkanna	
2003	Ondagona Baa		
2003	Re Swalpa Bartheera		
2004	Jai	College principal	Tamil film
2004	Rowdy Aliya	Malini Devi's brother	
2004	Hasige Iddashtu Kalu Chachu		
2004	Durgi		
2004	Rama Krishna	Shankrappa	
2004	Maurya	Broker	
2004	Trin Trin	Mahadevaiah	
2005	Maharaja	Naganna	
2005	Vishnu Sena	Gangadharaiah	
2005	Gowramma	Shankaranna	
2005	Auto Shankar		
2005	Nanna Love Madthiya		
2005	Anna Thangi	Doddanna	
2005	Sakha Sakhi		
2006	Shri	Constable	
2006	Mata	Yama	Cameo appearance
2006	Gopi		
2006	Hatavadi		
2006	Sevanthi Sevanthi		
2006	Ajay	Home Minister	
2006	Thavarina Siri		
2006	Gandugali Kumara Rama		
2006	Aishwarya	Srikanthe Gowda	
2006	Sirivantha	Kondaiah	
2006	Ravi Shastri		
2006	Savira Mettilu		
2006	Tenali Rama		
2006	Devi		
2007	Thayiya Madilu		
2007	Pallakki	Vishwanath	
2007	Amrutha Vaani		
2007	Sneha Parva		
2007	Snehana Preetina		
2007	Maathaad Maathaadu Mallige	Kaala	
2008	Mandakini		
2008	Ganesha Matthe Banda		
2008	Nee Tata Naa Birla		
2008	Kaamannana Makkalu	Kaamanna	
2008	Akasha Gange		
2008	Bandhu Balaga	Devanna	
2008	Jnana Jyothi Sri Siddaganga		
2009	Chickpete Sachagalu		
2009	Veera Madakari	Home Minister	
2009	Chellidaru Sampigeya	Made Gowda	
2009	Ainthaam Padai	Dhanushkodi	Tamil film
2009	Bhagyada Balegaara		
2009	Rajani	Pandu	
2009	Male Bille		
2009	Raam	Dodda Mallayya	
2010	Krishna Nee Late Aagi Baaro		
2010	Bombat Car	Priya's grandfather	
2010	Tharangini		
2010	Mr. Theertha	Theertha's maternal uncle	
2010	Preethi Andre Ishtena		
2011	Rama Rama Raghurama		
2011	Uyyale		
2011	Sanju Weds Geetha	Prison guard	
2011	Hori		
2011	90		
2011	Sogasugara		
2011	Maryade Ramanna		
2012	Tsunami		
2012	Bheema Theeradalli	Chandappa	
2012	Katari Veera Surasundarangi	Chitragupta	
2012	Dandupalya	Advocate Bhat	
2012	Modala Minchu		
2012	Gokula Krishna		
2012	Krantiveera Sangolli Rayanna	Venkata Rao	
2012	Dakota Picture	Lachchanna	
2013	Brindavana		
2014	Agraja		
2014	Savaari 2		
2014	Panganama	Gowda	
2014	Power	Mallesh	
2014	Super Ranga	Minister	
2014	Neenade Naa		
2015	Shivam		
2015	Goolihatti	Doddanna	
2016	Kathe Chitrakathe Nirdeshana Puttanna	Film producer	
2016	CBI Sathya		
2016	Sa		
2018	Kanoorayana		
2018	Aatagadharaa Siva	Jangayya	Telugu film
2018	Ambi Ning Vayassaytho		Guest appearance
2019	Kaddu Mucchi		
2021	Rajatantra	Home minister	
2021	Kotigobba 3	Police officer	Cameo
2024	Karataka Damanaka	Villager	
2024	Santhosha Sangeetha		
2026	Raktha Kashmira		
2026	Urabba		

== Television ==
List of Doddanna television credits
Year	Title	Role	Notes	Ref.
2016	Weekend with Ramesh	Guest		
2017	Bharjari Comedy	Judge		
2021	Raja Rani	Guest	Finale episode	
2022	Bombat Bhojana	Guest		
2022–2024	Kendasampige	Keshav Prasad		

== Awards ==
- Karnataka State Film Award for Best Supporting Actor - 1998-99 Winner for Tuvvi Tuvvi Tuvvi
- South Indian International Movie Awards - 2012 Nominated—SIIMA Award for Best Actor in a Supporting Role for Katari Veera Surasundarangi
- Filmfare Awards South - 2019 Nominated—Filmfare Award for Best Supporting Actor – Telugu for Aatagadharaa Siva
- 6th Arsikere Taluk Kannada Sahithya Sammelana President - 2016
