= Raktha Kanneeru =

2003 film by Sadhu Kokila

- DVD cover
- Directed by: Sadhu Kokila
- Screenplay by: Upendra
- Story by: Tiruvarur K. Thangaraj
- Produced by: Munirathna
- Starring: Upendra; Ramya Krishna; Abhirami
- Cinematography: Krishna Kumar
- Edited by: Lakshmana Reddy
- Music by: Sadhu Kokila
- Release date: 18 September 2003
- Running time: 149 minutes
- Country: India
- Language: Kannada

Raktha Kanneeru (transl. Tears of Blood) is a 2003 Indian Kannada-language directed by Sadhu Kokila, starring Upendra and Ramya Krishna. The film was produced by Munirathna and was later dubbed in Telugu. The screenplay and dialogues were written by Upendra and the music was composed by Sadhu Kokila.

Though a remake of the 1954 Tamil film Ratha Kanneer, the director claimed that his film was based on a Kannada play which was later adapted in Tamil as a play and subsequently into the 1954 film. However, the claim was found to be false since it was noticed that the play Kaalachakra penned by T. N. Balakrishna was actually based on the Tamil play Ratha Kaneeer - making it the oldest version of all. Upon release, the film was successful at the box office and was the highest grosser of the year. It was followed by a spiritual sequel titled Katari Veera Surasundarangi, released in 2012.

== Plot ==
Mohan is a rich guy who returns from abroad after completing his studies, but he is very arrogant towards people who are below his financial status and even towards his own mother. He gets attracted to a local prostitute Kantha and even submits all his riches and property to her. On his mother's insistence he marries a girl, Chandra, who is his cousin and a traditional village girl. On his first night Mohan gets to find out she is not of his culture and leaves for Kantha. Gradually he loses all of his wealth and is left only with his house. Mohan gets addicted to alcohol and Kantha so much that he doesn't even attend his mother's funeral and perform her last rites which are carried out by his friend Balu.

Balu advises Mohan many times to mend his ways but Mohan turns down all his advice. Gradually, Mohan is affected by leprosy, and with no money left for his treatment, Kantha throws him out of her house. Due to a heavy storm, Mohan loses one of his legs and eyesight and eventually has to make do by begging, and one day he reaches out to his wife Chandra who now works in a house as a maid. Neither recognise each other as Mohan has a deformed appearance and cannot see her. But she feeds him daily out of humanity.

Searching for Mohan, his friend Balu comes to Chandra, and during their conversation, the trio recognise each other. Mohan asks Chandra and Balu to marry each other so that Chandra doesn't need to lead a pitiful life. He also asks Balu to establish his statues in the city in the deformed form so that persons like him can take his life as an example and mend their ways to lead a happy life. After so many years, Balu and Chandra are shown at Mohan's statue, crying in his memory.

== Cast ==
- Upendra as Mohan
- Ramya Krishna as Kantha
- Abhirami as Chandra
- Kumar Bangarappa as Balu
- Jyothilakshmi as Kantha's mother
- GV Sharada as Mohan's mother
- MN Suresh as Mohan's assistant
- Doddanna as producer
- M. S. Umesh as producer's assistant
- Bank Janardhan as Police inspector
- Sadhu Kokila as Kantha's uncle
- J. V. Somayajulu as Chandra's father
- Honnavalli Krishna as wannabe hero
- Kota Srinivasa Rao as landlord asking questions
- Sudhakar as landlord's son
- Kallu Chidambaram as beggar
- Pankaja as actress
- Shrishailan
- Dr. Nagesh as doctor

== Production ==
The film was originally set to be directed by Shivamani, but he was replaced by Sadhu Kokila, making his directorial debut.

== Soundtrack ==
The music was composed by Sadhu Kokila. The songs "Navile Navile" and "Ee Deshadalli" (with the tune of the Hindi song "Kaliyon Ka Chaman") were not featured in the film.

Title	Singers	Lyricist
"Danger"	Hemanth Kumar	Upendra
"Baa Baaro Rasika"	Sowmya Raoh, Upendra	M. N. Vyasa Rao
"Jaana Jaana"	Arif Ali, Nanditha	Bhangeeranga
"Kanneeridhu Raktha Kanneeridhu"	Rajesh Krishnan	Upendra
"Navile Navile"	Nandita, Rajesh Krishnan	Upendra
"Ee Deshadalli"	Suresh Peters	Upendra

== Reception ==
Raktha Kanneeru's BKT (Bangalore-Kolar-Tumkur) distribution rights were sold at a record price of ₹1.6 crore. The film went on to break many opening box office records upon release. From Bangalore alone, the film collected a share of more than ₹1 crore in its first week. Indiainfo wrote "Overall a good film that rests completely on Upendra's shoulders". Reviewing the Telugu-dubbed version, The Hindu wrote, "Upendra's performance is very good, he lives the role. Unfortunately, the dubbing voice and the accent used for him sound artificial". Jeevi of Idlebrain wrote, "This film is a typical Upendra film. His histrionics and the dialogues written to him are the plus points".

== Legacy ==
The film's song "Baa Baaro Rasika" inspired a 2004 film of same name.

== Future ==
The film was followed by a semi sequel titled Katari Veera Surasundarangi released in 2012. A 3D romantic fantasy film, it was partly a sequel to Raktha Kanneeru. It was also the first full-length 3D film in Kannada cinema. Upendra reprises his role of the highly educated rich-man turned beggar Mohan now in hell, where he meets his look alike gangster son (Upendra again) who is killed in a gang war. The film tells the story of how Mohan's son falls in love with Indra's daughter Indraja (Ramya) in Indraloka (heaven) and how he faces the challenges of Brahma, Yama and other Devatas of Indraloka to marry Indraja. The film was hugely successful although not as much as its predecessor.
