= Golmaal (2012 film) =

- Official poster
- Directed by: Pramod Chakravarthy
- Written by: Pramod Chakravarthy
- Produced by: Sunitha Nagaraj
- Starring: Vijay Raghavendra; Shubha Poonja
- Cinematography: R. Giri
- Edited by: M Thirupathi Reddy
- Music by: Radhe Krish
- Production company: Anaji Films
- Release date: 26 October 2012
- Country: India
- Language: Kannada

Golmaal is a 2012 Indian Kannada-language comedy film directed by Pramod Chakravarthy in his directorial debut and starring Vijay Raghavendra and Shubha Poonja.

== Cast ==
- Vijay Raghavendra as Chakravarthy
- Shubha Poonja as Preethi
- Rangayana Raghu
- Petrol Prasanna
- Tabla Nani
- Sanketh Kashi

== Production ==
Pramod Chakravarthy previously worked as one of the directors for Sugreeva (2010). he film was initially thought to be a remake of Gol Maal (1979).

== Reception ==
A critic from Rediff.com gave the film a rating of one out of five stars and wrote that "Golmaal is a sheer waste of time". A critic from IANS opined that "Golmaal is disappointing to the core".
