= Bengaluru Underworld =

- Theatrical release poster
- Directed by: P. N. Sathya
- Produced by: G. Anand
- Starring: Aditya; Paayal Radhakrishna; Daniel Balaji
- Music by: Anoop Seelin
- Release date: 10 March 2017
- Running time: 1 hr 52 minutes
- Country: India
- Language: Kannada

Bengaluru Underworld is a 2017 Indian Kannada crime drama film directed by P. N. Sathya. It stars Aditya in the lead role. Paayal Radhakrishna and Daniel Balaji feature in supporting roles.

== Plot ==
Ram/Maalik (Aditya), an underworld don, wants to be the king in Bangalore. However, some people in the other gang do not want that to happen. He fights back until he obtains the position. How he gained control of the area with everyone supporting him in whatever he does is the entire story.

== Cast ==
- Aditya as Ram/Maalik
- Paayal Radhakrishna as Sirisha
- Daniel Balaji as ACP Thomas

== Soundtrack ==
Bengaluru Underworld

Soundtrack album by Anoop Seelin
- Released: February 2017
- Genre: Feature film soundtrack
- Length: 8:06

Anoop Seelin composed music for the film's soundtrack. The album consists of two soundtracks.

Track listing
| No. | Title | Singer(s) | Length |
|---|---|---|---|
| 1. | "Yeh Maalik" | Krishna Beura, Mohan, Srinivas, and Vijay Urs | 3:51 |
| 2. | "Naane Neenu" | Indu Nagaraj and Siddharth Belmannu | 4:16 |

== Reception ==
Bengaluru Underworld, a Kannada action flick, stirred up a variety of critical takes upon its release. Vijaya Karnataka found it a gritty dive into the city’s underbelly, praising the raw energy, but hinting at a lack of polish in its storytelling. The New Indian Express was far less impressed, slamming it as "as under as it can get", with a chaotic plot and uninspired execution that failed to rise above mediocrity. Prajavani took a middle ground, noting the film’s bold attempt to portray Bengaluru’s darker side, though it felt the narrative stumbled under its own ambition. Meanwhile, The Times of India gave it a 2.5 out of 5, crediting the action sequences and Aditya’s presence, but docking points for a predictable script that did not fully captivate.
