= Kencha =

2009 Indian Kannada-language film

- Directed by: P. N. Sathya
- Written by: P. N. Sathya
- Produced by: Ramesh Yadav
- Starring: Prajwal Devaraj; Pragna
- Cinematography: P L Ravee
- Edited by: M Varman
- Music by: Rajesh Ramanath
- Production company: Ramesh Yadav Movies
- Release date: 10 July 2009
- Country: India
- Language: Kannada

Kencha is a 2009 Indian Kannada-language film directed by P. N. Sathya starring Prajwal Devaraj and Pragna in lead roles.

== Cast ==
- Prajwal Devaraj as Rahul
- Pragna as Swetha
- Sharath Lohitashwa as Pashupathy
- Lakshman
- Tilak Shekar as Ajay
- P. N. Sathya

== Music ==
Kencha

Soundtrack album by Rajesh Ramanath
- Released: 2009
- Recorded: 2009
- Genre: Feature film soundtrack
- Length: 25:31
- Language: Kannada

Official audio
- Kencha - Full Album on YouTube

Track listing
No.	Title	Singer(s)	Length
1.	"Chappale Chappale"	Gurukiran	4:36
2.	"Ommomme Ommomme"	Rajesh Krishnan, Akanksha Badami	5:37
3.	"Thumbane Thumbane"	Rajesh Krishnan, Nanditha	5:05
4.	"Hrudaya Oh Hrudaya"	Kumar Sanu	5:05
5.	"Praya Thumba"	Sinchan Dixith, Santhosh	5:08
Total length:			25:31

== Reception ==
=== Critical response ===
The New Indian Express wrote "the director introduces a flashback scene and explains that Rahul is the son of Pashupathy and under what circumstances they got separated. The climax is how Rahul teaches Ajay a lesson. It is unfortunate that music director Rajesh Ramanathan has also failed in his assignment. All in all, a film that you can do without". RG Vijayasathy of Rediff.com scored the film at 1.5 out of 5 stars and says "Rajesh Ramanath's music is ordinary. PL.Ravi remains the only technician whose work is worth mentioning. Director Sathya proves that he is a better actor than a writer-director as you need a lot of patience to watch Kencha". B S Srivani of Deccan Herald wrote "Lohitashwa is good, Satya narcissistic and Tilak, the less said the better. Rajesh Ramnath’s tunes and some worthless lyrics compete for the major irritant spot. Camerawork is ok.This ‘Kencha’ will definitely have people expecting some value for their money, see red".
