= Pramod Chakravarthy (actor) =

Indian actor, screenwriter and director

- Born: Srinivas
- Occupations: Actor; screenwriter; director
- Years active: 1986–present

Pramod Chakravarthy is an Indian actor, screenwriter and director known for his work in Kannada cinema.

== Career ==
In his early career, Pramod Chakravarthy worked as a hero in several films. He turned producer with Hey Nan Bheeshma Kano (2003), which was noted for having Devaraj and Tara play elderly characters.

After a career as an actor, Chakravarthy turned to direction in the late 2000s. He was the writer and one of the directors of Sugreeva (2010), which completed filming in 18 hours. His second project and first as a solo director, Golmaal (2012), was not received well by critics. He collaborated with Shiva Rajkumar for the second time for Drona (2020).

== Filmography ==
=== As actor ===
- Bala Nouke (1986)
- Prema Tapasvi (1987)
- Shakthi Yukthi (1992)
- Akka (1997)
- Thavarina Theru (1997)
- Hello Yama (1998)
- My Dear Tiger (1998)
- Jee Boomba (2000)
- Grama Devathe (2001)
- Neelambari (2001)
- Olu Saar Bari Olu (2002)...Pammi
- Hey Nan Bheeshma Kano (2003)...Seenu (also producer)
- Karnana Sampatthu (2005)
- Hudgeer Saar Hudgeeru (2005)
- Thanthra (2011)

=== As director ===
- Sugreeva (2010)
- Golmaal (2012)
- Drona (2020)
