= Daniel Balaji =

Indian film actor (1975–2024)

- Born: T. C. Balaji; 2 December 1975; Madras, Tamil Nadu, India
- Died: 29 March 2024 (aged 48); Kottivakkam, Chennai, Tamil Nadu, India
- Occupation: Actor
- Years active: 1998–2024
- Relatives: Siddalingaiah (uncle); Murali (cousin); Atharvaa (nephew)

T. C. Balaji (2 December 1975 – 29 March 2024), better known by his stage name Daniel Balaji, was an Indian actor, who predominantly worked in Tamil film industry and in some Kannada, Telugu and Malayalam films.

== Early life ==
Balaji was born in Chennai to a Telugu father (from Chittoor) and a Tamil mother (from Arcot). He studied a film direction course in Taramani film institute, Chennai. His mother and Murali's mother are sisters. His uncle is S. Siddalingaiah. His nephew is Atharvaa.

== Career ==
In 1998, Balaji began his film career as a unit production manager on the sets of Kamal Haasan's unreleased Marudhanayagam and as an assistant director for the delayed Kamarasu.

Balaji's first role was in the television serial Chithi, where he played a character named Daniel. After the success of the show, in his second serial Alaigal, director Sunder K. Vijayan, named him as Daniel Balaji based on his own character in Chithi.

His first film in Tamil was April Maadhathil, followed by a role in Kaadhal Kondein. His first major role was in Kaakha Kaakha as a police officer alongside Suriya, who played the leading role. The film, directed by Gautham Vasudev Menon, was about a squad of policemen fighting organized crime in Chennai. Balaji followed this up with another major role in Menon's next film, that of the antagonist Amudhan in the blockbuster film Vettaiyaadu Vilaiyaadu. The film starred Kamal Haasan and was a police procedural focusing on a series of murders. Balaji's portrayal of both these roles received praise.

His next film, Polladhavan, was also successful. He also acted as one of the villains in the Telugu film Chirutha and followed this up by playing the hero in Muthirai, produced by Vision Jeeva Studios.

Balaji made his debut in Malayalam cinema through Black. Later, he was cast the villain in Bhagavan (opposite Mohanlal) and Daddy Cool (opposite Mammootty).

== Death ==
Daniel Balaji died of a heart attack in Chennai on 29 March 2024, at the age of 48.

== Filmography ==
Year	Title	Role	Language	Notes
2002	April Madhathil	Suresh	Tamil	Debut film role
2003	Kaadhal Kondein	Police Inspector	Tamil	
2003	Kaakha Kaakha	Srikanth	Tamil	
2004	Black	Ezhumalai	Malayalam	
2004	Samba	Goon	Telugu	
2004	Gharshana	Srikanth	Telugu	
2006	Vettaiyaadu Vilaiyaadu	Amudhan Sukumaran	Tamil	
2006	November Rain	Majeed Ali	Malayalam	
2006	Photographer	Inspector	Malayalam	
2007	Polladhavan	Ravi	Tamil	
2007	Chirutha	Beeku	Telugu	
2009	Muthirai	Azhagu	Tamil	
2009	Bhagavan	Saifudeen	Malayalam	
2009	Daddy Cool	Siva	Malayalam	
2011	Kirataka	Seena	Kannada	
2012	Mithivedi	Asoka	Tamil	
2012	Crime Story	Shivan	Malayalam	
2012	12 Hours	Antony Raj	Malayalam	
2013	Paisa Paisa	Auto driver	Malayalam	
2014	Marumugam	Mayazhagan	Tamil	
2014	Gnana Kirukkan	Ganesan	Tamil	
2014	Shivajinagara	Mohammed Ali	Kannada	
2015	Yennai Arindhaal	Assassin	Tamil	Guest appearance
2015	Dove		Kannada	
2015	Vai Raja Vai	Randhe	Tamil	
2016	Achcham Yenbadhu Madamaiyada	Hiren	Tamil	
2016	Sahasam Swasaga Sagipo	Hiren	Telugu	
2017	Bairavaa	Kottai Veeran	Tamil	
2017	Enbathettu		Tamil	
2017	Ippadai Vellum	Chota	Tamil	
2017	Yazh	Asokan	Tamil	
2017	Maayavan	Rudran	Tamil	
2017	Bangalore Underworld	ACP Thomas	Kannada	
2018	Vidhi Madhi Ultaa	Danie	Tamil	
2018	Vada Chennai	Thambi	Tamil	
2019	Gangs of Madras	Boxy	Tamil	
2019	Bigil	Daniel	Tamil	
2021	Suryasthamayam		Telugu	
2021	Tuck Jagadish	Veerendra Naidu	Telugu	Released on Amazon Prime
2021	Anandham Vilayadum Veedu	Karuppan	Tamil	
2023	Ariyavan	Thuraipandi	Tamil	
2024	Rajakili	John	Tamil	Cameo appearance
2025	BP 180	Arnold	Tamil	Final film role; Cameo appearance; Posthumous release

=== Television ===
Year	Title	Role	Channel
2000-2001	Chithi	Daniel	Sun TV
2001-2002	Alaigal	Dharma	Sun TV
