= Shivajinagara (film) =

2014 Kannada film

- Directed by: P. N. Sathya
- Written by: Ravi Srivatsa (dialogues)
- Screenplay by: Satya PN
- Story by: K S Kumar
- Produced by: Ramu
- Starring: Duniya Vijay; Parul Yadav
- Cinematography
- Music by: Jassie Gift
- Release date: 28 February 2014
- Country: India
- Language: Kannada

Shivajinagara is a 2014 Indian Kannada-language film directed by P. N. Sathya, starring Duniya Vijay and Parul Yadav with Abhimanyu Singh, Adithya Menon, Ashish Vidyarthi and Daniel Balaji in supporting roles.

== Plot ==
The story is about an engineering student who goes all the way to protect his family and avenge his father's death. Ram (Duniya Vijay), is the protagonist. He lives with his mother, sister and her kids. His mother is the second wife and his father rarely visits the home. So Ram develops animosity towards his father. But as the story develops, the family is united and they move to Shivajinagar from Basavangudi. Raam falls for the love of the first floor tenant's daughter Pavithra (Parul Yadav). The trouble starts as Ram's father is indebted to a don called Fayaz (Ashish Vidyarthi). The only way to solve the problem is to kill all the villains.

== Cast ==
- Duniya Vijay as Ram
- Parul Yadav as Pavithra
- Abhimanyu Singh
- Adithya Menon
- Ashish Vidyarthi as Fayaz
- Avinash as Dayanand
- Daniel Balaji as Mohammed Ali

== Music ==
Shivajinagara

Soundtrack album by Jassie Gift
- Released: 2014
- Recorded: 2014
- Genre: Feature film soundtrack
- Language: Kannada

Official audio
- Shivajinagara - Full Album on YouTube

Track listing
No.	Title	Singer(s)	Length
1.	"Kariya Kariya"	Jassie Gift	3:59
2.	" Aase Aase"	Suchith Suresan	5:24
3.	"Rangeela Rangeela"	Apoorva Sridhar	4:35
4.	"Dheera Nanna Magadheeranu"	Anand	4:33
5.	"Mandya Benne Kano"	Priya Himesh	4:33

== Reception ==
=== Critical response ===
The Times of India scored the film at 2 1/2 out of 5 stars and says "While Vijay, who dons the angry young man’s hat, is a thrill to watch, Parul Yadav sizzles on screen and does justice to her romantic role. M Selvam’s camerawork is laudable". Shyam Prasad S of Bangalore Mirror scored the film at 2 1/2 out of 5 stars and wrote "Vijay and others mouth it nearly a dozen times thereby making sure no one in the audience forgets it. While Vijay goes about killing hundreds, the baddies manage to kill only one police officer and a child in the entire film. There is a death (cause unknown) and also a suicide in Shivajinagara". Sify wrote "Music by Jassie Gift is hummable. Two songs Rangeela and Aase o Aase have become chartbusters. On the whole, the movie is entertaining, particularly for those loving action sequences". A Sharadhaa of The New Indian Express wrote "Shivajinagara is likely to join movies like Majestic, Kalasipalya and countless other experiments with mafia and morals. If you are game to settle for bloodshed and brutal killing, watch Vijay in this electrifying action sequences." B S Srivani of Deccan Herald wrote "Shivajinagara can be hailed for one not-so-obvious thing: Fruits and vegetables avoid getting caught in violence of any kind in the whole film. Where is the need when there are more than 320 humans available for carving, slicing, chopping, mincing, etc? Vijay fans won’t be disappointed for sure."
