= Olu Saar Bari Olu =

- DVD cover
- Directed by: Nagendra Magudi
- Written by: Thadoor Keshav (dialogue)
- Screenplay by: Nagendra Magadi
- Story by: Thadoor Keshav (Note: Although the film is a remake, Thadoor Keshav takes credit for the story.)
- Produced by: Ananda Apagola
- Starring: Jayanthi; Ramesh Aravind; Anu Prabhakar; Mohan; Balaraj; Pramod Chakravarthy
- Cinematography: Anaji Nagaraj
- Edited by: Lakshman; Sanjeev
- Music by: Rajdev
- Production company: Sri Sangolli Rayanna Creations
- Release date: 29 October 2002
- Country: India
- Language: Kannada

Olu Saar Bari Olu (transl. Lies sir, just lies) is a 2002 Indian Kannada-language comedy film directed by Nagendra Magudi. A remake of the Marathi film Ashi Hi Banwa Banwi (1988), the film stars Jayanthi, Ramesh Aravind, Anu Prabhakar, Mohan, Balaraj and Pramod Chakravarthy. The original story itself is based on Sailesh Dey's Bengali play Joymakali Boarding, which was also made in Kannada as Bombat Hendthi (1992).

== Plot ==
Raghupati, a makeup artist for Roja, stays in his homeowner's house with his brother Pammi in Bangalore. His friends Sadanand and Balu want to stay in the house too but the homeowner doesn't let them. They come across Jayanthi Deshpande's house, who only lends her house to couples. Raghupati comes up with a plan where Sadanand and Balu come to the house dressed as Pammi's and Ragupati's wives, respectively. How they hide their identities and how they console their girlfriends forms the rest of the story.

== Cast ==
- Jayanthi as Jayanthi Deshpande
- Ramesh Aravind as Raghupati a.k.a. Olu Raghu
- Anu Prabhakar as Roja
- Mohan as Sadanand a.k.a. Chandralekha
- Balaraj as Balu a.k.a. Chitralekha
- Pramod Chakravarthy as Pammi
- Ruchita Prasad
- Hamsa
- Ushakiran
- Bank Janardhan as Raghupati and Pammi's houseowner
- Karibasavaiah
- Tennis Krishna
- Vaijanath Biradar
- M. N. Lakshmi Devi

== Production ==
The film was reported to be similar to Samayakkondu Sullu (1996) and was made with the intention to make the audience laugh for two-and-a-half hours.

== Soundtrack ==
The soundtrack was composed by Rajdev.

All lyrics are written by V. Nagendra Prasad.

Track listing
No.	Title	Singer(s)	Length
1.	"Mavane Nanna Rajane"	B. Jayashree	4:25
2.	"Ee Jaghave Ondhu Maya"	Rajdev, Hemanth	4:51
3.	"Seereyannu Hudisidare"	Sangeetha Katti, Nanditha	4:11
4.	"Prema Vasantha"	Manu, Sangeetha Katti	5:08
5.	"Olu Sir Idhella"	Hemanth, Nanditha, Rajdev	4:38
Total length:			23:13

== Reception ==
A critic from Viggy praised the performances of the cast and the film's sense of comedy while criticizing the music. The reviewer for Deccan Herald too reviewed the film positively and wrote that the film "...sure to have you splitting at the sides."

The film was a box office success.
