= Udees =

- VCD cover
- Directed by: P. N. Sathya
- Written by: P. N. Sathya
- Starring: Mayur Patel; Sonali Joshi
- Cinematography: Sundarnath Suvarna
- Edited by: Nagendra Urs
- Music by: Venkat Narayan
- Production company: Sri Maruthi Film Creations
- Release date: 3 February 2005
- Country: India
- Language: Kannada

Udees is a 2005 Indian Kannada-language action drama film directed by P. N. Sathya starring Mayur Patel and Sonali Joshi. The film was released on 3 February 2005 and was a box office failure.

== Cast ==
- Mayur Patel as Sathya
- Sonali Joshi as Sneha
- Srinivasa Murthy as Parameshwaraiah, Sathya's father
- Sathyajith as Hanumantha
- Anu Prabhakar as Seetha
- Padma Vasanthi as Parvati
- P. N. Sathya as an underworld rowdy
- Harish Rai as "Meter Baddi" Mohana
- Shekar Kotyan as Kotyan
- Dr Vijay as Seetha's fiancé
- R. Raj
- Suryakanth
- Hanumanthe Gowda
- V. Manohar in a guest appearance as music teacher
- M. S. Umesh in a guest appearance as matchmaker / priest
- Krishne Gowda in a guest appearance as Shivayya
- Prithviraj in a guest appearance as Sneha's father
- Shailaja Joshi in a guest appearance as Shivayya's wife

== Soundtrack ==
The soundtrack of the film was composed by Venkat Narayan.

Udees

Soundtrack album by Venkat Narayan
- Released: 2005
- Genre: Feature film soundtrack
- Length: 22:19
- Language: Kannada
- Label: Ashwini Recording Co
- Producer: Venkat Narayan
External audio
- Udees – Jukebox on YouTube

Track listing
No.	Title	Lyrics	Singer(s)	Length
1.	"Rukku Rukku"	Nagendra Prasad	Narayan, Swarnalatha	4:29
2.	"Yaro Yaro Ivanyaro"	Dwarki	Lakshmi, Narayan	5:07
3.	"Damaal Dichi"	Ramnarayan	Malathi, Ravivarma	3:51
4.	"Yellovo Bramha"	Thangali Nagaraj	C. Ashwath, Nanditha	3:55
5.	"Ragavee Ragavee"	Thangali Nagaraj	Harish Raghavendra, Sujatha	4:55
Total length:				22:19

== Reception ==
R. G. Vijayasarathy of Rediff.com wrote that "Udees falls flat on many counts. Quite a few sequences remind you of Hindi films like Vaastav, Garv and the Kannada film Om". A critic from Viggy.com wrote that "Story, direction and the screenplay are the real villains of the movie. The only performance worth remembering is of Mayur who has given a brilliant performance in action, dance and emotional scenes despite of shoddy script". SN Deepak of Deccan Herald wrote "The director has mixed sentiments and action well. Add some hard-hitting dialogues and we have a watchable film. The screenplay seems to have been ‘inspired’ by Hindi films. Mayur (of Mani fame) has done an action role for the first time and does a decent job. Debutante actress Sonali Joshi, as the daydreaming heroine is good."
