= Saradara =

- Directed by: P. N. Sathya
- Written by: P. N. Sathya
- Produced by: H R Rajashekhar
- Starring: Darshan; Gurleen Chopra; Srinivasa Murthy
- Cinematography: Sundarnath Suvarna
- Edited by: Nagendra Urs
- Music by: Venkat Narayan
- Production company: Nithin Films
- Release date: 3 December 2004
- Country: India
- Language: Kannada

Saradara (or Sardara) is a 2004 Indian Kannada-language action drama film directed by P. N. Sathya starring Darshan, Gurleen Chopra and Srinivasa Murthy. The film was released on 3 December 2004, and was a box office failure.

== Plot ==
Maada works as a right-handed trusted worker to Gowda, whose daughter, Priya, loves Maada. Gowda comes to know and beats Maada severely, but Priya slaps Gowda. After this, Gowda laughs and tells them he will arrange the marriage to Maada. He sends Loknath to Maada's village, and on returning, Loknath tells them the marriage cannot happen as Maada and Priya are children to Gowda. Maada avoids Priya due to this and persuades Priya to accept the marriage that Gowda brings. But since the marriage, Priya behaves very moody, and one day she vomited, which reveals she is pregnant. At this time, without knowing the truth, Gowda tells Maada he waited for this moment so as to confirm no more relationship with Priya and again beats Maada severely.

After the beating, Maada leaves for home and Priya's husband tells Gowda he never had any sexual relationship with Priya. Thereby, Gowda gets depressed even more when Priya starts shouting and telling everyone Gowda is a big cheat. Meanwhile, Loknath tells Maada he lied to Maada about being the son of Gowda because his own daughter had a son with Gowda. Gowda kept her in a secret home as nobody should know of this illegal relationship. He killed a local woman who passed by at that time, dressed her, and crushed her head with a stone to avoid people identifying her.

Loknath's daughter and her child are living in a secret home, and Gowda only sent Loknath to this secret home to threaten Loknath into telling the lie about Maada. After telling this, Loknath kills himself. Hearing all this, an angry Maada looks furious. This time, he sees Priya being chased by Gowda's rowdies, during which Maada comes between them and fights all the rowdies. At last, Gowda is threatened, but after telling him how grievous his actions were, Maada leaves without killing Gowda. Gowda is seen crying, understanding his mistakes, as Maada walks away.

== Cast ==
- Darshan as Maada
- Gurleen Chopra as Priya
- Srinivasa Murthy as Gowda, Priya's father
- Loknath
- Sathyajith
- P. N. Sathya
- Tara
- Padma Vasanthi
- Kishan Shrikanth

== Soundtrack ==
The music for the film was composed by Venkat Narayan.

Saradara

Soundtrack album by Venkat Narayan
- Released: 2004
- Genre: Feature film soundtrack
- Length: 25:07
- Language: Kannada
- Label: Anand Audio

Venkat Narayan chronology
Heart Beats (2003)	Saradara (2004)	Nalla (2004)

Track listing
No.	Title	Singer(s)	Length
1.	"Kanninalli Preethi"	Rajesh Krishnan	3:52
2.	"Pi Pi Dollu"	Rajesh Krishnan	4:02
3.	"Gili Gili"	Rajesh Krishnan	3:26
4.	"Kanada Kailai (pathos)"	K. J. Yesudas	4:38
5.	"Namma Oora"	Manu, Raju Aravind	4:45
6.	"Madhana Madhana"	Narayan, Swarnalatha	3:56
7.	"Kaanada Brahmane"	K. J. Yesudas	0:48
Total length:			25:07

== Release and reception ==
The film was released on 3 December 2004 alongside Joke Falls (2004).

A critic from Sify wrote that "The director Satya well-known for his action films has tried to say a story without much bloodshed or violence. He has tried his best to keep the audience at the edge of their seat till the last frame of the film". A critic from Deccan Herald wrote "Known as the director of action films, Sathya effectively focuses on the feudal set-up, class struggle in villages and upholds the human values in the story. Srinivasamurthy’s acting, as the respected village headman and the crooked villain, is the highlight of the film. Darshan has given a good performance. Gurleen Chopra is glamorous. Besides, director Sathya has acted in a comic role".

== Box office ==
The film was a box office failure and was notably Darshan's only failure film that year.
