= Don (2003 film) =

- DVD Cover
- Directed by: P. N. Sathya
- Written by: P. N. Sathya
- Produced by: Ramesh Yadav
- Starring: Shiva Rajkumar; Meghna Naidu
- Cinematography: Anaji Nagaraj
- Edited by: P R Sounder Rajan
- Music by: Sadhu Kokila
- Production company: Royal Pictures
- Release date: 16 January 2003
- Country: India
- Language: Kannada

Don is a 2003 Indian Kannada-language action drama film directed by P. N. Sathya and starring Shiva Rajkumar and Meghna Naidu.

== Cast ==
- Shiva Rajkumar as Surya
- Meghna Naidu as CBI Jhansi alias Kaveri
- Avinash as Ramaswamy Iyenger
- Jai Jagadish as police officer
- Rajan P. Dev as Sadhu Shetty
- Ashok as Inspector Indrajith (cameo)
- H. G. Dattatreya
- Harish Rai
- Shobharaj
- Chitra Shenoy
- P. N. Sathya
- Bullet Prakash
- Mandeep Roy
- Ruchita Prasad (item number)

== Production ==
During the shooting of the film, a misinterpretation of the Tamil dialogues of the film crew led to them being mobbed by Bajrang Dal.

== Soundtrack ==
Soundtrack was composed by Sadhu Kokila.

- Kaveri Kandanu - Shankar Mahadevan
- Ondene Naavu Ondene - Sangeetha, Shivarajkumar
- Sundari Sundari - Nanditha, Udit Narayan
- Kannu Bitre - Manjula Gururaj
- Mehbooba Mehbooba - Shaan, Soumya

== Release ==
The film was scheduled to release on 17 January 2003, but the film ended up releasing a day earlier. Although the film was a box office success and ran for fifty days, the film was not as big a success as it was thought to become.

== Reception ==
A critic from Viggy wrote that "Don is a must see movie for Shivanna's fans". A critic from IndiaInfo wrote that "Apart from Shivaraj Kumar this film has nothing to offer". Deccan Herald wrote "Director Satya, who was successful with Majestic, has come up with a similar theme keeping in mind Shivanna’s image. The film’s music has nothing much to write home about though this is Sadhu Kokila’s 100th film. This one is a must-see for Shivanna’s fans!".
