= Sonali Joshi =

Indian actress

- Born: May 29
- Occupation: Actress
- Years active: 2001–present

Sonali Joshi is an Indian actress who has worked predominantly in Bhojpuri films alongside Telugu, Kannada and Hindi films and television. She has worked in films like Pratigya and Rangli Chunariya Tohre Naam.

== Career ==
She started her career with non-Bhojpuri films such as Subbu (Telugu) in 2001 and Xcuse Me (Hindi) in 2003. Later, she started her Bhojpuri career by working in Bhojpuri films such as Rangli Chunariya Tohre Naam (2006) and Pratigya (2008). Then, she started working in South Indian films. She did got as success as she got in Bhojpuri in South Indian film and it led to decline in her career. Later, she also worked in television serials such as Kumkum Bhagya and Yeh Rishtey Hain Pyaar Ke in 2019.

== Filmography ==
Year	Film	Role	Language	Notes
2001	Subbu	Neeraja	Telugu	
2002	Sandade Sandadi	Honey	Telugu	
2003	Xcuse Me	Saundarya Khanna	Hindi	
2004	Yours Abhi	Preeti	Telugu	
2005	Udees		Kannada	
2006	Rangli Chunariya Tohre Naam		Bhojpuri	
2007	Hoke Tu Rahbu Hamar		Bhojpuri	
2008	Pratigya	Sundari	Bhojpuri	
2009	Deewana		Bhojpuri	

=== Television ===
Year	Title	Role	Channel	Language	Notes
2019	Kumkum Bhagya	Chief Minister Vasudha	Zee TV	Hindi	
