= Subbu =

2001 film by Rudraraju Suresh Varma

- Movie poster
- Directed by: Rudraraju Suresh Varma
- Produced by: Kanakapura Srinivas; P. M. Hari Kumar
- Starring: Jr. NTR; Sonali Joshi
- Cinematography: C Vijayasri
- Edited by: Marthand K. Venkatesh
- Music by: Mani Sharma
- Release date: 21 December 2001
- Running time: 145 minutes
- Country: India
- Language: Telugu

Subbu is a 2001 Telugu-language romantic drama film directed by Rudraraju Suresh Varma and produced by Kanakapura Srinivas and P.M. Hari Kumar. It stars N. T. Rama Rao Jr., succeeding his role in the hit Student No.1, and Sonali Joshi. This film was dubbed in Hindi as Tiger: One Man Army.

== Cast ==
- N. T. Rama Rao Jr. as Bala Subramanyam
- Sonali Joshi as Neeraja
- Nutan Prasad
- Brahmanandam
- A. V. S.
- M. S. Narayana
- Dharmavarapu Subramanyam as Principal
- Banerjee as Police Inspector
- Gundu Hanumantha Rao
- Ananth
- C. V. L. Narasimha Rao as Bala Subramanyam's father
- Venu Madhav
- Krishna Reddy
- Jogi Naidu
- Swapna Reddy
- Manoja
- Manisha
- Nisha
- Krishnaveni
- Sowmya Rai
- Latha

== Soundtrack ==
The music was composed by Mani Sharma and released by Aditya Music.

Subbu

Soundtrack album by Mani Sharma
- Released: 2001
- Recorded: 2001
- Genre: Soundtrack
- Length: 26:54
- Label: Aditya Music
- Producer: Mani Sharma

Mani Sharma chronology
Bhalevadivi Basu (2001)	Subbu (2001)	Seema Simham (2002)

Track list
No.	Title	Lyrics	Singer(s)	Length
1.	"Masthu Masthu"	Kulasekhar	Ganga, R. P. Patnaik	4:31
2.	"Janani Janma Bhoomi"	Jaaladi	Mano	5:33
3.	"L.O.V.E. Pasayyanu"	Jaaladi	Sunitha Upadrashta, Mallikarjun	3:45
4.	"Vaiva Vaiva"	Suddala Ashok Teja	KK	4:11
5.	"Hari Hara"	Kulasekhar	Mano, Sunitha Upadrashta	4:57
6.	"Naa Kosame"	Sirivennela Seetharama Sastry	M. M. Keeravani, Kavita Krishnamurthy	3:57
Total length:				26:54

== Critical reception ==
Upon the release, Jeevi of Idlebrain.com gave 3/5 stating "NTR is improving from film to film. To put in a more frank way, people started accepting NTR as his number of films is increasing (remember the old adage - tinaga tinaga vemu teeyanundu)". Telugucinema.com stated "The film is below the expectations in all the senses. Songs in New Zealand are ok. Other songs are not up to the mark". Andhra Today wrote "The director makes a grand appearance on the celluloid to eulogize and compare it with several previous legends of love such as Devadas-Parvathi, and Laila-Majnu, but the movie is far from living up to them. The story is a drag and can test the patience of the audience. NTR may disappoint his audience, in this second movie. Like most bollywood starlets, Sonali Joshi may turn out to be a one-film wonder. Music by Mani Sarma is not very impressive". The movie was an average grosser at the box office.
