= Bhagavan (2009 film) =

- Directed by: Prasanth Mambully
- Written by: Prasanth Mambully
- Produced by: Vijeesh Mani
- Starring: Mohanlal; Daniel Balaji
- Cinematography: Loganathan Srinivasan
- Edited by: Manoj
- Music by: Mohan Sithara; Joji Johns; Murali Krishna; Nasaruddeen Kalipp
- Production company: Golden Valley Talkies
- Distributed by: Anaswara Cinemas Release
- Release date: 1 May 2009
- Country: India
- Language: Malayalam

Bhagavan (transl. God) is a 2009 Indian Malayalam-language medical drama film written and directed by Prasanth Mambully(in his directorial debut). Starring Mohanlal and Daniel Balaji. The story is about Dr. Balagopal who fights a terrorist group led by Saifudeen who attacks his hospital. The entire film was shot in 19 hours aiming for the Guinness World Records, but citing technical issues it did not receive the record. The film was shot simultaneously at six different locations. Seven cameras were used for filming. The film was originally planned to be shot within 12 hours, but unexpected rain delayed the shooting.

Bhagavan was released on 1 May 2009. Even though the film received mixed reviews, it recovered its cost and made some profit as it was made on a low cost and filmed in a single day.

== Plot ==
Months after the dreaded 2008 Mumbai attacks, a terrorist group led by Saifudeen planned bomb blasts at five locations in Kochi. At the same time, Zachariah Thomas, the Home Minister of Kerala, arrived at the hospital for his wife's delivery. Meanwhile, the terrorist group was planning to kidnap the Home Minister and his newborn baby. Saifudeen kidnapped three neonates and Dr. Balagopal came looking for them. Meanwhile, the Home Minister is kidnapped by Saifudeen's men. In the end, Balagopal kills Saifudeen and saves the Home Minister and the infants.

== Cast ==
- Mohanlal as Dr. Balagopal
- Daniel Balaji as Saifudeen
- Shivaji Guruvayoor as Zachariah Thomas, Home Minister of Kerala
- Lakshmi Gopalaswamy as Priya Balagopal
- Lena as Head Nurse Maria
- Ibrahim Kutty as Doctor Isaac
- Sreejith Ravi as Sadhashivan, Zachariah's PA
- Sudheesh as Attender Charlie
- Shalat
- Sreenath
- Baby Nayanthara

== Filming ==
Bhagavan was made targeting the Guinness World Records for a feature film shot in the quickest time, but did not receive the record due to technical issues. The entire film was shot in 19 hours. Filming took place on 8 December 2008 at a hospital in Guruvayur-Kunnamkulam road. The shoot was originally intended to complete in 12 hours but poor weather effected the plan. Film contains a total of 64 scenes. It was a record in the Indian film industry at that time.

== Reception ==
Paresh C Palicha from Rediff.com wrote "Mohanlal looks jaded in the film. Maybe, the pressure of finishing the work in a few hours had taken its toll. No other actor has got any prominence to be mentioned here. All in all, Bhagavan has nothing going for it except for the record breaking effort gone into making it" Sify.com wrote "particularly annoying film because the plot and presentation is amateurish and practically impossible to digest with no logic or even continuity. When you come out after watching the film, you'll feel like you've escaped from prison"
