= Prasanth Mambully =

Director, actor, and screenwriter

- Born: 23 February; Guruvayur, Thrissur, Kerala, India
- Occupations: Film director, screenwriter, actor
- Years active: 2008 – present

Prasanth Mambully is an Indian film director, screenwriter born in Guruvayur, Thrissur, Kerala, India. He initiated his career in the entertainment industry through stage shows and television programs.

== Biography ==
Mambully made his directorial debut in 2008 with the Malayalam film Bhagavan, starring renowned actor Mohanlal in lead role. The film was completed within a record breaking time span of 19 hours.

His second movie, Sugreeva (2010) marked his entry into Kannada cinema, featuring superstar Shivarajkumar in lead. Mambully surpassed his own record by completing Sugreeva with in 18 hours, earning recognition in the Limca Book of Records as the fastest film maker in the Indian film industry.

Mambully's filmography boasts seven films in major Indian languages. His new movie, "[Meta: The Dazzling Girl]", has captivated global audiences with its unique features. The movie "[Meta: The Dazzling Girl]" has received numerous accolades, including Best Experimental Film at the World Film Festival in Cannes and Best Innovative Film at the Jaipur International Film Festival.

== Filmography ==
Year	Film	Language	Notes
2009	Bhagavan	Malayalam	Debut movie as director
2010	Sugreeva	Kannada	Kannada debut
2016	Pachakallam	Malayalam	
2017	Sadrishavakyam 24:29	Malayalam	
2019	Sridevi Bungalow	Hindi	Hindi-language Debut
2024	META - The Dazzling Girl	Hindi	No dialogue single character survival film

== Awards and Accolades ==
Limca Book of Records

- National Record 2011 for fastest film maker in India.
