= Hey Nan Bheeshma Kano =

- Directed by: Surya
- Written by: Sunil Parameshwar; Ramesh Raj
- Produced by: V. Srinivas
- Starring: Devaraj; Prema; Tara; Pramod Chakravarthy
- Cinematography: R. Giri
- Edited by: K. Narasayya
- Music by: Songs: Chaitanya; Score: Ramesh Krishnan
- Production company: Sri Lakshmidurga Movie Makers
- Release date: 14 March 2003
- Country: India
- Language: Kannada

Hey Nan Bheeshma Kano (Note: Alternatively spelt as Ai Nan Bheeshma Kano.) (transl. Hey, I'm Bheeshma, dude) is a 2003 Indian Kannada-language drama film directed by Surya and produced by Pramod Chakravarthy, who costars in the film alongside Devaraj, Prema, and Tara.

== Cast ==
- Devaraj as Bheeshma (dual roles)
- Prema
- Tara as Lakshmi
- Lakshman
- Shobaraj
- Pramod Chakravarthy
- Michael Madhu
- Bank Janardhan
- Om Sai Prakash in a guest appearance

== Production ==
The film started as a low-budget film in mid-2001. However after Sripad, a computer graphic artist, showed the director Surya the looks of the Bheeshma (Devaraj) and Lakshmi (Tara) characters, Surya decided to make a high-budget production. The film was produced by Pramod Chakravarthy under his birth name Srinivas. Bheeshma in the film is not based on Bhishma from the Mahabharata but has similar characteristics and is a liquor king who fights injustice in the world around him.

Devaraj, who was in his 40s, and Tara, who was in her 30s, wore makeup to look 80 and 70-years-old, respectively. Anil, a make up artist who worked on several Tamil films such as Hey Ram (2000), and Citizen (2001) and Aalavandhan (2001), did the makeup, which took four hours to complete. All of the makeup accessories were obtained locally and from London. The make up expenses were ₹33 lakh. Depending on whether the temperature is humid, the makeup would have to be redone again within a single day. The film was scheduled to shoot for 35 days.

== Soundtrack ==
The music was composed by L. N. Shastri.

== Reception ==
A critic from Viggy.com wrote, it "Is a must see film if you want to see the maturity level of Devaraj's acting and him in action".
