= P. N. Sathya =

Indian film director, writer and actor

- Born: Karnataka, India
- Died: May 5, 2018
- Occupations: Film director, actor, producer, screenwriter
- Years active: 2002–2018
- Spouse: Roopashree S
- Children: Ruthick and Charvi

P. N. Sathya (died 5 May 2018) was an Indian film director, writer and actor working in Kannada cinema. He was known for writing and directing crime drama films. He debuted with the crime film Majestic (2002) which introduced actor Darshan in the lead role and went on to direct many such films like Don (2003), Daasa (2003), Shashtri (2005), Thangigagi (2006), Sugreeva (2010) and Shivajinagar (2014).

== Filmography ==
=== As director ===
Year	Title	Note
2002	Majestic	
2003	Don	
2003	Daasa	
2004	Saradara	
2005	Udees	
2005	Shastri	
2006	Thangigagi	
2008	Gooli	
2009	Kencha	
2009	Hatrick Hodi Maga	
2010	Sugreeva	
2011	Paagal	
2011	Jedarahalli	
2014	Shivajinagara	
2017	Bangalore Underworld	
2018	Mari Tiger	

=== As actor ===
Year	Film	Role	Notes
2002	Dhruva		
2003	Don		
2004	Saradara		
2005	Udees	Underworld rowdy	
2006	Thirupathi	Onte Krishna	
2006	Ambi		
2007	Arasu		
2008	Bidda		
2008	Chaitrada Chandrama		
2008	Akasha Gange		
2009	Chellidaru Sampigeya		
2009	Devru	Aadi	
2009	Kencha		
2009	Preethse Preethse		
2010	Chiru		
2010	Krishnan Love Story		
2011	Paagal		
2011	Chennamma IPS		
2011	Gun		
2013	Ale		
2015	Ram-Leela		
2016	One Time		
