= Vijay Urs =

Indian film playback singer (born 1980)

Vijay Urs D .Vijaya Kumar
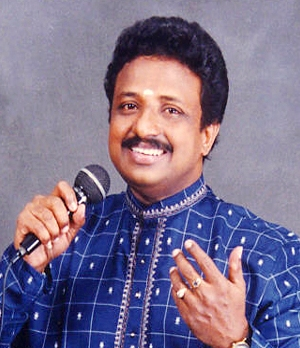

Background information
- Born: 26 April 1980 (age 46); Mysore, Karnataka
- Genres: Playback singing
- Occupations: singing, playback singing
- Years active: 1999–present

D. Vijaya Kumar (born 26 April 1980) is an Indian film playback singer. He is mostly referred to as Vijay Urs. He has won the Sarvashreshta Kalabhusana award from department of Kannada & Culture, Karnataka. His Profession is Music, passion is farming. He has recorded over 5000 songs in devotional and folk, private albums.

== Early life ==
Vijay Urs was born to Devaraj Urs and Laxmamani Urs, Mysore, Karnataka. He has one brother and two sisters. He has completed his B.Com, Diploma in Personal Management and Post graduation in Industrial Management. He has completed classical courses and is a carnatic senior.

== Personal life ==
Vijay Urs is married and has one daughter.

== Career ==
Vijay Urs has started his career by releasing an album, Bhavabindu, lyrics written by himself. He has sung over 5000 songs in Devotional and Folk in Kannada. He is known for his songs in 45 movies. He has sung for almost every music director, namely Hamsalekha, Gurukiran, Arjun Janya, Hari Krishna, Keeravani and so on. He has written more than 1000 songs which are now in market, Bhavageethe and Devotional. He is recognised as a member of IPRS (Indian Performing Rights Society). He is a recognised singer on Saavn and Gaana apps.

He has sung many songs with S. P. Balasubrahmanyam, Manu, Nandita, Shamita and many more. He has been performing orchestra since 1998 and has completed more than 3000 shows all over India, mainly in South India. He is also known for his songs in Telugu serials being Varudu Kaavali the first. He has also sung in Tamil for 3 movies and some devotional songs.

== Songs ==
Movie name	Language	Song name
Meravanige	Kannada	Student life
Meravanige	Kannada	Kaanana Kaanana
Manasugala Maatu Madhura	Kannada	Taala Tammate Dolu
Paapigala lokadalli	Kannada	Hongirana belakina hongirana
Romeo juliet	Kannada	Raani Jenu
Cheluve Ondu Heltini	Kannada	Dum dum dum dolu
Kanti	Kannada	Eedhdhelu herumba

== Gallery ==
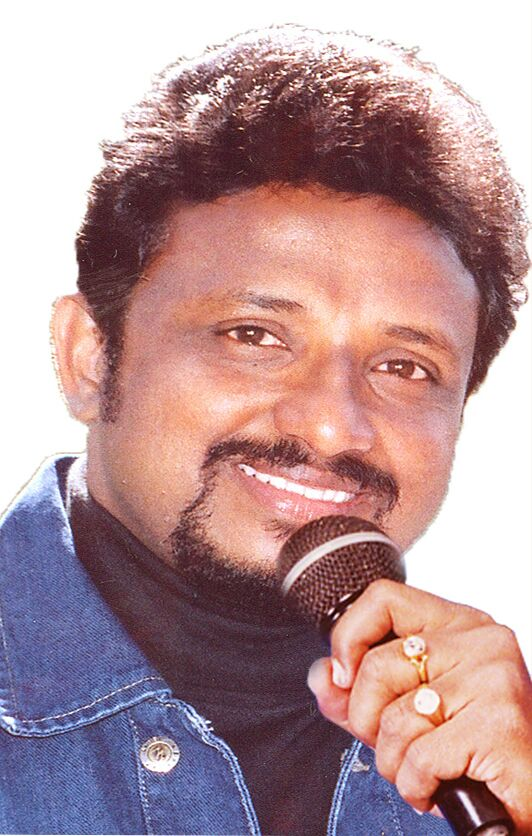
Vijay Urs

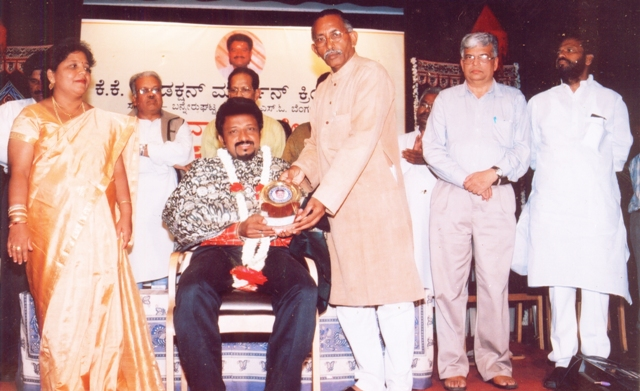
Vijay Urs

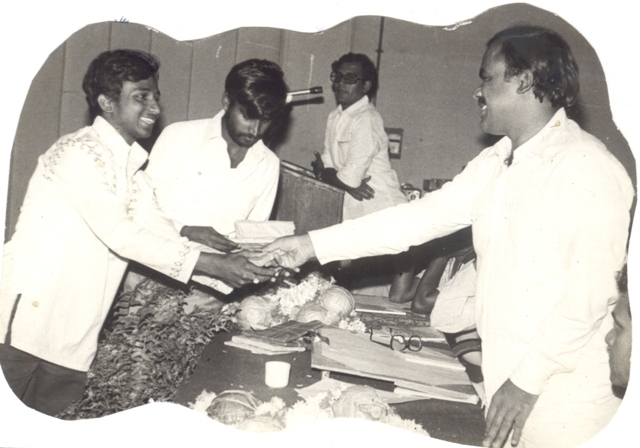
Vijay Urs at 17 Years age

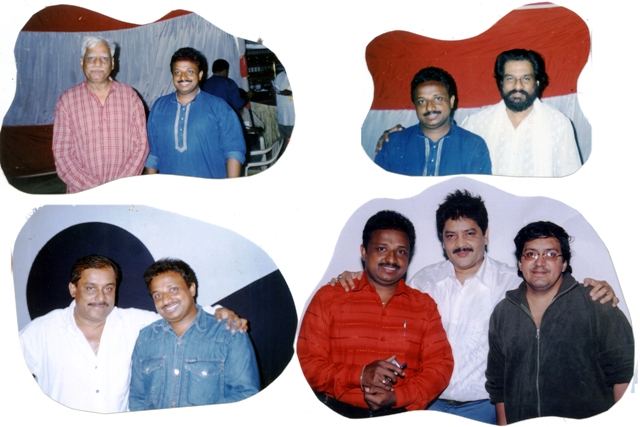
Vijay Urs

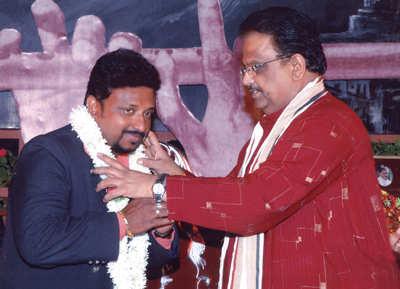
Vijay Urs

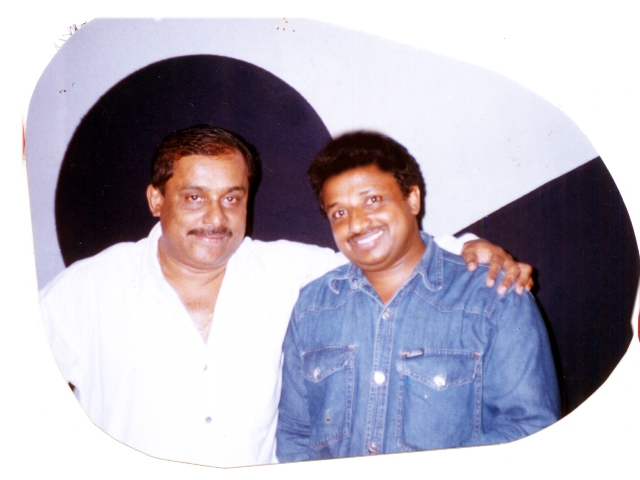
Vijay Urs with Sri Hamsalekha

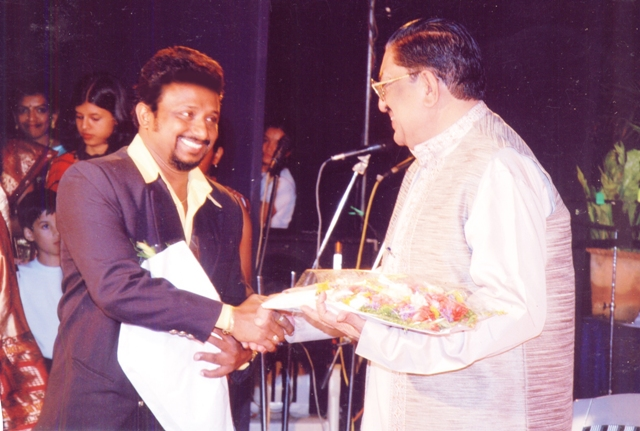
Vijay Urs with Sri.R.N.Jayagopal

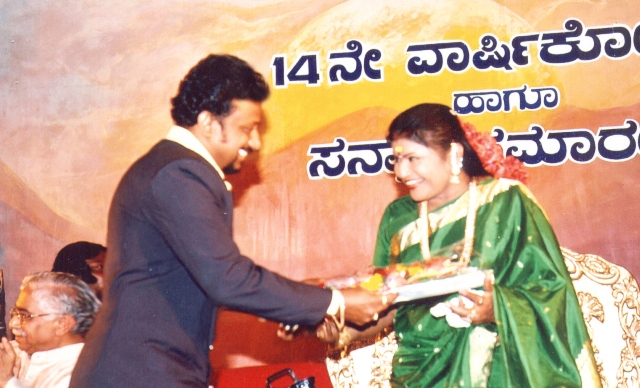
Vijay Urs with Smt.L.R.Eshwari

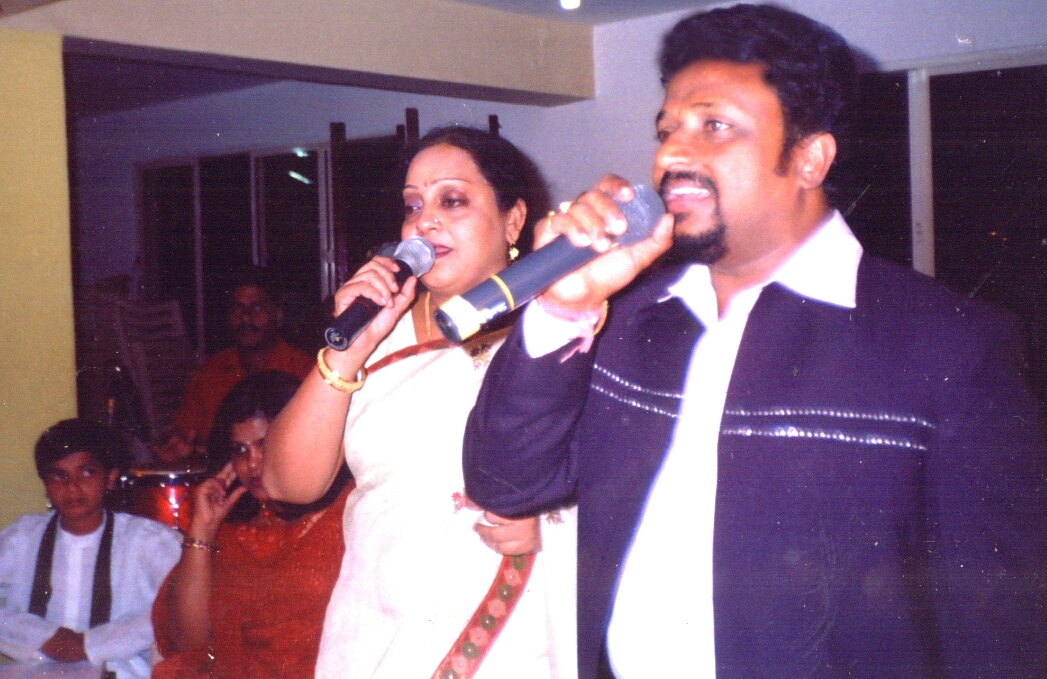
Vijay Urs singing with Smt.Manjula gururaj.

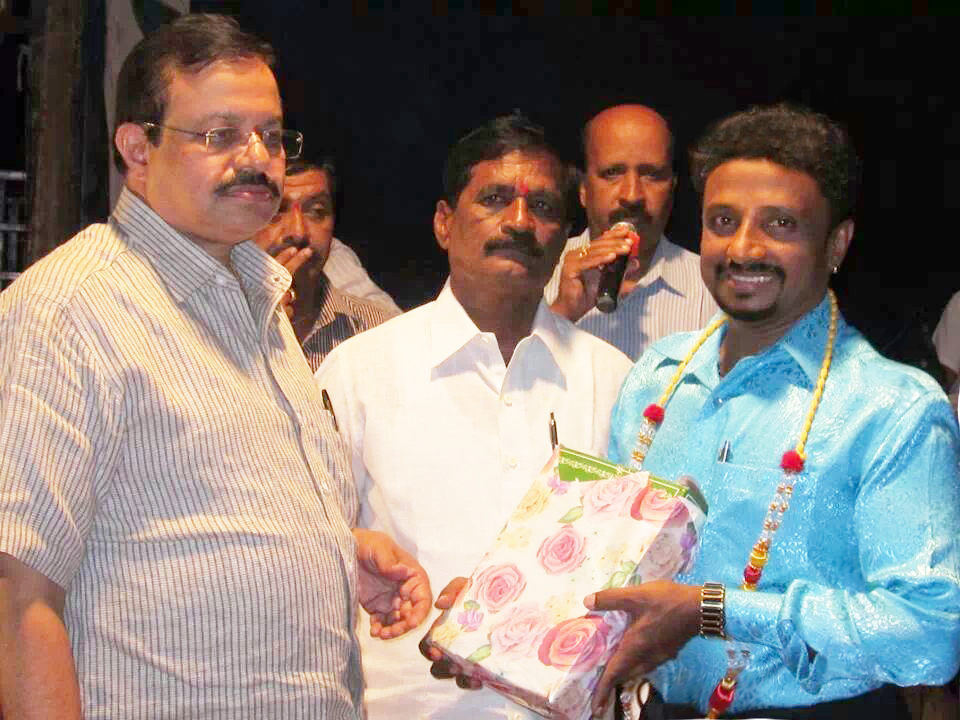
Vijay Urs

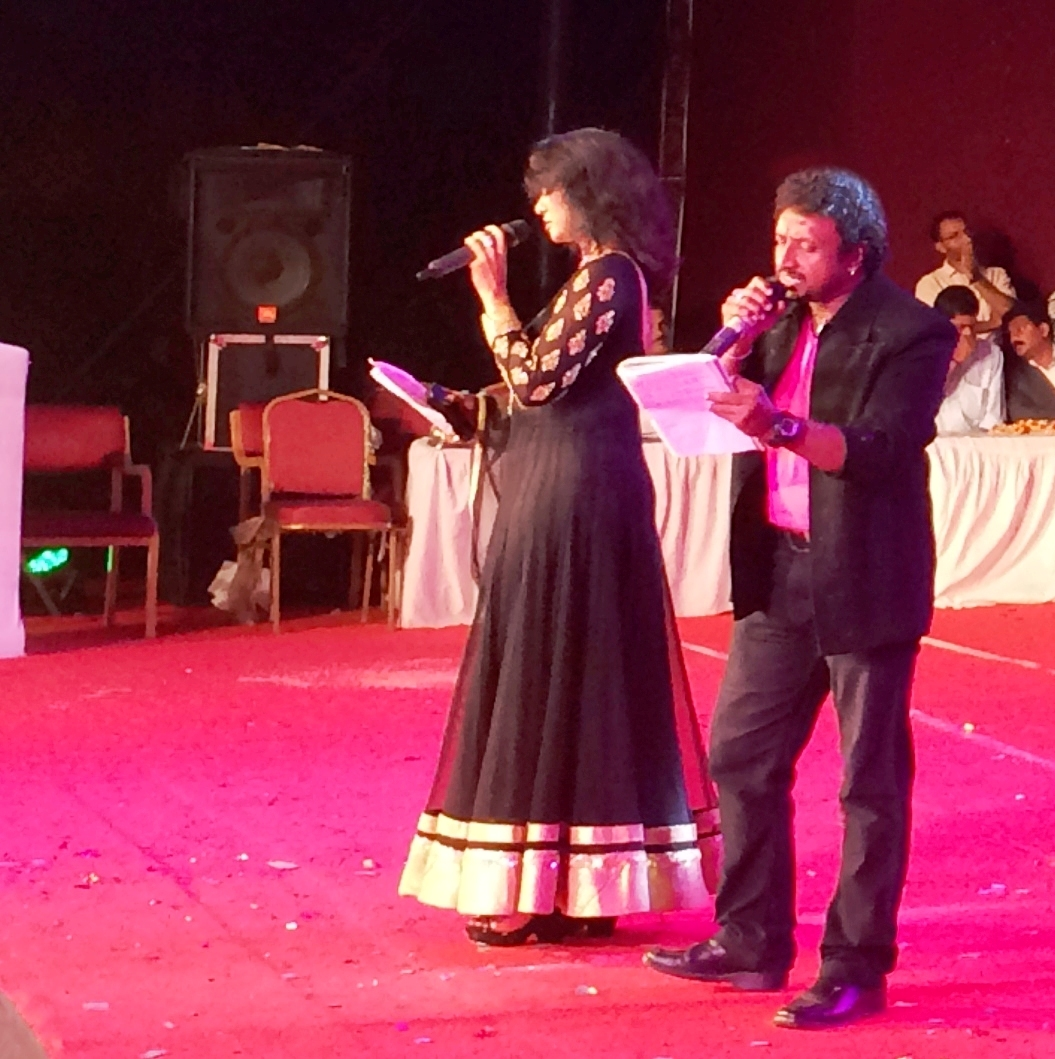
Vijay Urs

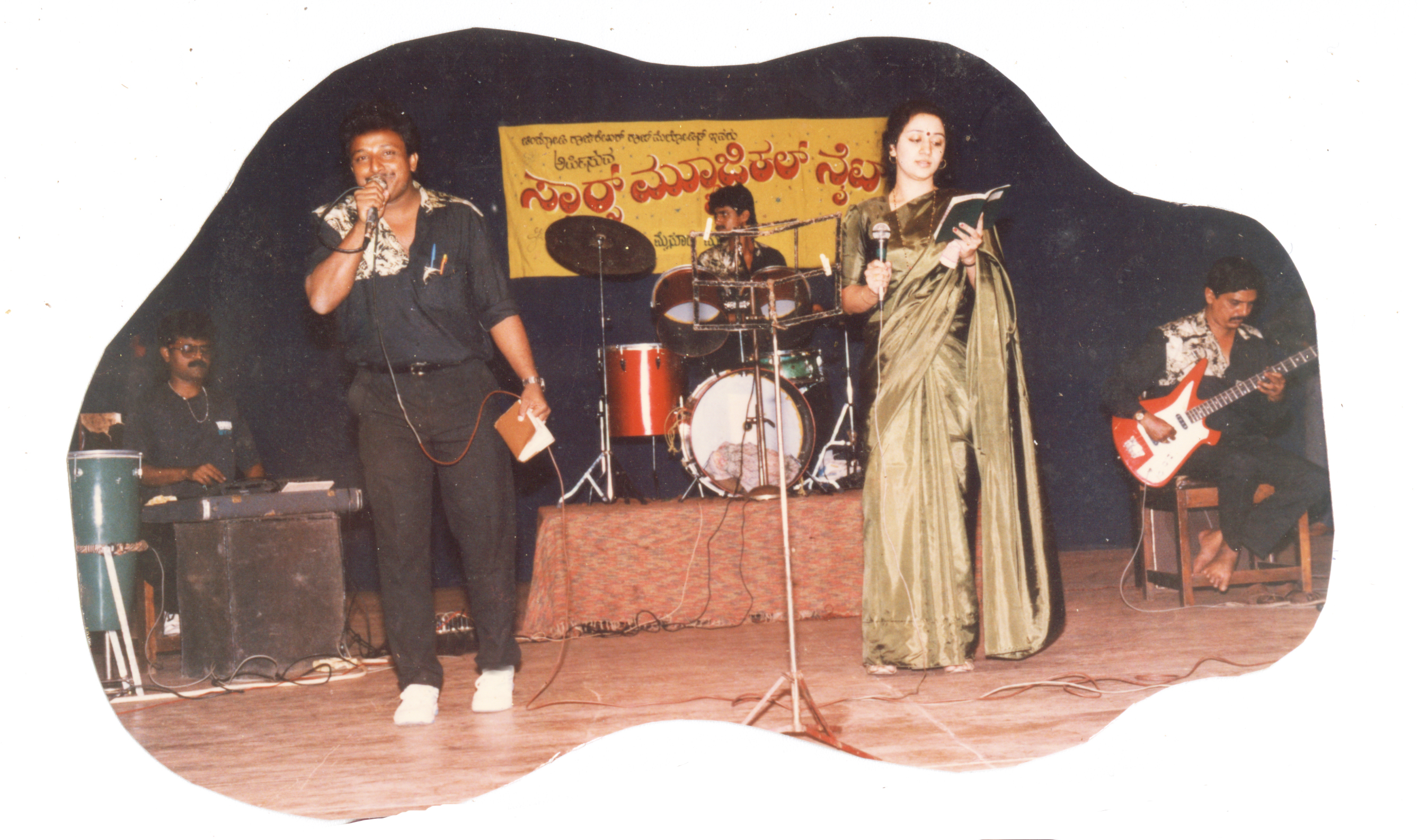
Vijay Urs

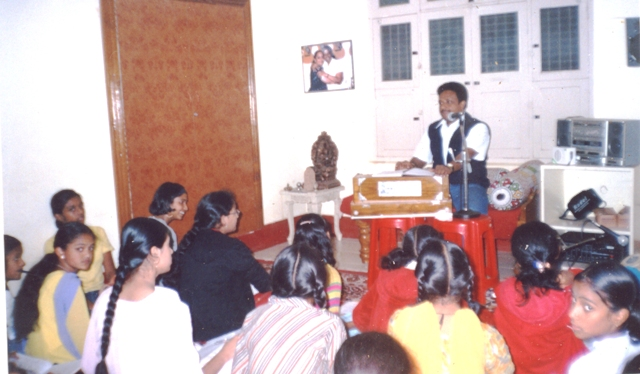
Vijay Urs

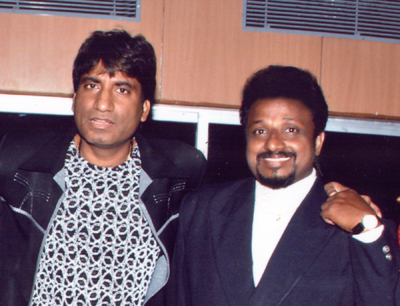
Vijay Urs

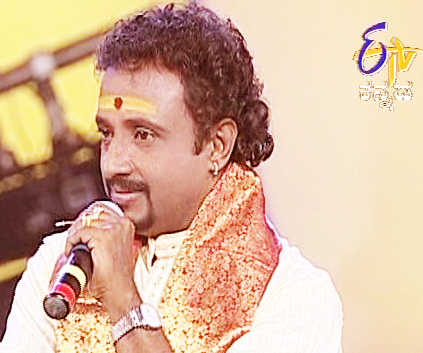
Vijay Urs in ETV Kannada programme

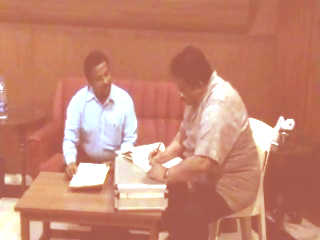
Vijay Urs in Chennai recdg

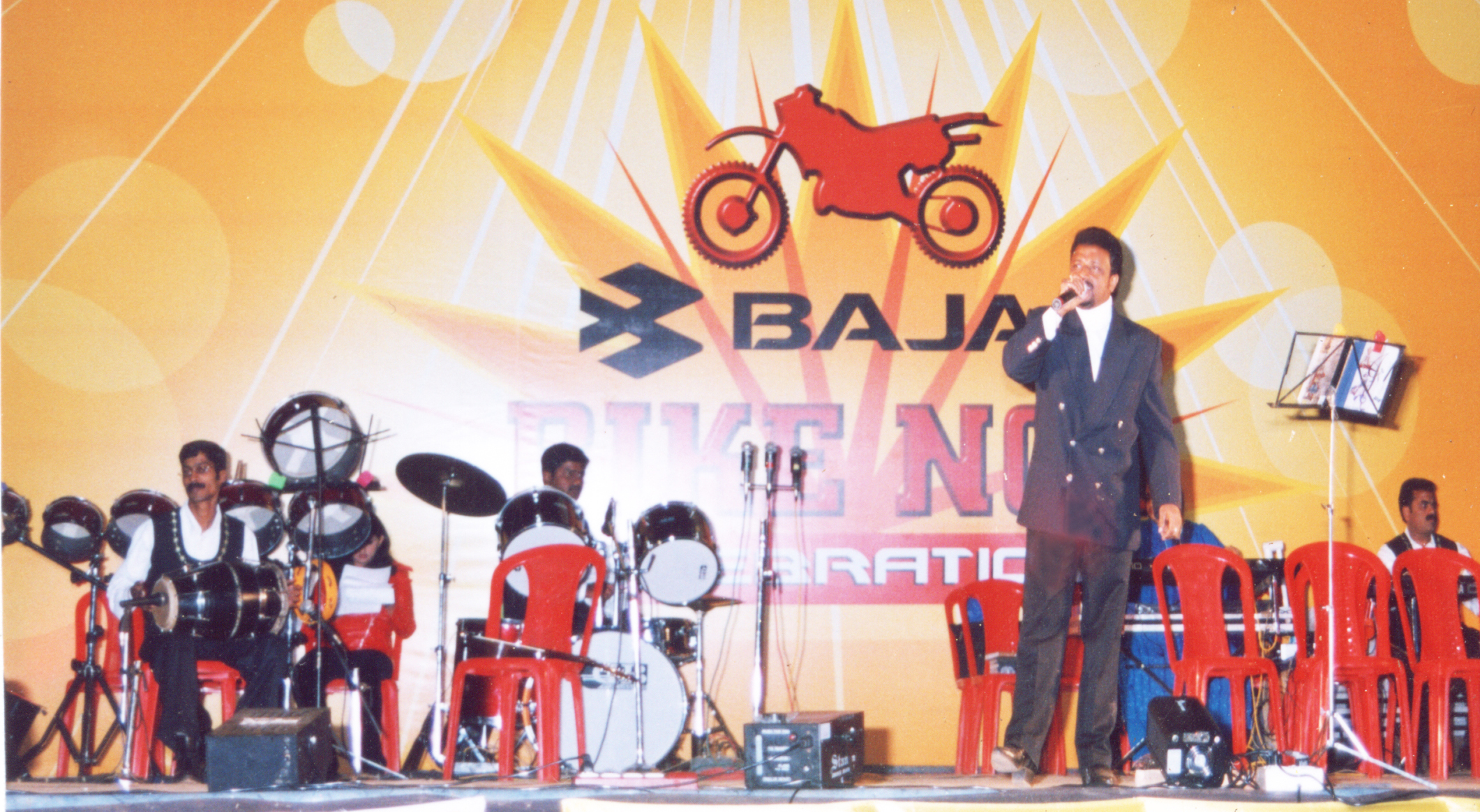
Vijay Urs in Bajaj program

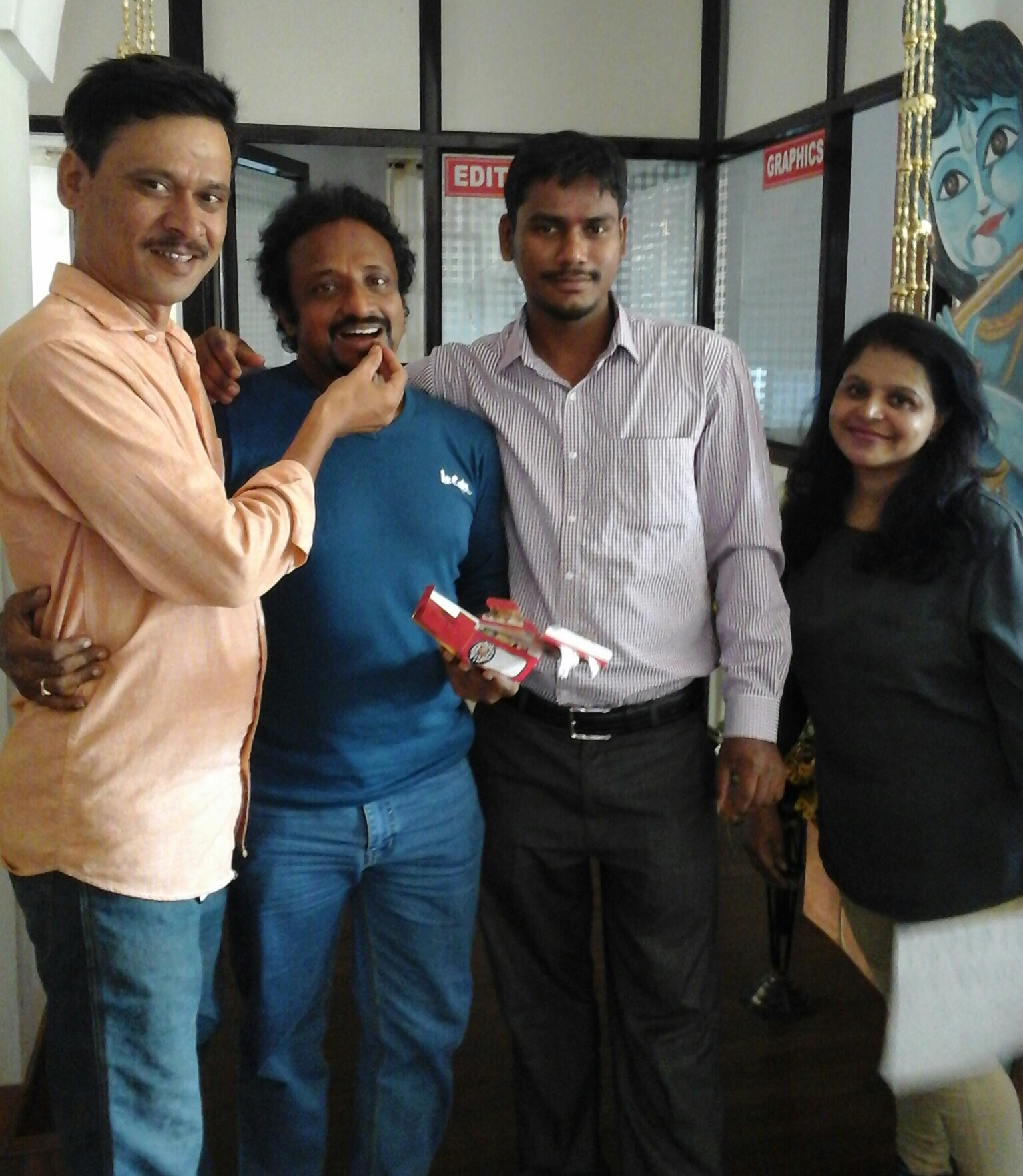
Vijay Urs

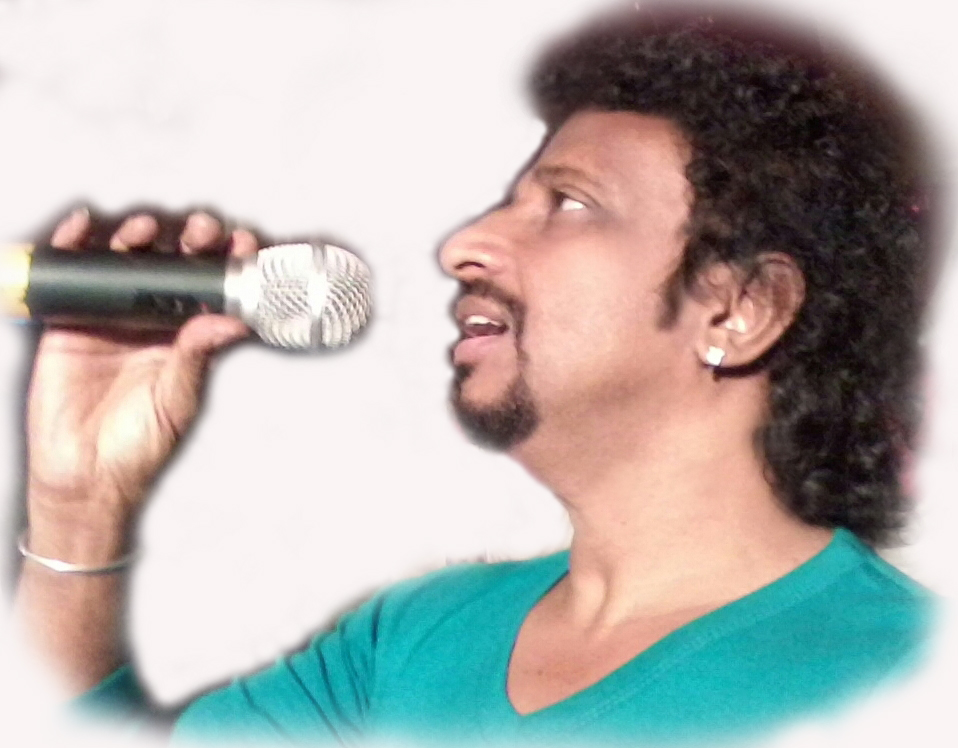
Vijay Urs

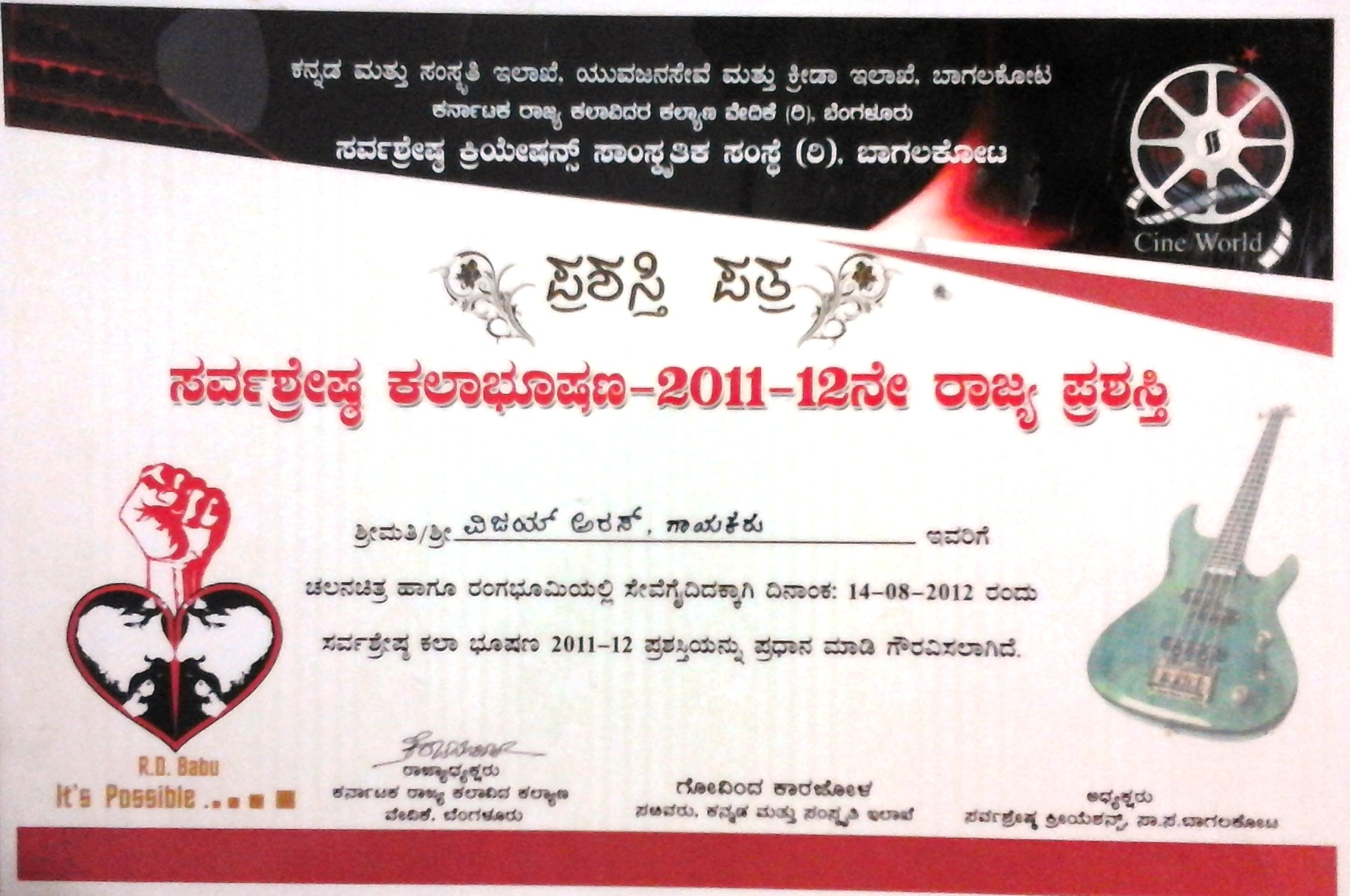
Vijay Urs

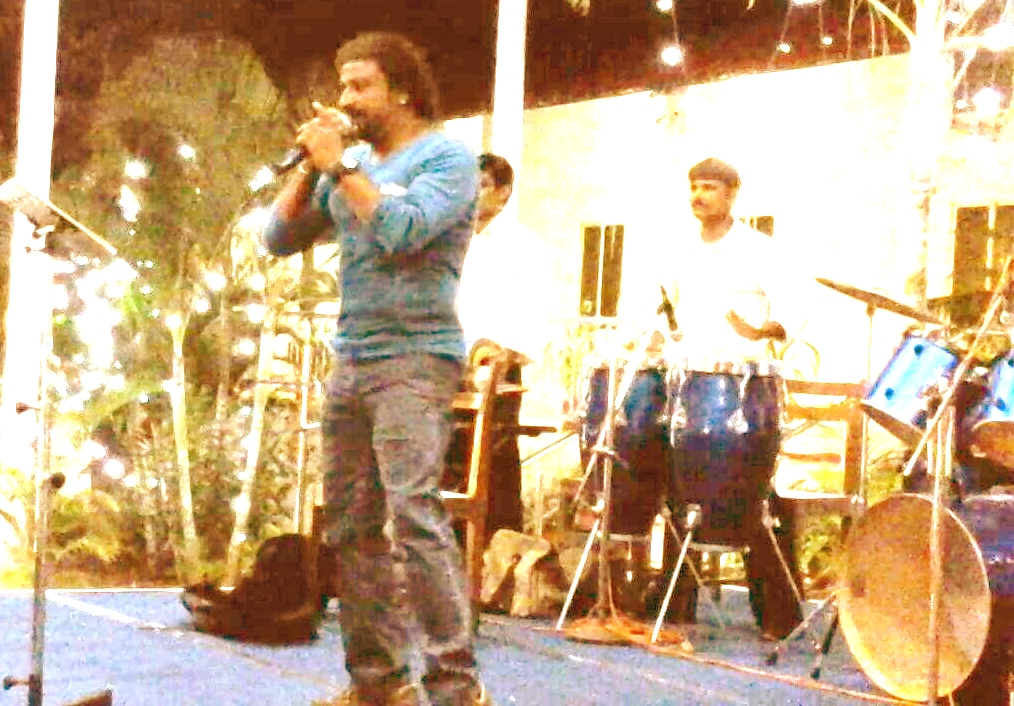
Vijay Urs

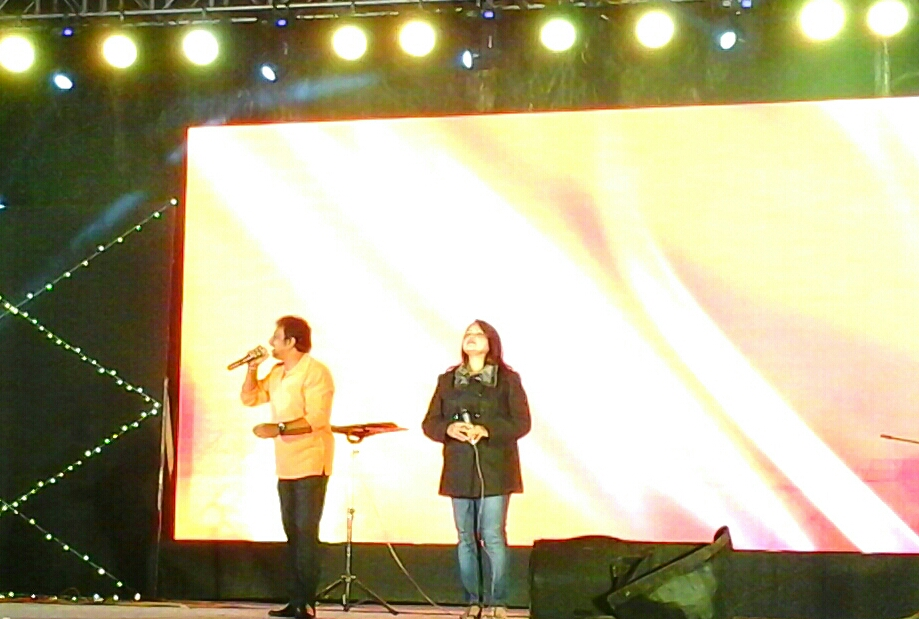
Vijay Urs

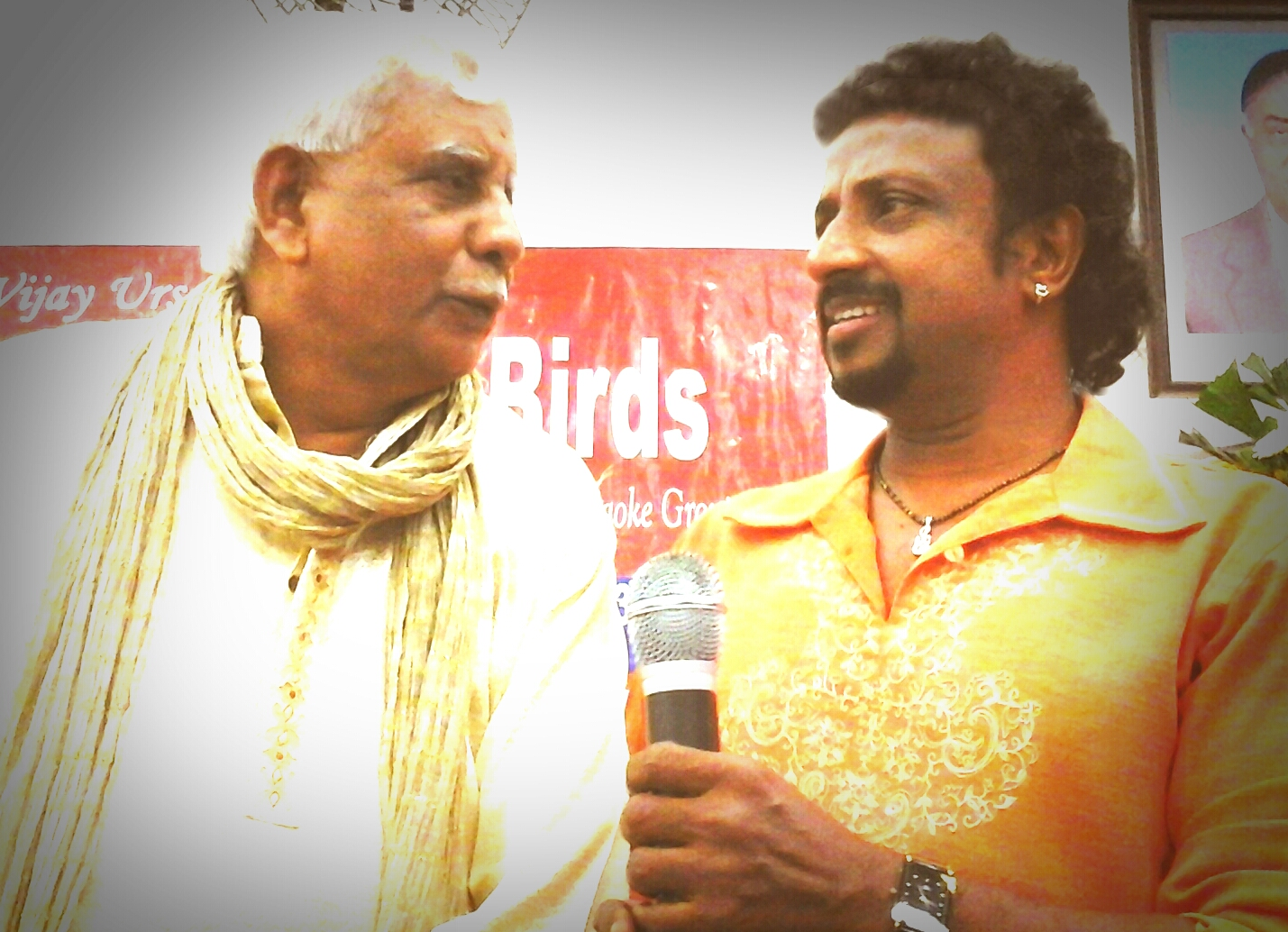
Vijay Urs

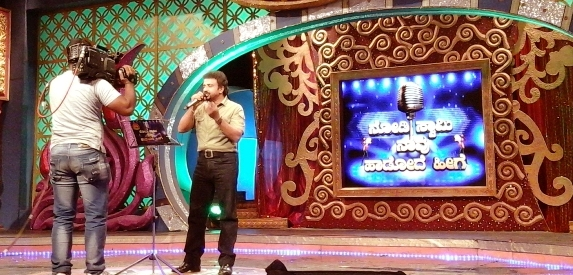
Vijay Urs

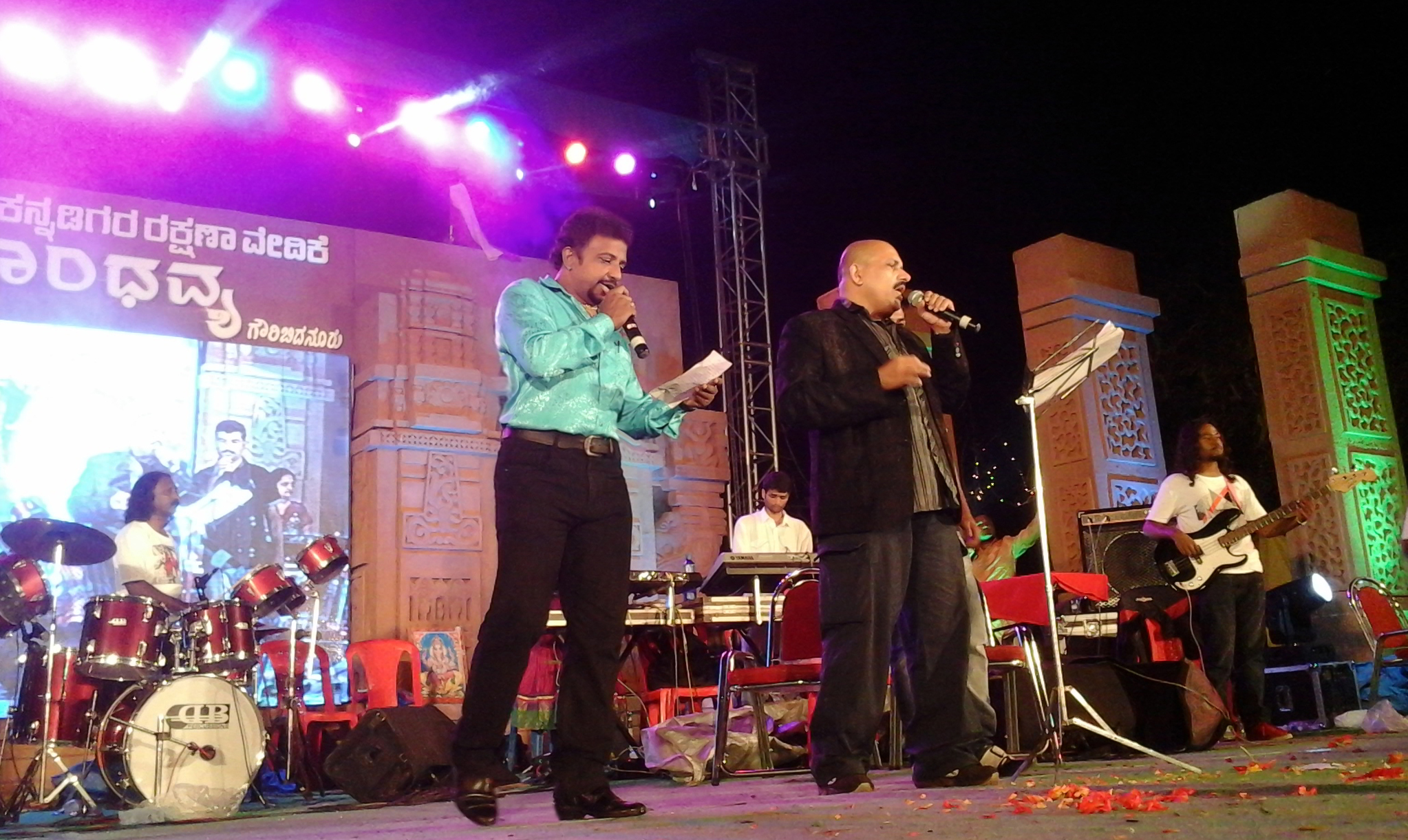
Vijay Urs

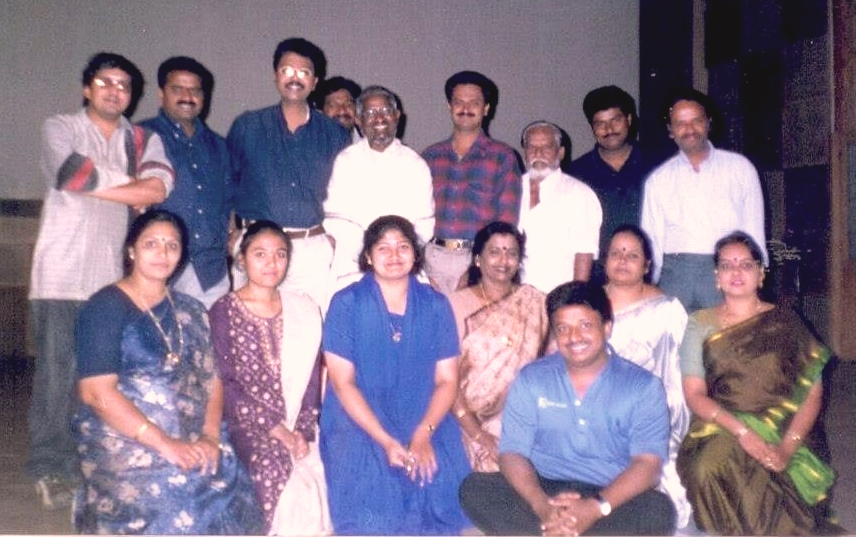
Vijay Urs

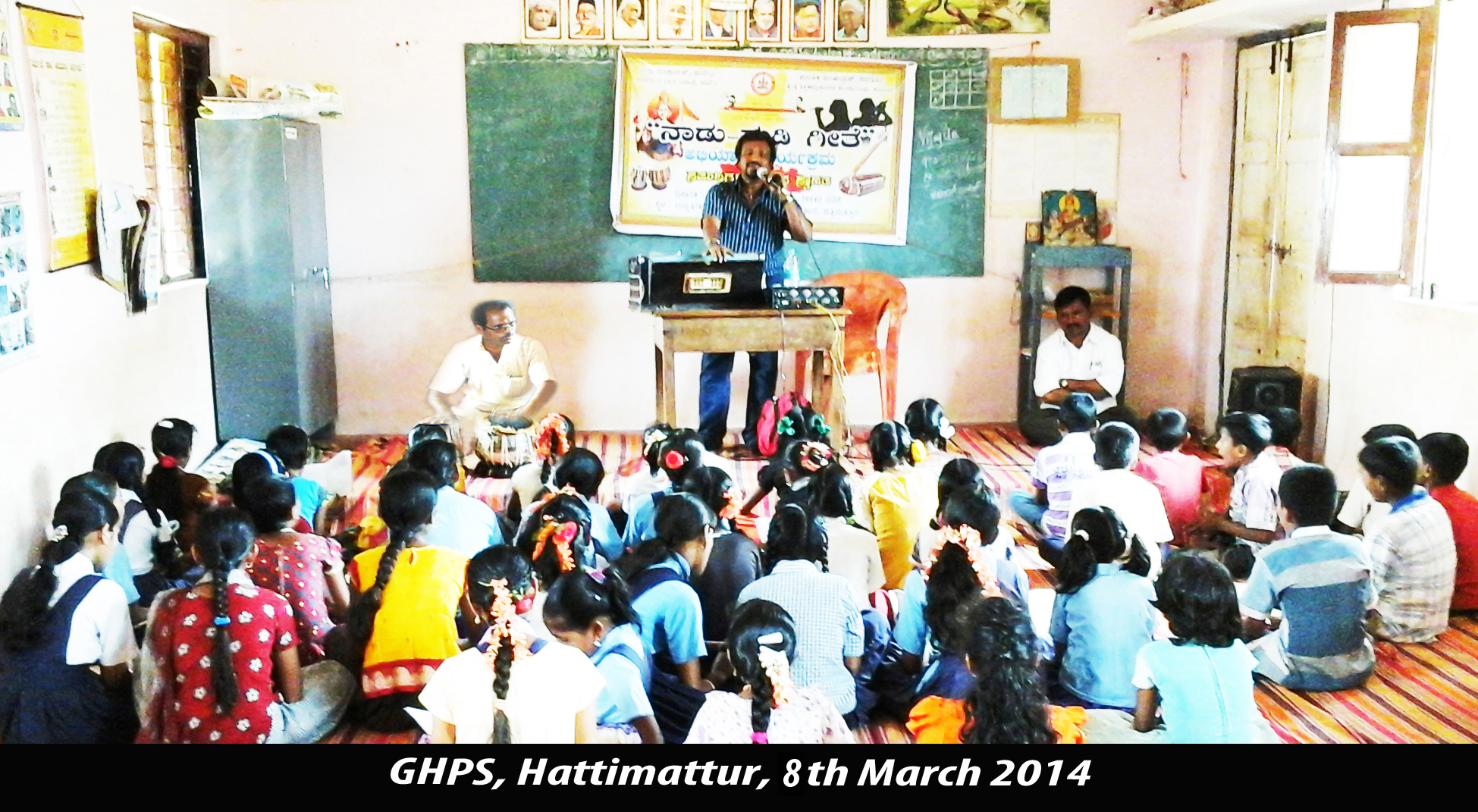
Vijay Urs

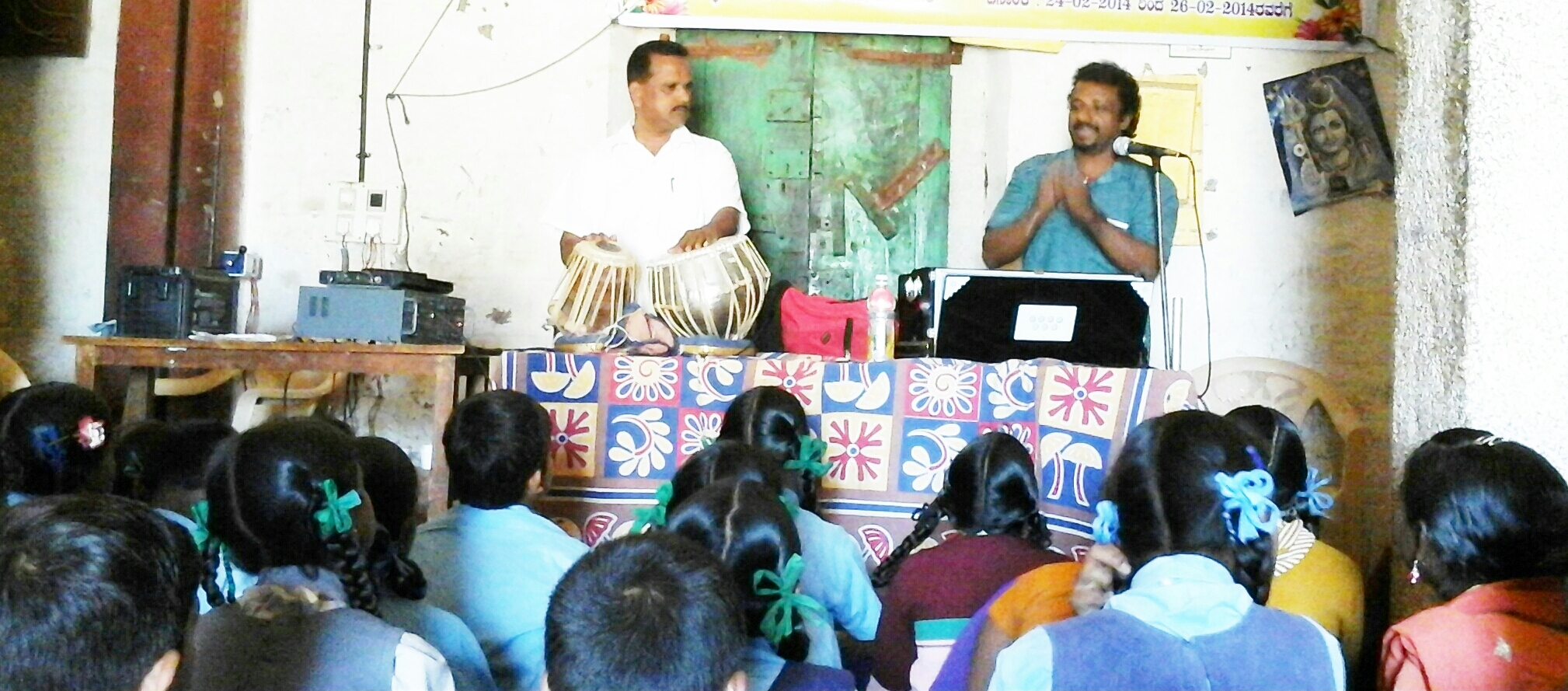
Vijay Urs

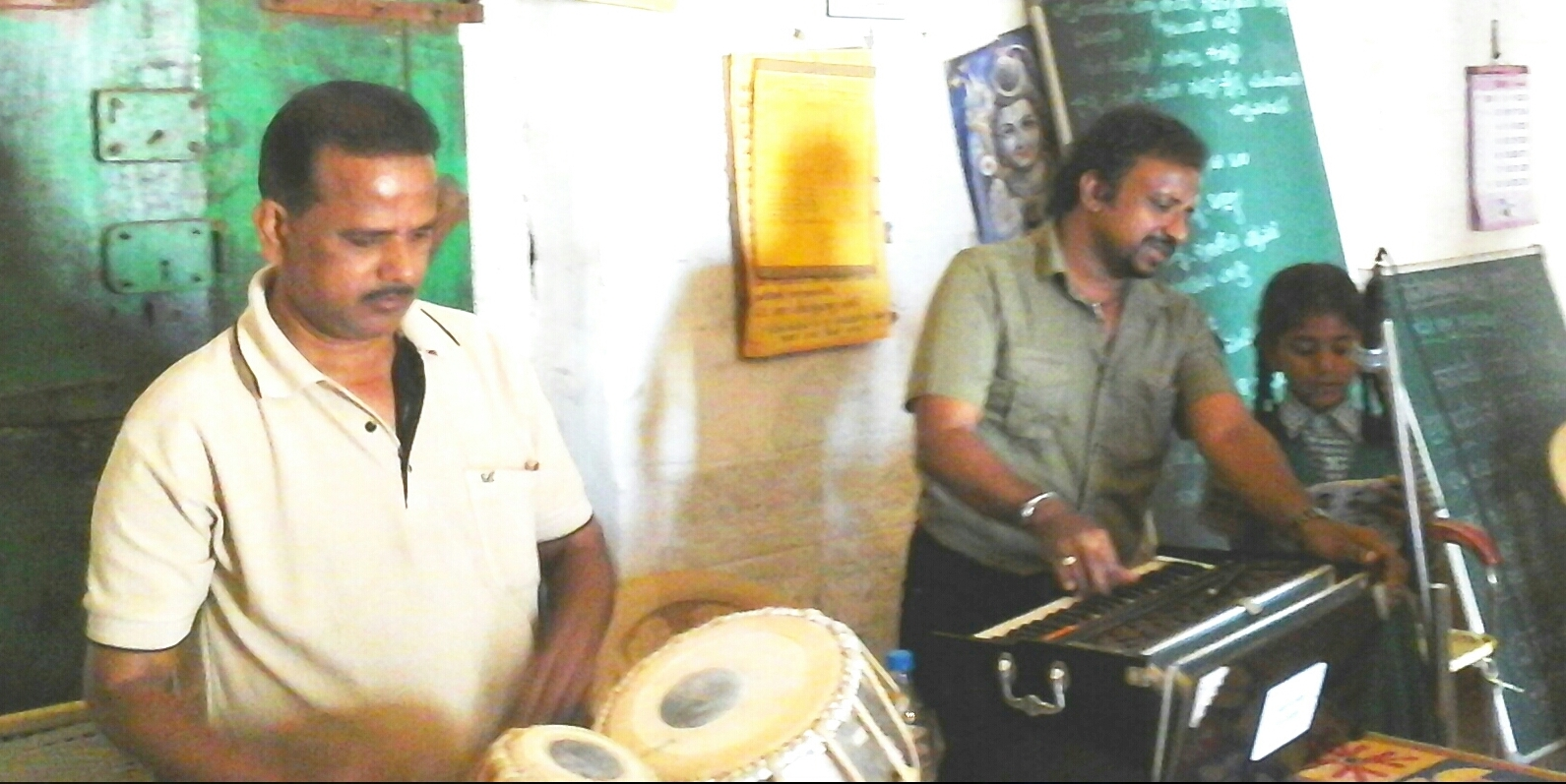
Vijay Urs

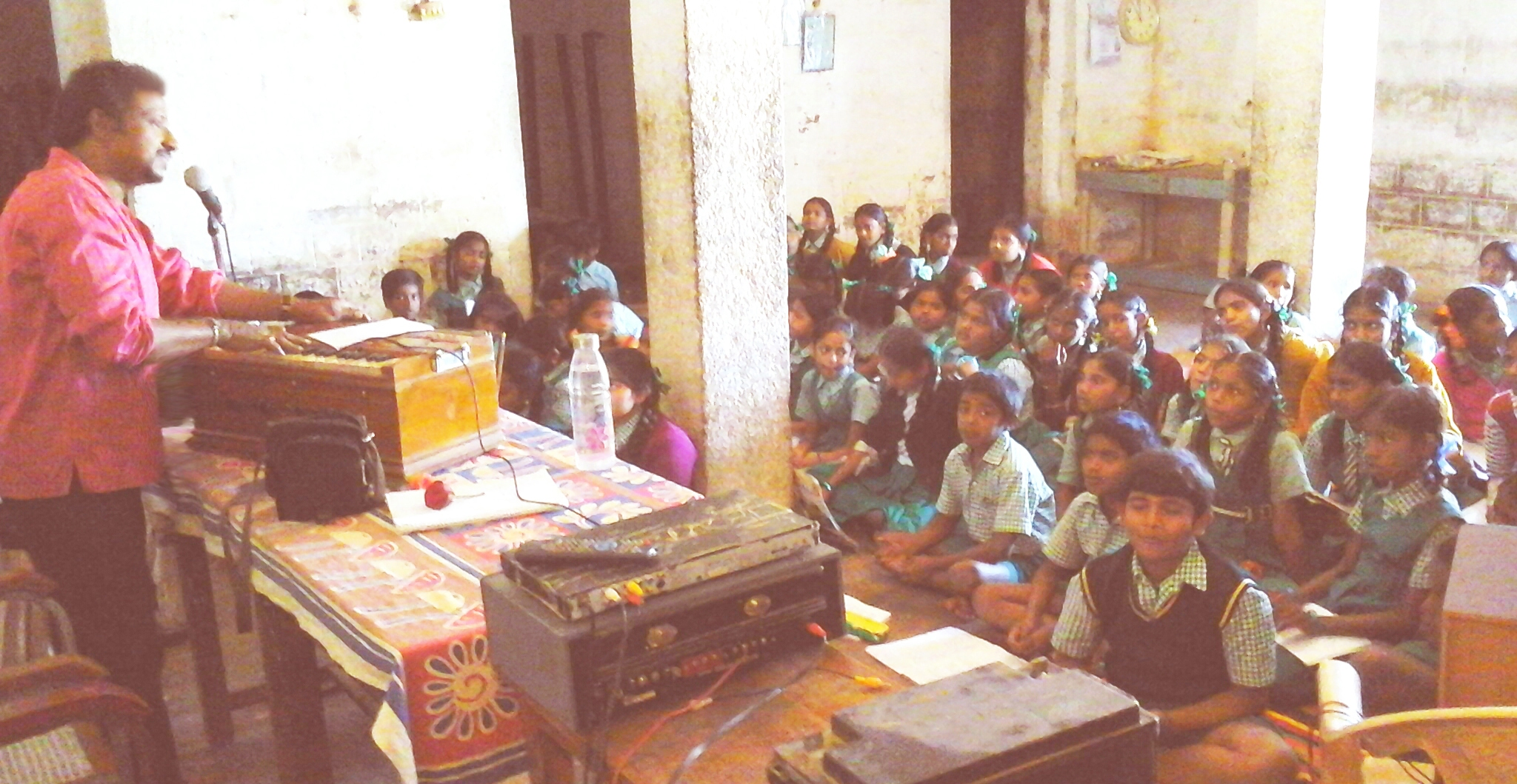
Vijay Urs

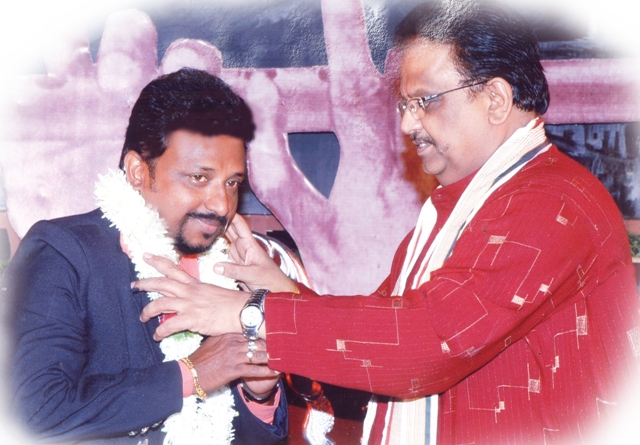
Vijay Urs with Shri.S.P. Balasubrahmaniyam
