= Sugreeva (film) =

- Theatrical release poster
- Directed by: Om Prakash Rao; P. N. Sathya; Prasanth Mambully; Nagashekar; Nagendra Magadi; Raghava Loki; R. Anantharaju; Vijay; Pramod Chakravarthy; Tushar Ranganath; A. P. Arjun
- Screenplay by: Pramod Chakravarthy
- Story by: Anaji Films
- Based on: John Q (English)(2002)
- Produced by: Anaji Nagaraj
- Starring: Shiva Rajkumar; Yagna Shetty; Dilip Raj
- Cinematography: Manohar; Niranjan Babu; Venus Murthy; Shekar Chandru; Sathya Hegde; B. Suresh Babu; M. R. Seenu; R. Giri; Sudhakar; Vishnu
- Edited by: Thirupathi Reddy
- Music by: Gurukiran
- Production company: Anaji films
- Release date: 26 February 2010
- Country: India
- Language: Kannada

Sugreeva is a 2010 Indian Kannada language film shot within 18 hours. The film was directed by 10 directors. Shiva Rajkumar acted as the protagonist. The film is a remake of the 2002 American film John Q, which had earlier been remade in Hindi in 2006 as Tathastu.

== Story ==
The story of the film revolves around a happily married mechanic hijacking a hospital to save his son who is suffering from heart disease.

== Cast ==
- Shiva Rajkumar as Sugreeva
- Yagna Shetty as Pooja
- Master Chiranjeevi as Kiran
- Harish Raj
- Dileep Raj
- Sangeeta
- Raju Talikote
- R. G. Vijayasarathy
- Harshika Poonacha
- Manjubashini
- Neenasam Ashwath
- Kote Prabhakar
- Anitha Bhat
- Achyuth Kumar

== Production ==
The movie Sugreeva started shooting at 6 a.m. on 11 October 2009 and was completed at 11:55 p.m on 11 October 2009. The crew included:

- 10 Directors
- 10 Cameraman
- 30 Assistant directors
- 40 Camera assistants
- 120 Light assistants
- 20 Art assistants
- 30 Set assistants
- 60 Production assistants
- 10 Makeup men
- 10 Costumers
- 80 stuntmen

60 artists and 600 junior artists worked day and night for the film. The film had 66 scenes in total. It was shot in eight different sets erected in and near Raj Rajeshwari Hospital at Bengalooru-Mysooru Highway.

The film failed to make it into the Guinness Book Of World Records as the quickest film ever made, because they measure the time from the beginning of shooting to the release of the movie in theatres. The current record for the quickest movie made lies with the 1999 Tamil film Suyamvaram.

== Reception ==
Shruti Indira Lakshminarayana of Rediff.com scored the film at 3 out of 5 stars and says "Shivarajkumar is good as a doting father. He gets his emotions right as both a father and a hijacker. He, however, disappoints as a dancer. Yagna Shetty is convincing as a helpless mother. Harish Raj and serial artistes Manjubashini, Dilip Raj and Ashwath Ninasam are part of the cast". A critic from Deccan Herald wrote "The film is more of actor Shivanna’s film than that of Hattrick Hero Shivarajkumar. Still, the dialogue writers can’t escape some cliches but all is forgiven in this race-to-the-finish fare". A critic from The New Indian Express wrote "This film also conveys a message to the people, especially middle-class families, on the need to save some money for the rainy day. It also highlights the importance of the ration card, especially the below poverty line (BPL) cards, to avail medical treatment at government hospitals". A critic from Bangalore Mirror wrote "Achyuth Kumar, Harish Raj and Harshika Poonacha make a mark even in their small roles. Sugreeva may not stand upto Niskarsha, the standard of hostage thrillers in Kannada, but it is a must watch for those who appreciate a well-made film".
