= List of Kannada songs recorded by Shreya Ghoshal =

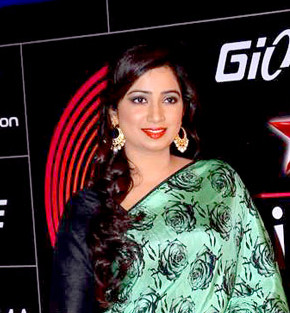
Ghoshal at 4th Global Indian Music Academy Awards, 2014

Shreya Ghoshal (born 12 March 1984) is an Indian playback singer. She sings in Hindi, Kannada, Tamil, Telugu, Malayalam, Marathi, Gujarati, Bengali, Assamese, Nepali, Oriya, Bhojpuri, Punjabi and Tulu languages. Ghoshal's career began when she won the Sa Re Ga Ma Pa contest at the age of 16. Her Bollywood playback singing career began with Sanjay Leela Bhansali's Devdas, for which she received her first National Film Award for Best Female Playback Singer along with Filmfare Award for Best Female Playback Singer and Filmfare RD Burman Award for New Music Talent. Since then, she has received many other awards. Apart from playback singing, Ghoshal has appeared as a judge on several television reality shows. She performs in musical concerts around the world. She was also honored from the U.S. state of Ohio, where the governor Ted Strickland declared 26 June 2010 as "Shreya Ghoshal Day". In April 2013, she was awarded with the highest honour in London by the selected members of House of Commons of the United Kingdom. In July 2015, John Cranley, the Mayor of the City of Cincinnati also honoured her by proclaiming 24 July 2015 as "Shreya Ghoshal Day of Entertainment and Inspiration" in Cincinnati. She was also featured five times in Forbes list of the top 100 celebrities of India. In 2017, Ghoshal became the first Indian singer to have a wax statute of her in Madame Tussauds Museum, Delhi. She also debuted as producer with her first single Dhadkane Azad Hain.

After the huge success of Devdas album Ghoshal was immediately called by various other Indian film industries for recording songs in her voice.

Ghoshal made her Sandalwood debut in 2003, singing "Krishna Nee Begane Baaro" from the film Paris Pranaya. Other notable songs she has sung in Kannada include "Araluthiru" from the film Mungaru Male, and "Aalochane" from Romeo.

Given below is the list of Kannada language songs recorded by Shreya Ghoshal. She has sung more than 320 songs in Kannada.

== Film songs ==
She sang more than 300 film songs in Kannada

=== 2003 ===
Film	No	Song	Composer(s)	Lyricist(s)	Co-artist(s)	Ref.
Paris Pranaya	1	"Krishna Nee Begane Baaro"	Stephen Prayog	Nagathihalli Chandrashekhar		
Paris Pranaya	2	"Rome Rome"	Stephen Prayog	Nagatihalli Chandrashekhar	Sonu Nigam	

=== 2004 ===
Film	No	Song	Composer(s)	Lyricist(s)	Co-artist(s)
Chappale	3	"Bachiko Nannalli"	R. P. Patnaik	Kaviraj	R. P. Patnaik
Love	4	"Love Ge"	Anu Malik	K. Kalyan	Sonu Nigam
Maurya	5	"Usiraguve Hasiraguve"	Gurukiran	K. Kalyan	Srinivas
Monalisa	6	"Manasella Neene"	Valisha–Sandeep	K. Kalyan	Rajesh Krishnan

=== 2005 ===
Film	No	Song	Composer(s)	Lyricist(s)	Co-artist(s)
Aakash	7	"Aaha Entha Aa Kshana"(Bit)	R. P. Patnaik	K. Kalyan	
Gowramma	8	"Nann Sona Sona"	S. A. Rajkumar	Upendra	Karthik
Namma Basava	9	"Serithu Mana"	Gurukiran	K. Kalyan	Sonu Nigam
News	10	"Munjaneya"(Version l)	Gurukiran	Kaviraj	Udit Narayan
News	11	"Munjaneya"(Version ll)	Gurukiran	Kaviraj	Shayal
Siddhu	12	"Surya Tampu"	R. P. Patnaik	Kaviraj	Rajesh Krishnan
Swamy	13	"Minchina Kannina"	Gurukiran	Kaviraj	Udit Narayan
Varsha	14	"Thanana Thanana"	S. A. Rajkumar	S. Narayan	Hariharan
Varsha	15	"Vasanti Vasanti"	S. A. Rajkumar	S. Narayan	Hariharan

=== 2006 ===
Film	No	Song	Composer(s)	Lyricist(s)	Co-artist(s)	Ref.
Ajay	16	"En Chanda"	Mani Sharma	Hamsalekha		
Dattha	17	"Manasa"	R. P. Patnaik	K. Kalyan	Kunal Ganjawala	
Jothe Jotheyali	18	"O Gunavantha"	V. Harikrishna	V. Nagendra Prasad	Sonu Nigam	
Madana	19	"Yarivanu"	Yuvan Shankar Raja	K. Kalyan		
Miss California	20	"First Time Heegaaytu"	Ravi Dattatreya	V. Nagendra Prasad	Ram Prasad	
Mungaru Male	21	"Araluthiru"	Mano Murthy	Jayanth Kaikini		
Mungaru Male	22	"Ivanu Geleyanalla"	Mano Murthy	Hrudaya Shiva		
Ravi Shastry	23	"Gilli Gilli"	Rajesh Ramanath	K. Ram Narayan	Kunal Ganjawala	
Sevanthi Sevanthi	24	"Bagyada Balegara"	S. A. Rajkumar	—N/a	Kunal Ganjawala	
Sevanthi Sevanthi	25	"Jaji Mallige"	S. A. Rajkumar	—N/a	Vijay Raghavendra	

=== 2007 ===
Film	No	Song	Composer(s)	Lyricist(s)	Co-artist(s)
Chanda	26	"Nee Chendaane"	S. Narayan	S. Narayan	Kumar Sanu
Chanda	27	"Yenaitho Nangenayaitho"	S. Narayan	S. Narayan	Kunal Ganjawala
Cheluvina Chittara	28	"Ullasada Hoomale"	Mano Murthy	S. Narayan	
Cheluvina Chittara	29	"Iralare Cheluve"	Mano Murthy	S. Narayan	Kunal Ganjawala
Ee Bandhana	30	"Ade Bhoomi"(Version l)	Mano Murthy	Jayanth Kaikini	Sonu Nigam
Ee Bandhana	31	"Ade Bhoomi"(Version ll)	Mano Murthy	Jayanth Kaikini	Sonu Nigam
Ee Preethi Yeke Bhoomi Melide	32	"Chandamama Kaige"	R. P. Patnaik	Prem	
Ee Preethi Yeke Bhoomi Melide	33	"Chandamama Baa"	R. P. Patnaik	Prem	
Geleya	34	"Kanasalle Mathaduve"	Mano Murthy	Jayanth Kaikini	
Hetthare Hennanne Herabeku	35	"O Henne Ninagendu"	Mano Murthy	K. Kalyan	
Hudugaata	36	"Yeno Onthara"	Jassie Gift	Jayanth Kaikini	Shaan
Kshana Kshana	37	"I Love You"	R. P. Patnaik	K. Kalyan	Rajesh Krishnan
Maathaad Maathaadu Mallige	38	"Banna Bannada"	Mano Murthy	Nagathihalli Chandrashekhar	S. P. Balasubrahmanyam
Milana	39	"Male Ninthu"(Female)	Mano Murthy	Jayanth Kaikini	
Milana	40	"Male Ninthu"(Duet)	Mano Murthy	Jayanth Kaikini	Sonu Nigam
Milana	41	"Madarangi"	Mano Murthy	Jayanth Kaikini	Rajesh Krishnan
Road Romeo	42	"Ku Kuhu Kogile"	KM Indra	KM Indra	Rajesh Krishnan
Sajni	43	"Thuru Thunthuru"	A. R. Rahman	Kaviraj	
Savi Savi Nenapu	44	"Saviyo Saviyo"	R. P. Patnaik	Nagathihalli Chandrashekhar	Sonu Nigam
Snehana Preethina	45	"Osi Osi"	V. Harikrishna	V. Nagendra Prasad	Karthik, Tippu, Anuradha Sriram
Snehana Preethina	46	"Nanna Chanchale"	V. Harikrishna	V. Nagendra Prasad	S. P. Balasubrahmanyam
Soundarya	47	"Alli Nodu Alli Nodu"	Hamsalekha	Hamsalekha	Sonu Nigam, Nandhini
Thayiya Madilu	48	"Yeke Heegaitho"	S. A. Rajkumar	S. Narayan	Shiva Rajkumar
Thayiya Madilu	49	"Nannavale Nannavale"	S. A. Rajkumar	S. Narayan	Kunal Ganjawala
Thayiya Madilu	50	"Aparanji"	S. A. Rajkumar	S. Narayan	Shankar Mahadevan
Yuga	51	"Yaavano Yaavano"	Arjun Janya	V. Nagendra Prasad	
Yuga	52	"Chanda Kane Chanda"	Arjun Janya	V. Nagendra Prasad	Kailash Kher, Srinivas

=== 2008 ===
Film	No	Song	Composer(s)	Lyricist(s)	Co-artist(s)
Arjun	53	"Balle Balle"	V. Harikrishna	V. Nagendra Prasad	Sonu Nigam
Bombaat	54	"Maathinalli"(Female)	Mano Murthy	Jayanth Kaikini	
Bombaat	55	"Chinna Hele Hegiruve"	Mano Murthy	Jayanth Kaikini	Sonu Nigam
Chaitrada Chandrama	56	"Mandaarave"	S. Narayan	S. Narayan	
Chaitrada Chandrama	57	"Nanna Cheluve"	S. Narayan	S. Narayan	Suresh Iyer
Gaja	58	"Maathu Nannolu"	V. Harikrishna	V. Nagendra Prasad	Sonu Nigam
Haage Summane	59	"Odi Bandenu"(Female)	Mano Murthy	Jayanth Kaikini	
Haage Summane	60	"Nanenu Nambodilla"	Mano Murthy	Jayanth Kaikini	Udit Narayan
Hani Hani	61	"Ninna Ee Preethige"	S Chinna	K. Kalyan	Sonu Nigam
Honganasu	62	"Chigurodeda"	Hamsalekha	Hamsalekha	
Honganasu	63	"Kandukonde"	Hamsalekha	Hamsalekha	Hemanth Kumar
Madesha	64	"Lahari"(Female)	Mano Murthy	Jayanth Kaikini	
Mandakini	65	"Bellakki Bellakki"	K. Kalyan	K. Kalyan	
Mandakini	66	"Ondu Beladingalali"	K. Kalyan	K. Kalyan	Abjith Sawanth
Moggina Manasu	67	"Male Baruvahaagide"	Mano Murthy	Jayanth Kaikini	
Moggina Manasu	68	"Moggina Manasali"	Mano Murthy	Shashank	
Mussanjemaatu	69	"Akasha Bhoomi"	V. Sridhar	V. Sridhar	
Mussanjemaatu	70	"Ninna Nodalentho"	V. Sridhar	Ram Narayan	Sonu Nigam
Premigagi Naa	71	"Dilnal Love Bandre"	Rajesh Ramanath	Snehapriya	Udit Narayan
Taj Mahal	72	"Neenendu Nannavanu'	Abhimann Roy	R. Chandru	
Vamshi	73	"Jothe Jotheyali"	R. P. Patnaik	Ram Narayan	Puneeth Rajkumar
Yuga Yugagale Sagali	74	"Hai Bhoomi"	Hamsalekha	Hamsalekha	
Yuga Yugagale Sagali	75	"Namma Naadu"	Hamsalekha	Hamsalekha	Kunal Ganjawala

=== 2009 ===
Film	No	Song	Composer(s)	Lyricist(s)	Co-artist(s)
Ambari	76	"Nee Sokalu"	V. Harikrishna	A P Arjum	
Bhagyada Balegara	77	"Nannane Noduvanu"	Ilaiyaraaja	Kaviraj	Ilaiyaraaja
Bhagyada Balegara	78	"Balegara Balegara"	Ilaiyaraaja	V. Nagendra Prasad	Kunal Ganjawala
Bhagyada Balegara	79	"Chendulli Chendulli"	Ilaiyaraaja	V. Nagendra Prasad	Ilaiyaraaja
Birugaali	80	"Hoovina Baanadante"	Arjun Janya	Jayanth Kaikini	
Chamkaisi Chindi Udiaisi	81	"Bhejanagi Premisu"	PB Balaji		Tippu
Chellidaru Sampigeya	82	"Gelathi"	S. Narayan	S. Narayan	Kunal Ganjawala
Cheluvina Chilipi	83	"Sai Sai Chakora"	Mickey J. Meyer	S Narayan	Chetan Sosca
Cheluvina Chilipi	84	"Yaavudu Enadu"	Mickey J. Meyer	S Narayan	
Devru	85	"Doora Swalpa Doora"(Female)	Sadhu Kokila	Yogaraj Bhat	
Gilli	86	"Nenedu Nenedu Nodu"(Female)	Yuvan Shankar Raja	Ram Narayan	
Gokula	87	"Aaramagi Idde Naanu"	Mano Murthy	Jayanth Kaikini	Sonu Nigam
Gokula	88	"Aaramagi Idde Naanu"(Remix)	Mano Murthy	Jayanth Kaikini	Sonu Nigam
Jaaji Mallige	89	"Olave"	Sadhu Kokila	K Ram Narayan	Karthik
Jaaji Mallige	90	"Cheluve Brahmana"	Sadhu Kokila	K Ram Narayan	Karthik
Kabaddi	91	"Preethi Maadiro"	Hamsalekha		Kunal Ganjawala
Machchaa	92	"Neeli Neeli Aakashadali"	Arjun Janya	Jayanth Kaikini	Shaan
Male Barali Manju Irali	93	"Ondu Ninna"	Mano Murthy	Jayanth Kaikini	
Male Barali Manju Irali	94	"Gelathi Neenu Iruvaga"	Mano Murthy	Jayanth Kaikini	Sonu Nigam
Maleyali Jotheyali	95	"Shuruvaagidhe"	V. Harikrishna	Kaviraj	Shaan
Maleyali Jotheyali	96	"Yenu Helabeku	V. Harikrishna	Jayanth Kaikini	Sonu Nigam
Manasaare	97	"Kanna Haniyondige"	Mano Murthy	Yogaraj Bhat	KK
Manasaare	98	"Naa Naguva Modalene"	Mano Murthy	Yogaraj Bhat	
Muniya	99	"O Chandamama"	Abhimann Roy		Rajesh Krishnan
Olave Jeevana Lekkachaara	100	"Nanna Preethiya Geleya"	Mano Murthy	Jayanth Kaikini	Rajesh Krishnan
Parichaya	101	"Kudinotave Manamohaka"	Jassie Gift	Jayanth Kaikini	Shaan
Prem Kahani	102	"Rangu Rangu"	Ilaiyaraaja	Pilla Zamindar	Ilaiyaraaja
Prem Kahani	103	"Shrungaara Bangaara"	Ilaiyaraaja	Kaviraj	
Raaj- The Showman	104	"Poli Ivanu"	V. Harikrishna	Prem	
Raaj- The Showman	105	"Kuch Kuch Antide"	V. Harikrishna	Prem	Krishna Beura
Raaj- The Showman	106	"Raajaa Heluvagella"	V. Harikrishna	Prem	Prem
Shivamani	107	"Moda Modalu"	Veer Samarth		Karthik

=== 2010 ===
Film	No	Song	Composer(s)	Lyricist(s)	Co-artist(s)
Bindas Hudugi	108	"Kannalli Kannittu Nodu"	Erra Ramesh		
Chirru	109	"Ille Ille Ello"	Giridhar Diwan	Ghouse Peer	Sonu Nigam
Crazy Kutumba	110	"Amma Naanu"	Ricky Kej	H. S. Venkateshamurthy	
Eno Onthara	111	"Inthi Ninna Preethiya"	V. Harikrishna	Jayanth Kaikini	Sonu Nigam
Jackie	112	"Eradu Jadeyannu"	V. Harikrishna	Yogaraj Bhat	Sonu Nigam
Jothegara	113	"Jotheyalli Nee Baaro"	Sujeeth Shetty	Jayanth Kaikini	Shaan
Jothegara	114	"Yaake Yaake"	Sujeeth Shetty	Jhamkandi Shivu	
Jothegara	115	"Ondondu Ondondu"	Sujeeth Shetty	Jayanth Kaikini	Kunal Ganjawala
Just Maath Maathalli	116	"Hello Jhinugiruva"	Raghu Dixit		
Mathe Mungaru	117	"Chita Pata Pata"	X Paulraj	Dhwarki Raghava	Karthik
Naanu Nanna Kanasu	118	"Balukthalamma"	Hamsalekha	Hamsalekha	
Nanjangud Nanjunda	119	"Mella Mella Ee Preeti"	K V Ravichandran	V Nagendra Prasad	Sonu Nigam
Nooru Janmaku	120	"Gellu Baa Gellu Baa"	Mano Murthy	Nagathihalli Chandrashekhar	
Pancharangi	121	"Hudugaru Beku"	Mano Murthy	Yogaraj Bhat	
Pancharangi	122	"Ninnaya"	Mano Murthy	Jayanth Kaikini	
Preethi Nee Shashwathana	123	"Obba Hudugana Manassu"	K. Kalyan		Sonu Nigam
Preethi Nee Shashwathana	124	"Yaavudo Preethiya Kogile"	K. Kalyan		
Premism	125	"Premism Premism"	Hamsalekha		
Sanchari	126	"Gaaliye"	Arjun Janya	Jayath Kaikini	Sonu Nigam
Sanchari	127	"Kanna Saneyalli"	Arjun Janya	V Nagendra Prasad	
Suryakaanti	128	"Chan Channare"	Ilaiyaraaja	Jayanth Kaikini	
Suryakaanti	129	"Edeya Baagilu"	Ilaiyaraaja	Jayanth Kaikini	Kunal Ganjawala
Veera Parampare	130	"Tangaaliyalli Teli Hode"	S. Narayan	S. Narayan	Karthik

=== 2011 ===
Film	No	Song	Composer(s)	Lyricist(s)	Co-artist(s)
Aata	131	"Hey Yavva"	Sadhu Kokila	Revanna	Kunal Ganjawala
Aata	132	"Ninninda"	Sadhu Kokila	Jayanth Kaikini	Sonu Nigam
Aata	133	"Onde Samane"(Duet)	Sadhu Kokila	Jayanth Kaikini	Sonu Nigam
Aata	134	"Onde Samane"(Female)	Sadhu Kokila	Jayanth Kaikini	
Hori	135	"Geleya"	Renukumar	K Ramnarayan	Kunal Ganjawala
Jogayya	136	"Kuri Kolinaa"	V. Harikrishna	Prem	Kailash Kher, Vijay Prakash
Jogayya	137	"Jogayya Baa"	V. Harikrishna	Prem	
Jogayya	138	"Yaru Kaanadooru"	V. Harikrishna	Prem	Sonu Nigam
Jogayya	139	"Odole"	V. Harikrishna	Prem	Prem
Karthik	140	"Nee Thandiruve Neenu"	John V	Hrudaya Shiva	Shaan
Kempe Gowda	141	"Tara Tara"	Arjun Janya	Ghouse Peer	Vijay Prakash
Krishnan Marriage Story	142	"Ee Janmavu"	Sridhar V Sambhram	Shawshank Sheshagiri	Sonu Nigam
Lifeu Ishtene	143	"Maayavi Maayavi"	Mano Murthy	Yogaraj Bhat	Sonu Nigam
Mr. Duplicate	144	"Ninnanne Nodutha"	Mano Murthy	Jayanth Kaikini	Sonu Nigam
Olave Mandhara	145	"Kaaya Vacha Manasa"	Deva	Jayatheertha	L. N. Shastry
Olave Mandhara	146	"Chinna Ninna Bali Seralu"	Deva	K. Kalyan, Jayatheertha	Rajesh Krishnan
Paramathma	147	"Thanmayaladenu"	V. Harikrishna	Jayanth Kaikini	
Rajadhani	148	"Midiva Ninna"	Arjun Janya	Jayanth Kaikini	Sonu Nigam
Sanju Weds Geetha	149	"Sanju Mathu Geetha"(Duet)	Jassie Gift	Kaviraj	Sonu Nigam
Sanju Weds Geetha	150	"Gaganave Baagi"	Jassie Gift	Kaviraj	Sonu Nigam
Sanju Weds Geetha	151	"Omme Baaro"	Jassie Gift	Kaviraj	
Sanju Weds Geetha	152	"Sanju Mathu Geetha"(Female)	Jassie Gift	Kaviraj	
Shyloo	153	"Oh Jeevave"(Duet)	Jassie Gift	Kaviraj	Shaan
Shyloo	154	"Oh Jeevave"(Female)	Jassie Gift	Kaviraj	
Swayam Krushi	155	"Yaru Yaru Jadhugara"	Abhimann Roy		
Sihi Muthu	156	"Mayavi Yaaro"	V. Harikrishna	Jayanth Kaikini	
Uyyale	157	"Chinna Ni Nanna"	Ricky Kej		Kunal Ganjawala

=== 2012 ===
Film	No	Song	Composer(s)	Lyricist(s)	Co-artist(s)	Ref.
AK 56	158	"Karedaaga"	Abhimann Roy	Jayanth Kaikini	Sonu Nigam, Rajesh	
Alemari	159	"Neeli Neeli"	Arjun Janya	Santhu	Javed Ali	
Alemari	160	"Neeli Neeli"(Pathos)	Arjun Janya	Santhu	Javed Ali	
Anna Bond	161	"Enendu Hesaridalli"	V. Harikrishna	Jayanth Kaikini	Sonu Nigam	
Chingari	162	"Gamanava"	V. Harikrishna	Jayanth Kaikini	Javed Ali	
Kiladi Kitty	163	"Madhura Huchhu"(Duet)	Jassie Gift	Yogaraj Bhat	Tippu	
Kiladi Kitty	164	"Madhura Huchhu"(Female)	Jassie Gift	Yogaraj Bhat		
Ko Ko	165	"Aakasmika Geleyanu"	Ramana Gogula	Kaviraj	Kunal Ganjawala	
Lucky	166	"Hoovina Santhege"	Arjun Janya	Jayanth Kaikini	Sonu Nigam	
Munjane	167	"Hey Hoove"	S. Narayan	S. Narayan	Ravindra Soragavi	
Munjane	168	"Hey Manase"	S. Narayan	S. Narayan	Akash Talapatra	
Narasimha	169	"Sim Gim Illa"	Hamsalekha	Hamsalekha		
Parijatha	170	"Nee Mohisu"	Mano Murthy	Kaviraj		
Parijatha	171	"Oh Parijatha"	Mano Murthy	Kaviraj	Sonu Nigam	
Parijatha	172	"Nee Mohisu"(Unplugged)	Mano Murthy	Kaviraj		
Preethiya Loka	173	"Ee Preethi Bandakshana"	Sai Kiran	Raghu Charan	Karthik	
Prem Adda	174	"Baadigege"	V. Harikrishna	Prem	Prem	
Prem Adda	175	"Kalli Ivalu"	V. Harikrishna	V. Nagendra Prasad	Sonu Nigam	
Romeo	176	"Aalochane"	Arjun Janya	Kaviraj		

=== 2013 ===
Film	No	Song	Composer(s)	Lyricist(s)	Co-artist(s)
Ale	177	"Ale Ale"	Mano Murthy	Kaviraj	Shaan
Ale	178	"Manadha"(Duet)	Mano Murthy	Jayanth Kaikini	Sonu Nigam
Ale	179	"Manadha"(Female)	Mano Murthy	Jayanth Kaikini	
Aantharya	180	Usiru Bido"	Giridhar Divan	AP Arjun	
Andhar Bahar	181	"Maleyali Minda"	Vijay Prakash	Jayanth Kaikini	Vijay Prakash
Bachchan	182	"Sadha Ninna Kannali"	V. Harikrishna	Jayanth Kaikini	Sonu Nigam
Bangari	183	"Yenella Helona"	A. M. Neel	Jayanth Kaikini	Sonu Nigam
Barfi	184	"Oh Mahiyaave"	Arjun Janya	Jayanth Kaikini	Sonu Nigam
Barfi	185	"Kannali Kannidu"	Arjun Janya	Kaviraj	Sonu Nigam
Brindavana	186	"Bellam Belaga"	V. Harikrishna	V. Nagendra Prasad	Hemanth
Dilwala	187	"Jaadhoo"	Arjun Janya	Ananda Priay	Shankar Mahadevan
Ee Bhoomi Aa Bhanu	188	"Geleya Priyasakha"	S. Prem Kumar	B. H. Mallikarjun	
Galaate	189	"Manasaare Manaseri"	Jassie Gift	Kaviraj	
Mahanadi	190	"Kadalugala Giri"	AM Neel	V. Nagendra Prasad	
Mandahasa	191	"Kannanchinalli"	Veer Samarth	V. Nagendra Prasad	
Myna	192	"Modala Maleyanthe"(Duet)	Jassie Gift	Kaviraj	Sonu Nigam
Myna	193	"O Premada Poojaari"	Jassie Gift	Geethapriya	
Padhe Padhe	194	"Manasagideyo"	Satish Aryan	Manjunath Rao	Kunal Ganjawala
Sweety Nanna Jodi	195	"I Wanna Sing A Songu"	Arjun Janya	Chetan Kumar	
Sweety Nanna Jodi	196	"Manave"	Arjun Janya	Kaviraj	Sonu Nigam

=== 2014 ===
Film	No	Song	Composer(s)	Lyricist(s)	Co-artist(s)
Ambareesha	197	"Kannale"	V. Harikrishna	V. Nagendra Prasad	Sonu Nigam
Aryan	198	"Ondu Haaddu"	Jassie Gift	Kaviraj	KK
Aryan	199	"Usire Aadade"	Jassie Gift	Chandan Shetty	
Athi Aparoopa	200	"Aalangisu"	Mano Murthy	Kaviraj	Kunal Ganjawala
Athi Aparoopa	201	"Thumbali"	Mano Murthy	Jayanth Kaikini	
Ee Dil Helide Nee Bekantha	202	"Modala Barige"	Satish Aryan	S Sridhara	Satish Aryan
Gajakesari	203	"Kannada Siri"	V. Harikrishna	K. Kalyan	Shankar Mahadevan
Hara	204	"Birugaali"(Duet)	Jassie Gift	Jayanth Kaikini	Haricharan
Hara	205	"Birugaali"(Female)	Jassie Gift	Jayanth Kaikini	
Mr. and Mrs. Ramachari	206	"Upavaasa"	V. Harikrishna	Ghouse Peer	Sonu Nigam
Rangan Style	207	"Punaha Punaha"	Gurukiran	Vigneshwara Vishwa	Shaan
Ulidavaru Kandanthe	208	"Kaakig Banna"	B. Ajaneesh Loknath	Rakshit Shetty	

=== 2015 ===
Film	No	Song	Composer(s)	Lyricist(s)	Co-artist(s)
1st Rank Raju	209	"Shuru Shuru"	Kiran Ravindranath	Hrudaya Shiva	
Abhinetri	210	"Naviradha Nalume"	Mano Murthy	Jayanth Kaikini	
Abhinetri	211	"Naa Nimma"	Mano Murthy	V. Nagendra Prasad	
Abhinetri	212	"Daiva Baredha"	Mano Murthy	Sathish Pradhan	
Abhinetri	213	"Thamnam Thamnam"	Rajan–Nagendra	Chi. Udayashankar	Shaan
Abhinetri	214	"Abhinetri Horateya"	Mano Murthy	Jayanth Kaikini	
Endendigu	215	"Ninnalle"	V. Harikrishna	K. Kalyan	Sonu Nigam
Khushi Khushiyagi	216	"Athiyayithu"	Anup Rubens	Jayanth Kaikini	Ankit Tiwari
Krishna Leela	217	"Kaadiruve Ninagagi"	Sridhar V. Sambhram	Shashank	
Lodde	218	"Bannada Hoovina"	Charan Banzo	Jayanth Kaikini	
Luv U Alia	219	"Kanase Kanninda"	Jassie Gift	Kaviraj	Karthik
Namak Haaram	220	"Manaseko Hegigaa"	Satish Aryan	Gurunath Boragi	Sonu Nigam
Neene Bari Neene	221	"Nee Elli Mohana"	Mano Murthy	Vinayak Bhat	
Rhaatee	222	"Raja Rani"(Female)	V. Harikrishna	A. P. Arjun	
RX Soori	223	"Suri Suri"	Arjun Janya	K. Kalyan	Harsha Sadananda
Sharp Shooter	224	"Kannalle"	M. S. Shiva Santosh	Ghouse Peer	Karthik

=== 2016 ===
Film	No	Song	Composer(s)	Lyricist(s)	Co-artist(s)
1/2 Mentlu	225	"Godemelu"(Female)	BJ Bharath	Lakshmi Dinesh	
Badmaash	226	"Maayavi Kanase"	Judah Sandhy	Jayanth Kaikini	Karthik
Badmaash	227	"Maayavi Kanase"(Unplugged)	Judah Sandhy	Jayanth Kaikini	Karthik
Crazy Boy	228	"Vinanthi Madalilla"	Jassie Gift	V. Nagendra Prasad	Shaan
Crazy Boy	229	"Murida Sethuveya"	Jassie Gift	V. Nagendra Prasad	Santhosh Venky
Ishtakamya	230	"Nee Nanagoskara"	B. Ajaneesh Loknath	Nagathihalli Chandrashekhar	Ajaneesh Loknath
Ishtakamya	231	"Thangali"	B. Ajaneesh Loknath	Yogaraj Bhat	
Ishtakamya	232	"Nee Nanagoskara"(Female)	B. Ajaneesh Loknath	Nagathihalli Chandrashekhar	
Kirik Party	233	"Neenire Saniha"	B. Ajaneesh Loknath	Kiran Kaverappa	
Kotigobba 2	234	"Saaluthillave"	D. Imman	V. Nagendra Prasad	Vijay Prakash
Krishna-Rukku	235	"Helilla Yarallu Naanu"	Sridhar V Sambhram	Jayanth Kaikini	Sonu Nigam
Madha Mathu Manasi	236	"Madha Mathu Manasi"	Mano Murthy	Sathish Pradhan	
Madha Mathu Manasi	237	"Vismithanadhe"	Mano Murthy	Sathish Pradhan	Sonu Nigam
Madha Mathu Manasi	238	"Nachle Nachle"	Mano Murthy	Sathish Pradhan	Sonu Nigam
Maduveya Mamatheya Kareyole	239	"Marana Dandane"	V. Harikrishna	Kaviraj	Sonu Nigam
Mast Mohabbat	240	"Arithe Sandhesha"	Mano Murthy	K. Kalyan	
Mast Mohabbat	241	"Naana Bannadha"	Mano Murthy	Raghu Shastry	
Mungaru Male 2	242	"Kanasalu"	Arjun Janya	Shashank Vyas	
Mungaru Male 2	243	"Onte Songu"	Arjun Janya	Gopi Iyengar, Umesh Pilikudelu	Armaan Malik, Swaroop Khan
Sundaranga Jaana	244	"Ee Santhelu Siguva"	B. Ajaneesh Loknath	Jayanth Kaikini	Santhosh Venky
The Great Story of Sodabuddi	245	"Yeno Nannali"	Mithun M S	Vijay V	

=== 2017 ===
Film	No	Song	Composer(s)	Lyricist(s)	Co-artist(s)
Hebbuli	246	"Usire Usire"	Arjun Janya	Kaviraj	Shaan
Rogue	247	"Ninagagi Naa Kadiruve"	Sunil Kashyap	V. Nagendra Prasad	
Manasu Malligey	248	"Adaviyolage"	Ajay–Atul	Kaviraj	
Chakravarthy	249	"Ondu Malebillu"	Arjun Janya	V. Nagendra Prasad	Armaan Malik
Chakravarthy	250	"Matthe Maleyagide"	Arjun Janya	Dr. Umesh	Sonu Nigam
Simha Hakida Hejje	251	"Nee Nannolavige"	R. Hari Babu	Mohan Malayamarutha	
Simha Hakida Hejje	252	"Ee Khali Hrudhayake"	R. Hari Babu	Manju Kavi	Sonu Nigam
Maasthi Gudi	253	"Chippinolagade"	Sadhu Kokila	Kaviraj	
Maasthi Gudi	254	"Summane"	Sadhu Kokila	Kaviraj	
Naa Panta Kano	255	"Tunturu"	S. Narayan	S. Narayan	Shaan
Jani	256	"Kaddu Kaddu Nodi"	Jassie Gift	Raj Kiran	Shashank Sheshagiri
Mass Leader	257	"Geleya Ennale"	Veer Samarth	V. Nagendra Prasad	Chetan Gandharva
Mugulu Nage	258	"Kannadi Illada Orinali"	V. Harikrishna	Jayanth Kaikini	
Mugulu Nage	259	"Ninna Snehadinda"	V. Harikrishna	Yogaraj Bhat	
Tarak	260	"Mathadu Nee"	Arjun Janya	Jayanth Kaikini	Armaan Malik
Raajaru	261	"Bhagilige Bandavane"	V. Sridhar	Yogaraj Bhat	

=== 2018 ===
Film	No	Song	Composer(s)	Lyricist(s)	Co-artist(s)
Raju Kannada Medium	262	"Marula Neenu"	Kiran Ravindranath	Hrudaya Shiva	
Naanu L/O Jaanu	263	"Yelumele Yelu Geleya"	Srinath Vijay	V. Nagendra Prasad	Haricharan
Huccha 2	264	"Thumba Preethiso"	Anoop Seelin	V. Nagendra Prasad	
Saaguva Daariyalli	265	"Edurali Ninthu"	S. Nagu	K. Ram Narayan	
O Premave	266	"Gari Gedari"	Anand Rajavikram-Rahul Dev	Jayanth Kaikini	Sonu Nigam
Kichchu	267	"Spandana"	Arjun Janya	Ghouse Pheer	
Edakallu Guddada Mele	268	"Mugulunage"	Ashic Arun	Kiran Kaverappa	Karthik
Kannadakkaagi Ondannu Otti	269	"Ommomme Nannannu"	Arjun Janya	Yogaraj Bhat	
MMCH	270	"Megha Megha"	V. Sridhar	Ghouse Pheer	
The Villain	271	"Nodivalandava"	Arjun Janya	Prem	Armaan Malik
The Villain	272	"Rana Rana Raavana"	Arjun Janya	Prem	Prem

=== 2019 ===
Film	No	Song	Composer(s)	Lyricist(s)	Co-artist(s)
Fortuner	273	"Kaiya Chivuti Omme"	Poornachandra Tejaswi	Hemanth Kumar	
Natasaarvabhowma	274	"Yaaro Naanu"	D. Imman	Kaviraj	
Yajamana	275	"Ondu Munjane"	V. Harikrishna	Kaviraj	Sonu Nigam
Yaagire Yaaruntu	276	"Dhyaanisi Kaayuvenu"	Bharath B. J.	Madan Bellisalu	Chintan Vikas
99	277	"Heege Dora"(Female)	Arjun Janya	Kaviraj	
99	278	"Navilugari"	Arjun Janya	Kaviraj	
99	279	"Anisuthide"	Arjun Janya	Kaviraj	Sanjith Hegde
99	280	"Naa Sanihake Innu"	Arjun Janya	Kaviraj	
Amar	281	"Summane Heege Ninnane"	Arjun Janya	Kaviraj	
Amar	281	"Summane Heege Ninnane"	Arjun Janya	Kaviraj	Sonu Nigam
Amar	282	"Onde Aetige"	Arjun Janya	Kaviraj	Armaan Malik
Amar	283	"Kambani"	Arjun Janya	Kaviraj	Sonu Nigam
Kurukshetra	284	"Chaaruthanthi"	V. Harikrishna	V. Nagendra Prasad	Sonu Nigam
Kurukshetra	285	"Uthare Uthare"	V. Harikrishna	V. Nagendra Prasad	Santhosh Venky
Kiss	286	"Neene Modalu Neene Kone"	Adi hari	A. P. Arjun	
Sye Raa Narasimha Reddy (D)	287	"Sye Raa Title Track"	Amit Trivedi		Sunidhi Chauhan
Sye Raa Narasimha Reddy (D)	288	"Adharam Ankitham"	Amit Trivedi		Vijay Prakash
Savarna Deergha Sandhi	289	"Kolaladena"	Mano Murthy	Veerendra Shetty	
Savarna Deergha Sandhi	290	"Madhu Madhura"	Mano Murthy	Veerendra Shetty	
Dabangg 3 (D)	291	"Thabbibadene"	Sajid–Wajid	Anup Bhandari	Jubin Nautiyal

=== 2021 ===
Film	No	Song	Composer(s)	Lyricist(s)	Co-artist(s)
Roberrt	292	"Kannu Hodiyaka"	Arjun Janya	Yogaraj Bhat	
Yuvarathnaa	293	"Neenaade Naa"	S. Thaman	Ghouse Peer	Armaan Malik
Kotigobba 3	294	"Nee Kotiyali Obbane"	Arjun Janya	Yogaraj Bhat	

=== 2022 ===
Film	No	Song	Composer(s)	Lyricist(s)	Co-artist(s)
Cobra	295	"Dumbi Dumbi"	A. R. Rahman	Pavan Bhat	Nakul Abhyankar
Ponniyin Selvan: I	296	"Rakshasa Maamane"	A. R. Rahman	Jayanth Kaikini	Vijay Prakash, Mahesh Vinayakram
Raymo	297	"Hodare Hogu"	Arjun Janya	Kaviraj	
Rowdy Fello	298	"Anandhavo Anandhave"	Nakul Abhyankar	Vasuki Vaibhav	
Bond Ravi	299	"Banthu Nannalli"	Mano Murthy	Jayanth Kaikini	
Bond Ravi	300	"Kanusugala"	Mano Murthy	Chinmayi Bhavikere	

=== 2023 ===
Film	No	Song	Composer(s)	Lyricist(s)	Co-artist(s)
Sambhrama	301	"Keluthide Ee Hrudaya"	Mano Murthy	Jayant Kaikini	

=== 2024 ===
Film	No	Song	Composer(s)	Lyricist(s)	Co-artist(s)
Pranayam	302	"Ninage Sigalu"(Female)	Mano Murthy	Chinmay Bhavikere	
Pranayam	303	"Sameepa"	Mano Murthy	Hrudaya Shiva	Kunal Ganjawala
Pranayam	304	"Haadive Hoomale"	Mano Murthy	Jayanth Kaikini	
Pushpa 2 (Dubbed)	305	"Nodoka" (The Couple Song)	Devi Sri Prasad	Varadaraj Chikkaballapura	

=== 2025 ===
Film	No	Song	Composer(s)	Lyricist(s)	Co-artist(s)
Gajarama	306	"Ella Helabekide"	Mano Murthy	Jayanth Kaikini	Shaan
Kuladalli Keelyavudo	307	"Bhayaveke"	Mano Murthy	Jayanth Kaikini	
Aleva Moda	308	"Shaharavanu"	Mano Murthy	Jayanth Kaikini	

=== 2026 ===
Film	No	Song	Composer(s)	Lyricist(s)	Co-artist(s)
Pyaar	309	"Ondhe Maathali"	Palani D Senapathy	Kaviraj	Sonu Nigam
Koragajja	310	"Gaali Gandha"	Gopi Sundar	Sudheer Attavar	Armaan Malik
America America 2	311	"Run Run"	Mano Murthy	Nagathihalli Chandrashekhar	Shankar Mahadevan
America America 2	312	"Ee Dhareya"	Mano Murthy	Nagathihalli Chandrashekhar	Rajesh Krishnan
America America 2	313	"Ee Dhareya" (Female)	Mano Murthy	Nagathihalli Chandrashekhar	
America America 2	314	"Kitakiyalli Chandira"	Mano Murthy	Savita Nagabhushan	
America America 2	315	"Hogibidu Chandira"	Mano Murthy	Savita Nagabhushan	SaReGaMaPa Li’l Champs
Brindavihari	316	"Naadasunaada"	Hesham Abdul Wahab	V. Nagendra Prasad	

=== Delayed ===
Year	Film	No	Song	Composer(s)	Writer(s)	Co-artist(s)
2015	Haadi Beedi Love Story	317	"Preethi Huttodelli"	C. R. Bobby	Chandrashekar Mavinakunte	Vijay Prakash
2015	Haadi Beedi Love Story	318	"Maralina Mele"	C. R. Bobby	V. Nagendra Prasad	
2015	Haadi Beedi Love Story	319	"Preethi Haadhi"(Female)	C. R. Bobby	Chandrashekar Mavinakunte	
2017	BMW	320	"Kaayuthini Konevarugu"	Sriram Gandharva	Gabdharva Raya Rawuth	
2018	19	321	"Aleyu Mathadide"	Mithun M S	Vijay Vishwamani	

== Non-film songs ==
Year	Album	Song	Composer(s)	Writer(s)	Co-artist(s)
2008	Endendhu	"Sanihavu Illavo"	Vijay Karun	Vijayan East Coast	
2018	Baandevi	"Keluvudellede"	Sunitha Chandrakumar	Kuvempu	

== Frequent collaborations ==
=== Arjun Janya ===
No	Film	Song
1	Yuga	"Yaavano Yaavano"
2	Yuga	"Chanda Kane Chanda"
3	Birugaali	"Hoovina Baanadante"
4	Machchaa	"Neeli Neeli Aakashadali"
5	Sanchari	"Gaaliye"
6	Sanchari	"Kanna Saneyalli"
7	Kempe Gowda	"Tara Tara"
8	Rajadhani	"Midiva Ninna"
9	Alemari	"Neeli Neeli"
10	Alemari	"Neeli Neeli(Pathos)"
11	Lucky	"Hoovina Santhege"
12	Romeo	"Aalochane"
13	Barfi	"Oh Mahiyaave"
14	Barfi	"Kannali Kannidu"
15	Dilwala	"Jaadhoo"
16	Sweety Nanna Jodi	"I Wanna Sing A Songu"
17	Sweety Nanna Jodi	"Manavae"
18	RX Soori	"Suri Suri"
19	Mungaru Male 2	"Kanasalu Nooru Baari"
20	Mungaru Male 2	"Onte Songu"
21	Hebbuli	"Usire Usire"
22	Chakravarthy	"Ondu Malebillu"
23	Chakravarthy	"Matthe Maleyagide"
24	Tarak	"Mathadu Nee"
25	Kichchu	"Spandana"
26	Kannadakkaagi Ondannu Otti	"Ommomme Nannannu"
27	The Villain	"Nodivalandava"
28	The Villain	"Rana Rana Raavana"
29	99	"Naa Sanihake Innu"
30	99	"Heege Dora"(FemCGCGG ale)
31	99	"Navilugari"
32	99	"Anisuthide"
33	Amar	"Summane HeegVJHJUYFHUL e Ninnane"
34	Amar	"Onde Aetige"
35	Amar	"Kambani"
36	Roberrt	"Kannu Hodiyaka"
37	Kotigobba 3	"Nee Kotiyali Obbane"
38	Raymo	"Hodare Hogu"
