= Edagaiye Apaghatakke Karana =

2025 Kannada comedy film

- Theatrical release poster
- Directed by: Samarth Kadkol
- Written by: Samarth Kadkol; Dialogues: Samarth B Kadkol; Rahul Parvatikar; Sripad Joshi
- Produced by: Samarth B Kadkol; Rajesh Keelambi; Ranjini Prasanna; Gurudath Ganiga
- Starring: Diganth; Dhanu Harsha; Nidhi Subbaiah; Radhika Narayan; Krishna Hebbale; Saurav Lokesh
- Cinematography: Abhimanyu Sadanandan
- Edited by: Praveen Shivanna
- Music by: Praddyotan
- Production companies: Hyphen Pictures; Keelambi Media labs
- Distributed by: Janani Pictures
- Release date: 13 June 2025
- Running time: 122 minutes
- Country: India
- Language: Kannada

Edagaiye Apaghatakke Karana (transl. Left hand is the cause of accident) is a 2025 Indian Kannada black comedy suspense thriller film written and directed by Samarth Kadkol, who co-produced the film with Gurudath Ganiga under Hyphen Pictures and Gurudatha Ganiga Films Banner. The film stars Diganth, Dhanu Harsha, Nidhi Subbaiah in lead roles. The music for the film is composed by Praddyotan and cinematography by Abhimanyu Sadanandan.

== Plot summary ==
Lohith is a mild-mannered, left-handed IT professional who works night shifts from home. Throughout his life, Lohith has struggled against societal biases: his teachers attempted to correct his writing hand, relatives insisted on visiting astrologers, and he's constantly forced to adapt in a world built for right-handers. One evening, on a secret date at his girlfriend Pooja's apartment, casual conversation about the challenges faced by left-handers turns tense when an unexpected accident occurs. Lohith suddenly finds himself entangled in a high-stakes scenario—locked inside the apartment, he must contend with evidence of violence and multiple bodies as unforeseen events cascade around him.

In flashbacks and dialogue, the film reveals how small inconveniences—like using right-handed tools or awkward handshakes—fuel a growing sense of paranoia. The date evening spirals into chaos when an unexpected death implicates Lohith, plunging him into a criminal web involving three corpses, a suspicious police inspector, and a mysterious stranger known only as “Casper”. A pivotal moment arrives when a stranger (played by Nirup Bhandari in a cameo) intervenes as Lohith contemplates suicide on his rooftop. This intervention redirects the narrative into darker territory and catalyzes a chain of darkly comedic and suspenseful developments.

The narrative leads to a climax where Lohith must confront the real culprits behind the mess, expose the manipulations of major players (such as Pooja's uncle and other suspicious figures), and clear his name. The tone throughout balances whimsical dark comedy with escalating suspense, culminating in a resolution that reveals hidden truths while maintaining a clever detachment from melodrama.

== Cast ==
- Diganth Manchale as Lohith
- Dhanu Harsha as Radhika and Sam, dual role
- Nidhi Subbaiah as Pooja
- Radhika Narayan as Shraddha
- Krishna Hebbale as Inspector Prakash
- Saurav Lokesh as Praneeth
- Shabarish Kabbinale as Hemnath, Security guard
- Nanda Kumar
- Prashanth Natana as Pooja's uncle
- Rajesh as Lohith' father
- Nirup Bhandari as Raghav (in a cameo appearance)

== Production ==
Samarth Kadkol who had directed short films and worked as associate director for Kotigobba 3 was set to make his feature film debut with Antagoni Shetty starring Rishab Shetty. However the same could not materialize owing to covid pandemic and delays.

He then announced his debut movie on 13 August 2021 on occasion of International Lefthander's day with Diganth set to star as the lead actor. A year later on the same day Dhanu Harsha who was one of the runner-up of Bengaluru round of Times Fresh Face, 2022 was reported to play one of the lead role in the film. Further it was reported that Nidhi Subbaiah was teaming up with Diganth after 12 years of their successful film Pancharangi. A few days later Radhika Narayan joined the cast of the film for a prominent role. Nirup Bhandari was said to play an extended cameo role in the film.

The film went on floors on 9 September 2022 in Yelahanka, Bengaluru where majority of the shooting took place, after Diganth recovered from his injury. Dubbing of the film began around May 2023.

== Soundtrack ==
Ajaneesh Loknath was said to be composing the music for the film when announced, however later Praddyotan was chose to compose the music and background score of the film.

== Release ==
=== Marketing ===
The film teamed up with Vega helmets and released a special helmet for left handers on occasion of International Left hander's day on 13 August 2023. The team released special posters of the film on occasion of Deepavali in 2023, Birthdays of the lead actors Diganth, Dhanu Harsha, Nidhi Subbaiah and for New Year and Sankaranti in 2024. The teaser of the film was released on 28 December 2023 on Diganth's birthday by Kichcha Sudeep.

=== Theatrical release ===
The film was set to be released in February 2024; however, it was later postponed.
