= The Invisible Guest =

2016 film by Oriol Paulo

- Theatrical release poster
- Spanish: Contratiempo
- Directed by: Oriol Paulo
- Written by: Oriol Paulo; Lara Sendim
- Produced by: Mercedes Gamero; Adrian Guerra; Sandra Hermida; Mikel Lejarza; Eneko Lizarraga; Núria Valls
- Starring: Mario Casas; Ana Wagener; José Coronado; Bárbara Lennie
- Cinematography: Xavi Jiménez
- Edited by: Jaume Martí
- Music by: Fernando Velázquez
- Production companies: Think Studio; Atresmedia Cine; Colosé Producciones; Nostromo Pictures
- Distributed by: Warner Bros. Pictures
- Release dates: 23 September 2016 (Fantastic Fest); 6 January 2017 (Spain)
- Running time: 106 minutes
- Country: Spain
- Language: Spanish
- Budget: €4 million
- Box office: $31.2 million

The Invisible Guest (Spanish: Contratiempo, lit. 'Setback') is a 2016 Spanish mystery thriller film directed and co-written by Oriol Paulo. It stars Mario Casas alongside Bárbara Lennie, José Coronado, and Ana Wagener.

The film was released in Spain on 6 January 2017. It opened to mostly positive reviews from critics and finished with a modest domestic box office, but later found its popularity in the international market of China where it topped $25 million in box-office earning. The film was a commercial success, grossing $31.2 million worldwide against its €4 million budget. The Invisible Guest has spawned six remakes in different languages.

== Plot ==
Businessman Adrián Doria is out on bail after being arrested for the murder of his lover, Laura Vidal. His lawyer, Félix Leiva, hires a famous attorney named Virginia Goodman, who visits him at his apartment with the news that the prosecutor has found a witness who will be testifying in front of a judge soon; they have just three hours to come up with a defense, so Virginia urges Adrián to tell her the whole truth.

Adrián tells Virginia how he and Laura had ended their affair but received a call blackmailing them to come to a rural hotel with €100,000. At the hotel, Adrián was knocked unconscious and awoke to find Laura dead in the bathroom. With the door and the windows locked from inside, the police are quick to declare Adrián as the prime suspect.

Adrián then narrates further back. As he and Laura drive back to Barcelona from their cabin, Adrián swerves to avoid a deer, clipping another car that hits a tree. Although they are unhurt, the other car's driver, banker Daniel Garrido, dies. Laura rationalizes that it is not entirely their fault, since Daniel was texting and not wearing his seat belt. When another car approaches, Laura hides the body, and she and Adrián pretend to exchange insurance information. She pretends to answer Daniel's phone when it rings, and the driver leaves. Laura waits for a tow truck in Adrián's car, which will not start, while Adrián dumps Daniel's car in a lake with the body inside.

Laura later picks up Adrián and tells him how his car was repaired. An automotive engineer, Tomás, drove by and offered to help Laura, who falsely claimed she had hit a deer. He towed the car to his house to fix it. While talking to Tomás' wife, retired actress and innkeeper Elvira, Laura realized Daniel was their son. Laura is seen adjusting the driver's seat, arousing Tomás's suspicion about the car owner. Adrián sells his car to a scrapyard, reports it stolen, and parts ways with Laura.

Adrián is summoned to the police, as Tomás has reported his plate number. Félix concocts an alibi for Adrián and manages to remove his name from the case file. When the news reports that Daniel is on the run after embezzling money from the bank he works at, Adrián confronts Laura, whose husband works in the same bank as Daniel. Laura admits that she stole a sum of money Daniel had been transporting in his car to cover their tracks. Laura threatens to frame him if he goes out to expose her.

Tomás poses as a reporter during a press conference attended by Adrián, noticing that he pulls out the same lighter he saw when fixing the car. He begs Adrián to reveal the location of Daniel's body so he can bury his son, but to no avail. Days later, Adrián is blackmailed and receives instructions to take Laura to the rural hotel with €100,000. Adrián thinks the blackmailer may be the passing driver, who had perhaps followed him afterwards.

Virginia suggests that Adrián could claim he saw the face of the man who hit him in the rural hotel room and then convince a court that his attacker was Tomás. Because Elvira ran the hotel, she could have arranged an escape route for her husband and then concealed it before the police noticed. Adrián then reveals he has always known it was Tomás but wanted to test Virginia as he is unsure of her talents. Virginia suggests planting an item belonging to Laura in Daniel's car, and claiming she acted alone. Adrián reveals the location of the sunken car, and confesses that Daniel was still alive when he pushed the car in. Virginia is noticeably horrified but quickly composes herself before Adrián notices.

Armed with the knowledge that he committed murder, Virginia suggests Adrián is lying about Laura being the femme fatale behind their deceit and speculates that she lured him to the hotel with the money in an attempt to come clean to Daniel's parents. Virginia also reveals that Tomás has been stalking Adrián, Félix and even herself, and points to an apartment across the street where Tomás is lurking. Fearing for his life, Adrián finally admits that he killed Laura and staged the scene.

Félix leaves a message on Adrián's voicemail, urging him to call back. Virginia suggests Adrián return the call before stepping outside. Félix claims to have located the other driver and assures Adrián his silence has been bought. However, their call is interrupted by interference from a recording device, which Adrián finds hidden in Virginia's pen. He recalls Virginia turning off his phone earlier; rifling through her "notes", he finds them to be blank. Looking into Tomás' apartment, he sees "Virginia" removing makeup and a wig, revealing herself as Elvira. With the recording of his confession, Tomás calls the police as the real Virginia Goodman arrives at Adrián's apartment.

== Cast ==
- Mario Casas as Adrián Doria, a successful businessman
- Bárbara Lennie as Laura Vidal, Adrián's lover
- Ana Wagener as Virginia Goodman (Fake); Elvira Garrido, Daniel's mother and a retired actress
- José Coronado as Tomás Garrido, Daniel's father
- Iñigo Gastesi as Daniel Garrido Ávila, 23-year-old banker and murder victim
- Francesc Orella as Félix Leiva, Adrián's attorney
- Blanca Martínez as Virginia Goodman, a retired attorney hired by Félix as co-counsel
- Manel Dueso as Inspector Milán, lead investigator in Laura's murder
- San Yélamos as Sonia Doria, Adrián's wife
- David Selvas as Bruno Vidal, Laura's husband
- Paco Tous as Conductor

== Filming ==
The film was shot in 2015 (from March 10, 2015, to July 12, 2015), in Terrassa, a city in Catalonia, Spain, and in other locations in Spain, such as the city of Barcelona, the region of Biscay, and Vall de Núria.

== Reception ==
=== Box office ===
The film grossed €3.68 million in Spain. Out of Spain, the film was a surprise hit in China. Initially, the film was not released in China, but it was picked up by illegal file sharing sites and amassed huge downloads. The positive word-of-mouth prompted a local film distributor to contact director Oriol Paulo and discuss releasing it in Chinese theaters. The film debuted on 7,000 screens in China on Sep 15, 2017, eight months after its release in Spain. It eventually grossed over CN¥172.4 million (€26 million), becoming the most successful Spanish film ever in China.

=== Critical response ===
On the review aggregator website Rotten Tomatoes, 67% of 9 critics' reviews are positive, with an average rating of 7.0/10.

== Remakes ==
- The Italian-language film The Invisible Witness (2018), starring Riccardo Scamarcio, is a remake of this film.
- The Indian Hindi-language film Badla (2019), starring Amitabh Bachchan and Taapsee Pannu, is a remake of this film.
- The Indian Telugu-language film Evaru (2019), starring Adivi Sesh and Regina Cassandra, is loosely inspired by the film.
- 2022 Korean language film Confession, starring So Ji-Sub and Yunjin Kim, is a remake of this film.
- The Indian Kannada-language film Yadha Yadha Hi (2023), starring Hariprriya and Diganth, is a remake the above-mentioned Telugu-language film Evaru both loosely follow this film thread.
- The 2023 Chinese language film Hide The Sea (The Invisible Guest), starring Greg Hsu and Janine Chang, is remake of this film.
- 2026 Indonesian remake, The Invisible Guest, is produced by Falcon Pictures. Starring Mawar Eva de Jongh, Reza Rahadian, and Arifin Putra.
