= Male Bille =

- VCD cover
- Directed by: K Mahesh Sukhadhare
- Produced by: H R Kodanda Ramu
- Starring: Diganth; Akshay; Pragna
- Cinematography: Cinetech Soori
- Edited by: R Dorairaj
- Music by: Manikanth Kadri
- Release date: 4 December 2009
- Country: India
- Language: Kannada

Male Bille is a 2009 Indian Kannada-language film directed by K Mahesh Sukhadhare starring Diganth, Akshay, and Pragna in lead roles.

== Cast ==
- Diganth as Akash
- Akshay as Anand
- Pragna as Anjali
- Amogh
- Ramakrishna
- Doddanna
- Komal
- Sharan
- M. S. Umesh
- Mandeep Roy

== Music ==
Male Bille

Soundtrack album by Manikanth Kadri
- Released: 2009
- Recorded: 2009
- Genre: Feature film soundtrack
- Length: 25:28
- Language: Kannada

Official audio
- Male Bille - Full Album on YouTube

Track listing
No.	Title	Singer(s)	Length
1.	"Duddidre Duniya Maga"	Hemanth Kumar, Mysore Benny, Picchalli Srinivas, Chinthan Jenni	5:17
2.	"Sidukabyada Sidukabyada"	Raghu Dixit, Vinaya Karthik	5:08
3.	"Naanu Ninna Muddisuvaase"	Karthik	5:45
4.	"Chandamaama Chandamaama"	Haricharan, Anuradha Bhat	5:16
5.	"Malebille Malebille"	Chinmayi	4:02
Total length:			25:28

== Reception ==
=== Critical response ===
R G Vijayasarathy of Rediff.com scored the film at 2 out of 5 stars and wrote "The real asset of the film is Manikanth Kadri's music. Two songs Chandamaama, Chandamaama and Nanage Ninna Muddisuvaase are well composed though the choreography is found lacking. The background music oscillates between good and ordinary. Suri's cinematographic work is above average". A critic from Deccan Herald wrote "Ramakrishna, Sangeetha and Doddanna are all well-placed. Hopefully, ‘Malebillhe’ will be the last such role for Digant. Finally, rainbow is known as Kamanabillu or Malebillu in Kannada, not ‘Malebillhe’ or ‘Malebille’!" A critic from Bangalore Mirror wrote "The background music is loud and hampers a decent sleep while watching the film. The camerawork is better than most other aspects of the film. Sukadhare’s break from filmmaking has not worked for him or the audience". A critic from Sify.com wrote "There are two lovely songs scored by Manikanth Khadri. The doyen in Saxophone Khadri Gopalanath has lent a small tune in this film. The camerawork is the best part of the film".
