= Evaru =

2019 film by Venkat Ramji

- Theatrical release poster
- Directed by: Venkat Ramji
- Screenplay by: Venkat Ramji
- Dialogues by: Abburi Ravi
- Story by: Oriol Paulo
- Based on: The Invisible Guest
- Produced by: Pearl V. Potluri; Param V. Potluri; Kavin Anne
- Starring: Adivi Sesh; Naveen Chandra; Regina Cassandra; Murali Sharma
- Cinematography: Vamsi Patchipulusu
- Edited by: Garry BH
- Music by: Sricharan Pakala
- Production company: PVP Cinema
- Distributed by: Sri Venkateswara Creations
- Release date: 15 August 2019
- Running time: 118 minutes
- Country: India
- Language: Telugu
- Budget: ₹8 crore
- Box office: est. ₹10 crore

Evaru (transl. Who) is a 2019 Indian Telugu-language crime thriller film directed by Venkat Ramji. The film was produced by Pearl V. Potluri, Param V. Potluri and Kavin Anne under PVP Cinema. The film stars Adivi Sesh, Regina Cassandra, Naveen Chandra and Murali Sharma. Evaru is a loose adaptation of the 2016 Spanish film The Invisible Guest (2016).

The plot follows the story of corrupt cop Vikram Vasudev as he investigates a seemingly open-and-shut case of a woman killing her rapist. The music is composed by Sricharan Pakala and editing by Garry BH. The film was released on 15 August 2019, the film opened to positive reviews from both critics and audiences, garnering praise for its screenplay, direction, performances, and plot twists. The film was remade in Kannada as Yadha Yadha Hi (2023).

== Plot ==
Sameera Maha, a successful businesswoman, kills DSP Ashok Krishna in a resort room, claiming self-defense following an attempted rape. Ashok’s influential family hires the prestigious criminal defense lawyer Ratnakar as the prosecutor. Desperate to cover her tracks, Sameera’s defense attorney bribes Vikram Vasudev, a corrupt Sub-Inspector from Coonoor, to ensure the prosecution finds no incriminating evidence. Vikram meets Sameera in a secluded hotel room to extract the absolute truth under the guise of helping her construct an airtight alibi.

When Sameera insists that Ashok forced himself on her, Vikram dismantles her story with evidence detailing her past. He reveals that her husband, CEO Rahul Maha, is secretly homosexual and that Sameera serves as a "beard" to maintain his public heterosexual image. Furthermore, Sameera and Ashok were college sweethearts who had separated due to class differences but rekindled a passionate, secret affair two years prior.

Vikram then shifts the conversation to a missing persons case he has been investigating. A year earlier, a teenage cancer patient named Adarsh Varma reported his father, Vinay, missing. Driven by a bribe from Adarsh, Vikram pursued the case, eventually growing committed to helping Adarsh despite intense pressure from his superiors to drop it. His investigation revealed that Vinay had received frequent calls from Ashok's police station and that his damaged car was abandoned near a resort building. On the night of the disappearance, Adarsh and his mother had given a lift to a stranded hitchhiker who went by the name "Vaishnavi," but she vanished immediately upon their arrival home.

Following Vinay's last known coordinates to a hairpin turn in Coonoor, Vikram found a broken side-view mirror belonging to a black rental car booked under the name Vaishnavi Krishna by her husband, Ashok. Later, Adarsh sneaked into a high-profile event in Hyderabad to confront Ashok. When Ashok inadvertently confirmed he knew Vinay and pulled a gun on the boy, Vikram intervened. As they were being escorted out, Adarsh spotted the event's guest of honor, realizing that the woman his family gave a ride to was actually Sameera.

Faced with Vikram's evidence—including Sameera's old cellphone found in the forest covered in Vinay's blood—Sameera finally confesses. While driving to a secret rendezvous with Ashok, she accidentally struck Vinay with her car. A drunk Ashok verbally abused the injured Vinay before they encountered him again at a resort building Ashok wanted to buy. Vinay, a family friend of Rahul, recognized Sameera, warned her to end the affair, and refused to sell. Enraged, Ashok punched Vinay over a fence into the forest below. Discovering Vinay was still barely breathing, Ashok stopped Sameera from calling an ambulance and killed him with a boulder. While Ashok hid the corpse, a panicked Sameera fled and hitchhiked with Adarsh and his mother, only realizing they were Vinay's family after discovering she had mistakenly pocketed Vinay's phone. She left the device in their car and fled, with Ashok eventually picking her up.

A year later, an anonymous blackmailer demanded ₹2 crore from the lovers. Sameera claims that while she and Ashok were at the resort planning to confess, Ashok attacked her to save his own skin, forcing her to kill him in self-defense.

Vikram fiercely rejects this narrative. He reveals that he was the blackmailer and that Ashok genuinely intended to confess, having left his phone recording in his pocket during the meeting. When Ashok informed Sameera of his plan, she seduced and then murdered him before staging the rape scene. Cornered, Sameera offers Vikram the ₹2 crore bribe to dispose of Vinay's body and pin both murders entirely on Ashok. To secure the deal, Sameera confesses to the final missing puzzle piece: after the initial fall, she found Vinay alive and running along a highway, tracked him down, murdered him, and buried his body at a construction site next to a religious structure.

Suddenly, Vikram reveals a shocking twist: the room is entirely bugged, and the police are standing outside. As Sameera pulls out a gun, the real police force bursts in to arrest her for the murders of both Vinay and Ashok. Sameera screams accusations of Vikram's corruption, but the lead officer steps forward and reveals that he is the real SI Vikram Vasudev. The man who just extracted her confession is actually Adarsh Varma.

After Vikram was pressured to abandon the investigation, Adarsh spent a year recovering from cancer while meticulously gathering evidence against Sameera. Following Ashok's murder, Adarsh convinced the real, honest Vikram to let him impersonate him to break Sameera's psychological defense. The film concludes with Adarsh and his mother arriving at the construction site to retrieve Vinay’s body, finally bringing closure to their family.

== Cast ==
- Adivi Sesh as Sub inspector Vikram Vasudev (Fake) / Adarsh Varma
- Regina Cassandra as Sameera 'Sam' Maha
- Naveen Chandra as DSP Ashok Krishna IPS
- Murali Sharma as Vinay Varma
- Nihal Kodhaty as Adarsh Varma
- Pavitra Lokesh as Adarsh Varma's mother
- Raja Ravindra as Inspector Suresh
- Sanjay Raichur as Ratnakar
- Vinay Varma as Banerjee, Sameera's lawyer
- Syed Irfan Ahmed as Rahul Maha, Sameera's husband
- Shwetha Verma as Vaishnavi Krishna
- Pammi Sai as Constable Reddy
- Sasidhar as (Real)Sub inspector Vikram Vasudev

== Production ==
The film was shot in Hyderabad and Kodaikanal. The last schedule of the film was wrapped up in July 2019.

== Soundtrack ==
Evaru

Soundtrack album by Sricharan Pakala
- Released: 20 August 2019
- Recorded: 2019
- Studio: Studio 102
- Length: 5:04
- Label: Aditya Music

Sricharan Pakala chronology
Idam Jagath (2018)	Evaru (2019)	Chanakya (2019)

The music of the film is composed by Sricharan Pakala while lyrics are by V N V Ramesh Kumar.

Track listing
No.	Title	Lyrics	Music	Singer(s)	Length
1.	"Ennenno"	V N V Ramesh Kumar	Sricharan Pakala	Chinmayi Sripada	2:52
2.	"Edhemaina"	V N V Ramesh Kumar	Sricharan Pakala	Poojan Kohli	2:12

== Reception ==
=== Critical reception ===
Firstpost gave 3.5 out of 5 stars stating "This is a film which pushes you to keep up with the pace of the action, drama, and the conversations between the lead characters, because the devil lies in the details.".

The Times of India gave 3 out of 5 stars stating "Evaru is gripping to the core and has some decent technical values, but the film does lets itself down at times with gaps in the narration".

=== Home media ===
The film's digital distribution rights were bought by Amazon Prime Video.

== See also ==
- Badla, Hindi-language adaptation of The Invisible Guest
