= U the End A =

U The End A
- Directed by: Nagendra B Karanik
- Written by: Nagendra B Karanik
- Produced by: Parvathi B Karanik
- Starring: Nagendra Karanik, Kumuda, Ananth Nag, Sadhu Kokila, Raju Talikote, Vijay Kumar
- Cinematography: Manohar Joshi
- Edited by: Akshay P Rao
- Music by: Manu Sri
- Production company: Shri Thrayambike Devi Talkies
- Release dates: 19 February 2016 (Karnataka, India)
- Running time: 1hr 50 min
- Country: India
- Language: Kannada

U The End A is a 2016 Kannada psychological love thriller film written and directed by Nagendra Karanik, produced under the banner Shri Thrayambike Devi Talkies, starring Anant Nag, Nagendra Karanik and Kumuda in the lead roles. Sadhu Kokila and Raju Talikote feature in supporting roles.

== Plot ==
This movie is a psychological love thriller. The main lead of the movie, Rohan (Nagendra Karanik) is a young man with powerful political background, experiences an Astral Travel towards his future and see that a girl is going to betray him end his life. His struggle to find answers to all the questions he faces in his Astral Travel forms the crux of the story.

== Cast ==
- Nagendra Karanik as Rohan
- Kumuda as Madhu/Aishwarya
- Anant Nag
- Sadhu Kokila
- Raju Talikote
- Vijaykumar
- Yashaswini Karanik

== Production ==
The shooting of the movie commenced in February 2013 and finished in July 2014. The movie has been shot in Bangalore and some locations of Goa and Manali.

== Soundtrack ==
The music of the movie has been composed by Manu Sri and the background score by Bharath B. J.

U The End A

Soundtrack album
- Genre: Feature film soundtrack
- Label: Lahari Music

Track Listing
No	Title	Lyrics	Singer(s)	Length
1	"Yaare Neenu Nannola"	Manusri	Manusri	3:50
2	"Neenene Nanna Radhe"	Manusri	Karthik, Shruthi V.S.	4:43
3	"Tirboki Naanu Tirboki"	Manusri	Kunal Ganjawala	4:19
4	"First Time Heartalli"	Manusri	Tippu	3:56
5	"Baa Saniha"	Manusri	Inchara Rao	5:14
6	"Neenene Nanna Radhe" (Unplugged)	Manusri	Manusri, Shruthi V. S.	4:57
7	"Maaye Ee Jagavu"	Manusri	Kunal Ganjawala	2:55
