= Yadha Yadha Hi =

- Directed by: Ashok Teja
- Based on: Evaru by Venkat Ramji
- Produced by: Rajesh Agarwal
- Starring: Diganth Manchale; Vasishta N. Simha; Hariprriya
- Cinematography: Yogi
- Edited by: Srikanth
- Music by: Sricharan Pakala; Harshavardhan Raj
- Production companies: Guys & Dolls Creations
- Distributed by: Shalini Arts
- Release date: 2 June 2023
- Running time: 131 minutes
- Country: India
- Language: Kannada

Yadha Yadha Hi is a 2023 Indian Kannada-language crime thriller film directed by Ashok Teja. The film was produced by Rajesh Agarwal under Guys & Dolls Creations. The film stars Diganth Manchale, Vasishta N. Simha and Hariprriya, in the lead roles, alongside Avinash, Swathi, and Manju Pavagada in supporting roles. The music was composed by Sricharan Pakalanand Harshavardhan Raj. The film is a remake of 2019 Telugu film Evaru, directed by Venkat Ramji, which itself was loosely based on the 2016 Spanish film The Invisible Guest (2016) by Oriol Paulo.

Yadha Yadha Hi was released on 2 June 2023, to mixed to positive reviews from critics. However, it was a commercial failure at the box office.

== Plot ==
Priyanka Shetty (Hariprriya), the wife of wealthy businessman Rahul, shoots police officer Aditya Varma (Vasishta Simha) to death at a resort house in Munnar and is quickly arrested. The case attracts wide media attention. During police interrogation — and later in a press conference after she is granted bail — Priyanka claims that Aditya raped her before the shooting and insists that she did nothing wrong by killing her rapist.

Using her wealth and connections, Priyanka bribes a supposedly corrupt police officer, Ashoke Teja (Diganth), to obtain insider information about the investigation, hoping to better prepare for her court case. Ashoke soon arrives at her house in Bangalore to speak with her.

Priyanka claims that she first met Aditya two years ago at a function. However, Ashoke quickly debunks this with his inside knowledge. He presents documents proving that Priyanka and Aditya had known each other since college — and reveals another shocking detail: Rahul, her husband, is actually gay. Ashoke warns her that the prosecution is aware of this and will likely argue that her marriage is one of convenience, while her true lover was Aditya — which would undermine her rape accusation.

Cornered, Priyanka confesses more. She admits she and Aditya were lovers in college, but she broke up with him due to his anger issues and possessiveness. Years later, they reconnected and began meeting frequently. She considered him just a friend, but Aditya still desired her — and eventually raped her at the resort house.

At this point, Ashoke receives a phone call about a missing-person case from a year earlier. Curious, Priyanka asks what it is about, and Ashoke explains:

A year ago, a young man named Adarsh and his mother filed a missing-person report for his father, Avinash Bhat. Ashoke was the officer handling the case. Investigation revealed that Avinash had received several large money transfers before he disappeared. Each time, the transaction was followed by a call from the same phone number — which turned out to belong to a Bangalore police officer named Aditya Varma.

Adarsh and Ashoke went to Bangalore to confront Aditya, but he drove them away and even threatened to kill Adarsh if he kept investigating. They also saw Priyanka there — whom Adarsh recognized as a woman he and his mother had met earlier, though she used a different name. They concluded that Aditya and Priyanka were involved in Avinash's disappearance.

Ashoke now accuses Priyanka of murdering Avinash, showing her a phone he recovered from the same resort house where Avinash vanished — her lost phone.

Priyanka, again cornered, confesses more: She admits she had been having an affair with Aditya. On their way to the resort house, their car got into a minor collision with another vehicle — driven by Avinash. This led to a confrontation. Later, Avinash arrived at the resort house, where he found Aditya and Priyanka inside. The house turned out to belong to Avinash, and Aditya was trying to buy it. Recognizing them from the earlier argument, Avinash refused to sell and threatened to expose their affair, knowing Priyanka was married. Despite Priyanka's pleas, Aditya killed Avinash.

Sometime later, Priyanka received a blackmail call from someone claiming to know about Avinash's death. The caller demanded a large amount of money to be left at the same resort house. Priyanka complied, only to find Aditya there as well — also apparently blackmailed by the same person. She begged him to surrender, but he refused. After they had sex, Aditya drew a gun to kill her so she wouldn't expose him. Priyanka fought back and shot him instead.

Ashoke doubts her story and presses her for the truth. Priyanka insists she's telling it. Ashoke then reveals the final twist: the mysterious blackmailer was himself. He was on the phone with Aditya during the confrontation and overheard everything — including that Priyanka was the one who killed Avinash, and that Aditya had been ready to surrender. To protect herself, she killed Aditya too.

Furious, Priyanka realizes Ashoke has been deceiving her. But he insists he is just a corrupt police that only works for money. He urges her to tell the truth so he can help her in court, asking where she hid Avinash's body. When she reveals the location, Ashoke pulls out a hidden spy camera that has recorded their entire conversation. Priyanka furiously threatens to kill him, police officers, who have been waiting outside, break in and arrest her.

It's then revealed that the “corrupt officer” Priyanka had been talking to was not Ashoke Teja at all — but Adarsh, Avinash's son, posing as him. The real Ashoke Teja, the police officer, had been outside, leading the operation to extract her confession.

== Cast ==
- Diganth Manchale as Ashok Teja alias Adarsh Bhat
- Vasishta Simha as ACP Aditya Varma
- Hariprriya as Priyanka Shetty
- Avinash as Avinash Bhat
- Manju Pavgada
- Swathi as Avinash Bhat's wife and Adarsh Bhat's mother

== Production ==
The film was initially announced with Diganth as the lead. Later Hariprriya was on board to play the lead actress, marking her first collaboration with Diganth. The other male lead was earlier offered to Prabhu Mundkur but the actor walked away citing dates issues. Later Vasishta Simha was on board to play the other lead character replacing Prabhu. The film was shot majorly in Hyderabad, Munnar and partially in Bengaluru.

The first song of the film was launched by Sudeep which marks singing debut for Hriprriya.

== Soundtrack ==
Yadha Yadha Hi

Soundtrack album by Sricharan Pakala
- Released: 2 June 2023
- Recorded: 2023
- Length: 7:42
- Language: Kannada
- Label: T-Series

Sricharan Pakala chronology
Spy (2023)	Yadha Yadha Hi (2023)	The Great Indian Suicide (2023)

The music of the film is composed by Sricharan Pakala while lyrics are by Nagarjun Sharma.

Track listing
No.	Title	Lyrics	Music	Singer(s)	Length
1.	"Yadha Yadha Hi Title Song"	Nagarjun Sharma	Sricharan Pakala	Vasishta N. Simha, Hariprriya	2:14
2.	"Thanu Mana"	Nagarjun Sharma	Sricharan Pakala	Yamini Ghantasala	2:37
3.	"Yaaro Yaaro"	Nagarjun Sharma	Sricharan Pakala	Ravi Prakash Chodimalla, Sangeetha Rajeev	2:53
Total length:					7:42

== Release ==
Yadha Yadha Hi was released on 2 June 2023.

=== Critical response ===
Vinay Lokesh of The Times of India gave 3 out of 5 stars and wrote "The plot which thrives on narration pattern and nail biting scenes hits the nail in the climax. The project which is the official remake of Evaru stays true to the core.Full marks to Hariprriya for pulling off Priyanka's character which has negative shades. Diganth perfectly steps into the shoes of maverick cop Adithya. Vasista gives his best. Yadha Yadha Hi has all the elements which will make a perfect weekend watch".

Shraddha of The New Indian Express gave 3 out of 5 stars and wrote "Credit must be given to the original writer of the Spanish film, who etched a conversational crime story. Since Yadha Yadha Hi is an adaptation, it does have a ready reckoner in place, which the filmmaker could have made good use of. However, director Ashok Teja stumbles when it comes to ensuring a crisp screenplay. The plotline is marred by excessive twists and turns, occasionally leaving the audience confused. For instance, the film introduces Adarsh Bhat as a character who seeks Ashok Teja’s assistance in investigating the disappearance of his father, only to later reveal that Ashok Teja himself is, in fact, Adarsh Bhat. Furthermore, the film suffers from its duration, as it could have benefited from some trimming to maintain a more engaging experience.When it comes to performances, Hariprriya’s acting, which sees a blend of determination, vulnerability, and cunning, command attention. As a heroine, she has a substantial full-length role that showcases her talent after a considerable time. Her chemistry with Vasishta is palpable, and their on-screen dynamic works seamlessly. Vasishta Simha in the limited space he is given, puts forth his best effort to display his acting prowess. Diganth, on the other hand, ventures into uncharted territory, portraying a character that embodies both positive and negative shades. His convincing portrayal and ample screen time allow him to make the most of this opportunity, eliciting both appreciation and laughter. In particular, his performance during scenes where he portrays a cancer patient deserves special recognition. Yogi’s cinematography captures the mood of the thriller. He along with Sricharan Pakala’s and Harsha Vardhan Raj’s musical score enhances its atmospheric appeal. For those, who have not seen the Hollywood film, The Invisible Guest, the Hindi version, Badla, or the Telugu hit, Evaru, the Kannada version will be an engaging one-time watch."
