= Raju Talikote =

Indian actor and comedian (1962/1963–2025)

- Born: Rajesaba Maktumasab Yankanchi; 1962 or 1963
- Died: 13 October 2025 (aged 62); Udupi, Karnataka, India
- Occupations: Actor; comedian
- Years active: 1998–2025

Rajesaba Maktumasab Yankanchi (1962 or 1963 – 13 October 2025), also known as Raju Talikote, was an Indian actor and comedian. He was one of the participants in season 7 of the reality television series Bigg Boss Kannada. Talikote died from a heart attack on 13 October 2025, at the age of 62.

== Selected filmography ==
- Hendati Endare Hendati (1998)
- Punjabi House (2002)
- Manasaare (2009)
- Pancharangi (2010)
- Jackie (2010)
- Sugreeva (2010)
- Appu and Pappu (2010)
- Mallikarjuna (2011)
- Lifeu Ishtene (2011)
- Rajadhani (2011)
- Alemari (2012)
- Charminar (2013)
- Myna (2013)
- Topiwala (2013)
- Veera (2013)
- Patharagitthi (2015)
- U The End A (2016)
- 100 (2021)
- Sreemanta (2023)

== See also ==
- List of people from Karnataka
- Kannada cinema
- List of Indian film actresses
- Cinema of India
