= Magane Mahisha =

2022 Indian Tulu-language film

- Directed by: Veerendra Shetty Kavoor
- Written by: Veerendra Shetty Kavoor
- Produced by: Veerendra Shetty Kavoor
- Starring: Jyothi Rai; Devadas Kapikad; Naveen D Padil; Bhojaraj Vamanjoor; Aravind Bolar
- Cinematography: Mahi B Reddy
- Music by: Mano Murthy
- Release date: 29 April 2022
- Running time: 146 minutes
- Country: India
- Language: Tulu

Magane Mahisha is a 2022 Indian Tulu language film written and directed by Veerendra Shetty Kavoor. The cast of the movie includes Devadas Kapikad, Jyothi Rai, Naveen D Padil, Arvind Bolar and Bhojaraj Vamnjoor in lead roles. Magane Mahisha was produced by Veerendra Shetty Kavoor under the banner of Veeru Talkies. The movie was released on 29 April 2022. The music of the film was released worldwide by Movietone Digital Entertainment Pvt Ltd under its flagship music label “OnClick Music” in Tulu & Kannada language both.

== Plot ==
The film is about the three Convicted thieves, Shambhu, Shankara and Razak, turn over a new leaf after being released from jail and seek to become good Samartians. An unforeseen incident puts them in a precarious life or death situation between dangerous gangsters and the police.

== Cast ==
- Devdas Kapikad
- Naveen D Padil
- Bhojaraj Vamanjoor
- Arvind Bolar
- Jyothi Rai
- Shivadhwaj
- Shobharaj Pahoor
- Shiva Alike

== Soundtrack ==
The soundtracks of the film were composed by Mano Murthy and the promotional song 'Magane Magane' was composed by Loy Valentine Saldanha.The songs of the film in both versions Kannada & Tulu were worldwide released by Movietone Digital Entertainment Pvt Ltd under its flagship label “OnClick Music” .

No.	Title	Lyrics	Singer(s)	Length
1.	"Chandana Siri"	Veerendra Shetty	Anuradha Bhat	4:18
2.	"Kanana Niajana "	Vijaykumar Kodailbail	Prashanth Kankanady, Akanksha Badami	6:59
3.	"Olla Olla Mahishasa"	Rakshan Madoor	Rakshan Madoor	4:04
4.	"Ayagiri Nandini"	Devotional	B Jayashree	3:32
5.	"Magane Magene"	Rakshan Madoor	Rakshan Madoor, Sandesh Neermarga	4:15
