= Badla (2019 film) =

2019 film directed by Sujoy Ghosh

- Theatrical release poster
- Directed by: Sujoy Ghosh
- Screenplay by: Sujoy Ghosh
- Dialogue by: Raja Vasant
- Story by: Oriol Paulo
- Based on: The Invisible Guest by Oriol Paulo
- Produced by: Gauri Khan; Sunir Khetarpal; Akshai Puri
- Starring: Amitabh Bachchan; Taapsee Pannu; Amrita Singh
- Cinematography: Avik Mukhopadhyay
- Edited by: Monisha R. Baldawa
- Music by: Songs: Amaal Mallik; Anupam Roy; Clinton Cerejo; Background Score: Clinton Cerejo
- Production companies: Red Chillies Entertainment; Azure Entertainment
- Distributed by: AA Films
- Release date: 8 March 2019
- Running time: 118 minutes
- Countries: India; United Kingdom
- Language: Hindi
- Budget: ₹100 million
- Box office: est. ₹1.385 billion

Badla (transl. Revenge) is a 2019 Indian Hindi-language mystery thriller drama film written and directed by Sujoy Ghosh. The film stars Amitabh Bachchan, Taapsee Pannu and Amrita Singh. It is produced by Universal Entertainment, Red Chillies Entertainment and Azure Entertainment and is a remake of the 2016 Spanish film The Invisible Guest. The story follows an interview between a lawyer and a businesswoman, in which the latter insists that she is being wrongfully framed for the murder of her lover.

Badla released on 8 March 2019, grossing over ₹1.38 billion (US$14 million) worldwide against a production budget of ₹370 million (US$3.8 million), thus emerging as a major commercial success. It received widespread critical acclaim, with high praise directed towards its adapted story and screenplay, dialogues, visuals, cinematography, and cast performances.

At the 65th Filmfare Awards, Badla received 4 nominations, including Best Supporting Actress for Amrita Singh.

== Plot ==
Naina Sethi is a sharp, ambitious young businesswoman in London with a seemingly perfect life, until her world is turned upside down when she's arrested for the murder of her lover, Arjun. Her lawyer, Jimmy Punjabi, hires renowned defence attorney Badal Gupta to help, and over the course of one evening, they work to uncover what really happened. Badal informs Naina that a witness will testify against her. Naina explains that she and Arjun were being blackmailed over their affair. They were summoned to a hotel, where she was attacked and later woke up to find Arjun dead, along with the money they had brought for the blackmailer. Although arrested, she's currently out on bail. The police found no evidence of anyone else being in the room or breaking in.

Badal suspects Naina is withholding the truth and presses her about the disappearance of a young man near the hotel. Naina then admits that a few months earlier, she and Arjun had gone to a cabin in the woods. On their way back, she accidentally hit another car, killing a young man named Sunny. Arjun convinced her not to report it (since Sunny had been texting while driving and not wearing his seat belt), and they covered up the accident. They put Sunny's body in his car's trunk, which Naina later dumped in a swamp. As Arjun waits for Naina in her car, an elderly couple Rani and Nirmal pass by the car. Nirmal offered to fix the car at their home, while Rani invited Arjun in to have tea. As he talks to Rani, he learns from a picture of Sunny in their house, that he is their son. Rani grew suspicious when she heard her son's phone ring in Arjun's pocket, as he had forgotten to get rid of it. Moreover, it worsened when Arjun is seen adjusting the driver's seat after the car was repaired. Arjun picks up Naina, details his encounter with the couple and Naina dumps in the car in a dump yard, reporting it to be stolen. The two part ways afterward.

Naina later saw news reports accusing Sunny of embezzling money from the bank where he worked before disappearing. She realised that Arjun had taken Sunny's wallet and used his wife's credentials to hack the bank and frame Sunny. Through the number plate, Rani identified Naina's car at the time of her son's disappearance, but Jimmy falsified an alibi. Although the police accepted it, Rani wasn't convinced. She confronted Naina at an event where she was awarded the ‘Businesswoman of the Year’. Rani begs her to reveal Sunny's whereabouts, but Naina kept up her lie. Months later, she and Arjun were contacted by a blackmailer, leading to the events that got her arrested.

Badal theorises that Rani killed Arjun, with Nirmal's help since he worked at the hotel. Naina admits she saw Rani in the room but had lied to test Badal's competence. Badal then reveals that there was no witness—he had made it up to get the truth from her. In order to place the blame on Arjun, he convinces Naina to reveal the location of the swamp where Sunny's car was dumped; a belonging that was specific to Arjun would be placed to make Naina appear innocent in the act. Now trusting him, Naina confesses a dark secret: Sunny had still been alive in the trunk when she dumped the car, but she chose to let him die to avoid getting caught. Shocked by her actions, Badal suggests that Naina, not Arjun, orchestrated the cover-up and framed Sunny. He speculates that Arjun, overcome with guilt, went to the hotel to confess to Rani and Nirmal, and Naina killed him to keep the truth hidden. Naina denies this, insisting that her earlier story is the real one.

Badal refuses to defend Naina any further unless she admits to killing Arjun, which Naina does. Badal agrees to continue helping her, but steps outside to call his wife about his overtime work on this case. Meanwhile, Naina receives a call from Jimmy and notices that Badal's pen is disrupting the signal. Realizing something is wrong, she discovers that the man posing as Badal was an imposter when the real Badal Gupta arrives at her door. Horrified, Naina disassembles the pen, revealing a hidden voice recorder with her confessions. She looks out the window and sees the imposter and Rani in the apartment across from hers. The man posing as Badal removes his disguise, revealing himself to be Nirmal. With solid evidence backing her up this time, Rani then calls the police to have Naina arrested.

== Cast ==
- Amitabh Bachchan as Advocate Badal Gupta (Fake)
- Taapsee Pannu as Naina Sethi
- Amrita Singh as Rani Kaur Toor
- Tony Luke as Arjun Joseph aka "Arjun" (Naina's secret lover)
- Manav Kaul as Jimmy Punjabi (Naina's lawyer and college friend)
- Tanveer Ghani as Nirmal "Nimbi" Singh Toor (Rani's husband, Sunny's father who imposed as Badal Gupta)
- Denzil Smith as Detective Sodhi
- Antonio Aakeel as Sunny Singh Toor (Rani and Nimbi's son)
- Shome Makhija as Sunil Sethi (Naina's husband)
- Elena Fernandes as Glen Mohr Hotel receptionist

== Filming ==
The principal photography of the film began on 14 June 2018 in Glasgow, Scotland.

== Marketing and release ==
On 11 February 2019, Shah Rukh Khan, whose production house Red Chillies Entertainment is producing the film, tweeted two first look posters of the film, one with Bachchan's character and another with Pannu's. The film was released on International Women's Day, 8 March 2019 and is available online on Netflix. The film was certified by British Board of Film Classification with runtime of 118 minutes.

=== Promotional videos ===
Three unplugged innovative promotional videos which involved a conversation between Shah Rukh Khan and Amitabh Bachchan were launched on 3 March 2019, 6 March 2019 and 9 March 2019 respectively, which also featured Taapsee Pannu, to promote the film.

=== Dialogue promos ===
"Main Sach Hi Toh Bol Rahi Hoon" was published on 25 February 2019, "Homework" on 28 February 2019, "Sab Ka Sach Alag Alag Hota Hai" on 1 March 2019 and "Mere Paas Teen Sawaal Hain" was published on 7 March 2019 on YouTube, featuring Amitabh Bachchan and Taapsee Pannu respectively.

== Soundtrack ==
Badla

Soundtrack album by Amaal Mallik, Anupam Roy and Clinton Cerejo
- Released: 1 March 2019
- Recorded: 2018
- Genre: Feature Film Soundtrack
- Length: 18:05
- Language: Hindi
- Label: Zee Music Company
External audio
- Official Audio Jukebox on YouTube

Amaal Mallik chronology
Sonu Ke Titu Ki Sweety (2018)	Badla (2019)	De De Pyaar De (2019)

Anupam Roy chronology
October (2018)	Badla (2019)	Malang (2020)

Clinton Cerejo chronology
Kahaani 2: Durga Rani Singh (2016)	Badla (2019)

The music of the film is composed by Amaal Mallik, Anupam Roy and Clinton Cerejo while the lyrics are penned by Kumaar, A. M. Turaz, Siddhant Kaushal, Manoj Yadav, Anupam Roy and Jizzy. Amitabh Bachchan, inspired by Ranveer Singh's Gully Boy, rapped the song "Aukaat".

Track listing
No.	Title	Lyrics	Music	Singer(s)	Length
1.	"Kyun Rabba"	Kumaar	Amaal Mallik	Armaan Malik	4:52
2.	"Aukaat"	Siddhant Kaushal, Jizzy	Clinton Cerejo	Amitabh Bachchan, Amit Mishra, Clinton Cerejo; Rap: Jizzy	2:32
3.	"Tum Na Aaye"	A. M. Turaz	Amaal Mallik	K. K.	2:59
4.	"Badla"	Manoj Yadav, Anupam Roy	Anupam Roy	Anupam Roy	4:08
5.	"Kyun Rabba" (Acoustic)	Kumaar	Amaal Mallik	Armaan Malik	3:34
Total length:					18:05

== Reception ==
=== Critical response ===
On the review aggregator website Rotten Tomatoes, 63% of 16 critics' reviews are positive, with an average rating of 6/10.

Gaurang Chauhan reviewing for Times Now gave the film 3.5/5 stars and wrote, "Sujoy Ghosh delivers yet another interesting, enticing and an edge-of-the-seat mystery thriller." Rachit Gupta of The Times of India also rated the film with 3.5/5 stars saying, "The predictability of the screenplay dampens the thrills occasionally, also the climactic twist requires a healthy dose of suspense of disbelief. But, even the seasoned genre faithfuls will agree that 'Badla' offers a creative and thrilling end to a captivating mystery." Cinema200 too gave it 3.5/5 stars, praising the direction and climax. Taran Adarsh gave the film 3.5 stars out of 5 and found the film and its star-cast, captivating and brilliant.

Saibal Chatterjee of NDTV gave 3/5 stars and opined, "In a role that is right up his alley, Amitabh Bachchan is classy. Taapsee Pannu is right on the button as a cornered woman on the brink of a catastrophe, as is Amrita Singh as an aggrieved mother who has nothing to lose." Anupama Chopra of Film Companion gives 2.5/5 stars and remarked, Badla remains watchable until the end but it doesn't become essential viewing."

=== Box office ===
In its opening weekend, Badla collected ₹273.8 million from domestic market. The film had a worldwide gross collection of ₹138.49 crore consisting of domestic gross of ₹103.88 crore and overseas gross of ₹34.61 crore.

== Accolades ==
Award	Ceremony date	Category	Recipient(s) and nominee(s)	Result
Filmfare Awards	15 February 2020	Best Supporting Actress	Amrita Singh	Nominated
Filmfare Awards	15 February 2020	Best Background Score	Clinton Cerejo	Nominated
Filmfare Awards	15 February 2020	Best Editing	Monisha R Baldawa	Nominated
Filmfare Awards	15 February 2020	Best Sound Design	Anirban Sengupta	Nominated
IIFA Awards	24 November 2021	Best Director	Sujoy Ghosh	Nominated
IIFA Awards	24 November 2021	Best Actress	Taapsee Pannu	Nominated
IIFA Awards	24 November 2021	Best Supporting Actress	Amrita Singh	Nominated
Screen Awards	8 December 2019	Best Actress (Critics)	Taapsee Pannu	Nominated
Screen Awards	8 December 2019	Best Supporting Actress	Amrita Singh	Nominated
Zee Cine Awards	28 March 2020	Best Actress (Critics)	Taapsee Pannu	Won

== See also ==
- The Invisible Guest
- Evaru
