= Filmfare Award for Best Male Playback Singer – Kannada =

Indian annual film award

The Filmfare Best Male Playback Award – Kannada is given by the Filmfare magazine as part of its annual Filmfare Awards for Kannada films.

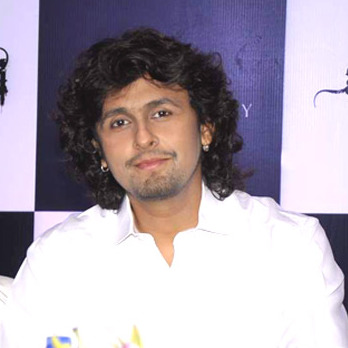
Sonu Nigam, Chetan Sosca and Vijay Prakash hold the record for maximum wins in this category, with 2 each.

== Superlatives ==
Superlative	Artist	Record
Most Awards	Sonu Nigam	2
Most Awards	Vijay Prakash	2
Most Awards	Chetan Sosca	2

== Winners ==
Year	Singer	Film	Song	Ref.
2024	Jaskaran Singh	Krishnam Pranaya Sakhi	"Dwapara"	
2023	Kapil Kapilan	Sapta Saagaradaache Ello: Side A	"Sapta Saagaradaache Ello Title Track"	
2022	Sai Vignesh	Kantara	"Varaha Roopam"	
2020–21	Raghu Dixit	Ninna Sanihake	"Maley Maley Maleye"	
2019	AWARDS FUNCTION WAS SUSPENDED DUE TO COVID-19 PANDEMIC			
2018	Sanjith Hegde	Naduve Antaravirali	"Shakunthale"	
2017	Armaan Malik	Chakravarthy	"Ondu Malebillu"	
2016	Vijay Prakash	Kirik Party	"Belageddu Yara Mukhava"	
2015	Santhosh Venky	Rhaatee	"Raja Raniyanthe"	
2014	Vijay Prakash	Ulidavaru Kandanthe	"Gatiya Ilidu"	
2013	Poornachandra Tejaswi	Lucia	"Thinbedakammi"	
2012	Avinash Chebbi	Sidlingu	"Ellello Oduva Manase"	
2011	Chetan Sosca	Lifu Ishtene	"Yaarige Healona"	
2010	S. P. Balasubrahmanyam	Aptharakshaka	"Gharane"	
2009	Chetan Sosca	Ambari	"Yaare Nee Devatheya"	
2008	Sonu Nigam	Mussanjemaatu	"Enaagali Munde Saagali"	
2007	Sonu Nigam	Milana	"Ninnindale"	
2006	Hemanth Kumar	Kallarali Hoovagi	"Kallarali Hoovaagi"	
