= Diganth Manchale =

Indian film actor (born 1983)

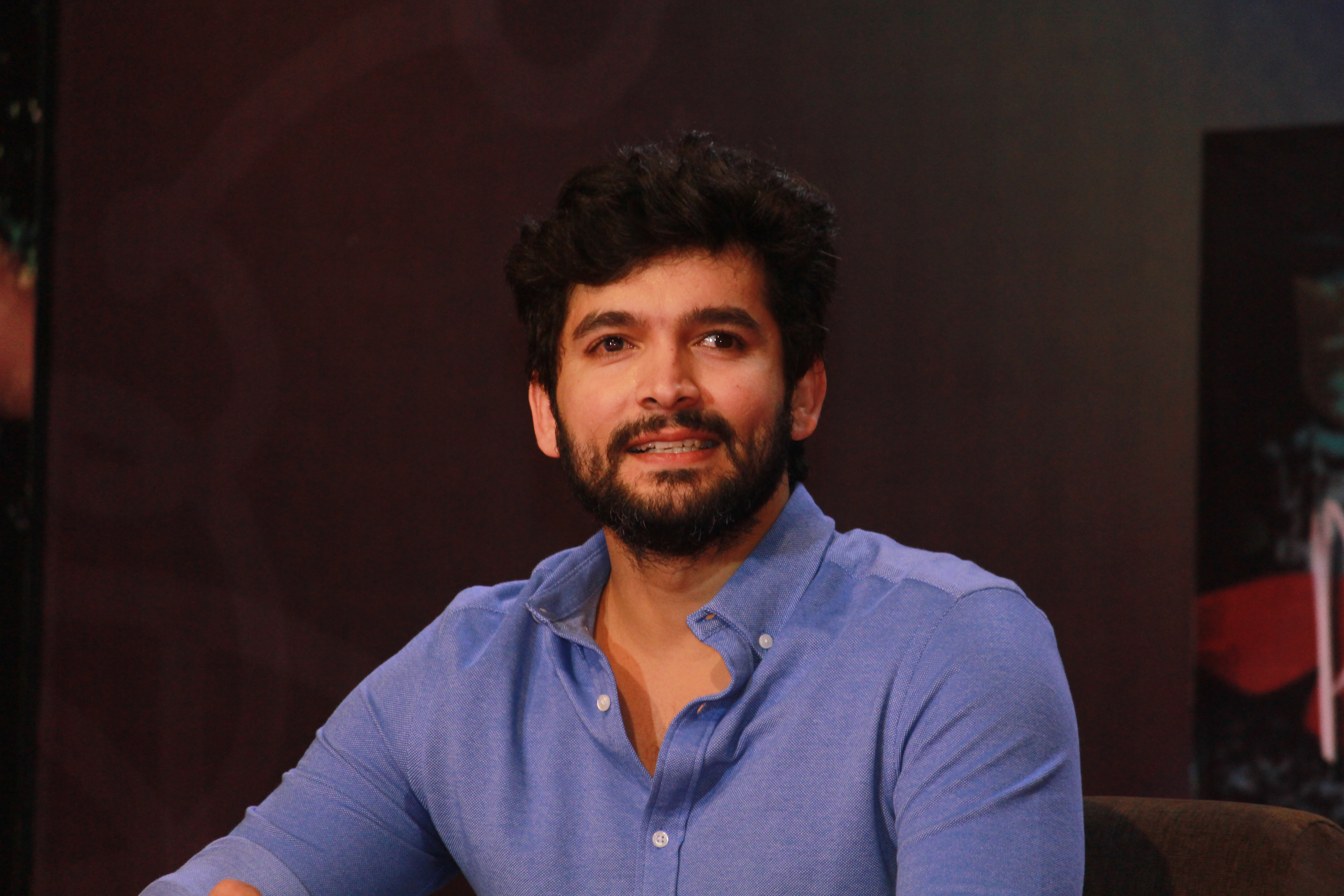
- Diganth in 2017
- Born: Diganth Manchale; 28 December 1983 (age 42); Thirthahalli taluk, Shivamogga, Karnataka, India
- Education: Jain University, Bengaluru
- Occupations: Actor; model
- Years active: 2006–present
- Spouse: Aindrita Ray (m. 2018)

Diganth Manchale (born 28 December 1983), known professionally as Diganth, is an Indian actor who predominantly works in Kannada films. Diganth made his lead acting debut in Miss California (2006) and is best known for his performance in Gaalipata (2008). He is a recipient of two SIIMA Awards along with nominations for four Filmfare Awards South.

Diganth received the Filmfare Award for Best Actor – Kannada nomination for his portrayal in Manasaare (2009), Pancharangi (2010) and Katheyondu Shuruvagide (2018). He further established himself as a leading actor in Kannada cinema with commercial successes such as Lifeu Ishtene (2011), Parijatha (2012), Minchagi Nee Baralu (2015), Chowka (2017), Happy New Year (2017), Gaalipata 2 (2022), Thimayya & Thimayya (2022), Bachelor Party (2024) and Edagaiye Apaghatakke Karana (2025). He has his expansion to Telugu films with Maa Inti Bangaaram (2026), a box office success.

== Early life ==
Diganth Manchale was born in Sagara, Karnataka into a family of Kannada Havyaka Brahmins. He completed schooling in Seva Bharathi and pre-university in Tunga Mahavidyalaya, Thirthahalli. His father, Krishnamurthy, is a professor, and his mother is Mallika. Diganth has an elder brother, Akash Manchale. He completed his Graduate in B. Com from Sri Bhagawan Mahaveer Jain College, a part of Jain University in Bengaluru, and was a model before joining the Kannada film industry in 2006.

== Career ==
=== Early work, success and fluctuations (2006-2022) ===
Diganth made his lead debut in the film Miss California, but he gained fame for his supporting roles in Mungaru Male and Gaalipata. His career after 2010 includes successful projects such as Manasaare, Pancharangi, Lifeu Ishtene and Parijatha. All of these films brought him much popularity and stardom. He went on to play the lead in director Indrajith Lankesh's Dev Son of Mudde Gowda in 2012 which received mixed reactions.

Diganth made his Hindi film debut in Wedding Pullav that was released on 16 October 2015. In 2017, Diganth was part of Chowka, which was a blockbuster. In that same year, he acted in Happy New Year for which he was nominated for SIMA best supporting role. Under Pushkar films he acted in Katheyondu Shuruvagide, a romantic movie for which he was nominated for the SIIMA award for best actor. He also played a supporting role in Puneeth Rajkumar starrer Yuvarathnaa.

In 2021, he acted in the suspense thriller movie Huttu Habbada Shubhashayagalu. He played a village boy role in Kshamisi Nimma Khaatheyalli Hanavilla. He was also the part of Gaalipata 2 where his aghori character was praised.

=== Established actor (2023–present) ===
In the mystery thriller Yadha Yadha Hi (2023), Diganth played a corrupt police officer Ashok Teja investigating a murder case. The reviewer for Cinema Express felt that his character "embodies both positive and negative shades" and that his "convincing portrayal and ample screen time allow him to make the most of this opportunity, eliciting both appreciation and laughter." They added, "In particular, his performance during scenes where he portrays a cancer patient deserves special recognition." He made a cameo in Hostel Hudugaru Bekagiddare. In July 2023, it was reported that was signed for Rohith Padaki's gangster drama Uttarakaanda. In the comedy film, Bachelor Party, his first release of 2024, Diganth played a software engineer, whose personal life is miserable. He goes on a bachelor's party of a friend to Thailand and gets embroiled in a gang war. Film Companion wrote that "Diganth brings his signature, doe-eyed innocence to the character who is never happy in life... and even in anger, no one can take him seriously" and added that "... he does his best with the material." In another comedy, Marigold, he plays a habitual thief that hatches a plan along with his gang to steal gold biscuits from the police, who have acquired them using their ill-gotten money, in the backdrop of the 2016 demonetisation of banknotes. While Shashiprasad S. M. of Times Now News felt that the film helps Diganth "strike gold", A. Sharadhaa of Cinema Express felt that "Diganth... impeccably portrays Krishna's character, effortlessly switching between delivering punchy dialogues while maintaining the comic timing and exhibiting heroism."

In 2026, Diganth portrayed Anirudh, a doctor opposite Samantha Ruth Prabhu in Maa Inti Bangaaram. Yashaswini Sri appreciated his chemistry with Samantha and noted, "Diganth, playing the quiet support system to Suvarna’s storm, does solid work in a role that does not give him many lines to work with." The film was became a box office success and the highest-grossing female-led Telugu film, surpassing Rudhramadevi.

== Personal life ==
Diganth is sometimes called "Doodhpedha" by his fans, referencing his popular role by that name.

Diganth met actress Aindrita Ray on the sets of Manasaare in 2008, and they eventually started dating. After 10 years of courtship, Diganth and Ray got married on 12 December 2018, in a traditional Bengali wedding ceremony, at Nandi Hills, Karnataka.

== In the media ==
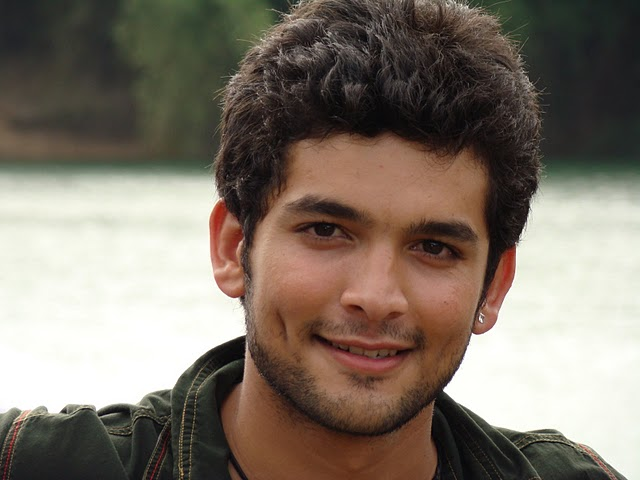
Diganth in 2011

Diganth was placed third in Rediff.com 's "Top 5 Kannada Actors" list of 2011, for his film Lifeu Ishtene. Diganth was placed 19th in 2018, 9th in 2019 and 6th in 2020 in the Bangalore Times' 30 Most Desirable Men list. In 2024, Diganth and Aindrita along with People for the Ethical Treatment of Animals, donated a mechanical elephant to a temple in Mysuru.

== Filmography ==
=== Films ===
- All films are in Kannada, unless otherwise noted.

Key
†	Denotes films that have not yet been released

Year	Film	Role	Notes	Ref.
2006	Mandya	Harsha		
2006	Miss California	Diganth		
2006	Kadala Mage	Arun	Tulu film	
2006	Mungaru Male	Gautham		
2007	SMS 6260	Roshan		
2007	Meera Madhava Raghava	Madhava		
2008	Gaalipata	Diganth		
2008	Vaana	Gautham	Telugu film	
2008	Mast Maja Maadi	Kamesh		
2008	Chilipili Hakkigalu			
2009	House Full	Diggu		
2009	Manasaare	Manohar		
2009	Male Bille	Akash		
2010	Swayamwara	Vijay		
2010	Antharathma		Guest appearance	
2010	Pancharangi	Bharath		
2010	Bisile	Vicky		
2011	Jolly Boy	Ganesh		
2011	Mr.Duplicate	Vikram		
2011	Lifeu Ishtene	Vishal		
2011	Putra	Krishna		
2011	Taare	Nesara		
2011	Kaanchaana	Venky		
2012	Parijatha	Bhaskar		
2012	Dev Son of Mudde Gowda	Dev		
2013	Barfi	Santosh		
2014	E Preeti	Vishal Murthy		
2015	Wedding Pullav	Aditya	Hindi film	
2015	Minchagi Nee Baralu	Jai		
2015	Sharpshooter	Jedara Kannappa "JK"	Also playback singer	
2016	Parapancha	Jokumara Seenu		
2016	Nagarahavu	Nagacharan		
2017	Chowka	Krishna Rao		
2017	Happy New Year	Harsha		
2018	Katheyondu Shuruvagide	Tarun Manchale		
2019	Fortuner	Phartha		
2019	Panchatantra	Himself	Guest appearance	
2021	Yuvarathnaa	Samarth Bharadwaj		
2021	Huttu Habbada Shubhashayagalu	Arjun		
2022	Kshamisi Nimma Khaatheyalli Hanavilla	Shankara		
2022	Gaalipata 2	Digi		
2022	Thimayya & Thimayya	Thimayya		
2023	Yadha Yadha Hi	Ashok Teja / Adarsh Bhatt		
2023	Hostel Hudugaru Bekagiddare	Bunty Gowda	Cameo appearance	
2024	Bachelor Party	Santhosh		
2024	Marigold	Krishna Nayak		
2024	The Judgement	Anil Kumar		
2024	Powder	Surya		
2024	Laughing Buddha	Vishwa		
2025	Edagaiye Apaghatakke Karana	Lohith		
2026	Maa Inti Bangaaram	Dr. Alluri Anirudh Raju	Telugu film	
2026	Daiji †	TBA	Completed	
2026	Rudra Kaala †	TBA	Filming	
2026	Uttarakaanda †	Mallige	Delayed	

=== Web series ===
Year	Film	Role	Notes	Ref.
2021	Ramyug	Rama	Hindi series on MX Player	

== Awards and nominations ==
Year	Award	Category	Film	Result	Ref.
2009	Filmfare Awards South	Best Supporting Actor – Kannada	Gaalipata	Nominated	
2010	Filmfare Awards South	Best Actor – Kannada	Manasaare	Nominated	
2011	Filmfare Awards South	Best Actor – Kannada	Pancharangi	Nominated	
2019	Filmfare Awards South	Best Actor – Kannada	Katheyondu Shuruvagide	Nominated	
2012	Suvarna Film Awards	Favorite Hero	Lifeu Ishtene	Nominated	
2013	South Indian International Movie Awards	Romantic Star of South Indian Cinema	—N/a	Won	
2018	South Indian International Movie Awards	Best Supporting Actor – Kannada	Happy New Year	Nominated	
2023	South Indian International Movie Awards	Best Supporting Actor – Kannada	Gaalipata 2	Won	
