= Chetan Sosca =

Indian playback singer

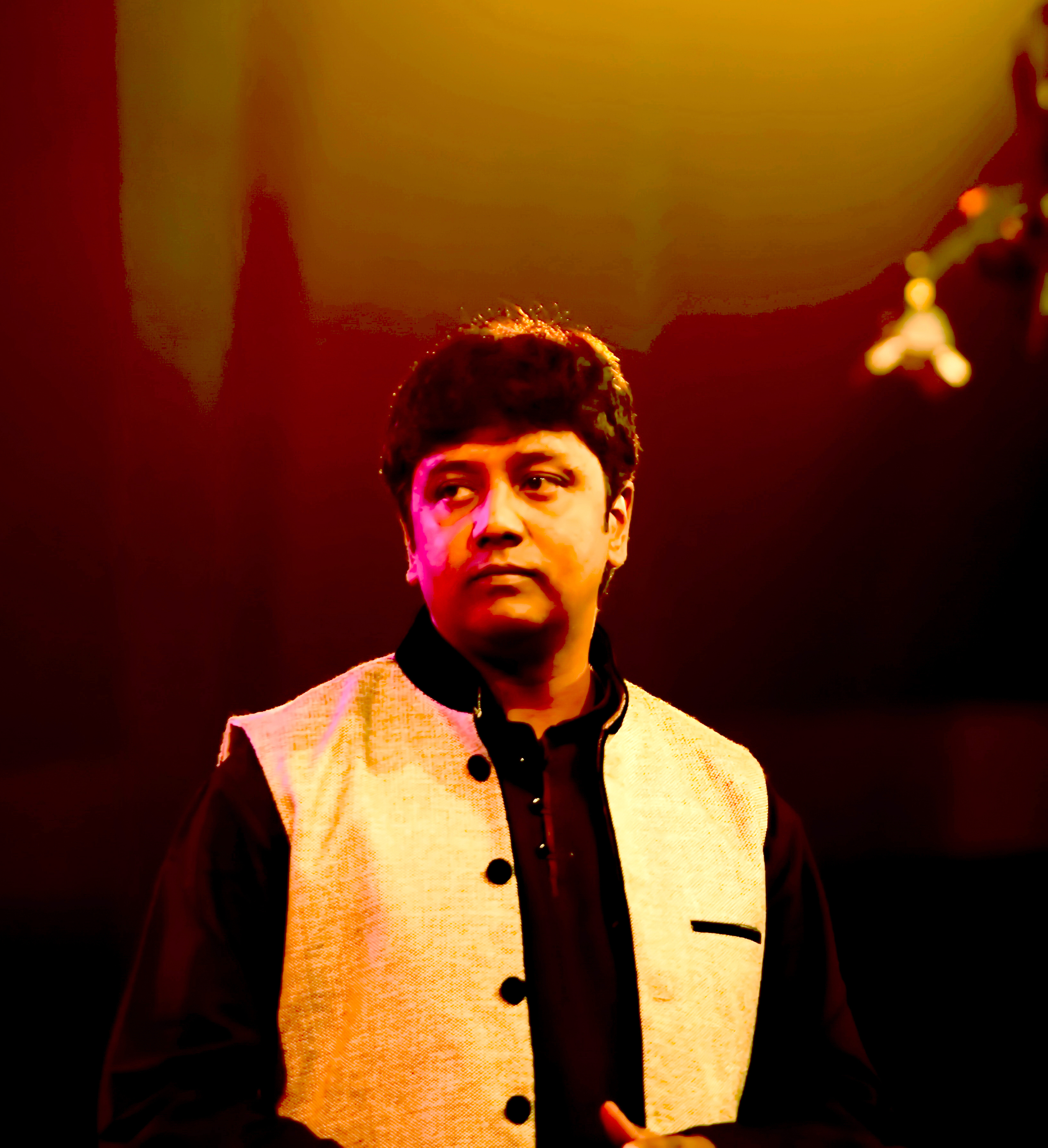
- Born: Bangalore, India, 26 October
- Occupation: Playback singer
- Spouse: Lavanya Chetan
- Children: 2
- Parent(s): Sosca Murthy (father), Jayalakshmi (mother)
- Awards: See awards section

Chetan L J popularly known as Chetan Sosca (Kannada: ಚೇತನ್ ಸಾಸ್ಕ) is an Indian playback singer and composer who has performed the music for many Kannada films.

== Career ==
Chetan’s film music debut was in the 2001 movie Kothigalu Saar Kothigalu. He has since sung over 1000 songs in Kannada movies. He has worked with Hamsalekha, Mano Murthy, Hari Krishna, V Manohar, R P Patnaik and Guru Kiran.

He composed the music for film 1/4 kg Preethi, DNA, UDAALA, 2ND HALF, KADAISI KADHAL KADHAI, and more.

He started his career in the year 2001 from kothigalu Saar kothigalu followed by tavarige baa tangi, nanjundi, title song for Nenapirali. He sang the pathos song "Janumada Gelathi" for the 2007 released film, Cheluvina Chittara. Following this song, he began to receive offers to sing in many films. As a music composer he has composed for films such as kaal kg Preeti and DNA.

In 2009 his song "Yaare Nee Devatheya" for the film Ambaari won awards including Filmfare South Indian Awards, Karnataka State Film Awards, Suvarna Film Awards, Mirchi Music Award south, South scope cine awards.

In the 2010 film Pancharangi he sang the title track and its sloka version. He also sang songs for films such as Krishnan Love Story, adduri. In 2011, his song "Yaarig Helona" from Lifeu Ishtene won awards like Filmfare South Indian Awards, Suvarna Film Awards, Mirchi Music Award south indian award and the Santhosham south indian award.

His song Pyarge Aagbittaite for the film Govindaya Namaha was successful and won Mirchi music award and was nominated for Filmfare award Recent works include "Cindrella" (Addhuri), "Be Be Be" (Rana), "Ninthu Nodalenu" (Shikari), and "Appu Hey Appu" (Dev Son of Mudde Gowda).

== Filmography ==
- Nenapirali
- Hudugaata
- Janumadaa gelathi (movie- cheluvina chittara)
- Yaare nee devatheya ( movie- Ambaari)
- Life ishtene (movie- Pancharangi)
- Yaarig helona namma problem (movie- lifu ishtene)
- Nenapirali (movie- vie- hudugaata)
- Sogase sogase – (movie – rishi)
- kotigalu saar kotigalu
- dumbee
- joot
- chelvi
- jogula
- tavarige baa thangi
- nanjundi
- gowdru
- Pandavaru
- My Autograph
- Madana
- Hudugaata
- Jambada Hudugi
- Cheluvina Chittara (janumada gelati)
- Pallakki (o priya...)
- Hettare Hennane Herabeku
- Moggina Manasu
- Malenada Mallige
- Taj Mahal
- Chaitrada Chandrama
- Navashakthi Vaibhava
- Ambari
- Aa
- Raavana
- Chickpete Sachagalu
- Chellidaru Sampigeya
- Eshtu Nagthi Nagu
- Hatrick Hodi Maga
- Cheluvina Chilipili
- Nirudyogi
- Jokaali
- Hrudayagala Vishya
- Minugu
- Varshadhaare
- Pancharangi
- Mr. Theertha
- Krishnan Love Story
- Lifeu Ishtene
- Mr. Duplicate
- Dandam Dashagunam
- Govindaya Namaha (pyar ke agbitayte)
- Addhuri (yarilla yarilla nenante yarila)
- Dev Son of Mudde Gowda
- Kiladi Kitty
- Hosa Prema Purana

== Awards ==
=== State Awards ===
- 2009 – Karnataka State Film Award for Best Male Playback Singer – "Yaare Nee Devatheya" (Ambari)

=== Filmfare Awards ===
- 2009 – Filmfare Award for Best Male Playback Singer – Kannada – "Yaare Nee Devatheya" (Ambaari)
- 2011 – Filmfare Award for Best Male Playback Singer – Kannada – "Yaarig Helona" (Lifeu Ishtene)
- 2013 – Filmfare Award Nomination for Best Male Playback Singer – Kannada – "pyarge aagbittaite" (Govindaya Namaha)

=== Suvarna Film Awards ===
- 2010 – Suvarna Film Award for Best Male Playback Singer – "Yaare Nee Devatheya" (Ambaari)
- 2011 – suvarna film award for Best Male Playback Singer – "Yaarig Helona" (Lifeu Ishtene)

=== Mirchi music awards ===
- 2009 – Mirchi Music Awards Best Male playback Singer – "Yaare Nee Devatheya" (Ambaari)
- 2009 – Mirchi Music Awards song of the year(critics) – "Yaare Nee Devatheya" (Ambaari)
- 2012 – Mirchi Music Awards Best Male playback Singer – "pyarge aagbittaite" (govindaya namaha)

=== Other Awards ===
- 2009 – South Scope Music Awards Best Male playback Singer – "Yaare Nee Devatheya" (Ambaari)
- 2006 – E TV Award for Best Singer – "Nenapirali" (Nenapirali)
- 2006 – Udaya Award for Best Singer- "Nenapirali" (Nenapirali)
- 1997 – Aryabhata award- Achievement in Ghazals
- 2011 – chitrarasikara sangha award – "lifu ishtene" ( Pancharangi)
- 2008 – chitrapremigala sangha award – "janumada gelathi" ( cheluvina chittara)
- 2011 – santhosham film award for Best Male Playback Singer – "Yaarig Helona" (Lifeu Ishtene)
