= Lifeu Ishtene =

- Theatrical release poster
- Directed by: Pawan Kumar
- Written by: Pawan Kumar
- Produced by: M. Manjunatha; Syed Salam; R. Upendra Shetty
- Starring: Diganth; Sindhu Lokanath; Samyukta Hornad
- Cinematography: Sugnaan
- Edited by: Sanath; Suresh
- Music by: Mano Murthy
- Production companies: Yograj Movies; KK Films
- Release date: 9 September 2011
- Running time: 130 minutes
- Country: India
- Language: Kannada
- Box office: ₹2 crores

Lifeu Ishtene (transl. This is all life is) is a 2011 Indian Kannada-language black comedy film written and directed by Pawan Kumar. It stars Diganth, Sindhu Lokanath and Samyukta Hornad in the lead roles. Sathish Ninasam, Achyuth Kumar and Veena Sundar feature in supporting roles. The plot revolves around the adult life of a carefree youngster, who falls in love easily with multiple women, and observes the consequences, "realizing the meaning of life" and that it comes a "full circle". The title of the film was taken from a track of the 2010 Kannada film Pancharangi.

The film score and soundtrack was composed by Mano Murthy, with lyrics for the tracks penned by Yogaraj Bhat, Jayant Kaikini and Pawan Kumar. The cinematography was done by Sugnaan, and was edited by Sanath and Suresh. The film was released on 9 September 2011 to critical acclaim. Following a nine-week run at theatres, it emerged as a commercial success, and was declared one of the best Kannada films of 2011. Having been nominated in three categories, Chethan Sosca won the award for Best Male Playback Singer at the Filmfare Awards. The movie was remade in Telugu by Thrigun.

== Plot ==
Vishal (Diganth) is a carefree youngster who is only serious about pursuing a career in music. In contrast, his friend Shivakumar "Shivu" (Sathish Ninasam) is serious about life and advises him to reform. But Vishal, whose parents allow him a lot of freedom, finds his own way to deal with hook ups. He falls in love with his collegemate, Nandini (Sindhu Loknath), who also falls in love with him. After a brief period of courtship, they decide to get married. Nandini wants Vishal to take up a job as it will help her discuss the marriage proposal with her father. He thinks she is the one for him, but only till the point where he has to choose between his music career and her, at which point they break up.

Vishal then meets a journalism aspirant, Rashmi (Samyukta Hornad), who films him, for her academic project. Nandini, initially reluctant, marries Chandan, as arranged by her father. Vishal has an awkward confrontation with her at the wedding. Rashmi, however, falls in love with him instantly and is ready to marry him. Having spent some time together, Vishal also falls in love with her, who eventually parts with her, on witnessing her being approached by an old pursuer, who he connects to, in context of Nandini.

Six months later, Shivu is diagnosed with cancer and is living his final days, and Vishal, working in Dubai, has been in touch with him. He returns to India to reconcile with Rashmi, now working as a television journalist, and finds her dating Suraj (Pawan Kumar). The film ends with Vishal's epilogue on how, in the context of love, life comes a full circle. One should not miss to watch the director's copy of alternate ending of the film on YouTube

== Cast ==
- Diganth as Vishal
- Sindhu Lokanath as Nandini
- Samyukta Hornad as Rashmi
- Sathish Ninasam as Shivakumar
- Achyuth Kumar as Vishal's father
- Veena Sundar as Vishal's mother
- Srinivas Prakash as Raghu
- Mimicry Dayanand as Pinky Lal
- Pawan Kumar as Suraj
- Raju Talikote as gatekeeper
- Chandan Kumar as Chandan
- P. D. Sathish Chandra
- Ramya Barna in a cameo appearance
- Gopalkrishna Deshpande as Barber
- Shille Manjunath as kid in Supermarket

== Production ==
Director Pawan Kumar had previously worked as an Assistant Director for Yograj Bhat's recent films like Manasaare and Pancharangi which were well received by critics. The title lifeu ishtene was taken from one of the most popular Kannada songs in 2010 from Pancharangi movie. Three weeks after the successful show of the film, Pawan Kumar said he is planning a sequel to the film which is tentatively titled Wifeu Ishtene which will "show how marriage is a bad idea for the character that Diganth played in Lifeu Ishtene."

== Soundtrack ==
Lifeu Ishtene

Soundtrack album by Mano Murthy
- Released: 21 July 2011
- Genre: Feature film soundtrack
- Length: 26:34
- Language: Kannada
- Label: Alpha Digitech

Mano Murthy chronology
Pancharangi (2010)	Lifeu Ishtene (2011)	Mr. Duplicate (2011)

Lifeu Ishtene music album, composed by Mano Murthy, was released on 21 July 2011. He also scored the background music for the film. The rights for the album was purchased by Ashwini Audio House. Jayant Kaikini, Yogaraj Bhat and Pawan Kumar penned lyrics for the tracks. The album consists of seven tracks. The album featured tracks from two debutantes, Rengith Raghav and Ankita Pai.

No.	Title	Lyrics	Singer(s)	Length
1.	"Yaarige Healona"	Yogaraj Bhat	Chetan Sosca	4:42
2.	"Ninna Gungalli"	Jayanth Kaikini	Sonu Nigam	4:20
3.	"Junior Devadasa"	Pawan Kumar	Hemanth Kumar, Ananya Bhagath	4:10
4.	"Maayavi Maayavi"	Yograj Bhat	Sonu Nigam, Shreya Ghoshal	4:42
5.	"Kanasina Hosaputa"	Jayanth Kaikini	Rajesh Krishnan	4:14
6.	"Hrudaya Jaaruthide"	Yograj Bhat	Rengith Raghav, Ankita Pai	3:02
7.	"Kanasina Hosaputa (bit)"	Jayanth Kaikini	Rajesh Krishnan	1:10
Total length:				26:34

== Release ==
=== International release ===
The film will be screened overseas in the countries of USA, UK, Australia, Singapore, among others from October 2011 onwards. In California's Bay Area, the screening is scheduled for 14, 15, 16, 22 and 23 October at Serra Theaters.

=== Online release ===
The movie got released online to curb piracy and to reach out to NRI audience. The film was released in two versions. The higher resolution version is priced at five dollars, the low resolution version for two dollars and fifty cents.

== Reception ==
=== Critical response ===
Overall, the film garnered very good reviews from critics. A critic from The Times of India scored the film at 4.5 out of 5 stars and says " It's a movie for the youngistan. There is romance, comedy, dance and witty dialogues to keep you entertained. There is no strong storyline but it concludes with a message for the youth". A critic from Bangalore Mirror wrote "This is not a film where you can search for a story or pinpoint a particularly good aspect. But they could have had better songs, those usually need to go by a ‘first-impression’ basis". A critic from The New Indian Express wrote "who hails from a poor family from a village, wants to work hard to earn money and support his parents but suffers from cancer. Each character has its own uniqueness and the credit must go to director Pavan Kumar. Youth who love fun-oriented flicks could find this movie a worthy watch". B S Srivani from Deccan Herald wrote "The portion between Satish and Digant towards the end appears to be a justification of sorts, a quiet rebellion by the director against convention. But when there’s instant connect with the target audience - the 20 somethings - do niceties matter anymore? ". Shruti Indira Lakshminarayana from Rediff.com scored the film at 3.5 out of 5 stars and wrote "He has done well to avoid any melodrama. Rich visuals, especially in the songs, make the film enjoyable. The second half feels a bit stretched and some smart editing here would have helped". A critic from News18 India wrote "Jnana Murthy captures the mood of the film quite effectively. Editing is also good. Despite some of the flaws, Pawan Kumar's debut film 'Lifu Ishtene' looks interesting and watchable".

== Accolades ==
Award	Category	Recipient(s) and nominee(s)	Result	Ref(s)
59th Filmfare Awards South	Best Film	M. Manjunatha, Syed Salam, R. Upendra Shetty	Nominated	
59th Filmfare Awards South	Best Director	Pawan Kumar	Nominated	
59th Filmfare Awards South	Best Male Playback Singer	Chethan Sosca	Won	
59th Filmfare Awards South	Best Female Playback Singer	Shreya Ghoshal	Nominated	
Suvarna Film Awards	Best Male Playback Singer	Chethan Sosca	Won	
Bangalore Times Film Awards	Best Director	Pawan Kumar	Won	
Bangalore Times Film Awards	Best Youth Film	M. Manjunatha, Syed Salam, R. Upendra Shetty	Nominated	
