= Miss California (film) =

- Official poster
- Directed by: Kodlu Ramakrishna
- Written by: Sathyamurthy Ananduru (dialogue)
- Screenplay by: Vagdevi
- Based on: Megha Mandara by C. N. Muktha
- Produced by: Mallika Dattatreya
- Starring: Diganth; Jahnavi; Soumya
- Cinematography: A.C. Mahendar
- Music by: Ravi Dattatreya
- Release date: 2 June 2006
- Country: India
- Language: Kannada

Miss California is a 2006 Indian Kannada-language romantic drama film directed by Kodlu Ramakrishna and starring Diganth, Jahnavi and Soumya in their lead debuts. The film's storyline is based on C. N. Muktha's novel Megha Mandara.

== Cast ==
- Diganth as Diganth
- Jahnavi as Janu
- Soumya as Soumya
- Jayanthi
- Bhavya
- Sarath Babu
- Geetha
- Dattanna
- Swastik Shankar
- Master Kishan (special appearance in the song "Mailaari Lingaa")

== Production ==
The film was shot in Bangalore, California and Tirthahalli. The film is produced by NRIs. The songs were shot in places such as the Golden Gate Bridge and Stanford University.

== Soundtrack ==
Music by Ravi Dattatreya.

Track listing
No.	Title	Singer(s)	Length
1.	"First Time Heegaaytu Nange"	Ram Prasad, Shreya Ghoshal	5:19
2.	"Ee Bhoomi Aanegu"	Ram Prasad	5:32
3.	"Jaanu Oh Jaanu"	Manjula Gururaj, Ram Prasad	5:16
4.	"Mailaari Lingaa"	Chaitra, Master Kishan, Ram Prasad	4:11
5.	"Love Moodinalli"	Kavitha Krishnamurthy, Ram Prasad	5:04
7.	"Kannadada Makkalella Ondaagi Banni"	Ram Prasad	2:01
Total length:			27:23

== Reception ==
R. G. Vijayasarathy of IANS wrote that "Miss California can be viewed for its rich locales and a good story, but you will get a feeling that the film lacks a strong script". A critic from Rediff.com gave the film a rating of two-and-a-half out of five stars and wrote that "Despite the minor flaws though, Miss California is definitely above average". On the contrary, a critic from Chitraloka wrote that "Based on C.N.Muktha's novel this film Miss California is aptly made for the family viewing". A critic from webindia123 said that "the film has not turned out to be impressive mainly because of an incoherent script and inadequate direction by Kodlu Ramakrishna".
