= Madha Mathu Manasi =

- Directed by: Sathish Pradhan
- Written by: Sathish Pradhan
- Screenplay by: Sathish Pradhan
- Produced by: Mano Murthy; Narasimha Murthy
- Starring: Prajwal Devaraj; Shruti Hariharan
- Cinematography: K. S. Chandrashekar
- Edited by: K. M. Prakash
- Music by: Mano Murthy
- Production companies: Rajesh & Devi Films
- Distributed by: Rajesh & Devi Films
- Release date: 25 November 2016
- Running time: 134 minutes
- Country: India
- Language: Kannada

Madha Mathu Manasi is a 2016 Indian Kannada-language romantic comedy film written and directed by Sathish Pradhan. The film was co-produced and the music was composed by Mano Murthy. It starred Prajwal Devaraj and Shruti Hariharan in the lead roles. Cinematography was by K. S. Chandra Shekar. The film was released with mixed reviews. It was dubbed into Hindi As Anth in 2018 by Pen Movies.

The filming took place in Bengaluru, Madikeri and Mattur and took five months to complete. It was released on 25 November 2016.

== Cast ==
- Prajwal Devaraj as Mass Madha
- Shruti Hariharan as Manasi
- Rangayana Raghu
- Bullet Prakash
- Pawan
- Shobaraj
- Vanishri
- Shamanth Shetty as Deepak
- Anushree as an item number
- Shille Manjunath

== Soundtrack ==
Mano Murthy composed the score and original soundtrack for the film. The lyrics were written by Jayanth Kaikini and Sathish Pradhan.

=== Track listing ===
No.	Title	Lyrics	Singer(s)	Length
1.	"Bareyada Geetheya"	Jayanth Kaikini	Sonu Nigam
2.	"Madha Mathu Manasi"	Sathish Pradhan	Shreya Ghoshal
3.	"Nachle Nachle"	Sathish Pradhan	Shreya Ghoshal
4.	"Byada Maga"	Sathish Pradhan	Kailash Kher
5.	"Omme Nanna Nodu"	Sathish Pradhan	Shankar Mahadevan
6.	"Vismithanade"	Sathish Pradhan	Sonu Nigam, Shreya Ghoshal
