= Savarna Deergha Sandhi =

- Directed by: Veerendra Shetty
- Written by: Veerendra Shetty
- Screenplay by: Veerendra Shetty
- Story by: Veerendra Shetty
- Produced by: Lushington Thomas; Hemanth Kumar; Mano Murthy; Veerendra Shetty
- Starring: Veerendra Shetty; Krishnaa
- Cinematography: Loganathan Srinivasan
- Edited by: Sanketh Shivappa
- Music by: Mano Murthy
- Production companies: Veeru Talkies; Lilac Entertainments
- Distributed by: Lilac Entertainment
- Release date: 18 October 2019
- Running time: 131 minutes
- Language: Kannada

Savarna Deergha Sandhi is a 2019 Indian Kannada-language action comedy-drama written and directed by Veerendra Shetty. The title "Savarna Deergha Sandhi" is a word in Kannada grammar. The film is released in Kannada language starring Veerendra Shetty & actress Krishnaa playing the female lead in the movie. The music is composed by Mano Murthy and produced by Lushigton Thomas, Hemanth Kumar, Mano Murthy, Veerendra Shetty.

== Cast ==
- Veerendra Shetty
- Krishnaa
- Surendra Bantwal
- Padmaja Rao
- Ravi Bhat
- Krishna Nadig
- Ravi Mandya
- Ajith Hanumakkanavar
- Niranjan Deshpande
- Madhu Bharadwaj

== Plot ==
This gangster comedy revolves around Muddanna - an uneducated gangster, who is also a grammar freak. He and his gang commit crimes to help society, while also outsmarting the police and never getting caught. But one day Muddanna falls for a beautiful singer, Amruthavarshini. The film is loaded with ultimate fun, comedy, unexpected twists and turns and a musical drama. It has all elements that will leave its viewers in splits.

== Production ==
The film is of rowdyism, comedy genre. The shooting has been done in Anekallu, Mudigere, Tumakuru, Devarayanadurga, Jigani and Bengaluru localities. Mano Murthy has provided the music. Shankar Mahadevan, Shreya Ghoshal and others have sung the songs. Loganathan Srinivasan of Malayalam movie ‘Ustad Hotel’ fame, has done the cinematography.

== Tracklist ==
No.	Title	Lyrics	Singer(s)	Length
1.	"Kolalaadena"	Veerendra Shetty	Shreya Ghoshal	3:50
2.	"Madhu Madhura"	Veerendra Shetty	Shreya Ghoshal	3:52
3.	"SDS Club Mix"	Veerendra Shetty	Shankar Mahadevan	3:17
4.	"Doorada ee Yaana"	Arjun Lewis	Shashikala Sunil	3:25
5.	"Nee Nudiso Beralu"	Puneeth Appu	Vidisha Vishwas	3:38
6.	"Ede Veene"	Veerendra Shetty	Shashikala Sunil	1:22
7.	"Nenapu Hasiride"	Veerendra Shetty	Shashikala Sunil	1:47
8.	"Savarna Deergha Sandhi"	Veerendra Shetty	Shankar Mahadevan	3:12
