= Mano Murthy =

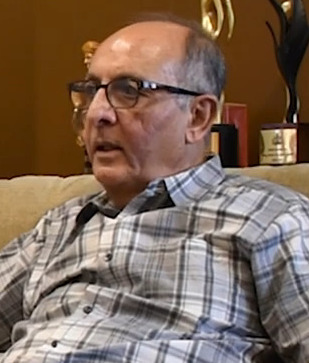
- Murthy in 2022

Background information
- Genres: Film score, theatre
- Occupations: Composer, music director, instrumentalist, entrepreneur, network engineer
- Years active: 1994–present

Mano Murthy is an Indian musician and composer in the Kannada film industry. He is best known for his songs in Mungaru Male, one of the biggest hits in the Kannada industry.

Before moving onto becoming a composer, he was an entrepreneur, having co-founded three companies in California. He was a programmer in Microsoft. His latest venture, an IP security provider called Allegro Systems, was acquired by Cisco Systems. He has judged many reality shows such as Fresh Voice of Karnataka, Saagardaache Sapthaswara and others.

== Early life and education ==
Murthy had nurtured deep interest in music since a young age. He used to play drums when he was an undergrad electrical engineering student at UVCE, Bangalore University. He went to the US for graduate studies at the University of California, Davis and Stanford University.

== Film career ==
He started his music career with composing music for the movie America! America! directed by Nagathihalli Chandrashekhar. The songs of this movie became popular, most notable being the songs "America America" and "Nooru Janmaku". He went on to compose music for the movie Nanna Preethiya Hudugi. The song Car Car of this movie was a big hit. He also composed the Music for National award-winning Movie Preethi Prema Pranaya, and the superhit Comedy movie Jokefalls. In spite of these hit films, his name remained relatively unknown in Kannada filmdom. However Mungaru Male which became the most successful box office hit in Kannada film industry at that time earning Rs. 750 million brought Mano murthy into limelight. It earned him enormous popularity and critical acclaim. Next came another super hit movie Cheluvina Chithara (2007) which gave him much more fame. The quality of music and melody in songs makes him the favourite choice by producers. He also composed music for a Hindi movie in 2005 which did not take off unfortunately.

== Discography ==
Year	Movie	Notes
1997	America! America!	
2001	Nanna Preethiya Hudugi	
2003	Preethi Prema Pranaya	Also co-producer
2004	Jokefalls	
2005	Amrithadhare	
2006	Mungaru Male	Karnataka State Film Award for Best Music Director; Filmfare Award for Best Music Director
2007	Cheluvina Chittara	
2007	Maathaad Maathaadu Mallige	
2007	Geleya	
2007	Milana	Filmfare Award for Best Music Director; Suvarna Film Award for Best Music Director
2007	Hetthare Hennanne Herabeku	
2007	Ee Bandhana	
2008	Moggina Manasu	
2008	Madesha	
2008	Bombaat	
2008	Haage Summane	
2009	Olave Jeevana Lekkachaara	
2009	Male Barali Manju Irali	
2009	Manasaare	
2009	Januma Janumadallu	
2009	Neene Bari Neene	Studio album by Sonu Nigam
2009	Gokula	
2010	Nooru Janmaku	
2010	Pancharangi	
2011	Lifeu Ishtene	
2011	Mr. Duplicate	
2012	Parijatha	
2013	Athi Aparoopa	
2013	Ale	
2014	Abhinetri	
2015	Mast Mohabbat	
2016	Madha Mathu Manasi	Also a producer
2019	Savarna Deergha Sandhi	Also a producer
2022	Magane Mahisha	Tulu film
2022	Sambhrama	
2024	Pranayam	
2025	Gajarama	
2025	Kuladalli Keelyavudo	
2026	America America 2	

== Awards ==
- Filmfare Award for Milana (Ninnindale song)
- Filmfare Award 2006 for Best Music Director, Mungaru Male
- Karnataka State Award 2006 for Best Music Director, Mungaru Male
- E TV Award 2006 for Best Music Director, Mungaru Male
- Sansui Shri Gandha Award 2006 for Best Music Director, Mungaru Male
- Hello Gandhinagar Award 2006 for Best Music Director, Mungaru Male
- Karnataka Chitrarasikara Sangha Award 2006 for Best Music Director, Mungaru Male
- M.S.Ramaih Chitralaya Award 2006 for Best Music Director, Mungaru Male
- Garuda Mall Award 2007 for Most Popular Music Director
- South Cine Fans Award Chennai 2003–2004 for Best Music Director, Preeti Prema Pranaya
- National Award 2004 for Best Movie Preeti Prema Pranaya as Producer
