= Parijatha =

- Film poster
- Directed by: Prabhu Srinivas
- Screenplay by: Prabhu Srinivas
- Story by: M. Rajesh
- Based on: Boss Engira Bhaskaran (Tamil)
- Produced by: Prem Kumar, Paramesh
- Starring: Diganth; Aindrita Ray
- Cinematography: Srinivas Devasam
- Edited by: P. Sai Suresh
- Music by: Mano Murthy
- Production company: P2 Productions
- Distributed by: Jayanna Films
- Release date: 10 February 2012
- Running time: 151 minutes
- Country: India
- Language: Kannada

Parijatha is a 2012 Indian Kannada-language romantic comedy film directed by Prabhu Srinivas starring Diganth, Aindrita Ray and Sharan.

The film is a remake of the Tamil film Boss Engira Bhaskaran starring Arya and Nayantara. The film was a musical hit with the soundtrack and score composed by Mano Murthy. The film also received appreciation for its neat screenplay.

== Cast ==
- Diganth as Boss alias Bhaskar
- Aindrita Ray as Chandrika
- Mukhyamantri Chandru
- Sharan as Sundar
- Ramji as Ramkrishna
- Rachitha Mahalakshmi as Nandhini
- Sadhu Kokila
- Chandan Achar
- Padmaja Rao
- Tanisha Kupanda as Nithya
- Shakeela
- Shashikala
- Kadhal Dandapani
- Raghu Mukherjee
- Shivaji Rao Jadhav

== Soundtrack ==
The songs for the film were composed by Mano Murthy. The song "Oh Parijatha" ranked fourth among the South India's top 20 songs list in Nokia Ovi Store and also another song "Nee Mohisu" has occupied the 12th position in South Top 20 songs list in Nokia Ovi Store.

Parijatha

Soundtrack album by Mano Murthy
- Released: 30 November 2012
- Genre: Feature film soundtrack
- Label: Ananda Audio Video

No.	Title	Lyrics	Singer(s)	Length
1.	"A Chandrika"	Kaviraj	Kunal Ganjawala
2.	"Hudugee"		Rajesh Krishnan
3.	"Nee Mohisu"	Kaviraj	Shreya Ghoshal
4.	"Oh Parijatha"	Kaviraj	Sonu Nigam, Shreya Ghoshal
5.	"Ogoolo Nodtheeni"		Shashikala
6.	"Nee Mohisu (Unplugged)"	Kaviraj	Shreya Ghoshal

== Release ==
Parijatha was released in only eighteen movie theaters in Bangalore.

== Reception ==
=== Critical response ===
Srikanth Srinivasa from Rediff.com scored the film at 3.5 out of 5 stars and says "Srinivas's cinematography is pleasing; a major portion of the film was shot in Mysore. Director Prabhu Srinivas has remained faithful to the Tamil original. This is a film for those who are in love. Go for it and enjoy". A critic from Bangalore Mirror wrote "Sharan is the star performer in this film. Mukhyamantri Chandru has made one of his rare appearances in films of late. Parijata, billed as Valentine’s Day special, does not live up to its expectations". A critic from News18 India wrote "Sreenivas' camera work makes a very good impact. 'Parijatha' is an enjoyable comedy film, thanks to chemistry of the lead pair Diggy and Andy". A critic from NDTV wrote "Mano Murthy's music and background score gel with the mood of the film. The title song and "Nee Mohisu" are good compositions".
