= Neene Bari Neene =

Studio album by Sonu Nigam
- Released: 2009 (India)
- Recorded: 2009
- Genre: Indian pop
- Label: Times Music
- Producer: Ashok Kheny

Neene Bari Neene is a studio album by singer Sonu Nigam. It was released in 2009, and was produced by Ashok Kheny, composed by Mano Murthy, and its lyrics were written by lyricist and writer Jayanth Kaikini.

== Production ==
Madhuri Bhattacharya worked on two music videos for the album including the titular track and "Baa Nodu Gelathi", which also appears in the feature film Neene Bari Neene.

== Track listing ==
All of the songs are composed by Mano Murthy, performed by Sonu Nigam, and written by Jayanth Kaikini.

Number	Song title	Length
1	"Innu Anisutide"	5:49
2	"Naa Ninagaagi"	5:47
3	"Neene Bari Neene"	5:45
4	"Ninna Hindeye"	4:55
5	"Beku Beku"	5:04
6	"Baa Nodu Gelathi"	5:08
7	"Eega Bandiruve"	5:06
8	"Ideye Ninage Samaya"	4:51
9	"Haaduntu Namma Naadali"	4:49

=== Reception ===
A critic from Bangalore Mirror wrote, "Mano may have exhausted an year’s stock of love ditties here, but along with lyricist Jayanth Kaikini and Sonu Nigam, he produces a consistently ballad’ish album reminiscent of Sonu’s Deewana and Jaan.

== Feature film ==
Neene Bari Neene
- Directed by: Deepak Thimaya
- Written by: Deepak Thimaya; Vinayak Bhat
- Produced by: Ashok Kheny
- Starring: Anish Tejeshwar; Deepika Kamaiah; Samyukta Hornad
- Cinematography: Ananth Urs
- Edited by: Laxman Reddy
- Music by: Mano Murthy
- Production company: AKK Entertainment
- Distributed by: Bahar Enterprises
- Release date: September 18, 2015
- Country: India
- Language: Kannada

A film with the same name was released on 18 September 2015, starring Anish Tejeshwar, Deepika Kamaiah, and Samyukta Hornad in the lead roles. The film was directed by Deepak Thimaya and the story co-written by Vinayak Bhat. All the songs from the 2009 album have been retained in the film. The film is shot in and around Sakleshpur and Bangalore.

=== Reception ===
A critic from The Times of India rated the film 1.5/5 stars and wrote, "Watch this one if you're a fan of Sonu's old album by the same name".
