= Ee Bandhana =

- Poster
- Directed by: Vijayalakshmi Singh
- Written by: B.A. Madhu; Vijayalakshmi Singh
- Story by: B.R. Chopra; Achala Nagar; Satish Bhatnagar; Ram Govind; Shafiq Ansari
- Based on: Baghban by Ravi Chopra
- Produced by: Jai Jagadish; Vijayalakshmi Singh
- Starring: Vishnuvardhan; Jaya Prada; Ananth Nag; Tara; Darshan
- Cinematography: Ajay Vincent
- Edited by: B. S. Kemparaju
- Music by: Mano Murthy
- Production company: Dakshath Combines
- Release date: 21 December 2007
- Running time: 170 minutes
- Country: India
- Language: Kannada

Ee Bandhana (transl. This Romantic Bond) is a 2007 Indian Kannada-language drama film directed and co-produced by Vijayalakshmi Singh. This marks her debut directorial project. It stars Vishnuvardhan and Jayapradha while Darshan, Ananth Nag, Tara, Sharmiela Mandre, Tarun Chandra and Jennifer Kotwal form the rest of the ensemble cast. The movie was produced by Jai Jagadish for Dakshath Combines.

The film is a remake of Hindi film Baghban (2003) which was an unofficial adaptation of the 1937 Hollywood fim Make Way for Tomorrow which had earlier inspired the 1958 Kannada film School Master. The music is scored by Mano Murthy. The film was met with a positive response from critics.

== Cast ==
- Vishnuvardhan as Harish Raj
- Jayaprada as Nandini
- Darshan as Kiran in an extended cameo appearance
- Ananth Nag as Narayana Ullagaddi
- Tara as Sukanya (Sukku)
- Tarun Chandra as Kapil
- Sharmiela Mandre as Priya
- Jennifer Kotwal as Pallavi in an extended cameo appearance
- Jai Jagadish as Balachander
- Doddanna as Siddarama
- Shivaram as Govinda
- G. K. Govinda Rao as Siddarth Besanth
- Ashwath Neenasam
- Raghu Samarth
- Madhu Hegde
- Arundhathi Jatkar
- Vaibhavi
- Nayanshekar

== Production ==
The film was supposed to be directed by Sachin in early 2007.

== Soundtrack ==
The music of the film was composed by Mano Murthy. The songs "Lets Dance" and "Adhe Bhoomi" were hits.

Ee Bandhana

Soundtrack album by Mano Murthy
- Released: 25 September 2007
- Genre: Feature film soundtrack
- Length: Anand Audio
- Producer: Mano Murthy

No.	Title	Lyrics	Singer(s)	Length
1.	"Chanda Nanna Chandramukhi"	Jayanth Kaikini	Udit Narayan, Sadhana Sargam	05:35
2.	"Adhe Bhoomi Adhe Bhanu (Part 1)"	Jayanth Kaikini	Sonu Nigam, Shreya Ghoshal	05:27
3.	"Banna Banna"	V. Nagendra Prasad	Kunal Ganjawala, Sunidhi Chauhan	04:16
4.	"Ugadi Ugadi"	K. Kalyan	S. P. Balasubrahmanyam, Nanditha	04:46
5.	"Lets Dance Mathe Mathe"	Kaviraj	Rajesh Krishnan, Chaitra H. G.	07:47
6.	"Adhe Bhoomi Adhe Bhanu (Part 2)"	Jayanth Kaikini	Sonu Nigam, Shreya Ghoshal	05:27

== Release and reception ==
The film was scheduled to release on 9 November 2007, but it was delayed.

Ee Bandhana received generally positive reviews from film critics upon its release. The lead actors Vishnuvardhan and Jayapradha were garnered with best performances by all the critics. Darshan's special appearance was also lauded by most of the critics. Actors Ananth Nag and Tara too got critical appraisals for their portrayals. Sify.com rated the movie 3 stars and declared the film as "above average". Rediff.com lauded the technical team's effort and rated 3 out of 5 stars and commented that the film is "worth watching".

== Awards ==
- Filmfare Awards South
1. Filmfare Award for Best Supporting Actress - Kannada - Tara
