= Vaana (film) =

- Film poster
- Directed by: M. S. Raju
- Written by: M. S. Raju; Paruchuri Brothers
- Based on: Mungaru Male by Yogaraj Bhat
- Produced by: M. S. Raju
- Starring: Vinay Rai; Meera Chopra
- Cinematography: Sekhar V. Joseph
- Edited by: K. V. Krishna Reddy
- Music by: Kamalakar
- Production company: Sumanth Art Productions
- Release date: 15 January 2008
- Country: India
- Language: Telugu

Vaana (transl. Rain) is a 2008 Indian Telugu-language romantic drama film directed and produced by M. S. Raju. It is a remake of the 2006 Kannada-language film Mungaru Male. The film stars Vinay Rai (in his Telugu debut) and Meera Chopra, while Suman, Jayasudha, Naresh, Seetha, and Diganth (reprising his role) play supporting roles. The music is composed by debutant Kamalakar with cinematography by Sekhar V. Joseph and editing by K. V. Krishna Reddy. The film released on 15 January 2008 to mixed-to-negative reviews and was a flop at the box-office. The film was dubbed in Tamil as Gnabagangal Thalattum in 2013.

== Plot ==
Abhiram (Vinay Rai) is the only son of Uma (Jayasudha) and Babji (Naresh). On a visit to a mall amidst a heavy wind, he spots a pretty girl named Nandini (Meera Chopra). Whilst staring at her, he inadvertently falls into a manhole. Nandini rescues him from the pit but in the process loses her heart-shaped watch that she had just bought.

While accompanying his mother to Araku, Abhi confronts a man named Jaanu (Ajay). Jaanu, who has been following Nandini, beats up Abhi, mistaking him to be dating her. Abhi, unaware that Jaanu has vowed not to allow anyone near Nandini, thrashes him and his gang in return.

In Araku, Abhi meets Nandini unexpectedly. He identifies himself, expresses his love, and offers to tie the watch as an indication of his intention to marry her. Nandini, who is already engaged, rejects his proposal. Still, Abhi vows to marry her if she meets him again. Uma takes Abhi to her friend Bharathi's (Seetha) house. There, Abhi discovers that his host in Araku, Col. Choudary (Suman), is Nandini's father. Choudary is deaf, and Nandini's marriage is only a week away. Dejected, Abhi throws Nandini's watch away. Nandini calls him and asks him to meet her. Delighted, Abhi goes in search of her watch. While searching for it, he spots a rabbit, which he names Devadas and brings along with him. Eventually, he finds the watch.

Abhi takes Nandini to the railway station to receive her friends who are due to arrive from Mumbai for the wedding. The train from Mumbai is delayed by five hours, so Nandini and Abhi decide to visit a nearby temple. While returning from the temple, Abhi and Nandini are caught in the rain. An old couple offers them shelter inside their hut. Abhi, still in two minds about expressing his love to Nandini, grabs a few toddy bottles, goes out in the rain, and starts drinking. When Nandini walks towards an intoxicated Abhi, offering an umbrella, he tells her that he had better stay away from her to keep from making a move on her.

Nandini is now in love with Abhi and is in a dilemma as her wedding is in a few days. She requests him to take her to the top of a waterfall and expresses her love to him, standing at the edge of the waterfall. Abhi, intent on marrying Nandini, takes Choudary for a morning jog to discuss his marriage with her, but Choudary, a heart patient, tells Abhi that he is expected to die anytime, and his only wish is to marry Nandini off to Gautam (Diganth). Later, Nandini asks Abhi if he told their story to her father, to which Abhi replies that he doubted her love. Abhi is angered and insults Nandini by saying that she betrayed her parents and asks her the guarantee that she will not betray him. Hurt, Nandini slaps Abhi and leaves in tears. On the night before the marriage, Abhi drives away without taking Devadas. He then starts drinking in a bar and finds Gautam asking the bar owner (Narsing Yadav) for directions to Choudary's home. When Jaanu tries to kill Gautam, Abhi saves Gautam and convinces himself that only Gautam is suitable to marry Nandini.

The following day, Abhi drops Gautam at the marriage venue but declines to attend the marriage. Gautam asks for the heart-shaped watch as a remembrance, but Abhi refuses to give it as he likes it himself. Abhi then wishes Gautham a happy married life. He then finds Devadas near his car and takes the rabbit in. Meanwhile, Gautam is marrying Nandini. Abhi drives to the waterfall where Nandini proposed to him, but as he is driving, Devadas dies. The film ends with Abhi burying Devadas near the edge of the waterfall.

== Cast ==
- Vinay Rai as Abhiram
- Meera Chopra as Nandini
- Suman as Col. Chowdary
- Jayasudha as Uma
- Naresh as Babji
- Diganth as Gautam
- Seetha as Bharati
- Ajay as Jaanu
- Paruchuri Venkateswara Rao as Venkatachalam, Chowdary's friend
- Giri Babu as Rama Chandra Murthy, Abhiram's father
- Suhasini Maniratnam as Snehalatha, Abhiram's mother
- M. S. Narayana as M. S. Narayana
- Krishnudu as Mani, Chowdary's servant
- Narsing Yadav as Bar Owner
- Dharmavarapu Subramanyam as Vithal
- Rajitha as Vithal's wife
- Prabhu Deva in a cameo appearance in the song "Unnattaa Lenattaa"
- Sunil in a cameo appearance in the song "Unnattaa Lenattaa"

== Production ==
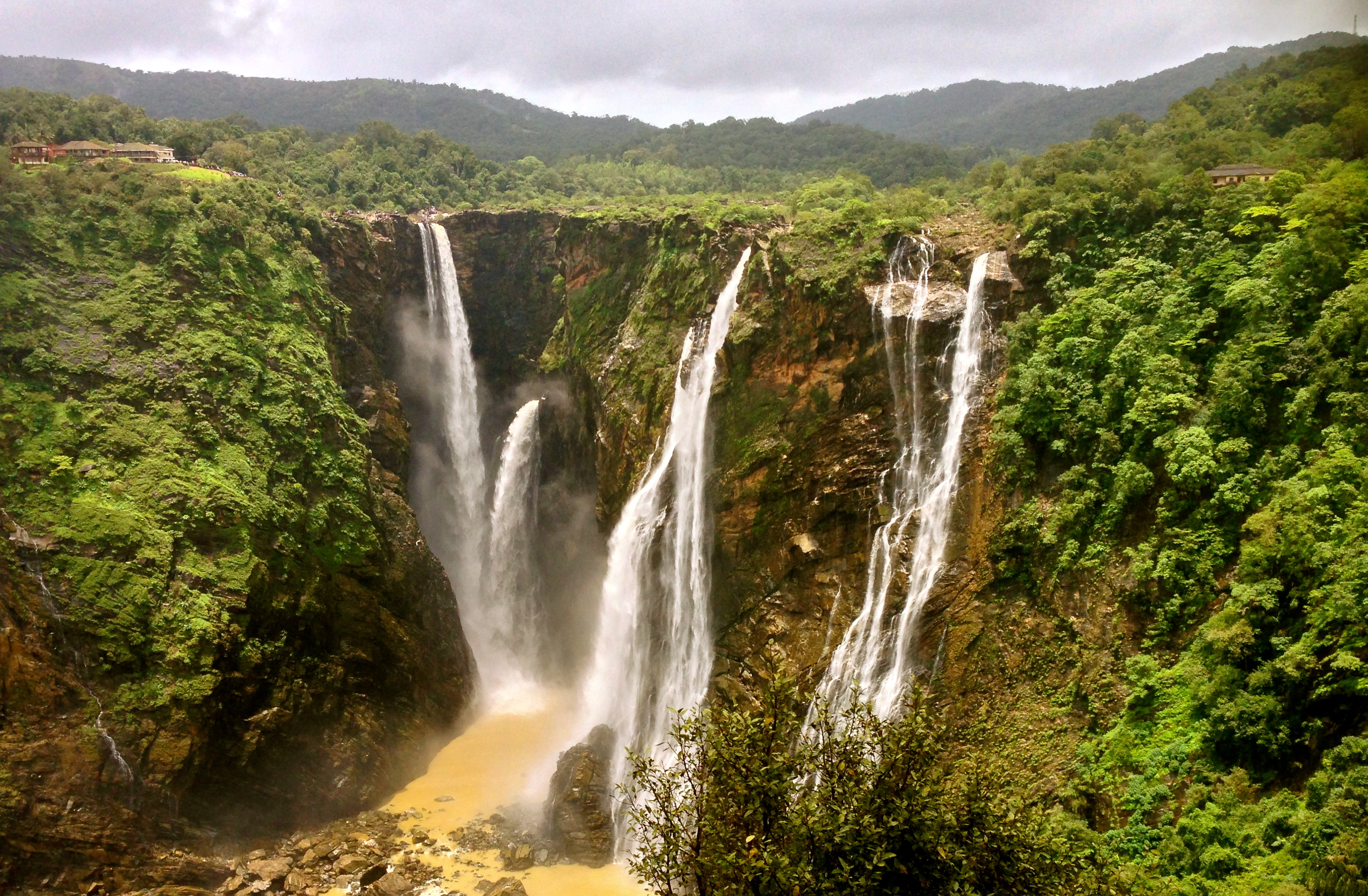
Jog Falls in Sagara, Karnataka, where a few sequences of the film were shot.

Director M. S. Raju wanted to remake the Kannada-language blockbuster film Mungaru Male, which featured Ganesh and Pooja Gandhi. Initially, his son Sumanth Ashwin was to play the hero, but Raju wanted a mature actor and chose Vinay, who previously starred in Jeeva's Unnale Unnale (2007), to make his Telugu debut. Meera Chopra was added to the cast as lead heroine, while Diganth reprised his role from the original.

== Soundtrack ==
The soundtrack of the film is composed by debutant Kamalakar. All lyrics written by Sirivennela Seetharama Sastry.

The album consists of eight tracks, out of which two ("Anisuthide" and "Mungaru Male") from the original Kannada film were retained ("Yeduta Nilichindi" and "Aakasa Ganga"). The humming at the beginning of "Kunidu Kunidu Baare" from the original was retained in "Sirimalle Vaana", which was based on "Kurisindi Vaana" from Bullemma Bullodu (1972).

The audio launch was held on 14 December 2007 at Annapoorna Studios.

Track Listing
No.	Title	Singer(s)	Length
1.	"Aakasa Ganga"	Karthik	5:09
2.	"Dolare Dolare"	Ranjith	4:16
3.	"Muvvante Maina"	Mallikarjun, Gopika Poornima (humming)	6:05
4.	"Sirimalle Vaana"	K. S. Chithra, Ranjith	4:07
5.	"Unnatta Leenatta"	Ranjith	4:32
6.	"Akasa Ganga (Sad Version)"	Karthik	1:22
7.	"Yeduta Nilichindi (Male)"	Karthik	4:50
8.	"Yeduta Nilichindi (Female)- Ventapadutundi"	K. S. Chithra	1:12

== Release and reception ==
Jeevi of Idlebrain.com rated the film 3/5 and wrote, "On a whole, Vaana is an unappealing film". A critic from Sify praised the performances of several members of the cast.
