= Abhinetri (2015 film) =

2015 Kannada film produced by Pooja Gandhi

- Theatrical release poster
- Directed by: Sathish Pradhan
- Screenplay by: Sathish Pradhan
- Story by: Sathish Pradhan
- Produced by: Pooja Gandhi; Jyothi Gandhi
- Starring: Pooja Gandhi; Atul Kulkarni; P. Ravi Shankar
- Cinematography: K. S. Chandrashekhar
- Edited by: K. M. Prakash
- Music by: Mano Murthy
- Production company: Pooja Gandhi Productions
- Distributed by: Vayuputra Films; Jyothi Films; Meghashree Films; RJ Films
- Release date: 30 January 2015
- Running time: 153 minutes
- Country: India
- Language: Kannada

Abhinetri – The Tragedy of a Legend is a 2015 Indian Kannada language film directed by Sathish Pradhan. It stars Pooja Gandhi in the lead role. The film is based on the life of actress Kalpana. The supporting cast features Makarand Deshpande, Srinagar Kitty, Atul Kulkarni, P. Ravi Shankar and Neethu. After much delay in the post production, the film opened on screens on 30 January 2015.

== Synopsis ==
The movie is a loose biopic about Minuguthaare Kalpana, Kannada's yesteryears actress played by Pooja Gandhi. Her rise and fall are both captured. The movie begins with a young girl who wishes to become a film star. When she sets on to follow her dream, she's taken aback by the number of film personalities wanting sexual favours from her to project her talent.

Soon, however, she finds fame. This makes her arrogant, and this slowly begins to affect her life. Her popularity which had reached its peak is now slowly falling and it hits rock bottom. Things start going very miserable, and she eventually ends her life. The movie is a tragic tale of a legend.

== Cast ==
- Pooja Gandhi as Sharat Lata / Nanda
- Makarand Deshpande as Krishna Raju
- Atul Kulkarni as Shivaiah
- P. Ravi Shankar as Betageri Gangaraj
- Ramesh Bhat
- Sudha Belavadi
- Ramya Barna
- Achyuth Kumar
- Srinagar Kitty
- Shailaja Joshi
- Radhika Gandhi in Cameo appearance
- Jyothi
- Neethu
- Vanishree

== Production ==
=== Development and casting ===
It was revealed in July 2013 that Pooja Gandhi would produce and essay the lead role in the film, while Makarand Deshpande, who had appeared in a few Kannada films earlier, was confirmed with a part in the film. Srinagar Kitty's cameo role in the film was confirmed in April 2014. Talking about her preparations for the film, Gandhi said she watched Kalpana's films like Eradu Kanasu, Belli Moda, Gejje Pooje, Kappu Bilupu and Sharapanjara, to get her mannerisms and body language right.

=== Filming ===
Filming reportedly began in November 2013. Satish Pradhan, the director of the film, having denied initially that the film is based on the life of actress Kalpana, later revealed the fact, after the court ruling in their favor of a case filed by author Bhagya Krishnamurthy. He said, "We spoke to a lot of yesteryear actors and directors like KSL Swamy, Bhagawan, PH Vishwanath, Leelavathi, Jayanthi and BV Radha to understand the dynamics of the film industry back then, and got their inputs and impressions about Kalpana from their interactions with her." Gandhi admitted to the same, following the revelation that the film was based on the life of Kalpana. Sequences of the film were shot in AVM Studios and the beaches of Chennai, which were the filming locations of the 1970s. The theatre scenes were shot at Gudigeri Basavaraj and Malathi Sudhir Drama companies which still had props from the 1970s including vintage mirrors.

== Controversies ==
The film which was set to release on 6 June, but release was delayed after a complaint was filed at a local court in Bangalore by novelist Bhagya Krishnamurthy. She alleged that the film was based on a serialised novel Abhinetriya Antaranaga, written by her for the weekly Kannada magazine Mangala, in 2003. The producer and lead actress of the film, Pooja Gandhi commented saying, "There is no similarity between my film and the novel. The team hadn't heard of the novel until the case was filed." In August 2014, the case was ruled in favor of Gandhi, thus allowing the release of the film.

In August 2014, Puttanna Kanagal's daughter said that her father was shown in bad light in the film. Kanagal allegedly had an affair with actress Kalpana, on whom the film is based. The director of the film, Satish Pradhan replied to this saying, "As a director, I have followed his direction. I honour Puttanna's work and respect him as a director. Why would I want to get into his personal life? The story is inspired by actress Kalpana and her life. Puttanna is in the picture but we have not disrespected him. Where is the necessity to create a different story? They can't assume anything about Abhinetri before even watching the film. The news of Puttanna's daughter being unhappy came to my ears too. If it reaches the chamber and they call me, I would definitely abide by their instructions."

== Soundtrack ==
Abhinetri

Soundtrack album by Mano Murthy
- Released: 21 March 2014
- Genre: Feature film soundtrack
- Length: 28:32
- Language: Kannada
- Label: Anand Audio

Mano Murthy chronology
Ale (2012)	Abhinetri (2014)

Mano Murthy composed the music of the film and lyrics for the soundtrack were penned by Jayant Kaikini and V. Nagendra Prasad. The soundtrack album has six songs. The song "Thamnam Thamnam" was taken from the film Eradu Kanasu (1974). The music for the song was composed by the duo Rajan–Nagendra and lyrics penned by Chi. Udaya Shankar. Its music for Abhinetri was re-created by Mano Murthy.

The soundtrack album of Abhinetri was released officially on 21 March 2014 in Chowdiah Memorial Hall, Bangalore with playback singer Shreya Ghoshal, who sang five songs in the film, attending as chief guest.

Track listing
No.	Title	Lyrics	Music	Singer(s)	Length
1.	"Manasinalli Niranthara"	Jayant Kaikini	Mano Murthy	Sonu Nigam	5:07
2.	"Naviradha Nalume"	Jayant Kaikini	Mano Murthy	Shreya Ghoshal	5:11
3.	"Naa Nimma Rambhe"	V. Nagendra Prasad	Mano Murthy	Shreya Ghoshal	4:48
4.	"Daiva Baredha Katheyali"	Jayant Kaikini	Mano Murthy	Shreya Ghoshal	4:23
5.	"Thamnam Thamnam"	Chi. Udaya Shankar	Mano Murthy	Shaan, Shreya Ghoshal	4:34
6.	"Abhinetri Horateya"	Jayant Kaikini	Mano Murthy	Shreya Ghoshal	4:29
Total length:					28:32

== Release and reception ==
The satellite rights of the film were bought by Zee Kannada in mid-2014. It was given the "U/A" (Parental Guidance) certificate by the Regional Censor Board. The makers were asked to cut two scenes from the film and 11 dialogues were muted. It was set for a late-2014 release, but got delayed in its post-productions stages. Prior to its release, news reports emerged that the film was being dubbed in eight languages including Tamil, Telugu, Malayalam, Hindi, Bhojpuri, Bengali and Marathi. It released theatrically on 30 January 2015.

== Critical reception ==
Upon theatrical release, the film opened to mixed reviews from critics.

G. S. Kumar of The Times of India rated the film 3.5/5 and wrote, "The director has done a good job of a neat script" and added, "While the first half keeps you hooked, with a pacy narrative, the second half lags as the story stretches unnecessarily." On the acting performances he wrote, "Atul Kulkarni, Makarand Deshpande, Ravishankar, Achyuth Kumar gel well with their characters" and that for Pooja Gandhi "a dubbing artiste would have done a better job of her voice." He concluded writing, "While music by Mano Murthy is in tune with the storyline, KS Chandrasekhar's cinematography scores high."

S. Viswanath of Deccan Herald rated the film 3/5 and wrote, "Abhinetri is also not superlative cinema. Too theatrical and stretched, Abhinetri would have turned true cinema with crisper editing and more polished performances. Atul Kulkarni is an exception, and he shows his class and command." He added that Gandhi was supported well by other actors but for Makarand Deshpande who he felt was miscast as a "bucktoothed, lascivious film producer."

Shyam Prasad S. of Bangalore Mirror reviewed the film rating it two out of five, and called it "A tale of lost opportunities". He felt the film fails "by not making it clear to every potential audience which character in the film was which in real life". He added that "the good thing about the film are its colours." He concluded praising the roles of cinematography "in presenting the old era in digital shades, and the music." Muralidhara Khajane of The Hindu called the film "an attempted biopic" of Kalpana and wrote, "While one has to appreciate the efforts put in by Pooja Gandhi, the director could have utilised the talent of Makarand Deshpande and Atul Kulkarni in a better way. Ravishankar steals the show towards the end."

Shashiprasad S. M. of Deccan Chronicle rated the film 1.5/5 and wrote that the film was "a big disappointment". On Pooja Gandhi's performance, he wrote that "despite putting her best ever, [she] fails to impress and dubbing her own voice in the film makes it even more worst."

Desimartini rated it 3.3/5 and described it as an "honest, neat and decent effort that deserves all the encouragement it can get by gracing it and supporting such ventures".

== Box-office ==
- The film was performed fairly well at the box-office, collecting ₹3 crore against a budget of ₹2 crore.
