= Ninagaagi Kaadiruve =

Indian film

- DVD cover
- Directed by: Jolly Bastian
- Produced by: B V Sathish Babu
- Starring: Vishal Hegde; Pooja Gandhi
- Cinematography: P Rajan
- Edited by: K Girish Kumar
- Music by: Robin Gurung
- Release date: 16 October 2009
- Country: India
- Language: Kannada

Ninagaagi Kaadiruve is a 2009 Indian Kannada-language film directed by Jolly Bastian starring Vishal Hegde and Pooja Gandhi in lead roles.

== Cast ==
- Vishal Hegde as Nandan
- Pooja Gandhi as Swetha
- Dileep Raj as Vishwas
- M. S. Umesh
- Suresh Mangalore
- Mohan Juneja
- Bank Suresh
- Dr Vijaykumar
- Rakesh Lobo

== Music ==
Ninagaagi Kaadiruve

Soundtrack album by Robin Gurung
- Released: 2009
- Recorded: 2009
- Genre: Feature film soundtrack
- Length: 20:46
- Language: Kannada

Official audio
- Ninagaagi Kaadiruve- Full Album on YouTube

Track listing
No.	Title	Singer(s)	Length
1.	"Bahumanavade Neenu"	Shaan	4:36
2.	"Jhoom Jhoom Anuva"	K. S. Chithra	3:53
3.	"Rampam Rangina"	Shankar Mahadevan	3:07
4.	"Iduve Jeevana"	Kavitha Jayaram	5:00
5.	"Ninagagi Kadiruve"	Smrithi Surendranath, Nachiket Abhyankar	4:50
Total length:			20:46

== Reception ==
=== Critical response ===
R G Vijayasarathy of Rediff.com scored the film at 1.5 out of 5 stars and says "Pooja Gandhi looks glamorous in the song sequences, but her performance is average. Vishal Hegde is the pick of the lot. Dileep scores in the villain's role though it is not well defined. The Bahumaanavaadhe song is well composed by Robin Gurang. Camera work is just passable. All in all, Ninagaagi Kaadiruve is a big yawn. Watch it only if you do not have any other alternative". A critic from Deccan Herald wrote "Touted a suspense-thriller-cum-love story, ‘Ninagagi...’ preys on viewers’ nerves. Coming just a week after ‘Huchchi’, Pooja’s nervous pants and shrieks do not register, damaging the nearly non-existent storyline. She should also be taught the nuances of diction. Another mystery is why an actor like Dileep Raj chose such a role. Jolly Bastian has taken everyone for a jolly ride with this one". A critic from Bangalore Mirror wrote "Though it is commendable that Pooja Gandhi is dubbing for her roles, her accent adds to the snickering moments for the audience. Ninagaagi Kaadiruve is not a bad film and is worth a watch but it could have been much better".
