= Nagareega Komali =

- Directed by: Ramji S. Balan
- Written by: Ramji S. Balan
- Produced by: S. Jaganathan
- Starring: Bala Joseph; Neetha Sree
- Cinematography: G. K. Raj
- Edited by: V. T. Vijayan
- Music by: Ramji S. Balan
- Production company: Ramji Cine Arts
- Release date: 17 February 2006
- Running time: 130 minutes
- Country: India
- Language: Tamil

Nagareega Komali (transl. Decent Clown) is a 2006 Indian Tamil language drama film directed by Ramji S. Balan. The film stars newcomer Bala Joseph and Neetha Sree, with Bala Singh, Sabitha Anand, N. S. K. Rajan, Paravai Muniyamma, Swaminathan and Easter playing supporting roles. The film was released on 17 February 2006.

== Plot ==
In Madurai, Gopi (Bala Joseph) lives with his widowed mother (Sabitha Anand) and runs a cable TV comedy channel called "Nagareega Komali" with his friends. To push up their viewer rating, Gopi and his friends also prank people and telecast it on their channel. One day, Gopi pranks an old woman who was selling idly on the roadside and he gets scolded on phone by an anonymous woman. Gopi tracks down the caller's number and finds the woman: his new neighbour Kaveri (Neetha Sree), a gutsy and outspoken woman who fights for justice and spreads social awareness. In the meantime, a few people are falling into a coma in the city after being administered a strong dose of chloroform. One day, Gopi witnesses Kaveri giving an injection to a greedy loan shark. Gopi then meets her father Ellaiah (Bala Singh) who is working in a tea shop and Ellaiah tells him about their bitter past.

Many years ago, in Tanjore, Ellaiah was a farmer who lived happily with his wife and kids. But in 1995, due to drought and lack of water, Ellaiah decided to get a bank loan to build a well in his land. However, there was no water in the well and he could not farm as before so he sold his land. Encumbered with debts and suffering from hunger, Ellaiah, his wife, his little son and Kaveri decide to commit suicide by drinking poison. His wife and son died but Kaveri and Ellaiah survived. Thereafter, for Kaveri's studies, they came to Madurai.

Back to the present, Kaveri scolds Gopi and his friends for wasting their time with their comedy channel. Her speech is the eye-opener for Gopi and he decides to do relevant shows for the society on their channel. Gopi slowly falls in love with Kaveri. In the meantime, Kaveri is arrested for giving injections to loan sharks. Thereafter, Gopi faces a lot of problems for making socially conscious shows. Kaveri is then released on bail from jail. Gopi cannot anymore run his cable TV channel as he wished joins, so he joins hand with Kaveri to start a newspaper called "Nagareega Komali".

== Cast ==
- Bala Joseph as Gopi
- Neetha Sree as Kaveri
- Bala Singh as Ellaiah, Kaveri's father
- Sabitha Anand as Gopi's mother
- N. S. K. Rajan as Tea master
- Paravai Muniyamma as Vegetable seller
- Swaminathan as Serial director
- Easter as Dialogue writer
- Rosario as Serial actor
- Udhay as Cinematographer
- Selvakumar as Serial actor
- Malini Vaman as Serial actress
- Roshanraj as Gopi's friend
- Kumar Vadivel as Guna, Gopi's friend
- Shankar as Gopi's friend
- Bava Lakshmanan as Corrupt man

== Production ==
Ramji S. Balan made his directorial debut with Nagareega Komali under the banner of Ramji Cine Arts. Bala Joseph (credited as Jaisakthi), the grandson of Suruli Rajan, was selected to play the lead role while Kannada actress Neetha Sree was chosen to play the female lead. N. S. K. Rajan, the grandson of late comedian N. S. Krishnan, signed to play the role of a tea stall owner. The director said, "There's a relevant message in this film for Tamil society". The film was entirely shot in Madurai.

== Soundtrack ==
Nagareega Komali

Soundtrack album by Ramji S. Balan
- Released: 2006
- Recorded: 2006
- Genre: Feature film soundtrack
- Length: 36:57
- Producer: Ramji S. Balan

Ramji S. Balan chronology
Nagareega Komali (2006)	Udumban (2012)

The film score and the soundtrack were composed by Ramji S. Balan. The soundtrack features 9 tracks with lyrics written by Bharathidasan, Ekadasi and Muthusamy.

Tracklist
No.	Title	Singer(s)	Length
1.	"Chellattha"	Karisal Karunanidhi	0:50
2.	"Kalluri Kootai"	Anuradha Sriram	5:28
3.	"Kandan Kandan"	Murugadasan	0:42
4.	"Mattu Vandi"	Arumugam, Madurai Chandran, Karisal Karunanidhi	5:18
5.	"Naadu Summa"	Paravai Muniyamma	5:33
6.	"Ore Paarvaiyil"	Murugadasan, Karisal Karunanidhi	6:08
7.	"Patchai Niramedutthu"	Arumugam, Kottai Sami, Mariyamma	5:47
8.	"Puthiyadhor Ulgam"	Sriram Vyas	1:35
9.	"Vatti Vatti"	Anuradha Sriram	5:36
Total length:			36:57

== Release ==
Malini Mannath of Chennai Online said "Nagareega Komaali may not be the best film to happen. But it does keep you entertained for the most part with its cheeky lines and take-offs. If only it wasn't so preachy". Another reviewer lauded the film's message but criticised the preachy tone of the film.
