= Anisuthide =

Song by Sonu Nigam

from the album Mungaru Male
- Released: 6 November 2006
- Recorded: 2006
- Genre: Feature film soundtrack
- Length: 4:36
- Label: Anand Audio
- Composer: Mano Murthy
- Lyricist: Jayant Kaikini

Music video
- "Anisuthide" on YouTube

"Anisuthide" is a song composed by Mano Murthy for the 2006 Indian Kannada romance musical film Mungaru Male. Directed by Yogaraj Bhat, the film stars Ganesh and Pooja Gandhi in the lead roles. Written by Jayant Kaikini, the song was sung by Sonu Nigam. It met with frenzied response from fans upon the release of the album and remains very popular among Kannada listeners.

== Background ==
In late December 2005, Yogaraj Bhat, ready with the story for his next film Mungaru Male, called on Mano Murthy to score music for it. A US-bound Murthy contacted him back on reaching the US, when they discussed the lyrics and music for the soundtrack at length, for over seven months on phone and email. Murthy worked on the music in the US as filming was on course in India. On his return to India, the music was recorded, sometime after August 2006.

== Recording ==
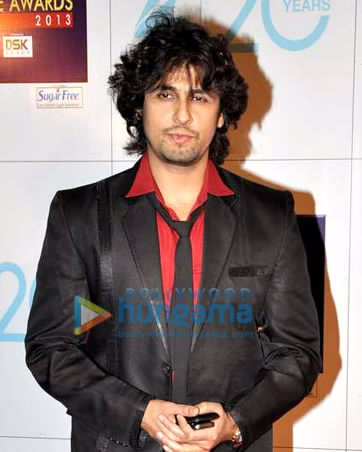
Anisutide song sung by Sonu Nigam

Jayant Kaikini, a poet, and well known then for his romantic songs, was asked to write the lyrics. On scoring for it, Murthy made his wife Lata listen to the tunes and on her suggestion Sonu Nigam was asked to sing. Nigam, who then predominantly recorded Hindi songs and only a handful in Kannada, faced difficulty in the diction. He would pronounce the first word "Hanisuthide" in lieu of "Anisuthide".

== Reception ==
Following the album's release in November 2006, it topped Kannada music charts, with "Anisuthide" receiving maximum airtime on radio and television. Even five months after the song's release, it continued among the most popular song among listeners.
