= Neethu =

Indian film actress

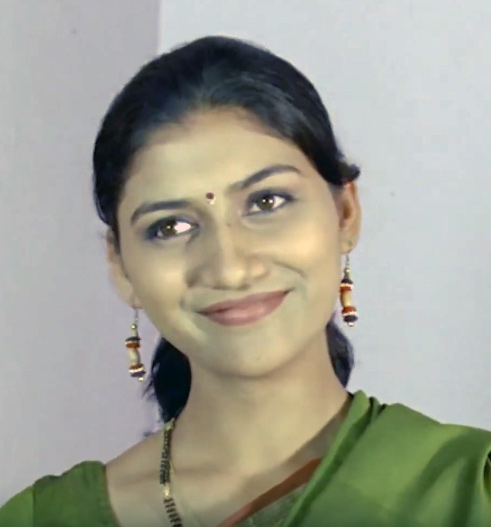
- Born: Neetha; 2 September 1986 (age 39); Mangalore, Karnataka, India
- Other names: Neethu Shetty, Neetha
- Occupation: Actress
- Years active: 2004–present

Neethu (born 2 September 1986), also known as Neethu Shetty, is an Indian actress who predominantly appears in Kannada-language films and a few Tulu and Malayalam films. She won acclaim and praise for movies like Joke Falls (2004), Beru (2005), Photographer (2006), Koti Chennaya (2007), Gaalipata (2008), Krishna Nee Late Aagi Baaro (2009) and many others.

She has done cameos in other successful movies like Abhinetri and Fair & Lovely. Neethu is also socially active and recently studied Dream Tracking and is currently practicing it. With a career spanning over 2 decades, she has been a part of 35+ movies and many television projects.

== Early life ==
Neethu was born in Mangalore, in the Karnataka State of India. Her father, Manjunath Shetty, belonged to the Bunt community, and was an agriculturist. Her mother, Mohini is from a Konkani-speaking family and was a banker. Neethu has a younger sister. They grew up and were educated in Mangalore and Bangalore. Her father died in 2011.

== Career ==
Neethu Shetty acted in Punya, a serial directed by Nagathihalli Chandrashekhar and made her debut through the Jaggesh and Komal-starrer Govinda Gopala and then went on to act in a horror flick Yahoo, which was an average grosser. Her first commercially successful movie was Joke Falls, where she was paired alongside Ramesh Aravind, which was positively reviewed, and was directed by Ashok Patil. She then starred in the movie Beru, directed by P. Sheshadri, which received many accolades such as National Film Award for Best Feature Film in Kannada and Karnataka State Film Award for Best Film.

She made her Malayalam debut alongside Mohanlal in the Malayalam film Photographer. She is a recipient of the Karnataka State Film Award for Best Supporting Actress for her performance in the Tulu language film Koti Chennaya. Her performance in her next movie, Poojari, opposite Aadhi Lokesh, brought her closer to the Kannada audience. She received positive reviews for her performance in the 2008 movie Gaalipata, which was a multi-starrer and a blockbuster hit. She received a Filmfare Award for Best Supporting Actress – Kannada nomination. She later starred in films which some were successful, like Krishna Nee Late Aagi Baaro, Abhinetri and a few others. She also starred in movies such as Aithalakkadi and others that received negative reviews and failed at the box office.

She was a contestant in Bigg Boss Kannada 2, where she survived 80 days, hence becoming the first contestant in the history of Bigg Boss Kannada to be kept in a "secret room". She was a part of the comedy show Bengaluru Benne Dose alongside Arun Sagar. She later appeared as a guest in Bigg Boss Kannada 4 along with Rishika Singh, Tsunami Kitty, N. C. Ayyappa and Bigg Boss Kannada 3 winner Shruti. She also was a part of box cricket league where she was a player for the team Davangere Lions, which emerged runners up.

== Filmography ==
- Note: all films are in Kannada, unless otherwise noted.

Key
†	Denotes films that have not yet been released

Year	Title	Role	Notes
2004	Yahoo	Geethu	credited as Neetha
2004	Jennifer	Jennifer	credited as Neetha
2004	Joke Falls	Sulekha	credited as Neetha
2005	Beru	Suma	credited as Neetha
2005	Karavali Hudugi	Akku	
2006	Eesha	Gowri	credited as Neetha
2006	Nagareega Komali	Kaveri	Tamil film; credited as Neetha Sree
2006	Photographer	Satyavathi	Malayalam film
2007	Poojari	Priya	credited as Neethashree
2007	Oliver Twist		Malayalam film; credited as Neethashree
2007	Agrahara	Ramya	
2007	Govinda Gopala	Aishwarya	credited as Neetha
2007	Koti Chennaya	Deyi Baidithi	Tulu film
2008	Gaalipata	Radha	
2008	Ganesha Matthe Banda	Gayatri	
2009	Manasaare	Bhaamini	
2010	Ugragami		
2010	Krishna Nee Late Aagi Baaro	Andy	
2010	Pancharangi	Latha	Voice Over (Dubbing) for Ramya Barna
2010	Aithalakkadi	Sevanthi	
2011	Yogaraj But	Sihi	
2011	Panchamrutha	Tanmayi a.k.a. Tanu	segment "Samarasave Jeevana: harmonious life"
2011	Ujwadu	Shaantheri	Konkani film
2012	Jeevana Joke-alli	Paaru	
2012	Puneeth	Herself	Special Appearance
2013	Devarane	Sheela	Cameo appearance
2013	Jeethu	Herself	Special appearance in the song "Idli Vade"
2013	Crazy Star	Herself	Special appearance in the song "Ee Hennu Avala Weakness"
2014	Fair & Lovely	Herself	Guest appearance
2014	Jaggi	Herself	Special appearance in the song "Nela Gudi Neeru"
2015	Abhinetri		Cameo
2015	Eregla Panodchi	Rukmini	Tulu film
2015	Ring Road		Cameo
2016	Ice Pice	Geetha	
2017	Paaru I Love You	Paaru	
2017	Sithara	Priya	
2017	Mombatthi	ACP Shivani	
2018	Mari Tiger	Special appearance	
2018	Amrutha Galige	Amrutha	
2019	Vajramukhi	Vajramukhi	
2019	Hangover	Herself	Special appearance in the song "Naane Rukku Kodtini"
2022	Indira	Dr. Suhani	
2023	1888	Sandhya Shetty	
2023	Parishuddham	Herself	Special Appearance
TBA	Aparadhi Nanalla	TBA	Filming, Guest Appearance
TBA	Iralarade Iruve Bitkonda	TBA	Filming

=== Television ===
Year	Title	Role	Channel	Notes
2003	Punya	Television Debut	Udaya TV	
2012	Kuniyonu Baara	Finale Judge	Zee Kannada	
2014	Bigg Boss Kannada 2	Contestant	Star Suvarna	
2014	Super Minute	Contestant	Colors Kannada	Winner against Aadi Lokesh
2015	Bengaluru Benne Dose	Co-host	Star Suvarna	
2016	Swalpa Adjust Madkoli	Abhinetri Promotion	Star Suvarna	With Pooja Gandhi
2017	Bigg Boss Kannada 4	Guest	Colors Kannada	
2017	Super Talk Time	Guest	Colors Super	Alongside Yogesh
2017	Maja Bharatha	Guest	Colors Super	Paaru I Love You promotion
2018	Sixth Sense	Player	Star Suvarna	Alongside Karunya Ram
2019	Maja Bharatha	Guest	Colors Super	Vajramukhi promotion
2019	Saval Ge Sai	Celebrity Special	Udaya TV	1888 promotion
2019	Kitchen Darbar	Celebrity guest	Star Suvarna	
2020	Namaste Karnataka with Neethu	Celebrity guest	Udaya TV	
2021	Chat Corner	Celebrity Guest	Colors Kannada	Alongside Shubha Poonja
2022	Gaalipata 2 Varamahalakshmi Vishesha	Guest	Zee Kannada	Alongside Bhavana Rao, Diganth
2023	Kanyadaanadalli Neethu Sandana	Special Appearance	Udaya TV	Special Appearance

== Awards and nominations ==
Year	Award	Category	Film	Result	Notes
2007	Karnataka State Film Awards	Best Supporting Actress	Koti Chennaya	Won	
2008	Filmfare Awards South	Best Supporting Actress in Kannada	Gaalipata	Nominated	
2008	Suvarna Film Awards	Best Supporting Actress	Gaalipata	Nominated	
