= Gokula (film) =

2009 Indian film by Prakash Veer

- Theatrical release poster
- Directed by: Prakash
- Written by: M. S. Ramesh (dialogues)
- Screenplay by: Prakash, Mahesh Kumar, Suresh Yellappa, Rakshith Shivaram
- Story by: Prakash
- Produced by: Thashwini Prakash
- Starring: Vijay Raghavendra; Yash; Pooja Gandhi; Raghavendra Raj
- Cinematography: Satya Hegde
- Edited by: M. Varman
- Music by: Mano Murthy
- Production company: Abhay Surya Creations
- Release date: 27 November 2009
- Country: India
- Language: Kannada

Gokula is a 2009 Indian Kannada-language comedy drama film written, directed and co-produced by Prakash. It stars Vijay Raghavendra, Yash, Pooja Gandhi, Pawan, Raghavendra Raj and Nakshatra in the lead roles. Actress Ragini Dwivedi is featured in a special appearance in an item song. The soundtrack and original score is composed by Mano Murthy and the cinematography is by Sathya Hegde.

The film was theatrically released on 27 November 2009.

== Plot ==
The film is about four orphans who join hands to make a quick buck. They enter an elderly couple's home and try to loot the property in disguise of their children. The situation turns very emotional as the days pass and they become very attached to the couple.

== Cast ==
- Vijay Raghavendra as Raja
- Yash as N. Raja
- Pooja Gandhi as Leela
- Pawan as Guru
- Raghavendra Raj as Shankar
- Nakshatra as Maala
- Srinivasa Murthy
- Sumithra
- Ravi Kale
- Kote Prabhakar
- Ragini Dwivedi as an item number

== Soundtrack ==
The music of the film was composed by Mano Murthy. The audio album was released in September 2009.

Gokula

Soundtrack album by Mano Murthy
- Released: September 2009
- Genre: Feature film soundtrack
- Length: Adithya Music

| No. | Title | Lyrics | Singer(s) | Length |
|---|---|---|---|---|
| 1. | "One By Two Jeevana" | Dhananjaya | Tippu | 05:35 |
| 2. | "Aaramagi Idde Naanu" | Jayanth Kaikini | Sonu Nigam, Shreya Ghoshal | 05:27 |
| 3. | "Baruve Odi Odi" | Jayanth Kaikini | Karthik, Ritisha Padmanabh | 04:16 |
| 4. | "Maja Madokke" | Dhananjaya | Karthik, Ritisha Padmanabh | 04:46 |
| 5. | "Neene Helu Nannadaavudu" | Jayanth Kaikini | Sonu Nigam | 07:47 |
| 6. | "Aaramagi Idde Naanu (remix)" | Jayanth Kaikini | Sonu Nigam, Shreya Ghoshal | 05:27 |

== Reception ==
=== Critical response ===
A critic from The Times of India scored the film at 3 out of 5 stars and says "Vijaya Raghavendra, Yash, Pavan and Raghavendra Raj are brilliant while Pooja Gandhi brings alive her character. Sumitra, Srinivasamurthy and Ravi Kale do justice to their roles. Nakshathra deserved a better role. While Sathya Hegde's camerawork is superb, Mano Murthy's music is all right". A critic from Deccan Herald wrote "The theme of filial love, in that sense, has been given mature treatment. Likewise, the costume design deserves mention for being meticulous and not spoiling the continuity of each character. Choreography is good too - Ragini is stylish, not giving enough reason to support the ‘item number’ controversy. Time to head to Gokula now". A critic from Bangalore Mirror wrote "This is a film with a very good intention falling short for in utilising the screenplay to the maximum. One example is where the old man played by Srinivas Murthy is said to have saved his home once by sitting on a protest demonstration in front of the Vidhana Soudha. This incident is just a dialogue in the film instead of a good scene. Many characters do not reveal what they really are due to such cost-saving measures at the wrong places".

== Awards and nominations ==
| Year (Note: Refers to the year in which the ceremony was held.) | Category | Award | Nominee | Result |
|---|---|---|---|---|
| 2010 | Favorite Heroine | Suvarna Film Awards | Pooja Gandhi | Won |
