= Putnanja =

1995 film by Ravichandran

- DVD cover
- Directed by: Ravichandran
- Screenplay by: Ravichandran; B. Suresha (Dialogue)
- Produced by: Ravichandran; A. Narasimhan
- Starring: Ravichandran; Meena; Umashri; Lokesh
- Cinematography: G. S. V. Seetharam
- Edited by: K. Balu
- Music by: Hamsalekha
- Release date: 12 January 1995
- Running time: 152 minutes
- Country: India
- Language: Kannada

Putnanja is a 1995 Kannada language film directed by Ravichandran and produced by A. Narsimhan. This film stars Ravichandran, Meena, Umashri, Lokesh in lead roles. Music was composed by Hamsalekha. The film is based on the 1972 Tamil movie Pattikada Pattanama.

== Plot ==
This film depicts the story of a farmer named "Putnanja", living with his grandmother, Putmalli, near Nanjangud town in Mysore district. Putnanja is a man respected by everyone in the village and was well-known for his kindness towards poor and backward. When Putnanja hears a news regarding arrival of Roja to India (who went to America for studies during childhood and whom Putnanja likes and wants to marry), he rushes towards her place to propose her to marry him. When Putnanja goes and proposes her, she does not even recognize him, and suggests not to talk about their marriage in future days. Putnanja's aunt wants her daughter Roja to marry a rich, educated person and hence opposes Putnanja's proposal, but his maternal uncle wants her daughter to marry him since he is kind and good. But he can't do anything he wants since he is a hen- pecked husband.

Once Putnanja proposes Roja's family to come to their village festival and spend some days with them. Although Taara refuses to go, due to Roja's insistence, she accepts to go to their village. Roja likes the tour very much. She even starts liking Putnanja due to his kindness towards people. After returning to the city Dharmayya manages to convince Roja to marry Putnanja, despite her mother's opposition. As day passes Roja tries to enjoy life in village in the city manner neglecting all the rules that has to be followed in the village and one day she reaches above limit range by burning the plouge which is treated as god by the villagers. Then Putnanja slaps her for celebrating her birthday by spilling beer all over the place and enjoying in a way which doesn't at all fit in a village life. This makes Roja to leave the village.

One day Roja realises that she's pregnant with Putnanja's child and decides to take care of the child without any help from him. As soon as she gives birth to the child, Putmalli takes the child and goes to her village. When Roja realizes that she can't live without Putnanja and her child she rushes towards his village and they then lead a happy life together.

== Cast ==
- Ravichandran as Putnanja
- Meena as Roja/Rose
- Umashri as Putmalli, Putnanja's grandmother
- Lokesh as Putnanja's maternal uncle, Roja's father
- Satyajith as an opponent of Putnanja in the village
- Kavitha
- Pooja Lokesh

== Production ==
Ravichandran originally started a film called Chandamama however he changed his mind and made a different film which became Putnanja. Jolly Bastian who previously worked as stuntman got his break as stunt choreographer with this film. The dialogues were written by B. Suresha. Umashree was cast as Putmali, completely different from comedic roles she was known for and performed at that time. Ravichandran originally considered Sowcar Janaki, Kanchana and Leelavathi for this role however he felt none of them fitted the role hence Umashri was chosen.

== Soundtrack ==
Putnanja

Soundtrack album by Hamsalekha
- Genre: Feature film soundtrack
- Length: 39:05
- Label: Jhankar Music

Hamsalekha wrote the lyrics and composed all the songs in the film. The album has eight soundtracks. The "Dasara Gombe" song is based on Mother Russia by Iron Maiden. Ravichandran adopted a different strategy to release the songs when anyone calls his office through phone, the songs from the film would be played on the phone as he wanted people to listen to the songs before buying the soundtrack.

Track list
No.	Title	Lyrics	Singer(s)	Length
1.	"Naanu Putnanja"	Hamsalekha	Mano	4:45
2.	"Nammamma"	Hamsalekha	Mano, K.S. Chithra	5:00
3.	"Puttamalli"	Hamsalekha	Mano, K.S. Chithra	4:41
4.	"Haadiro"	Hamsalekha	K.S. Chithra, Mano	4:58
5.	"Puttamalli - Patho"	Hamsalekha	Mano	5:06
6.	"Dasara Gombe"	Hamsalekha	Mano	4:42
7.	"Rangero Holi"	Hamsalekha	Mano, Minmini	4:49
8.	"Naanu Putnanja - Pathos"	Hamsalekha	Mano, Shyamala Bhave, Minmini	5:04
Total length:				39:05

== Awards ==
Umashri won the filmfare award for best supporting actress for her role as "Putmalli".

== Box office ==
The film ran for more than 25 weeks and declared a blockbuster.
