= Minmini =

Indian singer (born 1970)

- Born: P. J. Rosily
- Occupation: Singer
- Years active: 1988–1995; 2005–present
- Spouse: joy

Minmini (born P. J. Rosily; 12 August 1970) is a South Indian film playback singer. She is best remembered for the song "Chinna Chinna Aasai" from Roja, the debut work of film composer A. R. Rahman, which was dubbed in Hindi as "Choti Si Asha". Most of her songs are in Tamil, most of them composed by Ilaiyaraaja and A. R. Rahman. Her Malayalam songs include "Souparnikamritha" from Kizhakkunarum Pakshi, "Oonjal Urangi", and "Neelaraavi" from Kudumbasametham. She has lent her voice to songs from films including Enga Thambi (1993), Karuththamma (1994), and Thevar Magan (1992). She made a comeback in 2015 with the song "Kanmaniye" from Mili.

== Early life and education ==
Minmini was born at Keezhmedu, Aluva, Kerala. She is the youngest of four girls. Her parents are P. A. Joseph and Treeza. Her name was P. J. Rosily in school. While her elder sisters were part of the choir at the village church, she started her singing career at the age of 5 with Kalabhavan, a local orchestra. She studied at St Francis Girl's High School, Aluva.

== Career ==
Minmini had her film debut with Malayalam film Swagatham (1989), directed by Venu Nagavalli. She sang three songs in it, composed by Rajamani. She was introduced to Tamil film industry by Ilayaraja through Tamil film - Meera (1992). Ilayaraja christened her Minmini, making her name more appealing to the Tamilians. Minmini's first Telugu movie is "Aathmabandham" with music by Maragathamani.

Her big break came in 1992 when she sang "Chinna Chinna Aasai" for the film Roja. The number became such a big hit that the location where it was shot, Paana Theertham Falls in Tirunelveli district, attracted huge visitors and the Tamil Nadu government had to ban tourists to protect environment for almost nine years.

Minmini has sung a few Kannada film songs in 1995 for the movies Putnanja, shelved Rama and Betegara. Rangero holi a duet song with Mano from the movie Putnanja for Hamsalekha. In the same film she rendered humming in the song Putamalli puttamalli with Mano and Shyamala G. Bhave. Thayiya Neneyona from the movie Rama in 1995 for A. R. Rahman. She went on to work with Sadhu Kokila for the movie Betegara where she sang the song Mididiralu saviganasugalu with Mano.

Gopi Sundar brought her back to the industry with the song "Kanmaniye" for the film Mili in 2015.

== Personal life ==
Minmini married Joy Mathew in 1995 (Keyboard player of Koratty). The couple have a son and daughter. Minmini lost her voice in 1993 on a stage show in London. She was unable to even speak for some years. She regained her voice through treatments. Later she made a comeback. Along with her husband, she has also started a music school named Joy's Academy Of Performing Arts at Kakkanad in the then Cochin (now Kochi).

== Discography ==
List of songs recorded by Minmini

== Tamil film songs ==
Year	Song Title	Movie	Composer
1993	Methuva Thanthi	Thalattu	
1993	Ennodu Potti Ittu	Thalattu	
1992	Chinna Chinna Aasai	Roja	A. R. Rahman
1992	Love Na Love'vu Mannena Stove'vu	Meera	
1992	Amman Koil Vaasaliley	Thirumathi Palanisamy	
1992	Kuthaala Kuyilea	Thirumathi Palanisamy	
1992	Oru Maalai Chandiran	Unnai Vaazhthi Paadugiren	
1993	Kurukku Paathaiyile	I Love India	
1993	Malaiyoram Maankuruvi	Enga Thambi	
1993	Adi Poonguyile Poonguyile	Aranmanai Kili	
1993	Amman Kovil Kumbam Inge	Aranmanai Kili	
1993	Raathiriyil Paadum Paattu	Aranmanai Kili	
1993	Kanmanikkul Chinna Chinna	Chinna Mappillai	
1993	Anbe Vaa Anbe Vaa Unnodu Naan	Ezhai Jathi	
1993	Parkathey Parkathey	Gentleman	A. R. Rahman
1993	Sambo Sambo	Pudhiya Mugam	A. R. Rahman
1993	Ada Aathiram Kollathe	Rakkayi Koyil	
1994	Kothamalli Vaasum (Vaa Munimaa)	Indhu	Deva
1994	Pacha Kili Paadum	Karuththamma	A. R. Rahman
1994	Chithirai Nilavu	Vandicholai Chinraasu	A. R. Rahman
1994	Chinna Mullu Thottuvida	Vedan	
1994	Thendral Varum Munne	Dharma Seelan	
1994	Thottu Thottu Thukkiputtu	Unna Nenachen Pattu Padichen	
1994	Vaadi En Sengamalam	Rasukutty	
2002	Sattena Nenaindhadhu Nenjam	Kannathil Muthamittal	A. R. Rahman
