= Paris Pranaya =

- Official poster
- Directed by: Nagathihalli Chandrashekar
- Written by: Nagathihalli Chandrashekar
- Produced by: Amarnatha Gowda; Harinath Policharla; Tumkur Dayanand; Vidyashankar
- Starring: Raghu Mukherjee; Minal Patil
- Cinematography: Krishna Kumar
- Edited by: Basavaraj Urs
- Music by: Stephen Prayog
- Production company: 21st Century Lions Cinema
- Release date: 18 April 2003
- Running time: 151 minutes
- Country: India
- Language: Kannada

Paris Pranaya (transl. Romance in Paris) is a 2003 Indian Kannada-language romantic drama film directed and written by Nagathihalli Chandrashekar. The film stars newcomers Raghu Mukherjee and Minal Patil in the lead roles whilst Rajesh, Tara and Sharath Lohitashwa feature in other prominent roles. The film was produced by 21st Century Lions Cinema banner.

The film released on 18 April 2003 to generally positive reviews from critics. Extensively shot in many European locales such as Paris, Rome, Southern France and Spain, the film covers a scene of the annual "Vishwa Kannada Sammelana - 2002" held at Detroit. It went on to win awards at the Filmfare Awards South and Karnataka State Film Awards for the year 2003.

== Cast ==
- Raghu Mukherjee as Krish alias Krishna
- Minal Patil as Poorvi
- Rajesh as H. K. Master
- Sharath Lohitashwa as Aditya
- Tara as 'Cell' Seetha
- Harinath Policharla
- Sumalatha
- Sudha Belawadi
- Nagathihalli Chandrashekar guest appearance

=== Voice-over ===
- Rajesh Krishnan dubbed for Raghu Mukherjee
- Nanditha dubbed for Minal Patil

== Production ==
Nagathihalli Chandrashekhar began working on the script in January 2002. Raghu Mukherjee, the winner of the 2002 Mister Grasim International, plays an NRI from Europe. Minal Patil was to make her debut with Janani but was later replaced. The song "Rome Rome" was shot in Barcelona during the La Mercè celebrations.

== Music ==
Paris Pranaya

Soundtrack album by Stephen Prayog
- Released: 25 March 2003
- Genre: Feature film soundtrack
- Length: 36:11
- Label: Akash Audio

Stephen Prayog chronology
Paris Pranaya (2003)	Karka Kasadara (2005)

The music of the film was composed by Stephen Prayog. The soundtrack focused mainly on the fusion music of Indian and western styles. Popular Bollywood playback singers Sonu Nigam and Shreya Ghoshal rendered their voices for the songs, with Ghoshal making her debut in Kannada cinema. The soundtrack included a pure Kannada light music song "Yede Thumbi Haadidenu" composed by Mysore Ananthaswamy and written by acclaimed poet G. S. Shivarudrappa. On the other side, it had the musical bits played by the giants of Western Classical Music such as Beethoven and Mozart. The track "Krishna Nee Begane Baaro" is an adaptation of the renowned classical song of the same name, originally composed and written by saint Vyasatirtha in the raga Yamuna Kalyani.

All music is composed by Stephen Prayog.

Paris Pranaya (Original Motion Picture Soundtrack)
No.	Title	Lyrics	Artist(s)	Length
1.	"One Foot Distance"	Nagathihalli Chandrashekar	Suresh Peters, Jaspinder Narula	5:05
2.	"Dhig Dhig Digantadache"	Nagathihalli Chandrashekar	Srinivas, K. S. Chitra	6:40
3.	"Yede Thumbi Hadidenu"	G. S. Shivarudrappa	Nanditha	5:16
4.	"Krishna Nee Begane Baaro"	Nagathihalli Chandrashekar	Shreya Ghoshal Sonu Nigam	5:47
5.	"Aa Biliyara Deshada"	Nagathihalli Chandrashekar	K. S. Chitra, Rajesh Krishnan, Madhu Balakrishnan	3:45
6.	"Appanaane"	Nagathihalli Chandrashekar	Nanditha, Hemanth Kumar	3:54
7.	"Rome Rome"	Nagathihalli Chandrashekar	Shreya Ghoshal, Sonu Nigam	5:44
Total length:				36:11

== Release and reception ==
The film released on 18 April 2003 alongside Kutumba (2003). Viggy.com wrote, "Nagathihalli excels once again in Paris Pranaya through sharp dialogs, sober comedy apart from introducing two new talents to Kannada film industry in the form of Raghu Mukherjee and Minal Patil". Chitraloka.com wrote that Paris Pranaya "is a panoramic view of Europe besides being palatable, paradigm, pragmatic and praiseworthy. All because of the passionate and diligent director Nagathihalli Chandrasekhar and his team". Despite releasing to positive reviews, the film was a box office failure.

== Awards ==
- Karnataka State Film Awards
1. Best Music Director - Stephen Prayog
2. Best Lyricist - Nagathihalli Chandrashekar
3. Best Female Playback Singer - Nanditha for "Ede Tumbi Hadidenu"
- Filmfare Awards South
1. Best Film - Tumkur Dayanand
