= Raghu Mukherjee =

Indian Kannada film actor, model and male beauty pageant titleholder

- Born: Bangalore
- Spouses: Deepa (m. 2003; div. 2005) Bhavana (m. 2009; div. 2014) Anu Prabhakar (m. 2016)
- Beauty pageant titleholder
- Years active: 2003–present
- Major competitions: Mr. International 2002 (winner); Grasim Mister India 2002 (winner)

Raghu Mukherjee is an Indian Kannada film actor and model.

== Career ==
Mukherjee won the Grasim Mr. India title in February 2002 and soon started receiving modelling assignments and thus pursued modelling for a while. He started his film career, after he won the Mister International title in October 2002, at the age of 20, with Kannada director Nagathihalli Chandrashekar for his film Paris Pranaya released in 2003. In 2009, Mukherjee appeared in the film Savari. Later he acted in a few more films like Prema Chandrama and Nee Illadhe (2011) and the gangster drama Dandupalya (2022). He has also been a reality TV show host and has appeared in television commercials.

== Personal life ==
On April 25, 2016, Mukherjee married actress Anu Prabhakar. They have a daughter named Nandana.

== Filmography ==
Year	Title	Role	Notes
2003	Paris Pranaya	Krishna	
2009	Savari	Abhiram	Nominated – Filmfare Award for Best Actor - Kannada
2011	Nee Illadhe	Sanjay	
2011	Prema Chandrama	Sanjay	
2011	Panchamrutha	Vasi	segment "Kshamaya Dharithri: the forgiveness"
2012	Parijatha	Guest Appearance	
2012	Dandupalya	Hari	Nominated – SIIMA Award for Best Actor in a Supporting Role – Kannada
2014	Aakramana	Subhash	
2014	Aryan	Surendra Patil	
2014	Super Ranga	Ranganath	
2014	Angulimala	Buddha	
2016	Preethiyalli Sahaja		
2016	Jessie	Shyam Prasad	
2017	Meenakshi		
2017	Kaafi Thota	Niranjan	
2017	Dayavittu Gamanisi	Raghu	
2021	Inspector Vikram	Prathap Mishra	
2022	Head Bush	M. D. Nataraj	
2024	Bhamakalapam 2	Sadanand	Telugu film
2025	Royal		
