= 1888 (film) =

2023 Indian Kannada film by Sourabh Shukla

- Directed by: Sourabh Shukla
- Story by: Sourabh Shukla Manju Raj
- Starring: Neethu; Manju Raj; Prathap Kumar; Vikram Kumar; Adhvithi Shetty; Valerian Menezes
- Cinematography: M Pradeep
- Edited by: Puneeth M Degavi
- Music by: Girish Hothur
- Production company: Starfish Studios
- Release date: April 2023
- Running time: 115 minutes
- Country: India
- Language: Kannada

1888 is a 2023 Indian thriller film shot using Guerrilla filmmaking technique. It is an independent Kannada film with demonetization as the backdrop. More than 60% of the film is shot at night. Neethu Shetty plays a leading role alongside Prathap Kumar, Adhvithi Shetty, Manju Raj, Pradeep Doddaiah and Vikram Kumar. Former Mr. India - Raghu Ramappa appears in a guest role in the movie. The movie is directed by debutante Sourabh Shukla who has also written the story and screenplay. Pradeep is the director of photography and Girish Hothur is the music composer.

== Cast ==
- Neethu Shetty as Sandhya Shetty
- Prathap Kumar as Vikas
- Adhvithy Shetty as Ankita
- Manju Raj as
- Vikram Kumar as Aruna
- Pradeep Doddaiah as Pradeep Shetty
- Sourabh Shukla as PK
- Valerian Menezes as Martin

== Critical reception ==
In a review for The Times of India, Sridevi S rated the film 3 stars from 5. There was praise for the story being well researched, and for the plot, car chase sequences, and the performance of Neethu Shetty. However, there was criticism of the dialogue and slow pace in the first half. The review stated ... "While the first half takes off slowly, the second half makes it all worth the wait."

Prathibha Joy's review for OTTplay considered the film to have a really slow start but that the second half is much better. Giving a rating of 2.5 stars from 5, Joy praised the originality of the story. She stated ... "1888 is an interesting film that starts on a wobbly note and settles into a steady rhythm only much later. Once it does it's a smooth ride thereafter."
