= Neenyare =

Indian film

- Directed by: Sindesh
- Written by: Sindesh
- Produced by: Varada Reddy T
- Starring: Suraj; Ramya Barna; Sambrama
- Cinematography: K M Vishnuvardhan
- Edited by: T Govardhan
- Music by: V. Manohar
- Production company: Sri Amba Bhavani Movie Makers
- Release date: 19 December 2008
- Country: India
- Language: Kannada

Neenyare (transl. Who are you?) is a 2008 Kannada-language film directed by Sindesh and starring Suraj, Ramya Barna and Sambrama. The music was composed by V. Manohar. The film was released in India on 19 December 2008.

== Cast ==
- Suraj as Surya
- Ramya Barna as Megha
- Sambrama as Sinchana
- Om Prakash Rao
- Sarath Babu
- Tulasi
- Sathyajith
- Vaijanath Biradar
- Mandeep Roy

== Production ==
This film marks Ramya Barna's lead debut and she landed the role while in college.

== Summary ==
Megha grows up resenting Surya from childhood. But her feelings change towards him, when she was saved by him, from goons. Unfortunately Surya, is in love with another women. Would they reconcile at the end, is the movie.

== Soundtrack ==
All music is composed by V. Manohar.

No.	Title	Singer(s)	Length
1.	"Ee Thuditha"	Sonu Nigam
2.	"Preethiyali"	Hemanth
3.	"Makaranda"	Kunal Ganjawala
4.	"Super Computer"	KK
5.	"Hrudayava (Bit)"	Chaya
6.	"Nee Andhareno"	K. S. Chithra
7.	"Devaraane Devarallo"	Madhu Balakrishnan
8.	"Varava Needadha (Bit)"	Chaya

== Reception ==
A critic from Bangalore Mirror wrote that "Though rich in colours and special effects, a lot more money should have been invested in putting together the story. The director fails in this attempt and his dragging narration and excessive focus on dialogues that preach rather than tell the story pulls the film down". A critic from IANS wrote, "The film's first half could have been trimmed, excluding the unnecessary comedy scenes. The second half has many engaging moments".

Despite reportedly receiving positive reviews, the film was removed from Sagar theatre in Bangalore. The film was a box office failure.

== Accolades ==
Event	Category	Recipient	Ref.
2008–09 Karnataka State Film Awards	Best Cinematography	K. M. Vishnuvardhan	
2008–09 Karnataka State Film Awards	Best Art Director	K. Raju	
