= Hani Hani (film) =

- Directed by: Sharan
- Written by: Rama Narayanan (dialogue)
- Screenplay by: Sharan
- Story by: Sharan
- Produced by: P. Veerakumar; N. Chandru; M. Raju
- Starring: Tarun Chandra; Pooja Gandhi
- Cinematography: M. R. Seenu
- Edited by: Srinivasa Babu
- Music by: S. Chinna
- Production company: V C R Productions
- Release date: 8 February 2008
- Country: India
- Language: Kannada

Hani Hani (transl. Droplet, droplet) is a 2008 Indian Kannada-language romantic drama film directed by Sharan and starring Tarun Chandra and Pooja Gandhi. The music for the film was composed by S. Chinna. The film was a box office failure.

== Cast ==
- Tarun Chandra as Rahul
- Pooja Gandhi as Ramya
- Rangayana Raghu
- Jai Jagadish
- Sihi Kahi Chandru
- Bhavya
- Chitra Shenoy
- Kishori Ballal
- Loknath
- C. R. Simha
- H. G. Dattatreya
- Bharath Bhagavathar
- R. G. Vijayasarathy
- Jayakumar
- Suresh Rai
- Praveen
- Jayalakshmi
- Shailaja Somashekhar
- Veena Sundar
- Meenakshi Hathri
- Ruthu
- Malathi
- Kempe Gowda
- Akash Kanade
- Ramya Barna

== Production ==
Pooja Gandhi plays a "simple girl next door" in this film.

== Soundtrack ==
The music was composed by S. Chinna, a music director who previously worked with Mani Sharma, in his Kannada debut.

Track listing
No.	Title	Singer(s)	Length
1.	"Beda Beda"	Gurukiran, Chinmayi	4:48
2.	"Dhinaku Dhina"	Karthik	5:00
3.	"Hani Hani"	Rajesh Krishnan, Lakshmi	4:33
4.	"Malli Malli"	Rajesh Krishnan	4:38
5.	"Ninna Ee Preethige"	Sonu Nigam, Shreya Ghoshal	5:22
Total length:			24:21

== Reception ==
R. G. Vijayasarathy of Rediff.com wrote that "Hani Hani is a positive film that may go down well with the younger audience". A critic from IANS wrote that "Hani Hani is an enjoyable fare despite some dragging sequences. And the music of course, rocks!"
