= Nannedeya Haadu =

Indian romantic drama film

- VCD cover
- Directed by: Guruvendra
- Written by: Immadi Venkatesh (dialogue)
- Screenplay by: Immadi Venkatesh
- Story by: Guruvendra
- Starring: Anand; Ramya Barna; Charashri
- Cinematography: Mallikarjuna
- Edited by: Shivaraj Mehu
- Music by: A T Raveesh
- Production company: Sanath Prekshitha Combines
- Release date: 29 May 2009
- Country: India
- Language: Kannada

Nannedeya Haadu (transl. The song of my heart) is a 2009 Indian Kannada-language romantic drama film directed by Guruvendra and starring Anand, Ramya Barna and Charashri with Ramesh Bhat in a supporting role.

== Plot ==
Mohan goes to Shankara Shastry's class for music lessons in order to impress his lover Spoorthi but he also falls in love with his music teacher's granddaughter Pallavi.

== Cast ==
- Anand as Mohan
- Ramya Barna as Pallavi
- Charashri as Spoorthi
- Ramesh Bhat as Shankara Shastry
- Bank Janardhan

== Production ==
This film marks the second film of television anchor-turned-actor Anand. Ramya Barna plays a music teacher in the film.

== Soundtrack ==
Nannedeya Haadu

Soundtrack album by A T Raveesh
- Released: 29 March 2009
- Genre: Feature film soundtrack
- Length: 36:03
- Language: Kannada
- Label: Anand Audio

A T Raveesh chronology
Seena (2009)	Nannedeya Haadu (2009)	Preethiyinda Ramesh (2010)
External audio
- Nannedeya Haadu – Jukebox on YouTube

The soundtrack was composed by A T Raveesh.

Track listing
No.	Title	Lyrics	Singer(s)	Length
1.	"Heegeko Kane"	Venugopal	Rajesh Krishnan, Priyadarshini	6:11
2.	"Ninna Preethiyonde Nanage"	Umashankar	Kunal Ganjawala, Anuradha Bhat	6:24
3.	"Yeranneri Holev"	Sridhar Koteshwara	K. S. Chithra	5:18
4.	"Usiru Hogo"	Guruvendra	Rajesh Krishnan	0:48
5.	"Yarado Shapa"	Umashankar	Guruvendra	0:48
6.	"Ranganayaka"	Purandara Dasaru	Anuradha Bhat	2:03
7.	"Nannusire Nannusire"	Umashankar	Guruvendra	4:47
8.	"Kanninali Sanneyal"	Sridhar Koteshwara	Nanditha	4:43
9.	"Kallina Koli"	V. Manohar	C. Ashwath, Hemanth, Sathish	5:01
Total length:				36:03

== Reception ==
A critic from Bangalore Mirror wrote that "Director Guruvendra has a decent story in hand but his story telling ways are compromises of convenience, almost killing the film" A critic from Deccan Herald wrote that "A decent story is spoilt by narration that reeks of inexperience, lack of confidence and loads of compromises". On the contrary, a critic from The Times of India rated the film three out of fives tars and wrote that "This one's a musical love story brilliantly presented by director Guruvendra with an excellent script, neat narration and good command over sequences. Though the opening has loose ends, the director gradually, takes control of the story and keeps up the momentum".
