= Photographer (2006 film) =

- Directed by: Ranjan Pramod
- Written by: Ranjan Pramod
- Produced by: Houli Pottoor
- Starring: Mohanlal; Neethu; Master Mani; Biju Menon
- Cinematography: Alagappan N.
- Edited by: Jyothy
- Music by: Johnson
- Production company: Dream Team Productions
- Distributed by: Dream Team Release
- Release date: 21 October 2006
- Running time: 147 minutes
- Country: India
- Language: Malayalam

Photographer is a 2006 Indian Malayalam-language drama film written and directed by Ranjan Pramod(in his directorial debut). Starring Mohanlal, Neethu, Master Mani and Biju Menon in lead roles. The film is loosely based on the Muthanga incident of 2003, in which a policeman and a tribal were killed. Mohanlal plays dual roles as a wildlife photographer and a farmer. The soundtrack was composed by Johnson.

The film marks the debut of Kannada actress Neethu in Malayalam cinema, as well as the comeback of composer Johnson after a sabbatical. Photographer was released on 21 October 2006 on the occasion of Diwali. Mani, who played the role of a tribal boy won the Kerala State Film Award for Best Child Artist. Johnson won the Mathrubhumi Film Award for Best Music Director for the soundtrack and Mullasserry Raju Music Award for the song "Enthe Kannanu".

== Cast ==
- Mohanlal in a dual role as:
  - Dijo John (Photographer)
  - Joy John (Planter)
- Bharathi Vishnuvardhan as Dijo's and Joy's mother
- Neethu as Sathyavathi, Dijo's wife
- Master Mani as Thammi, a tribal child
- Biju Menon as Forest Minister Hariharan
- Master Sougandh as Sharan
- Saranya Bhagyaraj as Asha
- Venu Nagavalli as Chief Minister
- Manoj K. Jayan as Circle Inspector Hareesh Chandran Nair
- Ramachandran as Jose John (Dijo's and Joy's Elder Brother)
- Mammukoya as Teastall owner Hassanikka
- K. B. Ganesh Kumar as Ananthan
- Murali as Viplavam Balan
- Ambika Mohan as Balan's wife
- Daniel Balaji as S.I.T officer
- Janaki Sabesh as John's sister-in-law

== Production ==
The film is loosely based on the Muthanga incident of 2003, in which a policeman and a tribal were killed. The film marks the directorial debut of screenwriter Ranjan Pramod. Filming began in July 2006. The film was also the debut of Kannada actress Neethu in Malayalam cinema, as well as the comeback of composer Johnson after a sabbatical. Mani, a real tribal boy played, a tribal character in the film.

== Soundtrack ==
The original songs featured in the film was composed by Johnson, with lyrics by Kaithapram Damodaran. Soundtrack album was released by the label Satyam Audios.

Photographer
No.	Title	Singer(s)	Length
1.	"Enthe Kannanu" (Version 1)	K. J. Yesudas	4:45
2.	"Pulchadi"	Vaisali	3:44
3.	"Chandrika Raavil"	Vijeesh Goplal, Gayatri Asokan	4:47
4.	"Vasantharaavil"	Sujatha Mohan	4:55
5.	"Poopuzhayil"	Vijay Yesudas	4:30
6.	"Kadlolam"	K. S. Chithra	4:56
7.	"Enthe Kannanu" (Version 2)	Manjari	4:45

== Release ==
Photographer was released in theatres on 24 October 2006.

== Awards ==
Master Mani won the Kerala State Film Award for Best Child Artist. Johnson won the Mathrubhumi Film Award for Best Music Director for the soundtrack and the Mullasserry Raju Music Award for the song "Enthe Kannanu".
