= Jai Hind (2012 film) =

2012 film by Venugopal

- Theatrical Release Poster
- Directed by: Venugopal
- Written by: United Mohan (dialogue)
- Screenplay by: Srinivas Pujar
- Story by: Srinivas Pujar
- Produced by: Srinivas Pujar
- Starring: Sandesh Pujar; Pooja Gandhi
- Music by: Vikram - Siddeshwar; Krishnavardhan Kulkarni
- Production company: Om Sai Productions
- Release date: 14 September 2012
- Running time: 141 minutes
- Country: India
- Language: Kannada

Jai Hind (transl. Victory to India) is a 2012 Indian Kannada-language war film directed by Venugopal, starring Pooja Gandhi and Sandesh. The film is produced by Srinivas Pujar under the banner of Om Sai Production.

== Plot ==
This is a single handed war on terrorism. Commando in the Indian Army Bharath considers his nation as his mother. He does not want anyone to cut it like piece of cake. He is very strong and stubborn in his decision.

Captain Bharath is Salim, Captain Bharath is Jai Hind. In his first assignment to trace or trash the terrorist operation he round off terrorist Masood and hand over to the government of India. He gets Shourya Chakra for it. In a short span of time Masood is freed on a hijack of an Indian Air plane with Rs. 2 billion demand set by terrorist gang.

Feeling ashamed of this, Captain Bharath in his second assignment takes his own decision. He seeks the support of his doctor wife Anjali (Pooja Gandhi) in declaring him as dead. As Salim and as Jai Hind, Captain Bharath now with a clue of terrorist attack in prominent places in Bangalore put an end to terrorist activities and surrenders to the government.

For taking law in to his hand Captain Bharath is sentenced for life imprisonment. The public support Captain Bharath but judiciary is above all.

== Cast ==
- Sandesh as Salim
- Pooja Gandhi as Dr. Anjali
- Ramesh Bhat
- Thriller Manju
- Shobaraj as Sher Khan
- Sathyajith as Chand Bhasha

== Soundtrack ==
The Film's Audio was released on 13 August 2011 in Davanagere's Bapuji Auditorium, along with the Cinema Siri event. Jaihind has five songs, composed by Vikram - Siddeshwar & Krishnavardhan Kulkarni.

Track listing
No.	Title	Lyrics	Music	Singers	Length
1.	"Jayahey Bharata"	Saraswathi Putra	Vikram - Siddeshwar	Hemanth, Sumithra P	4:00
2.	"Beedi Henda"	Saraswathi Putra	Vikram - Siddeshwar	Vikrma Joshi	3:32
3.	"Yekendu Ee Bhaava"	Krishnavardhan Kulkarni	Krishnavardhan Kulkarni	Anupama M.A	5:03
4.	"Chimmi Chimmi"	Krishnavardhan Kulkarni	Krishnavardhan Kulkarni	Rajesh Krishnan and Anupama.M.A	3:57
5.	"Yogi Manege Banda"		Krishnavardhan Kulkarni	Nagachandrika Bhat	6:36

== Reception ==
=== Critical response ===
A critic from The Times of India scored the film at 3 out of 5 stars and says "Full marks to Sandesh for his excellent performance. Pooja Gandhi has done justice to her role. Music by Krishnavarada Kulakarni is good. Suryakantha Honnali has done a good job of cinematography". A critic from News18 India wrote "Cinematography is convincing. The actual Army training places and 'Vandematharam' song are well captured by Suryakanth Honnalli. Krishnavardhana Kulkarni banked on the old popular tunes. One Hindi and one Kannada film tunes he has picked shamelessly". A critic from NDTV wrote "While the camera work of Suryakanth Honnali is better, Krishnavardhan Kulkarni's music is below average. Editing work is also mediocre. Jai Hind has a laudable concept, but poor direction mars the film".
