= Huchchi =

Indian psychological drama film

- VCD cover
- Directed by: Venkatesh Panchangam
- Written by: Giri Panchangam (dialogue)
- Screenplay by: Giri Panchangam
- Story by: Venkatesh Panchangam
- Produced by: Smt Kavitha Kumaraswamy
- Starring: Pooja Gandhi; Anant Nag; Soundarya
- Cinematography: Naveen Suvarna
- Edited by: S Soundar Raj
- Music by: Giri Panchangam
- Production company: Sri Kavithalaya Films
- Release date: 10 October 2009
- Country: India
- Language: Kannada

Huchchi (transl. Mad girl) is a 2009 Indian Kannada-language psychological drama film directed by Venkatesh Panchangam and starring Pooja Gandhi in the titular role, Anant Nag and Soundarya. The film was released to negative reviews.

== Plot ==
Chinnu's babysitter Preethi has acute psychosis after being abused by a rowdy along with her mother, as a child. While staying with Chinnu, Preethi imagines the rowdy and tries to protect Chinnu. Preeti's confused parents think that there actually is a rowdy harming their child. How a psychiatrist fixes the issue in Preethi's mind forms the rest of the story.

== Cast ==
- Pooja Gandhi as Preethi
- Anant Nag as the psychiatrist
- Sudha Rani
- Dharma
- Jayashree
- Baby Pooja
- Thilak Shekar
- Mandeep Roy
- Baby Soundarya as Chinnu

== Production ==
According to Pooja Gandhi, she "realized her dream of acting in the role of a mentally retarded girl". She finished dubbing for her role in four days.

== Reception ==
A critic from Bangalore Mirror wrote that "If you want to watch a scary movie without getting scared, Huchchi is the perfect choice". R. G. Vijayasarathy of Rediff.com rated the film two out of five stars and wrote that "All in all Huchchi is an average fare".
