= Panchamrutha =

- Directed by: T N Nagesh
- Written by: Krish Joshi (dialogue)
- Screenplay by: Krish Joshi
- Story by: T N Nagesh
- Starring: Srinagara Kitty; Devaraj; Raghu Mukherjee; P. Ravi Shankar; Achyuth Kumar; Dileep Raj; Pooja Gandhi; Tara; Neethu; Ramya Barna; Yagna Shetty
- Cinematography: A C Mahinder
- Edited by: Narahalli Jnanesh
- Music by: Ashley–Abhilash
- Production companies: Parvathi Cine Combines; Kokila Creations
- Release date: 12 August 2011
- Country: India
- Language: Kannada

Panchamrutha (transl. Panchamrita) is a 2011 Indian Kannada-language anthology film directed by T N Nagesh starring an ensemble cast of Srinagara Kitty, Devaraj, Raghu Mukherjee, P. Ravi Shankar, Achyuth Kumar, Dileep Raj, Pooja Gandhi, Tara, Neethu, Ramya Barna and Yagna Shetty. The film consists of five stories that are each about twenty to twenty-two minutes long.

== Cast ==
| Kshamaya Dharithri: the forgiveness | Ondu Kanasu: a dream | Droha: a betrayal | Samarasave Jeevana: harmonious life | Nambike: trust |
|---|---|---|---|---|
| Pooja Gandhi as Preethi; Raghu Mukherjee as Vasi; Sudha Belawadi | Achyuth Kumar as Seetharam a.k.a. Seetha; Tara as Shanthi; R. G. Vijayasarathy as Seetharam's supervisor | Likith Shetty as Raghu; Ramya Barna as Navya; Padmaja Rao as Meenakshi | Neethu as Tanmayi a.k.a. Tanu; Dileep Raj as Manohar a.k.a. Manu; Ravishankar Gowda as Aditya | Srinagara Kitty as Purushottam Lakshmi Solanki; Yagna Shetty as Lakshmi; Devaraj as Gagan's father; Yathiraj as Vinay |

== Soundtrack ==
The music was composed by Ashley–Abhilash and written by V. Nagendra Prasad and Nagesh.

Track listing
| No. | Title | Singer(s) | Length |
|---|---|---|---|
| 1. | "Hoo Male" | Sujay Harthi | 1:17 |
| 2. | "Bul Bul" | Joel Dubba, Rohith | 1:35 |
| 3. | "Nann Usire" | Ritish Padmanabhan | 1:10 |
| 4. | "Sachin Tendulkar" | Joel Dubba | 3:38 |
| 5. | "Dharani Mondala" | Ritish Padmanabhan | 3:08 |
| 6. | "Prathi Jannamku" | Joel Dubba | 1:10 |
| 7. | "Suriya Baruvanu" | Joel Dubba | 1:03 |
| 8. | "Hrudaya" | Sharanyya Sharan | 1:33 |
| Total length: | | | 14:34 |

== Reception ==
A critic from The Times of India wrote that "A good effort by director TN Nagesh who has selected six stories which cater to all age groups". A critic from IANS wrote that "Panchamrutha is good, but it is a failed experiment".
