= Aithalakkadi =

2010 Indian film directed by J.G. Krishna

- Film poster
- Directed by: J.G. Krishna
- Written by: J.G. Krishna
- Produced by: M.G. Ramamurthy
- Starring: Rangayana Raghu; Bullet Prakash
- Cinematography: J.G. Krishna
- Edited by: R.D. Ravi
- Music by: Sadhu Kokila
- Release date: 4 June 2010
- Country: India
- Language: Kannada

Aithalakkadi is a 2010 Indian Kannada-language comedy film directed by J.G. Krishna. The film stars Rangayana Raghu and Bullet Prakash in the lead roles. The music of the film was composed by Sadhu Kokila.

== Cast ==
- Rangayana Raghu as Raghu
- Bullet Prakash as Prakasha
- Sangeetha as Raghu's wife
- Neethu
- Bullet Prakash
- Sadhu Kokila
- Shobaraj
- Padmaja Rao
- Girija Lokesh
- Dingri Nagaraj
- Vaijanath Biradar
- Sharan
- Honnavalli Krishna
- Thriller Manju
- M. S. Umesh
- Karibasavaiah
- Malavalli Saikrishna
- Bank Janardhan
- Kuri Prathap
- Shille Manjunath

Guest appearances

- V. Ravichandran
- Jaggesh
- Sudeep
- Duniya Vijay
- Vijay Raghavendra

== Soundtrack ==
The music for the film was composed by Sadhu Kokila.

Aithalakkadi

Soundtrack album by Sadhu Kokila
- Released: 2010
- Genre: Feature film soundtrack
- Length: 24:17
- Language: Kannada
- Producer: Sadhu Kokila

Sadhu Kokila chronology
Jaaji Mallige (2009)	Aithalakkadi (2010)	Hendtheer Darbar (2010)

Track listing
No.	Title	Lyrics	Singer(s)	Length
1.	"Aithalakkadi"	J. G. Krishna	Hemanth Kumar, Sadhu Kokila, Rangayana Raghu	4:25
2.	"Baa Baaro Byragi"	J. G. Krishna	Chaitra H. G.	4:26
3.	"Hollywood"	J. G. Krishna	Tippu	4:37
4.	"Huduga"	J. G. Krishna	Gururaj Hoskote	2:27
5.	"Naanu Neenu Onde"	J. G. Krishna	Karthik	4:25
6.	"Sangappa Sangappa"	J. G. Krishna	Hemanth Kumar, Anuradha Bhat	3:57
Total length:				24:17

== Reception ==
=== Critical response ===
A critic from The Times of India scored the film at 3 out of 5 stars and says "While Rangayana Raghu is simply superb, Bullet Prakash excels. Sadhu Kokila's role as film director keeps you in good humour. Neethu is a treat to watch in the role of Sevanthi. Music by Sadhu Kokila is okay". Shruti Indira Lakshminarayana of Rediff.com scored the film at 1.5 out of 5 stars and says "The hurried climax in which Vijay Raghavendra appears is also unjustified. Some more time could have been dedicated to Bullet Prakash's flashback track. Sadu Kokhila's music has nothing much to offer either. The film rests on an interesting story line, if only the narrative backed the plot". A critic from Deccan Herald wrote "The same time could have been spent better on developing the track involving Prakash. Indeed, the climax looks a little out of place with hurried placements etc. Still, the film appeals on a basic level with each actor pitching in realistic performances. Sadhu Kokila’s comedy track is an example of how jaded humour can also evoke at least a tired giggle. Choreography and action sequences are “mast-mast” ".
