= Kodagana Koli Nungitha =

- Directed by: Victory Vasu
- Screenplay by: Victory Vasu; Shivasamay
- Produced by: K. R. Ramaiah; H C Balakrishna (presents)
- Starring: Jaggesh; Pooja Gandhi
- Cinematography: Dasari Seenu
- Edited by: S K Nagendra Urs; Pradeep KGF
- Music by: Sadhu Kokila
- Production company: G M Films
- Release date: 14 November 2008
- Country: India
- Language: Kannada

Kodagana Koli Nungitha (transl. Did the hen swallow the monkey?) is a 2008 Indian Kannada-language romantic comedy film directed by Victory Vasu and starring Jaggesh and Pooja Gandhi. The film is a remake of the 2004 Telugu film Malliswari, and its title is based on Shishunala Sharif's folk song.

== Cast ==
- Jaggesh as Balasubramanya
- Pooja Gandhi as Lakshmi
- Rangayana Raghu as Melukote
- Sharan
- Sadhu Kokila
- R. N. Sudarshan
- Sanketh Kashi
- Sihi Kahi Chandru
- Bank Janardhan
- Nagashekar
- Chitra Shenoy
- Padma Vasanthi
- Kote Prabhakar
- Kunigal Nagabhushan
- Mandeep Roy
- Bullet Prakash
- M. S. Umesh
- Honnavalli Krishna
- Killer Venkatesh

== Soundtrack ==
The music is composed by Sadhu Kokila with lyrics written by Ram Narayan. The song "Ringana Ringana Nota" is based off "Yeh Chaand Sa Roshan Chehra" from Kashmir Ki Kali (1964).

Track listing
No.	Title	Singer(s)	Length
1.	"Evattu Evattu"	Hemanth, Nanditha	4:23
2.	"Maaya Naa Maaya"	Malgudi Subha	4:15
3.	"Ninge Kane Ninge Kane"	Karthik, Nanditha	3:34
4.	"Ringana Ringana Nota"	Rajesh Krishnan, Anuradha Sriram	4:34
5.	"Yedu Kondala Vasa"	Rajesh Krishnan	4:09
Total length:			20:55

== Reception ==
A critic from the Bangalore Mirror wrote, "The story has ample scope for comic situations. But the many characters become too much to bear with their comic antics actually turning out to be irritating". A critic from Sify wrote, "The narration is protracted and just for the heck of comedy the scenes appear on the screen that does not jell with the story line". A critic from IANS wrote, Kodagaana Koli Nungiththa has its comic moments, but overall the film is a weak presentation with too many illogical sequences thrown in".
