= Mathiya Chennai =

- Poster
- Directed by: Vivekanand-Veerasingam
- Produced by: Rajesh J. Chandan
- Starring: Jaivanth; Ramya Barna; Prakash Raj; Sangeetha; Mahadevan
- Cinematography: SV
- Edited by: Arvin
- Music by: Ilaiyaraaja
- Production company: Raaptor Media Films
- Release date: 27 November 2009
- Country: India
- Language: Tamil

Mathiya Chennai (transl. Central Chennai) is a 2009 Indian Tamil-language film directed by Vivekanand and Veerasingam. Produced by Rajesh J. Chandan, the film stars Jaivanth and Ramya Barna, while Prakash Raj, Sangeetha, Mahadevan, and Ganja Karuppu play supporting roles. The music was composed by Ilaiyaraaja. The film released on 27 November 2009.

== Plot ==
Saravanan loves films and dreams of becoming a director, but he accidentally gets in a brawl with a gangster, making his future difficult. However, Saravanan is in love with the gangster's daughter Maha. Later, Saravanan makes a movie with the help of Maha, but when the film is about to release, the gangster pulls out all the stops to prevent the film from screening.

== Cast ==
- Jaivanth as Saravanan
- Ramya Barna as Maha
- Prakash Raj
- Sangeetha
- Mahadevan
- Ganja Karuppu as Madurai
- Charle
- Shanmugarajan
- Ragasya
- Pooja
- Vadivukkarasi
- Manikka Vinayagam
- Sathya
- Nellai Siva
- Periya Karuppu Thevar
- O. A. K. Sundar
- Sangu Ravi
- Cutting Ganesh
- Shankar G. Kumar
- M. Sivaguru
- Hemalatha
- Vishalini
- R. Sindhu
- Sheela
- Jiya

== Soundtrack ==
The music composed by Ilayaraja. The audio launch was held in at Kamala Theatre, Chennai. Rediff wrote "In fact, that's something that's valid for the whole album -- in many ways, its trademark Ilayaraja of olden times, minus the musical feats that some of his classic usually contain. Perhaps that might be a direct result of the project itself; this collection works best if you're a diehard fan". Milliblog called it "decent enough soundtrack".

Song	Singers	Lyrics
"Elaikku Intha"	Ilaiyaraaja	Mu. Metha
"Ennda Dai"	Tippu, Vijay Yesudas, Rahul Nambiar	Vaali
"Ilavayasu Pasanga"	Tippu, Vijay Yesudas, Rahul Nambiar	Na. Muthukumar
"Sullikuppam Ganapathy"	Tippu, Vijay Yesudas, Rahul Nambiar	Muthulingam
"Un Vaazhve"	Sadhana Sargam	Vaali
"Unnai Patri Sonnaal"	Rita	Palani Bharathi

== Critical reception ==
A critic from Koodal that if more attention had been paid to the screenplay, the entire film could have been enjoyed. S. R. Ashok Kumar of The Hindu wrote, "The dialogues are powerful. Karthik Raja's camera work is commendable. You can't help but wonder why editor D.S.R. Subash has not scissored some of the unwanted scenes".
