= Mungaru Male =

- Film Poster
- Directed by: Yograj Bhat
- Written by: Yogaraj Bhat; Preetam Gubbi
- Produced by: E. Krishna
- Starring: Ganesh; Pooja Gandhi
- Cinematography: S. Krishna
- Edited by: Deepu S. Kumar
- Music by: Mano Murthy
- Production company: E. K. Entertainers
- Distributed by: Jayanna; Bhogendra
- Release date: 29 December 2006
- Running time: 132 minutes
- Country: India
- Language: Kannada
- Budget: ₹70 Lakhs
- Box office: ₹70–75 crore (Note: Multiple references:) (Note: Industry sources indicated an approximate gross of ₹50 crore for Mungaru Male, whereas the higher ₹75 crore figure was attributed to the critic Prahlad Rao Financial claims made by primary sources (directors, producers, distributors, actors) should be treated with circumspection, as primary sources often have conflicts of interest and incentives to inflate box office figures.)

Mungaru Male ( transl. Pre-monsoon rain) is a 2006 Indian Kannada-language romantic drama film co-written and directed by Yogaraj Bhat, and produced by E. Krishnappa. It stars Ganesh, Pooja Gandhi and Anant Nag. The film is believed to have shaped and strengthened the careers of Ganesh, Pooja Gandhi, Yograj Bhat, lyricist Jayant Kaikini, choreographers A. Harsha and Imran Sardhariya and composer Mano Murthy, and made Bollywood playback singers Sonu Nigam, Kunal Ganjawala and Udit Narayan popular in Karnataka.

It was the first film in India (for any language) to be screened continuously for over one year in a multiplex, and holds the record for the longest-running film at a multiplex in addition to having one of the highest recorded box-office collections in Kannada cinema. According to the Bangalore Mirror, it was the first Kannada film to cross the ₹50 crore box office collection mark. The film collected an estimated ₹75 crore. The Income Tax department alleged that the movie had collected ₹67.5 crore (US$7.2 million) and demanded tax on that amount. It ran for a record 460 days at the PVR Multiplex. It also holds a national record in Indian Cinema for running more than one year in PVR.

It was remade in Telugu as Vaana, in Bengali as Premer Kahini (both in 2008), in Odia as Romeo - The Lover Boy in 2009 and in Marathi as Premay Namaha in 2017. A spiritual sequel to the film, titled Mungaru Male 2, was released in 2016.

== Plot ==
Preetham is on a visit to Eva Mall in Bengaluru where amidst heavy winds, he spots a pretty girl Nandini. While staring at her, he inadvertently falls into a manhole. Nandini rescues him, but in the process she loses her heart-shaped watch which she had just bought.

While accompanying his mother to Madikeri in Coorg, Preetham confronts a man named Jaanu. Jaanu, who has been following Nandini, hits Preetham, thinking that he is in love with her. Preetham, unaware that Jaanu has vowed not to allow anyone near Nandini, fights Jaanu and his gang in revenge.

In Madikeri, Preetham unexpectedly meets Nandini. He identifies himself and expresses his love for her and offers to put her lost watch on her. Nandini, who is already engaged, rejects his request. Nonetheless, Preetham vows to marry Nandini if she meets him again. In the meantime, Preetham discovers that his nearly-deaf host in Madikeri, Col. Subbaiah, is Nandini's father and that her wedding is only a week away. Dejected, Preetham throws Nandini's watch away. But Nandini calls him and taunts him to return. Delighted, Preetham goes in search of her watch and spots a rabbit, which he names Devadas and brings it along with the watch.

Preetham takes Nandini to the railway station to receive her friends who are due to arrive from Mumbai for the wedding. The train is delayed by five hours, so Nandini and Preetham decide to visit a nearby hill-temple. While returning from the temple, Preetham and Nandini are caught in the rain. An old couple offers to give them shelter inside their hut. Preetham, still not sure about expressing his love to Nandini, grabs a couple of toddy bottles, goes out in the rain and starts drinking. However, when Nandini walks towards him, offering an umbrella, he drunkenly tells Nandini that he should stay away from Nandini to remain a decent boy, rather than to propose or elope with her. Nandini is now in love with Preetham and is in a dilemma as her wedding is in a few days. She asks him to take her to the top of a waterfall where she expresses her love for him while standing at the edge.

Preetam, intent on marrying Nandini, takes Col. Subbaiah for a morning jog to discuss the matter. But Col. Subbaiah, a heart patient, tells Preetham that he is expected to die anytime and his only desire is to get Nandini married to Gautam, an army officer who saved his life during a war. He also could feel Nandini's mother's worry when she realises that Nandini could be in love with someone else because the wedding is the next day and all invitations have already been sent out. Her mother also feels that it would be very unfair to a good person like Gautham. Hence, Preetham decides to obey Nandini's parents' wishes and let Gautham marry Nandini. The night before the wedding, an extremely depressed Preetham goes to a roadside bar to drink alcohol and sees Gautam arriving for his wedding ceremony. Gautam asks the bar owner for an alternate route to Col. Subbaiah's home, as heavy rains have caused a tree to fall and block the road. Jaanu arrives and tries to kill Gautam, Preetham saves him and convinces Jaanu that Gautam is the best person to marry Nandini.

The next day, Preetham brings Gautam to the wedding after Gautam's car breaks down. They reach just in time for the ceremony, but Preetham declines to attend. Gautam asks for the heart-shaped watch as a memento but Preetham leaves, unwilling to part with it. They search for Preetham, but cannot find him. Only Preetham's mother knows the truth of his love for Nandini, and she tries to hide her fear.

Resignedly, Preetham watches the arch proclaiming "Gautham weds Nandini" and the marriage taking place in Kodava style. As he leaves, he spots Devadas and takes the rabbit with him. Driving towards Bangalore, Preetham confides in Devadas as to how much he loved Nandini and how he wished he had a life with her. He then realises that Devadas has died. The film ends with Preetham burying Devadas.

== Cast ==
- Ganesh as Preetam
- Pooja Gandhi as Nandini, Preetam's love interest
- Ananth Nag as Colonel Subbaiah, Nandini's father
- Padmaja Rao as "Bubbly" Babita, Nandini's mother
- Jai Jagadish as Preetam's father
- Sudha Belawadi as Kamala, Preetam's mother
- Diganth as Gautam, Nandini's fiancé
- Neenasam Ashwath as Jolly
- Sanchita Shetty as Nandini's friend

== Production ==
=== Development ===
Director Yograj Bhat, who had earlier dabbled in advertising and corporate films, began working on the script of Mungaru Male. He read the script to Puneeth Rajkumar and Ramya who rejected it. Ganesh introduced Yograj Bhat to producer E. Krishnappa, who agreed to finance the film. Bhat cast a relatively unknown actress, Pooja Gandhi, for the lead female role in the film.

=== Filming ===
Approximately 80% of the scenes were filmed in the rain. Shooting locations included major part in Sakaleshpura, Madikeri, Jog Falls Sagara, and Gadag. Krishna, the cameraman, was a part-time photographer prior to the film. The song "Kunidu Kunidu" and the climax was shot at Jog Falls.

== Soundtrack ==
Mungaru Male

Soundtrack album by Mano Murthy
- Released: 6 November 2006
- Recorded: 2006
- Genre: Feature film soundtrack
- Length: 31:30
- Label: Anand Audio
- Producers: Mano Murthy, Sunny

Mano Murthy chronology
Amrithadhare (2005)	Mungaru Male (2006)	Cheluvina Chittara (2007)

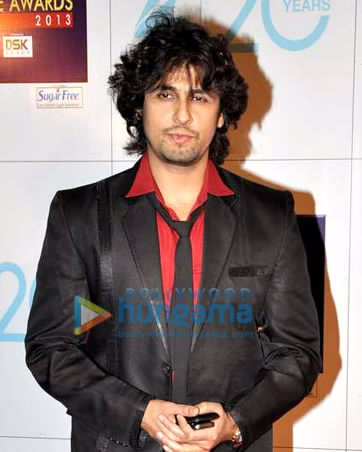
Anisutide song sung by Sonu Nigam

Mano Murthy scored the film's background music and its soundtrack, lyrics for which was penned by Jayant Kaikini, Yogaraj Bhat, Kaviraj and Hrudaya Shiva. The soundtrack album consists of seven tracks. Anand Audio bought the distribution rights for ₹500,000. It was released on 6 November 2006 in Bangalore.

Upon the album's release, it topped the charts with the song "Anisuthide" receiving significant radio and TV air time. It was reported that by mid-May 2007, over 200,000 copies were sold in compact discs alone. Hindustan Times reported, "The film has just completed seven weeks, but audio sales have broken all earlier records. Composer Mano Murthy has once again created musical magic with songs like 'Anisuthidhe' and 'Onde Ondu Saari'."

Track list
No.	Title	Lyrics	Singer(s)	Length
1.	"Onde Ondu Saari (produced by Sunny)"	Kaviraj	Kunal Ganjawala, Priya Himesh	4:32
2.	"Mungaru Maleye"	Yogaraj Bhat	Sonu Nigam	4:49
3.	"Kunidu Kunidu Baare"	Jayant Kaikini	Udit Narayan, Sunidhi Chauhan, Stephen	4:30
4.	"Anisuthide"	Jayant Kaikini	Sonu Nigam	4:36
5.	"Suvvi Suvvali"	Hrudaya Shiva	Hemanth	4:38
6.	"Ivanu Geleyanalla"	Hrudaya Shiva	Shreya Ghoshal	3:47
7.	"Araluthiru Jeevada Geleya"	Jayant Kaikini	Shreya Ghoshal	4:38
Total length:				31:30

The success of the film's soundtrack, especially the track "Anisutide", further propelled Nigam's playback singing career in Kannada cinema. With the song, lyricist and writer Jayant Kaikini's reputation as a writer of romantic songs further elevated, and is considered one of his best.

== Critical response ==
Rediff.com's critic awarded it a three-star rating and praised its cinematography, technical values, and the acting of Ganesh and Anant Nag.

Indicine.com's critic rated the film 4 out of 5, describing Ganesh as the "life and soul of the movie". Other praise was directed at Gandhi, "Sanjana makes a confident debut. Veteran actor Anant Nag with his brilliant comic timing provides able support". S. Shiva Kumar of The Hindu wrote, "Anant Nag never ceases to amaze. Playing a deaf, trigger-happy ex-serviceman, his dialogue delivery and sense of timing are spot on. TV anchor turned actor Ganesh has a casual style, which audiences seem to be lapping up."

== Box office ==
Made with a production budget of ₹70 lakh (US$75,000), the film collected ₹50 crore (500 million) in 300 days. Then film went on to gross ₹50–75 crore (₹500–750 million) by the end of its theatrical run. The film has also been released with 150 prints in Karnataka. This was the first Indian film ever which ran for over a year in a multiplex: PVR cinemas Bangalore. Mungaaru Male was being screened at full theatres, one year after its release. According to reports it was the first Kannada film to touch ₹50 crore club in history of Kannada film industry.

=== Overseas ===
Mungaru Male was released to 10 countries including the United States, Australia, Singapore, New Zealand, UK, Hong Kong and Dubai. It was the highest-grossing Kannada film overseas. It had made ₹36 lakh (equivalent to ₹1.3 crore or US$130,000 in 2026) in the US alone.

=== Home media ===
The satellite rights were acquired by television channel Star Suvarna for ₹36 million. The DVD of the film with 5.1 surround sound was distributed by Anand Video.

== Awards and nominations ==
The film was awarded the Best Kannada Film award for the year 2006–07 by the Government of Karnataka (seven awards in total from the Government of Karnataka). It won three Filmfare awards: best music, best direction and best film. However, it did not win a single national award from the Indian government.

Awards and nominations
Award	Wins	Nominations
Filmfare Awards South	1	6
Karnataka State Film Awards	7	7
- Totals
Awards won	8
Nominations	13

Ceremony	Category	Nominee	Result	Ref.
Karnataka State Award	Best Film	Mungaru Male	Won	
Karnataka State Award	Best Director	Yogaraj Bhat	Won	
Karnataka State Award	Best Dialogue Writer	Yogaraj Bhat	Won	
Karnataka State Award	Best Cinematographer	S. Krishna	Won	
Karnataka State Award	Best Music Director	Mano Murthy	Won	
Karnataka State Award	Best Sound Recording	Tukaram	Won	
Karnataka State Award	Best Lyricist	Jayanth Kaikini	Won	
54th Filmfare Awards South	Best Director	Yogaraj Bhat	Nominated	
54th Filmfare Awards South	Best film	Mungaru Male	Won	
54th Filmfare Awards South	Best Playback Singer – Male	Sonu Nigam	Nominated	
54th Filmfare Awards South	Best Actor	Ganesh	Nominated	
54th Filmfare Awards South	Best Debut Actress	Pooja Gandhi	Nominated	
54th Filmfare Awards South	Best Playback Singer – Female	Shreya Ghoshal	Nominated	

== Legacy ==
The success of Mungaru Male turned Ganesh and Pooja Gandhi into most sought-after actors in Kannada cinema. Ganesh had back-to-back commercial successes in Cheluvina Chittara (2007), Hudugaata (2007) and Krishna (2007). Ganesh and Bhat delivered two consecutive films that emerged as commercial successes, the other being Gaalipata (2008). The film also proved to be a launchpad for the career of actress Pooja Gandhi. Gandhi also delivered back-to-back commercially superhit films such as Milana (2007), Krishna (2007), Taj Mahal (2008) and Budhivanta (2008). Jog Falls attained popularity and became a tourist spot after the film's release.

Producer E Krishnappa and distributor Jayanna were raided by the Income Tax department multiple times, who claimed that the film had collected ₹67.5 crore and demanded tax for that amount. After Mungaru Male, two of Ganesh's next films also became super hits.

=== Book ===
Bhat wrote about the making of Mungaru Male in the book Haage Summane, which was released on day of the silver jubilee celebration for the movie.

== Remakes ==
The movie was remade in Telugu in 2008 as Vaana, in Bengali in 2008 as Premer Kahini (with a different climax), in Odia in 2009 as Romeo - The Lover Boy and in Marathi in 2017 as Premay Namaha.

== Sequel ==
It was announced in July 2014 that Shashank would be directing the sequel of the film, titled Mungaru Male 2. Ganesh reprised his role in the film, produced by J. Gangadhar under the banner of E. K. Pictures. The sequel was released in 2016.
