= Maharshi (2008 film) =

- VCD cover
- Directed by: Krishna Brahma
- Written by: Krishna Brahma
- Produced by: Ramakrishna
- Starring: Prashanth; Pooja Gandhi
- Cinematography: Ramesh
- Edited by: K. Eshwar
- Music by: Sree Murali
- Production company: Manasa Chithra
- Release date: 14 November 2008
- Country: India
- Language: Kannada

Maharshi is a 2008 Indian Kannada-language action drama film directed by Krishna Brahma and starring Prashanth and Pooja Gandhi. The film was a box office failure.

== Cast ==
- Prashanth as Maharshi
- Pooja Gandhi as Manasa Veena
- Priyanka Chandra
- Harish Rai
- Muni

== Production ==
Krishna Brahma worked as an associate director to Ram Gopal Varma. This is Prashanth's second film after Orata I Love You (2007). A song was shot in the Dakshina Kannada and Udupi districts.

== Soundtrack ==
The music was composed by Sree Murali. The songs were released under the Jhankar Music label.

Track listing
No.	Title	Singer(s)	Length
1.	"Kannali Nee Tumbiruve"	Kunal Ganjawala, Nanditha	4:49
2.	"Kalyana Rekhe"	Udit Narayan, K. S. Chithra	4:36
3.	"Saisiya"	Rajesh Krishnan, Apoorva Sridhar	4:36
4.	"Yaroo Yaroo"	Chetan Sosca	2:55
5.	"Baaro Macha"	Priya Ramesh	4:23
Total length:			21:19

== Reception ==
R. G. Vijayasarathy of Rediff.com wrote that the film "is not only an extreme violent action drama without a credible story, but a perfect example of a thoroughly incompetent and boring venture can still be made". A critic from IANS wrote that "Within half-an-hour of viewing, it becomes clear that one has two more hours of torturous narration and a badly handled illogical story".
