= Zameen Se Aassman Tak =

- Genre: Drama
- Created by: AK Films
- Written by: Shashi Mittal; Sumeet Hukamchand Mittal
- Directed by: Ashok Gaikwad; Aruna Irani; Santosh Bhatt
- Starring: see below
- Country of origin: India
- Original language: Hindi
- No. of seasons: 1
- No. of episodes: 164

Production
- Producer: Aruna Irani
- Camera setup: Multi-camera
- Running time: Approx. 24 minutes

Original release
- Network: Sahara One
- Release: 2 February 2004

Zameen Se Aassman Tak (transl. From the earth to the sky) is a Hindi-language television series on Sahara One. The series follow the story of a family who gets separated by a natural disaster, Earthquake. The series was produced by Aruna Irani.

== Premise ==
The story is of the main protagonist, Balraj Thakur, who gets separated from his wife and daughter in an earthquake tragedy. He tries to find them but can not, and subsequently marries another woman, Meera. The troubles for Balraj Thakur arise when he happens to bump into his real wife one day.

== Cast ==
- Aruna Irani
- Kiran Kumar as Balraj Thakur
- Jividha Sharma / Sangeeta Ghosh
- Anand Suryavanshi
- Sudha Chandran as Meera Balraj Thakur
- Dharmesh Vyas
- Nupur Alankar
- Yash Sinha
- Satyen Kappu
- Rajeev Paul
- Rajeev Verma
- Pooja Gandhi
- Hansika Motwani
- Ravee Gupta
