= Nee Illadhe =

- Directed by: Shiva Ganapathy
- Written by: Shiva Ganapathy
- Produced by: Channapati Nagamalleshwari; Shiva Ganapathy
- Starring: Raghu Mukherjee; Pooja Gandhi
- Cinematography: T. Surendra Reddy
- Edited by: Kemparaj
- Music by: Ashley Mendonca; Abhilash Lakra
- Release date: 25 March 2011
- Running time: 120 minutes
- Country: India
- Language: Kannada

Nee Illadhe (English: Without You) is a 2011 Kannada film in the romance genre starring Raghu Mukherjee and Pooja Gandhi in the lead roles . The film has been directed, co-produced and written by Shiva Ganapathy, Cinematography and project designed by T. Surendra Reddy and produced by Channapati Nagamalleshwari under Ekarudradevi banner. The duo Ashley Mendonca and Abhilash Lakra have composed the music. The film was released on 25 March 2011.

== Plot ==
Pooja Gandhi plays the role of a village girl who comes to city to learn music. Raghu Mukherjee plays the music teacher role. The story revolves around the lives of the teacher and student.

== Cast ==
- Raghu Mukherjee
- Pooja Gandhi
- Bullet Prakash
- Anantha Velu
- Jayalakshmi

== Controversy ==
Pooja Gandhi came under a huge controversial news related to the settlement of her dues for this film with the producers. The controversy reached to a great height when Pooja was banned for 6 months from acting by the Karnataka Film Association.

== Soundtrack ==
Song title	Singers	Lyricist
"Nee Illadhe Baalellidhe"	Joel Dubba, Ritisha Padmanabh	Jhamkandi Shivu
"Hrudayadoorige"	Sujay Harthi	Ananth Narayanan
"Bejaro Bejaru"	Chaitra H. G.	Jhamkandi Shivu
"Tunturu Tunturu"	Ritisha Padmanabh	Ananth Narayanan
"Shake Your Sexy Body"	Sharanya Sharan	Jhamkandi Shivu

== Reception ==
=== Critical response ===
A critic from The Times of India scored the film at 2 out of 5 stars and says "Rest of the movie drags on without any logic, and as expected, has an abrupt end. Except for Pooja Gandhi, and to some extent Raghu Mukherjee, who try their best to lift the movie with their performances, others fail to impress. The movie is an exercise in futile". Shruti Indira Lakshminarayana from Rediff.com scored the film at 1 out of 5 stars and says "The film's music is nothing to boast of either. In fact, an item song picturised in the middle of a mine couldn't have gotten worse. Dialogues are old fashioned and the climax is nothing great either. All in all, Nee Illade has nothing going for it. Here's hoping Pooja and Raghu make better script choices in the future". A critic from The New Indian Express wrote "It would be difficult for the audience to cope with this awkward narration. There is nothing to revel about the music and songs are not up to the mark. All in all, it is not clear what made director Sivaganapathi to come out with this movie that helps neither him nor the artistes and even the audience, who not only pay money to buy the ticket".
