= Pooja Gandhi =

Indian actress

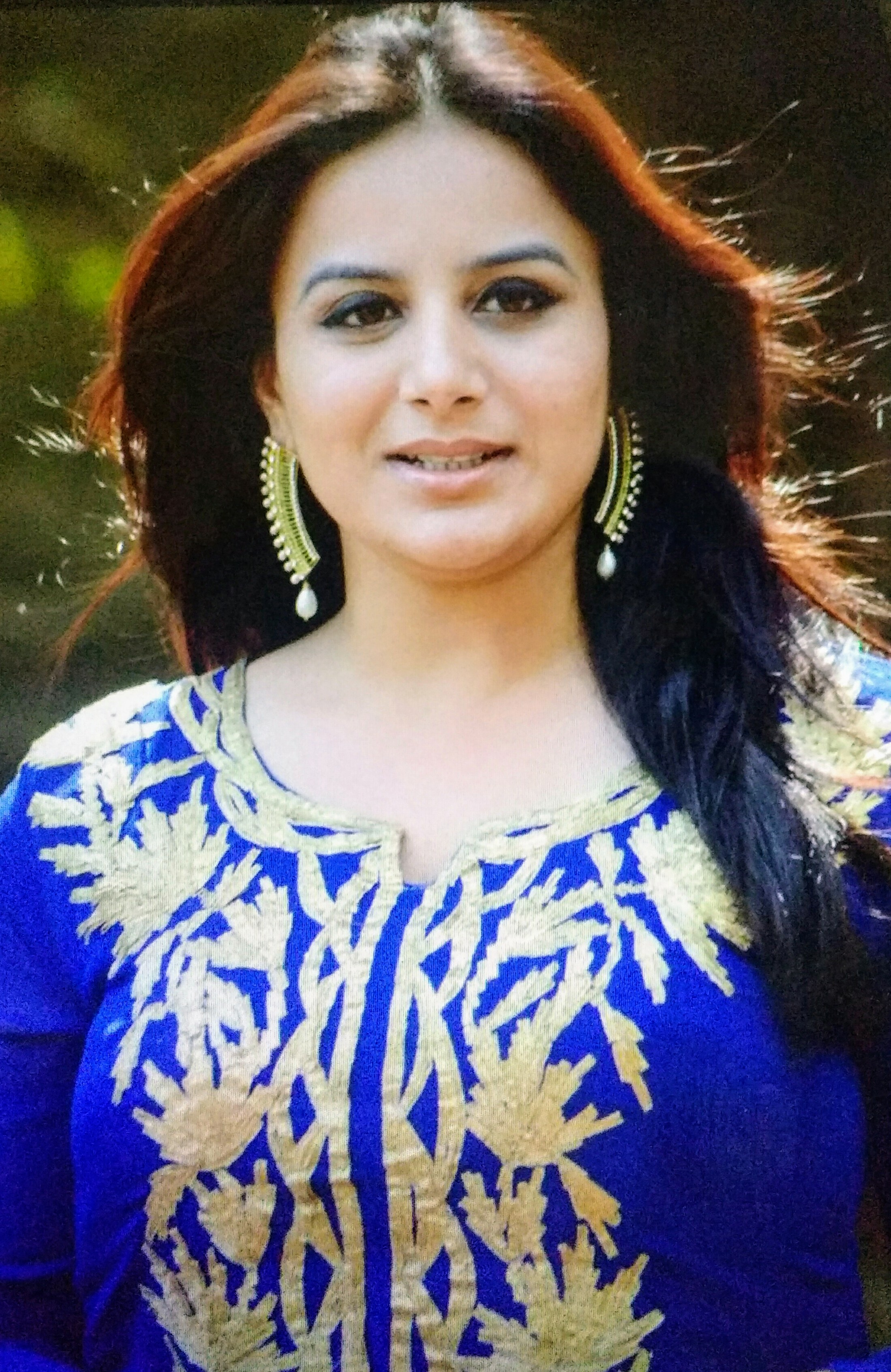
- Born: 7 October 1983 (age 43); Meerut, Uttar Pradesh, India
- Occupations: Actress; politician
- Years active: 2001–present
- Known for: Mungaru Male and Dandupalya
- Political party: Janata Dal (Secular) (2013); Badavara Shramikara Raitara Congress (2013); Karnataka Janata Paksha (2012–13)
- Spouse: Vijay Ghorpade (m. 2023)

Pooja Gandhi is an Indian actress and model who mainly works in Kannada-language films. After starring in the commercially successful 2006 film Mungaru Male, Gandhi became one of the most-popular and highest-paid actresses in Kannada-language films and won several awards, including an honorary doctorate. Gandhi is most-commonly referred to as Male Hudugi (Rain Girl) in the media and the Kannada film industry. Gandhi has acted in over five languages and 50 films in a decade. The Bangalore Times placed her in its list of "25 Most Desirable Women of 2012".

Gandhi made her acting debut in 2001 with the Hindi film Khatron Ke Khiladi opposite Raj Babbar. Since then, she has played lead roles in commercially successful films such as Kokki (2006), Mungaru Male (2006), Milana (2007), Krishna (2007), Taj Mahal (2008), Budhivanta (2008), Anu (2009), Gokula (2009), Dandupalya (2012), Dandupalya 2 (2017) and Dandupalya 3 (2018). Following the success of a series of films, Gandhi established herself as one of Kannada cinema's leading actresses.

In 2012, Gandhi joined the political party Janata Dal (Secular), before joining the KJP party and later the BSR Congress party. She contested the Karnataka assembly elections in the constituency Raichur but failed to win the seat.

In 2016, Gandhi received an honorary doctorate award from the Governing Council of Confederation of International Accreditation Commission (CIAC) in affiliation with KEISIE International University – South Korea, for her contribution to the Kannada film industry.

== Early years and personal life ==
Gandhi was born on 7 October 1983 in Meerut, Uttar Pradesh, India, and was raised in Delhi in a traditional Punjabi family. Her father Pawan Gandhi is a businessman and her mother Jyothi Gandhi is a housewife. Pooja studied at Sophia Convent and Dewan Public School in Meerut. Her younger sisters are Radhika Gandhi, who is also an actress in Kannada films, and Suhani Gandhi, a tennis player. Pooja Gandhi started her career as a model, appearing in advertisements and television series including Awaz – Dil Se Dil Tak – a Hindi-language remake of Lost – and Zameen Se Aassman Tak, which was directed by Aruna Irani.

Gandhi was engaged to the industrialist Anand Gowda in November 2012 and ended the relationship the following month. In 2023, Gandhi married her long-time friend the businessman Vijay Ghorpade in accordance with Kuvempu's Mantra Mangalya concept.

== Career ==
=== Debut (2001) ===
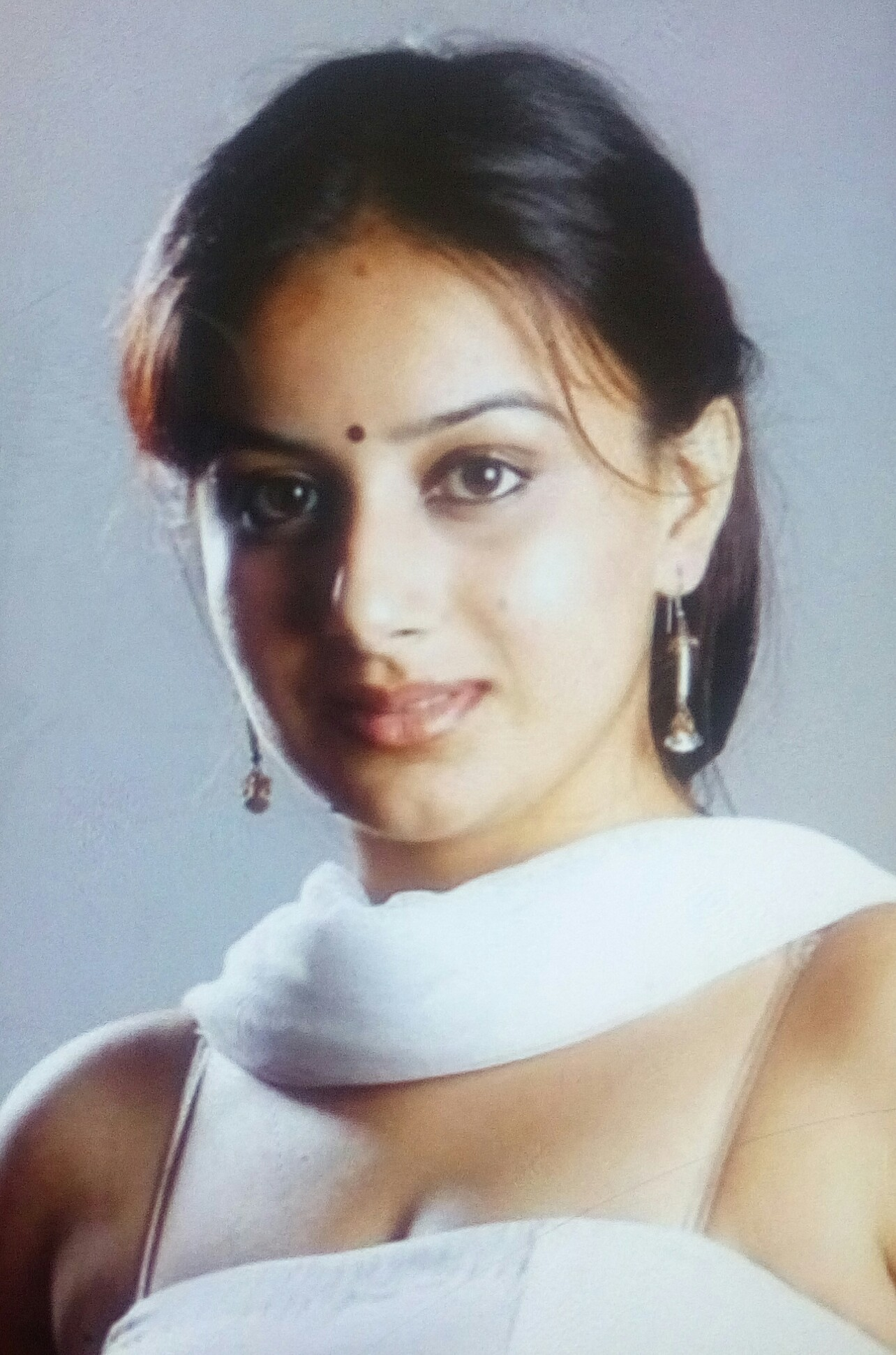
Gandhi during shooting of Tamil film Kokki in 2006

Pooja Gandhi started her acting career in television soap operas, starting with Zameen Se Aassman Tak. Her film debut, at the age of 18, was the Hindi film Khatron Ke Khiladi (2001). Gandhi later appeared in the Bengali film Tomake Salam and in 2003, she moved to the South Indian film industry with the Tamil film Kokki (2006), which received moderate reviews and was successful at the box office.

=== Initial success and fame in Kannada (2006–08) ===
Gandhi's debut in the Kannada film industry was in Mungaru Male, which became the first film in India in any language to be screened continuously for one year in a multiplex, and ultimately ran over 865-days in Karnataka. Mungaru Male collected over ₹75 crore in its theatrical run at the Indian box office, and became the highest-grossing South Indian film during its time of release. Gandhi received praise for her performance as Nandini in the film; Indicine.com's critic stated: "Sanjana makes a confident debut". She then acted in Milana with Puneeth Rajkumar; it was theatrically released on 14 September 2007, gained commercial success and completed a 500-day run in theatres. Milana was dubbed into Malayalam as Ishtam Enikkishtam. In the same year, Gandhi acted in Krishna with her Mungaru Male co-star Ganesh, it was a financial hit at the box office, completing 100-days. It marked the second-consecutive hit of the Ganesh and Gandhi pairing after Mungaru Male. Krishna marked Gandhi's hat-trick 100-day film in her Kannada film career.

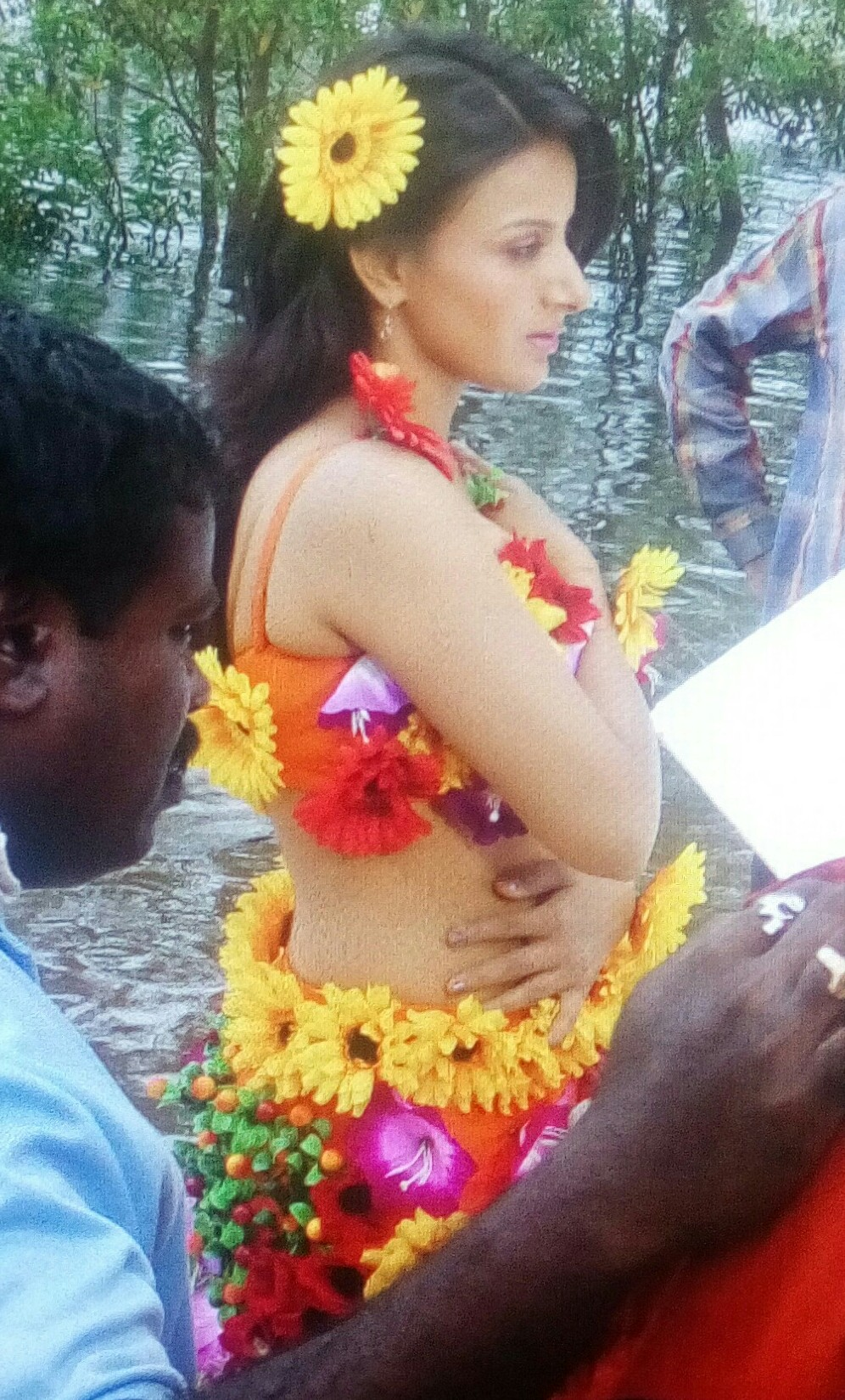
Gandhi during shooting of Mungaru Male film in 2006

In 2008, she starred with Ajay Rao in the financially successful Kannada-language film Taj Mahal, which ran over 200 days in two centres in Karnataka. She was nominated for a Filmfare Best Actress Award; Sify's critic wrote: "Pooja Gandhi looks pretty and has done a good job". Rediff.com editor Vijaysarathy said: "Pooja Gandhi looks stunning and has worked hard to give a strong performance". Her next movie was Budhivanta alongside Upendra; it became the highest-grossing Kannada film of 2008 and completed 100-days in main centres in Karnataka.

=== Series of commercial failures (2009–2011) ===
Gandhi appeared in more than 12 films in several languages, including, Kannada, most of them failed at the box office.

In 2010, Gandhi made her Telugu debut opposite Nandamuri Taraka Ratna and Poorna in Mukkanti, which was a financial failure at the box office.

Also in 2010, Gandhi appeared in her third Hindi film I Am with Juhi Chawla. I Am received mainly positive reviews from critics and audiences upon the theatrical release. The Times of India called it "an important and intelligent film" and The Film Street Journal named it "a must watch". In 2012, I Am won the National Award for Best Hindi Film and Best Lyrics.

=== Critical acclaim and box office success (2012–18) ===
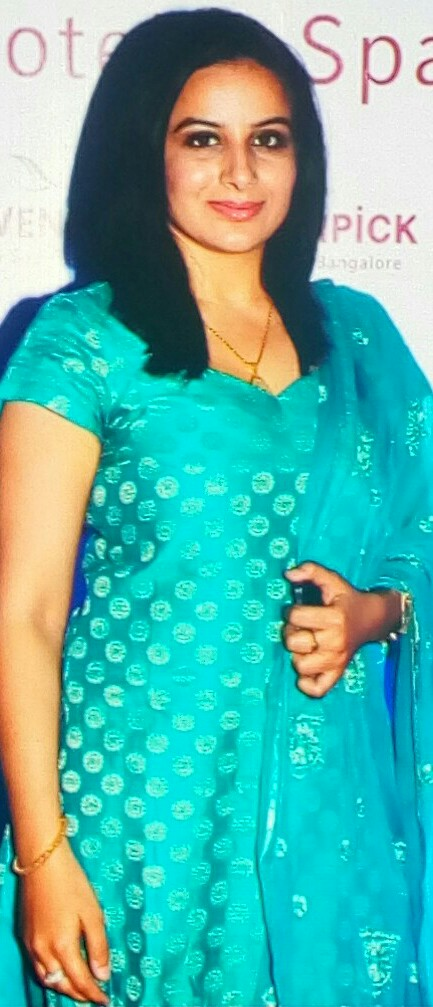
Gandhi during inauguration of hotel spa in Bangalore in 2015

In 2012, Gandhi made a comeback in the female-oriented film Dandupalya, which went on to become one of the highest-grossing films of the Kannada industry, and completed 100-day theatrical runs in Karnataka and Andhra Pradesh. It collected over ₹40 crore against budget of ₹3 crore. Gandhi received Filmfare Award for Best Kannada Actress and Suvarna Fimfare Award for Best Actress for her performance in Dandupalya. The film was dubbed in Telugu and released as Dandupalyam, which was well received in Andhra Pradesh.

Critics praised Gandhi for her performance; Rediff.com said she "walks away with acting honours", and called her "a stunner with her vain looks sans makeup throughout the movie and she has lived her role exceptionally well". DNA's critic wrote: "viewers should not miss out on Pooja's performance". Business Standard's critic stated:

Pooja Gandhi as the leader of the gang is brilliant and extremely confident in her role. While some may typecast her performance as cheap and unwelcoming, I believe it takes guts for a regular heroine to shed her image and agree to play such a gritty part. She definitely deserves special mention for proving cliches wrong.

The Times of India's critic stated: "Pooja Gandhi walks away with full honours".

In 2013, Gandhi made her Malayalam film debut in Maad Dad (2013) with Lal and Meghana Raj. Then she became an Item number in the Kannada film Director's Special (2013). According to sources, Gandhi rejected a request to perform a special song for Devarane (2013) but she later accepted this offer because the director Guruprasad wrote this song with her in mind. She appears in the song as Chanchal Champakali. In 2015, she starred in and produced Abhinetri.

In 2017, she starred in the Dandupalya 2, which is the sequel to Dandupalya. In 2018, her next film was Dandupalya 3, along with almost same cast and crew. Gandhi received acclaim from critics and audiences for her performance in the film. The writer Sunayana Suresh of The Times of India stated: "Pooja Gandhi in her uninhibited avatar is another person who deserves applause". The writer Sharadha of New Indian Express stated: "Pooja Gandhi wins over the audience with her powerful performance".

== Politics ==
On 18 January 2012, Pooja Gandhi joined the political party Janata Dal (Secular) (JDS). She then briefly was a member of the Karnataka Janata Paksha (KJP) but she contested the 2013 Karnataka Legislative Assembly elections in the seat of Raichur as a candidate for Badavara Shramikara Raitara Congress (BSR Congress) but she failed to win the seat.

== Controversy ==
Pooja Gandhi and the film Dandupalya were criticised by the social group Bahujan Samaj Horata Samiti for a scene, which they said is offensive. After the movie's release, Ambedkar Kranthi Sena activists demonstrated in Bengaluru against the film's "glorification of anti-social activities". Pooja countered this claim, saying: "According to the dictionary, nudity means that you are not covered with a single item of clothing from head to toe. But in this scene, I have worn a sari and I am trying to cover my body, except for my back".

== Filmography ==
Key
†	Denotes films that have not yet been released

=== Kannada films ===
Year	Film	Role	Notes	Ref.
2006	Mungaru Male	Nandini	Kannada debut	
2007	Milana	Priya		
2007	Krishna	Pooja	Suvarna Film Awards for Best Actress	
2007	Manmatha	Herself	Special appearance	
2007	Geleya	Herself	Special appearance in song "Hudugi Malebillu"	
2008	Hani Hani	Pooja		
2008	Accident	Pooja		
2008	Kaamannana Makkalu	Herself	Special appearance in the song "Mungaru Male"	
2008	Nee Tata Naa Birla	Pooja		
2008	Taj Mahal	Shruthi	Nominated—Filmfare Award for Best Kannada Actress	
2008	Kodagana Koli Nungitha	Lakshmi		
2008	Budhivanta	Pooja		
2008	Maharshi	Manasa Veena		
2008	Janumada Gelathi	Manjula		
2008	Haage Summane	Nandini	Special appearance	
2009	Anu	Anu		
2009	Iniya	Janaki		
2009	Huchchi	Preethi		
2009	Ninagaagi Kaadiruve	Shweta Nandan		
2009	Gokula	Leela		
2010	Minugu	Sanchitha		
2010	Sri Harikathe	Pooja Krishnamurthy		
2010	Naa Rani Nee Maharani	Rani / Pooja Gandhi		
2010	Vega	herself		
2011	Aptha	Anjali Devi		
2011	Nee Illadhe	Sharanya		
2011	Hare Rama Hare Krishna	Rakshita		
2011	Panchamrutha	Preethi		
2011	Jogayya	Advocate	Cameo appearance	
2011	Paagal	Pooja		
2012	Dandupalya	Lakshmi	Suvarna Film Award for Best Actress; SIIMA Award for Best Actress in a Negative Role; Nominated—Filmfare Award for Best Actress	
2012	Jaihind	Anjali		
2012	Hosa Prema Purana	Herself	Special appearance in the song "Sye Sye Monika"	
2012	Hasanambha	Maheswari	Special appearance	
2013	Director's Special	Herself	Special appearance in the song "Kannalle Eshottu Kolltiya"	
2014	Kalyanamasthu	Radha		
2015	Abhinetri	Sharat Lata / Nanda	Also producer	
2015	Thippaji Circle	Thippajji		
2016	Kathe Chitrakathe Nirdeshana Puttanna	Herself	Guest appearance	
2017	Jilebi	Jilebi		
2017	Dandupalya 2	Kempi	Dubbed in Telugu as Dandupalyam 2	
2018	Dandupalya 3	Lakshmi	Dubbed in Telugu as Dandupalyam 3	
2022	Samharini	Durga	Released directly on television	

=== Other language films ===
Year	Film	Role	Language	Notes	Ref.
2001	Khatron Ke Khiladi	Sangeeta	Hindi	Hindi debut	
2002	Dushmani	Pooja	Hindi		
2003	Tomake Salam	Ankita	Bengali	Bengali debut	
2006	Kokki	Raji	Tamil	Tamil debut	
2007	Thottal Poo Malarum	Herself	Tamil	Special appearance in the song "Vaadi Vambu Pennae"	
2008	Vaitheeswaran	Sanjana	Tamil		
2008	Thiruvannamalai	Malathy	Tamil		
2009	Thalai Ezhuthu	Pooja	Tamil		
2010	Mukkanti	Geeta	Telugu	Telugu Debut	
2010	I Am	Aparna	Hindi		
2013	Maad Dad	Lisa	Malayalam	Malayalam debut	
2022	Thaggedele	Lakshmi	Telugu	Dubbed in Kannada as Hubli Dhaba	

=== As producer ===
Year	Title	Language	Notes	Ref.
2015	Abhinetri	Kannada	Debut as film producer	

== Television ==
Year	Title	Role	Channel	Language	Notes
2003-2004	Awaz – Dil Se Dil Tak	Tanya	Zee TV	Hindi	
2004	Zameen Se Aassman Tak		Sahara One	Hindi	
2016	Bigg Boss Kannada 3	Contestant	Colors Kannada	Kannada	She was a Top 5 finalist.
2024	Ninagaagi	Herself	Colors Kannada	Kannada	

== Awards and nominations ==
Awards and nominations
Award	Wins	Nominations
South Indian International Movie Awards	1	1
Filmfare Awards	0	2
Suvarna Film Awards	3	2
- Totals
Awards won	4
Nominations	6

=== Awards ===
Year (Note: Refers to the year in which the ceremony was held.)	Category	Award	Film	Result
2008	Best Actress	Suvarna Film Awards	Krishna	Won
2009	Best Actress	Filmfare Awards South	Taj Mahal	Nominated
2010	Most popular Actress	Suvarna Film Awards	Gokula	Won
2013	Best Actress in a Negative Role	South Indian International Movie Awards	Dandupalya	Won
2013	Best Actress in a negative role	Filmfare Awards South	Dandupalya	Nominated
2013	Best Actress	Suvarna Film Awards	Dandupalya	Won
