= Jolly Bastian =

Indian film stunt master (1966–2023)

Jolly Bastian (24 September 1966 – 26 December 2023) was an Indian stunt master predominantly working in the South Indian film industry. His portfolio of 900 films included Putnanja, Annayya, Nattukku Oru Nallavan, Bangalore Days, Crazy Star, Super Ranga, Shyloo, Aramane, Gaalipata, Silence, Overtake (2017), Operation Java (2021) and Oru Cinemakkaran (2017) He also ran an event management and orchestra group named 24 Events, in which he was also the lead singer.

== Early life ==
Jolly Bastian was born on 24 September 1966 in Alleppey, but was brought up in Bengaluru. He studied at St Patrick's, Bangalore. Both his father and grandfather were mechanical technicians.

== First break and growth ==
Bastian too started off as a mechanic. Whilst performing a wheelie on his bike, a filmmaker noticed and introduced him to the Kannada film industry as a stuntman. His first project was to be the dupe for Ravichandran in Premaloka. Jolly was just 17 years old then. Until 1994, he was involved in small stunts and then he got his dream break as the action director in Ravinchandran's Putnanja, which went on to become a super hit.

Bastian was also the chief of Karnataka Stunt Directors and Professionals Association.

== Professional risks ==
Bastian was known for his bike and car stunts in Sandalwood. A bomb blast scene in Bhale Chatura broke his collarbone and two ribs. A bike fall in Putnanja damaged his face and knees. He said, "As a stunt man, the profession itself is risky. Today there is new equipment to help us. Ropes and harness equipment have made jumps and other stunts safe to a large extent. Fireproof clothes have made working in scenes involving fire safe."

== Directorial stint ==
Bastian was the director of the film Ninagaagi Kaadiruve, which was commercially unsuccessful. In an interview, he said, "My directorial venture- Ninagagi Kaadiruve, a romantic thriller, wasn't a bad movie. I had to suffer a lot due to a wrong partner. It was a tough phase in my life. I am doing another movie shortly, which is in the writing phase. Another original story like my debut work. I'll continue to make original movies instead of remakes. I want to show that creativity can mint money and not pose financial loss to a producer. I want to break that barrier!"

== Singer ==
Jolly had an orchestra group '24 Events' in which he was the lead singer. He also sang on occasions.

== Death ==
Bastian died of a heart attack on 26 December 2023, at the age of 57.

== Filmography ==
- Premaloka (Kannada)
- Putnanja (Kannada)
- Annayya (Telugu)
- Butterflies (Malayalam)
- Dum (Tamil)
- Nattukku Oru Nallavan (Tamil)
- Ayalum Njanum Thammil (Malayalam)
- Bangalore Days (Malayalam)
- Crazy Star (Kannada)
- Super Ranga (Kannada)
- Shyloo (Kannada)
- Aramane (Kannada)
- Gaalipata (Kannada)
- Nakshatram (Telugu)
- Popcorn Monkey Tiger (Kannada)
- Operation Java (Malayalam)
- Oru Kuttanadan Blog (Malayalam)
- Angamaly Diaries (Malayalam)
- Kammattipadam (Malayalam)
- Kali (Malayalam)
- Aadupuliyattam (Malayalam)
- Kaduva (Malayalam)
- Kammara Sambhavam (Malayalam)
- Villain (Malayalam)
- Kaaval (Malayalam)
- Erida (Malayalam-Tamil)
- Masterpiece (Kannada)
- Masterpiece (Malayalam)
- Highway (Malayalam)
- Johnnie Walker (Malayalam)
- Love (Kannada)
- Vamshi (Kannada)
- The Body (Hindi)
- Darwaza Bandh Rakho (Hindi)
- Bailaras (Punjabi)
- Chachi 420 (Punjabi)
- Kannur Squad (Malayalam) - co-choreographer
- Premalu (Malayalam)
