= KEISIE International University =

American online university

KEISIE International University, Inc.
- Motto: Education for life
- Type: Private
- Established: 2007
- President: Dr. Wayne Bottiger
- Location: Dallas, United States
- Campus: Online, distance
- Website: https://keisieuniversity.com/

KEISIE International University, Inc., is a not-for-profit online university based in Dallas, United States, and formerly registered as a business in the U.S. state of Arkansas as K.E.I. The university is currently registered in Delaware and Texas.

== History ==
KEI was organized in 2007 as KEI-TEFL to provide ten-week online certification courses in teaching English as a foreign language. With the conversion of KEI-TEFL into a graduate school, the name KEISIE was adopted in 2008 and the name KEISIE Graduate School of International Education was assumed in 2008. Formal enrollment of graduate students began in May 2008. The Graduate School has research centers in Sri Lanka and India, where it is formally known as KEISIE International University. The university and Graduate School also have a wide variety of higher education distance, onsite and online degree program offerings. The university was incorporated in the United States on November 29, 2017, as a not for profit online organization. Currently, the university is registered in Delaware as KEISIE International University, Inc. and in Texas as KEISIE Institute, Inc.

== Administration ==
KEI was once registered with the Arkansas Secretary of State as a for-profit business in 2008. The organization decided to do no business in the state of Arkansas and as a result, its state registration is listed as "revoked". The registration listed the following officers:

- Michael Lasala, Incorporator
- Song Hee Lee, Vice Chair, Treasurer, Controller, Tax Preparer
- Alvin Wayne Bottiger, Vice-President
- William David Zoll, Secretary

== Dr. Wayne Bottiger ==
Dr. Wayne Bottiger (b. 1955) is the founder of KEI and KEISIE International University, and he serves as the current president of the university, as well as continuing his work in South Korea where he is a dual citizen of the United States and South Korea. He holds an MEd degree in instructional technology from American Intercontinental University, 2004, an MD degree in alternative and oriental medicine, and a PhD from Kangwon National University, Chuncheon, South Korea. Bottiger is a professor at KEISIE International University, Inc. and author of articles and KEI-published books on EFL instruction and alternative medicine under the name Wayne Bottiger. In summer 2009, Bottiger was a native-speaking assistant teacher (원어민 보조교사; wŏnŏmin bojokyosa) at Cheongpyeong Technical High School (청평공업고등학교; ch’ŏngp’yŏng kongŏp kodŭn hakyo) in Cheongpyeong, South Korea.

== Accreditation ==
KEISIE International University, Inc. is incorporated as a non-for-profit, online organization and registered with the Delaware and Texas Secretary of State Offices to provide its educational services. The original private language school "K.E.I." was registered domestically as a business on May 18, 2007, and listed as a “외국어학원 (온라인)” (oegugŏ hagwŏn [onlain]; foreign language institute [online]). On October 20, 2008, KEI was authorized to transact business in Arkansas, USA, as a for-profit corporation in good standing. The primary purpose of KEI is “business activity related to online education.” Currently, KEISIE International University, Inc. does not have any accreditation that is recognized by the US Department of Education. Currently, KEISIE International University is Accredited by CIAC, an International organization offering accreditation services to private institutions of higher education.

== Academics ==
KEISIE International University, Inc. currently offers a variety of masters and doctoral degree programs, as well as English language teaching certification.

- Religious Educational Leadership (EdD) (no longer available)
- Higher Education Administration (EdD, PhD)
- Educational Leadership (PhD)
- International Education (PhD, MEd, MA)
- Educational Management (MEd, MA)
- Community and Adult Education (MEd, MA)
- Curriculum and Instruction (TESOL MEd, MA)
- Educational Management (MEd, MA)
- Teaching and Instruction TESOL-TEFL Teacher Training (certificate)

Courses and instruction are delivered online through the ATutor learning content management system.
