= 53rd Filmfare Awards South =

Award ceremony for South Indian films

- Site: Jawaharlal Nehru Indoor Stadium, Chennai, India

The 53rd Filmfare Awards South ceremony, honouring the winners and nominees of the best of South Indian cinema in films released in 2005, was held at the Jawaharlal Nehru Indoor Stadium, Chennai on 9 September 2006.

== Main awards ==
Winners are listed first, highlighted in boldface.

=== Kannada cinema ===
Best Film	Best Director
**Nenapirali**; Aakash; Amruthadhare; Anna Thangi; Jogi	**Ratnaja – Nenapirali**; Nagathihalli Chandrashekhar – Amruthadhare; Om Sai Prakash – Anna Thangi; Prem – Jogi
Best Actor	Best Actress
**Prem Kumar – Nenapirali**; Puneeth Rajkumar – Aakash; Shivaraj Kumar – Jogi; Sudeep – My Autograph; Upendra – Auto Shankar	**Vidya Venkatesh – Nenapirali**; Meena – My Autograph; Radhika – Anna Thangi; Ramya – Amruthadhare; Shilpa Shetty – Auto Shankar
Best Music Director
**Hamsalekha – Nenapirali**

=== Malayalam cinema ===
Best Film	Best Director
**Achuvinte Amma**	**Blessy – Thanmathra**
Best Actor	Best Actress
**Mohanlal – Thanmathra**	**Meera Jasmine – Achuvinte Amma**
Best Music Director
**Ilaiyaraaja – Achuvinte Amma**

=== Tamil cinema ===
Best Film	Best Director
**Anniyan**	**Shankar – Anniyan**; A. R. Murugadoss – Ghajini
Best Actor	Best Actress
**Vikram – Anniyan**; Jiiva – Raam; Sarath Kumar – Ayya; Suriya – Ghajini	**Asin – Ghajini**; Asin – Majaa; Jyothika – Chandramukhi; Meera Jasmine – Kasthuri Maan; Sadha – Anniyan
Best Supporting Actor	Best Supporting Actress
**Rajkiran – Thavamai Thavamirundhu**	**Saranya Ponvannan – Thavamai Thavamirundhu**
Best Comedian	Best Villain
**Vadivelu – Chandramukhi**	**Prakash Raj – Sivakasi**
Best Music Director	Best Lyricist
**Harris Jayaraj – Anniyan**	**Vairamuthu – Anniyan** ("O Sukumari"); Thamarai – Ghajini ("Oru Maalai")
Best Male Playback Singer	Best Female Playback Singer
**Karthik – Ghajini** ("Oru Maalai")	**Binny Krishnakumar – Chandramukhi** ("Raa Raa")

=== Telugu cinema ===
Best Film	Best Director
**Nuvvostanante Nenoddantana**; Athadu; Chhatrapati; Sankranthi; Super	**Trivikram Srinivas – Athadu**; Muppalaneni Siva – Sankranthi; Prabhudeva – Nuvvostanante Nenoddantana; Puri Jagannadh – Super; S. S. Rajamouli – Chhatrapati
Best Actor	Best Actress
**Siddharth – Nuvvostanante Nenoddantana**; Mahesh Babu – Athadu; Nagarjuna – Super; Prabhas – Chhatrapati; Venkatesh – Sankranthi	**Trisha – Nuvvostanante Nenoddantana**; Trisha – Athadu; Charmee Kaur – Anukokunda Oka Roju; Ayesha Takia – Super; Shriya Saran – Chhatrapati
Best Supporting Actor	Best Supporting Actress
**Srihari – Nuvvostanante Nenoddantana**; Srihari – Mahanandi; Srikanth – Sankranthi; Shafi – Chhatrapati; Jagapati Babu – Anukokunda Oka Roju	**Neha Oberoi – Balu ABCDEFG**; Veda – Nuvvostanante Nenoddantana; Anushka Shetty – Super; Sangeetha – Sankranthi; Bhanupriya – Chhatrapati
Best Comedian	Best Villain
**Ali – Super**; Sunil – Nuvvostanante Nenoddantana; Brahmanandam – Athadu; Venu Madhav – Chhatrapati; Venu Madhav – Athanokkade	**Ashish Vidyarthi- Athanokkade**; Pradeep Rawat – Chhatrapati; Arbaaz Khan – Jai Chiranjeeva; Sayaji Shinde – Andhrudu; Prakash Raj – Bunny
Best Music Director	Best Lyricist
**Devi Sri Prasad – Nuvvostanante Nenoddantana**; Mani Sharma – Athadu; M. M. Keeravani – Chhatrapati; S. A. Rajkumar – Sankranthi; Sandeep Chowta – Super	**Sirivennela Sitaramasastri – Nuvvostanante Nenoddantana** ("Ghal Ghal"); Sirivennela Sitaramasastri – Chakram "Jagamanta Kutumbam"; Sirivennela Sitaramasastri – Nuvvostanante Nenoddantana "Chandrullo Unde"; Chandrabose – Balu ABCDEFG "Inthe Inthinte"; Sivasakthi Datta – Chhatrapati "Agni Skalana"
Best Male Playback Singer	Best Female Playback Singer
**Shankar Mahadevan – Nuvvostanante Nenoddantana** ("Chandrullo Unde"); Sagar – Bunny "Jabilammavo"; Karthik – Athadu "Pilichina"; S.P. Balasubrahmanyam – Nuvvostanante Nenoddantana "Ghal Ghal Ghal Ghal"; M. M. Keeravani – Allari Bullodu "Trisha Achata Ichata"; Tippu – Nuvvostanante Nenoddantana "Something Something"	**Smita – Anukokunda Oka Roju** ("Evaraina"); Malathy – Bunny "Jabilammavo"; Shreya Ghoshal – Athadu "Pillagali Allari"; Shreya Ghoshal – Modati Cinema "Neeke Nuvvu"; Kavitha Krishnamurthy – Athadu "Pilichina"; K. S. Chitra – Nireekshana "Manasa Manasa"

== Technical Awards ==
Best Choreography: Prabhudeva – Nuvvostanante Nenoddantana	Best Cinematography: Ravi Varman & V. Manikandan – Anniyan	Best Art Director: Sabu Cyril – Anniyan	Best Editor: Anthony Gonsalves – Ghajini'	Best Action Director: Peter Hein – Anniyan

== Special awards ==
Lifetime Achievement: Sukumari; Thilakan	Filmfare Award for Best Male Debut – South: Arya – Arinthum Ariyamalum	Filmfare Award for Best Female Debut – South: Padmapriya Janakiraman – Thavamai Thavamirundhu	Filmfare Award for Best Outstanding Background Score: Harris Jayaraj – Ghajini; Devi Sri Prasad – Nuvvostanante Nenoddantana
