= Raja Rajendra =

- Directed by: Pon Kumaran
- Written by: Pon Kumaran
- Produced by: Uday K. Mehta
- Starring: Sharan; Ishita Dutta; Vimala Raman
- Cinematography: Panner Selvam
- Edited by: Jo Ni Harsha
- Music by: Arjun Janya
- Production company: Sri Venkateshwara Krupa Enterprises
- Distributed by: Vasavi Enterprises
- Release date: 6 February 2015
- Running time: 144 minutes
- Country: India
- Language: Kannada

Raja Rajendra is a 2015 Kannada-language comedy film written and directed by Pon Kumaran. It stars Sharan, Ishita Dutta, Vimala Raman and P. Ravi Shankar in the stellar roles. The film marks the reunion of director Kumaran and actor Sharan after their previous venture, Jai Lalitha. Produced by Uday K. Mehta, the film released on 6 February 2015. The core plot of the movie is based on the 1990 Malayalam movie His Highness Abdullah.

== Plot ==
This story is about a guy named Mani (Sharan), who is an imposter of a dreaded goon named Bottle Mani (P. Ravi Shankar). Due to this he earns the wrath of Bottle Mani. The story also focuses on Neelakanta Raju (Ramakrishna), a member of a royal family, an old man with three daughters and a long lost son. He hopes that his son and his grandson come to him one day, while his sons-in-law want him to die as soon as possible. To get the old man killed, the three sons-in-law along with Shastri (Suchendra Prasad) go to the city and contact a guy who promises to send Mani to act like the grandson of Neelakanta Raju. Instead of the original Bottle Mani, he fixes up Mani so that Mani could get his mother cured with the contract money.

Mani goes to the palace and gains entry into the household, but being of tender heart he fails to kill the old man; instead he saves the old man's life and gains his confidence. He also falls in love with Shastri's daughter in due course. The trio and Shastri, find out that Mani is different from Bottle Mani and try to expel him out of the house. However, the spirit of Raja Rajendra who was the father of Neelakanta Raju takes over Mani and teaches them a lesson. Day after day, every night the spirit takes over Mani and starts expelling the enemies of the family. This attracts the attention of the police and Inspector Indrajith (Sadhu Kokila) comes to investigate the issue.

The trio hire a black magician to seal the spirit of Raja Rajendra in a bottle and become successful. The spirit gets released when Indrajith discards the bottle by mistake. Unknowingly, Shastri's daughter requests magician to give the spirit of RR, and he gets confused as the bottles do not have any labels. He brings along spirits of a bus conductor, kabaddi player, independence activist and drama artists.

What follows is the laughter riot in climax where all these spirits take over different people there and how Mani wins over the trio.

== Cast ==
- Sharan as Mani and Raja Rajendra (dual role)
- Ishita Dutta as Swathi, Shastri's daughter, Mani's love interest
- Vimala Raman as Yamuna, Raja Rajendra's wife
- Ramakrishna as Neelakanta Raju, Raja Rajendra's son
- Sadhu Kokila as Inspector Indrajith
- Srinivasa Murthy as a music teacher, Neelakanta Raju's childhood friend
- P. Ravi Shankar as Bottle Mani
- Neenasam Ashwath as Neelakanta Raju's third son-in-law
- Suhas Girish
- Tabla Nani
- Lakshmi Siddaiah
- Suchendra Prasad as Shastri, Swathi's father
- Rekha Kumar
- Nurse Jayalakshmi as Inspector Indrajith's wife
- Kuri prathap as Black magician

== Production ==
Pon Kumaran who previously worked with Sharan in the comedy film Jai Lalitha had mutually agreed to do a mythological comedy film prior to the film's release. The film took off during July 2014 and quickly completed the filming process in and around Mysore and Bangalore locales. It was earlier reported that Sridhar V. Sambhram who composed music for Jai Lalitha would compose for this film as well. However, later Arjun Janya was hired to tune the music. Television actress Ishita Dutta was hired to play one of the leads opposite Sharan. Another south Indian actress Vimala Raman, who earlier acted in Aptharakshaka, was hired to play the second lead and joined the team on 15 November 2014 to shoot for her scenes.

== Soundtrack ==
Raja Rajendra

Soundtrack album by Arjun Janya
- Released: 6 January 2015
- Recorded: 2014
- Genre: Feature film soundtrack
- Label: Anand Audio

Arjun Janya has composed the background score and music for the film's soundtrack. Actor Sharan made his debut in singing with this film. The album consists of four tracks, the lyrics for which penned by K. Kalyan, V. Nagendra Prasad and Yogaraj Bhat.

No.	Title	Lyrics	Singer(s)	Length
1.	"Raja Rajendra"	K. Kalyan	Fayaz Khan
2.	"Mini Mini Vajramuni"	V. Nagendra Prasad	Vijay Prakash, Fayaz Khan
3.	"Madhyana Kanasinalli"	Yogaraj Bhat	Sharan, Manjula Gururaj
4.	"Haadu Haadutheeni"	V. Nagendra Prasad	Shankar Shanbog, Vijay Prakash

== Release ==
The film censored with 'U' certificate is all set to release on 6 February 2015.

=== Critical reception ===
G. S. Kumar of The Times of India rated the film 3/5 stars and wrote, "It appears to be more of a masala flick with doses of comedy randomly thrown in. The climax, loaded with too many dramatic sequences, is funny in bits but Sharan’s comedy is lost in the chaos." Shashiprasad S. M. of Deccan Chronicle gave it 3/5 stars and wrote, "Though nothing new in the film there are loads of usual humour filled for a laughter riot right till the end." Shyam Prasad S. of Bangalore Mirror gave it 3/5 stars and wrote, "Director P Kumar stretches cinematic licence to the limits to eke out as many laughs as possible. He succeeds to an extent and Raja Rajendra comes out as a nonsensical but entertaining comedy."
