= Premism =

- Directed by: Ratnaja
- Written by: Rathnaja
- Produced by: Ashok Gowda
- Starring: Amulya; Chetan Chandra; Varun; Sunil Raoh; Chirdeep Hebbar
- Cinematography: Ananth Urs
- Edited by: B. S. Kemparaj
- Music by: Hamsalekha
- Production company: Kalpana Shakti
- Release date: 2 April 2010
- Running time: 179 minutes
- Country: India
- Language: Kannada

Premism (Kannada: ಪ್ರೇಮಿಸಂ) is a 2010 Indian Kannada language romantic film directed by Ratnaja of Nenapirali fame. He has teamed up yet again with producer Ajay Gowda and music director Hamsalekha for the third time after Nenapirali and Honganasu in this film. The film mainly stars Chetan Chandra, Amulya and Varun with actor Sunil Raoh making a guest appearance.

The film released on 2 April 2010 across Karnataka and set high expectations for its storyline and picturization.

== Plot ==
Nitin (Chetan) and Varun (Varun) are the sons of a Police commissioner and head constable respectively. They have been at loggerheads since their childhood. Eventually, they both fall for the same girl Amulya, the sister of a traffic inspector. They express their love to her directly. But she travels back to her past in Belgaum where she was in love with Prasanna (Sunil Raoh). How the twosome win over her despite her background forms the rest of the story.

== Cast ==
- Chetan Chandra as Nitin
- Amulya as Amulya D'Souza
- Varun as Varun
- Ananth Nag
- Avinash
- Chirdeep Hebbar as Takkadi
- Sathyajith
- Ganesh Rao
- Neenasam Ashwath
- Rekha V Kumar
- Sunil Raoh as Prasanna in a guest appearance
- Ashwin rao pallakki
- Surya kamath
- Shashikanth

== Filming ==
Most of the filming took place at Mysore localities which was also the centered in director's earlier film Nenapirali. Some parts of the film was based in Belgaum as well. The filming also took place at the Chhattisgarh locations like Chitrakoot falls and Thiratghat falls making it the first regional film to have shot in the place. The film team left to the Macau islands at China for the song sequence and finished the same in couple of days time. The song "Premism Premism" is choreographed by 'Attakalari' Jayachandran who composed the dance involving 5 elements of earth - Sky, Fire, Wind, Water and Air.

== Soundtrack ==
Premism

Soundtrack album by Hamsalekha
- Released: 26 October 2009
- Genre: Film soundtrack
- Label: Anand Audio
- Producer: Hamsalekha

All the songs are composed and written by Hamsalekha teaming up with the director and producer for the third time after Nenapirali and Honganasu. The songs were well received and remained at the top of the charts.

All lyrics are written by Hamsalekha; all music is composed by Hamsalekha.

Track listing
No.	Title	Singer(s)	Length
1.	"Hodi Line"	Jassie Gift
2.	"Premism Premism"	Rajesh Krishnan, Shreya Ghoshal
3.	"Gulabi Kennege"	Kunal Ganjawala, Anuradha Bhat
4.	"Mysorege Aishu Bandalu"	S. P. Balasubrahmanyam, Hemanth Kumar
5.	"Arishina Kumkuma"	K. S. Chithra
6.	"Sagamapanisa"	Sonu Nigam
7.	"Premism Premism (Pathos)"	Rajesh Krishnan, Anuradha Bhat

== Reception ==
=== Critical response ===
Shruti Indira Lakshminarayana of Rediff.com scored the film at 3.5 out of 5 stars and wrote "Hamsalekha's songs are catchy. A song which carries the tunes of Kurrak Kuknalikere... a hit number from Nenapirali, directed by Rathnaja, has been composed for the film. The song speaks of prominent areas in Mysore. Choreographers have used a mix of contemporary, tap, classical and folk styles to match the tunes. All in all, Premism is for those who like love stories". A critic from Bangalore Mirror wrote "Premism is a film which concerns itself only with love without baggage of tearjerker sentiments. Ratnaja proceeds with a long winding narrative. But with a not-so-regular concept, he wins with the substance. There are also a couple of surprises. A sure hit for those who enjoy love stories". A critic from Deccan Herald wrote "The basic plot itself looks interesting and the fight between the sons of two close friends working in the police force has been well narrated. The first half is certainly engaging as it has many fun-filled moments. The best thing is that story moves forward with each sequence and proceedings really look interesting.“Premism” is certainly the best of Rathnaja’s works so far".
