= Prem (Kannada actor) =

Indian actor (born 1975)

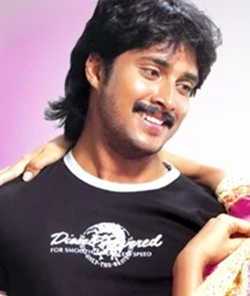
- Prem in Pallakki (2007)
- Born: Prem Kumar; 18 April 1976 (age 50); Karnataka, India
- Occupation: Actor
- Years active: 2004–present
- Spouse: Jyoti (m. 2000)
- Children: 2

Prem Kumar (born 18 April 1976), known mononymously as Prem, also popularly called as Nenapirali Prem, is an Indian actor and producer who works in Kannada films. He made his acting debut through the film Praana (2004). However, his major break came through the film Nenapirali (2005) for which he won his first Filmfare Award for Best Actor. Since then, Prem is largely offered films with romantic theme thereby, earning the title Lovely Star in Kannada cinema. Prem also produced the film Pallakki (2007) besides acting in the lead role.

Prem's other notable films include Jothe Jotheyali (2006), Pallakki (2007), Gunavantha (2007), Savi Savi Nenapu (2007), Charminar (2013), for which he won his second Filmfare award, Chowka (2017) and Premam Poojyam (2021), which marked his 25th film as an actor.

== Early life ==
Prem was born in Bangalore in 1976. His father was a power loom weaver and an avid movie watcher. He completed his higher secondary schooling at a Government school and got himself enrolled to pursue ITI. He was duped of the money while enrolling into ITI and eventually landed up working along with his father at the power loom. While he was at work, he used to watch films and often accompany his father to the theaters. One of his friends, who was the driver of director T. N. Seetharam, persuaded him to try his luck in acting either in big screen or television. Initially dismissing his suggestion, Prem had to reluctantly heed owing to his losses at the loom. He was taken to the sets of Seetharam's Manvantara serial to act as a junior artist in 2001. He ended up featuring in eight episodes of the serial and also featured in one episode of other serial, Ardha Satya.

== Career ==
=== 2004-2010 ===
Prem began his film career through debutant director Prakash's Praana (2004) after a successful audition. The film's cast and crew consisted of newcomers with Prem pairing with actress Preethi Chandrashekar. It was revealed in an interview that Prem took up acting seriously only during the making of this film. Despite doing good business and receiving favorable reviews, the film was removed off theaters after a four-week run.

Prem's first commercially successful film as a lead actor was the romantic drama Nenapirali (2005). The film, directed by Ratnaja and produced by Ajay Gowda, featured him in the lead role opposite Vidhya Venkatesh and Varsha. The film's music by Hamsalekha was highly acclaimed and upon release, it received positive reviews and was declared a musical blockbuster. Prem earned his first Filmfare Award for Best Actor for his performance in the film. The film's popularity led to the title being tagged with Prem's name among media and audiences. The success of this film fetched him his second successful film Jothe Jotheyali (2006) which was directed by Dinakar Thoogudeepa and co-produced by his brother Darshan under their home banner "Thoogudeepa Productions". Prem was paired opposite Ramya and played the role of a struggling ad film maker and marrying an established bank employee which eventually result in a troubled relationship. The film received positive reviews from critics and was commercially successful.

In 2007, Prem launched his production venture "P2 Productions" and produced his maiden film, Pallakki. Directed by K. Narendra Babu, the film starred Prem opposite newcomer Ramanithu Choudhary. Despite receiving negative reviews from critics, the film was successful at the box office with over 100 days run at the theaters. Following this, in the same year, his next release was cinematographer Santhosh Rai Pathaje's romantic drama, Savi Savi Nenapu which featured him in dual roles opposite Mallika Kapoor and Tejaswini Prakash. He wrapped up the year with yet another romantic drama Gunavantha, where he paired with Rekha Vedavyas, which was a sleeper hit at the box-office. In 2008, Prem teamed up with Rathaja again for his second directorial film, Honganasu. Anuradha Mehta and Anjali were paired opposite him which saw a moderate success at the box-office.

In 2009, Prem appeared in Ghauttham, a remake of the Tamil film Aahaa..!. Having expressed his aversion towards acting in remake films, he took up this film since there were no other offers for him during the year.

In 2010, he teamed up with heroine Ramya for the film Jothegara. Other films which he signed are Sihi Muttu, alongside Dhyan and Pooja Chopra, Januma Janumadallu with Andrita Ray, a cameo in Shivarajkumar's travel extravaganza Cheluveye Ninne Nodalu and also in Eradane Maduve.

=== 2011-2020 ===
Prem began his 2011 career with a cameo appearance in the multi-starrer film Eradane Maduve, which had Ananth Nag and Suhasini in the main lead. Later he starred in I Am Sorry Mathe Banni Preethsona, a film which made news for its controversial kiss scene between the lead pair. The other film of the year was Dhan Dhana Dhan opposite Sharmila Mandre, which also failed to get the box office collections.

In 2013, he acted in director Roopa Iyer's Chandra. While the Kannada version got a good opening, the Tamil version failed to open even at the box office. This was followed by R. Chandru's Charminar which found success and his performance was talked about with IBNLive.com praising him that "this" could well be considered his best film. He got his second Filmfare Best Actor award for this film. His next release was the two-year-old long pending project Shatru, which featured him in the role of a police officer for the first time. Though he got favorable reviews for his performance, the film failed at the box office.

His other long pending projects like Shatru and Athi Aparoopa released to a cold response at the box office in 2014. However, his other 2014 release Fair & Lovely with director Raghuram performed extremely well at the box office and earned him many accolades and awards. In 2015, Prem re-associated with R. Chandru through the film Male opposite Amulya. The film met with average response both critically and commercially. His next release was a cameo appearance in the all-women crew film Ring Road followed by a lead role in a romantic film Mast Mohabbat in 2016. In 2017, Prem starred as one of the jail inmates in the Dwarakish's 50th production multistarrer film Chowka, which went on to become one of the highest-grossing films of the year.

In July 2017, it was reported that he would appear in Prashant Raj's romantic drama Dalapathi. The film, also starring Kriti Kharbanda in the lead, received negative response at the box-office. He appeared next in Dinakar Thoogudeepa's Life Jothe Ondu Selfie co-starring Prajwal Devaraj and Hariprriya. Prem played the role of an aspiring filmmaker who travels to Goa to find solace from a troublesome situation and meets two other similar fated individuals and become friends. The film was an average grosser at the box-office. For the next two years, he took a sabbatical from acting with no films releasing except a special appearance in the Darshan starrer Yajamana (2019) along with Prajwal Devaraj and Vinod Prabhakar.

=== 2021-till date ===
Prem next release was Premam Poojyam in 2021, which also marked his 25th acting assignment. The film was marketed as the first film to be shot with an Arri Alexa Anamorphic camera and would feature as many as 12 songs as its soundtrack. Upon release, the film was a box office hit and received positive reviews from the public and critics. After a hiatus of three years, Prem featured next in the family drama Appa I Love You in 2024 which had main role played by Tabla Nani and also featured Manvitha Harish. The film received negative response for its predictable storyline and did not create an impact with the audience.

== Filmography ==
Key
†	Denotes films that have not yet been released

Year	Title	Role	Notes	Ref
2004	Praana	Jeeva	Debut film	
2005	Nenapirali	Kishore	Filmfare Award for Best Actor – Kannada	
2006	Jothe Jotheyali	Nakul		
2007	Pallakki	Lakshmikanth	Also producer	
2007	Savi Savi Nenapu	Prem / Raj	Dual role	
2007	Gunavantha	Gunashekar		
2008	Honganasu	Sagar		
2009	Ghauttham	Gautham		
2010	Jothegara	Vishwas		
2010	Cheluveye Ninne Nodalu	Prem	Cameo appearance	
2011	Eradane Maduve	Vivek	Cameo appearance	
2011	I Am Sorry Mathe Banni Preethsona	Shyam		
2011	Dhan Dhana Dhan	Prem		
2013	Charminar	Mohan	Filmfare Award for Best Actor – Kannada	
2013	Chandra	Chandrahasa	Kannada-Tamil bilingual film	
2013	Shathru	Vijay Surya		
2014	Athi Aparoopa	Bharath		
2014	Adyaksha	Himself	Special appearance in the song "Phonu Illa"	
2014	Fair & Lovely	Manoj "Manu"		
2015	Male	Varun		
2015	Ring Road	Himself	Special appearance in the song "Kanasige Koneyilla"	
2016	Mast Mohabbat	Sri		
2017	Chowka	Hakki Gopala		
2018	Dalapathi	Ram		
2018	Life Jothe Ondh Selfie	Nakul		
2019	Yajamana	Himself	Special appearance in the song "Shiva Nandi"	
2021	Premam Poojyam	Srihari		
2024	Appa I Love You	Rahul		
2026	Spark	SP Ranjith Kumar		
2026	Di Di Dikki †	TBA		
