= Appa I Love You =

- Theatrical release poster
- Directed by: Athrav Arya
- Written by: Tabla Nani (dialogues)
- Screenplay by: Atharv Arya
- Story by: Atharv Arya
- Starring: Prem: Tabla Nani; Manvitha Kamath; Vikas; Jeevitha Vasishta
- Cinematography: R. D. Nagarjun
- Edited by: Vedhik Veera
- Music by: Akash Parva
- Production company: KRS Productions
- Distributed by: Casablanca Film Factory
- Release date: 12 April 2024
- Country: India
- Language: Kannada

Appa I Love You (transl. Dad, I love you) is a 2024 Indian Kannada-language family drama film directed by Athrav Arya and starring Prem, Tabla Nani in the titular role, and Manvitha Kamath, Vikas and Jeevitha Vasishta. The film's title is named after a song in Chowka (2017). The film was theatrically released on 12 April 2024 and received mixed-to-negative reviews.

== Plot ==
It delves into the heart-wrenching narrative of parental trust shattered by betrayal. This emotionally charged drama shines light on a father's unwavering faith in his son, which unfortunately leads to a harrowing journey into homelessness and despair.

== Cast ==
- Prem as Rahul
- Tabla Nani as Dharmanna
- Manvitha Kamath as Kavya
- Vikas as Sanjay
- Jeevitha Vasishta as Sneha
- Bala Rajwadi
- Aravind Rao
- Vijay Chendoor
- Aruna Balraj
- Patel Annayappa

== Release ==
The film was released theatrically on 12 April 2024. Casablanca Film Factory handled the digital distribution, with the film beginning to stream on Amazon Prime Video from 27 December 2025.

== Reception ==
Sujay B M from Deccan Herald rated 2 out of 5 stars and wrote that "With repackaged content and crude execution, one has little to lose by skipping the film". Vinay Lokesh from The Times of India rated the film two-and-a-half out of five stars and wrote that "Director Atharv Arya tackles a relevant subject, but the treatment remains mediocre. Tabla Nani shines in his role as Dharmanna, while Prem and Manvitha deliver commendable performances within their limited screen time". A Sharadhaa from Cinema Express gave the film the same rating and wrote that "Appa I Love You is a film that might prompt a few to reconsider their approach with their parents and in-laws, especially regarding adoption. However, the film could have benefitted from a fresh approach". A critic from Times Now rated the film two out of five stars and wrote that "Despite its strong message at the end, Appa I Love You emerges as a drama that struggles to retain your interest in it".
