= Ghajini (2005 film) =

2005 Indian Tamil language action thriller film

- Theatrical release poster
- Directed by: A. R. Murugadoss
- Written by: A. R. Murugadoss
- Produced by: Salem Chandrasekharan
- Starring: Suriya; Asin; Nayanthara; Pradeep Rawat
- Cinematography: R. D. Rajasekhar
- Edited by: Anthony; Suresh Urs
- Music by: Harris Jayaraj
- Production company: Sri Saravanaa Creations
- Distributed by: Sri Saravanaa Creations Overseas Khafa Exports
- Release date: 29 September 2005
- Running time: 175 minutes
- Country: India
- Language: Tamil
- Budget: ₹7 crore
- Box office: ₹50 crore

Ghajini (pronounced [gadʐini]) is a 2005 Indian Tamil-language psychological action thriller film directed by A. R. Murugadoss and produced by Salem Chandrasekharan. The film stars Suriya, Asin, Nayanthara and Pradeep Rawat. Harris Jayaraj composed the soundtrack and background music, while R. D. Rajasekhar and Anthony were the cinematographer and editor, respectively. In the film, a wealthy businessman develops anterograde amnesia due to a head injury he sustains while attempting to save his lover from getting murdered by a human trafficker. Remembering only that, he seeks to avenge her murder with the aid of photographs from an instant camera and permanent tattoos on his body.

The film was primarily shot at Chennai, while two song sequences were filmed in Switzerland. It was released on 29 September 2005, and became a major commercial success. The film was remade into a Hindi film with the same name by Murugadoss again in 2008, with Asin and Rawat reprising their roles. The film's story takes inspiration from the Christopher Nolan film Memento (2000) and the 1951 film Happy Go Lovely.

== Plot ==
Chitra is a medical student, who along with her friends is working on a project about the human brain. Chitra wants to investigate the curious case of Sanjay Ramaswamy, a notable Chennai-based rich businessman who is reported to have anterograde amnesia. Her professor Ravindran denies access to Sanjay's records as it is currently under criminal investigation. Overcome with curiosity, Chitra proceeds to investigate the matter herself in secret.

Sanjay loses his memory every 15 minutes and uses a system of photographs, notes, and tattoos to recover his memory after each cycle. It is revealed that Sanjay is ultimately out to avenge the death of his lover Kalpana and that he is systematically killing the people responsible. His main target is Lakshman, the head of a Kolkata-based human trafficking network and a notable socialite in Chennai. Inspector Ravi is on the case of the serial murders. He tracks Sanjay at his flat and knocks him unconscious. Ravi finds two diaries titled 2002 and 2003 where Sanjay has chronicled the events of his life.

In 2002, Sanjay, the owner of the AirVoice mobile telephone company, meets Kalpana, a struggling advertisement model, and secretly develops romantic feelings for her while introducing himself as "Manohar". Eventually, they spend time together and gradually develop a liking for each other. The diary ends with Sanjay proposing to Kalpana and promising himself that he will reveal himself as Sanjay Ramaswamy if she accepts.

Before Ravi can read the 2003 diary, Sanjay regains consciousness, attacks and ties him up. He tracks down Lakshman to a college function where the latter is the guest of honor. Sanjay takes pictures of Lakshman and decides to kill him. However, he mistakenly attacks and kills one of Lakshman's goons in the parking lot. Lakshman is perplexed and fails to recollect the incident. He decides to find and kill his enemies one by one, but Sanjay is not among them. In the meantime, Chitra visits Sanjay's flat and finds Ravi, beaten and bound. Chitra finds the two diaries and frees Ravi. She also finds that Lakshman is Sanjay's target. Ravi tells her that Sanjay is a known serial killer. Sanjay arrives suddenly; he remembers neither of them and chases them out. Ravi is eventually hit and killed by a bus, while Chitra barely escapes, going into a phone booth.

Believing Lakshman is in danger, Chitra informs him that Sanjay is after him. Sanjay discovers that Chitra had warned Lakshman and goes to her dormitory to kill her, but Chitra calls the police and Sanjay is arrested. Lakshman discovers about Sanjay through a police inquiry and arrives at Sanjay's flat, destroying all the photographs, notes and scratching off Sanjay's tattoos. Chitra reads the 2003 diary, which states that Kalpana accepted the proposal, but on the condition that she marry only after she completes her past commitment. The diary ends abruptly as Sanjay left for a business trip. Chitra investigates further and discovers that Kalpana was traveling to Mumbai for a modeling assignment by train when she rescued 25 innocent young Tamil girls being trafficked to Mumbai and Kolkata. Lakshman, the ringleader of the racket, killed two girls who recognized him and went in search of Kalpana. His goons broke into her apartment and tried to kill her, only to be trashed off by Sanjay, but Lakshman attacked Sanjay and kills Kalpana with an iron rod.

Now aware of the truth, Chitra finds Sanjay in the hospital and tells him everything. Sanjay tells her to lead him to Lakshman. Meanwhile, Lakshman's twin brother Ram arrives from Kolkata to help him pursue Sanjay. Arriving at Lakshman's factory in downtown Chennai, Sanjay sees Lakshman leaving in a car and follows him, but Chitra calls him and tells that he is here thinking that Ram is Lakshman, which everyone hears. Ram and his men try to kill her but she escapes to her dormitory. Ram and his henchmen arrive along with Lakshman and ask her to bring Sanjay, threatening to kill her friends otherwise. She goes to find Sanjay, along with their henchmen and finally finds him. Sanjay confronts and disables all of Lakshman's henchmen and goes to the dormitory to kill Lakshman. Sanjay fights off Lakshman and Ram but gets badly beaten and injured by them. But when he sees Kalpana's presence and recollects how Lakshman killed her, he overpowers and kills the brothers.

With his vengeance fulfilled, Sanjay leaves with Chitra, where he stops at a crossing to let young children cross the road. A young girl smiles at him and he returns the smile. Sanjay feels a presence of Kalpana in the child's smile. The story ends with an emotional moment.

== Cast ==
- Suriya as Sanjay Ramaswamy
- Asin as Kalpana, Sanjay's girlfriend
- Nayanthara as Chitra
- Pradeep Rawat in a dual role as:
  - Lakshman
  - Ram
- Riyaz Khan as Inspector Ravi Barnaboss
- Manobala as Kalpana's advertising firm owner
- Sathyan as Sanjay's impersonator
- Raneesh as Sanjay's assistant

== Production ==
"I found the basic story — the part about the memory loss — very interesting. It was something not dealt with in Tamil before. I thought even a layman could understand the medical problem. The screenplay was very exciting too".

— Suriya spoke about Ghajini in an interview to Rediff in 2009.

In 2004, AR Murugadoss began work on a film titled Mirattal, with Ajith Kumar and Asin, NIC Arts producing and Yuvan Shankar Raja as the music composer. However the project fell through and negotiations with Madhavan also collapsed. In November 2004, it was announced that the project was revived by Salem Chandrasekhar and that Suriya would portray the lead role. Suriya subsequently had to tonsure his head for the film before production, with Asin retaining her role while Shriya Saran was selected to play another role in the film. Murugadoss said that he had narrated the script to 12 actors but none of them agreed; Suriya was the 13th actor. The name of Asin's character Kalpana was inspired by the late Indian American astronaut Kalpana Chawla. Saran was later replaced by Nayanthara. Prakash Raj was the initial choice for the antagonist but was replaced by Pradeep Rawat because, according to Rawat, Raj never showed up for the shoot.

The film was launched on 11 February 2005 at AVM Studios in Chennai with the cast of the project in attendance. In early April 2005, two songs sequences were shot in Switzerland with costumes brought in from Paris for the shooting.

== Themes and influences ==
Ghajini was inspired by the American film Memento, which itself was adapted from the short story Memento Mori. In response to allegations of plagiarism, Aamir Khan noted "Murgadoss had heard about a film called Memento and the concept had really fascinated him. Without having seen the film he went ahead and wrote his own version of the script and screenplay. Having finished his script, he then saw Memento, found it very different from what he had written, and went ahead and made Ghajini." Malathi Rangarajan of The Hindu stated that: "Those who have watched Memento, will not miss the similarities between the English flick and Ghajini. Yet Murugadas's ingenuity lies in adapting the inspiration to suit the taste of the audience". Murugadoss stated, "I had written half the story of Ghajini when I saw Memento. I liked the character in the film who remembers things for just 15 minutes. So, I used just that character."

After the release of the Hindi remake, Christopher Nolan was reported to be upset when he found out that Murugadoss had borrowed elements from Memento without giving him due credit. However, later he spoke fondly of the success of the film. He said, "I have heard it was very successful, I heard people liked it. So I will watch it at some point. I was aware of it, and I am very honoured".

Several comical scenes in the film are similar to Happy Go Lovely (1951). The film's title is a reference to Mahmud of Ghazni, the tenth-century Sultan of Ghaznavid Empire whose name is pronounced "Ghajini" in Tamil.

== Soundtrack ==
The soundtrack features five songs composed by Harris Jayaraj. Regarding the song "Suttum Vizhi", Harris said that when Murugadoss narrated him the situation in which the hero is full of admiration for the heroine's attitude and compassion and he dreams of her. Initially, he thought of a peppy song but after hours of discussion, he decided on a melodious tune.

Tamil Track-List
No.	Title	Lyrics	Singer(s)	Length
1.	"Oru Maalai"	Thamarai	Karthik	5:55
2.	"Rahathulla"	Thamarai	Annupamaa	4:51
3.	"Suttum Vizhi"	Na. Muthukumar	Sriram Parthasarathy, Bombay Jayashree	5:19
4.	"Rangola Ola"	Kabilan	Shankar Mahadevan, Sujatha, Ranjith	4:27
5.	"X Machi"	Vaali	Mathangi, Nakul	4:13
Total length:				24:45

Telugu Track-List
No.	Title	Lyrics	Singer(s)	Length
1.	"Oka Maaru Kalisina"	Veturi Sundararama Murthy	Karthik	5:53
2.	"Rahathulla"	Chandrabose	Annupamaa	4:49
3.	"Hrudayam Ekkadunnadi"	Vennelakanti	Harish Raghavendra, Bombay Jayashri	5:16
4.	"Rangola Ola"	Veturi Sundararama Murthy	Tippu, Sujatha	4:22
5.	"X Pichi Y Pichi"	Bhuvanachandra	Mathangi, Nakul	4:09
Total length:				24:29

== Release ==
Ghajini was censored with a U/A certificate by the Central Board of Film Certification, with few minor cuts.

== Reception ==
=== Box office ===
The film and its dubbed Telugu release opened to high critical acclaim. Ghajini was a commercial success and became among the highest grossing Tamil films of that year. Ghajini, together with Chandramukhi and Anniyan, earned more than three times their combined cost of production.

The Telugu dubbed version, which was released on 4 November 2005, was also successful and did better business than many straight Telugu films. The film's success earned Suriya a fan following in Andhra Pradesh. It also prompted producers in the Telugu film industry, to acquire the dubbing rights to Suriya's Tamil films and release them in Telugu.

=== Critical response ===
Sify wrote, "Full marks to the director and Surya for coming out with one of the best edge-of-the-seat racy thriller seen in recent times. Malathi Rangarajan of The Hindu wrote that "Ghajini is recommended for those who seek extra strong, stylish, over-the-top entertainment" and also wrote that "it is an action film with plenty of intense, dark and suspenseful filled moments". Lajjavathi of Kalki praised the performances of Suriya and Asin, Rajasekhar's cinematography, Jayaraj's music and Murugadoss's direction.

== Awards and nominations ==
Award	Award Category	Nominee	Result
2005 Filmfare Awards South	Best Actress	Asin	Won
2005 Filmfare Awards South	Best Actor	Suriya	Nominated
2005 Filmfare Awards South	Best Director	A. R. Murugadoss	Nominated
2005 Filmfare Awards South	Filmfare Special Award	Harris Jayaraj	Won
2005 Filmfare Awards South	Best Film	Salem A. Chandrasekaran	Nominated
2005 Filmfare Awards South	Best Lyricist	Thamarai ("Oru Maalai")	Nominated
2005 Filmfare Awards South	Best Male Playback Singer	Sriram Parthasarathy ("Suttum Vizhi")	Nominated
2005 Filmfare Awards South	Best Male Playback Singer	Karthik ("Oru Maalai")	Won
2005 Filmfare Awards South	Best Female Playback Singer	Bombay Jayashree ("Suttum Vzhi")	Nominated
2005 Filmfare Awards South	Best Music Director	Harris Jayaraj	Nominated
2005 Filmfare Awards South	Best Cinematographer	R. D. Rajasekhar	Nominated
2005 Filmfare Awards South	Best Editor Award	Anthony	Won
2005 Tamil Nadu State Film Awards	Best Film	Ghajini	Won
2005 Tamil Nadu State Film Awards	Special Award for Best Actor	Suriya	Won
2005 Tamil Nadu State Film Awards	Best Music Director	Harris Jayaraj	Won
2005 Tamil Nadu State Film Awards	Best Male Playback Singer	Sriram Parthasarathy ("Suttum Vizhi")	Won
2005 Tamil Nadu State Film Awards	Best Female Playback Singer	Bombay Jayashree ("Suttum Vizhi")	Won
2005 Tamil Nadu State Film Awards	Best Cinematographer	R. D. Rajasekhar	Won
2005 Tamil Nadu State Film Awards	Best Lyricist	Na. Muthukumar ("Suttum Vizhi")	Won
2005 Tamil Nadu State Film Awards	Best Audiographer	A. S. Laxmi Narayanan	Won
2005 Tamil Nadu State Film Awards	Best Editor	Anthony	Won

== Remakes ==
Aamir Khan who saw the original film decided to remake the film in Hindi. Murugadoss again directed the Hindi version. Asin reprised her character and the film marked her debut in Bollywood. The climax in Hindi version was altered, with Murugadoss revealing that Khan rewrote the climax portions. In 2006, Munirathna announced that he would remake the film in Kannada with Upendra and Ramya. However the remake failed to materialise; instead the Telugu film Manmadhudu (2002) was remade in Kannada as Aishwarya (2006) and a few scenes were borrowed from Ghajini.

== Legacy ==
The film's success established Suriya as an action hero and Asin as a top actress. Asin described Kalpana in Ghajini as "a life-time role" for her. Nayanthara, who appeared in a supporting character, later said that appearing in Ghajini was a big mistake and the "worst decision" she ever took.

== In other media ==
In a comedy scene from Kovai Brothers (2006), Ganesh (Sathyaraj) parodies Suriya's looks from Ghajini to impress Namitha. In Pokkiri (2007), Body Soda (Vadivelu) imagines himself dancing for the song "Suttum Vizhi" with Sruthi (Asin). In Tamizh Padam (2010), Shiva (Shiva) remembers that he has to kill gangster Swarna when he looks at a Polaroid photo of her. In the Telugu film Dubai Seenu (2007), Seenu (Ravi Teja) plays a prank on Inspector Babji (Sayaji Shinde) by calling every women and singing "Oka Maaru" (Oru Maalai) and also getting him beaten up. Siva Reddy's character in Kousalya Supraja Rama (2008) is called "Ara Ghajini" (transl. Half Ghajini) and loses his memory every half an hour. In Maasilamani (2009), 'Coma' Ramaswamy (M. S. Bhaskar) imitates Suriya's entry scene in the film. In A Aa E Ee (2009), amnesia patient Rajini (Ali) runs into a nurse and the song "Hrudayam Ekkadunnadi" (Suttum Vizhi) plays in the background. In the Kannada film Rama Rama Raghurama (2011), a man in Suriya's getup attempts to kill Raghurama (Rangayana Raghu) after seeing him with the glass of tea in his polaroid photo. In Nuvva Nena (2012), Aaku Bhai (Brahmanandam) imagines himself dancing for the song "Hrudayam Ekkadunnadi" (Suttum Vizhi) with Nandini (Shriya Saran). In the 2014 Kannada film Kwatle Satisha, a remake of Tamil film Naduvula Konjam Pakkatha Kaanom (2012), the first look poster featured the film's actor Sathish Ninasam in the look inspired from Ghajini. The 2018 film Ghajinikanth was named as a blend of the words "Ghajini" and "Rajinikanth", and it was titled so because of the forgetful nature of Rajinikanth's character in Dharmathin Thalaivan (1988) and Suriya's character in Ghajini.
