= Savi Savi Nenapu =

- Directed by: Santosh Rai Pathaje
- Written by: Santosh Rai Pathaje
- Produced by: S V Babu
- Starring: Prem Kumar; Mallika Kapoor; Tejaswini Prakash
- Cinematography: Chandrashekhar
- Edited by: Suresh Urs
- Music by: R P Patnaik
- Release date: 8 August 2007
- Country: India
- Language: Kannada

Savi Savi Nenapu (Kannada: ಸವಿ ಸವಿ ನೆನಪು) (transl. Sweet memories) is a 2007 Indian Kannada film starring actor Prem and Mallika Kapoor. The title of the film is based on a song from My Autograph (2005).

== Story ==
Prem (played by Prem Kumar) passionately loves his classmate Preethi (Mallika Kapoor) and they get married. But destiny turns cruel towards them and Preethi passes away. Preethi's heart is transplanted to Pallavi (Tejaswini) who is also facing marital problems, as her husband is very career bound as a Model and is not able to keep Pallavi Happy. There is also a co-incidence that Pallavi's husband is identical to Prem. Prem does not want Preethi's heart to suffer and plans things in such a way that Pallavi remains happy. He impersonates himself as Pallavi's husband and spends quality time with her - which she is expecting very badly.

There comes a point when Pallavi's heart fails to adjust after transplantation and she has to be operated. Then Prem reveals about his impersonation to Pallavi's husband and he understands that all was done to keep Pallavi happy. He promises Prem that from now onwards he shall take good care of Pallavi, and try to keep her happy in life.

== Cast ==
- Prem Kumar as Prem and Raj
- Mallika Kapoor as Preethi
- Tejaswini Prakash as Pallavi
- Srinath
- Tulasi Shivamani

== Soundtrack ==
R P Patnaik devised the music for this movie.

| No. | Title | Lyrics | Singer(s) | Length |
|---|---|---|---|---|
| 1. | "Saviyo Saviyo" | Nagatihalli Chandrashekar. | Sonu Nigam, Shreya Ghoshal |
| 2. | "Naa Nanna Nanna" | | Karthik |
| 3. | "Haadu Haadu" | | Prem |
| 4. | "Savi Savi Nenapu" | | R. P. Patnaik |
| 5. | "Nenapu Nenapu" | | S. P. Balasubrahmanyam |
| 6. | "Kanuva Notave" | | Apoorva Sridhar |
| 7. | "Sooryanu Yee Divasa" | | Rajesh, Suneetha |

== Reception ==
A critic from The Times of India wrote that "Slow pace of narration, unnecessary flashbacks and a dull script have marred the film". A critic from Rediff.com opined that "The question is, is a sensitive story enough to make a film interesting? The answer is a big no. The film is a yawn". B S Srivani from Deccan Herald wrote "Only Avinash has more screen time. Pathaje fails to justify why there is no good music to play for Tejaswini who is a violinist in the film. And R P Patnaik’s music fails to evoke sweet memories, except in a couple of songs".
