= India vs England =

Indian Kannada-language Romantic thriller film

- Theatrical release poster
- Directed by: Nagathihalli Chandrashekar
- Screenplay by: Nagathihalli Chandrashekar
- Story by: Kanasu Nagathihalli
- Produced by: Y.N.Shankregowda & Friends
- Starring: Vasishta Simha; Manvitha; Ananth Nag; Sumalatha Ambareesh; Sadhu Kokila; K S Parameshwar; Prakash Belawadi; Michael Austin; Lex Lamprey
- Narrated by: Puneeth Rajkumar
- Cinematography: Will Price; Satya Hegde; AV Krishnakumar
- Edited by: Srikanth
- Music by: Arjun Janya
- Distributed by: Nagathihalli Cine Creations
- Release date: 24 January 2020
- Running time: 137 minutes
- Country: India
- Language: Kannada

India vs England is an Indian Kannada-language romantic thriller film directed by Nagathihalli Chandrashekar and produced by Y. N. Shankaregowda and several non-resident Indians (NRIs) from the UK and other countries. The film stars Vasishta N. Simha and Manvitha. It was released on 26 January 2020.

The film features Vasishta N. Simha as a British-born NRI and actor Anant Nag in a pivotal role. The music is scored by Arjun Janya and Will Price and Satya Hegde were in charge of cinematography.

== Plot ==
Kanishka is a vlogger from the UK, while Medini is a gemology apprentice. Kanishka comes to India. Initially, they don't like each other, but destiny makes them travel together across the country. On their journey, they come across a valuable gemstone which gets lost. The gem gets smuggled to England. How they fix things and realize their love for each other forms the crux of the story.

== Cast ==
- Vasishta N. Simha as Kanishka, a vlogger in the UK
- Manvitha Harish as Medini, Gemology Apprentice
- Anant Nag as Gemologist
- Sumalatha as Kanishka's mother
- Prakash Belawadi as Kanishka's father
- Siri Hampapur as Nisha, Kanishka's sister
- Sadhu Kokila
- Gopal Kulkarni
- Lex Lamprey as Rupert
- Sal Yusuf as John
- Nagathihalli Chandrashekar in a cameo
- Michael Fields body guard
- Mathew Doman. body guard
- Chris Woods Auctioneer

== Production ==
Half of the film was shot in the U.K. Four songs are shot in London, Cardiff, and Wales in the U.K. An aide-memoire of British rule in India; shot in historical places of India, such Ras Amritsar, Jhansi, Delhi, Jaipur, Mumbai, and Kittur. The film also features the Wagah Border Beating Retreat Ceremony and the Andaman Cellular Jail.

== Soundtrack ==
India vs England

Soundtrack album by Arjun Janya
- Released: 2019
- Recorded: 2019
- Genre: Feature film soundtrack
- Label: Anand Audio

Arjun has been signed to compose the score and songs for the film.

Track list
No.	Title	Lyrics	Singer(s)	Length
1.	"Kannada Kali"	Mattur Nandakumar	Indu Nagaraj
2.	"London London"	Nagathihalli Chandrashekar	Sanjith Hegde
3.	"Seemateetavi Snehakura"	Nagathihalli Chandrashekar	Anuradha Bhat and Vyas Raj
4.	"Preeti Illade"	Nagathihalli Chandrashekar	Sanjith Hegde
5.	"Jai Jai Jai"	Nagathihalli Chandrashekar	Anirudha Shastri
