= Pon Kumaran =

Indian film writer and director

- Born: Chennai, India
- Other name: P. Kumar
- Occupations: Screenwriter, film director
- Years active: 2011–present
- Spouse: Tamilselvi
- Parent(s): Shanmugam pillai (father); Lakshmi (mother)

Pon Kumaran (also credited as P. Kumar) is an Indian film writer and director working predominantly in Kannada and Tamil films. He made his directorial debut with the blockbuster Kannada film Vishnuvardhana (2011) which got rave reviews and earned him many awards including a nomination at the Filmfare Awards. He has also penned the story and dialogues for the Rajinikanth starrer Lingaa (2014).

== Personal life ==
Kumaran is a Chennai based filmmaker and writer who worked as an assistant to many leading directors including K. S. Ravikumar for Aadhavan (2009) before making his own stint as an independent director.

== Filmography ==
=== As film director ===
Year	Title	Language	Notes
2011	Vishnuvardhana	Kannada	Credited as P. Kumar; SIIMA Award for Best Debutant Director; Sandalwood Star Award for Best Debut Director; Sandalwood Star Award for Best Screenwriter; Nominated, Filmfare Award for Best Director – Kannada; Also actor
2012	Chaarulatha	Kannada; Tamil	Adaptation of Alone; also lyricist
2014	Jai Lalitha	Kannada	Remake of Mayamohini
2014	Tirupathi Express	Kannada	Remake of Venkatadri Express
2015	Raja Rajendra	Kannada	
2017	Gowdru Hotel	Kannada	Remake of Ustad Hotel
2019	Yajamana	Kannada	SIIMA Award for Best Director
2025	Golmaal †	Tamil	Filming

=== As writer ===
Year	Title	Writer	Language	Notes
2014	Lingaa	Story, dialogues	Tamil	

=== Web series ===
Year	Title	Language	Platform	Note
2024	Goli Soda Rising	Tamil	Disney+ Hotstar	Episode 7-10
