= Preethiyalli Sahaja =

- Directed by: Ratnaja
- Written by: Ratnaja
- Screenplay by: Ratnaja
- Produced by: M. L. Venkatesh; R. S. Gnaanesh
- Starring: Surya; Raghu Mukherjee; Avanthika Mohan
- Cinematography: Anantha Urs
- Edited by: Suresh Urs
- Music by: Raviraj
- Production company: Nenapirali Movies
- Distributed by: GVK Cinemas
- Release date: 12 February 2016
- Running time: 155 minutes
- Country: India
- Language: Kannada

Preethiyalli Sahaja is a 2016 Indian Kannada-language romantic film written and directed by Ratnaja. The film is produced by R. S. Gnaanesh and M. L. Venkatesh under GVK Cinemas banner. The film stars newcomer Surya, Raghu Mukherjee, Avanthika Mohan in the lead roles along with Suhasini Maniratnam and Devaraj in the supporting roles. The music is composed by Raviraj.

== Cast ==
- Surya
- Raghu Mukherjee
- Avantika Mohan
- Devaraj
- Suhasini Maniratnam
- Avinash
- Sharath Lohitashwa
- Ninasam Ashwath
- Sanketh Kashi

== Soundtrack ==
Preethiyalli Sahaja

Soundtrack album by Raviraj
- Released: November 2015
- Recorded: 2015
- Genre: Feature film soundtrack
- Label: Anand Audio

Raviraj, a protege of composer Hamsalekha, has composed the songs and soundtrack for the film. He has also written the lyrics of all the songs except one which is written by V. Manohar.

No.	Title	Performer(s)	Length
1.	"Ee Olavu"	Rajesh Krishnan
2.	"Sundarangiye"	Santhosh Kumar
3.	"Sahaja Sahaja"	Rajesh Krishnan
4.	"Priyathame"	Anand, Anuradha Bhat
5.	"Male Baruva Munna"	Chetan Sosca
6.	"Araluthide"	Yazin Nizar
7.	"Common Common"	Raviraj

== Reception ==
A critic from The Times of India wrote that " If you are game for 90s like love sagas, which induce unintentional laughs and have many improbable situations, then this one is for you".
