= Ratnaja =

- Other names: Prakash, Rathnaja Prakash
- Known for: Kannada Movies
- Awards: Best Director 2005-06 Karnataka State Film Awards

Ratnaja is a Kannada movie writer and director. He debuted his career as a director with the 2005 hit movie Nenapirali which won four awards at the 2005-06 Karnataka State Film Awards, including the Best Director award.

== Early life and background ==
Ratnaja was a Mechanical Engineering student at the National College of Engineering, Mysuru. Ratnaja then trained under many acclaimed directors like Dinesh Baboo and SV Rajendra Singh Baboo for five years as assistant.

== Career ==
Ratnaja began his direction career with the film Nenapirali. The film starred four relatively fresh faces - Prem Kumar who received a new lease of life with this movie, Naveen Krishna, Vidya Venkatesh and Varsha. Nenapirali focused on the youth and their confusion about love, and was critically and commercially a success. The film won awards at the Filmfare Awards that year (2005–06), and also picked up a couple of State Awards. Ratnaja was called, by certain quarters, as Kannada's Mani Ratnam. His next film was called Honganasu. He repeated the same leads - Prem and Naveen Krishna. The film also had music by the maestro Hamsalekha. The film released in early 2008 amidst much fanfare, but it failed to live up to expectations of both critics and audience. The criticism leveled against Ratnaja was weak narration, and the audience refused to humour the film. Ratnaja later made a film titled Premism which again was not very well received by the audience. His next film is titled Preethiyalli Sahaja and was released in 2016.

== Filmography ==
Year	Film title	Notes
2005	Nenapirali	Won - Filmfare Award for Best Director
2008	Honganasu	
2010	Premism	
2016	Preethiyalli Sahaja	

== See also ==
- Nenapirali
