= Jothe Jotheyali =

- Directed by: Dinakar Thoogudeepa
- Written by: Dinakar Thoogudeepa
- Produced by: Meena Thoogudeepa
- Starring: Prem; Ramya
- Cinematography: Venus Murthy
- Edited by: T. Shashikumar
- Music by: V. Harikrishna
- Release date: 22 September 2006
- Country: India
- Language: Kannada

Jothe Jotheyali is a 2006 Indian Kannada-language romance film directed by Dinakar Thoogudeepa and produced by Meena Thoogudeepa. The film stars Prem and Ramya. The music for the movie was composed by a debutante music composer V. Harikrishna. The film's title is based on a lyric of the song "Jotheyali Jothe Jotheyali" from Geetha (1981).

== Plot ==
Nakul (Prem) and Divya (Ramya) are married couples on the verge of divorce. As the movie starts both of the lead characters arrive at the Family court, to seek divorce. The actual movie unfolds in Flashback scenes as both remember - how they met and fell in love. They also face parental opposition for their marriage and they eventually marry against their wish and start a separate life altogether with their friends. Prem then starts an advertising firm. He is helped by Darshan Thoogudeep (in a mini guest appearance playing himself) for his first ad and eventually he becomes quite successful in his profession. He starts to neglect Divya and due to some mis-understanding is found with his colleague in a compromising position. Thus Divya abandons him and moves out of their home and goes to live with her parents. Prem tries unsuccessfully to woo Divya back with many tricks which fall flat and cause more tension on their relationship. Finally Divya understands her husband and returns to their home to see him in bed with another woman - which is the last blow for their relationship.

In the climax, Prem and Ramya are granted Divorce. While they are leaving the court, a criminal tries to flee from the policemen taking Divya as hostage, Prem fights to free her from the criminal and is stabbed to death. By now Divya realises Prem's true love for her and confesses the same at the hospital.

== Cast ==
- Prem as Nakul
- Ramya as Divya
- Sharan as Prem's friend
- Tharun Sudhir as Prem's friend
- Dwarkish as Divya's father
- Thulasi Shivamani as Divya's mother
- Avinash as Nakul's father
- Malathi Sardeshpande as Nakul's mother
- Darshan in a cameo appearance

== Soundtrack ==
Jothe Jotheyali

Soundtrack album by V. Harikrishna
- Released: 10 September 2006
- Genre: Feature film soundtrack
- Length: 28:09
- Label: Ashwini Recording Company

V. Harikrishna chronology
Jothe Jotheyali (2006)	Snehana Preethina (2006)

V. Harikrishna composed the film's background score and music for its soundtrack, with its lyrics written by V. Nagendra Prasad. The soundtrack album consists of six tracks.

Track listing
No.	Title	Lyrics	Singer(s)	Length
1.	"Kuline Kugoodilla"	V. Nagendra Prasad	Chaitra H. G.	4:32
2.	"O Gunavantha"	V. Nagendra Prasad	Sonu Nigam, Shreya Ghoshal	4:21
3.	"Punyakane"	V. Nagendra Prasad	S. P. Balasubrahmanyam	4:48
4.	"Sikthare Sikthare"	V. Nagendra Prasad	Karthik	4:37
5.	"Summane Summane"	V. Nagendra Prasad	Bombay Jayashree	4:46
6.	"Suryakannu"	V. Nagendra Prasad	Rajesh Krishnan	5:05
Total length:				28:09

== Reception ==
The movie ran to 100 days, even though directed by a debutante. People flocked to theaters to see the chemistry between the lead pair. The comedy by Sharan was also a plus point for the movie. V Hari Krishna became a popular music director after this movie. He also became permanent music director for the Thoogudeepa Productions banner and henceforth for all movies acted by Darshan.

=== Critical reception ===
Jothe Jotheyali received average to negative reviews from critics upon release on 22 September 2006. R. G. Vijayasarathy of IANS gave the film a rating of 2/5 and commented that even though the music of the film was good, it lacked a good story and narration. A critic from Rediff gave the film one out of five stars and noted that the film lacked a good story and neat narration.
