= Chigurida Kanasu =

- DVD cover
- Directed by: T. S. Nagabharana
- Written by: Dr. Shivaram Karanth
- Screenplay by: T. S. Nagabharana; Jayant Kaikini
- Produced by: Parvathamma Rajkumar
- Starring: Shiva Rajkumar; Anant Nag; Avinash; Vidhya Venkatesh; Rekha Unnikrishnan
- Cinematography: B. C. Gowrishankar
- Edited by: S. Manohar
- Music by: V. Manohar
- Distributed by: Sri Vajreshwari Films
- Release date: 2 October 2003
- Running time: 154 minutes
- Country: India
- Language: Kannada

Chigurida Kanasu (transl. Sprouted Dream) is a 2003 Indian Kannada-language drama film directed by T. S. Nagabharana and starring Shiva Rajkumar, Anant Nag, Vidhya Venkatesh, Rekha Unnikrishnan and Avinash. It is based on the 1951 novel of the same name by legendary Kannada litterateur and Jnanpith Award winner K. Shivaram Karanth.

The film was considered one of finest movies in the history of Kannada cinema. It is a milestone movie in the career of Shiva Rajkumar. Jayant Kaikini debuted as a lyricist, with his first song Bandhuve sung by the legendary Dr. Rajkumar. Kaikini would go on to become a very successful and popular lyricist in the Kannada film industry.

The story and characterisation of the lead role - an urban youth in search of his roots giving up his city life and deciding to stay back in a remote village and setting up a micro hydroelectric project to generate electricity for the benefit of the villagers - went on to be used in the 2004 Hindi film Swades whose story writer MG Sathya had revealed that he was swayed over by the Gandhian principles and the socio - political environment during his formative years while studying in Kannada medium school in Jalahalli, Bengaluru.

== Plot ==
B. Shankar (Shivarajkumar) is born and raised in Delhi. He is studying engineering at the Banaras Hindu University. He has a doting father B. Sundara Rao (Anant Nag) and a loud, annoying and a threatening mother. Shankar has a younger brother, a pilot. Shankar is content with his life, but something in his heart tells him this is not where he belongs. Shankar's girlfriend (who lives in Delhi) Varalakshmi (Vidhya Venkatesh) is a Kannadati. His college friend Seetharam (Raju Ananthaswamy) from Karnataka, teaches him Kannada to converse with Varalakshmi. When Shankar returns to Delhi, his mother plans to marry him off and he reluctantly agrees to meet his bride-to-be. In the party, during a conversation he realizes the letter "B" in his name is for "Bangaadi". But he doesn't know whether Bangaadi is a person or a town, and is curious about its significance. When Shankar is speaking in Kannada with his brother over the phone for fun, his father hears it. And his father says, "Speak in Kannada, my son. It has been so long since I have heard that language". Then, Shankar discovers he is a Kannadiga and is happy that he's at least found his origin. His father confesses that his father (Shankar's Grandfather) abandoned his native but he didn't try to go back even once. Shankar wants now to discover his native.

So, Shankar visits Seetharam's home. There he realizes that Bangaadi is a small village near Seetharam's home. Then, he plans to visit Bangaadi. There, Shankar meets his grand-aunt, an old, frail woman who is delighted to see her brother (Shankar's Grandfather) reincarnated before her eyes. She tells the story of her life, and what led Shankar's grandfather to flee. She shows him their family's land and asks him to help rebuild their house, which has fallen into disrepair. Shankar's grand-aunt's master, Shanbhog (Avinash), resents his arrival after all these years. He has a young, cheerful daughter Srimathi (Rekha Unnikrishnan), who teaches Kannada to the small kids around. Shankar seriously thinks about his grand-aunt's words.

Shankar returns to his home in Delhi with the news for his father, wanting to return to Bangaadi with his entire family (including Varalakshmi). However, none of them want to go with him. Varalakshmi, who is practising medicine refuses to come with him as her career is important to her.

When Shankar comes to Bangaadi, he initially faces many problems because of Shanbhog. But he somehow successfully builds a bridge across the river, sets up a micro hydro-electric project to generate electricity which can be used for fencing. He also starts to cultivate his land. He gets all the help for his work from Muttaiah (Krishnegowda). The love and respect that Shankar got from the village residents in a short span of time makes Shanbhog furious and envious of Shankar. Meanwhile, Srimathi loves him and dreams of a life with him.

Varalakshmi once arrives to Bangaadi, wishing to meet him. But Srimathi meets her and begs her to sacrifice her love for Srimathi. Varalakshmi does so and returns to Delhi with a broken heart.

Shankar's hard work gain him rewards and all the village people set off for a celebration for the crops harvesting time. During this time, Shankar's grandmother falls ill and breathes her last. Shanbhog also restricts Srimathi not to go out of their home. But her mother helps her escape out of her house. She arrives at Shankar's home. But at this time, she falls sick due to the plague. Shankar tries to take her to the city. But Shanbhog, in anger destroys the bridge. So, Srimathi breathes her last due to lack of medical treatment.

Finally, Shankar loses all hopes in his life and he is all set to leave Bangaadi to return to Delhi. Then, his father, mother and Varalakshmi come to him and say that they are ready to live with him in their native village, Bangaadi. His mother learns Kannada, Varalakshmi sets up a clinic in that village while Shanbhog, seriously shocked by his daughter's death becomes mentally challenged and begins to construct a bridge which he destroyed.

== Cast ==
- Shiva Rajkumar as Bangaadi Shankar
- Vidhya Venkatesh as Varalakshmi
- Rekha Unnikrishnan as Shrimathi
- Anant Nag as Bangaadi Sundar Rao
- Avinash as Shanubhoga Rangaraya
- Raju Ananthaswamy as Seetharam
- Ashok as Deputy Commissioner
- Sundar Raj as Tahasildar M Sundar Raj
- Krishnegowda as Muttaiah
- Rameshwari Varma as Ajji
- Pushpa Swamy as Shrimathi's mother
- Pankaj Tripathi as Shankar's college friend at BHU (uncredited)

== Production ==
Director T. S. Nagabharana and actor Shiva Rajkumar were coming together after their commercially successful collaboration, Janumada Jodi (1996). Chigurida Kanasu was launched on 8 February 2003. Nagabharana stated that the film required two leading females, and were yet to be signed. He added that the first schedule of the filming would begin in New Delhi, followed by Madikeri, "as the topography of the novel demands sloppy areas." Shiva Rajkumar's father, actor Dr. Rajkumar, revealed that he wanted to adapt the novel into a film 20 years earlier with him as actor. But, his wife insisted that their son should play the lead.

== Soundtrack ==
Chigurida Kanasu

Soundtrack album by V. Manohar
- Released: 13 August 2003
- Genre: Feature film soundtrack

Track #	Song	Singer(s)	Duration
1	"O Aajare"	Udit Narayan, Mahalakshmi Iyer	
2	"Bangara Tene Teneyella"	Shankar Mahadevan, Nanditha	
3	"Aha Enidenidenu"	Udit Narayan	
4	"A Aa Aaa E Ee Eee"	Shiva Rajkumar, Nanditha	
5	"Shubayoga Koodibanthamma"	Rajesh Krishnan, Nanditha	
6	"O Bandhuve"	Dr. Rajkumar	

== Reception ==
Although Chigurida Kanasu received critical acclaim, it did not do well at the box office. Chigurida Kanasu is now considered one of the best movies in the history of Kannada cinema. The role of Shankar done by Shivarajkumar in this movie is considered one of his most outstanding and brilliant performance. The idea of the protagonist loving his roots, going to his village and setting up a Micro Hydro-Electric project to generate electricity can also be seen in the Hindi cult classic Swades.

Nagabharana had revealed that when Swades appeared before him when he was a jury member for the selection of National Awards chairmaned by Sudhir Mishra, he expressed his opinion to his fellow jury members that he felt Swades to be a replica of his film in its core theme, plot elements and treatment and the members were in agreement to his contention.

== Awards ==
=== 2003–04 Karnataka State Film Awards ===
- First Best Film - Parvathamma Rajkumar
- Best Direction - T. S. Nagabharana
- Best Actor - Shiva Rajkumar
- Best Dialogues - Jayanth Kaikini
- Best Music - V. Manohar
