= Life Jothe Ondh Selfie =

- Theatrical Poster
- Directed by: Dinakar Thoogudeepa
- Written by: Manasa Dinakar
- Produced by: Samruddhi Manjunath
- Starring: Prem; Prajwal Devaraj; Hariprriya; Sudharani
- Cinematography: A. R. Niranjan Babu
- Edited by: K. M. Prakash
- Music by: V. Harikrishna
- Production company: Viraat Sai Creations
- Release date: 24 August 2018
- Country: India
- Language: Kannada

Life Jothe Ondh Selfie (transl. A selfie with life) is a 2018 Indian Kannada-language romantic drama film directed by Dinakar Thoogudeepa and written by his wife, Manasa Dinakar. Produced by Samruddhi Manjunath under Viraat Sai Creations banner, the film was released across Karnataka, India on 24 August 2018. Starring Prem, Prajwal Devaraj and Hariprriya, it also features Dhananjay and Sudharani in a supporting role. The film travels along the journey of three friends who face different situations as they travel along.The Music score and soundtrack were composed by V. Harikrishna and the cinematography is by A. R. Niranjan Babu.

== Plot ==
Nakul is a software engineer who aspires to be a director like Mani Ratnam and Puttanna Kanagal. Due to pressure mounted by his family, he leaves his house for a feel-good trip to Goa.

At Goa, he meets Rashmi aka Rash, a drunkard-but-independent woman, and Virat, an honest-young man, and they unknowingly reach an isolated island. They share their life stories. Rash reveals her issues with her fiancée Karthik's mother and that Karthik's first priority is his mother and not her. Thus she leaves for Goa. Virat reveals that his father is an industrialist, but has made his mother, Tulasi, a cook in his house and married another woman. It is revealed Virat is the illegitimate son of the industrialist and Tulasi actually became a cook as she didn't want Virat to lead a poor life. When Virat's fiancée humiliates Tulasi, he gets enraged and leaves the house.

The three become friends, and Nakul reunites Virat and Tulasi. They all enjoy their trip by playing watersports where Rash clears the misunderstandings with Karthik and the couple reunites. Nakul, Virat, and Rash encourages Tulasi to participate in a cooking competition as she has good taste in food. Though reluctant, Tulasi agrees, participates, and wins the competition. She delivers a speech about the difficulties of a woman which makes the industrialist realize his mistake and accept Tulasi as his wife.

== Cast ==
- Prem as Nakul
- Prajwal Devaraj as Virat
- Hariprriya as Rash alias Rashmi
- Raj Deepak Shetty as Industrialist, Virat's father
- Sudharani as Thulsi, Virat's mother
- Dhananjay as Karthik, Rash's fiancée
- Sadhu Kokila as John
- Aruna Balraj as Nakul's mother
- Chithra Shenoy as Karthik's mother

== Soundtrack ==
Life Jothe Ondh Selfie

Soundtrack album by V. Harikrishna
- Recorded: 2018
- Genre: Feature film soundtrack
- Label: Dbeats

V. Harikrishna has composed the songs for the film under his audio label, Dbeats. The lyrics for the songs are written by Kaviraj, V. Nagendra Prasad, and Yogaraj Bhat. The audio was released in June 2018.

Track list
No.	Title	Lyrics	Singer(s)	Length
1.	"Akashada Kannadi"	Kaviraj	Santhosh Venky
2.	"Alakku Myaale"	Yogaraj Bhat	V. Harikrishna, Indu Nagaraj
3.	"Onde Sala"	V. Nagendra Prasad	Santhosh Venky
4.	"Goodu"	Kaviraj	Prem Kumar
5.	"Kennege"	Kaviraj	Santhosh Venky
6.	"Marava Belasida"	V. Nagendra Prasad	Prem Kumar
