= Sharan (actor) =

Indian actor (born 1972)

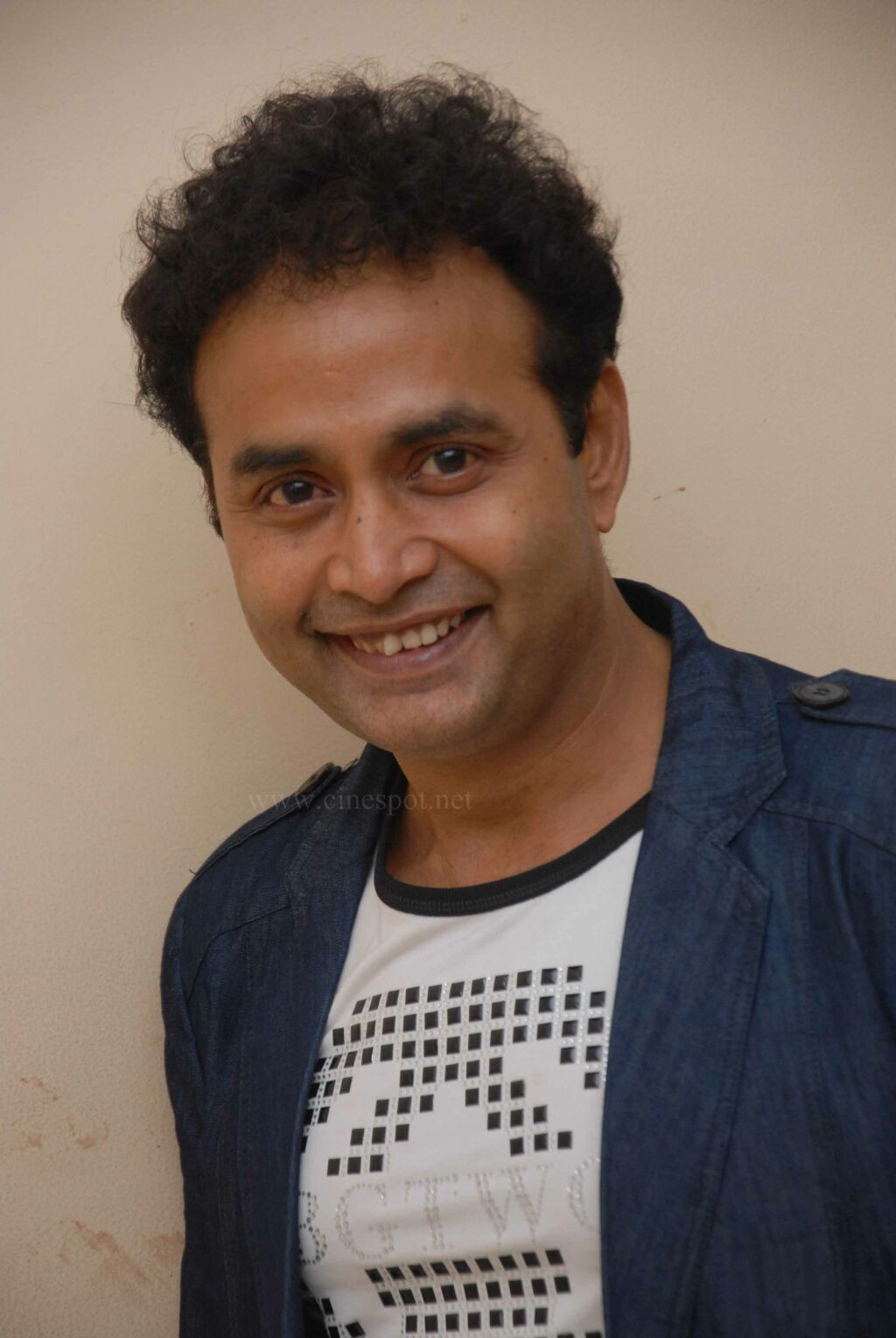
- Born: 6 February 1972 (age 54)
- Occupations: Actor, playback singer, film producer
- Years active: 1996–present
- Spouse: Palavi Sharan
- Children: 2
- Family: Shruti (sister)

Sharan (born 6 February 1972) is an Indian actor and an occasional playback singer and film producer who works in Kannada cinema. He made his acting debut in the mid-1990s and appeared mostly in comedy roles and small supporting roles. However, he earned much recognition during the late 2000s and made his lead role for his 100th film Rambo and since then featuring as the lead actor in comedy films.

== Personal life ==
Sharan was born into a family of theater artists. His grandparents and parents were reckoned artistes at the Gubbi theater. His younger sister Shruthi, is an actress. He has another younger sister. Though he was pushed to acting genre by his parents, his initial interest was in music and was part of an orchestra as a singer. He cut his own private devotional albums and also sang the title tracks for television series. Sharan's first tryst in acting began with a television series aired in Doordarshan channel. Subsequently he began to get offers to act in various television serials resulting in director S. Mahendar spotting his talent and offer him a small comedy role for his film Karpoorada Gombe.

== Career ==
Sharan made his acting debut with a small role in S. Mahendar's Karpoorada Gombe (1996). Since then he featured in over 100 films as a comedian and supporting actor. He was mostly noticed for his comic flavor in films such as "Asura" (2001), Friends (2002), Monalisa (2004), Jothe Jotheyali (2006), Pallakki (2007), Maleyali Jotheyali (2009) among several others.

=== 2012–present ===
Sharan appeared in noticeable lead roles in Rambo (2012) and Victory (2013); both films received critical and commercial successes, with his performance winning acclaim alongside.

In his first film of 2014, Maanikya, Sharan appeared in a supporting role. In the comedy Jai Lalitha, he was cast as Jayaraj and appeared in female character as well. G. S. Kumar of The Times of India wrote, "It's all Sharan who shines in lady character with excellent mannerism, dialogue delivery and body language." The film however performed average at the box-office. In his final release of the year, Adyaksha, a romance-comedy, and a remake of the Tamil film Varuthapadatha Valibar Sangam (2013), he was cast as Chandrashekhara Gowda, and along with his sidekick Narayana (played by Chikkanna), played the role of a villager who creates havoc in the village as the president of an association "Chi Thu Sangha" ("Chinthe Illada Thund Haikla Sangha"), who then falls in love with a landlord's daughter. The film emerged as a major commercial and critical success, with critics acclaiming Sharan's performance. It turned out to be one of Kannada cinema's biggest commercial successes of 2014. His performance earned him a Filmfare Award for Best Actor nomination.

In 2015, Sharan starred in Raja Rajendra as Bottle Mani, who takes a contract to kill an elder member of the royal family. The film received mixed reviews from critics, though his performance was praised. He was cast in a double role in the comedy Bullet Basya as Basavaraj "Basya", a Royal Enfield Bullet-riding villager, who has a proclivity for women, and Muthu, his exact opposite. He also sang the song "Kaal Kg Kallekaai" for the film. The film received mostly negative reviews from critics. On Sharan's performance, Bangalore Mirror wrote, "Sharan has almost gone overboard in search of comedy, but does justice to the two roles."

== Partial filmography ==
=== As actor ===
Key
†	Denotes films that have not yet been released

Year	Film	Role	Notes
1996	Karpoorada Gombe		
1999	Prema Prema Prema		
1999	Arunodaya		
1999	Snehaloka	Gopi	
2000	Nan Hendthi Chennagidale	Murali Krishna	
2001	Asura	Billa	
2001	Chitra		
2001	Chitte	Putnarsa	
2001	Yuvaraja	Kutty	
2002	Friends	Sharan	
2002	Ninne Preethisuve	Rajesh	
2002	Devaru Varavanu Kotre	Sharan	
2003	Ananda		
2003	Kaun Banega Kotyadipathi		
2003	Kushalave Kshemave	Sathya	
2003	Gadibidi Brothers		
2004	Baithare Baithare	Gopi	
2004	Monalisa	Sharan	
2004	Rowdy Aliya	Sripathi	
2004	Sarvabhouma		
2004	Aliya Mane Tholiya		
2005	Jootata		
2005	Aham Premasmi		
2005	Sirichandana	Sharan	
2005	Thunta	Gopalakrishna's friend	
2006	7 O' Clock	Rahul's friend	
2006	Hatavadi		
2006	Tananam Tananam		
2006	Jothe Jotheyali		
2007	Sixer		
2007	Pallakki		
2007	Krishna	Rama	
2007	Snehanjali		
2007	Ganesha		
2007	Gunavantha		
2007	Ee Preethi Yeke Bhoomi Melide		
2008	Honganasu		
2008	Sundari Ganda Sadananda	Sadananda	
2008	Vasanthakala		
2008	Ganga Kaveri	Arjun's friend	
2008	Akka Thangi		
2008	Kodagana Koli Nungitha		
2009	Maleyali Jotheyali	Venkatesh	
2009	Jhossh		
2009	Ee Sambhashane		
2009	Love Guru		
2009	Male Barali Manju Irali		
2009	Mr. Painter	Shiva	
2010	Gaana Bajaana		
2010	Eradane Maduve		
2010	Aithalakkadi		
2010	Bombat Car		
2010	Eno Onthara	Dance Master	
2010	Premism		
2010	Hoo		
2010	Porki		
2010	Nooru Janmaku		
2010	Punda		
2010	Modalasala		
2010	Bindaas Hudugi		
2011	Olave Mandara		
2011	Kempe Gowda	Pashupathi	
2011	Sanju Weds Geetha	Sanju's uncle	
2011	Mathond Madhuvena		
2011	Kool...Sakkath Hot Maga		
2011	Johny Mera Naam Preethi Mera Kaam		
2011	Bhadra		
2012	Aarakshaka		
2012	Parijatha		
2012	Lucky	Aanand / 420	
2012	Rambo	Krishna Murthy "Kitty"	Also producer
2012	Ondu Kshanadalli	Seena	
2013	Ee Bhoomi Aa Bhanu		
2013	Varadanayaka	Hari's friend	
2013	Neenandre Ishta Kano		
2013	Bulbul	Bobby	
2013	Victory	Chandru / Munna	Dual role
2014	Hara		
2014	Jai Lalitha	Jayaraj	
2014	Maanikya		
2014	Adyaksha	Chandrashekhara Gowda "Chandru"	
2015	Raja Rajendra	Bottle Mani / Raja Rajendra	Dual role
2015	Bullet Basya	Basavaraj "Basya" / Muthu	Dual role
2016	Jai Maruthi 800	Jeeva	
2016	Nataraja Service	Nataraja	
2017	Raj Vishnu	Rajvishnu	
2017	Satya Harishchandra	Satya Harishchandra	
2018	Raambo 2	Krishna "Krish"	
2018	Victory 2	Chandru / Munna / Salim / Richie	Four roles
2019	Adyaksha in America	Ullas	
2022	Avatara Purusha: Part 1	Anila (Karna)	
2022	Guru Shishyaru	Manohar	
2024	Avatara Purusha 2	Anila (Karna)	
2025	Choo Mantar	Dynamo/Gautham	
2025	Rajadrohi	Madhu alias Uppakadle	
2026	Ramarasa †	Indira Devendra	

=== As playback singer ===
Year	Film	Song
2015	Raja Rajendra	"Madhyana Kanasinalli"
2015	Vajrakaya	"Thukatha Gadabada"
2015	Bullet Basya	"Kaal Kg Kallekaai"
2016	Dana Kayonu	"Haalu Kudida Makkale"
2024	Maryade Prashne	"Easy Take it Easy"

== Awards and nominations ==
Filmfare Awards South

- 2009: nominated, Best Supporting Actor – Kannada: Josh
- 2012: nominated, Best Supporting Actor – Kannada: Parijatha
- 2014: nominated, Best Actor – Kannada: Adyaksha

South Indian International Movie Awards

- 2012: nominated, Best Debutant Producer (Kannada): Rambo
- 2012: nominated, Best Male Debutant (Kannada): Rambo
- 2019: nominated, Best Actor in a Leading Role (Male) – Kannada : Raambo 2

Udaya Film Awards

- 2012: nominated, Best Debut Actor (Male): Rambo

Bangalore Times Film Awards

- 2012: Best Actor in a Comic Role: Rambo
