= Mathond Madhuvena =

- Directed by: Dinesh Baboo
- Written by: Dinesh Baboo
- Produced by: Umesh Banakar; Anil Menasinakayi
- Starring: Anant Nag; Suhasini Maniratnam; Naveen Krishna
- Cinematography: Suresh Byrasandra
- Music by: Giridhar
- Distributed by: Sandesh Combines
- Release date: 8 April 2011
- Country: India
- Language: Kannada

Mathond Madhuvena is a 2011 Kannada comedy film starring Anant Nag, Suhasini Maniratnam and Naveen Krishna in the lead roles. The film is a sequel to the 2010 hit film Eradane Maduve. The film has been directed and written by Dinesh Baboo and produced by Umesh Banakar and Anil Menasinakayi. Giridhar has composed the music.

== Cast ==
- Anant Nag as Vishwanath
- Suhasini Maniratnam as Malavika
- Jennifer Kotwal as Veena
- Tara
- Naveen Krishna
- M. S. Umesh
- Priyanka Chandra as Mrudula
- Sharan
- Raju Talikote
- Veena Sundar

== Reception ==
=== Critical response ===
A critic from The Times of India scored the film at 3 out of 5 stars and says "The rest of the story follows with excellent humourous [sic] plots and a good climax. While Naveen Krishna is super, Priyanka excels. The Tara- Sharan jodia tickles your funny bone. Anant Nag and Suhasini are gracious. Music by Giridhar Dewan and cinematography by Suresh Bhyrasandra is good". Sunayana Suresh from DNA wrote "And scripts like these can work as textbooks to aspiring scriptwriters and directors. With this film managing to strike that right chord, we wonder if there’d be a part three as well".
