= Kalatpadai =

- Directed by: J. Ramesh
- Written by: J. Ramesh
- Produced by: Chozha Ponnurangam
- Starring: Jai; Vidhya Venkatesh
- Cinematography: D. Sheenu
- Edited by: Rahu Bob
- Music by: Bharadwaj
- Production company: Chozha Creations
- Release date: 15 January 2003
- Running time: 145 minutes
- Country: India
- Language: Tamil

Kalatpadai (transl. Infantry) is a 2003 Tamil-language romantic drama film directed by J. Ramesh, making his directorial debut. The film stars newcomer Jai and Vidhya Venkatesh, with Radha Ravi, J. Livingston, Thalaivasal Vijay, Nithin Sathya, Rajsekhar, Jyothi, Thennavan and Kuyili playing supporting roles. It was released on 15 January 2003.

== Plot ==
Ram (Jai) is a carefree and jobless young man who mostly hangs out with his seven friends. They spend much of their time smoking cigarettes and teasing everyone, not thinking much about their future. One day, Ram meets his best friend Sridhar (Arun) at his house and encounters his soft-spoken sister Priya (Vidhya Venkatesh). Thereafter, Ram comes across Priya on multiple occasions. They eventually fall in love and end up dating. Thus, he distances himself from his friends' outings. He even reveals his love to three of his friends. When Sridhar and his family find out about their love affair, they ask Priya to forget him straight away. Being from an orthodox Hindu Brahmin family, they could not accept it because Ram was from another caste. Sridhar then fights with Ram for dating his sister and misusing his friendship. The group of friends splits into two groups: the first supports Ram and knows about his love before, while the second supports Sridhar and knows about his love now. Sridhar even beats up his sister at home for dating his friend, and her family becomes very strict with her. Later, Priya convinces Ram's friends to support their love. Ram and Priya have no choice but to get married in a hurry at the registrar's office with the help of Ram's parents and friends. After the secret marriage, Ram's father Janakiraman (Radha Ravi) advises him to find a job first, and then they will start their married life. The two families then decide to settle the problem once and for all. The film ends with Ram and Priya getting married as per the customs and with the blessings of both families.

== Cast ==
- Jai as Ram
- Vidhya Venkatesh as Priya
- Radha Ravi as Janakiraman, Ram's father
- Arun as Sridhar, Ram's friend
- J. Livingston as "Cut" Raj
- Thalaivasal Vijay as Deenadayalan
- R. Sekar as Priya's father
- Jyothi as Bhama, Priya's mother
- Thennavan as Priya's uncle
- Kuyili as Priya's aunt
- Anthony as Daniel, Ram's friend
- Vijayganesh as Ram's friend
- Santhosh as Ram's friend
- Amit Gupta as Ram's friend
- Riyaz as Ram's friend
- Sreeni as Ram's friend
- John Paul as John Paul
- Sampath Ram as Henchman

== Production ==
After producing Thalaivasal (1992), Amaravathi (1993) and Sathi Sanam (1997), producer Chozha Ponnurangam of Chozha Creations took a long sabbatical from films. Chozha Ponnurangam launched his new film titled "Kalatpadai". A youthful story centring round eight friends, J. Ramesh, who had apprenticed under director Selva, was chosen to direct the film. Newcomer Jai, who had completed his pilot's training and was all set to work for an airlines, signed to play the hero. Vidhya Venkatesh, an air hostess, who had already played a role in Panchathantiram (2002), was selected to play the female lead role. The supporting cast has Arun (Nithin Sathya), Vijayganesh, Antony (of Naiyandi Durbar fame), Livingston, Radha Ravi, Rajsekhar, Kai Thennavan, Jyoti, Thalaivasal Vijay and Kuyili.

== Soundtrack ==
Kalatpadai

Soundtrack album by Bharadwaj
- Released: 2003
- Recorded: 2002
- Genre: Feature film soundtrack
- Length: 36:41
- Producer: Bharadwaj

Bharadwaj chronology
Neenandre Ishta (2003)	Kalatpadai (2003)	Anbe Anbe (2003)

The music was composed by Bharadwaj, with lyrics written by Kamakodiyan, Snehan, Newton and J. Ramesh.

Track	Song	Singer(s)	Lyrics	Duration
1	"Machchaan Machchaan"	Mohan Vaidya, Timothy, Reshmi	J. Ramesh	4:12
2	"Kadhal Indru Theeyai"	S. P. Balasubrahmanyam	J. Ramesh	4:42
3	"Varudhu Varudhu"	Tippu, Timothy, Pop Shalini	Newton	5:05
4	"Maizhayoo Puyaloo"	Srinivas, Pop Shalini, Gopika Poornima	Snehan	4:58
5	"Kagitha Oodam"	Vijay Shankar, Simsomalraj	J. Ramesh	2:47
6	"Imaigalin Oorum"	Bharadwaj, Reshmi	J. Ramesh	5:05
7	"Manitha Manitha"	Krishnaraj	Kamakodiyan	5:08
8	"Penngalai Nambhadhae"	Timothy	J. Ramesh	2:40
9	"Rama Rama"	Reshmi	Bharadwaj	2:04

== Release ==
The film was originally planned to release in 29 November 2002 but was postponed to 15 January 2003 which coincided with the Thai Pongal festival. It opened alongside six other films, including Dhool, Chokka Thangam, Vaseegara, and Anbe Sivam.

=== Critical reception ===
S. R. Ashok Kumar of The Hindu gave the film a positive review citing that "credit must be given to director, J. Ramesh, who has written the story, for the screenplay and the artists for their performance. Ramesh's dialogue actually is the strength of the film" and that "both the new find Jai and Vidhu have given good accounts of themselves. They make a charming pair. The other new face Arun (Nithin Sathya) is promising". Malini Mannath said, "The director makes no pretensions of giving a great film, there are a couple of flaws in the narration too, but in totality it's a simple love story well told, that gives a good feeling in the end". Sify wrote "J.Ramesh, the director has liberally borrowed from many earlier films of the same genre. Jai, the lanky newcomer has a future, but Vidhu has to improve. The music of Bharadwaj is the only saving grace in the other undernourished love story".

=== Box office ===
The film flopped at the box office.
