= Honganasu =

- Directed by: Ratnaja
- Written by: Rathnaja
- Produced by: Ajay Gowda
- Starring: Prem; Anjali; Anuradha Mehta; Anant Nag
- Cinematography: Ananth Urs
- Edited by: B. S. Kemparaju
- Music by: Hamsalekha
- Production company: Nenapirali Movies
- Release date: 18 January 2008
- Running time: 164 minutes
- Country: India
- Language: Kannada

Honganasu is a 2008 Indian Kannada-language romance film written and directed by Ratnaja of Nenapirali fame. The film stars Prem Kumar in lead role whereas debutant Anjali and Anuradha Mehta play the female leads. Ananth Nag plays an important role in the film.

== Cast ==
- Prem Kumar as Sagar
- Anjali as Impana
- Anuradha Mehta as Sowmya
- Ananth Nag
- Vinaya Prasad
- Ramesh Bhat
- Naveen Krishna
- Sharan
- Chitra Shenoy
- Shobharaj as Gounder Gowda
- Adarsha as Santosh
- Jayashri Raj as Shilpa

== Soundtrack ==
No.	Title	Lyrics	Singer(s)	Length
1.	"Lagge Lagge Sahyadrige"	Hamsalekha	Karthik, K. S. Chithra
2.	"Kuvari Kuvari"	Hamsalekha	Rajesh Krishnan
3.	"Chigurodeda"	Hamsalekha	Shreya Ghoshal
4.	"Baa Nagu Nannondige"	Hamsalekha	Vijay Yesudas, K. S. Chithra
5.	"Kandukonde"	Hamsalekha	Hemanth Kumar, Shreya Ghoshal
6.	"Honganasu"	Hamsalekha	Shaan

== Reception ==
A critic from The Times of India wrote that "Prem has done a neat job with a role which suits him perfectly. Anant Nag is graceful. Anuradha and Anjali have given their best. Sharan excels in comical sequences. Hamsalekha is the master of the film with his excellent numbers". R. G. Vijayasarathy of Rediff.com wrote that "Nenapirali Prem, who had some bad releases recently, acts well and looks cute in the songs. Anuradha Mehta, on the other hand is seen looking morose throughout the film. In contrast, newcomer Anjali is a delight. Sharan and Shobharaj are good in the comedy sequences".
