= Eradane Maduve =

- DVD cover
- Directed by: Dinesh Baboo
- Written by: Dinesh Baboo
- Produced by: K. A. Suresh
- Starring: Ananth Nag; Suhasini Maniratnam; Tara; Jennifer Kotwal
- Release date: 9 July 2010
- Country: India
- Language: Kannada

Eradane Maduve (transl. Second Marriage) is a 2010 Indian Kannada-language comedy film directed by Dinesh Baboo starring Ananth Nag, Suhasini Maniratnam, Tara and Jennifer Kotwal.

The film was remade in Telugu in 2011 as Bhale Mogudu Bhale Pellam starring Rajendra Prasad. The movie had a sequel titled Mathond Madhuvena released in 2011.

== Cast ==
- Ananth Nag as Vishwanath
- Suhasini Maniratnam as Malavika
- Jennifer Kotwal as Veena
- Tara
- Sharan
- Prem
- Rangayana Raghu

== Production ==
The film was shot in about ten to twenty days.

== Soundtrack ==
"O Ranga Panduranga"

== Release ==
The film was released simultaneously in all the major cities of India by its distributors, PVR Pictures.

== Reception ==
=== Critical response ===
A critic from The Times of India scored the film at 3.5 out of 5 stars and says "While Anant Nag and Suhasini are at their best, Navya makes an impressive debut with a very dignified performance. Prem and Jennifer Kotwal have done justice to their roles. Music by Jayapal is average". A critic from Deccan Herald wrote "The still-handsome Anant Nag takes the audience on a delightful roller-coaster, with Sharan and Suhasini tagging along. Rangayana Raghu is restricted, Tara loud and Jennifer subdued - a delightful situation for a change. The biggest culprit however is the climax which seems forced. Still, like second marriages go, “Eradane Maduve” is not a total loss". A critic from Bangalore Mirror wrote "Anant Nag and Suhasini come out with good performances. Jennifer and Rangayana Raghu shine in their limited roles. Tara gets a comic role. However, Sharan seems to be aping comic Sadhu Kokila in his role. The film is worth a watch for its comedy!".
