= Pallakki =

- Directed by: K. Narendra Babu
- Written by: Paramesh
- Produced by: Prem Kumar
- Starring: Prem; Ramnitu Chaudhary; Doddanna
- Cinematography: Mahesh Thalakad
- Edited by: Girish Kumar. K
- Music by: Gurukiran
- Production company: P2 Productions
- Release date: 4 May 2007
- Running time: 141 minutes
- Country: India
- Language: Kannada

Pallakki is a 2007 Indian Kannada-language romantic drama film directed by K. Narendra Babu and written by Paramesh. The film stars Prem and newcomer Ramnitu Chaudhary. The film was produced by P2 Productions.

The film was released on 4 May 2007 to generally negative reviews from critics. The film failed commercially at the box-office. The critics commented that the film had poor script and presentation was equally poor.

== Cast ==
- Prem as Lakshmikanth
- Ramanithu Chaudhary as Prarthana
- Doddanna
- Ramesh Bhat
- Sumithra
- Sharan
- Bullet Prakash
- Biradar
- Divya Shridar

== Soundtrack ==
The music of the film was composed by Gurukiran.

Pallakki

Soundtrack album by Gurukiran
- Released: April 2007
- Genre: Feature film soundtrack
- Label: Jhankar Music

| No. | Title | Lyrics | Singer(s) | Length |
|---|---|---|---|---|
| 1. | "Avva Kano Kannada" | Shivananje Gowda | S. P. Balasubrahmanyam |
| 2. | "Kannallu Neenene" | V. Manohar | Gurukiran |
| 3. | "O Priya" | Kaviraj | K. S. Chitra |
| 4. | "O Priya" | Kaviraj | Aslam Mustafa |
| 5. | "Bidu Bidu" | Hrudaya Shiva | Rajesh Krishnan, Chaitra H. G. |
| 6. | "Goli Maaro" | Kaviraj | Karthik |
| 7. | "Intha Shaapa" | Kaviraj | Chetan Sosca |

== Awards ==
- Filmfare Award for Best Lyricist – Kannada - V. Manohar for "Kannallu Neenene"
- Udaya Award for Best Male Playback Singer - Gurukiran for "Kannallu Neenene"
