= Gunavantha =

- Directed by: Raghuvardhan
- Written by: Raghuvardhan
- Produced by: Muniraju Malleshanapalya
- Starring: Prem Kumar; Rekha Vedavyas; Rangayana Raghu
- Cinematography: K. S. Chandrashekar
- Edited by: K. M. Prakash
- Music by: Hamsalekha
- Production company: Sri Veeranjaneya Swami Productions
- Release date: 30 November 2007
- Running time: 144 minutes
- Country: India
- Language: Kannada

Gunavantha is a 2007 Kannada romance film directed by Raghuvardhan and starring Prem Kumar and Rekha Vedavyas in the lead roles with Sharan and Rangayana Raghu in other pivotal roles. The film had musical score and lyrics written by Hamsalekha.

The film opened on 30 November 2007 to mixed reviews and didn't perform well at the box-office.

== Cast ==
- Prem Kumar as Guna shekar
- Rekha Vedavyas as Uma
- Rangayana Raghu as Gold Reddy
- Sharan
- Avinash
- Chitra Shenoy as Padma
- Padmaja Rao
- Ramesh Bhat

== Soundtrack ==
The film's score and soundtrack was composed by Nadha brahma Hamsalekha.

All lyrics are written by Hamsalekha.

Track-list
No.	Title	Singer(s)	Length
1.	"Kolle Nanna"	Rajesh Krishnan, K. S. Chithra
2.	"Chandira O Chandira"	Vijay Yesudas
3.	"Hogu Hogu"	Harish Raghavendra, K. S. Chithra
4.	"Chaaku Choori"	Chaitra H. G.
5.	"Nanmele Kopa Yake"	Rajesh Krishnan, Anuradha Bhat
6.	"Oppisu"	Rajesh Krishnan
