= Mast Mohabbat =

- One Life... One Love...
- Directed by: Mohan Malagi
- Written by: S. Venugopala
- Screenplay by: S. Venugopala
- Produced by: V. Shekar
- Starring: Prem; Poonam Bajwa
- Cinematography: Vijay C. Kumar
- Edited by: K. M. Prakash
- Music by: Mano Murthy
- Production company: Manasa Movies
- Release date: 22 January 2016
- Running time: 124 min
- Country: India
- Language: Kannada

Mast Mohabbat is a 2016 Indian Kannada-language romance film written by S. Venugopala and directed by Mohan Malagi making his debut. It stars Prem and Poonam Bajwa. The music is composed by Mano Murthy. The film is produced by V. Shekar under Manasa Movies banner.

== Cast ==
- Prem as Sri
- Poonam Bajwa as Maya
- Naveen Krishna
- Chikkanna
- Raju Thalikote
- Shakeela
- Swayamvara Chandru

== Production ==
Debutant director Mohan Malagi, an assistant to acclaimed director duo Dorai-Bhagwan, who hails from Raichur district, came up with a love script written by S. Venugopla (Techie by profession then) and roped in Prem as the lead protagonist. Initially, actress Vandana Gupta was roped in for the female lead. However, due to the date clashes, she dropped out from the film and then Poonam Bajwa replaced her for the role. The major portion of the shoot took place at Ooty and Mysore locations.

== Soundtrack ==
Mast Mohabbat

Soundtrack album by Mano Murthy
- Released: 27 August 2015
- Genre: Feature film soundtrack
- Length: 30:38
- Label: Times Music

Mano Murthy chronology
Abhinetri (2014)	Mast Mohabbat (2015)

Mano Murthy composed the film's background score and the soundtrack, lyrics for which was penned by K. Kalyan, Jayant Kaikini and Raghu Shastry. The soundtrack album consists of eight tracks. It was released on 27 August 2015 in Bangalore.

=== Track listing ===
No.	Title	Lyrics	Singer(s)	Length
1.	"Hey Mohabbat"	K. Kalyan	Hemanth Kumar, Anuradha Bhat	4:23
2.	"Endo Kaanada"	Jayanth Kaikini	Sonu Nigam	4:54
3.	"Arithe Sandesha"	K. Kalyan	Shreya Ghoshal	4:00
4.	"Belakina Hoovanthe"	Jayant Kaikini	Sonu Nigam	1:29
5.	"Its time for Mohabbat"	Raghu Shastry	Vijay Prakash	3:40
6.	"Naana Bannada"	Jayant Kaikini	Shreya Ghoshal	4:55
7.	"Iniyana"	Raghu Shastry	Ritisha Padmanabh	2:09
8.	"Arulu Marulu"	Raghu Shastry	S. P. Balasubrahmanyam	5:08
Total length:				30:38
