= I Am Sorry Mathe Banni Preethsona =

- Film Poster
- Directed by: Ravindra H P Das
- Written by: Ravindra H P Das
- Produced by: Vinay Narkar; Ravindra H P Das
- Starring: Prem Kumar; Karishma Tanna; Sanjjana
- Cinematography: Ashok Cashyap
- Edited by: Bala Balraj
- Music by: Anoop Seelin
- Release date: 17 June 2011
- Running time: 136 minutes
- Country: India
- Language: Kannada

I Am Sorry Mathe Banni Preethsona (transl. I'm sorry, come fall in love again) is a 2011 Indian Kannada-language romantic film directed by Ravindra H P Das . It stars Prem Kumar, Karishma Tanna (in her debut as lead) and Sanjjana in lead roles. The film revolves around a man's disparaging remarks about a woman's morals lead to a series of unexpected revelations. Shyam is happily married to Chetana when he happens to meet Sinchna who runs a brothel. When he insults Sinchna, she issues him a moraility challenge that Shyam accepts.

The music is composed by Anoop Seelin . Vinay Narkar has jointly produced the film with Ravindra. The film released on 17 June 2011. Ravindra H.P. Das got the Best Screenplay Award from Karnataka State Film Awards for the movie.

== Synopsis ==
Shyam and his wife Chetana are leading a happy and contented life. Their life is going at a smooth pace until Shyam finds a mobile, which introduces him to a high tech brothel owner Sinchana. As he goes to give the mobile to Sinchana, the situation leads him to take a challenge from her. While he is on his way to complete the challenge, circumstances once again force him to doubt that his wife is a prostitute. What happens next will form an interesting part of the film.

== Cast ==
- Prem Kumar as Shyam
- Karishma Tanna as Chetana
- Sanjjana as Sinchana
- Tabla Nani
- Sumithra
- Vinaya Prasad
- Dileep Raj
- Amritha Chabria
- Anand
- Kritika Pandey
- Manoj Karthik
- Yukti Kapoor
- Gaurish Akki
- Srinagar Kitty in a special appearance
- Nidhi Subbaiah in a special appearance

== Soundtrack ==
Anoop Seelin composed the soundtrack and score for the film. The lyrics have been written by Arasu Anthare, V. Nagendra Prasad, Guruprasad, Shankar Guru, Janamitra Anand and the director Ravindra H. P.

Sl No.	Song title	Singers
1	"Akka Pakkadavaru"	Vasundhara Das
2	"Zoozoobaa"	Vedala Hemachandra, Anuradha Bhat
6	"Subhan Allah Re"	Anoop Seelin, Shankar Mahadevan
4	"Shuruvayithu"	Keerthi Sagathia, Arasu Anthare
5	"Utthamanu Utthamanu"	Keerthi Sagathia
3	"Hula Hula"	Keerthi Sagathia
7	"Eno Madalu Hogi"	Keerthi Sagathia
8	"Onchooru Onchooru"	Vijay Prakash, Sunitha
9	"Haayagi Iru Nee Alle"	Keerthi Sagathia
10	"Kuni Kuni"	Sunidhi Chauhan, Arasu Anthare

== Reception ==
=== Critical response ===
A critic from The Times of India scored the film at 4 out of 5 stars and wrote "Prem is back to his form, Karishma is credible as his wife. It's Sanjana's performance as a sex worker that adds drama to the story. Anoop Seelin's foot-tapping tunes will impress the youth. Ashok Kashyap's cinematography is commendable". Shruti Indira Lakshminarayana from Rediff.com scored the film at 2.5 out of 5 stars and says "Gurprasad's dialogues -- romantic, philosophical and comic -- will draw whistles. Anup Silin's songs are a definite advantage. Ashok Kashyap handle's the camera well. If you are a Prem fan and are bored of the run of the mill romantic stories, go find out for yourself". A critic from The New Indian Express wrote "His dialogues are meaningful. Cinematographer Ashok Kashyap has done a neat job behind the camera. Anup Seelin has composed foot-tapping tunes. Songs are good, especially the song —‘Joojuba Joojuba’ — is hummable. The movie is worth watching for all, especially husbands who suspect their sincere and loving wives". B S Srivani from Deccan Herald wrote "Camerawork too measures up to expectations. But for a climax that drags and cheap gimmicks prior to the release, Matthe Banni Prithsona is quite an interesting offering". A critic from News18 India wrote "Anoop Sileen has given different tunes for all the five songs of the film. Ashok Kashyap is as usual exceptional behind the camera. 'I'm Sorry Mathe Banni Preethsona' is a must watch".

=== Awards ===
- Karnataka State Film Award for Best Screenplay - Ravindra H. P
