= Jothegara =

- Directed by: Sigamani
- Written by: Sigamani
- Produced by: Ashwini Ram Prasad
- Starring: Prem; Ramya; Lakshmi; Ashish Vidyarthi; Sadhu Kokila
- Cinematography: N. Raghav
- Edited by: Deepu S. Kumar
- Music by: Sujeeth Shetty; Vardhaman
- Production company: Ashwini Entertainment Pvt Ltd
- Release date: 10 September 2010
- Running time: 131 minutes
- Country: India
- Language: Kannada

Jothegara is a 2010 Indian Kannada romance film written and directed by Sigamani and produced by Ashwini Ram Prasad. The film features Prem and Ramya in the lead roles.

The film was widely popular for its title song composed by Sujeeth Shetty upon release; however, the film failed to impress the critics.

== Cast ==
- Prem as Vishwas
- Ramya as Priya
- Lakshmi as Annapoorna
- Doddanna as Doddanna
- Ashish Vidyarthi as ACP Veerabhadra
- Sadhu Kokila
- Sudha Belawadi as Vishwas's mother
- Kuri Prathap
- Padmaja Rao as Rajeshwari
- Layendra
- Jennifer Kotwal as an item number

== Soundtrack ==
The music of the film was composed by Sujeeth Shetty. The title song was received extremely well and became very popular.

Track listing
No.	Title	Lyrics	Singer(s)	Length
1.	"Jotheyalli Nee Baaro"	Jayanth Kaikini	Shaan & Shreya Ghoshal
2.	"Sona Kannalle Kolthaale"	Kaviraj	Gurukiran & Sunaina
3.	"Yaake Yaake"	Jhamkandi Shivu	Shreya Ghoshal
4.	"Ondondu Ondondu"	Jayanth Kaikini	Kunal Ganjawala & Shreya Ghoshal
5.	"Jarthaari Seere"	Jhamkandi Shivu	Udit Narayan, Kalpana Patowary
6.	"Muthaiderella Seri"	Jhamkandi Shivu	Madhu Balakrishnan, K. S. Chithra

== Reception ==
Shruti Indira Lakshminarayana of Rediff.com scored the film at 1.5 out of 5 stars and says "Camera work by Raghav is particularly good in songs. Having said that there is nothing great about the introductory song over which the hero and the producer had clashed. You find yourself asking what the fuss was all about? Jotegaara is a predictable love story and given the delays it has encountered in its release, you are left to wonder if the wait was really worth it? ". A critic from The New Indian Express wrote "Prem looks convincing in his role. Ramya looks glamorous in the song sequences but there is little scope for her to showcase her acting skills. Veteran actor Ashish Vidyarthi comes out with a good performance as a police officer. Lakshmi impresses in her brief role. Rajendra Karanth and Petrol Prasanna look menacing in their negative roles". A critic from The Times of India scored the film at 3.5 out of 5 stars and wrote "Prem is good and emotes well. Ramya carries the story forward with her brilliant performance. Lakshmi and Ashish Vidyarthi are gracious. While cinematography by N Raghav is eye-catching, music by Sangeeth Shetty is okay". A critic from Bangalore Mirror wrote "Though the storyline is old, tried and tested, the director has, one should say, taught the old dog some new tricks. However, the narration is marred by some ugly use of scissors on the editing table, which has scarred the final output a wee bit. Cinematography by N Raghav's (from across the border) has an appealing cadence, complemented by melodious music by Suchit Shetty. Watch out for the title song Jotheyagi nee baro jothegara...it is a charbuster".
