= Jai Lalitha =

- Directed by: Pon Kumaran
- Story by: Udayakrishna-Siby K. Thomas
- Based on: Mayamohini
- Produced by: Indira; Arun Kumar; Manjula Shankar
- Starring: Sharan; Disha Pandey; Aishwarya Devan
- Cinematography: Karunakar
- Music by: Sridhar V. Sambhram
- Distributed by: Skyline Productions
- Release date: 27 June 2014
- Country: India
- Language: Kannada

Jai Lalitha is a 2014 Indian Kannada-language comedy film directed by Pon Kumaran. It stars Sharan, Aishwarya Devan, Disha Pandey and Ravishankar Gowda in the lead roles. The film is a remake of the Malayalam film Mayamohini (2012). Jai Lalitha released on 27 June 2014.

Previously titled Smt. Jayalalitha, the film met with controversies over the name coinciding with the name of the then Chief Minister of Tamil Nadu, Shri Jayalalithaa (d. 2016). Later, it was renamed as Jai Lalitha. However, the director clarified that the name has no connection with the chief minister and instead signifies the strong embodiment of the 'woman-in-disguise' character that Sharan was supposed to play.

== Cast ==
- Sharan as Jayaraj/Jai Lalitha
- Ravishankar Gowda as Lawyer Lakshmikantha
- Disha Pandey as Disha
- Aishwarya Devan as Lalitha
- T. S. Nagabharana as Srikantaiah
- Harish Raj as Yogi
- Sayaji Shinde as Raghav
- Chandrakala Mohan as Doctor Chandrakala
- Sadhu Kokila as Doctor's husband
- Tabla Nani as Govindu
- Kuri Prathap as Prathap
- [Mahabala ram]

== Production ==
Pon Kumaran, who tasted success with Vishnuvardhana and Chaarulatha, planned to remake the Malayalam hit film Mayamohini in Kannada. He approached actor Sharan and narrated the story to him while on the sets of Kempegowda. Sharan was initially reluctant to appear in a female get-up. Later, he agreed upon the role and shed around 11 kilos in preparation. To get the external appearance right, he went through beauty treatments including facial, bleaching and threading. He stated that he lived like a woman for four months, trying to adopt feminine mannerisms by shutting himself at home and wearing his wife's clothes to practice.

Jai Lalitha was shot in Bangalore, Mysore and other areas of Karnataka.

== Soundtrack ==
The audio was launched on 26 May 2014 at hotel Citadel in Bangalore. Popular music director V. Harikrishna and director Dinakar Thoogudeep were present as the chief guest. Actor Upendra and director Yogaraj Bhat have recorded their voices for the soundtrack of the film. The music is composed by Sridhar V. Sambhram consisting of six tracks and all songs are written by Lokesh Krishna.

All lyrics are written by Lokesh Krishna.

| No. | Title | Singer(s) | Length |
|---|---|---|---|
| 1. | "Enivaaga Naanu Kannadiga" | Vijay Prakash, Yogaraj Bhat |
| 2. | "Dilge Dilge" | Ankit Tiwari, Supriya Lohith |
| 3. | "Sadarame" | Shankar Mahadevan |
| 4. | "Bedi Hachko" | Apoorva Sridhar, Sneha Ravindra |
| 5. | "Thorisabedammi" | Upendra, Apoorva Sridhar |
| 6. | "Kannada Savi Kannada" | Shashank Sheshagiri |

== Release ==
The film released on 27 June 2014. The distribution rights were taken up by Thoogudeepa Productions of actor Darshan and his brother Dinakar. Jai Lalitha was given a U/A certificate by the Regional Censor Board.

=== Critical reception ===
The Times of India gave 3 stars out of 5 and wrote, "Director P Kumar has selected a good subject with a focus on comedy. Even the script too deserves a pat. But as story opens up, there are too many characters and sequences that give new twists to the story. Though it is appreciable as all of them form part of the script, it is difficult to follow the sequences suddenly too many turns to the story crop up. Once the movie ends, it takes sometime for the audience to recap the narration. But director has mainatined [sic] the comedy to some extent in all sequences with dialogues and Sharan at his best". The New Indian Express wrote, "P Kumar seems to have definitely done justice to this remake of the Malayalam comedy flick Mayamohini. Sure to tickle your funny bones, Jai Lalitha is a one-time watch".

Deccan Chronicle wrote, "Though the hard work towards looking ‘like’ a woman reflects well in the posters, it does not replicate much in terms of performance and makes it a painful watch for over two hours. It is yet again a simple gimmick to draw the audience to theatres while the screenplay and other vital aspects lack substance for a decent entertainment".
