= Dinakar Thoogudeepa =

Indian director, actor and producer (born 1978)

- Born: 21 September 1978 (age 48); Mysore, Karnataka, India
- Occupations: Film director; actor; producer; Distributor
- Years active: 2006–present
- Father: Thoogudeepa Srinivas
- Relatives: Darshan Thoogudeepa (brother)

Dinakar Thoogudeepa (born 21 September 1978), mononymously known as Dinakar, is an Indian film director, actor and producer who works mainly in Kannada films, He started his film career as an actor and assistant director for few Kannada movies. He became director from the Kannada movie Jothe Jotheyali in 2006.

== Early life ==
Dinakar Thoogudeepa was born to actor Thoogudeepa Srinivas and Meena on 21 September 1978.

== Filmography ==
- All films are in Kannada language unless otherwise noted.

List of Dinakar Thoogudeepa film credits
Year	Title	Director	Actor	Writer	Co-Producer	Notes	Ref.
2004	Ayyo Pandu	No	Yes	No	No		
2006	Jothe Jotheyali	Yes	No	Yes	No		
2008	Navagraha	Yes	No	Yes	No		
2011	Sarathi	Yes	No	Yes	No		
2013	Bul Bul	No	No	No	Yes		
2017	Chakravarthy	No	Yes	No	No		
2018	Life Jothe Ondu Selfie	Yes	No	No	No		
2023	Kaiva	No	Yes	No	No		
2025	Royal	Yes	No	No	No		
