= Filmfare Award for Best Editor – South =

Indian annual film award

The Filmfare Award for Best Editor is given by the Filmfare magazine as part of its annual Filmfare Awards for South Indian films.

The award was first given in 2005.

Year	Editor	Film	Language
2005	Anthony Gonsalves	Ghajini	Tamil

== See also ==
- Filmfare Awards South
