= Nenapirali =

- Film poster
- Directed by: Ratnaja
- Screenplay by: Rathnaja
- Story by: Rathnaja
- Produced by: Ajay R. Gowda
- Starring: Vidhya Venkatesh; Prem Kumar; Varsha Kamesh
- Cinematography: H. M. Ramachandra
- Edited by: B. S. Kemparaju
- Music by: Hamsalekha
- Production company: Kalpana Shakthi
- Release date: 2 December 2005
- Running time: 143 minutes
- Country: India
- Language: Kannada

Nenapirali is a 2005 Indian Kannada language film directed by Ratnaja. It stars Vidhya Venkatesh, Prem and Varsha Kamesh. The supporting cast features Naveen Krishna, Ananth Nag, Jai Jagadish, Vijayalakshmi Singh and Vinaya Prasad.

At the 2005–06 Karnataka State Film Awards, the film won four awards: Second Best Film, Best Cinematographer (H. M. Ramachandra), Best Music Director (Hamsalekha) and Best Female Dubbing Artist (Amrutha Singh). The film also won five awards at the 53rd Filmfare Awards South, including the award for Best Film.

== Plot ==
The film begins by introducing Ekanth (Naveen Krishna), the only son of a rich industrialist Sundar Raj (Anant Nag). He lives in Bangalore and manages his father's business which keeps him extremely busy. Ekanth is in love with an introverted girl, Indushree (Vidhya Venkatesh), from Mysore, who feels that Ekanth is not interested in her and is not serious about marrying her. In order to test his intentions, Indu decides to lie to Ekanth that her parents are looking for suitable grooms to arrange her marriage. She mentions that her parents would prefer that she marry someone from a political background. Now Ekanth gets slightly worried by the turn of events and hatches a scheme to convince Indu's parents for their marriage. Enter Kishore (Prem Kumar), Ekanth's best friend, who Ekanth instructs to pretend being in love with Indu. Kishore is a middle class, simple boy who is very good at heart and agrees to Ekanth's request only to help his friend's love succeed. Reluctantly, Indu too agrees to participate in the false show of being in a relationship with Kishore. Since Indu's parents would disagree to Indu and Kishore's relationship (due to the societal differences), Ekanth thinks that his marriage proposal will be readily accepted in comparison to Kishore's. Everything goes as planned. However, Indu starts developing feelings towards Kishore while spending time with him. When she pours her heart out to Kishore, he immediately hastens conversations about Ekanth and Indu's marriage and eventually with everyone's consent, Indu and Ekanth get married. After Ekanth's marriage, Kishore, his mother and sister move to Mangalore to manage one of Ekanth's industry's branches located there.

Bindu (Varsha) is Indu's sister who has just graduated and would like to gain some work experience. She requests her brother-in-law, Ekanth for a short stint at one of his industry locations and he recommends that she work alongside Kishore in Mangalore. Bindu moves to Mangalore and as days go by, Kishore and Bindu start enjoying each other's company and eventually fall in love with each other. Suddenly one day, Ekanth meets with a car accident and passes away. Deeply saddened by the turn of events and his widowed daughter-in-law, Sundar Raj (Eknath's father) wants Indu to remarry. Upon her family's persuasion and a meeting with Kishore after a long time, the flames of love for Kishore are reignited in Indu's heart and she insists that she will only remarry if it is going to be with Kishore. Bindu is tasked with gaining everyone's acceptance on the matter, including Kishore's. Heartbroken, Bindu sets out on her mission and is ready to make the sacrifice for her sister's happiness. However, Kishore is very upset and tries as much as he can to dissuade Indu but to no avail. Indu expresses her love and interest in him once again, which Kishore refuses to accept. The climax of the movie is one that leaves audience happy, with Kishore and Bindu ultimately triumphing in their love. Indu isn't greatly pleased by this but accepts her destiny for her sister's happiness.

== Cast ==
- Prem Kumar as Kishore
- Vidhya Venkatesh as Indushree
- Varsha Kamesh as Bindushree
- Naveen Krishna as Ekanth
- Anant Nag as Ekanth's father
- Jai Jagadish as Indushree's father
- Vijayalakshmi Singh as Indushree's mother
- Vinaya Prasad
- Chitra Shenoy
- Sharan

== Soundtrack ==
Nenapirali

Soundtrack album by Hamsalekha
- Genre: Feature film soundtrack
- Length: 41:04
- Label: Kalpana Audio, Ashwini Audio

Hamsalekha composed the background score for the film and the soundtrack, also penning the lyrics for them. The soundtrack album consists of eight tracks.

Tracklist
No.	Title	Lyrics	Singer(s)	Length
1.	"Olavu Ontiyalla"	Hamsalekha	Chitra, Chetan Sosca, Ravishankar	6:08
2.	"Koorakk Kukkaralli Kare"	Hamsalekha	S. P. Balasubrahmanyam	5:20
3.	"Preethi Paatavalla"	Hamsalekha	Chitra, Chetan Sosca, Ravishankar	6:13
4.	"Draupadi Draupadi"	Hamsalekha	Sowmya Raoh, Annupamaa, Anoop Seelin	6:19
5.	"Indu Baanigella Habba"	Hamsalekha	K. S. Chithra	5:07
6.	"Ajantha Ellora"	Hamsalekha	Vijay Yesudas	4:59
7.	"Hey Beladingale"	Hamsalekha	Hemanth Kumar, Divya Raghavan, Chetan Sosca, Ravishankar, Butto, Anoop Seelin	4:40
8.	"Draupadi Theme"			2:18
Total length:				41:04

== Critical reception ==
Upon theatrical release, the film was reviewed positively by critics. B. S. Srivani of Deccan Herald said the film ".. is a classic example of how the crucial components of a film can bring out a clean, almost irreproachable product. Taut direction, crisp dialogues that do not pontificate, slick editing and the sheer poetic spell cast by the camera and music come together to make a delectable concoction." She gave special praise to the cinematographer H. M. Ramachandra for having captured "locales of Mysore, Mangalore and Bangalore ... beautifully." R. G. Vijayasarathy of Rediff reviewed the film and called it "a cut above the rest in terms of quality and presentation." He praised the roles of the technical departments of the film and concluded writing, "Nenapirali has class. It is a worthy addition to the list of good films from the Kannada film industry. A must for all industry enthusiasts." Viggy.com writes in praise of the director Rathnaja straightaway for having "displayed technical competency in his very first attempt." The role technical and acting departments were praised.

== Awards ==
Award	Category	Recipient	Result	Ref.
2005–06 Karnataka State Film Awards	Second Best Film	Ajay Gowda	Won	
2005–06 Karnataka State Film Awards	Best Cinematographer	H. M. Ramachandra	Won	
2005–06 Karnataka State Film Awards	Music Director	Hamsalekha	Won	
2005–06 Karnataka State Film Awards	Best Female Dubbing Artist	Amrutha Singh	Won	
53rd Filmfare Awards South	Best Film	Ajay Gowda	Won	
53rd Filmfare Awards South	Best Director	Rathnaja	Won	
53rd Filmfare Awards South	Best Actor	Prem Kumar	Won	
53rd Filmfare Awards South	Best Actress	Vidhya Venkatesh	Won	
53rd Filmfare Awards South	Best Music Director	Hamsalekha	Won	
