= Chowka =

2017 Indian Kannada-language action drama film

- Theatrical Poster
- Directed by: Tharun Kishore Sudhir
- Written by: A. P. Arjun, Simple Suni, A. V. Chinthan, Anil Kumar, Yoganand Muddan
- Screenplay by: Tharun Kishore Sudhir
- Produced by: Dwarakish; Yogish Dwarakish Bungale
- Starring: Vijay Raghavendra; Prem; Diganth; Prajwal Devaraj; Aindrita Ray; Priyamani; Bhavana; Deepa Sannidhi; Kashinath; Chikkanna
- Narrated by: Chikkanna
- Cinematography: Satya Hegde; S. Krishna; Santhosh Rai Pathaje; Shekar Chandru; Sudhakar S. Raj
- Edited by: K. M. Prakash
- Music by: Gurukiran; Arjun Janya; V. Harikrishna; Anoop Seelin; Sridhar V. Sambhram
- Production companies: Dwarakish Chitra; Co-produced by: United Spirits
- Distributed by: Mysore Talkies
- Release date: 3 February 2017
- Running time: 178 minutes
- Country: India
- Language: Kannada

Chowka is a 2017 Indian Kannada-language action drama film directed by Tharun Sudhir, in his directional debut, and produced by Dwarakish, marking his 50th production film. The film features an ensemble cast of Vijay Raghavendra, Prem, Diganth, Prajwal Devaraj, Chikkanna, Aindrita Ray, Priyamani, Bhavana and Deepa Sannidhi.

In the first of its kind, the film boasts of employing five music directors, five lyricists, cinematographers, five art directors and five dialogue writers. The film was nominated for the Filmfare Award for Best Film – Kannada and Best Director at the 65th Filmfare Awards South and won Best director (Tharun Kishore Sudhir).

== Plot ==
1986 (Bangalore): Hakki Gopala is accused of murdering his gangster mentor Jayaraj's rival Sathyaraj and an SI, who were actually murdered by Jayaraj.

1995 (Mysore): Krishna Rao, who is blamed for the murder of his pregnant friend Maria, who was actually murdered by his insane neighbour.

2000 (Mangalore): Surya Shetty, who is dragged into a false murder case, which arises political tension.

2007 (Bijapur): Mohammed Anwar, who is blamed for a bomb blast which was actually committed by Anwar's brother-in-law, who is actually a terrorist.

The friends are all linked with their only friend, Manjunatha aka Manja.

2017: They all meet each other in Central Jail of Bellary. They meet a school teacher, Vishwanath, who not only shows them hope but also stirs up a passion towards reform in them. They learn that Vishwanath was actually framed for the murder of his daughter, Ramya. When they enquire, Vishwanath reveals that Ramya loved Anand, who is the son of MLA Krishnamurthy. This had enraged Krishnamurthy and led to Ramya's death, the blame falling on Vishwanath for the murder. The four decide to help Vishwanath in his objective.

After various twists and turns, they manage to escape from the jail by fooling the Jailor Indira Sharma. When they reach a dense jungle at night, the police arrive and a shootout ensues, in which Vishwanath is shot and taken to the hospital. The four reluctantly escape with the help of Manja and attack Suvarna Vidhana Soudha premises in Belagavi, but with no harm is caused.

When Krishnamurthy protests, Anwar shoots his arm, where Krishnamurthy divulges everything, and Vishwanath is proven innocent. After proving Vishwanath's innocence, the four are shot by commandos (due to a toy bomb dropped accidentally by Krishna, causing the commandos to think that they are suicide bombers). Pushpa (Gopala's girlfriend), Bhoomika (Surya's girlfriend), Gowri (Anwar's girlfriend), and Vishwanath watch it with utter disbelief and tear-jerking.

== Cast ==
- Vijay Raghavendra as Surya Shetty
- Prem as Hakki Gopala
- Diganth as Krishna Rao
- Prajwal Devaraj as Mohammed Anwar
- Priyamani as Maria D'Souza
- Aindrita Ray as Pushpa, Gopal's girlfriend
- Bhavana as Bhoomika, Surya's girlfriend
- Deepa Sannidhi as Gowri, Anwar's girlfriend
- Avinash as MLA Krishnamurthy
- Kashinath as Vishwanath
- Sharath Lohitashwa as Jayraj
- Abhirami as Jailer Indira Sharma
- Giri Dwarakish as Seena
- Chikkanna as Manjunath (Manju)
- Tabla Nani as Inspector
- Ravi Chetan as Inspector
- Umesh Punga as Police Jeep Driver
- Mohan Kumar
- Mahesh Raj
- Prashanth Seshadri as a film director
- Rajesh Rao as Bijapur Police Commissioner
- Mallesh Gowda as Mysore Police officer
- Venkata Ram as Bangalore Police Inspector
- Sudheer Sudhi
- Mico Nagaraj as Sathyaraj
- Balaji Manohar
- Dingri Nagaraj
- Bus Kumar as Lawyer
- Vanishree as Anwar's mother
- Prakash Shenoy
- Jyothi Muroor
- Nihal Gowda
- Yashwanth Shetty
- Raghu Pandeshwar as a waiter
- Kari Subbu

=== Cameos ===
- Darshan as Robert
- Manvitha Harish as Ramya, Vishwanath's daughter
- Dwarakish in song "Alladsu Alladsu"
- Tharun Sudhir in song "Alladsu Alladsu"
- Prabhakar as Jungli
- Scarlett Wilson in a song "Adoo Aata Adoo"

== Production ==
Since it was Dwarakish's 50th film as a producer, several actors agreed to costar in the film. Sudeepa and Chiranjeevi Sarja were initially set to star in the film.

== Soundtrack ==
Chowka

Soundtrack album by V. Harikrishna, V. Sridhar, Arjun Janya, Gurukiran, Anoop Seelin
- Released: 25 January 2017
- Genre: Feature film soundtrack
- Length: 24:56
- Label: Anand Audio

V. Harikrishna chronology
Santhu Straight Forward (2016)	Chowka (2017)	Raajakumara (2017)

V. Sridhar chronology
Krishna-Rukku (2015)	Chowka (2017)	Sarvasva (2017)

Arjun Janya chronology
Chakravarthy (2017)	Chowka (2017)	Raaga (2017)

Anoop Seelin chronology
Smile Please (2017)	Chowka (2017)	Bangalore Underworld (2017)

Gurukiran chronology
Nagarahavu (2016)	Chowka (2017)	Aake (2017)

V. Harikrishna, V. Sridhar, Arjun Janya, Gurukiran, and Anoop Seelin have composed the film's background and scored its soundtrack. Lyrics for the soundtrack were penned by Jayant Kaikini, Yograj Bhat Siddayaiah Puranic, Santhosh Naik, and Chethan Kumar. The soundtrack album consists of six tracks. It was released on 25 January 2017.

Track listing
No.	Title	Lyrics	Music	Singer(s)	Length
1.	"Turthinalli Geechida"	Jayanth Kaikini	Sridhar V. Sambhram	Sonu Nigam, Antara Mitra	4:08
2.	"Alladsu Alladsu"	Yogaraj Bhat	V. Harikrishna	Vijay Prakash	4:13
3.	"Appa I Love You"	V. Nagendra Prasad	Arjun Janya	Anuradha Bhat	4:53
4.	"Aadoo Aata Aadoo"	Santhosh Naik	Gurukiran	Chaitra H. G.	4:03
5.	"Vande Mataram"	Siddaiah Puranik	Arjun Janya	Ranjith	4:23
6.	"Party Party Nightu"	Chetan Kumar	Anoop Seelin	Puneeth Rajkumar	4:21

== Reception ==
S Viswanath of Deccan Herald wrote "Each technical team leaves its indelible imprint. The film climaxes in Ballari jail where the four protagonists are interned following their arrests, and thereafter at Suvarna Vidhana Soudha, Belagavi. Veteran actor-director Kashinath, as the maligned father, does a commendable job as the pivot for the foursome’s escape from jail and bringing to book the corrupt Finance Minister played by Avinash. A worthy weekend watch for family". A Sharadhaa of The New Indian Express wrote "Even Challenging star Darshan’s cameo is justified as he faces off with Baahubali Kalakeya. Senior actor Kashinath and Manvitha’s roles are a surprise. The heroines - Aindrita Ray, Priyamani, Bhavana and Deepa Sanidhi - share less screen space, but add to the charm of the film. Technically all of them have contributed to the film. Credit should go to the music directors for the beautiful songs. Especially the track, Appa I love You, which certainly makes tears rolling down. Watch Chowka for its pragmatic message to all of us"

Sunayana Suresh of The Times of India wrote that "For a film that is three hours long, one does not get tired with narrative's pace and stays with the story till the end. Watch this film if you like multi-starrers that provide commercial entertainment, while not bowing down to being just mindless fun". Shashiprasad SM of Deccan Chronicle wrote "Chowka’ (means four) characters have accepted to live with it. In between, the repetition of a dialogue which is an advertisement for a consumer brand is another low point. Then, a great escape from jail hogs the rest of the journey. An innocent school master serving jail, a sole friend linked to all the four is ‘unbelievable’. An average in the end, ‘Chowka’ is a highly diluted spirit with hardly any kick in it. May be a paisa vasool for the brand associated with it".
