= Vishnuvardhana (film) =

2011 Indian Kannada-language action comedy thriller film

- Vishnuvardhana Poster
- Directed by: Pon Kumaran
- Screenplay by: Pon Kumaran; Kalidas; Shrikanth
- Story by: Pon Kumaran
- Produced by: Dwarakish
- Starring: Sudeepa; Bhavana; Priyamani; Sonu Sood
- Cinematography: Raja Rathinam
- Edited by: Gautham Raju
- Music by: V. Harikrishna
- Production company: Dwarkish Studios
- Distributed by: Jayanna Films
- Release date: 8 December 2011 (India)
- Running time: 169 minutes
- Country: India
- Language: Kannada
- Box office: ₹ 7 crore

Vishnuvardhana is a 2011 Indian Kannada language action comedy thriller film directed by Pon Kumaran in his directorial debut and produced by Dwarakish. It stars Sudeepa, Bhavana, Priyamani and Sonu Sood. The music was composed by V. Harikrishna.

Vishnuvardhana was released on 8 December 2011 to positive reviews from critics.The movie was remade in Bengali as Bachchan (2014). The film was reported to have been inspired by the 2009 Korean movie Handphone.

== Plot ==
Vishnuvardhana, the son of laundry owner Puttayya, is a big fan of Dr. Vishnuvardhan and spends time with his astrologer friend Nimbehannu aka Shastri. He dreams of earning money and becoming rich, but not through hard work. One day, while delivering clothes to the colonel's house, he meets the colonel's daughter Bharathi and falls in love with her. He learns that Bharathi wants to marry a doctor and sets out to meet Dr. Suryaprakash. Vishnu and Shastri arrive at Mallige Hospital where the meeting is to be held. He makes Bharathi fall for him by pretending to be a doctor.

Meanwhile, Vishnu gets into a tussle with a local goon, but the tussle is interrupted by Vishnu's constable uncle, who takes them to the police station where Vishnu learns that they work for a dreaded crime boss named Adishesha. Adishesha intervenes, allowing the henchmen to leave and demanding the identity of the person, but he lies to him that he left and withdrew the complaint. When Adishesha leaves, his Blackberry phone accidentally drops from his pocket and Vishnu retrieves it. After taking the phone, Adishesha's colleague Wahab calls the phone and tells Vishnu (assuming that Adishesha is talking) that the contract of killing a man named Gulchand at Mallige Hospital is done. Wahab asks about the location where he has to hand over a sum of ₹ 5 crores. Seizing the opportunity, Vishnu calls them to a nightclub where he gets the money and safely puts it in a bike locker.

A cat-mouse game between Adishesha (who finds that his phone is stolen by someone) and Vishnu in which Vishnu manages to hide his identity. Adishesha takes the help of an ACP to find the phone and the culprit who is reluctant but agrees when Adishesha reveals the secret video of the ACP which he recorded on the phone. The ACP tries to catch Vishnu but to no avail. Later, Vishnu and Shastri meet a girl named Meera, who knows about Vishnu and his game with Adishesha. Meera tells Vishnu that he should kill Adishesha within 24 hours or she will reveal his identity to Adishesha, to which he obliges. Meanwhile, Dr. Suryaprakash gives a contract to kill Vishnu as he ruined his meeting with Bharathi by pretending to be a doctor, to which he agrees. Later, Vishnu and Shastri decide to keep the phone secret as the henchmen tried to attack his father and Vishnu learns about the contract given by Suryaprakash to kill him. Vishnu meets Meera again in Adishesha's house, who is actually Adishesha's wife and gives him another 24 hours to finish him.

Vishnu reveals his real identity to Bharathi and Colonel, who forgives him when he saved Bharathi's sister from a miscarriage. Vishnu pretends to know the culprit's face and stays in Adishesha's house. Vishnu confronts Meera to reveal the truth. Meera reveals that she loved Adishesha and left her family to be with him, but he cheated and drugged her with soporific as the ACP made a deal with Adishesha about his exoneration from the cases, in exchange for having sex with Meera. The ACP has sex with Meera, which is secretly recorded by Adishesha (as shown after the beginning of the film). When Meera witnessed Vishnu stealing Adishesha's phone, she decided to use Vishnu as a weapon to avenge her injustice. After learning her past, Vishnu obliges and decides to help her. He blackmails the ACP to kill Adishesha or the video will be telecasted in the news channels, The ACP tries to kill Adhishesha, but is thrashed by the former, who learnt his plan from the culprit (Vishnu himself) and tries to kill him, but gets a call from the phone booth's owner, revealing that the culprit was caught on the security camera's footage.

Adishesha, along with Vishnu and ACP finds Meera's face is caught in the footage and Adishesha leaves to confront Meera. After Adishesha and the ACP leave, Vishnu calls Meera and tells her to escape from the house. Meera escapes, but is caught by Adishesha and asked about the culprit, to which she denies telling him. Meera sees Vishnu amidst the crowd and screams not to arrive. While searching for the culprit (Vishnu). Vishnu reveals his identity to Adishesha and the two engage in hand-to-hand combat where Vishnu defeats and is about to kill him. The ACP having deduced Vishnu's identity forces him to hand over the phone, but Vishnu makes a deal with the ACP to shoot Adishesha in exchange for the phone and a Mexican standoff ensues where Vishnu escapes from the standoff, whereas Adishesha and the ACP get killed. Thus, Vishnu reconciles with Shastri, thus ending all the troubles.

== Cast ==
- Sudeepa as Vishnuvardhana
- Bhavana as Bharathi
- Priyamani as Meera
- Sonu Sood as Adhishesha
- Dwarakish as Colonel
- Arun Sagar as Nimbehannu aka Shastri
- J. Karthik as Dr. Surya Prakash
- Neenasam Ashwath as Adhishesha's brother
- Karisubbu as Puttayya, Laundry Owner & Vishnuvardhana's father
- Ravi Chethan as Police Inspector
- Muni as District Commissioner of Police
- Taranga Vishwa
- Ravi Varma
- Pon Kumaran as Vahaab in Special Appearance
- M. N. Suresh
- Mandeep Rai as Blind Person & Telephone Booth Owner
- Mysore Ramanand as Marriage Broker
- Aarthi as Valli
- Sangeeta as Bharathi's sister

== Production ==
=== Title controversy ===
Since the movie went into production with the title Vishnuvardhana, there was a strong opposition against the usage of the title by some groups. This opposition was led by Dr. Vishnuvardhan's wife, actress Dr. Bharathi Vishnuvardhan. Dwarakish, along with his associate producer Yogish, struggled hard to fight the accusations. Finally, the title was changed to Veera Vishnuvardhana and Only Vishnuvardhana and was later changed again to Vishnuvardhana.

== Soundtrack ==
Vishnuvardhana

Soundtrack album by V. Harikrishna
- Released: 1 December 2011
- Genre: Film soundtrack
- Length: 22:42
- Label: A2 Music
- Producer: V. Harikrishna

V. Harikrishna chronology
Saarathi (2011)	Vishnuvardhana (2011)	Chingari (2012)

V. Harikrishna composed five songs along with the background score for this film. The audio was formally released on 1 December 2011 and on a private radio station, the songs were released on the same day. The lyrics are penned by lyricists such as V. Nagendra Prasad, Kaviraj and Yogaraj Bhat. Ashwini Media works took up the audio distribution rights for 3.6 million rupees.

No.	Title	Lyrics	Singer(s)	Length
1.	"One Two Three Vishnuvardhana"	V. Nagendra Prasad	Naveen Madhav	4:39
2.	"Maaya Maaya"	Kaviraj	V. Harikrishna	4:07
3.	"Nam Routealli"	Yogaraj Bhat	Vijay Prakash, Shankar Mahadevan, Anuradha Bhat	5:30
4.	"Yedeyolage"	V. Nagendra Prasad	Tippu, Sowmya Raoh	4:29
5.	"Yarappana Gantu"	Yogaraj Bhat	Lakshmi Vijay	4:29
Total length:				22:42

== Release and box office ==
The movie was released in around 140 theatres all over Karnataka. The satellite rights of the film were sold for ₹1.6 crore (US$170,000) to Udaya TV. The distributor, Kumar MN, said that the collection was ₹6 crore (US$640,000) in one week. It was mostly the huge fan following of Vishnuvardhan who had watched the film initially, but was later followed by the Sudeepa fans and Vishnuvardhan fans together, pouring in to watch the film repeatedly. The film was later dubbed into Hindi as Mr. Mobile 2 by Goldmines Telefilms in 2016 with Sudeepa's voice dubbed by Amar Babaria.

== Reception ==
=== Critical response ===
Shruti Indira Lakshminarayana from Rediff.com scored the film at 3.5 out of 5 stars and says "If you're looking for actor Vishnuvardhan's real-life story, you are not going to find much of it in this film. But if it's just some entertainment you have in mind, this will certainly do. Vishnuvardhana deserves a place on your weekend to-do list. Go for it". A critic from The New Indian Express wrote "And, he also deserves a lot of appreciation for his dancing skills. However, his performance in comedy sequences requires improvement. Arun Sagar, as an astrologer, complements Sudeep. ‘Jackie’-fame Bhavana puts in a lot of effort. To retain her glory but disappoints the audience. Her height is unsuitable for her to be cast opposite Sudeep". B S Srivani from Deccan Herald wrote "Sudeep though enjoys his role without any hang-ups - perhaps after S Narayan’s ‘Veera Parampare’. Sonu Sood is a treat to watch but for the wrong choice in dubbing. This Vishnuvardhana is a mood-lifter for sure". A critic from Bangalore Mirror wrote "The title song may qualify with repeated hearings. Sudeep comes up with a sound performance and proves again that he is one of the best in the business. Bhavana and Priyamani fit the bill and the latter as the villain’s wife has a surprisingly different role. An enjoyable film that should mark the year-end with fireworks in Sandalwood". A critic from The Times of India wrote that "It's Sudeep all the way. With excellent dialogue delivery and expressive body language, Kitcha walks away with full honours by bringing alive his character. Not far behind in is director P Kumar who has done an excellent job with lively narration and screenplay that keeps you entertained from beginning to end".

== Remake ==
The movie was remade in Bengali as Bachchan starring Jeet, Aindrita Ray, Payel Sarkar, and Mukul Dev in lead roles.

== Awards and nominations ==
59th Filmfare Awards South :-

- Best Director – Kannada – Nominated – P. Kumar

1st South Indian International Movie Awards :-

- Best Debut Director – Kannada – Winner – P. Kumar
- Best Film – Kannada – Nominated – B.S. Dwarakish
- Best Actor (Female) – Kannada – Nominated – Bhavana
- Best Actor in a Supporting Role – Kannada – Nominated – Arun Sagar
- Best Actor in a Negative Role – Kannada – Nominated – Sonu Sood
- Best Cinematographer – Kannada – Nominated – Rajarathnam
- Best Playback Singer (Female) – Kannada – Nominated – Sowmya Raoh for the song "Yedeyolage Guitaru"

4th Suvarna Film Awards :-

- Best Actor – Winner – Sudeepa
- Best Choreographer – Winner – Harsha

Sandalwood Star Awards :-

- Best Film – Nominated
- Best Actor – Nominated – Sudeepa
- Best Director – Nominated – P. Kumar
- Best Debut Director – Winner – P. Kumar
- Best Comedian – Nominated – Arun Sagar
- Best Actor in a Negative Role – Nominated – Sonu Sood
- Best Screenplay – Nominated – P. Kumar
- Best Supporting Actress – Winner – Priyamani
- Best Dialogue – Nominated – Kalidasa, Srikanth, Ramesh Kamal
- Best Stunt Director – Nominated – Ravi Varma, Ganesh
- Best Choreographer – Winner – Harsha
- Best Art Director – Nominated – Mohan Pandit, Mohan Kere, Anand

Bangalore Times Film Awards :-

- Best Actor – Winner – Sudeepa
- Best Film – Nominated
- Best Actor in a Negative Role Male – Nominated – Sonu Sood
- Best Actor in a Negative Role Female – Nominated – Priyamani

1st Kannada International Music Awards (KiMA) :-

- Best Playback Singer (Female) – Nominated – Lakshmi Vijay for the song "Yaarappana Gante Aagli"
