= Vidhya Venkatesh =

Indian actress

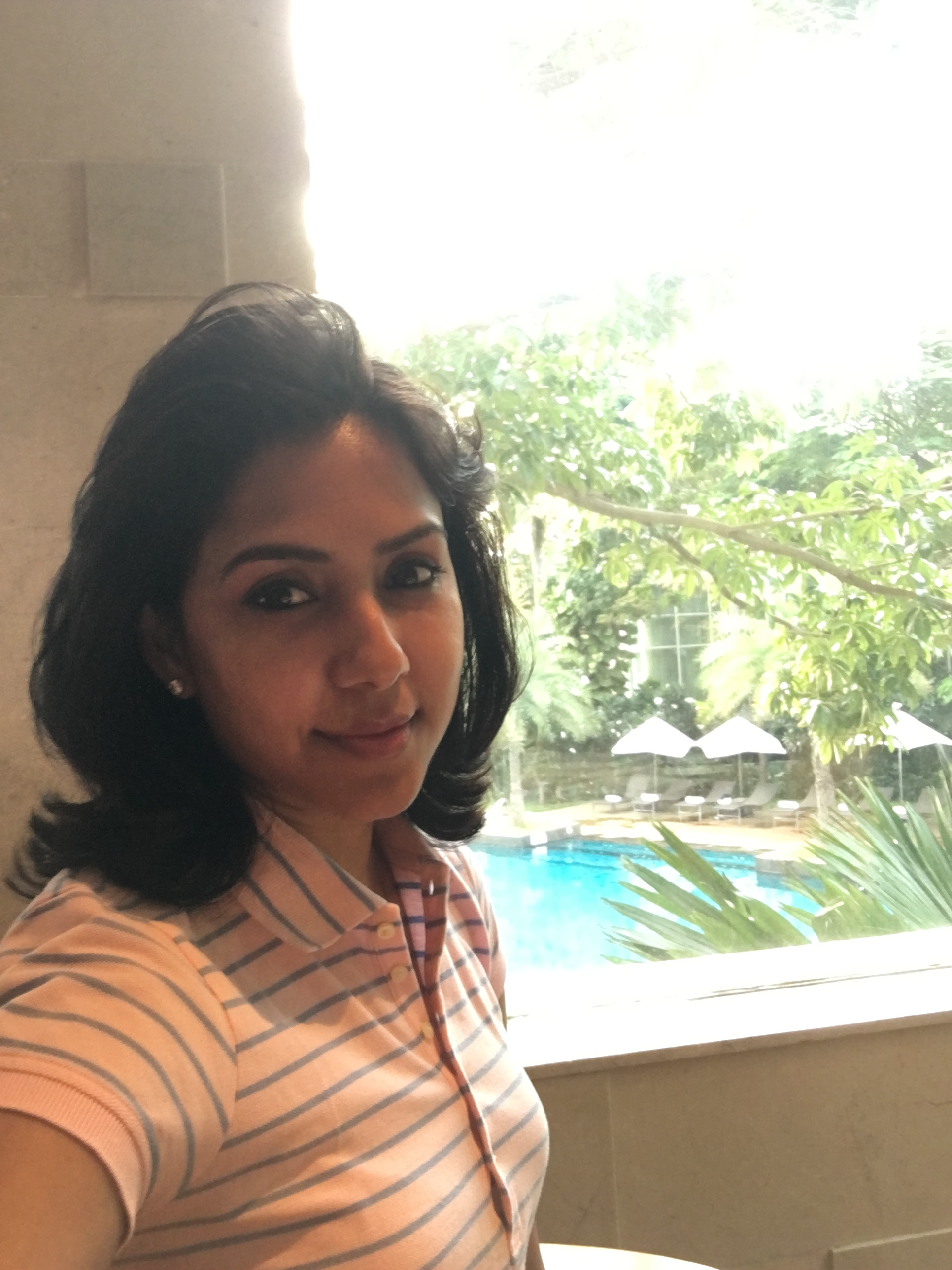
- Born: Salem, Tamil Nadu, India
- Other name: Vidya Venkatesh
- Occupation: Actor
- Years active: 2002–2005

Vidhya Venkatesh is an Indian former actress who has appeared in Tamil and Kannada-language films. After making her debut with Kamal Haasan in the Tamil film Panchatanthiram (2002), she won critical acclaim for her performances in Kannada films Chigurida Kanasu (2003) and Nenapirali (2005). Her performance in Nenapirali won her Best Actress Award at 53rd Filmfare Awards South.

== Career ==
Vidhya Venkatesh did a degree a BA Literature at Ethiraj College, Chennai before beginning work as a part of the Sheraton Hotels and Resorts franchise. She then spent two and a half years working as an air hostess for Singapore Airlines, flying predominantly between Singapore and Russia. Vidhya was interested in acting in films and approached K. S. Ravikumar for a role in the Kamal Haasan-starrer Panchathanthiram (2002), and was able to successfully audition for the role of Sriman's Telugu wife in the film. She then appeared in the low-budget film Kalatpadai (2003) alongside several newcomers and won positive reviews for her portrayal, with a reviewer noting that she is "excellent in her role" and that "she comes into her own as the movie proceeds". Her modelling co-ordinator subsequently put her pictures through to Kannada director Nagabharana and she next appeared in Chigurida Kanasu (2003). She followed it up with a critically acclaimed performance in Nenapirali (2005), for which she won the Filmfare Award for Best Kannada Actress.

== Filmography ==
Year	Film	Role	Language	Notes
2002	Panchatanthiram	Reddy's wife	Tamil	
2003	Kalatpadai	Priya	Tamil	
2003	Chigurida Kanasu	Varalakshmi	Kannada	
2005	Nenapirali	Bindushree	Kannada	Filmfare Award for Best Actress – Kannada
