= Saurav Lokesh =

Indian film Actor

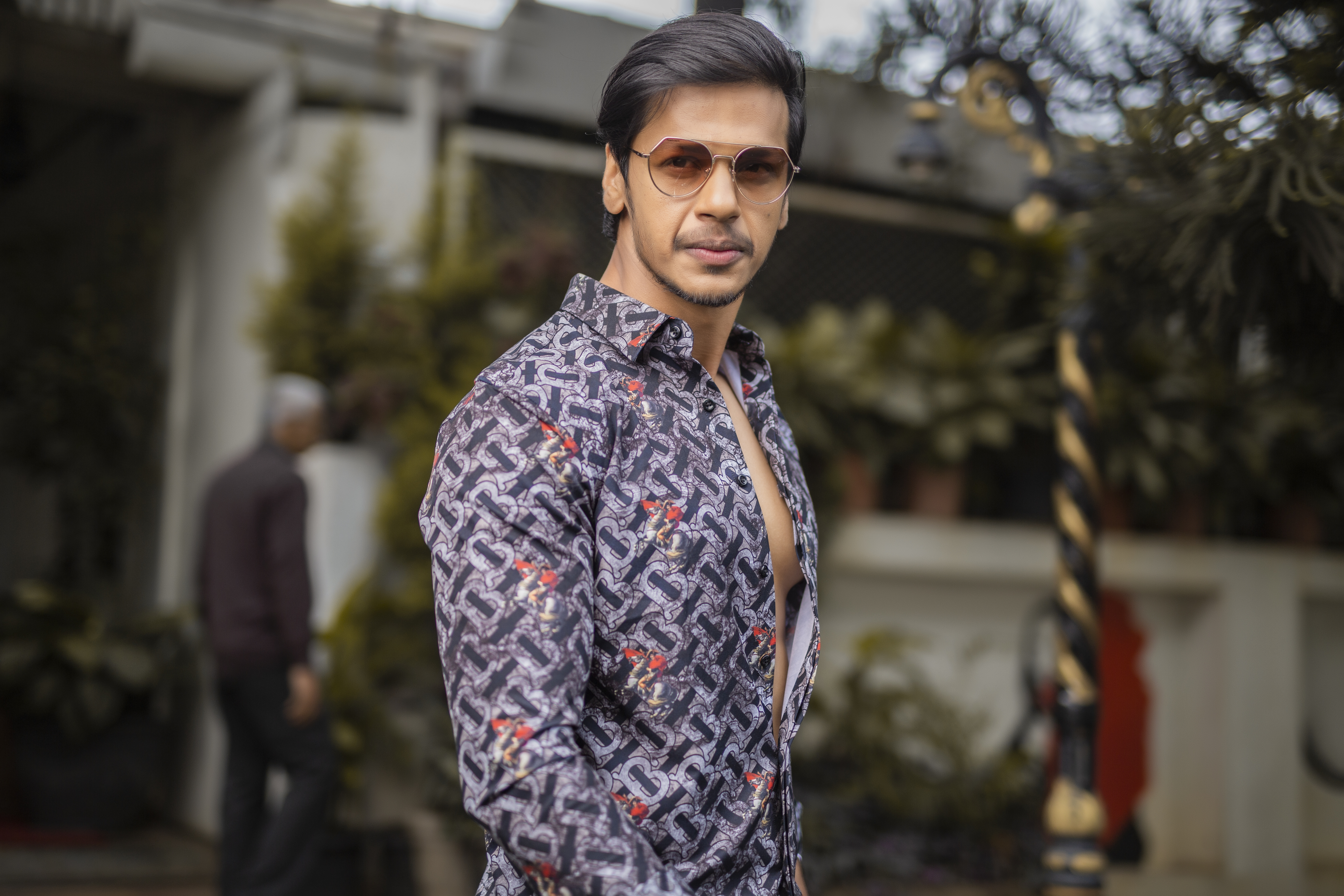
- Saurav Lokesh
- Born: 28 May 1984 (age 42); Bangalore, Karnataka, India
- Education: National College Jayanagar, Bangalore.
- Occupation: Actor
- Years active: 2009–present

Saurav Lokesh (born 28 May 1984), also known as Bhajarangi Loki, is an Indian actor who predominantly works in Kannada cinema. He rose to the fame with the 2013 blockbuster Bhajarangi.

== Early life ==
Saurav was born as youngest son to V. Ramakrishna & L. Rajalakshmi in Srinagar Bangalore district, Karnataka. He graduated with a Bachelor of Science degree in Chemistry, from National College, Jayanagar. He was employed at HSBC before he resigned and followed his passion for acting and started doing theatre.

== Career ==
Lokesh started his acting journey from theatre in the year 2006. He has worked with most of the amateur & professional theatre groups from 2006 to 2014, which includes more than 30 plays which has been performed over 100+ shows. While he was doing theatre he managed to get into television serials and started doing supporting roles but did not achieve much success.

Saurav Lokesh made his sandalwood debut in the year 2009 with a small role in the movie Savaari directed by Jacob Verghese. He then appeared in small supporting roles in Huli, AK 56, and Shiva, all directed by Om Prakash Rao, between 2010 and 2012. He appeared as minor antagonists in Googly and Mr. and Mrs. Ramachari.

He has appeared in more than 12 movies in small supporting roles before getting his breakthrough performance in Bhajarangi, directed by A. Harsha, which won him many applause and was praised for his role as Rana. The movie was a commercial hit and got him wide recognition as an actor and he became popular as Bhajarangi Loki. In the year 2015 he appeared Rathaavara as a transgender, which furthered his fame. He also played a role of a lawyer in Mahakaali. He also appeared as an antagonist in Sharp Shooter. In 2016, he appeared in the movie Jaguar; a bilingual film in both Kannada and Telugu, this was Lokesh's Telugu debut. In the same year, he also appeared as one of the lead antagonists in Jai Maruthi 800. Saurav appeared in the role of Bhujanga in Raj Vishnu. In Thayige Thakka Maga, Lokesh played an antagonist in the role of Sharath Kale. Later, in 2019, Lokesh played a police officer in the suspense-thriller Striker. In the same year he appeared as Bairaa, an antagonist, in Radhika Kumaraswamy's comeback film Damayanthi, directed by Navarasan. In 2020, he appeared as an antagonist in rom-com fantasy movie Kaanadante Maayavadanu.

== Filmography ==
=== Films ===
Year	Film	Role	Language	Notes	Ref.
2009	Savaari	Salman	Kannada		
2010	Mathe Mungaru	Fisherman	Kannada		
2010	Huli	College Student	Kannada		
2012	AK 56	Local Goon	Kannada		
2012	Narasimha	Local Goon	Kannada		
2012	Shiva	Police Trainee	Kannada		
2013	Googly	Local Goon	Kannada		
2013	Mangana Kaiyalli Manikya		Kannada		
2013	Sweety Nanna Jodi		Kannada		
2013	Bhajarangi	Rana	Kannada	Nominated for SIIMA in Best Actor in a Negative Role (2014)	
2014	Sadagara		Kannada		
2014	Belli		Kannada		
2014	Ambareesha		Kannada		
2014	Mr. and Mrs. Ramachari	Ramachari's collegemate	Kannada		
2015	Mahakali	Lawyer	Kannada		
2015	Just Maduveli		Kannada		
2015	Sharp Shooter		Kannada		
2015	Rathaavara	Maadevi	Kannada		
2016	Jai Maruthi 800	Narasimha	Kannada		
2016	Jaguar	Ajay	Kannada	Bilingual	
2016	Jaguar	Ajay	Telugu	Bilingual	
2017	Veera Ranachandi	Lucky	Kannada		
2017	Raj Vishnu	Rupai Bhujanga	Kannada		
2018	Gaanchali	Johnny	Kannada		
2018	Thayige Thakka Maga	SharathKaale	Kannada	Nominated for Filmibeat in Best Actor in a Negative Role (2018)	
2019	Striker	Purushotham	Kannada		
2019	Ranabhoomi	Cop	Kannada		
2019	Damayanthi	Bhaira	Kannada		
2019	Margaret	Ramachari	Kannada		
2020	Kaanadante Maayavadanu	Jayanna	Kannada		
2021	Bhajarangi 2	Sudheendra	Kannada		
2022	Local Train		Kannada		
2022	Acharya	Rathod's Brother	Telugu		
2022	Nachindi Girl Friendu	Vikram Roy	Telugu		
2022	Takkar		Kannada		
2023	Raja Marthanda	Jayanna	Kannada		
2023	Salaar: Part 1 – Ceasefire	Cheeka	Telugu		
2024	Matsyagandha	Joint Ravi	Kannada		
2025	Edagaiye Apaghatakke Karana	Praneeth	Kannada		
2025	They Call Him OG	Shabra	Telugu		
TBA	Dildaar	Soorya	Kannada	Post production	
TBA	Ghoda	Sambashivudu	Telugu	Post production	
TBA	Vishwambhara	TBA	Telugu	Post production	
TBA	Marika	TBA	Kannada	Shooting	

=== Television ===
Year	Title	Role	Network	Notes	Ref.
2008	Nakutanti	Office Boy	Udaya TV	Directed by Giri Raj	
2011	Mahabharata (Kannada)	Younger Bheeshma	Udaya TV	Produced by Cinevistaas Limited	
2012	Cheluvi	Army Officer	Suvarna TV		
2014	CID Karnataka	CID	Zee Kannada		
2019	Raktha Chandana	Psycho Killer	Watchoo Channel	Directed by Giri Raj	

== Awards and nominations ==
Year (Note: Refers to the year in which the award ceremony was held.)	Film	Award	Category	Result	Ref
2014	Bhajarangi	SIIMA – 2014	Best Actor in a Negative role	Nominated	
2018	Thayige Thakka Maga	'Filmibeat' Best of 2018	Best Kannada Negative Role 2018	Nominated	
