= Jai Maruthi 800 =

2015 film directed by Harsha

- Directed by: A. Harsha
- Screenplay by: A. Harsha
- Story by: Swamy
- Produced by: Manjula Ramesh
- Starring: Sharan; Shruthi Hariharan; Shubha Poonja; Madhu Guruswamy
- Narrated by: Kichcha Sudeep
- Cinematography: Swamy J. Gowda
- Edited by: Deepu S. Kumar
- Music by: Arjun Janya
- Production company: Jayanna Combines
- Distributed by: Jayanna and Bhogendra
- Release date: 8 April 2016
- Country: India
- Language: Kannada

Jai Maruthi 800 is a 2016 Indian Kannada action comedy film written and directed by A. Harsha and produced by Jayanna. It stars Sharan, Shruthi Hariharan and Shubha Poonja in the lead roles. The music is composed by Arjun Janya and cinematography by Swamy J. Gowda.

== Plot ==
Jeeva (Sharan) must correct the mistakes understood about his best friend Raghu by his villagers in childhood after his death.

Then he goes to his friend's village where two village heads are enemies. When he enters he sees Raghu's sister and her boyfriend are just to be killed by the head because he is from another village. He manages to save them by marrying them and separating them in the eyes of the head. He says that he is Jeeva and a fan of the head. He lies to Raghu's mother and two sisters that he is Raghu.

He then goes to another village in the form of a director. There he falls in love with the head's daughter Geeta (Shruti Hariharan), who later reciprocates it after knowing his good character. But the twist in the tale comes when his village's head's sister Smita (Shuba Punja) tells that she loves him. Later Geeta's father learns his mistake. Jeeva violently beats up Smita's brother and gives him a chance to change which he does. The film ends with Raghu's sister's marriage. The pandit asks about Jeeva's marriage which again creates a rift which Jeeva resolves. Jeeva asks the god Maruti which he advices to choose himself.

== Cast ==
- Sharan as Jeeva
- Shruthi Hariharan as Geetha
- Shubha Poonja as Smitha
- Vijayanand as Raghu
- Sadhu Kokila
- Arun Sagar
- Kuri Prathap
- Jehangir M.S.
- Mico Nagaraj
- Saurav Lokesh as Narasimha
- Madhu Guruswamy as Veerappa
- Pavan Kumar
- Mohan Juneja
- Apoorva
- Vidya Rao
- Tanuja
- Padmaja Rao
- Harini Shrikanth
- Girija Lokesh
- Ravindranath
- Bhajarangi Mohan
- Vijay Koundinya
- Kaavya Sha (special appearance in the song "Jai Maruthi")
- Shille Manjunath

== Production ==
Director Harsha, known for his action films like Bhajarangi and Vajrakaya came up with a light hearted comedy script in order to break the stereotype. Actor Sharan was roped in to play the main role while Shruthi Hariharan was selected to play the opposite lead role. Shubha Poonja was cast in the second lead role. The principal photography started in August 2015. The first schedule of the shooting was held at Belgaum. For some of the action scenes, Sharan underwent rigorous workouts and developed six packs. The director revealed that the story starts as a period drama and drifts towards the present time.

== Soundtrack ==
Jai Maruthi 800

Soundtrack album by Arjun Janya
- Genre: Feature film soundtrack

Arjun Janya has composed the film's background score and the soundtrack.

=== Track listing ===
No.	Title	Singer(s)	Length
1.	"Mandhara"	Santhosh Venky
2.	"Jai Maruthi (Rama Banta Hanumanu)"	Puneeth Rajkumar, Indu Nagaraj (arjun janya)
3.	"Ding Ding Dong"	Vijay Prakash
4.	"Rajastani Pungi"	Arjun Janya, Indu Nagaraj
5.	"Ding Ding Dong (Chimp voice)"	Vijay Prakash
6.	"Theme of Lord Hanuman"	Instrumental
