= Deepika Kamaiah =

Indian model turned film actress

- Born: Nandineravanda Deepika Kamaiah; Bangalore, India
- Occupations: Model; actress
- Years active: 2011–2016
- Spouse: Sumanth Gopi (m. 2016)

Deepika Kamaiah is an Indian former model and actress. She mainly worked in Kannada films in addition to Bollywood films. Kamaiah has been a finalist of the Femina Miss India. In 2014, she participated in the reality television show Bigg Boss Kannada and finished as second runner-up.

== Personal life ==
Nandineravanda Deepika Kamaiah, a Kodavathi, was born in Bangalore. Her mother is a school teacher and teaches Kannada. Deepika Kamaiah is an alumnus of Kendriya Vidyalaya Hebbal, Bangalore, and obtained a bachelor of commerce degree from Bishop Cotton Women's Christian College in 2009. She married Sumanth Gopi, a banker, in 2016.

== Career ==
=== Modelling and film ===
She began her modelling career while she was studying her class 11. She went on to become one of the finalists in the Femina Miss India South beauty pageant in 2009. She also won the Lycra MTV Style Awards in 2010. While she was juggling between her modeling assignments and studies, a film offer came through from a Tamil director, Kulaindai Veerappan for his directorial, Aanmai Thavarael. Her role, however, went unnoticed without any recognition from the critics.

=== Breakthrough ===
Kamaiah landed her first major role through the Kannada film Chingari (2012), an adaptation of Taken, directed by Harsha. She acted alongside Darshan and Bhavana in the lead role. The film, centered around human trafficking went on to be one of the highest-grossing films for the year. Her portrayal of Geetha, trapped under human trafficking earned her favorable reviews with Rediff commenting "Deepika comes as a whiff of fresh air and does an adequate job for a newcomer". The NDTV Movies reviewer praised her for her "hardwork to make her presence felt". Following this success, she was offered many films in Tamil, Telugu and Kannada languages. She accepted a role as the protagonist for the film Neene Bari Neene directed by Deepak Thimmaiah.

She also subsequently signed for the upcoming film Auto Raja which also stars Ganesh and Bhama in the lead roles. She is also making her Bollywood debut in the Rajkumar Santoshi directorial Phata Poster Nikla Hero which stars Shahid Kapoor and Ileana D'Cruz. Kamaiah plays a cameo as a village girl and would be seen in the initial portions of the film She reportedly signed for Devaravne Bidu Guru in 2013.

== Filmography ==
Year	Film	Role	Language	Notes
2011	Aanmai Thavarael	Nandini	Tamil	
2012	Chingari	Geetha	Kannada	
2013	Auto Raja	Ragini	Kannada	Nominated, SIIMA Award for Best Supporting Actress
2013	Phata Poster Nikla Hero	CSO's Daughter	Hindi	
2014	Damaal Dumeel	Herself	Tamil	Special appearance in the song "Dhana Dhan"
2015	Neene Bari Neene		Kannada	Nominated-SIIMA Award for Best Supporting Actress-Female
2016	Jaggu Dada	Vishaka	Kannada	Guest appearance

== See also ==
- List of Indian film actresses
