= Rudra veena (disambiguation) =

Rudra veena is a large Indian plucked string instrument used in Hindustani music.

Rudra veena may also refer to:

- Rudraveena (film), a 1988 Indian Telugu-language film
  - Rudraveena (soundtrack), its soundtrack by Ilaiyaraaja
- Rudraveena (TV series), 2002 Indian Tamil-language television serial
