= Mane Maratakkide =

- Directed by: Manju Swaraj
- Written by: Manju Swaraj
- Based on: Anando Brahma by Mahi V. Raghav
- Produced by: S. V. Babu
- Starring: Sadhu Kokila; Kuri Prathap; Chikkanna; Ravishankar Gowda; Sruthi Hariharan; Karunya Ram
- Cinematography: B. Suresh Babu
- Edited by: N. M. Vishwa
- Music by: Abhimann Roy
- Production company: SV Productions
- Release date: 15 November 2019
- Country: India
- Language: Kannada

Mane Maratakkide (transl. House for Sale) is a 2019 Indian Kannada-language comedy horror film written and directed by Manju Swaraj. The film was produced by S. V. Babu under his banner SV Productions. It features Sadhu Kokila, Kuri Pratap, Chikkanna, Ravishankar Gowda and Sruthi Hariharan in the lead role. The music is handled by Abhimann Roy and the cinematography is by B. Suresh Babu. The film was released on 15 November 2019. The film is the official remake of 2017 Telugu film Anando Brahma. This movie released two weeks before Damayanthi, which was reported to be inspired by the same Telugu movie.

== Plot ==
Shravankumar decides to sell his father's house as his parents are no more. Rumors are that this house is haunted. In order to sell the house, Shravankumar agrees to give Raghupathi a ten percent commission if he stays in the house and proves that the house is not haunted. Raghupathi, Raghava, Raja and Ram are in need for money. All four stay in the house for five days. Spirits of a young woman, an old man, a small girl and a man try various ways to drive these four men away. All their efforts go in vain as each one reacts in a comical way to the ghosts. In the end it is revealed that Shravankumar had killed these four when they were asleep so that he could sell the house. The old man was his father, Sowmya, was the one who took care of his parents, Giri helped them and all of them gave shelter to an orphaned girl. It was only Shravankumar's mother who had escaped. In the climax after knowing the reason for their death, all the ghosts kill the goons who were trying to kill Raghupathi, Raghava, Raja and Ram. Finally, Soumya kills Shravankumar.

== Cast ==
- Chikkanna as Raghupathi
- Sadhu Kokila as Raghava
- Kuri Prathap as Raja
- Ravishankar Gowda as Ram
- Sruthi Hariharan as Sowmya
- Karunya Ram as Kamini
- Rajesh Nataranga as Shravana
- Shivram
- Sumithra as Bhagya
- Girish Shivanna
- Ashwath Ninasam as Inspector Devu
- Uggram Manju
- Karisubbu
- Mandeep Roy
- Shivaram
- Tabla Nani as Inspector
- Mangaluru Meenanatha

== Soundtrack ==
Mane Maratakikide

Soundtrack album by Abhimann Roy
- Genre: Feature film soundtrack
- Language: Kannada
- Label: D Beats
- Producer: S. V. Babu

The film's background score and the soundtracks were composed by Abhimann Roy. The music rights were acquired by D Beats.

All lyrics are written by Ashok Roy.

Tracklist
No.	Title	Lyrics	Singer(s)	Length
1.	"Raghupathi Raghava Raja Ram"	Ashok Roy	Margaret, Vyasraj, Badariprasad	2:40
2.	"First Time Lifeli"	Ashok Roy	V. Harikrishna, Chaitra H. G.	3:48

== Release ==
The film was released on 15 November 2019.

== Critical reception ==
The Times of India newspaper gave 2.5 out of 5 stars stating "Mane Maratakkide can be a good watch for those that like their frights light, with some laughs and predictable humour thrown in for good measure."

The New Indian Express newspaper gave 3.5 out of 5 stars stating "Sruthi Hariharan, even though has very less screen space, plays a very different role. Also seen with her is Shivaram, Giri, and Sumitra, who take the story forward. A special appearance by Karunya Ram in a song brings in the glam quotient. Cinematography by Suresh Babu comes handy as most of the scenes are shot indoors. The film has limited songs and Abhimanyu Roy's focus was more on the background score, and he has done a good job. If you are looking for some laughter, this film has an ample of it, in fact, four times more."

== Accolades ==
Karunya Ram Won Best supporting actress in 9th South Indian International Movie Awards
