= Rudraveena (soundtrack) =

Soundtrack album by Ilaiyaraaja
- Released: 1988
- Genre: Feature film soundtrack
- Length: 28:20
- Language: Telugu
- Label: Aditya Music
- Producer: Ilaiyaraaja

Ilaiyaraaja chronology
Nayakan (1988)	Rudraveena (1988)	Agni Natchathiram (1988)

Rudraveena is the soundtrack to the 1988 Telugu-language musical-drama film of the same name directed by K. Balachander, starring Chiranjeevi, Shobana, Gemini Ganesan, Ramesh Aravind. The soundtrack consisted of nine songs composed by Ilaiyaraaja with lyrics written by Sirivennela Sitaramasastri. Ilaiyaraaja's score was critically acclaimed and fetched him his third National Film Award for Best Music Direction and the second Nandi Award for Best Music Director.

== Development ==
Rudraveena is Ilaiyaraaja's fourth collaboration with Balachander after Sindhu Bhairavi (1985), Punnagai Mannan (1986) and Manathil Urudhi Vendum (1987). Sirivennela Sitaramasastri was approached to write the lyrics for the songs after his work in K. Viswanath's Sirivennela (1986) was noticed. According to screenwriter Ganesh Patro, Balachander wanted the songs to convey the story rather than serving the protagonists' dreams; Ilaiyaraaja used verses from the poetry anthology Maha Prasthanam, written by Telugu writer Sri Sri, in the song "Cheppalani Vundi".

== Release history ==
Rudraveena's soundtrack was released under Ilaiyaraaja's Echo Recording Company through double LP and cassettes. Each side of an LP consisted of six songs in an album, totally twelve in number; three instrumental tracks that were not titled which are performed in Nadaswaram (one being a rendition of the devotional song "Raghupati Raghava Raja Ram") were also included. Aditya Music which acquired the digital distribution rights from Echo, released the soundtrack through digital providers which consisted only nine songs, excluding the instrumental tracks.

== Track listing ==
Tulasi Dalamulace is a kriti written and composed by the Telugu Saint Poet Tyagaraja in the raga Mayamalavagowla

All lyrics are written by Sirivennela Sitaramasastri.

No.	Title	Singer(s)	Length
1.	"Nammaku Nammaku"	S. P. Balasubrahmanyam	5:31
2.	"Lalitha Priya"	K. J. Yesudas, K. S. Chithra	5:24
3.	"Taralirada"	S. P. Balasubrahmanyam	4:32
4.	"Cheppalani"	S. P. Balasubrahmanyam	5:42
5.	"Chuttu Pakkala"	S. P. Balasubrahmanyam	2:59
6.	"Tulasi Dalamulache"	K. J. Yesudas	4:13
7.	"Neethone"	K. J. Yesudas	4:19
8.	"Maanava Seva"	K. J. Yesudas	5:42
9.	"Randi Randi"	Mano, S. P. Sailaja	8:01

== Reception ==
Rudraveena is considered one of the acclaimed works of Ilaiyaraaja in Telugu cinema. K. Naresh Kumar of The Hans India commented that K. J. Yesudas and K. S. Chithra brought the song "Lalitha Priya Kamalam" to life "soothingly", adding that everything is right about the number in terms of instrumentation. Pulagam Chinnarayana of Sakshi praised Ilaiyaraaja's varied instrumentation in the re-recording and found Sitaramasastri's lyrics "optimistic and poetic". S. Subakeerthana of The Federal stated that in films like Sagara Sangamam, Sindhu Bhairavi and Rudraveena, "[Ilaiyaraaja] displayed his hold over Carnatic music by tackling some challenging ragas."

Archana Nathan of Scroll.in described the soundtrack as "brilliant" and reflected on the central themes of the film, which is the tussle between father and son over Carnatic music, but felt that "Taralirada" dwells deeper into the said themes. At the presentation of the Sri Raja-Lakshmi award in November 2006, Balasubrahmanyam performed the song "Taralirada" at Kalabharathi auditorium, Visakhapatnam.

== Accolades ==
Award	Category	Recipient(s) and nominee(s)	Result	Ref.
Nandi Awards	Best Music Director	Ilaiyaraaja	Won	
National Film Awards	Best Music Direction	Ilaiyaraaja	Won	
National Film Awards	Best Male Playback Singer	S. P. Balasubrahmanyam	Won	
