= Dance Dance (TV series) =

Indian television show

- Genre: Dance
- Developed by: Star Suvarna
- Directed by: Jai Achari
- Presented by: Shine Shetty
- Judges: Prajwal Devraj; Hariprriya; Harsha (director)
- Opening theme: Dance Dance
- Composer: Karthik Sharma
- Country of origin: India
- Original language: Kannada
- No. of episodes: 30

Production
- Producer: Jai Achari
- Production location: Bengaluru
- Camera setup: Multi-camera
- Running time: 60-75 minutes
- Production company: In House Productions

Original release
- Network: Star Suvarna
- Release: 20 August – 5 December 2021

Related
- Cookku with Kirikku

Dance Dance is a Kannada dance reality show aired on Star Suvarna and streams on Disney+ Hotstar. It features celebrities as contestants who are paired with professional dancers competing for a cash prize. It premiered on 20 August 2021. The judges of tha show are Prajwal Devaraj, Hariprriya and A.Harsha. The show is hosted by Shine Shetty.

== Production ==
The show is a competition wherein 12 celebrities are paired with professional dancers and compete against each other. Contestants dance to a different tune, different theme and different styles every week and scores are given by the judges. Each week one couple is eliminated based on Conestants voting and their scores.

== Contestants ==
A total of 12 celebrities, mostly TV actors, are coupled with dancing partners for the show..

#	Celebrity	Professional partner
1 (winners)	Monisha	Shlok
2 (Runner Up)	Mahendra	Harshitha
3 (2nd Runner Up)	Vittal Kamath	Soundarya
4 (finalist)	Kavitha Gowda	Prabhu
5 (finalist)	Koli Ramya	Gagan
6	Nayana Sharath	Manjunath Siddi
7	Jagappa	Nidhi Suresh
8	Karthik Ramesh	Sindagi
9	Smileguru Rakshith	Aditi
10	Ashvithi Shetty	Aditya
11	Vivek Simha	Mandara
12	Supritha Sathyanarayan	John Edwin

== Weekly summary ==
Week No.	Episode No.	Original Air Date	Couple Evicted Rank	Theme	Best Jodi Of The Week
1 Grand Premiere	1	20 August 2021	—N/a	Introduction	—N/a
1 Grand Premiere	Celebrity contestants were introduced with individual performances and were paired with professional dancers for the competition.				
2	2; 3	21 August 2021; 22 August 2021	—N/a	Mass Round	Monisha and Shlok
2	Shlok and Monisha & Kavitha and Prabhu steals the show in the mass round				
3	4; 5	28 August 2021; 29 August 2021	—N/a	Single Property Round	Mahendra and Harshitha
3	Contestants scorch the stage up, each pair delivering a more dazzling performance than the last.				
4	6; 7	4 September 2021; 5 September 2021	—N/a	Romantic Rain Round	Koli Ramya and Gagan
4	The romantic rain theme did induce some chemistry between the couples.; Aditi Prabhudeva was invited as the guest to perform where she sizzled with her rain performance.				
5	8; 9; 10; 11	11 September 2021; 12 September 2021; 18 September 2021; 19 September 2021	Supritha & John Edwin; Rank 12	Festival Celebration Round	Kavitha and Prabhu
5	The festival celebration theme had a lot of massive performances.; Sriimurali was invited as the guest for the festival celebration round.; Pranam Devraj was invited as a guest for the round.				
6	12; 13	11 September 2021; 12 September 2021	Vivek Simha & Mandara; Rank 11	Replica Round	Vittal Kamath and Soundarya
6	The replica round was mind-blowing as the contestants recreated the songs.; Ace actresses Sudharani and Shruti graced the show.				
7	14; 15	2 October 2021; 3 October 2021	—N/a	Folk Round	Monisha and Shlok
7	The folk round was filled with a lot of folklores where Shlok and Monisha stole the show.; Manvita Kamath was invited as the guest to perform where she sizzled with her folk dance performance.				
8	16; 17	9 October 2021; 10 October 2021	Ashvithi Shetty and Aditya; Rank 10	Blind Fold Round	Karthik and Sindagi
8	The blindfold round was filled with a lot of emotional performances.; Karthik and Sindagi, Vittal Kamath, and Soundarya stole the show.				
9	18; 19	16 October 2021; 17 October 2021	Rakshith and Aditi; Rank 9	Navarasa Round	Nayana and Manjunath Siddi
9	The navarasa round had stiff competition between the contests.; There were 7 golden performances in the round.				
10	20; 21	23 October 2021; 24 October 2021	—N/a	Marriage Round	Shlok and Monisha
10	The marriage round was filled with a lot of celebrations.; Shiva Rajkumar was invited as the guest for the round and to promote his film Bhajarangi 2.				
11	22; 23	30 October 2021; 6 November 2021	Jagappa and Nidhi Suresh; Rank 8	Creative Round	Karthik and Sindagi
11	The creative round had unique performances which were a delight for the viewers to watch; Manoranjan Ravichandran was invited as a guest with his Mugilpete film team to promote the film.				
12	24; 25	13 November 2021; 14 November 2021	Karthik and Sindagi; Rank 8	Battel Round	Mahendra and Harshitha
12	The battle round intended the tough competition among the contestants.; Jagappa had wildcard entry to the show.				
13	26; 27	21 November 2021; 22 November 2021	—N/a	Family Round	—N/a
13	The family round was filled with a lot of celebrations.; All the performances performed had golden buzzers.				
14	28; 29	27 November 2021; 28 November 2021	Jagappa Nayana & Manjunath Siddi; Rank 7 & Rank 8	Semi Finale Round	Vittal Kamath & Soundarya
14	The Semi Finale round was filled with a lot of power-packed performances and the judges kept the scores as secret.; Prajwal Devraj and his wife Ragini celebrate their wedding anniversary on the stage.				
15 (Grand Finale)	30	5 December 2021	—N/a	Grand Finale	—N/a
15 (Grand Finale)	Dhananjay was invited as a special guest for the grand finale.; The scores were kept as a secret by thejudges.				

== Weekly scores ==
The maximum points awarded for a couple is 30.

Danger Zone: Irrespective of scores, couples can be subject to eviction based on the contestants votes.

Week 1: The premiere week had no competition or scores.

Week 11: Marks were kept secret.

Week 14: Marks were kept secret.

Week 15: Marks were kept secret.

Dancing Star			Scoreboard													
Rank	Couple	←Total →	Week 2	Week 3	Week 4	Week 5	Week 6	Week 7	Week 8	Week 9	Week 10	Week 11	Week 12	Week 13	Week 14	Week 15
1	Monisha & Shlok	291.5	30	24.5	30	30	30	30	27	30	30	30	SM	30	SM	SM
2	Mahendra & Hrashitha	281	26	30	26.5	25.5	26.5	27.5	30	30	26	29	SM	30	SM	SM
3	Vittal Kamth & Soundarya	294.5	28.5	29	30	30	30	27	30	30	27.5	30	SM	30	SM	SM
4	Kavitha & Prabhu	280.5	30	27.5	24	30	27	27	30	30	30	25	SM	30	SM	SM
5	Koli Ramya & Gagan	293.5	23.5	30	30	30	30	30	30	30	30	30	SM	30	SM	SM
6	Nayana & Manjunath Siddi	279	28.5	30	28	24	24.5	27	30	30	26	27	SM	30	SM	
7	Jagappa & Nidi Suresh	256	26	25.5	17.5	29	27.5	25	30	21	26	24.5	SM	30	SM	
8	Karthik Ramesh & Sindagi	243	21.5	23.5	24.5	30	26.5	27	30	30	26	30	SM			
9	Rakshith & Aditi	203.5	27.5	26	30	24	27.5	28	25.5	15.5						
10	Ashwithi Shetty & Aditya	181	23.5	24	30	26	27.5	24	25.5							
11	Vivek Simha & Mandara	126.5	23	26.5	27.5	25	24.5									
12	Supritha & John Edwin	96.5	28.5	15.5	22.5	30										

indicates the couple in danger zone who faced eviction.
indicates that the couple withdrew.
NP indicates no points.
SM indicates secret marks .

== Guests ==
Name	Episode Date	Notes	Ref(s)
Puneeth Rajkumar	20 August 2021	Guest for Grand Premier	
Chandan Kumar	22 August 2021	To Support Kavitha Gowda & Promote his serial Marali Mansagide	
Priyanka Chicholi	22 August 2021	To promote their serial Manasella Nene	
Sameeksha	22 August 2021	To promote their serial Manasella Nene	
Aditi Prabhudeva	4 September 2021	Guest to perform	
Sriimurali	11 September 2021 12 September 2021	Guest for the round and to promote his film Madhagaja	
Pranam Devraj	18 September 2021	Guest for the festival round	
Sudharani	25 September 2021	Guest for the replica round	
Shruti	26 September 2021	Guest for the replica round	
Manvita Kamath	2 October 2021	Guest to perform	
Shiva Rajkumar	23 October 2021 24 October 2021	Guest for the round and to promote his film Bhajarangi 2	
Manoranjan Ravichandran	30 October 2021 6 November 2021	Guest for the round and to promote his film Mugilupete	
Dhanajaya	5 December 2021	Guest for the Grand Finale	

== Reception ==
The show gained massive success in the TRP Charts and it became one of the most-watched shows in both rural and urban areas.
