= Birugaali =

- VCD cover
- Directed by: Harsha
- Written by: Harsha
- Produced by: Adarsha Enterprises
- Starring: Chetan Kumar; Sithara Vaidya; Charisma Bharadwaj
- Cinematography: H. C. Venu
- Edited by: Deepu S. Kumar
- Music by: Arjun Janya
- Production company: Adarsha Enterprises
- Release date: 6 February 2009
- Running time: 134 minutes
- Country: India
- Language: Kannada

Birugaali (Kannada: ಬಿರುಗಾಳಿ) is a 2009 Indian Kannada language action film written and directed by Harsha making his second directorial after Geleya. The film stars Chetan Kumar of Aa Dinagalu fame along with Sithara Vaidya, Charisma Bharadwaj and Tara in main roles. The film featured the musical score by Arjun Janya which was received positively among the critics and masses.

The film was released on 6 February 2009 across Karnataka with a U/A certification for its excessive violence content. Upon release, the film generally met average reviews from the critics for its conventional script and audience.

== Cast ==
- Chetan Kumar as Hacchi
- Sitara Vaidya as Anju
- Charisma Bharadwaj
- Tara
- Kishore
- Mico Nagaraj
- Sadashiva Brahmavar
- Kuri Prathap
- Rajendra Karanth as Anna Sait
- K. D. Venkatesh

== Production ==
The lead actor Chetan Kumar underwent a rigorous body building regime developing a six-pack abs for his role. Director Harsha lauded his training skills at the audio launch and also told that the film would showcase his dancing skills which was not exhibited in his last film Aa Dinagalu. The film was shot in Greece locales for two songs and also included an under-water action scene.

== Soundtrack ==
Birugaali

Soundtrack album by Arjun Janya
- Released: January 2009
- Genre: Film soundtrack
- Label: Swarna Audio

The audio comprises a total of 7 original songs with 2 repeated tracks and one instrumental theme all composed by Arjun Janya. The audio launch took place at a Bangalore hotel in January 2009. Noted music director Gurukiran released the audio in the presence of entire film team

The audio was received very positively and the songs "Madhura Pisumaatige" and "Hoovina Baanadante", both written by Jayanth Kaikini, earned maximum positive reviews and were on the top of the charts for many weeks. The songs were also nominated at various award functions of the year 2009.

All music is composed by Arjun Janya.

Track listing
No.	Title	Lyrics	Singer(s)	Length
1.	"Amma Amma"	Ranganath	Srinivas
2.	"Macchi Sacchi"	Shivananje Gowda	Shankar Mahadevan
3.	"Jo Jo Laali"	Ranganath	K. S. Chithra
4.	"Helbide Helbide"	Kaviraj, Mahesh Kumar	Jassie Gift
5.	"Idhu Nanna Kathe"	Harshapriya	Vijay Prakash, Hamsapriya
6.	"Hoovina Baanadante"	Jayanth Kaikini	Shreya Ghoshal
7.	"Madhura Pisumaatige"	Jayanth Kaikini	Mohit Chauhan, Shamitha Malnad
8.	"Amma Amma"	Ranganath	Arjun Janya
9.	"Helbide Helbide"	Kaviraj, Mahesh Kumar	Arjun Janya
10.	"Theme"	Instrumental	Arjun Janya

== Reception ==
=== Critical response ===
R G Vijayasarathy of Rediff.com scored the film at 2 out of 5 stars and wrote "H C Venu's cinematography and Arjun's music are well done. Two chart buster songs Madhura Pisumaahige and Helbid Helbid written by Jayanth Kaikini and Kaviraj are very catchy. But all this doesn't take away the fact that Harsha's Birugaali is just old wine in an old bottle!" The Times of India scored the film at 2.5 out of 5 stars and wrote "It is a treat to watch Chethan excelling in romantic, action and sentimental sequences. Sitara is impressive. Tara is excellent. H C Venu walks away with honours for his brilliant camerawork. Music by Arjun is okay". A critic from The New Indian Express wrote "As the story develops, Hachu antagonises an underworld don. A police officer (played by Kishore), kills Anju but repents later for his action. Finally, Hachu decides to lead a lonely life. Despite all its shortcomings, Birugaali touches an emotional chord".

== Awards ==
- Filmfare Award for Best Female Playback Singer – Kannada - Shamitha Malnad
- Suvarna Film Award for Best Female Singer - Shamitha Malnad
- South Scope Film Award for Best Music Director - Arjun Janya
