= Kirat Bhattal =

Indian actress

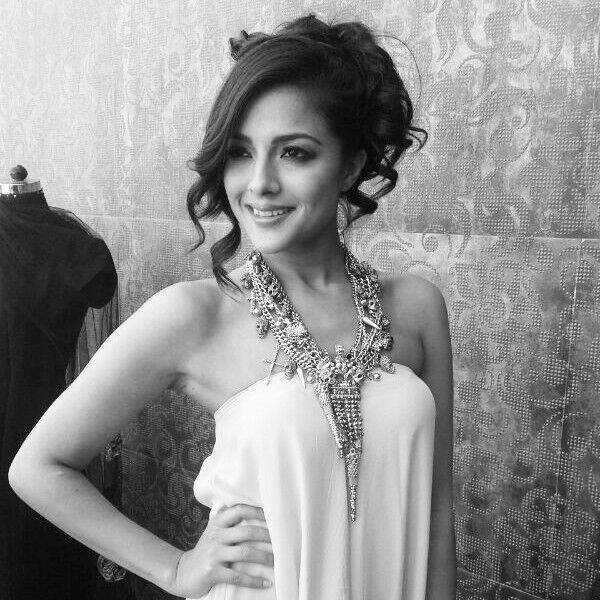
- Born: Kirat Bhattal; Monrovia, Liberia
- Other name: Kiki
- Education: Lawrence School
- Occupation: Actress
- Years active: 2005–2016
- Spouse: Gaurav Kapur (m.2014-2021divorced)

Kirat Bhattal (born Monrovia, Liberia), is an Indian actress. She started with modelling and later got a breakthrough in the Tamil film industry.

== Early and personal life ==
Kirat was born in Liberia, belongs to a Sikh family from Chandigarh. She was raised in Delhi and completed her education at the Lawrence School, Sanawar. She was married to Gaurav Kapur on November 2, 2014, later divorced in 2021.

== Career ==
Kirat signed up to do the project Desiya Nedunchalai 47 with Dhanush, but the project was delayed and later cancelled. As the film had remained inactive for about three months, Bhattal had signed onto a Kannada language movie titled Geleya opposite Prajwal Devaraj, which was declared a hit. Most recently, she accepted a guest role in the film Santosh Subramaniam, which is a remake of the Telugu language film Bommarillu, which stars Genelia and Jayam Ravi. She has got rave reviews for her role in the film even though it is a short one. She was also confirmed for the lead role in the Telugu film Yamadonga starring N. T. Rama Rao Jr., but turned it down at the last minute citing other commitments; the film went on to become a huge hit, grossing 30 crores in the first month of its release. She has also signed onto a Tamil film with director Krishna of Sillunu Oru Kadhal and Dorai, with Arjun Sarja in the lead role. She is also hosting a travel show called Life Mein Ek Baar- When Angels Dare with actress Barbara Mori, T.V presenter Archana Vijaya, model Diandra Soares and Yana Gupta. The first episode aired on 18 March 2013. She also hosted two seasons of Style and the City which aired on Fox Traveller. She hosted season 4 of Nat Geo Covershot: Heritage city on National Geographic, the first episode aired on 17 December 2016.

== Filmography ==
Year	Film	Role	Language	Notes
2006	Dongodi Pelli	Ratna	Telugu	Debut Telugu film
2006	Vattaram	Sangeetha Gurupadam	Tamil	Debut Tamil film
2007	Geleya	Nandini	Kannada	Debut Kannada film
2008	Santhosh Subramaniam	Rajeshwari	Tamil	
2008	Durai	Anjali	Tamil	
2009	Naa Style Veru	Divya	Telugu	
