= Auto Raja (2013 film) =

- Directed by: Uday Prakash
- Screenplay by: K. Nanjunda; Uday prakash
- Produced by: Vishwa; Girish
- Starring: Ganesh; Bhama; Deepika Kamaiah
- Cinematography: Manjunath. B. Nayak
- Edited by: K. M. Prakash
- Music by: Arjun Janya
- Production company: V San Visions
- Distributed by: Jayanna Combines
- Release date: 21 June 2013
- Running time: 158 minutes
- Country: India
- Language: Kannada

Auto Raja ( transl. Auto King) is a 2013 Indian Kannada-language romantic drama film written and directed by Uday Prakash, which stars Ganesh, Bhama and Deepika Kamaiah in the lead roles. The title is inspired by the popular Kannada film of the same title name released in 1980.

The film is produced jointly by Vishwa and Girish of V San Visions and the music is scored by Arjun Janya.

== Cast ==
- Ganesh as Raja
- Bhama as Radha / Rani
- Deepika Kamaiah
- Dileep Raj
- Dharma
- Arun Sagar
- Kavitha
- Sadhu Kokila
- Mamatha Rahuth
- Kuri Prathap
- Chandru
- Yathiraj

== Production ==
=== Development ===
Director Uday Prakash, who earlier directed the comic-caper, Kalla Malla Sulla came up with an idea to pay tributes to actor Shankar Nag who featured in the blockbuster hit Auto Raja in the year 1980. With the same title name, he changed the script suitable for this decade. The script was written in 2010 and he was on a hunt for lead actors suitable to reprise the role of Nag. He took almost one and half years to find a bachelor hero through a voting system

=== Casting ===
Uday Prakash came up with a unique idea of finding his lead actor by creating an online poll. It resulted in actor Ajay Rao being the unanimous choice and he was signed on for the same. However, the project got much delayed in taking off and the actor refused the role due to date issues. This resulted in further delay as Prakash went in search of many other younger heroes with nobody willing to accept the role. Later, actor Ganesh was approached and it took at least 20 days to convince him to sign in for the role. Malayalam actress Bhama was soon signed for the lead heroine. For the other heroine, director approached Chaitra Chandranath, a budding actress, who reportedly walked out due to clash of dates and contract signed for another production. Another young actress, Deepika Kamaiah replaced Chaitra and confirmed her dates for the second lead role. The film also made headlines when the lead actress Bhama who until then only did homely roles agreed to do an item dance for the film.

=== Filming ===
After a delay of nearly 2 years of pre-production and casting, the film was officially launched on 22 August 2012 at the Milk Colony playground in Malleshwaram, Bangalore. The launch was attended by actor Sudeep to light the lamp and flag off the film that was faced by Ganesh in front of an auto rickshaw. The filming was shot at a stretch for 50 days in Bangalore location.

== Box office ==
The film was completed 50 days and was declared as "Hit".

== Soundtrack ==
The soundtrack was composed by Arjun Janya.

| No. | Title | Singer(s) |
|---|---|---|
| 1 | "Preethi Mado" | Chandan Shetty |
| 2 | "Auto Raja Auto Raja" | Arjun Janya |
| 3 | "Sachin Batting Ge" | Arjun Janya |
| 4 | "Shame Shame" | Priya Himesh |
| 5 | "Node Node" | Arjun Janya |
| 6 | "Kannina Kaadige" | Chandan Shetty |

== Home media ==
The movie was released on DVD with 5.1 channel surround sound and English subtitles and VCD.
