= Kalloori Kalangal =

- Directed by: Remoo Shiva
- Written by: Remoo Shiva
- Produced by: D. Vasudevan; A. Srithar; S. R. Doss Reddy
- Starring: Sukumar; Priyanka Chandra
- Cinematography: D. Murugavel
- Edited by: D. Elumalai
- Music by: Rajesh Ramalingam
- Production company: Starting Point Cinema
- Release date: 3 September 2010
- Running time: 140 minutes
- Country: India
- Language: Tamil

Kalloori Kalangal (transl. College times) is a 2010 Indian Tamil language romantic drama film directed by Remoo Shiva. The film stars newcomer Sukumar and Priyanka Chandra, with L. Raja, Yuvarani, Dashrath Bhatt, Vanitha Krishnachandran, Manobala, Pandi, Dindigul I. Leoni, and Bayilvan Ranganathan playing supporting roles. The film had musical score by Rajesh Ramalingam and was released on 3 September 2010.

== Plot ==
Santhosh (Sukumar) and Kavitha (Priyanka Chandra) are college mates and good friends. Santhosh then falls in love with Kavitha but is feared to tell her his love, so he professes his love to her through anonymous calls and messages. Thereafter, Kavitha finds out that the anonymous caller is none other than Santhosh and accepts his love. When Kavitha's parents Shankar (L. Raja) and Vasantha (Yuvarani) come to know about their love, they scold her and force her to forget him. The same day, the two lovers meet up and understand that they cannot get married with their parents' support, so they agree to commit suicide by drinking poison at 7:00 PM when the church bell will ring. The two lovers split up after a long farewell and go back to their house. At Santhosh's house, his parents (Dashrath Bhatt and Vanitha Krishnachandran) find that Santhosh is acting strangely, and they learn about his thought of committing suicide. At 6:40 P.M., they stop him from doing so and convince him to save Kavitha. Santhosh's parents go to Kavitha's house to warn her parents while Santhosh decides to stop the church bell from ringing. Santhosh's parents manage to warn Kavitha's parents at 6:55 P.M, but they cannot open Kavitha's bedroom door. In the meantime, Santhosh fails to stop the bell from ringing, and Kavitha drinks poison when the bell rang. At the hospital, Kavitha dies holding Santhosh's hand.

== Cast ==
- Sukumar as Santhosh
- Priyanka Chandra as Kavitha
- L. Raja as Shankar, Kavitha's father
- Yuvarani as Vasantha, Kavitha's mother
- Dashrath Bhatt as Santhosh's father
- Vanitha Krishnachandran as Santhosh's mother
- Manobala as Professor
- Pandi as Dappa, Santhosh's friend
- Dindigul I. Leoni as Ganesha
- Bayilvan Ranganathan as Police inspector
- Boys Rajan as Doctor
- Rajini Nivetha as Professor
- Cool Suresh as Bus Conductor
- Poochi Senthil as Bus Driver
- Muthuraj as Santhosh's friend
- Rajini Senthil as Santhosh's friend
- Remoo Shiva as Mottai
- P. Jaganmohan

== Production ==
Remoo Shiva made his directorial debut with Kalloori Kalangal. Newcomer Sukumar signed to play the lead role while Kannada actress Priyanka Chandra was selected to play the heroine. The film was shot at several places near Erode. While shooting at Molagoundampalayam, the school there didn't have enough restrooms, so the film crew built restrooms for the school. The film crew also donated saplings to the organization Pasumai Ulagam to change the perception that film crews litter wherever they shoot.

== Soundtrack ==
Kalloori Kalangal

Soundtrack album by Rajesh Ramalingam
- Released: 19 February 2010
- Recorded: 2010
- Genre: Feature film soundtrack
- Length: 29:36
- Producer: Rajesh Ramalingam

Rajesh Ramalingam chronology
Madhavi (2009)	Kalloori Kalangal (2010)

The film score and the soundtrack were composed by Rajesh Ramalingam. The soundtrack features 6 tracks. The audio was released on 19 February 2010 in Chennai at AVM Studios. V. Sekhar and S. P. Muthuraman attended the audio function. S. R. Ashok Kumar of The Hindu said, "The songs of Kalloori Kalangal are passable".

All lyrics are written by T Sivasubramaniam.

Tracklist
No.	Title	Singer(s)	Length
1.	"Kalloori Kalanga"	Kousik	3:55
2.	"Indha Naal"	Yash Golcha	3:49
3.	"Kana Ondru"	M. Padmalatha	5:26
4.	"Seval Kodi"	Prabhakaran, Chithra Mahalingam, Remoo Shiva, D. Murugavel	5:16
5.	"Kana Ondru"	M. Vineeth	5:22
6.	"Manjal"	Kovai Murali, Bhargavi Shridhar	5:48
Total length:			29:36

== Release ==
The film was released on 3 September 2010 alongside five other films.
