= Vaira (film) =

- Official poster
- Directed by: Navarasan
- Written by: Navarasan
- Produced by: Dharmashree Manjunath. N
- Starring: Navarasan; Priyanka Malnad; Tabla Nani
- Cinematography: Nithin
- Edited by: Mahesh Reddy
- Music by: Ravi Basrur
- Production company: Geetha Entertainments
- Distributed by: Geetha Entertainments
- Release date: 6 October 2017
- Country: India
- Language: Kannada

Vaira is a 2017 suspense thriller film that was written and directed by Navarasan, who also starred alongside Priyanka Malnad and Tabla Nani. The music was scored by Ravi Basrur and the cinematographer was Naveen, with editing by Mahesh Reddy.

== Plot ==
The story revolves around the assignment of a fashion photographer who travels to Madikeri, there he meets a local girl, and falls in love with her. The investigation also leads to a haunted house. However, during his stay at Madikeri, he encounters a series of supernatural incidents and attempts to solve the mystery around them. The film is said to be inspired by real life incidents.

== Cast ==
- Navarasan
- Priyanka Malnad
- Tabla Nani
- Kempegowda

== Soundtrack ==
The music is scored by Ravi Basrur. The soundtrack was released on 9 August 2017, and featured 2 tracks. The lyrics were written by Kinnal.

Track listing
No.	Title	Lyrics	Singer(s)	Length
1.	"Preethiya Mullu"	Kinnal	Santhosh Venky	03:27
2.	"Manasaare Indu"	Kinnal	Santhosh Venky	03:33

== Reception ==
The Times of India rated the film at 3/5 stars, stating that it "can be a good one-time-watch for fans of horror, given that there has been a slump in recent times."
