= Extraaa Innings T20 =

Television series

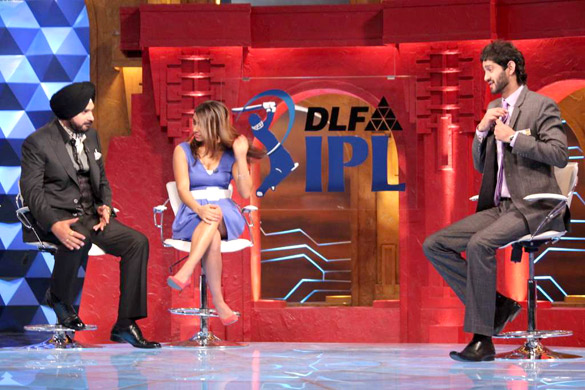
- Experts Navjot Singh Siddhu and Isa Guha and host Gaurav Kapur on the sets of Extraaa Innings T20
- Genre: Sport
- Country of origin: India
- Original languages: English; Hindi
- No. of seasons: 8

Production
- Production locations: Film City, Mumbai, India
- Camera setup: Multi-camera
- Running time: 120 minutes

Original release
- Release: 18 April 2008 – 24 May 2015

Extraaa Innings T20 (also popularly called 'Extra Innings') is a cricket based show telecast in between match sessions during the Indian Premier League (IPL) that covered match analysis and expert opinions from commentators, retired players and other experts in the sport. In any typical match, the show took place with a pre-match analysis, discussion during the match break and post match analysis. The show was hosted by television personalities along with ex-cricket players in Mumbai's RK Studio. The hosts took turns to traverse between the studio and stadiums during random match days which made it easier for them to have interactions and interviews with players during the course of the match. Drummers, dancers and cheerleaders were an integral part of the show. This, along with the stadiums almost always having a full house attendance with a carnival-like atmosphere had given the tournament a high television viewership since its inception in 2008. All these factors have made the IPL the most expensive sporting league in India. It broadcast its last episode on 24 May 2015 during 2015 IPL final. It was replaced by Star Sports Cricket Live after Star Sports bought the broadcasting rights.

== Hosts ==
Hosts usually take the role of introducing the expert panel, asking them questions and interviewing the players while on field. Extraaa Innings T20 was amongst the first sports show in India that included a predominant number of female anchors in a largely male dominated sport. Ever since, there has been an increase in the number of female commentators and hosts in India's franchise-based sporting events like the football and kabaddi. Archana Vijaya, an MTV VJ, has hosted the show in several seasons with her experience as an anchor in similar shows such as Tour Diary for extra cover and Cricket Masala mar ke. She was the only female anchor in the last edition of Extraaa Innings T20 as the other female hosts had prior commitments. Singer and model Shibani Dandekar has anchored the show in several seasons. Mandira Bedi, a prominent face in the television industry who was a host in ICC World Cups 2003 and 2007, had been a host in the 2009 season. Other female hosts who have featured on the show include Rochelle Maria Rao, Pallavi Sharda, Karishma Kotak, Shonali Nagrani, Mayanti Langer and Lekha Washington, with some of them having experience as hosts in various cricket talk shows.

Sameer Kochhar had been associated with the show since its inception. Describing the fun and glamour in the IPL to an interview with The Hindu, he said "Commentary here is not just about talking. It’s a lot about music, dance and well-tailored and colour-coordinated clothes." Gaurav Kapur is yet another prominent anchor bringing some light humor into the show. Other anchors who have had short stints include Shiv Panditt in 2008, Meiyang Chang in 2009, Ayushmann Khurrana and Angad Bedi in 2010.

== Experts ==
The experts answer questions and share their analysis of the match with the anchors. Several of these experts from the show also play the role of commentators during some matches. Navjot Singh Sidhu is amongst the most celebrated in the expert panel, managing to blend in his poetic commentary with light-hearted jokes and occasionally mentioning his peculiar thoko band to direct the drummer to beat the drums. Harsha Bhogle with his extensive experience as a commentator has appeared numerous times on the show, often switching roles as a commentator and appearing in presentation ceremonies. Other prominent figures from the cricketing world who are part of the panel include Ayaz Memon, Sunil Gavaskar, Danny Morrison, Ramiz Raja, Shoaib Akhtar, Waqar Younis, Aakash Chopra, Ajay Jadeja, Matthew Hayden, Atul Wassan, Arun Lal, Kapil Dev and Kris Srikkanth. Among the ex-players from the women's teams, commentators like Anjum Chopra from the Indian women's team and Isa Guha from the England women's team are among the others to have appeared on the show in the expert panel.

2015 introduced the concept of television viewers asking questions to the experts through social media, some of which would be answered or critiqued by the experts on the show. It also included a section called ‘what’s hot, what’s not’ wherein panelists would discuss the highs and lows in the match.

== Celebrity guests ==
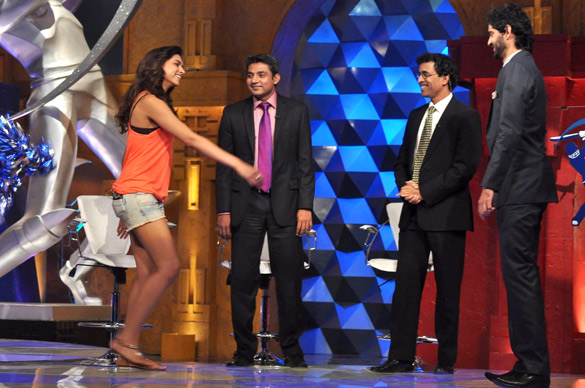
Actress Deepika Padukone (1st from left) with the experts and hosts of Extraaa Innings

The high amount of viewership generated by the IPL provides the bollywood and television personalities a chance to promote their movies and shows. Over the years, many well known actors have appeared on the show, often coming up with performances and songs to give the viewers a sneak peek into their upcoming projects.

Shah Rukh Khan, who usually remains present in the gallery rooting for his team, has appeared in the show to promote his movie Chennai Express. Deepika Padukone has been on the show multiple times, promoting Cocktail in 2012 and Piku in 2015. Other actors who have been on the show to promote movies and shows include Sanjay Dutt, Anil Kapoor and Arjun Kapoor, Karishma Kapoor, Tushar Kapoor and Ritesh Deshmukh, Siddharth Malhotra and Shraddha Kapoor, Shahid Kapoor and Priyanka Chopra, Amitabh Bachchan and Emraan Hashmi among others.

Professional wrestlers Ettore "Big E" Ewen and Kofi Kingston (of the WWE tag team The New Day) also appeared on the show, with Ewen displaying his cricketing knowledge due to his father playing cricket in Jamaica.
