= Thayige Thakka Maga (2018 film) =

- Film poster
- Directed by: Shashank
- Written by: Shashank
- Produced by: Shashank; Raghavendra P. S. Ramesh K.
- Starring: Ajay Rao; Ashika Ranganath; Sumalatha
- Cinematography: Shekar Chandra
- Edited by: Giri Mahesh
- Music by: Judah Sandhy
- Production company: Shashank Cinemass
- Release date: 16 November 2018
- Running time: 147 minutes
- Country: India
- Language: Kannada

Thayige Thakka Maga (Like Mother Like Son) is a 2018 Indian Kannada-language action drama film directed and produced by Shashank under Shashank Cinemas. It stars Ajay Rao, Ashika Ranganath and Sumalatha in the lead roles. The film marks 25th film for Ajai Rao and the first production venture for Shashank. Although the film borrows the title from the 1978 hit of the same name, the film reportedly does not relate to the earlier film.

Thayige Thakka Maga was released on 16 November 2018.

== Plot ==
Mohan Das is a karate trainer who suffers from anger management issues and becomes a crimefighter, where he is supported by his mother Lawyer "Point" Parvathi. Parvathi and Mohan learn about an accident involving a young boy named Puttaraju and his parents.

Mohan investigates and learns that Sharat Kaale, who is the son of a political leader Prathap Kaale (Krishna Hebbal), is behind the accident and other crimes. Mohan beats and insults Sharat, who along with Prathap attempts various ways to evade the law.

Mohan and Parvathi fight him in court, but lose the case due to Puttaraju's death. Suraj attacks Mohan outside, but Mohan Das motivates the people to fight and the people finally kill Sharat and Prathap in a stampede, while Mohan and Parvathi walk away.

== Cast ==
- Ajay Rao as Mohan Das
- Ashika Ranganath as Saraswati, Mohan's love interest
- Sumalatha as "Point Parvathi", Mohan Das's mother
- Achyuth Kumar as Saraswathi's father
- Sadhu Kokila as the trainer of a camp
- Saurav Lokesh as Suraj Kaale, Prathap Kaale's son
- Krishna Hebbale as Prathap Kaale
- P. D. Sathish Chandra
- Gopalkrishna Deshpande
- Radha Ramachandra
- Chindodi Vijaykumar

== Soundtrack ==
Thayige Thakka Maga

Soundtrack album by Judah Sandhy
- Released: 5 August 2016
- Recorded: 2018
- Genre: Feature film soundtrack
- Label: Anand Audio
- Producer: Judah Sandhy

Judah Sandhy has scored the soundtrack and score for the film. A total of six songs and one theme track were written by Jayanth Kaikini, Raghavendra C. S. and Shashank.

Track listing
No.	Title	Lyrics	Singer(s)	Length
1.	"Thayige Thakka Maga"	Shashank	Chandan Shetty	03:32
2.	"Hrudayake Hedarike"	Jayanth Kaikini	Sanjith Hegde, Sangeetha Ravindranath	03:47
3.	"Amma Ninna"	Shashank	Narayan Sharma	04:18
4.	"Usira Thantiye"	Shashank	Rap Sid, Siddharth Belamannu	03:25
5.	"Sakkare Naguva"	Raghavendra C. V.	Deepak Doddera	03:55
6.	"Usira Thantiye Unplugged"	Shashank	Rap Sid, Siddharth Belamannu	03:46
7.	"Anger Theme"	Instrumental	Judah Sandhy	01:21
