= Seena =

2009 film

- VCD cover
- Directed by: Basavaraj Bellary
- Produced by: S Murali
- Starring: Tarun Chandra; Priyanka; Anthara Reddy
- Cinematography: Jagadish Vali
- Edited by: S K Nagendra Urs
- Music by: A T Raveesh
- Release date: 8 May 2009
- Country: India
- Language: Kannada

Seena is a 2009 Indian Kannada-language film directed by Basavaraj Bellary starring Tarun Chandra, Priyanka and Anthara Reddy in lead roles.

== Cast ==
- Tarun Chandra as Seena
- Priyanka as Hrudaya
- Anthara Reddy
- Ramesh Bhat
- Rekha Kumar
- Ninasam Ashwath
- Petrol Prasanna
- Sathyajith
- Sadhu Kokila

== Music ==
Seena

Soundtrack album by A T Raveesh
- Released: 2009
- Recorded: 2009
- Genre: Feature film soundtrack
- Length: 30:15
- Language: Kannada
- Label: Anand Audio

A T Raveesh chronology
Nannedeya Haadu (2009)	Seena (2009)	Preethiyinda Ramesh (2010)

Official audio
- Seena- Full Album on YouTube

The film has music composed by A T Raveesh.

Track listing
No.	Title	Singer(s)	Length
1.	"Chanchala Notada"	Kunal Ganjawala	5:10
2.	"Kannale Kadodu"	Harshini	5:21
3.	"Jeeva Midiyuthide"	Hariharan	4:53
4.	"Yaaridu"	Madhu Balakrishnan	5:07
5.	"Gudu Gudu"	Anuradha Bhat	5:29
6.	"Minchu Balli"	Chaitra H. G.	4:55
Total length:			30:15

== Reception ==
=== Critical response ===
R G Vijayasarathy of Rediff.com scored the film at 1 out of 5 stars and wrote "Performance-wise, young Tarun comes a cropper in his first action role. But he is good in the song and dance sequences. Priyanka is much better, while the other heroine Anthara Reddy is okay. Ramesh Bhat and Neenasam Aswath just fill the bill. Simran Khan appears in an item number. Technically, the film is sound. Jagadish Waali has done a superb work behind the camera". A critic from The New Indian Express wrote "Veteran artists Ramesh Bhat and Sathyajith perform their roles with ease. Camera work and Music composition are better in the film. "Seena", however, drags on and on, and its unbelievable storyline does it in". A critic from Deccan Herald wrote "Tharun dances well, fights well. His biggest drawback is his voice which sounds just like that of a teenager subjected to a fresh attack of hormones. Priyanka is yet to master her expressions. Petrol Prasanna is simply disgusting while Ninasam Ashwath is wasted". A critic from Bangalore Mirror wrote "Basavaraj Bellary churns out one impossible scenario after another. The second half is slightly better where Priyanka does a decent job with her role. But enduring the first half is a challenge. Avoidable".
