= Karunya Ram =

Indian actress

- Born: Karnataka, Mandya
- Other name: Karunya Ram Gowda (2010-2012)
- Occupations: Actress; model
- Years active: 2010–present

Karunya Ram is an Indian actress who works in Kannada-language cinema. She is known for performing in the 2015 film Vajrakaya.

== Filmography ==
Year	Film	Role	Language	Notes
2009	Seena	Hrudaya	Kannada	credited as Priyanka
2009	10th Class A Sec		Kannada	credited as Priyanka Chandra
2010	Kalloori Kalangal	Kavitha	Tamil	credited as Priyanka Chandra
2011	Mathond Madhuvena	Mrudula	Kannada	credited as Priyanka Chandra
2011	Krishnan Marriage Story	Prospective bride	Kannada	Cameo
2014	Pongadi Neengalum Unga Kadhalum	Divya's friend	Tamil	
2015	Vajrakaya	Nandini	Kannada	
2016	Kiragoorina Gayyaligalu	Bhagya	Kannada	
2017	Eradu Kanasu	Swathi	Kannada	
2018	Cafe Garage	Cherry	Kannada	
2018	Kannakkol	Roja	Tamil	
2019	Gubbi Mele Brahmastra	Herself	Kannada	Special appearance
2019	Mane Maratakkide	Kamini	Kannada	
2022	Petromax	Kavitha	Kannada	
2022	Raymo	Prospective bride	Kannada	Cameo

== Television ==
Year	Title	Notes	Ref.
2016	Bigg Boss Kannada 4	Contestant	
2016	Super Minute	Contestant	
2016	KICK	Team Leader	
2021	Cookku with Kirikku	Kirikku	

== Awards ==
Film	Award	Category	Result	Ref.
Vajrakaya	5th SIIMA Awards	Best Supporting Actress	Nominated	
Kiragoorina Gayyaligalu	6th SIIMA Awards	Best Supporting Actress	Nominated	
Mane Maratakkide	9th SIIMA Awards	Best Supporting Actress	Won	
