= Damayanthi (film) =

2019 horror-comedy Indian film in Kannada language by Navarasan

- Theatrical Poster
- Directed by: Navarasan
- Written by: Navarasan
- Produced by: Sri Lakshmi Vrushadhri Productions
- Starring: Radhika Kumaraswamy; Saurav Lokesh; Sharan Ulthi; G. K. Reddy; Sadhu Kokila; Tabla Nani; Anjana
- Music by: R. S. Ganesh Narayanan
- Production company: Sri Lakshmi Vrushadhri Productions
- Release date: 29 November 2019
- Running time: 163 minutes
- Language: Kannada

Damayanthi is a 2019 Kannada mythological comedy horror film written and directed by Navarasan. The film is produced by Sri Lakshmi Vrushadhri Productions and is touted to be a mythological horror-comedy. The horror-comedy thriller set in the 80s, has Radhika, who features in three shades. The film has G. K. Reddy, in a pivotal role, along with Saurav Lokesh (Bhajarangi Loki), Anusha Ravi, Raj Bahadhur, Sadhu Kokila, and Tabla Nani as part of the cast. The movie was reported to be inspired by the 2017 Telugu movie Anando Brahma and released two weeks after the release of the official Kannada remake of the Telugu movie "Anando Brahma" which is Mane Maratakkide. The film is also being dubbed into Tamil and Malayalam with the same title and in Telugu language as Samharini.

== Cast ==
- Radhika Kumaraswamy as Damayanthi
- Saurav Lokesh
- Sharan Ulthi
- G. K. Reddy as Vijayendra Varma, Damayanthi's father
- Sadhu Kokila
- Tabla Nani
- Bala Rajwadi
- Anjana
- Raj Bahadur
- Naveen Krishna
- S.S.Ravi Gowda
- Honnavalli Krishna
- Kempegowda
- Mithra
- Anusha Rai
- Girish Shivanna
- Pawan
- Karthik
- Veena Sundar

== Production ==
In an interview with The Times of India, Radhika said that "I'm playing the role of a girl, who comes to the help of the people. This is a double shaded character in the movie. Bajrangi Loki is playing negative shade in the movie. Our scenes have come up very well,".

Shashikala, the famous voice behind Nagavalli's character featuring Soundarya in Apthamitra, has now dubbed for Radhika Kumaraswamy in this film. The makers conducted voice tests with 23 dubbing artistes, and finally decided to bring Shashikala on board.

“Even Radhika, who usually dubs for her films, felt that she will not be able to do justice with her voice, and then we decided to go with Shashikala. We were told that she has not been working for the last three years. However, she considered our request and completed dubbing for the film. With her voice, the character played by Radhika now reaches another level,” director Navarasan said in an interview with The New Indian Express.

== Soundtrack ==
Soundtrack was composed by R. S. Ganesh Narayanan.

- Amma Amma Damayanthi - Ranjith
