= Sarala Subbarao =

Indian movie

- Directed by: Manju Swaraj KR
- Produced by: Lohith H Nanjundaiah
- Starring: Krishna Ajai Rao; Misha Narang
- Cinematography: Pradeep Padmakumar
- Edited by: Basavaraj Urs
- Music by: B. Ajaneesh Lokanath
- Production company: Rion Creation
- Release date: 20 February 2026 (India)
- Country: India
- Language: Kannada

Sarala Subbarao is a 2026 Indian Kannada-language romantic drama film directed by Manju Swaraj K R and produced by Lohith H. Nanjundaiah under Rion Creations. The film stars Ajai Rao and Misha Narang in the lead roles, alongside Rangayana Raghu, Veena Sunder, Shriraam, and Rishika Naik in supporting roles.

Set in the 1970s in Mysore, the film follows the lives of Sarala and Subbarao as they navigate themes of love, tradition, and aspirations.

== Plot ==
The story portrays the journey of Sarala and Subbarao as they balance love, family responsibilities, and personal aspirations in 1970s Mysore. The narrative reflects the social values of the period, with emphasis on family bonds and traditions.

== Cast ==
- Krishna Ajai Rao as Subbarao
- Misha Narang as Sarala
- Rangayana Raghu as Narasimha Shastry
- Veena Sunder as Lakshmi
- Shriraam as Rajagopal
- Rishika Naik as Devyani

== Production ==
The film is loosely based on the Kannada novel Vasantha Gaana by Triveni(Anasuya Shankar). Director Manju Swaraj explained that while the novel provided a creative base, the screenplay was developed as a fictionalized version tailored for cinema.

Swaraj described the project as an attempt to capture the aesthetics of 1970s Kannada and Indian cinema, with attention to music, costumes, and cultural settings. Actor Ajai Rao called his involvement in the film a "personal and significant project that blends nostalgia with themes of love and family".

== Music ==
The music is composed by Ajaneesh B. Loknath, who also provided the background score. The soundtrack features retro-inspired compositions intended to reflect the 1970s period setting. The first single was released in May 2025.

== Reception ==
A Sharadhaa of the Cinema Express said that "By the end, it does not feel like a film you have watched; it feels like you have stepped into someone's preserved memory." Susmita Sameera of The Times of India said that "The film spends considerable time portraying their everyday moments, affectionate exchanges, playful conversations, and shared routines."
