= Durai (film) =

- Theatrical release poster
- Directed by: A. Venkatesh
- Written by: G. K. Gopinath (dialogues)
- Story by: Arjun
- Produced by: P. L. Thenappan
- Starring: Arjun; Kirat Bhattal; Gajala; Suma Guha
- Cinematography: V. Lekshmipathy
- Edited by: V. Krishnakumar
- Music by: D. Imman
- Production company: Sri Rajlakshmi Film Pvt Ltd
- Release date: 25 October 2008
- Running time: 151 minutes
- Country: India
- Language: Tamil

Durai is a 2008 Indian Tamil-language action film directed by A. Venkatesh, from a story by Arjun, and produced by P. L. Thenappan. It stars Arjun, alongside Kirat Bhattal, Gajala, Suma Guha, Vivek and Vincent Asokan. The music was composed by D. Imman, while cinematography and editing were handled by V. Lekshmipathy and V. Krishnakumar

== Plot ==
Raja, who does not remember his past and is haunted by vague memories, works with a cook for Arusuvai Ambi. A sequence of events leads Raja to recollect his real identity as Durai and sets out to avenge his family's death and find the truth behind the death of his mentor Deivanayakam, an honest politician.

== Cast ==
- Arjun as Durai/Raja
- Kirat Bhattal as Anjali
- Gajala as Meena
- Suma Guha as Sandhya
- Vivek as 'Arusuvai' Ambi
- K. Viswanath as Deivanayagam
- Vincent Asokan as Dharma
- Vennira Aadai Moorthy
- Shanmugarajan
- Amit Dhawan as Shanmugam
- O. A. K. Sundar as DC Eswara Pandian
- S. N. Lakshmi
- Stunt Gopal
- Kullamani
- Cell Murugan as Traffic Cop
- Kovai Senthil
- Chelladurai
- Vellai Subbaiah
- Telephone Raj
- Citizen Mani
- Karnaa Radha

== Production ==
The female lead role was initially offered to Padmapriya, who was later replaced with Kirat Bhattal. The film also marks the second collaboration of Arjun Sarja and A. Venkatesh after Vaathiyar(2006)

== Soundtrack ==
The music was composed by D. Imman. It includes a remix of the song "Raja Rajathi" from Agni Natchathiram (1988), composed by Ilaiyaraaja.

Song title	Singers	Lyrics
Adi Aathi	Jassie Gift; Timmy; Ramya NSK	Thabu Shankar
Aayiram Aayiram	S. P. Balasubrahmanyam	Thabu Shankar
Raja Rajathi	Karthik	Vaali
Unnai Maathiri	Udit Narayan; Shreya Ghoshal	Thabu Shankar
Veddaikkum Sonthakkaran	Karthik; Saloni	Thabu Shankar

== Critical reception ==
Chennai Online wrote "Durai is a movie for die-hard Arjun fans". The Hindu wrote, "The 'Action King' lives up to the sobriquet once again — stunts are a major draw of 'Durai'(U/A). It is his treatment of the story that is found wanting". Pavithra Srinivasan of Rediff.com wrote, "If you're a keen Arjun fan, you'll get plenty of opportunities to whistle and cheer. If not, you can at least doze your way through".
