= Geleya =

2007 film directed by Harsha

- VCD cover
- Directed by: A. Harsha
- Written by: Preetham Gubbi
- Produced by: B Basavaraju; B K Gangadhar; A Venkatesh; Kadur Umesh
- Starring: Prajwal Devaraj; Tarun Chandra; Kirat Bhattal
- Cinematography: S. Krishna
- Edited by: Deepu S. Kumar
- Music by: Mano Murthy
- Production company: Sri Mookambika Combines
- Release date: 19 October 2007
- Running time: 122 minutes
- Country: India
- Language: Kannada

Geleya (transl. Friend) is a 2007 Indian Kannada-language crime film directed by A. Harsha, a popular choreographer making his debut in direction. The script is written by Preetham Gubbi and the cinematography is by Krishna; all of whom had worked previously together for the blockbuster film Mungaaru Male. The film stars Prajwal Devaraj, Tarun Chandra and Kirat Bhattal in the lead roles with Duniya Vijay and Pooja Gandhi appearing in cameo roles.

The film released on 19 October 2007 across Karnataka and set high expectations for its storyline and the team. However, upon release, the film generally met with average reviews from the critics and audience. The film is a box office success.

== Plot ==
Guru (Prajwal) and Vishwa (Tarun), both from the same village, are best friends. They move to Bangalore in search of work and a better way of life. They join the anti-social group that is harming the everyday lives of Bangalore out of greed for quick money. Guru and Vishwa, by chance, join the two opposing gangs who are continuously at odds. Guru eventually kills Vishwa's boss, which enrages Vishwa, who vows vengeance on Guru's boss. Vishwa becomes the gang's leader and eventually kills Guru's boss. This causes a big fight between the two groups, and Vishwa's wife (Kirat) tries in vain to match up the old friends. A tough cop (Duniya Vijay) gets deployed to handle the case and what happens next forms the crux of the story.

== Cast ==
- Prajwal Devaraj as Guru
- Tarun Chandra as Vishwa
- Kirat Bhattal as Nandini
- Mico Nagaraj as Jayanna
- Kishore as Don Bhandari
- Bullet Prakash as Jungle
- Sithara Vaidya
- Ninasam Ashwath
- Prathap
- Duniya Vijay in a guest appearance
- Pooja Gandhi in a guest appearance
- Rakhi Sawant as an item number in "Naana Stylu Berene"

== Soundtrack ==
Geleya
- Soundtrack cover

Soundtrack album by Mano Murthy
- Released: 11 October 2007
- Genre: Feature film soundtrack
- Length: 28:33
- Language: Kannada
- Label: Anand Audio
- Producer: Mano Murthy

Mano Murthy composed the music for the film and the soundtracks. The album consists of six soundtracks.

Track listing
No.	Title	Lyrics	Singer(s)	Length
1.	"Ee Sanje Yaakagide"	Jayant Kaikini	Sonu Nigam	5:11
2.	"Nanna Stylu Berene"	Kaviraj	Rajesh Krishnan, Inchara Rao	5:14
3.	"Hudugi Malebillu"	Jayant Kaikini	Karthik, Priya Himesh	4:26
4.	"Kanasalle Mathaduve"	Jayant Kaikini	Shreya Ghoshal	5:15
5.	"Putagala Naduvina"	Jayant Kaikini	Praveen Dutt Stephen	3:56
6.	"Chaangu Balaa Changure"	V. Nagendra Prasad	Shankar Mahadevan	4:31
Total length:				28:33

== Reception ==
=== Critical response ===
R. G. Vijayasarathy of IANS rated the film two-and-a-half out of five stars and wrote, "Though Geleya is a well-made film in commercial standards, it should be said that the neither the director nor the producers of the film have thought of the social consequences of making such gangster films. And both the lead artists Prajwal and Tarun look like the kids who have just passed out from their schools". A critic from The Times of India rated the film three out of five stars and wrote, "While Prajwal Devaraj shows immense promise of being a future star, Tarun excels. Camerawork by Krishna is a treat for the eyes. And Mano Murthy’s music has many catchy tunes". A critic from Rediff.com wrote, "Geleya may well appeal to the young and the mass audience. In a nutshell the film is high on technical aspects, but low on content -- a clichéd fare with some entertaining moments".
