= Chingari (2012 film) =

- Theatrical release poster
- Directed by: A. Harsha
- Written by: A. Harsha
- Produced by: B. Mahadevu
- Starring: Darshan; Deepika Kamaiah; Bhavana; Srujan Lokesh; Yashas Surya; Madhu Guruswamy
- Cinematography: H. C. Venu
- Edited by: Deepu S. Kumar
- Music by: V. Harikrishna
- Production company: Mahashaila Cine Sankula
- Distributed by: Samarth Ventures
- Release date: 3 February 2012
- Running time: 163 minutes
- Country: India
- Language: Kannada
- Budget: ₹7 crore
- Box office: ₹12 crore

Chingari, alternatively spelled as Chingaari, is a 2012 Indian Kannada-language action thriller film written and directed by A. Harsha. The film stars Darshan, Bhavana and Deepika Kamaiah in the lead roles. The soundtrack is composed by V. Harikrishna. It is an adaptation of the 2008 film Taken. The film is also dubbed into Hindi as Chingaara.

== Plot ==
Dhanush is a CCB officer who attempts to rebuild his relationship with Geetha, who hates him due to a misunderstanding about her brother Vishwa's death without knowing that Vishwa was a drug addict. While overseeing security at a meeting for business tycoon Vineesh Malhotra, Dhanush and his team saves him from attackers, where Vineesh gives his phone number out of gratitude and tells him to ask for his help anytime. Dhanush learns that Geetha has flown to Switzerland with her friend Amrutha. Upon arriving at Switzerland, Geetha and Amrutha meet a handsome young stranger named Aravind who offers to share a taxi. Geetha and Amrutha go to Amrutha's cousins' apartment. After relucantly answering a call from Dhanush, Geetha sees men enter the apartment and abduct Amrutha.

When Geetha is dragged out from hiding, she yells a description of her abductor, following Dhanush's instructions. Dhanush hears someone breathing on the phone and tells the listener that he will not pursue the kidnappers if they release his girlfriend, but warns them that refusing to accept his offer will result in their deaths. The listener only replies "good luck" and terminates the call. Srujan, Dhanush's colleague, deduces that the kidnappers are part of a sex trafficking ring and identifies the listener as mob boss Marko. Based on previous abductions, Geetha and Amrutha must be found within 96 hours or they will likely be lost forever. With the help of Vineesh, Dhanush flies to Switzerland, where he breaks into the apartment and finds Aravind's reflection in a picture on Amrutha's phone.

Dhanush finds Aravind at the airport, trying to lure a female traveler. Dhanush gives chase in a stolen taxi. While fleeing, Aravind is suddenly killed by an oncoming truck. With his only lead dead, Dhanush turns to an old contact Yashas Surya, who is an officer in Swiss Police Department. Yashas warns him not to get involved, but informs him of the local red-light district where Dhanush plants a listening device on a pimp. Dhanush searches a makeshift brothel in a construction yard and rescues a drugged young woman who has Geetha's jacket. After a gunfight and high-speed chase with the brothel's operators, Dhanush takes the woman to a hotel and improvises her detoxification. The next morning, the woman tells Dhanush about a house where she and Geetha were kept.

Posing as Yashas, Dhanush enters the house under the pretense of renegotiating the police protection rate. When Dhanush identifies Marko by tricking him into saying "good luck," the meeting erupts into a fight which results in the deaths of several gangsters. Searching the house, Dhanush finds several heavily drugged girls, including Amrutha, who died due to overdose. Dhanush then tortures Marko with electricity, forcing him to confess that virgins like Geetha are quickly sold on the black market. Marko identifies the buyer as crime syndicate leader Bobby who is currently in President Palace. Dhanush leaves Marko to die from continuous electrocution and infiltrates a secret sex slave auction with his translator.

Dhanush finds that Geetha is the subject of the last sale, where he forces one of the bidders to purchase her, but is subsequently caught and knocked out. Learning about Dhanush's identity from Yashas (who is also involved in the trade), Bobby orders his henchmen to kill him, but the translator (who is also revealed to be a cop) helps Dhanush in killing Yashas and the henchman. Bobby reveals that Geetha was taken to a helipad before getting killed by the translator. Dhanush pursues the helipad and eliminates the bodyguards, where he finally finds Geetha, who later realizes her misunderstanding and reunites with Dhanush. In the aftermath, Dhanush and Geetha invites the translator to arrive and meet them at India as they greet her before leaving.

== Cast ==
- Darshan as Dhanush
- Deepika Kamaiah as Geetha
- Bhavana as a translator
- Srujan Lokesh as Srujan
- Yashas Surya as Yashas Surya
- Vera Prunn
- Richard Cobill as Jamshem
- Shille Manjunath
- Madhu Guruswamy as Vineesh Malhotra
- Teju as Aishu

== Release ==
Chingaari was released over more than 180 theaters on 3 February 2012, where it collected about ₹10 million (US$100,000) in its first day. The film was also released in some of the Bangalore theaters which were screening only non-Kannada films with a great success.

=== Home media ===
The satellite and digital rights were acquired by Star Suvarna and Disney+ Hotstar.

== Soundtrack ==
Chingari

Soundtrack album by V. Harikrishna
- Released: 2 January 2012
- Genre: Feature film soundtrack
- Label: Ashwini Audio

No.	Title	Lyrics	Singer(s)	Length
1.	"Baare Baare"	Kaviraj	Kailash Kher	4:15
2.	"Gamanava"	Jayanth Kaikini	Javed Ali, Shreya Ghoshal	4:18
3.	"Kai Kaiyya"	Yogaraj Bhat	V. Harikrishna	3:36
4.	"Nee Midiyuve"	Kaviraj	Soumya Mahadevan	3:56
5.	"Chingari Theme"		Instrumental	1:45

The audio release function was directed by A. Harsha. Sudeepa made the audio release on 2 January 2012. V. Harikrishna has composed 5 songs set to the lyrics of Kaviraj, Yogaraj Bhat and Jayanth Kaikini.

== Reception ==
=== Critical response ===
Srikanth Srinivasa from Rediff gave 3/5 stars and wrote "The movie is quite racy and finishes quickly, leaving us little time to get bored. However, its portrayal of a serious issue such as human trafficking and flesh trade is superficial". News18 gave 3/5 stars and wrote "Chingari is a well-made film with rich production values and top rated technical work". Bangalore Mirror gave 2.5/5 stars and wrote "Chingari is not even a non-brainy entertainer. A screenplay that takes obvious shortcuts to take the story forward kills the joy of the standard this film sets in terms of technical brilliance". B. S. Srivani from Deccan Herald wrote "This Chingari sputters out (for Darshan's mass fans) after a brief brilliance".

=== Box office ===
The film grossed ₹6 crore according to the distributor. The distributor's share would be about ₹5 crore in the first week of its release. The film completed 50 days in 10 theatres.
