= Agni Natchathiram (soundtrack) =

Tamil-language film soundtrack

Soundtrack album by Ilaiyaraaja
- Released: 1987
- Genre: Feature film soundtrack
- Length: 27:32
- Language: Tamil
- Label: Echo
- Producer: Ilaiyaraaja

Agni Natchathiram is the soundtrack to the 1988 Tamil-language film of the same name directed by Mani Ratnam and produced by G. Venkateswaran, starring Prabhu, Karthik, Amala and Nirosha. The film featured Ratnam's norm collaborators—composer Ilaiyaraaja and lyricist Vaalee—whose soundtrack album featured six tracks. It was released through the Echo label as a double LP record, with three tracks on each side. The soundtrack consisted of electronic and synth-pop music, with most of the Carnatic melodies in the songs fused with modern instrumentation. For the Telugu dubbed version titled Gharsana, all the lyrics are written by Rajasri.

== Development ==
As Agni Natchathiram was filmed simultaneously with Nayakan (1987), Ilaiyaraaja also worked on both films, with the latter's score consisting only of orchestral and string instruments—recorded in the mornings and the former in the evenings. Its music predominantly consisted of electronic and synth-pop; Ratnam's influence of western media through vidéothèques interested him to make a "Hollywood-style urban action film" but failing to do so, he instead decided to use electronic music in the film's score "to push the envelope in terms of style"; Ilaiyaraaja too had an exposure with the genre, as he previously used synthesizers for composing Punnagai Mannan (1986).

"Raaja Raajathi" was composed without string instruments; it fused synth-pop with jazz in the second interlude, and drums were played by drummer R. Purushothaman. The opening stanza of the song was composed with two notes. Despite the dominance of electronic music, most of the songs were set in Carnatic ragas; "Vaa Vaa Anbe Anbe" is in Shivaranjani, "Thoongatha Vizhigal" is in Amritavarshini, "Oru Poonga Vanam" is in Sudhadhanyasi, and "Ninnukkori Varnam" is in Mohanam. The song was sampled with synthesizers in the interludes.

== Track listing ==
All lyrics are written by Vaalee.

Tamil
No.	Title	Singer(s)	Length
1.	"Raaja Raajathi"	Ilaiyaraaja	4:42
2.	"Oru Poonga Vanam"	S. Janaki	4:25
3.	"Vaa Vaa Anbe Anbe"	K. J. Yesudas, K. S. Chithra	4:40
4.	"Ninnukori Varnam"	K. S. Chithra	4:37
5.	"Thoongatha Vizhigal"	K. J. Yesudas, S. Janaki	4:41
6.	"Roja Poo Adivanthathu"	S. Janaki	4:27
Total length:			27:32

All lyrics are written by Rajasri.

Telugu
No.	Title	Singer(s)	Length
1.	"Kurisenu Virijallule"	Vani Jairam, S. P. Balasubrahmanyam	4:40
2.	"Neeve Amara"	K. S. Chithra, S. P. Balasubrahmanyam	4:40
3.	"Oka Brundavanam"	Vani Jairam	4:29
4.	"Ninnukori Varnam"	K. S. Chithra	4:44
5.	"Raaja Raajadi"	S. P. Balasubrahmanyam	4:32
6.	"Rojalo Letha"	Vani Jairam	4:30
Total length:			27:35

== Reception ==
Srushtisagar Yamunan of Scroll.in called Agni Natchathiram the "trendsetter" for introducing "the sounds of electronic funk and synthetic pop" to Tamil music listeners. The album achieved significant popularity post-release, with the track "Ninnukori Varanam" in particular. At the 9th Cinema Express Awards, Ilaiyaraaja won the Best Music Director award for his work in the film, along with Soora Samhaaram and Dharmathin Thalaivan.

== Legacy ==
Anand–Milind adapted the song "Raaja Rajadhi" as "Tap Tap Tapori" for Baaghi (1990), and they also adapted "Thoongatha Vizhigal" as "Main To Deewani Hui" for the film's Hindi remake Vansh (1992). "Ninnukori Varnam" was sampled by musician Karthik for "Thooriga" from "Guitar Kambi Mele Nindru", an episode of Navarasa (2021). "Raja Rajadhi" was remixed by D. Imman for the film Durai (2008). In 2020, independent artists Malfnktion and Raka Ashok released an extended play, named Raaja Beats, which juxtaposed Ilaiyaraaja's songs with bass and hip-hop samples. Three of the songs: "Raaja Rajadhi", "Vaa Vaa Anbe" and "Ninnukori Varnam" were sampled for the album.

== Popular culture ==
The song "Ninnu Kori Varnam" was parodied for a comedy sequence in the film Themmangu Paattukaaran (1997) featuring Goundamani, Senthil and LIC Narasimhan, where the latter comically pronounces the first line of the song. "Raaja Rajadhi" was parodied in the film 7/G Rainbow Colony (2004), where Ravi Krishna and his friends perform the song on stage. The song "Ninnu Kori Varnam" inspired the title of a 2017 Telugu film, Ninnu Kori.
