= Kuri Prathap =

Indian actor and comedian

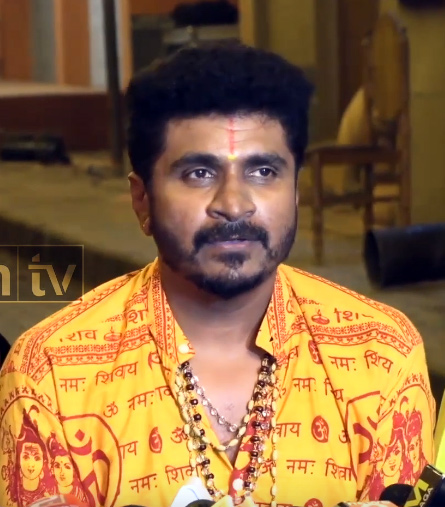
- Prathap in 2020
- Occupations: Film actor; comedian; television artist
- Years active: 2007–present
- Known for: Majaa Talkies, Bigg Boss Kannada (season 7)

Prathap, better known as Kuri Prathap, is an Indian actor in the Kannada film industry. He made his debut in the movie Sixer (2007), and went on to cast in many commercial films. Some films Prathap worked as an actor include Mylari (2010), Godfather (2012), Brindavana (2013), and Auto Raja (2013).

== Career ==
Prathap earned the name Kuri Prathap from the comedy show Kurigalu Saar Kurigalu on Udaya TV. He has featured on the prank show called Kuri Bond as well as Majaa Talkies and Bigg Boss Kannada season 7.

== Filmography ==
Year	Film	Role	Notes
2007	Sixer		Uncredited role
2007	Poojari		
2007	Anatharu		
2007	Geleya		
2008	Satya in Love		
2008	Bandhu Balaga	Villager	
2008	Nee Tata Naa Birla		
2008	Anthu Inthu Preethi Banthu	Sunil	
2008	Navagraha	Sub-inspector Prathap	
2009	Birugaali		
2009	Jaaji Mallige		
2009	Rajani		
2009	Raam		
2010	Aithalakkadi		
2010	Mr. Theertha	Theertha's sidekick	
2010	Olave Vismaya		
2010	Sanchari		
2010	Nam Areal Ond Dina		
2010	Kari Chirathe		
2010	Jothegara		
2010	Mylari		
2010	Vaare Vah	Adi's friend	
2011	Gun		
2011	Khadeemaru		
2011	Vinayaka Geleyara Balaga		
2011	Yogaraj But	Flower vendor	
2011	90		
2012	Shakti		
2012	Ko Ko		
2012	Snehitaru		
2012	Mr. 420		
2012	Godfather	Vijay's friend	
2012	Nandeesha		
2013	Case No. 18/9		
2013	Radhan Ganda	Shivu	
2013	Auto Raja		
2013	Victory	Police constable	
2013	Brindavana		
2013	Cool Ganesha		
2014	Brahma		
2014	Agraja		
2014	Pungi Daasa	Ramadasa's friend	
2014	Jai Lalitha	Prathap	
2014	Adyaksha		
2014	Super Ranga		
2014	Software Ganda	Venu	
2015	Raja Rajendra	Sorcerer	
2015	Ranna	Bhaskar's assistant	
2015	Vajrakaya		
2015	Red Alert		
2015	Ramleela		
2016	Kathe Chitrakathe Nirdeshana Puttanna		
2016	Tyson		
2016	Bullet Rani		Simultaneously shot in Telugu
2016	Jai Maruthi 800		
2016	Mr. Mommaga	Auto driver	
2016	Bhujanga		
2016	Kalpana 2		
2016	Deal Raja		
2016	Kotigobba 2	Shop owner	Simultaneously shot in Tamil
2016	Mukunda Murari	Insurance Company Official	
2017	Eradu Kanasu		
2017	Pataki	Prathap	
2017	Bharjari		
2017	Tarak		
2018	Raju Kannada Medium		
2018	Nanjundi Kalyana		
2018	Prema Baraha	Madhu's friend	
2018	MLA		
2018	Raja Loves Radhe	Chikka	
2018	The Villain	'Kowde' Shastri	
2019	Mane Maratakkide	Raja	
2021	Pogaru		
2021	Bhajarangi 2	Baddi	
2021	Sakath	Bhupathy	
2023	Fighter	Bhajarangi	
2023	Bad Manners	Muniraju	
2025	Junior		Simultaneously shot in Telugu

=== Television ===
List of Kuri Prathap television credits
Year	Title	Role	Channel	Notes	Ref.
2012	Kurigalu Saar Kurigalu	Host	Udaya TV		
2014	Kuri Bond		Udaya TV		
2015-2020	Majaa Talkies	Kadle Puri	ETV Kannada		
2019-2020	Bigg Boss Kannada season 7	Contestant	Colors Kannada	1st runner-up	
2022-2023	Super Queen	Host	Zee Kannada		

== See also ==
- List of people from Karnataka
- Cinema of Karnataka
- List of Indian film actors
- Cinema of India
