= Gaurav Kapur =

Indian actor and television presenter (born 1981)

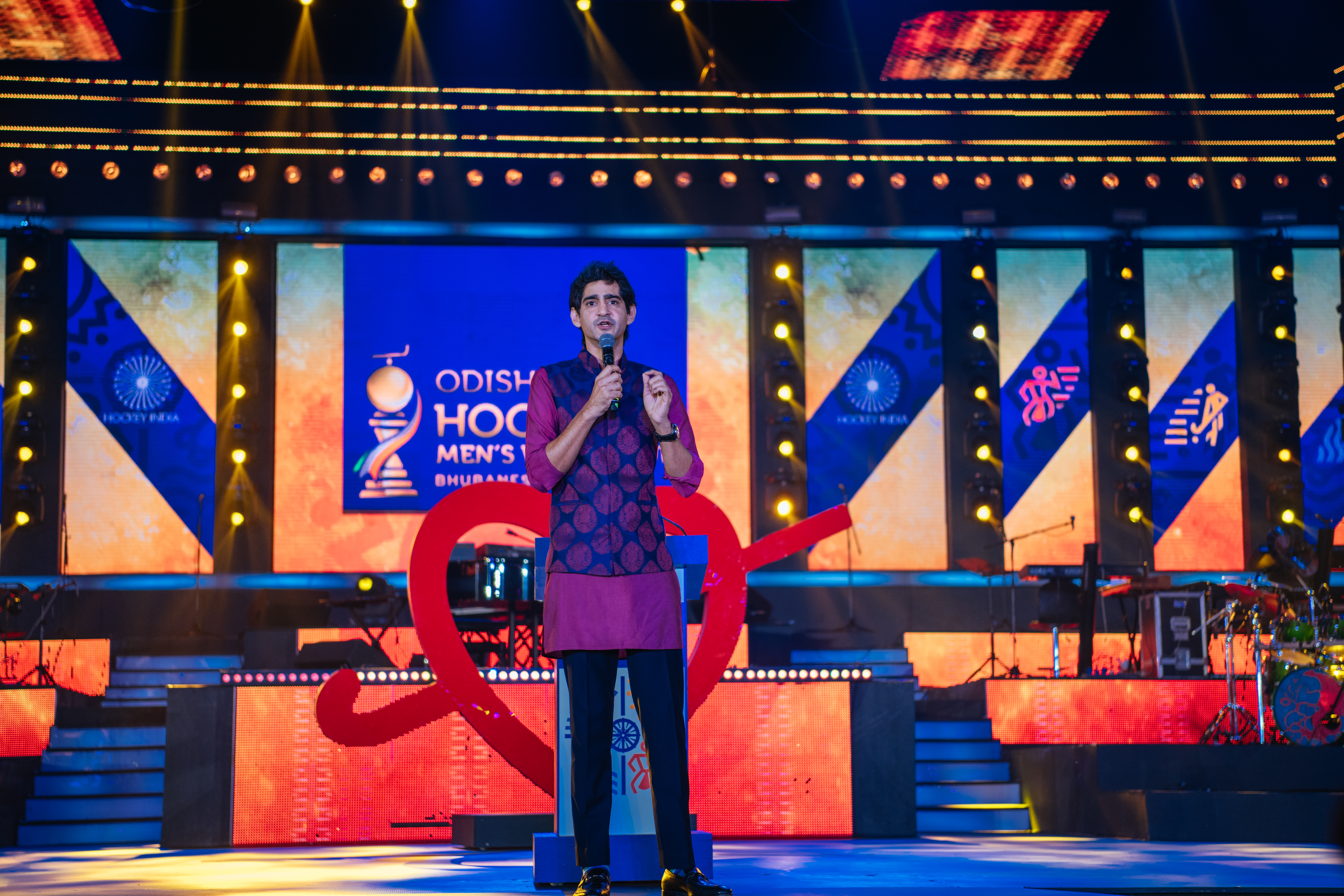
- Gaurav Kapur in Opening Ceremony Hockey World Cup 2018 in Odisha
- Born: 11 April 1981 (age 45); New Delhi, India
- Occupations: Actor, presenter
- Years active: 2003–present
- Known for: Extraaa Innings T20, Breakfast with Champions
- Spouses: Kirat Bhattal (m. 2014; div. 2021); Kritika Kamra (m. 2026)

Gaurav Kapur (born 11 April 1981), also spelled as Gaurav Kapoor is an Indian actor, television and cricket presenter known for being the host of the pre-match Indian Premier League show, Extraaa Innings T20, Cricbuzz Live and his YouTube show Breakfast with Champions.

== Career ==
Gaurav was seventeen when he started working on FM. After beginning as a radio jockey, he did a travel show called Indian holiday on Sony Television which explored scenic Indian locations with Anu Malhotra and Mini Mathur. Subsequently, he worked as a VJ on Channel V. He made his Bollywood debut with Darna Mana Hai in 2003 playing a character named Romi. In the same year he acted in another horror movie Ssssshhhh. He then worked in Chai Pani Etc. in 2004 which was a comedy film by Manu Rewal and White Rainbow in 2005. He also worked in the comedy film Kudiyon Ka Hai Zamaana and acted as Ahmed in Ram Gopal Varma Ki Aag which was a remake of Sholay.

In 2008, several films in which he worked on were released including Secrets of the Seven Sounds, Quick Gun Murugun, The Mole and Ugly Aur Pagli. Notably in the same year, he worked with Anupam Kher and Naseeruddin Shah in Neeraj Pandey's A Wednesday.

Gaurav Kapur played the lead in the comedy Bad Luck Govind (2009) that opened to mixed reviews. He appeared in the film Saluun in 2009. In 2011, he appeared in Chala Mussaddi - Office Office.

He hosted the cricket based talk show Extraaa Innings T20 from 2008 to 2017, covering the Indian Premier League.

In March 2017, Gaurav started a web series called 'Breakfast with Champions' where he interviews and interacts with cricketers and other sports athletes. Many including Steve Smith, Michael Holding, Shoaib Akhtar, Gary Kirsten, Zaheer Khan, Harbhajan Singh, Yuvraj Singh with wife Hazel Keech, Ashish Nehra, Danny Morrison, Gautam Gambhir, Ajinkya Rahane, Dwayne Bravo, Matthew Hayden, Virat Kohli, Cheteshwar Pujara, Rohit Sharma, Sourav Ganguly, Sachin Tendulkar, Rahul Dravid, Smriti Mandhana, Shikhar Dhawan, Yuzvendra Chahal, Kuldeep Yadav, Bhuvneshwar Kumar, Rashid Khan, Parthiv Patel, Ravi Shastri, Harmanpreet Kaur, Jemimah Rodrigues, David Warner, Mithali Raj, Abhinav Bindra, Leander Paes and Geeta Phogat have appeared on this show.

Gaurav Kapur co-founded Kommune Arts Private Limited, a performance arts collective, with Ankur Tewari and Roshan Abbas in July 2017.

In 2018, he joined Cricbuzz LIVE as an anchor, an online based cricket talk show covering the Indian Premier League and other Indian cricket team matches.

Kapur co-created and wrote the 2025 Netflix crime drama series Dabba Cartel alongside Shibani Akhtar, Vishnu Menon, and Akanksha Seda.

== Personal life ==
Gaurav completed his schooling in Mount St. Mary's School. He completed his undergraduate degree in Sri Venkateswara College in Delhi.

He married actress Kirat Bhattal on 3 November 2014 in Chandigarh. They divorced in 2021.

He resides in Bandra, Maharashtra. Gaurav married actress Kritika Kamra on 11 March 2026.

=== Business interests ===
In April 2016, Gaurav started a dedicated sports media and production agency named Oaktree Creative Solutions.

== Filmography ==
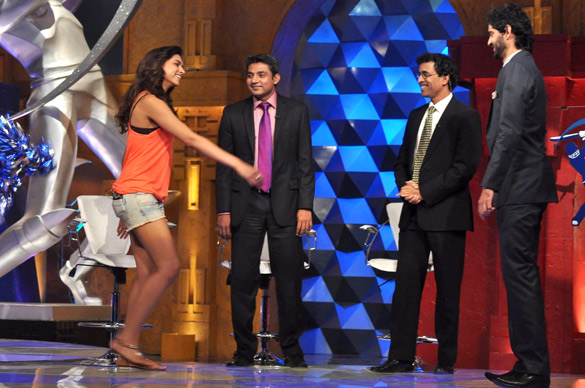
Gaurav Kapur (rightmost) hosting Extraaa Innings T20

=== Films ===
Year	Title	Role
2003	Darna Mana Hai	Romi
2003	Sssshhh...	Rajat
2004	Chai Pani Etc.	Harish
2005	White Rainbow	Gaurav Kapoor
2006	Kudiyon Ka Hai Zamana	Rahul
2007	Ram Gopal Verma ki Aag	Ahmed
2008	The Mole	The Assassin
2008	Ugli Aur Pagli	Hemal
2008	A Wednesday!	Ajay Khanna
2009	Bad Luck Govind	Govind Surender Sharma
2009	Saluun	Asok
2009	Quick Gun Murugun	Cameo appearance
2011	Chala Mussaddi - Office Office	Bunty M. Tripathii
2013	Kai Po Che!	Cricket Commentator

=== Television ===
Year	Title	Role	Notes
2006–2007	The Great Indian Comedy Show	Himself	Host
2008–2015	Extraaa Innings T20	Himself	Host
2018–Present	Cricbuzz Live (Hindi and English)	Himself	Host

== Awards and nominations ==
Year	Award	Category	Result
2012	EC Live Quotient Awards	Best Anchor (Media Personality)(Male)	Won
