= Manju Swaraj =

Indian film director and screenwriter (born 1982)

- Born: Manjunath.K.R; 6 October 1982 (age 43); Mysore, Karnataka, India
- Occupations: Director, Screenwriter
- Years active: 2005 - Present
- Spouse: Sahana (m. 2016)
- Children: Suggi Sambhram
- Relatives: Prof.M.Krishne Gowda (Uncle)

Manju Swaraj is an Indian film director, screenwriter who works in Kannada cinema. He directed films like Shravani Subramanya (2013), Srikanta (2017), Pataki (2017) and Mane Maratakkide (2019).

== Personal life ==
Manju Swaraj married Sahana in 2016.

== Filmography ==
Year	Film	Notes
2009	Shishira	
2013	Shravani Subramanya	
2017	Srikanta	
2017	Pataki	
2019	Mane Maratakkide	
2026	Sarala Subbarao	
