= Bhajarangi 2 =

2021 Indian film by A. Harsha

- Theatrical release poster
- Directed by: A. Harsha
- Written by: A. Harsha
- Produced by: Jayanna-Bogendra
- Starring: Shiva Rajkumar; Shruthi; Bhavana; Saurav Lokesh; Dushyanth Rai; Cheluvaraj; Prakash Thuminad; Kuri Prathap
- Cinematography: Swamy J. Gowda
- Edited by: Deepu S. Kumar
- Music by: Arjun Janya
- Production company: Jayanna Films
- Distributed by: Jayanna Combines
- Release date: 29 October 2021
- Running time: 155 minutes
- Country: India
- Language: Kannada

Bhajarangi 2 is a 2021 Indian Kannada-language fantasy action film written and directed by A. Harsha, and produced by Jayanna-Bogendra under the banner of Jayanna Combines. It stars Shiva Rajkumar in a dual role, alongside Shruthi, Bhavana and Cheluvaraj in the lead roles, while Kuri Prathap, Dusyanth Rai, Saurav Lokesh, and Prakash Thuminad appears in other supporting roles. Despite the title, the film is not a sequel to the 2013 film Bhajarangi and is a namesake sequel.

The film was released theatrically on 29 October 2021 and received mixed-to-positive reviews from critics.

== Plot ==
Araka, a tribesman, makes money by producing drugs from Ayurvedic plants, found in his territory, and selling them. Sudheendra, a priest, has been performing penance for many years, with the help of a sage.

One day, a seller buys drugs from Araka, and the drugs earn him a profit. He asks Araka for a truckload of drugs to sell, but Araka's assistant tells him that it is not easy to produce them due to the shortage of labour. The seller advises them that many people in the nearby villages can be kidnapped for labor. While celebrating a festival, the villagers are suddenly attacked and captured by Araka's men. Anji tries to stop him as his sister Alamelamma and girlfriend Chinminiki are also captured, but is beaten and thrown out of the village by Araka.

Araka's assistant stops him, where Araka gets enraged and decapitates his assistant. Araka takes all the captured villagers. Anji gets dejected about failing to save the villagers from Araka and commits suicide in Sudheendra's cave. Suddenly, a supernatural force from the sky arrives, where the sage notices the sky and takes Anji's soul. It is revealed that Araka once had an enemy in the form of Bhajarangi, a forest officer and Anji's doppelgänger. Bhajarangi had freed the tyrannical rule of Araka's father Jagrava by killing him, due to which Araka poisoned the village and killed his own tribesman, having betrayed Jagrava and joined Bhajarangi in the first place.

Anji's body is now taken to Sudheendra, where he uses his kundalini energy to summon Lord Vishnu, who lets Bhajarangi's soul possess Anji and heads to finish Araka. Anji/Bhajarangi arrives at Araka's den and finishes him off. Bhajarangi tells Sudheendra to spread the awareness of Ayurveda, to which he agrees. Sudheendra provides his knowledge to Anji and dies, where Anji revives and continues Sudheendra's mission.

== Cast ==
- Shiva Rajkumar as(dual role)
  - Bhajarangi
  - Aanji
- Shruthi as Alamelamma
- Bhavana as Chinminiki
- Saurav Lokesh as Sudheendra, companion of Bhajarangi, later becomes a powerful priest with the help of a Sage
- Shivraj K. R. Pete as Chinminki's assistant
- Cheluvaraj as Araka, Jagrava's son
- Prasanna Baagin as Jaagrava, head of the Kiraki dynasty
- Vajragiri as Sage
- Babu Hirannayya as a doctor
- Veena Ponnappa as a lady doctor
- Papa Pandu Shalini as Hoovamma, Bride
- Prakash Thuminad as Alamelamma's husband
- Kuri Prathap as Baddi, assistant in Alamelamma's house

== Production ==
In October 2017, Harsha announced "Raana" with Yash amidst much fanfare. But Yash was not too happy with the script that Harsha had presented to him. Sources add that when Harsha presented the actor with the complete script, he wasn't too happy and had reportedly told the director to fine-tune it to meet his approval standards. Further, with the director's track record not being up to scratch, Yash's well-wishers reportedly advised him to put Raana in cold storage for the time being. Harsha replaced Yash with Shivrajkumar in the movie and eventually, renamed the movie as "Bhajarangi 2"

== Release ==
The film was initially slated to release on 10 September but was postponed due to COVID-19 pandemic. Then it was scheduled to be released on 29 October 2021, but again got cancelled due to the death of Shiva Rajkumar's brother Puneeth Rajkumar.

== Reception ==
Bhajarangi 2 received mixed to positive reviews from critics.

Kiran R. Hemmige of The News Minute gave 2 out of 5 stars and wrote "While Shiva Rajkumar has given it his all as usual, the film lacks logic and is let down by its one-dimensional characters."

Jagadish Angadi of Deccan Herald gave 3 out of 5 stars and wrote, "The narrative technique in the flashback is likely to confuse the audience. The director appears to have lost control over the plot throughout the first half. Several scenes delay the story from taking off. In the second half, the pace falters."

== Music ==
Arjun Janya composed the music for the film. The soundtrack was released by Anand Audio.

Bhajarangi 2

Soundtrack album by Arjun Janya
- Released: October 26, 2021
- Recorded: 2020–2021
- Length: 21:56
- Language: Kannada
- Label: Anand Audio
- Producer: Arjun Janya

Arjun Janya chronology
Kotigobba 3 (2021)	Bhajarangi 2 (2021)	Ek Love Ya (2022)

No.	Title	Lyrics	Singer(s)	Length
1.	"Bhajare Bhajare Bhajarangi"	V. Nagendra Prasad	Shankar Mahadevan, Arjun Janya	3:36
2.	"Nee Sigoovaregu"	K.Kalyan	Sid Sriram	3:21
3.	"Re Re Bhajarangi"	K.Kalyan	Kailash Kher	3:49
4.	"Vaidyo Narayano Hari"	V. Nagendra Prasad	Vijay Prakash	3:48
Total length:				13.54
