= Nayakan (soundtrack) =

Tamil-language film soundtrack

Soundtrack album by Ilaiyaraaja
- Released: 1987
- Genre: Film soundtrack
- Length: 23:37
- Language: Tamil
- Label: Echo
- Producer: Ilaiyaraaja

Nayakan is the soundtrack to the 1987 Tamil-language epic crime drama film of the same name directed by Mani Ratnam, starring Kamal Haasan. The film's musical score is composed by Ilaiyaraaja, whose soundtrack features five songs under the lyrics of Pulamaipithan and Ilaiyaraaja himself. The soundtrack, which was released under the Echo label, became popular after the film's release.

== Development ==
Nayakan is Ilaiyaraaja's sixth collaboration with Mani Ratnam—following Pallavi Anu Pallavi (1983), Unaroo (1984), Pagal Nilavu, Idaya Kovil (both 1985) and Mouna Ragam (1986)—and also his 400th as a composer. Pulamaipithan was hired as the main lyricist, and contributed to all the songs except for "Nila Adhu Vanathumele", which Ilaiyaraaja himself wrote. The songs "Andhi Mazhai Megam" and "Nila Adhu Vanathumele" were set in the Carnatic Natabhairavi and Keeravani ragas, while "Nee Oru Kaadhal Sangeetham" is in the Hindustani raga Desh. The song is featured on both sides of the original LP record as the second track. For the song "Naan Sirithal Deepavali", Ilaiyaraaja collaborated with K. Jamuna Rani and M. S. Rajeswari, who were popular singers in the 1960s, to emulate the music of that era.

The theme song "Thenpandi Cheemayile" plays for most of the film; during the introduction titles, it has the colloquial line "yaar adichaaro" (sung by Ilaiyaraaja), but when it plays later in the film, the line is altered to the more polished "yaar adithaaro" (sung by Haasan). Film critic Baradwaj Rangan asked Ratnam whether this change was an indication to the eventual refinement of Velu. Ratnam said that Ilaiyaraaja's portions were recorded first, and that when they went for recording, they had this rustic version which lacked background music, and was of folk quality. Because the song was going to be repeated throughout the film, they also wanted a more orchestral version, and in this version sung by Haasan, the language became more sophisticated. Though Ratnam liked the original tune Ilaiyaraaja created for "Thenpandi Cheemayile", he felt it did not suit the song's narrative; the original tune was then used for "Nila Adhu Vanathumele".

During the production of this film, Ratnam simultaneously worked Agni Natchathiram (1988) as did Ilaiyaraaja. He recorded string instruments and orchestra for Nayakan during morning hours, and recorded electronic instruments for Agni Natchathiram, as the film featured synth-pop music.

== Track listing ==
No.	Title	Lyrics	Singer(s)	Length
1.	"Naan Sirithal Deepavali"	Pulamaipithan	K. Jamuna Rani, M. S. Rajeswari	4:46
2.	"Nila Adhu Vanathumele"	Ilaiyaraaja	Ilaiyaraaja	5:01
3.	"Andhi Mazhai Megam"	Pulamaipithan	T. L. Maharajan, P. Susheela	4:46
4.	"Nee Oru Kadhal Sangeetham"	Pulamaipithan	Mano, K. S. Chithra	4:32
5.	"Thenpandi Cheemayile"	Pulamaipithan	Ilaiyaraaja, Kamal Haasan	4:32
Total length:				23:37

== Reception and legacy ==
Ilaiyaraaja's music was acclaimed by critics for using the periodic instruments set in tune with the storyline. Writing for India Today, Madhu Jain wrote that "Illayaraaja's innovative music balances the film's obvious excesses". The News Minute-based critic Ananda Kumar R. S. called Nayagan as "one of his [Ilayaraaja's] best works".

All the songs in the film attained popularity, post-release, especially the song "Thenpandi Cheemayile" which had been referenced and parodied by several filmmakers in Tamil, becoming an integral part in the pop-culture. "Nila Adhu" was remixed by D. Imman for the film Ninaivil Nindraval (2014). During the Rock with Raaja concert in March 2022, Dhanush re-created the tune of "Nila Adhu Vanathumele" as a lullaby, altering the lyrics and performed it on stage, dedicating it to his sons Yatra and Linga.
