= Ashok Roy =

- Born: 1936; Dehradun
- Died: 2007
- Instrument: Sarod

Ashok Roy (1936–2007) was an Indian born musician based in Australia. Described as a "world class performer and inspiring teacher" Roy played the sarod. His solo album The Night Ragas was nominated at the ARIA Music Awards of 1997 for Best World Music Album.

Roy was the head of music department at The Doon School, an independent all-boys' school in Dehradun from 1977 till 1988.

== Discography ==
=== Albums ===
Title	Details	Peak positions
Title	Details	AUS
Master of the Sarod	Released: 1994; Label: Larrikin Records (LRF 333); Formats: CD	—
The Night Ragas	Released: 1996; Label: Larrikin (LRF 450); Formats: CD	—

== Awards and nominations ==
=== ARIA Music Awards ===
The ARIA Music Awards is an annual awards ceremony that recognises excellence, innovation, and achievement across all genres of Australian music. They commenced in 1987.

Year	Nominee / work	Award	Result	Ref.
1997	The Night Ragas	Best World Music Album	Nominated	
