= Navarasan =

Indian Kannada film director and actor (born 1985)

- Born: 3 January 1985 (age 41)
- Occupations: director; Actor; Screenwriter; Producer
- Years active: 2014–present
- Known for: Damayanthi
- Spouse: Krishna Priya (m. 2024)

Navarasan (born 3 January 1985) is an Indian Kannada film director, actor, producer and screenwriter. He is best known for the 2019 film Damayanthi.

== Career ==
Navarasan is mainly known for his works in horror and thriller movies. He was trained for action and direction at Koothupattarai Institute in Chennai.

In the year 2014, Navarasan made his debut as an actor in a Tamil movie Nee En Uyire directed by Vikas Lathiraj.

His work in the Kannada film industry began as both producer and actor in a horror movie Raakshasi (remake of Pisaasu), which was released in the year 2015. Navasaran played a lead role in this film along with Sindhu Lokanath.

While he gained experience in various departments of the film industry he decided to test his direction skills with the film Vaira. The good feedback he received for Vaira gave him the confidence to come up with the big budget film Damayanthi. The movie was released in many languages including: Kannada, Malayalam, Tamil and Hindi as Damayanthi and Samharini in Telugu. Kannada actress Radhika Kumaraswamy acted as a lead in this film. Damayanthi gave Navarasan his big break in the Indian film industry as a director.

== Filmography ==
Year	Title	Credited as			Role	Language	Ref.
Year	Title	Director	Producer	Actor	Role	Language	Ref.
2014	Nee En Uyire	No	No	Yes	Navarasan	Tamil	
2015	Raakshasi	No	Yes	Yes	Siddharth	Kannada	
2017	Vaira	Yes	No	Yes	Raj	Kannada	
2017	Psycho Shankra	No	No	Yes	Psycho Shankar	Kannada	
2018	Aa Karaala Ratri	No	Distributor	Yes	Kannappa	Kannada	
2019	Damayanthi	Yes	No	No	—N/a	Kannada	
