= Vidéothèque =

Virtual or physical library of videos

A vidéothèque is a virtual or physical library of videos. The concept originated as installations in museums or art galleries, but has been extended to video libraries on websites and physical fixed libraries and mobile libraries. Noted examples include those at ARTCENA, fr:Centre national du théâtre, Paris, Minpaku, Osaka and Ars Electronica in Linz.
