= Bhajarangi =

2013 Kannada film directed by Harsha

- Theatrical Poster
- Directed by: A. Harsha
- Screenplay by: Nanda Kishore; Shakthi; A. Harsha
- Story by: A. Harsha
- Produced by: R. Nataraj Gowda; M. Manjunath Gowda
- Starring: Shiva Rajkumar; Aindrita Ray; Madhu Guruswamy
- Cinematography: Swamy J. Gowda
- Edited by: Deepu S. Kumar
- Music by: Arjun Janya
- Production company: Film Entertainers Path
- Release date: 12 December 2013
- Running time: 172 minutes
- Country: India
- Language: Kannada
- Box office: ₹12.5 crore

Bhajarangi is a 2013 Indian Kannada-language fantasy action film directed by A. Harsha, who co-wrote the script with Nanda Kishore and Shakthi. The film stars Shiva Rajkumar, Aindrita Ray, Madhu Guruswamy, Rukmini Vijayakumar and Saurav Lokesh. The music was composed by Arjun Janya, while cinematography and editing were handled by Swamy. J. Gowda and Deepu. S. Kumar

Bhajarangi was released on 12 December 2013 to positive reviews from critics and became a box office success. A sequel titled Bhajarangi 2 was released on 29 October 2021.

== Plot ==
Jeeva, a youngster going through a constant phase of bad luck, meets a priest, who tells him to arrive at a village Ramadurga to know about his "Janma Rahasya" (transl. Birth Secret). Jeeva initially does not care about the priest's advice, but learns from his grandfather that his father was an orphan. Jeeva travels to Ramadurga to meet the priest and is accompanied by his uncle and Geetha. Jeeva arrives at the village and gets involved in a fight with goons working for Tantrik, who terrorizes the villagers due to some purpose.

Jeeva saves the villagers by defeating Tantrik's goons, where he meets the priest and learns that his biological grandfather is Bhajarangi, a messaiah who works to save the people from any trouble. Bhajarangi had battled the Tantrik and saved the villages from his harassment, but the Tantrik finished Bhajarangi by creating a demon Raktaksha in the form of a baby and made Bhajarangi believe that he is his son Raana. The real Raana was actually saved and given a villager (Jeeva's adopted grandfather) who adopts Raana as his own son.

Raktaksha started terrorizing the village and meets Krishne, a dancer and devotee of Lord Krishna. Raktaksha lusted after Krishne and wanted to sleep with her, but Krishne killed herself by setting herself on fire and cursed Raktaksha. Raktaksha died due to Krishne's curse. The Tantrik arrived to meet Raktaksha and asks for a dagger, but Raktaksha told the Tantrik to bring Krishne. After learning this, Jeeva initially decides to leave, but is encouraged by Geetha to fight the Tantrik.

While performing a pooja, the priest gets shocked about Geetha's horoscope and tells Jeeva that Geetha's horoscope matches with Krishne, indicating that Geetha is in danger. The Tantrik's goons kidnap Geetha and take her to the Tantrik. The Tantrik confronts Raktaksha's spirit and finds the dagger, but the Tantrik finishes Raktaksha's spirit. Jeeva arrives at the Tantrik's hideout and their fight leads them to the village. A tough battle ensues, where Jeeva defeats and kills the Tantrik, thus saving the village and avenging Bhajarangi's death.

== Cast ==
- Shiva Rajkumar as (dual role)
  - Bhajarangi
  - Jeeva; Bhajarangi's Grandson; Geetha's husband
- Aindrita Ray as Geetha; Jeeva's wife
- Rukmini Vijayakumar as Krishne (voice-over by Harini Shrikanth)
- Madhu Guruswamy as Tantrik /Mantravadhi
- Saurav Lokesh as Raana/Raktaksha; Bhajarangi's foster son
- Bullet Prakash as James Bond
- Tabla Nani as Jeeva's uncle
- Girija Lokesh as Jeeva's mother
- K. S. Sridhar as the priest
- Sadhu Kokila
- Rani Damukumar
- Jyothi Murur
- Harini Shrikanth
- Venkatesh Prasad
- Mahesh
- Shivaram
- Michael Madhu
- Chethan
- Vidya Rao
- Vijayanand
- Bhajarangi Mohan
- Vaijanath Biradar
- Shruthi R
- Honnavalli Krishna
- Tumkur Mohan
- Laya Kokila
- Kaddipudi Chandru

=== Cameo appearances ===
The film's introduction song "Bossu Nam Bossu" features special appearances.

- Vijay Raghavendra
- Sriimurali
- Aditya
- Srinagar Kitty
- Yogesh
- Sathish Ninasam
- Arjun Janya
- R. Nataraaj Gowda

== Production ==
Shiva Rajkumar had to lose weight for the film and prepared for a six-pack abs at the age of 51. Most of the film was shot near Hesarghatta, which is northwest of Bangalore.

The official trailer was launched in Triveni theatre at Bangalore in September 2013, which was attended by Yash. The introduction song, featuring six leading actors of Kannada cinema, was shot at Minerva Mills in Bangalore.

== Release ==
Nataraj Gowda and Manjunath Gowda, who are the producers of the film, joined hands with PVR Cinemas for the film's domestic release. The film was released simultaneously on 12 December 2013 in Karnataka, Maharashtra, Andhra Pradesh and Tamil Nadu in multiple theaters. The producers have reportedly booked more than 221 cinema halls across Karnataka.

== Soundtrack ==
The soundtrack was composed by Arjun Janya.

Bhajarangi

Soundtrack album by Arjun Janya
- Released: 30 November 2013
- Recorded: 2013
- Genre: Feature film soundtrack
- Length: 21:11
- Language: Kannada
- Producer: Arjun Janya

Official audio
- Bhajarangi - Full Album on YouTube

Track listing
| No. | Title | Lyrics | Singer(s) | Length |
|---|---|---|---|---|
| 1. | "Bossu Nam Bossu" | Chethan, Chandan, Mohan | Arjun Janya | 3:49 |
| 2. | "Jai Bhajarangi" | V. Nagendra Prasad | Shankar Mahadevan | 4:30 |
| 3. | "Jiya Teri Jiya Meri" | Jayanth Kaikini | Karthik | 3:59 |
| 4. | "Re Re Bhajarangi" | K. Kalyan | Kailash Kher | 5:39 |
| 5. | "Sri Krishna" | V. Nagendra Prasad | Anuradha Bhat | 4:34 |
| Total length: | | | | 21:11 |

== Reception ==
=== Critical response ===
The Times of India gave 4/5 stars and wrote "Full marks to director A Harsha for handling a strong story that focuses on a clash between good and evil. Though the movie is a bit lengthy, the sequences that follow one after the other keep you on the edge of your seat." Sify termed the film as a "must watch" and wrote "Harsha has definitely made his mark as a director and he is here to stay for a very long time". Deccan Chronicle wrote "A must-watch for Shivarajkumar fans and all those who love to escape reality, at least for few hours." Shyam Prasad. S from Bangalore Mirror wrote "Bhajarangi is one of Shiva Rajkumar's best films in recent times".

== Sequel ==
A sequel titled Bhajarangi 2 was released on 29 October 2021. Shiva Rajkumar and Bhavana play the lead roles, with A. Harsha directing the film.
