= A. Harsha =

Indian filmmaker (born 1980)

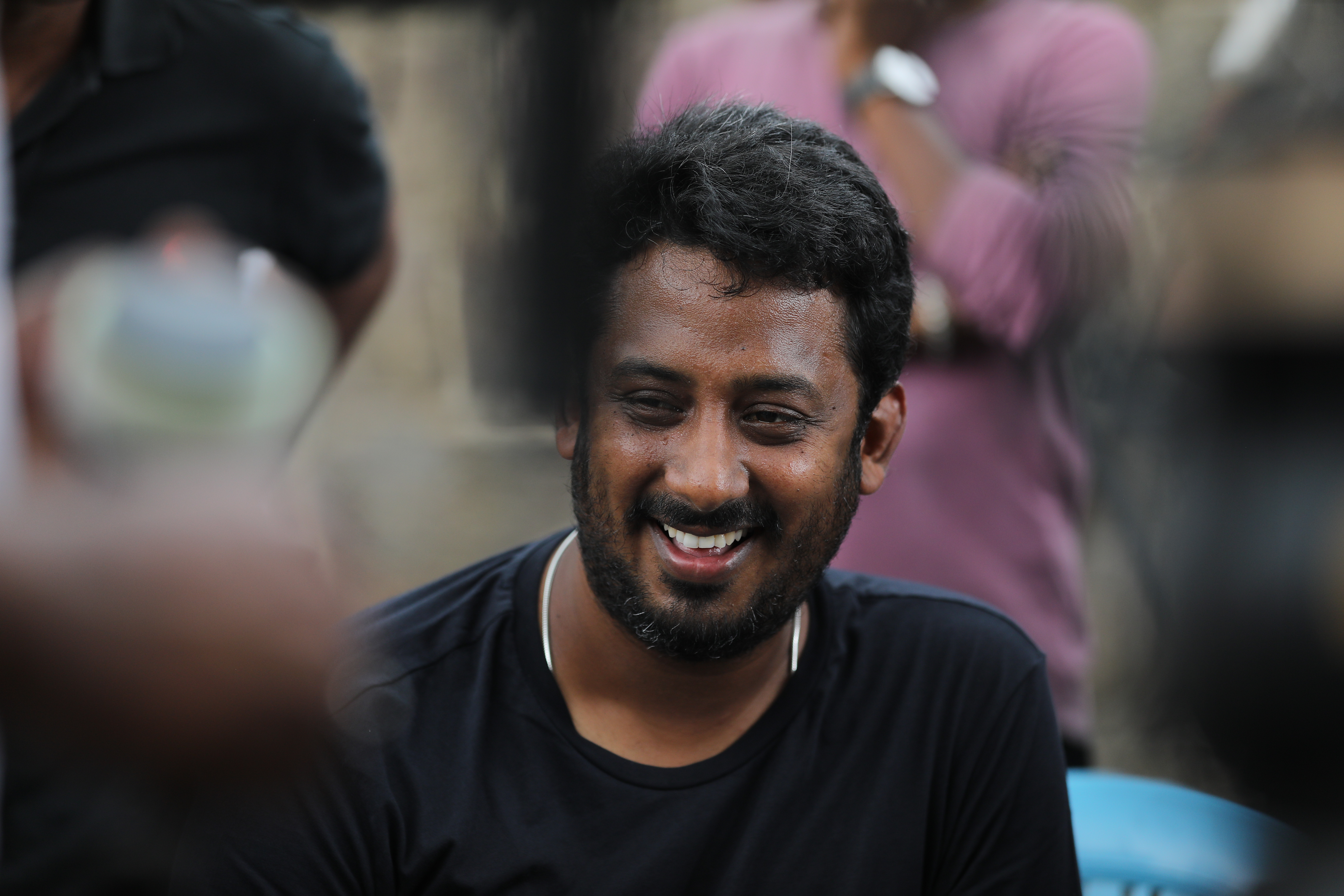
- Born: 24 August 1980 (age 46); Bengaluru, Karnataka, India
- Occupations: Choreographer, film director, actor
- Years active: 2000–present

A. Harsha (born 24 August 1980) is a choreographer turned film director, who works primarily in Kannada cinema in both capacities. His directorial works include Bhajarangi (2013), Vajrakaya (2015), Anjani Putra (2017), Bhajarangi 2 (2021), and Vedha (2022). He made his Telugu cinema debut with Bhimaa (2024) and his Hindi cinema debut with Baaghi 4 (2025).

== Career ==
Harsha entered movie industry as an actor when he acted in movie Kashi from Village, as the brother of Sudeep and has since completed 300 dance sequences as choreographer. Harsha managed the entire event and choreographed the audio launch function of Nikhil Kumar's debut film, Jaguar.

=== Choreographer ===
Harsha debuted in KFI as a choreographer for the movie Ranga S.S.L.C in 2004. Harsha earned a lot of recognition when he choreographed the songs for Mungaaru Male. He has since choreographed for many popular movies, including Meravanige and Moggina Manasu, Rishi, Taj Mahal, Only Vishnuvardhana.

=== Director ===
Harsha made his directorial debut with Geleya in 2007, starring Prajwal Devraj and Tarun. involving the underworld. Harsha was appreciated for the freshness of the film, its making and was average at Box Office. Harsha took up direction again with Birugaali in 2009, this time including Chetan of Aa Dinagalu fame and casting his wife Sitara Vaidya. This movie opened to poor reviews despite melodious songs.

Harsha's 2012 film was Chingari starring Darshan was inspired from English movie Taken.

His 2013 film Bhajarangi featuring Shivarajkumar was a success at the box-office. He followed it up with similar script and same cast in Vajrakaya, which released in 2015 and was an average hit.

Released in 2016, Jai Maruthi 800 was panned by critics for following same storyline as Bhajarangi or Vajrakaya. As per Deccan Chronicle, "Anyone who has so far seen this director's previous 'commercial' hits Bhajarangi and Vajrakaya can easily predict what 'Jai Maruti 800' is all about. With no creative mind set, and banking heavily upon his narrative style from the previous 'commercially' successful films and off course leaving it to his favourite God - the ingredients remains the same but packed with a new label - comedy."

Harsha followed with two remakes Anjani Putra, which received mixed reviews even with Puneet Rajkumar in lead, and Seetharama Kalyana, which was a flop.

In October 2017, Harsha announced Raana with Yash amidst much fanfare. But Yash was not too happy with the script that Harsha had presented to him. Sources add that when Harsha presented the actor with the complete script, he wasn't too happy and had reportedly told the director to fine-tune it to meet his approval standards. Further, with the director's track record not being up to scratch, Yash's well-wishers reportedly advised him to put Raana in cold storage for the time being. Harsha replaced Yash with Shiva Rajkumar in the movie and eventually, renamed the movie as Bhajarangi 2.

Harsha has also announced release of his fourth movie with Shiva Raj kumar, which will be a departure from his usual title references and storyline. This movie was Shiva Raj kumar's 125th movie and titled Vedha.

Harsha ventured into Telugu movie industry with Bhimaa, but the film bombed at the box office. As per Times of India, "the script soon succumbs to conventional tropes, including exaggerated heroism, a superficial romantic subplot, and cheesy dialogues". Review of his direction by Deccan Chronicle stated as "Kannada director Harsha, who is known for supernatural thrillers in Sandalwood, delivers a disappointing film. Trying to blend mystical elements with a cop story falls flat. It will be difficult for even Lord Shiva to help him score a hit in Telugu"

His next venture was into Bollywood for Baaghi 4 produced by Sajid Nadiadwala. The movie opened to poor 13.2 Cr opening and was widely criticized for being violent, weak direction and was rated A for the gore, with an abysmal IMDb score. As per MensXP, the direction was reviewed as "As for A. Harsha’s vision? Let’s just say it was scattered across the floor. The film desperately tries to borrow elements from hits like Animal but only manages to make them worse. TimesNow reviewed the movie as "A Harsha, known for his work in the Kannada film industry, refuses to break the stereotype that accompanies action movies. He plays with tried and tested formulas, leaving little to imagination."

== Filmography ==
=== As a director ===
Year	Film	Languages	
2007	Geleya	Kannada	
2009	Birugaali	Kannada	
2012	Chingaari	Kannada	Unofficial remake of English movie Taken
2013	Bhajarangi	Kannada	
2015	Vajrakaya	Kannada	
2016	Jai Maruthi 800	Kannada	
2017	Anjani Putra	Kannada	Remake of Tamil movie Poojai
2019	Seetharama Kalyana	Kannada	Unofficial remake of 2017 Telugu movie Rarandoi Veduka Chudham
2021	Bhajarangi 2	Kannada	
2022	Vedha	Kannada	
2024	Bhimaa	Telugu	
2025	Baaghi 4	Hindi	Unofficial remake of 2013 Tamil movie Ainthu Ainthu Ainthu

=== Partial choreography ===
- Ranga SSLC (2004)
- Rishi (2005)
- Mungaru Male (2006)
- Geleya (2007)
- Meravanige (2008)
- Moggina Manasu (2008)
- Taj Mahal (2008)
- Vishnuvardhana (2011)
- Bahaddur (2014)
- Bengal Tiger (2015)
- Hebbuli (2017)
- Bharjari (2017)
- Bagheera (2024)
- Toxic (2026)

=== As an actor ===
- Kashi from Village (2005)
- Jackpot (2006)

== Television ==
Year	Show	Role	Notes
2021	Dance Dance	Judge	
