= List of Kannada films of 1997 =

== Top-grossing films ==
Rank	Title	Collection	Ref.
1.	Amruthavarshini	₹12 crore (₹65.17 crore in 2025)	
2.	America! America!!	₹10 crore (₹54.32 crore in 2025)	
3.	Agni IPS	₹8 crore (₹43.44 crore in 2025)	
4.	O Mallige	₹7 crore (₹38.01 crore in 2025)	
5.	Simhada Mari	₹5 crore (₹27.15 crore in 2025)	

== Released films ==
The following is a list of films produced in the Kannada film industry in India in 1997, presented in alphabetical order.

Title	Director	Cast	Music
Agni IPS	Anand P. Raju	Sai Kumar, Ranjitha, B. Saroja Devi, Umashree	Rama Chakravarthy
Akka	Raj Kishore	Arun Pandian, Malashri, Pramod Chakravarthy, Keerthi Raj	V. Manohar
Aliya Alla Magala Ganda	Y. Yesudas	Jaggesh, Udaya Bhanu, Kalyan Kumar, Sundar Raj	Rajesh Ramanath
Ammavra Ganda	Phani Ramachandra	Shiva Rajkumar, Bhagyashree Patwardhan, Sithara, Suman Nagarkar, Balaraj	Raaj
America! America!!	Nagathihalli Chandrashekar	Ramesh Aravind, Akshay Anand, Hema Panchamukhi	Mano Murthy
Anna Andre Nammanna	J. Balaram	Jaggesh, Kusuma, Usha, Rockline Venkatesh	V. Manohar
Amruthavarshini	Dinesh Baboo	Ramesh Aravind, Suhasini Maniratnam, Sharath Babu, Tara, Nivedita Jain	Deva
April Fool	A. N. Jayaramaiah	Ambareesh, Ramkumar, Srikanya, Srikrupa, Girish Karnad	Guna Singh
Baalida Mane	G. K. Mudduraj	Ambareesh, Shashikumar, Nivedita Jain, Vinaya Prasad	Rajan–Nagendra
Baduku Jatakabandi	S. Umesh	Kashinath, Shwetha, Abhijeeth, Bank Janardhan	V. Manohar
Bhanda Alla Bahadur	H. Vasu	Jaggesh, Ananth Nag, Kalyan Kumar, Subhashri, Doddanna	V. Manohar
Bhoomi Geetha	Kesari Haravu	Lokesh, Vinaya Prasad, Atul Kulkarni	Ilaiyaraaja
CBI Durga	Om Prakash Rao	Malashri, Charanraj, Ashok	Sadhu Kokila
Central Jail	V. Vasu	Arun Pandian, Charanraj, Sai Kumar	Sadhu Kokila
Cheluva	V. Ravichandran	V. Ravichandran, Meena, Gautami, Tiger Prabhakar, Suman	Hamsalekha
Chikka	V. Umakanth	Kumar Govind, Shilpa, Shobhraj	V. Manohar
Choo Baana	Phani Ramachandra	Devaraj, Ravinder Mann, Swarna, Vajramuni	Rajan–Nagendra
Dhairya	H. S. Rajashekar	Sai Kumar, Jyothi, Dileep	Sadhu Kokila
Ee Hrudaya Ninagagi	Majji Krishna Prasad	Kumar Govind, Archana, Rasika, Lokesh	V. Manohar
Ellaranthalla Nanna Ganda	S. Umesh	Vishnuvardhan, Prema, Tara, B. C. Patil	Upendra Kumar
Enoondre	Relangi Narasimha Rao	Anil, Bhavya, Anjana, Dwarakish, Doddanna	Koti
Ganesha I Love You	Phani Ramachandra	Ananth Nag, Sithara, Ravinder Mann	Rajesh Ramanath
Ganga Yamuna	S. Mahendar	Shiva Rajkumar, Malashri, Ravinder Mann, Mukhyamantri Chandru	Vidyasagar
Hai Bangalore	Anand P. Raju	Shashikumar, Krishnam Raju, Arun Pandian, Bhavyashree Rai, Padma Vasanthi	Sadhu Kokila
Halliyadarenu Shiva	V. Umakanth	Kumar Govind, Charulatha, Ramesh Bhat	Hamsalekha
Honeymoon	S. R. Raju	Charanraj, Dolly Minhas, Pournami	Sarang
Jackie Chan	Thriller Manju	Suman, Thriller Manju, Arun Pandian, Sithara	Sadhu Kokila
Janani Janmabhoomi	H. R. Bhargava	Vishnuvardhan, Srikanya, B. Saroja Devi, Ramesh Bhat	Rajan–Nagendra
Jenina Hole	Peraala	Ramkumar, Sumanth, Udaya Bhanu, Geetha	Rajesh Ramanath
Jodi Hakki	D. Rajendra Babu	Shiva Rajkumar, Vijayalakshmi, Charulatha, Harish Rai	V. Manohar
Kalavida	V. Ravichandran	V. Ravichandran, Roja, Heera Rajagopal, Raghuvaran, Dolly Minhas	Hamsalekha
Kalla Banda Kalla	Y. Nanjundappa	Kumar Govind, Vinaya Prasad, Doddanna, Tennis Krishna, Girija Lokesh, Mukhyamantri Chandru	Guna Singh
Kalyani	S. Narayan	Charanraj, Shilpa, Kumar Govind	K. Kalyan
Kandalli Gundu	J. Bhavale	Abhijeeth, Nagesh Mayya, Tara, Vanitha Vasu, Venki	Dhina
Kodagina Kaveri	S. Mahendar	Ramkumar, Shruti, Lokesh, Master Anand, Tennis Krishna	Hamsalekha
Laali	Dinesh Babu	Vishnuvardhan, Mohini, Vinaya Prasad, Harish	V. Manohar
Lady Commissioner	Naganna	Arun Pandian, Malashri, Srividya, Kota Srinivasa Rao	Hamsalekha
Lakshmi Mahalakshmi	Yogish Hunsur	Shashikumar, Shilpa, Shwetha	Hamsalekha
Maduve	V. Umakanth	Ramesh Aravind, Charulatha, Lakshmi, Kumar Govind	S. A. Rajkumar
Mahabharatha	S. Narayan	Vinod Raj, Charanraj, Chaithali, Darshan	K. Kalyan
Manava 2022	C. Vasu	Devaraj, Vijay Adhiraj, Vineetha, Suman Nagarkar	Nanda
Mangala Suthra	C. H. Balaji Singh Babu	Vishnuvardhan, Vinaya Prasad, Priya Raman, Jai Jagadish	Vidyasagar
Mavana Magalu	G. K. Mudduraj	Shashikumar, Subhashri, Shwetha, Lokesh	V. Manohar
Mommaga	V. Ravichandran	V. Ravichandran, Meena, Prakash Rai, Umashri	Hamsalekha
Muddina Kanmani	Ravi Kottarakara	Shiva Rajkumar, Sai Kumar, Suchitra, Shilpa	S. P. Venkatesh
Mungarina Minchu	Rajendra Singh Babu	Ramesh Aravind, Suman Nagarkar, Shilpa	V. Manohar
Nagamandala	T. S. Nagabharana	Prakash Raj, Vijayalakshmi, B. Jayashree, Vanitha Vasu, Mandya Ramesh	C. Ashwath
Nagarika	Y. Nanjundappa	Krishne Gowda, G. V. Sharadha, Shankar Bhat, Master Anand	Sadguna Raj
Nee Mudida Mallige	Kodlu Ramakrishna	Ramkumar, Kumar Govind, Nivedita Jain, Bhavana	Sadhu Kokila
Nodu Baa Nammoora	Nanjunde Gowda	Kumar Govind, Shwetha, Doddanna, Mukhyamantri Chandru	V. Manohar
O Mallige	V. Manohar	Ramesh Aravind, Charulatha, Amar Mayur, Chaithali	V. Manohar
Police Bete	G. K. Mudduraj	Sai Kumar, Sithara, Rajashree, Ashok	Sadhu Kokila
Prema Geethe	Srikanth Nahata	Ambareesh, Jaya Prada, Yamuna, K. S. Ashwath	Hamsalekha
Prema Raga Haadu Gelathi	Sunil Kumar Desai	Shiva Rajkumar, Ramesh Aravind, Nivedita Jain, Srinath	Ilaiyaraaja
Raaja	Relangi Narasimha Rao	Shiva Rajkumar, Neena, Abhijeeth	Deva
Ranganna	H. Vasu	Jaggesh, Vijayalakshmi, Srinath	Rajesh Ramanath
Rangena Halliyage Rangada Rangegowda	V. Umakanth	Ambareesh, Ramesh Aravind, Ashwini Bhave, Bhavyashree Rai	V. Manohar
Rough and Tough	H. S. Rajashekar	Vinod Alva, Thriller Manju, Madhubala, Thyagarajan, Devan	Sadhu Kokila
Sangliyana Part 3	Ravindranath	Devaraj, Sithara, Srikanya, Ramesh Bhat, Shobaraj	Vaidi - Krishna
Shivaranjani	H. S. Rajashekar	Raghavendra Rajkumar, Nivedita Jain, Dheerendra Gopal, C. R. Simha	Hamsalekha
Shreemathi	Hariprasad	Sridhar, Madhavi, Janaki	Raj
Shruthi Haakida Hejje	Dwarakish	Kumar Govind, Shruti, Dwarakish, Vishnuvardhan, Manya	Ramani Bharadwaj
Simhada Mari	Om Prakash Rao	Shiva Rajkumar, Simran, Ambika, Krishnam Raju	Hamsalekha
Thaayi Saheba	Girish Kasaravalli	Jayamala, Suresh Heblikar	C. Ashwath
Thavarina Theru	G. K. Mudduraj	Sridhar, Shruti, Doddanna	Rajesh Ramanath
Thayavva	V. Umakanth	Charanraj, Sudeep, Sindhu, Umashree	V. Manohar
Thayi Kotta Seere	S. Narayan	Kumar Govind, Shruti, Doddanna	K. Kalyan
Ulta Palta	N. S. Shankar	Ramesh Aravind, Sanketh Kashi, Sushma Veer, Pavitra Lokesh, Pooja Lokesh	V. Manohar
Vimochane	T. S. Nagabharana	Jayanthi, Vijayalakshmi, Sundar Raj	L. Vaidyanathan
Yuddha	K. V. Raju	Devaraj, Charanraj, Pooja Lokesh, Aahana	V. Manohar
Yuva Shakti	Joe Simon	Arun Pandian, Bob Anthony, Anjum Sait, Mansoor Ali Khan, Vinaya Prasad	Sadhu Kokila
Zindabad	Anand P. Raju	Suman, Malashri, Geetha, Shobhraj	V. Manohar

== See also ==
- Kannada films of 1996
- Kannada films of 1998
