= List of Kannada films of 1999 =

The following is a list of films produced in the Kannada film industry in India in 1999, presented in alphabetical order.

== Highest grossing films ==
Rank	Title	Collection	Ref.
1.	AK47	₹17 crore (₹81.6 crore in 2025)	
2.	Suryavamsha	₹16 crore (₹76.8 crore in 2025)	
3.	Upendra	₹15 crore(₹72 crore in 2025)	
4.	Habba	₹12 crore (₹57.6 crore in 2025)	
5.	Veerappa Nayaka	₹10 crore(₹48 crore in 2025)	
6.	Chandramukhi Pranasakhi	₹9 crore(₹43.2 crore in 2025)	
7.	Hrudaya Hrudaya	₹7 crore(₹33.6 crore in 2025)	
8.	Sambhrama	₹6 crore(₹28.8 crore in 2025)	
9.	Naanu Nanna Hendthiru	₹5 crore(₹24 crore in 2025)	
10.	Snehaloka	₹3 crore ( ₹14.4 crore in 2025)	

== Released films ==
Title	Director	Cast	Music
Aahaa	Anand P. Raju	Ramkumar, Chandana, C. R. Simha, Doddanna	Rajesh Ramanath
Aaha Nanna Maduveyanthe	Om Sai Prakash	Jaggesh, Charulatha, Sadhu Kokila, Doddanna	V. Manohar
Aryabhata	K. S. Ramanath	Ramesh Aravind, Soundarya, Devaraj, Rangayana Raghu, Avinash	V. Manohar
AK-47	Om Prakash Rao	Shiva Rajkumar, Chandini, Om Puri, Girish Karnad, Ashish Vidyarthi, Srividya, Sadhu Kokila	Hamsalekha
Arunodaya	P. H. Vishwanath	Ramesh Aravind, Vijayalakshmi, Shilpa	Hamsalekha
Avale Nanna Hudugi	S Umesh	Charulatha, Sadhu Kokila, Harsha Darbar, Bank Janardhan	Sadhu Kokila, Sunil Dev
Bombaat Halwa	Bangi Ranga	Sadhu Kokila, Madhura, Doddanna	Sadhu Kokila
Chaitrada Chiguru	K. Shivarudraiah	Kumar Bangarappa, Kaveri, Nikhil, Chaithra	V. Manohar
Chandramuki Pranasakhi	Seetharam Karanth	Ramesh Aravind, Prema, Bhavana, Srinivasa Murthy	K. Kalyan
Chandrodaya	S. Mahendar	Shiva Rajkumar, Ramesh Aravind, Prema	Hamsalekha
Channappa Channegowda	Anand P. Raju	B. C. Patil, Ruchita Prasad, Sadhu Kokila, Gurukiran	Hamsalekha
Chora Chittha Chora	Subhramanya	V. Ravichandran, Namrata Shirodkar, Malavika, Srinivasa Murthy	V. Ravichandran
Coolie Raja	A. R. Babu	Shashikumar, Indraja, Sindhu, Lokesh	Hamsalekha
Dalawayi	Shivamani	B. C. Patil, Vijayalakshmi, Vinod Raj, K. S. Ashwath	Hamsalekha
Dava Dava	K. N. Udayashankar	Rajkamal	Vijayashekar
Deveeri	Kavita Lankesh	Nandita Das, Bhavana, Sanketh Kashi, B. Jayashree	C. Ashwath
Drona	H. Vasu	Jaggesh, Monica Bedi, Komal Kumar, Reshma, Avinash	Hamsalekha
Durga Shakti	Surya	Devaraj, Shruti, Tara, Charuhasan	Rajesh Ramanath
Garuda	H. S. Rajashekar	Devaraj, Shobaraj, Madhura, Madan Mallu	Rajesh Ramanath
Habba	D. Rajendra Babu	Vishnuvardhan, Ambareesh, Devaraj, Shashikumar, Ramkumar, Jaya Prada, Kasthuri, Urvashi, Charulatha, Vijayalakshmi	Hamsalekha
Hrudaya Hrudaya	M. S. Rajashekar	Shiva Rajkumar, Ramesh Aravind, Anu Prabhakar, Avinash, Sharath Babu	Hamsalekha
Idhu Entha Premavayya	Kodlu Ramakrishna	Ramesh Aravind, Shilpa, Charulatha, Jai Jagadish	Gurukiran
Janumadatha	T. S. Nagabharana	Shiva Rajkumar, Anju Aravind, Sharat Babu, Girish Karnad, Ambika	V. Manohar
Jayasoorya	Rama Narayanan	Napoleon, Nagma, S. P. Balasubrahmanyam, Rami Reddy	RRG
Khalanayaka	A. R. Babu	Tiger Prabhakar, Shashikumar, Ravali, Swarna	Hamsalekha
Kanooru Heggadithi	Girish Karnad	Tara, Shivram Prabhu, Girish Karnad	B. V. Karanth
Kubera	Shivamani	Jaggesh, Ravali, Doddanna, Hema Chowdhary	Rajesh Ramanath
Maha Edabidangi	K. S. L. Swamy	S. P. Balasubrahmanyam, Khushbu, S. P. B. Charan, H. G. Dattatreya, Sindhu	Vijaya Bhaskar
Meese Hottha Gandasige Demandappo Demandu	Kashinath	Kashinath, Madhura, Tennis Krishna	Hamsalekha
Mr. Kokila	M. R.	Kamalesh Soni, Shalu Saini, Amritha Sabarwal, Jayanthi	Iyer Selvam
Mr. X	H. S. Rajashekar	Devaraj, Iqbal Khan, Charulatha	Sadhu Kokila
Naanenu Madlilla	Dinesh Babu	Ananth Nag, Sudharani, Shilpa, Shivaram	K. Kalyan
Nannaseya Hoove	E. Channagangappa	Jaggesh, Monica Bedi, Jayanthi, Doddanna	Hamsalekha
Naanu Nanna Hendthiru	V. S. Reddy	V. Ravichandran, Soundarya, Prema, Doddanna	V. Ravichandran
O Premave	Naganna	V. Ravichandran, Rambha, Srinivasa Murthy, Doddanna	V. Ravichandran
Om Namah Shivaya	Thriller Manju	Saikumar, Rukmini, Abhijeeth, Shobaraj	Sadhu Kokila
Patela	Victory Vasu	Jaggesh, Payal Malhotra, Lokesh, Avinash, Tennis Krishna	Hamsalekha
Pratibhatane	Rajendra Kumar Arya	K. Shivram, Vijayalakshmi, Kanchana	V. Manohar
Prathyartha	Sunil Kumar Desai	Ramesh Aravind, Sudeepa, Raghuvaran, Girish Karnad, Vidyashree	Ilaiyaraaja
Prema Prema Prema	Siddalingaiah	Suresh Raj, Sindhu Menon, Ramya, H. G. Dattatreya	Rajan–Nagendra
Premachari	S. Mahendar	B. C. Patil, Shilpa, Lokanath	Hamsalekha
Premotsava	Dinesh Babu	Vishnuvardhan, Devayani, Roja	Praveen Dutt
Rambhe Urvashi Menake	Arjun	Kashinath, Akhila, Madhura, Nisha, Bank Janardhan	Hamsalekha
Ravimama	S. Narayan	V. Ravichandran, Nagma, Hema Prabhath, Doddanna	L. N. Shastry
Sambhrama	Mahesh Sukhadhare	Ramesh Aravind, Kaveri, Hema Prabhath, Vanishree	Hamsalekha
Sneha	V. S. Reddy	V. Ravichandran, Ramya Krishnan, Raasi, Karan	V. Ravichandran
Snehaloka	S. Mahendar	Ramesh Aravind, Anu Prabhakar, Ramkumar, Shashikumar, Vinod Raj, Charanraj	Hamsalekha
Surya Vamsha	S. Narayan	Vishnuvardhan, Isha Koppikar, Lakshmi, Vijayalakshmi, Mukhyamantri Chandru, Doddanna	V. Manohar
Swasthik	Upendra	Raghavendra Rajkumar, Vijayalakshmi	V. Manohar
The Killer	Anand P. Raju	Suman, Prakash Rai, Arun Pandian, Indraja, Archana	Sadhu Kokila
Tuvvi Tuvvi Tuvvi	Singeetham Srinivasa Rao	Raghavendra Rajkumar, Charulatha, Doddanna	Hamsalekha
Tharikere Erimele	Raj Kishore	Sadhu Kokila, Archana, Prakash Rai, Tara, Devaraj	Vijay Anand
Underworld	K. Madhu	Sai Kumar, Charulatha, Abhijeeth, Umashri	V. Manohar
Upendra	Upendra	Upendra, Raveena Tandon, Prema, Damini, Arun Govil, Gurukiran, V. Manohar	Gurukiran
Veerappa Nayaka	S. Narayan	Vishnuvardhan, Shruthi, Sudheer, Mukhyamantri Chandru	Rajesh Ramanath
Vishwa	Shivamani	Shiva Rajkumar, Suchitra Krishnamurthy, Ananth Nag, Suhasini	Hamsalekha
Z	Praveen Naik	Prakash Raj, Prema, Ritu Shivpuri, Tennis Krishna	V. Manohar, Sadhu Kokila, Rajesh Ramanath, Murali Mohan, Praveen D. Rao

== See also ==
- Kannada films of 1998
- Kannada films of 2000
