= List of Kannada films of 1998 =

== Top-grossing films ==
| Rank | Title | Collection | Ref. |
|---|---|---|---|
| 1. | A | ₹18 crore (₹89.7 crore in 2025) | |
| 2. | Andaman | ₹10 crore (₹50.63 crore in 2025) | |
| 3. | Hoomale | ₹8 crore (₹40.54 crore in 2025) | |
| 4. | Yaare Neenu Cheluve | ₹6 crore (₹30.37 crore in 2025) | |
| 5. | Bhoomi Thayiya Chochchala Maga | ₹3 crore (₹15.39 crore in 2025) | |

== List of released films ==
The following is a list of films produced in the Kannada film industry in India in 1998, presented in alphabetical order.

| Title | Director | Cast | Music |
|---|---|---|---|
| A | Upendra | Upendra, Chandini, Archana, Marina | Gurukiran |
| Agni Sakshi | Shivamani | Devaraj, Malashri, Shwetha, Doddanna | Sadhu Kokila |
| Amar Akbar Anthony | Saagar | Arun Pandian, Thriller Manju, Vinod Alva, Sri Durga, Reshma | Rajesh Ramanath |
| Andaman | P. H. Vishwanath | Shiva Rajkumar, Baby Nivedita, Sumanth, Soni, Vinaya Prasad | Hamsalekha |
| Anthargami | A. Balakrishna | Ramesh Aravind, Charulatha, Siddharth, Tara | Rajesh Ramnath |
| Arjun Abhimanyu | Prabhakar | Jaggesh, Tiger Prabhakar, Payal Malhotra, Srikanya, Avinash | Rajan–Nagendra |
| Avala Charithre | Vemgal Jagannath Rao | Ramesh Aravind, Rajashankar, Abhinaya, Shyam Sundar | Vijaya Bhaskar |
| Baaro Nanna Muddina Krishna | Prakash | Shashikumar, Anusha, Doddanna, Umashri, B. V. Radha | Rajesh Ramnath |
| Bayalu Deepa | D. A. Upadhya | Sridhar, Sithara, Bank Janardhan | Rajan–Nagendra |
| Bhama Satyabhama | S. Narayan | S. Narayan, Shruti, Doddanna | Rajesh Ramnath |
| Bhoomi Thayiya Chochchala Maga | Rajendra Singh Babu | Shiva Rajkumar, Ramesh Aravind, Shilpa, Vijayalakshmi | V. Manohar |
| Bisi Raktha | Shivakumar | Prakash Raj, Sithara, Shilpa | Sadhu Kokila |
| Chor Guru Chandaal Shishya | A. R. Babu | Kashinath, Dheerendra Gopal, Charan Raj, Charulatha | Sadhu Kokila |
| Daayadi | S. Umesh | Devaraj, Charan Raj, Vajramuni, Vinaya Prasad, Swarna | Hamsalekha |
| Doni Sagali | Rajendra Singh Babu | Shashikumar, Soundarya, Suman Nagarkar, Shankar Ashwath | V. Manohar |
| Gadibidi Krishna | Om Sai Prakash | Shiva Rajkumar, Ravali, Indraja, Charulatha, Tara | Hamsalekha |
| Goonda Mathu Police | Vasu | Malashri, Bhanuchander, Doddanna, Avinash | Sadhu Kokila |
| Hello Yama | A. R. Babu | Kashinath, Doddanna, Sadhu Kokila, Rinki, Monisha, Lavanya | Sadhu Kokila |
| Hendithghelthini | Dinesh Babu | Vishnuvardhan, Suhasini, Tara, Ramakrishna | V. Manohar |
| Hoomale | Nagathihalli Chandrashekar | Ramesh Aravind, Suman Nagarkar, Sanketh Kashi, Baby Hima | Ilaiyaraaja |
| Hrudayanjali | Bhaskar | Raj Kamal, Charulatha, Umashree, Mandya Ramesh | Rajan–Nagendra |
| Jagadeeshwari | Rama Narayanan | Saikumar, Shruti, Shamili, Archana | Shankar–Ganesh |
| Jagath Kiladi | Chikkanna | Jaggesh, Charulatha, Pavitra Lokesh | Rajan–Nagendra |
| Jaidev | H. Vasu | Jaggesh, Charulatha, Ashok, Srinath, Doddanna | Rajesh Ramanath |
| Jai Hind | S. S. David | Devaraj, Nivedita Jain, B. C. Patil, Raghuvaran | V. Manohar |
| Kanasalu Neene Manasalu Neene | Nanjunda K. | Vineeth, Prakash Raj, Ayesha Jhulka, S. P. Balasubrahmanyam | Chaitanya |
| Karnataka Police | J. G. Krishna | Devaraj, Bhanuchander, Yamini, Bhavyashree Rai | Sadhu Kokila |
| Kowrava | S. Mahendar | B. C. Patil, Prema, Bank Janardhan, Tennis Krishna | Hamsalekha |
| King | Srikanth Kulkarni | Tiger Prabhakar, Arun Pandian, Anjana | Deva |
| Kurubana Rani | D. Rajendra Babu | Shiva Rajkumar, Nagma, Lokesh | V. Manohar |
| Maathina Malla | Yogesh Hunsur | Jaggesh, Vijayalakshmi, Charulatha | V. Manohar |
| Majanu | Dwarakish | Giri Dwarakish, Raaga, Nikita Palekar | |
| Mangalyam Tantunanena | V. S. Reddy | V. Ravichandran, Ramya Krishna, S. P. Balasubrahmanyam | V. Manohar |
| Mari Kannu Hori Myage | Kumar | Jaggesh, Suvarna Mathew, Archana, Uttara, Dheerendra Gopal, Tennis Krishna | Rajesh Ramnath |
| Marthanda | Chikkanna | Tiger Prabhakar, Shruti, Lokanath | Sadhu Kokila |
| Megha Bantu Megha | S. Mahendar | Ramesh Aravind, Shilpa, Archana, Ashalatha, Doddanna | V. Manohar |
| Mr. Putsami | V. Umakanth | Shiva Rajkumar, Suman, Laali, Srinath, Lokesh | Hamsalekha |
| Nammura Huduga | Ravindranath | Shiva Rajkumar, Shruti, Jayanthi | V. Manohar |
| Nishyabda | Dinesh Baboo | Vishnuvardhan, Revathi, Mohini, Sumanth, Ramakrishna | Stephen - Dharma |
| One Man Army | Thriller Manju | Abhijeeth, Thriller Manju, Suman, Kasthuri | Sadhu Kokila |
| Preethsod Thappa | V. Ravichandran | V. Ravichandran, Shilpa Shetty, Lakshmi, Lokesh, Prakash Raj, Vinaya Prasad | Hamsalekha |
| Shanti Shanti Shanti | Srinivas | R. Madhavan, Abbas, Prema, Satish Shah, Bhavna Pani | Sandeep Chowta |
| Simhada Guri | U. Narayan Rao | Vishnuvardhan, Amulya, Charulatha | Shiva |
| Sorry | Nee Sudarshan | Raghuvaran, Madhukar, Kausalya, Shobhraj | Sadhu Kokila |
| Sri Siddharooda Mahatme | Bheemsen | Rajesh, Tara, Sadashiva Brahmavar | G K |
| Suvvi Suvvalali | S. Mahendar | Ramesh Aravind, Shilpa, Charulatha | Hamsalekha |
| Swasthik | Upendra | Raghavendra Rajkumar, Vijayalakshmi, Srinath, Honnavalli Krishna | V. Manohar |
| Tavarina Kanike | B. Gururaj | Ramkumar, Shruti, Vanishree | V. Manohar |
| Thriller Killer | Thriller Manju | Thriller Manju, Akhila | Sadhu Kokila |
| Thutta Mutta | Kishore Sarja | Ramesh Aravind, Prema, Kasthuri, Sujatha, Sanketh Kashi | Hamsalekha |
| Vajra | V. Prabhakar | Ramkumar, Rasika, Doddanna, Bank Janardhan | Upendra Kumar |
| Veeranna | H. Vasu | Jaggesh, Ravali, Srinath, Tennis Krishna | V. Manohar |
| Yaare Neenu Cheluve | D. Rajendra Babu | V. Ravichandran, Sangita, Heera Rajagopal, Tara, Jaggesh, Vishnuvardhan | Hamsalekha |
| Yamalokadalli Veerappan | H. P. Prakash | Dheerendra Gopal, Sadhu Kokila, Akhila | Sadhu Kokila |

== See also ==
- Kannada films of 1997
- Kannada films of 1999
