= List of Kannada films of 2000 =

== Highest grossing films ==
Rank	Title	Collection	Ref.
1.	Yajamana	₹22 crore (₹107.35 crore in 2025)	
2.	Preethse	₹15 crore (₹73.19 crore in 2025)	
3.	Shabdavedhi	₹13 crore (₹63.43 crore in 2025)	
4.	Deepavali	₹7 crore (₹35.55 crore in 2025)	
5.	Devara Maga	₹5 crore (₹25.39 crore in 2025)	

== List of released films ==
The following is a list of films produced in the Kannada film industry in India in 2000, presented in alphabetical order.

Title	Director	Cast	Music
Andhra Hendthi	A. R. Babu	Ramya Krishna, Madan Mallu, Ananth Nag, Thriller Manju, Jayanthi	Shivamaya
Astra	Anand P. Raju	Devaraj, B. C. Patil, Ragasudha, Chaithali, Jai Jagadish	Hamsalekha
Bannada Hejje	H. S. Rajashekar	Devaraj, Vinaya Prasad, Mukhyamantri Chandru, Ramesh Bhat	Hamsalekha
Bhakta Ayyappa	V. Swaminathan	Rajesh, Sanjay, Archana, Malathi Sudheer	Gandharva
Bhoomi	Gandharva	Devaraj, Charulatha, Lokanath, Karibasavaiah	Gandharva
Billa Ranga	K. S. R. Das	Devaraj, Suman, Ravali, Napolean	Koti
Chamundi	A. Mohan Gandhi	Malashri, Ananth Nag, Kushboo, Prakash Rai, Suresh Heblikar	Hamsalekha
Deepavali	Dinesh Baboo	Vishnuvardhan, Ramesh Aravind, Chandini, Bhavana, K. R. Vijaya, Ramesh Bhat	M. M. Keeravani
Devara Maga	D. Rajendra Babu	Ambareesh, Shivarajkumar, Laila, Bhanupriya, Tara, Srinath, Darshan Thoogudeep	Hamsalekha
Deveeri	Kavita Lankesh	Master Manja, Nandita Das, Bhavana, Sanket Kashi	V. Manohar
Durgada Huli	Ayyappa P. Sharma	Sai Kumar, Devaraj, Vineetha, Vijayalakshmi, B. V. Radha	Shree
Gaajina Mane	Jayaram K. V.	Ramkumar, Prema, Shivadwaj	Gandharva
Galate Aliyandru	S. Narayan	Shivarajkumar, S. Narayan, Sakshi Shivanand, Tara, Arun Pandian, Doddanna	Deva
Hagalu Vesha	Baraguru Ramachandrappa	Shivarajkumar, Reshma, Tara, Jai Jagadish, Pramila Joshai	Hamsalekha
Hats Off India	Raghunath R.	B. C. Patil, Sadhu Shetty, Ganesh, Ashitha	Hamsalekha
Independence Day	A. R. Ramesh	Sai Kumar, Arun Pandian, Roja, Vinaya Prasad, Ranjitha, Rockline Venkatesh	Deva
Indradhanush	V. Manohar	Shivarajkumar, Abhisaarika, Gurukiran, Charulatha, Avinash	V. Manohar
Jee Boomba	A. R. Babu	Pramod Chakravarthy, Reshma, Doddanna, Tennis Krishna	Sadhu Kokila
Khadga	Anand P. Raju	Sai Kumar, Shilpa, Indraja, Avinash	Sadhu Kokila
Kiladi	Om Sai Prakash	Jaggesh, Archana, Manichandana, Mukhyamantri Chandru	Sadhu Kokila
Krishnarjuna	Joe Simon	B. C. Patil, Ragasudha, Lokesh, Bank Janardhan	Gururaj
Krishna Leele	D. Rajendra Babu	Shivarajkumar, Suvalakshmi, Ananth Nag, Umashree	V. Manohar
Love in Nepal	B. R. Keshav	Ravikumar, Archana, Bhavyashree Rai, Nagesh Mayya	Maruthi Meerajkar
Mahathma	H. Vasu	Saikumar, Shruthi, V. Ravichandran, Vijayalakshmi	V. Ravichandran
Mathadana	T. N. Seetharam	Ananth Nag, Devaraj, Tara	C. Ashwath; V. Manohar
Mava Mava Maduve Mado	Arjun	Kashinath, Archana, Tharun, Ruthu, Bank Janardhan	Chaitanya
Maya Bazar	V. Umakanth	Kumar Govind, Prema, Ramesh Bhat, Avinash, Diwakar	V. Umakanth
Minchu	B. Ramamurthy	Devaraj, Tiger Prabhakar, Charulatha, Durgashree	N. Govardhan
Mundaithe Oora Habba	Dhavala Satyam	Jaggesh, Raasi, Indraja, S. P. Balasubrahmanyam	V. Manohar
Munnudi	P. Sheshadri	Tara, H. G. Dattatreya	V. Manohar
Naga Devathe	Om Sai Prakash	Soundarya, Prema, Saikumar, Charulatha, Tara	Hamsalekha
Nan Hendthi Chennagidale	Dinesh Babu	Ananth Nag, Kashi, Anjana Takkar, Vishnuvardhan, Ramesh Arvind	Rajesh Ramanath
Nannavalu Nannavalu	S. Narayan	S. Narayan, Prema, Doddanna, Dheerendra Gopal	Prashant Raj
Naxalite	Shivamani	Devaraj, Vijayalakshmi, Thriller Manju, Srinath	Hamsalekha
Nee Nanna Jeeva	Sathyajith	Charan Raj, Charulatha, Sathyajith, Akhila, Bank Janardhan	Guna Singh
O Nanna Nalle	V. Ravichandran	V. Ravichandran, Isha Koppikar, Srinivasa Murthy, Sadhu Kokila	V. Ravichandran
Paapigala Lokadalli	H. S. Rajashekar	Saikumar, Charanraj, Vineetha, Avinash, Jai Jagadish	Sadhu Kokila
Poli Bhava	P. Sukumar	Ajay Kumar, Archana, Reshma, Bank Janardhan, Girija Lokesh	M. S. Maruthi
Preethse	D. Rajendra Babu	Upendra, Shivarajkumar, Sonali Bendre, Ananth Nag	Hamsalekha
Preethsu Thappenilla	V. S. Reddy	V. Ravichandran, Rachana Banerjee, Suman Nagarkar, Srinivasa Murthy	V. Ravichandran
Premi	Ananthu	Ramkumar, Thushara, Hemapriya, Mukhyamantri Chandru, Vaishali Kasaravalli	N. Govardhan
Shabdavedhi	S. Narayan	Dr. Rajkumar, Jayapradha, Sowcar Janaki, K. S. Ashwath, Chi Guru Dutt	Hamsalekha
Shrirasthu Shubhamasthu	Seetharam Karanth	Ramesh Aravind, Anu Prabhakar, Naveen Krishna, Srinivasa Murthy	K. Kalyan
Soorappa	Naganna	Vishnuvardhan, Shruthi, Anu Prabhakar, Charan Raj, Chi Guru Dutt, Ramesh Bhat	Hamsalekha
Sparsha	Sunil Kumar Desai	Sudeep, Sparsha Rekha, Sudharani, Naveen Mayur, Sihi Kahi Chandru	Hamsalekha
Sulthan	Kumar	Jaggesh, Savitha, Ambika, Tennis Krishna	Hamsalekha
Sundara Purusha	Satya Murthy	Shashikumar, Indraja, Avinash, Nisha	Sadhu Kokila
Swalpa Adjust Madkolli	Kodlu Ramakrishna	Ananth Nag, Suhasini, Damini, Shruti, Tara, Ramkumar, Gurukiran, Ramakrishna	Sadhu Kokila
Thimmaraya	Shivaji Rao Singanamane	Sadhu Kokila, Sambhrama, Nisha, Doddanna, Umashree	Sadhu Kokila
Ticket Tickets	J. G. Krishna	Sai Kumar, Sadhu Kokila, Thriller Manju, Raksha, Pramodini	Sadhu Kokila
Uttara Dhruvadim Dakshina Druvaku	C. P. Yogeshwar	C. P. Yogeshwar, Prema	Vijay Anand
Yare Nee Abhimani	D. Rajendra Babu	Shivarajkumar, Ramya Krishnan, Sangita	Hamsalekha
Yaarige Saluthe Sambala	M. S. Rajashekar	Ananth Nag, Urvashi, Anu Prabhakar, Suhasini Maniratnam, Shashikumar, Mohan, Umashree, Karibasavaiah	Hamsalekha
Yajamana	R. Sheshadri	Vishnuvardhan, Prema, Shashikumar, Abhijeeth, Pavithra Lokesh, Archana	Rajesh Ramanath
