= Maathina Malla =

1998 film directed by Yogish Hunsur

- Directed by: Yogish Hunsur
- Written by: Yogish Hunsur (Story); K. Nanjunda (Screenplay); Ashwin Kumar (Dialogue)
- Produced by: Dr. Sathyamurthy Kotam Raju
- Starring: Jaggesh; Charulatha; Vijayalakshmi; Swarna
- Cinematography: Ramesh Babu
- Edited by: Basavaraj Urs
- Music by: V. Manohar
- Production company: Sri Rajarajeshwari Creations
- Release date: 1998
- Running time: 126 minutes
- Country: India
- Language: Kannada

Maathina Malla (transl. Wag) is a 1998 Indian Kannada-language comedy film written and directed by Yogish Hunsur. The film stars Jaggesh and Charulatha. V. Manohar scored and composed the film's soundtrack while Ramesh Babu handled the cinematography.

== Cast ==
- Jaggesh
- Charulatha
- Vijayalakshmi
- Swarna
- Vanishree
- Ramakrishna
- Bank Janardhan
- Mandya Ramesh
- Umashree
- M. S. Umesh
- M. N. Lakshmi Devi

== Soundtrack ==
Maathina Malla

Soundtrack album by V. Manohar
- Released: 9 July 1998
- Studio: Sanketh Electronics
- Genre: Feature film soundtrack
- Length: 22:30
- Language: Kannada
- Label: Jhankar Music

V. Manohar chronology
Kurubana Rani (1998)	Maathina Malla (1998)	Mangalyam Thanthunanena (1998)

No.	Title	Singers	Length
1.	"Jolly Timepass"	Nanditha	4:08
2.	"Prema Roga"	K. S. Chitra, Rajesh Krishnan	4:49
3.	"Badukodhu Kalithuko"	S. P. Balasubrahmanyam	4:18
4.	"Muthu Sarava"	Rajesh Krishnan; Nanditha	4:38
5.	"Mella Mellane"	Supriya	4:39
Total length:			22:30
