= List of Kannada films of 1996 =

The following is a list of films produced in the Kannada film industry in India in 1996, presented in alphabetical order.

== Top-grossing films ==
Rank	Title	Collection	Ref.
1.	Janumada Jodi	₹15 crore (₹87.9 crore in 2025)	
2.	Nammoora Mandara Hoove	₹8 crore (₹46.88 crore in 2025)	
3.	Sipayi	₹8 crore (₹46.88 crore in 2025)	
4.	Police Story	₹7 crore (₹41.02 crore in 2025)	
5.	Jeevanadhi	₹5 crore (₹29.3 crore in 2025)	
6.	Annavra Makkalu	₹3 crore (₹17.58 crore in 2025)	

== List of released films ==
Title	Director	Cast	Music
Aadithya	K. N. Lokachandran	Shiva Rajkumar, Rubainaa, Madhu Bangarappa, Neelam Kothari	Rajesh Ramanath
Aayudha	Ayyappa P. Sharma	Sai Kumar, Vijayashanti, Sithara, Raghuvaran	Ram Chakravarthy
Annavra Makkalu	Phani Ramachandra	Shiva Rajkumar, Maheshwari, Reman Singh, Suneha, Srinath	Rajesh Ramanath
Anuraga Devathe	Bhaskar	Shashikumar, Sithara, Sathyapriya	Shankar
Anuraga Spandana	B. Ramamurthy	Ananth Nag, Vinaya Prasad, Abhishek, Rajashree	Pampa
Appaji	D. Rajendra Babu	Vishnuvardhan, Aamani, Saranya Ponvannan, Vajramuni	M. M. Keeravani
Arishina Kumkuma	G. K. Mudduraj	Sridhar, Malashri, Dileep	V. Manohar
Balina Jyothi	T. Kranthikumar	Vishnuvardhan, Aamani, Dwarakish, Vinaya Prasad	Rajan–Nagendra
Bangarada Mane	H. R. Bhargava	Devaraj, Sithara, Kashinath, Hema Panchamukhi	Rajan–Nagendra
Boss	K. P. Bhavani Shankar	Tiger Prabhakar, Ramesh Aravind, Sharanya, Sindhu Rao	Sadhu Kokila
Circle Inspector	A. Mohan Gandhi	Devaraj, Malashri, Raghuvaran, Sai Kumar, Suresh Heblikar	Hamsalekha
Dhani	Om Prakash Rao	Vishnuvardhan, Vineetha, Tara, Umashree, Dheerendra Gopal	Sadhu Kokila
Gaaya	Vemagal Jagannath Rao	Ramkumar, Sharath Babu, Apoorva, Geetha	M. M. Keeravani
Gajanura Gandu	Anand P. Raju	Shiva Rajkumar, Narmada, Jayanthi	Sadhu Kokila
Geluvina Saradara	Relangi Narasimha Rao	Raghavendra Rajkumar, Shruti, Jayamala, Srinath	Hamsalekha
God Father	G. K. Mudduraj	Charanraj, Thyagarajan, Abhijeeth, Shruti, Vinaya Prasad	Shyam
Gulaabi	S. Narayan	Ramkumar, Roshini, Doddanna	Ilaiyaraaja
Hello Daddy	Naganna	Vishnuvardhan, Sonakshi, Surabhi, Master Nithin	Hamsalekha
Hettavaru	S. Mahendar	Kalyan Kumar, Lakshmi, Abhijeeth, Sai Kumar, Shwetha, Srishanti	Hamsalekha
Huliya	K. V. Raju	Devaraj, Archana, Pooja Lokesh	Sadhu Kokila
Ibbara Naduve Muddina Aata	Relangi Narasimha Rao	Raghavendra Rajkumar, Shiva Rajkumar, Kasthuri, Swarna, Tara	Sadhu Kokila
Janumada Jodi	T. S. Nagabharana	Shiva Rajkumar, Shilpa, Pavithra Lokesh, Mandya Ramesh	V. Manohar
Jeevanadhi	D. Rajendra Babu	Vishnuvardhan, Ananth Nag, Kushboo, Urvashi, Tara	Koti
Karnataka Suputra	Vijay	Vishnuvardhan, Rituparna Sengupta, Vajramuni	M. M. Keeravani
Karpoorada Gombe	S. Mahendar	Ramesh Aravind, Shruti, Shwetha, Sharan	Hamsalekha
Minugu Thare	Shivamani	Kumar Govind, Shruti, Shwetha, Gazar Khan	Rajesh Ramanath
Mouna Raga	S. Mahendar	Ambareesh, Vinaya Prasad, Srishanti, Tara	Hamsalekha
Muddina Aliya	H. Vasu	Shashikumar, Sithara, Shwetha, Kalyan Kumar	V. Manohar
Nammoora Mandara Hoove	Sunil Kumar Desai	Ramesh Aravind, Shiva Rajkumar, Prema, Suman Nagarkar	Ilaiyaraaja
Nirbandha	H. S. Rajashekar	Ananth Nag, Shashikumar, Kumar Bangarappa, Jayamala, Ujwala, Renuka	Rajesh Ramanath
Palegara	Om Prakash Rao	Ambareesh, Kushboo, Nirosha	Hamsalekha
Pattanakke Banda Putta	J. Balaram	Jaggesh, Subhashri, Srinath, Mukhyamantri Chandru	V. Manohar
Police Story	Thriller Manju	Sai Kumar, Shobhraj, Avinash, Sudheer, Rockline Venkatesh	Sadhu Kokila
Pooja	Bharathi Shankar	Ramkumar, Pooja Lokesh, Madhukar, Naveen Chander, Doddanna	Hamsalekha
Rambha Rajyadalli Rowdy	B. S. Lakshman	Vinod Raj, Abhijeeth, Shruti, Nisha	Upendra Kumar
Rambo Raja Revolver Rani	A. T. Raghu	Charan Raj, Dolly, Srishanti, Sudheer	Upendra Kumar
Rangoli	P. H. Vishwanath	Sumanth, Ruchita Prasad, Ramesh Bhat, Rekha Das	V. Manohar
Saakida Gini	Jaikumar	Sai Kumar, Tara, Madhuri, Ravikiran	R Govardhan
Sathya Sangharsha	B. M. Shivaraju	Dhananjay, Vinaya Prasad, M. V. Vasudeva Rao	Sadhu Kokila
Shiva Leele	V. Swaminathan	Kalyan Kumar, Sithara, Lokesh, Sanjay	T. G. Lingappa
Shiva Sainya	Shivamani	Shiva Rajkumar, Nivedita Jain, Doddanna, Mukhyamantri Chandru, Arundhati Nag	Ilaiyaraaja
Shreemathi Kalyana	C. H. Balaji Singh	Raghavendra Rajkumar, Subhashri, Surabhi, Pournami	Sadhu Kokila
Simhadri	Raj Kishore	Devaraj, Sudharani, Supriya, Kalyan Kumar	Sadhu Kokila
Sipayi	V. Ravichandran	V. Ravichandran, Chiranjeevi, Soundarya, Tara	Hamsalekha
Soma	Y. Yesudas	Jaggesh, Subhashri, Bank Janardhan, Srinath	Sadhu Kokila
Soothradhara	M. S. Rajashekar	Raghavendra Rajkumar, Nivedita Jain, Panchami, Ravinder Mann	Hamsalekha
Sowbhagya Devate	Om Prakash Rao	Sridhar, Sai Kumar, Shruti, Vinaya Prasad	M. M. Srilekha
Stunt Master	V. Chandrahans	Siddharth, Sudharani, Jayanthi	Hamsalekha
Surya Puthra	Gurupriya	Ramkumar, Gulshan Kumar, Rajesh, Sangeetha	Rajan–Nagendra
Thavarina Thottilu	S. Narayan	Ramkumar, Shruti, Charanraj	Rajesh Ramanath
Thali Pooje	V. Chandrahans	Ananth Nag, Vinaya Prasad, Anjana, Ramesh Bhat	Hamsalekha
Vasantha Kavya	S. Narayan	K. Shivram, Sudharani, Prakash Rai, Leelavathi	Rajesh Ramanath
Veera Bhadra	N. R. Nanjunde Gowda	Devaraj, Anjana, Nassar, Doddanna	Hamsalekha
Yaaru?	B. R. Keshav	Anjali Sudhakar, Nagesh Mayya, Anand, Bhagya Prakash	Sadguna Raja

== See also ==
- Kannada films of 1995
- Kannada films of 1996
