= Sena (film) =

- Poster
- Directed by: Sujeeth
- Written by: M. Balu (dilaogues)
- Produced by: P. Suneetha Anandakumar
- Starring: Sathyaraj; Aravind Akash; Charulatha
- Cinematography: S. Kishan Sagar
- Edited by: K. Velayutham
- Music by: D. Imman
- Production company: Sri Saivani Movies
- Release date: 12 April 2003
- Running time: 155 minutes
- Country: India
- Language: Tamil

Sena (/seɪnɑː/) is a 2003 Indian Tamil-language crime film directed by Sujeeth. The film stars Sathyaraj, Aravind Akash and Charulatha while Anandaraj and Chandrasekhar play supporting roles. The film, produced by P. Suneetha Anandakumar, was released on 12 April 2003.

== Plot ==
Senathipathi "Sena" took to rowdyism as a young boy in order to feed his brother Vikram. Vikram hates rowdyism and wants Sena to stop his activities. There is a gang war between Mastan Bhai and Naaga's gangs. Sena works for Mastan, and Mastan considers Sena as his best henchman. Naaga, who was Mastan's former right-hand, wants to kill him. Vikram is in love with Janu, who is the sister of police officer Sathya. Sena is close to Sathya. Later, Sathya is killed by Mastan's henchmen, and Vikram wants to punish the culprits. What transpires next forms the rest of the story.

== Cast ==
- Sathyaraj as Senathipathi a.k.a. Sena
  - Vinod Kishan as young Sena
- Aravind Akash as Vikram
- Charulatha (credited as Raksha) as Janu
- Anandaraj as Mastan Bhai
- Chandrasekhar as Naaga
- Charle as Pandian
- Vijayan as Lawyer Jayan
- Anu Mohan as Govindaraj
- Vasu Vikram as Police Officer
- Rasheed Ummer as Inspector Pasupathy
- Pondy Ravi as Inspector Pondy
- Crane Manohar
- Alphonsa
- Ruban George as Kaasi
- Junior Silk

== Production ==
The film marked the directorial debut of Sujith who earlier worked with various directors in Telugu and Kannada films while it was produced by Srinivasa Raju, a producer from Kannada film industry. The first schedule was held at a bungalow at Chennai while a scene was shot at Vauhini Studios.

== Soundtrack ==
The soundtrack was composed by D. Imman.

Track listing
No.	Title	Lyrics	Singer(s)	Length
1.	"Ennodu Vantha"	Bharathiputhran	Srinivas	01:55
2.	"Indru Intha"	Annamalai	Meena	04:25
3.	"Naattukozhi Kulambu"	Na. Muthukumar	Mathangi, D. Imman	04:21
4.	"Sei Seiya Asiya"	Kadhal Mathi	Anuradha Sriram	04:12
5.	"Suthi Suthi Varuven"	Pasumpon	Tippu, Srilekha Parthasarathy	04:33
6.	"Theerathathu Kathal"	Vaigai Selvan	Unni Menon, Nithyasree Mahadevan	04:49
7.	"Uyir Pirinthalum"	Kadhal Mathi	Roshan, Chinmayi, Prathap Chandran	04:16
Total length:				28:31

== Critical reception ==
Malini Mannath of Chennai Online wrote "Blood and gore abound in the script. And it's ironical that the director in order to convey his message that violence doesn't pay, has used extreme forms of violence on the screen!".
