= Pratibhatane =

- DVD cover
- Directed by: Rajendra Kumar Arya
- Written by: Rajendra Kumar Arya (dialogue)
- Screenplay by: Rajendra Kumar Arya
- Story by: K. Shivaram
- Produced by: M. Ravi
- Starring: K. Shivaram; Vijayalakshmi
- Cinematography: R. C. Mapakshi
- Edited by: Shyam
- Music by: V. Manohar
- Release date: 26 February 1999
- Country: India
- Language: Kannada

Pratibhatane (transl. Protest) is a 1999 Indian Kannada-language drama film directed by Rajendra Kumar Arya and starring K. Shivaram and Vijayalakshmi.

== Cast ==
- K. Shivaram as Basava
- Vijayalakshmi as Sudha
- Kanchana
- Keerthiraj
- Shani Mahadevappa
- Honnavalli Krishna
- Vaijanath Biradar
- Karibasavaiah

== Soundtrack ==
The music was composed by V. Manohar. The lyrics are written by K. G. Prasad, V. Manohar, and Siddalingaiah. The song "Hasuvina" written by Siddalingaiah, under the pseudonym of Aditya, (Note: Siddalingaiah was a dalit and didn't want to get accused of getting lured by the commercial film industry.) was reportedly a "smash hit" and won the Karnataka State Film Award for Best Lyricist.

Track listing
No.	Title	Singer(s)	Length
1.	"Chori Chori"	Rajesh Krishnan, K. S. Chithra	4:09
2.	"Baale Naviloora"	Rajesh Krishnan, K. S. Chithra	4:24
3.	"Hasuvina"	Rajesh Krishnan	4:44
4.	"Sarasakke Baare"	Rajesh Krishnan, K. S. Chithra	4:27
5.	"Varadakshine"	Rajesh Krishnan	4:28
Total length:			22:12

== Reception ==
Srikanth Srinivasa of Deccan Herald wrote that "Director Rajendra Arya has given a clean social film with he himself pitching in with a good performance. V Manohar is back with a bang, with a good musical score. The editing could have been tighter".
