= Neelambari (2001 film) =

- VCD cover
- Directed by: Surya
- Written by: M D Sridhar; Sunil Parameshwar; Surya
- Produced by: M D Sridhar; Karisubbu; N R Chandrashekhar; Tiptur Raju; D.S. Prakash Rao
- Starring: Ramya Krishna; Devaraj; Prema; Vinod Alva; Suman; Charulatha
- Cinematography: Krishna Kumar
- Edited by: D. Raja
- Music by: Rajesh Ramanath
- Release date: 9 October 2001
- Country: India
- Language: Kannada

Neelambari is 2001 Indian Kannada-language fantasy film directed by Surya and starring Ramya Krishna, Devaraj, Prema, Vinod Alva, Suman, and Charulatha.

== Plot ==
In the village of Neeli Batta, human sacrifices occur. A five-member TV channel crew (including Vinod) comes to report on the village. Charuhasan asks the crew to see Akhila who can tell them the story. Two members of the crew get murdered. Police officer Bharath and his wife Durga come to investigate the murders. A flashback is told about how both beautiful Malli and an ordinary looking Neela had fought over who gets Veera and eventually Malli had married Veera. A furious Neela has used her father's powers, done a yaaga (transl. sacrifice), transformed into Akhila and creates havoc in the village. How Akhila is defeated forms the rest of the story.

== Cast ==
- Ramya Krishna as Malli/Akhila Shivaram (renamed with Neelambari's soul inside her)/Goddess Durga
- Devaraj as Bharath
- Prema as Durga
- Vinod Alva as Vinod
- Suman as Veera
- Charulatha as Neelambari
- Tara
- Charuhasan as old man
- Pramod Chakravarthy
- Michael Madhu
- Ranganath as Neelambari's father (uncredited)

== Release and reception ==
The film was later dubbed in Telugu in April 2002. A critic from Sify said that "What can you say more about this super natural movie mixed with special effects? Well if you like Ramya go for it". Gudipoodi Srihari of The Hindu wrote that "The narration drags, taking good time to present the obvious. The film belongs to Ramya who plays different characters that come into picture at different stages". Arpan Panicker of Full Hyderabad opined that "It ain't different enough." Overall the reviews were not favorable.
