= Simhada Guri =

- Directed by: U. Narayan Rao
- Written by: Ravi Srivatsa (dialogues)
- Screenplay by: Chaithanya Prasad
- Story by: U. Narayan Rao
- Produced by: K. Raghava Rao
- Starring: Vishnuvardhan; Amulya; Charulatha; Shobhraj
- Cinematography: K. Rajendra Prasad
- Edited by: K. Narasaiah
- Music by: Shiva
- Production company: Kalyani Enterprises
- Distributed by: Kalyani Enterprises
- Release date: 14 May 1998
- Running time: 115 min
- Country: India
- Language: Kannada

Simhada Guri (transl. Aim of a lion) is a 1998 Indian Kannada film, directed by U. Narayan Rao and produced by K. Raghava Rao. The film stars Vishnuvardhan, Amulya, Charulatha and Shobhraj in lead roles. The film had musical score by Shiva.

== Cast ==
- Vishnuvardhan
- Amulya
- Charulatha
- Shobhraj
- Lakshman
- Lohithaswa
- Sarigama Viji
- Umesh
- Karibasavaiah
- M. V. Vasudeva Rao
- Harish Roy
- Sathyajith
- M. S. Karanth
- Srishailan
- Nanjundaiah
- M. N. Lakshmi Devi
- Rekha Das
- Nizhalgal Ravi

== Soundtrack ==
Soundtrack was composed by R. I. Shiva.

- "Bantu Kaamanabillu" - Rajesh Krishnan, Manjula Gururaj
- "Nanneda Goodina" - Rajesh Krishnan, Suneetha
- "Nanna Sogasige" - Sowmya
- "Chandulli Maina" - Manjula Gururaj

== Reception ==
The Hindu wrote "Vishnuvardhan complements V Narayana Rao’s pointed direction with a dignified and natural performance. 'Simhada Guri’, despite its violence as almost justified by its genre, is absorbing and it retains that gripping quality almost until the end, notwithstanding its clichéd subject."
