= Killer Diary =

1995 Kannada film by Srinivas Reddy

- Directed by: Srinivas Reddy
- Written by: Srinivas Babu; Srinivas Reddy; Sri Durga Creations
- Produced by: M. N. Muralikrishna; K. B. Satish Kumar; Smt. Gangammma; V. K. Ramu
- Starring: Devaraj; Shruti; Sanketh Kashi; Tara; Mukhyamantri Chandru
- Cinematography: N. Babu; C. D. Raju
- Edited by: Narasaiah
- Music by: Vijayanand
- Production company: Sri Durga Creations
- Release date: 1995
- Running time: 132 minutes
- Country: India
- Language: Kannada

Killer Diary (Note: Though the film's name is Killer Diary a few websites have named it Killer Dairy.) is a 1995 Indian Kannada-language thriller film directed by Srinivas Reddy starring Devaraj and Shruti. The film was jointly produced by M. N. Muralikrishna, V. K. Ramu, K. B. Satish Kumar and Smt. Gangamma in the banner of Sri Durga Creations. Srinivas Babu wrote the story for which the screenplay was penned by Srinivas Reddy. The film edited by Narasaiah had musical score by Vijayanand while cinematography was handled by N. Babu and C. D. Raju.

== Plot ==
Kavya, an author, resides in Prashanthi housing colony. Her close friends, who also reside in the same colony are Apsara, Maaji, Latha, Rajani and Tanuja. Her uncle moves into a house as he has begun a coffin manufacturing business in the vicinity and soon makes friends with an astrologer.

=== Killer Diary Part 1 ===
Kavya writes a thriller story titled Killer Diary which is published as a weekly serialisation in a magazine published by Kannada Dundhubi the proprietor of which is Mahanandi. The magazine is released every Thursday.

Next week Tuesday night, a few people in the housing colony are seen moving around suspiciously. A mysterious killer murders Rajani and drops her corpse in the water tank. The case is handed over to Special Crime Branch Officer Pratap. A man, meanwhile, confesses to an old lady to have committed the murder.

=== Killer Diary Part 2 ===
Sub-Inspector Bhrammappa and two constables are put in charge of the colony's security. Pratap who arrives in the colony finds that three of the colony's workers - Annamma, Channaiah and Kittappa are former criminals. Bhrammappa and his subordinates come across the corpse of the second victim, Tanuja.

=== Killer Diary Part 3 ===
It is revealed that the murder happens as depicted in the weekly series Killer Diary. Moreover, from the earlier two crime scenes two letters A and Y were obtained. Kavya begins to develop feelings for Pratap while Pratap is seen caring for his mentally unstable wife Kusuma. The same man from the earlier scene is shown making arrangements for another murder. The third victim is Maaji who is the area MLA. Pratap learns from the footprints obtained in the crime scene that the killer has a limp and is shocked to find that these traits are similar to that of the commissioner.

=== Killer Diary Part 4 ===
The presumed killer is seen eagerly reading the latest chapter of Killer Diary. The fourth victim is Latha. After her death, Pratap concludes that Kavya might be the killer. From her house he catches the presumed killer who reveals that he is Kusuma's brother. An ex-military man he had a burning desire to punish the 5 women who were responsible for his sister being insane. He further reveals that someone had murdered them before him and he intended to steal the next copy's written material so as to kill the fifth person. The fifth person happens to be actress Apsara who despite almost tight security gets murdered on stage while performing at a major event. Three more letters — V, A and K are obtained which upon joining with the other two gives Kavya. Meanwhile, Kavya, who follows Pratap to a secret mansion gets enough evidence to prove that Pratap is the real murderer and gets him arrested before he could frame Kavya. When Pratap escapes, the commissioner moves Kavya to a safe house. However, Pratap reaches there and reveals why he targeted the six friends. Exactly an year before, the 6 friends driving their car recklessly hit a pregnant Kusuma standing beside the road leading to abortion and her losing sanity. They went away without helping her. Before he could kill her he is stopped by Pratap revealing that the killer is not Pratap but his look-alike. The real killer tried to frame Pratap since he felt in the presence of Pratap it would be difficult to kill Kavya. After a minor fight, the killer flees and later escapes with his wife. However, eventually, he is shot by the commissioner and before dying hands over Kusuma to Kavya. Kavya and Pratap unite.

== Cast ==
Actor	Character
Devaraj	Special Crime Branch Officer Pratap / Golibar Govinda and Killer(Double Role)
Shruti	Kavya
Sanketh Kashi	Sub-Inspector Bhrammappa
Tara	Apsara
Mukhyamantri Chandru	Kavya's uncle
Bank Janardhan	Mahanandi
Shivaram	Astrologer
Umashree	Maaji
Sathyajith	Kusuma's brother
Sarigama Viji	Constable
M. S. Karanth	

== Music ==
Killer Diary

Soundtrack album by Vijayanand
- Genre: Feature film soundtrack
- Language: Kannada
- Label: Jhankar Music

Vijayanand chronology
Adhipathi (1994)	Killer Diary (1995)	Utthara Dhruvamdim Dakshina Dhruvaku (2000)

The soundtrack album scored and composed by Vijayanand comprises 4 tracks.

=== Tracks ===
Track name	Singer(s)
Ammamma Enu	Manjula Gururaj
Kele Kusumave	SPB
Bharatambe	SPB
Haalu Kodu	SPB, Rajesh

== Release ==
The film was given a U certificate by the regional office of Censor Board at Bengaluru with the certificate dated 3 February 1995. The film had 12 cuts.
