= 27 Mavalli Circle =

1986 film directed by T. N. Narasimhan

- Directed by: T. N. Narasimhan
- Produced by: T. N. Narasimhan
- Starring: T. N. Narasimhan; Devaraj; Kalpana Reddy; Umashri
- Cinematography: Sundarnath Suvarna
- Edited by: K. Balu
- Music by: L Vaidyanathan
- Production company: S N Creations
- Release date: 1986
- Running time: 111 minutes
- Country: India
- Language: Kannada

27 Mavalli Circle is a 1986 Indian Kannada language thriller film directed, written, produced, and enacted by T. N. Narasimhan. The film is adapted from Narasimhan's stage play of the same name which starred Lohithaswa in the lead role. The rest of the cast includes Devaraj in his film debut, Umashri, and Kalpana Reddy. The film's score is by L. Vaidyanathan. The story is based on Frederick Knott's 1966 play Wait Until Dark.

== Cast ==
- Kalpana Reddy
- Umashree as Rosie
- T. N. Narasimhan
- Avinash as P. R. Arun Kumar
- Devaraj as Gunda
- H. G. Somashekar Rao
- Baby Rashmi Rai
- Master Jayanth
- A. S. Murthy
- Krishne Gowda
- Pramod
- Sudheendra
