= Akashadoothu (TV series) =

Indian television drama

- Genre: Family Drama; Romance
- Created by: M.Renjith
- Based on: Akashadoothu
- Developed by: Dennis Joseph
- Written by: Santhosh Echikkanam
- Directed by: Adithyan
- Starring: See below
- Opening theme: "കാടിലെ മൈനയെ പാട്ടുപഠിപ്പിച്ചതാര് Kaatile Mainaye Paattu Padipichathaaru by K. S. Chithra
- Ending theme: "രാപ്പാടി കേഴുന്നുവോ" "Raappaadi Kezhunnuvo" by K. S. Chithra
- Composers: Sanand George/Ouseppachan; O. N. V. Kurup (lyrics)
- Country of origin: India
- Original language: Malayalam
- No. of episodes: 501

Production
- Executive producer: Chippy Renjith
- Producer: M.Renjith
- Camera setup: Multi-camera
- Running time: 22 minutes
- Production company: Rajaputra Visual Media

Original release
- Network: Surya TV
- Release: 24 October 2011 – 4 October 2013

Related
- Akashadoothu

Akashadoothu is 2011 Malayalam language Television drama produced by M.Renjith aired on Surya TV. It is a sequel to 1993 Indian Malayalam-language drama film Akashadoothu directed by Sibi Malayil.The film tells the tale of a widow suffering from leukemia, the series takes off exactly 16 years after we saw the children going their separate ways after the funeral of their mother.

Malayalam actress Chippy plays the lead role of Meenu along with Veteran actors K.P.A.C. Lalitha, Sukumari, Vanitha Krishnachandran, Seema G. Nair, Prem Prakash, Jose Prakash plays the supporting roles.

== Plot ==
After the demise of Annie (Madhavi), the four children parts away and after sixteen years Meenu ( eldest daughter played by Chippy) tries to reunite with her younger brothers Tony, Rony and Monu. However things take an unexpected turn when they reunite.

== Cast ==
- Chippy Renjith as Meenu Nandagopan
- Shiju Abdul Rasheed as Adv.Nandagopan
- Prem Prakash as Aanjilimuttam Joy
- Seema G. Nair as Jessy
- Vineeth as Monu a.k.a. Kevin David
- Anand VR as Tony
- _____ as Rony
- Sonia as Mollykutty Philip
- Saju Attingal as Philip
- Rajesh Hebbar as Dr.David
- Manju Satheesh as Mini
- K.P.A.C. Lalitha as Clara Kunjamma
- Sukumari as Brigathamma
- J. Pallassery as Nandagopan's father
- Meera Krishna as Krishna
- Kezia Joseph
- Santhosh Kurup
- Vanitha Krishnachandran as Marykunju
- Rahul Mohan as Alex
- Varsha as Shirley
- Yathikumar as Xavier
- Kottayam Rasheed as Pulikattil Mathachan
- Murugan as Madhavan
- Jose Prakash as Father (Cameo Appearance)
- Aaranmulla Ponnamma as Anjilimoottil Annaamma
- Anil Murali
- Adithyan Jayan
- Priyanka Nair
- Sharika Menon as Nirmala
- Geetha Nair as Krishna's mother
- Raghavan as Krishna's father
- Ambika Mohan
- Vishnu Prakash as Nandagopan's brother
- Devu Krishnan
- Manoj as CI Cleetus
- Subhash Menon
- Ashraf Pezhumoodu
- Rajeev Pala
- Seema
- Archana Menon
- Prakash
- Rugmini
- Sreekutty
- Anjana Appukuttan
- Srilakshmi
- Krishna Prabha

=== Appearance from the movie ===
- Madhavi as Annie
- Murali as Johnny
- Seena Antony as Meenu
- Ben K Alexander as Monu
- Martin as Roni
- Joseph Antony as Tony
- Nedumudi Venu as Fr.Vattapara
- Subair as Dr. David
- Bindu Panicker as Marykunju
- Suvarna Mathew as Mini
