= Wait Until Dark =

1966 play by Frederick Knott

- Playbill for the Broadway premiere starring Lee Remick (1966)
- Original language: English
- Written by: Frederick Knott
- Genre: Thriller
- Setting: A basement apartment in Greenwich Village.

Premiere
- Date: February 2, 1966
- Place: Ethel Barrymore Theatre, New York City

Wait Until Dark is a play by Frederick Knott, first performed on Broadway in 1966 and often revived since then. A film adaptation was released in 1967, and the play was published in the same year.

== Synopsis ==
Susy Hendrix is a blind Greenwich Village housewife who becomes the target of three con-men searching for the heroin hidden in a doll, which her husband Sam unwittingly transported from Canada as a favor to a woman who has since been murdered. "Roat" leads his companions into thinking that they are going to be rich and will get the heroin soon enough, but in the end he murders all of his partners after they outlive their usefulness.

The trio tries to convince Susy that her husband will be suspected of murdering the woman, and the only way to protect him is to give them the doll, which connects him to her. Little do the men know that Gloria, a little girl in the upstairs apartment, has stolen the doll after finding out it was not a gift for her.

One of the men poses as Sergeant Carlino, a strange police detective, while another poses as Mike, an old friend of her husband dropping by for a visit. Susy relies on "Mike", and he eventually begins to feel sympathy for her.

"Roat" poses as both the elderly Mr. Roat and his "son", Roat Junior. Roat Senior ransacks Susy's room and steals a wedding photo from the bedroom. He threatens Susy's and her husband's well-being, so she calls the police. Her call is intercepted by "Mike", and Susy is visited by "Sergeant Carlino".

Gloria returns and admits her theft of the doll, and Susy hides it. Susy contacts "Mike" to ask for help now that the doll is found. Gloria has been watching the nearby phone booth used by the con-men, and she alerts Susy that all three of the men she has been dealing with are tricking her. Susy sends Gloria to meet her husband on his way home from work, and begins planning to handle the intruders.

Roat kills both of his partners after the men discover Susy has the doll in the apartment. He spills gas around the apartment to destroy any evidence.

Susy turns off all the lights so that "Roat" cannot see her. "Roat" uses matches to see until Susy douses him with the gasoline. He uses the refrigerator light to see, threatens Susy, and tries to kill her. She ultimately defeats "Roat".

Sam bursts in with the police and finds that Susy has already dealt with Roat. He sees that Mike is also dead. Gloria yells at the police when they appear too patronizing to Susy and defends Susy's ability to take care of herself. After the police leave, Susy and Sam embrace.

== Productions ==
=== Original ===
Produced by Fred Coe and directed by Arthur Penn, the Broadway premiere of Wait Until Dark opened on February 2, 1966, at the Ethel Barrymore Theatre. Within the next 11 months, it transferred to the Shubert, the George Abbott, and the Music Box Theatre, running for 373 performances.

- Lee Remick as Susy Hendrix
- Robert Duvall as Harry Roat Jr.
- Mitchell Ryan as Mike Talman
- Val Bisoglio as Sgt. Carlino
- James Congdon as Sam Hendrix
- Julie Herrod as Gloria

Remick was nominated for the Tony Award for Best Actress in a Play.

The West End production, with Honor Blackman and Peter Sallis, at the Strand Theatre, was also successful, running for nearly two years, during which time Barbara Murray and Lana Morris took over from Blackman in the lead.

=== Revivals ===
The play was produced by the Brunton Theatre Company, Musselburgh, under the direction of Sandy Neilson during its first season in 1979.

After 11 previews, a Broadway revival directed by Leonard Foglia opened on April 5, 1998, at the Brooks Atkinson Theatre, where it ran for 97 performances. The cast included Marisa Tomei, Quentin Tarantino and Stephen Lang.

A 2003 London revival, followed by a UK tour, featured Susie Amy, Derren Nesbitt and Michael Melia. The setting was changed to Notting Hill.

A production of the play took place at the Edinburgh Festival Fringe in 2010. It was performed at the Royal College of Surgeons of Edinburgh by students of Oxford University.

On October 16, 2013, a revised version by Jeffrey Hatcher opened at the Geffen Playhouse in Los Angeles, featuring Allison Pill, Adam Stein, and Mather Zickel. The story was backdated to 1944, and Sam and Mike are supposedly Marine buddies who served together in Italy.

== Adaptations ==
Film poster

Warner Bros. Pictures purchased the film rights in February 1966, before the play's Broadway debut at the Ethel Barrymore Theatre on February 2, 1966. The film, directed by Terence Young from a screenplay by Robert Carrington and Jane-Howard Carrington with a score by Henry Mancini, premiered at Radio City Music Hall in New York on October 26, 1967. It starred Audrey Hepburn, Alan Arkin, Richard Crenna, Efrem Zimbalist Jr., Jack Weston, and Julie Herrod, and was produced by Hepburn's then-husband, Mel Ferrer.

In an effort to duplicate the suspense on screen, movie theaters dimmed their lights to their legal limits, then turned off one by one until each light on-screen was shattered, resulting in the theater being plunged into complete darkness.

Hepburn was nominated for both the Academy Award and Golden Globe for Best Actress, and Zimbalist was nominated for a Golden Globe in the supporting category.

The film ranked tenth on Bravo's The 100 Scariest Movie Moments for its climactic scene, and it was ranked 55th on the list of American Film Institute's 100 Years...100 Thrills.

A 1982 TV movie starred Katharine Ross and Stacy Keach.

The movie was adapted into a 1986 Kannada-language movie 27 Mavalli Circle.

== Awards and nominations ==
=== Original Broadway production ===
Year	Award	Category	Nominee	Result
1966	Tony Award	Best Actress in a Play	Lee Remick	Nominated
