= Arunodaya (film) =

- Directed by: P. H. Vishwanath
- Written by: B. A. Madhu (dialogues)
- Screenplay by: P. H. Vishwanath
- Story by: P. H. Vishwanath
- Produced by: S. Sathish (Swamy)
- Starring: Ramesh Aravind; Vijayalakshmi; Shilpa
- Cinematography: A. V. Krishna Kumar
- Edited by: P. R. Soundar Raj
- Music by: Hamsalekha
- Production company: Sandesh Enterprises
- Release date: 10 December 1999
- Country: India
- Language: Kannada

Arunodaya (transl. Sunrise) is a 1999 Indian Kannada-language romantic drama film directed by P. H. Vishwanath and starring Ramesh Aravind, Vijayalakshmi and Shilpa. The plot of the film is similar to Premotsava (1999), which released prior to this film. The film was a box office success.

== Cast ==
- Ramesh Aravind as Mohan
- Vijayalakshmi as Shanthi
- Shilpa as Nirmala
- Sharan
- Padma Vasanthi

== Soundtrack ==
The music was composed by Hamsalekha, and the audio was released under the Anand Audio label. Latha Hamsalekha won the Karnataka State Film Award for Best Female Playback Singer.

Track listing
No.	Title	Singer(s)	Length
1.	"Busu Busu Nagappa"	K. S. Chithra	4:43
2.	"Aaha Arunodaya"	Latha Hamsalekha	4:59
3.	"Uyyale"	Rajesh Krishnan	4:31
4.	"Tantaka Tanatka"	Ramesh Chandra	4:58
5.	"Oh Ho Vayyara"	Ramesh Chandra, Archana	4:55
Total length:			24:16

== Reception ==
A critic from Online Bangalore wrote that "Director P. H. Vishwanath comes out with another winner in Arunodaya; a please all film which has all the ingredients required to make a competent and good film, and which at the same time retains some class" and called the film "a perfect viewing for Kannada film goers this year end". The critic praised the film's first half, actors' performances (particularly Vijayalakshmi's), music, photography, and dialogues while criticised the film's second half and called the climax "jarring and illogical". Vani Nagendrappa of Indiainfo wrote "It has a very light-hearted beginning, with comedy interwoven with the main plot. Ramesh is at his best. Vijayalakshmi's acting is very convincing and of course Shilpa's too. Arun's comical role is really praiseworthy. Some scenes in the second half could have been handled differently. Music scored by Hamsalekha is average".
