= Aryabhata (film) =

Indian Kannada-language drama film

- VCD cover
- Directed by: K.S.Ramanath
- Screenplay by: K.S.Ramanath
- Story by: Sujatha Rangarajan
- Dialogues by: Sujatha Rangarajan; K.S.Ramanath
- Produced by: A. S. Balu
- Starring: Ramesh Aravind; Soundarya
- Cinematography: B. C. Gowrishankar
- Edited by: Suresh Urs
- Music by: V. Manohar
- Production company: Ambale Arts
- Release date: 27 January 1999
- Running time: 135 minutes
- Country: India
- Language: Kannada

Aryabhata is a 1999 Indian Kannada-language drama film directed by K.S.Ramanath starring Ramesh Aravind and Soundarya. Though the plot twist was based on the 1954 movie Andha Naal, the title card credited the story to writer Sujatha.

== Premise ==
When Anand, a young successful scientist with humble background, is found mysteriously murdered, the case falls on the shoulders of CBI officer who retraces the life of the scientist from his struggling days leading up to the day he died and pins down three primary suspects - his maid, boss and wife's cousin.

== Cast ==
- Ramesh Aravind as Anand
- Soundarya as Bharathi
- Devaraj as CBI officer Riyaz
- Rangayana Raghu
- Girish Shetty
- Avinash
- Sudhakar Patil
- Bank Janardhan
- Mithun Tejasvi
- R. G. Vijayasarathy
- Ramya
- Bhagirathi
- Vinayak Joshi

== Reception ==
Srikanth of Deccan Herald wrote, "Director Ramanath has tried to provide justice to characterisation. But, he could have ensured a livelier presentation of the theme. The film is a sincere effort that lacks impact!"
