= Chippy Renjith =

Indian actress, producer

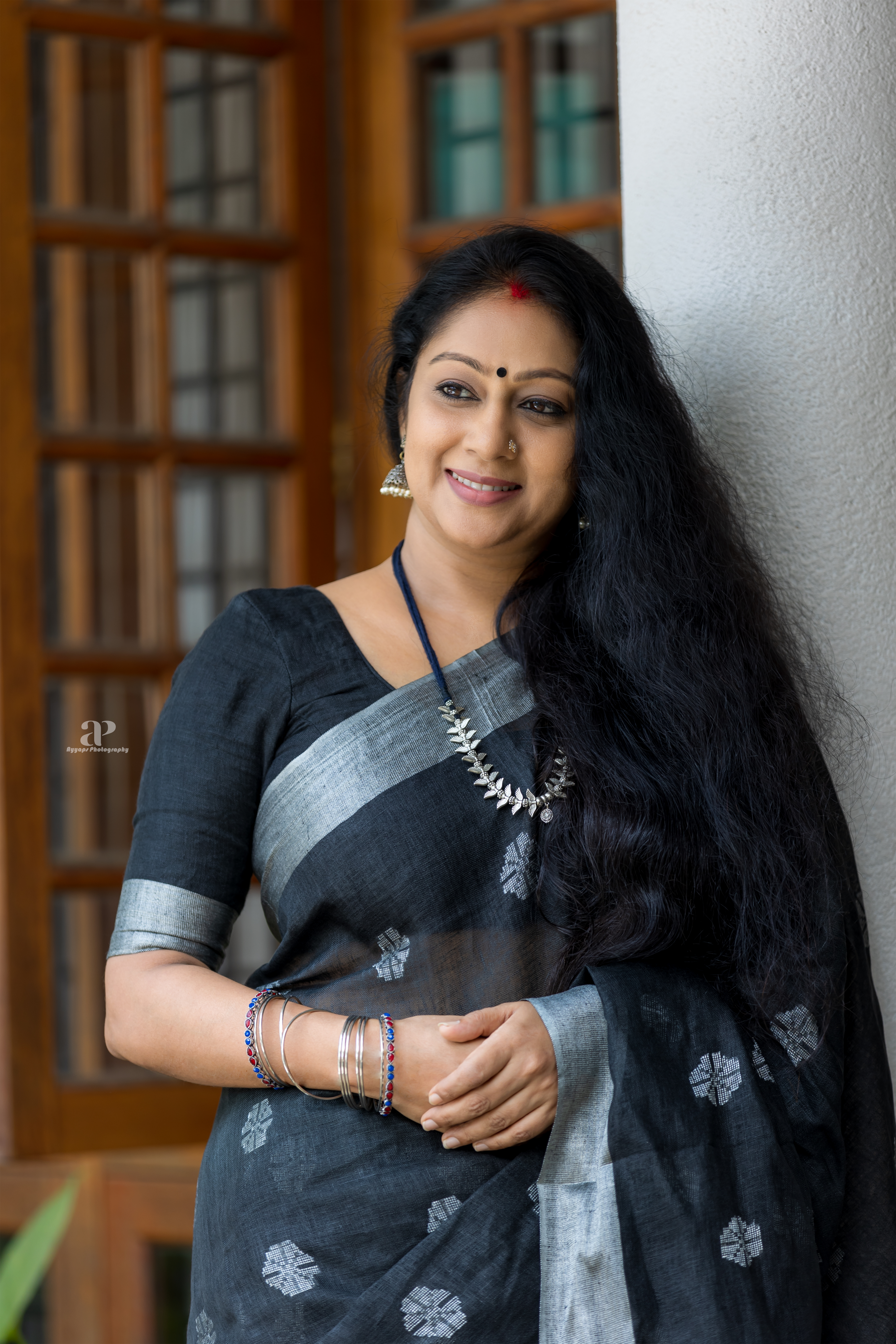
- Born: Divya Shaji; Thiruvananthapuram, Kerala, India
- Education: Mar Ivanios College, Thiruvananthapuram
- Occupations: Actress; producer
- Years active: 1992–present
- Spouse: M.Renjith
- Children: Avanthika

Divya Shaji, better known by her stage names Chippy and Shilpa in Malayalam and Kannada films respectively, is an Indian actress and producer who works in the South Indian film industry, primarily in Malayalam and Kannada films. She has won several accolades including the Filmfare Award for Best Kannada Actress & Karnataka State Film Award for Best Actress for her performance in Janumada Jodi (1996).

== Biography ==
She has acted in many Kannada superhit films such as Bhoomi Thayiya Chochchala Maga (1998), Mungarina Minchu (1997) and Idhu Entha Premavayya (1999). Shilpa and Ramesh Aravind pair is considered as one of the best onscreen pairs in Kannada cinema. Her best known works in Malayalam-language films include sister of Aadu Thoma (Mohanlal) in Spadikam and Chandradas's (Mammootty) estranged daughter in Patheyam.

She has also acted in several Malayalam Superhit TV series and her notable works include Sthreejanmam, Sthree oru Santhwanam, Sreeguruvayoorappan, Aakashadoothu and Santhwanam.

== Career ==
Chippy made her film debut with the Bharathan directorial Padheyam in 1993, co-starring Mammootty. She has acted in several Malayalam films in supporting roles and a few lead roles. In 1995, she acted as the sister of the iconic goon Aadu Thoma in the film Spadikam starring Mohanlal. Later she debuted as Shilpa in Kannada cinema through the 1996 Kannada film, Janumada Jodi, which broke many records in the Kannada film industry and screened for five hundred days. She received the Karnataka State Film Award for Best Actress award from the Government of Karnataka for her role portrayal in the same film establishing herself as a lead actress in the Kannada cinema. Post marriage she shifted her focus into Malayalam television serials. She played Mayamma in Sthreejanam. Later she launched her own production house, Avanthika Creations, a subsidiary of her husband M.Renjith's film production company Rejaputhra Visual Media. She produced and played lead roles in Malayalam serials Akashadoothu, Vanambadi, Santhwanam and in Tamil serials Mouna Raagam and Mouna Raagam 2. In 2026, she made her comeback to films after a gap of almost 25 years through Malayalam film Thudakkam.

== Personal life ==
Chippy was born as Divya to Shaji Dharmapal and Thankam Shaji at Thiruvananthapuram, Kerala. Chippy has a sister, Drishya. She was educated at Nirmala Bhavan Higher Secondary School, Thiruvananthapuram and at Mar Ivanios College, Thiruvananthapuram. Chippy is married to M. Renjith, a film and television producer who runs Rejaputhra Visual Media. The couple have a daughter Avanthika.

== Filmography ==
=== Malayalam ===
List of Chippy Renjith Malayalam film credits
| Year | Title | Role | Notes |
|---|---|---|---|
| 1993 | Sopanam | Anju Varma | |
| 1993 | Padheyam | Haritha Menon | |
| 1994 | Harichandanam | | |
| 1994 | Vendor Daniel State Licency | Seetha | |
| 1994 | CID Unnikrishnan B.A., B.Ed. | Damayanthi | |
| 1994 | Santhanagopalam | Ammini | |
| 1994 | Puthran | Lekha | |
| 1995 | Sundari Neeyum Sundaran Njanum | Shobha | |
| 1995 | Spadikam | Jancy Chacko | |
| 1995 | No. 1 Snehatheeram Bangalore North | Sindhu | |
| 1995 | Achan Kombathu Amma Varampathu | Radhika | |
| 1995 | Sargavasantham | Abhirami | |
| 1995 | Prayikkara Pappan | Radha | |
| 1995 | Indian Military Intelligence | Sreedevi Varma | |
| 1995 | Minnaminuginum Minnukettu | Indira | |
| 1995 | Kusruthikaatu | Ganga | |
| 1995 | Kakkakkum Poochakkum Kalyanam | Shyamala | |
| 1995 | Aadyathe Kanmani | Hema | |
| 1995 | Mimics Action 500 | Sridevi/Souparnika Thampuratti | |
| 1996 | Padanayakan | Sreedevi | |
| 1996 | Kaathil Oru Kinnaram | Varsha | |
| 1996 | Kalyana Sougandhikam | Vasumathi | |
| 1996 | Devaraagam | Rukku | |
| 1996 | Harbour | Sophie | |
| 1996 | Ee Puzhayum Kadannu | Aarathi | |
| 1996 | Hitler | Thulasi | |
| 1997 | Asuravamsam | Gayathri | |
| 1998 | Poothiruvathira Ravil | Radha | |
| 1998 | Achaammakkuttiyude Achaayan | Mereena | |
| 1998 | Inspector Eeswara Iyer Green Roomilundu | | |
| 1998 | Aaram Jaalakam | | |
| 2000 | Kattu Vannu Vilichappol | Seetha | |
| 2026 | Thudakkam | Meenu's mother | |

=== Kannada ===
List of Chippy Renjith Kannada film credits
| Year | Title | Role | Notes |
|---|---|---|---|
| 1996 | Janumada Jodi | Kanaka | Filmfare Award for Best Actress – Kannada; Karnataka State Film Award for Best Actress |
| 1997 | Kalyani | Kalyani | |
| 1997 | Muddina Kanmani | Hema | |
| 1997 | Lakshmi Mahalakshmi | Lakshmi | |
| 1997 | Vimochane | Sumathi | |
| 1997 | Mungarina Minchu | Indu | |
| 1997 | Chikka | Kasthuri | |
| 1998 | Suvvi Suvvalali | Chandana | |
| 1998 | Bisi Raktha | | |
| 1998 | Bhoomi Thayiya Chochchala Maga | Nilambika | |
| 1998 | Megha Banthu Megha | Vedha | |
| 1999 | Premachaari | Gowri | |
| 1999 | Arunodaya | Nirmala | |
| 1999 | Naanenu Madlilla | Puttathayi | |
| 1999 | Idu Entha Premavayya | Apoorva | |
| 2000 | Khadga | Jhanvi | |
| 2002 | Dharma Devathe | Bheema | |
| 2004 | Pandava | Anasooya | |

=== Tamil ===
- Dharma (1998), Geetha

=== Telugu ===
- Pelli Peetalu (1998), Aswini

== Television career ==
As an actress

List of Chippy Renjith television credits as an actress
| Year | Title | Role | Channel | language | Notes |
|---|---|---|---|---|---|
| 2002–2003 | Sthree Janmam | Mayamma | Surya TV | Malayalam | Television debut |
| 2003–2004 | Sthree oru Santhwanam | Seetha | Asianet | Malayalam | |
| 2006-2007 | mazhamegha pravukal | seetha | Surya TV | Malayalam | |
| 2005 | Nokketha Doorath | | Asianet | Malayalam | |
| 2005-2006 | Pavithra Bandham | seetha | | Malayalam | |
| 2006 | Amma Manassu | Isa | Asianet | Malayalam | |
| 2007–2008 | Sree Guruvayoorappan | Gauri Antharjanam a.k.a. Kururamma | Surya TV | Malayalam | |
| 2007 | Mizhiyoram | | Kerala Vision/Surya TV | Malayalam | |
| 2008 | Aliyanmarum Penganmarum | Amritha Vijayan | Amrita TV | Malayalam | |
| 2009 | Adiparasakthi Chottanikkarayamma | Devotee | Surya TV | Malayalam | Cameo Appearance in the title song |
| 2011–2013 | Akashadoothu | Meenu | Surya TV | Malayalam | Also producer |
| 2011 | Sreekrishnan | Yashoda | Surya TV | Malayalam | |
| 2017–2020 | Vanambadi | Nandini | Asianet | Malayalam | Also Producer |
| 2017-2020 | Mouna Raagam | Mallika / Karpagam | Star Vijay | Tamil | Also producer |
| 2020– 2024 | Santhwanam | Sreedevi Balakrishnan a.k.a. Devi | Asianet | Malayalam | Also Producer |
| 2021–2023 | Mouna Raagam 2 | Mallika | Star Vijay | Tamil | Also producer |
| 2022 | Bharatidasan Colony | —N/a | Star Vijay | Tamil | producer |

As a Judge

- Junior Idol (Jaihind)
- Comedy Stars (Asianet)
- Super Dancer Junior 5 (Amrita TV)
- Red Carpet (Amrita TV) – Mentor

As a Guest

- Flowers oru kodi
- Tharapakittu
- Thiranottam

As a Reality show contestant

- Ningalkkum Aakaam Kodeeshwaran – 2017

== Awards ==
List of Chippy Renjith awards
| Year | Ceremony | Category | Film/serial | Result |
|---|---|---|---|---|
| 1996 | Karnataka State Film Awards | Karnataka State Film Award for Best Actress | Janumada Jodi | Won |
| 1996 | Filmfare Award | Filmfare Award for Best Actress – Kannada | Janumada Jodi | Won |
| 2005 | Asianet Television Awards | Best daughter | Sthree oru Santhwanam | Won |
| 2017 | Asianet Television Awards | Best Actress | Vanambadi | Won |
| 2017 | Asianet Television Awards | Best Serial | Vanambadi | Won |
| 2018 | Asianet Television Awards | Most Popular Serial | Vanambadi | Won |
| 2019 | Asianet Television Awards | Best Serial | Vanambadi | Won |
| 2022 | Asianet Television Awards | Best serial | Santhwanam | Won |
| 2022 | Asianet Television Awards | Best actress | Santhwanam | Won |
