= Karnataka Police (film) =

- Directed by: J. G. Krishna
- Screenplay by: J. G. Krishna
- Story by: R. Shivashankar; Sriranga
- Produced by: Praveen Kumar
- Starring: Devaraj; Bhanu Chander
- Edited by: S. Prasad
- Music by: Sadhu Kokila
- Release date: November 27, 1998
- Country: India
- Language: Kannada

Karnataka Police is a 1998 Indian Kannada-language drama film directed by J. G. Krishna and starring Devaraj and Bhanu Chander.

== Cast ==
- Devaraj as Hemanth
- Bhanu Chander as Prashanth
- Avinash as Captain
- Bhavyasri Rai
- Yamini
- Padma Vasanthi
- Shivaram
- M. V. Vasudeva Rao
- Shani Mahadevappa
- H. G. Dattatreya
- Shobaraj
- Thalapathy Dinesh
- Bank Janardhan

== Soundtrack ==
The music was composed by Sadhu Kokila and released under the Lahari Music label.

All lyrics are written by Sriranga and K. Kalyan.

Track listing
No.	Title	Singer(s)	Length
1.	"Kaateri Maateri"	Rajesh Krishnan	3:46
2.	"Hare Ram Hare Ram"	L. N. Shastri	4:47
3.	"Juggu Juggu"	Rajesh Krishnan, Sujata Dutt	4:09
4.	"Ee Preethige Onde Lekka"	L. N. Shastri, Sujata Dutt	3:12
Total length:			15:54

== Reception ==
A critic from The Indian Express wrote that "WITH a name like this, one would assume that the director would have some basic knowledge about the Karnataka police, which has sacrificed a number of daredevil cops in combing operations. He does not". A critic from Deccan Herald wrote that "What should have been a tribute to the Karnataka Police force turns out to be neither a tribute nor does it create any impact on the audience. Film-makers do not seem to be tired of trying out the same old formula".
