= Zulfi Syed =

Indian model and actor

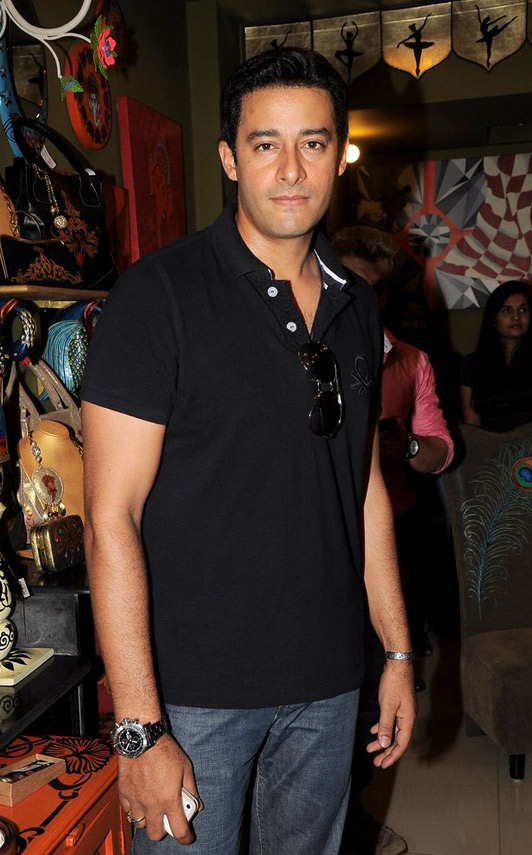
- Syed in 2013
- Born: Bengaluru, Karnataka, India
- Occupations: Model, actor
- Years active: 1997–2010

Zulfi Syed also known as Zulfikar Syed is an Indian model and actor. Syed Zulfi is a former winner of Gladrags Manhunt Contest. He was a contestant in Bigg Boss.

== Biography ==
Syed was first noticed when he won Gladrags Manhunt contest in the year 1996. He was more recognized for his ad where girls leave lipstick marks all over his body. His wistful, sensuous eyes, finely chiselled face and a well-sculpted body has made him a ramp favourite. His famous ad campaigns are Raymond's, Fiesta condoms, Trevi jeans, Warehouse, Levis etc. He has also acted in music videos like Chahat Desh Se Anewale, Buleyaa, Dhuwa Dhuwa Ho Raha Hai Sama, Tere Khayalon Mein etc. He made his movie debut in the 1997 Kannada film O Mallige, which received positive response from the audience as well as critics and became highest grosser of the year. He also performed Prince Khurram's role in the mega budget film Taj Mahal (2005).

In 2008, he appeared in the second season of Bigg Boss, the Indian version of Big Brother as a housemate. He was the second runner-up. He made an appearance for his fellow inmate from Bigg Boss (Season 2), Rahul Mahajan's Swayamvar named Rahul Dulhaniya Le Jayega on NDTV Imagine.

== Filmography ==
Year	Film	Role
1997	O Mallige	Nacchi
2002	Pyaasa	Prem
2003	Chupke Se	Varun
2004	Wajahh: A Reason To Kill	Raj
2004	Billu	
2005	Taj Mahal: An Eternal Love Story	Young Prince Khurram/Emperor Shah Jahan
2005	Dhadkan	
2007	Mr. Hot Mr. Kool	Lakshman 'Lucky' Prasad
2007	O Meri Kangna	
2008	Deshdrohi	Inspector Rohit Raghav
2008	Jimmy	Rejected Person

Year	Television	Role
2008	Bigg Boss 2	Himself
2010	Rahul Dulhaniya Le Jayega	Himself
