= O Mallige =

- DVD cover
- Directed by: V. Manohar
- Written by: Ramesh Rao (dialogues)
- Screenplay by: K. Nanjunda
- Story by: K. Ananthu
- Produced by: Meera S. Naika
- Starring: Ramesh Aravind; Charulatha; Zulfi Syed
- Cinematography: Ashok Kashyap
- Edited by: Prasad
- Music by: V. Manohar
- Production company: Sri Siddhivinayaka Arts
- Release date: 22 April 1997
- Running time: 147 minutes
- Country: India
- Language: Kannada

O Mallige is a 1997 Indian Kannada-language romance drama film directed by V. Manohar and written by K. Ananthu. The film stars Ramesh Aravind, Charulatha, model-turned-actor Zulfi Syed and Chaitali (Bina Rajagopal). Syed was credited as Amar Mayur in the film.

The film, upon release met with very good positive response at the box-office and critics as well. It was one of the highest-grossing films of the year 1997. Singer S. P. Balasubrahmanyam was awarded the Karnataka State Film Award for Best Male Playback Singer for his rendition of a song, actor Ramesh fetched the Best Actor award and Chaitali won the best supporting actress award at the Udaya Film Awards. Sadhu Kokila's character of Musthafa was later used in 2013 movie Googly.

== Plot ==
Mallige (Charulata) lives in a small village with her uncle (V.Manohar). A heart patient, Manohar has an ambitious wannabe model in his son Nacchi (Zulfi Syed) who is lost in the bliss of the big city. When he suffers another nearly fatal stroke, Nacchi reluctantly returns to be by his dying father's side. Seizing the opportunity, the dying man manages to get the innocent village belle Mallige married to the city chap, Nacchi. As much as Nacchi hates the decision, he goes along considering his father's health. He even manages to consummate the wedlock under the influence of alcohol. A few days later the old man dies leaving the helpless girl to his son. The very next day Nacchi leaves her; she has nowhere to turn to for support.

Days roll by and soon Mallige realizes she is expecting a baby. To take things under her own control she decides to join her absconding husband in the city. Nachi changing his name to Naresh Patel has shifted base to the city and is shown wooing the rich daughter (Chaitali) of a millionaire (Avinash) to fuel his aspirations of becoming a successful model. Soon the young couple is shown exchanging sweet nothings in parks and restaurants while the pregnant girl is roaming the streets of the city looking for her ignorant husband.

Krishna Murthy alias Kitti (Ramesh) is also an aspiring model who is in between odd jobs. An accident brings Kitti and Mallige together as she is seriously injured in the mishap and loses all memory of her immediate past. For his convenience, to shoo off the prying landlords, Kitti brings Mallige to his house and christens her Lakshmi since she has no memory of her name. A special bond of affection starts forming between the two. Nacchi continues his casanova ways with the rich girl unaware of any of these happenings.

Lakshmi bears a child and names him Ganesha. Meanwhile, Kitti manages to get a plum offer from the same firm that works with Mallige's husband. Soon Nacchi has his girlfriend realise that he is married and so starts encouraging Kitti instead to get back at him. Nacchi confronts her and ends up apologizing for his “mistake” but she is firm in her decision and decides not to have anything to do with him.

Things start falling into place when she sees Mallige at Kitti's place and informs him about the truth. Kitti is heartbroken at the thought of losing Mallige to a stranger. She has been his life for the past few years and this sudden change of events scares him. Nacchi meets his long lost wife in Kitti's house and confronts him to return her to him. In the end, Mallige's memory has revived but pretending to be losing her memory again (fact known only to the doctor) she does not recognize Nacchi and ends up uniting with Kitty.

== Cast ==
- Ramesh Arvind as Kitty (Krishnamurthy)
- Charulatha as Mallige (Lakshmi)
- Zulfi Syed as Nacchi (Narasimhamurthy) alias Naresh Patel
- Chaithali as Karishma
- Ashok
- Avinash
- V. Manohar
- Sadhu Kokila as Musthafa
- Vaijanath Biradar as Tippayya
- M. N. Lakshmi Devi
- Ramesh rao as Yenka
- Rathnakar
- Master Santhosh
- Srinivas Prabhu

== Production ==
Composer V. Manohar originally entered the film industry to become a director but accidentally became a composer. When he decided to make his directorial debut, Ramesh Aravind took him to writer Ananthu who provided him a story which eventually became O Mallige.

== Soundtrack ==
All the songs are composed and written by V. Manohar. The opening tune of the song "Sura Sundara" was re-used in the Hindi song "Dance Basanti" from the 2014 movie Ungli.

Sl No	Song title	Singer(s)	Lyrics
1	"Sevanthi Sevanthi"	Rajesh Krishnan, K. S. Chithra	V. Manohar
2	"O Seethakka"	B. R. Chaya, Sujatha Dutt	V. Manohar
3	"O Mallige Ninnade"	K.S. Chithra	V. Manohar
4	"Sura Sundara"	Rajesh Krishnan, Sowmya Raoh	V. Manohar
5	"Malagu Malagu"	Ramesh Chandra	V. Manohar
6	"Hoodotakkeega"	Narasimha Nayak	V. Manohar
7	"Muddada Baale"	S. P. Balasubrahmanyam	V. Manohar
8	"Giri Siri Nela Hola"	S. P. Balasubrahmanyam	V. Manohar

== Awards ==
- Karnataka State Film Awards
1. Karnataka State Film Award for Best Male Playback Singer - S. P. Balasubrahmanyam
- Udaya Film Awards
1. Best Actor - Ramesh Aravind
2. Best Supporting Actress - Chaitali
3. Best Male Playback Singer - Rajesh Krishnan
