= Astra (2000 film) =

Indian action drama film

- Directed by: Anand P. Raju
- Written by: M S Ramesh (dialogue)
- Screenplay by: Anand P. Raju
- Story by: Gurudutt
- Produced by: Lalitha Jayasimha Musuri
- Starring: Devaraj; B. C. Patil; Ragasudha; Chaithali
- Cinematography: Manohar C
- Edited by: K Narasayya
- Music by: Hamsalekha
- Production company: Musuri Enterprises
- Release date: 4 July 2000
- Country: India
- Language: Kannada

Astra (transl. Weapon) is a 2000 Indian Kannada-language action drama film directed by Anand P. Raju and starring Devaraj, B. C. Patil, Ragasudha and Chaithali. The film was released to mixed reviews.

== Plot ==
Sharath is an electrical engineer. His wife Dr. Varsha is gang raped and killed in her own operation theatre for providing proof in a rape case. Sharath hunts down the killers and succeeds in killing two of them while the third, Sandeep Rai is a difficult target as his brothers Dayananda Rai and Basavaraj Patil are politically influential. One day, Sharath is caught by Inspector Dhananjay and sentenced to life imprisonment. However, he is released than due because of his good deeds.

Sharath devises methods to get back at his enemies and in his mission he is assisted by a so-called social worker Bharathi Devi. However, he soon realizes her motive of and unites with Inspector Dhananjay to hold the criminals accountable for their actions.

== Cast ==
- Devaraj as Sharath
- B. C. Patil as Inspector Dhananjay
- Ragasudha
- Chaithali as Dr. Varsha
- Pramila Joshai as Bharathi Devi
- Jai Jagadish as Dayananda Rai
- Aravind as Basavaraj Patil
- Sudheer
- Bank Janardhan
- M. S. Umesh

== Production ==
The stunts were choreographed by Kaurava Venkatesh.

== Reception ==
A critic from Chitraloka.com wrote that "If you are an action lover, got the time to spare three hours you may certainly go and watch this film". A critic from indiainfo.com wrote that "Astra is one of those mediocre films which at best provides some thrills for action lovers. The two action stars Devraj and B C Patil come together in this run-of-the-mill vengeance saga".
