= Bhoomi Thayiya Chochchala Maga =

- DVD cover
- Directed by: Rajendra Singh Babu
- Written by: Rajendra Singh Babu
- Produced by: Jai Jagadish; Dushyanth Singh
- Starring: Shiva Rajkumar; Ramesh Aravind; Vijayalakshmi
- Cinematography: B. C. Gowrishankar
- Edited by: Suresh Urs
- Music by: V. Manohar
- Production company: Vaibhavalakshmi Productions
- Release date: 18 September 1998
- Running time: 144 minutes
- Country: India
- Language: Kannada

Bhoomi Thayiya Chochchala Maga (transl. Motherland's First Son) is a 1998 Indian Kannada-language drama film directed and written by Rajendra Singh Babu. It features Shiva Rajkumar and Ramesh Aravind along with Vijayalakshmi and Shilpa in other pivotal roles. The film featured an original score and soundtrack composed and written by V. Manohar.

The film is about the suicides of farmers in Karnataka, and it won several laurels and awards upon release including the Karnataka State Film Awards.

Lokesh's character was inspired by Dashrath Manjhi, who cut a rocky hill for 22 years to build a road in memory of his dead wife. However, in the film, instead of building a road through a mountain, the character dismantles a mountain piece-by-piece to build a dam.

== Cast ==
- Shiva Rajkumar as Karna
- Ramesh Aravind as Bharath Kumar
- Vijayalakshmi as Sapna Sagar
- Shilpa as Nilambika
- Sabyasachi Chakrabarty as Channabasappa
- Lokesh as Kallanna
- Rangayana Raghu as Patil
- Girija Lokesh as a villager
- Shankar Ashwath as Gurubasya
- Karibasavaiah as villager
- M. V. Vasudeva Rao as C. S. Narasimha Murthy
- G. K. Govinda Rao as Chief Minister
- Honnavalli Krishna as Krishna

== Soundtrack ==
The music was composed by V. Manohar.

Track listing
No.	Title	Lyrics	Singer(s)	Length
1.	"Nesara Nesara"	V. Manohar	K. S. Chithra
2.	"Sa Pa Ni Sa"	V. Manohar	Rajesh Krishnan
3.	"Le Le Le Le"	V. Manohar	Rajesh Krishnan, K. S. Chithra, Ramesh Chandra
4.	"Bhoomi Thayiya"	Da Ra Bendre	Rajkumar
5.	"Naa Preethiya Huduga"	V. Manohar	Rajesh Krishnan, Sowmya Raoh
6.	"Jhumka Jhumka"	V. Manohar	Rajesh Krishnan, Sowmya Raoh

== Reception ==
Srikanth Srinivasa of Deccan Herald felt the film was inspired by two events: "the recent spate of farmers' suicides in North Karnataka due to crop failure" and Kannada poet D. R. Bendre's poem with the same title as the film. Calling Shiva Rajkumar's performance his "best... till date", he wrote, "Shivanna is restrained and collected and delivers his dialogues effectively." He added, "Ramesh is superb. Vijayalakshmi, as the new, chirpy young thing, has performed well in the small and meaty role. Shilpa is good, as usual. Veteran Bengali actor Sabi Sachi steals the show." He commended the music and the film's soundtrack, while singling out Rajkumar's "soulful rendering of Bendre's title song" in that it "evokes a lot of sympathies while delving into the plight of the farmers overburdened by huge debts besides struggling for their daily existence." While he felt that the film could have been edited and trimmed by 15 to 20 minutes, "it provides good entertainment fare for the viewer."

== Awards ==
1998–99 Karnataka State Film Awards

- Special Film of Social Concern
- Best Story Writer – Rajendra Singh Babu
- Best Dialogue Writer – S. Surendranath
