= Bhoomi (2000 film) =

- Directed by: Gandharva
- Written by: Dr. Madeva Bharani (dialogue)
- Screenplay by: Dr. Madeva Bharani
- Story by: Dr. Madeva Bharani
- Produced by: K M Eshwar Chandra; Pokuri Shiva Prasad; Ma Vivek Bharani
- Starring: Devaraj; Charulatha
- Cinematography: V. K. Kannan
- Edited by: Victor Yadav
- Music by: Gandharva
- Production company: Bhuvi Creations
- Release date: 16 June 2000
- Running time: 135 minutes
- Country: India
- Language: Kannada

Bhoomi (transl. Earth) is a 2000 Indian Kannada-language drama film directed by Gandharva. The film stars Devaraj and Charulatha. The film revolves around Bhoomi, the daughter of a priest, who falls in love with Kathla, who belongs to a lower caste. When the society opposes their love, they try to fight against all odds to unite.

== Plot ==
Bhoomi is the only daughter of an orthodox Brahmin of the village, Madhwacharya. Vishnubhat is another Brahmin belonging to a different sect, who wants to settle scores with Madhwacharya. Kesava, son of Madhwacharya is a modern youth and is against the orthodoxy. But he loves his sister Bhoomi very much. Though Bhoomi is of a very dominating nature, her love for dalits is unquestionable.

An unexpected incident leads to the blossoming of love between Bhoomi and the village drummer Kathla. Meanwhile Bhoomi becomes pregnant also. Coming to know that his daughter is pregnant, Madhwacharya, wants to separate her from Kathla, but fails. Then he along with Kathla’s father tries to abort the pregnancy of Bhoomi, but there also he fails. And the conflict goes on.

== Cast ==
- Devaraj as Kathla
- Charulatha as Bhoomi
- Loknath as Madhwacharya
- Shankar Ashwath as Kesava
- HMT Ananthu as Vishnu Bhatta
- Karibasavaiah
- Krishnegowda
- Killer Venkatesh

== Music ==
The music was composed by director Gandharva also who also penned lyrics for all six songs.

Track listing
No.	Title	Singer(s)	Length
1.	"Suttha Eluralli"	S. P. Balasubrahmanyam
2.	"Kogile Ku Ku"	Manjula Gururaj
3.	"Maalige Maneya"	Rajesh Krishnan
4.	"Kalyan Kalyana"	Manjula Gururaj
5.	"Elu Saagaradaache"	S. P. Balasubrahmanyam
6.	"Manadaage"	Shashikala

== Reception ==
A reviewer from Sify noted that "The director seems to have been confused here - whether to make it an art film or a commercial one. The subject he has chosen is that of the former, while the cast he had selected belong to commercial films" and concluded that "One or two songs by music director Gandharva and a few dialogues by Maadeva Bharani are worth mentioning".

A reviewer from indiainfo.com rated the film two out of five stars and wrote that "Once again targeting the Brahmin orthodoxy is Bhoomi, the debut film of Dr Mahadeva Bharani as director and storywriter. However, the film drags no end and predictably at that".

A reviewer from go4i wrote "Sadly, the pace is ponderous, the narration is nonsensical, performances awful and the story ancient. [..] Debutante director Gandharva has turned the eternal tale of clashes between the upper caste and the lower caste into a circus. That he lacks a cinematic vision of any kind is clear from this film".
