= Maduve =

- Directed by: V. Umakanth
- Screenplay by: V. Umakanth
- Story by: Srinivaasa Chakravarthy
- Based on: Pelli (Telugu)
- Produced by: N. Ramalingeshwara Rao
- Starring: Ramesh Aravind; Charulatha; Kumar Govind
- Cinematography: Sundarnath Suvarna
- Edited by: S. Prasad
- Music by: S. A. Rajkumar
- Production company: Ramprasad Art Pictures
- Release date: 18 June 1997
- Running time: 129 minutes
- Country: India
- Language: Kannada

Maduve (transl. Marriage) is a 1997 Indian Kannada-language romantic thriller film directed by V. Umakanth. It was made in parallel with Telugu film Pelli and released following Maduve. Ramesh Aravind and Charulatha are in the lead roles; Kumar Govind, Lakshmi, Ramesh Bhat and Umashree are in supporting roles.

Maduve released on 18 June 1997. It received positive reviews and became a commercial success.

== Plot ==
Ramesh lives with his grandmother Lakshmi in Mysore and says that he would marry the girl he likes at first sight. He goes to Bangalore after getting a job as a bank manager there. In a shopping mall, he gets a glimpse of Divya and falls in love with her. He identifies her scooter model and goes on a mission to find her, ending up in a colony surrounded by comedians. The colony people mistakenly think that Ramesh is trying to steal the scooter, and therefore, he lied that he was looking for a house to rent. Then, he agrees to stay in the colony after confirming that Divya and her mother Janaki are living there.

From then on, Ramesh tries to impress Divya. The comedians find out that Ramesh is trying to approach Divya and agree to help him. They ask Janaki's opinion about Divya's marriage. However, Divya refused the offer, saying that she is not interested in getting married. A lonely, sad, pathetic-looking Janaki seemed to hide something. The gang gives a few ideas to persuade Divya, but they all fail. Eventually, tired of foolish ideas, Jeeva tells Janaki that he wants to marry her daughter. Impressed by Ramesh's good manners, Janaki advises Divya to accept him. True to the expectations, Divya reveals that Janaki is actually her mother-in-law.

Knowing that Ramesh loves her, Divya insults him so that he would give up, but he does not. Every time Jeeva does well to Divya, it reminds her of her ex-husband Prithvi's cruelty, and she begins to compare both men. In a dramatic flashback, Prithvi is killed (allegedly) by Divya when he encourages his friends to sexually abuse her. Believing that the bad time is behind them, Janaki and Divya start a new life in a new town as a mother-daughter team. Divya falls in love with Ramesh with the comedians' help. However, Janaki did not allow Divya to tell Ramesh about her past. The entire colony cheers the news, and they arranged an engagement.

Prithvi returns for their betrothal to reclaim his possession. He blackmails Divya to sleep with him the night before her marriage and asks Jeeva to sanction him a loan of Rs. 25 lakhs; otherwise, he will reveal the truth to everyone. Somehow, Ramesh knows the truth and claims to be proud to become Divya's husband. This distracts Prithvi, who then decides to stop the marriage. Wanting to stop Prithvi from doing so, Janaki poisons him and also herself for the sake of a peaceful life for her daughter-in-law.

== Cast ==
- Ramesh Aravind as Ramesh
- Charulatha as Divya, Prithvi's wife
- Lakshmi as Janaki, Prithvi’s mother
- Kumar Govind as Prithvi
- Ramesh Bhat as Major Poovaiah
- Bank Janardhan
- R. G. Vijayasarathy
- Umashree as Chamundeshwari
- Jyothi
- M. N. Lakshmi Devi as Lakshmi, Ramesh's grandmother

== Soundtrack ==
The soundtrack was composed by S. A. Rajkumar (who reused the songs from the original), with lyrics by V. Manohar.

Track listing
No.	Title	Singer(s)	Length
1.	"Aaha Idu Thunta Seragidu"	S. P. Balasubrahmanyam, K. S. Chithra	4:53
2.	"Anuragada Sangamavo"	Dr. Rajkumar	4:19
3.	"Hunnimeye Ninge Innu Kopave"	S. P. Balasubrahmanyam	3:53
4.	"O Ambara Thaare"	S. P. Balasubrahmanyam	4:32
5.	"Siri Siri Sampige"	Mano	4:24
6.	"Thugu Thugu Uyyale"	S. P. Balasubrahmanyam, K. S. Chithra	4:29
Total length:			26:30
