= Mungarina Minchu =

- Directed by: Rajendra Singh Babu
- Screenplay by: Rajendra Singh Babu
- Based on: A Walk in the Clouds
- Produced by: Jai Jagadish; R. Dushyanth Singh
- Starring: Ramesh Arvind; Suman Nagarkar; Shilpa; Lokesh; Srinivasa Murthy
- Cinematography: B. C. Gowrishankar
- Edited by: Suresh Urs
- Music by: V. Manohar
- Distributed by: Vaibhavalakshmi Productions
- Release date: 24 October 1997
- Running time: 151 minutes
- Country: India
- Language: Kannada

Mungarina Minchu (transl. Thunder of the Monsoon) is a 1997 Indian Kannada language romantic drama film directed and written by Rajendra Singh Babu starring Ramesh Aravind, Shilpa and Suman Nagarkar. The film is inspired from the 1942 Italian film Quattro passi fra le nuvole (Four Steps in the Clouds) and its 1995 American remake A Walk in the Clouds. The music was composed by V. Manohar. The film was considered one of the best movies by Rajendra Singh Babu.

The film was awarded the Best Feature Film in Kannada at the 45th National Film Awards.

== Cast ==
- Ramesh Aravind as Chethan
- Shilpa as Indu
- Suman Nagarkar as Varsha
- Lokesh as Ajja, Indu's grandfather
- B. Jayamma as Ajji, Indu's grandmother
- Srinivasa Murthy as Annappa, Indu's father
- Jayalakshmi as Varsha's aunty
- Padma Kumata as Indu's mother
- Karibasavaiah as Ajja's servant

== Soundtrack ==
All the songs are composed and written by V. Manohar.

Sl No	Song title	Singer(s)	Lyrics
1	"Silence Silence Ella Silence"	Rajesh Krishnan, K. S. Chithra	V. Manohar
2	"Deepavalige Thotad Manege"	Rajesh Krishnan, Sowmya, Chandrika	V. Manohar
3	"Saki Shakunthala Chintheli Kunthala"	Rajesh Krishnan, C. Ashwath	V. Manohar
4	"Hrudayada Anchinali Mungarina Minchu"	Rajesh Krishnan, K. S. Chithra	V. Manohar
5	"Vasanthadalli Santhanaga Beda"	Rajesh Krishnan, Suma Shastry	V. Manohar

== Release ==
Due to the back-to-back releases of the Hindi films Dil To Pagal Hai, Ghulam-E-Musthafa, and Bhai along with the mishandling of Mysore theatres which were screening Mommaga, Mungarina Minchu was not released in the Mysore, Hassan, Kodagu, and Mandya districts.

== Legacy ==
In a write-up from 2020, a writer from Deccan Herald opined that Ramesh Aravind "played his roles to a T in complex dramas like Mungarina Minchu (1997), Hoomale (1998) and Chandramukhi Pranasakhi (1999)".
