= Jodi Hakki (film) =

- Theatrical release poster
- Directed by: D. Rajendra Babu
- Written by: Baraguru Ramachandrappa (dialogues)
- Screenplay by: D. Rajendra Babu
- Produced by: P. Dhanraj
- Starring: Shiva Rajkumar; Charulatha; Vijayalakshmi
- Cinematography: Ramesh Babu
- Edited by: Shashikumar
- Music by: V. Manohar
- Production company: Om Sri Guru Raghavendra Productions
- Release date: 5 September 1997
- Running time: 142 minutes
- Country: India
- Language: Kannada

Jodi Hakki (transl. Pair Birds) is a 1997 Indian Kannada-language musical romance film written and directed by D. Rajendra Babu, produced by P. Dhanraj and starring Shiva Rajkumar, Vijayalakshmi and Charulatha.

The film received critical acclaim upon release and won two State awards for screenplay and music. The film has musical score by V. Manohar which is often considered to be one of his best compositions.

The film revolves around a nomadic tribal who unwillingly relocates to the city where he gains popularity as a singer but gets separated from his lover.

== Cast ==
- Shiva Rajkumar as Maacha/Manoj
- Vijayalakshmi
- Charulatha as Laali
- Harish Rai as Vikki
- Kishori Ballal
- Mandeep Roy
- Shani Mahadevappa
- Ashok Rao
- Manjunath Hegde
- Master Santhosh

== Soundtrack ==
The music of the film was composed and lyrics written by V. Manohar. Actor Rajkumar recorded a song "Hara Hara Gange" which became huge hit.

Jodi Hakki

Soundtrack album by V. Manohar
- Released: 1997
- Studio: Akash Audio (re-recorded at Prasad Recording Studio)
- Genre: Feature film soundtrack
- Length: 38:14
- Label: Akash Audio

V. Manohar chronology
Ee Hrudaya Ninagagi (1997)	Jodi Hakki (1997)	Ulta Palta (1997)

No.	Title	Lyrics	Singer(s)	Length
1.	"Laali Suvvali"	V. Manohar	L. N. Shastry	5:01
2.	"Kudure Eri"	V. Manohar	Rajesh Krishnan	5:13
3.	"Haadu Keli Haadu"	V. Manohar	Shiva Rajkumar	4:56
4.	"Jolly Jolly Day"	V. Manohar	Rajesh Krishnan	5:02
5.	"Neela Neela Neelambari"	V. Manohar	Rajesh Krishnan, K. S. Chithra	4:19
6.	"Namana Namana"	V. Manohar	Shankar Shanbag, K. S. Chithra	4:17
7.	"O Chandamama"	V. Manohar	Ramesh Chandra	4:12
8.	"Hara Hara Gange"	V. Manohar	Rajkumar	5:18
Total length:				38:14

== Awards ==
- Karnataka State Film Awards
1. Karnataka State Film Award for Best Screenplay – D. Rajendra Babu
2. Karnataka State Film Award for Best Music Director – V. Manohar
