= Kurubana Rani =

- Theatrical release poster
- Directed by: D. Rajendra Babu
- Written by: D. Rajendra Babu; V. Vijayendra Prasad; Baraguru Ramachandrappa
- Produced by: Rockline Venkatesh
- Starring: Shiva Rajkumar; Nagma; Hema Choudhary; Sumitra
- Cinematography: Ashok Kashyap
- Edited by: Shashikumar
- Music by: V. Manohar
- Production company: Rockline Productions
- Release date: 6 February 1998
- Running time: 155 minutes
- Country: India
- Language: Kannada

Kurubana Rani (transl. Shepherd's Queen) is a 1998 Indian Kannada-language film directed, written and scripted by D. Rajendra Babu, starring Shiva Rajkumar, Nagma and Hema Choudhary, Lokesh. The film was produced by Rockline Venkatesh under his home production, Rockline Studios.

== Plot ==
Kencha and Rani mutually agree to take part in a staged wedding ceremony. However, things take an unexpected turn after Kencha falls in love with Rani.

== Cast ==
- Shiva Rajkumar as Kencha
- Nagma as Rani
- Hema Choudhary
- Lokesh
- Mukhyamantri Chandru
- C. R. Simha
- Sumithra
- Sihi Kahi Chandru
- Lakshman
- Bank Janardhan
- Mandeep Roy

== Soundtrack ==
The music of the film was composed by V. Manohar. Actor Rajkumar recorded a song "Thaali Thaali", which was well received.

Kurubana Rani

Soundtrack album by V. Manohar
- Released: 1998
- Genre: Feature film soundtrack
- Label: Akash Audio

No.	Title	Lyrics	Singer(s)	Length
1.	"Yavvi Yaaravvi"	Doddarangegowda	Rajesh Krishnan
2.	"Kappe Chippu Neeralli"	K. Kalyan	Preeti Uttam Singh
3.	"Baare Baare"	K. Kalyan	Rajesh Krishnan
4.	"Banna Bannada"	K. Kalyan	Rajesh Krishnan, Preeti Uttam Singh
5.	"Mangalya Mangalya"	K. Kalyan	K. S. Chithra
6.	"Baravva Bhageerathi"	K. Kalyan	Rajesh Krishnan, K. S. Chithra
7.	"Thaali Thaali"	K. Kalyan	Rajkumar
