= Karibasavaiah =

Indian Kannada actor, comedian

- Born: 1959; Kodigehalli
- Died: 3 February 2012 (aged 52–53); Bangalore, India
- Notable work: Kotreshi Kanasu, Janumada Jodi, Galate Aliyandru, Mungarina Minchu, Yaarige Salute Sambala
- Spouse: Shanta

Karibasavaiah (1959 – 3 February 2012) was an Indian actor who appeared in Kannada cinema and a theatre personality. He has acted in over 120 films. He died on 3 February 2012 after a road traffic accident in Bangalore. He made his debut in the movie Undo Hodha, Kondu Hodha. Some of his memorable films are Kotreshi Kanasu, Janumada Jodi, Galate Aliyandru, Mungarina Minchu, Yaarige Salute Sambala, Police Story 2, and Ullasa Utsaha.

== Background ==
He was born in 1959 and belonged to a poor Kuruba Gowda family. As a child, he learnt Kuruba Gowda art forms like Kamsale, Dollu Kunitha and Harikathe. He worked as a lab assistant in a Seshadripuram college before entering film industry. He started acting in television serials beginning with Doddamane. Director Nagathihalli Chandrasekhar gave him the break in Kannada film industry. Nagathihalli Chandrasekhar also helped him during his last days by paying the medical bills via his association Abhivyakthi Samskrithika Vedike. Karibasavaiah was in distress since 2009 when his married daughter Radha committed suicide. A stage actor, television and cinema actor Karibasavaiah is known for natural performance. He was paired with another popular actress Umashree in several movies and was considered a hit pair. Belakinedege was his last released film.

== Death ==
Karibasavaiah was admitted to a private hospital in Bangalore on 31 January 2012 following a road accident. He was returning home after completing the shooting for the film Breaking News. He succumbed to the injuries and died on 3 February. The last rites were performed in his native place, Kodigehalli village, Thyamagondlu Hobli.

== Partial filmography ==
Year	Film	Role	Notes
1992	Undu Hoda Kondu Hoda	Karimale	
1994	Kotreshi Kanasu	Dibba	
1996	Janumada Jodi	Andani	
1997	Ulta Palta	Shivanandappa's lackey	
1997	Mungarina Minchu	Ajja's servant	
1998	Bhoomi Thayiya Chochchala Maga	Villager	
1998	Simhada Guri		
1999	Snehaloka	Muthanna	
2000	Bhoomi		
2000	Galate Aliyandru		
2000	Yaarige Saluthe Sambala	Kariyappa	
2001	Mathadana	Balanna	
2001	Premi No.1	Singarappa	
2002	Manasella Neene	Venu's friend	
2002	Police Officers	Auto rikshaw driver	
2002	Balagalittu Olage Baa	Kariya	
2002	Olu Saar Bari Olu		
2004	Swetha Naagara	"Conductor" Kariyappa	
2004	Durgi		
2004	Ajju		
2005	Magic Ajji		
2005	Moorkha		
2006	Mandya	Halappa	
2006	Ravi Shastri		
2007	Police Story		
2007	Janapada		
2007	Right Aadre		
2008	Aramane	Basava	
2008	Thayi		
2008	Chikkamagaloora Chikka Mallige		
2009	KA-99 B-333		
2009	Bettadapurada Ditta Makkalu		
2009	Parichaya	Gift shop owner	
2010	Crazy Kutumba		
2010	Aithalakkadi		
2010	Sri Moksha		
2010	Ullasa Utsaha		
2010	Preethi Nee Heegeke		
2010	Holi		
2010	Nooru Janmaku		
2010	Vaare Vah		
2011	5 Idiots		
2011	Taare		
2012	Alemari	Truck driver	
2012	Breaking News	Kariyappa	
2012	Sri Kshetra Adichunchanagiri		
2012	Sangolli Rayanna	Pakiro	
2013	Belakinedege		
