= Charulatha =

Indian actress

Charulathaa
- Born: Saima Khursid; Punjab, India
- Occupation: Actress
- Years active: 1997–present

Charulatha is an Indian actress. She has acted mainly in Kannada films along with Tamil, Telugu and Malayalam films.

== Biography ==
She was born in Punjab, and brought up in Kerala. She started as a model, and then acted in advertisements as a child in Kerala. She first featured as a lead actress in the Kannda film O Mallige directed by V. Manohar gave her name Charulatha/Durgashree. Odia Actor/Etv Networks current Director S.Chakrapani and her wife Roja Ramani gave screen name in Odia movies as Chandashree/Chandini

== Filmography ==
List of Charulatha's film credits
Year	Film	Role	Language	Ref.
1997	Sarpanch Babu	Saniya	Odia	
1997	O Mallige	Mallige (Lakshmi)	Kannada	
1997	Maduve	Divya	Kannada	
1997	Jodi Hakki	Laali	Kannada	
1998	Antaragarmi		Kannada	
1998	Simhada Guri		Kannada	
1998	Maathina Malla		Kannada	
1998	Suvi Suvalali	Kasturi	Kannada	
1998	Jaidev	Pavithra "Pavi"	Kannada	
1999	Habba	Savithri	Kannada	
1999	Underworld		Kannada	
1999	Hrudayanjali		Kannada	
1999	Idhu Yentha Premavay		Kannada	
1999	Mr. X		Kannada	
1999	A.K.47	Raam's Sister (Pooja)	Kannada	
1999	Tuvvi Tuvvi Tuvvi		Kannada	
1999	Asha Nanna Maduve Anteh		Kannada	
1999	Bhootnike		Kannada	
2000	Nagadevathe		Kannada	
2000	Bhoomi	Bhoomi	Kannada	
2000	Nee Nanna Jeeva		Kannada	
2000	Minchu		Kannada	
2000	Naxalite		Kannada	
2000	Mazhanoolkkanavu	Varsha Menon	Malayalam	
2000	Love Story Oru Apoorva Pranayakatha 2000	Divya	Malayalam	
2001	Pandanti Samsaram		Telugu	
2001	Neelambari	Neelambari	Kannada	
2002	Mutham	Bindu	Tamil	
2002	Junior Senior	Varsha	Tamil	
2002	Sena	Janu	Tamil	
2008	Bommana Brothers Chandana Sisters	Mani Chandana	Telugu	
2008	Pallavi Illada Charana		Kannada	
2009	Thabbali		Kannada	
2009	Enga Raasi Nalla Raasi	Aishwarya / Malathi	Tamil	
2014	Janmasthanam		Telugu	
2015	Ellam Chettante Ishtam Pole	Manju	Malayalam	
2016	Mahaveera Machideva		Kannada	
2016	Appuram Bengal Ippuram Thiruvithamkoor	Devayani	Malayalam	
2017	Chakravarthy	Bhavana (Kumar's wife)	Kannada	
