= Vijayalakshmi (Kannada actress) =

Indian actress

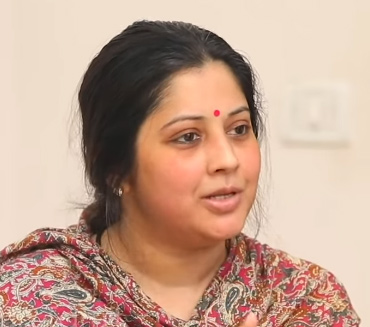
- Vijayalakshmi in 2021
- Born: Madras (now Chennai), Tamil Nadu, India
- Other names: Vijayalaxmi, Viji
- Occupation: Actress
- Years active: 1997–present

Vijayalakshmi is an Indian actress who has predominantly appeared in Kannada and Tamil films while also appearing in Telugu and Malayalam films. In 1997, she won Filmfare Award for Best Actress in Kannada for her performance in her debut film Nagamandala.

== Early life ==
Vijayalakshmi was born in Madras (now Chennai) and completed her studies in Bangalore, Karnataka. Her mother is a Sri Lankan Tamil, who moved to India due to the riots that were happening in Sri Lanka. She has a sister named Usha who was married to Jaya Prada's brother.

== Career ==
=== Film ===
Vijayalakshmi acted in nearly 40 films in her career. She has acted in nearly 25 Kannada films. During her stint as an actress, she was recognised for her beauty and performance. She debuted in director T. S. Nagabharana's film Nagamandala, based on a folk tale, opposite Prakash Raj.

She made her debut in Tamil with the film Poonthottam. She is best known in Tamil for her role in the film Friends along with Vijay and Suriya. The film was a hit and after that, she acted in many films including Kalakalappu, Ramachandra, Military and Soori. She returned to the Tamil film industry again with the comedy film Boss Engira Bhaskaran, which became one of 2010s successes.

In Telugu, she was recognised in the film Hanuman Junction. She has also acted in one Malayalam film, Devadoothan, with Mohanlal.

=== Television ===
She has also acted in some Tamil television serials. She also was an anchor of the game show Bangarada Bete, produced by Radaan Media Works.

== Personal life ==
Vijayalakshmi resided in Chennai for a few years. In 2006, it was reported that Vijayalakshmi attempted suicide by overdosing on sleeping pills after being harassed by an assistant director who wanted to marry her. The decision came at the end of a difficult year for her in which her father also had died, but she survived and recovered thereafter. In November 2006, she announced her engagement to actor Srujan Lokesh, with the wedding pencilled in for March 2007 but the engagement was broken off due to incompatibility.

Vijayalakshmi filed a complaint in February 2020 accusing Seeman of cheating her after being in a relationship with her and claimed that he had not married her despite making promises. After being allegedly harassed by Seeman and his supporters, she attempted suicide again in July 2020 by overdosing on blood pressure tablets and was admitted to hospital.

== Filmography ==
Year	Film	Role	Language	Notes	Ref
1997	Nagamandala	Rani	Kannada	Filmfare Award for Best Actress – Kannada	
1997	Ranganna	Roopa	Kannada		
1997	Jodi Hakki	Roopa	Kannada		
1997	Vimochane		Kannada		
1998	Bhoomi Thayiya Chochchala Maga	Swapna	Kannada		
1998	Maathina Malla		Kannada		
1998	Number One	Chandralekha	Kannada		
1998	Swasthik	Pinky	Kannada		
1998	Poonthottam	Sumathi	Tamil		
1998	Punjabi House		Malayalam	Uncredited	
1999	Pratibhatane	Sudha	Kannada		
1999	Habba	Seetha	Kannada		
1999	Suryavamsha	Parimala	Kannada		
1999	Arunodaya	Shanthi	Kannada		
1999	Dalavayee		Kannada		
1999	Neti Gandhi		Telugu		
2000	Naxalite		Kannada		
2000	Mahatma		Kannada		
2000	Durgada Huli		Kannada	Cameo	
2000	Devadoothan	Sneha	Malayalam		
2001	Friends	Amudha	Tamil		
2001	Kalakalappu	Divya	Tamil		
2001	Hanuman Junction	Devi	Telugu		
2002	Daddy No.1		Kannada		
2002	Prudhvi Narayana	Prudhvi's wife	Telugu		
2003	Ramachandra	Divya	Tamil		
2003	Military	Seetha	Tamil		
2003	Yes Madam	Gayathri	Tamil		
2003	Soori	Devi	Tamil		
2003	Jogula	Shakunthala	Kannada		
2004	Kanakambari	Nirmala Devi	Kannada		
2008	Navashakthi Vaibhava	Goddess Banashankari	Kannada		
2008	Vaazhthugal	Vennila	Tamil		
2010	Boss Engira Bhaskaran	Nandhini	Tamil		
2010	Thillalangadi	Swapna	Tamil		
2011	Thambikottai	Lakshmi	Tamil		
2016	Katha Solla Porom	Anitha's mother	Tamil		
2017	Meesaya Murukku	Adhi's mother	Tamil		
2018	Fighter		Kannada		

=== Television ===
Serials

Year	Title	Role	Language	Channel
2004–2005	Kanavugal Aayiram	Yamuna	Tamil	Jaya TV
2005–2006	Suryavamsam	Manasa	Telugu	Gemini TV
2007–2008	Vasantham	Akila	Tamil	Sun TV
2010–2011	Aradhana		Telugu	Gemini TV
2011–2013	Chellamay	Gayathri	Tamil	Sun TV
2011–2012	Mundhanai Mudichu	Nandhini	Tamil	Sun TV
2013	Muthaaram	ACP Ranjini	Tamil	Sun TV
2017	Nandini	Devi	Tamil & Kannada	Sun TV; Udaya TV
2024	Inspector Rishi	Tribal Shaman	Tamil	Amazon Prime Video

Shows

Year	Title	Role	Language	Channel
2006	Bangarada Bete	Host	Kannada	Udaya TV
2007	Mega Bangarada Bete	Host	Kannada	Udaya TV
2008	Jackpot	Contestant	Tamil	Jaya TV
2010–2011	Vaazhvai Maatralam Vaanga	Host	Tamil	Sun TV
