= D. Rajendra Babu =

Film director

- Rajendra Babu in November 2013
- Born: 12 June 1951
- Died: 3 November 2013 (aged 62); Bangalore, Karnataka, India
- Other name: Babu
- Occupation: Filmmaker
- Years active: 1984–2013
- Spouse: Sumithra (m. 1980)
- Children: Umashankari; Nakshatra

D. Rajendra Babu (30 March 1951 – 3 November 2013) was an Indian filmmaker and screenplay writer in Kannada cinema. He directed over 50 films in various genres, most of them being sentimental films. He wrote and directed numerous blockbuster films, though many of them are re-makes. Apart from Kannada films, he directed one Malayalam and one Hindi film. He is considered one of the most revered directors of the Kannada film industry.

Some of the notable works of Babu are Nanu Nanna Hendathi (1985), Olavina Udugore (1987), Ramachaari (1991), Ramarajyadalli Rakshasaru (1990), Halunda Thavaru (1994), Appaji (1996), Diggajaru (2000), Amma (2001), Encounter Dayanayak (2005) and Bindaas (2010).

== Early career ==
Babu joined the Kannada film industry in the early 1980s as an actor, but later on became a filmmaker. He worked as an associate to many top directors such as Rajendra Singh Babu, K. S. R. Das and V. Somashekhar.

Babu became an independent director with Jiddu, starring Tiger Prabhakar and Jayamala. Though the film was not a big success, his subsequent films such as Swabhimaana and Naanu Nanna Hendthi were massive silver jubilee hits. He has so far directed 50 films including a Hindi film, Pyaar Karke Dekho (1987).

== Personal life ==
Babu was married to Sumithra, a multi-lingual actress. They have two daughters – Umashankari and Nakshatra. Nakshatra has made her acting debut in a Tamil film Doo.

== Death ==
Babu was admitted to M. S. Ramaiah Hospital on 2 November 2013 after he complained of abdominal pain. He died of a heart attack in the hospital on the morning of 3 November.

== Filmography ==
Year	Film	Credited as		Language	Notes
Year	Film	Director	Screenplay	Language	Notes
1984	Jiddu	✓	Question	Kannada	
1984	Kalinga Sarpa	✓	Question	Kannada	
1984	Hosa Ithihaasa	✓	Question	Kannada	
1985	Swabhimana	✓	✓	Kannada	
1985	Naanu Nanna Hendthi	✓	✓	Kannada	
1986	Asambhava	✓	✓	Kannada	
1986	Rekthabhishekam	✓	Question	Malayalam	
1987	Olavina Udugore	✓	✓	Kannada	Also co-produced
1987	Pyaar Karke Dekho	✓	✓	Hindi	
1989	Yuga Purusha	✓	✓	Kannada	Remake of Karz
1989	Samsara Nouke	✓	✓	Kannada	
1990	Ramarajyadalli Rakshasaru	✓	✓	Kannada	
1990	Chakravarthy	✓	✓	Kannada	
1991	Kaala Chakra	✓	✓	Kannada	Also story
1991	Ramachaari	✓	✗	Kannada	Remake of Chinna Thambi
1992	Entede Bhanta	✓	✓	Kannada	Based on novel by Sudarshan Desai
1992	Sriramachandra	✓	✓	Kannada	Remake of Kalyanaraman
1993	Annayya	✓	✓	Kannada	Remake of Beta
1994	Haalunda Thavaru	✓	✓	Kannada	Also dialogues
1994	Karulina Koogu	✓	✓	Kannada	
1996	Appaji	✓	✓	Kannada	
1996	Jeevanadhi	✓	✓	Kannada	Remake of Pesum Deivam
1997	Jodi Hakki	✓	✓	Kannada	Also writer Karnataka State Film Award for Best Screenplay
1998	Kurubana Rani	✓	✓	Kannada	Also writer and dialogues
1998	Yaare Neenu Cheluve	✓	✗	Kannada	Remake of Tamil film Kadhal Kottai
1999	Habba	✓	✓	Kannada	Karnataka State Film Award for Best Screenplay
2000	Devara Maga	✓	✓	Kannada	
2000	Krishna Leele	✓	✓	Kannada	Remake of Tamil film Gokulathil Seethai
2000	Preethse	✓	✓	Kannada	Remake of Hindi film Darr
2000	Yare Nee Abhimani	✓	✓	Kannada	Remake of Hindi film Aaina
2001	Amma	✓	✓	Kannada	Remake of Telugu film Amma Rajinama
2001	Diggajaru	✓	✗	Kannada	Remake of Natpukkaga
2002	Nandhi	✓	✓	Kannada	
2002	Naanu Naane	✓	✓	Kannada	Remake of Raja Hindustani
2003	Swathi Muthu	✓	✗	Kannada	Remake of Telugu film Swathimutyam
2005	Encounter Dayanayak	✓	✗	Kannada	Based on the life of encounter specialist Daya Nayak
2005	Auto Shankar	✓	✗	Kannada	
2006	Uppi Dada MBBS	✓	✓	Kannada	Remake of Hindi film Munnabhai MBBS
2008	Bindaas	✓	✓	Kannada	Based on Telugu film Dhana 51
2008	Bombaat	✓	✓	Kannada	
2014	Aryan	✓	✓	Kannada	Also writer and dialogues Posthumously released
2018	Kuchiku Kuchiku	✓	✓	Kannada	Posthumously released

== Awards and honors ==
- 2011 – Karnataka State Award for Lifetime Achievement.
- 2012 – Puttanna Kanagal Award for Outstanding contribution in Kannada cinema.
