= Devaraj =

Indian actor (born 1953)

- Born: 21 September 1953 (age 72); Bangalore, Mysore State, India
- Occupation: Actor
- Years active: 1986–present
- Spouse: Chandralekha
- Children: 2; including Prajwal Devaraj

Devaraj (born 21 September 1953) is an Indian actor and theatre actor who works in Indian film industry. He has largely featured in Kannada films performing various roles as a lead character, supporting character and villainous character. He has also featured in Telugu and Tamil films.

Having worked in over 200 feature films, Devaraj is popularly referred to as a "Dynamic Hero" in the Kannada film industry. Prior to acting in films, Devaraj performed in stage plays under the guidance of Shankar Nag and B. Jayashree. Devaraj has won several awards and accolades including the Karnataka State Film Award for Best Actor for his portrayal as the protagonist in the film Veerappan in 1991.

== Early life ==
Devaraj was born on 21 September 1953 to Ramachandrappa and Krishnamma in Lingarajpuram, a locality in Bangalore, in the erstwhile Mysore State (now Karnataka). His father worked in ITC Factory, Welfare department. Devaraj lost his father when he was three months old to malaria. In 1976, due to his family's financial problems, Devaraj decided to work in a HMT Watch factory, in the case and dial department, where he worked for nine years. During this time, he was suggested to act in dramas by a senior colleague, Govindaraju. Consequently, Devaraj joined R.Nagesh's theatre group, before joining the B. Jayashree's group Spandana and later Shankar Nag's Sanket. Devaraj's film debut came in 1985, where he played a supporting role in Trishula. He continued to appear as a supporting actor, then acted in leading roles.

== Career ==
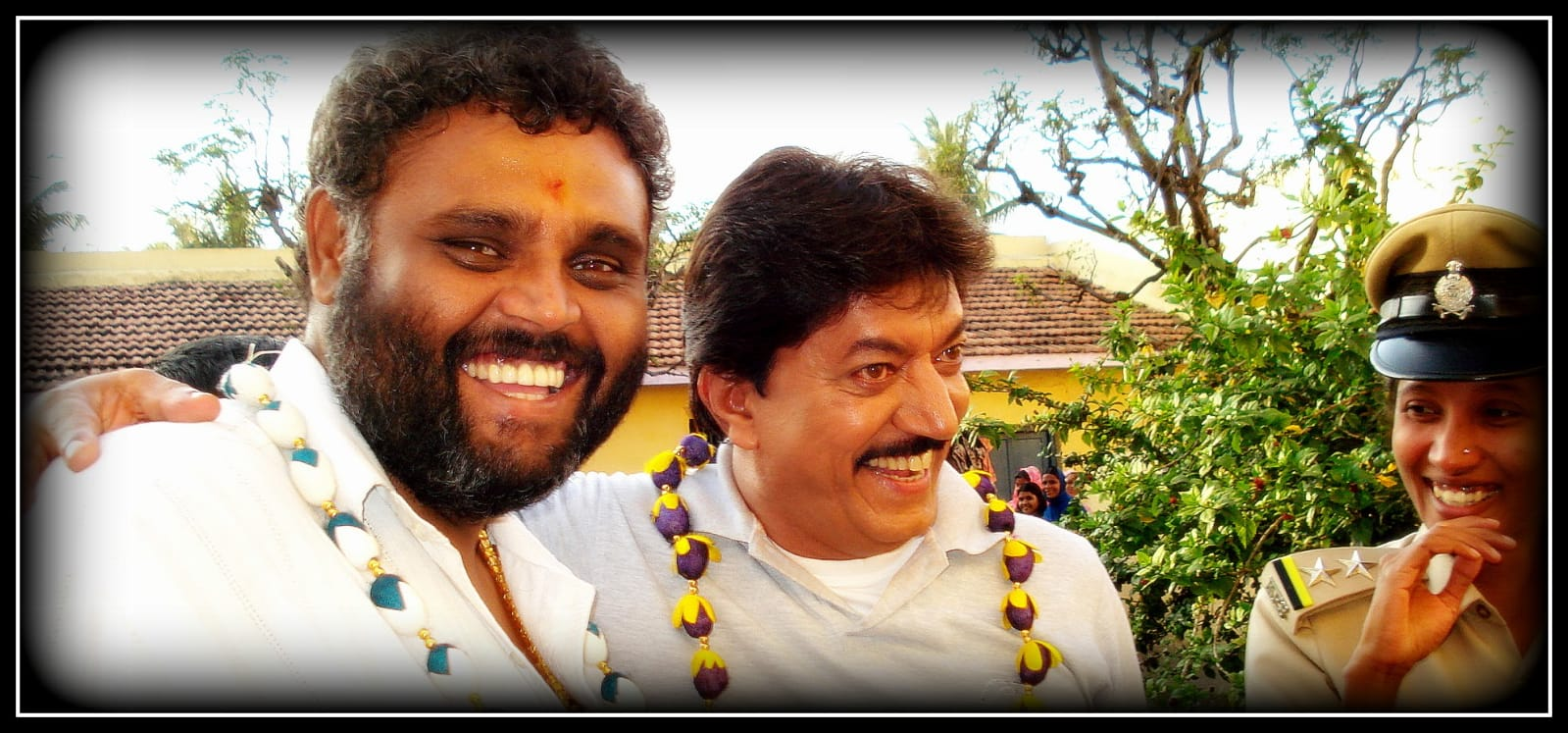
Ravi Srivatsa (left), Devaraj (center)

Devaraj auditioned for Trishula with Avinash, both of whom were part of a same theatre troupe. They got through the auditions and the film was his debut as an actor. However, the film did not release. His first released film was 27 Mavalli Circle in 1986. After the success of 27 Mavalli Circle Devaraj acted in many more films mainly in supporting roles. His notable performances include: His First Hero Leading Role In Hatyakanda In 1989. Upnext Aaganthuka, Navabharatha, Indrajith among others.

After the year 2000, Devaraj switched over to character roles and debuted in Tamil and Telugu film industries. He worked in highly acclaimed films such as Malaikottai and Villu in Tamil and Yagnam, Sri in Telugu.

== Personal life ==
In 1986, Devaraj married actress Chandralekha, whom he had met on the sets of his film Sikku. Following this, they appeared together in the 1992 film Kendada Male. After their marriage, Chandralekha quit acting. They have two sons, Prajwal and Pranam. Both sons are active in the Kannada film industry, with Prajwal having established himself as a lead actor.

== Filmography ==
Key
†	Denotes films that have not yet been released

=== Kannada ===
Year	Title	Role	Note(s)
1985	Thrishula	Vinod	
1986	27 Mavalli Circle	Gunda	
1986	Preethi	Srikanth	
1987	Aaganthuka	Chandru	Karnataka State Film Award for Best Supporting Actor
1987	Anthima Theerpu		
1987	Ravana Rajya		
1987	Kendada Male		
1987	Dance Raja Dance		
1987	Bandha Muktha		
1987	Sangarama		
1987	Aapadbhandava		
1988	Arjun		
1988	Sambhavami Yuge Yuge		
1988	Navabharatha		
1988	Elu Suttina Kote		
1988	Samyuktha		Cameo appearance
1988	Jana Nayaka	Narasimha	
1988	Sangliyana	Vikram	
1988	Anjada Gandu	Sundar	
1988	Ramanna Shamanna		
1988	Krishna Rukmini		
1988	Daada	Micheal	
1988	Nee Nanna Daiva		
1988	Meenakshi Mane Meshtru		
1989	Yuddha Kaanda	J. D. Patil	
1989	Tarka	Rithwik Kumar	
1989	Hrudaya Geethe		
1989	Jockey		
1989	Amanusha		
1989	Avathara Purusha	Suresh	
1989	Indrajith	Fernandes	
1989	Hathya Kaanda		First lead role
1989	Deva	Ramaraj	
1989	Hendthighelbedi	CID Inspector Prathap	
1989	C.B.I. Shankar	Amar	
1989	Idu Saadhya	Ravi	
1989	Poli Huduga		
1990	Nammoora Hammera		
1990	Ranabheri	David	
1990	S. P. Sangliyana Part 2	Vikram	
1990	Thrinetra	Shankar	
1990	Aavesha	Sub-inspector A. Prathap	
1990	Bannada Gejje	Deluxe	
1990	Policena Hendthi	Avatari Lokayya	
1990	Prathap	Devu	
1990	Utkarsha	Rajesh Sharma	
1990	College Hero		
1990	Poli Kitty		
1991	Sundara Kanda		
1991	Kadana		
1991	Ide Police Belt		
1991	Rollcall Ramakrishna	Inspector Devaraj	
1991	S. P. Bhargavi	Shankar	
1991	Veerappan		Karnataka State Film Award for Best Actor
1991	Aranyadalli Abhimanyu		
1991	Shwetagni		
1991	Veera Dheera		
1991	Gruha Pravesha		
1991	Mathru Bhagya	Madan	
1991	Nagini		
1992	Chitralekha		
1992	Pruthviraj	Pruthviraj / Keerthiraj	
1992	Goonda Rajya		
1992	Nanna Thangi		
1992	Police File		
1992	Bhale Keshava		
1992	Roshagara	Inspector Vijay	
1992	Prajegalu Prabhugalu		
1992	Gharshane		
1993	Bahaddur Hennu	Vinod	
1993	Rajakeeya		
1993	Sidukabeda Singari		
1993	Abhijith		
1993	Golibaar	Arjun	
1993	Vijaya Kranthi		
1993	Mojina Maduve		
1993	Jailor Jagannath	Thyagaraj	
1993	Hosa Love Story		
1994	Time Bomb	Prathap	
1994	Adhipathi		
1994	Gold Medal	Subhash	
1994	Looti Gang		
1994	Mayor Prabhakar		
1994	Lockup Death	Amar	
1994	Vijaya Kankana	Shankar	
1994	Curfew	DCP Pradeep	
1994	Hettha Karulu		
1994	Indian		
1994	Nyayakkagi Saval		
1995	Kidnap		
1995	Killer Diary	Inspector Pratap / Golibar Govinda	
1995	Mother India		
1995	State Rowdy		
1995	Samara	Ravi	
1995	Police Power	Puttamallu	
1995	Revenge		
1996	Emergency		
1996	Veerabhadra		
1996	Circle Inspector		
1996	Huliya	Huliya	
1996	Simhadri		
1996	Bangarada Mane		
1996	Kempu Mugilu		
1997	Choobana		
1997	Gandedhe Bhaira		
1997	Yuddha		
1997	Sangliyana Part 3	Sangliyana	
1997	Manava 2022		
1998	High Command		
1998	Jai Hind		
1998	Agnisakshi		
1998	Dayadi		
1998	Karnataka Police	Hemanth	
1999	Aryabhata	Riyaz	
1999	Tharikere Yerimele		
1999	Mr. X		
1999	Habba	Devu	
1999	Garuda		
1999	Durga Shakti		
1999	Om Shakti		
2000	Minchu		
2000	Dandanayaka	Narasimha Nayaka	
2000	Astra	Sharath	
2000	Bhoomi	Kathla	
2000	Billa Ranga		
2000	Naxalite		
2000	Bannada Hejje		
2001	Mathadana	Sadaravalli Markandeya Gowda	
2001	Prema Rajya		
2001	Jenu Goodu		
2001	Kanoonu		
2001	Sathyameva Jayathe		
2001	Kotigobba	Amar	
2001	Neelambari	Bharath	
2001	Haalu Sakkare		
2002	Dharma Devathe		
2002	Kambalahalli	Malla	
2003	Hey Nan Bheeshma Kano	Bheeshma, Krishna	Dual roles
2003	Yaardo Duddu Yellammana Jathre		
2003	Lankesh Patrike	ACP Ramu	
2003	Tada Khaidi		
2003	Prathidwani		
2003	Thalwar		
2003	Market Raja		
2003	Inspector Jayasimha		
2003	Khaki	Inspector Dinakar	
2004	Avale Nanna Gelathi		
2004	Devasura		
2004	Crime Story		
2004	Gowdru	Rudrappa Gowda	
2004	Maurya	Prathap	
2004	Jyeshta	Devu	
2005	Deadly Soma	B. B. Ashok Kumar	
2006	Nidhi		
2006	Chellata	Rudra	
2006	Pandavaru	Devanna	
2006	Kallarali Hoovagi	Hyder Ali	
2007	Bhanamathi		
2008	Gaja	Devendra	
2008	Prachanda Ravana		
2008	Nanda Deepa		
2009	Veera Madakari	Police commissioner	
2009	IPC Section 300	Mallikarjun	
2010	Anischitha		
2010	School Master		
2010	Porki	ACP Abdul Azem Sher Khan	
2010	Aparadhi		
2010	Meshtru	Narayana	
2010	Gandedhe	Shankare Gowda	
2010	Gang Leader		
2010	Deadly-2	Vishwajeet Deshmukh	
2011	Jolly Boy	Gopalaswamy	
2011	Chinnada Thali		
2011	Mr. Duplicate	Ramu	
2011	Aidondla Aidu		
2011	Aacharya		
2011	Jarasandha	Ajay Deshpande	
2012	Dashamukha	Devaraj	
2013	Cauvery Nagara		
2015	Ranna	Prakash	
2015	Arjuna	CBI officer	
2016	Preethiyalli Sahaja		
2016	Nithya Jothe Sathya		
2016	Run Antony	Nazeem Khan	
2016	Karvva	Tilak's father	
2016	Kotigobba 2	Orphanage owner	
2016	Mukunda Murari	Retired advocate	
2016	Santhu Straight Forward	Santhosh's father	
2016	Sundaranga Jaana	Panduranga Rao	
2017	Jindaa		
2017	Yugapurusha		
2017	Tarak	Tarak Ram	
2017	Once More Kaurava		
2017	Mufti	Raghuveer Bhandri	
2018	Hebbet Ramakka	Kalleshanna	
2018	Tagaru	ACP Ramachandra	
2019	Geetha	Shankar	
2019	Yajamana	Gurikar Huliyappa Nayaka	SIIMA Award for Best Supporting Actor – Kannada
2019	Amar	Bobby's father	
2019	Odeya	Srinivas Odeyar	
2021	Roberrt	Sathyadev	
2022	Head Bush	D. Devaraj Urs	
2022	Banaras	Ajay Simha	
2023	Prajarajya	Jayaprakash	
2023	Tatsama Tadbhava		Cameo
2023	Raja Marthanda	Raja's father	
2024	Bhairathi Ranagal	Raghuveer Bhandari	
2025	Just Married	Poornachandra	
2026	Shesha 2016	Deputy superintendent of police	
2026	Terror	Rakesh Gaikwad	

=== Telugu ===
Year	Film	Role	Notes
1990	20va Sathabdam	Suryam	
1990	Prema Yuddham	Ranjith	
1990	Kaliyuga Abhimanyudu	Bhagawan	
1990	Neti Siddhartha	Bhillu	
1991	Yerra Mandaram	Jagganna Dora	
1993	Bangaru Bullodu	Nana	
1993	Varasudu	Narendra	
1994	S. P. Parasuram	Rayappa	
1994	Anna		
1999	Samarasimha Reddy	Veera Raghava Reddy's son	
2004	Yagnam	Redappa	
2005	Sri	Bhikshapati	
2006	Raam	Rahim	
2007	Yogi		
2007	Evadaithe Nakenti	Chakravarthi	
2007	Lakshyam	DIG Hari Narayan	
2009	Naa Style Veru	Parvathy's uncle	
2018	Bharat Ane Nenu	Sripathi Rao	
2023	Salaar: Part 1 – Ceasefire	Om	

=== Tamil ===
Year	Film	Role	Notes
1988	Pillaikkaga		
2007	Malaikottai	Palani	
2009	Villu	Shaan	
2019	NGK	Killivazhavan	

== Awards ==
- Nandi Award for Best Villain - Erra Mandaram
- 9th SIIMA Award for Best Supporting Actor for Yajamana
