= Kaleshwari Group of Monuments =

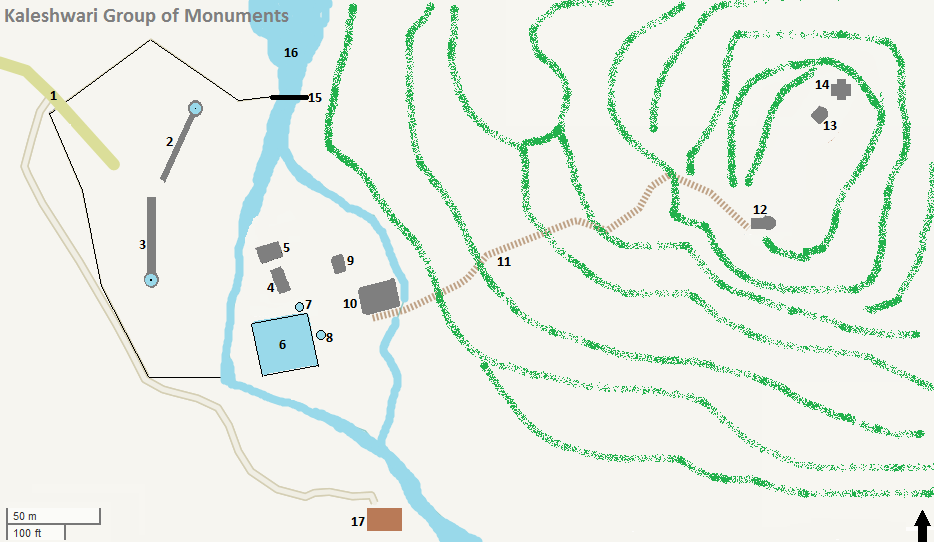
Map of Kaleshwari Group of Monuments: 1. Main Gate; 2. Vahu ni Vav; 3. Sasu ni Vav; 4. Ghummatvalu Mandir; 5. Kaleshvari Mata Temple; 6. Kund; 7. Well; 8. Well; 9. Sculpture Gallery; 10. Shikar Madhi; 11. Steps leading to hillock; 12. Bhim Chauri; 13. Arjun Chauri; 14. Hidimba Temple; 15. Checkdam; 16. Stream; 17. Cremation ground

The Kaleshwari Group of Monuments (Gujarati: કલેશ્વરી સ્મારક સમુહ), also known as Kaleshwari-Ni Nal (Gujarati: કલેશ્વરીની નાળ), is located near Lavana village, Khanpur Taluka of Mahisagar district, Gujarat, India. It is near the district headquarters Lunavada and near a stream in Hidimba Van, the forest of Hidimba. The group includes intricately carved temple ruins, two stepwells, a reservoir, structures with panels of erotic sculptures and idols scattered all over the site. The ruins are located at the foothills and on the hillock. They were built between the 10th and 16th century; some monuments were reconstructed after the 18th century. These are State Protected Monuments. It's believed that the site was selected for constructing the complex since it was situated on the old trade route from Gujarat to Rajasthan

== History ==
There was an ancient settlement known as Lavaneshwari at this place is still known as Lavana. The site is located near a stream which is now a check-dammed up stream. Traditionally these places are associated with characters of Mahabharata. The Shiva temple was erected with Mulaprasada (Shrine Proper) and Sabhamandapa (Assembly Hall) in the 10th century. The temple fell into ruins later. The Kund (reservoir) was constructed in the 11th or 12th century. The twin stepwells were built in the 14th to 15th century. This was followed by the construction of Bhim Chauri in the 14th to 15th century, Arjun Chauri and Hidimba temple was built in the 15th to 16th century on the nearby hillock. All these temples are in ruins now.

It is said that Mala Rana, the prince of Lunavada State, restored it in 1549 but the inscription is worn out. The cella was rebuilt in reduced size and is now known as Ghummatvalu Mandir. The assembly hall of it is reconstructed and converted into a temple which is now known as Kaleshwari Mata Temple. The Shikar Madhi was built by Vakhat Singh from ruins of ancient structures in the first half of the 18th century.

The ruins were restored in the 2000s by the State Archeology Department of Gujarat and are promoted as a tourism spot.

== Monuments ==
The monuments include intricately carved temple ruins, two stepwells, a kund, structures with panels of erotic sculptures and idols scattered all over the site.

=== Temples ===
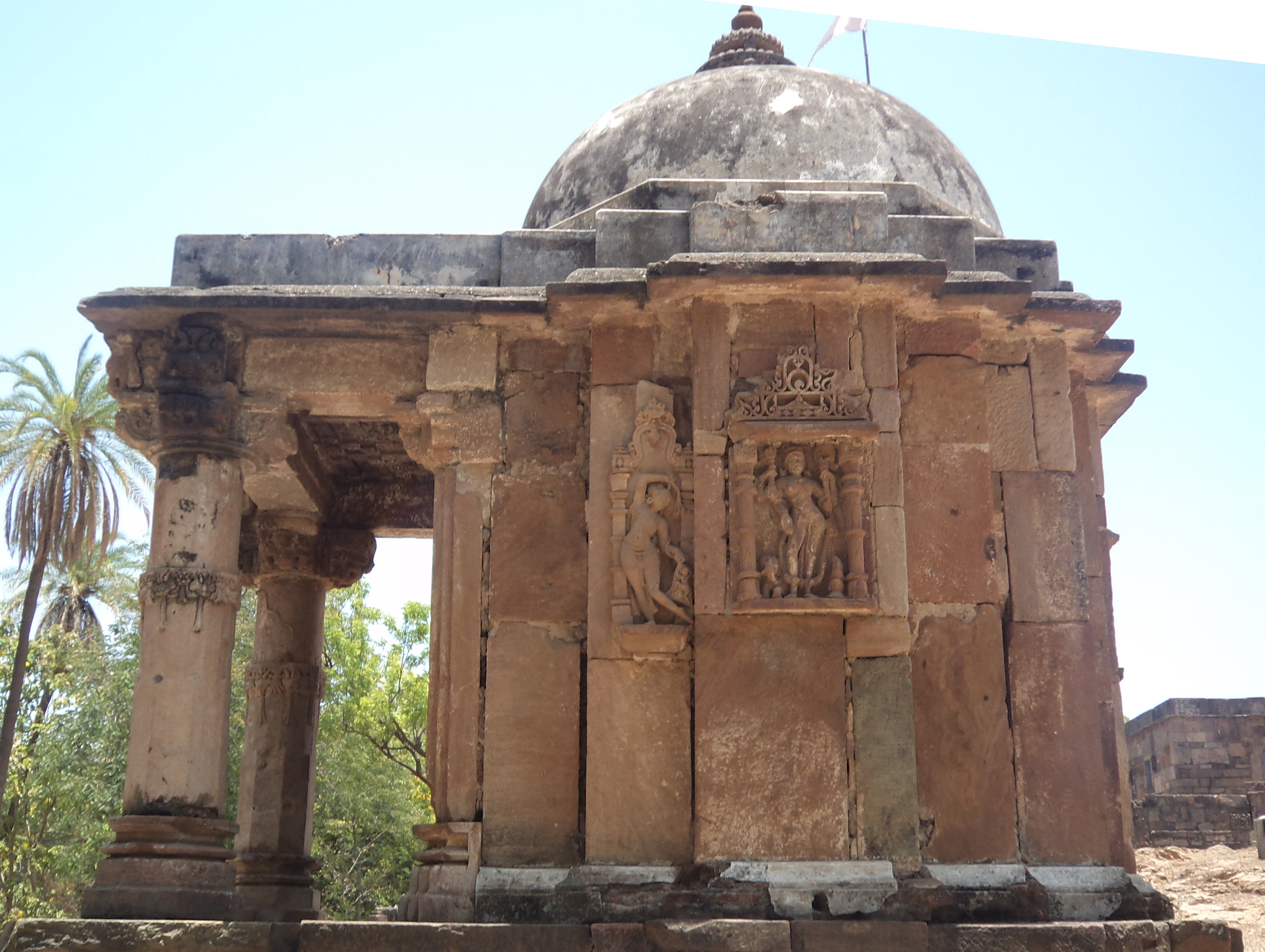
Ghummatvalu Mandir

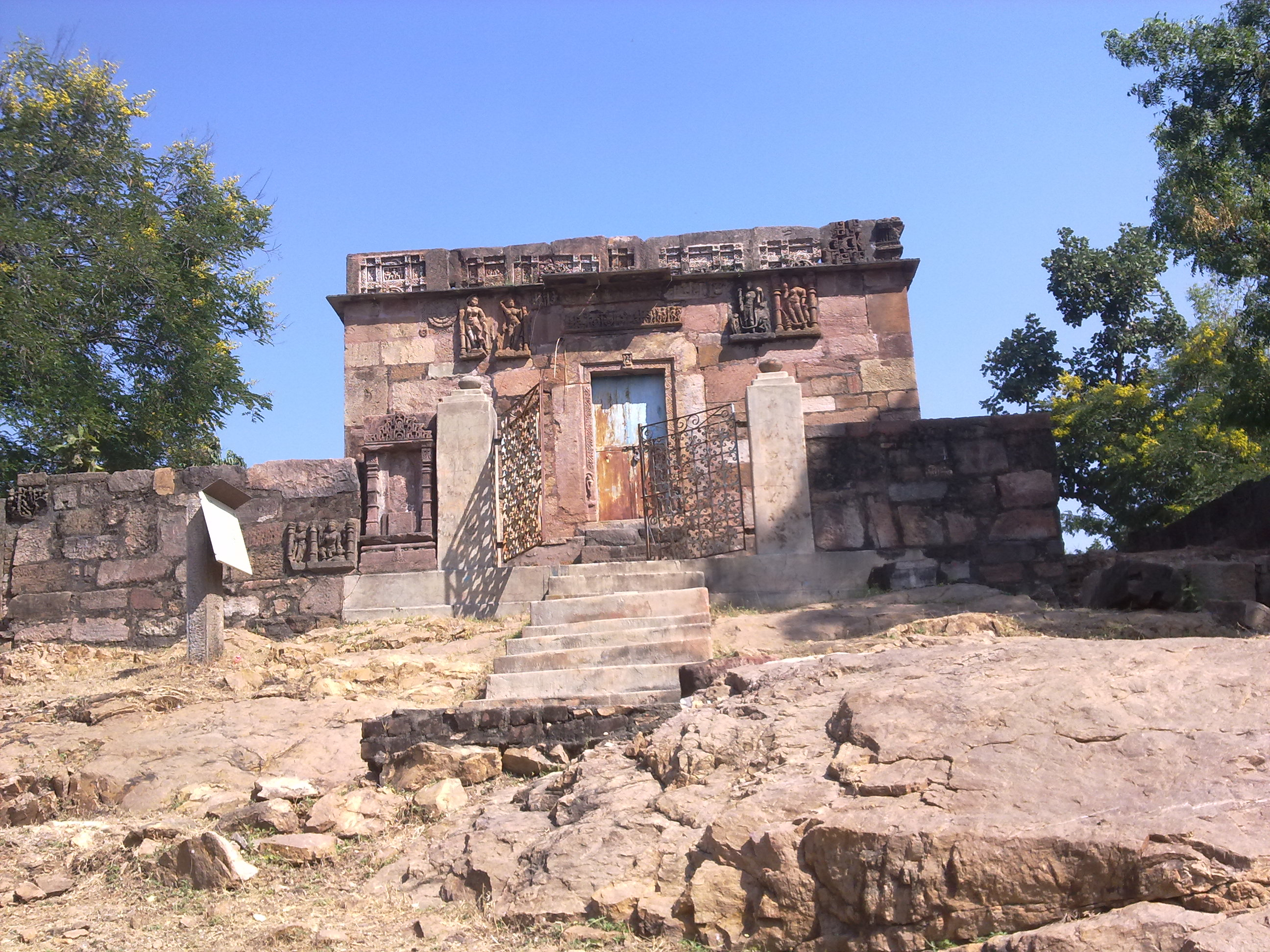
Shikar Madhi

The Ghummatwalu Mandir is restored from the number of idols and pillars from the original temple belonging to the 10th century. The original temple was built in Anarta school of Maha-Gurjara style of North Indian temple architecture with Dravidian influences in sculptures. The restored temple is erected in reduced size by recreating cella (Grabhagriha) inside the original Shrine Proper (Mulaprasada) which can be identified by partially surviving pitha or plinth. The pitha is three buttressed. The sculptures of the jangha of the mandovara (middle part of temple) had Dikpalas, Vyalas and Apsaras. The pillars were eight sided at the base, sixteen sided in middle and circular at the top. The pillars supported flat ceiling. An image of Mahishasurmardini is installed in the sanctum along with a Lingam.

The Kaleshwari or Kaleshri Mata temple is located north of the Ghummatwalu Mandir. The temple has only mandapa, a hall without any elaborate carvings which was the Sabhamandapa (assembly hall) of original temple. The level eaves are supported by ten pilasters and six columns. The niche in the wall is a later addition which has an image of Nataraja Shiva which is locally worshiped as Kaleshwari. Kaleshwari is a local goddess associated with folklore. Based on the inscription on one of the pillars, Mala Rana, the prince of Lunavada State restored the temple in 1549 but the inscription is worn out.

The Shikar Madhi was built by Vakhat Singh (1735-1757), the king of Lunavada, from ruins of ancient structures for night stay when he used to come here for hunting. It has panels of erotic sculptures and idols of the dancing Ganesha, Maheshmardini, Vishnu, Chamunda and Darpan Kanya, dating back to the 10th century. Some sculptures are collected in square gallery nearby.

East of the Shikar Madhi, there is another group of monuments on the hillock reached by flight of 230 steps. Bhima Chauri (Note: It is common in India to associate temples with Pandavas of Mahabharata. Bhima is second among them while Arjuna is third.) is the Shiva temple belonging to the 14th or 15th century suggested by its architectural style. Except the four-pillared entrance and the lower parts of the sanctum and mandap, the temple has been recently restored. The lintel suggesting a circular roof has elaborate carvings. The sanctum threshold, Udumbar, has notable carvings and a Ganesha sculpture. There is a kundi southwest of the temple. There is another temple north of it known as Arjuna Chauri. It is an ancient temple of Shiva which belongs to the 15th or 16th century. Only the lower parts of the temple sanctum and the entrance with the sculptures of Shiva survive. The upper panel of the entrance depicts Shiva in various positions while the lower part depicts her in a standing position.

The Hidimba Temple is north of it. It is a temple with three entrances which has only its lowest part surviving thus nothing definite can be said except the floor plan. The image of the large feet in the temple is popularly associated with Hidimba, the demoness wife of Bhima. The scale of the feet suggests that they were brought from somewhere else and installed here. The forest is called Hidimba Van after her.

=== Kund ===
The almost square reservoir, Kund, also known as Hidimba Kund, is 22 m × 22 m. It was built in the 11th or 12th century from laterite sandstone. Each side has a short flight of five steps perpendicular to the edge and also facing each other leading down to the lower apron. The central flight of each side has a niche with images. Notable among them are images dedicated to Shiva and Vishnu reclining on Shesha and an image depicting local folk dance group. Traditionally the water was used for only ritual bathing and washing, not for drinking. It was repaired with new masonry in 1973 by the Archeological Survey of India. There are two wells located north and east of it.

=== Stepwells ===
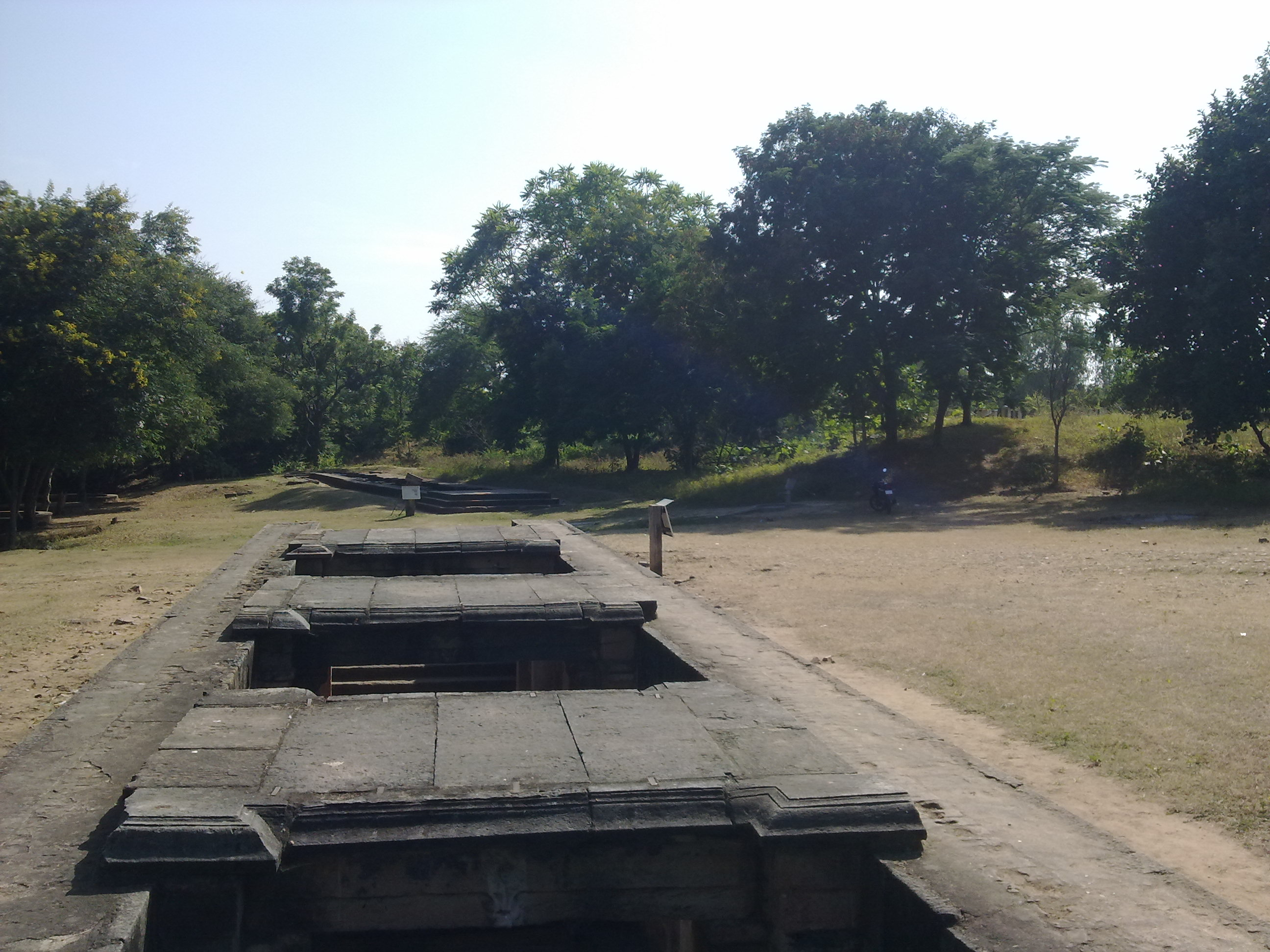
Sasu ni Vav from above ground level, Vahu ni Vav is visible in distance

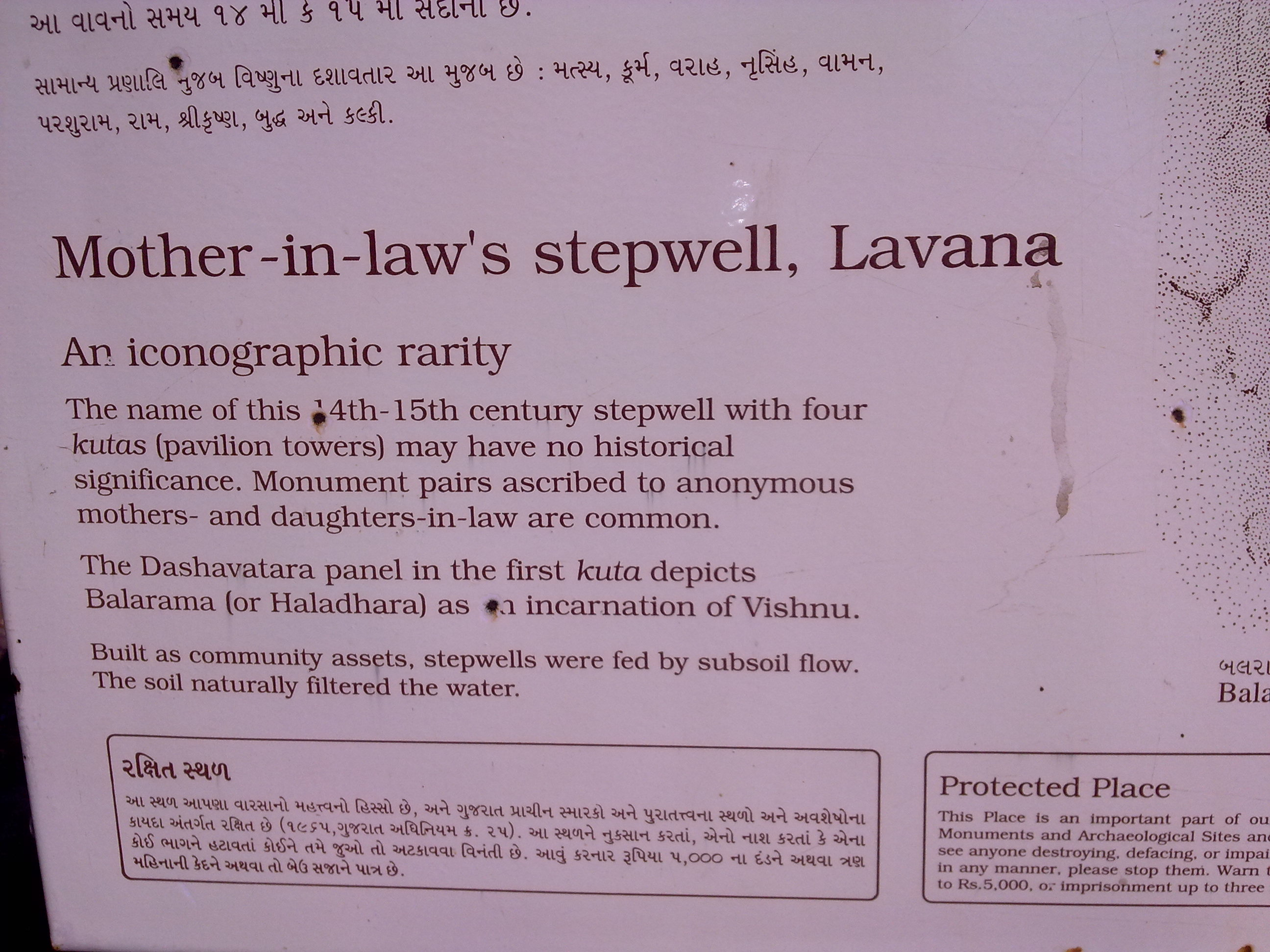
Information on Sasu ni Vav

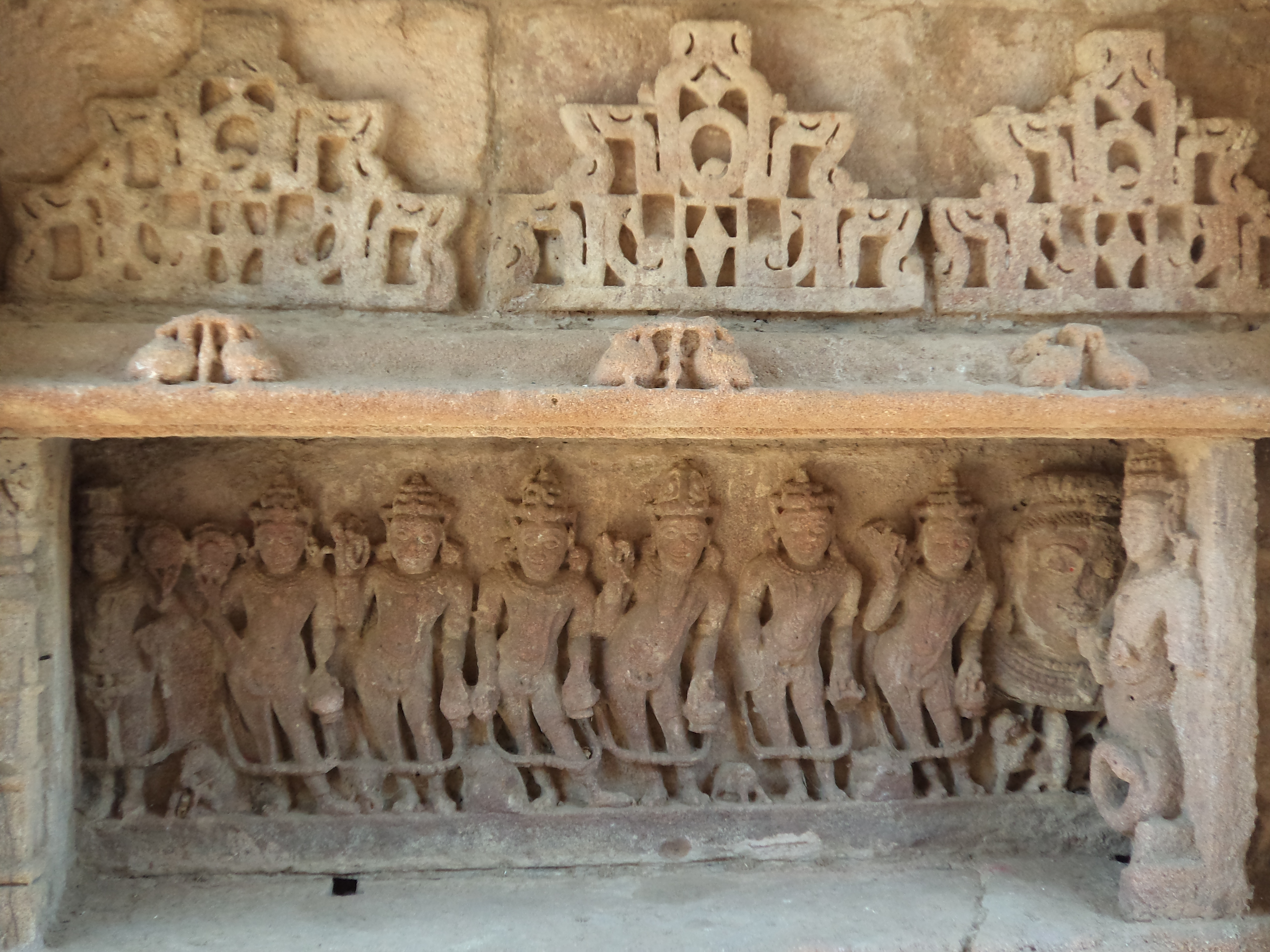
Sculptures of Navagraha in Vahu ni Vav

There are two stepwells; Sasu ni Vav and Vahu ni Vav in the north-west of Kund. They were built by a mother-in-law and her daughter-in-law according to a myth which may not be historically true. The legend says that the mother-in-law denied water to her daughter-in-law from her stepwell so the daughter-in-law built her own stepwell. She built a longer but narrower stepwell which offended her mother-in-law so she cursed the water with impurity. These stepwells were built in the Nanda style in the 14th or 15th century and have exquisitely carved sculptures. Their iconography resembles that of Rani ki vav so these stepwells may belong to the 10th century also. Sasu ni Vav is broader while Vahu ni Vav is narrower. The stepwells have four kutas (pavilion towers) and four mandapas supported by four pilasters without any pillars. The pilasters have monolithic shafts and are of Ruchaka type. Vahu ni Vav is two storied while Sasu ni Vav is four storied.

The northern wall of Sasu ni Vav has sculptures of Lajja Gauri, a woman giving birth to a child; of Shitala with four hands, one having a broom, and riding a donkey. In the first kuta, there are panels dedicated to Navagraha (nine planets) and Dasavatara, the ten incarnations of Vishnu which includes Balarama as an incarnation. Two other incarnations, Matsya and Kurma, are depicted on a lotus. There are sculptures of Makara and snakes which are related to water architecture. The second kuta has Sheshayin Vishnu, Vishnu reclining on Shesha; and a panel of ten figures including Saptamatrika or seven mothers. The third kuta has panels of Saptarshi and two images of Vaishnavi.

The Vahu ni Vav is entered from the south by climbing four steps while the well is in the north. The west wall of the first kuta has Dashavatara. The second kuta has a sculpture of Sheshayin Vishnu on the right while Saptamatrika is on the left. It has carved shaft brackets and is deeper than the other stepwell suggesting the underground flow following the slope of the site. The lower two kuta are narrower than the previous ones.

== Culture ==
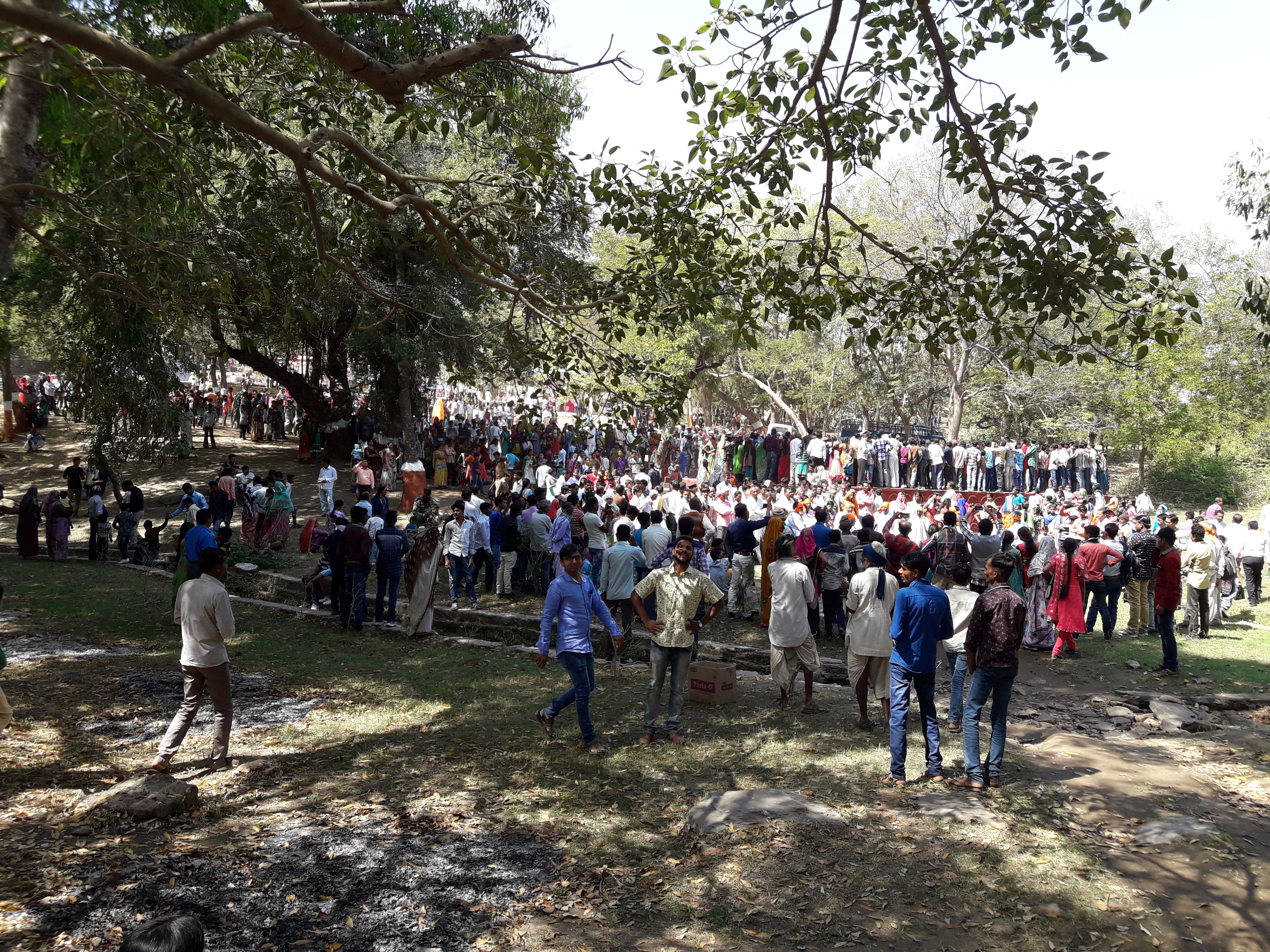
Kaleshwari Art Fair held on Mahashivratri, 2017

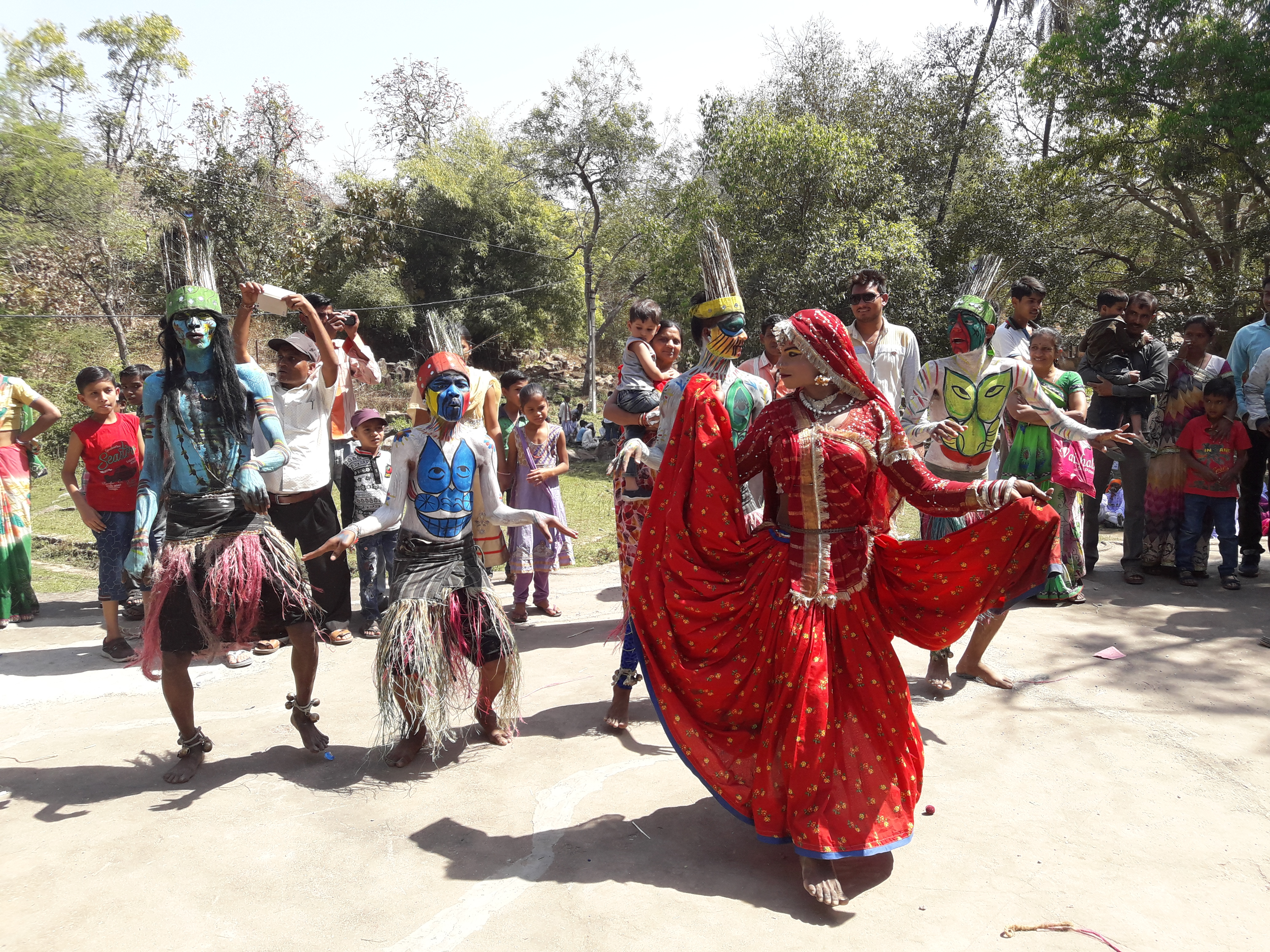
Folks dance by Saharia tribe of Rajasthan in the fair

Annual tribal fairs are organised on Mahashivaratri and Janmashtami which are attended by many people and artists. Traditional and tribal dances, folk music and performances are presented by artists from Gujarat and elsewhere.

The fair is mentioned in Malela Jeev, a novel by Pannalal Patel. Some scenes of the Gujarati film Manavi-Ni Bhavai were shot here.

== Heritage status ==
The Kaleshwari group of monuments include nine State Protected Monuments maintained by the State Archeology Department of Government of Gujarat.

ASI Monument No.	Inscribed name	Also known as	Coordinates
S-GJ-234	Arjun Chauri	Shiva temple	23.322187°N 73.585347°E
S-GJ-235	Kund	Hidimba Kund	23.321049°N 73.582539°E
S-GJ-236	Temple with Three Entrances	Hidimba Temple	23.322295°N 73.585460°E
S-GJ-237	Ancient Temple of Shiva	Ghummatvalu Mandir/Domed temple	23.321372°N 73.582523°E
S-GJ-238	Bhim Chauri	Shiva temple	23.321639°N 73.585071°E
S-GJ-239	Vahu Ni Vav	Daughter-in-law's stepwell	23.321792°N 73.581871°E
S-GJ-240	Shikar Madhi		23.321269°N 73.583031°E
S-GJ-241	Temple with stone Inscription	Kaleshwari Mata Temple/Shilalekhwalu Mandir	23.321500°N 73.582467°E
S-GJ-242	Sasu Ni Vav	Mother-in-law's stepwell	23.321235°N 73.581879°E

== See also ==
- List of State Protected Monuments in Gujarat
