= Vemuri Anjaneya Sarma =

Indian writer

- Born: 24 October 1917; Edumudi, Prakasham district, Andhra Pradesh
- Died: 2 May 2003 (aged 85); Hyderabad, Andhra Pradesh
- Occupation: writer

Vemuri Anjaneya Sarma (24 October 1917 – 6 May 2003) was an Indian writer in the Telugu and Hindi languages. He was active in literary and cultural fields in the Indian independence movement.

== Literary contributions ==
=== Books written on Literary Integration ===
- 'Tootthi Paramparayen' Translation of Telugu novel by Mahidhar Rammohan Rao into Hindi.
- "House Surgeon" translation of Telugu novel written by Dr. Kommuri Venugopala Rao which was awarded with National prize for best translation
- "Is Desh Ki Yah Bhi Ek Samasya Hai" translation of novel by Dr. K. Venugopal Rao into Hindi
- "Dilli Dalarulu" translation of Hindi novel by Panday Bechan Sarma "Ugra" into Telugu
- "Kalasina Jeevithalu", translation of Malela Jeev in Telugu, Gujarati novel by Pannalal Patel
- "Jeevitham Oka Nataka Rangam" translation of Gujarathi Novel into Telugu by Sri Pannalal Patel
- "Vishwarathudu" - Gujarathi Novel - K.M. Munshi into Telugu
- 'Sambarakanya' - Gujarathi Novel — K.M. Munshi
- 'Devadatta' - Gujarathi Novel — K.M. Munshi into Telugu
- 'Vishwanath Ki Kahaniyan' - Telugu Stories of Jnanapeeth Puraskar Winner Sri Viswanatha Satyanarayana into Hindi
- 'Munimanikyam Ki Kahaniyan' - Telugu Stories by Sri Munimanikyam Narasimha Rao into Hindi
- 'Akkasha Deepam' - Hindi Stories into Telugu
- 'Urdu Kathalu' - Urdu Stories into Telugu
- 'Alluri Seetharama Raju' - Drama of Sri Padala Rama Rao into Hindi
- 'Kala-Jeevitha Darshanam' - Kaka Kalekar's Book into Telugu
- Naa Bhartha Naa Daivam' - Book on Sri Lalbahadur Sastry as Told by Smt. Lalitha Devi written by Umashankarji
- 'Tirupathi Venkata Kavulu' English to Telugu Translation
- Translation of 'Gandhi and Marx' by Kishorilal Mashruwala into Telugu
- 'Godavari Hans Padi' - Telugu Stories into Hindi — Editing
- 'Kali Khil Uthi' - Telugu Short Stories — Editing
- 'Srestha Kahaniyan' - Collection of Hindi Stories - 1973
- 'Bharath Katha Sarovar' - Stories written in Hindi by Non Hindi writers — Editing
- 'Vishwanath Krititva Aur Vyaktitwa' - Articles written — Editing
- 'Mangal prabhatham' - Gandhi's book into Telugu
- Founder Editor of 'Sravanthi' Telugu Literary Monthly

=== Editor ===
- Founder Editor of 'Sravanthi' - Telugu Literary Monthly being Published for 52 years By DBHP Sabha, Hyderabad
- Poorna Kumbh_Hindi Monthly
- Dakshin Bharath — Hindi Monthly
- Dakshin Bharathi — Hindi Quarterly
- Kerala Bharathi — Hindi Monthly
- Samaveth Swar — Hindi Bi – Monthly
