= Karnataka State Film Award for Best Lyricist =

Indian film award

- State award for contributions to Kannada cinema
- Awarded for: Best Lyricist who wrote the emotions in songs
- Sponsored by: Government of Karnataka
- Rewards: Silver Medal; ₹ 20,000
- First award: 1993-94
- Final award: 2021
- Most recent winner: Nagarjun Sharma

Highlights
- Total awarded: 26
- First winner: V. Manohar

Karnataka State Film Award for Best Lyricist is a film award of the Indian state of Karnataka given during the annual Karnataka State Film Awards. The award honours lyricists for their poetic works in Kannada-language films.

== Superlative winners ==
• Baraguru Ramachandrappa	4 Awards

== Award winners ==
The following is a complete list of award winners and the name of the films for which they won.

Year	Winner	Film	Song
2021	Nagarjun Sharma	777 Charlie	"The Hymn of Dharma"
2020	Gargi Karehaklu Sachin Shetty Kamble	Parjanya; Ee Mannu	
2019	Razak Puttur	Pencil Box	"Rekkeya Kattade"
2018	Baraguru Ramachandrappa	Bayalatada Bheemanna	"Saave.. Saave.."
2017	J. M. Prahlad	March 22	"Muthu Rathnada Pyate"
2016	Karthik Saragur	Jeerjimbe	
2015	V. Nagendra Prasad	Muddu Manase	"Edeyal Yaaro Ghazal"
2014	Hulikunte Murthy	Kaudi	"Belaka Battaleyolage"
2013	Arasu Anthare	Madarangi	"Male Haniye"
2012	B. H. Mallikarjun	Ee Bhoomi Aa Bhaanu	All Songs
2011	Baraguru Ramachandrappa	Bhageerathi	All Songs
2010-11	A. Bangaru	Kalgejje	"Ee Panchamavedada"
2009-10	V. Nagendra Prasad	Sathya	"Eradakshara"
2008-09	K. Kalyan	Ganga Kaveri	All songs
2007-08	Gollahalli Shivaprasad	Maathaad Maathaadu Mallige	"Ella Maaya"
2006-07	Jayanth Kaikini	Mungaru Male	"Anisuthide"
2005-06	Baraguru Ramachandrappa	Thaayi	"Barutheve Naav Barutheve"
2004-05	Lakshmipathi Kolar	Beru	
2004-05	Krishnamurthy Hanur	Beru	
2003-04	K. Kalyan	Preethi Prema Pranaya	"Sundara Sundara Lokavidu"
2002-03	Nagathihalli Chandrashekar	Paris Pranaya	All Songs
2001-02	Hamsalekha	Sri Manjunatha	"Obbane Obbane"
2000-01	Itagi Eeranna	Sparsha	"Chandakinta Chanda"
1999-2000	Baraguru Ramachandrappa	Hagalu Vesha	All Songs
1998-99	Siddhalingaiah	Pratibhatane	"Hasuvininda Sattoru"
1997-98	J. M. Prahlad	Nodu Baa Nammoora	"Entha Maayavo"
1996-97	Doddarange Gowda	Janumada Jodi	"Kolumande Jangama"
1995-96	Doddarange Gowda	Kavya	"Vandane Vandane"
1994-95	Hamsalekha	Halunda Tavaru	"Ele Hombisile"
1993-94	V. Manohar	Gejje Naada	All Songs

== See also ==
- Cinema of Karnataka
- List of Kannada-language films
