= Kommuri =

Kommuri may refer to:

- Kommuri Sambasiva Rao (born 1926), writer from Andhra Pradesh, famous for detective novels
- Kommuri Venugopala Rao (born 1935), writer from Andhra Pradesh
