= Shivadhwaj Shetty =

Indian multi-language actor and director

- Occupations: Actor, director
- Years active: 1999–present
- Notable work: Gaggara (2008); Naa Puttna Mann (2011); Imbu (2026)
- Children: 2

Shivadhwaj Shetty is an Indian actor and director, who works in Kannada, Tulu, Konkani and Kodava-language films. He is a two-time National award winner for his Tulu directorial films.

== Career ==
Shivadhwaj's earlier career was marked with appearances in T. S. Nagabharana's films. In 2008, he made his directorial debut with the Tulu film Gaggara, which was screened at the Indian Panorama section of the International Film Festival of India and won the National Film Award for Best Feature Film in Tulu. He made his debut in Kodava with the film Naa Puttna Mann (2011), which won the Karnataka State Film Award for Best Regional Film. The film was notably one of the only successful Kodava films and had a 35 day theatrical run. He also worked with Baraguru Ramachandrappa for a film.

In 2020, his film E-Mannu won the Karnataka State Film Award for Special Film of Social Concern. In 2023, his film Koramma won the Special Jury Mention at the Bengaluru International Film Festival. In 2026, his directorial Imbu won the National Film Award for Best Feature Film in Tulu. He has since acted in more than 40 films in five languages and has directed six films.

== Filmography ==
- Note: all films are in Kannada, unless otherwise noted.

=== As a director ===
- Gaggara (2008; Tulu)
- Neene Neene (2008)
- Naa Puttna Mann (2011; Kodava)
- E-Mannu (2020)
- Koramma (2023; Tulu)
- Imbu (2026; Tulu)

=== As an actor ===
- Idu Entha Premavayya (1999)
- Bhaktha Ayyappa (2000)
- Gajina Mane (2000)
- Neela (2001)
- Dakota Express (2002)
- Nagarahavu (2002)
- Prema (2002)
- Singaravva (2003)
- Thayi Illada Thabbali (2003)
- Ananda Nilaya (2003)
- Game For Love (2003)
- Preethsod Thappa (2003)
- Shubham (2006)
- Naayudamma (2006; Telugu)
- Ee Rajeev Gandhi Alla (2007)
- Sri Danamma Devi (2007)
- Jnana Jyothi Sri Siddaganga (2008)
- Chaithanya (2009)
- Udvega (2008)
- Mr. Painter (2009)
- Ujwaadu (2011; Konkani)
- Bhagirathi (2012)
- Manasa (2013)
- Bangarda Kural (2013; Tulu)
- Billion Dollar Baby (2014)
- Makkale Manikya (2014)
- Eregla Panodchi (2015)
- Priyanka (2016)
- Panoda Bodcha (2016)
- Pattanaje (2017)
- Gandada Kudi (2019)

=== Television ===
As an actor

- Ananda Sagara

As a producer

- Majaa Bharatha
- Mahalakshmi Maduve
- Swathi Muthu
