= Shubham (film) =

- Directed by: Ravi Garani
- Written by: Ravi Garani
- Produced by: N R Shetty
- Starring: Shivadhwaj; Sanjeeda Sheikh
- Cinematography: R Giri
- Edited by: Nagendra Urs
- Music by: Gurukiran
- Production company: N Films
- Release date: 21 March 2006
- Country: India
- Language: Kannada

Shubham is a 2006 Indian Kannada-language romantic drama film written and directed by Ravi Garani and starring Shivadhwaj and Sanjeeda Sheikh.

== Cast ==
- Shivadhwaj as Venky
- Sanjeeda Sheikh as Priya
- Kishore as Priya's brother
- Loknath
- Vanitha Vasu as Priya's sister-in-law
- Pavithra Lokesh as Venky's fake wife
- Sangamesh Upase
- M. S. Umesh
- Mandya Ramesh
- Mandeep Roy as servant
- Dinesh Mangaluru as Priya's brother
- Baby Kruthika
- Baby Nikitha
- Master Aniruddh

== Production ==
Two versions of this film were shot for the class and mass audiences, respectively.

== Soundtrack ==
The music was composed by Gurukiran.

Track listing
No.	Title	Lyrics	Singer(s)	Length
1.	"Aaha Yuvaraani"	V. Manohar	C Ashwath, Nandini	4:13
2.	"Ee Dhamani Dhamani"	V. Nagendra Prasad	Rajesh Krishnan, K. S. Chithra	4:20
3.	"Ee Mounava"	K. Kalyan	Rajesh Krishnan, K. S. Chithra	4:43
4.	"Enaaytho"		Gurukiran	4:28
5.	"Hani Hani"	Kaviraj	K. S. Chithra	4:53
6.	"Love Kane"	Kaviraj	Vijay Yesudas	4:07
7.	"Thale Kerkond Barthaane"	Sriranga	Malgudi Subha	3:45
8.	"Yaarivanu"	Kaviraj	Gurukiran, Usha Uthup, Vidya	4:05
Total length:				34:34

== Reception ==
R. G. Vijayasarathy from IANS wrote that "The film will be more remembered for Giri’s photography than any other thing. He is certainly the best in the team. Shubham has rich technical values but with a poor story and script". A critic from Rediff.com wrote that "It is the story and direction that is the major letdown". A critic from Vijaya Karnataka gave the film a positive review. A critic from Viggy wrote that "In a nutshell, watch Shubham if you haven't seen a technically good Kannada film in the recent past". A critic from Chitraloka wrote that "N Films has made a very good attempt to remain different from the usual run of the mill films. This is worth more than your ticket price. Go watch it". Sify wrote "Director Ravi R Gharani’s Shubam that carried a lot of pre-release hype takes off on a promising note but post interval fails miserably. Stunning visuals of virgin locations and good music are the highlights of this otherwise disappointing film".
