= 44th Filmfare Awards South =

Award ceremony for South Indian films

- Date: 30 August 1997
- Site: Hyderabad, Andhra Pradesh, India
- Hosted by: Raajeshwari Sachdev

The 44th Filmfare Awards South ceremony, honouring the winners and nominees of the best of South Indian cinema films released 1996, was held in Hyderabad on 30 August 1997. The awards were distributed at Ravindra Bharati Auditorium, Hyderabad.

== Main awards ==
=== Kannada cinema ===
Best Film	Best Director
Janumada Jodi	T. S. Nagabharana – Janumada Jodi
Best Actor	Best Actress
Shiva Rajkumar – Nammoora Mandara Hoove	Shilpa – Janumada Jodi
Best Music Director
V. Manohar – Janumada Jodi

=== Malayalam cinema ===
Best Film	Best Director
Thooval Kottaram	Satyan Anthikad – Thooval Kottaram
Best Actor	Best Actress
Jayaram – Thooval Kottaram	Manju Warrier – Ee Puzhayum Kadannu
Best Music Director
Kaithapram Damodaran Namboothiri – Desadanam

=== Tamil cinema ===
Best Film	Best Director
Indian	Agathiyan – Kadhal Kottai
Best Actor	Best Actress
Kamal Haasan – Indian	Shruti – Kalki
Best Music Director
A. R. Rahman – Kadhal Desam

=== Telugu cinema ===
Best Film	Best Director
Ninne Pelladata	Krishna Vamsi - Ninne Pelladata
Best Actor	Best Actress
Venkatesh – Dharma Chakram	Tabu – Ninne Pelladata
Best Music Director
M. M. Keeravani – Pelli Sandadi

== Special awards ==
Lifetime Achievement
- Krishna
- Sharada
