= Aavesha =

- Title card
- Directed by: Peraala
- Written by: Peraala
- Produced by: Ravikrishna
- Starring: Shankar Nag; Geetha; Devaraj; Bhavya; Shivaranjini
- Cinematography: Sundarnath Suvarna
- Edited by: D. Rajagopal
- Music by: Hamsalekha
- Production company: Ravikrishna Films
- Release date: 1990
- Running time: 120 minutes
- Country: India
- Language: Kannada

Aavesha is a 1990 Indian Kannada-language action film written and directed by Perala. It was produced by Ravikrishna under the Ravikrishna films banner. Shankar Nag, Geetha, Devaraj and Bhavya star in it. This was the debut movie of Ramkumar and Shivaranjini.

== Cast ==
- Shankar Nag as Shivappa
- Geetha as Rukkamma
- Devaraj as Sub-inspector A. Prathap
- Bhavya as Amrutha
- Ramkumar as Vishwanath
- Ooha (credited as Shivaranjini) as Indira
- Doddanna as Circle inspector S. Mrutyunjaya
- Ashok Rao as Channagiri Raja "CR"
- Shankar Patil
- Ramesh Bhat as CBI officer Prajwal Kumar
- Sadashiva Brahmavar as Varadachar
- Kunigal Nagabhushan
- Umashree as Savitri
- Sunanda
- Lalithamma
- Kumari Puttamma Srikantaiah
- Bank Janardhan as Kempaiah
- Amruth Sagar
- Honnavalli Krishna as Bhadra
- Chikkanna

== Soundtrack ==
All the songs are composed and scored by Hamsalekha.

S. No.	Song title	Singer(s)	Lyricist	Raga
1	"Dhwani Dhwani"	K. J. Yesudas, S. Janaki	Hamsalekha	Hamsadhwani
2	"Virahi Thava virahi"	S. Janaki	Hamsalekha, Jayadeva	Amritavarshini
3	"Helorilla Illi"	S. P. Balasubrahmanyam	V. Manohar	
4	"Sapthaswarada"	S. P. Balasubrahmanyam, Chandrika Gururaj		
