= Muzik247 Tulu =

- Type: Private
- Industry: Music, Entertainment
- Genre: Various
- Headquarters: Chennai, India
- Website: https://www.muzik247.in/

Muzik247 Tulu is a music label and Movie promoting entity in the Tulu film industry founded in 2015. The company acquires, manages and promotes Tulu language movie content, including audio songs, video songs, trailers, full movie and movie scenes. Movies acquired by Muzik247 include Nirel, Right Bokka Left, Yeregla Panodchi, Rickshaw Driver, Chaali Polilu, Super Marmeye, Rambarooti, Guddeda Bhoota, Bangar Da Kural, Namma Kudla, Villain.

== History ==
Since its launch in September 2015, the YouTube channel of Muzik247 Tulu has had the majority of its traffic from India followed by United Arab Emirates, Saudi Arabia and Kuwait. Muzik247 released "Daye Saipa", a song from the 2016 Tulu movie Rambarooti, which trended on Apple iTunes. It was ranked 34 among iTunes' top 200 Regional Indian chart.

== Films ==
The following is a list of notable movies in Muzik247 Tulu's kitty.

Year	Film
2012	Bangarda Kural
2013	Rickshaw Driver
2014	Nirel
2014	Chaali Polilu
2015	Super Marmaye
2015	Yeregla Panoduchi
2015	Right Bokka Left
2016	Guddedha Bhootha
2016	Rambarooti
2016	Namma Kudla
2016	Villain

== Music Albums Released by Muzik247 Tulu ==
Following are the list of notable music albums Released by Muzik247 Tulu.

Year	Album
2015	Chupke Chupke
2015	Dosthi
