= Malela Jeev =

1941 Gujarati novel by Pannalal Patel

- Cover page
- Author: Pannalal Patel
- Original title: મળેલા જીવ
- Translator: Rajesh I. Patel
- Language: Gujarati
- Subject: Romantic tragedy
- Genre: Novel
- Set in: Ahmedabad, Gujarat
- Publisher: Sanjeevani
- Publication date: 1941 (20th ed. in 2014)
- Publication place: India
- English publication date: 2014
- Media type: Print (Paperback & Hardcover)
- Pages: 272 (Gujarati ed. 2014)
- ISBN: 978-93-80126-00-5
- OCLC: 21052377
- Dewey Decimal: 891.473
- LC Class: PK1859.P28 M3

Malela Jeev (Gujarati: મળેલા જીવ; English: The United Souls) is a Gujarati language romance novel written by Pannalal Patel. Alongside Manvini Bhavai, it is one of Patel's two most widely acclaimed novels. It is a romantic tragedy of Kanji and Jivi, born in different castes. It follows the troubles they face in their love story.

== Origin ==
Gujarati writer-editor, Jhaverchand Meghani, had asked Pannalal Patel to write a story for Phulchhab, a Gujarati daily. Patel then wrote Malela Jeev in 24 days and it was serialised in the daily Phulchhab. It was later published as a book in 1941.

== Characters ==
- Kanji - a gentleman boy, born in a Patel family.
- Jivi - a beautiful woman, born in a barber family.
- Hiro - Kanji's friend
- Dhulo - a barber, who lives in Kanji's village.

== Plot ==
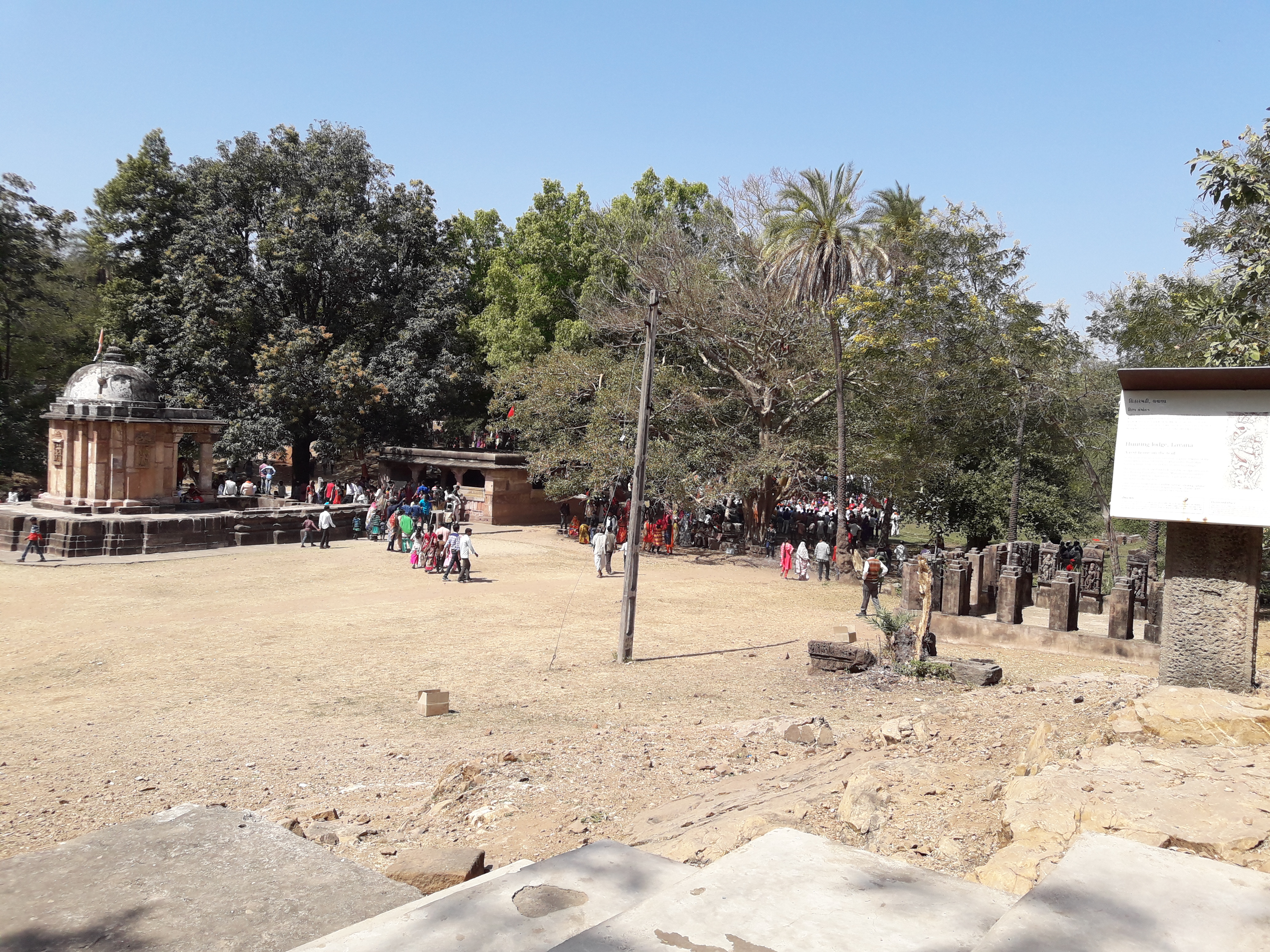
The Kaleshwari Fair mentioned in the novel, where Kanji and Jivi first met

Kanji and Jivi live in Jogipara and Udharia villages near Idar and they belong to different castes. They met each other at the Janmashtami fair and fell in love. They were unable to marry due to coming from different castes. Kanji also has the social responsibility of his elder brother's family. But he finds it difficult to live without Jivi. His friend Hiro suggests having Jivi marry Dhula, the barber in their own village. After a great psychological struggle, Kanji agrees with Hira and get Jivi married to Dhula. But his plan does not bring the expected result. Dhula's suspicious nature, his tyranny, and his poor treatment of Jivi causes Kanji's plan to be unsuccessful. Kanji's God-fearing nature and his indecisive mental state also play a role in his failure. Kanji moves from the village to the city to keep himself away from Jivi. Jivi, meanwhile, is tired of the daily quarrels and beatings and tries to commit suicide. But, by mistake, her tyrannical husband Dhulo loses his life and she falls into an emotional imbalance, yearning for her beloved Kanji. In the end Kanji's worldly love transformed into a spiritual love, and so he comes from the city to be with Jivi.

== Reception ==
The books was well received by readers and critics. Meghani had written, "It is not only the story of Kanji and Jivi but also the story of all of us. It is the sensitive story of the entire society. And herein lies the aesthetic beauty of this novel." Chandrakant Topiwala has written, "It is writer's own local world set in local elements of village reality which is synonymous to the whole world at the level of motion of story elements and psychoanalysis." Sundaram had said, "The story in its present form can serve as a representative of Gujarati literature in any Indian literature and, with some reservations, in world literature." Malela Jeevni Samiksha is a criticism of it written by Labhshankar Thakar with Chinu Modi and Manhar Modi.

It has been reprinted several times; in 1944, 1947, 1950, 1956, 1960, 1962, 1967, 1969, 1973, 1977, 1984, 1986, 1991, 1993, 1998, 1999, 2003, 2005, 2008, 2009, 2011, 2012, 2014 and 2016.

== Translation and adaptations ==
This novel has been translated into several Indian languages such as in Hindi, Punjabi, Kannada and as Kalasina Jeevithalu in Telugu by Vemuri Anjaneya Sarma. The novel was translated by Rajesh I. Patel into English as Kanji and Jivi: A Tragic Love Story in 2014 (Sahitya Akademi, New Delhi). It was translated into Hindi as Jeevi in 1958 by Padmasingh Sharma.

The novel has also been adapted into several films and plays. Ulajhan directed by N. R. Acharya was the first Gujarati film adaptation of the novel. Malela Jeev (1956) is a Gujarati film directed by Manhar Raskapur. It was scripted by the novelist himself. Janumada Jodi, the 1996 blockbuster Kannada film, is based on Malela Jeev. It was also adopted into a play, directed by Nimesh Desai, into Gujarati.
