= Gejje Naada =

1993 film by Vijay Nanjundappa

Gejje Naada is a 1993 Indian Kannada-language romantic drama film directed by Vijay - Nanjundappa. The film cast includes Ramkumar, Shwetha and K. S. Ashwath. The film was produced under Gajamukha Creations banner and the original score and soundtrack were composed by V. Manohar.

== Cast ==
- Ramkumar
- Shwetha
- K. S. Ashwath
- Pandari Bai
- Balakrishna
- Thriller Manju
- Girija Lokesh
- Sudhakar
- Venki
- Master Deepak Kumar

== Soundtrack ==
The music of the film was composed and lyrics written by V. Manohar.

V. Manohar was awarded with the Karnataka State Film Award for Best Lyricist for the year 1993-94 for the song "Megha O Megha" written by him.

Gejje Naada

Soundtrack album by V. Manohar
- Released: 1993
- Genre: Feature film soundtrack
- Label: Lahari Music

No.	Title	Lyrics	Singer(s)	Length
1.	"Kuhoo Kuhoo"	V. Manohar	S. P. Balasubrahmanyam
2.	"Malli Malli Minchulli"	V. Manohar	K. S. Chithra
3.	"Megha O Megha"	V. Manohar	S. P. Balasubrahmanyam, K. S. Chithra
4.	"Sindhu Sindhura Hennige"	V. Manohar	S. P. Balasubrahmanyam, Manjula Gururaj
5.	"Somavara Santhege"	V. Manohar	L. N. Shastry, Manjula Gururaj
6.	"Sundara Naadava"	V. Manohar	Shankar Shanbhag

== Awards ==
- Karnataka State Film Awards 1993-94
1. Best Dialogue - Kotiganahalli Ramaiah
2. Best Lyricist - V. Manohar
