= Angulimala (2013 film) =

- Directed by: Baraguru Ramachandrappa
- Produced by: B. K. Srinivas
- Starring: Saikumar; Raghu Mukherjee; Jayanthi
- Cinematography: Nagaraj Adwani
- Edited by: Suresh Urs
- Music by: V. Manohar
- Production company: Sri Harsha Productions
- Release date: February 2013
- Country: India
- Language: Kannada

Angulimala (Kannada: ಆಂಗೋಲಿಮಾಲ) is a 2013 Indian Kannada-language drama movie starring Saikumar and Raghu Mukherjee in the lead. This film is a message against terrorism, return to the days of Gautama Buddha. This film is directed by Baraguru Ramachandrappa and produced by B. K. Srinivas under Sri Harsha productions banner. V. Manohar is the music director and Nagaraj Adwani is the cinematographer.

The film got selected to premier at the 3rd Annual Rafi Peer Film Festival held at Lahore in Pakistan. It has also been selected for the International Forum of Cinema section of the Kolkata International Film Festival.

== Cast ==
- Saikumar as Angulimala
- Raghu Mukherjee as Buddha
- Jayanthi
- Mukhyamantri Chandru
- Vatsala Mohan
- Girija Lokesh
- Harini
- Radha Ramachandra
- Pallakki Radhakrishna

== Production ==
Prof. Baraguru Ramachandrappa had finished the shooting of his upcoming project "Angulimala" within stipulated time and budget. Dialogue king of South Indian cinema Sai Kumar is playing the title role. BK Srinivas of Sri Harsha Productions is producing this film. This producer director team is the hit makers of sandal wood in this year. Their film Bhagirathi is the first 100 days film of Kannada in 2012. The team always make films having some social commitments.

Angulimala is completed with 32 days shoot and the climax is set at Bangalore Palace. This film is a message against terrorism, return to the days of Gautama Buddha. A press meet was arranged at Bangalore Palace On the completion of shooting.
