= Janapada (film) =

2007 film by Baraguru Ramachandrappa

- Directed by: Baraguru Ramachandrappa
- Written by: Baraguru Ramachandrappa
- Story by: Baraguru Ramachandrappa
- Produced by: G Panju Poojari
- Starring: Raghava; Radhika Kumaraswamy
- Cinematography: Nagaraj Advani
- Edited by: Suresh Urs
- Music by: Hamsalekha
- Production company: Sri Bhagirathi Enterprises
- Release date: April 27, 2007
- Running time: 148 minutes
- Country: India
- Language: Kannada

Janapada is a 2007 Indian Kannada-language drama film written and directed by Baraguru Ramachandrappa. The film was produced by G. Panju Poojari under the banner Sri Bhagirathi Enterprises. It features Raghav and Radhika Kumaraswamy in the lead roles. The supporting cast includes Nandini, Radha Ramachandra and Vathsala Mohan. The score and soundtrack for the film is by Hamsalekha and the cinematography is by Nagaraj Advani.

== Cast ==
- Raghava as Chandranna
- Radhika Kumaraswamy
- Nandini
- Radha Ramachandra
- Vathsala Mohan
- Pushpa Swamy
- Shobhina
- M. S. Umesh
- Sharath Lohithashwa
- Sundar Raj
- Karibasavaiah
- HMT Nanda

== Soundtrack ==
Janapada

Soundtrack album by Hamsalekha
- Genre: Feature film soundtrack
- Language: Kannada
- Label: Lahari Music
- Producer: G. Panju Poojari

The film's background score and soundtrack were composed by Hamsalekha. The music rights were acquired by Lahari Music.

Tracklist
No.	Title	Lyrics	Singer(s)	Length
1.	"Male Hoithu Antha"	Hamsalekha	Anoop Seelin
2.	"Hejje Itta Kade (Balleya Balleya)"	Baraguru Ramachandrappa	Rajesh Krishnan, Nanditha
3.	"Guruve Ninnata (Shivane Ninnata)"	Hamsalekha	Anoop Seelin
4.	"Suvvale (Kai Thutthu)"	Hamsalekha	Anoop Seelin, Latha Hamsalekha
5.	"Hamse"	Hamsalekha	Hemanth
6.	"Ele Ele Banna (Janapada Janapada)"	Baraguru Ramachandrappa	Hemanth

== Reception ==
A critic from Rediff.com wrote that "the film is below par".

== Awards ==
Karnataka State Film Awards - Best Male Playback Singer – Hemanth
