= Pakkhi Hegde =

Indian film and television actress

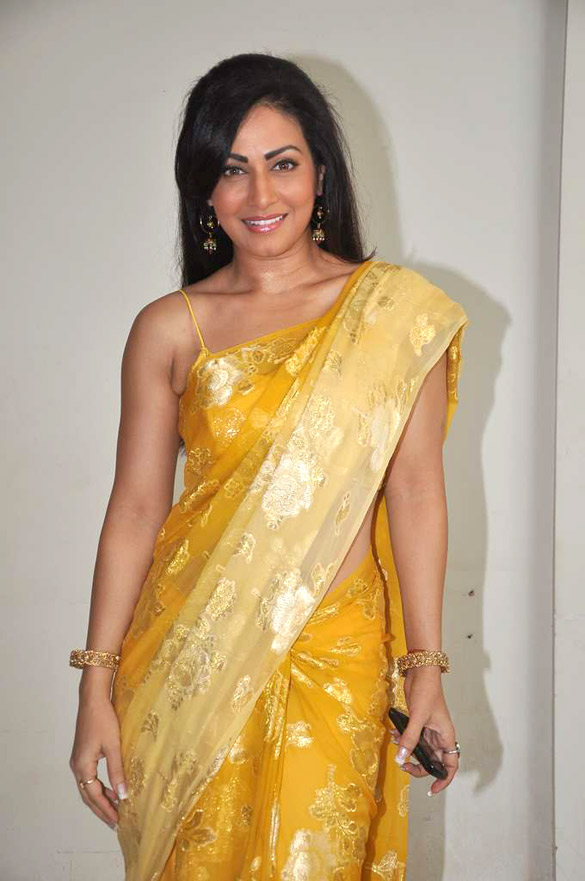
- Hegde at Smt Netaji film launch, 2012
- Born: 7 June 1970 (age 56); Mumbai, Maharashtra, India
- Occupation: Actress
- Years active: 2004–present
- Children: 2

Pakkhi Hegde (born 7 June 1970) is an Indian actress from Mumbai who is active mainly in Hindi serials, Bhojpuri, Tulu and Marathi films.

== Career ==
Pakkhi Hegde, a Tuluva from Mangalore, started her acting career with a lead role in a daily serial, Main Banoongi Miss India on DD National.

She then worked with Manoj Tiwari in Bhaiya Hamar Dayavaan, Paramveer Parsuram and Ganga Jamuna Saraswati, and with Pawan Singh in Pyar Mohabbat Zindabaad and Devar Bhabhi.

Hegde worked with Bollywood actor Amitabh Bachchan in the film Ganga Devi. She played the female protagonist in the Marathi film Sat Na Gat, with Sayaji Shinde and Mahesh Manjrekar. She has also done a Tulu film, Bangarda Kural.

== Personal life ==
Hegde has two daughters, Aashna Hedge and Khushi Hegde, and lives in Mumbai with her family.

== Filmography ==
Year	Film	Language
2005	Kyunki its fate	Hindi
2006	Ek Aur Shapat	Bhojpuri
2007	Gawan Le Jaa Raja Ji	Bhojpuri
2007	Kaise Kahi Ki Tohara Se Pyar Ho Gail	Bhojpuri
2008	Nirahua Rikshawala	Bhojpuri
2008	Pariwar	Bhojpuri
2008	Khiladi No. 1	Bhojpuri
2009	Nirahua Ke Prem Ke Rog Bhail	Bhojpuri
2009	Pratigya	Bhojpuri
2010	Nirahua No. 1	Bhojpuri
2010	Shiva	Bhojpuri
2010	Saat Saheliyan	Bhojpuri
2010	Aaj Ke Karan Arjun	Bhojpuri
2010	Dil	Bhojpuri
2010	Hamara Mati Me Dum Ba	Bhojpuri
2011	Mai Nagin Tu Nagina	Bhojpuri
2011	Dushmani	Bhojpuri
2011	Nirahua Chalal Sasural	Bhojpuri
2011	Nirahua Mail	Bhojpuri
2012	Ganga Jamuna Saraswati	Bhojpuri
2012	Deewana	Bhojpuri
2012	Aakhari Rasta	Bhojpuri
2012	Daag	Bhojpuri
2012	Khoon Pasina	Bhojpuri
2012	Bhaiya Hamar Dayavaan	Bhojpuri
2012	Ganga Devi	Bhojpuri
2012	Bangarda Kural	Tulu
2013	Aakhari Balwan	Bhojpuri
2013	Sat Na Gat	Marathi
2013	Pawan Purvaiya	Bhojpuri
2013	Paramveer Parsuram	Bhojpuri
2013	Hunter wali	Bhojpuri
2014	Lofer	Bhojpuri
2014	Mawali	Bhojpuri
2014	Khoon Bhari Hamar Mang	Bhojpuri
2014	Laheriya Luta Ae Raja	Bhojpuri
2014	Aaulad	Bhojpuri
2014	Maine Dil Tujhko Diya	Bhojpuri
2014	Pyar Mohabbat Zindabaad	Bhojpuri
2014	Devar Bhabhi	Bhojpuri
2014	Jaani Dushman	Bhojpuri
2014	Nirahua Hindustani	Bhojpuri
2014	Devra Bhail Deewana	Bhojpuri
2014	A Balma Bihar Wala 2	Bhojpuri
2014	Gulabi	Marathi
2015	Dushmani	Bhojpuri
2015	Gola Barood	Bhojpuri
2015	Muqabala	Bhojpuri
2015	Kudesan (Woman from the east)	Punjabi
2015	Kala Sach - The Black Truth	Hindi
2016	Neti Vijethalu	Telugu
2016	Rani Dilbar Jani	Bhojpuri
2016	Balma Bihar wala 2	Bhojpuri
2017	Aakhari Faisala	Bhojpuri
2017	Pawan Raja	Bhojpuri
2019	Vivah	Bhojpuri

== Television ==
Year	Serial	Role	Channel
2004–2007	Main Banoongi Miss India	Suhani Sahay	DD National
2022–2023	Rajjo	Madhumalati Pratap Singh Thakur	Star Plus

== Awards ==
- Red FM Tulu Film Award 2014 – Best Actress for Bangarda Kural
- Tulu Cinemotsava Awards 2015 – Best Actress for Bangarda Kural
