= Mr. Painter =

2009 Indian movie

- VCD cover
- Directed by: Dinesh Baboo
- Written by: Dinesh Baboo
- Produced by: Umesh Banakar; A Ganesh
- Starring: Rangayana Raghu; Sharan
- Cinematography: Dinesh Baboo
- Edited by: Narahalli Jnanesh
- Music by: G R Shankar
- Production company: Om Sri Chamundeshwari Films
- Release date: 17 July 2009
- Country: India
- Language: Kannada

Mr. Painter is a 2009 Indian Kannada-language comedy drama film directed by Dinesh Baboo and starring Yogesh in a cameo, Rangayana Raghu and Sharan. The film was released to negative reviews and was a box office failure.

== Cast ==
- Yogesh (guest appearance)
- Rangayana Raghu
- Sharan
- Ravishankar Gowda
- Shivadhwaj
- Srinivasa Murthy
- Jai Jagadish
- Ramanithu Chaudhary
- Ashalatha
- Veena Sundar

== Production ==
Part of the film was shot in Sakleshpura. The film was shot in ten days.

== Soundtrack ==
The music was composed by Orata I Love You-fame G R Shankar.

== Reception ==
A critic from Bangalore Mirror wrote that "There is too much effort to make the scenes comical which fails. Mr Painter is a wasted effort overall. The film seems like an effort to make quick money with the least usage of efforts". R. G. Vijayasarathy of IANS wrote that "Watch Mr. Painter for Sharan, but you should have lot of patience".
