= Gaggara =

Indian drama film

- Poster
- Directed by: Shivadhwaj Shetty
- Written by: Shivadhwaj Shetty
- Produced by: M. Durganand
- Starring: Suchendra Prasad; Jayasheela
- Cinematography: Suresh Bhairasandra
- Edited by: K. M. Prakash
- Production company: D M Cine Creations
- Release date: 2008
- Country: India
- Language: Tulu
- Budget: ₹11 lakhs

Gaggara is a 2008 Indian Tulu-language drama film written and directed by Shivadhwaj Shetty and starring Suchendra Prasad and Jayasheela. The film is based on Bhoothakola, and won the National Film Award for Best Feature Film in Tulu. The film was notably the first Tulu film to be screened at the Indian Panorama section of the International Film Festival of India in 2009 and the Bengaluru International Film Festival in 2011.

== Plot ==
Shankara is the son of a Kola performer, which has become a dying tradition. He is a government school teacher and is hesitant to perform the ritual since the modern day society shuns the Kola community (who are considered untouchables). He is from a poor family and his father is a drunkard who wastes money.

Eventually, Shankara performs Kola for the first time in order to keep the dying tradition alive.

== Cast ==
- Suchendra Prasad as Shankara
- Jayasheela
- M. K. Mutt
- Naveen D. Padil
- Sundara Rai Mandara
- Vinnie Fernades
- Bhaskar Manipal
- Sandeep Udupi

== Production ==
The film was shot in seven days in Palli, a village near Karkala in Udupi district.

== Release ==
Upon release, the film was a box office failure due to being a socially oriented film. The film was not released on CDs.
