= Hagalu Vesha =

- Theatrical release poster
- Directed by: Baraguru Ramachandrappa
- Written by: Baraguru Ramachandrappa
- Produced by: B. Jagannath; Manjunath
- Starring: Shiva Rajkumar; Reshma; Tara
- Cinematography: P. Rajan
- Edited by: Suresh Urs
- Music by: Hamsalekha
- Production company: A Entertainers
- Release date: 24 March 2000
- Running time: 144 minutes
- Country: India
- Language: Kannada

Hagalu Vesha (transl. Disguising in day time) is a 2000 Indian Kannada-language film directed, written and scripted by Baraguru Ramachandrappa starring Shiva Rajkumar and Reshma. It is the story of a man who revolts against the British rule and their taxation policy.

The film was critically acclaimed upon release and won numerous State awards. The music composed by Hamsalekha was also received positively.

== Cast ==
- Shiva Rajkumar as Ramu
- Reshma
- Tara
- Jai Jagadish
- Nassar
- Pramila Joshai
- Bhavyasri Rai
- Karibasavaiah
- M. S. Umesh
- Krishne Gowda
- Aravind

== Production ==
The film was launched on 16 November 1998. The filming was held at Tumkur district.

== Soundtrack ==
The music of the film was composed and lyrics written by Hamsalekha. Actor Rajkumar recorded a patriotic song "Jaggadu Jaggadu India" which became huge hit.

Hagalu Vesha

Soundtrack album by Hamsalekha
- Released: February 2000
- Genre: Feature film soundtrack
- Label: Akash Audio

No.	Title	Lyrics	Singer(s)	Length
1.	"Beladingala Benne"	Baraguru Ramachandrappa	Rajesh Krishnan, K. S. Chithra
2.	"Entha Entha Veshano"	Baraguru Ramachandrappa	Ravi Sai
3.	"Sadaarame Sadaarame"	Baraguru Ramachandrappa	S. P. Balasubrahmanyam
4.	"Baaro Baa Baaro"	Baraguru Ramachandrappa	Hamsalekha, Ramesh Chandra, Latha Hamsalekha
5.	"Maaya Jinke"	Baraguru Ramachandrappa	Ramesh Chandra, K. S. Chithra
6.	"Anna Itta Manege"	Baraguru Ramachandrappa	Ramesh Chandra
7.	"Thundu Naadina"	Baraguru Ramachandrappa	Rajesh Krishnan
8.	"Jaggadu Jaggadu"	Baraguru Ramachandrappa	Rajkumar

== Reception ==
India Info wrote "The hard effort of the director is seen in all the departments and he gets in the required support to make this a wholesome entertainer. In the midst of remake films & low quality Kannada films, this one by Baraguru is a boon and lifts the sagging image of Kannada films". Online Bangalore wrote "The producers of the film had spared no efforts to make a good and commercially viable film. But all these efforts have gone in vain, and what comes out is an ordinary fair. The only saving grace is the rural based ethnic dialogues and lyrics of Baraguru Ramachandrappa which stands apart from the run of the mill stuff. But there is another itch here. Sometimes there is no coherence between the character and the dialogues that he utters on the screen.".

== Awards ==
Karnataka State Film Awards

- Best Story — Baraguru Ramachandrappa
- Best Lyricist — Baraguru Ramachandrappa

Asianet Kaveri Film Awards

- Best Screenplay — Baraguru Ramachandrappa
