= Main Banoongi Miss India =

- Genre: Entertainment
- Written by: Iqbal Munshi
- Directed by: Rupesh D Gohil
- Original languages: Hindi; English
- No. of episodes: 157

Production
- Producer: Rupesh D Gohil
- Camera setup: Multi Camera
- Production company: RDG Productions

Original release
- Network: DD National
- Release: 19 May 2004 – 16 May 2007

Miss India is an Indian television drama series that aired on DD National from 19 May 2004 to 16 May 2007 on Wednesdays. The series, starring Pakhi Hegde, Shilpa Shinde, Seema Kapoor, Dalip Tahil, Prithvi Zutshi and Vinod Kambli, was directed and produced by Rupesh D Gohil. The story of the serial revolves around a small town girl and her struggle to live a life with dignity. Her journey of life eventually brings her to the glamorous world of modelling.

== Plot ==
Suhani Sahay is a small-town girl living in a Mumbai chawl with her mother Savitri and a brother who is married to a rich business woman, Sanjana Gujral. Sanjana, along with her father, runs a media company, 'Queen's International'. She dislikes her in-laws' family for their middle-class status and wants her husband to stay at her house. She and her father use him for their mean purposes. She also starts misbehaving and torturing them emotionally and sometimes physically, but Suhani tries to ignore and forget for the sake of her brother. Later, he discovers his wife and her father's motives and decides to intervene. When confronted, Sanjana gets into fight with him and she and her father decide to kill him, and they do, leaving Suhani and her mother devastated. They decide to leave the city and go to their hometown, but not before Suhani gathers courage and assures her mother about revenge and to fulfill her brother's unaccomplished wishes.

Meanwhile, she starts working in a firm to earn living, while her struggle with Sanjana continues. One day, Suhani comes across another rich and self-made business woman, Devyani Chauhan, who happens to be Sanjana's step-sister. She was left by her father as a child along with her mother and now wants to take revenge from her father. She runs a firm, 'Sandhya Advertising Media'. She learns about Suhani and her ordeal and decides to help her in her fight against Sanjana and her father. Devyani confides in Suhani. She wants Suhani to become a new face of her media company and consistently follows up with her for the same. Initially hesitating, Suhani gives in to Devyani's demands and becomes the new ambassador for the firm. As her journey of fashion world starts leaping high, Devyani enters Suhani for the Miss India contest. In the journey, she faces many hurdles because of Sanjana. After all the odds and evens, Suhani is crowned Miss India.

== Cast ==
- Pakhi Hegde as Suhani Sahay
- Shilpa Shinde as Sanjana Gujral / Sanjana Rajeev Sahay
- Sunila Karambelkar as Sanjana Gujral (after plastic surgery)
- Amit Sadh
- Rahul Nanda as Rajeev Sahay (Suhani's elder brother; Sanjana's husband) / Babu
- Farida Dadi as Savitri Sahay (Suhani and Rajeev's mother)
- Prithvi Zutshi as Kamalkant Gujral (Devyani and Sanjana's father)
- Shweta Kawatra as Roopa
- Dalip Tahil as Digvijay Singh Chandel
- Vinod Kambli
- Seema Kapoor as Devyani Chauhan
- Kapil Soni as Karan Dhanrajgir
- Melissa Pais as Kamya
- Raj Hussain
- Bharati Sharma
- Jeetendra Trehan
- Meghna Malik
- Dinesh Ojha
- Ruma Bhaduri
- Daljeet Soundh
