= Habba =

- DVD cover
- Directed by: D. Rajendra Babu
- Written by: B. A. Madhu (Dialogues)
- Screenplay by: D. Rajendra Babu
- Story by: J. K. Bharavi
- Produced by: Nara Bharathi Devi
- Starring: Vishnuvardhan; Jaya Prada; Ambareesh; Shashikumar; Urvashi; Devaraj; Ramkumar
- Cinematography: P. K. H. Das
- Edited by: T. Shashikumar
- Music by: Hamsalekha
- Production company: Chinni Chitra
- Distributed by: Ramu Films
- Release date: 16 April 1999
- Running time: 2 hours 22 minutes
- Country: India
- Language: Kannada

Habba (transl. Festival) is a 1999 Indian Kannada-language drama film written and directed by D. Rajendra Babu. The film has an ensemble cast including Vishnuvardhan, Ambareesh, Devaraj, Jayapradha, Urvashi, Shashikumar, Ramkumar, Vijayalakshmi, Kasthuri and Charulatha. The movie was produced by Bharathi Devi for Chinni Chitra productions. The movie became a blockbuster and ran for more than 25 weeks. The film was remade in Telugu in 2002 as Chandravamsam starring Krishna. The movie was loosely based on the Pandavas's exile episode in the Virata Parva of Mahabharata.

== Cast ==
- Vishnuvardhan as Vishnu
- Jayapradha as Laxmi
- Ambareesh as Ambi
- Urvashi as Mandodari
- Devaraj as Devu
- Kasthuri as Anu
- Shashikumar as Shashi
- Charulatha as Savitri
- Ramkumar as Ram
- Vijayalakshmi as Seetha
- Leelavathi as grandmother
- Pavithra Lokesh
- Padma Vasanthi
- Ashok Rao
- Ashalatha
- M. S. Umesh
- Bank Janardhan
- Negro Johnny
- Nagendra Babu
- Ravi Babu
- Kazan Khan
- M. S. Umesh
- A. V. Ravi (Jim)
- Manjunath Hegde
- Bank Suresh
- Govindu
- Sreeraksha Shivakumar
- Suneetha Shetty
- Bullet Nagaraj

== Production ==
The film was launched on 5 January 1999 at Neeladri Amusement Park. The film finished shooting as of March 1999.

== Soundtrack ==
The music of the film was composed and lyrics were written by Hamsalekha. Popular playback singer Nanditha made her entry into film songs with this soundtrack. The song "Habba Habba" is a slightly modified version of the song "Yele Hombisile" which Hamsalekha had composed for the film Halunda Thavaru. All the songs in the film become chartbusters.

Habba

Soundtrack album by Hamsalekha
- Released: February 1999
- Genre: Feature film soundtrack
- Label: Anand Audio

| No. | Title | Lyrics | Singer(s) | Length |
|---|---|---|---|---|
| 1. | "Channappa Channegowda" | Hamsalekha | Rajesh Krishnan, K. S. Chithra, Ramesh Chandra, Vishnu | 05:32 |
| 2. | "Aarathi Yettire" | Hamsalekha | Nanditha | 03:00 |
| 3. | "Dheem Takita" | Hamsalekha | S. P. Balasubrahmanyam, K. S. Chithra | 04:58 |
| 4. | "Habba Habba" | Hamsalekha | Rajesh Krishnan, Ramesh Chandra, Nanditha | 04:57 |
| 5. | "Jenina Goodu" | Hamsalekha | Rajesh Krishnan, K. S. Chithra | 05:25 |
| 6. | "Koti Koti Devaru" | Hamsalekha | Nanditha | 01:52 |
| 7. | "Mama Mama Masti" | Hamsalekha | S. P. Balasubrahmanyam | 05:04 |
| 8. | "Mai Tholiyo Shastra" | Hamsalekha | Nanditha | 01:26 |
| 9. | "Yaale Yaale" | Hamsalekha | Rajesh Krishnan, K. S. Chithra | 05:15 |

== Reception ==
The New Indian Express called the film "a beautiful mansion without proper foundation". Deccan Herald wrote "this film stands out for its effort to infuse new life into the narration and proceedings."

== Awards ==
Karnataka State Film Awards 1999-00

- Karnataka State Film Award for Best Screenplay - D. Rajendra Babu
