= Beauty (2026 film) =

2026 Indian Kannada language film

- Poster
- Directed by: Raja Ravikumar
- Produced by: Thanuja Murali Krishna
- Starring: Ravikanth; Mahalakshmi
- Cinematography: Viresh S
- Edited by: Madhu Tumbakere
- Music by: V. Manohar
- Production company: Kalpavruksha Productions
- Release date: 10 July 2026
- Country: India
- Language: Kannada

Beauty is a 2026 Indian Kannada language film directed by Raja Ravikumar. The film stars Ravikanth and Mahalakshmi in the lead roles.

== Cast ==
- Ravikanth Poojary as Vishnu
- Mahalakshmi as Lakshmi
- Veni
- Chiller Manja
- Anekal Muniyappa
- Annapoorna Tholisetti
- Manmohan Rai
- Anjana S
- Shivamogga Ramanna

== Reception ==
Susmita Sameera of The Times of India said that"Beauty is an earnest attempt at combining a murder mystery with family drama and an emotional message. Although its tonal inconsistencies limit its effectiveness, viewers looking for a sentimental family drama may watch." A. Sharadhaa of the Cinema Express said that "Beauty begins with a striking thought, a philosophy rich enough to sustain an entire film. Even though the director has something meaningful to say, what is missing is the discipline to translate that conviction into compelling cinema. Beauty remains a film that says the right things but rarely says them most effectively." Y. Maheswara Reddy of the Bangalore Mirror said that "Veteran music director V Manohar has done a fantastic job. The movie would have been a good entertainer had the director reduced the runtime by 20 minutes. It is worth a watch for suspense thriller lovers."
