= Ramkumar =

Indian actor and film producer

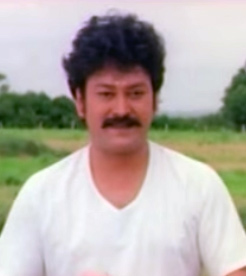
- Ramkumar in Sri Naga Shakthi (2011)
- Born: 3 December 1968 (age 57)
- Occupation: Actor - film producer
- Years active: 1990–2013; 2021–present
- Spouse: Poornima
- Children: 2
- Father: Shringar Nagaraj
- Relatives: Rajkumar family

Ramkumar is an Indian actor and film producer known for his work in Kannada cinema also appeared in few Tamil and Telugu films, He made his acting debut in Peraala's 1990 action film Aavesha. The same year, he played a small role in Rajendra Singh Babu's Muthina Haara (1990). With his good looks, he was considered one of the "chocolate heroes" of the 1990s. As of 2013, Ramkumar has acted in over 40 Kannada feature films. His acting skills are well-appreciated. He has produced the film Pandavaru (2006) in which he has acted as well.

== Personal life ==
Ramkumar is the son of Shringar Nagaraj, a popular actor who was also the producer of the critically acclaimed Pushpaka Vimana (1987). Ramkumar is married to Poornima, the daughter of Dr. Rajkumar. They have two children who are both aspiring actors: daughter Dhanya Ramkumar and son Dheeren.

== Career ==
Ramkumar was an avid movie buff in his childhood. He first starred in action film Aavesha (1990). The film was a hit at the box office. It was followed by the epic Muthina Haara, directed by Rajendra Singh Babu and starring Vishnuvardhan and Suhasini.

Ramkumar Starred a full-fledged hero in Gejje Naada (1993) opposite newcomer Shwetha. The film was declared a musical hit and his performance was lauded. This was followed by the devotional film Bhagawan Sri Saibaba, with ensemble cast. Ramkumar starred in a large number of films during 1994-96 like Kavya, Thayi Illada Thavaru, Thavarina Thottilu and Gaaya that were successful and others like B. C. Patil's Poorna Sathya, that were not.

In 1999, Ramkumar played pivotal roles in multi-starrer films Snehaloka and Habba that proved successful. Facing flops subsequently he turned producer with Pandavaru in 2006. A multi-starrer with a host of prominent stars and a remake of Hulchul, Pandavaru proved to be an average grosser at the box office.

Ramkumar made a comeback in 2021 with Sheegrameva Kalyana Praptirastu. Directed by Praveen Channappa, it features Ramkumar as Krishnappa, a professor.

== Filmography ==
- Note: all films are in Kannada, unless otherwise noted.

Year	Film	Role	Notes
1990	Aavesha		
1990	Muthina Haara	Naik Mohan	
1991	Manasara Vazhthungalen		Tamil film
1992	Government Mappillai	Karthikeyan	Tamil film
1993	Gejje Naada		
1993	Bhagavan Sri Saibaba	Tatya Patil	
1994	Poorna Satya		
1994	Mahakshathriya		
1995	State Rowdy		
1995	Kavya	Dr. Prasad	
1995	Thaliya Sowbhagya		
1995	Thaayi Illada Thavaru		
1995	Sathya Jwale		
1995	Hosa Baduku		
1995	Shravana Sanje	Chandru	
1995	Giddu Dada		
1996	Gaaya		
1996	Thavarina Thottilu		
1996	Gulaabi		
1996	Pooja		
1996	Surya Puthra		
1997	Jenina Hole		
1997	April Fool		
1997	Nee Mudida Mallige		
1998	Vajra		
1998	Thavarina Kanike		
1999	Habba	Ram	
1999	Snehaloka	Ramkumar	
1999	No.1		
1999	Aahaa	Raghu	
1999	Arundathi		Telugu film
1999	Naanenu Madlilla	Inspector Harish	
2000	Premi		
2000	Swalpa Adjust Madkolli		
2000	Gaajina Mane		
2001	Ellara Mane Dosenu		
2001	Avaran Bit Ivaran Bit Avaryaru	Narasimha	
2001	Sarovara	Santosh	
2001	Aunty Preethse		
2002	Punjabi House		
2002	Manase O Manase		
2003	Kushalave Kshemave	Varada	
2004	Saagari		
2005	Abhinandane		
2006	Pandavaru		
2008	Navashakthi Vaibhava	Vishnu	
2009	Jodi No.1		
2011	Sri Naga Shakthi	Sheshanna	
2013	Sri Kshetra Adi Chunchanagiri		
2021	Sheegrameva Kalyana Prapthirasthu	Krishnappa	

== See also ==
- List of people from Karnataka
- List of Indian film actors
