= Janumada Jodi =

1996 Kannada film by T. S. Nagabharana

- Poster
- Directed by: T. S. Nagabharana
- Written by: Baraguru Ramachandrappa (dialogues)
- Screenplay by: T. S. Nagabharana
- Story by: Pannalal Patel
- Based on: Malela Jeev by Pannalal Patel
- Produced by: Parvathamma Rajkumar
- Starring: Shiva Rajkumar; Shilpa
- Cinematography: B. C. Gowrishankar
- Edited by: T. Shashikumar
- Music by: V. Manohar
- Production company: Vaishnavi Combines
- Release date: 15 November 1996
- Country: India
- Language: Kannada
- Budget: ₹ 62 lakh
- Box office: ₹ 22 crore

Janumada Jodi is a 1996 Indian Kannada-language romantic drama film directed by T. S. Nagabharana and written by Baraguru Ramachandrappa, based on Pannalal Patel's 1941 Gujarati novel Malela Jeev. The film was scripted by T. S. Nagabharana. The film stars Shiva Rajkumar and Shilpa in lead roles, while Pavithra Lokesh, Mukhyamantri Chandru and Honnavalli Krishna plays supporting roles. The film's plot follows Krishna (Shiva Rajkumar) and Kanaka (Shilpa), who fall in love despite belonging to different castes. The film follows the troubles they face in their love story.

The film was produced by Shiva Rajkumar's mother Parvathamma Rajkumar under the banner of Vaishnavi Combines. The film was based on the 1941 romance novel, Malela Jeev by Pannalal Patel. The book was adopted into a film once, before, in 1956 in Gujarathi. The film features original songs composed by V. Manohar. The cinematography of the film was done by B. C. Gowrishankar, while the editing was handled by T. Shashikumar. The film was made on a relatively low budget, compared to other films at the time.

The film was released on 15 November 1996 to widespread critical acclaim. The film was the highest-grossing film of the year and was an industry hit. The film ran in all major centers for more than a year. The film won five Karnataka State Film Awards that year for- Best Actress (Shilpa), Best Music Director (V. Manohar), Best Male Playback Singer (L. N. Shastry), Best Lyricist (Doddarange Gowda) and the Jury's Special Award (Parvathamma Rajkumar). The film won four Filmfare Awards South for- Best Film (Parvathamma Rajkumar), Best Director (T. S. Nagabharana), Best Actress (Shilpa) and Best Music Director (V. Manohar). The film was a breakthrough for Shilpa, who went on to become one of the most sought after actresses in Kannada cinema.

== Cast ==
- Shiva Rajkumar as Krishna
- Shilpa as Kanaka
- Enagi Balappa as a Swami
- Amulya
- Pavitra Lokesh as Mani
- Rajeev as Singarigowda
- Ashok as Ramanna
- Mukhyamantri Chandru as Tammadi
- Karibasavaiah as Andani
- Krishnegowda
- Honnavalli Krishna as Bangaru
- Arun Sagar
- Ramu
- Mandya Ramesh
- Shani Mahadevappa
- Jayakumar
- Rajashekar Kadamba
- Dr Sindhuvalli Ananthamurthy
- Chandrappa
- Mysore Anand
- Suma Jagadish
- Radha Ramachandra
- Shobha Raghavendra
- Jyothi Bantwal as Lakshmi
- Vasundhara Maggavi
- Parvathi Lokesh
- Shivakumar

== Production ==
Popular Malayalam actress Chippy made her Kannada debut with this film. Cinematographer B. C. Gowrishankar picturised the song "Mani Mani" in the sunset for nine days as the sunset lasted for only a few minutes. Stage actor Mandya Ramesh also made his acting debut with this film.

The film was shot in Mahadevapura near Mysore. Praising Parvathamma's finance management skills, director Nagabharana recalled that she had hired two production managers who would give the estimated expense of each of the scenes conceived by him. She would add an additional 20 per cent on that and would ask the technicians whether it would be sufficient. Once the budget was agreed upon, she would see that it was never overshot.

== Soundtrack ==
Janumada Jodi

Soundtrack album by V. Manohar
- Released: 1996
- Genre: Feature film soundtrack
- Length: 42:29
- Label: Akash Audio

V. Manohar composed the film's background score and music for its soundtrack, while also writing the lyrics for some tracks. The soundtrack album comprises nine tracks. All the tracks of the album were chartbusters. The film was a musical hit. The tune of the song Kolumande Jangama was used as Jai Veeranjaneya in the Telugu movie Idiot which was a remake of another Kannada movie Appu.

Track listing
No.	Title	Lyrics	Singer(s)	Length
1.	"Aarathi Annammange"	Doddarange Gowda	Rajesh Krishnan, Manjula Gururaj	4:25
2.	"Dehavendare O Manuja"	V. Manohar	Rajkumar	4:52
3.	"Ivan Yaara Magano"	V. Manohar	Rajesh Krishnan, Manjula Gururaj	4:51
4.	"Januma Jodi Aadaru"	V. Manohar	Rajkumar	4:47
5.	"Janumada Jodi Neenu"	Doddarange Gowda	Rajesh Krishnan, Manjula Gururaj	5:02
6.	"Kolumande Jangama"	Doddarange Gowda	L. N. Shastri	4:29
7.	"Mani Mani Mani"	Baraguru Ramachandrappa	Shiva Rajkumar, Manjula Gururaj	5:02
8.	"Oora Dyavre"	V. Manohar	Manjula Gururaj	4:45
9.	"Seere Seere Seere"	Sriranga	Sangeetha Katti	4:16
Total length:				42:29

== Release ==

The film was released on 15 November 1996 to highly positive reviews.

The film had a theatrical run of more than 365 days in maximum centres across Hubbali, Belgavi and Bijapur. Janumada Jodi holds the record for silver jubilee run in maximum number (5) of film halls in Bengaluru. According to director Nagabharana, the movie saw a combined run of 2 years in 25 centres.

== Awards and honours ==
Award	Award category - Winner	Ref.
44th Filmfare Awards South	Best Film - Parvathamma Rajkumar (Producer); Best Director - T. S. Nagabharana; Filmfare Award for Best Actress – Kannada - Shilpa; Best Music Director - V. Manohar	
Karnataka State Film Awards	Jury's Special Award - Parvathamma Rajkumar (Producer); Karnataka State Film Award for Best Actress - Shilpa; Best Music Director - V. Manohar; Best Male Playback Singer - L. N. Shastry; Best Lyricist - Doddarange Gowda ( "Kolumande Jangama" )	

== Legacy ==
The film became a subject for study in the humanities by an American University. Amala Akkineni once mentioned that when her son Akhil Akkineni was a kid, he could sleep only by listening to the song Kolumande Jangama.
