= Sri Naga Shakthi =

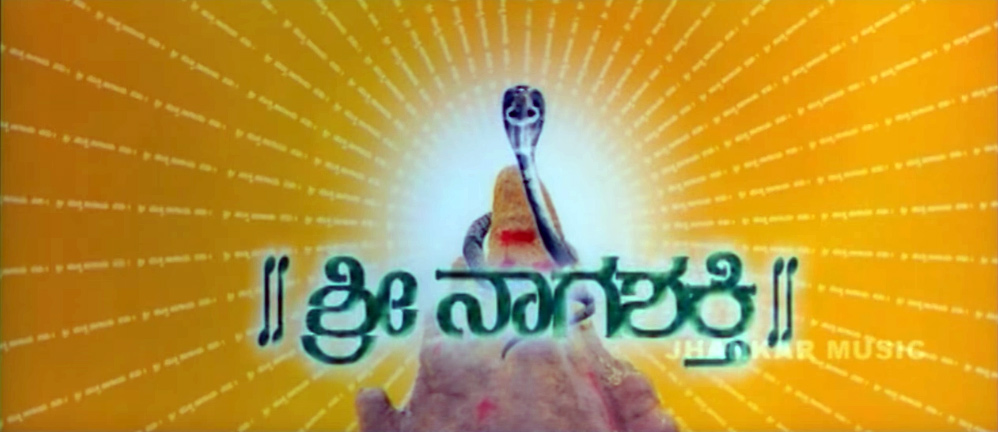
- Film poster
- Directed by: Om Sai Prakash
- Produced by: K J Bharathi
- Starring: Ramkumar; Shruthi; Shivakumar
- Cinematography: C. Narayan
- Edited by: M. Muniraj
- Music by: Sri Ganesh
- Production company: Sri Sai Rameshwara Films
- Release date: 7 January 2011
- Running time: 132 minutes
- Country: India
- Language: Kannada

Sri Naga Shakthi is a 2011 Indian Kannada film starring Shruthi and Ramkumar in the lead roles. The film has been directed and written by Om Sai Prakash. Actress Chandrika has produced the film under her home banner. The film has been in the cans for many years and has finally released on 7 January 2011. The film has received negative reviews from critics owing to its old age story.

== Plot ==
The film deals with the revenge story of a snake God with admired family.

== Cast ==
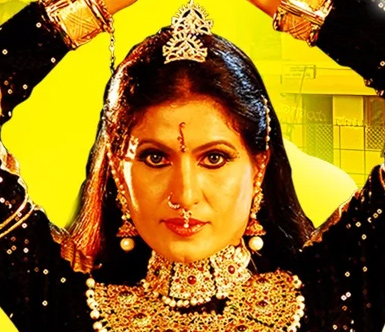
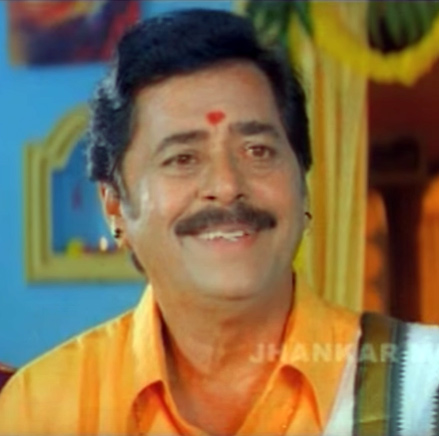
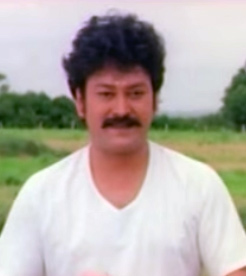
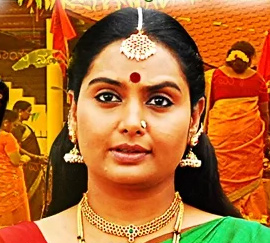
(top, L–R) Cast of film, Chandrika, Ramesh Bhat, Ramkumar, Shruti
- Ramkumar as Sheshanna
- Shruthi
- Shivakumar as Naganna
- Abhijith
- Tennis Krishna
- Chandrika
- Sangeetha as Kanakavalli
- Karibasavaiah
- Bullet Prakash
- Ramesh Bhat
- Baby Krithika
- Chitra Shenoy

== Soundtrack ==
Song	Singer	Lyrics
"Shubhadayini"	Remo, K. S. Chithra	Goturi
"Halaravi Thandevu"	Sri Ganesh, Ranjitha	Goturi
"Girija Kalyana"	Remo, Archana, Ravisanthosh	Goturi
"Naaga Nruthya"	Thangali Nagaraj, Archana, Ranjitha	Goturi
"Baaramma Olidu"	Badri Prasad, Priyadarshini	Goturi
"Sri Nagashakthiye"	K. S. Chithra	Goturi

== Reception ==
A critic from The Times of India wrote that "This is a film that highlights how god helps you in troubled times. Woven around many fantasies, the movie may thrill you if you are a believer in god".
