= Shanti (film) =

- Bhavana in the film
- Directed by: Baraguru Ramachandrappa
- Written by: Baraguru Ramachandrappa
- Produced by: Ramesh Yadav
- Starring: Bhavana
- Cinematography: Nagaraj Adavani
- Edited by: Suresh Urs
- Music by: Hamsalekha
- Distributed by: Ramesh Yadav Movies
- Release date: 4 March 2005 (India)
- Running time: 120 minutes
- Country: India
- Language: Kannada

Shanti (English: Peace) is a 2005 Indian Kannada-language drama film directed by Baraguru Ramachandrappa. The film features only a single actor (Bhavana) and hence has found an entry in the Guinness World Records in the category "Fewest actors in a narrative film".

== Plot ==
The only character in the film is of an illustrator and a painter called as Shanti. An international peace body chooses her to create the logo of a world peace conference. In order to draw inspiration, Shanti travels to a picturesque hilly area where she gets accosted by a group of terrorists. They kidnap her and put forth a demand that she should take them to the conference as her assistants. Their ultimate plan is to blow up the conference hall. The main storyline of the film is the way in which Shanti solves this problem and saves the conference.

From the storyline, it seems that more than one actor is required on the screen. However, Baraguru has handled this by showing only the character of Shanti on the screen while the remaining characters only contribute in terms of their voices.

== Cast ==
- Bhavana as Shanti
  - She also briefly portrayed Mahatma Gandhi and the Buddha.

Bhavana is the sole actor. The other characters in the film were only represented by symbols and voices. A dove in the film is used as a symbol for peace and guns are used to portray war and terror. A voice over the telephone represents a character called as Samara (a term that means war in Kannada).

== Production and themes ==
Baraguru Ramachandrappa decided to direct this film to portray different faces of peace by juxtaposing symbolism and monologues. The film was entirely shot in the vicinity of the Nalknad Palace in the Kodagu district of Karnataka. The main theme of the film is to explore the various ways to fight terrorism without any compromise with the human values promoted by the United Nations. The UN was used as a vital aspect in the film since Baragur feels that it is a world body that has created two contradicting influences of war and peace. Baragur indicates that though this was sort of an experiment, experimentation was not the main motivation for producing this film. Rather than the concept, more focus has been given on the creative aspects of the theme. A female character was chosen as the sole actress in the film since peace is generally considered feminine whereas war is more masculine. The film does not end with a moral, something uncommon among Indian movies. This is because Baraguru wanted the audience to start off a discussion to weigh the pros and cons of war against peace.

== Release ==
Baraguru decided to do some innovation in order to promote this film. He realised that due to the unique theme of this film; releasing this film in big theatres would not attract a sizeable audience. He decided to show this film in small towns and villages instead. He decided to travel along the highway between the towns of Bangalore and Belgaum and show this film in places that fall along the way. This unique method was termed as Shanti Chitra Yaatre (travel of the Shanti film). The film saw a fabulous response and in some towns like Davangere and Chitradurga people had to turn back since the film ran house-full. Despite being an art film, around 50000 people are supposed to have seen this film.

== Accolades ==
- Guinness World Records in the category Fewest actors in a narrative film; an award shared with three other films, viz. the 1964 Hindi film Yaadein by Sunil Dutt and the 2002 Malayalam film The Guard starring Kalabhavan Mani and the 2002 French/American film La Dernière Lettre.
- In 2003–04 Karnataka State Film Awards won Second Best Film thereby winning a cash award of Rs. 75,000 and a silver medal.
