= Kudesan =

Kudessan
- Directed by: Jeet Matharru
- Written by: Jatinder Brar
- Based on: The Play "Kudessan" written by Jatinder Brar
- Produced by: Suresh Varsani & Jeet Matharru
- Starring: Sukhbir Singh; Pakhi Hegde; Nirmal Rishi; Jeet Matharru; Satwant Ball
- Cinematography: Najeeb Khan
- Edited by: Gyanendra Singh
- Music by: Ashutosh Singh
- Release date: 2012
- Running time: 112 minutes
- Country: India
- Languages: Punjabi; Hindi

Kudessan (Punjabi: ਕੁਦੇਸਣ) is a Punjabi film, directed by Jeet Matharru, starring Sukhbir Singh, Pakhi Hegde, Nirmal Rishi and Jeet Matharru in lead roles. It is based on the play written by Jatinder Brar. It was selected for the world premiere and screened at the first Punjabi International Film Festival in Toronto in 2012. Prior to this, the film has been received well in the London Asian Film Festival too. Its Hindi version is titled Woman From The East.

== Plot ==
The film presents the tragic life of a twenty-year-old Bihari girl, Ganga, who is bought by a middle-aged Punjabi man, Pala Singh, in order to have a male child.

The above-mentioned story is a copy of a well known verbal story from Bihar, uttered by a famous composer Bhikhari Thakur also known as "Shakespeare of Bhojpuri". It is a small fraction of a series of stories in the form of lyrics written in 1960s. In his songs, the girl and the old age person are described from Bihar story known to be "Beti Bechawa" Bhojpuri words which means "One who Sells his Daughter". He visited Bengal but never found any evidence of his visit or mentioning Punjab. These newcomers publish their album and give their names.

== Songs ==
Ashutosh Singh composed the songs and the playback singers includes Pappi Gill, Devi, Kailash Kher, Ahan Shah, Shahid.

== Cast ==
- Sukhbir Singh – Pala Singh
- Pakhi Hegde – Ganga/Kudesan
- Nirmal Rishi – Jeeto (Pala Singh's first wife)
- Jeet Matharru - Shera
