= Naanu Gandhi =

- Directed by: Nanjunde Gowda
- Written by: Rajappa Dalavayi (dialogue)
- Screenplay by: Nanjunde Gowda
- Based on: Gandhi by Dr. Ramanna
- Starring: Master Likhith
- Cinematography: Nagaraj
- Edited by: B S Kemparaj
- Music by: V. Manohar; Background music: Raju Upendra Kumar
- Production company: Abhivyakthi Chithra
- Release date: 14 November 2008
- Country: India
- Language: Kannada

Naanu Gandhi (transl. I am Gandhi) is a 2008 Indian Kannada-language children's film directed by Nanjunde Gowda starring Master Likhith in the titular role. The film won the Best Film Award at the Columbia International Film Festival. Likith won the Karnataka State Film Award for Best Child Actor.

== Cast ==
- Master Likhith as Gandhi
- Sadashiva Brahmavar as Rangajja
- Pramila Joshai
- Ramesh Bhat
- Sundar Raj
- Mandya Ramesh as Narayana Murthy
- Raaga Ranga Nagaraj
- Venkatachal
- N.G.E.F. Sri Kantaiah
- Mosale Manjunath
- Master K S Sharath Kumar
- Master Nandan Kumar
- Master Shashank
- Baby Nisha
- Baby Soumya
- Baby Sneha
- Bharathi

== Soundtrack ==
The music was composed by V. Manohar, and the score was composed by Raju Upendra Kumar.

== Reception ==
A critic from The New Indian Express wrote that "Director Nanjunde Gowda fails to feel the pulse of the audience. It is sad that even after his earlier debacle Naanu Neenu Jodi, Gowda failed to realise the importance of comedy, songs and music. The poor quality and lack of richness make it difficult for the audience to sit through". A critic from The Bangalore Mirror wrote that "Naanu Gandhi, promises much but delivers very little, for the serious movie buff as well as for children". On the contrary, R. G. Vijayasarathy of Rediff.com wrote that "In a nutshell, Nanjundegowda should be appreciated for making a clean and sincere film".
