= Bhagirathi (film) =

- Theatrical Poster
- Directed by: Baraguru Ramachandrappa
- Written by: Baraguru Ramchandrappa
- Produced by: B. K. Srinivas
- Starring: Bhavana; Kishore; Srinath; Hema Choudhary
- Cinematography: Harish N. Sondekoppa
- Edited by: Suresh Urs
- Music by: V. Manohar
- Production company: Sri Harsha Productions
- Release date: 8 June 2012
- Running time: 143 minutes
- Country: India
- Language: Kannada

Bhagirathi is a 2012 Indian Kannada drama film written and directed by Baraguru Ramachandrappa. The film stars Bhavana and Kishore in the lead roles with Srinath, Hema Choudhary and Tara in supporting roles. The film is based on a folktale from North Karnataka, "Kerege Haara", which glorifies the sacrifice of a young woman for the sake of her village and her heart-broken husband.

== Plot ==
Bhagirathi (Bhavana) dreams of a tank for her village and inspired by her, Maadevaraya (Kishore), the son of Mallanagowda (Srinath), convinces his father to construct one for the community. When Maadevaraya and Bhagirathi fall in love, class differences come in the way. But when they decide to end their lives, Mallanagowda is moved to solemnise their marriage on the tank's site.

As fate would have it, the tank remains dry and the priest advises Mallanagowda to sacrifice of one of his daughters-in-law. The lot falls on Bhagirathi. On learning what has happened to his young wife, Maadevaraya ends his life in the tank.

== Cast ==
- Bhavana as Bhagirathi
- Kishore as Mahadevaraya
- Srinath as Mallanagowda
- Tara
- Hema Choudhury
- Padma Vasanthi
- Shivadhwaj
- Ravishankar
- Vatsala Mohan

== Soundtrack ==
Bhagirathi

Soundtrack album by V. Manohar
- Released: 20 November 2011
- Recorded: 2011
- Genre: Feature film soundtrack
- Length: 27:14
- Language: Kannada
- Label: Ashwini Media networks
- Producer: V. Manohar

The soundtrack album of the film was released on 20 November 2011 by actor Puneeth Rajkumar in Bangalore. The album consists of six tracks, lyrics for which were written by Baraguru Ramachandrappa for music composed by V. Manohar, who also scored the film's background music.

Track listing
No.	Title	Lyrics	Singer(s)	Length
1.	"Neevu Aaluva"	Baraguru Ramachandrappa	Abhimanyu	4:39
2.	"Beru Ondhukade"	Baraguru Ramachandrappa	Archana Udupa	5:23
3.	"Bandano Bandano"	Baraguru Ramachandrappa	Chinthan Vikas	4:53
4.	"Kerege Haaruva"	Baraguru Ramachandrappa	Kushala S.	2:40
5.	"Henne Henne"	Baraguru Ramachandrappa	Rajesh Krishnan, Anuradha Bhat	4:24
6.	"Kere Yendare"	Baraguru Ramachandrappa	Ravishankar	5:15
Total length:				27:14

== Review ==
IBN Live reviewed the movie and said, "Bhagirathi' is a one time watch". The Hindu review the movie and said "Bhagirathi – Bringing alive a Kannada folktale".

The movie completed 100 days of show.

== Awards ==
- Karnataka State Film Award for Best Actress – Bhavana
- Karnataka State Film Award for Best Lyricist – Baraguru Ramachandrappa
- Karnataka State Film Award for Best Female Playback Singer – Archana Udupa
- Udaya Film Awards for Best Supporting Actress – Tara
