= Ujwaadu =

- Directed by: Kasargod Chinna
- Written by: Gopalakrishna Pai
- Produced by: KJ Dhananjaya; Anuradha Padiyar
- Starring: Shivadhwaj; Neethu; Sadashiva Brahmavar; Srinivas Prabhu; Umashree
- Cinematography: Utpal Nayanar
- Edited by: Suresh Urs
- Music by: V. Manohar
- Production company: Mithra Media Pvt. Ltd
- Release date: 14 October 2011 (India)
- Country: India
- Language: Konkani

Ujwaadu (transl. Light) is a 2011 Indian Konkani film directed by Kasargod Chinna. The film stars Shivadhwaj, Umashree, Sadashiva Brahmavar, Master Srinivas Prabhu and Neethu. It is the third film ever produced in the GSB Konkani language and attempts to showcase Konkani Saraswatha tradition and culture.

Released on 14 October 2011, and with music by V. Manohar, The film was selected for the Bengaluru International Film Festival and won the Karnataka State Film Award for Best Regional Film.

== Plot ==
Ujwaadu depicts the story of simple happy-go-lucky Gowda Saraswat Brahmins way of life with turmoil and struggle within.

== Cast ==
- Shivadhwaj
- Neethu
- Sadashiva Brahmavar
- Srinivas Sheshgiri Prabhu as Gajju
- Umashree
- Sandhya Pai
- Prameela Nesargi
- Dr. Anantha Prabhu
- Shashibhushan Kini
- Prakash Shenoy
- Om Ganesh
- Purnima Suresh
- Sathish Bhat
- Chidananda Kamat
- Mohandas G. Prabhu
- Ganesh Kundler
- Vinayaka Shenoy as Katte's friend

== Production ==
The film is the third film of GSB Konkani language. Prior to its release, the only two GSB Konkani films produced were Tapaswini and Jana Mana.

== Reception ==
A critic from Daijiworld.com wrote, "Ujwaadu entertains. It endears itself to you as you watch it. It is mellow, gentle and indulgent".

== Home media ==
The DVD of the film was released in Muscat, Oman on 22 March 2015.
