= Pannalal Patel =

Indian Gujarati-language writer

Pannalal Nanalal Patel
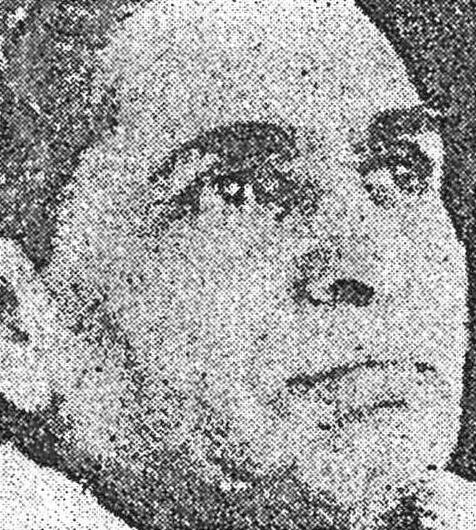
- Born: 7 May 1912; Mandli village British India, (now in Dungarpur, Rajasthan)
- Died: 6 April 1989 (aged 76); Ahmedabad, Gujarat, India
- Occupations: Novelist, short story writer
- Spouse: Valiben
- Writing career
- Notable works: Malela Jeev (1941); Manvini Bhavai (1947)
- Notable awards: Ranjitram Suvarna Chandrak (1950); Jnanpith Award (1985); Sahitya Gaurav Puraskar (1986)

Pannalal Nanalal Patel (7 May 1912 – 6 April 1989) was an Indian author known for his contributions in Gujarati literature. He wrote more than 20 short story collections, such as Sukhdukhna Sathi (1940) and Vatrakne Kanthe (1952), and more than 20 social novels, such as Malela Jeev (1941), Manvini Bhavai (1947) and Bhangyana Bheru (1957), and several mythological novels. He received the Jnanpith Award in 1985. Some of his works were translated as well as adapted into plays and films.

== Life ==
"Life appears to me like that of a spider that makes his own web, using his own saliva. The spider progress through life on the strands of his own web. I, too, have gone about in this world, finding my own ways, learning and changing. what I know of life has come from experience."

— Pannalal Patel

He was born on 7 May 1912 in Mandli village (now in Dungarpur, Rajasthan) to Nanasha a.k.a. Nanalal and Hiraba, an Anjana Chaudhari family. He is youngest among his four siblings. His father was a farmer and used to recite Ramayana, Okhaharan and other mythological stories for his village. This earned his house a nickname "abode of learning". His father died during his childhood and his mother Hiraba raised the children.

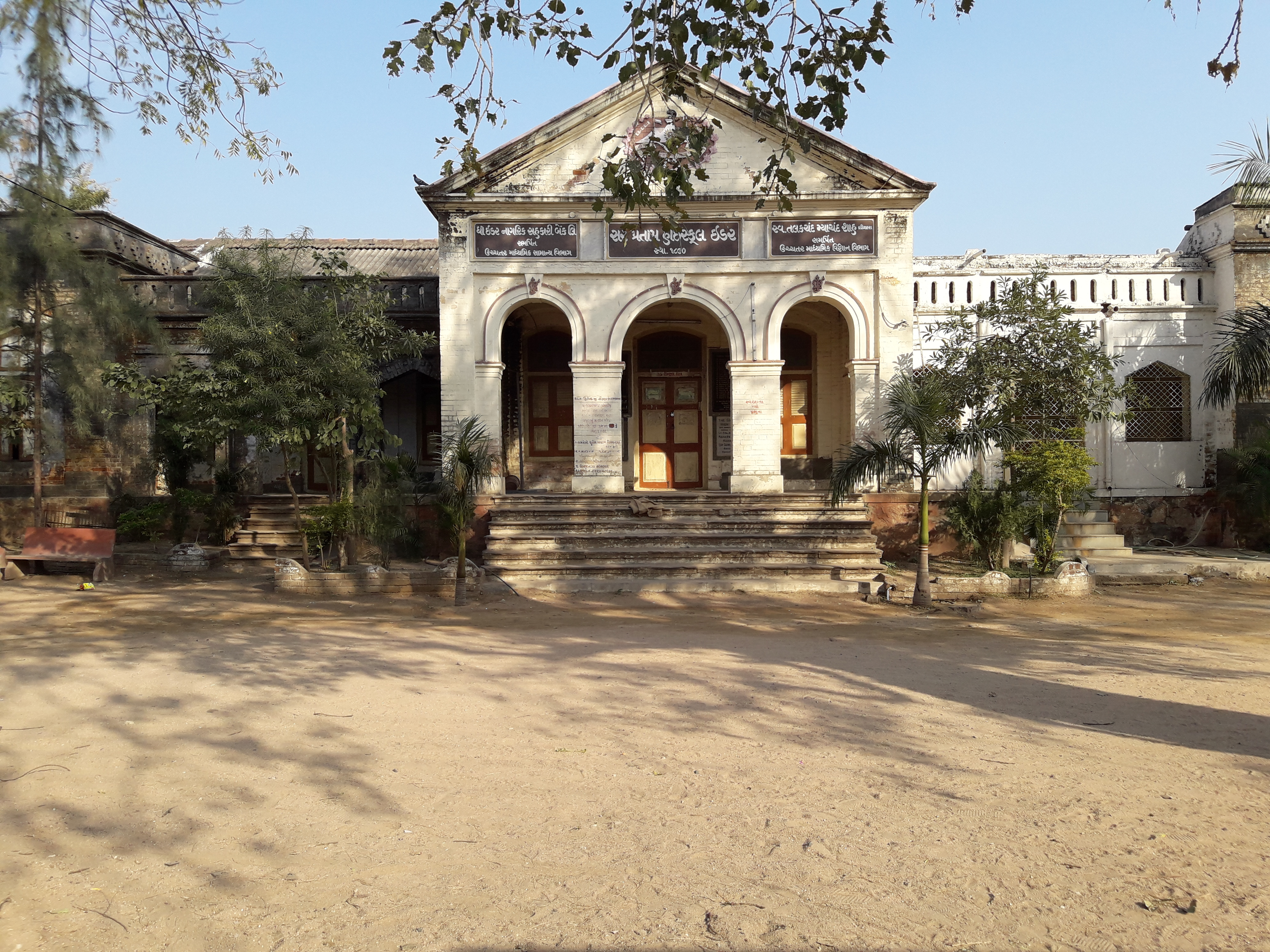
Sir Pratap High School of Idar where Pannalal studied

His education progressed with many difficulties due to poverty. He could study up to only the fourth standard at Sir Pratap High School, Idar. During school days, he befriended his schoolmate Umashankar Joshi. For a brief period, he worked as a manager in a liquor manufacturing company in Dungarpur. He wrote his first novel while working as a domestic help in Ahmedabad, Gujarat.

In 1936, he accidentally met his old friend Umashankar Joshi who persuaded him to write. He wrote his first short story Sheth Ni Sharda (1936). Later, his stories were published in many Gujarati magazines. In 1940, he received recognition for his first novel Valamana (The Send-off), followed by Malela Jeev (1941), Manvini Bhavai (1947) and many other novels. In 1971, he started a publishing company Sadhana in Ahmedabad along with his two sons. During the later years, he mostly wrote novels based on Hindu mythology and epics.

He died on 6 April 1989 in Ahmedabad following brain haemorrhage.

== Works ==
He wrote 61 novels, 26 short story collections and many other works. He wrote his works mostly in the native idioms of Sabarkantha district in north Gujarat.

Love has been central theme of his many novels. He depicted in his works the rural life of Gujarat artificially. His novels are centered around the village, its people, their lives, hopes and aspirations, their problems and predicaments. Malela Jeev (1941), a story of unfulfilled love between Kanji and Jivi having been born in different castes, is considered as one of his best novels. His novel Manvini Bhavai (1947) is rated as most powerful portrayal of Gujarat's rural life and the exploration of rural life during the early 1900s. His novel Na Chhutke (1955) is based on Satyagraha movements of Mahatma Gandhi and it enumerates Gandhi's various endeavours for freedom of India and spiritual uplifting of Indian people. His other novels depicting rural life are Bhangyana Bheru (1957), Ghammar Valonu Vol. 1-2 (1968), Fakiro (1955), Manakhavatar (1961), Karoliyanu Jalu (1963), Meen Matina Manvi (1966), Kanku (1970), Ajavali Rat Amasni (1971). His novels depicting urban life are less entertaining than rural life. Bhiru Sathi (1943) was his first novel. His other novels depicting urban life are Yauvan Vol. 1-2 (1944), Padagha and Padchhaya (1960), Ame Be Baheno Vol. 1-2 (1962), Andhi Ashadhni (1964), Pranayna Jujva Pot (1969), Allad Chhokari (1972), Ek Anokhi Preet (1972), Nathi Paranya Nathi Kunwara (1974), Raw Material (1983). Galalsing (1972) is historical novel of love and valour.

His novels other than theme of love are Pachhale Barane (1947), Vali Vatanma (1966), Eklo (1973), Taag (1979), Pageru (1981). Angaro (1981) is his detective novel. Param Vaishanav Narasinh Mehta and Jene Jivi Janyu (1984) are his biographical novels of Narsinh Mehta and Ravishankar Maharaj respectively. Nagadnarayan (1967) and Marakatlal (1973) are his humorous novels.

During his later years, he wrote stories based on characters of epics, Mahabharata and Ramayana, and Puranas and other Hindu mythological stories. He preserved the original story and its miraculous themes but gave new meanings at several instances. His such works include Parth ne Kaho Chadave Ban Vol. 1-5 (1974), Rame Seetan Marya Jo! Vol. 1-4 (1976), Krishna Jivanleela Vol. 1-5 (1977), Shivaparvati Vol. 1-6 (1979), Bhishmani Banshaiyya Vol. 1-3 (1980), Kach-Devyani (1981), Devyani-Yayayti Vol. 1-2 (1982), Satyabhamano Manushi-Pranaya (1984), (Manavdehe) Kamdev Rati (1984), (Mahabharatano Pratham Pranay) Bheem-Hidimba (1984), Arjunno Vanvas Ke Pranaypravas (1984), Pradyamna-Prabhavati (1984), Shri Krishnani Aath Pataranio (1984), Shikhandi Stree Ke Puraush? (1984), Revatighela Baldevji (1984), Sahdev-Bhanumatino Pranay (1984), Kubja Ane Shri Krishna (1984), (Narma Nari) Il-Ila (1986), (Amarlok-Mrityuloknu Sahjeevan) Urvashi-Pururava (1986).

He wrote more than 450 short stories. His short story collections are Sukh Dukhna Sathi (1940), Jindagina Khel (1941), Jivo Dand (1941), Lakhcorasi (1944), Panetarna Rang (1946), Ajab Manavi (1947), Sacha Shamana (1949), Vatrakne Kanthe (1952), Orata (1954), Parevada (1956), Manna Morla (1958), Kadavo Ghuntado (1958), Tilottama (1960), Dilni Vaat (1962), Dharati Abhna Chheta (1962), Tyagi-Anuragi (1963), Dilaso (1964), Chitareli Diwalo (1965), Morlina Munga Sur (1966), Malo (1967), Vatno Katko (1969), Anwar (1970), Koi Deshi Koi Pardeshi (1971), Asmani Najar (1972), Binni (1973), Chhanako (1975), Gharnu Ghar (1979) and Narato (1981).

Jamairaj (1952) is collection of one-act plays. Dholia Sag Seesamna (1963) and Bhane Narsaiyo (1977) are his original three-act plays. Kankan (1968) and Allad Chhokari (1971) are play adaptations of his novels Fakiro and Allad Chhokari respectively. Chando Shen Shamalo? (1960), Sapanana Sathi (1967) and Kanan are Gujarati adaptations of western plays. Swapna (1978) is an adaptation of a story by Aurobindo.

He also wrote Children's literature. Vartakillol Vol. 1-2 (1972, 1973), Balkillol Vol. 1-10 (1972), Rishikulni Kathao Vol. 1-4 (1973), Devno Didhel Vol. 1-5 (1975), Mahabharat Kishorkatha (1976). Ramayan Kishorkatha (1980), Shri Krishna Kishorkatha (1980), Satyayugni Kathao Vol. 1-5 (1981) are his works for children and teens.

Alapzalap (1973) is his autobiographical work depicting his childhood and teenage years. Pannalalni Shreshth Vartao (1958), Pannalalno Vartavaibhav (1963), Vineli Navalikao (1973), Purnayognu Achaman (1978), Lokgunjan (1984) are his edited and selected works collections. His other works are Alakmalak (1986) and Sarjanni Suvarna Smaranika (1986).

Jindagi Sanjeevani Vol. 1–7 is his autobiography.

=== Translations and adaptations ===
Malela Jeev has been translated in several Indian languages such as Punjabi, Kannada and as Kalasina Jeevithalu in Telugu by Vemuri Anjaneya Sarma. The novel was translated by Rajesh I. Patel into English as The United Souls in 2011. Manvini Bhavai is translated in English by V. Y. Kantak as Endurance: A Droll Saga (1995), published by Sahitya Akademi.

His novels Malela Jeev, Manvini Bhavai and the short story Kanku were adapted into films. Malela Jeev is adapted into films and plays several times. Ulajhan directed by N. R. Acharya was the first Gujarati film adaptation of novel. Malela Jeev (1956) is a Gujarati film directed by Manhar Raskapur while Kanku (1969) was directed by Kantilal Rathod. Both films were scripted by Patel himself. Janumada Jodi, 1996 Indian Kannada film, is based on Malela Jeev. It was also adapted into a Gujarati play, directed by Nimesh Desai.

== Recognition ==
He received Ranjitram Suvarna Chandrak in 1950 and Jnanpith Award in 1985. He was the second writer from Gujarati language after Umashankar Joshi in 1967, to receive the Jnanpith Award. In 1986, he received Sahitya Gaurav Puraskar.
