= Bangarda Kural =

- Directed by: Ram Shetty
- Written by: Ram Shetty
- Produced by: Ram Shetty
- Starring: Shivadhwaj Shetty; Pakhi Hegde; Namratha Hegde
- Cinematography: Raju Kg
- Music by: V. Manohar
- Release date: 27 April 2012
- Running time: 150 minutes
- Country: India
- Language: Tulu

Bangarda Kural (transl. Golden Corn) is a 2012 Indian Tulu romantic drama film written and directed by Ram Shetty and produced under his banner of Anand Films. The film stars Shivadhwaj Shetty and Pakhi Hegde. The film is the 42nd Tulu film and features music by V. Manohar.

== Plot ==
A family of three brothers includes Shivu, who falls in love and marries Ambika, who just so happens to be the daughter of his school teacher. Shivu's sisters-in-laws hate him and their jealously increases after his marriage with Ambika, whom they dislike. Shivu's brother and sisters-in-law cook up a conspiracy against him and blame Shivu and Ambika of stealing money from one of his brothers that belongs to the wood factory.

Shivu's brother whose money was apparently stolen does not trust him. Angered, Shivu leaves to Mumbai in search of a job leaving Ambika behind. Shivu rescues a builder in Mumbai from henchman. In return for saving him, the builder appoints him as a manager for his projects. The builder's daughter falls in one-sided love with Shivu without knowing that he is married. Shivu returns home with his salary. Back home, Shivu's sister-in-laws torture Ambika (similar to Cinderella's stepsisters) and a man even attempts to rape Ambika at her areca nut plantation. A heavenly godlike force comes in disguise and rescues her.

After Shivu returns from Mumbai, he and Ambika move to a new house where they arrange a function at a temple. Heavenly interventions prevent Ambika's co-sisters' plans to bring them bad name by mixing a poison with the prasada to be served at the function.

== Cast ==
- Shivadhwaj Shetty as Shivu
- Pakhi Hegde as Ambika
- Namratha Hegde
- Machendranath Pandeshwar
- Anand Shetty
- Kishori Ballal
- Shobha Rai
- Chanchalakshi Bhat
- Suresh
- Harish
- Aravind Bolar as a shopkeeper
- Dinesh Attavar
- Vasu Shetty
- Tonse Vijay Kumar Shetty
- Pradeep Chandra
- Bhagya Rai
- Jyothi Rai
- Ashwini

== Production ==
The film was shot in Mangalore, Moodbidri, Sunkadakatte, and other places in Dakshina Kannada district.

== Release ==
The film was released in seven theatres in Udupi and Dakshina Kannada districts (outside of Mangalore) including two theatres in Mangalore.

== Reception ==
Raviprasad Kamila of The Hindu wrote that the film is a "pot boiler with a heady mix of romance, stunts, comedy, and sentiment" and concluded that Aravind Bolar "provides adequate comic relief in what is billed as a family entertainer".

== Awards ==
Tulu Cinemotsava 2015

- Best Actor (Male) - Shivadhwaj Shetty
- Best Actor (Female) - Pakhi Hegde
- Best Director - Ram Shetty
- Best Music Director - V. Manohar
- Best Cinematography - Raju K G
- Best Editor - Nasim Hakim Ansari
- Best Art Direction - Tamma Lakshman
- Best Choreography - Madan Harini
- Best Lyricist - Amrutha Someshwer
- Best Female Playback Singer - Sangeeta Balachandra
