= Baraguru Ramachandrappa =

Indian Kannada writer, thinker and filmmaker (born 1947)

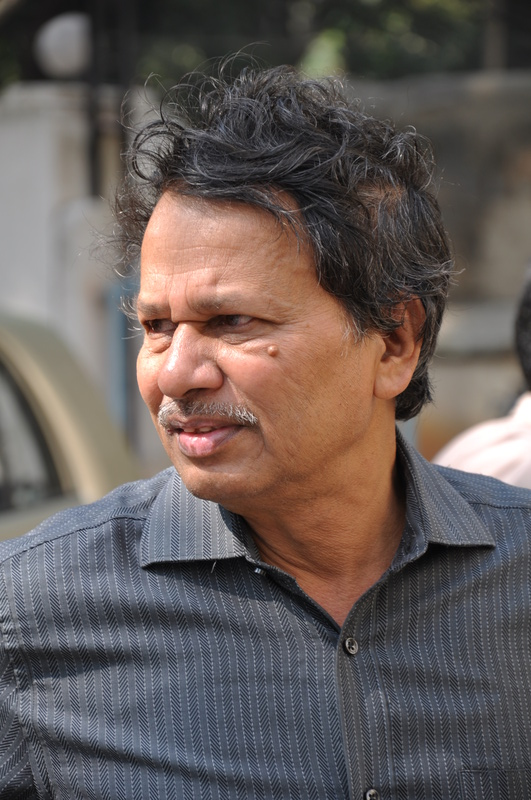
- Born: 18 October 1947 (age 79); Baragur, India
- Occupations: Professor, writer, film director
- Children: 2
- Writing career
- Notable works: Suntaragali, Ondu Urina Kathegalu, Kannadabimana, Kappu Nelada Kempukayi, Marakutika, Rajakarani, Sutra, Kantessadalli Kavya
- Movement: Bandaya movement

President of the Textbook Revision Committee, Karnataka Textbook Society
- In office May 2015 – 2021

Baraguru Ramachandrappa (born 18 October 1947) is an Indian essayist, lyricist, screenwriter, film director, socialist, writer, novelist, predominantly works in Kannada language and President of the Textbook Revision Committee, in Karnataka Text Books Society (KTBS) from May 2015. In 2008, he was given an honorary doctorate by the Kuvempu University and Rani Channamma University, Belagavi, Karnataka.

Ramachandrappa won the National Film Award for Best Lyrics in 2002 for "Baruthe Ve Nav Baruthe Ve" in the film Thaayi and was given the Pampa Award in 2011 by the Government of Karnataka for his contribution to Kannada literature. His directorial debut film, Ondu Oorina Kathe (1978), fetched him the State award for best story writer for the year 1978–79. Since then, he has been the recipient of several awards, both national and international. His novel Suntaragali won the Karnataka Sahitya Academy award.

== Biography ==
Ramachandrappa was born to Kenchamma and Rangadasappa in Baraguru village in the Tumkur district, Karnataka state. Ramachandrappa secured MA Kannada post graduation in Central college(Dr Manmohan Singh Bengaluru city University), he worked as a professor in the Kannada department of Bangalore University. He was the president of the Kannada Sahitya Academy for two years. He has made notable contributions as the Chairman of Kannada Development Authority as well as a member of various educational institutions, Doordarshan, literary and film based organizations. His contribution to Kannada literature includes novels, collection of poetry, short stories, drama, edition of other works and research and criticism for which he was awarded by the Karnataka Sahitya Academy. Class based society and its challenges is a theme that is well expressed in his creative works.

== Literary works ==
Research and criticism

- Saahithya Matthu Raajakaarana
- Samskruthi Mattu Srujanasheelathe
- Bandaaya Sahithya Meemanse
- Samskruthi - Upa samskruthi
- Vartamaana
- Rajakeeya chinthane
- Samskruthi: Shrama mattu srujanasheelathe
- Parampareyondige Pisumathu
- Kannada Sahityavemba Swatantrya Horata
- Shabdavillada Yuddha
- Cinema Ondu Janapada Kale
- Maryaadastha Manushyaraagona

Novels

- Sootra
- Ukkina Kote
- Ondu Oorina Kathe
- Benki
- Surya
- Sangappana Saahasagalu
- Seelu Nela
- Bharatha Nagari
- Gaagina Mane
- Swapna Mantapa
- Shabari

Collections of poems

- Kanasina Kannik
- Marakutika
- Nettaralli Nenda Hoovu
- Gulaama Geethe
- Maguvina Haadu
- Kaantesadalli Kavya (anthology)

Short stories

- Suntaragaali
- Kappu Nelada Kempu Kaalu
- Ondu Oorina Kathegalu (anthology)

Drama

- Kappu halage
- Kote

== Awards ==
Karnataka State Film Awards

- 1978–79: Best Story Writer – Ondu Oorina Kathe
- 1978–79: Best Dialogue Writer – Ondu Oorina Kathe
- 1983-84: Second Best Film - Benki'
- 1983–84: Best Story Writer - Benki
- 1986–87: Second Best Film - Surya
- 1988–89: Jury Special Award (Lyrics) – Kote
- 1996–97: Best Film of Social Concern - Karadipura
- 1996–97: Best Dialogue Writer - Janumada Jodi
- 1999–00: Best Story Writer - Hagalu Vesha
- 1999–00: Best Lyricist - Hagalu Vesha
- 2002–03: Second Best Film - Kshaama
- 2003–04: Second Best Film - Shanthi
- 2005–06: Best Film of Social Concern - Thayi
- 2005–06: Best Lyricist - Thayi
- 2007–08: Best Children's Film - Ekalavya
- 2008–09: Best Story Writer - Ugragami
- 2009–10: Best Film of Social Concern - Shabari
- 2011: Best Lyricist - Bhagirathi
- 2012: Best Story Writer - Angulimala
- 2014: Puttanna Kanagal Award

== Filmography ==
Ramachandrappa has been making films for more than thirty years. His debut film Ondu Oorina Kathe won him the Best Story Writer Award, Karnataka Government Film Awards in 1978. He has made several documentaries and most of his thirteen feature films have won either a Karnataka State Award or a National Film Award. His film Shanti, with only one artist entered the Guinness Book of World Records. In 2014 Karnataka State "Puttanna Kanagal Award" (Puttanna Kanagal was among the front runners in Kannada cinema's most successful film directors. In his memory and honor, this award is presented to the directors every year during the Karnataka State Awards function).

=== As director ===
Year	Film	Notes
1978	Ondu Oorina Kathe	Karnataka State Award for Best Story Writer
1983	Benki	Second Best Film / Best Story Writer
1987	Surya	Selected for Moscow international film festival Russia
1988	Kote	(film created only through songs - no dialogues)
1996	Karadipura	Selected for Leeds international film festival Britain
2000	Hagalu Vesha	Karnataka State Film Award for Best Story
2003	Kshaama	Karnataka State Film Award for Best Film
2005	Shanti	Guinness World Records in the category "Single artist film" - Third in the world Karnataka State Film Award for Best Film
2007	Janapada	
2008	Thaayi	National Film Award for Best Feature Film in Kannada, Karnataka State Film Award for Best Lyricist/Second Best Film
2008	Ekalavya	Karnataka State Film Award for Best Children's Film
2010	Ugragaami	Karnataka State Film Award for Best Story
2010	Shabari	Karnataka State Film Award for Best Social concern
2011	Bhumitayi	
2012	Bhagirathi	Karnataka State Film Award for Best Lyricist
2013	Angulimala	Karnataka State Film Award for Best Story, 3rd Annual Rafi Peer Film Festival Lahore, Pakistan and Kolkata International Film Festival
2015	Marana Dandane	Best Director - Jaipur International Film Festival
2016	Bekku	Bengaluru International Film Festival, Dhaka International Film Festival
2016	Mooka Nayaka	
2019	Bayalatada Bheemanna	
2025	Amruthamathi	
2025	Swapna Mantapa	

=== As writer ===
Year	Film	Writer	Notes
1997	Janumada Jodi	Dialogues	Also lyricist
1996	Jodi Hakki	Dialogues	
1998	Kurubana Rani	Screenplay	
