= Manvini Bhavai =

1947 Gujarati novel by Pannalal Patel

- Author: Pannalal Patel
- Original title: માનવીની ભવાઈ
- Translator: V. Y Kantak
- Language: Gujarati
- Genre: Novel
- Publisher: Sahitya Akademi (Eng. ed.)
- Publication date: 1947
- Publication place: India
- English publication date: 1995
- Media type: Print
- Dewey Decimal: 891.473
- LC Class: PK1859.P28 M3

Manvi Ni Bhavai (English: Endurance: A Droll Saga) is a 1947 Gujarati novel written by Pannalal Patel. It is set in the period of the Indian famine of 1899–1900, locally known as the Chhappaniyo Dukal (The Famine of Samvat 1956) in Gujarat. The novel centres around the love story of Kalu and Raju as well as the difficult and often tragic life of farmers during the famine. It was translated into English by V. Y Kantak in 1995. It was adapted into a Gujarati film scene in 1993.

== Background ==
Patel wrote Manvi Ni Bhavai at his small house in Mandli village, and at his maize farm in 1947, during the time of the Indian independence movement.

== Theme ==
Manvi Ni Bhavai tells the love story of Kalu, son of Vala Patel, and Raju, daughter of Gala Patel. They love each other and want to marry, but they are betrothed to other people. Patel set the love story during the time of the Indian famine of 1899-1900, and the last scene in the novel ends with the first drops of rain, which symbolizes the end of the famine.

== Reception ==
Gulabdas Broker noted in Indian Literature that, "though this book has a rural background, it is not a rural novel. Though it has love in its background, it is not a love story. It is a human document depicting the human conditions and portraying the destiny of man." The novel lead Patel to win the Jnanpith award for his "outstanding contribution towards literature" in 1985.

== Translation and adaptation ==
The novel was translated into English by V. Y Kantak, and published in 1995 by Sahitya Akademi. The Tamil translation was published in 1973 under the title Vazhkkai Oar Nadagam. It was also adapted into the Gujarati film Manvini Bhavai (1993) by Upendra Trivedi, which won the National Film Award for Best Feature Film in Gujarati. In the film, Trivedi played the role of Kalu.
