= Kommuri Venugopala Rao =

Indian novelist

- Born: 1935; Vijayawada
- Died: 30 October 2004 (aged 68–69); Vijayawada
- Occupations: Writer, Novelist, Doctor

Kommuri Venugopala Rao was an Indian novelist from Andhra Pradesh. He wrote more than 30 novels. His two novels Penkutillu and House Surgeon are well known to the Telugu readers. He was influenced by Bengali writer Sarath Chandra.

== Personal life ==
He was born in Vijayawada in the year 1935.

== Writings ==
He wrote his first novel, Penkutillu, at the age of 15 which was published in 1957. This novel is based on middle class life. House Surgeon is about a steadfast medico. Both of these books received several reprints.

== List of Novels ==
- Penkutillu
- House Surgeon
- Ee Desamlo Oka Bhagam
- Atma Jyoti
- Gorintaku
- Prema Nakshatram
