= V. Manohar =

Indian music composer, lyricist, actor

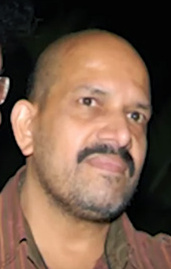
- Born: 8 February; Vitla, Bantwal, Dakshina Kannada district, Karnataka, India
- Other name: Vatla Bhat
- Occupations: Actor, lyricist, music director, film director
- Years active: 1992 - present

Vitla Manohar is an Indian music director, lyricist, film director and actor in Kannada and Tulu movies. He has scored music to several Kannada and Tulu films and written lyrics as well.

== Early life ==
Manohar is a native of Vitla village in Dakshina Kannada district of Karnataka state in India. His father is Shivanna bhat, mother Padmavathi. He started his career as a cartoonist working for some leading newspapers and magazines.

== Film career ==
Manohar has composed music for over 100 Kannada movies such as Gejje Naada, O Mallige, Indra Danush, Janumada Jodi, Tharle Nan Maga, Swasthick, Duniya, Ee Sambhaashane, Banda nan Ganda, Janumada Gelathi, and Mathadana. His song "Kolu Mande" from the movie Janumada Jodi is considered to be one of the successful Kannada songs of the 90s. The song "Kariya I Love You" from the movie Duniya is one of his hits.

His first song as a lyricist was "Hodeya Doora Oh Jothegaara" from the movie Anubhava.

== Awards ==
- 1993 - Karnataka State Film Award for Best Lyricist - "Megha O Megha" (Film: Gejje Naada)
- 1995 - Karnataka State Film Award for Best Lyricist - "O Mallige Ninnondige" (Film: Anuraaga Sangama)
- 1996 - Karnataka State Film Award for Best Music Director - Janumada Jodi
- 1997 - Karnataka State Film Award for Best Music Director - Jodi Hakki
- 2004 - Karnataka State Film Award for Best Music Director -Chigurida Kanasu
- 2007 - Filmfare Award for Best Lyricist - Kannada - "Kannallu Neenene" (Film:Pallakki)
- 2013 - Tulu Cinemotsava Award for Best Music Director - Bangarda Kural
- 2014 - Red FM Tulu Film Award for Best Lyricist - Barke
- 2015 - Tulu Cinemotsava Award for Best Music Director - Chaali Polilu

== Discography ==
Year	Film title	Notes
1992	Tharle Nan Maga	Debut film as a music director, Assistant Director
1992	Ganesha Subramanya	
1992	Police Lockup	
1992	Alli Ramachari Illi Brahmachari	
1992	Bhanda Nanna Ganda	
1992	Super Nanna Maga	
1993	Bombat Huduga	
1993	Bhavya Bharatha	
1993	Gejje Naada	
1993	Shivanna	
1993	Military Maama	
1993	Gundana Maduve	
1993	Love Training	
1994	Beda Krishna Ranginaata	
1994	Indrana Gedda Narendra	
1994	Hantaka	
1994	Looti Gang	
1994	Love 94	
1994	Prema Simhasana	
1994	Rayara Maga	
1994	Sididedda Shiva	
1995	Operation Antha	
1995	Anuraga Sangama	
1995	Hendathi Endare Heegirabeku	
1996	Janumada Jodi	
1996	Rangoli	
1996	Arishina Kumkuma	
1996	Muddina Aliya	
1996	Pattanakke Banda Putta	
1997	Bhanda Alla Bahaddur	
1997	Anna Andre Nammanna	
1997	Baduku Jatakabandi	
1997	Mavana Magalu	
1997	Nodu Baa Nammoora	
1997	Rangena Halliyage Rangada Rangegowda	
1997	Chikka	
1997	O Mallige	Debut Direction
1997	Thayavva	
1997	Akka	
1997	Ee Hrudaya Ninagagi	
1997	Jodi Hakki	
1997	Ulta Palta	
1997	Mungarina Minchu	
1997	Laali	
1997	Yuddha	
1997	Zindabad	
1998	Doni Saagali	
1998	Bhoomi Thayiya Chochchala Maga	
1998	Kurubana Rani	
1998	Maathina Malla	
1998	Mr. Putsami	
1998	Mangalyam Tantunanena	
1998	Megha Bantu Megha	
1998	Hendithghelthini	
1998	Thavarina Kanike	
1998	Jai Hind	
1998	Nammura Huduga	
1998	Veeranna	
1999	Aryabhata	
1999	Aaha Nanna Maduveyanthe	
1999	Pratibhatane	
1999	Underworld	
1999	Suryavamsha	
1999	Deveeri	
1999	Janumadatha	
1999	Swasthik	
1999	Z	1 song only
2000	Indradhanush	Also director
2000	Krishna Leele	
2000	Munnudi	
2000	Mundaithe Oora Habba	
2001	Mathadana	
2001	Chitte	
2002	Daddy No.1	
2002	Atithi	
2002	Karmugilu	
2002	Manase O Manase	
2002	Saadhu	
2002	Sri Krishna Sandhana	
2003	Chigurida Kanasu	
2003	Ardhaangi	
2003	Smile	
2003	Wrong Number	
2003	Yaardo Duddu Yallamana Jathre	
2003	Kaasu Iddone Basu	
2004	Mellusire Savigaana	
2004	Hendthi Andre Hendthi	
2004	Aaha Nanna Thangi Maduve	
2005	Moorkha	
2005	Mr. Bakra	
2006	Mata	
2006	A Aa E Ee	
2007	Duniya	
2007	Gandana Mane	
2007	Operation Ankusha	
2007	Koti Chennaya	Tulu film
2008	Chilipili Hakkigalu	
2008	Vasanthakala	
2008	Meravanige	
2008	Minchina Ota	
2008	Neenyare	Manohar's 100th movie as a Music Director
2008	Ganesha Matte Banda	
2008	Naanu Gandhi	Not score
2008	Akka Thangi	
2008	Janumada Gelathi	
2008	Nanna Olavina Banna	
2009	Nanda	
2009	Ee Sambhashane	
2009	Kallara Santhe	
2010	Lift Kodla	
2010	Naariya Seere Kadda	
2010	Shabari	
2011	Kirataka	
2011	Ujwadu	Konkani Film
2011	Noorondu Baagilu	
2011	Paagal	
2012	Bangarda Kural	Tulu film
2012	Bhagirathi	
2012	12AM Madhyarathri	
2013	Manasa	
2013	Jungle Jackie	
2014	Savaal	
2014	Typical Kailas	
2014	Angulimala	
2014	Chaali Polilu	Tulu film
2014	Murari	
2015	Oriyan Thoonda Oriyagapuji	Tulu film
2015	Geetha Bangle Store	
2015	Vamshodharaka	
2016	Akshathe	
2017	Madipu	Tulu film
2017	Pattanaje	Tulu film
2020	Campus Kranthi	
2022	Man of the Match	Lyricist
Mata	Background score only	
2024	My Hero	1 song; Background score
2026	Beauty	

== Filmography ==
- Om (1995)...Chennakeshava
- Operation Antha (1995)
- Anuraga Sangama (1995)...Seena
- Rangena Halliyage Rangada Rangegowda (1997)
- Upendra (1999)
- Kanasugara (2001)...himself
- Super Star (2002)...psychiatrist
- Gokarna (2003)
- Mata (2006)...cameo
- Snehitaru (2012)
- Anna Bond (2012)...Singapore Chandrappa
- Geetha Bangle Store (2015)
- Anjani Putra (2017)...Geetha's father
- Govinda Govinda (2021)...Ramana
