= Kurigalu Saar Kurigalu (film series) =

Kurigalu Saar Kurigalu series
- Directed by: Rajendra Singh Babu
- Written by: Rajendra Singh Babu
- Produced by: Jai Jagadish; Vijayalakshmi Singh; Dushyanth Singh
- Starring: Ramesh Aravind; S. Narayan; Mohan
- Cinematography: B. C. Gowrishankar
- Edited by: B. S. Kemparaju
- Music by: Hamsalekha
- Production company: Lakshmi Creations
- Country: India
- Language: Kannada

Kurigalu Saar Kurigalu is a series of Indian Kannada-language comedy films. The series is directed by Rajendra Singh Babu. The film's title is based on a famous poem on herd mentality written by acclaimed poet K. S. Nissar Ahmed.

== Films ==
Film	Release date	Runtime
Kurigalu Saar Kurigalu	23 March 2001	151 minutes
Kothigalu Saar Kothigalu	28 December 2001	157 minutes
Katthegalu Saar Katthegalu	28 March 2003	154 minutes
Chathrigalu Saar Chathrigalu	19 April 2013	135 minutes

=== Kurigalu Saar Kurigalu ===
Rummi, Nani and Moni are inmates who wants to remain in jail permanently. A kind hearted jailor gets them released on the basis of good behavior and wants them to lead a good life. An auto driver allowed them to house without any rent but with one condition. One of them should marry his middle aged unmarried elder sister Rukmini who is devotee of Lord Krishna. On the night Rukmini assumes Nani is tha avatar of Krishna and forced him to marriage and threatened. Trio escapes from marriage by wearing "Trimoorty" dress, while escaping enter bank unknowingly and got bags of money intended for other robbers. They saw and save the Jailor daughter from committing suicide and decide to help her. Undercover police inspector joined them to find truth about bank robbers.

=== Kothigalu Saar Kothigalu ===
Nani, Moni and Varada are middle-class employees, who wish to commit suicide but fail in it. They see an elderly business-man trying to commit suicide and talk him out of his woes. All three of them start to work for him and turn his ventures profitable. However, they become embroiled while trying to get the three daughters of the businessman married. Trying to vent out their frustrations against their wives, they flirt with the three daughters of businessman, only to end up learning the difference between marriage and flirting.

== Principal cast ==
This table lists the main characters who appear in the Saar franchise.

List indicator
- A dark grey cell indicates the character was not in the film.

Actor/Actress	Film			
Actor/Actress	Kurigalu Saar Kurigalu	Kothigalu Saar Kothigalu	Katthegalu Saar Katthegalu	Chathrigalu Saar Chathrigalu
Ramesh Aravind	Rammi	Rammi	Rammi	Rammi
S. Narayan	Nani and Nani's father	Nani	Nani	Nani
Mohan	Moni	Moni		Moni
Umashree	Rukmini	Muniyamma	Jayamma	Rajalakshmi
Komal Kumar	Ice-candy Gopala		Komi	
Urvashi		Almelu	Urmila	
Ruchita Prasad	Dr Vijayalakshmi			
Bhavana	Ramya			
Ananth Nag	Special Investigation Officer			
Doddanna	Veerappa			
Prema		Lalita		
Tara		Anu		
Meghana Naidu			Nandhini	
Sanathahi				Lakshmi

== Crew ==
Occupation	Film			
Occupation	Kurigalu Saar Kurigalu (2001)	Kothigalu Saar Kothigalu (2001)	Katthegalu Saar Katthegalu (2003)	Chathrigalu Saar Chathrigalu (2013)
Director	Rajendra Singh Babu	Rajendra Singh Babu	Rajendra Singh Babu	S. Narayan
Producer(s)	Jai Jagadish; Vijayalakshmi Singh; Dushyanth Singh	Jai Jagadish; Vijayalakshmi Singh; Dushyanth Singh	Jai Jagadish; Vijayalakshmi Singh; Dushyanth Singh	B N Pavan Karthik
Screenplay	Rajendra Singh Babu	Rajendra Singh Babu	Rajendra Singh Babu	Mohan; Ramesh Aravind; S. Narayan
Cinematography	B. C. Gowrishankar	B. C. Gowrishankar	P. K. H. Das	Jagadish Vali
Editor	B. S. Kemparaju	B. S. Kemparaju	B. S. Kemparaju	K R Lingaraj
Composer(s)	Hamsalekha	Hamsalekha	Hamsalekha	Arjun Janya

== Awards ==
Film	Award	Category	Recipient	Result	Ref
Kurigalu Saar Kurigalu	2000–01 Karnataka State Film Awards	Best Actress	Umashree	Won	
Kurigalu Saar Kurigalu	2000–01 Karnataka State Film Awards	Best Screenplay	Rajendra Singh Babu	Won	
Kothigalu Saar Kothigalu	49th Filmfare Awards South	Best Film	Jai Jagadish	Won	
Kothigalu Saar Kothigalu	49th Filmfare Awards South	Best Actor	Ramesh Aravind	Nominated	
Kothigalu Saar Kothigalu	2001–02 Karnataka State Film Awards	Best Screenplay	Rajendra Singh Babu	Won	
