= Kothigalu Saar Kothigalu =

2001 film by Rajendra Singh Babu

- VCD cover
- Directed by: Rajendra Singh Babu
- Written by: Rajendra Singh Babu
- Produced by: Jai Jagadish; Vijayalakshmi Singh; Dushyanth Singh; Srinidhi
- Starring: Ramesh Aravind; S. Narayan; Mohan; Urvashi; Prema; Tara
- Cinematography: B. C. Gowrishankar
- Edited by: B. S. Kemparaju
- Music by: Hamsalekha
- Production company: Lakshmi Creations
- Release date: 28 December 2001
- Running time: 157 mins
- Country: India
- Language: Kannada

Kothigalu Saar Kothigalu (transl. Monkeys, sir, monkeys) is a 2001 Indian Kannada comedy film directed by Rajendra Singh Babu. The film stars Ramesh Aravind, S. Narayan, Mohan, Urvashi, Prema and Tara in the lead roles. This is the second film in the Kurigalu Saar Kurigalu series directed by Babu and was released on 28 December 2001 and received generally positive reviews from the critics and turned out to be a box office hit. It completed a 100-day run in theatres. The film was remade in Telugu as Sandade Sandadi (2002), in Hindi as Shaadi No. 1 (2005) and in Bangladeshi Bengali as Tomakei Khujchi (2008).

== Plot ==
Three friends, Rammi, Nani and Moni, vexed with their wives Almelu, Lalitha and Shalini decide to commit mass suicide. But they end up saving a businessman who was also attempting suicide. These men help a factory owner in straightening out his business and earn a good salary to support their families. But they suffer from a marriage problem. Their wives do not allow them to have sex. Almelu is highly devotional and spends her days fasting. Lalitha is a busy lawyer and she is more dedicated to her work than to her family life. Shalini is a TV actress and is more interested in making love to the camera than to her husband.

At this juncture, Chandru is confronted with another problem. His foreign-born daughters are too fast for him to make them agree to an arranged marriage with the sons of his close pal. These guys give Chandru the idea that he should employ three good-looking guys and make his daughters fall in love with them. After that, the guys could ditch the girls so that they could get back to their dad to ask for forgiveness and accept his proposal. Lucky asks these three friends to play the roles of the lovers in spite of knowing that they are married. These friends attract the girls and when it's time to ditch them, they find it too discouraging as they were offered five-star luxuries by Lucky during that time. So they decide to double-cross him by marrying his daughters.

However, when their wives learn of these affairs, they confront Chandru for forcing their husbands. Chandru explains the reasoning behind his act as he wanted his daughters to lead a happy life, which they accept. The trio again tries to kill themselves, but is saved by their wives. The trio conducts the marriage of the three girls, it is hinted at the end of the movie, however, that the three friends have not completely turned over a new leaf with the entrance of the three girls whom they meet at the marriage.

== Cast ==
- Ramesh Aravind as Vardharaja "Vardha" / Rammi
- S. Narayan as Narayan "Nani"
- Mohan as Mohan "Moni"
- Urvashi as Almelu "Bondus", Rammi's wife
- Prema as Lawyer Lalitha "Lalu", Nani's wife
- Tara as Shalini "Shalu", Moni's wife
- Umashree as "Fitting" Muniyamma
- Mukhyamantri Chandru as a factory owner
- Rangayana Raghu as a police officer
- Mandya Ramesh as Kalappa, Lalu's coworker
- Vainidhi Jagadish as Vainidhi

== Soundtrack ==
Kothigalu Saar Kothigalu
- Soundtrack cover

Soundtrack album by Hamsalekha
- Released: 2001
- Genre: Feature film soundtrack
- Label: Akash Audio

Hamsalekha composed the music for the film and soundtrack

Track #	Song	Singer(s)	Lyrics
1	"Kothigalu Saar"	Hemanth Kumar	Hamsalekha
2	"Maduveya Nantharaa"	Chetan Sosca	Hamsalekha
3	"Baare Rajakumari"	Hemanth Kumar, Badri Prasad, Shankar Shanbag, Lata Hamsalekha, Sangeetha, Nagachandrika	Hamsalekha
4	"Hai Hai Teenage"	Anuradha Sriram, Divya, Nanditha	Hamsalekha
5	"Oye Oye Namde Zamana"	Chetan Sosca, Manjula Gururaj	Hamsalekha
6	"Bondana Dummina"	B. Jayashree, Malgudi Subha, Radhika	Hamsalekha
7	"Jeena Yahan"	Ramesh Chandra	Hamsalekha
8	"Naanu Yaava"	Ramesh Chandra	Hamsalekha

== Reception ==
A critic from Chitraloka wrote that "It is a two and half an hour laugh riot from frame one in KSK2". Sify wrote "Forget the title Kothigalu Sar Kothigalu which means ‘Monkeys Sir Monkeys’, the film has plenty of good humour and clean dialogues which makes it a great entertainer".

== Awards and nominations ==
Year	Category	Winner	Result	Ref.
2001	Filmfare Award for Best Film – Kannada	Jai Jagadish (producer)	Won	
2001	Filmfare Award for Best Actor – Kannada	Ramesh Aravind	Nominated	
2001-02	Karnataka State Film Award for Best Screenplay	S. V. Rajendra Singh Babu, Ramani	Won	
