= Kurigalu Saar Kurigalu =

2001 Kannada comedy film directed by Rajendra Singh Babu

- VCD Cover
- Directed by: Rajendra Singh Babu
- Written by: Rajendra Singh Babu
- Produced by: Jai Jagadish; Vijayalakshmi Singh; Dushyanth Singh
- Starring: Ramesh Aravind; S. Narayan; Mohan; Ananth Nag; Bhavana; Umashree
- Cinematography: B. C. Gowrishankar
- Edited by: B. S. Kemparaju
- Music by: Hamsalekha
- Production company: Lakshmi Creations
- Release date: 23 March 2001
- Running time: 151 minutes
- Country: India
- Language: Kannada

Kurigalu Saar Kurigalu (transl. Sheep Sir Sheep) is a 2001 Indian Kannada-language comedy film directed and written by Rajendra Singh Babu. The film stars Ramesh Aravind, S. Narayan, Mohan, Bhavana, Ruchita Prasad, and Ananth Nag, Rani in lead roles. This is the first film in the namesake series directed by Babu and was released on 23 March 2001 and received generally positive reviews from the critics and turned out to be box-office hit.

The film won the Karnataka State Film Award for Third Best Film and also Karnataka State Film Award for Best Supporting Actress to Umashree for the year 2001. The film's title is based on a famous poem on herd mentality written by acclaimed poet K. S. Nissar Ahmed.

== Plot ==
Rummi, Nani and Moni are three inmates who want to remain in jail permanently as they do not want to witness the outside world. A kind-hearted inspector gets them released as he finds goodness in them and wants them to lead a good life. All three get a home thanks to an auto driver with a condition that one of them marries his middle-aged elder sister who is unmarried. Umashree falls in love with Nani assuming him to be Lord Krishna. However he escapes from the forced marriage. All three end up falling in love with other girls. Due to a mix up, they receive a bag of money intended for other robbers. The three witness Srinivasa Murthy's daughter and her lover kill themselves and after saving them, they learn that Srinivasa Murthy is ill and she is forced by her uncle to marry his immature son to take over her property. In the end, the trio, with the help of their lovers (two of them being undercover police), and an inspector teach them a lesson, have them arrested and they marry their partners.

== Cast ==
- Ramesh Aravind as Ramesh alias Rammi
- S. Narayan as Narayana alias Nani and Nani's father
- Mohan as Mohan alias Moni
- Ananth Nag as Special Investigation Officer
- Bhavana as Ramya
- Ruchita Prasad as Dr Vijayalakshmi
- Bhavyasree Rai
- NGEF Ramamurthy as lawyer
- Umashree as Rukmini
- Srinivasa Murthy as Jail Warden Neelakanthappa
- Doddanna as Veerappa
- Komal Kumar as Ice Candy Gopala
- Vinayak Joshi as Bhavana's brother
- Rani as Malayali Kutty
- Harish Raj as Rajesh
- Sundar Raj as Sundar, Rukmini's brother
- Mandeep Roy as Tailor Seethapathi
- Honnavalli Krishna as Sampangi
- Bank Suresh
- Danny
- Ravi Varma
- Joe Simon
- Mari Mutthu
- Hulivana Gangadharayya
- Shankar Bhat
- Tharakesh Patel

== Production ==
The film was launched at Ramanashri California Resort, near Yelahanka in the outskirts of Bangalore and the film's first shot was also shot there on the same day. Ramani who earlier worked in Telugu films and dialogue writer Nanjunda assisted in penning the screenplay.

== Soundtrack ==
Kurigalu Saar Kurigalu

Soundtrack album by Hamsalekha
- Released: 2001
- Genre: Feature film soundtrack
- Label: Anand Audio

Track #	Song	Singer(s)	Lyrics
1	"Ayyo Hogi Saar"	Mano, Hemanth Kumar, Badri Prasad	Hamsalekha
2	"Chori Chakori"	Hemanth Kumar	Hamsalekha
3	"Sondi Sondi"	Hemanth Kumar, Rajesh Krishnan, Badri Prasad	Hamsalekha
4	"Nidire Baradire"	Mano, Hemanth Kumar, Badri Prasad	Hamsalekha
5	"Kutti Kutti"	Ramesh Chandra, Chitra Sivaraman	Hamsalekha

== Reception ==
A critic from Chitraloka wrote that "A heavily loaded nonstop silly comedy surrounding the three wayward youths is quite interesting film. Forget the logic and watch this". Indiainfo wrote "The movie basically suffers from a weak storyline; the story seems to be beyond even the director's control. The first half is funny but in the second half, the story loses shape".
