= B. B. Ashok Kumar =

Indian police officer (1977 - 2012)

Karnataka Police Service, Government of Karnataka
- In office 1977 – 31 July 2012

Personal details
- Born: Biddanda Bopanna Ashok Sillaimarathupatti, Theni
- Occupation: Civil servant

B. B. Ashok Kumar (also known as Tiger Ashok Kumar) is a retired Assistant Commissioner of Police, credited with arresting several notorious criminals and being involved in numerous police encounters while trying to capture hardened criminals.

== Early life ==
Born in Parane village, Virajpet, in the Kodagu district of Karnataka, he is the son of a coffee estate manager from Koppa-Chikkamagalur.

== Police service ==
Kumar joined the Karnataka State Police Service in 1977 and is credited with 18 encounters. He was part of the Special Task Force of the Karnataka Police, which was tasked with capturing forest brigand Veerappan. During this time, Ashok is reported to have killed 13 of Veerappan's accomplices.He and his team also gained attention for the Kammanahalli encounter, where notorious history-sheeter Station Shekar was killed. Kumar retired from service on 31 July 2012 and continues to face constant threats to his life from the criminal underworld.

== Honours and awards ==
He won the President of India's Gold Medal three times and the Chief Minister of Karnataka's gold medal once. Ashok was given the nickname 'Tiger' by the Home Minister in 1984.

Year	Name of Award or Honour
1986	President of India Gallantry Gold Medal
1998	President of India Meritorious Service Gold Medal
2006	President of India Distinguished Service Gold Medal
1992	Chief Minister of Karnataka Gold Medal
2011	Karnataka Govt Kempegowda Award

== In films and literature ==
There are five Kannada movies made on his experience and adventures to date.

- Amaanusha (1989), with Ananth Nag acting as Kumar
- Circle Inspector (1995), with Devaraj acting as Kumar
- Deadly Soma (2005), with Devaraj as Kumar
- Deadly-2 (2010), with Devaraj as Kumar
- Mynaa (2013) with Sharath Kumar acting as Kumar

Kumar has authored three books,

- Huliya Nenapugalu – ISBN 8128025856
- Bullet Savari – ISBN 9788128025860
- Police Whistle – ISBN 9789390490677
