= Kalavu =

Kalavu (lit. 'Steal') may refer to:

- Kalavu (2013 film), an Indian Kannada-language film by Ravi M.
- Kalavu (2019 film), an Indian Tamil-language crime thriller film
