= Aadyathe Kanmani =

- Directed by: Rajasenan
- Written by: Rafi Mecartin; Rajasenan
- Produced by: Sarada
- Starring: Jayaram; Sudharani; Biju Menon; Chippy; K. P. A. C. Lalitha; Janardhanan; Jagathy Sreekumar; Maniyanpilla Raju
- Cinematography: Venu
- Edited by: G. Murali
- Music by: S. P. Venkatesh
- Release date: 7 July 1995
- Running time: 165 minutes
- Country: India
- Language: Malayalam

Aadyathe Kanmani (𝘍𝘪𝘳𝘴𝘵𝘣𝘰𝘳𝘯 𝘋𝘢𝘳𝘭𝘪𝘯𝘨) is a 1995 Indian Malayalam-language family drama film directed by Rajasenan.

== Plot ==
Balachandran Unnithan is a singer who falls in love with Ambika, a singer from his own troupe and they both get married. Balachandran's family longs for a male child to inherit the family's wealth, but his elder brothers have only female children. When Ambika becomes pregnant, Balachandran realizes that his wife is carrying a daughter, and not a son.

Later, he meets his old classmate and best friend, Padmarajan, whose wife Hema is also pregnant, bearing a male child. However, their babies are swapped by mistake by Balu's mother soon after the delivery. Both Padmarajan and Balu must keep this as a secret to see their children. When Balu's relatives discover this, the babies get kidnapped by the antagonists.

== Cast ==
- Jayaram as Balachandran Unnithan (Balu)
- Sudha Rani as Ambika Balachandran
- Biju Menon as Padmarajan (Pappan)
- Chippy as Hema
- K. P. A. C. Lalitha as Malavika (Balachandran's mother)
- Janardhanan as Unnithan (Balachandran's father)
- Jagathy Sreekumar as Sreedharan Unnithan (Balachandran's eldest brother)
- Maniyanpilla Raju as Dineshan Unnithan (Balachandran's older brother)
- Kanakalatha as Kousalya (Sreedharan's wife)
- Priyanka Anoop as Usha (Dineshan's wife)
- V. K. Sreeraman as Divakaran (Usha's father)
- Indrans as Narayanankutty
- Sathaar as Nambiathiri
- Babu Namboothiri as Raghavan Nair (Ambika's father)
- K.T.S. Padannayil as Malavika's father and Balachandran's grandfather
- Prem Kumar as Urumees
- Reshmi Soman as Ambika's sister
- Kottayam Santha as Koushalya's mother
- Sindhu Jacob as Hema's servant

== Soundtrack ==
The soundtrack of Aadyathe Kanmani was composed by S. P. Venkitesh, with lyrics penned by S. Ramesan Nair and I. S. Kundoor. The film features a mix of original compositions and resung versions of classic Malayalam songs.

Two songs originally composed by M. S. Baburaj were reused in the film—"Aadyathe Kanmani", from Bhagyajathakam (1962), and "Akale Akale", from Midumidukki (1968). These songs, with lyrics by P. Bhaskaran and Sreekumaran Thampi, were reinterpreted with new vocal renditions while retaining their classic essence.

Song	Composer	Lyricist	Singers	Raga
Aadyathe Kanmani (Resung from Bhagyajathakam)	M. S. Baburaj	P. Bhaskaran	Rajasenan, Sindhu	—
Akale Akale (Resung from Midumidukki)	M. S. Baburaj	Sreekumaran Thampi	K. J. Yesudas, S. Janaki	Charukesi
Ammaanathambazhanga	S. P. Venkitesh	S. Ramesan Nair	P. Jayachandran, Biju Narayanan	—
Madhuvidhuraavukale	S. P. Venkitesh	S. Ramesan Nair	K. J. Yesudas, K. S. Chithra	Madhuvanthi
Manassil	S. P. Venkitesh	I. S. Kundoor	Biju Narayanan, K. S. Chithra	Mohanam

== Remakes ==
Year	Film	Language	Cast	Director	Ref
1996	Enakkoru Magan Pirappan	Tamil	Ramki, Khushbu, Vadivukkarasi	Keyaar	
1997	Nayanamma	Telugu	Suresh, Sivaranjani, Sharada	Siva Nageswara Rao	
1997	Muddina Kanmani	Kannada	Shivarajkumar, Maathu, Umashree	Ravi Kotarkar	
2000	Beti No. 1	Hindi	Govinda, Rambha, Aruna Irani	T. Rama Rao	

== Box office ==
The film was commercial success.
