= Ravi Srivatsa =

Indian director and writer

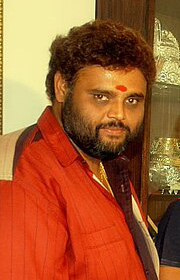
- Other name: Ravi Srivastava
- Occupations: Director, writer
- Years active: 1995—present

Ravi Srivatsa is an Indian director and writer who works in Kannada-language films. He is known for directing Deadly Soma (2005).

== Career ==
Ravi Srivatsa worked as a dialogue writer and associate director in many films during the second half of the 1990s. He made his directorial debut with Ee Rajeev Gandhi Alla, which was produced in 2002 and had a delayed release in 2007. His next film was Deadly Soma (2005) starring Aditya, which was based on the underworld don of the same name who was shot dead in Bangalore in the 1990s. The film made pre-release headlines due to its censor troubles and was a box office success. His next film Ganda Hendathi (2006), the remake of Murder (2004) released to mixed reviews and was labeled 'the most provocative Kannada film' by one reviewer. He made several gangster-themed films: Madesha (2008) and Deadly-2 (2010), the latter of which is a sequel to Deadly Soma (2005). His next film Dashamukha (2012) was inspired by 12 Angry Men (1957), Ek Ruka Hua Faisla (1986) and the Kannada play Aa Mukhagalu. His latest film Tiger Galli (2017) is based on a real incident that happened in Chennai. Srivatsa cast Sathish Ninasam in the lead after he was impressed with his role in Madesha (2008). He worked on a sequel to Deadly-2 titled Deadly-3 in 2021, which is yet to be released.

== Filmography ==
Year	Film	Notes
2005	Deadly Soma	
2006	Ganda Hendathi	
2007	Ee Rajeev Gandhi Alla	
2008	Madesha	
2010	Deadly-2	
2012	Dashamukha	
2017	Tiger Galli	
2026	Gangs Of UK	

As writer

- Putmalli (1995) (also actor)
- Lady Police (1995)
- Hello Daddy (1996)
- Karnataka Suputra (1996)
- Zindabad (1997)
- Lady Commissioner (1997)
- Jackie Chan (1997)
- Dhairya (1997)
- Central Jail (1997)
- Agni IPS (1997)
- Simhada Guri (1998)
- Amar Akbar Anthony (1998)
- Under World (1999)
- The Killer (1999)
- Mr. X (1999)
- Garuda (1999)
- Yajamana (2000)
- Naxalite (2000)
- Durgada Huli (2000)
- Mysore Huli (2001)
- Mafia (2001)
- Law and Order (2002)
- Kiccha (2003) (also actor)
- Sahukara (2004)
- Sye (2005)
- Election (2013)
- Maanikya (2014)
- Shivajinagara (2014)
- Vishnu Priya (2025)

As actor

- Aaha (1999)
- Partha (2003) (uncredited)
