= Balondu Bhavageethe =

- Directed by: Geethapriya
- Written by: K. S. Sathyanarayana; Geethapriya (dialogues)
- Screenplay by: Geethapriya
- Story by: Narayana Rao (Based on Novel)
- Produced by: Geetha Srinath; M. S. Karanth
- Starring: Srinath; Anant Nag; Saritha; C. R. Simha
- Cinematography: B. N. Haridas
- Edited by: Suresh Urs
- Music by: Hamsalekha
- Production company: Vijayeshwari
- Distributed by: Vijayeshwari
- Release date: 7 July 1988
- Running time: 121 minutes
- Country: India
- Language: Kannada

Balondu Bhavageethe is a 1988 Indian Kannada-language film, directed by Geethapriya and produced by Geetha Srinath and M. S. Karanth. The film stars Srinath, Anant Nag, Saritha and C. R. Simha. The film has musical score by Hamsalekha.

== Cast ==
- Srinath
- Anant Nag in Special Appearance
- Saritha
- C. R. Simha
- Ramesh Bhat
- Shivaram
- Shimoga Venkatesh
- M. S. Karanth
- Umashree
- Padma Kumuta
- Anitharani
- Baby Rekha
- Baby Sangeetha

== Soundtrack ==
The music was composed by Hamsaleka.

No.	Song	Singers	Lyrics	Length (m:ss)
1	"Yauvvana Ondu"	S. P. Balasubrahmanyam	R. N. Jayagopal	04:17
2	"Beeso Gaali"	Malaysia Vasudevan, Vani Jairam	Chi. Udaya Shankar	05:06
3	"Bala Sangeetha"	Malaysia Vasudevan	Chi. Udaya Shankar	03:23
4	"Ide Roopa"	Malaysia Vasudevan	Chi. Udaya Shankar	04:39
