= K. Y. Narayanaswamy =

Indian poet, scholar, critic, and playwright (born 1965)

K Y Narayanaswamy
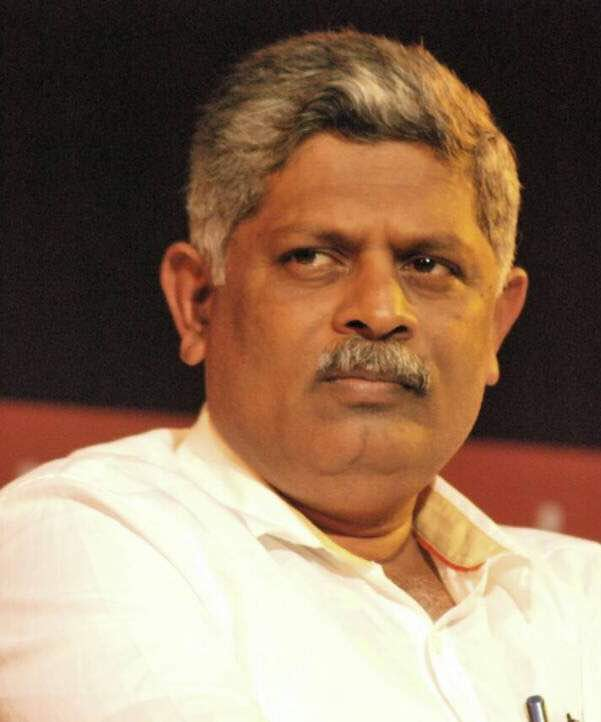
- Born: 5 June 1965 (age 61); Kuppur village near Masthi, Malur taluk, Kolar district, Karnataka, India
- Other name: KYN
- Education: Bangalore University
- Occupations: Kannada language professor, Playwright, Poet, Vice-Chancellor (In-charge)
- Writing career
- Notable awards: Karnataka Sahitya Academy Award

Kuppur Yalappa Narayanaswamy, also known as KYN, is a popular Kannada poet, scholar, critic, and playwright. He is currently a Kannada professor and Vice-Chancellor (in-charge) in the Maharani Cluster University, Bangalore. He is the author of many popular Kannada plays including Kalavu, Anabhigna Shakuntala, Chakraratna, Huliseere, and Vinura Vema. He has also translated Kuvempu's Shudra Tapaswi into Telugu. He is credited with adapting Kuvempu's magnum opus Malegalalli madumagalu into a 9-hour play. He has also written the screenplay for the films Kalavu and Suryakaanti.

He won the Karnataka Sahitya Akademi Award for his play Pampabharatha, which is considered a milestone in modern Kannada theatre. He is considered to be an influential writer and thinker. His plays are representative of Kannada theatre's search for new frontiers in experimental theatre.

== Biography ==
KYN was born in Kuppur village near Masthi in Malur Taluk, Kolar district, Karnataka. He was born to Yalappa and Muniyamma. He finished his schooling in Masthi and moved to Bangalore to obtain his BA, MA and M.Phil. degrees in Kannada. His PhD, titled Neeradeevige, is considered a milestone in the societal understanding of cultural associations with water. He currently lives in Bangalore with his wife and two children.

== Writing career ==
KYN first came into prominence with his play Pampabharatha, whose essence is based on Adikavi Pampa's epic poem Vikramarjunavijaya, which is also known as Pampabharatha. While Pampa's epic relates the Mahabharatha from the perspective of Arjuna, KYN's play is based on Karna's viewpoint of events in Mahabharatha. However, the play is also a deconstruction of Pampa's version and the Mahabharatha itself, and it moves the narration to contemporary times and also focuses on issues of contemporary relevance. The play, staged by the theatre group Samudaya, has seen a hundred shows.

Since Pampabharatha, his other plays such as Kalavu, Anabhigna Shakuntala, and Male Mantrika have been widely appreciated by Kannada audiences. He is currently working on a new play tentatively titled Mallige.

In 2010, KYN adapted Kuvempu's Malegalalli Madumagalu (The Bride in the Mountains) into a 9-hour play that was directed by noted theatre director and NSD alumnus C. Basavalingaiah. The play was staged about 15 times each in Bangalore and Mysore, and showcased to nearly 60,000 audience members.

KYN also co-authored the script for the light and sound show Manushya Jathi Tanonde Valam with Kotaganahalli Ramaiah and Lakshmipathy Kolar. This show, also directed by Basavalingaiah, with music composed by famed music director Hamsalekha, was staged in 28 districts in Karnataka.

KYN has also written screenplays for the films Kalavu (a cinematic adaptation of his play) and Suryakaanti. He is currently working on screenplays with renowned Kannada film directors TS Nagabharana and Nagathihalli Chandrashekar.

He has curated a music album titled Kolar Desi Gold, with music scored by Hamsalekha. The album is a compilation of Telugu folk songs that have also been translated into Kannada. He has written the lyrics for the music album Kailamp (KYN love songs), with music being composed by his student Arvinda SD and the songs sung by an ensemble of popular singers in styles ranging from classical and folk to jazz.

As a Kannada professor, KYN has authored the Kannada text Sahitya Samvada -1 for Bangalore University.

== Plays ==
- Pampabharatha
- Kalavu
- Male Mantrika (an adaptation of the play The Rainmaker by Richard Nash)
- Anabhigna Shakuntala
- Chakrarathna
- Malegalalli Madumagalu (based on the book by Kuvempu)
- Vinura Vema
- Shudra Tapaswi (translation of Kuvempu's play into Telugu)
- Kaivara Nareyana
- Maya beete
- Neevu kaaNiRe
- Mathe Mukyamantri
- Higaadare Hege
- Mallige
- Varna Pallata

== Films ==
- Adikavi Pampa (Documentary, Scriptwriter)
- Suryakaanti (Story and Screenplay)
- Kalavu (Story & Screenplay)
- Last bus (lyrics)
- Bhgavathi Kaadu (lyrics)

== Music ==
- Kolar Desi Gold (curated)
- Kailamp (KYN love songs)

== Books ==
- Aduva Giliyonda Kalisamma, Poetry, Published by Christ College, Bengaluru-2000.
- Neera Deevige, Research Thesis, Published by Lohiya Prakashana, Ballary- Revised Edition Published by Pragathi Graphics, Bengaluru-2007.
- Thalaparige, Co-editor, Published by Dr.B.R.Ambedkar Development Corporation, Govt. of Karnataka, Bengaluru-2006.
- Bharamma Bhagirathi mathu ithara lekanagalu, Street Plays, Published by Sirivara Prakashana, Bengaluru-2006.
- Bahubali, a children's play, 2nd Edition Published by Rangayana, Mysore- 2006.
- Nenava Pari, a collection of criticism articles, Published by Pragathi Graphics, Bengaluru-2010. ISBN 81-908185-9-7
- Kaivara Nareyana Published by Sirivara Prakashana, Bengaluru-2008 ISBN 978-81-910906-1-1
- Male Mantrika A play Published by Aviratha Prakashana, Bengaluru-20013
- Vimrsha Barahagalu A Collection of Articles Published By Srusti Publications no121 13 main M C layout Vijayanagar Bangalore ISBN 978-93-81244-23-4
- Anbhijan Shakuntala A play published by KO Prakashana29/8 2nd floor,1st Cross Indiranagar Rajaji nagar Bangalore 10
- KYN MOORU Natakagalu A Drama Collection Published by Avirata trust 73 2main 3stage Vinayaka layout Bangalore-40 ISBN 978-93-5267-920-1
- KYN Rang Geethegalu Drama songs Collection Published by Avirata trust 73 2main 3stage Vinayaka layout Bangalore-40 ISBN 978-93-5267-615-6
- MaaruVesha Story play And screen play BySapna Book House ( P)Ltd 11,3 main Gandhinagar Benglaore ISBN 978-93-86631-65-7
- Malegalalli Madhumagalu A play Adaption Published by Kannada culture Department GOK Bangalore ISBN 978-93-5267-396-4
- Nyastane NelaBaalane Published by Kannada Pustaka pradikara, Kannada Bhavana JC Road Bangalore-2 ISBN 978-93-5289-267-9
- Bhashe kiridu A collection of Articles Published by Kannada sangha St.joseph Commerce College Briged road Bengaluru-44 ISBN 978-81-939983-1-1
- Vinura Vema A Drama on Yogi Vemana Published by CVG India Gandhi Bhavana Kumara park East Bangalore-1
- Huli Sire A Collection of Poems Published by Abhinava 17/18-2,1main Marenahalli Vijayanagar, Bangalore-40

== Awards ==
- Karnataka Sahitya Akademi Award for Pampabharatha(2005)
- Karnataka Sahitya Akademi Award for `Nenevapari' (Published Year 2010)
- Karnataka Sahitya Akademi Award for Anabhigna Shakuntala(2013)
- Karnataka International Music Award 2013 and 2014 (for Anabhigna Shakuntala and Male Mantrika)
- State Award 2014 for best screenplay for Kalavu cinema By Govt of Karnataka (Kalavu)
- Karnataka Nataka Akademi Award for the Year 2018
- Kavyananda Prashasthi For Kyn Mooru Natagalu by Dr Siddaiah Puranik trust Bangalore 2019
- Kuvempu Sirigannada Prashasthi By Kannada sahithya Parishathu Bangalore

== Other activities ==
KYN is a founding member of the Besagarahalli Ramannna Trust, which provides scholarships and financial aid to needy students. The Trust also organizes annual rural summer camps.

Together with other lecturers of Government Science College, KYN started a midday meal scheme for students.

KYN has initiated a program titled Kuvempu Odu (Read Kuvempu) along with K V Narayana. The program identifies various colleges across Karnataka and introduces students to Kuvempu's writings and philosophy.

== See also ==
- Kannada
- Kannada literature
- Kannada poetry
