= Naam Iruvar (1985 film) =

- Theatrical release poster
- Directed by: R. Krishnamoorthy
- Produced by: A. V. M. Kumaran
- Starring: Sivaji Ganesan; Prabhu; Urvashi; Charle
- Cinematography: T S Vinayagam
- Music by: Gangai Amaran
- Production company: AVM Productions
- Release date: 8 March 1985
- Country: India
- Language: Tamil

Naam Iruvar (transl. We Two) is a 1985 Indian Tamil-language film, directed by R. Krishnamoorthy and produced by AVM Productions. The film stars Sivaji Ganesan, Prabhu, Urvashi and Charle. It is a remake of the Kannada film Ramapurada Ravana, and was Ganesan's 250th film as an actor.

== Plot ==
Veerayya (Sivaji Ganesan) is a retired alcoholic soldier that's living in his hometown with his niece, Radha (Urvashi). Raja (Prabhu) arrives in town as the new teacher and is offered a place to stay at the home of the trustee of the school, Sivagami (Srividya). Veerayya and Sivagami were in love once but couldn't get married. Her father, Somasundaram (V. S. Raghavan) was the town leader and opposed the match due to Veerayya's illiteracy and lack of wealth. Sivagami was set to marry a man that her father chose but he died on the wedding day and she remains unmarried. Veerayya left town due to his heartbreak and joined the army. He now spends his days drinking and fighting against the injustices meted out by Periyadurai (V. K. Ramasamy) to the townspeople. Periyadurai smuggles drugs, prints counterfeit cash and has murdered townspeople in his bid to become rich and powerful. He's assisted in his misdeeds by his younger brother Chelladurai (Sivachandran), mistress Mayilu (Kovai Sarala) and right-hand man Papo (Vennira Aadai Moorthy). Veerayya turns over a new leaf and gives up drinking after Raja's interference. Raja also begins to teach Veerayya. Radha and Raja also fall in love. Periyadurai plans to steal the money the townspeople collect to make improvements to the school. His plan is discovered by the Panchayat Board executive officer, Ramalingam (V. Gopalakrishnan) who is also Sivagami's brother. Periyadurai's group kills Ramalingam and sets it up to look like he was the thief. This sets Sivagami, Veerayya and Raja against Peryiradurai as the trio work together to uncover the depths of his misdeeds and bring him to justice.

== Cast ==
- Sivaji Ganesan as Veerayya
- Prabhu as DSP Shankar / Raja
- Urvashi as Radha
- Srividya as Sivagami
- V. K. Ramasamy as Periyadurai
- Charle as Samipillai
- Sivachandran as Chelladurai
- Kovai Sarala as Mayilu
- Vennira Aadai Moorthy as Papo
- V. Gopalakrishnan as Ramalingam
- Loose Mohan as Govindan
- Anuradha as Govindan's wife
- V. S. Raghavan as Somasundaram (Special Appearance)
- Jayamalini as a dancer in the Potten Ginger
- Suresh Chakravarthi

== Production ==
The film's title was named after 1947 film of same name also produced by AVM Productions.

== Soundtrack ==
Soundtrack was composed by Gangai Amaran, with lyrics by Vaali.

Track listing
No.	Title	Singer(s)	Length
1.	"Thiruvizha"	P. Jayachandran, B. S. Sasirekha
2.	"Onnudhan"	S. P. Balasubrahmanyam, S. P. Sailaja
3.	"Potten Ginger"	Malaysia Vasudevan, S. Janaki
