= Love (2004 film) =

- Directed by: Rajendra Singh Babu
- Written by: Rajendra Singh Babu
- Produced by: Rajendra Singh Babu
- Starring: Mohanlal; Aditya; Rakshita
- Cinematography: Ajayan Vincent
- Edited by: S. Manohar
- Music by: Anu Malik
- Production company: S. V. R. Movies Pvt Ltd.
- Release date: 9 July 2004
- Running time: 165 minutes
- Country: India
- Language: Kannada

Love is a 2004 Indian Kannada-language romance film written, directed and produced by Rajendra Singh Babu. The film stars Mohanlal, Aditya, making his debut, and Rakshita in lead roles, while Amrish Puri and Kota Srinivasa Rao feature in supporting roles. This was also Mohanlal's debut in Kannada, and features him in a guest role. The film features soundtrack composed by Bollywood composer Anu Malik, marking his debut in Kannada cinema. The film was dubbed and released in Telugu as Prema Nagar and in Malayalam as Aey Taxi.

== Plot ==
The story is about the romantic relationship between Vicky and Ganga that begins from Kashi and then travels to Dubai. Tragedy starts with Jai Jagadish and ends with Saligrama Oberoi. Ganga, who mistakes Vikram to be a womaniser, understands his character when he saves her from a fire accident. They become lovers, but things change when a mysterious woman enters their lives.

== Cast ==
- Mohanlal as Mohan Nair (cameo appearance)
- Aditya as Vikram "Vicky"
- Rakshita as Ganga
- Amrish Puri as Saligrama Oberoi
- Kota Srinivasa Rao as Nachiyappa
- Jai Jagadish as Jai
- Venu Madhav as Venu
- Dharmavarapu Subramanyam as Kotta Nembu
- Vinaya Prasad as Sumathi
- Brahmavar as Shiva
- Komal Kumar as Antony
- Suman Setty as Manish
- Pavitra Lokesh as Sridevi
- Vishwajeet Pradhan as Vishwa

== Production ==
Mohanlal made his Kannada cinema debut in a cameo appearance through this film, as a taxi driver. The film was shot in locations such as Allahabad and Varanasi, a month long shoot was conducted in Dubai from November 2003. Mohanlal joined the film in November in Dubai. The film was written, directed and produced by Rajendra Singh Babu. His son Aditya made his acting debut with the film in the leading role. The film was launched at 25 February 2003 at Windsor Manor.

== Soundtrack ==
Love

Soundtrack album by Anu Malik
- Released: 20 May 2004
- Genre: Feature film soundtrack
- Label: Anand Audio

The music of the film was composed by veteran Bollywood music composer Anu Malik, making his debut in Kannada cinema. The makers also used A. R. Rahman's Airtel jingle for a few songs in the album.

Love
No.	Title	Lyrics	Music	Singer(s)	Length
1.	"Twinkle Twinkle"	K. Kalyan	A. R. Rahman	Rajesh Krishnan, Lakshmi	1:19
2.	"Elu Bannada"	K. Kalyan	Anu Malik	KK, Sunidhi Chauhan	5:01
3.	"L.O.V.E. ge Jaari Bidde"	K. Kalyan	Anu Malik	Sonu Nigam, Shreya Ghoshal	6:16
4.	"Jil Jil"	K. Kalyan	A. R. Rahman	Lakshmi	1:06
5.	"Maargayare"	Kaviraj	Anu Malik	KK, Kalpana, Nalini, Joly Mukherji	5:18
6.	"Jil Jil"	K. Kalyan	A. R. Rahman	Rajesh Krishnan, Lakshmi	1:49
7.	"L.O.V.E. ge Jaari Bidde"	K. Kalyan	Anu Malik	Sonu Nigam	1:16
8.	"Hey Jambada Koli"	Hamsalekha		Shaan	4:40
9.	"Jil Jil"	K. Kalyan	A. R. Rahman	Rajesh Krishnan	1:06
10.	"Are Jamu Jamu"	K. Kalyan	Anu Malik	Sonu Nigam	5:44
11.	"Airtel Tune"	A. R. Rahman	A. R. Rahman	A. R. Rahman	0:57

Telugu dubbed version is titled Prema Nagar.

Prema Nagar (Telugu version)
No.	Title	Lyrics	Singer(s)	Length
1.	"Yedu Rangula Prema"	Veturi	KK, Sadhana Sargam
2.	"Jhamu Jhamu"	Viswa	Sonu Nigam, Chorus
3.	"Brahma Manadesi"	Chandrabose	Shaan, Mehboob
4.	"L.O.V.E ke"	Veturi	Sonu Nigam, Sadhana Sargam
5.	"Maargayare"	Vishwa	KK, Jolly Mukkerjee, Kalpana
6.	"Airtel Jingle"	A. R. Rahman	A. R. Rahman

The Malayalam dubbed version was titled Aey Taxi.

Aey Taxi (Malayalam version)
No.	Title	Lyrics	Singer(s)	Length
1.	"Margayare"	Mankombu	Jolly Mukherjee, M. G. Sreekumar, Ranjini Jose	5:18
2.	"Elu Varnam"	Mankombu	M. G. Sreekumar, Jyotsana	4:49
3.	"Ambadi Kemi"	Mankombu	M. G. Sreekumar	4:55
4.	"Twinkle Twinkle"	Mankombu	M. G. Sreekumar, Swapna	1:20
5.	"Jolly Jolly"	Mankombu	M. G. Sreekumar	5:44
6.	"Yuvagaledhel"	Mankombu	M. G. Sreekumar	1:06
7.	"L. O. V. E"	Mankombu	M. G. Sreekumar, RimiTomy	8:03
8.	"Manasu Manasu"	Mankombu	M. G. Sreekumar, Swapna	1:49
9.	"Airtel Jingle"	A. R. Rahman	A. R. Rahman	1:06

== Release and reception ==
Love was released on 9 July 2004. The film was dubbed and released in Telugu as Prema Nagar and in Malayalam as Hey Taxi.

The reviewer for Deccan Herald called the film "a disappointing fare" and criticized its plot. Of the acting performances, they wrote, "Actingwise, Adithya has put in good efforts. There is nothing much to say about Rakshitha's performance as she has done similar roles earlier. Arun Sagar in the role of Amrish Puri's son is wasted." The reviewer concluded writing, "Camerawork gets noticed particularly in Banaras and Dubai desert scenes. Anu Malik's musical score has nothing new. The only songs by A R Rahman's were good." Sify wrote "This is a big budget film shot in the picturesque locales of Varanasi, Dubai and other exotic locations on a lavish scale. The songs, cinematography and actions are well conceived but the director has not given any importance to the story which is predictable and banal".
