= C. R. Simha =

Indian actor, director, dramatist and playwright (1942 - 2014)

- Born: Channapatna Ramaswamy Simha; 16 June 1942; Channapatna, Kingdom of Mysore, British India
- Died: 28 February 2014 (aged 71); Bengaluru, Karnataka, India
- Occupations: Actor, director
- Spouse: Sharada Simha
- Relatives: Srinath (brother)

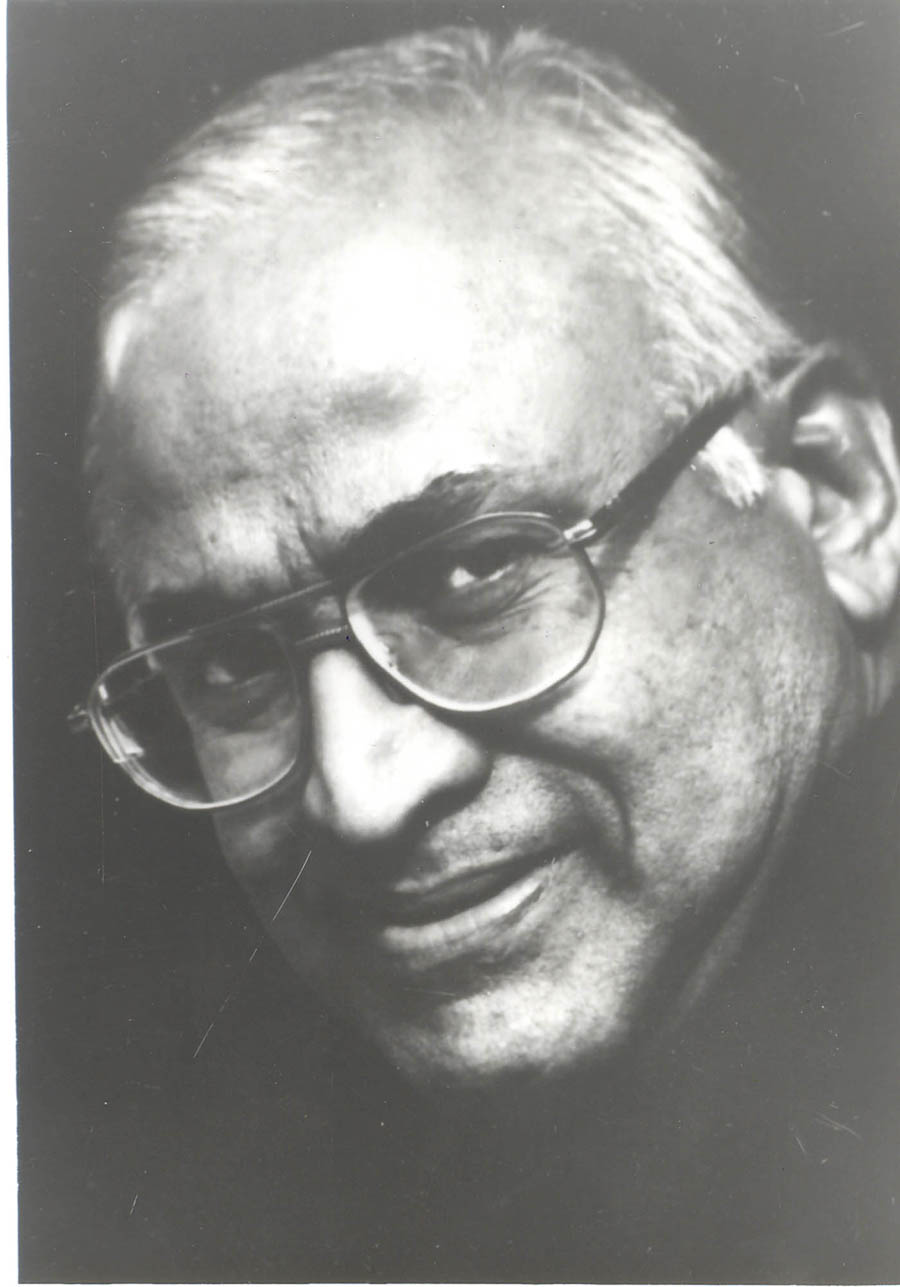
Portrait of Simha, 2004

Channapatna Ramaswamy Simha (16 June 1942 – 28 February 2014), better known as C. R. Simha, was an Indian actor, director, dramatist and playwright. He was best known for his work in Kannada films and for his work in stage shows. Starting his career in Prabhat Kalavidaru, a theatre group based in Bengaluru he acted in numerous Kannada plays which reached the cult status. He started his own theatre group called "Nataranga" in 1972 and directed many successful plays such as Kākana Kote, Thughlaq and Sankranthi.

Simha also directed and acted in the Kannada adaptation of Shakespeare's Midsummer Night's Dream and Othello. These plays found a widespread presentation across many states in India. Following this, he directed and acted in many English plays written by eminent personalities such as Moliere, Bernard Shaw, Edward Albee and Neil Simon among others. Apart from theatre, Simha acted in more than 150 feature films in Kannada which include both artistic and commercially viable projects. He also directed about five feature films with the most prominent being his own film adaptation of Kakana Kote.

Simha received many awards in both the cinema and theatre fields. In 2003, he was awarded with the prestigious Sangeet Natak Akademi Award by the Government of India recognising his contribution to theatre acting and direction.

== Early life ==
Simha was born in Karnataka on 16 June 1942 into a Hoysala Karnataka Brahmin family. His younger brother Srinath is a film actor who acted in several mainstream Kannada cinema as both the leading actor and supporting actor.

Simha appeared on stage at the age of twelve. He wrote a book at the age of thirteen titled "Family Doctor" and got a publisher for a remuneration of ₹15. He was a student of National College at Basavanagudi, Bangalore. In 1959, he joined the National College Histrionics Club, an institution nurtured by Dr. H. Narasimhaiah. Simha then acted in many Kannada plays like "Bahaddur Ganda" and "Manavemba Markata".

== Career ==
=== Theatre ===
Simha, along with his friends, started a theatre group called "Nataranga" in 1972. He acted in and directed many successful plays like Kakana Kote and Tughlaq.

Simha also acted in and directed straight translations of Shakespeare's plays such as Midsummer Night's Dream and Othello, which besides Karnataka, were also performed in Delhi, Bombay (Mumbai), Madras (Chennai) & Calcutta (Kolkata). In 1960, Simha became a member of "Bangalore Little Theatre" (BLT) and since then directed some of the reputed English plays which included his portrayal of Cyrano de Bergerac which was hailed as a memorable performance. His other notable works for BLT were Utpal Dutt's Suryashikar and Girish Karnad's Thuglaq.

In 1983, Simha started another theatre group called "Vedhike" in which his one-man show Typical Kailasam became a success. It was the first amateur Kannada play to be performed abroad (in the United States of America, Canada and England). Some of the other notable plays which made news through "Vedhike" are Meese Bandoru, Bhairavi, Karna, Rasa Rishi Kuvempu, Macbeth, Maduve Maduve, Haavu Yeni and 8/15. Among these, Rasa Rishi Kuvempu, based on the life and literature of Kuvempu, was made into a film, directed by Simha's son Rithwik Simha, in which Simha plays the role of Kuvempu.

=== Films ===
Besides making his strong presence in theatre, Simha was also a popular mainstream character actor in numerous Kannada films. He acted in close to 150 feature films. His portrayal of roles varied from critically acclaimed award-winning films like Samskara, Bara, Chithegu Chinthe and Anuroopa and also in commercially acclaimed films such as Indina Ramayana, Nee Bareda Kadambari, Parameshi Prema Prasanga, Rayaru Bandaru Mavana Manege and Nee Thanda Kanike. Simha played negative roles, against Anant Nag in Ramapurada Ravana (1984) and with Dr. Rajkumar in Parashuram (1990). Simha's villainous role in Parashuram was said to be very menacing.

Besides acting, Simha has directed five films including Kakana Kote (1977), Shikaari, Simhasana, Ashwamedha (1990) and Angayalli Apsare (1993).

=== Television ===
Simha made his strong presence in television too and acted in several tele-serials in Kannada, Hindi and English languages. This includes the serial Malgudi Days. Another serial was Goruru in America based on the travelogue written by the humorist Gorur Ramaswamy Iyengar. Simha played the part of Gorur and the serial was shot extensively in America including New York, Washington D.C., Niagara Falls, Disneyland and Universal Studios – Hollywood.

=== Publications ===
Simha wrote and published five plays in Kannada. He was a popular columnist, he wrote a column called "Nimma Simha" every Friday for six years in the popular daily newspaper Vijaya Karnataka and three volumes of this are published in the Book forum.

== Filmography ==
=== Actor ===
- Samskara (1970)
- Sankalpa (1973)
- Kanneshwara Rama (1977)
- Anuroopa (1977)
- Chithegu Chinthe (1978) - Gajasimha
- Bhoomige Banda Bhagavanta (1981)
- Praya Praya Praya (1982)
- Ajith (1982)
- Bara (1983)
- Simhasana (1983)
- Sukha Samsarakke 12 Suthragalu (1984)
- Ramapurada Ravana (1984)
- Madhuve Madhu Tamashe Nodu (1984)
- Indina Ramayana (1984)
- Thayi Kanasu (1985)...Javaraiah
- Parameshi Prema Prasanga (1985)
- Brahma Gantu (1985)
- Savira Sullu (1985)
- Nee Bareda Kadambari (1985)
- Jeevana Chakra (1985)
- Beegara Pandya (1986)
- Maduve Madu Tamashe Nodu (1986)
- Nenapina Doni (1986)
- Bete (1986)
- Na Ninna Preetisuve (1986)...Jagadish
- Digvijaya (1987)...Dasayya
- Bedi (1987)
- Shiva Mecchida Kannappa (1988)
- New Delhi (1988)
- Balondu Bhavageethe (1988)
- Kadina Benki (1988)
- Ranaranga (1988)
- Avane Nanna Ganda (1989)
- Amanusha (1989)
- Avathara Purusha (1989)
- Sharavegada Saradara (1989)
- Sankranthi (1989)
- Parashuram (1989)
- Hosa Kavya (1989)...M.L.A. Ramachandrappa aka Thippayya
- Krishna Nee Kunidaga (1989)
- Nammoora Hammera (1990)
- Khiladi Thata (1990)
- Poli Kitty (1990)
- Nakkala Rajakumari (1991)
- Navathare (1991)
- S. P. Bhargavi (1991)
- Ksheera Sagara (1992)
- Belliyapppa Bangarappa (1992)
- Jhenkara (1992)
- Bahaddur Hennu (1993)
- Rayaru Bandaru Mavana Manege (1993) - Ramachandra Rayaru; the father of Suma
- Apoorva Jodi (1993)
- Chamatkara (1994)
- Keralida Sarpa (1994)
- Kona Eedaithe (1995)
- Thumbida Mane (1995)
- Himapatha (1995)
- Emergency (1995)
- Shiva Sainya (1996)...Rajashekhar
- Choo Baana (1997)
- Jenina Hole (1997)
- America America (1997)
- Jackie Chan (1997)
- Muddina Kanmani (1997)
- Kandalli Gundu (1997)
- Laali (1997)
- Mommaga (1997)
- Jagadeeshwari (1998)
- Kurubana Rani (1998)
- Suvvi Suvvalali (1998)
- Gadibidi Krishna (1998)
- Kubera (1999)
- Rambhe Nee Vayyarada Gombe (1999)
- Tuvvi Tuvvi Tuvvi (1999)
- Aaha (1999)
- Nannaseya Hoove (1999)
- Balarama (2002)
- Devara Makkalu (2003)
- Om Ganesh (2004)
- Pathi Pathni Avalu (2004)
- Gandugali Kumara Rama (2005)
- Lancha Samrajya (2007)
- Maathaad Maathaadu Mallige (2007)
- Hani Hani (2008)
- Aathmeeya (2008)
- Chikkamagaloora Chikkamallige (2009)
- Swatantra Palya (2009)
- Savaari (2009)
- Rasarushi Kuvempu (2010)
- Prithvi (2010) - Home Minister of Karnataka
- Gaana Bajaana (2010)
- Aidondla Aidu (2011)
- Gandhi Smiles (2012)
- Krantiveera Sangolli Rayanna (2012)
- Veera (2013)

=== Director ===
- Shikari (1981)
- Ashwamedha (1992)
- Angaili Apsare (1993)

== Death ==
In February 2014, Simha was admitted to Sevakshetra Hospital, Bangalore having been suffering from prostate cancer from over a year. He died on 28 February 2014. On 1 March, his body was kept at the Samsa Bayalu Rangamandira for people to pay homage and his favourite songs were sung by theatre artists. He was cremated at the Banashankari crematorium in Bangalore the same day. Simha's last public appearance was at the press meet of the film Rasarishi Kuvempu in which he played the lead role.
