= Munduvareda Adhyaya =

Indian Kannada drama film by Balu Chandrashekar

- Directed by: Balu Chandrashekar
- Written by: Balu Chandrashekar
- Produced by: Kanaja Enterprises
- Starring: Aditya; Mukyamantri Chandru; Jai Jagadeesh; Ajay Raj; Ashika Somashekar
- Cinematography: Dilip Chakravarthy
- Edited by: Srikanth
- Music by: Johnu-Nitin
- Release date: 19 March 2021
- Running time: 120 minutes
- Country: India
- Language: Kannada

Munduvareda Adhyaya is a 2021 Indian Kannada action film written and directed by debutant Balu Chandrashekar. The film is produced by Kanaja Enterprises. Deadly Aditya plays the lead role of cop and is supported by ensemble star cast Jai Jagadish, Mukhyamantri Chandru, Ashika Somashekar and others. Johny-Nithin composed the music, background score by Anoop Seelin and cinematography is handled by Dilip Chakravarthy.

== Plot ==
Seasoned cop Bala investigates the murder of a prominent person as Contractor Vishwas Narayan. Initially case has no clues and all fingers are pointed towards a certain MLA Shanth Shankar. Bala plunges into the case and finally identities the murderer but then realises that it more complicated, eventually will the super cop nab the real criminal?

== Cast ==
- Deadly Aditya as ACP Bala
- Mukhyamantri Chandru as Home Minister
- Jai Jagadish as Commissioner
- Bhaskar Shetty as Contractor Vishwas Narayan
- Ajay Raj as Actor Chinthan
- Vinay Krishnaswamy as MLA Shantha Shankar
- Ashika Somashekar as Journalist Sakshi
- Chandana Gowda as Doctor Acchari
- Sandeep Kumar as Karna
- Shobhan as Robert

== Soundtrack ==
Munduvareda Adhyaya

Soundtrack album by Johny-Nitin
- Genre: Feature film soundtrack
- Label: Anand Audio

The film's soundtracks are composed by Johny-Nitin and background score by Anoop Seelin. The music rights were acquired by Anand Audio.

Tracklist
No.	Title	Lyrics	Singer(s)	Length
1.	"Jagada Niyama Bareda Shivane"	Balu Chandrashekhar	Hemanth	3:48
2.	"Nee Maaya Sanchari"	Jayanth Kaikini	Raghu Dixit	3:50
3.	"Naa Baredaithu"	Jayanth Kaikini	Sanjith Hegde, Sangeetha Ravindranath	3:11
4.	"Ninagende"	Balu Chandrashekhar	Sangeetha Ravindranath	3:40
