= Chithegu Chinthe =

Indian Kannada-language Political satire film

- Directed by: M. S. Sathyu
- Screenplay by: Javed Siddiqui
- Dialogues by: S. Ramaswamy
- Story by: Javed Siddiqui
- Produced by: G. N. Lakshmipathy
- Starring: C. R. Simha; Manjula; Paula Lindsay; Ramprakash
- Cinematography: Ashok Gunjal
- Edited by: Chakraborthy
- Music by: B G Ramanath; Prabhakar Bhadri
- Background score by: G. K. Venkatesh; L. Vaidyanathan
- Production company: Savan Movies
- Release date: 23 August 1978
- Running time: 120 minutes
- Country: India
- Language: Kannada

Chithegu Chinthe (transl. The Restless Corpse) is a 1978 Indian Kannada-language Political satire film directed by M. S. Sathyu and written by Javed Siddiqui. It stars C. R. Simha and Manjula in the lead roles along with Paula Lindsay, Ramprakash, Shivaram and Mac Mohan in key supporting roles. The songs were composed by B. G. Ramanath and Prabhakar Bhadri while the background score was by G. K. Venkatesh and L. Vaidyanathan. The cinematography and editing were handled by Ashok Gunjal and Chakraborthi.

The satirical film is a comedy set in a fictional country called Gajadweepa, where a superstar becomes a politician, and it uses mainstream film tropes to deliver a keen allegorical critique of power. Upon release, the film was critically acclaimed and went on to win the Special Jury Award at the Karnataka State Film Awards.

== Plot summary ==
A popular film star navigates a new life as a politician while avoiding the traps of crooked politicians and criminals on a mythical island called Gajadweepa.

== Cast ==
- C. R. Simha as Gajasimha
- Manjula as Malini
- Paula Lindsay
- Ramprakash as Avinasha
- Shivaram as film director
- Uma Shivakumar as Thayavva, film producer
- Mac Mohan as Shantharam
- Anantharam Macheri
- Padmashree Gajasimha's secretary
- Hamju Imam as Sambashiva
- Narayana Rao Phule
- Kunigal Ramanath
- Sundar Krishna Urs in a guest appearance
- Dheerendra Gopal in a guest appearance
- Shantharam in a guest appearance
- B. S. Achar in a guest appearance
- Meena Kuttappa in a guest appearance

== Soundtrack ==
Chithegu Chinthe

Soundtrack album by B. G. Ramanath & Prabhakar Bhadri
- Released: 1978
- Genre: Feature film soundtrack
- Label: Saregama

The music was composed by B. G. Ramanath and Prabhakar Bhadri with lyrics for the soundtrack by S. Ramaswamy.

Track list
No.	Title	Lyrics	Singer(s)	Length
1.	"Naavella Kurudaru"	S. Ramaswamy	D. Prabhakar Rao
2.	"Sharanu Sharanavva"	S. Ramaswamy	S. P. Balasubrahmanyam, B. K. Sumitra
3.	"Kadala Seemeyinda"	S. Ramaswamy	K. J. Yesudas
4.	"Jeeva Arasida"	S. Ramaswamy	S. Janaki

== Awards ==
- 1978–79 Karnataka State Film Awards
  - Special Jury Award – M. S. Sathyu
