= Ramapurada Ravana =

- Directed by: Rajachandra
- Produced by: C. Jayaram; G. Radhakrishna
- Starring: Anant Nag; Aarathi; Geetha; Thoogudeepa Srinivas
- Cinematography: B. C. Gowrishankar
- Edited by: Manohar
- Music by: Rajan–Nagendra
- Production company: Durgaparameshwari Productions
- Release date: 1 September 1984
- Country: India
- Language: Kannada

Ramapurada Ravana is a 1984 Indian Kannada-language film, directed by Rajachandra and produced by C. Jayaram and G. Radhakrishna. The film stars Anant Nag, Aarathi, Geetha and Thoogudeepa Srinivas. The film has musical score by Rajan–Nagendra. The film was remade in Tamil as Naam Iruvar.

== Plot ==
Rudra (Thoogudeepa Srinivas) is an alcoholic living in his hometown with his niece Parvati (Geetha) and orphan Thimma (M. S. Umesh). Ramachandra (Anant Nag) arrives in town as the new school teacher. He is offered a place to stay at the home of the school's trustee Shanti (Aarathi).

Shanti's father Basavaraj (K. S. Ashwath) was the town leader. Rudra and Shanti were in love but Rudra had refused to marry her because he was illiterate. Shanti had married the man chosen by her father but he had died on their wedding night.

Rudra now spends his days fighting against the injustices meted out by Marthanda Prabhu (C. R. Simha) to the townspeople. Marthanda smuggles drugs, prints counterfeit cash and has murdered townspeople in his bid to become rich and powerful. He is assisted in his misdeeds by his nephew Pashupathi (Maanu), mistress Mayuri and right-hand man Kempa (Dinesh).

With Ramachandra's intervention Rudra turns over a new leaf and gives up drinking. Ramachandra also begins to teach Rudra and makes him literate. Parvati and Ramachandra fall in love. Meanwhile, Marthanda plans to steal public money collected for making improvements to the school. His plan is discovered by the Panchayat Board executive officer, Gopal Rao (Loknath). Marthanda's henchmen kill Gopal and set it up to look like he was the thief. Shanti, Ramachandra and Rudra must work together to bring him to justice.

== Cast ==
- Anant Nag as DCP Sushil Kumar / Ramachandra Shastry
- Aarathi as Shanti
- Geetha as Parvathi
- Thoogudeepa Srinivas as Rudra
- C. R. Simha as Marathanda Prabhu
- Dinesh as Thirupathi
- Maanu as Pashupathi
- M. S. Umesh as Thimma
- Lokanath as Gopal Rao
- Keerthiraj
- Negro Johnny
- K. S. Ashwath as Basavarajaiah (Special Appearance)

== Soundtrack ==
The music was composed by Rajan–Nagendra.

No.	Song	Singers	Lyrics	Length (m:ss)
1	"A Aa E Ee Sariyagi"	S. Janaki, S. P. Balasubrahmanyam	Chi. Udaya Shankar	04:33
2	"Kanda Naguthiroo"	S. P. Balasubrahmanyam	Chi. Udaya Shankar	04:21
3	"Gata Gatane Ninna"	S. P. Balasubrahmanyam	Chi. Udaya Shankar	04:11
