= Mohini 9886788888 =

- VCD cover
- Directed by: Rajendra Singh Babu
- Written by: M. S. Ramesh (Dialogues)
- Screenplay by: S. V. Rajendra Singh Babu
- Story by: S. V. Rajendra Singh Babu; Ramana
- Produced by: Rajendra Singh Babu; A. Mohan
- Starring: Aditya; Sadha; Suhasini; Anu Prabhakar
- Cinematography: R. Giri
- Edited by: Lakshman Reddy
- Music by: Hamsalekha
- Production company: Sri Lakshmi Venkateshwara Arts Pvt Ltd.
- Distributed by: Mahatma Pictures
- Release date: 11 August 2006
- Running time: 158 minutes
- Country: India
- Language: Kannada

Mohini 9886788888 is a 2006 Indian Kannada-language horror film directed, co-produced and written by Rajendra Singh Babu. The film stars Aditya and Sadha, with Suhasini, Anu Prabhakar and Adi Lokesh in other prominent roles. It features original score and soundtrack from Hamsalekha. The film, upon release, was a box office success.

== Plot ==
Varun, a CID officer, and his wife Varsha, a press reporter, investigate the gruesome murder of Mohini.

== Cast ==
- Aditya as Varun
- Sadha as Varsha
- Suhasini as Mohini's mother
- Anu Prabhakar as Sumanna
- Rajesh Nataranga as Rajesh
- Adi Lokesh as John
- Komal Kumar as Investigating officer
- Bullet Prakash as Investigating officer's assistant
- Hamsa Nandini as Mohini
- Nassar as Goolappa
- Riyaz Khan as Vicky
- K. S. L. Swamy as Varun and Sumanna's father
- Mohan Juneja as Mohan A.
- B. M. Giriraj as Varsha's coworker
- Sriraksha Shivakumar
- Baby Anughna as Deepthi
- Ramesh Pandit as Inspector Anjanappa
- R. G. Vijayasarathy as Varsha's senior reporter (uncredited)

== Production ==
The film was launched on 27 October 2005 at Dr. Ambedkar Bhavan, Bangalore.

== Soundtrack ==
The music was composed and lyrics written by Hamsalekha.

Track listing
| No. | Title | Singer(s) | Length |
|---|---|---|---|
| 1. | "Ranga Ranga" | Kavita Krishnamurthy, Udit Narayan | 05:52 |
| 2. | "Preethiyalli Naanu" | Kunal Ganjawala, Anuradha Bhat | 05:31 |
| 3. | "Jwalamukhiya Haage" | Shankar Mahadevan, Rathnamala Prakash | 05:06 |
| 4. | "Belagavi Hudugi" | Malathi, Hemanth Kumar | 05:28 |
| 5. | "Just Say Hi" | P. Ravi Shankar, Nanditha | 04:35 |
| 6. | "Mohini Mohini" | Harish Raghavendra, Chaitra H. G. | 05:29 |
| 7. | "Mohini Mohini" | Anuradha Sriram | 05:29 |
| Total length: | | | 37:30 |

== Reception ==
R. G. Vijayasarathy of Rediff.com wrote that "If you like horror movies, you will certainly like Mohini ". A critic from Sify said the film was devoid of logic or sense. A critic from Chitraloka wrote "National acclaimed director S.V.Rajendra Singh as usual has the good material, gripping style but the tautness is missing. The length and inconsequential scenes is the main bottleneck of this film. However the film is worth a dekko (transl. watch) for Singh Babu's very honest attempt. The film is good in music and camera work too. The graphics remind us of the yesteryear films".
