= Chathrigalu Saar Chathrigalu =

2013 Indian Kannada-language comedy film directed by S. Narayan

- Official poster
- Directed by: S. Narayan
- Screenplay by: Ramesh Aravind; S. Narayan; Mohan
- Produced by: Pawan Karthik
- Starring: Ramesh Aravind; S. Narayan; Mohan; Umashree; Sanathahi
- Cinematography: Jagadish Vali
- Edited by: K. R. Lingaraj
- Music by: Arjun Janya
- Production company: Padma Sundari Creations
- Release date: 20 April 2013
- Running time: 135 minutes
- Country: India
- Language: Kannada

Chathrigalu Saar Chathrigalu (transl. Umbrellas, sir, umbrellas) is a 2013 Indian Kannada-language comedy film directed by S. Narayan. The final instalment in the Kurigalu Saar Kurigalu series, the film stars Ramesh Aravind, S. Narayan, Mohan, Umashree and Sanathahi.

== Cast ==
- Ramesh Aravind as Ramesh aka Rammi
- S. Narayan as Narayan aka Nani
- Mohan as Mohan Sundar aka Moni
- Umashree as Rajahmundry Rajalakshmi, Moni's Aunt
- Sanathani as Lakshmi, Nani's Love Interest
- Sushma Raj as Anjali, Rammi's Love Interest
- Pavitra Gowda
- Manasi as Kavya, Bhagavan's Daughter
- Shivaram as Bhagavan, Rajalakshmi's Husband and Moni's Uncle
- Rangayana Raghu as Police Inspector and Bhagvan's Brother
- Mukhyamantri Chandru as Nani's Uncle
- Sadhu Kokila as Apparao, Rajalakshmi's Brother
- Bullet Prakash as Bullet Bassu
- Sundar Raj as Neelakanta, Lakshmi's Father and Rajalakshmi's Brother

== Production ==
The film reached the dubbing stage in February 2013.

== Music ==
Chathrigalu Saar Chathrigalu

Soundtrack album by Arjun Janya
- Released: 2013
- Recorded: 2013
- Genre: Feature film soundtrack
- Length: 21:07
- Language: Kannada

Track listing
No.	Title	Singer(s)	Length
1.	"Chathrigalu Saar Chathrigalu"	Ravi Basrur, Sachin	2:37
2.	" Dovve Dovve"	Anuradha Bhat, Ravi Basrur	3:40
3.	"Yaramma Yaramma"	Chandan Shetty, Priya Yadav, Sumithra	3:47
4.	"Udaisu Udaisu"	Ravi Basrur	3:21
5.	"Mithay Mithay"	Vijay Prakash, Prashanth Basrur	4:01
6.	"Dovve Dovve (version 2)"	Ravi Basrur, Priya Yadav	3:39
Total length:			21:07

== Release and reception ==
Because Umashree was contesting at the Terdal Assembly constituency, the film was not released in that area.

A critic from The Times of India gave the film a rating of three out of five stars and opined that "A well-scripted comedy film. Don’t look for a serious story. Just watch and enjoy the comedy". B. S. Srivani of Deccan Herald gave the film the same rating and wrote that "“Chatrigalu...” still works, mainly because underneath all the sex-laced dialogues, there are still some gems to be found. It’s a laughing matter, after all".
