= Mooru Janma =

- Directed by: H. R. Bhargava
- Written by: T. K. Rama Rao
- Screenplay by: H. R. Bhargava; B. L. Venu
- Produced by: S. N. Parthanath Brothers
- Starring: Ambareesh; Ambika; Anuradha; Lokesh
- Cinematography: D. V. Rajaram
- Edited by: Yadav Victor
- Music by: Rajan–Nagendra
- Production company: Sridhara Krupa Productions
- Release date: 22 August 1984
- Country: India
- Language: Kannada

Mooru Janma ( transl. Three generations) is a 1984 Indian Kannada-language film, directed by H. R. Bhargava and produced by S. N. Parthanath Brothers. The film stars Ambareesh, Ambika, Anuradha and Lokesh. The film has musical score by Rajan–Nagendra. The movie is based on the novel of same name, by T. K. Rama Rao.

== Cast ==
- Ambareesh
- Ambika (Voice dubbed by B. Jayashree)
- Anuradha
- Lokesh
- Sudarshan
- Jai Jagadish
- Dinesh
- Sudheer
- Rajaram
- Vijayakashi
- Mysore Lokesh
- Phani Ramachandra
- Thimmayya
- Master Manjunath
- Thoogudeepa Srinivas
- Chethan Ramarao
- Shashikala
- Shanthamma

== Soundtrack ==
The music was composed by Rajan–Nagendra.

No.	Song	Singers	Lyrics	Length (m:ss)
1	"Ninagagi Haaduthihe"	S. Janaki	Chi. Udaya Shankar	
2	"Nannavane Chennigane"	S. Janaki, S. P. Sailaja	Dodda Range Gowda	
3	"Nyayakke Neleyilla"	S. P. Balasubrahmanyam	Shyamasundara Kulkarni	
4	"Nee Bandare"	S. Janaki, S. P. Balasubrahmanyam	R. N. Jayagopal	
