= Deadly Soma =

- DVD cover
- Directed by: Ravi Srivatsa
- Written by: Ravi Srivatsa
- Based on: Life of Deadly Soma
- Produced by: M Manjunath Gowda; Shobha Rajanna
- Starring: Aditya; Rakshita
- Narrated by: Ravi Belagere
- Cinematography: Mathew Rajan
- Edited by: Lakshman Reddy
- Music by: Sadhu Kokila
- Production company: K K Films
- Release date: 26 August 2005
- Running time: 146 minutes
- Country: India
- Language: Kannada

Deadly Soma is a 2005 Indian Kannada-language biographical crime film written and directed by Ravi Srivatsa. The film is based on the real life incidents of an infamous underworld don, Deadly Soma. The film stars Aditya in the title role and Rakshita. Tara, Devaraj and Avinash play other pivotal roles.

The film featured an original score and soundtrack composed by Sadhu Kokila. The film, upon release, received a positive response from both critics and audience and was subsequently remade in Telugu as Nandeeswarudu (2012). It was also released in Hindi as Ek Aur Aathank.

A sequel film Deadly-2 was made by the director and lead actor and released in 2010 which could not match the success level to this film.

== Plot ==
This film is based on the real-life story of a young man from a well-civilized family who takes the criminal route due to unavoidable circumstances.

== Cast ==
- Aditya as Somashekhar "Deadly Soma"
- Rakshita as Jyothi
- Avinash as Chinnaswamy
- Tara as Parvathi
- Devaraj as B. B. Ashok Kumar
- Bullet Prakash as Chandrashekhar "Chandu"
- Shobhraj as Babaraj
- Kote Prabhakar as Vasantha
- Harish Rai as Kumara "Bidda"
- Vijaykumar
- Girija Lokesh as Chandu's mother
- Kishore as "Bete" Naga
- Duniya Vijay as Narayana, Babaraj's henchman
- Lakshman as Chinnaswamy's business partner
- Bharath Bhagavathar as Soma's brother
- R. G. Vijayasarathy as Home Minister Marappa
- Prithviraj as Commissioner of Police
- Mandeep Roy as Counterfeit HMT watches manufacturer

== Soundtrack ==
The music was composed by Sadhu Kokila.

Track listing
No.	Title	Lyrics	Singer(s)	Length
1.	"Usire Usire"	K. Kalyan	Karthik, Bombay Jayashri
2.	"Dooravadeyallo"	K. Kalyan	C. Ashwath, Nagachandrika
3.	"O Kshatriya"	V. Nagendra Prasad	Hemanth
4.	"Chindi Bidda"	Manjunath	Anoop, Chaitra H. G.
5.	"Hey Hasivendarenu"	V. Nagendra Prasad	P. Unnikrishnan, Kavita Krishnamurthy
6.	"Om Gananaatha"	Collection	Chetan Sosca

== Reception ==
A critic from Deccan Herald wrote that "The director tells the story through a tight screenplay and a realistic narrative technique". A critic from Sify wrote that "On the whole a gory, violent and obnoxious film".

== Sequel ==
The film has a sequel Deadly-2 (2010).
