= Madana (film) =

- VCD cover
- Directed by: Jai Jagadish
- Screenplay by: Jai Jagadish
- Story by: Silambarasan
- Based on: Manmadhan (Tamil)
- Produced by: Vijayalakshmi Singh
- Starring: Aditya; Samiksha; Charmila; Shobaraj; Ramesh Bhat; Bullet Prakash
- Cinematography: R. Giri
- Edited by: B. S. Kemparaj
- Music by: Yuvan Shankar Raja
- Production company: Sri Lakshmi Entertainers
- Release date: 1 December 2006
- Country: India
- Language: Kannada

Madana is a 2006 Indian Kannada-language romantic crime thriller film directed by actor Jai Jagadish, making his directorial debut. A remake of the 2004 Tamil film Manmadhan, it stars Aditya in the title role with Samiksha, Charmila, Shobaraj, Ramesh Bhat and Bullet Prakash playing supporting roles. The film was released on 3 November 2006 to mostly negative reviews and failed at the box office.

== Plot ==
Madhankumar aka Madhan (Auditya) is a graphics designer by profession. He also learns music as part-time in a college. Urvashi (Sameksha) also learns music from the same college. Urvashi gets scared seeing Madhan because once she had a dream of getting raped by Madhan. Later on she realizes Madhan's kind nature and the two become good friends.

But Madhan also has another side where he finds and kills morally incorrect girls in the city. He takes the dead bodies of those girls to drainage and burns them to ashes and stores it in a bottle with the name of the girl pasted over the bottle. Media attention turn towards the case of missing girls and Assistant Commissioner Kachingatti (Shobaraj) is in charge of finding the person behind the mystery.

One day, Urvashi finds Madhan riding a bike with a girl at the pillion. On the next day, Urvashi gets shocked to see the news that the girl whom she spotted with Madhan the previous day goes missing. Urvashi thinks that Madhan is behind all the crime and informs police about Madhan and his whereabouts. Madhan gets arrested.

During investigation, Madhan reveals that it is his younger brother Mohan Raj (also Auditya) who is responsible for the all problems. The story moves to a flashback where Mohan Raj, an innocent guy comes from a village to join engineering. He falls in love with his classmate Vaishnavi (Charmila). Vaishnavi also reciprocates her love for Mohan Raj seeing his good nature. But Mohan Raj's friends inform him that Vaishnavi has an affair with her relative Seenu who also studies in the same class. When Mohan Raj asks about this to Vaishnavi, she gets angry thinking that Mohan Raj does not trust her.

Mohan Raj realizes his mistake and goes to Vaishnavi's house to apologize but gets shocked to see her on bed with Seenu. He also hears Vaishnavi's conversation with Seenu that she pretends to love Mohan Raj but would like to marry him, so that she can take advantage of his innocence and sincere love which will help her lead a life the way she wants and Mohan Raj will be like a slave for her throughout her life. Mohan Raj gets furious on seeing this and kills both Vaishnavi and Seenu. He returns to meet his brother Madhankumar and narrates the happenings. Mohan Raj sets out in search of girls cheating in the name of love to kill them. Flashback ends here.

Police investigates about Mohan Raj and gets all evidence about his existence. Madhankumar is released from the case. Now Urvashi apologizes to Madhankumar and also proposes her love towards him which he rejects saying that he does not love her. Urvashi leaves the place saying that she will wait for Madhankumar believing he will accept her love someday.

The story again moves to a flashback where it is shown only to audience that it is Madhankumar who is behind all the murders. Mohan Raj meets his brother, informs about the happenings and commits suicide. Madhankumar decide to take revenge for his brother's death by killing girls who cheat in the name of love. He hides his brother's death thereby making him to be absconding so that he can escape in case of being caught. The movie ends showing that Madhankumar has hidden his love towards Urvashi as he will still proceed killing such girls.

== Cast ==
- Aditya as Madankumar/Putta (Mohanraj)
- Samiksha as Urvashi
- Charmila as Vaishnavi
- Shobaraj as ACP Kachingatti
- Ramesh Bhat as Madankumar's and Mohan Raj's uncle
- Bullet Prakash as ACP Deva's constable
- Vishwas Bharadwaj as Seenu, Vaishnavi's cousin
- Lakshmi Musuri as Sapna, Urvashi's friend

== Soundtrack ==
Madana

Soundtrack album by Yuvan Shankar Raja
- Released: 25 September 2006
- Recorded: 2006
- Genre: Film soundtrack
- Length: 28:06
- Label: Ashwini Audio
- Producer: Yuvan Shankar Raja

Yuvan Shankar Raja chronology
Paruthiveeran (2006)	Madana (2006)	Thaamirabharani (2006)

The music was scored by noted Tamil film composer Yuvan Shankar Raja, who had scored the music of the original film as well. The soundtrack features 6 tracks, which were retained from the original version. The lyrics were provided by K. Kalyan, V. Nagendra Prasad and V. Manohar.

No.	Title	Lyrics	Singer(s)	Length
1.	"Kannu Ninnadu"	K. Kalyan	KK	6:46
2.	"Minchu Ondu"	K. Kalyan	Anoop, Chetan Sosca	1:49
3.	"Onde Balli"	V. Manohar	Rajesh Krishnan, Chetan Sosca	4:39
4.	"Taathai Taathai"	V. Nagendra Prasad	Anoop, Chaitra H. G.	5:53
5.	"Tentalli Titanic"	V. Nagendra Prasad	Shankar Mahadevan, Shamita Malnad	4:24
6.	"Yaarivanu"	K. Kalyan	Shreya Ghoshal	4:35
