= Katthegalu Saar Katthegalu =

2003 Indian film directed by Rajendra Singh Babu

- VCD Cover
- Directed by: Rajendra Singh Babu
- Written by: Rajendra Singh Babu
- Produced by: Jai Jagadish; Vijayalakshmi Singh; Dushyanth Singh; Srinidhi
- Starring: Ramesh Aravind; S. Narayan; Komal Kumar; Meghana Naidu
- Cinematography: P. K. H. Das
- Edited by: B. S. Kemparaju
- Music by: Hamsalekha
- Production company: Lakshmi Creations
- Release date: 28 March 2003
- Running time: 154 mins
- Country: India
- Language: Kannada

Katthegalu Saar Katthegalu (transl. Donkeys, sir, donkeys) is a 2003 Indian Kannada-language comedy film directed by Rajendra Singh Babu. The film stars Ramesh Aravind, S. Narayan, Komal Kumar, Meghana Naidu and Urvashi. This is the third film in the Kurigalu Saar Kurigalu series directed by Babu and was released on 28 March 2003 and received generally positive reviews from the critics.

== Cast ==
- Ramesh Aravind as Romy
- S. Narayan as Nani
- Komal Kumar as Komi
- Ruthika as Ramya
- Urvashi as Urmila
- Meghana Naidu as Nandhini
- Soni Raj as Kapila
- Umashree as Jayamma
- Yamuna Murthy
- Manjula
- Jai Jagadish as Prakash
- Sundar Raj
- Kote Prabhakar
- M. P. Shankar
- Kirloskar Sathya
- Bullet Prakash
- Sathyajith
- Harish Rai
- Renuka Prasad
- Bank Suresh
- MS Narasimhamurthy

== Soundtrack ==
Katthegalu Saar Katthegalu

Soundtrack album by Hamsalekha
- Released: 2003
- Genre: Feature film soundtrack
- Label: Lakshmi Audio

Track #	Song	Singer(s)	Lyrics
1	"Daga Donkey"	S. P. Balasubrahmanyam	Hamsalekha
2	"Allalle Allalle"	Udit Narayan, Nandini	Hamsalekha
3	"Eno Thumba Kushiyagidiya"	Rajesh Krishnan, Hemanth Kumar, Chetan Sosca	Hamsalekha
4	"Sathyavantharige Idu Kalavalla"	Rajesh Krishnan, Hemanth Kumar, Chetan Sosca	Hamsalekha
5	"Jaya Jayahe"	S. P. Balasubrahmanyam	Hamsalekha
6	"Lucky Lucky"	Shankar Mahadevan, Malgudi Subha	Hamsalekha

== Release and reception ==
The film competed with forty-one other films for the Karnataka State Film Awards, but it was not nominated.

A critic from Viggy wrote that "In a nutshell, is a watchable film if you opt for an average comedy entertainer". A critic from Chitraloka said that "For every five minutes in this nearly 2 hours 40 minutes film the audience would laugh. They feel a respite as scores of Kannada films doled out below average films in the last three months leaving a danger. However Babu’s ‘KK3’ finally gives wonderful output". India Info wrote "Its time D. Rajendra Singh Babu uses his talent for some script which is really worthwhile rather that these Kathe's, Kothi's and Kudure's".

== Box office ==
The film's budget was negatively affected by the change of timings in Kannada and Hindi film theatres.
