= Himapatha =

- Directed by: Rajendra Singh Babu
- Written by: T. K. Rama Rao
- Based on: Himapatha by T. K. Rama Rao
- Produced by: Rockline Venkatesh
- Starring: Vishnuvardhan; Jaya Prada; Suhasini
- Cinematography: D. V. Rajaram
- Edited by: Suresh Urs
- Music by: Hamsalekha
- Production company: Lakshmi Arts
- Release date: November 22, 1995
- Running time: 144 minutes
- Country: India
- Language: Kannada

Himapatha (transl. Snowfall) is a 1995 Indian Kannada-language romantic drama film directed by Rajendra Singh Babu and produced by Rockline Venkatesh. The film stars Vishnuvardhan, Suhasini and Jaya Prada. The film was widely popular for the songs composed by Hamsalekha upon release. The film was extensively shot in Shimla and Bijapur. It is based on the Kannada novel of the same name, by T. K. Rama Rao.

== Plot ==
The plot revolves around a photographer Aravind (Dr. Vishnuvardhan) of Kannada Prabha. He works in Bijapur. He is in love with Sumithra (Suhasini). One day, Kittanna, the editor of Kannada Prabha gives him an offer to take the photos of avalanche occurrences in Shimla. Kittanna wants to send those photos to National Geographic Magazine. At the same time, Sumithra's mother challenges Aravind to earn ₹ 3,00,000 within a month. If he fails, Sumithra's wedding would take place with Keerthi (Jai Jagadish). Aravind goes to Shimla. What happens next is the rest of the story.

== Cast ==
- Vishnuvardhan as Aravind / Gautham
- Suhasini as Sumithra
- Jaya Prada as Naina
- C. R. Simha as Professor, Naina's father
- Jai Jagadish as Dr. Keerthi
- Jayanthi as Fathima Didi
- Leelavathi as Aravind's mother
- Umashree as Geetha, Sumithra's Friend
- Bank Janardhan as d'Souza
- Sudheer as Abdullah, Fathima's husband
- Dingri Nagaraj as Barber
- M. S. Umesh as Geetha's husband

== Production ==
Rocklike Venkatesh was supposed to produce a movie for V. Ravichandran which was to be directed by Dwarakish. However, owing to differences between the lead actor and the director, the movie was stalled and the director walked out of the project after the issue reached the Director's Association which was headed by Rajendra Singh Babu at that time. At this juncture, Venkatesh asked Babu to direct a movie for him for which Babu pitched the idea to adapt T. K. Rama Rao's novel Himpaata whose story he felt had the shades of his favourite movies like Doctor Zhivago (1965), Sunflower (1970) and Daag (1973). Since avalanche was an important sequence in the story, the director decided to shoot it at Ladakh to make the sequence look real. V. Harikrishna was working as a keyboard player to Hamsalekha at that time. The film was launched at Kanteerava Studios with Chiranjeevi and Dr. Rajkumar attending as guests. The first day of shoot was held at Rohtang Pass where the scenes of snowfall were shot that day and the song "Kanchanaganga" was shot in the same location next day. Stunt master Different Danny worked as a body double for Vishnuvardhan for a sequence of him falling in flowing river in Mekedatu at the height of 170 feet. There was a slight delay in arrival of Suhasini on the sets due to bombings near her home. Her solo song was later picturised in Kullu and Manali.

== Soundtrack ==
Himapatha

Soundtrack album by Hamsalekha
- Released: 1995
- Genre: Feature film soundtrack
- Length: 26:10
- Label: Lahari Music

The music of the film was composed and lyrics written by Hamsalekha. The audio was released by Lahari Music company.

Track listing
No.	Title	Lyrics	Singer(s)	Length
1.	"Oho Sundare Vasundhare"	Hamsalekha	S. P. Balasubrahmanyam, K. S. Chithra
2.	"Dooradinda Bande"	Hamsalekha	S. Janaki
3.	"Ee Kanchana Ganga"	Hamsalekha	S. P. Balasubrahmanyam, S. Janaki
4.	"Thereyo Manjina"	Hamsalekha	S. P. Balasubrahmanyam, K. S. Chithra
5.	"Love Bloody Love"	Hamsalekha	Manjula Gururaj, K. S. Chithra, Rajesh Krishnan
