= T. K. Rama Rao =

Indian Kannada novelist (1929-1988)

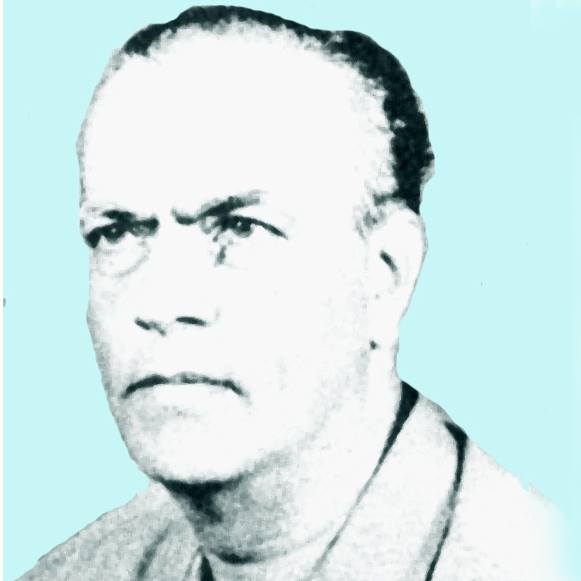
- Born: 7 October 1929; Hosadurga, India
- Died: 10 November 1988 (aged 59); Bangalore, India
- Education: National College, Bangalore
- Known for: Detective novels in Kannada and also popular as "Suspense Ramrao"

T. K. Rama Rao (7 October 1929 – 10 November 1988) was an Indian novelist of Kannada literature. He became popular in the early 1970s when his book Bangaaradha Manushya was made into a hit movie in the Kannada film industry. It inspired many youths to leave the city and return to their villages to look after their ancestral land. He won the Karnataka Sahitya Academy. award. Many of his works are detective novels, which sold millions of copies.

== Biography ==
Rao was born in a Madhwa Brahmin family in Hosadurga, Karnataka. He was the second child of T. Krishnamurthy and Nagamma. His father was a railway stationmaster, who died of a heart attack when TK Ramarao was 18 years old. Rao left his education to take care of his mother and six brothers and sisters. He started his own tutorials in Channapatna, Karnataka, and ran a pharmacy to take care of his family while continuing to write. Several of his novels were adapted to movies and television.

He has written several novels, including Bangarada Manushya, Maralu Sarapani, Varna Chakra, Payanada Kone, Paschinmada Betta, Kahale Bande, Manninadoni, Jagadevaraya, Kovi Kuncha, Trikonada Mane, Golada Melondu Suttu, and Kempu Mannu. He started with social novels but most of his novels are detective novels. He was the first novelist in Karnataka to write thrillers. His social novels had shades of suspense or thriller. He has won several awards from the Karnataka Sahitya Academy and Madras Sahitya Academy. Rao had a heart attack when he was returning from an award ceremony. He died at the age of 59 and was survived by his wife Shakuntala..

Nine of his novels have been made into a total of ten Kannada movies. Out of these, eight movies have retained the titles of novels as they were also the official adaptations, namely Bangaarada Manushya, Maralu Sarapani, Mannina Doni, Mooru Janma, Sedina Hakki, Seelu Nakshatra, Himapatha and Varna Chakra. Another story Haavillada Hutta was unofficially adapted as Appa Nanjappa Maga Gunjappa and was also the source of inspiration for the 2024 movie Shakhahaari.

== Works ==
=== Novels ===
1. Doora Gagana/ದೂರ ಗಗನ
2. Pachche Torana/ಪಚ್ಚೆ ತೇೂರಣ
3. Jagadevaraya/ಜಗದೇವರಾಯ
4. Bangarada Manushya/ಬಂಗಾರದ ಮನುಷ್ಯ
5. Maralu Sarapani/ಮರಳು ಸರಪಣಿ
6. Paschimada Betta/ಪಶ್ಚಿಮದ ಬೆಟ್ಟ
7. Mooru Janma/ಮೂರು ಜನ್ಮ
8. Chukkeya Parivala/ಚುಕ್ಕೆಯ ಪಾರಿವಾಳ
9. Kempu Mannu/ಕೆಂಪು ಮಣ್ಣು
10. Payanada Kone/ಪಯಣದ ಕೊನೆ
11. Ashadha Ratrigalu/ಆಷಾಢ ರಾತ್ರಿಗಳು
12. Varna Chakra/ವರ್ಣ ಚಕ್ರ
13. Mannina Doni/ಮಣ್ಣಿನ ದೇೂಣಿ
14. Kahale Bande/ಕಹಳೆ ಬಂಡೆ
15. Sarpa Dande/ಸರ್ಪ ದಂಡೆ
16. Sedina hakki/ಸೇಡಿನ ಹಕ್ಕಿ
17. Padmaraga/ಪದ್ಮರಾಗ
18. Kanive Seridavalu/ಕಣಿವೆ ಸೇರಿದವಳು
19. Kanasugara/ಕನಸುಗಾರ
20. Nakshatra Meenu/ನಕ್ಷತ್ರ ಮೀನು
21. Himapata/ಹಿಮಪಾತ
22. Seelu nakshtra/ಸೀಳು ನಕ್ಷತ್ರ
23. Aarida landra/ಆರಿದ ಲಾಂದ್ರ
24. Taale Hoo/ತಾಳೆ ಹೂ
25. Bedaru Bombe/ಬೆದರು ಬೊಂಬೆ
26. Alemari/ಅಲೆಮಾರಿ
27. Aakashadeepa/ಆಕಾಶದೀಪ
28. Nadiya tiruvu/ನದಿಯ ತಿರುವು
29. Kovi Kuncha/ಕೇೂವಿ ಕುಂಚ
30. Mooraneya Kilikai/ಮೂರನೆಯ ಕೀಲಿ ಕೈ
31. Trikonada Mane/ತ್ರಿಕೇೂನದ ಮನೆ
32. Dibbada Bangale/ದಿಬ್ಬದ ಬಂಗಲೆ
33. Raani Jenu/ರಾಣಿ ಜೇನು
34. Doorada Kare
35. Gulam Hennu/ಗುಲಾಮ ಹೆಣ್ಣು
36. Vajrada Kombu/ವಜ್ರದ ಕೊಂಬು
37. Neralu/ನೆರಳು
38. Langaru/ಲಂಗರು
39. Kappu Nayi/ಕಪ್ಪು ನಾಯಿ
40. Toru Beralu/ತೇೂರು ಬೆರಳು
41. Donku Mara/ಡೊಂಕು ಮರ
42. Doorada Kare/ದೂರದ ಕರೆ
43. Shakuna Pakshi/ಶಕುನ ಪಕ್ಷಿ
44. Rahasya Patra/ರಹಸ್ಯ ಪತ್ರ
45. Chitravati/ಚಿತ್ರಾವತಿ
46. Bannada Hulu/ಬಣ್ಣದ ಹುಳು
47. Madhura Milana/ಮಧುರ ಮಿಲನ
48. Aasareya Bombe/ಆಸರೆಯ ಬೊಂಬೆ
49. Seemarekhe/ಸೀಮಾರೇಖೆ
50. Nigoodharu/ನಿಗೂಢರು
51. Jodi Chaye/ಜೇೂಡಿ ಛಾಯೆ
52. Havillada Hutta/ಹಾವಿಲ್ಲದ ಹುತ್ತ
53. Paschima Mukhi/ಪಶ್ಚಿಮ ಮುಖಿ
54. Sogugaati
55. Apsara

=== Short stories ===
1. Ubbaravilita/ಉಬ್ಬರವಿಳಿತ
2. Hedi/ಹೇಡಿ
3. Nalku Rekhegalu/ನಾಲ್ಕು ರೇಖೆಗಳು
4. Ettarada Maneyavanu/ಎತ್ತರದ ಮನೆಯವನು
5. Madhuchandra/ಮಧುಚಂದ್ರ
6. Benkigoodu/ಬೆಂಕಿಗೂಡು
7. Kallu Hasige/ಕಲ್ಲು ಹಾಸಿಗೆ
8. Koneya Sakshi/ಕೊನೆಯ ಸಾಕ್ಷಿ
9. Kolliya Hana/ಕೊಲ್ಲಿಯ ಹಣ
10. Aparathriya Aatmiya/ಅಪರಾತ್ರಿಯ ಆತ್ಮೀಯ
11. Shilpadrushyagalu/ಶಿಲ್ಪದೃಶ್ಯಗಳು
12. UruGolu/ಊರುಗೋಲು

=== Travelogue ===
1. Golada Melondu Suttu/ಗೇೂಳದ ಮೇಲೊಂದು ಸುತ್ತು

== Novels adapted as films ==
Novels	Films
Bangarada Manushya	Bangaarada Manushya
Mannina Doni	Mannina Doni
Mooru Janma	Mooru Janma
Sedina Hakki	Sedina Hakki
Himapatha	Himapatha
Seelu Nakshatra	Seelu Nakshatra
Varnachakra	Varnachakra
Maralu Sarapani	Maralu Sarapani
Haavillada Hutta	Appa Nanjappa Maga Gunjappa and Shakhahaari (both uncredited)
