= Mannina Doni =

- Directed by: M. S. Rajashekar
- Screenplay by: T. N. Narasimhan
- Story by: T. K. Rama Rao
- Based on: Mannina Doni by T. K. Rama Rao
- Produced by: Sandesh Nagaraj
- Starring: Ambareesh; Sudharani
- Cinematography: B. C. Gowrishankar
- Edited by: S. Manohar
- Music by: Hamsalekha
- Production company: Sandesh Combines
- Distributed by: R. F. Productions
- Release date: 22 September 1992
- Running time: 133 minutes
- Country: India
- Language: Kannada

Mannina Doni (lit. 'Earthen Boat') is a 1992 Indian Kannada-language romance drama film directed by M. S. Rajashekar based on a novel of the same name by T. K. Rama Rao. The film stars Ambareesh and Sudharani. Chi. Guru Dutt, Vanitha Vasu, Vajramuni, Jai Jagadish and Umashree feature in supporting roles. The film was appreciated for its songs by Hamsalekha and lead actors performances upon release.

== Plot synopsis ==
Karthik, a novelist, meets Sowbhagya, a young woman, on his visit to the meadows, and both fall in love. Despite her father's disapproval, the two get married and head to Mysuru, where a mystery begins to unfold.

== Cast ==
- Ambareesh as Karthik
- Sudharani as Sowbhagya a.k.a. Padmavathi
- Vanitha Vasu as Sharmila
- Vajramuni as Bernard a.k.a. Ramayya
- Mukhyamantri Chandru as advocate
- Jai Jagadish as Jagadish
- Ramesh Bhat as Mallikarjuna
- Chi. Guru Dutt as Sudhakar
- Avinash as Pradeep
- K. S. Ashwath as Chandrashekhaiah
- Thoogudeepa Srinivas as Veerabhadra
- Pandari Bai as Karthik's mother
- Umashree as Meenakshi
- Ashalatha as Kanakamma
- Girija Lokesh as Janaki

== Soundtrack ==
The music of the film was composed and lyrics written by Hamsalekha, and the entire soundtrack was well received extremely well. Audio was released on Lahari Music.

Track listing
No.	Title	Singer(s)	Length
1.	"Kogileye Kshemave"	S. Janaki
2.	"Rajanu Rani"	S. P. Balasubrahmanyam, K. S. Chithra
3.	"Male Male Male Male"	S. P. Balasubrahmanyam, K. S. Chithra
4.	"Nandu Nindu Indu"	S. P. Balasubrahmanyam, K. S. Chithra
5.	"Megha Banthu Megha"	Rajkumar, Chorus
6.	"Theme Humming (Background)"	Manjula Gururaj

== Reception ==
The Hindu listed this film alongside five other films for which Ambareesh earned critical acclaim for his acting.
