= Muddina Kanmani =

- DVD cover
- Directed by: Ravi Kottarakara
- Written by: Rajasenan; Rafi Mecartin
- Based on: Aadyathe Kanmani
- Produced by: Ravi Kottarakara
- Starring: Shiva Rajkumar; Saikumar; Shilpa; Maathu
- Cinematography: Krishna Kumar
- Edited by: Sukumaran
- Music by: S. P. Venkatesh
- Production company: Ganesh Pictures
- Release date: 1 August 1997
- Running time: 143 minutes
- Country: India
- Language: Kannada

Muddina Kanmani is a 1997 Indian Kannada-language drama film, directed and produced by Ravi Kottarakara The film stars Shiva Rajkumar, Sai Kumar, Shilpa and Maathu. The film was a remake of director Rajasenan's Malayalam film Aadyathe Kanmani (1995).

== Plot ==
Shivu's mother dreams to have a grandson but when his wife delivers a baby girl, a fearful Shivu temporarily brings home his friend's baby boy instead of his newborn daughter.

== Cast ==
- Shiva Rajkumar as Shivaram Hegde
- Sai Kumar as Chandru
- Maathu as Ambika
- Shilpa as Hema
- Umashri as Mittemari Meenakshi Hegde, Shivaram's Mother
- C. R. Simha as Hegde, Shivaram's Father
- Ramesh Bhat as Sridhar Hegde, Shivaram's First Brother
- Shobharaj as Gudibande Gundayya
- Tennis Krishna as Chengumari
- Bank Janardhan as Ambika's Father
- M D Kaushik as Shivram's younger brother

== Soundtrack ==
The soundtrack of the film was composed by S. P. Venkatesh.

Track listing
No.	Title	Lyrics	Singer(s)	Length
1.	"Endendu Ninnanu Marethu"	Geethapriya	S. P. Balasubrahmanyam, K. S. Chithra	4:34
2.	"Modalane Rathriyali"	Doddarangegowda	S. P. Balasubrahmanyam, K. S. Chithra	5:07
3.	"Manasu Navilinanthe"	Doddarangegowda	S. P. Balasubrahmanyam, K. S. Chithra	4:07
4.	"Nanna Chinna"	Geethapriya	S. P. Balasubrahmanyam, Prabhakar	4:02
5.	"Mutthina Aarathi"	Geethapriya	Chorus	0:38
6.	"Siribhoomi Neenagi"	Doddarangegowda	S. P. Balasubrahmanyam, K. S. Chithra	4:49
