= Kalavu (2013 film) =

Film by Ravi M

- Directed by: Ravi M
- Written by: KY Narayanaswamy
- Based on: Kalavu by K Y Narayanaswamy
- Produced by: Murali Gurappa, Manjula Somasekhar
- Starring: Umashree; Kari Subbu
- Cinematography: Rakesh B
- Edited by: Murali Gurappa
- Music by: S Chinna
- Distributed by: Kannada Circle
- Release date: 20 December 2013
- Country: India
- Language: Kannada

Kalavu (Kannada: ಕಳವು) is a 2013 Indian Kannada-language film directed by newcomer Ravi M. The film stars Umashree, Kari Subbu, Hulagappa Kattimani and others.

== Cast ==
- Umashree as Rangamma
- Kari Subbu
- Hulagappa Kattimani
- Jugari Avinash as Patla
- Shivaji Rao Jadav as Idea
- Pramila Bengre as Thayamma
- Bhavani Prakash as Rathni
- Master Vaibhav

== Release ==
=== Critical reception ===
A critic from The Times of India wrote that "Umashree is the right choice for the role as she steals the show with her brilliant performance". B. S. Srivani from Deccan Herald wrote that "Most of the actors, led so ebulliently by Jadhav, act out their parts well, allowing the viewer to enjoy the experience thoroughly".
