= Madesha =

- Directed by: Ravi Srivatsa
- Written by: Ravi Srivatsa
- Produced by: B. M. Govardhana Murthy
- Starring: Shiva Rajkumar; Sonu Bhatia
- Cinematography: G S V Seetharam
- Edited by: Lakshman reddy
- Music by: Mano Murthy
- Release date: 28 August 2008
- Country: India
- Language: Kannada

Madesha is a 2008 Indian Kannada-language action-thriller film directed by Ravi Srivatsa and starring Shiva Rajkumar and Sonu Bhatia. The movie was released in August. Audio was launched on 24 Jun 2008.

== Cast ==
- Shiva Rajkumar as Madesha
- Sonu Bhatia
- Ravi Belagere as Sarkar
- Ravi Kale as Ashok Kumar
- Ramesh Pandit as Guru Narayan
- Muniraj as Naidu
- Bullet Prakash as member of madesha gang
- Kote Prabhakar as member of madesha gang
- Raghuram as Kencha
- Harish Rai as member of madesha gang
- Yathiraj as member of madesha gang
- Arun Sagar
- Prakash Heggodu
- Padmaja Rao as Madesha's mother
- M. N. Lakshmi Devi
- R. G. Vijayasarathy as Home Minister Chadaga
- Praveen
- Mallesh
- H. G. Dattatreya
- Ashwath Narayana
- Sathish Ninasam as Guru Narayan's henchman
- Jyothi Rana in a special appearance in song "Thaaramayya"
- Ravi Srivatsa as himself (uncredited)

== Soundtrack ==
Madesha

Soundtrack album by Mano Murthy
- Released: 24 June 2008
- Recorded: 2008
- Genre: Soundtrack
- Length: 38:08
- Label: T-Series
- Producer: Mano Murthy

Mano Murthy chronology
Moggina Manasu (2008)	Madesha (2008)	Bombaat (2008)

The music was composed by Mano Murthy and released by T-Series.

Track list
No.	Title	Lyrics	Singer(s)	Length
1.	"Tirugo E. Bhoomige"	Kaviraj	Vijay Prakash	5:14
2.	"Aa – A – A Thatharamaiah"	V. Manohar	Sunidhi Chauhan, Hemanth	5:03
3.	"Munjane Manjagu"	Kaviraj	Kunal Ganjawala, Supriya Lohith	5:04
4.	"Madesha"	V. Nagendra Prasad	Gurukiran	4:34
5.	"Lahari – Male"	Jayanth Kaikini	Sonu Nigam	5:01
6.	"Gantu Gantu"	Hrudaya Shiva	Hemanth, Keshav, Shri Vidhya	5:15
7.	"Lahari – Female"	Jayanth Kaikini	Shreya Ghoshal	5:01
8.	"Gayatri Mantra"	Traditional	Traditional	2:56
Total length:				38:08

== Reception ==
=== Critical response ===
R G Vijayasarathy of Rediff.com scored the film at 3 out of 5 stars and says "Mano Murthy has composed music for an action film for the first time. His songs have variety, but they are not exceptional. The background score by Sadhu Kokila is good. Maadesha is an enjoyable film for Shivraj Kumar fans". A critic from Bangalore Mirror wrote "But the rest of the film is a glorified killing field. In one particular scene the state home minister writes a cheque for Rs 50 lakh to an underworld don to take on a rival. This shows the director’s lack of knowledge beyond guns and machetes". A critic from Sify.com wrote "G.S.V.Seetharam the silent and sensible cameraman of Kannada cinema gives a splendid work. The top angles shots in Australia for the song is brilliant. Action lovers and die hard Shivrajkumar will love it".

=== Box office ===
15 years after the release, the director had claimed that the movie earned a theatrical share of ₹3.5 crores and the satellite rights fetched them ₹99 lakhs – then the highest for a Kannada film- plus they earned additional ₹27 lakhs vide audio rights – making the total net income of ₹4.76 crores as against a total budget of ₹4.50 crores. But he accused that the ₹3.5 crores from theatrical run were never paid to his producer by the distributors since his producer was imprisoned due to personal issue while the movie was still running in theatres on its 48th day and when the movie was removed after its 63-day run, the distributors – Pal Chandani and his son Ajay Chandani – both met with untimely death resulting in nobody to claim the amount from either side.
