= C. Basavalingaiah =

Indian theatre director (born 1958)

- Born: 29 July 1958; Bangalore, India
- Education: National School of Drama; University of Mysore
- Occupation: Theatre director
- Employers: National School of Drama, Bangalore Centre; Rangayana
- Known for: Theatre Direction of Kuvempu's Malegalalli madumagalu
- Awards: Shivakumara State Level Award (2010); Sri K.V. Shankaregowda Award (2010); Karnataka State Award (Rajyotsava Award) (2001); Karnataka Nataka Academy Honorary Fellowship (1996)

C. Basavalingaiah (born 29 July 1958, India) is an Indian theatre director and theatre activist. He has been appointed as the first director of the National School of Drama Bangalore Centre. He directed several stage plays that received wide attention. He is an alumnus of the National School of Drama. The views expressed by him on challenges faced by theatre in India today are thought provoking He received many awards including Karnataka State Award Rajyotsava Award in 2001.

== Biography ==
C. Basavalingaiah was born in Bangalore, Karnataka. After his school and college he was selected for a three-year course in the National School of Drama.

== Education ==
- Post Graduation in Theatre Direction, National School of Drama, Delhi
- MA in Kannada Literature, University of Mysore

== Major contributions ==
Inspired by B. V. Karanth, his subsequent efforts have significantly contributed to develop theater as a medium of entertainment and a tool for social change. Kuvempu's Malegalalli madumagalu (The Bride in the Mountains) a popular play was directed by Basavalingiah. This play was staged more than 15 times in Bangalore and Mysore, and this play was showcased to nearly 60,000 audience.

His contributions were featured in Ramayana Stories in Modern South India: An Anthology

== Plays directed ==
- Devanooru Mahadeva's Kusumabale
- The Road
- Antigone
- Andhayuga
- Gandhi V/S Gandhi
- Shoodra Thapasvi
- Tippuvina Kanasugalu
- King Oedipus
- Berlge Koral
- Alamana Adbhuta Nyaya
- Erobi
- Shakespeare's A Mid Summer Night's Dreams
- Agni Mattu Male
- Hitler V/s. Brecht
- Malegalalli madumagalu (based on the book by Kuvempu)
- 2009 and 2014 – Manushya Jati Tanode Valam – a sound and light show for Information Department
- 2006 - Lankesharige Namaskaara, (stage adaptation of P. Lankesh's one act plays, poetry, short story, teeke-tippani, etc.)
- 2005 - Directed a mega play JANAPADA MAHABHAARATH for children, in which 400 children performed and was well appreciated by the mass & media.
- Samaba Shiva Prahasana
- Pagala Raja
- Jangamadedege
- MacBeth
- Venara Vemana
- Sewooz Nagarath Shin Shular Brutho
- Ekalavya's Thumb
- Edegaarike

== Awards ==
- 2010 - Shivakumara State Level Award, honoured by Sirigere Bruhanmata, Sanehalli, Karnataka
- 2010 - Sri K.V. Shankaregowda Award
- 2001 - Karnataka State Award (Rajyotsava Award)
- 1996 - Karnataka Nataka Academy, Honorary Fellowship Award
