= Deadly-2 =

- Poster
- Directed by: Ravi Srivatsa
- Written by: Ravi Srivatsa
- Based on: Life of the Deadly Soma
- Produced by: M Manjunath Gowda
- Starring: Aditya; Meghana; Suhasini; Devaraj; Madhu Guruswamy
- Cinematography: Mathew Rajan
- Edited by: Lakshman Reddy
- Music by: L. N. Shastry
- Production company: K K Films
- Release date: 13 August 2010
- Running time: 126 minutes
- Country: India
- Language: Kannada

Deadly-2 is a 2010 Indian Kannada-language biographical crime film directed and written by Ravi Srivatsa. The film is based on the real life incidents of an infamous underworld don, Soma and is a sequel to the same team's 2005 released film, Deadly Soma. The film stars Auditya reprising his role as the protagonist and Meghana as his lady love replacing Rakshita in the prequel. Suhasini Maniratnam, Devaraj and Ravi Kale play other pivotal roles.

The film featured the original score composed by L. N. Shastry. The film, upon release, received a mixed response from both critics and audience and got a negative publicity owing to the violence being glorified throughout the film.

== Plot ==
Soma (Audithya) is a talented cricketer-turned-underworld don. An incident where Soma is asked to cough up a 10 lakh bribe so as to be included in the state cricket team turns his life upside down.

Not only does the selector leave out Soma's name from the final list, but he also refuses to return the money. What ticks off Soma, even more, is a swear word uttered by the selector. In an impulsive act of rage, Soma kills the selector and thus begins his liaison with the Bangalore crime scene.

Soma, having emerged as one of the most wanted criminals, is on the hit list of police officers Ashok, Mani, and Ugrappa. Does he fall to their bullets? And is there any connection between him and the Soma in Deadly Soma?

== Cast ==
- Aditya as Somashekara
- Meghana as Hasini
- Devaraj as Vishwajeet Deshmukh
- Suhasini Maniratnam
- Ravi Kale
- Praveen
- Sangeetha
- Aaryan Achukatla (Police Officer)
- Syed Kirmani in a guest appearance
- Madhu Guruswamy as Kencha
- Prathap Narayan as Anila
- Karthik Jayaram

== Music ==
The background music was composed by L. N. Shastry. There is only one situational song composed by him for the film.

== Reception ==
=== Critical response ===
Shruti Indira Lakshminarayana of Rediff.com scored the film at 2.5 out of 5 stars and says "Dialogues are crass at most places and slangs dominate the film. However the film despite having 131 scenes, moves at a brisk pace. There being just one situational song works as an advantage. Ultimately Deadly 2 is for those who are up for seeing non-stop glorification of violence". A critic from The Times of India scored the film at 3 out of 5 stars and wrote "The movie ends with a message Live in peace, andabide by the law. While Adityahas given an excellent performance, Devaraj, Ravi Kale, Praveen excel. Suhasini is grace-ful. Meghana has very little workto do.Camera work by Mathew Rajan is eye-catching"

== See also ==
- Deadly Soma
