= Umashree =

Indian politician and actress (born 1957)

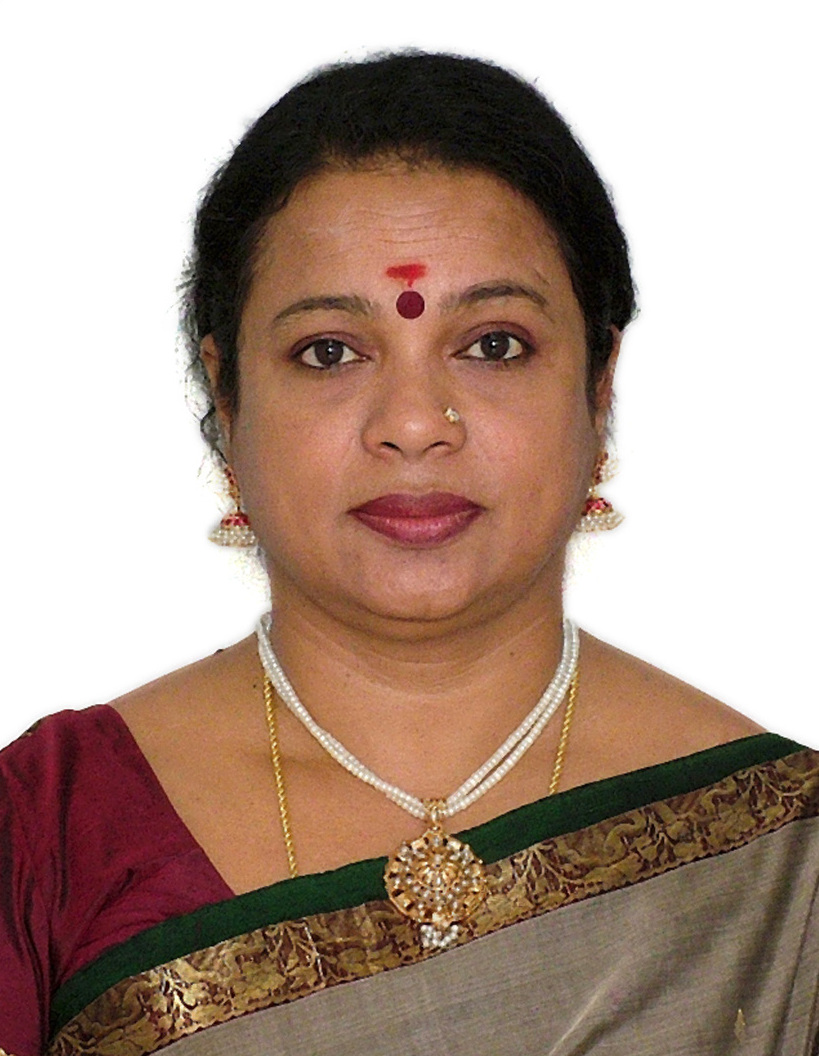

Deputy Chairperson of the Karnataka Legislative Council
- Incumbent
- Assumed office 18 August 2026
- Chairperson: Saleem Ahmed
- Preceded by: M. K. Pranesh
- Constituency: Nominated

Member of Karnataka Legislative Council
- Incumbent
- Assumed office 21 August 2023
- Preceded by: C. M. Lingappa
- Constituency: Nominated

Minister for Women and Child Development Government of Karnataka
- In office 20 May 2013 – 15 May 2018
- Preceded by: Kalakappa G. Bandi
- Succeeded by: Jayamala

Minister for Kannada and Culture Government of Karnataka
- In office 20 May 2013 – 15 May 2018
- Preceded by: Govind M. Karjol
- Succeeded by: Jayamala

Member of Karnataka Legislative Assembly
- In office 17 May 2013 – 15 May 2018
- Preceded by: Siddu Savadi
- Succeeded by: Siddu Savadi
- Constituency: Terdal

Personal details
- Born: Umashree; 10 May 1957 (age 69) Nonavinakere, Tiptur taluk, Tumkur, Mysore State, India
- Party: Indian National Congress
- Profession: Actor (1978–present); Politician (2013–present)

Umashree (born 10 May 1957) is an Indian actress and politician. She appears in Kannada cinema, particularly in character roles and supporting roles. She received the National Film Award for Best Actress for the titular role in the 2008 film Gulabi Talkies.

In 2013, Umashree became a Member of the Legislative Assembly in Karnataka in the government of Siddaramaiah where she was the minister for women and child development, empowerment of disabled and senior citizens, Kannada language and culture.

== Personal life ==
Umashree was born into the Devanga family. She has two children, a daughter named Gayathri, who is a dentist, and a son named Vijayakumar, an advocate, she raised them as a single mother.

== Public office ==
Umashree participates in positive social activities such as supporting rural and disadvantaged women. She performs on stage in rural villages to highlight their needs. Her election in 2013 as the member for Terdal constituency (Congress Party) allowed Umashree to continue her work. Umashree is Minister for Women and Child Development, Kannada and Culture.

== Stage work ==
Umashree has experience in village, amateur, mythological and professional drama. Her directors have included Fritz Bennewitz, B.V. Karanth, Girish Karnad, C. G. Krishnaswamy, and R. Nagesh. She is a member of Rangasampada amateur theatre group of Bangalore. She played Sakavva in the play Odalala.

== Film work ==
Umashree began her movie career in 1984 in a supporting role in Anubhava with Kashinath. But before that she was seen in a 1980 Kannada film Bangarada Jinke directed by T. S. Nagabharana.

However, it typecast her in comedy roles with a degree of innuendo. She worked with the actor N. S. Rao and later with Dinesh, Dwarakish, Mysore lokesh, Sihikahi chandru,Umesh, Ramesh bhat, Mukhyamantri Chandru, Doddanna and Karibasavaiah. Her directors included S. V. Rajendra Singh Babu, Bhargava, Singeetham Srinivasa Rao, Perala, K V Raju, Vijay, Dorai Bhagavan, Dwairakish, D Rajendra babu, Dinesh Babu, V Ravichandran, Puri Jagannath and Yograj Bhat.

== Filmography ==
=== Films ===
- All films are in Kannada, unless otherwise noted.

Year	Title	Role	Notes
1980	Bangarada Jinke	Asha's friend	
1984	Anubhava	Paddi	
1984	Amrutha Ghalige		
1985	Bidugadeya Bedi	Flora	
1985	Naanu Nanna Hendthi	Rao's Wife	
1985	Swabhimana		
1985	Hendthi Beku Hendthi	Rosie	
1985	Sneha Sambandha		
1985	Youvanada Suliyalli		
1985	Amara Jyothi		
1985	Maruthi Mahime		
1985	Balondu Uyyale		
1986	Maneye Manthralaya		
1986	Bete		
1986	27 Mavalli Circle	Rosie	
1986	Asambhava		
1986	Bettada Thayi		
1986	Brahmasthra		
1986	Henne Ninagenu Bandhana		
1986	Kedi No. 1		
1986	Namma Oora Devathe		
1986	Nannavaru		
1986	Samsarada Guttu		
1986	Tiger		
1987	Ee Bandha Anubandha	Prema	
1987	Jayasimha		
1987	Olavina Udugore	Baby	
1987	Sowbhagya Lakshmi	Sundari	
1987	Digvijaya	Shivi	
1987	Bazar Bheema		
1987	Bedi		
1987	Daiva Shakthi	Sundaralakshmi	
1987	Mr. Raja		
1987	Nyayakke Shikshe		
1987	Onde Goodina Hakkigalu		
1987	Thayi	Sangavva	
1987	Thayi Kotta Thali		
1987	Lorry Driver		
1988	Shanthi Nivasa		
1988	Onde Goodina Hakkigalu	Chinnamma	
1988	Ramanna Shamanna		
1988	Krishna Rukmini		
1988	Balondu Bhavageethe		
1988	Anjada Gandu	Mani	
1988	Jana Nayaka		
1988	Ranadheera	Yamuna Bai	
1988	Mathru Vathsalya	Shanti	
1988	Naan Sonnathey Sattam	Andaal	Tamil film
1988	Dharmathma		
1988	Matru Devo Bhava		
1988	Nava Bharatha		
1988	Praja Prabhuthva		
1989	Hrudaya Geethe		
1989	Hongkongnalli Agent Amar		
1989	Ondagi Balu		
1989	Onti Salaga		
1989	Poli Huduga		
1989	Amaanusha		
1989	Doctor Krishna		
1989	Nyayakkaagi Naanu		
1989	Raja Yuvaraja		
1989	Yaru Hone		
1990	Golmaal Radhakrishna	Janaki	
1990	Mruthyunjaya	Ahalya	
1990	Nigooda Rahasya	Lakkanna's Wife	
1990	Rani Maharani		
1990	Ashoka Chakra	Alamelu	
1990	Aavesha	Savitri	
1990	Anantha Prema		
1990	Baare Nanna Muddina Rani		
1990	Challenge Gopalakrishna		
1990	Halliya Surasuraru		
1990	Nammoora Hammeera		
1990	Poli Kitty		
1990	Sididedda Gandu		
1990	Edurumane Meena		
1991	Bangaradantha Maga		
1991	Golmaal Part 2	Janaki	
1991	Ranachandi		
1991	Gruhapravesha		
1991	Kollur Kala		
1991	Neenu Nakkare Haalu Sakkare		
1991	Elukoti Marthanda Bhairava		
1991	Halli Rambhe Belli Bombe		
1991	Ibbaru Hendira Muddina Police		
1991	Kalla Malla		
1991	Kalyana Mantapa		
1991	Kitturina Huli		
1991	Mangalya		
1991	Rollcall Ramakrishna	Uma	
1991	Thavarumane Udugore		
1992	Sriramachandra	Actress	
1992	Shivanaga		
1992	Mannina Doni	Meenakshi	
1992	Malashree Mamashree		
1992	Sangya Balya	Paravva	
1992	Mysore Jaana	Ganga	
1992	Hatamari Hennu Kiladi Gandu		
1992	Hendtheere Hushar		
1992	Nanna Thangi		
1992	Sindhoora Thilaka		
1992	Soori		
1992	Edurmaneli Ganda Pakkadmaneli Hendthi		
1992	Amara Prema		Dual role
1992	Seragu		
1993	Server Somanna		Cameo appearance
1993	Kollura Sri Mookambika	Saraswati	
1993	Bhagavan Sri Saibaba	Sakku	
1993	Hendthi Helidare Kelabeku		
1993	Jamboo Savari		
1993	Mouna Sangrama		
1993	Roopayi Raja		
1993	Olavina Kanike		
1994	Kotreshi Kanasu	Kotra's mother	
1994	Jaana	Mary	
1994	Chinna		
1994	Karulina Koogu	Rukkamma	
1994	Odahuttidavaru	Kamakshi	
1994	September 8		Tulu film
1994	Alexander		
1994	Chinna Nee Naguthiru		
1994	Halunda Thavaru		
1994	Indrana Gedda Narendra		
1994	Love 94		
1994	Musuku		
1994	Sididedda Pandavaru		
1994	Swathi		
1995	Putnanja	Putmalli	
1995	Himapatha	Geetha	
1995	Thumbida Mane	Gangavva	
1995	Bal Nan Maga		
1995	Bombat Raja Bandal Rani		
1995	Killer Diary		
1995	Kona Edaithe		
1995	Rowdy		
1995	Thaliya Sowbhagya		
1996	Jeevanadhi	Santhanamma	
1996	Sipayi		
1996	Ibbara Naduve Muddina Aata		
1996	Aadithya	Pankaja	
1996	Dhani	Umashree	
1996	Circle Inspector		
1996	Godfather		
1997	Kalavida	Prema's mother	
1997	Shreemathi		
1997	Agni IPS	Baasha Khan's mother	
1997	Ellaranthalla Nanna Ganda	Surya's mother	
1997	Maduve	Chamundeshwari	
1997	Muddina Kanmani	Mittemari Meenakshi Hegde	
1997	Thayavva	Thayavva	
1997	Mommaga		
1997	Cheluva	Constable	
1998	Baro Nanna Muddina Krishna		
1998	Maathina Malla		
1998	Hrudayanjali		
1998	Preethsod Thappa	Uma	
1999	Under World		
1999	O Premave		
1999	Naanenu Madlilla		
1999	Chora Chittha Chora		
1999	Manu Needhi		Tamil film
2000	Shabdavedhi	Malathi	
2000	Krishna Leele		
2000	Yarige Salatte Sambala	Subbi	
2000	Sparsha		Cameo appearance
2000	Nan Hendthi Chennagidale	Rangamma	
2000	Ticket Tickets	Savitri	
2001	Diggajaru	Mutthayya's Mother	
2001	Kurigalu Saar Kurigalu	Rukmini	
2001	Ellara Mane Dosenu	Ramani	
2001	Jipuna Nanna Ganda		
2001	Thimmaraya		
2001	Jenu Goodu		
2001	Namma Samsara Ananda Sagara		
2001	Kothigalu Saar Kothigalu	Muniyamma	
2002	Preethi Mado Hudugarigella	Cook	
2002	Chandu	Mary	
2002	Thuntata	"Lingo" Leela	
2002	Simhadriya Simha	Girija	
2003	Laali Haadu	Anand's mother	
2003	Neenandre Ishta	Susheela	
2003	Katthegalu Saar Katthegalu	Jayamma	
2003	Abhi	Haseena Begum	
2003	Nanjundi	Janavva	
2003	Namma Preethiya Ramu	Ramu's mother	
2003	Mani	Shantakka	Karnataka State Film Award for Best Supporting Actress
2004	Malla		
2004	Seenu Vasanthi Lakshmi	Seenu's mother	Telugu film
2004	Ranga (S.S.L.C)	Paaru	
2004	Monalisa		
2004	Ajju		
2006	Veeru	Paru	
2006	Suntaragaali	Jaya	
2006	Gopi		
2006	Chellata	Ganesh's grandmother	
2006	Honeymoon Express		
2006	Ravi Shastri		
2006	Neelakanta		
2007	Parodi		
2007	Ekadantha	Sheela Devi	
2007	Lancha Samrajya		
2007	Masti		
2007	Circle Rowdy		
2008	Vasanthakala		
2008	Minchina Ota		
2008	Gulabi Talkies	Gulabi	National Film Award for Best Actress
2008	Premigagi Naa		
2008	Slum Bala		
2008	Bidda		
2008	Mast Maja Maadi	Keerthi Bedi	
2009	Venkata in Sankata		
2009	Chamkaisi Chindi Udaysi		
2009	Male Barali Manju Irali		
2009	Gilli	Aunt of Anita's friend	Uncredited role
2010	Thipparalli Tharlegalu		
2010	Antharathma	Chowdamma	
2010	Krishnan Love Story		Filmfare Award for Best Supporting Actress – Kannada
2010	Idre Gopi Bidre Paapi		
2010	Jokaali		
2010	Kanasemba Kudureyaneri	Rudri	
2010	Vaare Vah	Bangari	
2011	Boss	Lakshmi	
2011	Sanju Weds Geetha	Sanju's mother	
2011	Prema Chandrama	Nurse	
2011	Rajadhani		
2011	Swayam Krushi		
2011	Ujwaadu		Konkani film
2012	Alemari	Saroja	Nominated—Filmfare Award for Best Supporting Actress – Kannada
2012	Bheema Theeradalli	Chandrappa's sister	Nominated—SIIMA Award for Best Actress in a Supporting Role (Kannada)
2012	Gandhi Smiles		
2012	Rambo	Kitti's mother	
2012	Kalpana	Raghava's mother	
2012	Samsaaradalli Golmaal	Chenni	
2012	Sangolli Rayanna	Kenchamma	
2012	Super Shastri		
2013	Parari	Peede Obayya's mother	
2013	Chathrigalu Saar Chathrigalu	Rajahmundry Rajalakshmi	
2013	Sweety Nanna Jodi		
2013	Kalavu	Rangamma	
2014	Kalyanamasthu		
2014	Ambareesha		
2021	Rathnan Prapancha	Saroja	Karnataka State Film Award for Best Supporting Actress; Filmfare Award for Best Supporting Actress – Kannada
2022	Vedha	Shankri	
2023	Kranti	Kranti's grandmother	
2023	Kaasina Sara		
2026	Landlord		

=== Television ===
Year	Title	Role	Notes	Ref.
	Mussanje Katha Prasanga			
	Mussanje			
	Kicchu			
	Amma Ninagagi			
2019–2020	Aarthigobba Keerthigobba	Puttmalli		
2020	Chinnara Chilipili			
2021–2026	Puttakkana Makkalu	Puttakka		

=== Other television work ===
- Nondavara Haadu, a documentary about leprosy directed by T. S. Ranga for Doordarshan.
- Hattye, a telefilm directed by H. Girijamma for Doordarshan.
