= Rajendra Singh Babu =

Indian film producer and director

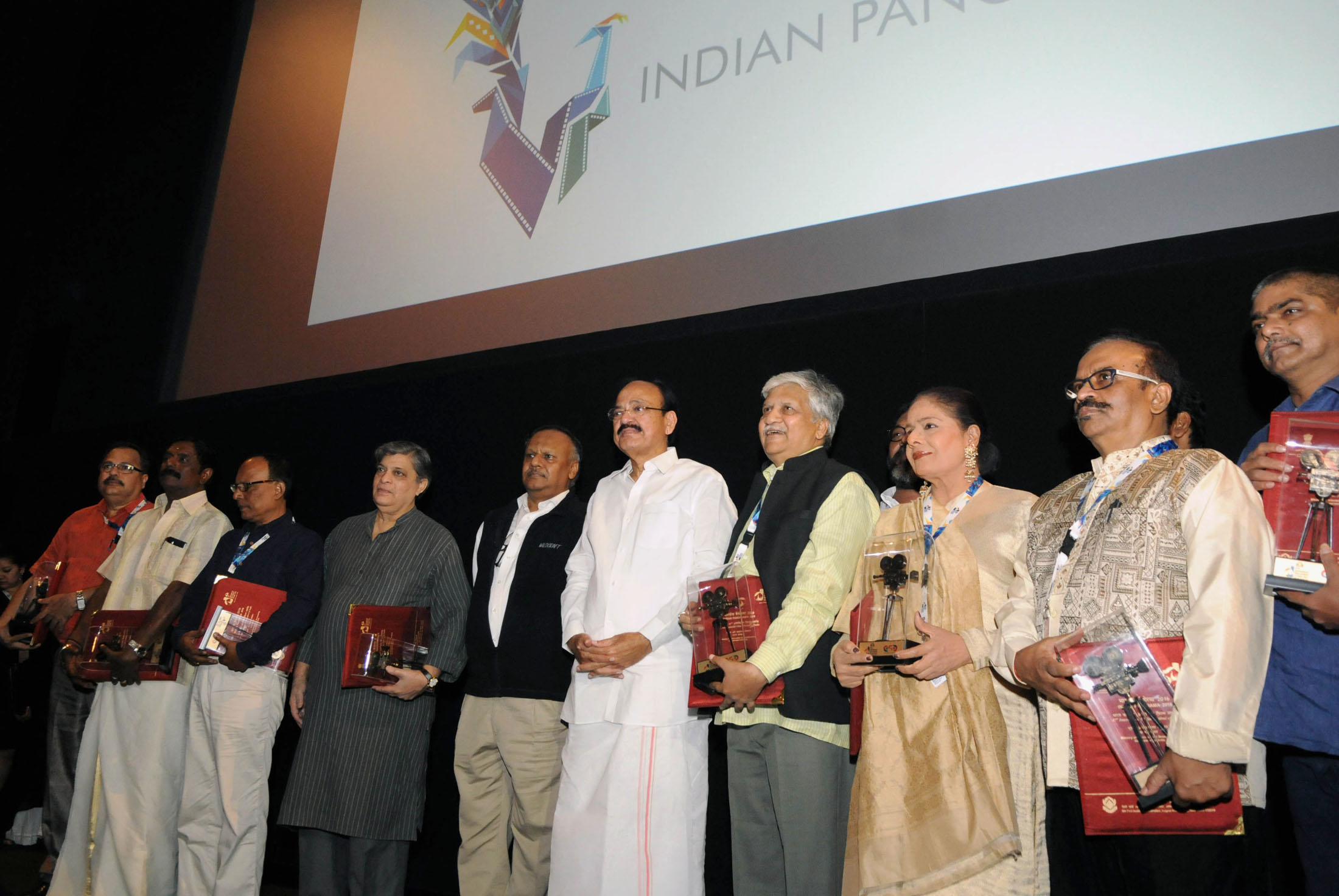
- S. V. Rajendra Singh Babu at IFFI (2016)
- Born: 22 October 1952 (age 74); Mysore, Karnataka, India
- Other name: Babu
- Occupations: Filmmaker, actor
- Years active: 1972–present
- Spouse: Anuradha
- Children: 3, including Adithya and Rishika

Shankar Singh Veera Rajendra Singh, known as S. V. Rajendra Singh Babu (born 22 October 1952), is an Indian filmmaker and occasional actor who works primarily in Kannada cinema. He was born and brought up in Mysore. His father Shankar Singh produced many films under the Mahatma Pictures (Mysore) banner. Babu has written and directed movies of different genres in Kannada and Hindi, including love stories, war, suspense thrillers and comedy movies. Many of his films have been adapted from novels or short stories. Babu has won numerous awards for his films. Producer and actress Vijayalakshmi Singh is his sister, and actor Jai Jagadish his brother-in-law.

== Early life ==
Rajendra Singh Babu was born in Mysore in a Rajput family. His father, the late Shankar Singh, was a producer and director of Kannada films. His mother, Prathima Devi, was an actress in Kannada cinema. In an interview, Babu mentioned that his father wanted him to become a doctor, but his own passion for the camera propelled him to the film industry. Hailing from a family of movie makers, Babu was fascinated with films such as The Great Escape, The Guns of Navarone and The Bridge on the River Kwai. He believes that cinema should go near the audience. He appeared as a child artist in movies like Shivasharane Nambekka (1955) and Bhakta Chetha(1961).

== Financial stress ==
In 2014, he was among four Kannada filmmakers who were declared loan defaulters by IDBI Bank, which had earlier become the only bank to extend loans to Kannada filmmakers.

== Filmography ==
Year	Film	Credited as			Language	Notes
Year	Film	Director	Screenplay	Producer	Language	Notes
1975	Nagakanye	✓	✓	✓	Kannada	
1975	Mahadeshwara Pooja Phala	✗	✓	✓	Kannada	
1977	Nagara Hole	✓	✓	✗	Kannada	
1978	Kiladi Jodi	✓	✓	✗	Kannada	
1981	Bhaari Bharjari Bete	✓	✓	✗	Kannada	
1981	Antha	✓	✓	✗	Kannada	
1981	Simhada Mari Sainya	✓	✓	✗	Kannada	
1981	Meri Aawaz Suno	✓	✓	✗	Hindi	Remake of Antha
1982	Thirugu Baana	✗	✗	✓	Kannada	Remake of Benaam
1982	Tony	✗	✗	✓	Kannada	
1984	Kaliyuga	✗	✗	✓	Kannada	Remake of Avtaar
1984	Gandu Bherunda	✓	✓	✗	Kannada	
1984	Bandhana	✓	✓	✓	Kannada	Based on Usha Navaratnaram's novel
1984	Sharara	✓	✓	✗	Hindi	
1984	Mera Faisla	✓	✓	✗	Hindi	
1985	Ek Se Bhale Do	✓	✓	✗	Hindi	
1985	Pithamaha	✗	✗	✓	Kannada	Remake of Vidhaata
1985	Brahma Vishnu Maheshwara	✗	✗	✓	Kannada	
1986	Karna	✗	✗	✓	Kannada	Remake of Saaheb
1986	Krishna Nee Begane Baro	✗	✗	✓	Kannada	Remake of Souten
1986	Maneye Manthralaya	✗	✗	✓	Kannada	Remake of Ghar Dhwar
1987	Kurukshetra	✗	✗	✓	Kannada	
1987	Thene Manasulu	✓	✓	✗	Telugu	Remake of Souten
1989	Yuga Purusha	✗	✗	✓	Kannada	Remake of Karz
1990	Bannada Gejje	✓	✓	✗	Kannada	
1990	Prema Yuddham	✓	✓	✗	Telugu	
1990	Muthina Haara	✓	✓	✓	Kannada	
1990	Sri Satyanarayana Poojaphala	✗	✗	✓	Kannada	
1992	Mallige Hoove	✗	✗	✓	Kannada	
1993	Hoovu Hannu	✓	✓	✓	Kannada	Based on Triveni's novel
1994	Mahakshathriya	✓	✓	✗	Kannada	
1995	Himapatha	✓	✓	✗	Kannada	Based on T K Rama Rao's novel
1995	Kalyanothsava	✓	✓	✗	Kannada	
1997	Mungarina Minchu	✓	✓	✓	Kannada	
1998	Doni Saagali	✓	✓	✗	Kannada	Based on C.N Muktha's novel Vimukte
1998	Bhoomi Thayiya Chochchala Maga	✓	✓	✓	Kannada	
1999	Mechanic Mavayya	✓	✓	✓	Telugu	
2001	Kurigalu Saar Kurigalu	✓	✓	✓	Kannada	
2002	Kothigalu Saar Kothigalu	✓	✓	✓	Kannada	
2003	Katthegalu Saar Katthegalu	✓	✓	✓	Kannada	
2004	Love	✓	✓	✓	Kannada	
2004	Kanchana Ganga	✓	✓	✗	Kannada	
2006	Mohini 9886788888	✓	✓	✓	Kannada	
2008	Buddhivantha	✗	✗	✓	Kannada	
2010	Thipparalli Tharlegalu	✓	✓	✗	Kannada	
2015	Rebel	✓	✓	✗	Kannada	
2026	Raktha Kashmira	✓	✓	✗	Kannada	
2026	Veera Kambula	✓	✓	✗	Kannada; Tulu	

== Awards ==
=== National Film Awards ===
Year	Movie	Award	Refs.
1984 (32nd)	Bandhana	Best Feature Film in Kannada	
1990 (38th)	Muthina Haara	Best Feature Film in Kannada	
1997 (45th)	Mungarina Minchu	Best Feature Film in Kannada	

=== Karnataka State Film Awards ===
Year	Movie	Award	Refs.
1981–82	Antha	Best Screenplay	
1990–91	Muthina Haara	Best Film (First)	
1993–94	Hoovu Hannu	Special Jury Award	
1996–97		Puttanna Kanagal Award	
1998–99	Doni Saagali	Best Film (Third)	
1998–99	Bhoomi Thayiya Chochchala Maga	Best Social Concern Film	
1998–99	Bhoomi Thayiya Chochchala Maga	Best Story Writer	
2000–01	Kurigalu Saar Kurigalu	Best Film (Third)	
2001–02	Kothigalu Saar Kothigalu	Best Screenplay	

=== Filmfare Awards (South) ===
Year	Movie	Award	Refs.
1993	Hoovu Hannu	Best Director – Kannada	
1994	Mahakshathriya	Best Director – Kannada	
2001	Kothigalu Saar Kothigalu	Best Film – Kannada	

== Books ==
Rajendra Singh Babu wrote the book Nenanpina Muthina Hara in memory of the Kannada actor Vishnuvardhan. The book is a tribute to Vishnuvardhan, where Babu shares his numerous experiences with Vishnuvardhan, and describes Babu's drive to work on meaningful cinema.

== Organizations /committees ==
Committees	Role
Karnataka Film Director's Association (6 times)	President
Karnataka Film and T.V. Technicians	President
Karnataka Film Chamber of Commerce (2 times)	Executive-Committee
International Film Festival of India, 1992, Bangalore	Nominated member by State Govt.
Karnataka Chalanachitra Academy	President
52nd International Film Festival of India, 2021, Goa	Feature film jury, Chairperson
