= Aditya (actor) =

Indian actor

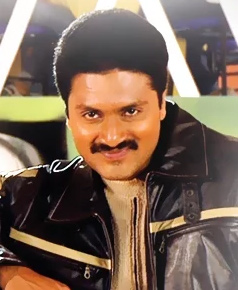
- Aditya on the sets of 2007 film, Snehana Preethina
- Born: Aditya Singh; Bangalore, Karnataka, India
- Occupation: Actor
- Years active: 2004–present
- Parent(s): Rajendra Singh Babu; Anuradha Singh
- Relatives: Rishika Singh (sister); D. Shankar Singh (grandfather); Vijayalakshmi Singh (aunt); Jai Jagadish (uncle)

Aditya is an Indian film producer and actor, primarily appearing in Kannada films. He made his acting debut in 2004, starring in Love and went on to appear in several commercially successful films for a period. He is the son of director Rajendra Singh Babu.

== Career ==
Aditya's career began at the age of 21, when he began producing many of the films directed by his father. He joined the acting course at Kishore Namith Kapoor Acting School and there he trained to act in films. Soon after this, he started acting in films. His debut was with the 2004-released film Love in which he co-starred Rakshita and Amrish Puri with Mohanlal in a cameo appearance, directed by his father and with music composed by Bollywood composer Anu Malik. The much hyped film failed at the box office. After his Kannada debut, he acted in the Hindi remake of the Kannada movie A. K. 47, with the same title.

It was the 2005 released Deadly Soma that gained Aditya fame. He played the lead protagonist in the film and earned critical acclaim.

== Filmography ==
Year	Film title	Role	Notes
2004	Love	Vikram (Vicky)	
2004	AK-47	Rudra Pratap	Hindi film; credited as Aditya Singh
2005	Aadi	Aadi	
2005	Deadly Soma	Somashekara	
2006	Ambi	Ambi	
2006	Mohini 9886788888	Varun	
2006	Madana	Madana/Putta	Dual roles
2007	Arasu	Vinay	Guest appearance
2007	Kshana Kshana	Samarth	
2007	Snehana Preethina	Adhi	
2010	Deadly-2	Soma	
2012	Shikari	Dream Seller	Cameo appearance
2012	Villain	Tippu	
2012	Edegarike	Sona	Nominated – Filmfare Award for Best Actor – Kannada
2013	Sweety Nanna Jodi	Siddharth	
2013	Bhajarangi	Himself	Special appearance
2015	Rebel	Karthik	
2015	Vaalu	Anbu	Tamil film
2017	Bangalore Underworld	Ram/Maalik	
2017	Chakravarthy	ACP Suryakanth	
2021	Munduvareda Adhyaya	ACP Bala	
2024	5D		
2024	Kangaroo	ACP Prithvi	
2025	Ekka	ACP Durga Prasad	
2026	Raktha Kashmira	Himself	Special appearance in the song "Star Star"
2026	Veera Kambala	Sathya	Simultaneously shot in Tulu
2026	Terror	Vijay Aditya Roy	
