= Mayuri Kyatari =

Indian actress and model

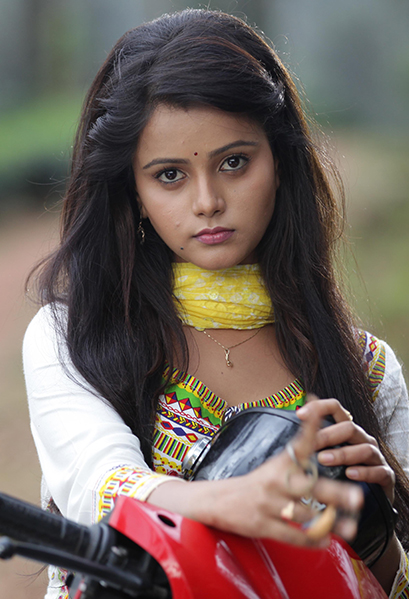
- Kyatari in 2018
- Born: 5 March 1992 (age 34); Dharwad, Karnataka, India
- Other name: Mayuri Kyatari
- Years active: 2015–present
- Spouse: Arun Raju (m. 2020)
- Children: 1

Mayuri Kyatari (born 5 March 1992) is an Indian actress and model. Kyatari began her career in the Kannada serial Ashwini Nakshatra, which made her famous. She debuted in the Kannada movie Krishna Leela. Featuring in Ishtakamya, Nataraja Service and Rustum.

== Early life ==
Mayuri Kyatari was born to Geetha and Prakash Kyatari in Hubli, Karnataka, and was brought up there. After doing her schooling in Hubli St Michaels, she completed her Pre-university at Fathima College in Hubli. She graduated in commerce from Oxford college Hubli. She was also an anchor for four years during her career in the industry. She was first seen in the Kannada serial Ashwini Nakshatra, where she played role of Ashwini, wife of a superstar.

In 2015, Kyatari entered the Kannada film industry. She first signed for the Kannada Drama film Krishna Leela. The movie was successfully completed in 100 days and gave her fame enough to be cast for Nagathihalli Chandrashekhar's next film Ishtakamya, opposite to Vijay Suriya. She has worked with Sharan in a movie called Nataraja Service under Puneeth Rajkumar presentation, which has been released.

== Filmography ==
=== Films ===
Year	Film	Role(s)	Notes	Ref.
2015	Krishna Leela	Leela	Nominated—IIFA Utsavam Award for Best Performance in a Leading Role – Female; Nominated—Filmfare Award for Best Actress – Kannada	
2016	Ishtakamya	Acchari		
2016	Nataraja Service	Sahana		
2017	Kariya 2	Janaki		
2018	Raambo 2	Herself	Special Appearance	
2018	Johnny Johnny Yes Papa	Angel	Cameo appearance	
2018	8MM Bullet	Smitha		
2019	Rustum	Ammu		
2019	Nanna Prakara	Vismaya		
2019	Aatakuntu Lekakilla	Meghana		
2020	Mounam	Mayuri		
2021	Pogaru	Shiva's Sister		
2022	Wheelchair Romeo	Dimple		

=== Dubbing artist ===
Year	Film	Actor	Role	Note
2019	Kiss	Sreeleela	Nandini	

=== Television ===
Year	Title	Role	Network	Notes
2015	Ashwini Nakshatra	Ashwini	Colors Kannada	
2019	Nammane Yuvarani		Colors Kannada	Cameo appearance
2024	Nanna Devru	Mayuri	Colors Kannada	
2026	Raakshasa	Jyothi	ZEE5	

== Personal life ==
Mayuri married her long-time boyfriend, Arun, on 12 June 2020 at Sri Thirumalagiri Sri Lakshmi Venkateswara Swami Temple in Bengaluru.
