= Stella Voskovetskaya =

Russian ballet dancer

- Born: Stella Semenovna Voskovetskaya; 6 February 1965 (age 61); Kiev, Ukrainian SSR
- Education: Kiev Ballet School, [Kyiv State Choreographic Academy]
- Website: www.stellavoskovetskaya.com

Stella Voskovetskaya is a dancer, choreographer and dance instructor.

== Biography ==
Voskovetskaya was born on February 6, 1965, in Kyiv Ukraine. In 1971, Voskovetskaya was accepted at the Kyiv Ballet School (teachers Lyudmila Krymskaya and Galina Kirilova). Four years later she was accepted at Kyiv State Choreographic Academy, where she graduated in 1983. She was later admitted to the Corps de Ballet of the Kiyv State Academic Opera and Ballet Theatre where she worked from 1983 to 2000.

In 1984 Stella was promoted to coryphée. Afterward, over the course of several years, she steadily progressed through the ranks at the Kyiv State Academic Opera and Ballet Theatre, first as a demi-soloist and later as a soloist.

After retiring in 2000, Voskovetskaya returned to Kyiv, where she founded Academic Children's Dance Ensemble. In 2004, she moved to the US, where she helped found Voronov Academy of Ballet in Chicago. In 2010, she began working with several ballet schools in Chicago, preparing students for prestigious international ballet competitions. In 2012, Voskovetskaya opened her own school, and after the reorganization in 2016, continues to work at the school preparing students for professional careers in ballet.

Currently Mrs. Voskovetskaya is a founder and Artistic Director of Illinois Classical Ballet.

== Repertoire ==
- Swan Lake
- The Nutcracker
- Giselle
- Don Quixote
- Raymonda
- La Bayadère
- Romeo and Juliet
- The Fountain of Bakhchisarai

== Member of ==
- The International Dance Council
- Dance USA
- National Dance Education Organization
