= Sunny Moza =

Indian actor and television show host

- Born: Jammu, Jammu and Kashmir, India
- Occupation(s): Actor, MC, TV host, radio jockey, stand-up
- Years active: 2004-present
- Relatives: Kunal Khemu (second cousin)
- Website: www.sunnymoza.com

Sunny Moza is an Indian actor who made his debut with the TV series Bhabhi (2004) and Kyunki Saas Bhi Kabhi Bahu Thi (2004). He is known for his performance as the lead actor in the Bollywood music video "Ab Laut Aa" (2013) and as the TV host in the reality show Dance USA Dance (2017). His notable roles as an actor include the films Kurse (2008), According to Plan A (2012), Yellow (2015), Babru (2019) and Songs of Silence (2020).

== Early life ==
Sunny Moza was born and raised in Jammu, Jammu and Kashmir, India in a Kashmiri Pandit family. His second cousin, Kunal Khemu, is a Bollywood actor.

Sunny completed his master's degree in computer engineering at San Jose State University. While studying, he also took film and acting classes at local colleges in California.

== Career ==
Sunny Moza made his debut as an actor appearing in the StarPlus TV series Bhabhi (2004) and Kyunki Saas Bhi Kabhi Bahu Thi (2004). He made his film debut with Kurse (2008) which he also wrote, directed and produced. His film received the Audience Choice Award at the Northern California Film Festival.

Sunny later appeared alongside Ali Fazal in the 2012 film According to Plan A in which he played a supporting role. The film received the "Best of the Fest" Award at the Riverside International Film Festival. The following year, he played the male lead in the Bollywood music video "Ab Laut Aa" (2013) which was produced by Sanjoy and featured Sunidhi Chauhan. The music video was well-received with more than a million views within weeks of its release.

In 2015, Sunny starred in the silent thriller Yellow on NDTV Prime. A few years later, in 2017, he performed onstage in the award-winning play Ideation written by Aaron Loeb in which he later reappeared in 2019. He also hosted season 1 of the reality TV show Dance USA Dance with Saroj Khan on Zee TV in 2017.

In addition to acting and hosting, Sunny anchors radio shows on Radio Zindagi and performs stand-up comedy at various events. In 2018, he became known in the Indian stand-up comedy circuit when he shared the stage with Indian comedians like Zakir Khan. He also gained attention in Kannada cinema in 2019 for his role as Fedrico in the film Babru with Suman Nagarkar.

Most recently, Sunny made his entry in Punjabi cinema with the film Songs of Silence directed by Sukhwant Dhadda on PTC Punjabi in 2020. Currently, he is working on releasing his film Kaaya.

== Awards ==
Sunny Moza won the Director's Award at the San Francisco India Pageant. His film, Kurse, received the Audience Choice Award at the Northern California Film Festival in 2008. He also received the Best Event Anchor Award at BASAFF.

== Theater/Filmography ==
| Year | Title | Role | Medium | Notes |
|---|---|---|---|---|
| 2020 | Songs of Silence | Roshan Pannu | Film | Directed by Sukhwant Dhadda on PTC Punjabi |
| 2019 | Babru | Fedrico | Film | Co-Actor: Suman Nagarkar |
| 2019 | Ideation | Lead Actor | Theater | Written by Aaron Loeb |
| 2017 | Dance USA Dance | MC/TV Host | TV | Judged by Saroj Khan on Zee TV |
| 2017 | Ideation | Lead Actor | Theater | Written by Aaron Loeb |
| 2015 | Yellow | Lead Actor | Film | Released on NDTV Prime |
| 2013 | "Ab Laut Aa" | Attacker | Music Video | Producer: Sanjoy Singer: Sunidhi Chauhan Music: Gaurav Dagaonkar Lyricist: Niranjan Iyengar |
| 2012 | According to Plan A | Raghu | Film | Co-Actor: Ali Fazal |
| 2008 | Kurse | Sahil | Film | Written, Directed and Produced by Sunny Moza |
| 2004 | Kyunki Saas Bhi Kabhi Bahu Thi | Sunny | TV | Produced by Ekta Kapoor/Balaji Telefilms on StarPlus |
| 2004 | Bhabhi | Rahul | TV | Produced by Ronnie Screwvala/UTV on StarPlus |
