= Filmfare Award for Best Male Debut – South =

Indian film award

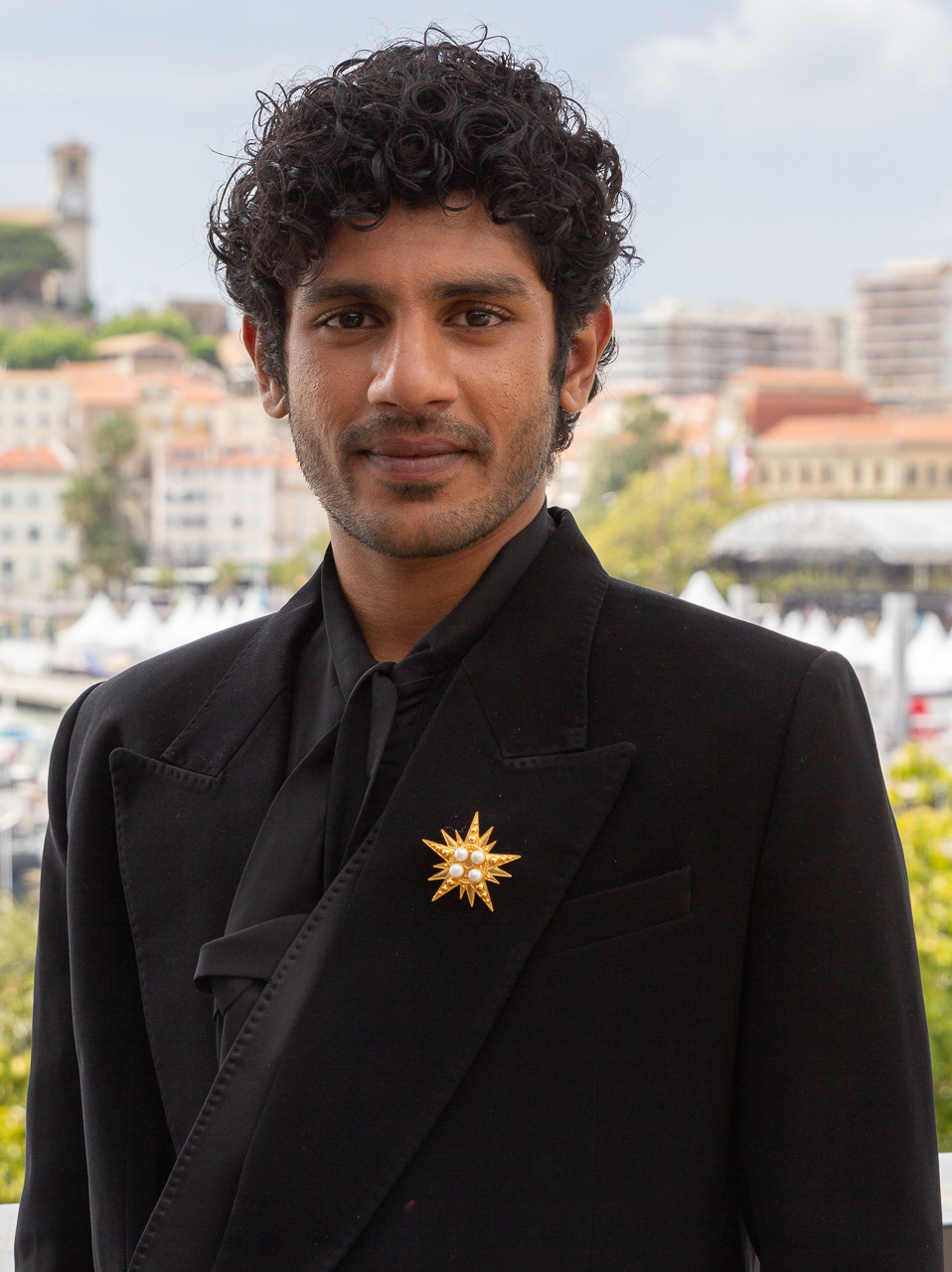
- One of the 2024 recipients: Hridhu Haroon
- Awarded for: Best Debut Performance by an Actor
- Country: India
- Presented by: Filmfare
- First award: R. Madhavan for Alai Payuthey (2000)
- Currently held by: Sandeep Saroj for Committee Kurrollu; Hridhu Haroon for Thugs; Abhimanyu Thilakan for Marco; K. R. Gokul for Aadujeevitham; Samarjit Lankesh for Gowri; (2024)

Highlights
- Most wins: Dulquer Salmaan (2)

The Filmfare Award for Best Male Debut is given by the Filmfare magazine as part of its annual Filmfare Awards South for South Indian films.

== Superlatives ==
Dulquer Salmaan remains the only actor who has won the award twice. He won the award for two languages, 2012 for his Malayalam debut and 2014 for his Tamil debut.

=== Wins by Language ===
- Tamil – 13
- Telugu – 12
- Malayalam – 5
- Kannada – 2

== Recipients ==
Year	Actor	Film	Language(s)	Ref.
2000	R. Madhavan	Alai Payuthey	Tamil	
2001	Not Awarded			
2002	Nithiin	Jayam	Telugu	
2003	Vishnu Manchu	Vishnu	Telugu	
2004	Ravi Krishna	7G Rainbow Colony	Tamil	
2005	Arya	Arinthum Ariyamalum	Tamil	
2006	Ram Pothineni	Devadasu	Telugu	
2007	Ram Charan	Chirutha	Telugu	
2008	Shanthanu Bhagyaraj	Sakkarakatti	Tamil	
2009	Naga Chaitanya	Josh	Telugu	
2010	Rana Daggubati	Leader	Telugu	
2011	Aadi Saikumar	Prema Kavali	Telugu	
2012	Dulquer Salmaan	Second Show	Malayalam	
2012	Udhayanidhi Stalin	Oru Kal Oru Kannadi	Tamil	
2013	Nivin Pauly	Neram	Tamil	
2013	Gautham Karthik	Kadal	Tamil	
2014	Dulquer Salmaan	Vaayai Moodi Pesavum	Tamil	
2014	Bellamkonda Sai Sreenivas	Alludu Seenu	Telugu	
2015	Akhil Akkineni	Akhil	Telugu	
2015	G. V. Prakash Kumar	Darling	Tamil	
2016	Shirish	Metro	Tamil	
2017	Vasanth Ravi	Taramani	Tamil	
2017	Antony Varghese	Angamaly Diaries	Malayalam	
2018	Not Awarded			
2019	AWARDS FUNCTION WAS SUSPENDED DUE TO COVID-19 PANDEMIC			
2020–21	Panja Vaisshnav Tej	Uppena	Telugu	
2020–21	Dev Mohan	Sufiyum Sujatayum	Malayalam	
2022	Pradeep Ranganathan	Love Today	Tamil	
2023	Sangeeth Sobhan	Mad	Telugu	
2023	Shishir Baikady	Daredevil Musthafa	Kannada	
2024	Sandeep Saroj	Committee Kurrollu	Telugu	
2024	Hridhu Haroon	Thugs	Tamil	
2024	Abhimanyu Shammy Thilakan	Marco	Malayalam	
2024	K. R. Gokul	Aadujeevitham	Malayalam	
2024	Samarjit Lankesh	Gowri	Kannada	
