= Nagathihalli =

Nagathihalli Nagathihalli
- village
- Country: India
- State: Karnataka
- District: Mandya

Government
  - Type: Panchayat raj
  - Body: Gram panchayat

Population
  - Total: 1,500

Languages
  - Official: Kannada
- Time zone: UTC+5:30 (IST)
- PIN: 571418
- Telephone code: 08234
- ISO 3166 code: IN-KA
- Vehicle registration: KA
- Nearest city: Nagamangala
- Lok Sabha constituency: Mandya
- Vidhan Sabha constituency: Nagamangala
- Website: karnataka.gov.in

Nagathihalli is a village in Indian state of Karnataka. The village is in Mandya district of southern Karnataka. It is located along NH 48, 115 km from Bangalore, the capital of Karnataka State.

== Notable people from Nagathihalli ==
- Nagathihalli Chandrashekhar
