= Hema Prabhath =

Indian film actress

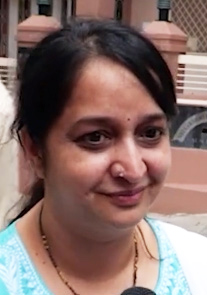
- Hema Prabhath in 2024
- Born: Hema; Karnataka, India
- Other name: Hema Panchamukhi
- Occupations: Actress, dancer (Bharatanatyam)
- Spouses: Sumendra Panchamukhi (divorced) Prashanth G Shastry (m. 2017)
- Children: 2

Hema Prabhath, also known professionally as Hema Panchamukhi, is an Indian actress known for her work in Kannada cinema.

== Cine Career ==
Hema started a Child Actor in Prabhat_Kalavidarutroupe. She became famous, when she portrayed as Goddess Sarawati in Nadamaya song of Rajkumar's Jeevana_Chaitra movie. She later acted in Devaraj's Golibar. She started as Lead Actor in Shivarajkumar's Dore (1995), movie. She became popular with Nagathihalli_Chandrashekhar's America!_America!!. She played Ravichandran_(Kannada_actor)'s sister in Ravimama.

Hema teaches dance to students in theater group, Prabhath Kalavidaru. She has her own dance academy known as Sukrutees which is almost 20 years old. She has over 100 students who learn dance under her.

She made a comeback in the industry through the series Raksha Bandhana aired on colours in 2019.

== Personal life ==
Hema's brother is actor Harish Prabhath. She is married to Prashanth G Shastry since 2017 and the couple are the parents of a daughter born in 2018 Hema was earlier married to Sumindra Panchamukhi and settled in New Delhi. The couple had one daughter. After filing for divorce Hema returned to Bangalore, changed her surname back to Prabhath and started a dance school.

== Filmography ==
| Year | Title | Role | Note(s) | Ref. |
|---|---|---|---|---|
| 1992 | Jeevana Chaitra | Saraswathi | | |
| 1993 | Golibar | | | |
| 1994 | Vijaya Kankana | | | |
| 1995 | Dore | | | |
| 1996 | Bangarada Mane | | | |
| 1997 | America America | Bhoomika | | |
| 1999 | Sambhrama | | | |
| 1999 | Ravimama | | | |

== See also ==
- List of people from Karnataka
- Cinema of Karnataka
- List of Indian film actresses
