= America America 2 =

2026 Kannada-language romantic drama film

- Directed by: Nagathihalli Chandrashekhar
- Screenplay by: Nagathihalli Chandrashekhar
- Based on: Kshame by Sahana Vijayakumar
- Starring: Nirup Bhandari; Shanvi Srivastava; Pruthvi Ambaar
- Cinematography: S. K. Rao
- Edited by: Sri Crazy Mindz
- Music by: Mano Murthy; Nakul Abhyankar
- Production company: Nagathihalli Cine Creations
- Distributed by: KVN Productions
- Release date: 11 September 2026
- Running time: 142 minutes
- Country: India
- Language: Kannada

America America 2 is a 2026 Indian Kannada-language romantic drama film directed by Nagathihalli Chandrashekhar. The film stars Nirup Bhandari, Shanvi Srivastava and Pruthvi Ambaar in the lead roles. It is based on Sahana Vijayakumar's novel Kshame and is not a direct continuation of the characters from Chandrashekhar's 1997 film America America.

== Plot ==
The story centers on Nudi (Shanvi Srivastava), a successful AI engineer in India who is married to Ninad (Nirup Bhandari), with whom she has a young daughter (played by Ritu Singh). Despite having a family, Nudi's marriage has grown emotionally strained and weighed down by years of unspoken compromises and silences.

Much of Nudi's outlook on life and relationships is shaped by deep-seated childhood trauma. Growing up, her family fractured under the weight of her father's (Mandya Ramesh) suspected infidelity, which ultimately drove her mother (Manasi Sudhir) to die by suicide. Resenting their father, Nudi's brother cut ties and relocated to Canada. Although he urged Nudi to join him abroad, she stayed behind in India out of a sense of duty to care for her aging father. Seeking stability without emotional vulnerability, she specifically sought out a marriage free of heavy emotional dependency—only to later feel disillusioned and disconnected when Ninad turned out to be a very different person from what she anticipated.

Nudi's routine life takes a sharp turn when she travels to Seattle, USA, on a work assignment. Through a chance encounter, she crosses paths with Neel (Pruthvi Ambaar), her childhood friend and former love. The movie uses the recurring motif of a "lucky penny"—something you don't look for, but that finds you—to frame their sudden reunion as a twist of fate that forces Nudi to make a conscious choice.

As Nudi and Neel spend time together against the backdrop of Seattle, buried feelings resurface. However, their reconnection is far from a carefree romance. They find themselves confronting why their past relationship ended—acknowledging that love isn't always defeated by a lack of feeling, but by timing, circumstance, and the survival choices people make when they are young.

As Nudi travels between the US and India, the boundaries between her past and present begin to blur. Neel gifts a dreamcatcher for Nudi to pass on to her daughter, who has been suffering from nightmares triggered by Nudi's frequent absences to America. Back home, the unspoken tension reaches a boiling point when her innocent daughter spots Neel in an old photograph alongside her mother, bringing buried truths to the surface.

In the second half, the narrative pulls Ninad into the emotional storm as Nudi and Ninad travel to the US, leaving Nudi caught directly between the man who represents her unfinished past and the husband who represents her present responsibilities. Rather than playing out as a conventional, melodramatic love triangle, the climax focuses on the theme of Kshame (forgiveness) and the reality that marriage requires continuous work. Realizing that revisiting the past complicates the present rather than healing it, Nudi is forced to confront her own guilt and emotional indecisiveness. Ultimately, she steps back from the illusion of a second-chance romance with Neel, choosing to accept the weight of her past decisions and return to her marriage and family, leaving viewers with an open-ended reflection on whether love and forgiveness can truly survive the compromises of adulthood.

== Cast ==
- Nirup Bhandari as Ninad
- Shanvi Srivastava as Nudi
- Pruthvi Ambaar as Neel
- Achyuth Kumar
- Mandya Ramesh
- Manasi Sudhir
- Ritu Singh

== Production ==
The film was produced by Nagathihalli Chandrashekhar under the Nagathihalli Cine Creations banner. The film was shot in Seattle, United States. S. K. Rao served as the cinematographer and Sri Crazy Mindz as the editor and drone photograper.

The film is based on Sahana Vijayakumar's novel Kshame. Chandrashekhar said that the film is not a continuation of the characters from America America (1997), but a different story centred on relationships and human emotions.

== Music ==
America America 2

Soundtrack album by Mano Murthy
- Released: 2026
- Recorded: 2025
- Genre: Feature film soundtrack
- Language: Kannada
- Producer: Mano Murthy

The music was composed by Mano Murthy, with background music by Nakul Abhyankar. Murthy and Chandrashekhar had previously worked together on the 1997 film America America and reunited for this film.

The first single, "Run Run", was released in August 2026. It was composed by Mano Murthy and featured vocals by Shankar Mahadevan and Shreya Ghoshal.

Track listing
No.	Title	Lyrics	Singer(s)	Length
1.	"Run Run"	Nagathihalli Chandrashekar	Shankar Mahadevan, Shreya Ghoshal	4:39
2.	"Ee Dhareya Mele"	Nagathihalli Chandrashekar	Rajesh Krishnan, Shreya Ghoshal	3:23
3.	"Kitakiyalli Chandira"	Savitha Nagabhushan	Shreya Ghoshal	3:04
4.	"Rama Rama"	Sri Gajanana Sharma	Khushala, Manasa, Dakshayani, Shashi, Shilpa	4:02
Total length:				15:02

== Release ==
America America 2 was released theatrically in India on 11 September 2026.

The film received a Central Board of Film Certification certificate from its Bengaluru regional office on 20 May 2026. It was certified UA 16+ with a certified length of 142.38 metres.

== Reception ==
The Times of India rated the film 3 out of 5. The review praised its treatment of relationships and the performances, while noting slow pacing in parts of the second half.

Cinema Express also rated the film 3 out of 5. The review praised the performances, cinematography and music, and discussed the film's treatment of love, marriage and personal choices. It also found some of the emotional developments underdeveloped.
