= Wheelchair Romeo =

2022 Indian film

- Theatrical release poster
- Directed by: Nataraj G.
- Produced by: Thimmappa Venkatachalaiah
- Starring: Ram Chethan; Mayuri Kyatari
- Cinematography: Santhosh Pandit
- Music by: Bharath B. J.
- Production company: Agasthya Creation
- Release date: 27 May 2022
- Country: India
- Language: Kannada

Wheelchair Romeo is a 2022 Indian Kannada language comedy film directed by Nataraj G. The film stars Ram Chethan and Mayuri Kyatari. The music was composed by Bharath B. J. The film was released on 27 May 2022.

== Cast ==
- Ram Chethan as Ullas
- Mayuri Kyatari as Dimple
- Rangayana Raghu as Jack
- Suchendra Prasad as Prasad
- Girish Shivanna as Giri
- Tabla Nani as Autoshankar

== Reception ==
A critic from The New Indian Express wrote that "Wheelchair Romeo has an unusual and sensitive subject at its centre and it’s topped with humour. The film is best-watched with an open mind". A critic from The Times of India rated the film three out of five stars and wrote that "Wheelchair Romeo showed promise of a different film that could have had a different take, but it ends up falling prey to the commercial necessities".
