= Hoomale =

- VCD cover
- Directed by: Nagathihalli Chandrashekhar
- Written by: Ramesh Aravind
- Produced by: K. S. Usha Rao
- Starring: Ramesh Aravind; Suman Nagarkar
- Cinematography: G. S. Bhaskar
- Edited by: B. S. Kemparaj
- Music by: Ilayaraja
- Distributed by: Parivarthana
- Release date: 25 May 1998
- Running time: 145 minutes
- Country: India
- Language: Kannada

Hoomale (transl. Flower shower) is a 1998 Indian Kannada language film directed by Nagathihalli Chandrashekhar and written by Ramesh Aravind. The film, besides Ramesh, stars Suman Nagarkar, H. G. Dattatreya, Sorat Ashwath, Bhagirathi Bai, and B. V. Radha in prominent roles.

Produced by K. S. Usha Rao, under the banner Mythri syndicate for the benefit of Parivarthana trust promoting widow marriages the trustees being Nadahalli Sripada Rao and N.B. Jayaprakash, the film was highly appraised by critics upon release and went on to win many awards and accolades including the much coveted National Film Award for Best Feature Film in Kannada. Actor Ramesh won in the Best Actor category at the Karnataka State Film Awards and Filmfare Awards South.

The movie was shot in Assam and Bengaluru.

== Plot ==
It is a love story in the backdrop of terrorism set in Assam.

== Cast ==
- Ramesh Aravind as Santosh
- Suman Nagarkar as Subhashini
- H. G. Somashekar Rao as Santosh's father
- B. V. Radha as Santosh's mother
- H. G. Dattatreya as Santosh's uncle
- Sorat Ashwath as Santosh's grandfather
- Renukamma Murgod as Santosh's grandmother
- Nanjundaiah
- B. V. Rajaram
- Yamuna Murthy
- Mandya Ramesh
- Nagesh
- Vanishree as Santosh's cousin
- Sandhya
- Sunetra Pandit as Bangaramma
- Hema
- Bhavana
- N. B. Jayaprakash as Boss
- Hima (credited as Baby Hima) as Sonali
- Nagathihalli Chandrashekhar in a cameo
- Vinaya Prasad as Vinaya
- Justice M. Nagaprasanna

== Soundtrack ==
The music of the movie is composed by Ilayaraja. Audio on Manoranjan Audio

No.	Title	Lyrics	Singers	Length
1.	"Hoomale Hoomale"	Nagathihalli Chandrashekar	Rajkumar
2.	"Preethiya Gellalu"	K. Kalyan	Ilayaraja, Nagathihalli Chandrashekar
3.	"Jhum Jhum Jhenkarava"	K. Kalyan	SPB Charan, Manjula Gururaj
4.	"O Mahaniyare"	K. Kalyan	SPB Charan, Manjula Gururaj, Raju Ananthaswamy
5.	"Hennigondu Gandu Beku"	K. Kalyan	SPB Charan, Chandrika Gururaj, B. Jayashree, Manjula Gururaj, Raju Ananthaswamy, Nagathihalli Chandrashekar
6.	"Nanna Muddu Rambe"	K. Kalyan	Ramesh Chandra

== Awards ==
Award	Year of ceremony	Category	Recipient(s) and nominee(s)	Result	Ref(s)
National Film Awards	1998	Best Kannada Film	Nagathihalli Chandrashekar	Won	
Karnataka State Film Awards	1998–99	Second Best Film	Nagathihalli Chandrashekar	Won	
Karnataka State Film Awards	1998–99	Best Actor	Ramesh Aravind	Won	
Filmfare Awards South	1999	Best Actor	Ramesh Aravind	Won	
