= Nataraja Service =

- Directed by: Pawan Wadeyar
- Screenplay by: Pawan Wadeyar
- Story by: Pawan Wadeyar
- Produced by: N. S. Rajkumar
- Starring: Sharan; Mayuri Kyatari
- Cinematography: Arul K. Somasundaram
- Edited by: Suresh Arumugam
- Music by: Anoop Seelin
- Production company: Omkar Movies
- Release date: 17 November 2016
- Running time: 145 minutes
- Country: India
- Language: Kannada

Nataraja Service is a 2016 Indian Kannada language romantic action comedy film directed by Pavan Wadeyar, produced by N.S. Rajkumar and presented by Puneeth Rajkumar. It stars Sharan and Mayuri Kyatari. The music was composed by Anoop Seelin whilst the cinematography was by Arul K. Somasundaram.

== Cast ==
- Sharan as Nataraja
- Mayuri Kyatari as Sahana
- Rockline Venkatesh as Inspector Venkatesh
- Apoorva
- Silli Lalli Anand
- Yathiraj
- Nagaraj Murthy
- P. Ravi Shankar in a special appearance in the song "Allah Allah Nataraja Bartonella"

== Production ==
Principal photography for the film began in October 2015. The shooting was held at Bangalore, Mysore, Shimoga, Davanagere, Mandya, Dandeli and Sirsi locations and was completed in early June 2016. After several announcements, the film was finally released on 17 November 2016.

== Soundtrack ==
Nataraja Service

Soundtrack album by Anoop Seelin
- Released: 29 Jul 2016
- Genre: Feature film soundtrack
- Length: 14:19
- Language: Kannada
- Label: JP Music

Anoop Seelin composed the film's background score and soundtrack. An opening song of the film is sung by Puneeth Rajkumar and penned by Pavan Wadeyar. According to Wadeyar, the song speaks about the "benefits of walking" and has a philosophical message as the theme. The audio was released on 28 July 2016.

Track listing
| No. | Title | Lyrics | Singer(s) | Length |
|---|---|---|---|---|
| 1. | "Allah Allah" | Pawan Wadeyar | Anoop Seelin | 3:16 |
| 2. | "Nataraja Service" | Pawan Wadeyar | Puneeth Rajkumar | 3:47 |
| 3. | "Kattale Tumbida" | Arasu Anthare | Apoorva Sridhar | 3:59 |
| 4. | "Latte Latte" | Pawan Wadeyar | Anoop Seelin | 3:17 |
| Total length: | | | | 14:19 |
