= Babru =

First Kannada movie to be made completely in US

- Directed by: Sujay Ramaiah
- Screenplay by: Sujay Ramaiah; Varun Shastry; Lokesh BS; Harish Sathish; Suhas Malpe
- Story by: Sujay Ramaiah
- Produced by: Gurudev Nagaraja; Siya Sharva; Ramakrishna Jujaray; Saleela Nandeesh Murthy; Arjun Chadrappa; Nitin Jagtap; Hemaprabhu Jayanna; Ravindra HN; Yogesh Puttarangachar
- Starring: Suman Nagarkar; Mahi Hiremath; Sunny Moza
- Cinematography: Sujay Ramaiah; Sumukha
- Edited by: Bindu Madhava
- Music by: Poornachandra Tejaswi
- Production companies: Suman Nagarkar Productions; Yuga Creations
- Distributed by: KRG Studio (Karnataka); Kasturi Media (overseas); Radical Frames
- Release date: 6 December 2019
- Country: India
- Language: Kannada

Babru is an Indian Kannada language film, directed by Sujay Ramaiah. Poornachandra Tejaswi has composed music for the film. It stars Suman Nagarkar, Mahi Hiremath, Sunny Moza, Ray Tostado and Prakruthi Kashyap in lead roles. It is jointly produced by Suman Nagarkar Productions and Yuga Creations. It is the first Kannada movie to be made completely in the United States. and is also a comeback movie for Suman Nagarkar in a lead role. It was released on 6 December 2019

== Plot ==
The movie revolves around two strangers, Arjun and Sana, who meet at a car rental and bond over their common language, Kannada. Circumstances lead to them sharing a car, and what follows is a road trip filled with unexpected events.

== Cast ==
- Suman Nagarkar as Sana/Srishti
- Mahi Hiremath as Arjun
- Sunny Moza as Fedrico
- Ray Tostado as Gustavo
- Prakruthi Kashyap as Maya and Diya
- Lauren Spartano as Valerie
- Gaana Bhat as Carla
- Sandeep Belliyappa as Gacha
- Suresh Bhat as Don Marco
- Bharat Shripad as Hari

== Soundtrack ==
Babru

Soundtrack album by Poornachandra Tejaswi
- Released: 2019
- Recorded: 2019
- Genre: Feature film soundtrack
- Length: 20:14
- Language: Kannada
- Label: PRK Audio
- Producer: Poornachandra Tejaswi

Poornachandra Tejaswi chronology
| Fortuner (2019) | Babru (2019) | Kudi Yedamaithe (2021) |

Five songs in movie and music is composed by Poornachandra Tejaswi. Spanish music composer Carla Veronica Gonzalez composed "Soledad".

Tracklist
| No. | Title | Lyrics | Music | Singer(s) | Length |
|---|---|---|---|---|---|
| 1. | "Kanasella Nanasaago" | Lokesh B.S | Poornachandra Tejaswi | Sanjith Hegde | 3:44 |
| 2. | "Banda Banda Babru" | Chandan Shetty | Poornachandra Tejaswi | Chandan Shetty | 2:48 |
| 3. | "Kaalada Kadalalli" | Dr. K.S Narasimhaswamy | Poornachandra Tejaswi | Aditi Sagar | 3:53 |
| 4. | "Shankaane" | Varun Shastry, Abhijit Mahesh | Poornachandra Tejaswi | Vijay Prakash | 2:58 |
| 5. | "Soledad" | Carla Veronica Gonzalez | Carla Veronica Gonzalez | Carla Veronica Gonzalez | 3:00 |
| 6. | "Kaalada Kadalalli" | Dr. K.S Narasimhaswamy | Poornachandra Tejaswi | Poornachandra Tejaswi | 3:51 |
| Total length: | | | | | 20:14 |

== Reception ==
Most of the reviews of the film speak about its climax, the cinematography and the use of drones videography for showcasing the landscape of the United States.
