= Summer Holidays (2018 film) =

Indian children's film

- Poster
- Directed by: Kavitha Lankesh
- Written by: Kavitha Lankesh
- Produced by: Kavitha Lankesh
- Starring: Esha Lankesh; Samarjit Lankesh; Sonia Hegde; Anish Angre
- Cinematography: AC Mahender
- Edited by: Jo Ni Harsha
- Music by: Songs: Rohit Gandhi; Score: Argenil
- Production company: Esha Lankesh Productions
- Release date: 3 August 2018
- Country: India
- Languages: English; Kannada

Summer Holidays is a 2018 Indian children's film directed by Kavitha Lankesh starring Esha Lankesh, Samarjit Lankesh, Sonia Hegde and Anish Angre with Prakash Raj and Suman Nagarkar in supporting roles. The film was simultaneously shot in English and Kannada.

== Plot ==
Four kids and their dog named Bheema go on a trip to Chikkamagaluru. However, they have an eerie encounter.

== Cast ==
- Esha Lankesh
- Samarjit Lankesh
- Sonia Hegde
- Anish Angre
- Bheema
- Prakash Raj
- Suman Nagarkar
- Gauri Lankesh as an activist
- Siddaramaiah as himself

== Production ==
Since there are many village-based children's films in Kannada, Kavitha Lankesh decided to make an urban children's film in both English and Kannada. Siddaramaiah played a guest role in the film appearing in the forest similar to his real life encounter with Adivasis in the Didalli forest range.

== Themes and influences ==
The film was reported to be similar to Enid Blyton's films.

== Soundtrack ==
English Track listing
No.	Title	Singer(s)	Length
1.	"Lets Go To The Mountains (Female)"	Chaitra H. G.	2:49
2.	"Lets Go To The Mountains (Male)"	Santosh Venky	2:49
3.	"Take Off On A Highway (Female)"	Chaitra H. G.	2:59
4.	"Take Off On A Highway (Male)"	Santosh Venky	2:59
Total length:			11:36

Kannada Track listing
No.	Title	Singer(s)	Length
1.	"Rekke Bidisaaithu Haarooke"	Chaitra H. G.	2:50
2.	"Rekke Bidisaaithu Haarooke"	Santosh Venky	2:50
3.	"Haaru Inu Mele Jeevane"	Vasuki Vaibhav	3:20
4.	"Rasteyalli Haarikondu Naavu"	Santosh Venky	2:59
5.	"Rasteyalli Haarikondu Naavu (Female)"	Chaitra H. G.	3:00
Total length:			12:59

== Release ==
Prior to the film's release, the film was well received in a special screening attended by 500 parents and children. The film was theatrically released on 3 August 2018 at PVR, Vega City Mall in Bengaluru.
