= Samarjit Lankesh =

Indian actor

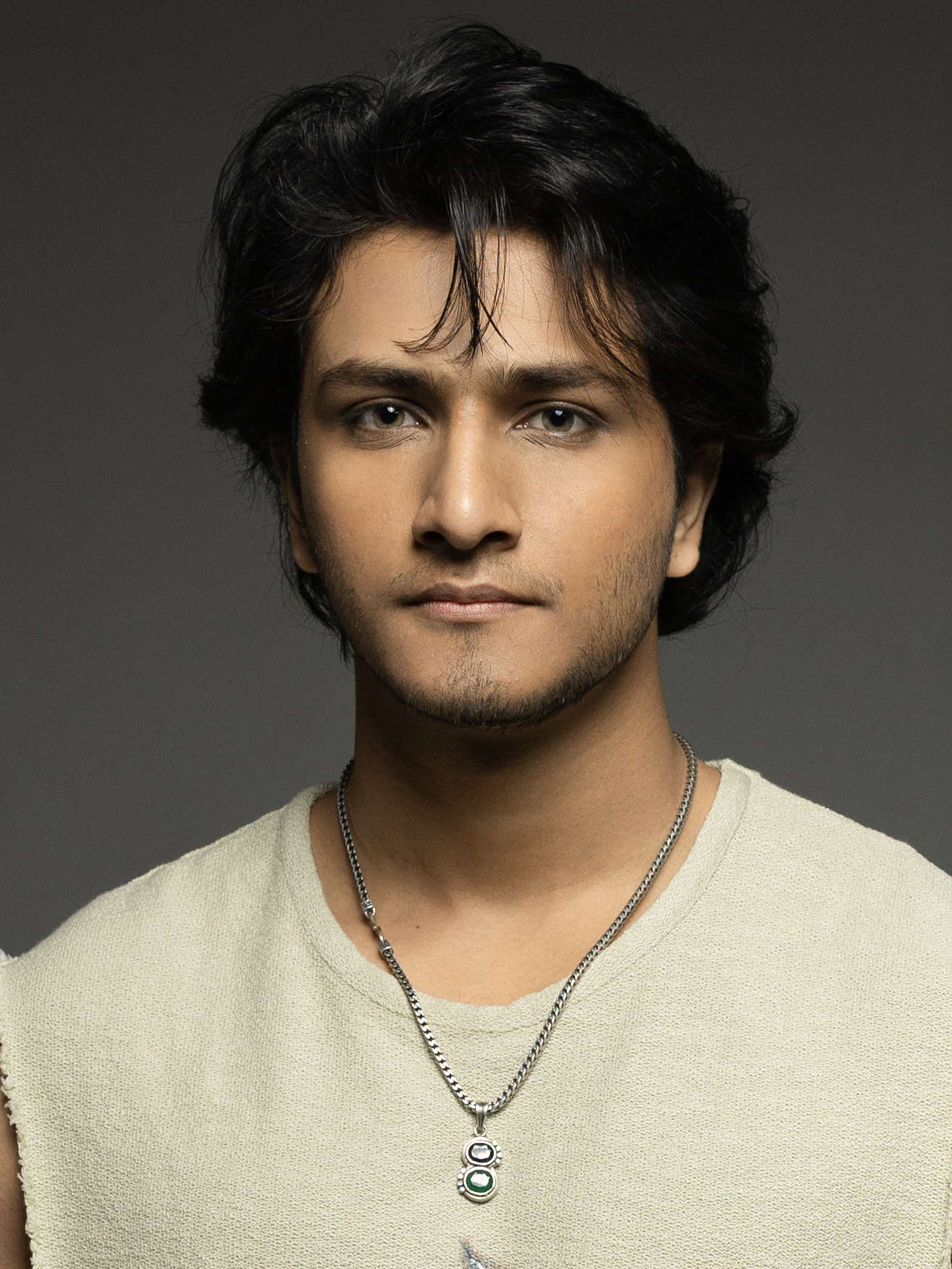
- Lankesh in 2025
- Born: Bengaluru, Karnataka, India
- Occupation: Actor
- Years active: 2012–present
- Father: Indrajit Lankesh

Samarjit Lankesh is an Indian actor who primarily works in Kannada films. He made his lead adult acting debut in the action drama Gowri (2024).

== Early life ==
Born into a family with a cinematic and literary heritage, he is the son of director and producer Indrajit Lankesh and the grandson of writer-filmmaker P. Lankesh. whose works are considered seminal in modern Kannada literature. He is nephew of Gauri Lankesh and Kavitha Lankesh.

He later pursued theatre studies and received training in acting and filmmaking from an institute in New York, equipping him with a foundation for his career in the entertainment industry.

== Career ==
He started his career in films playing one of the leads in the bilingual film Summer Holidays as a child. In 2024, Samarjit made his acting debut as lead in the Kannada film Gowri, directed by his father, Indrajit Lankesh.

== Filmography ==
Year	Title	Role	Language	Notes
2012	Dev Son of Mudde Gowda	Young Dev	Kannada	Child actor; uncredited
2015	Luv U Alia	Boy in elevator	Kannada	Child actor; uncredited
2018	Summer Holidays	Unnamed	English; Kannada	Child actor
2024	Gowri	Raja and Gowri	Kannada	SIIMA Award for Best Male Debut – Kannada; Filmfare Award for Best Male Debut – South
2025	Vrusshabha	Hayagreeva and Tej Varma	Telugu	Partially reshot in Malayalam
