= Undu Hoda Kondu Hoda =

Undoo Hoda Kondoo Hoda
- VCD cover
- Directed by: Nagathihalli Chandrashekar
- Written by: Nagathihalli Chandrashekar
- Produced by: K. B. Swamyshankar; G. Kumaraswamy; Shivaram Krista
- Starring: Anant Nag; Tara; Anjali Sudhakar; Maanu; Tennis Krishna
- Cinematography: S. Ramachandra
- Edited by: Suresh Urs
- Music by: Vijaya Bhaskar
- Production company: Padmamba Combines
- Release date: 1992
- Running time: 136 minutes
- Country: India
- Language: Kannada
- Budget: ₹12 lakh

Undoo Hoda Kondoo Hoda is a 1992 Indian Kannada-language satirical film written and directed by Nagathihalli Chandrashekar, making his debut in film direction. The film stars Anant Nag, Tara and Anjali Sudhakar, whilst M. S. Umesh, Tennis Krishna, Vijay Kashi and Maanu feature in other prominent roles. The film was produced under the Padmamba Combines banner.

The film's plot deals with a "cow" inspector played by Anant Nag who comes to a village from city and plays his tricks on the innocent minds of the villagers and wins over them by cheating. The sequence that unfolds later are shown in a comical way. Nagathihalli won the Best Story Award at the 1991–92 Karnataka State Film Awards.

== Cast ==
- Anant Nag as Krishna
- Tara as Rukmini
- Maanu as Dundappa
- Vijay Kashi as Balu
- Shimoga Venkatesh
- M. S. Umesh as Katra
- Tennis Krishna as Girisha "Kamangi"
- Uday Huttinagadde as Kalleshi
- Anjali Sudhakar as Rum Rum
- Girija Lokesh as Ningi
- Shobha Raghavendra as Kaalamma
- Thyagaraj Urs
- Dingri Nagaraj as Dingi
- Anubhava Aravind as tea shop owner in Kamangipura
- Karibasavaiah as Karimale
- Nagathihalli Chandrashekar in a cameo (uncredited)

== Production ==
The film was Nagathihalli Chandrashekar's debut as a director. He was encouraged to direct films by Anant Nag after he was impressed with Chandrashekar's screenplay in their earlier collaboration, Udbhava (1990). For Undu Hoda Kondu Hoda, Chandrashekar into screenplay a short story he wrote based on an incident that occurred in his village. It was a story of a man who pretended to be a cow inspector and cheated people by robbing them off their money by building false dreams. Chandrashekar added, "The irony of the story is that in a place where there is no drinking water, the protagonist spreads dreams of a land overflowing with milk, butter, ghee." The film was shot in a village outside Shimoga in Karnataka. Many stage actors were used in the film by Chandrashekar, including Karibasavaiah.

== Soundtrack ==
The music of the film was composed by Vijaya Bhaskar. Lyrics for the soundtrack except one track was written by Nagathihalli Chandrashekar. A poem of K. S. Narasimhaswamy was included in the soundtrack.

Undoo Hoda Kondoo Hoda

Soundtrack album by Vijaya Bhaskar
- Released: 1991
- Genre: Feature film soundtrack
- Label: Sangeetha

No.	Title	Lyrics	Singer(s)	Length
1.	"Nakka Haage Natisabeda"	K. S. Narasimhaswamy	Vani Jairam, Rajkumar Bharathi
2.	"Bandano Bandano Bhagyava Thandano"	Nagathihalli Chandrashekar	B. R. Chaya, Vishnu
3.	"Lolalotte Ee Baduku"	Nagathihalli Chandrashekar	S. P. Balasubrahmanyam
4.	"Undu Hoda Kondu Hoda"	Nagathihalli Chandrashekar	Vani Jairam

== Awards ==
- Karnataka State Film Award for Best Story — Nagathihalli Chandrashekar
