= Prabhat Kalavidaru =

Prabhath Kalavidaru (Kannada: ಪ್ರಭಾತ್ ಕಲಾವಿದರು) is a theatre group based in Bangalore, India. Started in the year 1930, this group has staged many drama performances and is famous for its ballets. One of the most popular of their ballets is Cinderella, based on the English fairy tale and since 1977, has been staged more than a thousand times by the troupe.

== History ==
Prabhath Kalavidaru was started in 1930 by Harikatha Vidwan Shri Gopinath Das with the support from his brothers Karigiri Das, Jayasimha Das, and Dwarakanath who hailed from a traditional Brahmin family and were Harikatha exponents. Prabhath Kalavidaru is a creative assemblage of highly talented and well-trained dancers, actors, singers, choreographers and technicians. The Prabhath Team, based in Bangalore has created over 20 ballets on a wide spectrum of subjects. The Team also has the unique distinction of giving thousands of performances to packed audiences all over the world. The group was named Gururaja Orchestra and Nataka Mandali and was based in Tumkur. Later, financial trouble and the quest for a larger audience brought the family to Bangalore. Gopinath Dasaru, regarded as the de facto leader of the group, incorporated new technologies in the performances and this helped draw large audiences. Rather than just being narrative, the plays incorporated themes from dances and folk traditions which was different from what was offered by the traditional drama troupes and this is considered an important reason for their success. The group was renamed Prabhath Kalavidaru in the year 1945. One of the first troupes to present Indian classical dance forms in the form of ballet, historians opine that the emergence of Prabhath Kalavidaru also heralded a cultural renaissance in the state of Karnataka. Some of the well-known artists of Kannada cinema like C. R. Simha, Srinath, Manjula, and Lokesh started their careers with Prabhath Kalavidaru. Initially, many of the artists and technicians involved in the performances belonged to the founding family and at one point there were as many as 60 members of the family, spanning four generations who were actively involved. Now many people from outside the family are also involved in the affairs of the troupe.

== Ballets ==
The Prabhath Kalavidaru Ensemble includes a selection of ballets and plays on subjects varying from mythology to fantasy. The ballets by Prabhath Kalavidaru are an amalgamation of India's rich dancing heritage. The plays portray the unmistakable magic of Indian drama. Music for all the Prabhath Kalavidaru creations has been specially composed by renowned stalwarts. The dances have also been personally choreographed by reputed Dance Gurus. Special emphasis has been laid on the research of the subjects to provide an authentic and enriching experience for the audience. Lot of experimentation is involved in enacting these dramas like amalgamating Western dance forms with Indian classical dance forms to create some sort of a fusion dance style and also using special lighting techniques to enhance the appeal of the drama. Prabhat Kalavidaru were one of the first theatre groups in India to introduce pre-recorded dialogues and lip-synchronisation. To compose songs and music for their plays, the troupe had built a small recording studio in their house itself. They also manufacture the masks, headgear, shields, swords, silk and velvet costumes needed for the plays. Creation of a play is a complex task and it takes about two years and a budget of about Rs.1 to 1.5 million ($25 to 35 thousand) for the group to produce a play. The troupe's most popular production to date is Cinderella which has been performed more than a thousand times. Initially staged as a musical, the drama has undergone changes with time and in the 1000th performance; new music, stage settings and lightings were used.

== Productions ==
	Title	Language	Duration (in minutes)
	Mythological		
1.	Shree Rama Prateeksha	Kannada/ Hindi/ Tamil/ Telugu	20-120
2.	Shree Krishna Vyjayanthi	Kannada/ Hindi/ Tamil/ Telugu	20-120
3.	Hari Bhaktha	Kannada	60- 90
4.	Mahishasura Mardhini	Kannada/ Hindi/ Tamil	30-50
5.	Uttara Gograhana	Kannada/ Telugu	75
6.	Mohini Bhasmasura	Kannada/ Hindi	40
7.	Bhagavad Gita	Sanskrit	10-20
8.	Keechaka Vadhe	Kannada	45
	Historical		
9.	Karunada Vybhava	Kannada/ English	30-75
10.	Dharma Bhoomi	Kannada/ Hindi/ Tamil/ Telugu/ Sanskrit/ English	60-90
11.	Vijayanagara Vybhava (Sri Krishnadevaraya)	Kannada/ Telugu	60-75
	Fantasy		
12.	Cindrerella	Kannada	90
13.	Kindari Jogi	Kannada	30
14.	Punyakoti	Kannada	15

== Other activities ==
Prabhat Kalavidaru also rents out the costumes, audio equipment and stage sets to other theatre groups and this is another source of income for them. They also run a dance school which is headed by Hema Panchamukhi, a famous actress in Kannada Cinema and the granddaughter of the founder Gopinath Dasa.

== Current scenario ==
The group still stages Dance Dramas and despite more outsiders getting involved in the production of the plays, the overall management is looked after by Harish Prabhath, the grandson of Gopinath Dasaru. They recently created their website which has all the details of their performances.
