= Vrusshabha =

2025 film by Nanda Kishore

- Theatrical release poster in Telugu
- Directed by: Nanda Kishore
- Written by: Nanda Kishore
- Dialogues by: SRK; Janardhana Maharshi; Karthik
- Produced by: Shobha Kapoor; Ekta Kapoor; C. K. Padma Kumar; Varun Mathur; Saurabh Mishra; Abishek S. Vyas; Praveer Singh; Vishal Gurnani; Juhi Parekh Mehta
- Starring: Mohanlal; Neha Saxena; Samarjit Lankesh
- Cinematography: Antony Samson
- Edited by: K. M. Prakash
- Music by: Sam C. S.
- Production companies: Connekkt Media; Balaji Motion Pictures; Abishek S Vyas Studios
- Distributed by: Geetha Arts; Aashirvad Cinemas; Pen Movies; KVN Productions
- Release date: 25 December 2025
- Running time: 124 minutes
- Country: India
- Language: Telugu
- Budget: ₹30 crore

Vrusshabha is a 2025 Indian Telugu-language fantasy action film written and directed by Nanda Kishore. It was jointly produced by Connekkt Media and Balaji Motion Pictures, in association with Abishek S Vyas Studios. The film stars Mohanlal in the titular role, with Neha Saxena, Samarjit Lankesh, Ragini Dwivedi, Nayan Sarika, and Ajay appearing in supporting roles. The film was partially reshot in Malayalam. Principal photography took place between July 2020 and February 2025 in sporadic schedules. The film was simultaneously shot in Telugu and Malayalam languages for a bilingual release.

The film follows the intense journey of Adidev, a powerful and successful businessman whose life is entwined with ancient destiny and family conflict. As he builds his empire, not everyone is pleased with his rise—particularly rivals Darpan and Guna. When Adidev's son Tej Varma begins to experience memories from a past life, he uncovers a shocking truth: Adidev was once a mighty king who committed grave acts in that incarnation, and Tej now believes he has been reborn to bring his father to justice.

Vrusshabha released in theatres on 25 December 2025 to highly negative reviews. The film was deemed one of the worst films in Mohanlal’s career and was classified as a box office disaster.

== Plot ==
Vrusshabha is a fantasy action drama structured around two parallel timelines, one set in the present day and the other in a mythological past. The film explores themes of reincarnation, fate, and the enduring consequences of past actions.

In the present, Aadi Deva Varma, a wealthy Mumbai businessman, is plagued by disturbing visions and recurring nightmares suggesting a connection to a previous life. As the story unfolds, Aadi is revealed to be the reincarnation of Vijayendra Vrusshabha, a powerful ancient king and warrior. Tej, the son of Aadi, is disturbed by his father's nightmares so with lover Damini visits Swamy Varaha but could not get any information so visits Aadi's hometown to meet Leela devi but gets attacked by Guna's brother. Aadi rescue Tej but suddenly when Leela devi enters the area Tej stabs Aadi. Aadi gets awaken at hospital by nightmares sees Tej handcuffed but telling Vrushaba's death will be in his hands. Damini tells Vrushaba to meet Swamy Varaha and so Varaha reveal the past.

The past narrative centers on King Vrusshabha, whose accidental killing of a child leads to a curse foretelling that he will be responsible for his own son's death. Haunted by this prophecy, his wife Queen Triloka secretly gives their infant son to Yashoda, the wife of Pashupati who is right hand of Vrusshabba and sends their infant son away to protect him. Years later, the son, raised by Pashupati as the warrior Hygrava, unknowingly confronts Vrusshabha while attempting to obtain spastalinga statue believed to save his people. Vrushaba identifies his son in hygrava so withdraw from the fight during this time a masked warrior enters and fights Hygrava. Pashupati enters calling hygrava to stop fight that distract the masked warrior and Hygrava by this time cuts away the head, Pashupati reveals his original parents as Vrushaba and Triloka whose head is cut. Hygrava commits suicide and vows to be reborn to seek vengeance against his father telling instead of surrender the Spastalinga statue he sent Triloka to fight him.

In the present timeline, Tej is revealed to be Hygrava's reincarnation. Guided by a spiritual figure, Aadi confronts the truth of their shared past. Through ritual, prayer, and reconciliation, the cycle of vengeance is ultimately broken that showing Triloka consoles Hygrava and says all that happened was caused by the lord, now these revelations gives Hygrava's soul salvation and so Tej now identifies Aadi asks forgiveness that gets accepted by Aadi who loves his son Tej very much and hugs Tej. Guna who was sent to jail for twenty years comes with goons to revenge Aadi by killing both Aadi with Tej at this point but gets beaten down. Tej was about to kill Guna but Aadi knocks away the weapon from Tej's hand. The film concludes with Aadi choosing restraint and compassion, instead of taking revenge.

== Cast ==
- Mohanlal in a double role as
  - Raja Vijayendra Vrusshabha is a King
  - Aadi Deva Varma is a Businessman
- Samarjit Lankesh in a double role as
  - Hayagreeva
  - Tej Varma
- Ragini Dwivedi in a double role as
  - Triloka
  - Leela Devi
- Neha Saxena as Yashodha
- Nayan Sarika as Damini
- Ajay as Pashupati
- Vinay Varma
- Ramachandra Raju as Guna
- Ali as traveller
- Kishore as Doctor Ajay
- Ayyappa P. Sharma
- Raghu Hondadakeri
- Jeetendra (special appearance)

== Production ==
=== Development ===
On 3 July 2023, producer Ekta Kapoor announced that her production house Balaji Telefilms is partnering with Connekkt Media and AVS Studios for a bilingual film, Vrusshabha, to be shot in Telugu and Malayalam languages, starring Mohanlal in the lead role, with Nanda Kishore set to direct. It is the first production of AVS Studios. In August 2023, Kishore told to a media that he had been writing the screenplay of Vrusshabha since the last five years. The dialogues were written by SRK, Janardhan Maharshi, and Karthik. Kishore described the film as "fantasy action drama". The posters feature the tagline "Reborn love: A love so strong, it defies death." It was reported that the film would be shot in India and the United Kingdom.

Kishore stated that the film drew inspiration from Indian mythological epics, and that he spent 3 – 4 months developing the idea before beginning the writing process. According to Kishore, the film is structured around the concept of a karmic cycle. He illustrates this through the story of King Harishchandra, whose unwavering commitment to his promises results in severe personal hardship despite his innocence. Vrusshabha adopts a similar framework, presenting human experiences as an outcome of an ongoing karmic cycle and destiny. He envisaged Mohanlal in the lead role after completing the first draft of the screenplay. The production company came on board after Mohanlal agreed to the project. In August 2023, the makers announced that Hollywood producer Nick Thurlow has joined as an executive producer.

=== Casting ===
On casting Mohanlal, Kishore said that the protagonist required the gravitas of an actor of Mohanlal's stature, remarking, "Mohanlal is someone who acts with his eyes". He added that Mohanlal could convincingly handle both action sequences and fatherly emotions. According to Kishore, Mohanlal's character draws from both King Harishchandra and Lord Rama. His character is modelled on Vṛṣabha, a divine warrior figure associated with Lord Shiva. In November 2022, it was reported that the makers are in talks with Vijay Deverakonda to portray the son of Mohanlal's character. By July 2023, Roshan Meka, Shanaya Kapoor, Ramachandra Raju, and P. Ravi Shankar were reported to be part of the cast. Confirming his involvement, Meka, who was cast as the son, described the role as "challenging". The film marks the acting debut of Kapoor, daughter of Sanjay Kapoor, who was reportedly pared opposite Meka. Ragini Dwivedi was also confirmed in July. Zahrah S. Khan was initially cast as a warrior princess after a look test. In January 2024, Raghu Hondadakeri's involvement was confirmed.

In January 2025, Neha Saxena confirmed her role as Yashodha, one of the important characters. She completed four shooting schedules—one in Mysore and three in Mumbai. Both Meka and Kapoor were recast following some casting changes over dates availability. In February 2025, following the film's completion, it was reported that Meka was replaced by Samarjit Lankesh. Reportedly, Lankesh had camped in Mumbai and other locations for four months to complete filming. For his role, he underwent training in horse riding, sword fighting, and gymnastics. In the same month, it was also reported that Kapoor was replaced by Nayan Sarika as the female lead. B. V. Bhaskar portrayed a psychiatrist and filmed his portions over six days in Mumbai. The film also features Ajay, Vinay Varma, Ali, Kishore, and Ayyappa P. Sharma in significant roles. Bollywood actor Jeetendra makes a special appearance in the film.

=== Filming ===
Principal photography began on 23 July 2023. Battles scenes involving Mohanlal were filmed on a set in Mysore. The first schedule was completed on 22 August. Filming resumed with a second schedule in Mumbai beginning on 13 October. Production was subsequently delayed for a period; in June 2024, Kishore attributed the delay to technical reasons and stated that approximately 50 percent of the filming had been completed.

Mohanlal resumed filming his portions in December 2024. The final schedule took place in Mumbai. On 3 February 2025, Mohanlal announced the completion of the film's shoot in its entirety. Kishor later recalled that pre-production lasted two years, while principal photography was completed over approximately 80 – 85 days. Resul Pookutty and Vijay Kumar handled the sound design. Peter Hein, Stunt Silva, Ganesh Kumar, and Nikhil choreographed the action sequences.

== Soundtrack ==
The film's music was composed by Sam C. S.. The soundtrack album was distributed by T-Series, released on 14 December 2025 in Malayalam, Telugu, Kannada, and Hindi languages.

All lyrics are written by Kalyan Chakravarthy.

Vrusshabha – Telugu
No.	Title	Singer(s)	Length
1.	"Appa Song"	Vijay Prakash	4:32
2.	"Love Song"	Anurag Kulkarni	3:55
3.	"Om Nama Shivayah"	Sukhwinder Singh	3:49
4.	"Thandavam"	Deepak Blue	3:07
5.	"Theme Song"	Aniruddha Sastry	3:23
Total length:			18:46

Vrusshabha – Malayalam
No.	Title	Lyrics	Singer(s)	Length
1.	"Appa Song"	Vinayak Sasikumar	Madhu Balakrishnan	4:33
2.	"Love Song"	Shanker Ramakrishnan	Kapil Kapilan	3:55
3.	"Om Nama Shivayah"	Vinayak Sasikumar	Sukhwinder Singh	3:49
4.	"Thandavam"	Kalyan Chakravarthy	Deepak Blue	3:07
5.	"Theme Song"	Kalyan Chakravarthy	Aniruddha Sastry	3:23
Total length:				18:47

== Release ==
In November 2024, Aashirvad Cinemas, a production company associated with Mohanlal, announced that the film is scheduled to be released on 16 October 2025. In May 2025, Mohanlal officially announced the same release date. The film, reportedly shot in Telugu and Malayalam, has dubbed versions in Hindi and Kannada languages.

The release was subsequently rescheduled to 6 November 2025, and later postponed again to 25 December, coinciding with Christmas. The film was distributed in Telugu-speaking states by Geetha Film Distributors.

== Reception ==
Vrusshabha received negative reviews from critics.

The Indian Express rated it 1 out of 5 stars and described the film as "one of the biggest messes" in Mohanlal's recent career, criticising its weak writing, incoherent narrative, and lack of emotional engagement.

Cinema Express wrote "Mohanlal can’t save this unimaginative reincarnation tale".

OTTPlay rated 2 out of 5 stars and described the film as "Nanda Kishore's fantasy film falls short of appeal in spite of Mohanlal's presence".

India Today criticised the film's weak story and poor effects.
