= Sa (film) =

- Directed by: Hemanth Hegde
- Written by: Hemanth Hegde
- Produced by: Uday Shetty
- Starring: Vijay Suriya; Karthik Jayaram; Samyukta Hornad; Hemanth Hegde
- Cinematography: Suresh Bairasandra
- Edited by: Shiv Prasad Yadav
- Music by: Veer Samarth
- Production company: Shri Hari Productions
- Release date: 26 August 2016
- Country: India
- Language: Kannada

Sa is a 2016 Indian Kannada-language romantic thriller film directed by Hemanth Hegde. It stars Vijay Suriya, Karthik Jayaram, Samyukta Hornad and Hegde.

== Plot ==
The story takes place in Coorg in the background of a home stay. A personal conflict in the family turns serious when an intruder enters the family.

== Cast ==
- Vijay Suriya
- Karthik Jayaram
- Hemanth Hegde
- Samyukta Hornad
- Anuradha Mukerjee
- Doddanna

== Production ==
Karthik Jayaram plays an ornithologist and learnt horseback riding for the film. A twenty-five day schedule took place in Muthappa Rai farm house in Chikmagalur.

== Marketing ==
The film was noted for its different approach of having wanted posters featuring the cast members of the film.

== Reception ==
A critic from The Times of India rated the film two-and-a-half out of five stars and wrote that "For those who like relationship capers that go beyond the candyfloss genre, this could still be worth a visit to the cinema halls".
