= 8MM Bullet =

2018 Indian crime thriller film

- Directed by: Harikrishna
- Written by: Sri Ganesh
- Based on: 8 Thottakkal by Sri Ganesh
- Produced by: Narayan Babu
- Starring: Vasishta N. Simha; Mayuri Kyatari
- Cinematography: Antony R. Vincent
- Edited by: Suresh Armugam
- Music by: Judah Sandhy
- Release date: 16 November 2018
- Running time: 146 minutes
- Country: India
- Language: Kannada

8MM Bullet is a 2018 Kannada language crime thriller film directed by Harikrishna. It stars Vasishta N. Simha and Mayuri Kyatari. The film was a remake of Tamil film 8 Thottakkal (2017) which itself was loosely inspired by the 1949 Japanese movie Stray Dog.

== Plot ==
An orphaned Karthik gets framed by the employer for the murder of his wife and is sent to juvenile prison. He befriends the warden, who helps him become an SI.

Karthik remembers his warden's words to be honest in his profession. Unlike the other police at his station, he refuses to be involved in bribes and is made an outcast. One day, Karthik helps a writer who is beaten by his corrupt Inspector Devaraj. Due to ego issues, Devaraj plans to shame Karthik by arranging him to shadow a dangerous gangster. While shadowing the gangster, he loses his gun, fully loaded with 8 bullets. Devaraj gives him a day to find his lost gun or face disciplinary consequences. With the help of a reporter friend Smitha, Karthik nabs the boy who pickpocketed his gun, but the boy has sold the gun to a dealer. The dealer tells that he had sold the gun to a middle-aged man. The man attempts a bank robbery along with two accomplices, and in the process, he accidentally shoots and kills a little girl. Smitha, in danger of losing her job tells her superiors about the case, it goes viral, due to which Karthik is suspended from duty.

Karthik hides from the police as he will be arrested, and is tracked down by Pandian, the new handler of the case, Pandian motivates Karthik to retrieve his lost gun and joins him in his search. Meanwhile, one of the robbers tries to buy his girlfriend a necklace for her birthday and takes all the fresh notes available, despite the boss's opposition. In the jewelry shop, he is exposed as the police kept track of the serial number of the fresh notes. He escapes the arrest and goes to get his share. After a confrontation with the boss, he tries to steal all the money and the leader shoots and kills him. The remaining two dispose of the body. The second robber fearing he also will be shot dead by the boss, contacts the police. When the police attempt to arrest the boss with a ploy, the boss shoots and kills the second robber and made sure there is no one left to connect him with the robber.

Karthik meets an old police man, Srinivas Murthy, who was suspended for letting a naxalite slip away as a constable. It turns out that Devaraj accepted a bribe from the naxalite and had helped him escape, but this has already ruined Murthy's profession. Karthik talks to Murthy about life and how things have changed. After this, Murthy sees the man who sold him the gun and leaves. Murthy kills him with the same gun when he follows Murthy to an isolated road. Murthy is actually the leader of the robbery, and he kills the officer who didn't sanction his Provident Fund. Karthik, looking for clues in the murder, finds Murthy's application sanctioned and goes to his house to give it to him. However, Murthy's son tells him that the application got sanctioned earlier, and Murthy gave the money to the family, by connecting the murder of the guy who sold the gun and Murthy's son's statement, Karthik figures out that Murthy is the robber.

Meanwhile, Murthy follows Devaraj to a bank and attempts another robbery and kills him, after which he throws the money on the street. When Murthy returns home, he finds out that the police have surrounded him. Pandian takes Murthy's grandson hostage. Pandian, with his gun on Murthy's grandsons head, slips, and a shot is fired. In shock, Murthy shoots and kills Pandian, but realize that Pandian's shot had missed and did not hit Murthy's grandson. Murthy grabs the gun and tells Karthik to shoot him. He explains that he did not revealed his cancer to his family, because he heard the family speaking about why God didn't take him instead of his wife. After hearing this, He robbed the bank for them and wanted to live his last days like a king. Murthy tells that he did not mean to shoot that child and felt guilty. Murthy grabs Karthik's hands, puts the gun to his forehead and says he doesn't want to put the family in shame by going to prison then shoots himself dead with the last bullet when Karthik hesitates.

== Cast ==
- Vasishta N. Simha as Karthik
- Mayuri Kyatari as Smitha
- Jaggesh as Srinivas Murthy
- Shobaraj as Devaraj
- Rockline Venkatesh as KK
- Adi Lokesh as Babu

== Soundtrack ==
The soundtrack was composed by Judah Sandhy.

- "Haniye Haniye" - Judah Sandhy, Shreya Sundar
- "Duniya" - Anthony Daasan
- "Jagava Ghora" - Vasishta Simha, Narayan Sharma
- "Title Track" - Judah Sandhy
- "Ardha Chandra" - Abhinandan Mahshale, Supriya Lohith

== Critical reception ==
Times of India gave 3.5 stars stating, "If cinema noir is your type and you enjoy narratives that try to break the stereotypes, 8MM Bullet is well up your alley." Bangalore Mirror wrote "There are not many flaws in the film except for the unwanted songs, [..] But otherwise, 8MM Bullet is an engaging crime thriller that shows Jaggesh in a never-before-role".

== See also ==
- Remakes of films by Akira Kurosawa
