= Suman Nagarkar =

Indian actress

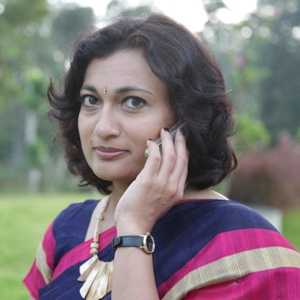
- Suman Nagarkar during the shoot of Ishtakamya
- Occupation: Actress
- Spouse: Gurudev Nagaraja

Suman Nagarkar is an Indian actress known for her work in Kannada cinema. She is noted for her appearances in Nishkarsha (1993), Nammoora Mandara Hoove (1996), Ammavra Ganda (1997), Hoomale (1998). After a hiatus of more than ten years, she returned to films with Ishtakamya (2015).

== Early life ==
Suman Nagarkar grew up in South Bangalore - Gandhi Bazaar, Basavanagudi. She completed her primary education at Mahila Seva Samaja school and later attended National High School. She obtained a BSc degree from National College. While in school, she was associated with Prabhath Kalavidaru.

== Film career ==
Suman Nagarkar was introduced to the Kannada film industry by director Sunil Kumar Desai. Kalyana Mantapa (1991) was her first film. She gained popularity from films such as Beladingala Baale (1995) and Nammoora Mandara Hoove (1996). She acted in the main role in the movie Beladingala Baale, where her face would not be shown to the audience. After appearing in several movies as a supporting actor, she performed as a lead actor in Hoomale (1998), directed by Nagathihalli Chandrashekhar. In April 2001, she left for the US with her family, hoping that she "...would like to return together after spending some years in California." Her final projects included Preethsu Thappenilla (2000), G. V. Iyer's Sri Krishna Leele (2003), and the television series Ankura.

After a long gap of 15 years, she returned to acting in Ishtakamya, directed by Nagathihalli Chandrashekar, Jeerjimbe directed by Karthik Saragur and ...Re, directed by Sunil Kumar Desai. Nagarkar also acted in Kavitha Lankesh's Summer Holidays. In 2018, she appeared in a short film titled Grey, based on the effects of online piracy on the film industry. It was released on YouTube.

== Filmography ==
Key
†	Denotes films that have not yet been released

- All films are in Kannada, unless otherwise noted.

Year	Film	Role	Notes	Ref.
1991	Kalyana Mantapa	Shantha		
1993	Nishkarsha	Suman		
1995	Beladingala Baale	Ramya		
1996	Prema Sethuve	Parvati		
1996	Nammoora Mandara Hoove	Sudha		
1997	Mungarina Minchu	Varsha		
1997	Manava 2022	Jaishree		
1997	Ammavra Ganda	Bindu		
1998	Hoomale	Subhashini	Udaya Film Award for Best Actress	
1998	Doni Sagali	Deepti		
2000	Preethsu Thappenilla	Priya		
2000	Sri Krishna Leele			
2015	Ishtakamya	Roshini		
2016	...Re		Cameo in song "Savi Nenapina"	
2017	Jeerjimbe		Nominated—Filmfare Award for Best Supporting Actress – Kannada	
2017	Grey	Mauna	Short film	
2018	Summer Holidays		English/Kannada film	
2019	Babru	Sana/Srishti		
2020	DOTs	Yamuna	Hindi film	
2020	Brahmi	Aadya		
2022	Stalker			
2022	Rangapravesha	Madhavi		
