= Bangarada Mane =

- VCD cover
- Directed by: H. R. Bhargava
- Written by: Kunigal Nagabhushan
- Screenplay by: H. R. Bhargava
- Story by: Om Saiprakash
- Produced by: Bharathi Devi
- Starring: Devaraj; Sithara; Hema; Dheerendra Gopal
- Cinematography: D. V. Rajaram
- Edited by: Nagesh B. Yadav
- Music by: Rajan–Nagendra
- Production company: Chinni Chithra
- Distributed by: Chinni Chithra
- Release date: 31 May 1996
- Running time: 136 min
- Country: India
- Language: Kannada

Bangarada Mane is a 1996 Indian Kannada film, directed by H. R. Bhargava and produced by Bharathi Devi. The film stars Devaraj, Sithara, Hema and Dheerendra Gopal in lead roles. The film had musical score by Rajan–Nagendra.

== Cast ==
- Devaraj as Chandranna
- Sithara as Megha
- Kashinath in special appearance
- Siddartha as Rajesha
- Hema Panchamukhi as Ranjani
- Dheerendra Gopal as Bettappa
- M. S. Umesh
- Shivakumar as Raaja
- Aravind as Govinda
- MD Kaushik as Srinivasa
- Naveen as Nandeesha
- Nagesh Mayya as Bhadra
- Disco Shanthi
- Padma Vasanthi as Savithri
- Ashalatha as Bettayya's wife
- Bhavyashree Rai as Shobha
- Nayana as Saroja
- Prema as Kamala
- Sampreetha as Padmavathi
- Kunigal Nagabhushan as Hallaki
- Shani Mahadevappa as Veerayya
- M. S. Karanth as Marriage beega
- Premraj as Jagadisha

== Soundtrack ==
The film score and the soundtrack were composed by Rajan–Nagendra.

Track	Song	Singer(s)
1	"Collegelli Teenejalli"	K. S. Chithra, S. P. Balasubrahmanyam
2	"Kannadadha Manninalli"	S. P. Balasubrahmanyam
3	"Khulla Khulla"	K. S. Chithra
4	"Naagappana Poojeyannu Madona"	K. S. Chithra
5	"Nee Prema Khaidi"	K. S. Chithra, S. P. Balasubrahmanyam
6	"Yaarige Yaaru"	K. S. Chithra, S. P. Balasubrahmanyam
7	"Yaarige Yaaru (Bit)"	K. S. Chithra, S. P. Balasubrahmanyam
