= Dore (film) =

- Poster
- Directed by: Shivamani
- Written by: Rajanand Richard Louis [Dialogues]
- Screenplay by: Shivamani
- Story by: Kum. Veerabhadrappa
- Based on: "Beliya Hoogalu" by Kum. Veerabhadrappa
- Produced by: M. Chandrashekar
- Starring: Shiva Rajkumar; Hema Panchamukhi; Bharathi
- Cinematography: Krishna Kumar
- Edited by: K. Balu
- Music by: Hamsalekha
- Production company: Sri Nimishamba Productions
- Release date: 3 November 1995
- Running time: 147 minutes
- Country: India
- Language: Kannada

Dore (transl. The Ruler) is a 1995 Indian Kannada-language romance drama film directed by Shivamani and produced by M. Chandrashekar. The film stars Shiva Rajkumar, Hema Panchamukhi and Bharathi. The story is based on the novelist Ku. Veerabhadrappa's novel Beliya Hoogalu.

The film's score and soundtrack was scored by Hamsalekha and the cinematography was by Krishna Kumar.

== Cast ==
- Shiva Rajkumar
- Hema Panchamukhi
- Bharathi
- Srinivasa Murthy
- Ponnambalam
- Dheerendra Gopal
- Sudheer
- Girija Lokesh
- Ashalatha
- Vaijanath Biradar
- Rajanand
- Bank Suresh
- Bharath Kumar
- Pailwaan Venu
- Aiyappa M. M
- Dingri Nagaraj
- Vasudeva Rao
- Kashi
- Shankar Ashwath

== Soundtrack ==
The soundtrack of the film was composed by Hamsalekha.

Track listing
No.	Title	Lyrics	Singer(s)	Length
1.	"Halli Haadu Thandana"	Hamsalekha	S. P. Balasubrahmanyam, K. S. Chithra
2.	"Laaliya Thumba"	Hamsalekha	S. P. Balasubrahmanyam, K. S. Chithra
3.	"Ago Bandhanu"	Hamsalekha	K. J. Yesudas, K. S. Chithra
4.	"Ramanna Ninge Kosambari"	Hamsalekha	S. P. Balasubrahmanyam
5.	"Hunnimeya Deepa"	Hamsalekha	S. P. Balasubrahmanyam
6.	"Thai Thai Thai"	Hamsalekha	Mano, S. Janaki
7.	"Raitha Raitha"	Hamsalekha	Rajkumar
