= Ishtakamya =

- Ishtakamya poster
- Directed by: Nagathihalli Chandrashekhar
- Screenplay by: Nagathihalli Chandrashekhar
- Based on: Ishtakamya by Dodderi Venkatagirirao
- Produced by: Y. N. Shankare Gowda
- Starring: Vijay Suriya; Mayuri Kyatari; Kavya Shetty; Rangayana Raghu; Mandya Ramesh; B. Jayashree
- Cinematography: Ravi Kumar Sana
- Edited by: Srikanth
- Music by: B. Ajaneesh Loknath
- Production company: Nagathihalli Cine Creations
- Release date: 13 May 2016
- Country: India
- Language: Kannada

Ishtakamya is a 2016 Kannada-language romantic drama film directed by Nagathihalli Chandrashekhar is based on the 1980s novel of the same name written by Dodderi Venkatagiri Rao. The film features Vijay Suriya of Agni Sakshi fame, Mayuri Kyatari of Ashwini Nakshatra fame and Kavya Shetty in the lead roles and is releasing on 13 May 2016. Kannada's top film editor Srikanth edited the film.

== Plot ==
Dr. Aakarsh is a young and aspiring doctor who wants to treat poor people in his village. He is running a hospital which his grandfather has built. He meets with an accident with "Acchari" ( Mayuri Kyatari) and brings her to his hospital. While treating her, he slowly starts falling in love with her. Acchari is impressed by Dr Aakarsh's simplicity and his caring nature. A thick romance seems to develop between the two until they are confronted by Aditi (Kavya Shetty ) who claims to be the wife of Dr. Aakarsh. This shocks Acchari and she demands an explanation from Aakarsh. Aakarsh reveals his past to Acchari. In the flashback, it is revealed that Aakarsh and Aditi were married. Aditi is an adamant woman who is also a "clean freak". She doesn't want to get closer to Aakarsh, this sparks differences between the couple and eventually Aditi leaves him.

However, Aditi later realizes her mistake and wants to get back together. This leaves Aakarsh in a fix. He has to decide between Acchari and Aditi. However, Aakarsh decides to surprise Aditi by taking her to a poet's house. But on their way Aditi meets with an accident. Acchari's mother confronts her to go away from the couple as Acchari's father too cheated her mother. Aditi dies at Aakarsh's hospital's door reminding that she had said 'I will never keep leg in this small nurse home even after death'. Acchari leaves to another place in aeroplane to achieve her dream to become a pilot. Aakarsh doesn't get Aditi neither Acchari.

== Cast ==
- Vijay Suriya as Dr. Aakarsh
- Mayuri Kyatari as Acchari
- Kavya Shetty as Aditi
- Suman Nagarkar as Roshini
- Prakash Belawadi as Vikranth
- Rangayana Raghu
- Mandya Ramesh
- B. Jayashree
- Mimicry Dayanand
- Chikkanna as Nimbe

== Soundtrack ==
Ishtakamya

Soundtrack album by B. Ajaneesh Loknath
- Released: 20 April 2016
- Recorded: 2016
- Genre: Feature film soundtrack
- Producer: B. Ajaneesh Loknath

B. Ajaneesh Loknath chronology
RangiTaranga (2015)	Ishtakamya (2016)	Akira (2016)

The music composed by B. Ajaneesh Loknath comprises a poem written by Kuvempu. It is reported that the song named "Jenaguva" is shot in Kavishaila.

Track list
No.	Title	Singer(s)	Length
1.	"Nee Nanagoskara (duet)"	B. Ajaneesh Loknath, Shreya Ghoshal
2.	"Naa Ninage"	Chintan Vikas
3.	"Thangaali"	Shreya Ghoshal
4.	"Payanadalli"	Vijay Prakash
5.	"Chinte Yavudu"	Nagathihalli Chandrashekar
6.	"Naa Ninage"	Mukhtiyar Ali
7.	"Nee Nanagoskara (female)"	Shreya Ghoshal
