= Vijay Suriya =

Indian actor and presenter

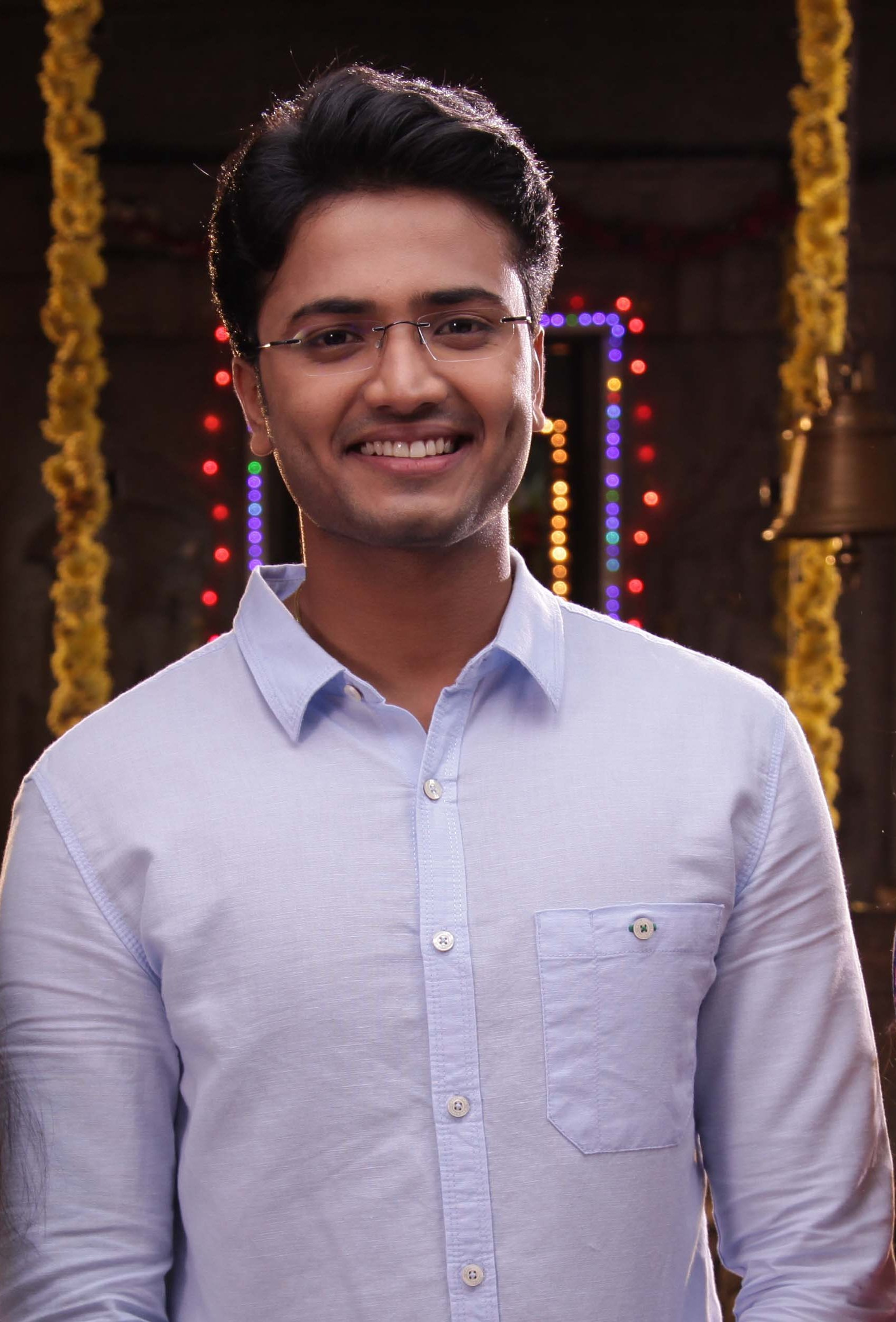
- Suriya during Ishtakamya promotion, 2015
- Born: Vijay Suriya; 7 September 1990 (age 36); Bangalore, Karnataka, India
- Other name: Vijay Lalitaa Suriya
- Occupations: Actor; television presenter
- Years active: 2011–present
- Spouse: Chaitra (m. 2019)
- Children: 2

Vijay Suriya (born 7 September 1990) is an Indian actor and presenter. He is noted for his work in the Kannada-language Colors Kannada soap opera Agnisakshi.

== Early life ==
Suriya did his schooling at Clarence Public School and his pre-university education at Christ University in Bangalore. He took acting lessons in Whistling Woods Academy, Mumbai run by filmmaker Subhash Ghai. He has an elder brother. Suriya married a family friend and IT professional, Chaitra, in 2019. They have had two children together.

== Career ==
Suriya made his screen debut in 2012, with the film Crazy Loka, in which he was cast opposite Harshika Poonacha. It was directed by Kavitha Lankesh, and saw Suriya play the son of Ravichandran's character.

Suriya rose to fame by 2014 from Agnisakshi, a television series, which aired on Colors Kannada. He then appeared in Nagathihalli Chandrashekhar's directorial Ishtakamya (2016). His next film, Sa, with Karthik Jayaram and Samyukta Hornad, was released in the same year. In 2019, Suriya had his next film release, titled Kaddu Mucchi. Suriya then hosted Comedy Talkies, a comedy show judged by Srujan Lokesh and Rachita Ram. After the soap Premaloka (2019), Suriya featured in Switch { Case N (2024) as an aspiring cricketer who lands a job in the IT sector and has to deal with the internal politics at his workplace. He made his debut in Telugu television with the soap, Krishnamma Kalipindi Iddarini, a remake of the Bengali series Saanjher Baati, in which he portrayed a visually impaired man. Speaking about the character, he stated: "My character Eshwar is not blind by birth but becomes blind due to an accident and develops a strong sense of hearing after this vision loss."

== Filmography ==
=== Films ===
Key
†	Denotes films that have not yet been released

Year	Film	Role	Notes
2012	Crazy Loka	Abhay	Nominated—SIIMA award for Best Debutant Male
2016	Ishtakamya	Dr. Aakarsh	
2016	Sa		
2019	Kaddu Mucchi	Siddharth	
2022	Gaalipata 2	Revantha	Cameo appearance
2024	Switch { Case N:	Siddharth	
TBA	Veeraputra†	TBA	Filming

=== Television ===
Year	Title	Role	Notes
2004	Uttarayana		
2013	Lakshmi Baramma	Siddharth	
2013–2020	Agnisakshi	Siddharath	
2014	Thaka Dhimi Tha Dancing Star	Contestant	Eliminated in 4th week
2018	Comedy Talkies	Host	
2019–2020	Premaloka	Surya	
2020–2021	Jothe Jotheyali	Surya	Extended Cameo appearance
2023–2024	Namma Lachhi	Sangam	
2023	Krishnamma Kalipindi Iddarini	Easwar	Telugu series
2024–2025	Drishti Bottu	Datta Bhai	Kannada TV Serial
2026–Present	Jagadhatri	Surya IPS	Kannada TV Serial

== Awards ==
Anubandha Awards

- Best Pair (with Vaishnavi Gowda)
- 2014-15: Most Popular Actor
- 2016–17: Most Popular Actor
- 2017–18: Most Popular Actor
- 2018–19: Most Popular Actor
