= Kalyana Mantapa =

- VCD cover
- Directed by: V. Govindaraj
- Written by: T N Narasimhan
- Screenplay by: T N Narasimhan; Chi. Udayashankar
- Produced by: Parvathamma Rajkumar
- Starring: Raghavendra Rajkumar; Mohini; Shivaranjini
- Cinematography: B. C. Gowrishankar
- Edited by: S Manohar
- Music by: Upendra Kumar
- Production company: Sri Chakreshwari Combines
- Release date: 6 November 1991
- Country: India
- Language: Kannada

Kalyana Mantapa (transl. Wedding Hall) is a 1991 Kannada language romantic comedy written by T. N. Narasimhan and directed by V. Govindaraj. The film stars Raghavendra Rajkumar, Mohini and Suman Nagarkar. The movie was produced by Parvathamma Rajkumar and presented by Dr.Rajkumar. Upendra Kumar worked as the music director. The film was a box office success.

The movie is based on the 1967 Tamil movie Ooty Varai Uravu.

== Cast ==
- Raghavendra Rajkumar as Shankara
- Mohini as Sudha
- Suman Nagarkar as Shantha, Shankara's sister
- T. N. Balakrishna as Nanjundaiah, Shankara's grandfather
- Mukhyamantri Chandru as Alasingachar Perumal
- Vaishali Kasaravalli as Vedavalli
- Dheerendra Gopal as Mahadevaiah, Shankara's father
- Girija Lokesh as Mahadevaiah's wife
- Umashree as Mahadevaiah's sister
- M. S. Umesh as Sudha's father
- Shankar Rao as Anjana Shastri
- Negro Johnny
- Shivaranjini
- Mandeep Roy
- Shanthamma as Sudha's grandmother

== Production ==
Doordarshan play writer T N Narasimhan recommended Suman Nagarkar to play Raghavendra Rajkumar's sister. She was paired opposite him in the unreleased film Ward No 11, which began production in 2019.

== Soundtrack ==
The music was composed by Upendra Kumar. All lyrics by Chi. Udayashankar.

Song	Singer(s)
"Namma Aasthiya Mele"	Raghavendra Rajkumar, Kusuma, Chorus
"Namma Aasthiya Mele"	Sangeetha Katti
"Baare Cheluve"	Raghavendra Rajkumar
"Ombatthu Ombatthu Thola"	Dr. Rajkumar
"Madanana Hoova Baana"	Raghavendra Rajkumar
"Ee Bhoomi Thayane"	Raghavendra Rajkumar, Sangeetha Katti, Chorus
