= Nanna Prakara =

Kannada language mystery thriller film

- Directed by: Vinay Balaji
- Written by: Vinay Balaji
- Screenplay by: Vinay Balaji
- Story by: Vinay Balaji
- Produced by: Gururaj S Kiran K Talasila; Jagadish; Govindh S Venkatesh; Krishnamurthy
- Starring: Kishore; Priyamani; Mayuri Kyatari
- Cinematography: Manohar Joshi
- Edited by: Satish Chandraiya
- Music by: Arjun Ramu
- Release date: 23 August 2019
- Country: India
- Language: Kannada

Nanna Prakara (transl. According to me) is a 2019 Indian Kannada language mystery thriller film written and directed by Vinay Balaji, making his debut. It is produced by Gururaj S under his banner G.V.K Combines and is co-produced by Kiran Talasila, Jagdeesh, Venkatesh, Govind. S and Krishnamurthy. The film starring Kishore, Priyamani and Mayuri Kyatari in the lead roles while, Arjun Yogi, Niranjan Deshpande, Pramod Shetty and Girija Lokesh are in the ensemble supporting cast. The music for the film is scored by Arjun Ramu. The cinematography is by Manohar Joshi and editing is done by Satish Chandraiya.

== Cast ==
- Kishore as Ashok
- Priyamani as Dr Amrutha
- Mayuri Kyatari as Vismaya
- Pramod Shetty as Kumar
- Girija Lokesh as Shardhamma
- Arjun Yogi
- Niranjan Deshpande
- Tiger Sushma Raj

== Plot ==
The story begins with the discovery of a charred car on a forest highway containing a burnt body. Inspector Ashok (Kishore) investigates but finds no immediate clues, as the number plate is destroyed. A visiting card found at the scene becomes the only lead.

The next day, Sam and Mary report their friend Vismaya missing. It is later revealed that the burnt body is Vismaya (Mayuri Kyatari). Forensic analysis finds traces of scopolamine on a handkerchief near the body. The car is identified as belonging to Vishal, a drug dealer, who is arrested after drugs and alcohol are found in his flat. Vishal confesses that he was in a relationship with a woman named Vismaya, whom he claims was pregnant. After refusing to marry her and assaulting her, he assumes she is dead and places her in his car trunk, but later sees the car being driven away.

Parallelly, Ashok's wife Amrutha (Priyamani) reveals that Vismaya was her patient and was about to marry a man named Suman. Suman's mother informs them that he has met with an accident. At the hospital, doctors state that Suman suffered severe nervous system damage. Amrutha reveals that Vismaya had undergone a kidney transplant earlier, making pregnancy impossible. Vishal then clarifies that his girlfriend was Vismaya Suresh, not the same Vismaya. Her body is later found in the car trunk, confirming his account.

Amrutha explains that Vismaya had lost both kidneys due to illness, and Suman had donated one to her after she saved his mother's life. In the present, Suman, unable to speak, writes his version of events: he and Vismaya fell in love and planned to marry. One day, she called him begging for help. On his way, his vehicle broke down, and he accepted a ride from Vishal and Vismaya Suresh. When he reached Vismaya's apartment and found it empty, he met with an accident outside the gate and was thus hospitalized.

Ashok reviews CCTV footage from the apartment and discovers that Mary and Sam were present near Vismaya's flat while pretending not to know her. A search of Mary's apartment reveals drugs and a photograph of four friends—Mary, Sam, Sujay, and Neha. All four later go missing.

Ashok uncovers that the four had no real connection to Vismaya. He traces links between them, a rowdy named Vicky, SI Kumar (his subordinate), and Dr. Aravind, who performed the autopsy. Kumar is arrested, and the full sequence of events is revealed: After a noise complaint, Mary and her friends mistakenly go to Vismaya's apartment, threaten her, and eventually murder her. They prevent her from answering the door when a courier arrives, making it appear the flat is empty. They later stage the crime using Vishal's car, framing it as an accident.

To cover up the murder, Sujay involves Vicky, SI Kumar, and Dr. Aravind to falsify evidence and the autopsy report. When the investigation tightens, Sujay kills the other three friends and is later killed by Kumar to eliminate the final witness. Kumar also kills Vicky to prevent the truth from being revealed.

With all conspirators exposed, the case is solved.

== Production ==
Actor Kishore, has said "With Nanna Prakara, working with a first-time director ensures that there is a different insight into filmmaking and a young energy on set, which rubs off on everyone" while talking about the Principal photography. The film will mark the directorial debut of Vinay Balaji. Priyamani, who plays a doctor on the film said she put a lot of effort "to play the role convincingly".

== Soundtrack ==
The soundtrack for the film is done by Arjun Ramu. The film's audio rights have been sold Zee Music South.

No.	Title	Lyrics	Singers	Length
1.	"Hoo Nage"	Kiran Kaverappa	Karthik, Anuradha Bhat	5:00
2.	"Naa Aakarshithalagiruve"	Kaviraj	Shweta Mohan, Santhosh Venky	4:34
3.	"Nanna Prakara"	Chethan Kumar (director)	Sivam	4:12
Total length:				14:21

== Reception ==
The Times of India wrote, "For starters, he has two powerhouse performers — Kishore and Priya Mani — in the lead and he is confident about the strength of the content, which had his protagonists intrigued enough to work with him. “At the centre of the narrative is a murder mystery that Kishore, as Inspector Ashok, is investigating".
