= Ammavra Ganda =

- Theatrical release poster
- Directed by: Phani Ramachandra
- Story by: Gayathri P. Ramachandra
- Produced by: M. K. Srinivasa Murthy
- Starring: Shiva Rajkumar; Bhagyashree
- Cinematography: D. V. Rajaram
- Edited by: Basavaraj Urs
- Music by: Raj
- Production company: Akshaya Enterprises
- Release date: 11 July 1997
- Running time: 141 minutes
- Country: India
- Language: Kannada

Ammavra Ganda (transl. Henpecked) is a 1997 Indian Kannada-language romantic comedy film directed by Phani Ramachandra and produced by M. K. Srinivasamurthy. The film stars Shiva Rajkumar, Bhagyashree of Maine Pyar Kiya fame in her debut Kannada film and Suman Nagarkar in lead roles.

== Cast ==
- Shiva Rajkumar as Raju
- Bhagyashree as Rani
- Suman Nagarkar as Bindu
- Balaraj
- Vijay Kashi
- Loknath
- Mukhyamantri Chandru
- Shivaram
- Sihi Kahi Chandru
- Girija Lokesh
- Rekha Das
- Manjubhashini as Rani's sister
- Sithara in Cameo

== Soundtrack ==
The soundtrack of the film was composed by Raj.

Track listing
No.	Title	Lyrics	Singer(s)	Length
1.	"Hennu Gandige Gulamalalla"	Shyamsundar Kulkarni	S. P. Balasubrahmanyam, Manjula Gururaj
2.	"Uma Rama Shama Suma"	M. N. Vyasa Rao	Rajesh Krishnan, Manjula Gururaj, Chandrika Gururaj
3.	"Love Mado Reethiyanu"	Shyamsundar Kulkarni	S. P. Balasubrahmanyam, Manjula Gururaj
4.	"Jolly Jolly Picnic"	M. N. Vyasa Rao	Manjula Gururaj
5.	"Neeli Meghagalu"	Su. Rudramurthy Shastry	Shivarajkumar
6.	"Sri Krishnanu Nodalu"	Su. Rudramurthy Shastry	S. P. Balasubrahmanyam
7.	"Hendathiginta Munchene"	Shyamsundar Kulkarni	S. P. Balasubrahmanyam

== Reception ==
Times of India wrote "Whatever has happened to Phani Ramachandra? Of course, he was never the master of the large canvas, never had artistic pretensions, never made a great film. But he had his ear to the pulse of the average cinemagoer he could twist formula quite cleverly to make us laugh. Each time you came out of a Phani film, you thought, not bad, but let’s hope he betters himself next time. His Gowri Ganesha, for instance, was hugely popular. Ammavara Ganda had immense promise as a rib-tickle". The Hindu wrote "Overall, although “Ammavra Ganda” is a comedy in patches, thanks only to Shiva Rajkumar, it is not a film with a definite social message as it is made to believe by the director; if anything, it is a bit of a spoof on women's clamour for equality. Unwittingly, Phani Ramachandra also reveals the sad state of a woman's world which is confined to a stereotyped, limited role."
