= Gowri (2024 film) =

Indian musical film

- Theatrical release poster
- Directed by: Indrajit Lankesh
- Written by: Indrajit Lankesh
- Dialogues by: B. A. Madhu; Rajshekar K. L.; Maasti; Manu Tapasvi
- Produced by: Indrajit Lankesh
- Starring: Samarjit Lankesh; Saanya Iyer
- Cinematography: A. V. Krishna Kumar
- Edited by: K. M. Prakash
- Music by: Songs: Jessie Gift; Chandan Shetty; Shivu Bergi; Aniruddha Sastry; Score: Mathews Manu
- Production company: Laughing Buddha Films
- Release date: 15 August 2024
- Running time: 130 minutes
- Country: India
- Language: Kannada

Gowri is a 2024 Indian Kannada-language action drama film written and directed by Indrajit Lankesh. The film stars Samarjit Lankesh in a dual role, alongside Saanya Iyer, Manasi Sudheer, Sampath Maitreya, and Rajeev Pillai.

== Cast ==
- Samarjit Lankesh in a dual role as
  - Raja
  - Gowri
- Saanya Iyer as Samantha
- Manasi Sudheer as Gowri’s mother
- Sampath Maitreya as Jogi Siddappa, Gowri’s father
- Rajeev Pillai
- Manju Pavagada
- Nawaz as Gowri's friend
- Priyanka Upendra in a Guest appearance
- Chandan Kumar in a Guest appearance
- Ricky Kej in a Guest appearance
- Vasundhara Das in a Guest appearance
- Yogesh in a Guest appearance
- Akul Balaji in a Guest appearance

== Production ==
"There's a misconception that what happened to Gauri is part of the film's storyline. I want to assure you, her story is not being used for promotional purposes. Though the film is a youth romantic thriller, I named it after my sister to honour her without making her story a direct part of the film".

— Indrajith Lankesh

The film was initially titled Gauri, but was later changed to Gowri. Despite the similarity in names, the film has no connection to director Indrajit Lankesh's sister, Gauri Lankesh. Indrajit Lankesh found inspiration for the film during the COVID-19 pandemic's second wave after reading an article about a real-life incident. Indrajit's son Samarjit Lankesh makes his acting debut in this film. Saanya Iyer, known for her role as a child actress in the TV series Putta Gowri Maduve, makes her debut as a lead actress. The film was shot in various locations including Bangalore and Chikkamagaluru. In January 2024, it was announced that Saanya Iyer had completed her dubbing sessions.

== Soundtrack ==
Gowri

Soundtrack album by: Songs: Jessie Gift, Chandan Shetty, Shivu Bergi, Aniruddha Sastry; Score: Mathews Manu
- Released: 2024
- Genre: Feature film soundtrack
- Length: 28:38
- Language: Kannada
- Label: Anand Audio

Audio Jukebox
- Gowri Audio Jukebox on YouTube

The soundtrack features songs composed by Jessie Gift, Chandan Shetty, Shivu Bergi, and Aniruddha Sastry, while the background score was composed by Mathews Manu.

Track listing
No.	Title	Lyrics	Music	Singer(s)	Length
1.	"Time Baruthe"	Vijay Eshwar	Chandan Shetty	Chandan Shetty	4:21
2.	"Love you Samantha"	Kaviraj	Jessie Gift	Javed Ali	3:38
3.	"Dhool Yebsava"	Shivu Bhergi	Shivu Bhergi	Aniruddha Sastry, Ananya Bhat	4:04
4.	"Muddada Ninna"	Kaviraj	Jessie Gift	Nihal Tauro	4:08
5.	"Gowri Title Track"	K. Kalyan	Jessie Gift	Kailash Kher	3:37
6.	"Thayine Jagakella"	V. Nagendra Prasad	Jessie Gift	Kailash Kher	4:30
7.	"Time Raadhu Ra Malli"	Varadaraj Chikkaballapura, Gubbi, Vijay Eshwar	Chandan Shetty	Aniruddha Sastry, Vasundhara Das, Chandan Shetty	4:20
Total length:					28:38

== Release ==
Gowri was released theatrically on 15 August 2024 coinciding with Independence Day.

== Reception ==
Y Maheswara Reddy of Bangalore Mirror rated the film three out of five stars and wrote that "The director, by including people with different abilities in the star cast, conveys that nothing is impossible if there is dedication and commitment." Vivek M. V. of The Hindu wrote that "Directed by Indrajith Lankesh, Gowri is filled with commercial cinema stereotypes and fails to looks beyond its debutant protagonist".

A Sharadhaa of The New Indian Express gave it three out of five stars and wrote that "Indrajit Lankesh aims to blend commercial entertainment with a motivational social theme in Gowri but struggles to leave a lasting impact. While the film’s emotional core, especially the heartfelt depiction of the mother’s support, resonates deeply, it falters in critical areas." Shashiprasad SM of Times Now gave it three out of five stars and wrote that "Gowri is clearly a film that introduces Samarjit Lankesh as a promising actor. Also, it has enough for wholesome entertainment with the trademark features of Indrajit Lankesh at his best."

Sridevi S of The Times of India gave it three out of five stars and opined that "Indrajit Lankesh’s films are known for candy floss romances. But, for Gowri, he puts Samarjith’s talent show on a pedestal at every opportunity available. The story, too, is very predictable and is a bit outdated. The storytelling needed a touch of freshness for the audience to appreciate the film as well as the newbie actors’ performances." Bharath Anjanappa of The Hans India gave it three out of five stars and wrote, "Overall, Gowri effectively serves as a launchpad for newcomers Samarjit and Saanya, both of whom show considerable promise for the future of Kannada cinema."

Jagadish Angadi of Deccan Herald gave it three out of five stars and noted that "Overall music falls short of leaving a lasting impression. The camera work, despite capturing stunning locations, is average. One notable inconsistency is the portrayal of the protagonist's hearing impairment; he somehow manages to hear conversations in several scenes, which defies logical explanation."
