= America! America!! =

1997 Indian Kannada family drama film

- DVD cover
- Directed by: Nagathihalli Chandrashekhar
- Written by: Nagathihalli Chandrashekar
- Screenplay by: Nagathihalli Chandrashekar
- Produced by: G. Nandakumar
- Starring: Ramesh Aravind; Akshay Anand; Hema Panchamukhi
- Cinematography: Sunny Joseph
- Edited by: Basavaraj Urs
- Music by: Mano Murthy
- Production company: Vishwapriya Films
- Release date: 11 April 1997
- Running time: 153 minutes
- Country: India
- Language: Kannada

America! America!! is a 1997 Indian Kannada-language family drama film written and directed by Nagathihalli Chandrashekhar. It stars Ramesh Aravind, Akshay Anand and Hema Panchamukhi, with H. G. Dattatreya, Vaishali Kasaravalli and Shivaram in supporting roles. The plot revolves around three childhood friends hailing from a coastal village of Karnataka who are entangled in marital issues with a major portion of the story taking place in the United States. The film makes an attempt to study the mindset of non-resident Indians settled abroad at the time.

The film was produced by G. Nandakumar under Vishwapriya Films banner and was made on a budget of ₹ 2 crores. Around seventy-eighty percent of filming was in the US, mainly San Francisco. Rest of the shots were canned in the coastal regions of Kundapura, Udupi District and Chikmagalur District of Karnataka. The film's acclaimed soundtrack was composed by Mano Murthy, who debuted as a film composer.

The film released in early 1997 and achieved both critical and commercial success. Upon release, the film won the National Award for Best Kannada film in the regional category. This was followed by a string of other awards in best actor and best film categories. Emerging as a commercial success, the film had grossed around ₹ 1.1 crore within the first two months of its release.

== Plot ==
The movie begins with the story of three childhood friends – Surya, Shashank and Bhoomi – are from the coastal region of Karnataka. After finishing their undergraduate studies, Shashank goes to the US for further studies. Surya is extremely patriotic about India and does not want to go anywhere and starts his business in his hometown, and Bhoomi stays at home. After three years, Shashank comes back to India. He starts going off on India on his way from the airport, saying how much greater America is. While in India, his family arranges his marriage to Bhoomi. Surya, on the other hand, is the one who truly loves Bhoomi and tries to tell her using a recorded audio tape and plants it in Bhoomi's room having no idea that she is to be married to Shashank.

That evening Surya learns of the marriage plans. Confused, he rushes to Bhoomi's house to take the tape back. But before he could get there, someone who was cleaning Bhoomi's room accidentally replaces it with another cassette. Surya, thus unknowingly, grabs the wrong tape and throws it into a nearby river. After the marriage ceremony, Shashank and Bhoomi leave for the US.

Everything goes well until Shashank loses his job and starts to drink. Surya, in the meantime, surprises Bhoomi and Shashank and goes to the US for business, but an egotistical Shashank does not come to pick him up at the airport. Surya ends up taking a cab to Shashank's house. Bhoomi and Shashank drive Surya to a lot of places around. After a few days, Bhoomi and Shashank realize that Surya has come to the US on a business visit and has a very good business running back in India. Bhoomi feels very happy with Surya's achievement. On Bhoomi's and Shashank's anniversary, Surya throws them a surprise and gifts them a rabbit. Next day, they all go to a party hosted by Indians in the US. In the party, a man foul mouths India. Surya hits him, angering Shashank. Shashank leaves Surya behind at the party, forcing him to walk all the way back home.

On the way back, Bhoomi plays a tape in the car, the same tape Surya had recorded in India, conveying his love for her. It had come with Bhoomi's bag from India. Shashank asks Soorya to get out of their house and blames India and Indian culture. After Surya leaves their house, he starts suspecting Bhoomi. One day, Bhoomi searches for her rabbit (Minchu), but cannot find her; Shashank tells her he already cooked and ate it, later he tells Bhoomi that he donated the rabbit to a humane society, as it reminded him of Surya. They both start arguing, then Bhoomi moves out and starts living separately from Shashank. Shashank finds a new job and later learns that Soorya has helped him get that job. Alone, Shashank realizes his mistake and feels guilty. He calls Surya and apologizes. Surya forgives him and learns that Bhoomi has separated from him. He tells Shashank not to take any steps until he returns to the US, and Surya leaves for the U.S.

From San Francisco Airport, Surya calls Shashank, who is drunk. This time around, Shashank promises to pick him up from the airport. On the way he meets with a horrific accident. After being informed by the airport authorities, Surya rushes to the hospital. Meanwhile, Bhoomi also gets the news about Shashank and she too rushes to the hospital. On meeting Bhoomi and Surya, Shashank apologizes for his behavior and tells them that he is going to die. Doctor takes him to ICU and he passes away.

Surya manages all legal formalities around Shashank's funeral, making Bhoomi feel proud of him. Surya asks Bhoomi to return to India but she declines. By mistake, he tells that he loves her, but Bhoomi tells him she cannot love or marry him because he is her best friend and she would like him to remain so for rest of her life. Surya insists that she comes back to India and gives her a return ticket telling her that he would wait for her in the airport. Finally, Bhoomi relents and joins him in the plane. However, she tells him that she will not marry him and suggests that they be friends forever.

== Cast ==
- Ramesh Aravind as Surya
- Akshay Anand as Shashank
- Hema Panchamukhi as Bhoomika
- H. G. Dattatreya as Srinivas
- C. R. Simha as Surya's father
- Vaishali Kasaravalli as Bhoomika's mother
- Shivaram as Bhoomika's father
- Karen Vasudev as Linda
- Nagathihalli Chandrashekar (Guest Appearance)

== Production ==
Shooting began on 16 June 1996 at Ravindranath's house in Milpitas, California. The crew consisting only of 16 people went to America for the shoot. Some scenes were shot at St. Mary's Island at Karwar, Karnataka.

== Soundtrack ==
America! America!!

Soundtrack album by Mano Murthy
- Released: May 1996
- Recorded: 1996
- Genre: Feature film soundtrack
- Length: 26:16
- Label: Manoranjan Audio
- Producer: Mano Murthy

Mano Murthy chronology
America! America!! (1996)	Nanna Preethiya Hudugi (2001)

America based software engineer, Mano Murthy scored the music for the film. Two poems by Gopalakrishna Adiga and H. S. Venkateshamurthy were adapted. The lyrics for the remaining songs were written by Nagathihalli Chandrashekar. When Chandrasekhar came to United States to screen his film Kotreshi Kanasu, Murthy met him and composed one of the tunes which later became "Nooru Janmaku". The music was received well with all the songs climbing and hitting the musical charts for years. The song "Nooru Janmaku" was recreated in 2010 film of same name also directed by Chandrasekar.

Track listing
No.	Title	Lyrics	Singer(s)	Length
1.	"Nooru Janmaku"	Nagathihalli Chandrashekar	Rajesh Krishnan, Sangeetha Katti	4:18
2.	"Baanalli Odo Megha"	H. S. Venkateshamurthy	Rajesh Krishnan, Sangeetha Katti, Ramesh Chandra	4:57
3.	"Hegide Nam Desha"	Nagathihalli Chandrashekar	Rajesh Krishnan, Manjula Gururaj, Ramesh Chandra	4:21
4.	"Yaava Mohana Murali"	Gopalakrishna Adiga	Raju Ananthaswamy, Sangeetha Katti	4:51
5.	"America America"	Nagathihalli Chandrashekar	Rajesh Krishnan, Sangeetha Katti, Ramesh Chandra	5:21
Total length:				22:58

== Box office ==
The movie ran for 365 days in many centers of Karnataka and it was the first Kannada movie to be released in the United States. The movie was dubbed to Telugu and was released in Andhra Pradesh.

== Accolades ==
Award	Year	Category	Recipient(s) and nominee(s)	Result	Ref(s)
National Film Awards	15 July 1997	Best Kannada Film	G. Nandakumar	Won	
Karnataka State Film Awards	1996–97	Best Film	G. Nandakumar	Won	
Karnataka State Film Awards	1996–97	Best Actor	Ramesh Aravind	Won	
Karnataka State Film Awards	1996–97	Best Story	Nagathihalli Chandrashekhar	Won	
Videocon Screen Awards	1997	Best Actor	Ramesh Aravind	Won	
Aryabhata Film Awards	1997	Second Best Film	G. Nandakumar	Won	
Aryabhata Film Awards	1997	Best Story	Nagathihalli Chandrashekhar	Won	
Aryabhata Film Awards	1997	Best Screenplay	Nagathihalli Chandrashekhar	Won	
Aryabhata Film Awards	1997	Best Dialogue	Nagathihalli Chandrashekhar	Won	
Aryabhata Film Awards	1997	Special Award	H. G. Dattatreya	Won	
