= Dance USA Dance =

Reality TV show on Zee TV USA

- Also known as: DUD
- Genre: Reality TV, Competition
- Created by: 5678 Media Group
- Presented by: Sarish Khan
- Judges: Master Saroj Khan; Matt Steffanina; Lauren Gottlieb; Nakul Dev Mahajan
- Country of origin: United States
- Original languages: English, Hindi
- No. of seasons: 2

Production
- Executive producers: Ashwani Kumar, Anjana Kumar
- Camera setup: Multi-camera
- Running time: 1 hour

Original release
- Network: Zee TV USA
- Release: 9 September 2017 – present

Dance USA Dance, also known as DUD, is an international dance competition reality TV show that airs on Zee TV USA. It is created and produced by 5678 Media Group. In this dance competition, the teams are challenged to perform different styles of dance to South Asian or Bollywood music. The various dance forms featured are freestyle, hip-hop, Bollywood fusion, jazz, salsa, breaking, popping & locking, Bharatanatyam and Kathak.

The Dance USA Dance competition was premiered on 17 April 2017 with Bollywood choreographer Master Saroj Khan being the master judge of the first season. The second season of the show is to be telecasted in October 2018 with international celebrities Matt Steffanina, Nakul Dev Mahajan and Lauren Gottlieb as the Season 2 grand jury.

The show follows a format where a dance team is required to submit dance videos online; the selected teams are invited for auditions closest to their home city. Two teams are then selected from each city that move to the semi-finale where they compete against other city winners. This is the competition's main phase which culminates into a grand finale with one champion.

== Format ==
Registration for this competition requires dance teams to submit introduction videos of their dance routines through DUD's social media partner - BollyShake. The selected teams are invited to register and participate at the auditions closest to their home city. The contestants are judged in two categories: Junior – 6 to 12 years and Senior – 13+ years. At each audition, the qualifying round jury gives their feedback and scores on the performance and finally selects two teams to move to the Semi-Finale. The jury also reserves the right to pick wild-card entries.

The regional winners then compete in the semi-finals and during the grand finale, emerging semi-finalists will be challenged to put forth their best show to win the title of "Dance USA Dance" Season 2 champion. All contestants in the final event are judged on criteria of routine (25%), synchronization (25%), choreography (20%), presentation (20%), and voting by broadcast viewing audience (10%).

== Season details ==
=== Season 1 ===
For the first season, regional competitions were held at six cities namely San Francisco, Washington DC, Orlando, Atlanta, Seattle, and New York. The Season 1 finale was organized at Ritz Performing arts center in Elizabeth, NJ. The winning teams of the finale were awarded a cash prize, trophies and a bundle prize from various sponsors. Manish Jagwani was the choreographer for all teams.

==== Host ====
- Sunny Moza

==== Judges ====
- Saroj Khan
- Ryan Daniel Beck
- Asha Gopal
- David Guggino

==== Finalists ====
- Exodus Artistry was the winner
- Kriya Dance Academy (Adult) was the 1st runner up
- Arya Dance Academy (Youth) was the 2nd runner up

=== Season 2 ===
For this season, the regional rounds were held at 15 cities including Atlanta, Orlando, Washington DC, New Jersey, New York, Cincinnati, Dallas, San Jose, and Seattle. Dance USA Dance partnered with McDonald's for the second season and accepted global video entries from India, Pakistan, Turkey, Canada and Belarus. Final 12 teams were competing for a prize money of $15,000.

==== Host ====
Sarish Khan

==== Judges ====
Regional rounds

- Jesse Lee Santos
- Shivani & Chaya
- Greg Chapkis

Finale Judges

- Nakul Dev Mahajan
- Lauren Gottlieb
- Matt Steffanina

Winners

- Gurus Of Dance Senior (1st Place)
- PCIPA Rockstars Junior (1st Place)
