= Nagathihalli Chandrashekhar =

Indian actor and director

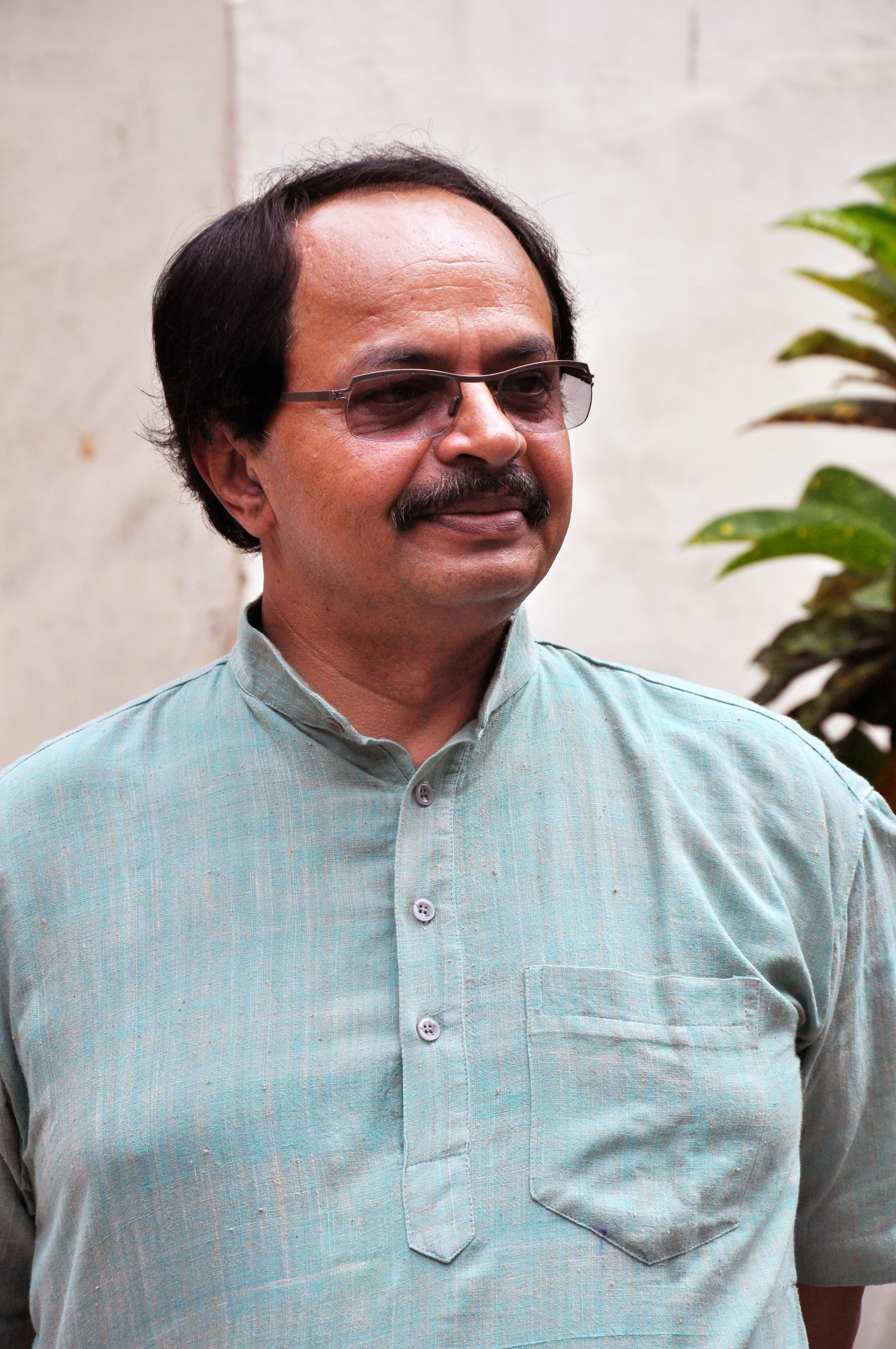
- Nagathihalli Chandrashekhar in October 2010
- Born: 15 August 1958 (age 68); Nagathihalli, Mandya district, Karnataka
- Occupations: Director; producer; screenwriter; lyricist
- Website: nagathihalli.in

Nagathihalli Chandrashekhar is an Indian director, actor, screenwriter and a lyricist who predominantly works in Kannada Cinema. He made his film debut as a screenplay writer in Kadina Benki (1986) which won the National Film Award for Best Feature Film and the Karnataka State Award. His directorial debut was Undu Hoda Kondu Hoda (1991) for which he won the Karnataka State Film Award for Best Story.

Three of his films, Kotreshi Kanasu (1994), America America (1996) and Hoomale (1998) have won National Film Award for Best Feature Film in Kannada.

== Filmography ==
=== As director ===
Year	Film title	Notes
1992	Undu Hoda Kondu Hoda	Debut Feature film
1993	Baa Nalle Madhuchandrake	
1994	Kotreshi Kanasu	
1997	America America	
1998	Hoomale	
2001	Nanna Preethiya Hudugi	
2002	Super Star	
2003	Paris Pranaya	
2005	Amrithadhare	
2007	Maathaad Maathaadu Mallige	Screened in Cannes Film Festival
2009	Olave Jeevana Lekkachaara	
2010	Nooru Janmaku	
2012	Breaking News	
2015	Ishtakamya	
2020	India vs England	Screened in Kolkata International Film festival-2019
2026	America America 2	Scheduled for theatrical release on 11 September 2026.

=== As writer ===
Year	Film title	Role
1988	Kadina Benki	Screenplay, dialogue and lyrics
1988	Sankranthi	Story and lyrics
1990	Prathama Ushakirana	Screenplay, dialogues and lyrics
1990	Udhbhava	Screenplay and lyrics
1995	Urvashi	Screenplay and lyrics
2002	Manasella Neene	Lyrics
2011	Puttakkana Highway	Movie based on own story Puttakkana Medical College
2017	Srikanta	Movie based on own 2-page short story Skhalana published in Taranga in 1985

==== As actor ====
- America! America!! (1997)
- Hoomale (1998)
- Nanna Preethiya Hudugi (2001)
- Super Star (2002)
- Paris Pranaya (2003)
- Mata (2006)
- Milana (2007)
- 9 to 12 (2011)
- Addhuri (2012)
- Breaking News (2012)
- America America 2 (2026)

=== Telefilms ===
- Directed telefilm on Suggi (Harvest festival) – Telecasted in Bangalore TV station in 1991
- Directed telefilm "Karunalu Baa Belake" – On Buddha's life and message, telecasted in Bangalore TV station in 1992
- Directed telefilm "Avalokana" – Telecasted in Bangalore TV station in 1995
- Directed telefilm "Kavya Saurabha" – Telecasted in Bangalore TV station in 1995
- Screenplay and Dialogues for the teleserials "Kaveri", "Vayyaari", "Aranyadallondu Aragini", "Raaga Lahari"

=== Mega serials ===
Mega serials that were telecast in Udaya TV

- Pratibimba
- Kaveri
- Bhagya
- Apartment
- Olave Namma Baduku
- Vataara

== Awards ==
National Film Awards

- 1994: Best Feature Film in Kannada — Kotreshi Kanasu
- 1996: Best Feature Film in Kannada — America America
- 1998: Best Feature Film in Kannada — Hoomale

Karnataka State Film Awards

- 1988–89: Best Story Writer — Sankranthi
- 1991–92: Best Story Writer — Undu Hoda Kondu Hoda
- 1994–95: Special Film of Social Concern — Kotreshi Kanasu
- 1996–97: First Best Film — America America
- 1996–97: Best Story Writer — America America
- 1998–99: Second Best Film — Hoomale
- 2002–03: Best Lyricist — Paris Pranaya
- 2005–06: Third Best Film — Amrithadhare
- 2007–08: Third Best Film — Maathaad Maathaadu Mallige
- 2015: Puttanna Kanagal Award

Filmfare Awards South

- 2001: Best Director – Kannada — Nanna Preethiya Hudugi
- 2003: Best Film – Kannada — Paris Pranaya

== Tent Cinema Film School ==
Nagathihalli Chandrasekhar along with his wife Shobha Chandrasekhar runs a prominent film school in Bangalore called Tent Cinema, that trains budding actors, directors, filmmakers and film technicians. Apart from him, the faculty includes senior members of the Kannada Film Industry.
