= List of Kannada films of 2013 =

A list of Kannada language films produced in the Kannada film industry in India in 2013.

- Films are generally released every Friday . And Thursday
- In addition films can be released on specific festival days.

== Box office collection ==
The highest-grossing Kannada films released in 2013, by worldwide box office gross revenue, are as follows.

The rank of the films in the following depends on the worldwide gross. The budget is only for knowledgeable purpose.

The highest worldwide gross of 2013
Rank	Title	Production company	Worldwide gross	References
1	Bulbul	Thoogudeepa Productions	₹25 crore (US$2.6 million)	
2	Bachchan	Sri Venkateshwara Krupa Entertainers	₹20 crore (US$2.1 million)	
3	Googly	Jayanna Combines	₹15 crore (US$1.6 million)	
4	Varadhanayaka	Shankar Productions	₹13 crore (US$1.4 million)	
5	Bhajarangi	Film Entertainers Path	₹12.5 crore (US$1.3 million)	
6	Raja Huli	Lakshmisri Combines	₹12 crore (US$1.3 million)	
7	Topiwala	Crazymindz	₹11 crore (US$1.2 million)	
8	Myna	Vajreshwari Combines	₹7 crore (US$740,000)	
9	Charminar	R. Chandru Films	₹5.7 crore (US$600,000)	

== Events ==
- State Film Awards 2011–12 announced on 14 March.
- 60th Filmfare Awards South, held 20 July 2013 in Hyderabad, Andhra Pradesh
- 2nd South Indian International Movie Awards, on 12–13 September 2013 in UAE
- Suvarna Film Awards, by Suvarna channel.
- Udaya Film Awards, by Udaya Channel
- Bangalore Times Film Awards

== Released films ==
=== January–June ===
Opening		Title	Director	Cast	Genre	Notes	Ref
J A N	11th	Galaate	M. D. Sridhar	Prajwal Devaraj, Kriti Kharbanda, Hardhika Shetty, Shashikumar, Tara	Romantic comedy	Produced by AMR Productions	
J A N	11th	Ee Bhoomi Aa Bhanu	K. C. Venugopal	Patre Ajith, Saranya Mohan, Suresh Heblikar	Romance	Produced by Srishti Creations	
J A N	11th	Kotlallappo Kai	Rishi	Yathiraj, Dhanush, Nayana, Sangeetha Shetty	Adult romance		
J A N	11th	Manasina Putadali	Prashanth K. Shetty	Kishan Bhandary, Raksha	Romance		
J A N	18th	Lakshmi	Raghava Loki	Shivarajkumar, Priyamani, Saloni Aswani, Komal Kumar	Action	Produced by Bharani Minerals	
J A N	25th	Varadhanayaka	Ayyappa P. Sharma	Sudeep, Chiranjeevi Sarja, Sameera Reddy, Nikesha Patel	Action	Remake of Telugu film Lakshyam; Produced by Shankar Productions	
F E B	1st	Bangari	Ma. Chandru	Yogesh, Ragini Dwivedi, Sadhu Kokila, Ramesh Bhat	Romantic comedy	Produced by Shivashankara Productions	
F E B	1st	Sandalwood Sa Re Ga Ma	Sharath Kadhri	Avinash, Sindhu Lokanath	Drama	Produced by Surabhi Talkies	
F E B	8th	Charminar	R. Chandru	Prem Kumar, Meghana Gaonkar, Kumudha	Romance	Produced by R Chandru films	
F E B	8th	Gombegala Love	Santhosh	Arun, Paavana Gowda, Ramakrishna, Achyuth Kumar, Shruthi	Romance		
F E B	14th	Attahasa	A. M. R. Ramesh	Arjun Sarja, Kishore, Suresh Oberoi, Vijayalakshmi, Lakshmi Rai, Bhavana Rao	Action / Crime	Produced by Akshaya Creations	
F E B	15th	Padhe Padhe	Peenya Nagaraj	Tarun Chandra, Akhila Kishore, Mridula Sathe	Romance	Produced by Nihal Movies	
F E B	15th	Devarane	Lucky Shankar	Ravishankar Gowda, Neethu, Sadhu Kokila, Tabla Nani, Bullet Prakash, Bank Janardhan	Comedy	Produced by Shiva – Shankar productions	
F E B	22nd	Myna	Nagashekar	Chetan Kumar, Nithya Menen, R. Sarath Kumar, Suhasini Maniratnam	Romance	Produced by Omkar Movies	
F E B	22nd	Hejjegalu	P. R. Ramadas Naidu	Baby Prakruthi, Achyuth Kumar, Sudha Belawadi,	Drama	Produced by Basanth Productions	
M A R	1st	Rajani Kantha	Pradeep Raj	Duniya Vijay, Aindrita Ray, Bullet Prakash, Rekha	Romance / Drama	Produced by K. Manju Films	
M A R	8th	Simple Agi Ondh Love Story	Sunil Kumar	Rakshit Shetty, Shwetha Srivatsav	Romance		
M A R	8th	Neenandre Ishta Kano	N T Jayarama Reddy	Dhruv Sharma, Myna, Roopanjali, Venkatesh Prasad, Sharan	Romance	Remake of Telugu film Ammayilu Abbayilu; Produced by Rubi cine craft	
M A R	15th	Topiwala	M G Srinivas	Upendra, Bhavana (Malayalam actress), Rangayana Raghu, Ravishankar	Action comedy	Produced by RS Productions	
M A R	15th	Yaarivanu	Madan Patel	Ravi Chetan, Madan Patel, Anuki, Neha, Riya Rao	Comedy	Produced by Media International	
M A R	22nd	CID Eesha	N. Rajesh Fernandes	Jaggesh, Mayuri, Komal Kumar, Rangayana Raghu, Avinash	Comedy	Remake of Malayalam film CID Moosa	
M A R	22nd	Ziddi	R. Anantha Raju	Prajwal Devraj, Aindrita Ray, Thilak Shekar, Aishwarya Nag	Action	Remake of Malayalam film Puthiya Mukham	
M A R	22nd	Nenapinangala	Dhanuchandra Mavinakunte	Hemanth, Supreetha, Sudha Belawadi	Romance	Produced by Om Sai Cine Creations	
M A R	29th	Veera	Ayyappa P. Sharma	Malashri, Ashish Vidyarthi, Komal Kumar, Mukul Dev	Action	Produced by Ramu Enterprises	
A P R	5th	Andhar Bahar	Phaneesh Ramanathapura	Shivarajkumar, Parvathy Thiruvothu, Shashikumar, Srujan Lokesh, Arundhati Nag	Action	Produced by Legends International	
A P R	5th	Bharath Stores	P. Sheshadri	Sudharani, H. G. Dattatreya, Chi Guru Dutt, V. Manohar	Drama	Produced by Basant Kumar Patil	
A P R	5th	Ee Banna Lokadali	V. Rama Rao	Ramesh Bhat, Veena Sundar, Rekha Das	Comedy	Produced by Ranga Creations	
A P R	5th	Arya's Love	Puneeth Arya	Shakti Kumar, Sukrutha Wagle	Romance	Produced by Christel Juice Entertainment Limited	
A P R	11th	Bachchan	Shashank	Sudeep, Bhavana, Tulip Joshi, Parul Yadav, Jagapathi Babu, Nassar, Ashish Vidyarthi, Pradeep Rawat, P. Ravi Shankar	Action	Produced by Sri Venkateshwara Krupa Creations	
A P R	12th	Manasa	Kodlu Ramakrishna	Anitha Rani, Shivadwaj, Srinivasa Murthy, Ramesh Bhat	Drama	Produced by Ani Arts	
A P R	12th	Akka Pakka	UK Das	Ravishankar Gowda, Tabla Nani, Radhika Gandhi	Comedy	Produced by Lalitha Deep Arts	
A P R	19th	Parari	K. M. Chaitanya	Shravanth, Shuba Poonja, Jahnavi Kamath, Shrunga, Bullet Prakash	Comedy	Produced by Shakti Entertainment Pvt Ltd.	
A P R	19th	Koormavatara	Girish Kasaravalli	Shikaripura Krishnamurthy, Jayanthi	Drama	Produced by Basant Productions	
A P R	19th	Belakinedege	Ajay Kumar	Karibasavaiah, Ramakrishna, Mohan Juneja, Champa Shetty	Drama	Produced by Tulsi Films	
A P R	19th	Gajendra	J. G. Krishna	Vinod Prabhakar, Daisy Shah, Srinivasa Murthy, Sharath Lohitashwa	Action	Produced by Arya Mourya Enterprises	
A P R	19th	Sri Amareshwara Mahatme	Aravinda Mulagunda	Abhijeeth, Sunanda Hospet, Ujwal, Bank Janardhan	Drama		
A P R	20th	Chathrigalu Saar Chathrigalu	S. Narayan	Ramesh Aravind, S. Narayan, Mohan Shankar, Umashri, Manasi, Sanathini	Comedy	Produced by Padma Sundari creations	
A P R	26th	Jataayu	Raaj	Raaj, Surabhi Santhosh, Roopasri, Avinash, Bullet Prakash	Action	Produced by Amogh Enterprises	
A P R	26th	Benki Birugali	Basheed	Rishi, Namitha, Rekha Vedavyas, Sandhya, Saloni Aswani, Monica	Thriller	Produced by SBK Films	
A P R	26th	Janma	Chandrachud	Santhu, Hemanth G Nag, Meenakshi, Sithara, Thalaivasal Vijay	Drama	Produced by Santhosh Movie Makers	
M A Y	10th	Bulbul	M. D. Sridhar	Darshan, Ambareesh, Rachita Ram	Drama / Romance	Remake of Telugu film Darling; Produced by Thoogudeepa Productions	
M A Y	10th	Madarangi	Mallikarjun	Krishna, Sushma Raj, Naksha Shetty, Sadhu Kokila, Avinash	Romance	Produced by Krishna Talkies	
M A Y	17th	Aane Pataaki	Chandrashekar Bandiyappa	Srujan Lokesh, Parvathi Nirban, Sadhu Kokila, Rangayana Raghu	Comedy	Remake of Hollywood film The Party; Produced by Ananya & Aishwarya Creations	
M A Y	17th	Kumbha Rashi	Chandrahas	Chetan Chandra, Roopika, Sharath Lohitashwa, Harish Rai	Action	Produced by Revanna Siddeshwara Creations	
M A Y	17th	Pagade	Hemanth G Nag	Vishwas Bharadwaj, Gamya	Drama	Produced by Sri Manjunatha Tele and Cine Productions	
M A Y	23rd	Election	Om Prakash Rao	Malashri, Pradeep Rawat, Suchendra Prasad	Action drama	Produced by Ramu Enterprises	
M A Y	24th	Jinke Mari	Naveen Kumar	Yogesh, Sonia Gowda, Ramesh Bhat, Avinash, Suman Ranganathan, Sharath Lohitashwa	Drama / Romance	Remake of Telugu film Bindaas; Produced by Peacock Cinemas	
M A Y	24th	Kaveri Nagara	Ravi Manjunath	Devaraj, Supreetha, Lohithaswa	Romance		
M A Y	24th	Story Kathe	K. R. Jagadisha	Thilak Shekar, Pratap Narayan, Neha Patil, Parvathy Nair	Thriller	Produced by Nirvaana Films	
M A Y	31st	Director's Special	Guruprasad	Dhananjay, Rangayana Raghu, Tabla Nani	Satire	Produced by Govindu	
M A Y	31st	Operation Diamond Racket (Re-release)	Dorai – Bhagawan	Rajkumar, Padmapriya, Vajramuni, Thoogudeepa Srinivas, Tiger Prabhakar	Spy	Original release in 1978; Produced by Anupam Movies	
J U N	7th	Kaddipudi	Duniya Soori	Shivarajkumar, Radhika Pandit, Rangayana Raghu, Avinash, Ananth Nag, Balu Nagendra	Action Crime	Produced by Sri Banashankari Chitralaya	
J U N	14th	Radhan Ganda	Murugan	Komal Kumar, Poorna, Aryan, Poorna Kumar	Comedy drama	Produced by Shantha Pictures	
J U N	14th	Mahanadi	Krishnappa Uppur	Sanjjana, Dileep Raj, Rangayana Raghu, Shobaraj, Lokanath	Drama	Produced by JJ Cine Productions	
J U N	21st	Auto Raja	Uday Prakash	Ganesh, Bhama, Deepika Kamaiah	Drama / Romance	Produced by San City Films	
J U N	21st	Gharbada Gudi	Om Sai Prakash	Anu Prabhakar, Mohan Shankar, Ramesh Bhat, Padmaja Rao, Tennis Krishna	Drama	Produced by Apsara Movies	
J U N	27th	Chandra	Roopa Iyer	Shriya Saran, Prem Kumar, Ganesh Venkatraman, Vivek	Period romance	Produced by India Classic Art; A Kannada – Tamil Bilingual	
J U N	28th	Nam Duniya Nam Style	Preetham Gubbi	Likhith Shetty, Sonia Gowda, Vinayak Joshi, Krishna, Milana Nagaraj, Kavya Shetty	Bromance	Produced by Gubbi Talkies	
J U N	28th	Bidalare Endu Ninna	Umesh Badaradinni	Naveen Krishna, Swathi, Bhumika Chabria, Sadhu Kokila	Horror	Produced by Amma Talkies	
J U N	28th	Cycle	Agni	Agni, Harshika Poonacha, Lahari Velu	Romance	Produced by Gelethana Creations	

=== July – December ===
Opening		Title	Director	Cast	Genre	Notes	Ref
J U L	5th	Chella Pilli	Saikrishna Kudla	Vijay Raghavendra, Aishwarya Nag, Shobharaj, M. S. Umesh, D. V. Sadananda Gowda	Romantic comedy	Produced by Shine City Productions	
J U L	12th	Whistle	Prashant Raj	Chiranjeevi Sarja, Pranitha Subhash, Guruprasad, Chi Guru Dutt	Romantic thriller	Remake of Tamil film Pizza; Produced by Nimma Cinema – Bangalore Brothers	
J U L	12th	Ale	Gopikiran	Tanush, Harshika Poonacha, Aviva Bidappa, Tabla Nani, Ramakrishna	Romance	Produced by KKR Film House	
J U L	12th	Bhairavi	H. S. Rajashekar	Ayesha, Ramesh Bhat, Sathish Ninasam	Action	Produced by Sri Sankeshwara Combines	
J U L	19th	Googly	Pawan Wadeyar	Yash, Kriti Kharbanda, Ananth Nag, Sadhu Kokila	Romance	Produced by Jayanna Films	
J U L	19th	Money Honey Shani	Rajesh Murthy	Monish Nagaraj, Bhavana Rao, RJ Prithvi, Vasu Dixit, Kanchan Ramaprasad	Rom-Com	Produced by Rajesh Murthy	
J U L	26th	Loosegalu	Arun	Sri Murali, Srikanth, Akul Balaji, Rekha Vedavyas, Shravya, Aishwarya Nag	Romantic comedy	Produced by County Film Makers.	
J U L	26th	Mangana Kaiyalli Manikya	Rajendra Karanth	Ramesh Aravind, Harshika Poonacha, Rangayana Raghu, Ravishankar Gowda, Sonia Gowda	Comedy	Produced by Sandesh Nagaraj	
J U L	26th	Teenage	Srikanth	Kishan Shrikanth, Tanvi Lonkar, Priya Bharat Khanna, Apoorva Arora, Jayshree, Master Lakshman	Romance	Produced by Salt N' Pepper Entertainment Limited	
A U G	2nd	Silk Sakkath Hot	Trishul	Veena Malik, Akshay, Srinivasa Murthy	biographical film / Drama	Inspired by Hindi film The Dirty Picture	
A U G	2nd	Case No. 18/9	Mahesh Rao	Niranjan Shetty, Sindhu Lokanath, Shweta Pandit, Rangayana Raghu	Crime thriller	Remake of Tamil film Vazhakku Enn 18/9	
A U G	2nd	Aashirvada	Surya Mohan	Surya Mohan, Disha Poovaiah	Drama		
A U G	9th	Tony	Jayatheertha	Srinagar Kitty, Dileep Raj, Aindrita Ray, Preeti Jhangiani	Thriller	Produced by Sky Studios.	
A U G	9th	I am in Love	Nandakumar	Mahesh, Kavya Shetty, Neha	Romance	Produced by Nakshatra Entertainment	
A U G	15th	Jayammana Maga	Ravikiran Vikas	Duniya Vijay, Bharathi, Rangayana Raghu, Kalyani Raju	Dark fantasy	Produced by Vijay Enterprises and Duniya Talkies	
A U G	16th	Neralu	Vinod Khanadalli	Sanjeev, Akash, Shashikumar, Shruthi Raj, Avinash, Sudha Belawadi, Honnavalli Krishna	Drama	Produced by Atul Kulkarni	
A U G	23rd	Victory	Nanda Kishore	Sharan, Asmita Sood, Tabla Nani, Ravishankar, Sadhu Kokila, Avinash	Comedy	Produced by S.R.S. Media Vision	
A U G	23rd	Nanda Gokula	M. N. Simha Joshi	Rakesh Adiga, Tejaswini Prakash, Bank Janardhan, Ramesh Bhat, Padma Vasanthi	Drama	Remake of Malayalam film Nandanam; Produced by B N Joshi Creations	
A U G	30th	Barfi	Shekar	Diganth, Bhama, Harish Raj, Dileep Raj, Samyuktha Belawadi	Romantic Comedy	Produced by Chathurthi Creators	
A U G	30th	Shatru	JKS	Prem Kumar, Dimple Chopade, Rangayana Raghu, Ramesh Bhat, Bullet Prakash, Tabla Nani	Action; Thriller	Produced by Sri Sai Ram Pictures	
A U G	30th	Mandahasa	Rajesh Nair	Chethan, Rakesh Adiga, Nikki	Romance	Produced by ADVK Motion Picture Company Pvt Ltd.	
S E P	5th	Pyarge Aagbittaite	Kevin Bala	Komal Kumar, Prarthana, Akul Balaji, Tennis Krishna	Romantic comedy	Remake of Marathi film Mumbai-Pune-Mumbai; Produced by Rakshita Films	
S E P	6th	Lucia	Pawan Kumar	Sathish Ninasam, Sruthi Hariharan, Hardhika Shetty, Achyuth Kumar	Drama	Produced by Audience Films & Home Talkies	
S E P	12th	Umesh	Ashok Kumar	Jeetendra Simon, Voila Mathew, Nilopher	biographical film / Drama	Produced by S. M. Cine Creations	
S E P	13th	Appayya	S. Narayan	Srinagar Kitty, Bhama, S. Narayan, Indrakumar	Drama / Romance	Produced by Bhagyavathi Combines	
S E P	20th	Jungle Jackie	Ravi Kadooru	Rajesh, Aishwarya, Bullet Prakash	Drama / Action	Produced by Media House Studio	
S E P	20th	Blue Moon	B. S. Sanjay	Vishnuvardhan, Monisha Chowdhary, Vikram, Sathish	Adult romance	Produced by SPR Productions	
S E P	26th	Brundaavana	K. Madesha	Darshan, Karthika Nair, Milana Nagaraj, Sai Kumar, Sampath Raj	Action drama	Remake of Telugu film Brindavanam; Produced by Sri Seetha Bhairaveshwara Creations	
O C T	4th	Dilwala	Anil Kumar	Sumanth Shailendra, Radhika Pandit, P. Ravi Shankar, Sharath Lohitashwa, Jai Jagadish	Romance	Produced by Shailendra Productions	
O C T	11th	Jatta	Giriraj	Kishore, Sukrutha Wagle, Pavana, B. Suresh	Drama	Produced by Omkar Movies	
O C T	11th	Dasavala	M. S. Ramesh	Prem, Akshara Menon, Rangayana Raghu, Avinash	Drama	Produced by Namana Films	
O C T	11th	Kamini	Ramana	Shobina, Rajeev	Erotic thriller		
O C T	18th	Sakkare	Abhaya Simha	Ganesh, Deepa Sannidhi, Ananth Nag, Anu Prabhakar, Vinaya Prasad	Romantic drama	Produced by Media House Studio	
O C T	25th	Chitramandiradalli	Venkatachala	Shankar Aryan, Namitha Rao	Drama	Produced by Sharvari Communications	
O C T	25th	Dhanu	K. Devu	Santhosh, Kushi, Bullet Prakash, Killer Venkatesh, Petrol Prasanna, Vijanath Biradar	Romance	Produced by Lakshith Arts	
O C T	25th	Case No.18/9 (Re-release)	Mahesh Rao	Niranjan Shetty, Sindhu Lokanath, Shweta Pandit, Rangayana Raghu	Crime thriller	Initial release on 2 August 2013; Remake of Tamil film Vazhakku Enn 18/9	
N O V	1st	Raja Huli	Guru Deshpande	Yash, Meghana Raj, Charan Raj, Harsha	Action	Remake of Tamil film Sundarapandian; Produced by K Manju Films	
N O V	1st	Slum	Mahesh Kumar	Mayur Patel, Disha Poovaiah, Neha Patel, Achyuth Kumar	Drama	Produced by Sagar Films	
N O V	8th	Sweety Nanna Jodi	Vijayalakshmi Singh	Auditya, Radhika Kumaraswamy, Ramya Krishna, Girish Karnad, Jai Jagadish, Umashree, Sadhu Kokila	Romance	Produced by Shamika Enterprises	
N O V	15th	Ambara	Sen Prakash	Yogesh, Bhama, Harish Raj, Sadhu Kokila, Vishwa	Romance	Produced by Aura Cinemas	
N O V	15th	Aantharya	Aney Santhosh Gowda	Praveen, Apsara	Romance	Produced by Sri Lakshmi Ventakeshwara Creations	
N O V	15th	Jeethu	Edwin	Edwin, Rachana Gowda, Vijanath Biradar, Tabla Nani, Dingri Nagaraj	Drama	Produced by Sri Shivalaya Movie Makers	
N O V	22nd	Coffee With My Wife	Vidyasagar	Anish Tejeshwar, Sindhu Lokanath, Kumudha	Romance	Produced by Neha Media Pvt Ltd. A Kannada – Telugu bilingual	
N O V	22nd	Colors in Bangalore	Girish Srivatsa	Girish Srivatsa, Supriya, Upasana, Mimicry Dayanand, Mico Manjunath	Romantic drama	Produced by Studio Line Movies	
N O V	22nd	Khatharnak	Malavalli Saikrishna	Ravi Kale, Roopika, Sharath Lohitashwa, Sadhu Kokila	Crime thriller	Distributed by Jayanna Combines	
N O V	29th	Anubhava (Re-release)	Kashinath	Kashinath, Abhinaya, Umashri, Dinesh	Adult comedy	Initial release in 1984; Produced by Sri Gayatri Productions	
N O V	29th	6 – 5 = 2	Ashok	Pallavi, Tanuja, Darshan, Krishna Prakash, Vijay Chendoor, Mruthyunjay	Horror / Found footage	Produced by Swarnalatha Productions	
N O V	29th	Chaddi Dosth	P. C. Shekar	Sadhu Kokila, Rangayana Raghu, Ashwini Gowda, Roopashree	Comedy	Produced by SRS Media Vision	
N O V	29th	Cool Ganesha	Vasanth	Jaggesh, Tashu Kaushik	Comedy	Produced by Mega Mind Productions	
D E C	6th	Advaitha	B. M. Giriraj	Ajay Rao, Harshika Poonacha	Romantic drama	Produced by Sri Thulajabhavani Arts	
D E C	6th	B3	Ghanshyam	Srikanth, Harshika Poonacha	Romance	Produced by Alliance Pictures	
D E C	6th	Dyavre	Gadda Viji	Yogaraj Bhat, Sathish Ninasam, Sonia Gowda, Sruthi Hariharan	Drama	Produced by Yogaraj Movies and Jayanna Combines	
D E C	6th	Thallana	N. Sudarshan	K. S. Shridar, Nirmala Chennappa, Mamatha	Drama	Produced by Thanmaya Chithra	
D E C	12th	Bhajarangi	Harsha	Shivarajkumar, Aindrita Ray, Tabla Nani, Sadhu Kokila	Action	Produced by Film Entertainer	
D E C	13th	Sri Adi Parashakti	Vemgal Jagannath Rao	Jai Jagadish, Thilak Shekar, Vinaya Prasad	Devotional	Produced by Sri Dhanalakshmi Movies	
D E C	13th	Suri Gang	K. Anbu	Ram, Chayashri	Crime	Produced by Sunlallamma Devi Productions	
D E C	20th	Mugila Chumbana	B. Shankar	Raghuveer, Shravanthi, Shakuntala	Romance	Produced by Manjunath Creations	
D E C	20th	Gaali	Lakshmish (Lucky)	Jeevan, Roopa Nataraj	Romantic comedy	Produced by Lucky Movies	
D E C	20th	Kalavu	B. Ravi	Umashree, Jugari Avinash, Karisubbu	Drama	Presented by Kannada arts	
D E C	27th	Shravani Subramanya	Manju Swaraj	Ganesh, Amoolya, Ananth Nag, Tara	Romance	Produced by Suresh Arts Productions	
D E C	27th	Chatrapathi	Dinesh Gandhi	Siddhanth, Priyadarshini, Bhanupriya	Action	Remake of Telugu film Chatrapathi; Produced by S. S. Combines	

== Deaths ==
Month	Date	Name	Age	Profession	Notable films
February	24	R. G. Vijayasarathy	63	Actor, Critic	Suryavamsha . Kutumba . Gowramma . Chikkamagaloora Chikkamallige . Snehitaru
March	5	Rajasulochana	78	Actress, Dancer	Gunasagari . Bedara Kannappa .
April	14	P. B. Sreenivas	82	Playback singer	Bhakta Kanakadasa . Kasturi Nivasa . Belli Moda . Sharapanjara . Kappu Bilupu . Bangarada Manushya . Naagarahaavu . Gandhada Gudi . Babruvahana . Maanasa Sarovara
May	26	T. M. Soundararajan	90	Playback singer	Gunasagari . Sadarame . Krishnadevaraya
June	23	Kunigal Nagabhushan	68	Actor, screenwriter, Film director	Simhada Jodi . S. P. Sangliyana . Gauri Ganesha . Sahodarara Savaal
June	25	Uma Shivakumar	71	Actress	Vamsha Vriksha . Bara . Baddi Bangaramma . Maduve Madi Nodu . Chandanada Gombe . Maneye Mantralaya
June	30	H. V. Prakash	53	Actor	Ondu Cinema Kathe . Ajagajantara . Keralida Kesari . Shwethagni
July	16	Shringar Nagaraj	74	Cinematographer, Producer, Actor	Pushpaka Vimana . Bangaaradha Manushya . Kesarina Kamala . Katha Sangama . Ranganayaki
July	26	T.S. Narasimhan	86	Producer	Malgudi Days
October	9	Srihari	49	Actor	Ko Ko . Ondagona Baa . O Premave
October	24	Manna Dey	94	Playback singer	Kalpavruksha . Kalavathi . Margadarshi . Sangolli Rayanna
November	3	D. Rajendra Babu	62	director, Writer	Haalunda Thavaru . Annayya . Nandhi . Swaathi Mutthu . Jeevanadhi . Diggajaru . Habba . Olavina Udugore . Jodi Hakki . Encounter Dayanaayak . Auto Shankar . Yaare Neenu Cheluve . Naanu Nanna Hendthi
November	3	Rajesh		Actor, Reality Show Contestant	Jungle Jackie . Love Is Poison . Halli Haida Pyatege Banda . Bigg Boss Kannada
December	10	Sundarnath Suvarna		Cinematographer, director, Producer	Anubhava . Mussanje Maathu . Nammoora Mandara Hoove . Amrutha Varshini . Sri Manjunatha . Tamassu . Chellata . Agni Parva . Tiger Gangu . Nee Nanna Daiva . Kiladi Thaatha . Aarambha . Halliyadarenu Shiva
