= CID Eesha =

- Poster
- Directed by: N. Rajesh Fernandes
- Written by: Rama Narayanan (dialogue)
- Screenplay by: N. Rajesh Fernandes
- Story by: Rama Narayanan (Note: Although the film is a remake, Rama Narayanan takes credit for the story.)
- Based on: CID Moosa (2003)
- Produced by: C. Umakantha Raju
- Starring: Jaggesh; Dala
- Cinematography: Ramesh Babu
- Edited by: Shyam
- Music by: Vijaya Bharathi
- Production company: Sri Uma Maheshwari Creations
- Release date: 22 March 2013
- Running time: 127 minutes
- Country: India
- Language: Kannada

CID Eesha is a 2013 Indian Kannada-language action comedy film directed by N. Rajesh Fernandes. A remake of the Malayalam film C.I.D. Moosa (2003), the film stars Jaggesh and a Labrador named Dala with Mayuri, Komal, Rangayana Raghu, Avinash and Srinivasa Murthy in supporting roles. The title of the film is an acronym of Eerenahalli Shankaregowda, the name of the detective agency that Jaggesh's character Shankar owns.

The film was in the making for five years due to technical problems. The film was released on 22 March 2013 alongside Ziddi and Nenapinangala. It was a box office failure.

== Cast ==
- Jaggesh as Shankar
- Dala
- Mayuri
- Komal
- Rangayana Raghu as Narasimha
- Avinash as Police officer
- Chidanand
- Bank Janardhan
- R. N. Sudarshan
- Harish Roy
- Srinivasa Murthy as Rangaswamy
- Lakshman
- Ninasam Ashwath
- Killer Venkatesh
- Jayalakshmi

== Production ==
A Labrador named Dala, who featured in the film, died a month after the film's shooting in 2008. Dala's owner Roy donated ₹20 lakhs to the film's producer in 2010 since the film ran out of budget.

== Soundtrack ==
The music was composed by Vijaya Bharathi. The song "Jamesbondin Ditto" from the original was reused as "James Bondigintha" with the same singer. The song "Kuhu Kuhu Kogile" is based on "Kick Eruthe" from Tamil film Padayappa (1999).

CID Eesha

Soundtrack album by Vijaya Bharathi
- Released: 2013
- Recorded: 2008
- Genre: Feature film soundtrack
- Length: 20:08
- Language: Kannada

Official audio
- CID Eesha - Full Album on YouTube

Track listing
No.	Title	Singer(s)	Length
1.	"James Bondigintha"	Karthik	4:10
2.	"Kuhoo Kuhoo Kogile"	Rajesh Krishnan, Nanditha	4:21
3.	"Don't Worry Don't Worry"	Mukesh	3:53
4.	"Ivanu Yaaru"	Rajesh Krishnan	3:46
5.	"Oorige Oore"	Sriram Parthasarathy, Sangeetha	3:58
Total length:			20:08

== Reception ==
=== Critical response ===
A critic from The Times of India gave the film a rating of three out of five stars and wrote that "It’s Jaggesh’s show throughout. He has carried the story forward with catchy dialogues, good expressions and body language. Director N Rajesh could have a better job by cutting unnecessary sequences which we had seen years ago. There is nothing new in narration or the script". A critic from Bangalore Mirror wrote that "On the whole, you can watch the movie once, provided you strongly believe in the fact that there is no logic but only masti (transl. fun)". A critic from Chitraloka wrote tha "The film is an out and out slap stick film with no logic. Jaggesh carries the film entirely on his shoulders and he is the only reason for the audience to watch the film".
