= Lambodara (film) =

2019 Indian Kannada language film

- Official poster
- Directed by: K. Krishnaraj
- Written by: Sailesh
- Produced by: Visheshwar P. Raghavendra Bhat
- Starring: Yogesh; Akanksha
- Cinematography: Arvind S. Kashyap
- Music by: Midhun Mukundan
- Production company: Vrishank Movie Maker's
- Release date: 11 January 2019
- Country: India
- Language: Kannada

Lambodara is a 2019 Indian Kannada-language romantic comedy directed by K Krishnaraj and starring Yogesh and Akanksha.

== Cast ==
- Yogesh as Lambodara
- Akanksha Gandhi as Nithya
- Dharmanna as Kedarnath
- Siddu Moolimani as Dubsmash Danny
- Achyuth Kumar as Lambodara's father
- Aruna Balraj as Lambodara's mother

== Production ==
K Krishnaraj worked as an assistant director for Kalaya Tasmai Namaha (2012). He worked on this film for two to three years. Yogesh worked on the film for one-and-a-half years.

== Soundtrack ==
The music was composed by Karthik Sharma.

- "Kedi Ivanu" - Vaikom Vijayalakshmi
- "Geleya" (lyrics by Jayanth Kaikini)
- "Oh Manase Manase"

== Reception ==
A critic from The New Indian Express wrote that "Lambodara will just be added to the long list of films where he [Yogesh] fails to impress the audience". A critic from The News Minute opined that "Watch it if you can enjoy clichéd, lengthy films with a joke here and there". A critic from The Times of India stated that "Lambodara offers nothing much to keep you interested".
