= Dasavala =

- Directed by: M. S. Ramesh
- Written by: Ma. Chandru
- Screenplay by: Ma. Chandru
- Produced by: Anaji Nagaraj
- Starring: Prem; Iswarya Menon; Hema Choudhary
- Cinematography: Dasari Seenu
- Music by: Gurukiran
- Production company: Namana Films
- Release date: 11 October 2013
- Country: India
- Language: Kannada
- Budget: ₹40 million (US$470,000)

Dasavala is a 2013 Kannada drama film starring Prem and Iswarya Menon. The film is directed by M. S. Ramesh, and also stars Hema Choudhary, Rangayana Raghu and Avinash. Dasavala was released on 11 October 2013. Anitha Bhat featured in an item song in Dasavala. The storyline of the movie was similar to two more Kannada movies – Director's Special and Karodpathi. It was also reported that the concept of all these films could be traced back to the 1996 Spanish film Familia in which a lonely rich man hires actors to act as his family members on his birthday.

== Plot ==
Dasavala is about two tourist guides – Prem and Rangayana Raghu. The jolly guides face a peculiar situation when a handicapped artist, a singer, a girl who escapes from the clutches of prostitution, a lady who leaves her home after a tiff with her son, and another girl, who also runs away from her house not being able to accept the groom selected by her parents, land in their house. Each one of them has some sentimental story which reflects the present day society. As the story progresses, the plot unfolds and each one of them are back in their own house. But the main character Aishwarya (Aishwarya Menon) decides to stay with Prem and he had to fight with her groom to save her.

== Cast ==
- Prem as Sathya
- Iswarya Menon as Aishwarya
- Rangayana Raghu as Ranga
- Avinash
- Hema Chaudhary
- Achyuth Kumar
- Shobhraj
- Pushpa Swamy
- Sanchari Vijay
- Anitha Bhat in an item song

== Filming ==
Dasavala was shot in and around tourist attractions of Karnataka like Badami, Aihole and Pattadakal. The song-recording muhurat of Dasavala was organised in March 2013, but the actual shoot of the film started on 22 May 2013. A special set of a Dhaba was erected at the Kanteerava Studios in September 2013, to shoot an item song featuring Ankitha Bhatt. Dance Master Tribhuvan choreographed the song, composed by music director Gurukiran. The audio release of the Dasavala was done by former Karnataka Chief Minister B. S. Yeddyurappa and Puneeth Rajkumar in an event held at the 37th Crescent Hotel on 14 September 2013.

== Soundtrack ==
The Music Was Composed By Gurukiran and Released by Anand Audio Video.

Dasavala

Soundtrack album by Gurukiran
- Released: 20 Oct 2013
- Recorded: 2013
- Genre: Soundtrack
- Length: 21:09
- Label: Anand Audio Video
- Producer: Gurukiran

Gurukiran chronology
| Charminar (2013) | Dasavala (2013) | Brahma (2014) |

Track list
| No. | Title | Lyrics | Singer(s) | Length |
|---|---|---|---|---|
| 1. | "Bandaglu Beththale" | Kaviraj | V. Harikrishna, Raj Guru, Shamitha Malnad, Anuradha Bhat | 3:59 |
| 2. | "Ondu Eradu Mooru" | Santosh Naik | Udit Narayan, Anuradha Bhat | 4:33 |
| 3. | "Naayi Banduddappa" | Purandara Dasa | Picchalli Srinivas | 2:18 |
| 4. | "Hegideeya" | Kaviraj | Gurukiran, Anupama | 3:31 |
| 5. | "Rokka Eradakku" | Purandara Dasa | Shankar Shanbag | 2:08 |
| 6. | "Ooikko Ooikko" | V. Nagendra Prasad | Hemanth, Santosh, Akanksha Badami | 4:40 |
| Total length: | | | | 21:09 |

== Critical reception ==
Dasavala received positive reviews from the Times of India, Bangalore Mirror and other trade magazines. The Times of India gave it 3 out of 5 stars and stated that the director presented Dasavala in a humorous way and many incidents that are in focus may be happening in many households.

== See also ==
- List of Kannada films of 2013
