= Chathikkatha Chanthu =

- Theatrical release poster
- Directed by: Rafi Mecartin
- Written by: Rafi Mecartin
- Produced by: Lal
- Starring: Jayasurya; Navya Nair; Bhavana; Vineeth; Lal
- Cinematography: Saloo George
- Edited by: Hariharaputhran
- Music by: Alex Paul (songs); Berny-Ignatius (score)
- Production company: Lal Creations
- Distributed by: Lal Release
- Release date: 14 April 2004
- Running time: 130 minutes
- Country: India
- Language: Malayalam

Chathikkatha Chanthu (transl. Chanthu Who Does Not Cheat) is a 2004 Indian Malayalam-language romantic comedy film written and directed by Rafi Mecartin and produced by Lal under the banner of Lal Creations. It stars Jayasurya in the title role, along with Vineeth, Lal, Navya Nair, and Bhavana in other major roles. The film features original songs composed by Alex Paul, while Berny-Ignatius did the scoring. In the film, to spurn his landlord's daughter Indira, Chanthu writes love letters to an imaginary Vasumathi. However, things go awry when the letters reach a real Vasumathi, and she falls for him.

The film was released on 14 April 2004 and has a cult status in Malayalam Cinema. It was remade in Kannada as Kal Manja (2011).

== Plot ==
Chanthu is a young screenwriter whose mother works in a mansion owned by a man named Thampuran. Thampuran's daughter Indira is in love with Chanthu, who does not love her. After finding out about this, Thampuram forces Chanthu to write love letters to "Vasumathi," an imaginary woman from the fictional "Thottakkattukara" village, and makes sure Indira stumbles upon them. However, unknown to everyone, a real Vasumathi (nicknamed "Suma") exists in a real Thottakkattukara village, where she is about to commit suicide. Upon receiving the letters, Vasumathi begins to expect a savior and starts looking for information about Chanthu. Through the direction of the letters, Vasumathi awaits a departing Chanthu on a bus trip to Madras.

At the bus station, Vasumathi explains her story to dance choreographer Krishnan and several others before Chanthu arrives. During the journey, Vasumathi tries to impress Chanthu, who does not realize who she really is. At Madras, Vasumathi introduces herself as Suma to Chanthu.

Krishnan introduces Chanthu and Vasumathi to his crew's director, Harikrishnan, who allows Chanthu to unfurl his new script. Chanthu opens his own tale to the director and adds that Vasumathi comes out of the home believing those letters. But the director does not accept it, saying that no girl would trust such letters and flee from home like he said, unless she has a strong reason. Seeing the dilemma that Chanthu is facing, Vasumathi helps him and reveals her own origins: she was born in a rich family and was the sole heir of their wealth. One day, her mother Ambika died falling into a well, and Vasumathi's grandmother later died in her sleep, and fingers point to Vasumathi, who was present during those incidents. That, along with her refusal to marry her cousin Aravindan, led Vasumathi to be "exorcised" by a fake Hindu priest. The torture inflicted on Vasumathi, along with her supposed guilt over the recent deaths, is what almost drove her to commit suicide until she received Chanthu's letters. Unknown to Vasumathi, her relatives, led by her uncle Ramu, coveted her inheritance and hired the priest to torture her into committing suicide. Vasumathi's grandfather is the only one in the family who sympathizes with her plight, but he, too, is manipulated into believing that Vasumathi is possessed. The director likes the story and appoints Chanthu as the screenwriter, with Vasumathi joining in to help him.

Later, Krishnan tells the director what is going on, and they try to unite Chanthu and Vasumathi. When Vasumathi decides to show Chanthu the letters, Indira appears, having recently learned about what Thampuran did. Chanthu asks her to leave, but Indira decides to stay in Madras. Days later, Aravindan lures Vasumathi back to Thottakkattukara (per Ramu's orders). Krishnan later reveals the truth about Vasumathi to Chanthu and Indira. Chanthu tries to save Vasumathi from her family, but Aravindan manhandles and sends him back to Madras in disgrace.

Deciding to rectify his mistakes, Chanthu rewrites the script to save Vasumathi. He and the film crew reach the home of Vasumathi's family and scare them using visual effects. They reach Vasumathi and tend to her. Vasumathi's relatives call in the priest to torture Vasumathi again. However, with the film crew's help, Vasumathi burns the priest's beard, and they terrify him with more special effects, making him leave for good. Meanwhile, a remorseful Thampuran arrives to make amends with Chanthu and Indira upon learning what had transpired.

Eventually, the relatives learn that they were tricked. Ramu orders the relatives and their thugs to murder Chanthu and the film crew while he confronts Vasumathi. During the ensuing fight, Ramu admits that it was he who committed the murders to frame Vasumathi. Just as Ramu intends to murder Vasumathi with a sword, Vasumathi's grandfather appears and kills Ramu, having overheard everything Ramu said. Vasumathi reconciles with her grandfather.

With the family's plot exposed, the criminals are arrested. Vasumathi's grandfather entrusts Chanthu and the film crew to take care of her before he is also arrested for killing Ramu. The film crew later makes a movie based on the events, and it is revealed that Chanthu (now a successful screenwriter) married Vasumathi while Indira married Krishnan.

== Cast ==
- Jayasurya as Chandu
- Navya Nair in a dual role as:
  - Vasumathi aka Suma
  - Ambika, Vasumathi's mother (cameo)
- Bhavana as Indira
- Vineeth as Krishnan (Kichu)
- Lal as Harikrishnan, the film director
- Salim Kumar as Dance Master Vikram (Michael Alias Jackson Alias Vikram Alias)
- Vinayakan as Romeo
- Cochin Haneefa as Karim
- Madhu as Mahendran, Vasumathi's grandfather
- Siddique as Ramu, one of Vasumathi's uncles
- Janardhanan as Thampuran, Indira's father
- Kulappulli Leela as Chandu's mother
- Krishnakumar as Aravindan
- Indrans as Pappan
- Jagathy Sreekumar as fake priest
- T. P. Madhavan as Sathyan, one of Vasumathi's uncles
- Machan Varghese as Salim
- Kochu Preman as Balan, Palace secretary
- Narayanankutty as Bharathan, bus conductor
- Ramu as Jagannathan, one of Vasumathi's uncles
- Mafia Sasi as Stephen, stunt master
- Captain Raju as Kunjachan, film producer
- Bindu Ramakrishnan as Vasumathi's grandmother
- Ponnamma Babu as one of Vasumathi's aunts
- Manka Mahesh as one of Vasumathi's aunts
- Poornima Anand as one of Vasumathi's aunts
- Maya Viswanath as Vasumathi's friend
- Nandana as Vandana, an actress
- Bindu Panicker as Renuka (Cameo Appearance)

== Production ==
=== Casting ===
The initial script by Rafi–Mecartin followed a girl who mistakenly gets a love letter and goes out to find the man who sent her the letter. It was later that the character of Chandu, who aspires to be a filmmaker, was added in. The title of the film and the name of the protagonist is taken from the 1989 classic Oru Vadakkan Veeragatha, in which the character of Chanthu is known by the sobriquet of Chathiyan Chandu (literally 'Chandu the Betrayer'). The role of Chanthu was first offered to Dileep, who initially accepted the role but later walked out of the project for unknown reasons. The film was produced and distributed by Lal Creations. The cinematography was done by Saloo George, while editing was done by Harihara Puthran.

=== Filming ===
The first scene of the film was shot in Varikkasseri Mana, a traditional aristocratic Namboothiri family house. According to Mecartin, the location was chosen because of its view and the nature that surrounds the place. The bus stand scene where Vasumathi waits for Chanthu is not a real bus stand and is a set made in the Jawaharlal Nehru Stadium. Despite most of the film taking place in Chennai, most of the scenes were shot in Ernakulam. Only a few scenes were shot in Chennai. The house in which Chandu lives is an old Victorian styled house situated in Ernakulam. Some parts of the song Kakkothikkavile was filmed in front of this Victorian house. The scenes which required the interior of the house were shot in Navodaya Studios. The song Hossaina Hossaina was also shot in Navodaya Studios. For the climax of the film, the directors wanted an old palace. However, they could not get one. But, they managed to rent an abandoned building called Silversand, which used to be a hotel. The climax scenes featured a set that consisted of ghosts and supernatural entities. These ghost costumes were inspired by the fancy dress competitions conducted at the Cochin Carnival.

== Music ==
The film's soundtrack is composed by debutant Alex Paul. Lyrics are penned by Gireesh Puthenchery and Santhosh Varma.

No.	Title	Artist(s)	Length
1.	"Hossaina Hossaina"	Afsal, Sujatha Mohan	4:25
2.	"Kakothi Kavile"	M. G. Sreekumar, Vidhu Prathap	4:41
3.	"Love Letter"	Balu	3:55
4.	"Love Letter"	Jyotsna	3:59
5.	"Mazhameettum"	Jyotsna, Balu	5:25
6.	"Minnaminunge"	Dr. Fahad	3:41
7.	"Minnaminunge"	Rimi Tomy	3:48

== Reception ==
=== Box office ===
The film was a commercial success at the box office, and was declared a super hit at the box office. The film was the fifth highest-grossing Malayalam film of the year.

=== Critical response ===
Upon release, the film received mixed reviews. Sify gave the film a "Disappointing" verdict and wrote: "Jayasurya lacks screen presence and the characterisation has let him down badly. Most of the comedy meant to evoke laughter falls flat as a comedy battalion strives hard. Vineeth after a break is back and he gives an impressive performance. Navya and Bhavana are wasted. Songs tune by debutante Alex Paul are disappointing and on the whole Chanthikatha Chanthu takes audience for a big royal ride."

Despite receiving mixed reviews from critics, audience reception was more positive. The soundtrack also became popular and was a chartbuster upon its release.

== Legacy ==
The film has, over the years, attained a cult status in Kerala through internet trolls and memes. The character played by Salim Kumar, Dance master Vikram, has been subject to many memes over the years.

== Remake ==
The film was remake in Kannada as Kal Manja (2011) starring Komal Kumar.
