= Chella Pilli =

- Official poster
- Directed by: Sai Krishna
- Produced by: Sudesh Bhandary
- Starring: Vijay Raghavendra; Aishwarya Nag
- Music by: Mikku Kavil
- Release date: 5 July 2013
- Country: India
- Language: Kannada

Chella Pilli is a 2013 Indian Kannada-language action drama film directed by Saikrishna Kudla and starring Vijay Raghavendra and Aishwarya Nag. The film released on 5 July 2013, and ran in a Mangalore theatre for twenty five days.

== Cast ==
- Vijay Raghavendra as Hemanth
- Aishwarya Nag as Diya
- Shobharaj as a police officer
- Sadananda Gowda as the chief minister
- Naveen D. Padil
- Bhojaraj Vamanjoor
- Aravind Bolar
- Sathish Bandale
- Thimmappa Kulal
- Sundar Rai Mandara
- Jayaram Acharya
- Santhosh Shetty
- Ashok Shetty

== Production ==
The film began production in September 2012 and was released after Vijay Raghavendra's stint with Bigg Boss Kannada.

== Soundtrack ==
The music was composed by Mikku Kavil.

All lyrics are written by Manju Karwara.

Track listing
No.	Title	Singer(s)	Length
1.	"Usireega Marethanthe"	Anuradha Bhat, Nakul Abhyankar	5:31
2.	"Nan Hudugi"	Anuradha Bhat, Nakul Abhyankar	4:25
3.	"Kutti Shakeela"	Chintan Vikas, Malathi, Shamitha Malnad	4:53
4.	"Paperru"	Jassie Gift	4:45
Total length:			19:34

== Reception ==
A critic from The Times of India wrote that "The director does not impress you either with the script or the narration. The movie neither conveys a message nor entertains you". A critic from Deccan Herald wrote that "This Chella pilli is sure to leave most of the audience scatter-brained!"
