= Darling (2014 film) =

- Release poster
- Directed by: Santhosh
- Written by: Manju Mandavya
- Screenplay by: Santhosh
- Produced by: Santhosh; Arjun Janya; Yogesh; M. Manjunath Naik
- Starring: Yogesh; Muktha
- Cinematography: Manjunath B. Nayak
- Edited by: K. M. Prakash
- Music by: Arjun Janya
- Production companies: Samy Associates; S Team Productions
- Release date: 31 January 2014
- Country: India
- Language: Kannada

Darling is a 2014 Indian Kannada-language romantic action comedy film directed by Santhosh and starring Yogesh and Muktha.

== Cast ==
- Yogesh as Sathya
- Muktha George as Poorni
- Ninasam Ashwath as Bhavani, the don
- Adi Lokesh as Gubbi
- Chikkanna
- Rajendra Karanth as MLA

== Production ==
Much of the crew from except the producer and actress were retained from Alemari (2012). Yogesh plays a tattoo artist in the film. Bhanu made her Kannada debut with this film.

== Soundtrack ==
The songs are composed by Arjun Janya. Santhu wrote the lyrics for all of the songs. In a music review of the film, a critic wrote that "The album of Darling — said to highlight a local love story — is as local and in your face as you can expect it to be".

- "Dabba Song" - Kailash Kher, Shamita Malnad
- "Darling Darling" - Mika Singh
- "Kaichachu" - Karthik, Archana Ravi
- "Kanna Neeru" - Nakul, Anuradha Bhat
- "Nannu Swalpa Loose" - Arjun Janya

== Reception ==
A critic from Bangalore Mirror called the film Yogesh's "best film in the last couple of years". A critic from The Times of India wrote that "Though the story is not so strong, Santhu, with a good script, has made it interesting with some curious turns and lively moments". A critic from Chitraloka wrote that "Darling is not a great film in many respects. But if you have enjoyed the best of Yogish's films you will find that there is more to this extremely thin actor you will want to see".

== Box office ==
The film had a moderate box office run. Darling was made with a production budget of Rs 6 crore, and the movie collected Rs 2 crore at the box office. The movie's Times of India rating is 2.9/5.
