= Kalaya Tasmai Namaha =

2012 Indian Kannada-language crime drama

- Directed by: Chandrashekar Shrivastav
- Written by: Chandrashekar Shrivastav
- Produced by: Maruthi JD
- Starring: Yogesh; Madhubala
- Cinematography: Cinetech Suri
- Edited by: S. Sounder Rajan
- Music by: A. M. Neel
- Production company: Maruthi Enterprises
- Distributed by: Arya Mourya Enterprises
- Release date: 12 October 2012
- Country: India
- Language: Kannada

Kalaya Tasmai Namaha is a 2012 Indian Kannada crime drama movie directed and written by Chandrashekar Shrivastav. The film stars Yogesh and debutante Madhubala in the lead roles. Snake Shyam makes a special appearance in a song sequence. The music is composed by A. M. Neel.

== Plot ==
The story revolves around a man who is a serial Supari killer and his love interest played by Madhubala.

== Cast ==
- Yogesh as Tukaram aka Ten
- Madhubala as Madhu
- Snake Shyam in a special appearance
- Rangayana Raghu
- Ravi Kale
- Raju Talikote
- Shanker Ashwath

== Production ==
Director Chandrashekar, after a brief gap from his previous film, Patre Loves Padma, approached Yogesh with a different screenplay oriented script and soon after roped in him in the lead role. Yogesh plays a Supari serial killer and lead actress Madhubala plays a homely girl character.

=== Filming ===
The film is shot in central cities such as Bangalore, Mysore and Haasan. For songs, the unit has shot at Jaipur locales. The filming officially begun on 5 August 2011 and Duniya Vijay and Bhavana attended the inaugural event to wish the team.

== Soundtrack ==
Kalaya Tasmai Namaha

Soundtrack album by A. M. Neel
- Released: July 2012
- Genre: Feature film soundtrack

A. M. Neel composed 7 songs to the lyrics of director Chandrashekar Shrivastav.

No.	Title	Singer(s)	Length
1.	"Kaali Roadu"	Yogesh
2.	"Naanenu Alla"	Sunidhi Chauhan, Vardhan
3.	"Haalaythu"	Ritheesha Padmanabh, Sujay
4.	"Ninna Naanu"	Anuradha Bhat, Neel
5.	"Preethi Andare"	Kailash Kher
6.	"Ondu Eradu Preethiya"	Tippu
7.	"Preethi Yako"	Kailash Kher

== Reception ==
=== Critical response ===
A critic from The Times of India scored the film at 3 out of 5 stars and says "Full marks to Yogish not only for his excellent acting, but also for singing a song in Kolaveri tune. Madhubala makes an impressive debut with good dialogue delivery. Rangayana Raghu excels as don". A Sharadhaa from The New Indian Express wrote "The verdict: 'Kalaya Tasmai Namaha' means salutations to that great entity called time. The audience would bow to time, provided there was more meat to the film". A critic from Rediff.com scored the film at 2.5 out of 5 stars and says "Yogish has played his role well but it is debutante Madhubala who walks away with all the acting honours by playing the innocent girl so perfectly. Rangayana Raghu is seen differently. Suri's cinematography and A M Neel's music are good. Though the narration is quite slow, the film is engaging and a good attempt". A critic from Bangalore Mirror wrote "The wide-angles of the camera would have been great, if it was not just two locations; a railway bridge and Hesarghatta plains, that made up three-fourths of the film. As the common film wisdom goes, anyone can direct a film, but not everyone can become a story-teller".

== Awards ==
Ceremony	Category	Nominee	Result
2nd South Indian International Movie Awards	Best Actor in a Negative Role	Ravi Khale	Nominated
