= Vasundhara (film) =

- Directed by: T. S. Nagabharana
- Written by: T.S. Nagabharana; Lakshmipathi Kolar
- Produced by: R. Nanjappa; Naginibharana
- Starring: Aishwarya Nag; Rajesh; Avinash Jugari; Jayanthi; T. S. Nagabharana
- Cinematography: Ananth Urs
- Edited by: Ravi Aradhya
- Music by: Stephan Prayog
- Production company: Shruthalaya Productions
- Release date: 31 January 2014
- Country: India
- Language: Kannada

Vasundhara (Kannada: ವಸುಂಧರ) is a 2014 Kannada thriller/drama film directed by T.S. Nagabharana. The name refers to Mother Earth and its role as life giver, protector, preserver and absolver of all sins of all forms of life, and the embodiment of patience and tolerance.

== Synopsis ==
The film revolves around the trials and tribulations of Vasundhara aka Mrs. Bagatov who is inadvertently caught in the cauldron of terrorist violence, communal frenzy, corporate greediness, corrupt bureaucracy and media manipulations. In the process it also unravels the positive power of the media, the uncompromising commitment to distinguish between right and wrong in the face of great suffering and the need for empowerment of women in the interest of the future of our society.

== Cast ==
- Rajesh
- Aishwarya Nag as Vasundhara
- Avinash Jugari
- Jayanthi
- T. S. Nagabharana
- Ashok Rao
- Sudharani
- Dharma as Afroz Pasha
- Rajshri Ponnappa
- Bharath Kalyan as Arun Chawla
- Pannaga Bharana
- Nagini Bharana
- Shrutha Bharana
- M.K. Uppinangadi
- Suryodhaya
- Sriphathi Manjanbail
- Girish Jatti
- Niranjan
- Ramesh Babu
- Harish Ninasam
- Baby Saanavi Bharana

== Production ==
The production commenced on 23 May 2013 and was wrapped up on 10 July 2013

== Soundtrack ==
Vasundhara

Soundtrack album by Stephen Prayog
- Released: 9 January 2014
- Genre: Feature film soundtrack
- Label: Ashwini Audio

The film's soundtrack is composed by Stephen Prayog. The lyrics were penned by Gopal Vajapeyee, Lakshmpathi Kolar, and Vasuki Vaibhav. The soundtrack was launched on 9 January 2014. It is being distributed by Ashwini Audio. The entire soundtrack album can be purchased from Hungama Digital Media Entertainment

Track List
No.	Title	Lyrics	Singer(s)	Length
1.	"Gananayaka"	Gopal Wajapeyeyi	Lakshmi Vijay, Vijay Urs, Srinivas & Vaibhav	4:34
2.	"Kanasella Neene (Are Are)"	Vasuki Vaibhava	Rajesh Krishnan, Archana Ravi & Stephen Prayog	4:42
3.	"Dumtaka Dumtaka"	Gopal wajapeyeyi	Stephen Prayog, Vasuki Vaibhava, Sujatha Prasad, Kushala, Lakshmi Vijay, Archana Ravi, Dakshayani & Rekha Mohan	4:01
4.	"Ello Doora"	Lakshmpathi Kolara	Hemanth	4:51

== Release ==
Vasundhara released in theaters on January 31, 2014.
