= Jaathre =

- Audio cover
- Directed by: Raviteja Mudigere
- Screenplay by: Raviteja Mudigere
- Story by: Raviteja Mudigere
- Produced by: Srikant Mohan Bawale; K. Ramaswamy
- Starring: Chetan Chandra; Aishwarya Nag
- Cinematography: J. S. Wali
- Edited by: K. M. Prakaash
- Music by: Manikanth Kadri
- Production companies: Shukti Cine Productions; URC Movies
- Distributed by: M N Kumar
- Release date: 11 December 2015
- Country: India
- Language: Kannada

Jaathre is a 2015 Indian Kannada language drama film directed by Raviteja. It stars Chetan Chandra and Aishwarya Nag in the lead roles. The supporting cast features Ramesh Bhat, Usha Bhandary and Mitra.

== Cast ==
- Chetan Chandra
- Aishwarya Nag
- Ramesh Bhat
- Usha Bhandary
- Mithra
- Shobaraj
- Master Anand
- Master Aashwick
- Akshay
- Veena Ponnappa
- Shravanth
- Sanathini
- Rakshit Shetty in a cameo appearance

== Soundtrack ==
Jaathre

Soundtrack album by Manikanth Kadri
- Released: 31 July 2015
- Genre: Feature film soundtrack
- Length: 16:45
- Label: Anand Audio

Manikanth Kadri of Savaari Fame has got new singers to sing for the soundtracks in the album and has composed the music for the soundtracks as well as the background score of the movie. The soundtrack features tracks sung by actor Puneeth Rajkumar along with Supriya Lohith, Santhosh Venky, Yazin Nizar and well established Karthik. The album consists of four tracks. It was released on 31 July 2015, in Bangalore.

Track listing
No.	Title	Lyrics	Singer(s)	Length
1.	"Tarikere"	V. Nagendra Prasad	Puneeth Rajkumar, Supriya Lohith	3:46
2.	"Jeene Laga"	Jayant Kaikini	Karthik	3:53
3.	"Maya Jinke"	Raviteja Mudigere	Santhosh Venky, Anuradha Bhat	4:28
4.	"Neenillada"	Hruday Shiva	Yazin Nizar	4:38
Total length:				16:45

Deccan Music Review and Rankings placed the track "Jeene Laga" and "Neenillada" as No.1 and No.2 tracks respectively. The track "Jeene Laga" was well received. The Hindu wrote, "The tune is easy-on-the-ears, with Bollywoodish Hindi phrases and a whiff of Latino strewn around. This is the kind of song that singer Karthik can sing incredibly well... in his sleep, and he lifts the song to new heights with his vocals."
