= Punda (film) =

- Directed by: Yaaruku Therium
- Written by: Idhu Thuparrivalan Per Kanniyan Pongundran
- Based on: Polladhavan (Tamil)
- Produced by: Iniyan Apoorva Swamy; Suresh Chowdhary
- Starring: Yogesh; Meghana Raj; Sharath Lohitashwa
- Cinematography: Shekar Chandra
- Edited by: K. M. Prakash
- Music by: G. V. Prakash Kumar
- Production company: Super Good Combines
- Release date: 18 June 2010
- Running time: 143 minutes
- Country: India
- Language: Kannada

Punda (English:Naughty) is a 2010 Indian Kannada language action thriller film directed by Sivashangkar Mohan. It stars Yogesh and Meghana Raj, making her Kannada debut, in prominent roles. The film is produced by R. B. Choudary's Super Good Combines and the music was composed by G. V. Prakash Kumar. It is a remake of the Tamil film Polladhavan which starred Dhanush and Ramya in the lead roles.

== Plot ==
Yogi, an unemployed man, buys a Bajaj Pulsar bike and ultimately gets attached to it. Yogi's bike gets stolen by a thief who works for Bhoja's brother, Shiva, who is a goon. Yogi hands over the culprit to the police but couldn't find his bike. He clashes with Shiva who stole his bike and is transporting drugs in it. How Yogi saves his family from Shiva and retrieves his bike forms the rest of the story.

== Cast ==
- Yogesh as Yogi
- Meghana Raj as Megha
- Avinash as Yogi's father
- Petrol Prasanna as Shiva
- Sharath Lohitashwa as Bhoja, Shiva's elder brother
- Thulasi as Yogi's mother
- Asharani as Bhoja's wife
- Mohan Juneja as a man at the bar

== Soundtrack ==
Most of the film's songs are composed and scored by G. V. Prakash Kumar. The songs, except "Pakkadmane Hudugana", were reused from the original.

Song title	Singer(s)	Lyrics
"Omomme Edurade"	Kunal Ganjawala, Nandini	V. Nagendra Prasad
"Ishtu Sanna Bottlenalli"	Hemanth Kumar	Kaviraj
"Pakkadmane Hudugana" (composed by Mathews Manu)	Kailash Kher, Usha	Mathews Manu
"Yaako Dil"	Shamitha Malnad, Mohammed Aslam	V. Nagendra Prasad
"Naa Mangalooru Meenu"	Suchitra	V. Nagendra Prasad

== Reception ==
A critic from The Times of India scored the film at 2.5 out of 5 stars and wrote "H Vasu could have done a better job with a better narration which seems loose in the first half. Shruti Indira Lakshminarayana of Rediff scored the film at 2.5 out of 5 stars and wrote "Punda is a time pass watch for Yogish's fans who haven't seen Polladhavan". BSS from Deccan Herald wrote "In the end, “Punda” will definitely endear himself to Yogesh fans". A critic from Bangalore Mirror wrote "The credit for Punda being a good watch should go to the original makers. Despite some blood sport, Punda is worth a watch".
