= Rajadhani (2011 film) =

2011 Indian film by Raghu Jaya & Sowmya Sathyan NR

- Film poster
- Directed by: Raghu Jaya.
- Screenplay by: Pavan Ranadheera
- Story by: K. V. Raju
- Produced by: Sowmya Sathyan N. R.
- Starring: Yash; Chetan Chandra; Prakash Raj; Sheena Shahabadi; Umashree
- Cinematography: H. C. Venugopal
- Edited by: K. M. Prakash
- Music by: Arjun Janya
- Production company: Sri Deviramma Enterprises
- Distributed by: Nishkala Enterprises
- Release date: 3 June 2011
- Running time: 133 minutes
- Country: India
- Language: Kannada

Rajadhani is a 2011 Indian Kannada action crime film directed by debutante Sowmya Sathyan N. R., starring Yash, Prakash Raj, Chetan Chandra, Sathya It also stars Umashree and Sheena Shahabadi, a Mumbai-based model-turned-actress.

The movie highlights how youths tend to lose their way in society due to wrong parenting and support of corrupt government officials. As a consequence, their contribution to society becomes negative.

== Plot ==
Raja, Jaggu, Dhamu, Nithya, and Vinay are unemployed and good-for-nothings. All of them belong to middle and lower-middle-class families, yet nobody seems to take up their families' responsibilities. One day, all of them get into a petty fight, and Inspector Ajay takes them into custody. This is seen by Soumya, Raja's lover, who was coming to his house with her father to discuss their marriage. She immediately tells her father to return home.

One day, contractor Manohar meets them in a bar and offers them a contract of Rs. 50,00,000 to kill Benki Mahadeva. Except Vinay, the rest kill Mahadeva. Upon knowing that Mahadeva is a big rowdy of Bangalore, with the help of Bhatta, all of them apply for bail. Being money-driven and gaining some political support, they slowly commit more and more crimes. Meanwhile, Soumya happily marries someone else.

In due course, Jaggu and Nithya die when being attacked by their opposite gang. In the end, it is revealed that Vinay joined Raja's gang as Ajay's secret informant. Ajay shoots both Raja and Dhamu. Their families refuse to identify them as their sons, owing to the humiliation and problems they have caused them.

== Cast ==
- Yash as Raja
- Prakash Raj as Inspector Ajay
- Sheena Shahabadi as Soumya
- Chetan Chandra as Chetan
- Sathya as Jaggu
- Ravi Teja as Dhamu
- Sandeep as Nithya
- Raju Talikote as Ravi
- Rajendra Karanth
- Umashree
- Sharath Lohitashwa as ACP Manohar
- Achyuth Kumar as Venkat
- Vaijanath Biradar as Sairam
- Lakshman as Benki Mahadeva
- G. K. Govinda Raj
- Ramesh Pandit
- Sunetra Pandit
- Arun Sagar
- Mumaith Khan as an item number

== Music ==
Rajadhani

Soundtrack album by Arjun Janya
- Released: 2011
- Recorded: 2011
- Genre: Feature film soundtrack
- Length: 24:39
- Language: Kannada

Arjun Janya chronology
Kempe Gowda (2011)	Rajadhani (2011)	Rambo (2012)

Official audio
- Rajadhani - Full Album on YouTube

Arjun Janya composed the soundtrack album and background score for the film. The full album was released on 8 March 2011.

Track listing
No.	Title	Singer(s)	Length
1.	"Namma Appa"	Rahul Nambiar, Pavan Ranadheera, Harsha Sadananda	4:31
2.	"Midiva Ninna"	Sonu Nigam, Shreya Ghoshal	4:45
3.	"Tightu Tightu"	Mohammad Aslam, Pavan Ranadhheera, Sumanth	4:52
4.	"I Wanna Do It"	Kailash Kher	4:16
5.	"Tightu Tightu (remix)"	Mohammad Aslam, Pavan Ranadheera, Sumanth	4:00
6.	"Thottilu"	Arjun Janya	2:55
Total length:			24:39

== Reception ==
=== Critical response ===
A critic from The Times of India scored the film at 3.5 out of 5 stars and says "Full marks to Yash for his spirited performance in action and emotional sequences. Sheena has very little to do. Prakash Rai as police officer is graceful. Sandeep, Ravitheja, Chethan Chandra and Sathya have done their best. H C Venua's cinematography is amazing, especially in the climax. Music by Arjun is okay". Shruti Indira Lakshminarayana from Rediff.com scored the film at 1.5 out of 5 stars and wrote "Action sequences, especially the climax, were pitted as the highlight of the film. [...] Songs by Arjun however pep up the film. In total, the film leaves you asking for more. What could have been a thrilling roller coaster ride ends up being a merry-go-round!". A critic from The New Indian Express wrote "Music director Arun has provided lilting tunes. Ramesh Bhat and Umasri have provided good support. The movie is worth watching by youth, especially those who avoid hard work, and parents who fail to warn their children". B S Srivani from Deccan Herald wrote "He is loud, tough and dances like a dream. Music director Arjun seems to be in competition with the hero - the tunes are robust.Raajadhani ‘tries’ to keep people from ruining themselves. But it is doubtful if it reaches today’s youth. Just like the ones in the film. A pity".

=== Box office ===
Rajadhani got a good opening and was a moderate success at the box office. The film's opening proved Yash's newly found fan following after the success of his previous film Modalasala.
