= Devadas (2011 film) =

- DVD cover
- Directed by: ABCD Shanthakumar
- Written by: ABCD Shanthakumar; S. Manjunath (dialogues)
- Produced by: HM Krishnamurthy
- Starring: Yogesh; Jenile Pandya; Natanya
- Cinematography: Renukumar
- Music by: Joshua Sridhar
- Production company: Deepika Enterprises
- Release date: 13 May 2011
- Country: India
- Language: Kannada

Devadas is a 2011 Indian Kannada-language romantic drama film directed by ABCD Shanthakumar and starring Yogesh, Jenile Pandya and Natanya. The film was released on 13 May 2011.

== Cast ==
- Yogesh as Devu
- Jenile Pandya as Paro aka Parvathi
- Natanya as Chandramukhi
- Rangayana Raghu as Devu's father
- Ramesh Bhat as Paro's father
- Pramila Joshai
- Shanthakumar
- Kari Subbu

== Production ==
The film was in the cans for two years.

== Soundtrack ==
The music of the film is composed by Joshua Sridhar. The song "Sarayi Sheesheyali" from Mangalya Sakshi (1995) was reused in the film.

Track listing
No.	Title	Singer(s)	Length
1.	"Aadona Stepsu"	Benny Dayal, Sayanora	4:05
2.	"Bengaluru Galligella"	Karthik	3:57
3.	"Bul Bul"	Shashank	4:34
4.	"Devureno Neenu"	Hemanth	4:07
5.	"Koko Koko"	Karthik, Shwetha	4:27
6.	"Sarayi Sheesheyali"	S. P. Balasubrahmanyam	4:56
7.	"Sayyare Sayyare"	Karthik, Shwetha	4:37
Total length:			30:43

== Reception ==
A critic from Rediff.com wrote that "This Devdas will cry his way out of theatres very soon. Give the film a miss". A critic from Bangalore Mirror wrote that "Even for Yogesh’s hardcore fans, it will be difficult to fathom. Should we say more?"
