= Aishwarya Nag =

Indian actress

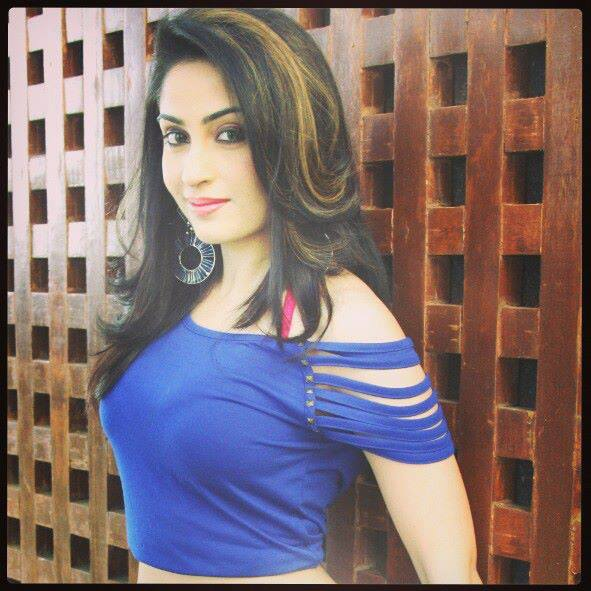
- Aishwarya at the Filmfare Magazine Photo Shoot
- Born: Aishwarya Nagendra Shenoy; 3 February 1994 (age 32); Bangalore, India
- Education: Bangalore University; Sheshadripuram College
- Occupations: Actress, model
- Years active: 2008–present
- Parents: Nagendra Shenoy (father); Rajani Shenoy (mother)

Aishwarya Nag is an Indian actress and model, who has appeared in South Indian films, primarily Kannada cinema. After her modelling, she made her acting debut in the film Neene Neene (2008), followed by Jolly Days (2009) and Kal Manja (2010).

== Career ==
Aishwarya debuted as a lead actress in the 2008 released film Neene Neene opposite Dhyan and Anant Nag. The film dealt with the pressures and hassles of tech workers, and was appreciated for being maturely dealt with. She was next seen in the MD Shridhar film Jolly Days, a remake of the Telugu hit Happy Days. It was well received by critics, one of whom called her a "very good heroine material in Kannada".

After a brief hiatus, Aishwarya was seen in the comedy, Kal Manja, which also had Komal Kumar in the cast. The film met with favorable reviews and her performance was lauded by critics. She then signed the film Vighna opposite Vijay Raghavendra, which underwent several delays in the making process. 2013 year saw her majority releases with Prajwal Devaraj starrer Ziddi being the first release. She appeared in the comedy film Loosegalu, another comedy opposite Vijay Raghavendra named Chella Pilli, a romantic comedy Pataisu and Jaathre opposite Chetan Chandra.

Aishwarya played the titular role in T. S. Nagabharana's 2014 film, Vasundhara. In Muddu Manase, she is seen riding a Royal Enfield with ease, a critically appreciated role. She played a media reporter in the movie Jaathre in 2015.

== Filmography ==
Year	Film	Role	Notes
2008	Neene Neene	Nandini	
2009	Jolly Days	Ankitha	
2011	Kal Manja	Indira	
2011	Vighneshwara		
2013	Ziddi	Sridevi	
2013	Chella Pilli	Diya	
2013	Loosegalu	Milky	Nominated, SIIMA Award for Best Supporting Actress
2014	Vasundhara	Vasundhara	Chitrasanthe Best actress critics award
2015	Muddu Manase	Mouna	SIIMA nomination
2015	Jaathre	Kiran	
