= Retta Thala =

2025 Tamil action film

- Theatrical release poster
- Directed by: Kris Thirukumaran
- Written by: Logan
- Produced by: Bobby Balachandran
- Starring: Arun Vijay; Siddhi Idnani; Tanya Ravichandran; Yogesh Samy
- Cinematography: Tijo Tomy
- Edited by: Llewellyn Anthony Gonsalvez
- Music by: Sam C. S.
- Production company: BTG Universal
- Distributed by: Ayngaran International
- Release date: 25 December 2025
- Running time: 113 minutes
- Country: India
- Language: Tamil

Retta Thala (transl. Two-headed) is a 2025 Indian Tamil-language action thriller film directed by Kris Thirukumaran, written by Logan and produced by Bobby Balachandran under his BTG Universal banner. The film stars Arun Vijay in a dual role alongside Siddhi Idnani, Tanya Ravichandran, Yogesh Samy, Hareesh Peradi, John Vijay and Balaji Murugadoss in supporting roles. It follows two identical men whose lives intersect through crime, deception, and shifting identities.

The film has music composed by Sam C. S., editing handled by Llewllyn Anthony Gonsalvez, and cinematography by Tijo Tomy. The film was officially in 4 April 2024. Principal photography began later the same month and wrapped that October. Retta Thala was released in theatres on 25 December 2025.

== Plot ==
Kaali, an orphan raised on the streets of Puducherry, survives through petty work and street smarts. His only emotional anchor is Anthre, his childhood girlfriend, whose desire for financial security increasingly clashes with Kaali’s modest aspirations. Kaali’s life changes when he encounters his exact lookalike, Malpe Upendra, a wealthy hitman recently released on bail. Upendra befriends Kaali and offers him a taste of luxury, an offer Kaali accepts, sharing these moments with Anthre.

Anthre, tempted by this easy shortcut to a life of excess, urges Kaali to kill Upendra and assume his identity so they can escape poverty. Kaali confronts Upendra, and in the ensuing struggle, kills him and disposes of the body by throwing it into a crocodile-infested water body. Kaali then assumes Upendra’s identity and occupies his house.

The next day, Thiraviyam, a corrupt police officer, visits Kaali, mistaking him for Upendra, and instructs him to report daily to the police station as part of his bail conditions. Kaali and Anthre subsequently discover that Upendra is an assassin from Goa and a murder accused who had killed the son of Sriramulu Jaganathan Reddy, a powerful and ruthless Goan don, over a car theft (in a John Wick–style incident). Unbeknownst to Kaali, Upendra himself had been plotting to exploit the resemblance. Along with his girlfriend Unnimaya, Upendra had planned to murder Kaali, assume his identity, and escape with a large sum of money in dollars via Nepal and onward to Turkey.

It is then explained that Reddy had arranged for Upendra to be released on bail so that he can kill him. Reddy and his men begin pursuing Kaali, who is posing as Upendra, and Kaali narrowly escapes several times. Although he manages to evade capture a few times, eventually Anthre, under threat, betrays Kaali by revealing his whereabouts. Kaali is captured and brutally interrogated. During questioning, he repeatedly insists that Upendra is dead and claims to have fed his body to crocodiles. His captors dismiss this as a fabrication but decide to search for the body while simultaneously planning to kill Anthre in the same manner to eliminate loose ends.

During this time, Thiraviyam arrives to negotiate with Kaali, seeking information about Upendra’s disappearance. Once again, Kaali confesses that he has killed Upendra. Before Thiraviyam can act, he receives a call from Delhi Intelligence that radically alters the situation. Fingerprint analysis reveals that Kaali is not who he claims to be. According to intelligence records, Kaali is actually John Bravo, a highly elusive international assassin and the spy of Cosa Nostra (Sicilian Mafia), wanted by Interpol and believed to have been operating undetected in India for years. No confirmed visual record of him exists.

Realising the threat Kaali poses, Thiraviyam attempts to contain the situation. Kaali kills Thiraviyam and his entire team with ease, revealing his true lethality. He then proceeds alone to the crocodile park, where Anthre is being held captive. In a violent confrontation, Kaali single-handedly eliminates Reddy and his entire gang and rescues her. After securing the money, Kaali hands it over to Anthre but tells her that staying with him would put her life in constant danger and they part ways.

In the film’s closing moments, Kaali is shown being pursued by a pair of hired goons, whom he swiftly kills. He then stands by the roadside asking for a lift. Vaijanti, Reddy's daughter-in-law offers him a ride. During the journey, she possibly attempts to shoot him, but the car crashes immediately after a gunshot is fired. The film ends abruptly with the assumption that Kaali has overpowered and shot her and is still alive.

== Cast ==
- Arun Vijay in a dual role as
  - Kaali aka John Bravo, a financially tight man, who is finally revealed to be a spy of Sicilian Mafia
  - Malpe Upendra, a Goan hitman, who is recently released on bail
- Siddhi Idnani as Anthre, Kaali's girlfriend
- Tanya Ravichandran as Vaijayanti
- Yogesh Samy as Malli, Vaijayanti's brother
- Hareesh Peradi as Sriramulu Jaganathan Reddy
- John Vijay as Inspector Dhiraviyam
- Balaji Murugadoss as Teja Reddy, Vaijayanti's husband and Jaganathan Reddy's son
- Deevra Haran as Unnimaya, Upendra's girlfriend
- Kalairani as Anthre's grandmother
- Ramachandran Durairaj as Paid Killer

== Production ==
=== Development ===
On 4 April 2024, actor Arun Vijay's 36th film was launched with a working title AV36 by the director Lokesh Kanagaraj after a formal puja in Chennai. The film marks the third production venture of Bobby Balachandran under his BTG Universal banner headed by Dr. M. Manoj Beno. The film also marks the third directorial venture of Kris Thirukumaran after Maan Karate (2014) and Gethu (2016). It stars Siddhi Idnani and Tanya Ravichandran as the lead actresses, and Kannada actor Yogesh making his debut in Tamil portraying the role of an antagonist. The technical team consists of editor Anthony, cinematographer Tijo Tomy, stunt choreographing duo Anbariv and Prabhu. The music is composed by Sam C. S.

=== Filming and post-production ===
Principal photography was planned to commence by the end of April 2024 in various locations like Goa, Pondicherry, Tharangampadi, Hyderabad, Chennai, and Ukraine. As planned, the filming began on 29 April 2024 and, got wrapped in mid-June 2024. After a break, the team resumed its shooting and on 26 September the makers announced their commencement of their short and final schedule at Goa. The final schedule got wrapped on 1 October which was officially confirmed on 19 October 2024. On 25 January 2025, the production house announced that Arun Vijay had completed dubbing for his portions.

== Music ==
Retta Thala

Soundtrack album by Sam C. S.
- Genre: Feature film soundtrack
- Language: Tamil
- Label: T-Series
- Producer: Sam C. S.

Sam C. S. chronology
Padaiyaanda Maaveeraa (2025)	Retta Thala (2025)	Vrusshabha (2025)

Singles from Retta Thala
- 1. "Kannamma" Released: 19 September 2025; 2. "Kandara Kolli" Released: 21 November 2025; 3. "Dark Theme" Released: 12 December 2025

The background and soundtrack were composed by Sam C. S. On 8 April 2025, it was announced that Dhanush sang a song in the film. The audio rights were acquired by T-Series. The first single titled "Kannamma" sung by Dhanush was released on 19 September 2025. The second single titled "Kandara Kolli" was released on 21 November 2025. The third single titled "Dark Theme" was released on 12 December 2025.

Track listing
No.	Title	Lyrics	Singer(s)	Length
1.	"Kannamma"	Sam C. S.	Dhanush	4:10
2.	"Kandara Kolli"	Viveka	Sivam	4:23
3.	"Dark Theme"	Sam C. S.	Sam C. S.

== Marketing ==
On 23 April 2024, Karthik Subbaraj, G. V. Prakash Kumar, and Vishnu Vishal unveiled the title of the film Retta Thala, with the first-look poster featuring the lead actor in dual roles. Arun Vijay, over his social media handle acknowledged and thanked director A. R. Murugadoss for giving away the title rights that he had been holding for about 10 years for his project with Ajith Kumar. The teaser of the film was released on 7 August 2025 by Sivakarthikeyan, the lead actor of Thirukumaran's directorial debut Maan Karate.

== Release ==
Retta Thala released in theatres on 25 December 2025, Christmas day. Earlier it was scheduled for 18 December. The film began streaming on Amazon Prime Video from 21 January 2026.

== Reception ==
Abhinav Subramanian of The Times of India gave 2.5/5 stars and wrote "Arun Vijay commits to both roles, staying lean and intense throughout. The script just doesn't give him space beyond standard action hero moves. [...] What's missing is flow. Scenes don't connect, they just happen in sequence. The film never finds a rhythm where you can settle in and believe what's happening." Prashanth Vallavan of Cinema Express gave 1.5/5 stars and wrote "This action-adventure feels like an imitation of sloppy AI-generated videos in a competition to prove that even in the art of making soulless videos, humans still reign supreme." Bhuvanesh Chandar of The Hindu wrote "The many unanswered loopholes aside, Arun Vijay’s ambitious double-action film could have been salvaged with a more focused screenplay, narrative discipline, and better character writing. [...] To sum it all up, Retta Thala is all about Arun Vijay and music composer Sam CS struggling to save an insipid thriller from becoming anything worse."
