= Kal Manja =

- Theatrical release poster
- Directed by: Ramesh Prabhakaran
- Written by: Rafi-Mecartin
- Screenplay by: Ramesh Prabhakaran
- Based on: Chathikkatha Chanthu (Malayalam, 2004)
- Produced by: Anasuya Komal
- Starring: Komal Kumar; Aishwarya Nag; Udhayathara
- Cinematography: T. Kaviyarasu
- Edited by: K. M. Prakash
- Music by: Emil Mohammed
- Production company: Soundarya Lahari Combines
- Release date: 4 February 2011
- Running time: 139 minutes
- Country: India
- Language: Kannada

Kal Manja is a 2011 Indian Kannada-language comedy-drama film written and directed by Ramesh Prabhakaran and produced by Anasuya Komal under Soundarya Lahari Combines. starring Komal Kumar and Udhayathara and Aishwarya Nag. The film is a remake of the 2004 Malayalam film Chathikkatha Chanthu. Emil Mohammed has composed the music. In the film, Manja, an aspiring scriptwriter writes a love letter to an imaginary girl known as Vasumathi and sends it on a fake address. The twist in the tale comes when a real Vasumathi receives the letter at the same address.

== Cast ==
- Komal Kumar as Kal Manja
- Aishwarya Nag as Indra
- Udhayathara as Vasumathi
- Guruprasad
- Sharan
- Thriller Manju
- Srinivasa Murthy
- Ramesh Bhat
- Killer Venkatesh

== Soundtrack ==
The music of the film was composed by Emil Mohammed.

#	Title	Singer(s)	Lyricist
1	"Komal Mast Komal"	Rahul Nambiar, Suchitra	Ram Narayan
2	"Yaare Yene Helidaru"	Suchitra, Saindhavi	Jayanth Kaikini
3	"Love Letter"	Yazin Nizar, Sunitha	Raghavendra Kamath
4	"Knock Out"	Jassie Gift, Emil Mohammed	K. Kalyan
5	"Indhe Kano"	Binny Krishnakumar	Kaviraj

== Reception ==
=== Critical response ===
Shruti Indira Lakshminarayana from Rediff.com scored the film at 3 out of 5 stars and says "Actresses Udayathara and Aishwarya Nag have significant roles too. Udayathara comes out with a decent performance. Songs by Emil are easy on the ears. One of his compositions goes Komal mastu Kamalu... and we gladly agree. The film comes with a good story laced with humour. There are lots of twists and turns and this keeps you hooked through and through. For two and a half hours of pure comedy, watch Kal Manja". B S Srivani from Deccan Herald wrote "The screenplay keeps one enticed with the promise of something memorable, but only just. Kavi Urs’s work leaves much to be desired. But the story and Udayatara’s competent performance make meeting Kal Manja an enjoyable experience". A critic from The New Indian Express wrote "Ishwarya Nag is beautiful but stoic throughout the movie. Thriller Manju, Raju Talikote, Sharan and Guru Prasad have provided good support.Emil has provided good music. Songs are good. It is worth watching only if you can put up with slow narration during the post-intermission session". A critic from The Times of India scored the film at 3.5 out of 5 stars and wrote "Udayatara and Aishwarya Nag could have done a much better job.While dialogues by Rajendra Karanth have done justice to the script, music by Emil and cinematography by T Kaviarasu are not appealing".
