= Melody Drama (film) =

- Theatrical release poster
- Directed by: Manju Karthik G
- Written by: Manju Karthik G
- Produced by: M Nanjunda Reddy
- Starring: Sathya Shraya; Supreetha Sathyanarayan
- Cinematography: Manu D B Halli
- Music by: Kiran Ravindranath
- Distributed by: KRG Studios
- Release date: 9 June 2023
- Country: India
- Language: Kannada

Melody Drama is a 2023 Indian Kannada-language drama film directed by Manju Karthik G. It stars Sathya Shraya, Supreetha Sathyanarayan, Rangayana Raghu and Anu Prabhakar. It was released theatrically on 9 June 2023.

== Cast ==
- Sathya Shraya as Karthik
- Supreetha Sathyanarayan as Hita
- Rangayana Raghu
- Anu Prabhakar as Indirakka
- Rajesh Nataranga as Hita's father
- Bala Rajwadi
- Lakshmi Siddaiah
- Ashwin Rao Pallakki
- Ashwin Hasan
- Ranjan Sanath
- Vinod Gobbara
- Chetan Chandra

== Soundtrack ==
Melody Drama

Soundtrack album by Kiran Ravindranath
- Released: 2023
- Recorded: 2022
- Genre: Feature film soundtrack
- Length: 24:31
- Language: Kannada

Official audio
- Melody Drama - Full Album on YouTube

The songs are composed by Kiran Ravindranath and songs sung by Sonu Nigam, Kailash Kher and Palak Muchhal. The lyrics are penned by Jayant Kaikini, V. Nagendra Prasad, and Dhananjay Ranjan.

Track listing
No.	Title	Singer(s)	Length
1.	"Ondu Becchane Bhavane"	Sonu Nigam	5:02
2.	"Endu Endendu"	Sonu Nigam	4:06
3.	"Yaaru Bareyada Kavithe"	Palak Macchal	4:28
4.	"Chadurida Baligodu"	Palak Macchal	4:28
5.	"Sainikaa Sainikaa"	Kailash Kher	3:52
6.	"Appa NinnaPugeyu"	Rihanaa	3:17
Total length:			24:31

== Reception ==
=== Critical response ===
A Sharadhaa from The New Indian Express wrote "However, apart from that, the film feels soulless in terms of its music, story, and character development. It is advisable to skip this musical journey and instead revisit the enchanting experience of watching Mungaru Male once again". Y Maheswara Reddy from Bangalore Mirror says "Cinematographer Manu Halli has done an excellent job behind the camera. It is worth a watch also if you want to see beautiful locations of Karnataka". A reviewer of Kannada Asianet News wrote "After finding out why the person who should clap was missing that day, and what is the relationship between it and the hero, the heroine comes to the point of divorcing the hero. Those who are curious and patient can watch this movie". Sridevi S from The Times of India wrote "Though it is pegged as a musical drama, songs don't linger on. The movie works only in parts and if rom-coms are your genre, this is a one-time watch".
