= Neene Neene =

- DVD cover
- Directed by: Shivadhwaj
- Written by: Shivadhwaj
- Produced by: S Basava Reddy
- Starring: Dhyan; Aishwarya Nag
- Cinematography: Dinesh Baboo
- Edited by: K M Prakash
- Music by: Srimurali
- Production company: Advik Creations
- Release date: 6 June 2008
- Country: India
- Language: Kannada

Neene Neene (transl. Only you, only you) is a 2008 Indian Kannada-language romantic drama film written and directed by Shivadhwaj and starring Dhyan and Aishwarya Nag. The film's title is based on a song from Aakash (2005).

== Cast ==
- Dhyan as Abhishek
- Aishwarya Nag as Nandini
- Ananth Nag as Rajasekhar
- Sharan
- Dileep Raj
- Shailaja Joshi
- Mohan Juneja

== Soundtrack ==
All music is composed by Srimurali. The song "Yenu Yenu" is based on Telugu song "Yemo Avunemo" from Nee Sneham.

Track listing
No.	Title	Singer(s)	Length
1.	"Yenu Yenu (Pathos)"	Rajesh Krishnan, Nanditha
2.	"Kusumari Kusumari"	Hariharan
3.	"I Am In Love"	Kunal Ganjawala, Chaitra H. G.
4.	"Yenu Yenu (Happy)"	Sonu Nigam
5.	"Mobile Mobile"	S. P. Balasubrahmanyam, Chaitra H. G.
Total length:			18:16

== Reception ==
R. G. Vijayasarathy of Rediff.com gave the film a rating of two out of five stars and said that "All in all, however, despite competent performances from the artists, the film fails to strike a chord with the audience mainly because of the poor script and very slow pace of narration". A critic from Sify opined that "The city based film Neene Neene by debutant director Shivadwaj is brilliant at places. Shivadwaj reorganizing of screenplay and slashing half a dozen lengthy scenes or making the film racy especially in the second half would have earned him distinction".

== Box office ==
The film was a box office failure.
