= Thottakkattukara =

Thottakkattukara Thottakkattukara
- town
- Location in Kerala, India
- Coordinates: 10.117579°N 76.344242°E
- Country: India
- State: Kerala
- District: Ernakulam

Languages
  - Official: Malayalam, English
- Time zone: UTC+5:30 (IST)
- Vehicle registration: KL-41

Thottakkattukara is a locality in the Aluva, Kerala, India. It is connected through all types of transportation. It is located on the banks of Aluva Puzha (Periyar River). It is just located near the Manappuram Mahadeva Temple at Manappuram, Aluva.
