= Ambara =

- Directed by: Sen Prakash
- Produced by: Anand Raj
- Starring: Yogesh; Bhama
- Cinematography: Soori
- Edited by: Ravikumar
- Music by: Abhiman Roy
- Production company: Aura Cinemas
- Release date: 15 November 2013
- Running time: 142 minutes
- Country: India
- Language: Kannada

Ambara (transl. Sky) is a 2013 Indian Kannada-language romance film written and directed by Sen Prakash. The film stars Yogesh and Bhama in the lead roles.

The film was released on 15 November 2013.

== Cast ==
- Yogesh as Ajay
- Bhama as Arundathi
- Harish Raj
- Sudha Belawadi
- Tilak as Vilas
- Vishwa
- Sadhu Kokila
- Bank Janardhan
- Jai Jagadish
- Ramakrishna
- Padma Vasanthi
- Jayasheela
- Vinayak Joshi
- Shille Manjunath

== Production ==
A set boy named Sada died while the film was being shot in Haridwar and the nearby Ganges area.

== Soundtrack ==
Music director Abhiman Roy has composed 7 tracks for the movie.

- "Lovey Thrillingu" - Tippu, Supriya Lohith
- "Saniha Banda Mele" - Sonu Nigam, Yashi
- "Hai Hai Re Hai" - Mujipur Rahman, Saindhavi
- "Vande Mataram" (bit) - Yashi
- "Poli Poli" - Gurukiran, Kiran Sagar, Supriya Lohith
- "Kaanade Kaanade" - Anuradha Bhat, Naresh Iyer
- "Saniha Banda Mele" (remix) - Soni Nigam, Yashi

== Release ==
=== Critical reception ===
A critic from The Times of India rated the film 3 out of 5 and wrote that "Though the script is good, the narration is completely confusing till the climax which has some dramatic sequences". A critic from Rediff.com gave the film a rating of 1 1/2 out of 5 and opined that "Ambara is a disappointing film, moving along predictable lines".
