= Iswarya Menon =

Indian actress

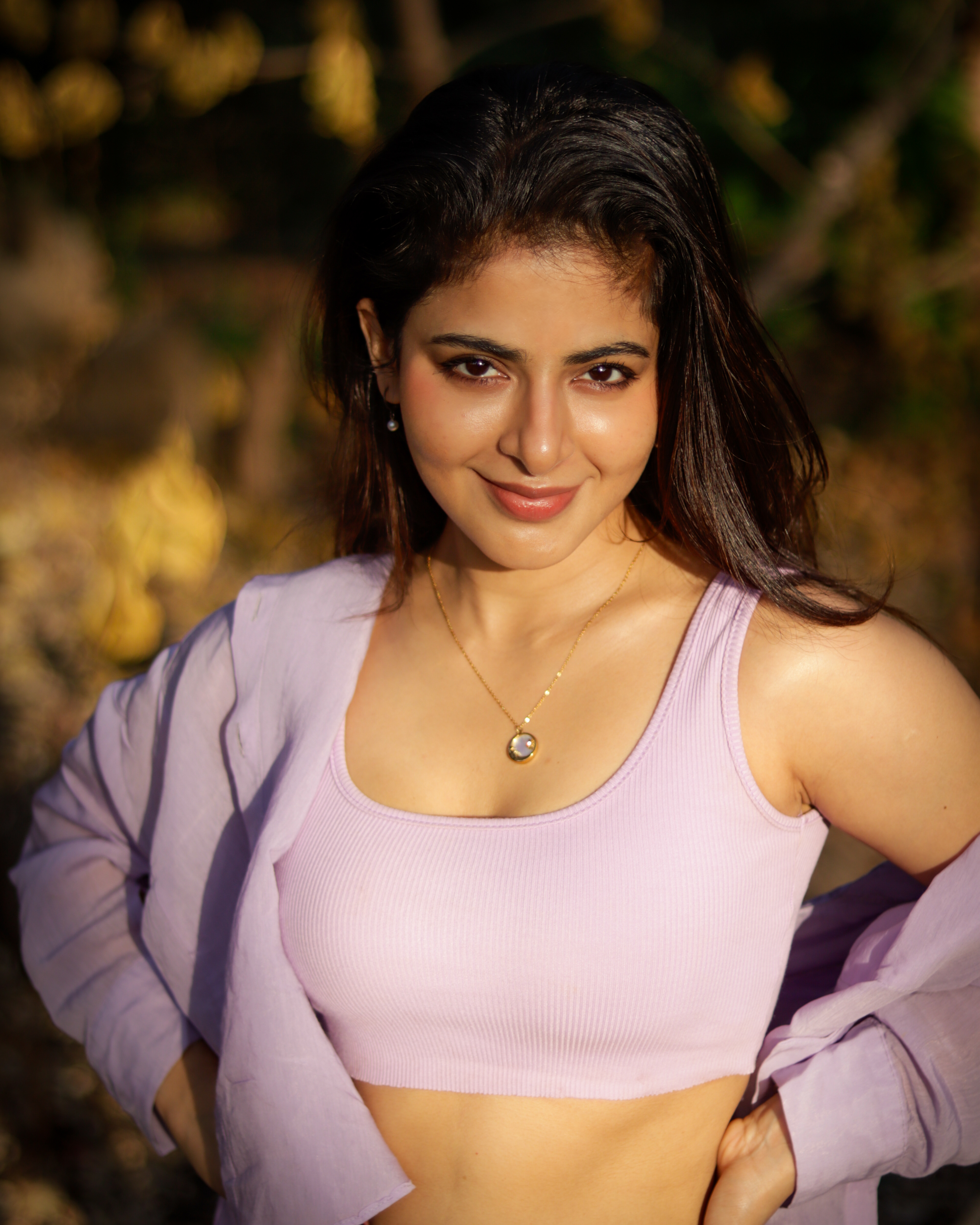
- Iswarya Menon
- Born: Erode, Tamil Nadu, India
- Education: SRM Institute of Science and Technology
- Occupation: Actress
- Years active: 2009-present

Iswarya Menon is an Indian actress who works in Tamil, Kannada, Telugu, and Malayalam films.

== Early life and education ==
Iswarya Menon's family is from Chendamangalam, Kerala. She was born and brought up in Erode, Tamil Nadu. She did her higher secondary education at Vellalar Matriculation School, Erode. She completed her Instrumentation engineering from the SRM Institute of Science and Technology.

== Career ==
Menon was first seen in the Tamil comedy film Theeya Velai Seiyyanum Kumaru. She debuted as Akshara in the Kannada industry with Dasavala which was directed by M S Ramesh. She was cast opposite Prem, of Jogi fame. The film released on 11 October 2013 and her performance as a mentally challenged girl was generally well received. Her next release was Tamil film Apple Penne. The film was based on a mother and daughter relationship, where Iswarya was the daughter, while Roja essayed the role of her mother. She will next be seen in the Kannada horror comedy Namo Boothatma.

== Filmography ==
=== Film ===
Key
†	Denotes films that have not yet been released

Year	Title	Role	Language	Notes
2012	Kadhalil Sodhappuvadhu Yeppadi	Shivani	Tamil	
2013	Apple Penne	Komalavalli	Tamil	
2013	Theeya Velai Seiyyanum Kumaru	Kumar and Sanjana's coworker	Tamil	
2013	Dasavala	Aishwarya	Kannada	
2014	Ner Ethir	Nethra	Tamil	
2014	Namo Bhootatma	Soumya	Kannada	
2016	Monsoon Mangoes	Rekha	Malayalam	
2018	Veera	Renuka	Tamil	
2018	Tamizh Padam 2	Ramya / Gayathri / Khaleesi	Tamil	Triple role
2020	Naan Sirithal	Ankitha	Tamil	
2022	Vezham	Leena	Tamil	
2023	Spy	Agent Vaishnavi	Telugu	
2024	Bhaje Vaayu Vegam	Indu	Telugu	
2025	Bazooka	Jovita / Pocket Dynamite	Malayalam	
2026	Nagabandham: The Secret Treasure	Suvarna	Telugu	

=== Television ===
List of Iswarya Menon television credits
Year	Title	Role	Language	Channel/Platform	Notes	Ref.
2012	Thendral	Shruthi	Tamil	Sun TV		
2022	Tamil Rockerz	Kirthana	Tamil	Sony Liv		
