= Nenapinangala =

2013 Kannada film

Nenapinangala (ನೆನಪಿನಂಗಳ)
- Directed by: Dhanuchandra Mavinakunte
- Written by: Dhanuchandra Mavinakunte
- Produced by: G Ramakrishna
- Starring: Hemanth; Supreetha; Ramesh Bhat; Sudha Belawadi
- Cinematography: G Renukumar
- Edited by: Kumar Kotekoppa
- Music by: C R Bobby
- Release date: 21 March 2013
- Country: India
- Language: Kannada

Nenapinangala is a 2013 Indian Kannada-language film directed by Dhanuchandra Mavinakunte starring Hemanth, Supreetha, Ramesh Bhat and Sudha Belawadi in lead roles.

== Cast ==
- Hemanth as Surya
- Supreetha as Pallavi
- Ramesh Bhat
- Sudha Belawadi
- Karibasavaiah
- Ninasam Ashwath
- Nagendra Urs
- Shankar Bhat
- Dr Chikkahejjaji Mahadev
- Shashikala
- Vishwa
- Kuri Sunil
- Chitra Shenoy

== Music ==
Nenapinangala

Soundtrack album by Bobby CR
- Released: 2013
- Recorded: 2013
- Genre: Feature film soundtrack
- Length: 30:13
- Language: Kannada
- Label: Anand Audio

Official audio
- Nenapinangala - Full Album on YouTube

Track listing
No.	Title	Singer(s)	Length
1.	"Idu Obba Premiya"	Shamitha Malnad	2:22
2.	" Heegeke Noduve"	Rajesh Krishnan	4:42
3.	"Preethisuva"	Chetan Sosca	4:53
4.	"Yaaro Evanu"	Chaitra H. G.	4:11
5.	"Ondondu Muthina Haniyu"	Rajesh Krishnan	4:19
6.	" Mella Mella Nanndage"	Lakshmi Nataraj	3:42
7.	"E Bandhana Noothara"	Hemanth Kumar	4:28
8.	"E Putta Hrudayada"	Rajesh Krishnan	1:08
9.	"Heegeke Ee Jagadolu"	Hemanth Kumar	0:41
10.	"Ondu Mathu Helade"	L. N. Shastri	1:47
Total length:			30:13

== Reception ==
=== Critical response ===
Srikanth Srinivasa of Rediff.com scored the film at 2 out of 5 stars and says "Nenapinangala is a reasonably good movie given that a bunch of newcomers are involved in its making. It has some excellent performances by Supreetha and Ramesh Bhat" The Times of India scored the film at 3 out of 5 stars and wrote "Hemanth, though impressive, has to get training in expression and body language. Ramesh Bhat is graceful. Music director CR Bobby has given some excellent numbers. G Renukumar’s cinematography is okay". Bangalore Mirror scored the film at 3 out of 5 stars and wrote "CR Bobby has managed to give a few melodious tunes. At least, three songs stand out for its quality. Renukumar as the cinematographer passes muster. The minus points are the comedy that are wasted and the length that that should have been pruned at the editing table". B S Srivani of Deccan Herald wrote "He stretches the climax unnecessarily and all the good work comes nearly undone with it. Story is nothing out of the ordinary, but this is a rare instance of performances, music and dialogues all pitching in to transform ordinary into extraordinary. This playground of memories has plenty of positives to take home".
