= Bangari (2013 film) =

- Directed by: Ma. Chandru
- Written by: Ma. Chandru
- Screenplay by: Ma. Chandru
- Produced by: A. Ellappa
- Starring: Yogesh; Ragini Dwivedi
- Cinematography: Niranjan Babu
- Music by: A. M. Neel
- Production company: Shivashankara Productions
- Release date: 1 February 2013
- Country: India
- Language: Kannada

Bangari is a 2013 Indian Kannada-language romantic film starring Yogesh and Ragini Dwivedi in the lead roles. The film is directed by Ma. Chandru who makes his debut in direction after assisting few Tamil films. A. M. Neel has scored the music and Niranjan Babu has done the cinematography. A. Ellappa, a realtor turned producer has produced the film under Shivashankara Productions.

== Cast ==
- Yogesh as Bangari
- Ragini Dwivedi as Paddhu
- Rangayana Raghu
- Sadhu Kokila
- Ramesh Bhat
- Kadhal Dandapani

== Production ==
The film officially began in the presence of actor Shivarajkumar at the Kanteerava studios in Bangalore. Ragini Dwivedi, fresh from the success of Kempegowda was cast as the title protagonist Bangari, a village girl with many ambitions and possessions. Yogesh was cast as her love interest who is also from a rural background. The total budget has reached around 40 million. The shooting commenced with a fixed target of 65 days out of which 32 days were shot in Kolar.

== Soundtrack ==
Bangari

Soundtrack album by A. M. Neel
- Released: 2013
- Recorded: 2013
- Genre: Feature film soundtrack
- Length: 27:07
- Language: Kannada

Official audio
- Bangari - Full Album on YouTube

The soundtrack of the album was released on 9 November 2012. Bangari consists of 7 songs composed by A. M. Neel.

Track listing
No.	Title	Singer(s)	Length
1.	"Jaimande Madesha"	Shankar Mahadevan	4:26
2.	"Bangarige Preethi"	Tippu	4:34
3.	"Chang Changlu Hudgeeru"	Yogesh	4:20
4.	"Yenella Helona"	Sonu Nigam, Shreya Ghoshal	4:35
5.	"Aasepattu"	Udit Narayan	5:21
6.	"Kannalli Sanne"	Karthik, Supriya Ramakrishnaiah	4:07
7.	"Thayiginta Devarilla"	Karthik, Supriya Ramakrishnaiah	3:19
Total length:			27:02

== Reception ==
=== Critical response ===
A critic from The Times of India scored the film at 3 out of 5 stars and wrote "While Yogish has done a good job, Ragini shines with a bold performance as his lover. Ramesh Bhat is gracious. Music by AM Neel has some catchy tunes. Cinematography by Niranjanbabu is good". A Shardhha of The New Indian Express wrote "Ragini Dwivedi is at her charming best but too glamourous [sic] to be a village belle. Sadhu Kokila in a comedy dose is a total waste, which is a minus point for the film. Sharath Lohitashava is completely sidelined while Ramesh Bhat and Sathya Priya have justified their roles. Nothing impressive about the camerawork nor editing. A couple of songs by AM Neel are hummable". Srikant Sriniwasa of Rediff.com scored the film at 2 out of 5 stars and says "Bangari is an average entertainer but quite engaging given the fact that it marks the debut of a director." A critic from News18 India wrote "Also, two songs by Neel are well composed, but Niranjan Babu's camera work is ordinary. Overall, one can say 'Bangari' is a disappointing film". B S Srivani from Deccan Herald wrote " Ragini sheds her awkwardness for Bangari and impresses as the bold village girl who doesn’t mind her man chopping off enemies of love. Yogesh’s new found maturity is pleasing. Bangari, however, remains his mother’s pet and of the audience in songs".
