= Preethse Preethse =

- DVD cover
- Directed by: K Madesh
- Story by: K Suresh Goswamy
- Produced by: Krishnayya
- Starring: Yogesh; Udhayathara; Pragna
- Cinematography: Veenus Murthy
- Edited by: Thirupathi Reddy
- Music by: Anoop Seelin
- Release date: 26 June 2009
- Country: India
- Language: Kannada

Preethse Preethse (transl. Love me, love me) is a 2009 Indian Kannada-language film directed by K Madesh starring Yogesh, Udhayathara and Pragna in the lead roles.

== Cast ==
- Yogesh as Mada a.k.a. Akash
- Udhayathara as Aishwarya
- Pragna as Bipasa
- Jai Jagadish as Akash's adopted father
- Sangeetha as Akash's adopted mother
- Ramesh Bhat
- Rangayana Raghu
- P. N. Sathya
- M. S. Umesh
- Honnavalli Krishna

== Music ==
Preethse Preethse

Soundtrack album by Anoop Seelin
- Released: 18 June 2009
- Recorded: 2009
- Genre: Feature film soundtrack
- Length: 23:35
- Language: Kannada

Official audio
- Preethse Preethse - Full Album on YouTube

All lyrics are written by V. Nagendra Prasad.

Track listing
| No. | Title | Singer(s) | Length |
|---|---|---|---|
| 1. | "Dheemthakita" | Rithisha Padmanabh | 1:51 |
| 2. | "Kuchu Kuchu" | Shamitha Malnad, Tippu | 4:16 |
| 3. | "Loose Maada" | J. Anoop Seelin | 4:55 |
| 4. | "Preethse Preethse" | J. Anoop Seelin | 4:44 |
| 5. | "Sundara" | Sangeetha Manojam | 4:35 |
| 6. | "Urige Baare" | Shankar Mahadevan, Sunitha | 4:35 |
| Total length: | | | 23:35 |

== Reception ==
=== Critical response ===
R G Vijayasarathy of Rediff.com scored the film at 1.5 out of 5 stars and says "Anoop Sileen's music is good. Songs like Preethse Preethse, Loose Maada, and Urige Baare are well picturised while the Bangkok song has only sex and glitz. Preethse Preethse can be enjoyed only by Yogish's fans. Otherwise it is just an ordinary film". A critic from The New Indian Express wrote "Music director Anup Cylin has done a good job with the songs. It is worth watching only if you are a die-hard fan of Yogeesh alias Loose Mada and do not care for anything else". BS Srivani from Deccan Herald wrote "Madesh takes the audience on a blind date during the first half, with all the attendant feelings. It is only during the second half, when the viewers are sated of curiosity about the characters, that the film gets interesting. ‘Preethse Preethse’ offers a number of opportunities for psycho-analysis". A critic from Sify.com wrote "Yogish dialogue delivery is a drawback. He has to improve his looks too via a good make up man. Pragna in her short presence steals the show. Udayatara in her debut Kannada film is quite OK. Ramesh Bhat and Jai Jagdish as caring parents give a precise performance".
