= Snake Shyam =

Indian wildlife conservationist

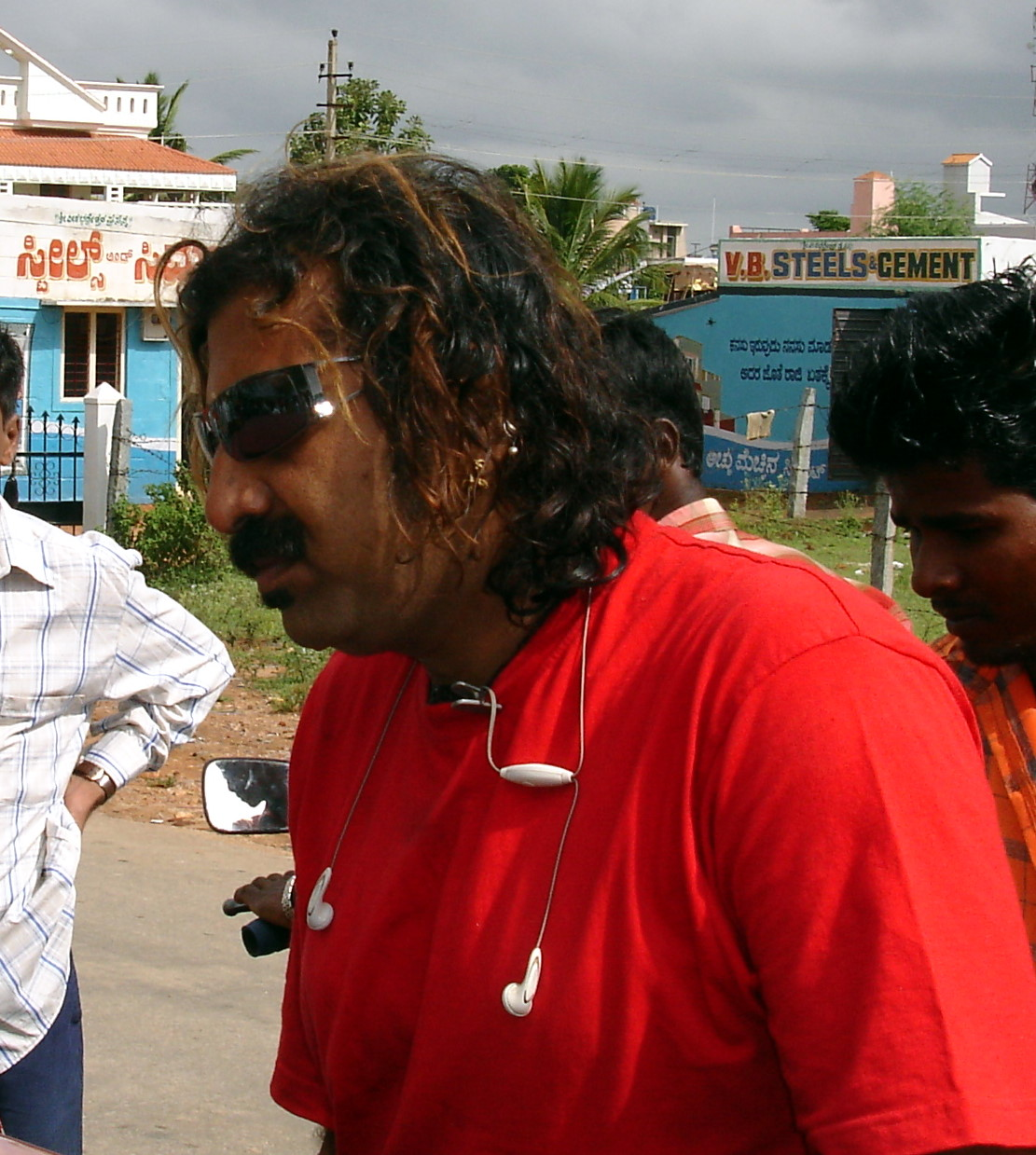
- Snake Shyam
- Born: 1967 (age 58–59); Cheluvaamba Hospital, Krishnarajanagara, Mysore State, India
- Other name: Snake Bite
- Occupations: Snake conservationist, Auto rickshaw Driver, former Counselor - Mysore City Corporation (MCC)
- Known for: Snake enthusiasm
- Website: snakeshyammysore.com

M. S. Balasubramania (alt spelling Balasubramanya; born 1967), popularly known as Snake Shyam, is a snake enthusiast, wildlife conservationist and lecturer in Mysore, India. He was elected to the Mysore City Corporation in 2013, a role he served until 2018.

Though not a trained herpetologist, Shyam is known throughout the Mysore region as a "naturalist on wheels". He rescues and rehabilitates snakes and educates the public about them. He is also sometimes consulted by local hospitals to identify a species of snake prior to treating a snakebite victim.

Shyam has been widely recognized for his work. National Geographic featured him in its Croc Chronicles: Snakes, Karma, Action special. He has also been featured on the Discovery channel. Mysore city has named a street for him and has dedicated its first "urban forest" to him and fellow environmentalist Hyder Ali Khan.

Shyam is also known for his personal flamboyance and has been described by The Hindu as "easily the most recognisable characters [sic] of Mysore, complete with his sun hat, overflowing beads and multiple rings that adorn his fingers".

== Background ==
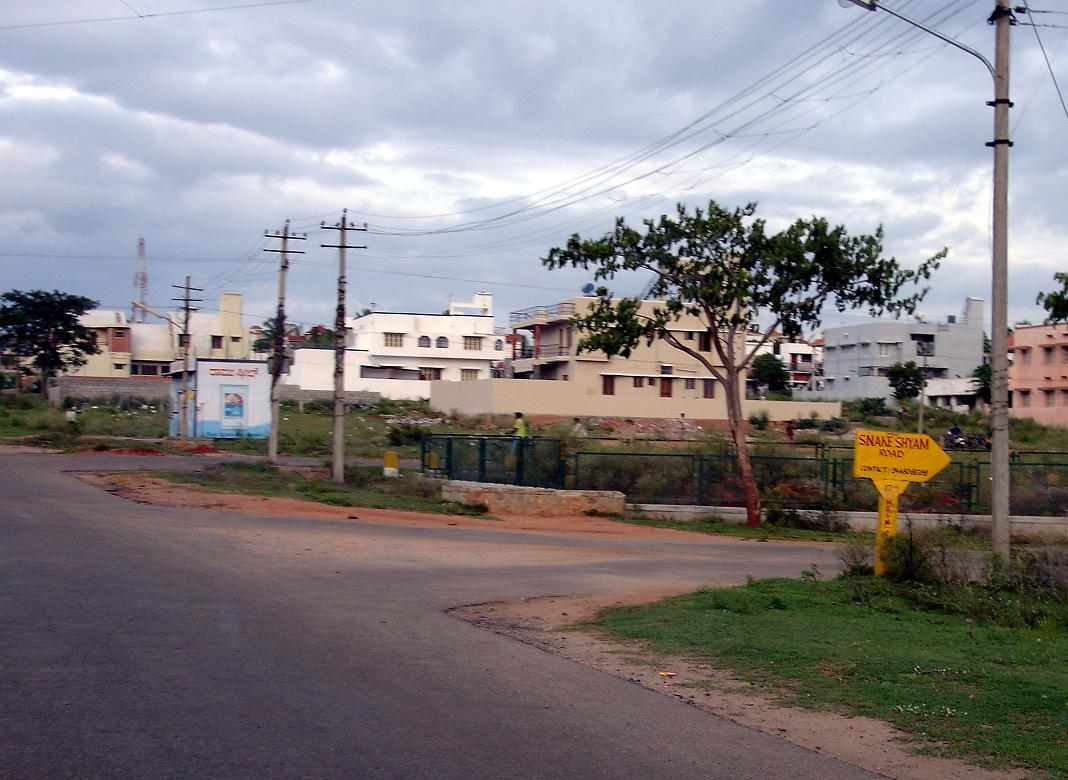
The road named after Snake Shyam by the Mysore City Corporation

Shyam was born to M.R.Subbarao and A.Nagalakshmi Mirle in Cheluvaamba Hospital, Krishnarajanagara, Mysore State, now in Karnataka, India. He demonstrated his interest in snakes at an early age, when a snake invaded a neighbor's home. After convincing those around not to kill the snake, he caught it and released it into the garden. From this incident, he earned his nickname.

== Avocation ==
By profession, Shyam was a driver, transporting children to school, but beginning in 1982, he began to be frequently called upon to retrieve snakes that had encroached on people's properties, a job for which he receives no pay. Called multiple times each day, Shyam uses a pillowcase and a badminton racquet without strings to net the snakes, which he then releases into the forest. Though his avocation to safely remove these snakes has cost him considerable expense, Shyam continues from the desire to see these snakes released rather than killed. Recently, authorities in Mysore have offered to defray some of Shyam's expenses by paying his telephone bills.

In 2004, he estimated that he may have caught and released over 40,000 snakes since he began in 1980; as of February 2008, the official record, which he began in 1980(Unofficially he has caught nearly 40,000 Snakes between 1980-1997), was 11,755. Though Shyam has only been bitten four times in his rescue work, he has developed an allergy to antivenin, which requires that he exercise great care in handling snakes.

His knowledge of snakes—he can identify 28-30 local species of snakes—is founded on personal experience, but supplemented by reading the works of or speaking to professionals such as Romulus Whitaker, J.C. Daniel and faculty at Mysore University. Shyam's van features paintings depicting snakes and also displays his slogans: "Snakes are not as poisonous as human beings" and "Care for the rare".

Snake Shyam was elected to Mysore City Corporation in the elections held in March 2013, sponsored by the BJP. In August 2018, he was expelled from the party for "anti-party activities" and chose to contest as an independent, unsuccessfully.

In 2019, he completed another record by catching 32,000 Snakes.

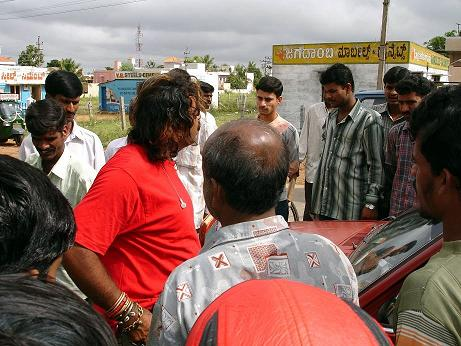
Snake Shyam (in red shirt) with the local people after a 'snake encounter'
