= Yogesh (actor) =

Indian film actor

- Born: 6 July 1990 (age 36); Bangalore, India
- Other names: Loose Maada, Yogi
- Occupations: Actor; producer; playback singer
- Years active: 2007–present
- Known for: Duniya (2007); Ambari (2009)
- Spouse: Sahithya (m. 2017)
- Children: 1
- Relatives: Duniya Vijay (uncle)

Yogesh (born 6 July 1990; sometimes billed as Yogi and Yogish) is an Indian actor and singer who appears in Kannada films. He stepped into the limelight with his debut in the 2007 blockbuster Duniya, where his portrayal of the quirky and memorable character Loose Maada earned him instant fame and a lasting nickname among fans. This role not only marked his entry into Sandalwood but also set the stage for a career filled with versatility and acclaim.

After his impactful debut, Yogesh transitioned into lead roles with Nanda Loves Nanditha (2008), a romantic drama that became a massive hit across Karnataka. His career-defining moment came with Ambari(2009), directed by A. P. Arjun, where his heartfelt performance as Dhanush won critical and commercial success. This film earned him Karnataka State Film Award for Best Actor, cementing his position as a leading star. His other notable films include, Hudugaru (2011), Sidlingu (2012), Alemari (2012), Yaare Koogadali (2012), Bangari (2013) and Bhajarangi (2013).

== Early life ==
Yogesh was born on 6 July 1990 in Bangalore, Karnataka. He grew up in a family deeply connected to the Kannada film industry — his father T.P. Siddaraju is a well-known producer, and his uncle is actor Duniya Vijay. His mother’s name is Ambuja, and he has a brother named Mahesh.

Yogesh completed his schooling in Bangalore, though specific school names are not widely documented. After finishing his pre-university education (PUC), he reportedly focused on pursuing a career in films rather than continuing formal higher education. His passion for acting and the opportunity provided by his father’s production ventures led him to enter the Kannada film industry at the age of 17 with the movie Duniya (2007).

== Career ==
=== 2007-2010: Debut and breakthrough ===
Yogesh made his debut in 2007 film Duniya, directed by Soori, playing the iconic supporting role Loose Maada. His quirky dialogue delivery and raw energy struck a chord with audiences, making him an overnight sensation. Critics praised his natural performance, calling him “a scene-stealer despite limited screen time.” He transitioned to lead roles with Nanda Loves Nanditha (2008), a romantic drama that became a box-office hit. Reviewers noted his “intense portrayal of a passionate lover,” and the film’s music and emotional depth helped cement his image as a romantic hero.

This year 2009 proved to be pivotal to Yogesh with multiple releases. The A. P. Arjun directorial Ambari proved to be a turning point in his career. His performance as Dhanush earned him the Karnataka State Film Award for Best Actor. Critics hailed it as “a mature, heartfelt act that elevated the film.” Other releases such as Preethse Preethse, Ravana, and Yogi showcased his versatility, though Ambari overshadowed the rest.

In 2010, films like Punda, Yaksha, and cameo in Krishnan Love Story kept him in the spotlight. While these were moderate successes, reviewers observed that Yogesh was “trying to balance mass appeal with performance-driven roles.”

=== 2011-2020: Varied roles and Critical acclaim ===
In 2011, Yogesh played Siddesh in Hudugaru, a remake of Tamil film Naadodigal, alongside Puneeth Rajkumar, earning the Suvarna Award for Best Supporting Actor. Critics appreciated his “effortless chemistry with the ensemble cast” and called him “a strong pillar in the narrative.” The year 2012 saw him in Sidlingu with Ramya – a critically acclaimed role that fetched him a Filmfare nomination. Reviews described his performance as “nuanced and deeply rooted in rural sensibilities.” Other films such as Alemari, Yaare Koogadali (yet again with Puneeth Rajkumar), and Kalaya Tasmai Namaha showcased his ability to handle diverse genres. The latter film featured his debut playback song "Khali Roadu Onti Girlu". Films like Bangari, Ambara, and cameo in Bhajarangi kept him relevant in the mass circuit. Critics noted that while scripts were formulaic, Yogesh’s “energetic screen presence” remained a highlight.

In 2014, he debuted as a producer in the film Darling. Later, he featured in few offbeat films such as Kiragoorina Gayyaligalu and Kala Bhairava earned him praise for “choosing offbeat narratives.” However, some projects like Bhagyaraj and Parapancha received lukewarm responses. He was part of the ensemble cast in films such as John Jani Janardhan (2016) and Mass Leader (2017), where he teamed up with Shiva Rajkumar. His titular roles in the gangster drama Yogi Duniya (2018) and the comedy, Lambodara (2019) earned him critical appraise.

=== 2021-present: New collaborations ===
The recent works of Yogesh include Lanke (2021), Ombattane Dikku (2022), Head Bush (2022), Graamaayana (2026) and Bail (2026) where he collaborated with new-age directors and experimented with gangster and thriller genres. Critics observed that Yogesh is “evolving with changing trends while retaining his mass appeal.”

Yogesh made his debut in Tamil cinema portraying the role of an antagonist in the film Retta Thala.

=== Television ===
Besides films, he has appeared in the television dance talent show Thaka Dhimi Tha Dancing star as a judge. He also participated in Bigg Boss Kannada Season 1, a reality show on Colors Kannada channel.

== Personal life ==
Yogesh is the son of producer TP Siddaraju. He married his longtime girlfriend Sahitya on November 2, 2017, in Bangalore. They have a daughter Shrinika.

== Filmography ==
=== Films ===
Year	Film	Role	Notes
2007	Duniya	Loose Maada	Supporting role
2008	Nanda Loves Nanditha	Nanda	Debut as lead actor
2008	Hrudaya I Miss You	Poorni's lover	Cameo appearance
2009	Ambari	Dhanush	Won, Karnataka State Film Award for Best Actor
2009	Preethse Preethse	Mada / Akash	
2009	Mr. Painter	Anil	Guest appearance
2009	Yogi	Yogi	Also playback singer for the songs "Ae Maga" and "Brucelee Vamsha"
2009	Ravana	Vinod	
2010	Punda	Yogi	
2010	Krishnan Love Story	Himself	Cameo appearance in the song "Mosa Madalendu Neenu"
2010	Yaksha	Yaksha Raj Pulikeshi	
2011	Dhool	Guru	
2011	Hudugaru	Siddesh	Won, Suvarna Award for Best Supporting Actor
2011	Devadas	Devadas	
2012	Sidlingu	Sidlingu	Nominated — Filmfare Award for Best Actor – Kannada
2012	Alemari	Mohan / Paradeshi	
2012	Kalaya Tasmai Namaha	Ten	Also playback singer for the song "Khali Roadu Onti Girlu"
2012	Yaare Koogadali	Natesha	
2013	Bangari	Bangari	Also playback singer for the song "Chang Changlu Hudgeeru"
2013	Jinke Mari	Ajay	
2013	Ambara	Ajay	
2013	Bhajarangi	Himself	Special appearance in a song
2013	Kariya Kan Bitta		Cameo appearance
2014	Darling	Sathya	also producer
2014	Snake Naga	Naga	
2014	Matte Satyagraha	Sathya	
2015	BhagyaRaj	Raj	Special appearance
2016	Parapancha	Himself	Special appearance
2016	Kiragoorina Gayyaligalu	Sones	Special appearance
2016	Kala Bhairava	Baira	
2016	John Jani Janardhan	Jani	
2017	Kolar	Thangam	
2017	Mass Leader	Azim	
2018	Yogi Duniya	Yogi	
2018	Dhoolipata	Yogi	
2019	Lambodara	Lambodara	
2019	Kempe Gowda 2		
2019	Muttu Love Paaru	Muttu	
2021	Lanke	Raam	
2022	Ombattane Dikku	Channakeshava	
2022	Head Bush	Ganga	
2022	Kirik Shankar	Shankar	
2022	Naanu Adu Mattu Saroja	Gopi	
2023	Lankasura		
2024	Bachelor Party	Madhav "Maddy"	
2024	Gowri	Himself	Cameo appearance
2025	Sidlingu 2	Sidlingu	
2025	Retta Thala	Malli	Tamil film
2026	Graamaayana	Kari Bekku	
2026	Bail	Yogi Reddy	
TBA	Parimala Lodge†	TBA	Filming

=== Television ===
Year	Title	Role	Channel	Notes
2013	Bigg Boss	Guest appearance	ETV Kannada	
2014	Thaka Dhimi Tha Dancing star	Judge	ETV Kannada	
2014	Life Super Guru	Judge	Zee Kannada	
2019	Gaana Bajaana	Anchor	Star Suvarna	
