= Jahnavi Kamath =

Indian actress

- Born: Mangalore, India
- Occupation: Actress
- Years active: 2012-present

Jahnavi Kamath is an Indian actress who has worked in the Tamil and Kannada film industries. After beginning her career as a child artiste in television serials, Kamath has since appeared in feature films.

== Career ==
After graduating from Christ College, Bangalore with a degree in journalism, Jahnavi appeared in two low budget Tamil language films in 2012, Otha Veedu and Pudhiya Kaaviyam. As a child artiste, Jahnavi worked on K. M. Chaitanya's Kannada television serial, Mugilu and consequently made her Kannada senior debut by featuring in the director's film, Paraari (2013). Her second Kannada film, Bhagyaraj, which she signed in 2013, has progressed slowly through production and is yet to have a theatrical release.

In 2015, she returned to feature in the television serial Preethi Enderanu alongside actor Shrunga, which was also directed by Chaitanya.

== Filmography ==
Films

Year	Film	Role	Language	Notes
2012	Otha Veedu		Tamil	
2012	Pudhiya Kaaviyam		Tamil	
2013	Parari		Kannada	
2016	Bhagyaraj		Kannada	

Television

- Mugilu
- Preethi Enderanu (2015)
