= Parari (2013 film) =

2013 Kannada language film

- VCD cover
- Directed by: K. M. Chaitanya
- Written by: K. M. Chaitanya; Mohan Shankar (dialogue)
- Produced by: Sumith Kombra
- Starring: Shravanth; Shuba Poonja; Jahnavi Kamath; Shrunga; Bullet Prakash
- Cinematography: H. C. Venu
- Edited by: P. Haridas
- Music by: J. Anoop Seelin
- Production companies: Shakthi Movies Wordwide; Kayaka Media
- Release date: 19 April 2013
- Country: India
- Language: Kannada

Parari is a 2013 Indian Kannada-language comedy film directed by K. M. Chaitanya starring Shravanth, Shuba Poonja, Jahnavi Kamath, Shrunga and Bullet Prakash in lead roles.

== Cast ==
- Shravanth as Karan
- Shuba Poonja as Urmila
- Jahnavi Kamath as Shwetha
- Shrunga as Anantha
- Bullet Prakash as Peede Obaih
- Arun Sagar as Arun alias Kanti Subba Reddy
- Sharath Lohithaswa as Samanth
- Rangayana Raghu as Vishwanath
- Umashree as Peede Obaih's mother
- P. D. Sathish Chandra

== Music ==
Parari (ಪರಾರಿ)

Soundtrack album by J. Anoop Seelin
- Released: 2013
- Recorded: 2013
- Genre: Feature film soundtrack
- Length: 20:32
- Language: Kannada

Official audio
- Parari - Full Album on YouTube

Track listing
| No. | Title | Singer(s) | Length |
|---|---|---|---|
| 1. | "Muddu Muddagi" | Anuradha Bhat | 4:16 |
| 2. | "Parari" | Shankar Mahadevan | 4:07 |
| 3. | "Beeja Beeja" | Sunita Murli | 4:19 |
| 4. | "Neenendaru Naane" | Indu Nagaraj | 3:53 |
| 5. | "Kailasa Kailuntu" | J. Anoop Seelin | 4:37 |
| Total length: | | | 20:32 |

== Reception ==
=== Critical response ===
The Times of India scored the film at 3 out of 5 stars and says "Full marks to Shrunga and Shravanth for their excellent performance. Shubha Poonja excels as TV actress. HC Venu’s camerawork is brilliant. Anoop Sileen’s music has some catchy tunes". Y. Maheswara Reddy of DNA scored the film at 3 out of 5 stars and says "Parari apart is that it’s very different from formula Kannada films. While logic isn’t what drives the film, its script keeps the humour quotient high, right till the end. Could it be that situational comedies in Kannada films are finally maturing? Supported by Anoop Silen’s music and HC Venu’s cinematography, Parari is a must-watch and especially in the theatres" Bangalore Mirror scored the film at 2.5 out of 5 stars and says "cinematographer HC Venu forgot the lights or there was some problem with the satellite telecast, the film looked like it was shot under a giant umbrella. It is not every week that young Kannada audience gets a chance to grow up watching a movie. But they deserve much better". A Shardhha of The New Indian Express wrote "Anoop Seelin's has come out with a good mix of music. Venu has done a good job with his cinematography. The Verdict: If comedy is appealing without any logic in the story, Parari is good for a weekend entertainment". A critic from Deccan Herald wrote "Chaitanya’s Parari keeps the viewer entertained while steering clear of serious issues. Time to leave disquiet and worries behind then".
