= Shamitha Malnad =

Indian singer

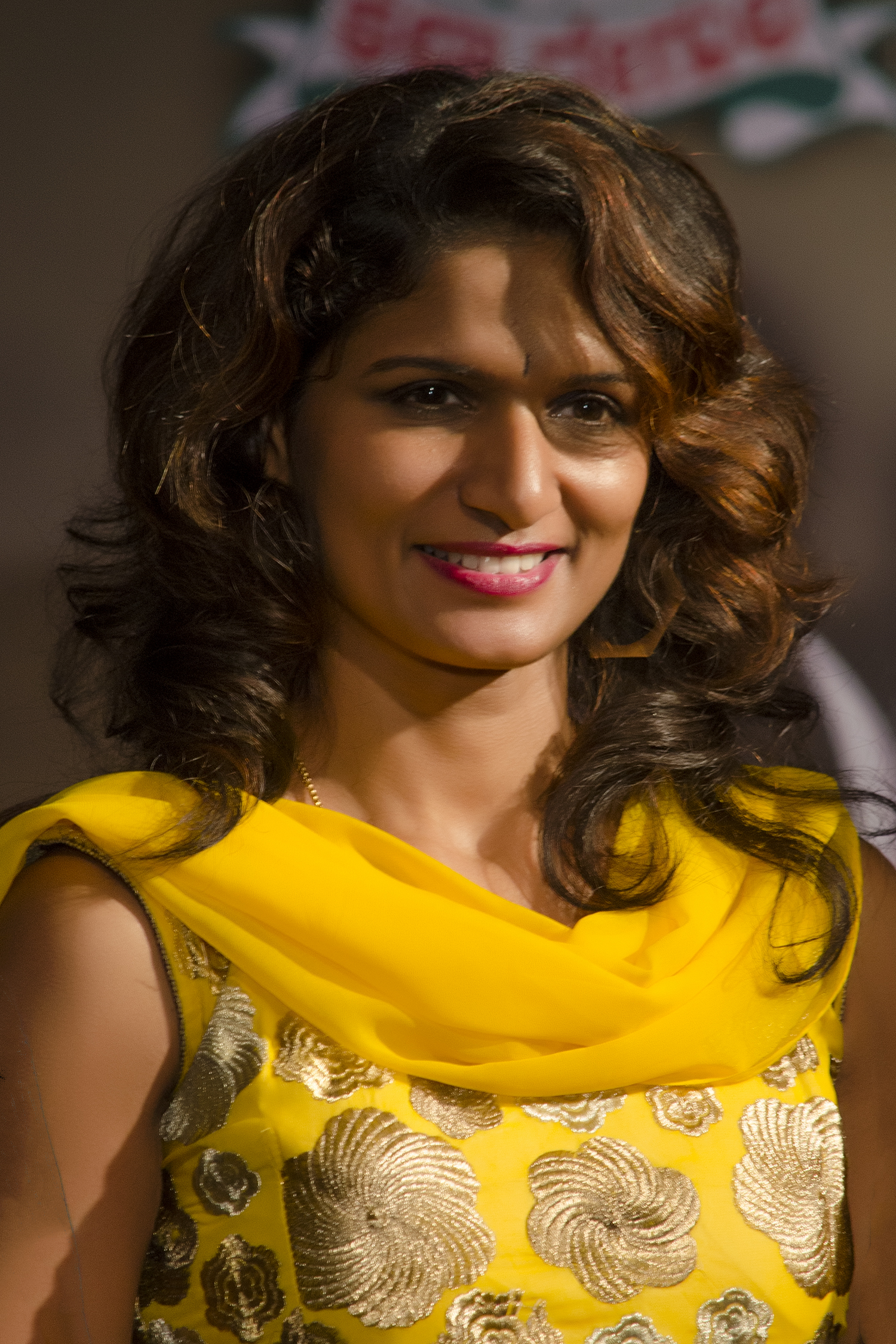
- Born: Thirtahalli, Shivamogga, Karnataka, India
- Education: Bachelor of Dental Surgery
- Alma mater: KIMS, Bangalore
- Occupations: Playback singer, composer
- Years active: 1994–present
- Website: drshamithamalnad.com

Shamitha Malnad is a composer, and playback singer. She works in the Kannada film industry, and in Sugama Sangeetha and Devotional albums.

== Career ==
Shamitha Malnad was first introduced to the film music by music director Gurukiran in the film Ninagaagi in 2002. She has worked for music directors such as Hamsalekha, Gurukiran, V. Harikrishna, Mano Murthy, and others. Has worked as a Music Director for 10 feature films, Bekku, Thulung Neer ( Kodava) Mooka Nayaka, Bayalatada Bheemanna, Crack, Amruthamathi, Thayi Kastur Gandhi, Makkala thanteg bandre hushar, Chinnara Chandra, Swapna Mantapa

== Discography ==
Year	Song name	Film / Album	Composer
2003	Nannali Naanilla	Kariya	Gurukiran
2003	Nee Nanna Appikolalavva	Kutumba	Gurukiran
2003	Chakkar Haaku	Gokarna	Gurukiran
2003	Magale Magale	Laali Haadu	Sadhu Kokila
2003	Pyar De	Partha	Gurukiran
2004	Chitte Chitte	Ranga SSLC	Sandeep Chowta
2004	Bhoomi Yake Thiruguthaithe	Ranga SSLC	Sandeep Chowta
2005	Jopana Raathri	Rama Shama Bhama	Gurukiran
2006	Alele Tunta Maado	Chellata	Gurukiran
2006	Tentalli Titanic	Madana	Yuvan Shankar Raja
2006	Dhina Dhina	Thangigagi	Sadhu Kokila
2006	Innu Yaka Baralillava	Hubballi	A. R. Hemanth
2007	Se Se Se Nanna	Bhoopathi	V. Harikrishna
2007	Apple Apple	Lava Kusha	Gurukiran
2007	Hogona Hogona	Ekadantha	Gurukiran
2008	Sum Sumke	Paramesha Panwala	V. Harikrishna
2008	Aitalakadi	Gaja	V. Harikrishna
2008	Elliruve Yaare Neenu	Meravanige	V. Manohar
2009	Madhura Pisumaatige	Birugaali	Arjun Janya
2009	Kuchu Kuchu	Preethse Preethse	Anoop Seelin
2010	Jugaari	Jugaari	Arjun Janya
2010	Kaapaadiko	Nam Areal Ond Dina	Arjun Janya
2010	Seere Nerige Sari	Cheluveye Ninne Nodalu	V. Harikrishna
2010	Yeri Mele Yeri	Super	V. Harikrishna
2010	Kabadi Kabadi	Aptharakshaka	Gurukiran
2010	Kabadi Kabadi (Remix)	Aptharakshaka	Gurukiran
2010	Sukumaari	Mylari	Gurukiran
2010	Mylapura Mylari	Mylari	Gurukiran
2010	Vandanalu Vandanalu	Nagavalli	Gurukiran
2010	Olave Olave	Mr. Theertha	Gurukiran
2010	Yaako Dil	Punda	G. V. Prakash Kumar
2011	Hale Radio	Kempe Gowda	Arjun Janya
2011	Jhum Jhum Maiyella	Shrimathi	Ghantadi Krishna
2011	Kalli Neenu	Dandam Dashagunam	V. Harikrishna
2011	Manase Manase	Saarathi	V. Harikrishna
2011	Kittappa Kittappa	Saarathi	V. Harikrishna
2011	Neerige Baare Chenni	Jarasandha	Arjun Janya
2011	Bhavalokada Rayabharige	Johny Mera Naam Preethi Mera Kaam	V. Harikrishna
2012	Jaya Jaya Jackettu	Rambo	Arjun Janya
2012	By-2 Bedsheetali	Romeo	Arjun Janya
2013	Loveenalli Bidre	Raja Huli	Hamsalekha
2013	Play Boy	Love Cycle	Agastya
2014	Dabba Song	Darling	Arjun Janya
2015	Thinthale Thinthale	Muddu Manase	Vineeth Raj Menon
2017	Sakkare Hange	Upendra Matte Baa	V. Sridhar
2017	Meese Bittivni	Pataki	Arjun Janya
2018	Kuttu Kuttu	Victory 2	Arjun Janya
2018	Chuttu Chuttu	Raambo 2	Arjun Janya
2024	Baila Baila	Hiranya	Judah Sandhy

== Awards ==
- 2009 - Filmfare Award for Best Female Playback Singer – Kannada - "Madhura Pisumaatige (Birugaali)
- 2015 - Karnataka State Film Award for Best Female Playback Singer - "Thalamalada Maleyalli" (Bekku)
