= Ziddi (2013 film) =

2013 Indian film by R.Anantha Raju

- Theatrical release poster
- Directed by: R. Anantha Raju
- Written by: M. Sindhuraj
- Based on: Puthiya Mukham (2009) by Diphan
- Produced by: Vijay Surana
- Starring: Prajwal Devraj; Aindrita Ray; Thilak Shekar; Aishwarya Nag
- Cinematography: Niranjan Babu
- Edited by: Sanjeeva Reddy
- Music by: Giridhar Diwan
- Production company: Om Shanthivijay Productions
- Release date: 22 March 2013
- Running time: 140 Minutes
- Country: India
- Language: Kannada

Ziddi is a 2013 Indian Kannada-language masala film written by M. Sindhuraj and directed by R. Anantha Raju and produced by Vijay Surana. It stars Prajwal Devraj, Aindrita Ray, Thilak Shekar and Aishwarya Nag in lead roles. The film is a remake of 2009 Malayalam film Puthiya Mukham.

== Plot ==
Krishnakumar is a resident of Theerthahalli. Along with his studies, he pursues a career as a percussionist and teaches the mridangam to local students. He is in love with Sridevi, who is the daughter of Krishna's family friend where their relationship is supported by both families. Kichu moves on to the city of Bangalore to enroll at an engineering college. Sudhi is a senior student and the youngest of two gangster brothers Mahi and Giri, and also pursues a real estate business and crimes associated with it. In all his endeavours on the campus, Sudhi is supported by his brothers. Sahana, SI Shivaram's daughter joins the engineering college. Sudhi is in love with her and to win her love plays the gentleman role, concealing and temporarily stopping all his illegal activities. Krishna wins the heart of the everyone in the college. Sudhi suspects that Sahana is attracted to Krishna, so he moves fast and sends his brothers with an official proposal to Sahana's family.

They accept the proposal and force the reluctant Sahana to agree to it. However, she stipulates a condition: there will be no marriage immediately. Sudhi has to wait for four years for the marriage; she will have her freedom for these four years. The freedom of Sahana and the way she exercises it makes Sudhi jealous and suspicious. Sudhi wants to scare Krishna out of the college. He arranges an attack on him at the college hostel and assaults him; as a result, Krishna is severely wounded and apparently receives a blow on his head, where he appears to turn mad and attacks his own friend who tried to rescue him and is admitted to a hospital and a doctor reveals that Krishna is suffering from a flashback phenomenon. When Krishna was young, he had witnessed the death of his younger brother, who was hit by a bus and traumatic incidents like this will turn him violent. Sridevi's family disapproves of the marriage following this. His own family does not want him to go to college anymore, but his father supports him, urges him to go back and achieve something in life.

Krishna arrives at the college where he thrashes Sudhi and his friends and warns him. Sudhi's brothers turn in for help. Krishna sends Sudhi's eldest brother to the hospital, mortally wounded. He is put in the ICU for observation and is reportedly in a coma. Shivarama (who is in cahoots with Mahi and Giri) arrests Krishna and takes him to the police station. Krishna learns that he is going to be transported to the sub-jail where his execution is planned. Krishna turns violent and storms the police station. He is hit by a policeman from behind and apparently falls unconscious, but it is only a ruse, where he is rushed to the hospital. Krishna escapes from the cops. Sudhi kidnaps Sahana and a final showdown ensues at an abandoned construction site where a heated argument and close-combat ensues which leads to Sudhi's death and Krishna walks away with Sahana, who has now fallen for Krishna.

== Cast ==
- Prajwal Devraj as Krishna
- Aindrita Ray as Sahana
- Thilak Shekar as Sudhi
- Aishwarya Nag as Sridevi
- Srinivasa Murthy
- Sharath Lohithaswa as Mahendra (Mahi)
- Suchendra Prasad
- Ashok
- Joe Simon

== Music ==
Ziddi (ಜಿದ್ದಿ)

Soundtrack album by Giridhar Diwan
- Released: 2013
- Recorded: 2013
- Genre: Feature film soundtrack
- Length: 15: 99
- Language: Kannada

Official audio
- Ziddi - Full Album on YouTube

All music is composed by Giridhar Diwan.

Track listing
| No. | Title | Singer(s) | Length |
|---|---|---|---|
| 1. | "Dav Dav Dav" | Tippu, Akshata Badami | 4:22 |
| 2. | "Kuhu Kuhu Aaha" | Giridhar Divan | 3:48 |
| 3. | "Olavaade Neenu" | Nitin Acharya, Swetha Mohan | 4:19 |
| 4. | "Yadukula Murali" | Ajay Warrior | 4:10 |
| Total length: | | | 15:99 |

== Reception ==
=== Critical response ===
The Times of India scored the film at 2.5 out of 5 stars and says "Prajwal has shown maturity in acting with excellent expressions, Aindrita impresses you with her dialogue delivery. Aishwarya Nag is lovely as the girl next door. Tilak has done a good job as a villain. Music by Giridhar Divan has some melodious tunes". A. Sharadhaa of The New Indian Express scored the film at 2.5 out of 5 stars and wrote "Technically, there is nothing much to boast about. Scoring music for the film is Giridhar Diwan who has given mixed combination of retro, devotional and contemporary tunes. The rest of the departments are average". Bangalore Mirror scored the film at 2 out of 5 stars and wrote "The film neither carries the mood of the intended narrative nor is it entertaining. The film virtually ends in the interval. In fact, the 'interval' card could have been replaced by 'The End,' card. The second half of the film is a long wait for the climax fight that you know is inevitable".
