= Chetan Chandra =

Indian actor

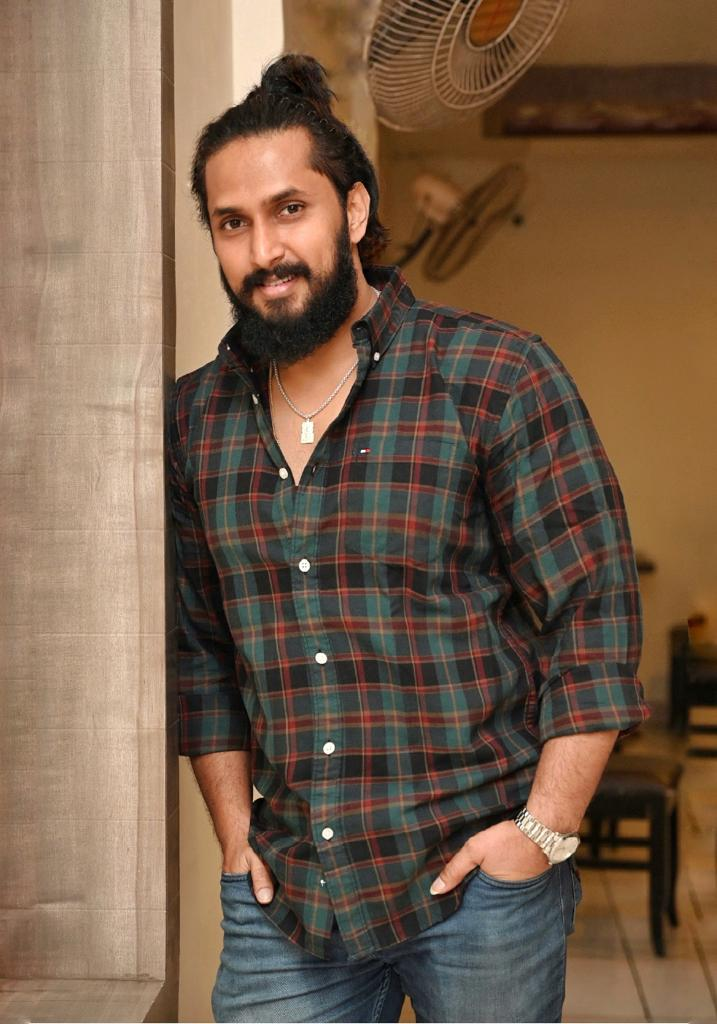
- Born: 10 April 1986 (age 40); Bangalore, Karnataka, India
- Occupation: Actor
- Years active: 2008–present

Chetan Chandra (born 10 April 1986) is an Indian actor working in the Kannada film industry.

== Early life and family ==
Chetan Chandra was born to K. B. Ramachandra and B. N. Anusuya. K. B. Ramachandra is a mining engineer in Malaysia. Chandra is a graduate in Information Science Engineering. He is married to Rachana Hegade. He has a brother, Nitin Chandra.

== Career ==
He made his acting debut in the 2008 released film, PUC alongside Harshika Poonacha, but was more noticed for the film Premism (2010). For the film Kumbha Rashi, he underwent a rigorous workout to develop eight pack abs.

He has signed Nindru Kolvaan, a Tamil film directed by V. P. Shankar.

== Filmography ==
Year	Film Title	Role	Notes
2008	PUC	Bhavish	
2010	Premism	Nithin	
2011	Rajadhani	Vinay	
2011	Jarasandha	Chethan	
2013	Kumbha Rashi	Madesha	
2013	Huchudagaru	Shiva	
2015	Plus	Vivek	
2015	Jaathre	Kiran	
2017	Samyuktha 2	Tejas	
2019	Bazar	Chethan	
2021	Shardula		
2023	Melody Drama		
2024	Prabhutva		
2025	Sanju Weds Geetha 2		Special appearance
