= Karm Chawla =

Indian cinematographer and filmmaker

- Born: Karm Chawla; 13 October 1985 (age 40)
- Education: Hansraj College; St. George's College, Mussoorie
- Occupations: Cinematographer; Director
- Years active: 2014–present

Karm Chawla is an Indian cinematographer and director who primarily works in Kannada cinema. His notable work in the cult-classics Ulidavaru Kandanthe (2014), Kirik Party (2016), and Avane Srimannarayana (2019) have been highly acclaimed. He made his directorial debut with the Kannada sports drama 10, starring Vinay Rajkumar.

== Personal life ==
Karm received his early education at St. George's College, Mussoorie. At Hansraj College, Delhi University, he pursued B.A. English Honours. He is also an alumnus of the esteemed L.V. Prasad Film & Television Academy.

== Filmography ==
Key
†	Denotes films that have not yet been released

Year	Film	Director	Producer	Cinematographer	Writer	Language	Notes
2014	Ulidavaru Kandanthe			Yes		Kannada	
2015	Vascodigama			Yes		Kannada	
2016	Run Anthony			Yes		Kannada	
2016	Kirik Party			Yes		Kannada	
2018	Humble Politician Nograj			Yes		Kannada	
2019	Yaana			Yes		Kannada	
2019	Avane Srimannarayana			Yes		Kannada	
2021	Chaavu Kaburu Challaga			Yes		Telugu	
2022	Sakutumba Sametha			Yes		Kannada	
2022	Pakka Commercial			Yes		Telugu	
2022	10	Yes		Yes		Kannada	Debut film as Director
2024	Eagle			Yes		Telugu	
2025	Richard Antony: Lord of the Sea †			Yes		Kannada	
