= Tarak (film) =

2017 film directed by Prakash

- Theatrical release poster
- Directed by: Prakash
- Screenplay by: Prakash; M. S. Abishek
- Story by: Mahesh Rao
- Produced by: Lakshana Dushyanth
- Starring: Darshan; Sruthi Hariharan; Shanvi Srivastava; Devraj
- Cinematography: A. V. Krishna Kumar
- Edited by: Sachin B. Ravi
- Music by: Arjun Janya
- Production company: Sri Chowdeshwari Cine Creations
- Distributed by: Sri Jai Mata Combines
- Release date: 29 September 2017
- Running time: 145 minutes
- Country: India
- Language: Kannada

Tarak is a 2017 Indian Kannada-language melodrama film directed by Prakash and produced by Dushyanth. The film features Darshan, Sruthi Hariharan and Shanvi Srivastava in the lead roles. Devaraj and Sumithra feature in important supporting roles. The film Soundtrack and background score was composed by Arjun Janya and cinematography is by A. V. Krishna Kumar.

The project marks the first film in the combination of Darshan with Prakash of Milana fame and Darshan's 49th film to be released. Upon release, film met with positive reviews with the praise towards cast performances. The filming began on 1 March 2017 in Bengaluru. Further, the shooting took place in Malaysia and for the song sequences, the team moved to Switzerland and Italy.

== Plot ==
Tarak meets Meera who falls for him. Later he too, reciprocates it. But one day, she challenges him to live without her for two months – while no one should learn about them. If he doesn't fall for others in that time, she will rebelieve him. He goes back to India to meet his grandfather, also Tarakram. Surprisingly his family fixes his marriage with Sneha who lives with them. Tarak must accept this because his grandfather would die soon. He tells Sneha about Meera and she accepts his decision. They then visit Meera. There they see that Meera is affected with cancer and will be dying soon. She had challenged him so that he would not know about her disease. She also gets her father remarried so that after her death, he would not feel lonely. Tarak and Sneha get emotional at this. Meera dies in the arms of Tarak. Tarak and Sneha return to India. Tarak says that he cannot marry her. So his family plans that Tarak will act like tying the Mangalsutra and Sneha's mother would tie it. While tying Tarak remembers Meera's words, "More than the memories of people we have lost, happiness of people who are there with us is important". He feels a drop of tear fall on his hand, which is from the eyes of Sneha's mother. To everybody's surprise, Tarak himself ties the knot. Everybody is happy upon seeing this.

The film ends with Tarak, Sneha and Meera (Tarak's daughter) visiting Meera's burial place and making a video call to the family; his grandfather is alive because of his desire to see his great-granddaughter's wedding, while the doctor who treated him died.

== Cast ==
- Darshan as Tarak Ram
- Sruthi Hariharan as Sneha
- Shanvi Srivastava as Meera
- Devaraj as Tarak Ram, Tarak's Grandfather
- Sumithra as Sarasamma
- Sharath Lohitashwa
- Kuri Prathap
- Sangeetha
- Avinash
- Kuldeep
- Aravind Rao
- All Ok
- Master Mahendra
- Rohith Nagesh
- Chitra Shenoy
- Bhagyashri Rao
- Rajesh Nataranga
- Jasmine Kaar (in the song "Kudi Maga")

== Production ==
=== Filming ===
In November 2016, it was reported that the official launch for the Darshan's 49th venture with director Prakash would begin on 9 December 2016. Prakash, who was busy in the pre-production work, had already finalised the main technicians for the film. His brother-in-law Dushyanth who had earlier produced Milana and Shree was roped in to produce the film. Since Darshan was involved in the shoot for his previous venture, Chakravarthy, the team made the elaborate arrangements for the film to officially begin. The second schedule of the shoot took place in Malaysia. Following this, for some of the songs shoot, the unit moved to Switzerland and Italy.

=== Casting ===
After having worked with successful stars like Shiva Rajkumar, Puneeth Rajkumar and Vijay Raghavendra, Prakash had planned to work with Darshan and approached him with a new family entertainer script for which the actor readily agreed. His brother-in-law, K. S. Dushyanth, was ready to finance the project for the third time after Milana and Shree. Actress Sruthi Hariharan was approached to play one of the two female leads in the project. Newcomer Rashmika Mandanna was selected to play the second female lead role even before the release of her debut film, Kirik Party. Citing dates issues, Rashmika opted out from the project and Shanvi Srivastava was replaced in her place. Veteran actors Devaraj and Sumithra were selected to play the parent roles.

== Soundtrack ==
Tarak

Soundtrack album by Arjun Janya
- Released: 17 August 2017
- Recorded: 2017
- Genre: Feature film soundtrack
- Length: 23:12
- Label: Lahari Music
- Producer: Arjun Janya

Arjun Janya has composed the songs and the soundtrack. Soundtrack consists of 6 songs. V. Nagendra Prasad, Jayanth Kaikini and Hari Santhosh have penned the lyrics.

Track list
No.	Title	Lyrics	Singer(s)	Length
1.	"Baa Baaro"	V. Nagendra Prasad	Vyasaraj Sosale	04:10
2.	"Birugaali Yondige"	Jayanth Kaikini	Armaan Malik	03:47
3.	"Mathaadu Nee"	Jayanth Kaikini	Armaan Malik, Shreya Ghoshal	03:52
4.	"Sanje Hotthu"	Hari Santhosh	Vijay Prakash, Indu Nagaraj	03:52
5.	"Ta Ta Taraka"	V. Nagendra Prasad	Neeti Mohan	03:22
6.	"Kudi Maga"	Hari Santhosh	Vyasaraj Sosale	04:09
Total length:				23:12

== Release ==
The first look of the film was released on 30 March 2017 and the film was released on 29 September 2017.

== Reception ==
A. Sharadhaa of The New Indian Express rated the film 3.5/5 stars and wrote, "The film is slow in parts and the second half is where the drama sets in. This moving story is well told but the comedy could have been better handled. There are times when a director tailors a film for a star but, in Tarak, Darshan remains a director’s actor." Sunayana Suresh of The Times of India gave the film 3/5 stars and wrote, "This film might not be the regular masala fare that Darshan fans are used to, but the sentiments and story are something different for them, which is definitely worth a watch. It could have had some deft editing to make it a more crisp tale, but that can be pardoned since there is no excessive jingoism".

Shyam Prasad S. of Bangalore Mirror gave it 2.5/5 stars and wrote, "Tarak could have been a much better film with the same story only if the scenes were crafted and presented convincingly. Except for a scene in the first half and a few towards the end of the film, it does not happen. There are also some unnecessary and silly scenes stuffed into the film. Each of these involves Kuri Pratap. The comedy track is unfit in any film." Shashiprasad S. M. of Deccan Chronicle wrote, "The first half of Tarak is just an ‘International show’ which barely takes off until post interval. Further, there is hardly any excitement in it [...] Nothing great or new but a watchable family drama." Karthik Keramalu of The News Minute wrote, "Tarak works well in parts because of the grandfather-grandson story, but should ideally have been edited to cut out all the unnecessary bits around this."
