= Shri (film) =

Kannada film

- Theatrical Release Poster
- Directed by: Prakash
- Written by: Prakash; M. S. Abhishek
- Produced by: K.S. Dushyanth
- Starring: Vijay Raghavendra; Jennifer Kotwal
- Cinematography: S. Krishna; K. Krishnakumar
- Edited by: S. Manohar
- Music by: Valisha-Sandeep
- Production company: Sri Chowdeshwari Cine Creations
- Release date: 6 January 2006
- Running time: 148 mins
- Country: India
- Language: Kannada

Shri is a 2006 Indian Kannada-language action film directed by Prakash. The film stars Vijay Raghavendra and Jennifer Kotwal. The film received positive reviews for its action sequences. However, the film was a box office failure.

== Plot ==
A software professional is involved in a bank robbery in Bangkok, masterminded by a crook. She accidentally meets Shree in a shopping mall and follows him for safety. She also comes to Bangalore with him where Shree learns of her predicament. He decides to save her from the criminals. Meanwhile, a probe team led by an officer from Bangkok zeroes in on them in the robbery case.

== Cast ==
- Vijay Raghavendra as Shreekanth
- Jennifer Kotwal as Deepa
- Rahul Dev as Shetty
- Avinash as Rajashekar
- Anant Nag
- Bullet Prakash
- Komal Kumar as Shankar
- Sathyajith as Subramaniam
- Shakeela
- Doddanna as a police constable
- Vinaya Prasad as Shree's mother
- Ramesh Bhat as Shree's father
- Vijay as Shetty's henchman
- Meera Verma in a special appearance ("Joke Joke Andrunu")

== Production ==
The film was launched on 21 May 2005. Vijay Raghavendra sported long hair which he initially grew out for Rishi (2005), and he was trained in Muay Thai for twenty-five days in Bangkok. Jennifer Kotwal plays a software engineer in the film. The film was reported to be a "big-budget" film. The stunts were choreographed by Ravi Varma. California-based Meera Verma shot for a song in Alaska alongside 25 dancers. The film was shot in Bangkok and Pattaya, Thailand for forty five days and remaining filming was held at Bangalore. The filming went on for twelve months.

== Soundtrack ==
All lyrics are written by Kaviraj; all music is composed by Valisha-Sandeep.

| No. | Title | Singers | Length |
|---|---|---|---|
| 1. | "Yaaro Neenu" | Rajesh Krishnan, K. S. Chithra | 5:52 |
| 2. | "Masthana Masthana" | Sonu Nigam | 5:32 |
| 3. | "Deepa Deepa Kanthumba" | Rajesh Krishnan, K. S. Chithra | 4:59 |
| 4. | "Joke Joke Andrunu" | Sunidhi Chauhan | 4:52 |
| 5. | "Maniye Maniye" | Shankar Mahadevan | 4:45 |
| Total length: | | | 26:00 |

== Release and reception ==
The film was released with forty prints.

R. G. Vijayasarathy of IANS wrote that "If you are an action film hero, you may end up liking Sree but it may well disappoint you if you look at the background of its director". A critic from Rediff.com wrote that "Sree is a film for lover of action. But is it enough from a director like Prakash?" The film was reviewed by Deccan Herald. A critic from Chitraloka.com wrote that "This is a must watch film for the strong effort put in by Prakash and his team". A critic from Viggy opined that "Over all, SHREE is a good movie". A critic from webindia123 wrote that "Thai martial arts is clearly not sufficient to make it a complete thriller".
