= Ananthu =

Ananthu may refer to:

- Ananthu (screenwriter), Indian Tamil-language screenwriter
- Ananthu (singer), Indian Tamil-language singer
- Ananthu vs Nusrath, Indian Kannada-language film
