= Yuva Rajkumar =

Indian actor born 1993

- Born: Guru Rajkumar; 23 April 1993 (age 33); Bengaluru, Karnataka, India
- Education: Ramaiah Institute of Technology, Bengaluru (BArch)
- Occupations: Actor; producer; playback singer
- Years active: 1994–1995; 2015–present
- Father: Raghavendra Rajkumar
- Relatives: See Rajkumar family

Yuva Rajkumar (born 23 April 1993) is an Indian actor, producer, and playback singer in the Kannada film industry.

== Career ==
Yuva worked as a child artist in Odahuttidavaru (1994) and Om (1995) alongside his brother Vinay Rajkumar. He worked behind the scenes for Siddhartha (2015) and Run Antony (2016) both starring Vinay, and was credited as a producer for the latter film. He made his debut as a lead actor with Yuva (2024). Regarding his performance in the film, a critic from The Times of India wrote that "Yuva is Yuva Rajkumar’s show all the way; he fights, acts, dances, romances, wrestles, fights some more, and even shows an emotional arc. He ticks all the boxes of a commercial hero. The movie is written for him and he delivers a very mature performance in his debut film. His arrival marks the entry of a bankable angry young man to the industry".

== Personal life ==
Yuva completed Bachelor of Architecture at the Ramaiah Institute of Technology, Bengaluru.

== Filmography ==
Key
†	Denotes films that have not yet been released

Year	Title	Role	Notes	Ref.
1994	Odahuttidavaru	Ramanna and Ganga's younger son	Child artist; credited as Master Guru Raghavendra	
1995	Om	Sathya and Madhu's son	Child artist; uncredited	
2016	Run Antony	—N/a	As producer; credited as Guru Rajkumar	
2024	Yuva	Yuva		
2025	Ekka	Mutthu		

== Discography ==
Year	Film	Song	Composer	Co-singers	Ref.
2022	James	"Trademark"	Charan Raj	MC Vickey, Aditi Sagar, Chandan Shetty, Sharmila	
