= Vamshi (film) =

2008 Indian Kannada-language action drama film

- Theatrical film poster
- Directed by: Prakash
- Written by: M. S. Ramesh (dialogues)
- Screenplay by: Prakash, M. S. Abhishek
- Story by: Prakash, M. S. Abhishek
- Produced by: Parvathamma Rajkumar
- Starring: Puneeth Rajkumar; Nikita Thukral; Lakshmi
- Narrated by: Upendra
- Cinematography: K. Krishnakumar
- Edited by: Deepu. S. Kumar
- Music by: R. P. Patnaik
- Production company: Sri Chakreshwari Combines
- Distributed by: Sri Vajreshwari combines
- Release date: 2 October 2008
- Country: India
- Language: Kannada

Vamshi is an Indian Kannada-language action drama film directed by Prakash and produced by Parvathamma Rajkumar under Sri Chakreshwari Combines. The film stars Puneeth Rajkumar, alongside Lakshmi, Nikita Thukral, Ravi Kale, Avinash Yelandur and Rajendra Karanth. The music was composed by R. P. Patnaik, while the cinematography and editing were handled by Krishna Kumar and Deepu S. Kumar respectively.

Vamshi was released on 2 October 2008 and became a commercial success at the box office.

== Plot ==
Vamshi, a short-tempered trainee in police academy, is the son of Kotnal "KR" Ramanna, a former crime boss recently murdered by his rival gangster Jayachandra. When Vamshi is about to be transferred to Bangalore for posting, Vamshi's anger and his parentage, along with DCP Reddy's involvement with Jayachandra, ends Vamshi's police interview after it is botched. A dejected Vamshi is forced to become the leader of KR's gang, where he is helped by another politician to kill Jayachandra and other enemies. While doing so, Vamshi drifts away from his mother and his girlfriend Sharadha. After killing Jayachandra, Vamshi learns about his mother's tragic past and also about the importance of love and affection of the near ones. Vamshi changes back to his normal life, but his own gang and the politician, who sided with Reddy, turn against him as they want Vamshi to be in the syndicate business. A fight ensues between the group and Vamshi, where Vamshi kills the gang and Reddy. Finally, Vamshi takes up a job as a school teacher and lives happily with his mother and Sharu.

== Cast ==
- Puneeth Rajkumar as Vamshi
- Nikita Thukral as Shaaru
- Lakshmi as Parvati, Vamshi's mother
- Chitra Shenoy as Janaki, Sharu's mother
- Sundar Raj as Mukunda Iyengar, Sharu's father
- Komal Kumar as Vamshi's sidekick
- Ravi Kale as DCP Reddy
- Rajendra Karanth as Jayachandra
- Avinash as politician
- Haridas G.
- Vijay Koundinya
- Arasu Maharaj
- Suresh Mangalore
- Ganesh Rao Kesarkar
- Shankar Narayan
- Madhu Mandagere
- Mallesh Gowda
- Tumkur Mohan
- Shankar Rao
- Vidya Murthy
- B. Jaya
- Jolly Bastin
- N. K. Vishwanath
- Y. R. Ashwath Narayan

== Soundtrack ==
Vamshi

Soundtrack album by R. P. Patnaik
- Released: 3 August 2008
- Recorded: 2008
- Genre: Feature film soundtrack
- Length: 27:31
- Label: Aananda Audio
External audio
- Official Audio Jukebox on YouTube

The background score and soundtrack of the film was composed by R. P. Patnaik, with lyrics for the soundtrack penned by V. Nagendra Prasad and Ram Narayan. The song "Thayi Thayi" was reused from the 1993 Kannada film Hoovu Hannu, which also starred Lakshmi. The soundtrack album comprises six tracks.

No.	Title	Lyrics	Singer(s)	Length
1.	"Bhuvanam Sharanam"	V. Nagendra Prasad	Sonu Nigam Faiyaz Khan	4:53
2.	"Jothe Jotheyali"	Ram Narayan	Puneeth Rajkumar, Shreya Ghoshal	4:58
3.	"Yenaytho Idho"	V. Nagendra Prasad	Sonu Nigam, R. P. Patnaik	4:16
4.	"Amalu Amalu"	Jayanth Kaikini	Rajesh Krishnan, Harini Sudhakar	4:26
5.	"Mayagathi Lingamma"	V. Nagendra Prasad	Sonu Nigam, Malathi	4:11
6.	"Thayi Thayi"	Hamsalekha	Dr. Rajkumar	4:37
Total length:				27:31

== Reception ==
R. G. Vijayasarathy of Rediff wrote "Vamshi does not stand up to the expectations it has raised. An average fare." Bangalore Mirror wrote "A disappointment overall from the Puneeth-Prakash duo whose last film Milana ran for a year."

=== Box office ===
Vamshi completed 100 days in few centers across the state.
