= Padaiyaanda Maaveeraa =

Upcoming Tamil film

- Theatrical release poster
- Directed by: V. Gowthaman
- Written by: V. Gowthaman
- Produced by: Nirmal Saravanaraj; S. Krishnamurthy
- Starring: V. Gowthaman; Pujita Ponnada; P. Samuthirakani
- Cinematography: Gopi Jagadeeshwaran
- Edited by: Raja Mohammad
- Music by: G. V. Prakash Kumar (Soundtrack); Sam C. S. (Background)
- Production company: V. K. Productions
- Release date: 19 September 2025
- Running time: 152 minutes
- Country: India
- Language: Tamil

Padaiyaanda Maaveeraa (transl. Great warrior who led an army) is a 2025 Indian Tamil-language political action drama film written and directed by V. Gowthaman, starring himself in the titular role and Pujita Ponnada. The film stars an ensemble cast consisting of P. Samuthirakani, Redin Kingsley, Mansoor Ali Khan, Aadukalam Naren, Saranya Ponvannan, Kabir Duhan Singh, Prabhakar, Madhusudhan Rao and others in important roles. The film produced by Nirmal Saravanaraj and S. Krishnamoorthy under their V. K. Productions banner is inspired by events from the life of Kaduvetti Guru.

Padaiyaanda Maaveeraa released in theatres on 19 September 2025.

== Plot ==
Padaiyaanda Maaveeraa follows the inspiring journey of a grassroots activist who rises to become a fearless community leader. The film explores rural politics, power struggles, and emotional moments that shaped his legacy, offering a gripping portrayal of courage, charisma, and determination.

== Cast ==
- V. Gowthaman as Kaduvetti Guru
  - Tamil Azhagan Gowthaman as Young Guru
- Pujita Ponnada as Guru's wife
- P. Samuthirakani as Jayaraman
- Redin Kingsley as Vaithi
- Mansoor Ali Khan as Kodukkan
- Aadukalam Naren as Ravichandran
- Saranya Ponvannan as Kalyani
- Kabir Duhan Singh as Businessman
- Ashutosh Rana as Singh
- Prabhakar as Inspector Ramkumar
- Madhusudhan Rao as Suryababu
- Ravi Mariya as Mahalingam
- Nizhalgal Ravi as IPS. Thiruvasagam
- Ilavarasu as Inspector Muthuramalingam
- Thalaivasal Vijay as Judge
- Sunil Reddy as Minister
- Sai Dheena as Inspector Gnanam
- Karate Raja as Veerappan (cameo appearance)
- Sridhar as Dancer (cameo appearance)

== Production ==
The film is written and directed by V. Gowthaman, who returned to direction after a 15-year hiatus, who was last seen in Magizhchi (2010), now in a film based on events from Kaduvetti Guru's life. The film stars Gowthaman himself in the lead role, alongside Pujita Ponnada as the female lead. The film is produced by Nirmal Saravanaraj and S. Krishnamoorthy under their V. K. Productions banner. Due to a directive by the court to alter the title, after a case filed by Guru's family, the movie's previous title, Maaveera, was eventually changed to its current one. The film stars an ensemble cast consisting of P. Samuthirakani, Prabhakar, Saranya Ponvannan, Aadukalam Naren, Redin Kingsley, Ilavarasu and others in important roles. Principal photography began in January 2023 and was done in places around Virudhachalam, Neyveli and Panruti.

== Music ==
Padaiyaanda Maaveeraa

Soundtrack album by G. V. Prakash Kumar
- Genre: Feature film soundtrack
- Language: Tamil
- Label: Vk Musical
- Producers: G. V. Prakash Kumar; Sam C. S.

G. V. Prakash Kumar chronology
Good Bad Ugly (2025)	Padaiyaanda Maaveeraa (2025)	Idli Kadai (2025)

Sam C. S. chronology
Blackmail (2025)	Padaiyaanda Maaveeraa (2025)	Retta Thala (2025)

Singles from Padaiyaanda Maaveeraa
- 1. "Pulikodi" Released: 9 May 2025; 2. "Ava Varuvaalaa" Released: 8 July 2025

The film has soundtracks composed by G. V. Prakash Kumar and background scored by Sam C. S. and the lyrics written by Vairamuthu. The first single "Pulikodi" was released on 9 May 2025. The second single "Ava Varuvaalaa" was released on 8 July 2025.

All lyrics are written by Vairamuthu.

Track listing
No.	Title	Lyrics	Singer(s)	Length
1.	"Pulikodi"	Vairamuthu	V. M. Mahalingam, Benny Dayal	3:50
2.	"Ava Varuvaalaa"	Lavarathan	Anthony Daasan, Jayamoorthy, Sulfath Banu sufi	4:43
3.	"Pattampoochi"	Vairamuthu	G. V. Prakash Kumar, Madhushree	4:10
4.	"Veera Padaiyaanda Veera"	Vairamuthu	Saindhavi

== Release ==
Padaiyaanda Maaveeraa released in theatres on 19 September 2025, clashing with Kiss, Shakthi Thirumagan and Thandakaaranyam. Earlier the film was scheduled to release on 23 May 2025.

== Reception ==
Maalai Malar gave 2/5 stars, praising the performances of the lead actors and the background score, while criticizing the exaggerated build-up scenes. Raghavkumar of Kalki criticised the film for deviating from the real history, and focusing mainly on the 'cinematic embellishments'.

Broadcast Media carries the film with sincerity. At times, his screen presence and body manguage remind audiences of veteran actor Vijayakanth, but he retains his individuality with grounded performance.
