= Latha Hegde =

Indian-born New Zealand actress

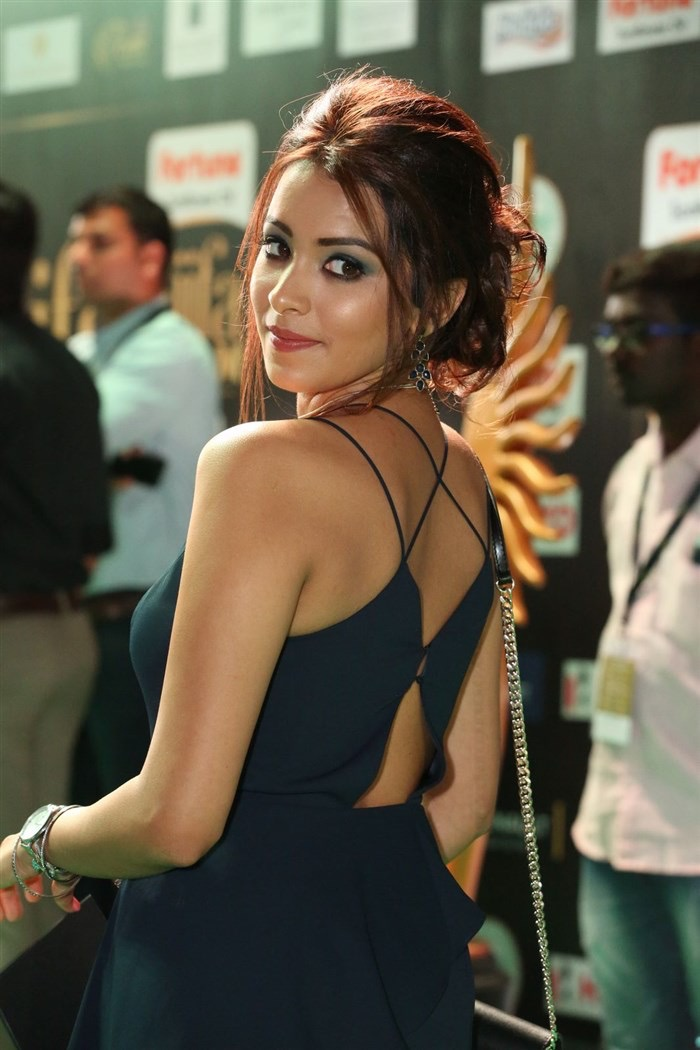
- Born: 27 May 1993 (age 33); Honnavar, Karnataka, India
- Education: Mount Roskill Grammar School
- Occupation: Actress
- Years active: 2016 - Present

Latha Hegde is an Indian-born New Zealand actress who works mainly in Kannada also works in Telugu films.

== Career ==
Hegde did her first film Tuntari in 2016, opposite Nara Rohith. She then did her first film in Tamil (which remains unreleased) Oh Andha Naatkal as a lead alongside Suhasini Maniratnam, Khushbu, Raadhika and Urvashi. Hegde then made her Kannada debut opposite Vinay Rajkumar in Ananthu vs Nusrath (2017).

== Filmography ==
Year	Film	Role	Language	Notes
2016	Tuntari	Siri	Telugu	
2017	Athiratha	Aditi	Kannada	
2018	Ananthu Vs Nusrath	Nusrath Fathima Baig	Kannada	
