= V. Gowthaman =

Indian film director

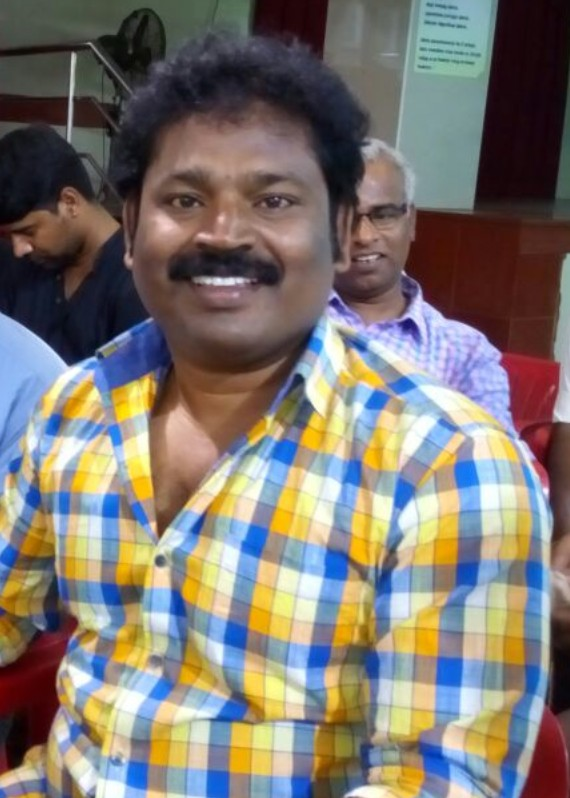
- Born: 1 January 1970 (age 56); Tittakudi, Cuddalore district, Tamil Nadu, India
- Occupations: actor, director, politician
- Years active: 1990-present

V. Gowthaman is an Indian film director and actor who has worked in Tamil films and television.

== Career ==
Gowthaman made his directorial debut with Kanave Kalayadhe (1999) starring Murali and Simran. In 2001, he started a film titled Poranthaalum Pompalaiyaa Porakkakkoodaathu with Livingston and Pandiarajan in the lead, though the film was later dropped.

After a gap he directed a eponymous teleseries for Makkal TV based on the life of serial killer Auto Shankar and Santhanakaadu based on Veerappan. He made his comeback as a director with Magizhchi (2010) in which he also made his debut as an actor. Gowthaman was working with the screenplay of the movie for 12 years. The film, received good reviews for its content and went unnoticed due to its low key release.

He went on to direct a short film called Vetti which received controversy as the police felt that it was insulting against national flag.

== Filmography ==
Year	Title	Credited as		Role	Notes
Year	Title	Director	Actor	Role	Notes
1990	Neengalum Herothan	No	Yes	Tiger' Premnath's fan	
1998	Kaadhale Nimmadhi	No	Yes	Servant	
1999	Kanave Kalaiyadhe	Yes	No	—N/a	
2002	Solla Marandha Kadhai	No	Yes	Taxi driver	
2010	Magizhchi	Yes	Yes	Thiravi	
2025	Padaiyaanda Maaveeraa	Yes	Yes	Kaduvetti Guru	

=== Television ===
As director

- Santhanakadu
- Auto Shankar

== Politics and activism ==
Gowthaman have organized and participated many protest favoring Tamil people interests. He has been part of Jallikattu protest, Cauvery water dispute, farmer related issues, katchatheevu reinstatement and other issues.

He floated a new party Tamil Perarasu Katchi and contested in 2019 by-election held in Vikravandi constituency in Tamil Nadu.
