= Youth (2026 soundtrack) =

2026 film soundtrack album

- Soundtrack album cover

Soundtrack album by G. V. Prakash Kumar
- Released: 25 March 2026
- Recorded: 2025–2026
- Studios: Divine Labs, Chennai; 2BarQ Studios, Chennai; Sounds Right Studios, Chennai; Contrabass Studios, Chennai; Kashy Records, Chennai; Atrium Sound Studios, Chennai; Sonic Island Studios, Kochi
- Genre: Feature film soundtrack
- Length: 23:47
- Language: Tamil
- Label: self-released
- Producer: G. V. Prakash Kumar

G. V. Prakash Kumar chronology
Parasakthi (2026)	Youth (2026)	Kara (2026)

Singles from Youth
- 1. "Mutta Kalakki" Released: 7 February 2026; 2. "Paranthene Penne" Released: 19 February 2026; 3. "Aasa Pulla" Released: 28 February 2026; 4. "Loveah Sollitalea" Released: 13 March 2026; 5. "Jilpanso" Released: 18 March 2026

Youth is the soundtrack album composed by G. V. Prakash Kumar to the 2026 Tamil-language coming of age romantic comedy film of the same name directed by Ken Karunas in his directorial debut and also starred in the lead role alongside Suraj Venjaramoodu, Devadarshini, Anishma Anilkumar, Meenakshi Dinesh and Priyanshi Yadav. The soundtrack featured nine songs with lyrics written by Ken, Karunas, Vignesh Srikanth, Sibiraj Chakravarthi and Eshwar Santhanalakshmi. Preceded by five singles, the soundtrack was released on 25 March 2026, six days after the film's release. The album was launched and self-released by Prakash under his own music label.

== Background ==
The film's music is composed by G. V. Prakash Kumar. Ken admitted that he needed a high-profile musician to score the film for its visibility as he felt nobody had faith in his vision and approached Prakash for the same. After hearing the script, Prakash reportedly agree to score music for the film. Prakash said that he did not take any renumeration for Youth as a mutual respect and admiration for Ken's parents Karunas and Grace, who had contributed for one of the songs.

Ken wanted new age songs for the film owing to its youthful flavor and connecting across youngsters. Much of the songs were written and performed by himself along with his friend Eshwar Santhanalakshmi. The Telugu version of the album had featured a variety of singers and lyricists, with music composers Suresh Bobbili, Sinjith Yerramilli, Vivek Sagar and Jay Krish having performed the songs.

Prakash in an interview, stated that when they approached a label to release the album, the executives offered a lower price than what he quoted as the project featured newcomers and did not have any viral songs. Hence, Prakash decided to self-release the album under his own label which he launched for the film. Youth was its maiden release of Prakash's self-titled label. Prakash further added that as the songs attained significant virality, the same label which rejected the music rights, had offered more than five times the quoted price. However, Prakash rejected the offer and secured the rights himself as they felt the labels had completely underrated the film as well as the album's potential.

== Release ==
The album was preceded with the first single "Mutta Kalakki" which released on 7 February 2026. It was followed by the second single "Paranthene Penne" on 19 February, an unplugged version of "Mutta Kalakki" as the third single on 25 February, and the fourth single "Aasa Pulla" on 28 February. The fifth single "Loveah Sollitalea" released on 13 March, followed by the sixth single "Jilpanso" on 18 March. The complete album was released on 25 March, six days after the film's release.

== Reception ==
The Hindu's Bhuvanesh Chandar stated "GV Prakash Kumar, whose promo videos with Ken have gone viral, shoulders the film with his scores, and the songs add some more colour to this cheery school life." Avinash Ramachandran of The New Indian Express wrote "While GV Prakash Kumar's score and songs were on point and did exactly what was required, the film did have one song too many. It felt like an easy way out rather than allowing the scenes to explore the emotions of the various characters." Janani K. of India Today wrote "GV Prakash's songs and background score do what they need to — lifting the emotional moments without overpowering them." Abhinav Subramanian of The Times of India, however, felt that "G.V. Prakash's score sounds like it was assembled from his own back catalogue". The song "Mutta Kalakki" went viral upon its release thereby becoming the most viewed Indian film song in YouTube as of July 2026.

== Track listing ==
Youth (Tamil)
No.	Title	Lyrics	Singer(s)	Length
1.	"Jilpanso"	Ken Karunas, Eshwar Santhanalakshmi	Gana Bala, Ken Karunas, Eshwar Santhanalakshmi	2:36
2.	"Aasa Pulla"	Ken Karunas, Eshwar Santhanalakshmi	G. V. Prakash Kumar	2:31
3.	"Loveah Sollitalea"	Ken Karunas, Eshwar Santhanalakshmi	G. V. Prakash Kumar, Ken Karunas	3:01
4.	"Alapuzha Sandhayila"	Ken Karunas, Karunas, Sibiraj Chakravarthi, Eshwar Santhanalakshmi	Grace Karunas, Karunas	2:02
5.	"Mutta Kalakki"	Ken Karunas	Ken Karunas	2:46
6.	"Paranthene Penne"	Vignesh Srikanth	Ken Karunas, Sony Daffodil	2:51
7.	"Ponmaaney"	Vignesh Srikanth	Aavani Malhar	3:25
8.	"Thanga Magan"	Vignesh Srikanth	Haricharan, Sruthy Sivadas	0:59
9.	"Poga Poga"	Eshwar Santhanalakshmi	Vineeth Sreenivasan	3:32
Total length:				23:47

Youth (Telugu)
No.	Title	Lyrics	Singer(s)	Length
1.	"Teenage Song"	Swaroop Goli	Nazeeruddin	2:36
2.	"Na Nacchina Pillave"	Kittu Vissapragada	Eshwar Santhanalakshmi	2:33
3.	"Love You Cheppesane"	Sanare	Eshwar Santhanalakshmi, Venkatramanan	3:01
4.	"Bujji Kutti"	Sanare	Suresh Bobbili, MC Hari	2:02
5.	"Chamiki"	Bhaskarabhatla	Ken Karunas	2:51
6.	"Sakhiye"	Kittu Vissapragada	Sinjith Yerramilli, Sindhuja Tanuku	2:52
7.	"Kalale"	Kittu Vissapragada	Vaishnavi MJS	3:25
8.	"Choodayyo"	Booduri Sudharshan	Vivek Sagar, Vaishnavi MJS	0:59
9.	"Neetho"	Sanare	Jay Krish	3:32
Total length:				23:55

== Additional music ==
In addition to the Tamil original soundtrack, the song "Punnagai Neram Othuku", composed by Deva for the 2000 film Appu, the song "Manmadhane Nee", composed by Yuvan Shankar Raja for the 2004 film Manmadhan, the song "Pottu Thakku", composed by Srikanth Deva for the 2004 film Kuthu and the 2015 Indie song "Naan Aasa Patta Ponnu Peru Monisha", composed by A. C. Dhinakaran are reused in the Tamil version of the film. The original singer Dinesh accused the producers for the unauthorised use of the song, though the team claimed they had secured all the rights and went through several legal producers on obtaining the song for the film.

In addition to the Telugu original soundtrack, the song "Gaajuvaka Pilla", composed by R. P. Patnaik for the 2001 film Nuvvu Nenu, the song "Manmadhuda Nee", composed by Yuvan Shankar Raja for the 2004 film Manmadha and the song "Calcutta Pan Vesina", composed by Mani Sharma for the 2003 film Raghavendra, are reused in the Telugu version of the film.

== Personnel ==
Credits adapted from G. V. Prakash Kumar

- Music composer and producer – G V Prakash Kumar
- Programming – Anand Kashinath, Bobo Shashi, Dan Kristen
- Studios – Divine Labs, Chennai; 2BarQ Studios, Chennai; Sounds Right Studios, Chennai; Contrabass Studios, Chennai; Kashy Records, Chennai; Atrium Sound Studios, Chennai; Sonic Island Studios, Kochi
- Recording engineers – Roopash Tiwari, Amal Mithu, Vishnu Raj, Augustine Premkumar, Vignesh, Hariharan Arulmurugan, Manu Prasad, Anand Kashinath, Alfred Matheesh, Arjun
- Pre-mixing engineer – Roopash Tiwari
- Mixing and mastering engineers – Aswin George John, Jehovahson Alghar
- Musician's assistant – P. Rajamurugan

Instruments

- Guitar – Simeon Telfer, Varun
- Rhythm – Kalyan, Vasanth Matthew
- Percussion – Iniyan
- Flute – R S Vikram
- Trumpet – Rakesh
- Strings – Dan Kristen
- Sarod – Kishore
- Bass – Naveen Napier
- Nadaswaram – Balasubramani, Vengal T. Guhan
- Backing vocals – Anand Kashinath, Ken Karunas, Eshwar Santhanalakshmi, Joshuva
- Kid's choir – Sargam Choir
- Choir performers – Ritik Raghav Prasad, Netik Lava, Aarabhi Ramakrishnan, Bhargavi Ramakrishnan
