= Niranjan Shetty =

Indian film actor (born 1987)

- Born: 24 April 1987 (age 39); Gulvadi Village, Kundapura, Karnataka, India
- Occupation: Actor
- Years active: 1999–present
- Known for: Jolly Days

Niranjan Shetty (born 24 April 1987) is an Indian actor who predominantly works in Kannada cinema. He is known for his acting in movies including Jolly Days and Case No. 18/9.

== Early life ==
Niranjan Shetty was born to Bhaskar Shetty and Sukalatha Shetty in Gulvadi Village of Kundapura, Karnataka. Niranjan finished his schooling in his Native Cherkadi, Udupi and completed his bachelor's degree and Masters in Fine Arts Bangalore.

== Personal life ==
On 19 December 2011 Niranjan married to Nagaveni Shetty. They have a daughter.

== Career ==
Niranjan Shetty started his acting career through Kannada Serials. He has worked in Naagarika', 'Gupta Gamini', 'Papa Pandu', 'Prema Pishachigalu, and other serials.

Later Niranjan started working as an assistant with V. Manohar by which he could make his entry to Kannada cinema from Soap operas. He began as a supporting artist in his cinema journey. In the year 1999 Niranjan played a role of supporting artist in actor Sudeep's ever hit movie Sparsha. Subsequently, he played the part of supporting artist in major hit films like Thuntata, Rishi, Aakash, Namma Basava, Milana etc.

In the year 2009 Nirajan Shetty Made his debut as a lead in the Kannada movie Jolly Days, which became a breakthrough for him as a lead role. He acted as a lead in the movie Case No. 18/9 directed by Mahesh Rao. These two movies gave Niranjan a great breakthrough in his acting career.

== Filmography ==
Year	Film	Role	Notes
1999	Sparsha	Cameraman	
2001	Chitra		
2001	Yuvaraja		
2002	Thuntata		
2005	Rishi		
2005	Aakash	Unemployed man	
2005	Namma Basava		
2007	Milana	Ravi	
2009	Jolly Days	Niranjan "Tyson"	
2012	Case No. 18/9	Mahadeva	
2015	Paipoti		
2017	Rajaru		
2018	Jagath Kiladi		

== Awards and nominations ==
Nominated for the role of Best Male Debutant at 3rd SIIMA Awards for Case No. 18/9
