= Kabir Duhan Singh =

Indian actor (born 1986)

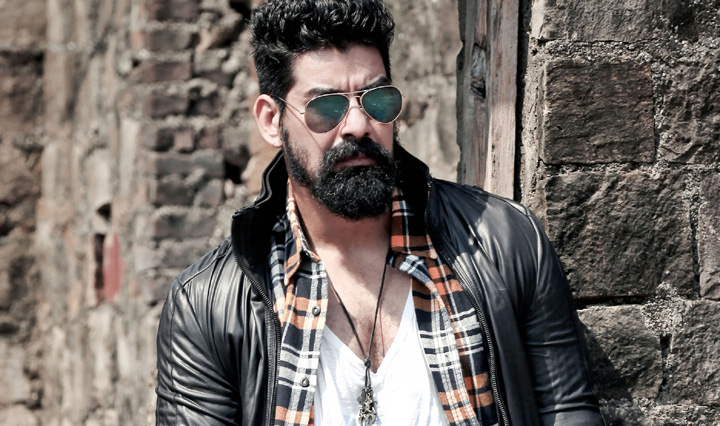
- Singh in 2016
- Born: Kabir Duhan Singh; 8 September 1986 (age 40); Faridabad, Haryana, India
- Occupations: Actor; model
- Years active: 2014–present
- Spouse: Seema Chahal

Kabir Duhan Singh (born 8 September 1986) is an Indian actor, who appears in Telugu, Kannada, Tamil and Malayalam films. He made his debut in the Telugu film Jil (2015). Singh has carved out a career as an antagonist in the film industry. Some of his notable appearances as an antagonist are in Vedalam (2015), Sardaar Gabbar Singh (2016) and 2024 films Turbo and Marco.

== Personal life ==
Kabir Duhan Singh was born in Gohana and brought up in Faridabad in Haryana. Singh married Seema Chahal in 2023. The wedding took place in Haryana.

== Career ==
Singh moved to Mumbai in 2011 and took up modelling as a career. He took up many a Fashion Week assignments and participated in international work as a part of his occupation. His first foray into acting was a part of a Hindi film project starring Shiney Ahuja, but the film was subsequently shelved. Eager to make a career in films, he became a stage actor and then successfully auditioned to be a part of the Telugu film Jil (2015), whose makers had been looking for an antagonist with a North Indian background. The film subsequently won him positive reviews, while his follow up in Kick 2 (2015) was equally appreciated. In order to maintain the high quality of his acting roles, Kabir chose to carefully analyse his characters before committing to roles and turned down other ventures which would have seen him portray the protagonist as well as a role in Bengal Tiger (2015). The actor then made his debut in Tamil films by portraying a villain in Siva's revenge drama Vedalam (2015), which had Ajith Kumar in the lead role.

Following the success of his initial films, Singh began working on several Telugu films at the same time including Dictator and Sardaar Gabbar Singh, both released in 2016, and was reported to be the "busiest baddie in Southern filmdom".

His antagonist character Cyrus Isaac in the 2024 Malayalam film Marco was well received by the audience.

== Filmography ==
Key
†	Denotes films that have not yet been released

=== Films ===
Year	Title	Role	Language	Notes
2015	Jil	Chota Nayak	Telugu	
2015	Kick 2	Munna Thakur	Telugu	
2015	Vedalam	Abhinay	Tamil	
2016	Dictator	Pandu Bhai	Telugu	
2016	Speedunnodu	Jagan	Telugu	
2016	Garam	Biju	Telugu	
2016	Tuntari	Killer Raju	Telugu	
2016	Sardaar Gabbar Singh	Dhanu	Telugu	
2016	Supreme	Vikram Sarkar	Telugu	Nominated – SIIMA Award for Best Actor in a Negative Role (Telugu)
2016	Jakkanna	Bairagi	Telugu	
2016	Rekka	Chezhiyan	Tamil	
2017	Patel S. I. R.	Devraj D.R.	Telugu	
2017	Angel	Garuda	Telugu	
2017	Hebbuli	Kabir	Kannada	
2017	Athiratha	Sarka	Kannada	
2018	Saakshyam	Viswa's business rival	Telugu	
2019	Udgharsha	Dharmendra	Kannada	
2019	Pailwaan	Tony	Kannada	
2019	Kanchana 3	Bhavani	Tamil	
2019	Aruvam	Vikram Jeyaraj	Tamil	
2019	Action	Syed Ibrahim Malik and Syed Muhammad Malik	Tamil	Dual role
2020	Khaali Peeli	Goon	Hindi	
2021	Neuron		Kannada	
2022	Tees Maar Khan	Talwar	Telugu	
2022	Saakini Daakini	Kabir	Telugu	
2022	Therkathi Veeran	Dhruvudas	Tamil	
2023	Hunt	Vikram Singh	Telugu	
2023	Shaakuntalam	Asura King Ugranemi	Telugu	
2023	Phakaat	Hafiz Bhai	Marathi	
2024	Turbo	Vincent	Malayalam	
2024	Danka Hari Namacha	Dan Armani	Marathi	
2024	Simbaa	Parthasarathi Reddy	Telugu	
2024	ARM	Pulimutt Mammadh	Malayalam	
2024	Marco	Cyrus Isaac	Malayalam	
2025	Gajarama		Kannada	
2025	Dakuaan Da Munda 3	DySP Vikram Chaudhary IPS	Punjabi	
2025	Hari Hara Veera Mallu	Gulfam Khan	Telugu	
2025	Padaiyaanda Maaveeraa	Businessman	Tamil	
2025	Mahasenha	Shiva	Tamil	
2025	Akhanda 2: Thaandavam	Ajit Thakur	Telugu	
2026	Anali		Tamil	
2026	Mission C1000	Pandit	Telugu	
2026	Jetlee	Jackie	Telugu	
2026	Kattalan	Eddy and Joseph	Malayalam	Dual role
2026	Love Lottery	Inspector Vikram Bisht	Hindi	

=== Television ===
Year	Title	Role	Language	Network	Ref.
2021	Ramyug	Ravana	Hindi	MX Player	
2026	Kasaragod Embassy	Dammanna	Malayalam	ZEE5	
2026	Dhindora (Season 2)	Vishdhar	Hindi	Netflix	
