= Graamaayana =

2026 Indian Kannada-Language film

- Directed by: Devanuru Chandru
- Written by: Devanuru Chandru
- Produced by: Lahari Velu; G. Ramesh; G. Anand; Naveen Manoharan; Chandru Manoharan
- Starring: Vinay Rajkumar; Megha Shetty; Yogesh
- Cinematography: Santosh Rai Pathaje
- Edited by: Deepu S. Kumar
- Music by: Poornachandra Tejaswi
- Production companies: Veenus Entertainment; Lahari Films
- Distributed by: Lahari Films; Chandan Films
- Release date: 3 July 2026
- Running time: 126 minutes
- Country: India
- Language: Kannada

Graamaayana is a 2026 Indian Kannada-language action drama film written and directed by Devanuru Chandru and produced by Lahari Films in association with Veenus Entertainments. The film stars Vinay Rajkumar, Megha Shetty and Yogesh in the lead roles, with Gopalkrishna Deshpande, Achyuth Kumar, Arun Sagar and Aparna Vastarey appearing in supporting roles. The film features music composed by Poornachandra Tejaswi, cinematography by Santosh Rai Pathaje, and editing by Deepu S. Kumar..

The project was originally launched in 2018 but experienced an extended production halt after the initial phase of filming. It was subsequently revived with a new production team in 2023 and was released theatrically on 3 July 2026. Upon release, Graamaayana received mixed reviews from critics, highlighting the performances, music and visual presentation, while also noting concerns regarding pacing and the handling of its ensemble narrative.

== Synopsis ==
Set in rural Karnataka during the mid-2000s, Graamaayana follows Seena, a young villager known for his sharp instincts, as he navigates the challenges of everyday life, family responsibilities and changing social realities. His life becomes intertwined with that of Kusuma, a college student who balances her education with agricultural work, and the two develop a relationship amid the complexities of village life.

As the story unfolds, the narrative expands beyond their personal journey to examine the social, economic and political dynamics of the village. Local disputes, land-related issues, community relationships and grassroots politics influence the lives of the residents, bringing Seena into situations that test his values and aspirations. Combining elements of drama, romance and action, Graamaayana explores themes of friendship, family, rural livelihoods and civic participation, while depicting the interaction between tradition and social change in a contemporary village setting.

== Cast ==
- Vinay Rajkumar as "Sixth-Sense" Seena
- Megha Shetty as Kusuma
- Yogesh as Kari Bekku
- Gopalkrishna Deshpande as Sadananda Swamy
- Achyuth Kumar
- Aparna Vastarey
- Arun Sagar
- Bala Rajwadi
- Jahangeer
- Seetha Kote
- Ashok Jambe
- Sardar Sathya
- Prashanth Honali
- Bharath
- Manu

== Music ==
The soundtrack and background score is composed by Poornachandra Tejaswi in his first association with Devanuru Chandru. The audio is released and marketed by Lahari Music.

Track listing
No.	Title	Lyrics	Singer(s)	Length
1.	"Benki"	Chi. Udayashankar	Kapil Kapilan, Airaa Udupi	4:32
2.	"Thadka Thadka"	Thrilok Thrivikrama	Anthony Daasan	4:20
3.	"Shatha Shathamaanagalinda"	Poornachandra Tejaswi	Raghu Dixit	4:40
4.	"Yene Helu Kusuma"	Pramod Maravanthe	Nihal Tauro, Sakshi Kallur	5:41
5.	"Soul of Graamaayana"	Savera Swamy	Poornachandra Tejaswi, Arun M. C.	5:41

== Reception ==
Graamaayana received mixed-to-positive reviews from major publications, with critics generally praising its performances, rural setting, music and thematic ambitions, while expressing reservations about its pacing and narrative structure.

The Hindu described the film as being "powered by intense moments" and highlighted its engagement with issues such as caste discrimination, rural livelihoods and the tension between migration to cities and remaining rooted in village life. The review commended the performances of Vinay Rajkumar, Megha Shetty and Gopalkrishna Deshpande, as well as Poornachandra Tejaswi's musical score, while noting that the film occasionally struggles with tonal shifts between drama, romance and social commentary. The New Indian Express (Cinema Express) viewed Graamaayana as a rural drama that combines romance, politics and social issues through the lens of village life. The review noted that the film neither idealises nor condemns rural society, instead portraying how power operates through local institutions, land disputes, personal relationships and community dynamics. It also praised the performances of the principal cast and the film's attempt to connect personal stories with broader political and social realities, while observing that its multiple narrative threads and large ensemble occasionally make the storytelling feel expansive and uneven.

The Times of India, in its coverage of the film, described Graamaayana as a drama centred on village life and the experiences of its protagonist Seena within a rural setting. Meanwhile, India Today characterized the film as a sincere exploration of romance, village conflicts and political exploitation in rural Karnataka. The publication praised the performances and technical aspects of the production but felt that inconsistent writing prevented the narrative from delivering a stronger overall impact.Bangalore Mirror similarly appreciated the film's multi-layered narrative, performances, soundtrack and visuals, while pointing to pacing issues and challenges in balancing its numerous characters and subplots. Across reviews, a common theme was that Graamaayana succeeds in presenting an expansive portrait of rural life and grassroots politics, though critics differed on how effectively it manages its ambitious scope and ensemble-driven storytelling.
