= Tuntari =

2016 Telugu comedy film

- Directed by: Kumar Nagendra
- Screenplay by: Kumar Nagendra
- Story by: AR Murugadoss
- Based on: Maan Karate (2014)
- Produced by: Ashok; Nagarjuna
- Starring: Nara Rohit; Latha Hegde
- Cinematography: M. R. Palani Kumar
- Edited by: Madhu
- Music by: Sai Karthik
- Production company: Sri Keerthi Films
- Release date: March 11, 2016
- Country: India
- Language: Telugu

Tuntari is a 2016 Indian Telugu-language sports comedy film directed by Kumar Nagendra and produced by Ashok and Nagarjun on Sri Keerthi Films. Starring Nara Rohit and Latha Hegde are playing the lead roles. The film is a remake of the Tamil film Maan Karate and was released to mixed reviews.

== Plot ==
When a group of five IT professionals decide to go trekking to a nearby forest area, they come across a sage. They chase down the sage, and to test if he holds real supernatural powers, one of them asks him to produce a newspaper, which is printed on the day after Dusshera, as he knows that all publications are closed on Dusshera and that there would be no newspaper the next day. The sage produces this edition, and goes off into the forest. When they open the newspaper, they find out that the company that they are working for, which got shut four months ago, is soon to start operations. And they also find out from the paper that a particular Raju, whose father is a BSNL employee, would go on to win a boxing championship, and give the prize money of Rs. 5 crores to these five IT professionals. Elated with this, they start searching for Raju and finally nab him in Vizag. On the other hand, Raju is a carefree guy who is jobless and spends his life without any aim. The rest of the story is as to how this group convince Raju to learn boxing and win the prestigious competition.

== Cast ==
- Nara Rohit as Raju
- Latha Hegde as Siri
- Kabir Duhan Singh as Killer Raju
- Pujita Ponnada as Poojitha
- Vennela Kishore as Raju
- Sanjay Reddy as Killer Raju's father-in-law
- Shakalaka Shankar
- Raghu Karumanchi
- Sanjay Swaroop
- Sudharshan as Raju's friend
- Ali in a cameo appearance

== Soundtrack ==
The soundtrack was composed by Sai Karthik and released by Aditya Music.

Track listing
| No. | Title | Lyrics | Singer(s) | Length |
|---|---|---|---|---|
| 1. | "Diamond Girl" | Krishna Chaitanya | Yazin Nizar | 5:09 |
| 2. | "Rajuke Raju" | Kasarla Shyam | Simha | 4:29 |
| 3. | "Ding Dong Darling" | Baruri Subbaraya Sharma | M. L. R. Karthikeyan, Divija Karthik | 3:36 |
| 4. | "Adagaledani" | Balaji | Sai Charan, Deepthi Parthasarathy | 4:04 |
| 5. | "Konaseema" | Balaji | Tippu, Geetha Madhuri | 3:31 |
| Total length: | | | | 20:51 |

== Reception ==
Sangeetha Devi Dundoo of The Hindu wrote, "Tuntari could have been an engaging underdog story or a story of predictions coming true and the challenges in its path. But it’s a potpourri that’s entertaining in parts".
