= Cheluvina Chilipili =

- Official poster
- Directed by: S. Narayan
- Written by: S. Narayan
- Based on: Kotha Bangaru Lokam (Telugu)(2008)
- Produced by: S. Narayan
- Starring: Pankaj; Roopika
- Cinematography: Jagdish Wali
- Music by: Mickey J. Meyer
- Release date: 28 August 2009
- Country: India
- Language: Kannada

Cheluvina Chilipili is a 2009 Indian Kannada-language romantic drama film directed by S. Narayan. A remake of the Telugu film Kotha Bangaru Lokam, the film stars his son Pankaj and newcomer Roopika. The film released to mixed reviews. The film bears a similar to title to S. Narayan's film Cheluvina Chittara.

== Cast ==
- Pankaj as Balu
- Roopika as Swapna
- Rajendra Karanth as Swapna's father
- Anant Nag
- Sumalatha
- Dwarakish
- Sundar

== Production ==
S. Narayan cast his son (in his second film) and newcomer Roopika in the lead roles.

== Music ==
Mickey J Meyer, who composed the music for the original, reused his tunes. The audio launch of the film was attended by Ambareesh and Sumalatha.

Cheluvina Chilipili

Soundtrack album by Mickey J. Meyer
- Released: 2009
- Recorded: 2009
- Genre: Feature film soundtrack
- Length: 25:08
- Language: Kannada

Mickey J. Meyer chronology
Jolly Days (2008)	Cheluvina Chilipili (2009)	Ganesh (2010)

Official audio
- Cheluvina Chilipili - Full Album on YouTube

Track listing
No.	Title	Singer(s)	Length
1.	"Nijaana Naanena"	Sonu Nigam	5:29
2.	"Sai Sai Chakora"	Chethan Sosca, Shreya Ghoshal	3:31
3.	"Kala Degula"	Chethan Sosca	4:15
4.	"Yaavudu Enadu"	Shreya Ghoshal	4:47
5.	"Ninna Prashnege"	Shankar Mahadevan	4:29
6.	"Ninna Prashnege"	Kailash Kher	4:29
Total length:			25:08

== Release and reception ==
The film was released on 28 August 2009. The film released at the same time as the film Iniya.

A critic from Bangalore Mirror criticised Pankaj's acting and opined that "S Narayan has to extract acting from his son the same way he does with other actors" On the contrary, a critic from The Times of India gave the film a rating of three out of five stars and said that "Pankaj excels in romantic, dramatic and action scenes. Roopika is simply superb. Anant Nag and Sumalata do a commendable job. Mickey Meyer's music is good. Jagadish Wali has done a good job with the camera". A critic from The New Indian Express gave the same review and said that "Cheluvina Chilipili is a good family oriented film with message for college students". R. G. Vijayasarathy of Rediff.com gave the film a rating of two out of five stars and opined that "All in all, Cheluvina Chilipili is an enjoyable film".
