= Kanave Kalayadhe =

- DVD cover
- Directed by: V. Gowthaman
- Written by: V. Gowthaman
- Produced by: Sivasakthi Pandian
- Starring: Murali; Simran
- Cinematography: Thangar Bachan
- Edited by: B. Lenin; V. T. Vijayan
- Music by: Deva
- Production company: Sivasakthi Movie Makers
- Release date: 6 August 1999
- Running time: 160 minutes
- Country: India
- Language: Tamil

Kanave Kalayadhe (transl. Oh Dream, Do Not Fade) is a 1999 Indian Tamil-language romantic drama film directed by V. Gowthaman in his debut. The film stars Murali and Simran in the lead roles, with the latter playing a dual role. The score and soundtrack were composed by Deva. It was produced by Sivasakthi Movie Makers. The film was released on 6 August 1999.

== Plot ==
Anand and Amritha are lovers living in Chandigarh. While Amritha is a Punjabi, Anand is a Tamilan. To seek the approval of Amritha's parents for their marriage, Anand goes to Amritha's home in Punjab. However, before they can unite, Amritha and her family die in a bomb blast. Unable to bear the separation, Anand goes into depression. His friends take him to Chennai, Tamil Nadu with the hope that he will start life afresh. There, life throws a googly at him when he sees Saradha, Amritha's lookalike. After the initial hiccups, Anand and Saradha decide to get married. But at this point, Anand learns that Shekhar, Sharada's old lover, is still waiting for her. The film ends with Anand uniting Shekar and Saradha.

== Cast ==
- Murali as Anand
- Simran as Amritha (Punjabi) and Saradha (Tamilian), dual roles
- Delhi Ganesh as Saradha's father
- Chinni Jayanth as Pavadarayan
- Charle as Paneer
- Dhamu as Selvam
- Shakti Kumar as Shekhar
- Rajeev as Manager
- Kovai Sarala as Kayal Vizhi
- Ponnambalam as Fighter
- Sabitha Anand as Manager's wife
- Yograj Singh as Sardhaji
- Ramji as Anand's friend

== Production ==
Kanave Kalayadhe is the directorial debut of Gowthaman. The film was shot in locations including the Golden Temple in Amritsar, Jallianwala Bagh, the Rock Garden of Chandigarh, the Wagah border and Ananthpur Sahib. Shooting coincided with the celebrations of the 300th anniversary of the founding of the Khalsa Panth.

== Soundtrack ==
The songs in Kanave Kalayadhe are composed by Deva.

| Song | Singers | Lyrics | Length |
|---|---|---|---|
| "Kannil Unnai" | K. S. Chitra | Vaali | 05:58 |
| "Dilli Thaandi" | Mano | Vairamuthu | 05:17 |
| "Kannodu Kannodu" | P. Unni Krishnan, Mahanadi Shobana | Vairamuthu | 05:28 |
| "Poosu Manjal" | Hariharan | Vairamuthu | 05:38 |
| "Poosu Manjal" | Anuradha Paudwal | Vairamuthu | 05:41 |
| "Vaanguda 420 Beeda" | Sabesh, Deva | Ponniyin Selvan | 05:27 |

== Reception ==
D. S. Ramanujam of The Hindu wrote, "[Kanave Kalayadhe] is replete with emotional twists handled with taste and refinement by debutant director V. Gouthaman. The lead pair, Murali and Simran lend enough depth in their portrayals. The good pace the director works out in the first half through his screenplay". K. P. S. of Kalki called it an old fashioned love story but praised the acting of Murali and Simran, Deva's music and Thangar Bachan's cinematography.
