= Idli Kadai (soundtrack) =

- Soundtrack album cover

Soundtrack album by G. V. Prakash Kumar
- Released: 25 September 2025
- Recorded: 2024–2025
- Studios: Divine Labs, Chennai; Sounds Right Studios, Chennai; AM Studios, Chennai; Audiogene Sound Studios, Kochi; Contrabass Music Studios, Chennai; Sonic Island, Kochi; CAC Studios, Kochi; Deepak SR Productions, Kochi; Mystic Hues, Chennai
- Genre: Feature film soundtrack
- Length: 22:01
- Language: Tamil
- Label: Saregama
- Producer: G. V. Prakash Kumar

G. V. Prakash Kumar chronology
Padaiyaanda Maaveeraa (2025)	Idli Kadai (2025)	Mask (2025)

Singles from Idli Kadai
- 1. "Enna Sugam" Released: 27 July 2025; 2. "Enjaami Thandhaane" Released: 27 August 2025; 3. "Yen Paattan Saami Varum" Released: 17 September 2025

Idli Kadai is the soundtrack album to the 2025 Tamil-language drama film of the same name written, directed and co-produced by Dhanush, who also leads an ensemble cast that includes Arun Vijay, Sathyaraj, P. Samuthirakani, Nithya Menen, Shalini Pandey, Rajkiran and R. Parthiban. The soundtrack features six songs composed by G. V. Prakash Kumar and lyrics written by Dhanush, Raju Murugan, Arivu and Falcon. Led by three singles, the album was released under the Saregama label on 25 September 2025.

== Background ==
The film's music is composed by G. V. Prakash Kumar, in his ninth collaboration with Dhanush. (Note: Prakash had composed for Dhanush's films an actor, including Polladhavan (2007), Aadukalam (2011), Mayakkam Enna (2011), Asuran (2019), Maaran (2022), Vaathi (2023), Captain Miller (2024) and with Dhanush as a director for Nilavuku En Mel Ennadi Kobam (2025).) He composed few songs in the village native folk genre and mostly in the rural base. He also mixed folk music with spiritual elements, especially in the song "Yen Paattan Saami Varum" and "Ethana Saami". Five of the songs filled with earthy rural elements, except for one song "My Heartu Spinning" which is a pop number centered on Dhanush and Pandey. At the film's audio launch, Prakash admitted that he did not want to compose music for virality but bring an ambience that suited the film's storyline and also driving the narrative. The film's audio rights were acquired by Saregama.

== Release ==
The audio launch took place on 14 September at the Jawaharlal Nehru Indoor Stadium in Chennai with the cast and crew in attendance. However, the album was not released on that date. Instead, the complete album consisting of six tracks was released on 25 September. The album for the Telugu version, Idli Kottu, released five days later.

=== Singles ===
The first single, "Enna Sugam" was released on 27 July 2025, coinciding the eve of Dhanush's birthday. The second single, "Enjaami Thandhaane", was released on 27 August, Ganesh Chaturthi. The third single, "Yen Paattan Saami Varum", was released on 17 September.

== Track listing ==
Idli Kadai (Tamil)
No.	Title	Lyrics	Singer(s)	Length
1.	"Enna Sugam"	Dhanush	Dhanush, Shweta Mohan	3:42
2.	"Enjaami Thandhaane"	Dhanush	Dhanush, Arivu	4:52
3.	"Yen Paattan Saami Varum"	Dhanush	Anthony Daasan	3:42
4.	"Ethana Saami"	Raju Murugan	Pushpavanam Kuppusamy	4:38
5.	"Kulasamy Kaaval Kaaka"	Arivu	Arivu	2:33
6.	"My Heartu Spinning"	Falcon	A. R. Ameen, Sublahshini	2:32
Total length:				22:01

All lyrics are written by Samrat Naidu.

Idli Kottu (Telugu)
No.	Title	Singer(s)	Length
1.	"Kotthagundhe"	Krishna Tejasvi, Shweta Mohan	3:42
2.	"Ennaallakochhade"	Anand Sreeraj, Hemachandra	4:52
3.	"Maayeea Dhevenalu"	Krishna Tejasvi	3:42
4.	"Endharo Cheppinna"	Krishna Tejasvi	4:38
5.	"Kuladheivam Thode Needhi"	Sudheesh Saikumar	2:33
6.	"My Heartu Spinning"	S. P. Abhishek, Sublahshini	2:32
Total length:			22:01

== Reception ==
Arjun Menon of The Indian Express wrote "G V Prakash Kumar uses a largely ambient soundtrack that embeds itself in the delicate film with little to no fuss." Avinash Ramachandran of Cinema Express wrote "While the songs in Idli Kadai stayed true to its territory and complemented the look and feel of the film, which felt straight out of 80s Tamil cinema, GV Prakash's background score was coercive to a fault." Janani K. of India Today wrote "GV Prakash's music has a heavy Thiruchitrambalam hangover, especially in the background score." Jagadish Angadi of Deccan Herald wrote "G V Prakash Kumar's music complements the narrative". Bhuvanesh Chandar of The Hindu called it a "stirring music".

== Personnel ==
Credits adapted from Saregama Tamil:

- Music composer and producer: G. V. Prakash Kumar
- Music programming: Ganesan S, Harsha Ben, Aswin Sathya, Sachin Basrur, Dan Kristen, Smith Asher
- Flute: Lalit Talluri
- Bass: Sandeep Mohan
- Bass guitar: Reshwin Nishith
- Tabla: Nithin Vincent
- Nadaswaram: Mambalam Sivakumar, OK Gopi
- Sitar: Paulson KJ
- Kanjira and Indian percussions: Karthik Vamsi
- Live percussions: Kaviraj, Venkat, Karthik Vamsi, Ranjith, Hari Prasad
- Strings: Chennai Strings Orchestra
- String conductor: Balaji
- Rhythm: Kalyan
- Harmonies and electric guitar: Smith Asher
- Male chorus: Bharath Sajikumar, Jasim Jamal, Akhil Dev, Milan Joy, Amal C Ajith, Balram K Mohandas, Soorya Shyam Gopal, Siyad K
- Female chorus: Punnya Pradeep, Aavani Malhar, Sadhika KR, Sruthy Sivadas, Sony Mohan, Swetha Ashok
- Recording studios: Divine Labs (Chennai), Sounds Right Studio (Chennai), AM Studios (Chennai), Audiogene Sound Studios (Kochi), Contrabass Music Studios (Chennai), Sonic Island (Kochi), CAC Studios (Kochi), Deepak SR Productions (Kochi), Mystic Hues (Chennai)
- Recording engineers: Jehovahsan Alghar, Roopash Tiwar, Aswin George John, S. Sivakumar, Amal Raj, Sanjai Arakkal, Vyaskh, Lijesh Kumar, Arjun B Nair, Nikhil Mathews, Deepak SR, Biju James, Abin Ponnachan
- Music supervision, mixing and mastering: Jehovahson Alghar
- Sound engineer and pre-mixing: Roopash Tiwari
- Music assistant: P. Rajamurugan
