= Parasakthi (soundtrack) =

- Soundtrack album cover

Soundtrack album by G. V. Prakash Kumar
- Released: 3 January 2026
- Recorded: 2024–2025
- Studios: Divine Labs, Chennai; Sounds Right Studios, Chennai; Soundtown Studios, Chennai; 2 Bar Q Studios, Chennai; Audiogene Sound Studios, Kochi; Moth Music Records, Mumbai
- Genre: Feature film soundtrack
- Length: 24:48
- Language: Tamil
- Label: Saregama
- Producer: G. V. Prakash Kumar

G. V. Prakash Kumar chronology
| Mask (2025) | Parasakthi (2026) | Youth (2026) |

Singles from Parasakthi
- 1. "Adi Alaye" Released: 6 November 2025; 2. "Ratnamala" Released: 25 November 2025; 3. "Namakkana Kaalam" Released: 14 December 2025

Parasakthi is the soundtrack album composed by G. V. Prakash Kumar to the 2026 Tamil-language historical political action drama film of the same name directed by Sudha Kongara, and produced by Aakash Baskaran of Dawn Pictures starring Ravi Mohan, Sivakarthikeyan, Atharvaa and Sreeleela. It is Prakash's 100th film as a music composer. The album featured six songs written by Yugabharathi, Ekadesi, Arivu, Kaber Vasuki and Jayashree Mathimaran. Preceded by three singles, the soundtrack was released through Saregama record label on 3 January 2026 at an audio launch event in Chennai.

== Background ==
The film's music is composed by G. V. Prakash Kumar in his third collaboration with Kongara after Soorarai Pottru (2020) and its Hindi remake Sarfira (2024), and second with Sivakarthikeyan after Amaran (2024). It is also Prakash's 100th film as a music composer. Prakash was involved in the film, when the project was announced with Suriya during October 2021, which was tentatively tited as Suriya 43. He recorded the songs for the film on 1 January 2024 (New Year's Day) with Dhee being the lead singer.

Despite the cast and production changes, the song was still featured in Parasakthi, later becoming a duet with Sean Roldan ("Adi Alaye"). During mid-November 2025, it was reported that Yuvan Shankar Raja had sung a song for the film, which was later deciphered as "Senai Koottam". Sivakarthikeyan had also recorded a "rebel anthem" for the film, titled "Tharakku Tharakku" with A. R. Ameen. Besides composing, Prakash had also recorded two melodic numbers, "Ratnamala" and a duet number "Muthaarame" with Saindhavi. Speaking to Cinema Express, Kongara noted that Prakash had been "the architect of my creative ambitions" and his contributions "imbues the film with transcendent promise".

== Release ==
The audio rights were acquired by Saregama. The first single "Adi Alaye" was released on 6 November 2025. The second single "Ratnamala" was released on 25 November 2025. The third single "Namakkana Kaalam was released on 14 December 2025. The audio launch was held on 3 January 2026 at the Sai Leo Muthu Indoor Stadium located in Sri Sai Ram Engineering College, Chennai, featuring the cast and crew and other celebrities in attendance. The full album was released in conjunction with the audio launch, while the event was aired via Sun TV the following day.

== Track listing ==
Tamil
| No. | Title | Lyrics | Singer(s) | Length |
|---|---|---|---|---|
| 1. | "Adi Alaye" | Ekadesi | Sean Roldan, Dhee | 4:10 |
| 2. | "Ratnamala" | Jayashree Mathimaran, Ramajogayya Sastry | G. V. Prakash Kumar | 4:39 |
| 3. | "Namakkana Kaalam" | Arivu | Nakash Aziz, Haricharan, Velmurugan | 4:04 |
| 4. | "Muthaarame" | Jayashree Mathimaran | G. V. Prakash Kumar, Saindhavi | 4:17 |
| 5. | "Senai Koottam" | Yugabharathi | Yuvan Shankar Raja | 4:20 |
| 6. | "Tharakku Tharakku" | Kaber Vasuki | Sivakarthikeyan, A. R. Ameen | 3:17 |
| Total length: | | | | 24:48 |

Telugu
| No. | Title | Lyrics | Singer(s) | Length |
|---|---|---|---|---|
| 1. | "Singaaraala Seethaakoka" | Bhaskarabhatla | L. V. Revanth, Dhee, Sean Roldan | 4:10 |
| 2. | "Ratnamala" | Ramajogayya Sastry, Anurag Kashyap | G. V. Prakash Kumar | 4:39 |
| 3. | "Janjara Janjaraja" | Rambabu Gosala | Nakash Aziz | 4:04 |
| 4. | "Thaaraamani" | Ramajogayya Sastry | Krishna Tejasvi, Saindhavi | 4:17 |
| 5. | "Koodey Sainyam" | Rakendu Mouli | Yuvan Shankar Raja | 4:20 |
| 6. | "Saraku Saraku Sara" | Rehman | Nakul Abhyankar, Sarath Santhosh | 3:17 |
| Total length: | | | | 24:48 |

== Reception ==
Janani K. of India Today wrote "GV Prakash's music, especially Senai Kootam and the background score, elevates the protest scenes." Anandu Suresh of The Indian Express wrote "While GV Prakash’s background score during the more mundane and romantic moments is below average, he shines in the adrenaline-fueled sequences, and his songs also deserve commendation." Roopa Radhakrishnan of The Times of India noted that Prakash's background score"provides the goosebumps and amplifies the highs" while also stating that the songs felt "stretched". Srinivasa Ramanujam of The Hindu wrote "Major contributions are also by the music director - GV Prakash, whose tunes delicately balance melody and mass, based on what unfolds on the screen."

== Personnel ==
Credits adapted from Saregama:

- Music composer and producer: G. V. Prakash Kumar
- Programming: Raj Kumar Amal, Smith Asher, Siddhanth Sanjay
- Chorus: Abhijith Rao, Shibi Srinivasan, Jagadeesh Kumar Balraj, Govind Prasad, Gayathri, Sriradha Bharath, Devu Treesa Mathew, Indulekha Sanathkumar
- Vocal supervision: S. P. Abhishek
- Backing vocals: Smith Asher
- Keys: Raj Kumar Amal
- Rhythm: Kalyan, Hubert Maaran
- Ethnic frets: Akash S Menon
- Flute: Lalit Talluri
- Sarangi: Manonmani
- Studios: Divine Labs, Chennai; Sounds Right Studios, Chennai; Soundtown Studios, Chennai; 2 Bar Q Studios, Chennai; Audiogene Sound Studios, Kochi; Moth Music Records, Mumbai
- Recording: Jehovahson Alghar, Roopash Tiwari, Manu Ravichandran, Aswin George John, Vishnu Shankar, Vishnu Raj MR, Manu Prasad, Sanjai Arakkal, Amit Sawant,
- Pre-mixing: Roopash Tiwari
- Mixing and mastering: Jehovahson Alghar, Aswin George John
- Music supervision: Jehovahson Alghar, Roopash Tiwari
- Musicians' assistance: P Rajamurugan
