= Run Antony =

- Official Poster
- Directed by: Raghu Shastri
- Written by: Raghu Shastri
- Screenplay by: Raghu Shastri
- Produced by: Parvathamma Rajkumar; Raghavendra Rajkumar; Guru Rajkumar
- Starring: Vinay Rajkumar; Rukshar Dhillon; Sushmita Joshi
- Cinematography: Manohar Joshi
- Music by: Manikanth Kadri
- Production company: Vajreshwari Combines
- Release date: 8 July 2016
- Country: India
- Language: Kannada

Run Antony is a 2016 Indian Kannada action thriller film written and directed by Raghu Shastri, making his debut. Produced by Parvathamma Rajkumar, Raghavendra Rajkumar and Guru Rajkumar under Vajreshwari Hospitality banner, the film stars Vinay Rajkumar and debutants Sushmita Joshi and Rukshar Dhillon in the lead roles. The film's score and soundtrack is composed by Manikanth Kadri whilst the cinematography is by Manohar Joshi.

The filming has taken place from December 2015 and took a stretch of 60 days to complete. The film released on 8 July 2016.

== Cast ==
- Vinay Rajkumar as Antony D'souza
- Rukhsar Dhillon as Yashu/Yashwini
- Sushmita Joshi as Kannika
- Devaraj as Nazeem Khan (Intelligence Officer)
- K. S. Sridhar
- Sai Kumar as Intelligence Journalist (Guest Appearance)
- H. G. Dattatreya
- Bullet Prakash
- Shailaja Joshi

== Production ==
=== Development ===
Raghu Shastri, a former assistant to Bollywood director Anurag Kashyap was approached by Raghavendra Rajkumar to direct the script which he had made ready. Actor Vinay found the script interesting and agreed to star in the film choosing this as his second venture after the success of his first film Siddhartha (2015). The script is said to have a blend of both romance and thriller concepts. Early reports suggested the film would launch in November 2015 which eventually got postponed to December 2015.

=== Casting ===
Soon after selecting Raghu Shastry to direct the film, producer Raghavendra Rajkumar along with his actor son Vinay Rajkumar went on to search for the two female leads by browsing through around 500 photographs. They finalized Rukhsar Mir and Sushmita Joshi to play the roles. While Rukhsar hails from Darjeeling and doing her studies in Bangalore, Sushmita also is from Northern India. Veteran actor Devaraj was roped in to play an important supporting role.

== Soundtrack ==
Manikanth Kadri has composed the score and original soundtrack for the film. Actor Puneeth Rajkumar has recorded a song for the film.

=== Track listing ===
No.	Title	Lyrics	Singer(s)	Length
1.	"Jhanak Jhanak"	V. Nagendra Prasad	Puneeth Rajkumar	03:39
2.	"Kanna Kareyu"	Raghu Shastri	Soham Chakraborty, Yazin Nizar	05:10
3.	"Marula"	Jayant Kaikini	Soham Chakraborty, Supriya Lohith	04:46
4.	"Run Antony Yuva Mash Up"		Keerthan Holla, Aravind Mukundan	02:56
5.	"Run Run Run"		Divya Kumar, Varijashree Venugopal	03:57
6.	"Summane"	Raghu Shastri	Javed Ali	05:08
Total length:				25:36

== Reception ==
The Hindu said running with Antony was tiresome. The Deccan chronicle rated 2 stars to the movie and reviewed the movie as a frustrating experience
