= Bangaru Babu (2009 film) =

- VCD cover
- Directed by: Jonnalagadda Srinivas
- Written by: Madukuri Raja (dialogues)
- Screenplay by: Dasari Narayana Rao
- Based on: Rishi (2005)
- Produced by: K. Ramakrishna Prasad
- Starring: Jagapati Babu; Meera Jasmine
- Cinematography: Ch. Ramana Raju
- Edited by: B. Krishanam Raju
- Music by: M. M. Srilekha
- Production company: Sowbhagya Media Limited
- Release date: 1 May 2009
- Running time: 154 minutes
- Country: India
- Language: Telugu

Bangaru Babu (transl. Golden boy) is 2009 Indian Telugu-language drama film, produced by K.Ramakrishna Prasad on Swobhagya Media Limited banner with story and screenplay by Dasari Narayana Rao and directed by Jonnalagadda Srinivas. Starring Jagapathi Babu, Meera Jasmine and music composed by M. M. Srilekha. The film was recorded as a flop at the box office. Most of the scenes in the film have been shot extensively in Jammu and Kashmir. The movie was a remake of the Kannada movie Rishi (2005).

== Cast ==
- Jagapathi Babu as Ravindra
- Meera Jasmine as Meera
- Sayaji Shinde as Narsimha Rao
- Sonu Sood as Rajendra, Ravindra's brother
- Murali Mohan as Ravindra's father
- Jayasudha as Ravindra's mother
- Shashank as Hari
- Gowri Munjal
- Jaya Prakash Reddy
- Dharmavarapu Subramanyam as Murthy
- M. S. Narayana as Nagaraju
- L. B. Sriram
- Amith
- Raja Sridhar
- Ping Pong Surya
- Kondavalasa
- Chittajalu Lakshmipati
- Vizag Prasad
- Shankar Melkote
- Malladi Raghava
- Narayana Rao
- Navabharat Balaji
- Gundu Sudarshan
- Ambati Srinivas
- Fish Venkat as Narsimha Rao's henchmen
- Uttej
- Jenny
- Jyothi Lakshmi
- Sudha
- Hema as Ravindra's sister
- Sudeepa Pinky
- Rama Prabha
- Vinaya Prasad
- Jhansi
- Padma Jayanth
- Srilalitha
- Monica Chowdary
- Vishwak Sen

== Soundtrack ==
Bangaru Babu

Film score by M. M. Srilekha
- Released: 2009
- Genre: Soundtrack
- Length: 25:11
- Label: Mayuri Audio
- Producer: M. M. Srilekha

M. M. Srilekha chronology
Aadi Vishnu (2008)	Bangaru Babu (2009)	A Aa E Ee (2009)

Music composed by M. M. Srilekha. Music released on Mayuri Audio Company.

No.	Title	Lyrics	Singer(s)	Length
1.	"Gulabi Puvvu"	Chandrabose	Tippu, MM Srilekha	3:54
2.	"Ningiloni"	Chinnicharan	Hariharan, Nitya Santhoshini	4:34
3.	"Galu Galu Galu"	Chandrabose	Syrona	4:43
4.	"16 Va Eata"	Chinnicharan	Shankar Mahadevan, Chitra	4:00
5.	"Sannani Nadumuki"	Chandrabose	S. P. Balasubrahmanyam, MM Srilekha	4:12
6.	"Devude Navvedure"	Suddala Ashok Teja	Vandemataram Srinivas	3:48
Total length:				25:11
