= Jolly Days =

2009 Kannada film directed by M. D. Sridhar

- VCD cover
- Directed by: M. D. Sridhar
- Written by: B. A. Madhu (Dialogue)
- Story by: Sekhar Kammula
- Produced by: Madireddy Param
- Starring: Pradeep; Aishwarya Nag; Vishwas; Ruthuva; Praveen Tej; Niranjan Shetty
- Cinematography: A. V. Krishna Kumar
- Edited by: P. R. Soundar Raj
- Music by: Mickey J. Meyer
- Release date: 23 January 2009
- Running time: 133 minutes
- Country: India
- Language: Kannada

Jolly Days is an Indian 2009 Kannada-language film directed by M. D. Sridhar and produced by Madireddy Param under Young Dream Productions. The film featured mostly newcomers in lead roles including Pradeep, Aishwarya Nag, Vishwas, Praveen Tej and others. The music was scored by Mickey J. Meyer. It is a remake of the 2007 Telugu movie Happy Days. It was released in India on 23 January 2009 and became a hit.

== Plot ==
The story is about four pairs of engineering students and their activities in college campus and their hostel stories including ragging, teasing, gaming and their love interests.

== Cast ==
- Pradeep as Santhosh "Santhu"
- Aishwarya Nag as "Ankita"
- Vishwas as "Vishwas"
- Spoorthi as Apoorva "Appu"
- Niranjan Shetty as Niranjan "Tyson"
- Ruthuva as Shravanti "Shras"
- Praveen Tej as Praveen
- Keerthigowda as Keerthi
- Suchendra Prasad as College Principal
- Ruthika as English lecturer
- Vijayasarathi as Faculty member
- Kishori Ballal as Ankita's grandmother
- Hanumanthegowda as Vishwas father

== Soundtrack ==
Jolly Days

Soundtrack album by Mickey J. Meyer
- Released: 2009
- Recorded: 2009
- Genre: Soundtrack
- Length: 28:27
- Language: Kannada
- Label: Anand Audio

Mickey J. Meyer chronology
Kotha Bangaru Lokam (2008)	Jolly Days (2009)	Cheluvina Chilipili (2019)

The official soundtrack contains seven songs, tuned by Mickey J. Meyer with all the tunes reprising from his own Telugu Happy Days. All the lyrics were penned by Kaviraj.

Track-List
No.	Title	Lyrics	Singer(s)	Length
1.	"Saluge Saluge"	Kaviraj	Karthik	4:59
2.	"Joy Joy Jolly"	Kaviraj	Krishna Chaitanya, Kranti, Aditya, Siddharth, Sashi Kiran	4:34
3.	"Jolly Days"	Kaviraj	Mickey J. Meyer, Harshika	3:51
4.	"Yakundendu"	Traditional	Pranavi	1:24
5.	"Sarigama sarigama"	Kaviraj	Ranjith, Sunitha Sarathy	4:45
6.	"Raktha sambandhagala"	Kaviraj	Karthik	5:03
7.	"Jolly Days" (Rock Version)	Kaviraj	Suresh Iyer, Mickey J. Meyer	3:51
Total length:				28:27

== Reception ==
A critic from The Times of India wrote that "A campus love story with lively narration and brilliant script that is sure to take you back to your college life". A critic from IANS wrote that "'Jolly Days' is a jolly good film. Watch it and revive your memories of college days". Film critic R. G. Vijayasarathy for Rediff.com wrote that "All in all, Jolly Days is worth watching". A critic from Bangalore Mirror wrote that "Even if you are not a college student you can still relive your student days watching Jolly Days". A critic from New Indian Express wrote that the film "is a mix of emotions one too many - romance, comedy and friendship. It is a mustwatch for college students who have big ambitions in life".
