= Athiratha =

- Directed by: Mahesh Babu
- Written by: T. N. Santhosh
- Based on: Kanithan (2016)
- Produced by: Prem; Dr. Venugopal; Gandasi Manjunath
- Starring: Chethan Kumar; Latha Hegde; Kabir Duhan Singh
- Cinematography: Jai Anand
- Edited by: Muniraj
- Music by: Suraag
- Production company: Chamundi Cine Creations
- Distributed by: Vijay Cinemas
- Release date: 24 November 2017
- Running time: 140 min
- Country: India
- Language: Kannada

Athiratha is a 2017 Indian Kannada action thriller film directed by Mahesh Babu. It stars Chethan Kumar and Latha Hegde, with Kabir Duhan Singh and Sadhu Kokila in supporting roles. The score and soundtrack are by Suraag and the cinematography is by Jai Anand.

The film is a remake of Tamil film Kanithan (2016).

== Plot ==
The film depicts Akash (Chethan) as a TV reporter on Spy TV. He is investigating a minister's scandal in a pub with his friend. He meets a girl named Mary (Latha Hegde), working on the same TV channel as a reporter. His father (Avinash) is a news anchor on the Doordarshan channel. He tells him to quit that job and find other work.

One day, police falsely arrest him together with four other youths, charging them with a money scandal of taking loans with falsified papers. One of the youths dies in a road accident while trying to escape court.

Akash's lawyer friend Ravishankar Gowda releases him on bail. He searches for the truth behind the scandal. Akash collects all duplicate certificates from Sarka's (Kabir Duhan Sigh) mafia places, with the help of his colleagues and gives the evidence to the TV channel.

The news goes viral, and Sarka sees it. He starts to think about who exposed his mafia. Sarka sends his goons to interrogate the TV reporters one by one. They disclose Akash's name. Sarka takes his colleagues hostage. Akash kills two of Sarka's goons, and Sarka kills two of Akash's friends and his uncle (Achyuth Rao).

Akash is determined to reveal the evidence, so he sends his friend to the mafia headquarters to collect more; he stays outside. Akash unsuccessfully tries to telecast the evidence secured to TV networks. Akash and his buddies reach a news office, where Akash sends the crew in while he fights Sarka off.

Sarka recovers and once again tries to take Akash out. He runs into a machine and falls into a coma. Police seize his mafia cohorts and take them into custody. Akash gets a job on a BBC affiliate channel. In the last scene, Sarka is killed by a student doctor.

== Cast ==
- Chethan Kumar as Akash, News Reporter
- Latha Hegde as Adithi, Akash's colleague
- Kabir Duhan Singh as Sarka, Mafia don of money and duplicate certificate scandal
- Sadhu Kokila as A TV Channel owner
- Avinash as Akash's father, News Host in Dooradarshan
- Achyuth Kumar as Avinash's friend, Police Constable
- Ravishankar Gowda as Akash's lawyer friend
- Parkourpaiyan
- Sudha Belawadi as Akash's mother
- Aruna Balraj as the mother of one of the youths accused in the case
- Ester Noronha as item number
- Prashanth Siddi as Ningu, one of the News Reporter in Spy TV

== Soundtrack ==
Athiratha

Soundtrack album by Suraag
- Genre: Feature film soundtrack
- Language: Kannada
- Label: Loop Entertainment
- Producer: Suraag

The film's background score and the soundtracks were composed by debut artist Suraag, son of Sadhu Kokila. The music rights were acquired by Loop Entertainment.

Tracklist
No.	Title	Lyrics	Singer(s)	Length
1.	"Sum Sumne Heege"	Chethan	Kunal Ganjawala, Suzzana	5:07
2.	"Jayaso Yuddhavanu"	V. Nagendra Prasad	Hemanth Kumar	4:21
3.	"Chu Chu"	Ghouse Peer	Vijay Prakash, Alok Katdare	4:11
4.	"Jadugara Jadugara"	Kaviraj	Usha. N	4:17
