= Odahuttidavaru =

- Poster
- Directed by: Dorai–Bhagavan
- Written by: S. K. Bhagavan; Chi. Udaya Shankar
- Produced by: S. P. Varadaraj
- Starring: Rajkumar; Ambareesh; Madhavi; Srishanti
- Cinematography: B. C. Gowrishankar
- Edited by: P. Bhaktavatsalam
- Music by: Upendra Kumar
- Production company: Sri Lakshmi Art Combines
- Release date: 11 February 1994
- Running time: 140 minutes
- Country: India
- Language: Kannada

Odahuttidavaru (transl. Siblings) is a 1994 Indian Kannada-language romantic drama film directed by Dorai–Bhagavan and was jointly written by S. K Bhagavan and Chi. Udaya Shankar. The film stars Rajkumar and Ambareesh in lead roles, along with Madhavi, Srishanti, Vajramuni and K. S. Ashwath in supporting roles. The film revolves around the two farmer brothers who undergo many traumas in their relationships due to external forces and fight them to reunite again. The core concept of the movie was based on Gourish Kaikini's novel Mannina Manushya which was a translation of the Odia novel Matira Manisha (1934) by Kalindi Charan Panigrahi.

The film was produced and distributed by S. P. Varadaraj under the banner of Sri Lakshmi Art Combines. The film marked the final script of Chi. Udaya Shankar and was released after his death on 2 July 1993. It was his final collaboration with director duo Dorai–Bhagavan. The film features original songs composed by Upendra Kumar, with lyrics written unusually using six lyricists, namely M. N. Vyasa Rao, Chi. Udaya Shankar, Sri Ranga, Geethapriya, Hamsalekha and Vijaya Narasimha. The film featured the last song written by the lyricist Vijaya Narasimha.The cinematography of the film was done by B. C. Gowrishankar and the editing was done by P. Bhaktavatsalam.

The film opened to widespread critical acclaim. The film was released with high expectations as it marked the first collaboration of veteran actors Rajkumar and Ambareesh. It was a blockbuster at the box office and emerged as the highest-grossing Kannada film of 1994. The film completed 100 days in 33 first-release theaters. The feat was matched by Appu in 2002 (also 100 days in 33 first-release theaters), and was superseded by Jogi in 2005 which ran for 100 days in 61 first-release theaters. The film overall completed a theatrical run of 25 weeks. Dr. Rajkumar won his ninth and final Karnataka State Film Award for Best Actor for his performance in the film.

== Plot ==
Ramanna lives with his father Venkanna, wife Ganga and an educated younger brother Sridhar in a village. Venkanna has made Ramanna promise him that no matter what, he would not let his family split up. A few years later, Ramanna had two children, and the whole family is living happily. Sridhar falls in love with Rathna, daughter of a rich man named Rudrayya. Unwillingly, Rudrayya lets his daughter marry the man of her choice. However, he poisons her mind to create a rift between the brothers and the whole family. To not let the family divide and to keep his promise made to his father, Ramanna and his family leave the house. Upon finding this out, Sridhar realizes his mistake, and the plots of Rathna's father are revealed. The whole family reconciles and forgives each other's follies.

== Cast ==
- Dr. Rajkumar as Ramanna
- Ambareesh as Sridhar
- Madhavi as Ganga, Ramanna's wife
- Srishanti as Rathna, Sridhar's wife
- T. N. Balakrishna as Puttappa
- K. S. Ashwath as Venkanna, Ramanna and Sridhar's father
- Vajramuni as Rudrayya, Rathna's father
- Sudheer as Devayya
- Umashree as Kamakshi
- Sathyabhama
- Shyamala
- Kala
- Shanthamma
- Master Vinay Raghavendra as Vinu, Ramanna and Ganga's elder son
- Master Guru Raghavendra as Ramanna and Ganga's younger son
- Shani Mahadevappa as Dharma
- Prithviraj
- Honnavalli Krishna

== Production ==
The massive race with 40 bullock carts was filmed at Lalitha Mahal, Mysore.

== Soundtrack ==
Odahuttidavaru

Soundtrack album by Upendra Kumar
- Released: 1994
- Genre: Feature film soundtrack
- Length: 29:05
- Label: Sangeetha

The music of the film was composed by Upendra Kumar, with lyrics of each of the six songs penned by six different lyricists – M. N. Vyasa Rao, Chi. Udaya Shankar, Sri Ranga, Geethapriya, Hamsalekha and Vijaya Narasimha - a rarity for Rajkumar movie. The album consists of six soundtracks. It was received exceptionally well by the critics and the audience.

| No. | Title | Lyrics | Singer(s) | Length |
|---|---|---|---|---|
| 1. | "Madhura Ee Kshana" | M. N. Vyasa Rao | Rajkumar, Manjula Gururaj | 4:49 |
| 2. | "Nambi Kettavarillavo" | Chi. Udaya Shankar | Rajkumar | 4:52 |
| 3. | "Bennina Hinde" | Sri Ranga | S. P. Balasubrahmanyam, Sangeetha Katti | 4:45 |
| 4. | "Sole Geluvendu Baalali" | Geethapriya | Rajkumar | 4:23 |
| 5. | "Naanu Naanu Neenu" | Hamsalekha | Rajkumar, S. P. Balasubrahmanyam, Manjula Gururaj, Sangeetha Katti | 4:57 |
| 6. | "Janakana Maatha" | Vijaya Narasimha | S. P. Balasubrahmanyam | 5:19 |
| Total length: | | | | 29:05 |

== Awards ==
- Karnataka State Film Award for Best Actor – Rajkumar
