= Mask (2025 film) =

2025 Tamil film by Vikarnan Ashok

- Theatrical release poster
- Directed by: Vikarnan Ashok
- Written by: Vikarnan Ashok
- Produced by: Vetrimaaran (presenter); Andrea Jeremiah; SP Chokkalingam
- Starring: Kavin; Andrea Jeremiah
- Narrated by: Nelson Dilipkumar
- Cinematography: R. D. Rajasekhar
- Edited by: R. Ramar
- Music by: G. V. Prakash Kumar
- Production companies: Grass Root Film Company (presents); Black Madras Films; The Show Must Go On
- Release date: 21 November 2025
- Running time: 127 minutes
- Country: India
- Language: Tamil

Mask is a 2025 Indian Tamil-language action thriller film written and directed by debutant Vikarnan Ashok. Produced jointly by The Show Must Go On and Black Madras Films, the film stars Kavin and Andrea Jeremiah in the lead roles.

Presented by Vetrimaaran's Grass Root Film Company, the film was tentatively titled Kavin 07, as it is the actor's seventh film as a lead actor, prior to its official announcement in May 2024. The official title was revealed along with the project announcement. Principal photography commenced the same month and was shot predominantly in Chennai. The film has entered its final stages of production. The music is composed by G. V. Prakash Kumar, with cinematography by R. D. Rajasekhar and editing by R. Ramar.

Mask was released in theatres on 21 November 2025 and received mixed to positive reviews from critics though it underperformed at the box office due to its high budget.

== Plot ==
Velu is a money-minded private detective who solves his client's problems but, unbeknownst to them, scams their accounts and cheats them due to his greed for money.

Meanwhile, Bhumi runs an NGO that provides free education and other essential facilities for children. However, she is later revealed to be involved in several illegal activities, including sex trafficking, under the guise of her charity.

A corrupt politician, Manivannan, is introduced, who wants to hide a huge sum of black money. He chooses Bhumi as the safest option and hands over the money to her, which she accepts in return for a share of the amount.

Soon, a mysterious masked gang is shown stealing the money from Bhumi. When the heist comes to her knowledge, she conceals the incident from the politician. She then orders Velu to find the robbers and forces him to recover the money at any cost. Velu, himself corrupt yet a skilled detective, risks his life while tracking down the masked gang.

How Velu finds the gang, what their true intentions are, and who Bhumi really is form the rest of the story.

== Cast ==
- Kavin as Velu
- Andrea Jeremiah as Bhumi / Varaprabhalakshi
- Ruhani Sharma as Radhi, Velu's love interest
- Komal Sharma as Kayal, Velu's wife
- Pawan Krishna as MLA Manivannan
- Charle as Sargunam "Guna", Velu's father-in-law
- Redin Kingsley as Attack Arun
- Ramesh Thilak as an advocate
- Kalloori Vinoth as Sub-Inspector Arul
- George Maryan as George, the president of a housing society
- Subramaniam Siva as Mathi
- Munnar Ramesh as Ramesh, Velu's father
- Venkat Senguttuvan as Battery
- Phathmen as Chandru
- Archana Chandhoke as Thaen, Chandru's wife
- Aadukalam Naren as an Advocate (uncredited cameo)
- Aruldoss as an Advocate (uncredited cameo)
- Sathyajith as an Advocate (uncredited cameo)
- Achyuth Kumar as Raathi's husband (uncredited)
- Nelson Dilipkumar as the narrator (voice-over)
- Vikarnan Ashok as a film director, one of Velu's clients (uncredited cameo)

== Production ==
=== Development ===
In April 2024, Andrea Jeremiah was reported to have been chosen to play the lead antagonist in Kavin's seventh film as a lead actor, tentatively titled Kavin 7. Reports further claimed that Vikarnan Ashok, a former assistant director to Vetrimaaran, would make his directorial debut with the project, while Vetrimaaran would produce it under his home banner, Grass Root Film Company. The production house made an official announcement on 17 May 2024, confirming the project and revealing the title Mask. The film marks the maiden production ventures of S. P. Chokkalingam and Andrea Jeremiah under the Black Madras Films banner and The Show Must Go On (TSMGO) banner respectively, and is presented by Vetrimaaran's Grass Root Film Company.

The film also stars Ruhani Sharma, Charle, Bala Saravanan, Archana Chandhoke and others in supporting roles. Ruhani would make her Tamil sophomore with this film and was cast opposite Kavin. Vetrimaaran was reported to have made a cameo appearance in the film. The technical crew includes music composer G. V. Prakash Kumar, cinematographer R. D. Rajasekhar, art director Jacki, editor R. Ramar and costume designers Poorthi-Vipin.

=== Filming ===
Principal photography began with an inaugural puja ceremony held on 17 May 2024 at a film city in Chennai, while the first shooting schedule commenced the last week of that month. The following month, Ruhani, through her social media accounts, posted a picture of the set. The image featured herself, Kavin and Vetrimaaran. A picture of the set was once again posted on Kavin's birthday, 22 June. The second schedule began on 11 July in Chennai. In late February 2025, the makers announced that the filming entered its final stage.

== Music ==
Mask

Soundtrack album by G. V. Prakash Kumar
- Genre: Feature film soundtrack
- Language: Tamil
- Label: T-Series
- Producer: G. V. Prakash Kumar

G. V. Prakash Kumar chronology
Idli Kadai (2025)	Mask (2025)	Parasakthi (2026)

Singles from Mask
- 1. "Kannumuzhi" Released: 6 October 2025; 2. "Idhudhan Engal Ulagam" Released: 12 November 2025; 3. "Cash Cash" Released: 15 November 2025; 4. "Vetri Veerane" Released: 20 November 2025

The soundtrack is composed by G. V. Prakash Kumar, in his first collaboration with Kavin. The first single "Kannumuzhi" was released on 6 October 2025. The second video single "Idhudhan Engal Ulagam" was released on 12 November 2025. The third video single "Cash Cash" was released on 15 November 2025.

Track listing
No.	Title	Lyrics	Singer(s)	Length
1.	"Kannumuzhi"	Karumathur Manimaran	Anthony Daasan, Sublahshini	3:45
2.	"Idhudhan Engal Ulagam"	Kaber Vasuki	Andrea Jeremiah, Ananthu, Smith Asher, Arulparan Vaaheesan Rasaiya	3:44
3.	"Cash Cash"	Kaber Vasuki	Suresh Peters, Karunas, Kaber Vasuki	3:28
4.	"Vetri Veerane"	Arulparan Vaaheesan Rasaiya	Anthony Daasan, Arulparan Vaaheesan Rasaiya	2:49

== Release ==
=== Theatrical ===
Mask was released in theatres on 21 November 2025. Earlier it was initially scheduled to be released in May 2025, but was postponed.

=== Home media ===
The post-theatrical streaming rights were acquired by ZEE5. it began streaming on 9 January 2026, while the satellite rights were bagged by Sun TV

== Reception ==
Abhinav Subramanian of The Times of India gave 3/5 stars and wrote "Director Vikarnan Ashok establishes their starting properties with clarity. [...] The dark comedy emerges naturally from watching bad people handle worse situations.There's amusement in watching these figures scheme against each other while hiding their own secrets. [...] Watching Mask feels like ordering a dish that looks great but tastes fine. You finish it without too many complaints and move on." Avinash Ramachandran of Cinema Express gave 2.5/5 stars and wrote "The film guises a story of right, wrong, and everything in between, under the garb of a money heist that is too much style, and unfortunately, not enough substance." Janani K of India Today gave 2.5/5 stars and wrote "Mask’ is a watchable thriller with neat performances. While there are enough moments to keep you hooked, there are also shortcomings that hold it back from being a well-rounded film." Bhuvanesh Chandar of The Hindu wrote "The many streaks of ingenuity that keep this dark crime-comedy afloat make you wish for a more confident film from debutant Vikarnan Ashok."
