= Prakash =

Name list

Prakash is a common masculine given name and surname in South Asia, widely used in Nepal, India and Sri Lanka. The word prakash is derived from the Sanskrit word prakāśa, meaning "bright light" or "sun light" or "moon light" or "light", from a combination of pra meaning "forth" and kāśa meaning "shining." Hence the meaning "luminous; shining forth". Metaphorically, it designates the person as a source of enlightenment or wisdom.

== Given name ==
Notable persons with this given name include:

- Prakash (film director), Indian Kannada film director
- Prakash Yashwant Ambedkar (born 1954), Indian politician from Maharashtra
- Prakash Amritraj (born 1983), Indian tennis player
- Prakash Amte, Indian medical doctor and social worker
- Prakash Bare, Indian Malayalam actor
- Prakash Bhandari (born 1935), Indian cricketer
- Prakash Dahake, Indian politician from Maharashtra
- Prakash Javadekar (born 1951), Indian politician from Madhya Pradesh
- Prakash Jha (born 1952), Indian film producer-director-screenwriter
- Prakash John (born 1947), Canadian rock bassist
- Prakash Karat (born 1948), Indian communist politician
- Prakash Mallavarapu (1949–2026), Indian Roman Catholic archbishop
- Prakash Mehra (1939–2009), Indian Hindi film producer and director
- Prakash Munda, Indian cricketer
- Prakash Padukone (born 1955), Indian badminton player
- Prakash Persad, Trinidad and Tobago politician
- Prakash Raj (born 1965), Indian film actor, director, producer and television presenter
- Prakash Vir Shastri (1923–1977), Indian politician from Uttar Pradesh
- Prakash Kumar Singh chairman of Steel Authority of India Limited

== Surname ==
- Aditya Prakash (architect) (1924–2008), Indian architect, painter, and author
- Aditya Prakash (badminton) (born 1990), Indian badminton player
- Amrita Prakash (born 1987), Indian actress in Hindi cinema
- Balaji Prakash (born 1968), Indian structural biologist and biochemist
- Cedric Prakash (born 1951), Indian Catholic priest and human rights activist
- Jose Prakash (1925–2012), Indian actor and singer in Malayalam cinema
- Khemchand Prakash (1907–1950), Indian musical composer for the Hindi film industry
- Madappa Prakash (born 1953), Indian-American physicist
- Neil Prakash, also known as Abu Khaled al-Cambodi (Arabic: أبو خالد الكمبودي), an Australian-born member of the Islamic State group
- Satya Prakash (physicist) (born 1929), Indian physicist
- Tejasswi Prakash (born 1993), Indian actress in Hindi television
- Uday Prakash (born 1952), Indian author, scholar, and journalist
- Varshini Prakash, American climate activist

== See also ==
- Prakash (film), 2022 Nepali film
- Prakasam district, a district in Andhra Pradesh, India
