= Pepe (2024 Indian film) =

2024 Indian Kannada film

- Theatrical release poster
- Directed by: Shreelesh S. Nair
- Written by: Shreelesh S. Nair
- Produced by: Uday Shankar S; B.M. Sriram Kolar
- Starring: Vinay Rajkumar; Mayur Patel; Kaajal Kunder
- Cinematography: Abhishek G. Kasaragod
- Edited by: Manu Shedgar
- Music by: Poornachandra Tejaswi
- Production companies: Uday Cine Venture; Deepa Films
- Distributed by: KRG Studios
- Release date: 30 August 2024
- Running time: 126 minutes
- Country: India
- Language: Kannada

Pepe is a 2024 Indian Kannada-language action drama film written and directed by Shreelesh S. Nair in his directorial debut. The film stars Vinay Rajkumar in the titular role, alongside an ensemble cast including Mayur Patel, Naveen D. Padil, Yash Shetty, Kaajal Kunder, Medini Kelamane, Raviprasad Mandya, Kitty Sridhar, Shashidhar Bhat, Bala Rajwadi, Aruna Balraj, Sandya Arekere, and Shivu Kabbanahalli.

== Cast ==
- Vinay Rajkumar as Pepe aka Pradeep
- Mayur Patel as Guna
- Naveen D. Padil as Rayappa
- Yash Shetty
- Kaajal Kunder
- Medini Kelamane
- Raviprasad Mandya
- Kitty Sridhar
- Shashidhar Bhat
- Bala Rajwadi
- Aruna Balraj as Sunitha
- Sandya Arekere
- Shivu Kabbanahalli
- Raghavendra Rajkumar as Bagappa (Cameo appearance)

== Production ==
=== Development ===
Shreelesh S. Nair got the idea to approach Vinay Rajkumar for the lead role after watching the teaser of the film Gramayana, in which the latter stars in the lead role. Stunt master Chethan D'Souza also recommended Shreelesh to narrate the story to Vinay. Upon hearing the narration, Vinay was drawn to the film due to its touch on social themes, specifically communalism and women's abuse, so he agreed to do it. They finalized the story, after which Shreelesh requested specific shots, including lifting the panche and wiping the face. Despite expectations of a longer session, the photoshoot was completed in just 15 minutes. The film was announced in April 2021. Mayur Patel was chosen to portray the role Guna. The film was produced by Uday Shankar S and B.M. Sriram Kolar under the banners of Uday Cine Venture and Deepa Films.

=== Filming ===
On 19 April 2021, Kaajal Kunder was reported to have joined the cast as the female lead, with filming commencing in Coorg. As of 18 January 2022, the makers had finished sixty percent of shooting, and reportedly planned to complete the rest once the third wave of the COVID-19 pandemic eased up. The filming was wrapped up on 17 November 2022. The action sequences were choreographed by Ravi Verma, Chethan D'Souza, Different Danny, and Narsimha. The cinematography was by Abhishek G Kasaragod, while the editing was handled by Manu Shedgar. The film received an A certificate from the Central Board of Film Certification.

== Soundtrack ==
Pepe

Soundtrack album by Poornachandra Tejaswi
- Released: 2024
- Genre: Feature film soundtrack
- Length: 3:30
- Language: Kannada
- Label: PRK audio

Poornachandra Tejaswi chronology
| Matinee (2024) | Pepe (2024) |

External music video
- Pepe - Preset on YouTube

The soundtrack was composed by Poornachandra Tejaswi.

Track listing
| No. | Title | Lyrics | Singer(s) | Length |
|---|---|---|---|---|
| 1. | "Pepe - Preset" | JG Kumara, Girijana Samagra Abhivruddhi Kala Samsthe | JG Kumara, Girijana Samagra Abhivruddhi Kala Samsthe | 3:30 |
| Total length: | | | | 3:30 |

== Release ==
=== Theatrical ===
The film was released theatrically on 30 August 2024.

=== Home media ===
The digital rights of the film were acquired by Amazon Prime Video.

== Reception ==
A Sharadhaa of The New Indian Express rated the film three out of five stars and wrote that "Pepe demands full attention as it navigates a complex web of storylines with an uneven narrative. The film’s experimental editing and non-linear approach, including the black-and-white versus colour technique for past and present scenes, add flair but can disrupt the flow." Y Maheswara Reddy of Bangalore Mirror gave it two-and-a-half out of five stars and wrote that "It is worth a watch only if you have the stomach for too much action."

Sridevi S of The Times of India gave it two-and-a-half out of five stars and wrote that "Shreelesh Nair has tried a very unconventional film in his debut attempt, but the movie keeps oscillating between an 'art film' that wants to be preachy and a commercial film that wants to entertain. However, it ends up being disappointing in both aspects." Shashiprasad SM of Times Now gave it two out of five stars and wrote, "Beyond appreciating Vinay Rajkumar's performance, the background score and the work of the action choreographers, Pepe is not an ordinary commercial entertainer. Maybe a classic work of art that is way beyond the understanding of ordinary and sane minds."

Pranati A S of Deccan Herald gave it two out of five stars and opined that "interesting visuals and powerful dialogues are diluted by blood and gore."

Vivek M. V. of The Hindu wrote that "Pepe is a violent film with plenty of action sequences. Some of the action scenes are choreographed creatively, yet, the gruesome fights don’t leave a lasting impact because of the sheer absence of drama in the second half. The blood-fest inevitably kills the intrigue in the movie." Sunayana Suresh of The South First gave it two-and-a-half out of five stars and wrote, "Pepe is worth watching for those interested in seeing the Kannada film industry explore new territory and support innovative projects. The film offers a fresh style and unique content. However, be prepared for a less engaging narrative, as the emphasis on style does not translate into substantial storytelling."
