= Magizhchi =

2010 film by V. Gowthaman

- Poster
- Directed by: V. Gowthaman
- Screenplay by: V. Gowthaman
- Based on: Thalaimuraigal by Neela Padmanabhan
- Produced by: D. Manivannan
- Starring: V. Gowthaman; Anjali; KarthikaRaj
- Cinematography: Chezhiyan
- Music by: Vidyasagar
- Production company: Athirvu Thiraipattarai
- Release date: 19 November 2010
- Country: India
- Language: Tamil

Magizhchi (transl. Happiness) is a 2010 Indian Tamil-language film directed by V. Gowthaman. It stars Gowthaman in the lead role with Anjali, Karthika, director Seeman and Prakash Raj playing important roles. The film, based on Neela Padmanabhan's novel Thalaimuraigal, was released on 19 November 2010.

== Plot ==
A doting brother gets his sister married into a nice family. A few months later, her husband sends her away. Disheartened, she comes to her brother who decides to restore peace in her married life.

== Cast ==
- V. Gowthaman as Thiravi
- Anjali as Kuzhali
- Karthika as Nagammai, Thiravi's sister
- Seeman as Kutralam
- Prakash Raj as Moses
- Sampath Raj as Sevatha Perumal
- Ganja Karuppu as Rasappan
- V. S. Raghavan as Thiravi's granduncle
- Sukumari as Thiravi's grandmother
- Anumol as Sasi
- Raju as Thiravi's father
- Pasanga Sivakumar as Kuzhali's father
- Azhagan Thamizhmani as Villager
- Manoj Kumar as Villager
- Veera Santhanam as Kannupillai, Sevatha Perumal's father
- Nellai Siva as Villager
- Siva Narayana Murthy as Shop owner
- Krishnamoorthy as Rasappan's brother-in-law
- T. K. Kala as Kuttiammai, Thiravi's mother
- Supraja as Visalam, Thiravi's sister
- Premalatha as Rasappan's sister
- Madurai Saroja as Sevatha Perumal's mother
- Rangammal Paati as Thiravi's grandaunt
- Risha Jacob as Dancer in "Pulippa Puliyanga"

== Production ==
The film was launched at AVM Studios on 28 October 2009.

== Soundtrack ==
Soundtrack was composed by Vidyasagar. Behindwoods wrote "Vidyasagar strictly adheres to the theme and tone of this rural story. But he also weaves in his creativity here and there. High on ‘native touch’, this album surprisingly dips a little where melody is concerned".

Song title	Singers	Lyrics
"Theakku Maramaattam"	Manickka Vinayakam, Velmurugan, Karisal Karunanithi	Vaiyyampatti Muthuswamy
"Otthhu Thanni Aathoda"	Karthik, Chandrayee	Vairamuthu
"Selai Kattiya Sevanthi"	Karthik, Roshini, Sithara	Vairamuthu
"Kanne Kaniyurangu"	Madhu Balakrishnan, Binny Krishnakumar	Patchaiappan
"Utchukotta Itchu Vachhu"	Gopal Rao, Rajalakshmi	Arivumathi
"Koorapattu Selaikkari"	Karthik	Patchaiappan

== Release and reception ==
The film was released on 19 November 2010 alongside Nagaram Marupakkam and Mandhira Punnagai.

The Hindu wrote "Even a slight slip could have made Magizhchi (U) an extension of a weepy Tamil soap. But V. Gowthaman's direction keeps the narration on track in this family drama set in 1989. Neela. Padmanabhan's ‘Thalaimuraigal' has been transformed into a fairly neat film". Behindwoods wrote "Magizhchi is a well made film about family relationships and social issues. However, it has its innate limitations in terms of being an entertainer. To the team’s credit, the movie has never aspired to be an entertainer that is out of the scope, the story permits. If you are the sentimental type whose idea of a village based film is not just ‘sickles and sevals’, then Magizhchi will make you happy". New Indian Express wrote "Appreciable is its ending, which is warm and positive. But this film could have been made in a way more appealing to the audience".
