= Rishi (2005 film) =

2005 film by Prakash

- VCD cover
- Directed by: Prakash
- Written by: M. S. Ramesh (Dialogues)
- Screenplay by: Prakash; M. S. Abhishek
- Story by: Prakash; M. S. Abhishek
- Produced by: J. Jayamma
- Starring: Shiva Rajkumar; Vijay Raghavendra; Sindhu Tolani; Radhika
- Cinematography: K. Krishnakumar
- Edited by: S. Manohar
- Music by: Gurukiran
- Production company: Sri Jaimatha Combines
- Distributed by: Jayanna Films
- Release date: 21 January 2005
- Running time: 149 minutes
- Country: India
- Language: Kannada

Rishi is a 2005 Indian Kannada-language action drama film directed and written by Prakash. The film stars Shiva Rajkumar, Vijay Raghavendra, Radhika and Sindhu Tolani in the lead roles along with Srinath and Avinash in other prominent roles. The score and soundtrack was by Gurukiran whose compositions were appreciated by critics and masses. The film ran for a hundred days and eventually went on to become one of the hits of the year 2005. The film was remade in Telugu as Bangaru Babu (2009).

== Plot ==
Rishi, the head of a college, is a rich man living with his loving family and is soon to be married to Sneha. He finds out that he has a stepbrother, Hari through his father's illegitimate relationship with a woman whom he loved. He couldn't reveal this earlier because of the fear of losing respect in the society. The son born out of such a relationship is Hari. His mother has died recently. Due to the illtreatment given by the society to himself and his mother, Hari has become addicted to drugs. What will Rishi do after knowing his father's truth? Will he change Hari's life? Will Rishi's family and society accept Hari as their family's son? This forms the crux of the film.

== Cast ==
- Shiva Rajkumar as Rishi
- Vijay Raghavendra as Hari
- Radhika as Spoorthi
- Sindhu Tolani as Sneha
- Srinath
- Doddanna
- Vinaya Prasad
- Ramakrishna
- Sumithra
- Avinash
- Sathyajith
- Bhanu Prakash
- Sridhar Raj
- Yamuna Murthy
- Rekha. V. Kumar
- Sindhu Chethan
- Badri Narayan
- John
- K. D. Venkatesh
- Anand Rao
- Niranjan Shetty
- Hari Das G.
- Ashok Rao
- Mandeep Roy
- Kishori Ballal
- Duniya Vijay as Drug peddler
- Karthik Sharma

== Soundtrack ==
Track listing
No.	Title	Lyrics	Singer(s)	Length
1.	"Laali Laali"	Kaviraj	P. Unnikrishnan, K. S. Chithra
2.	"Bhandanuru Bhandarella"	V. Manohar	Puneeth Rajkumar, Chaitra H. G.
3.	"Sogase Sogase"	V. Manohar	Gurukiran, Rajesh Krishnan, Chetan Sosca
4.	"Yenendu Naa Helalaare"	V. Manohar	Udit Narayan
5.	"Naanu Ottare"	V. Manohar	Raju Ananthaswamy, Gurukiran, Aaradhana
6.	"Yelellu Habba"	V. Manohar	Sonu Nigam, K. S. Chithra

== Reception ==
R. G. Vijayasarathy of IANS wrote that "'Rishi' is a must for all quality-conscious Kannada filmgoers". A critic from Viggy wrote that "In a nutshell, Rishi has everything on screen that the director desired - from aggression to affection; from sentiment to comedy; from seriousness to frivolousness. It's a cheer joy to watch a classy family entertainer". Deccan Herald wrote "The director has effectively handled the subject. The story moves smoothly in the first half but the second half is heavy with sentimental scenes. Still there is a freshness in narrating the story. With comedy, action, romance and sentimental scenes the director tries to make the film a mass entertainer". Sify wrote "The film is stylishly made with a wonderful subject along with sterling performance of Shivrajkumar, precise way of narration, three lovely tunes from Gurukiran and cinematography by Krishnakumar".

== Awards ==
- 2004–05 Karnataka State Film Awards
1. Best Screenplay - Prakash, Abhishek
2. Best Sound Recording - Murali
