= Siddhartha (2015 film) =

2015 film by Prakash

- Poster
- Directed by: Prakash
- Written by: Jayanth
- Produced by: Parvathamma Rajkumar
- Starring: Vinay Rajkumar; Apoorva Arora; Nikki Galrani; Shamanth Shetty
- Cinematography: A. V. Krishna Kumar
- Edited by: Sachin B. Ravi
- Music by: Songs: V. Harikrishna; Score: Stephen Prayog
- Production company: Sri Poornima Enterprises
- Release date: 23 January 2015
- Running time: 149 min
- Country: India
- Language: Kannada

Siddhartha is a 2015 Indian Kannada-language romance film directed by Prakash of Milana fame and produced by Parvathamma Rajkumar. The film stars Vinay Rajkumar, son of actor Raghavendra Rajkumar, in his debut, along with Apoorva Arora in the lead roles. The film has the musical score and soundtrack were composed by Stephen Prayog and V. Harikrishna, respectively. The film, launched officially on 2 May 2014 and released across cinema halls on 23 January 2015. The film was a box office hit.

== Cast ==
- Vinay Rajkumar as Siddhartha aka Siddu
- Apoorva Arora as Khushi
- Naina Puttaswamy as Divya
- Shamanth Shetty as Jani
- Alok Babu as Tsunami
- Jeevan Louis as Maamu
- Abhay Surya as TK
- Deepika das as Priya
- Achyuth Kumar as Mahadev, Siddhu's Father
- Ashish Vidyarthi as Yeshwanth, Khushi's Father
- Ashwini Gowda as Khushi's Mother
- Ashok
- M. S. Umesh as college principal
- Nikki Galrani as Anju (special appearance)
- Sadhu Kokila – special appearance
- Sudharani – special appearance
- Gurunandan as Rahul, Khushi's fiancee (Cameo appearance)
- Bommesh Y.D (Mandya)

== Soundtrack ==
Music composer Stephen Prayog scored the background music for the movie and soundtrack consisting of 6 tracks was composed by V. Harikrishna. The lyrics for the songs are written by Jayanth Kaikini.

Siddhartha

Soundtrack album by V. Harikrishna
- Released: November 2014
- Genre: Feature film soundtrack
- Label: Lahari Music

No.	Title	Singer(s)	Length
1.	"Free Idhe"	Armaan Malik
2.	"Jaadu Maadidanthe"	Armaan Malik
3.	"Achchaagide"	Armaan Malik, Archana Ravi
4.	"Ninninda Dooragi"	Raghu Dixit
5.	"Ninna Nenape"	Sonu Nigam
6.	"Goa Song"	Santhosh Venky

== Reception ==
GS Kumar of The Times of India rated the film 3.5/5 stars and wrote, "While the first half is brimming with energy — be it sequences of an 'antakshari competition, cricket match or college life — the second half aptly captures the plight of the pining lovers, tugging at your heartstrings". Shyam Prasad S of Bangalore Mirror rated the film 3/5 and wrote, "While the first half sustains interest with some innovative scenes, the second half drags a bit as the story loses way for a while before recovering towards a rather tepid and predictable end".
