= Kuldeep =

Kuldeep is a given male name. Notable people with the name include:

- Kuldeep Bishnoi (born 1968), Indian Member of Parliament
- Kuldeep Kumar (born 1950), Indian politician
- Kuldeep Manak (1951–2011), Indian Punjabi singer
- Kuldeep Pawar (1949–2014), Indian Marathi actor
- Kuldeep Raj, Indian politician
- Kuldeep Singh (music director), Indian music director
- Kuldeep Singh Brar (born 1934), Indian Army officer
- Kuldeep Singh Gangwar, Indian politician
- Kuldeep Singh Garcha, Indian polo player
- Kuldeep Yadav (born 1994), Indian cricketer
