= Prakash Veer (director) =

Indian film director

- Occupation: Film director
- Years active: 2003–present
- Notable work: Khushi, Milana, Vamshi

Prakash Veer, widely known as Milana Prakash, is an acclaimed Indian film director and screenwriter in the Kannada film industry. He is best known for directing blockbuster films such as Khushi (2003), Milana (2007) and Vamshi (2008). His works are noted for their emotional depth, family-centric narratives, and commercial success.

== Early life ==
Prakash was born in Karnataka, India. Before entering the film industry, he worked as an investment banker in the United Kingdom. His passion for cinema led him to quit his lucrative job and return to India to pursue filmmaking.

== Career ==
Prakash made his directorial debut in 2003 with Khushi, starring Vijay Raghavendra, which became a commercial success. He collaborated as a director and script-writer with Vijay in four consecutive films: Khushi (2003), Rishi (2005), Shree (2006) and Gokula (2009).

His breakthrough came in 2007 with Milana, starring Puneeth Rajkumar and Parvathy Thiruvothu. The film ran for 500 days in theaters, making it one of the longest-running Kannada films. Following this, he directed another hit, Vamshi (2008), also featuring Puneeth Rajkumar.

After a brief hiatus, Prakash returned with Siddhartha (2015), introducing Vinay Rajkumar, and later directed Tarak (2017) starring Darshan. His latest film, The Devil, featuring Darshan second time in his directorial, released in December 2025

Besides directing films, he also produced a Kannada teleserial named Lakumi under his home banner - Jai Mata Combines (Sri Jaimatha Combines).

== Filmography ==
Year	Film title	Notes
2003	Khushi	
2005	Rishi	Won - Karnataka State Film Award for Best Screenplay
2006	Shree	
2007	Milana	Won - Udaya Film Award for Best Director
2008	Vamshi	
2009	Gokula	
2015	Siddhartha	
2017	Tarak	
2025	The Devil	December 11th
