= 10 (2022 film) =

Kannada Feature Film

- Directed by: Karm Chawla
- Written by: Karm Chawla; Chandrajit Belliyappa; Anirudh Mahesh
- Produced by: Pushkara Mallikarjunaiah; Prem Bros
- Starring: Vinay Rajkumar
- Cinematography: Karm Chawla
- Edited by: Balashankar Menon
- Music by: Songs: Gagan Bedariya; Score: Swaroop S. R.
- Production companies: Pushkar Films; BSP Entertainment
- Release date: 16 December 2022
- Country: India
- Language: Kannada

10 is a 2022 Kannada-language film directed by Karm Chawla and starring Vinay Rajkumar in the role of a boxer, Gopal Deshpande as the coach and Anusha Raghunath as the boxer's love interest. The film is a sport drama exploring the life and struggles of a boxer. 10 was announced in May 2019 and the shooting commenced in September 2019, wrapping just three months later in December 2019. It was made with a budget of ₹70 lakh (US$73,000), and the production budget amounted to just under ₹50 lakh (US$52,000), thus setting the stone for a new generation of high quality low-budget Kannada flicks. Before the commencement of principal photography, actor Vinay Rajkumar trained intensely for his role as a Featherweight Boxer by having regular workouts and strict diet regimen for six months.

== Plot ==
The film is a look into the life of a boxer - Vijay Kumar who is accused of doping charges. He believes the culprit behind these changes is his coach who he has a frictional relationship with. Ultimately his struggle and journey along with his love Shruti, his coach and his manager is what the film portrays.

== Cast ==
- Vinay Rajkumar as Vijay Kumar
- Anusha Ranganath as Shruthi
- Gopal Krishna Deshpande as Pradeep Gowda
- Suvin Hegde as Shetty

== Release and reception ==
After experiencing numerous delays and financial constraints following the COVID-19 pandemic, 10 had a small theatrical release on 16 Dec 2022 with minimal publicity and promotions. A week later it was released on the streaming platform Amazon Prime.

Sree Vardhan Vellala for Deccan Herald wrote "One also wonders why the movie is named ‘10’. Except for the protagonist's jersey number, the number 10 has nothing much to do as far the film's theme or its conflicts are concerned."

The Times of India wrote "Sports dramas are predictable and Ten is no different. Like every film from that genre, Ten also speaks about the formulaic rise, fall, and rise of the hero. However, what is missing is the edge-of-the-seat adrenaline rush that such films provide. However, the parallels between a coach and student’s life and how a coach tries and fails to salvage his student’s career has been showcased well."

A Sharadhaa of Cinema Express rated 3 out of 5 stars and wrote "Karm Chawla’s film has above-average writing and direction, and hits the required highs, and delivers killer punches at the right moments."
