= Ananthu vs Nusrath =

- Film poster
- Directed by: Sudheer Shanbhogue
- Written by: Sudheer Shanbhogue
- Produced by: B. N. Sathish; B. T. Chandrashekar; H. S. Suresh
- Starring: Vinay Rajkumar; Latha Hegde; P. Ravishankar
- Cinematography: Abhishek G. Kasargod
- Edited by: Niranjan Devaramane
- Music by: Sunaad Gowtham
- Production company: Manikya Productions
- Release date: 28 December 2018
- Running time: 149 minutes
- Country: India
- Language: Kannada

Ananthu vs Nusrath is a 2018 Indian Kannada-language romantic comedy film written and directed by Sudheer Shanbhogue. Produced under the banner Manikya Productions, the film tells the love story between a lawyer and a judge. The film stars Vinay Rajkumar as Ananthu, a lawyer and Latha Hegde, a judge in the titular roles. The supporting cast includes P. Ravishankar, Guruprasad, Suchendra Prasad, B. Suresha, Naveen D. Padil among others. The film's score and soundtrack is composed by Sunaad Gowtham and cinematography is by Abhishek G. Kasargod.

The film released across Karnataka on 28 December 2018 and this marks the last release for the year in Kannada cinema.

== Synopsis ==
Anantha Krishna Kramadarithaya is a lawyer from an orthodox Brahmin family . Nusrath Fathima Beig is the judge from a Muslim family. The plot revolves around how the love blossoms in the heart of duo in spite of their different cultural background .

== Cast ==
- Vinay Rajkumar as Anantha Krishna Kramadharittaya / Ananthu
- Latha Hegde as Nusrath Fathima Baig / Nusrath
- Prajwal Devaraj as Nisar Ahmed (extend cameo)
- P. Ravishankar as Gavilingaswamy Kethamaranahalli
- B. Suresha as Shankara Narayana Kramdharittaya
- Guruprasad as G.P.
- S. K. Bhagavan as Senior advocate Bhagavan (Guest appearance)
- Suchendra Prasad as Raikar
- Naveen D. Padil as advocate Aithal
- H. G. Dattatreya as Zulfikar Ali Khan
- Harini Srikanth as Vathsala
- K. P. Sridhar as Asadulla Baig
- Ashvithi Shetty as Uma Maheswari
- Vishwa Vijeth Gowda as Tyagaraja
- Nayana as Santana Lakshmi
- Ashwin Hassan as Manjunath
- Sandeep as Aniketh

== Soundtrack ==
Ananthu Vs Nusrath

Soundtrack album by Sunaad Gowtham
- Released: 1 November 2018
- Recorded: 2018
- Genre: Feature film soundtrack
- Label: PRK Audio
- Producer: Sunaad Gowtham

Sunaad Gowtham has scored the soundtrack and score for the film. A total of six songs and one theme track were composed by him. The lyrics for the two songs are adapted from the poetry of the renowned poets Kuvempu and Amir Khusrow The audio is released on 1 November 2018 and is owned by actor Puneeth Rajkumar's PRK Audio label.

Track listing
| No. | Title | Lyrics | Singer(s) | Length |
|---|---|---|---|---|
| 1. | "Eega Thaane Jaariyagide" | Siddhu Kodipura | Vijay Prakash | 4:18 |
| 2. | "Pyaar Moula" | Arasu Anthare, Dheeraj Shetty | Rajath Hegde, Kailash Kher | 4:32 |
| 3. | "Zihal-E-Miskin" | Amir Khusrow | Ninaada Nayak | 4:27 |
| 4. | "Ommeyu Thirugi" | Param Bharadwaj | Ninaada Nayak | 4:25 |
| 5. | "Eega Thaane Jaariyagide (Reprise)" | Siddhu Kodipura | Vijay Prakash | 3:57 |
| 6. | "Yaava Kaalada" | Kuvempu | Dr. Nithin Acharya | 3:59 |
