= Vinay Rajkumar =

Indian actor (born 1989)

- Born: 7 May 1989 (age 37); Bangalore, Karnataka, India
- Occupation: Actor
- Years active: 1993-1999; 2012–present
- Father: Raghavendra Rajkumar
- Relatives: See Rajkumar family

Vinay Rajkumar (born 7 May 1989) is an Indian actor who works in Kannada cinema. The grandson of actor Rajkumar and son of film producer and actor Raghavendra Rajkumar, he made his debut as a lead actor in 2014 with Siddhartha.

== Early life ==
Vinay Rajkumar was born to actor and film producer Raghavendra Rajkumar and Mangala. He is the grandson of actor Rajkumar. He has a younger brother, Yuva Rajkumar. The actors Shiva Rajkumar and Puneeth Rajkumar are his paternal uncles. Vinay earned a bachelor's degree in commerce from St. Joseph's College of Commerce, Bangalore.

Vinay's grandfather, Rajkumar, brought him on-screen at the age of four in the film Aakasmika (1993). Vinay followed this with appearances in Odahuttidavaru (1994), his father's film's Anuragada Alegalu (1993) and Navibbaru Namagibbaru (1993), and uncle Shiva's Om (1995) and Hrudaya Hrudaya (1999).

Vinay studied and trained as an actor in "acting workshops with a couple of people" before "training... in theatre". He subsequently trained in dance and martial arts from trainers of his uncles' films. In an interview with The Times of India in 2012, he said he was "involved with the filming of [uncle Puneeth's film] Yaare Koogadali", having already worked in the filming of the latter's previous film Anna Bond (2012).

== Career ==
After completing his education and training in acting, dance, and martial arts, Vinay made his debut as a lead actor in 2015 with Siddhartha, directed by Prakash. The romantic drama earned him the SIIMA Award for Best Debut Actor (Male), marking a promising start to his career.

In 2016, Vinay starred in Run Anthony, an action thriller directed by Raghu Shastry. The film showcased him in a high-energy role as Antony, blending suspense and romance. The movie received mixed reviews.

Vinay expanded his repertoire with Ananthu Vs Nusrath (2018), a romantic drama where he played an advocate entangled in a cross-cultural love story. The film was critically acclaimed and highlighted Vinay’s ability to handle nuanced roles.

Vinay returned to the big screen with 10 (2022), a sports drama, and followed it up with romantic entertainer Ondu Sarala Prema Kathe (2024) and the action-packed Pepe (2024). His upcoming films include Andondittu Kaala (2025) and Graamaayana (2026), signaling a strong comeback phase with diverse roles

== Filmography ==
Key
†	Denotes films that have not yet been released

- Note: He was credited as Master Vinay Raghavendra from 1993 to 1999.

Year	Title	Role	Notes	Ref.
1993	Anuragada Alegalu	Running boy	Child artist; cameo appearance in the song "Ambarada Taare"	
1993	Navibbaru Namagibbaru	Boy with cattle	Child artist	
1993	Aakasmika	Boy in horse drawn carriage	Child artist; uncredited cameo appearance in the song "Huttidare Kannadanalli"	
1994	Odahuttidavaru	Vinu	Child artist	
1995	Om	Satya and Madhu's son	Child artist; uncredited	
1999	Hrudaya Hrudaya	Vinu	Child artist	
2015	Siddhartha	Siddhartha		
2016	Run Antony	Antony		
2018	Ananthu Vs Nusrath	Ananthu		
2022	10	Vijay Kumar		
2024	Ondu Sarala Prema Kathe	Athishay		
2024	Pepe	Pepe		
2025	Andondittu Kaala	Kumara		
2026	Graamaayana	Seena		
2026	City Lights	Shiva		

== Awards ==
South Indian International Movie Awards

- 2016: Best Debut Actor – Siddhartha
