= Milana (film) =

2007 Indian Kannada-language film directed by Prakash

- Theatrical release poster
- Directed by: Prakash
- Written by: M. S. Ramesh (Dialogues)
- Screenplay by: Prakash; M. S. Abhishek
- Story by: Prakash; M. S. Abhishek
- Produced by: K. S. Dushyanth
- Starring: Puneeth Rajkumar; Parvathy; Pooja Gandhi
- Cinematography: K. Krishnakumar
- Edited by: S. Manohar
- Music by: Mano Murthy
- Production companies: Sri Chowdeshwari Cine Creations; Sri Jaimatha Combines
- Release date: 14 September 2007 (India)
- Running time: 155 minutes
- Country: India
- Language: Kannada

Milana (transl. Rendezvous) is a 2007 Indian Kannada-language romantic comedy drama film co-written and directed by Prakash, starring Puneeth Rajkumar and Parvathy in lead roles. The film was Parvathy's debut in Kannada cinema. The movie also features Pooja Gandhi, Dileep Raj, Sumithra and Mukhyamantri Chandru in prominent roles. Music for the film was composed by Mano Murthy.

Upon theatrical release on 14 September 2007, the film saw massive commercial success and completed a 500-day run in theatres making it the longest running Indian film ever in the history of multiplexes. it collected ₹56 crore against the budget of ₹5 crore and it became one of the highest grossing Kannada movies of 2007. Puneeth's performance won him the Karnataka State Film Award for Best Actor. The film was dubbed into Malayalam as Ishtam Enikkishtam.

The film was remade in Odia in 2014 as Something Something 2 and in Bengali in 2016 as Ki Kore Toke Bolbo thereby becoming the fourth Kannada movie after Anuraga Aralithu, Appu and Mungaru Male to be remade in two non-Hindi non-South Indian languages. The 2013 Tamil film Raja Rani was reported to have been inspired by this movie.

== Plot ==
Aakash, a RJ for Radio Mirchi station in Bangalore, is married to Anjali in Mysore. On their first night, Anjali demands a divorce from Aakash. Instead of showing any kind of frustration, Aakash calmly agrees to give divorce to Anjali, on the condition that it would happen after they move to Bangalore and also requests Anjali to keep this as a secret from his parents, as he fears they would not be able to handle it. Anjali agrees; it is revealed that Anjali was never interested in the wedding as she was already in love with Hemanth, whom she is also struggling to find after her father forbade her to see him again. Aakash had married Anjali due to his parents' wishes, as his love interest Priya is married to a police officer.

As the days pass, Aakash and Anjali face off on various fronts, clearly letting it show that their marriage is on the rocks. However, when Aakash rescues his neighbor from a local goon, Anjali realizes that Aakash is not such a bad person after all. She requests Aakash to help her find Hemanth, to which he agrees. Soon, Aakash manages to locate Hemanth, and also keeps his word by applying for divorce, and as per the rules, the court grants them six month's time if they want to reconsider their application. Anjali learns that Hemanth is a fraud and had demanded money from Anjali's father to end his relationship with her, which leaves her devastated as she feels that her whole life is now ruined.

Dejected, Anjali attempts suicide only to be saved by Aakash in the nick of time. Post this event, Aakash and Anjali undergo a transformation where Aakash helps and motivates Anjali overcome her depression. He made Anjali recognize that her life is full and she should live that life full of happiness. Akash helped her achieve her dream of studying abroad and made all the arrangements to send her to the US for her studies. At the same time Akash also helped his neighbour Ravi marry his girlfriend, whose family was forcing her to marry another man. These events made Akash win Anjali's respect and they become best friends. Soon enough, Anjali realizes that she has fallen for Aakash, who had helped her through so many hardships. However, she realizes that she cannot express her love to him as it would make her look small in Aakash's eyes. Caught in a perpetual emotional dilemma, she struggles to hide her feelings from him. A few days later, the court summons them and approves their divorce.

Anjali is once again devastated as Aakash feels no remorse in signing the papers. Anjali decides that she cannot stay in India anymore and decides to move to the US. However, Aakash begins to feel a strange sense of loss after he bids Anjali goodbye. He later realizes that Anjali was in love with him by seeing the divorce agreement, in which she signed as 'Anjali Akash' which she refused to sign when the application was submitted. And Akash too realizes that he was also in love with her. Aakash rushes to the airport to prevent her from leaving the country. After a tense fight between Hemanth (who wants to avenge the humiliation when Aakash had thrashed him in the nightclub) and his henchman. Aakash and Anjali reunite where he jokingly taunts Anjali that now he has to eat bread jam for the rest of his life, which she always cooked for him as she does not know how to cook.

== Cast ==
- Puneeth Rajkumar as Aakash
- Parvathy as Anjali, Aakash's wife
- Pooja Gandhi as Priya, Aakash's ex-love interest
- Dileep Raj as Hemant, Anjali's ex-love interest
- Sumithra as Aakash's mother
- Mukhyamantri Chandru as Aakash's father
- Sihi Kahi Chandru as Flat Manager
- Rangayana Raghu as Kubera
- Apoorvashree as Kubera's wife
- Shobaraj as a goon
- Niranjan Shetty as Ravi, Aakash's friend
- Sanchita Shetty as Ravi's love interest
- Suresh Mangalooru as Anjali's father
- Shankar Rao as Akash's neighbour
- B. Jaya as Akash's neighbour's wife
- M. S. Umesh as A. Madhusudhan Rao, a divorce lawyer
- Shankar Bhat
- Nagathihalli Chandrashekhar in a guest appearance as a senior lawyer
- Kishori Ballal in a guest appearance
- Akul Balaji as Priya's husband, a police officer

== Production ==
Parvathy Thiruvothu—who was then known mononymously as Parvathy—was incorrectly named Parvathy Menon in promotional media after a reporter assumed that to be her last name.

== Soundtrack ==
Milana

Soundtrack album by Mano Murthy
- Released: 22 June 2007
- Genre: Feature film soundtrack
- Label: Anand Audio
External audio
- Official Audio Jukebox on YouTube

The soundtrack is made up of the following songs:

No.	Title	Lyrics	Singer(s)	Length
1.	"Ninnindale"	Jayanth Kaikini	Sonu Nigam	4:53
2.	"Kaddu Kaddu"	V. Nagendra Prasad	Stephen, Chaitra H. G, Suresh Peters	6:41
3.	"Male Nintu Hoda Mele" (Duet)	Jayanth Kaikini	Shreya Ghoshal, Sonu Nigam	6:04
4.	"Antu Intu"	Jayanth Kaikini	Udit Narayan, K. S. Chithra	4:55
5.	"Kivi MaaTondu"	Jayanth Kaikini	Kunal Ganjawala	4:53
6.	"Madarangiyalli"	Jayanth Kaikini	Rajesh Krishnan, Shreya Ghoshal	5:39
7.	"Ninnindale" (Remix)	Jayanth Kaikini	Sonu Nigam	4:31
8.	"Male Nintu Hoda Mele" (Solo)	Jayanth Kaikini	Shreya Ghoshal	6:04

== Critical response ==
R. G. Vijayasarathy from Rediff.com rating 3.5 out of 5 and stating that "Puneet Rajkumar has shown a lot of maturity in his performance. Pooja Gandhi, the 'Mungaru Male' heroine impresses by her song with Puneet is certainly the highlight of the film. Parvathi has done her best. A critic from The Times of India wrote that "DIRECTOR Prakash has churned out a neat film. There is action for Puneeth fans, pathos for family, romance for teens and melody for music lovers".

== Box-office ==
The film successfully ran for 50 days in 137 centers in Karnataka, and 100 days in 50 centers, 175 days in 7 centres and 450 Days in PVR, Bangalore which records only the second Indian movie to see a run of more than 365 days in any Indian multiplex after Mungaru Male and the longest running Indian Film in the history of multiplexes.

== Awards ==
Filmfare Awards South

- Best Music Director for Mano Murthy
- Best Male Playback Singer for Sonu Nigam to the song "Ninnindale"
- Nominated - Filmfare Award for Best Actor - Kannada - Puneeth Rajkumar
- Nominated - Filmfare Award for Best Actress - Kannada - Parvathy Thiruvothu

=== State awards ===
- Best Actor – Puneeth Rajkumar (Won)
