= 56th Filmfare Awards South =

Award ceremony for South Indian films

- Date: Friday 31 July 2009
- Site: Hyderabad, India
- Hosted by: Purab Kohli
- Produced by: Idea

Highlights
- Best Picture: Moggina Manasu (Kannada); Thirakkatha (Malayalam); Subramaniapuram (Tamil); Gamyam (Telugu)
- Most awards: Thirakkatha (6; Malayalam)
- Most nominations: Gaalipata (11; Kannada); Mussanjemaatu (11; Kannada)

The 56th Filmfare Awards South ceremony honored its selection of the best South Indian films of 2008 and was held on Friday, 31 July 2009, in Hyderabad, India.

== Nominations ==
The nominees for the 56th Filmfare Awards were announced live on Monday, 16 June 2009, at 12:00 a.m. IST (7:30 UTC) by Filmfare chief editors in Mumbai. The winners were announced during the awards ceremony on 31 July 2009, in Hyderabad.

The Filmfare Best Film Award is given by the Filmfare magazine as part of its annual Filmfare Awards for Hindi films.

The award was first given in 1954. Here is a list of the award winners and the nominees of the respective years. Each individual entry shows the title followed by the production company, and the producer.

=== Multiple nominations and awards ===
The following films received multiple nominations.

==== Kannada ====
- Nominations
  - 11 nominations: Gaalipata and Mussanjemaatu
  - 9 nominations: Moggina Manasu
  - 8 nominations: Taj Mahal
- Awards
  - 5 awards: Moggina Manasu
  - 3 awards: Gaalipata
  - 2 awards: Mussanjemaatu

==== Malayalam ====
- Nominations
  - 9 nominations: Thirakkatha
  - 6 nominations: Calcutta News and Mulla
  - 5 nominations: Gulmohar, Innathe Chintha Vishayam and Veruthe Oru Bhavya
- Awards
  - 6 awards: Thirakkatha
  - 2 awards: Madambi

==== Tamil ====
- Nominations
  - 8 nominations: Vaaranam Aayiram
  - 7 nominations: Subramaniyapuram and Yaaradi Nee Mohini
  - 6 nominations: Dasavathaaram
  - 4 nominations: Anjathe and Santosh Subramaniam
- Awards
  - 5 awards: Vaaranam Aayiram
  - 3 awards: Subramaniyapuram

==== Telugu ====
- Nominations
  - 7 nominations: Jalsa and Kotha Bangaru Lokam
  - 6 nominations: Gamyam
  - 4 nominations: Kantri, Parugu and Ready
- Awards
  - 5 awards: Kotha Bangaru Lokam
  - 4 awards: Gamyam
  - 1 award: Ashta Chamma, Kantri and Parugu

== Awardees ==
- Winners in **bold**, nominees listed under.

=== Kannada cinema ===
Best Film	Best Director
**Moggina Manasu – E. Krishnappa**; Aramane – K. Manju; Gaalipata – A. M. Rathnam; Psycho – Gurudutt; Taj Mahal – Shivashanker Reddy Jigale	**Shashank – Moggina Manasu**; Devadatta – Psycho; Mahesh – Mussanjemaatu; R. Chandru – Taj Mahal; Yogaraj Bhat – Gaalipata
Best Actor	Best Actress
**Ganesh – Gaalipata**; Ajay Rao – Taj Mahal; Sudeep – Mussanjemaatu; Upendra – Buddhivantha; Yash – Moggina Manasu	**Radhika Pandit – Moggina Manasu**; Daisy Bopanna – Gaalipata; Pooja Gandhi – Taj Mahal; Ramya – Mussanjemaatu; Suhasi – Haage Summane
Best Supporting Actor	Best Supporting Actress
**Yash – Moggina Manasu**; Ananth Nag – Aramane; Ananth Nag – Taj Mahal; Diganth – Gaalipata; Rajesh Krishnan – Gaalipata	**Shubha Poonja – Moggina Manasu**; Anu Prabhakar – Mussanjemaatu; Bhavana Rao – Gaalipata; Neethu – Gaalipata; Padmaja Rao – Taj Mahal
Best Music Director	Best Lyricist
**V. Harikrishna – Gaalipata**; Abhimann Roy – Taj Mahal; Mano Murthy – Moggina Manasu; Raghu Dixit – Psycho; V. Sridhar – Mussanjemaatu	**Jayanth Kaikini – "Minchaagi Neenu Baralu" – Gaalipata**; R. Chandru – "Khushiyaagide" – Taj Mahal; Ramnarayan – "Nodalenthu" – Mussanje Maathu; Shashank – "Moggina Manasali" – Moggina Manasu; V. Sridhar – "Yenagali Mundhe Saagu" – Mussanjemaatu
Best Male Playback Singer	Best Female Playback Singer
**Sonu Nigam – "Yenagali Mundhe Saagu" – Mussanjemaatu**; Gurukiran – "Kolle Nannanne" – Aramane; Kunal Ganjawala – "Kaddalu Manasanna" – Mussanjemaatu; Raghu Dixit – "Ninna Poojege Bandhe" – Psycho; Sonu Nigam – "Mayavagide Manasu" – Haage Summane	**Shreya Ghoshal – "Ninna Nodalenthu" – Mussanjemaatu**; K. S. Chithra – "Nadheem Dheem Tana" – Gaalipata; Shreya Ghoshal – "Moggina Manasali" – Moggina Manasu; Shreya Ghoshal – "Aakasha Bhoomi" – Mussanjemaatu; Sunidhi Chauhan – "Rock Me Baby" – Haage Summane

=== Malayalam ===
Best Film	Best Director
**Thirakkatha – Ranjith**; Calcutta News – Thampi Antony; Gulmohar – Uttam Jhavar; Innathe Chintha Vishayam – Antony Perumbavoor; Veruthe Oru Bharya – Salavudeen	**Ranjith – Thirakkatha**; Akku Akbar – Veruthe Oru Bharya; Blessy – Calcutta News; Jayaraj – Gulmohar; Madhupal – Thalappavu
Best Actor	Best Actress
**Lal – Thalappavu**; Dileep – Calcutta News; Jayaram – Veruthe Oru Bharya; Mohanlal – Akasha Gopuram; Ranjith – Gulmohar	**Priyamani – Thirakkatha**; Gopika – Veruthe Oru Bharya; Meera Jasmine – Calcutta News; Meera Nandan – Mulla; Padmapriya – Panchamara Thanalil
Best Supporting Actor	Best Supporting Actress
**Anoop Menon – Thirakkatha**; Biju Menon – Mulla; Indrajith – Calcutta News; Jayasurya – Minnaminnikoottam; Siddique – Gulmohar	**Sukanya – Innathe Chintha Vishayam**; Geetu Mohandas – Akasha Gopuram; Mohini – Innathe Chintha Vishayam; Roma – Minnaminnikoottam; Samvrutha Sunil – Thirakkatha
Best Music Director	Best Lyricist
**Sharreth – Oduvil Oru Sonarekha – Thirakkatha**; Ilaiyaraaja – Kandu Kandu – Innathe Chintha Vishayam; Jayachandran – Ammamazhakkaar – Madambi; Johnson – Kaanum Kanninu – Gulmohar; Vidyasagar – Kannin Vathil – Mulla	**Girish Puthenchery – "Amma Mazhakkar" – Madambi**; Anil Panachuran – "Kadalolam Vatsa" – Minnaminnikoottam; O. N. V. Kurup – "Amme Nee Oru" – Mizhikal Sakshi; Rafeeq Ahmed – "Arikil Nee" – Thirakkatha; Vayalar Sarath Chandra Varma – "Enguninnu Vanna" – Calcutta News
Best Male Playback Singer	Best Female Playback Singer
**K. J. Yesudas – "Amma Mazhakkar" – Madambi**; Devanand – "Kannin Vathil" – Mulla; M. G. Sreekumar – "Kandu Kandu" – Innathe Chintha Vishayam; Madhu Balakrishnan – "Arikil Nee" – Thirakkatha; Unni Menon – "Omkaram Shankil" – Veruthe Oru Bharya	**K. S. Chithra – "Oduvil Oru" – Thirakkatha**; Aparna Rajeev – "Manju Thara" – Mizhikal Sakshi; Gayatri – "Kannin Vathil" – Mulla; Manjari – "Kadaloram Vatsa" – Minnaminnikoottam; Rimy Tomy – "Aarumugham" – Mulla

=== Tamil ===
Best Film	Best Director
**Subramaniyapuram – Sasikumar**; Anjathe – Nemichand Jhabak; Dasavathaaram – Oscar Ravichandran; Santosh Subramaniam – Kalpathi S. Agoram; Vaaranam Aayiram – Oscar Ravichandran; Yaaradi Nee Mohini – N. V. Prasad	**Sasikumar – Subramaniyapuram**; Gautham Vasudev Menon – Vaaranam Aayiram; K. S. Ravikumar – Dasavathaaram; Mithran Jawahar – Yaaradi Nee Mohini; M. Raja – Santosh Subramaniam; Myshkin – Anjathe
Best Actor	Best Actress
**Suriya – Vaaranam Aayiram**; Dhanush – Yaaradi Nee Mohini; Jayam Ravi – Santosh Subramaniam; Kamal Haasan – Dasavathaaram; Narain – Anjathe	**Parvathy Thiruvothu – Poo**; Asin Thottumkal – Dasavathaaram; Genelia D'Souza – Santosh Subramaniam; Nayantara – Yaaradi Nee Mohini; Sneha – Pirivom Santhippom; Swathi – Subramaniyapuram; Trisha Krishnan – Abhiyum Naanum
Best Supporting Actor	Best Supporting Actress
**Ajmal Ameer – Anjathey**; Prakash Raj – Abhiyum Naanum; Prasanna – Anjathe; Sampath Raj – Saroja; Samuthirakani – Subramaniyapuram	**Simran – Vaaranam Aayiram**; Aishwarya – Abhiyum Naanum; Khushbu – Pazhani; Lakshmi Rai – Dhaam Dhoom; Saranya Mohan – Yaaradi Nee Mohini
Best Music Director	Best Lyricist
**Harris Jayaraj – Vaaranam Aayiram**; A. R. Rahman – Sakkarakatti; James Vasanthan – Subramaniyapuram; Vijay Antony – Kadhalil Vizhunthen; Yuvan Shankar Raja – Yaaradi Nee Mohini	**Thamarai – "Nenjukkul Peithidum" – Vaaranam Aayiram**; Na. Muthukumar – "Mudhal Mazhai" – Bheema; Thamarai – "Kangal Irandal" – Subramaniapuram; Vaali – "Kallai Mattum" – Dasavathaaram; Vairamuthu – "Vaa Vaa" – Abhiyum Naanum
Best Male Playback Singer	Best Female Playback Singer
**Naresh Iyer – "Mundhinam Paarthene" – Vaaranam Aayiram**; Belly Raj – "Kangal Irandal" – Subramaniapuram; Hariharan – "Nenjukkul Peithidum" – Vaaranam Aayiram; Karthik – "Oru Naalukkul" – Yaaradi Nee Mohini; Krish – "Yaaro Manathile" – Dhaam Dhoom; Vijay Antony – "Nakka Mukka" – Kadhalil Vizhunthen	**Deepa Miriam – "Kangal Irandal" – Subramaniapuram**; Bombay Jayashree – "Yaaro Manathile" – Dhaam Dhoom; Sadhana Sargam – "Mukundha Mukundha" – Dasavathaaram; Shreya Ghoshal – "Thaen Thaen" – Kuruvi; Swetha – "Kandaen Kandaen" – Pirivom Santhippom

=== Telugu ===
Best Film	Best Director
**Gamyam – Saibabu Jagarlamudi**; Ashta Chamma – Ram Mohan; Jalsa – Allu Aravind; Kotha Bangaru Lokam – Dil Raju; Parugu – Dil Raju; Ready – Ravi Kishore	**Radhakrishna Jagarlamudi – Gamyam**; Bhaskar – Parugu; Ravi Babu – Nachavule; Srinu Vaitla – Ready; Trivikram Srinivas – Jalsa; V. V. Vinayak – Krishna
Best Actor	Best Actress
**Allu Arjun – Parugu**; NTR Jr – Kantri; Pawan Kalyan – Jalsa; Ram – Ready; Ravi Teja – Krishna	**Swathi – Ashta Chamma**; Ileana D'Cruz – Jalsa; Kamalini Mukherjee – Gamyam; Shweta Prasad – Kotha Bangaru Lokam; Trisha Krishnan – Krishna
Best Supporting Actor	Best Supporting Actress
**Allari Naresh – Gamyam**; Brahmanandam – Ready; Jagapati Babu – Kathanayakudu; Prakash Raj – Kotha Bangaru Lokam; Srinivas Avasarala – Ashta Chamma	**Jayasudha – Kotha Bangaru Lokam**; Meera Jasmine – Gorintaku; Parvati Melton – Jalsa; Poonam Kaur – Souryam; Tabu – Pandurangadu
Best Music Director	Best Lyricist
**Mickey J. Meyer – Kotha Bangaru Lokam**; Devi Sri Prasad – Jalsaa; Mani Sharma – Kantri; Shekar Chandra – Nachavule; Vishal–Shekhar – Chintakayala Ravi	**Sirivennela Seetarama Sastri – "Entavaraku" – Gamyam**; Chandrabose – "Enduko" – Chintakayala Ravi; Sirivennela Sitaramasastri – "Chalore Chalore" – Jalsaa; Suddala Ashok Teja – "Matrudevobhava" – Pandurangadu; Veturi – "Vayassunamee" – Kantri
Best Male Playback Singer	Best Female Playback Singer
**Karthik – "Nijangaa Nenenaa" – Kotha Bangaru Lokam**; N. C. Karunya – "Andamaina Kalala" – Baladur; Ranjith – "Entavaraku" – Gamyam; S. P. Balasubrahmanyam – "Matrudevobhava" – Pandurangadu; Saketh – "Nammavemo Ganee" – Parugu	**Shweta Pandit – "Nenani Neevani" – Kotha Bangaru Lokam**; Geetha Madhuri – "Ninne Ninne" – Nachavule; Sadhana Sargam – "Ninnenaa Nenu" – Salute; Shreya Ghoshal – "Merupulaa" – Chintakayala Ravi; Sunitha Upadrashta – "Vayassunamee" – Kantri

=== Other awards ===
(No nominees for these awards)

- Best Male Debutant: **Shanthnoo Bhagyaraj** – Sakkarakatti (Tamil)
- Best Female Debutant: **Meera Nandan** – Mulla (Malayalam)
- Best Choreography: **Prem Rakshith** – Kantri (Telugu)
- Best Cinematographer: **S. Krishna** – Haage Summane (Kannada); **Chota K. Naidu** – Kotha Bangaru Lokam (Telugu)
- Lifetime Achievement Award: **Veturi**

== See also ==
- Filmfare Awards South
- Filmfare Awards
- 2008 in film
- International Tamil Film Awards
- Tamil Nadu State Film Awards
- Nandi Awards
