= Vaare Vah =

- DVD cover
- Directed by: Vijayalakshmi Singh
- Written by: Dialogue: G Magesh Kumar; Shankar Billemane
- Based on: Aga Bai Arrecha!
- Produced by: Jai Jagadish
- Starring: Komal; Bhavana Rao
- Cinematography: Ajay Vincent
- Edited by: B. S. Kemparaju
- Music by: Avinash-Vishwajeeth
- Production company: J J Productions
- Release date: 31 December 2010
- Running time: 133 minutes
- Country: India
- Language: Kannada

Vaare Vah (transl. Wow!) is a 2010 Indian Kannada-language comedy drama film directed by Vijayalakshmi Singh and produced by her husband Jai Jagadish. The film stars Komal and Bhavana Rao with Umashree, Mayuri and Padmaja Rao in supporting roles.

The film is a remake of the Marathi film Aga Bai Arrecha! (2004), which itself was based on What Women Want (2000). The film was a box office success.

== Cast ==
- Komal as Adesh "Adi" Deshpande
- Bhavana Rao as Roopa
- Umashree as Bangari
- Mayuri as Adi's boss
- Padmaja Rao as Adi's mother
- Parvathi as Adi's girlfriend
- Kishori Ballal as Adi's grandmother
- Honnavalli Krishna
- Karibasavaiah
- Tabla Nani as Motorcycle rider
- Mithra
- Kuri Prathap as Adi's friend
- Abhinayashree in a special appearance in song "Sarrantha Tirgutte"

== Production ==
The film notably featured forty-five women aged five to sixty in supporting roles. This is Bhavana Rao's second film after Gaalipata (2008). The film gained pre-release buzz when Komal dressed as an ardhanarishvara (Shiva half-male and half-female) in posters. According to the director, he did so because his character understands women more and more as the film progresses.

== Soundtrack ==
The music was composed by Avinash-Vishwajeeth.

Track listing
No.	Title	Lyrics	Singer(s)	Length
1.	"Athmiya Manase"	Sudheer Atthavar	Shankar Mahadevan	4:27
2.	"Hanimyale Bhagya"	V. Manohar	Fayaz Khan	2:28
3.	"He Nari Ninagyare"	Kaviraj	Vijay Yesudas	4:11
4.	"Udho Udho"	V. Manohar	Fayaz Khan	2:49
5.	"Athmiya Manase"	Sudheer Atthavar	Farhad Bhiwandiwala	4:30
6.	"Sarrantha Tirgutte"	V. Nagendra Prasad	Shamitha Malnad	4:09
Total length:				22:34

== Reception ==
A critic from DNA wrote that "Komal is entertaining and manages to carry the film on his shoulders. The many women in the film have bit roles, but each of them impresses, be it Bhavana as the wife, Mayuri as the boss, or Parvathy as the girlfriend". A critic from IANS gave the film a fraction of 2 1/2 out of 5 and wrote that "It is a Komal's [sic] film all the way as he tries to infuse laughs in every moment of the film. He once again proves his exceptional talent in essaying comedy oriented roles".
