= Mussanjemaatu =

- Directed by: Mussanje Mahesh
- Written by: Mussanje Mahesh
- Produced by: Suresh Jain
- Starring: Sudeep; Ramya; Anu Prabhakar
- Cinematography: Sundarnath Suvarna
- Edited by: Sri Crazymindz
- Music by: V. Sridhar
- Release date: 16 May 2008
- Country: India
- Language: Kannada

Mussanjemaatu (transl. Evening Talk) is a 2008 Indian Kannada-language romance film starring Sudeep and Ramya. The film was directed by Mussanje Mahesh. The movie is produced by Suresh Jain. The music of the film was launched on 4 April 2008. The movie was released on 16 May 2008 in India. It was released in the United States and in Toronto on 30 November 2008. This film became a comeback for Sudeep after a huge flop. The film was remade in Bengali as Achena Prem.

== Plot ==
The film revolves around the life of a Radio Jockey, Pradeep (Sudeep), who runs a radio programme called "Mussange Maathu" for depressed people. Tanu (Ramya) is a depressed girl who comes to Bangalore to live with her friend (Anu) and to find a new life. One day she calls Pradeep's radio programme and becomes very impressed by his suggestion.

Meanwhile, Pradeep and his team go to the streets of Bangalore to raise funds, to help a diseased person. There, he comes across Tanu and both become good friends, as days pass by.

Actually, Pradeep has been in love with Tanu since the very first moment he saw her on a train journey from Hubli to Bangalore. However, she doesn't realize his love for her and is about to marry someone else. Whether Pradeep is able to express his love forms the rest of the story.

== Cast ==
- Sudeep as RJ Pradeep
- Ramya as Tanu
- Anu Prabhakar as Shwetha
- Arya as Sangeetha
- Ramesh Bhat as Tanu's father
- Sumithra as Pradeep's mother
- Padma Vasanthi as Tanu's mother
- Meghashree Bhagavatar
- Mandya Ramesh as Ramesh
- Gangavathi Pranesh as Pranesh
- Krishnegowda M. N. as radio station head
- Yathiraj as Yathi
- Honnavalli Krishna as Kalappa
- M. S. Umesh
- Neenasam Ashwath as Ranganna
- Mussanje Mahesh
- Ravitheja
- Vardhan Theerthahalli
- Mahendra
- Shiv Naik (Kanakapura)

== Soundtrack ==
Mussanjemaatu

Soundtrack album by V. Sridhar
- Released: 4 April 2008
- Recorded: 2008
- Genre: Feature film soundtrack
- Length: 36:39
- Label: Jhankar Music
External audio
- Official Audio Jukebox on YouTube

V. Sridhar composed the film's background score and music for its soundtrack, who also wrote the lyrics for three tracks; Kaviraj, Revanna, V. Manohar, Bhaskar Gubbi and Ram Narayan wrote lyrics for one track each. The soundtrack album consists of eight tracks.

Track listing
No.	Title	Lyrics	Singer(s)	Length
1.	"Enaagali"	V. Sridhar	Sonu Nigam	5:56
2.	"Akasha Bhoomi"	V. Sridhar	Shreya Ghoshal	4:33
3.	"Anuraga Aralo"	Kaviraj	Karthik	5:38
4.	"Hethavala Muddu"	Revanna	Nanditha	2:42
5.	"Kaddalu Manasanna"	V. Manohar	Kunal Ganjawala	4:54
6.	"Mussanje Mathali"	Bhaskar Gubbi	Hemanth Kumar	3:02
7.	"Ninna Nodalentho"	Ram Narayan	Sonu Nigam, Shreya Ghoshal	4:46
8.	"Oh Hrudaya"	V. Sridhar	Udit Narayan	5:08
Total length:				36:39

== Reception ==
A critic from Sify wrote that "Debutant director Mahesh has shown high degree of skill and his concern towards the social issues is clearly evident. He has banked on the emotions, a bit of comedy, good music and cinematography to invite the audience to the theatres". A critic from Rediff.com wrote that "Mahesh should be complimented for making a clean and likeable film at a time when the Kannada film industry is full of gore and gangsters".

== Awards and nominations ==
Awards and nominations
Award	Wins	Nominations
Filmfare Awards South	2	9
- Totals
Awards won	2
Nominations	9

56th Filmfare Awards South :-

- Best Male Playback Singer - Kannada - Winner - Sonu Nigam for the song "Enagali Munde Saagu Nee"
- Best Female Playback Singer - Kannada - Winner - Shreya Ghoshal for the song "Ninna Nodalento"
- Best Director - Kannada - Nominated - Mussanje Mahesh
- Best Actor - Kannada - Nominated - Sudeep
- Best Actress - Kannada - Nominated - Ramya
- Best Supporting Actress - Kannada - Nominated - Anu Prabhakar
- Best Music Director - Kannada - Nominated - V. Sridhar
- Best Male Playback Singer - Kannada - Nominated - Kunal Ganjawala for the song "Kaddalu Manasanna"
- Best Female Playback Singer - Kannada - Nominated - Shreya Ghoshal for the song "Aakasha Bhoomi"
- Best Lyricist - Kannada - Nominated - Ramnarayan for the song "Ninna Nodalento"
- Best Lyricist - Kannada - Nominated - V. Shridhar for the song "Enagali Munde Saagu Nee"

== Remake ==
Mussanje Maatu has been remade in Bengali unofficially with the name Achena Prem (2011). All Kannada songs have been retained in the Bengali version.
