= Taj Mahal (2010 film) =

2010 Indian Telugu-language film

- Poster
- Directed by: Arun Singaraju
- Screenplay by: Arun Singaraju
- Based on: Taj Mahal by R. Chandru
- Produced by: Sivaji
- Starring: Sivaji; Nushrratt Bharuccha
- Cinematography: V. Srinivas Reddy
- Edited by: V. Nagi Reddy
- Music by: Abhimann Roy
- Production company: Sri Sivaji Productions
- Release date: 20 March 2010
- Country: India
- Language: Telugu

Taj Mahal is a 2010 Indian Telugu-language film directed by Arun Singaraju, starring Sivaji and Nushrratt Bharuccha. The film received mixed to positive reviews and the film's soundtrack was praised. It is a remake of the 2008 Kannada film of the same name.

== Cast ==
- Sivaji as Ajay Kumar
- Nushrratt Bharuccha as Shruti
- Kota Srinivasa Rao as Venkateswarlu, Ajay's father
- L. B. Sriram as Villager
- Nassar as Sruthi's father
- Vijay Sai as Swami, Ajay's roommate
- Brahmanandam
- Pragathi as Sruthi's mother
- M. S. Narayana as Hostel Warden
- Venu Madhav as Ajay's college mate
- Chitram Srinu as Ajay's college friend
- Raghu Babu as Shankar Anna
- Jeeva as Kittayya
- Sangeeta as Ajay's mother
- Aarthi Agarwal as Lecturer Maisamma (special appearance)
- D. Ramanaidu as himself (in a cameo appearance)
- Kadambari Kiran as Narayana, money lender

== Production ==
Hindi actress Nushrratt Bharuccha made her Telugu debut with this film under the stage name of Shruti. USA-trained Arun Singaraju was to direct a Hyderabad Blues-esque film but changed his mind after meeting Sivaji on the sets of Indumathi (2009). Sivaji debuted as a producer with this film and he bought the remake rights after the success of the Kannada original. Aarthi Agarwal, whose career hit a low point, did an item number in the film.

== Soundtrack ==
The music was composed by Abhimann, who reused the songs from the original film.

No.	Title	Singer(s)	Length
1.	"Nuvante Istamani"	Malavika
2.	"Emantha Neram"	Hariharan, Pranavi
3.	"Nee Meedey"	Karthik
4.	"Manasu Nippula"	Haricharan
5.	"Challani Premaku"	Vijay Yesudas
6.	"Etu Choosina"	Kunal Ganjawala
7.	"Prema Ee Vinta"	G. Venugopal
Total length:			28:06

== Reception ==
Jeevi of Idlebrain.com opined that Sivaji gave "his career’s finest performance" and wrote that "On a whole, Taj Mahal is a decent movie with a message supporting parents".
