= Taj Mahal (2008 film) =

2008 Indian Kannada-language romantic drama film

- Theatrical poster
- Directed by: R. Chandru
- Written by: R. Chandru
- Produced by: T. Shivashankar Reddy
- Starring: Ajay Rao; Pooja Gandhi; Rangayana Raghu; Ananth Nag
- Cinematography: K. S. Chandrashekar
- Edited by: K. M. Prakash
- Music by: Abhimann Roy
- Production company: Shiva Shakthi Enterprises
- Release date: 25 July 2008
- Running time: 154 minutes
- Country: India
- Language: Kannada

Taj Mahal is a 2008 Indian Kannada-language romantic drama film directed and written by R. Chandru, starring Ajay Rao and Pooja Gandhi. Produced by T. Shivashankar Reddy, the film is Chandru's directoral debut. The film was released on 25 July 2008, and had a 200-day run in Karanataka. Music director Abhimann Roy was awarded the Best Music Director accolade at the Karnataka State Film Awards for his film score. Taj Mahal was one of the most successful Kannada-language films of 2008. It was remade in Telugu under the same title in 2010.

== Plot ==
A college student and aspiring film director is kicked out of his house in a village by his father after he bunks classes and spends most of his time watching movies in theatres. Dejected, he takes a bus ride and starts reading a diary found on the seat next to his.

Ajay Kumar, an honest, poor boy from a village, hands over a lost suitcase to the police. He tells them that his name is Kumar and leaves his cell number. Shruthi, the owner of the suitcase, is elated when she recovers her father's suitcase, and calls Kumar to thank him.

They speak over the phone many times and gradually fall in love. Incidentally they both study in the same engineering college, but Shruthi knows her lover only as Kumar. In college he is known as Ajay. Shruthi is not aware that Ajay and Kumar are the same person and flatly rejects Ajay when he proposes to her. Eventually Ajay is expelled from his college due to neglecting his studies in pursuit of Shruthi. In confusion and deep agony, Ajay decides to go back to his village. In a series of events Shruthi finds out that Ajay is none other than Kumar, then Shruthi and the aspiring film director and goes to his village to meet Ajay aka Kumar but a villager informs her that Ajay met with an accident and has died at the spot, his mother has died from the shock and his father has become a mentally imbalanced person. The villager further explains that Ajay's life and story is now used as a cautionary tale for children to not sacrifice their education for the sake of romance. Shruthi gets shocked, goes to the gravestone of Ajay with agony, and the film ends in tragedy.

== Cast ==
- Ajay Rao as Ajay Kumar
- Pooja Gandhi as Shruti
- Ashok
- Vishwanath Mundasada
- Kirange Naga
- Anant Nag as Narayan Murthy, Shruthi's father
- Rangayana Raghu as Shankar
- Honnavalli Krishna as Krishna
- Mohan Juneja
- Pranaya Murthy
- N. T. Jayaram Reddy
- Narasimha Bharathi
- Height Manju
- Padmaja Rao as Shruti's mother
- E. Krishnappa as himself (uncredited)

== Production ==
Director R. Chandru stated that the film would be based on his life as an aspiring film director. He stated, "I had cherished dreams of becoming a director since my childhood. My father, being a farmer, did not like the idea. He used to beat me when I bunked school and watched a movie at touring talkies near my village. I had to run away from home to realise my ambition. I thought it would be nice to tell the future directors that hard work and dedication are musts to realise their ambition. I conveyed this through Taj Mahal." He wrote the story after completing his graduation and was partly financed by a farmer by ₹3 lakh, who wanted a role for himself in the film.

It was reported in November 2007 that Sunil Raoh would play the lead role in the film opposite Pooja Gandhi. Chandru had stated that Rajkiran would play a pivotal role in the film, and that "the film relates to the element of love". He added that filming would take place in Kullu–Manali, Taj Mahal, Bangalore, Mysore and in the periphery of Sakleshpur, and that it would begin on 17 December. However, Raoh backed out, citing personal reasons. Ajay Rao, who had one successful role in the film Excuse Me (2003), replaced him.

Upon the film's release, some viewers called Chandru, accusing him of basing the film on their lives. Chandru dismissed these claims and stated that the film was based on events in a friend's life. Speaking of the film's making in a 2017 interview, Chandru recalled, "The film progressed slowly but steadily. I would work as a director during the day and as a cook at nights. Me and the producers hired a small room, where we slept on mats... Soon, the film was complete and released. But the same day there was a bomb blast in one of the theatres and all theatres were empty. My stomach churned as the producer had put his all in this film. I broke down. But, the next day when the theatres opened, Taj Mahal was running houseful across Karnataka. It had a successful run and created history."

== Soundtrack ==
Taj Mahal

Soundtrack album by Abhimann Roy
- Released: 2008
- Genre: Feature film soundtrack
- Length: 30:09
- Label: Skanda Audio

The music of the film was composed by Abhimann Roy. The soundtrack album consists of seven tracks. It won Roy the Karnataka State Film Award for Best Music Director for 2008–09. The track "Kushiyagide" was received well.

No.	Title	Lyrics	Singer(s)	Length
1.	"Hoovantha Preethi"	K. Kalyan	Hariharan, Supriya Lohith	5:16
2.	"Kushiyagide Eko Ninnindale"	R. Chandru	Kunal Ganjawala	4:37
3.	"Nee Nanna Manasinali"	Abhimann Roy	Rajesh Krishnan	5:20
4.	"Neenendu Nannavanu"	R. Chandru	Shreya Ghoshal	4:55
5.	"Kolluvudaadare Kondubidu"	Manju Honnavar	Badri Prasad	3:48
6.	"Preethi Annnodu"	Lokesh Krishna	Chetan Sosca	1:39
7.	"Ibbaru Preethina"	Manjunath Lava	Abhimann Roy	4:34
Total length:				30:09

== Release and reception ==
Taj Mahal had gained popularity due to its soundtrack album having been received well. The film was slated for release on 18 July 2008, but was postponed to avoid clash with Moggina Manasu, and released a week later, on 25 July. It was released simultaneously in Karnataka and in the UK, the first for a Kannada film.

=== Critical response ===
Rediff.com awarded the film 3.5 stars out of 5, writing, "Taj Mahal blends pure romance with a right portion of sentiment and a bit of humour. And it is ably complemented by its excellent music and brilliant cinematography. The film also underlines the importance of parents' contribution to the future of their children, and how such an important factor is missed out by today's youngsters... Performance-wise, Ajay has come out with his best till date. The actor, who made a very good first impression with Prem's Excuse Me, has bounced back with this powerful performance. Pooja Gandhi looks stunning and has worked hard to give a very strong performance." Indiaglitz.com rated the film 7.5 out of 10 and stated that Ajay Rao "has done his role quite comfortably. Pooja Gandhi the heroine to watch on Kannada screen has been very good in emotions." Sify rated the film 4 out of 5 and wrote that Rao "has done it impressively and he is looking for a major breakthrough. Pooja Gandhi looks pretty and has done a good job. Suresh Mangalore Rangayana Raghu and Ananthnag are apt."

=== Box-office ===
The film was released in Karnataka and completed a 200-day theatrical run. It was reported to have completed 100-day runs at 11 centers.

== Awards and nominations ==
Ceremony	Category	Nominee	Result	Ref.
56th Filmfare Awards South	Best Actress	Pooja Gandhi	Nominated	
56th Filmfare Awards South	Best Actor	Ajay Rao	Nominated	
56th Filmfare Awards South	Best Director	R. Chandru	Nominated	
56th Filmfare Awards South	Best Music Director	Abhimann Roy	Nominated	
56th Filmfare Awards South	Best Supporting Actor	Ananth Nag	Nominated	
56th Filmfare Awards South	Best Supporting Actress	Padmaja Rao	Nominated	
56th Filmfare Awards South	Best lyricist	R. Chandru	Nominated	
2008–09 Karnataka State Film Awards	Best Music Director	Abhimann Roy	Won	
