= Charminar (2013 film) =

- Film poster
- Directed by: R. Chandru
- Written by: R. Chandru
- Produced by: R. Chandru
- Starring: Prem; Meghana Gaonkar
- Cinematography: K. S. Chandrashekar
- Edited by: K. M. Prakash
- Music by: Hari
- Production company: R. Chandru Films
- Release date: 8 February 2013
- Running time: 147 minutes
- Country: India
- Language: Kannada
- Box office: ₹ 5.7 crores

Charminar is a 2013 Kannada romantic drama film written, directed and produced by R. Chandru, featuring Prem and Meghana Gaonkar in the lead roles. The film deals with the life of a man in comparison with the famous monument Charminar in Hyderabad, that symbolises four important pillars: family, guru, friends and lover.

Charminar was produced by R. Chandru films and the soundtrack composed by newcomer Hari, former guitarist based out of Hyderabad. In 2015, the film was remade in Telugu by the same director as Krishnamma Kalipindi Iddarini and in Odia as Gapa Hele bi Sata. The director has claimed the 2018 Tamil movie 96 (as well as its 2019 Kannada remake and 2020 Telugu remake) have similarities with this movie.

== Plot ==
The film begins with a press meet for the launch of R. Chandru's film Charminar. At the press meet, Chandru states that Charminar is based on a true story and begins narrating the story. A group of childhood friends decide to have a class reunion of their school mates. They call various classmates, including their friend Mohana, who is working at a software company in US. After hearing the news, Mohana flies to India to attend the reunion; on the way, he reflects on his friends and his love life in his school days.

Past: As a village boy, Mohana and his troupe of friends were often mischievous, and Mohana especially initially planned on failing school and becoming a farmer with his father, but he instead stayed in school. One day, an intelligent girl named Radha transfers into Mohana's class. Mohana falls for Radha and becomes very studious. The two form a friendship and develop feelings for each other, but Mohana struggles to confess his love to Radha. One day in PUC, Mohana writes a love letter to Radha, but Radha's mother finds it and asks the school principal to take action.

The principal tells Mohana to hide in a closet and calls Radha and asks her about love, to which Radha states that nothing is stronger than her love for her mother, which breaks Mohana's heart. The principal tells Mohana that his studies are more important and that he should let go of love. Mohana and Radha eventually drift apart, but rekindle their friendship in Bangalore, where both of them are going to college. In particular, Radha gifts Mohana a book about doing well with internal exams. However, Radha abruptly ends her studies because of her mother's illness, and informs Mohana just before she leaves. Radha says she will return, but she never does.

Meanwhile, Mohana lands a good job and attributes it to Radha's gift. He gets promoted to the CEO position in the company's American branch, and gets his first salary. To celebrate, Mohana goes back to his village and gives gifts to his parents. He goes to Radha's house to give her a gift as well, but notices that her house is locked. He visits his principal, who confesses that he too loved someone and studied hard, but she married someone else as her parents wanted her to marry an engineer/doctor, not a professor. The principal advises Mohana to pursue his love so he does not end up with the same failure.

The next day, Mohana visits Radha with the intent of confessing his love. However, Radha's mother asks him to not do so, as Radha is now fatherless and marrying her to Mohana would bring ill-luck to Radha and Mohana's family, especially given Mohana's newfound stature. She begs Mohana to leave her daughter; Mohana reluctantly agrees and goes to America.

Present: The school reunion is underway, and Radha is nowhere to be seen. Mohana gives a heartfelt speech during the event, thanking all the teachers that helped the students to where they are today, and eventually concluding with an emotional thank-you to Radha, although he does not name her. Mohana opts to visit Radha at her house, where she is chopping vegetables on the floor. Mohana notes that Radha's mother had died, and she had to discontinue any further studies.

To his shock, Mohana finds that Radha had lost her left leg. Radha explains that she and her mother were going to the hospital but they were hit by a car, killing Radha's mother on impact and crushing Radha's leg. Mohana confesses his love to Radha and states that from now on, he will be her support and will always be there for her, and Radha emotionally obliges.

After the flashback, Chandru states that Radha and Mohana have arrived at the press meet. After press photographs with the cast and crew, the film ends with the title clap by Shiva Rajkumar.

== Cast ==
- Prem as Mohana
- Meghana Gaonkar as Radha
- Kumuda
- Rangayana Raghu
- Raju Talikote
- Suresh Mangalore
- Padmini Prakash
- Gaurish Akki
- Gunavantha Manju
- Vidya Murthy
- B. V. Radha
- Mohan Juneja
- Kaddi Vishwa
- R. G. Vijayasarathy
- Madhugiri Prakash

== Production ==
=== Casting ===
Initially, actors Ganesh, Ajay Rao and Srinagar Kitty were considered to play the male lead in the film. Ajay and Kitty had worked in Chandru's previous films, but both backed out citing prior commitments. Though Ganesh was ready to act in the film, Chandru could not afford the remuneration Ganesh had asked. Finally Prem was approached for the role and he accepted the offer. Meghana Gaonkar was chosen to play the lead female role of Radha.

=== Filming ===
Completing two schedules of shooting, director R Chandru moved to Bidar, Bijapur, Sakleshpur and other locations for the songs, with three days of shoot held in USA. The opening song for protagonist was shot there. R Chandru disclosed that sets were erected for the film in the ancient places like Hemagiri and Srirangapatna.

== Soundtrack ==
Charminar

Soundtrack album by Hari
- Released: 14 December 2012
- Genre: Feature film soundtrack
- Length: 28:33
- Label: Jhankar Music

Charminar has music from newcomer Hari. Lyricists Lokesh Krishna wrote 5 songs and Mahesh Jeeva has written one song. The tracks "Radhe Radhe" and "Nanna Yedeya" received appreciation and good reviews upon release. The album consists of seven tracks.

No.	Title	Lyrics	Singer(s)	Length
1.	"Olava Modala"	Lokesh Krishna	Hari	4:45
2.	"Olavina Jothe"	Lokesh Krishna	Hari, Anuradha Bhat	4:51
3.	"Aa Chigurina"	Mahesh Jeeva	Hari, Kunal Ganjawala	3:29
4.	"Nanna Yedeya"	Lokesh Krishna	Hari	6:01
5.	"Cindrella Cindrella"	Lokesh Krishna	Hari, Tippu	4:37
6.	"Kanna Neeru"	Lokesh Krishna	Hari, Shilpa	2:50
7.	"Moda Thanna"		Hari	2:00

== Critical reception ==
Upon theatrical release, Charminar received generally positive reviews from critics.

A critic from The Times of India gave the film a rating of four stars out of five and praised the director stating, "Director R Chandru has excellently captured the feelings of a youth who struggles to convey his feelings to his girlfriend." Srikanth Srinivasa of Rediff too gave the film a rating of 3.5/5 and wrote "R Chandru, who made Taj Mahal has exceeded expectations and surprised audiences with Charminar, which strikes an emotional chord with the audience".

Y. Maheswara Reddy from DNA gave the film three stars out of five and wrote "The film focuses on the role of teachers in moulding students as better citizens, and the director deserves a pat on his back for conveying the message sensitively" . A Shardhha of The New Indian Express wrote "All songs are hummable, coming out by a newcomer, Hari, a former guitarist with the original score for the film by Gurukiran. KS Chandrashekar's cinematography is excellent with the movie having some cool visuals. A neat job by the editing desk. The Verdict: A humble effort which has brought Chandru back into spotlight".

B S Srivani from Deccan Herald wrote "Her minimal expressions are sufficient for the character – her eyes doing most of the talking, like in the scene where the lovers unite. Chandru doesn’t preach but manages to put across his message effectively. Families can have a good outing at Charminar". A critic from News18 wrote "All the other artists have done their best. 'Radhey radhey' is the best pick among all the songs composed by Hari. 'Charminar' has a huge emotional appeal and will attract the family audience and youngsters". A critic from Bangalore Mirror wrote "Prem and Meghana have justified their roles and within a few scenes dispel any misgivings. There are inconsistencies and many minor inattention to detail. Prem as a US Senate member is taking imagination too far. All pardoned for making a film that is worth more than a watch".

=== Box office ===
It completed 100 days at the box office.
