= Bheema Theeradalli =

2012 film by Om Prakash Rao

- Theatrical release poster
- Directed by: Om Prakash Rao
- Written by: M. S. Ramesh
- Screenplay by: Omprakash rao
- Based on: North karnataka gangster Chandappa Harijana's Life Story
- Produced by: Anaji Nagaraj
- Starring: Duniya Vijay; Umashree; Pranitha
- Cinematography: Anaji Nagaraj
- Edited by: S. Manohar
- Music by: Abhiman Roy
- Production company: Namana Films
- Distributed by: Jayanna Films
- Release date: 6 April 2012
- Running time: 160 minutes
- Country: India
- Language: Kannada
- Budget: ₹ 4 crores

Bheema Theeradalli is a 2012 Kannada biopic action film directed by Om Prakash Rao and produced-shot by cinematographer Anaji Nagaraj. The film stars Duniya Vijay and Pranitha Subhash. Controversial Excise minister in the State Cabinet of Karnataka Renukacharya makes his acting debut in a special appearance role.

Composer Abhiman Roy has composed the score and soundtrack. Duniya Vijay plays a role who is a Dalit bandit (Chandappa Harijan). The film released across the cinema halls on 6 April 2012. The story is based on the life and times of Chandappa Harijana.

== Production ==
The film's shooting began on the auspicious day of Ugadi in 2011. It is based on the character ‘Chandya’, one of the members of a dreaded gang who adds a human touch to his work.

The plot is based on real-life incidents. Actor Vijay of Duniya fame was hired with full swing for the action role. Pranitha, Prajwal Bopaiah, Doddanna, Umasri, Shobharaj are others who make up the cast. Anaji Nagaraj, a reputed cameraman and producer in the Kannada film industry was happy with the film making news before the release. The film has been marketed by Prasad of "Sammarth Ventures".

== Cast ==
- Duniya Vijay as Chandrappa
- Pranitha as Bheemavva
- Doddanna as Chandappa, father
- Sharath Lohitashwa as Mallappa Desai, Lokapapa's son
- Prajwal Bopaiah
- Umashree as Chandappa's sister
- Srinivasa Murthy Bheemavva, Chandappa's mother
- Shobharaj as Police who arrests Chandappa Starting
- Renukacharya in a special appearance
- Suchendra Prasad as home minister
- Bharath Reddy as SP Bharath
- Enagi Nataraj

== Title controversy ==
Chandappa was entangled in a controversy due to its previous title Bheema Theeradalli. The film's title apparently enraged the Korma community members in Karnataka. The community members felt that the film-maker has criticized their community. Thus Korma community members had complained against the director Om Prakash Rao. The community members have asked for an apology from the director. However the director dismissed all allegations terming that the film has nothing to do with the community as such. Later, the title was changed to Chandappa due to the protests the previous name generated.

== Soundtrack ==
Bheema Theeradalli

Soundtrack album by Abhimann Roy
- Released: 2012
- Recorded: 2012
- Genre: Feature film soundtrack
- Length: 8:30
- Language: Kannada

Official audio
- Bheema Theeradalli - Full Album on YouTube

Track listing
No.	Title	Singer(s)	Length
1.	"Manase Ondu Saari"	Badri Prasad, Supriya Ramakrishnayya	4:14
2.	"Veerabhadra"	L R Ram, G G Murthy	4:16
Total length:			08:30

== Reception ==
=== Critical response ===
A critic from The Times of India scored the film at 3.5 out of 5 stars and says "Vijay deserves a pat on his back for his marvellous performance. Praneetha is impressive. Umashri is amazing. Suchendra Prasad and Sharath Lohithashwa have given life to their roles. Music by Abhiman Roy and camera by Anaji Nagaraj are special attractions. MS Ramesh has some catchy dialogues for you". S Viswanath from Deccan Herald wrote "Pranitha is there as pretty prop to pontificate in the end on the hazards of taking violent route to serve one’s people. Discerning cinegoers can safely give Bheema Theeradalli a miss". A critic from Bangalore Mirror wrote "The first half of Bheema... runs like a fast-paced thriller. If only Rao was bold enough to tell the whole truth, Bheema... would have ranked much higher on every scale. He does not let go of his fetish for heroine’s legs and cleavage either. Praneetha looks out of place in the film with her short skirts and revealing tops". Y Maheswara Reddy from DNA wrote "The film is worth a watch if you want to know about Chandappa of Bheematheera, and have the patience to cope with the extremely gory scenes, else it is quite simply, avoidable".

== Accolades ==
The dialogue writer M. S. Ramesh won the Karnataka State Film Award for Best Dialogue Writer for this film.

Ceremony	Category	Nominee	Result
2nd South Indian International Movie Awards	Best Actor	Duniya Vijay	Nominated
2nd South Indian International Movie Awards	Best Actress	Pranitha Subhash	Nominated
2nd South Indian International Movie Awards	Best Actress in a Supporting Role	Umashree	Nominated
2nd South Indian International Movie Awards	Best Actor in a Negative Role	Sharath Lohitashwa	Nominated
