= Padmaja Rao =

Indian actress and director

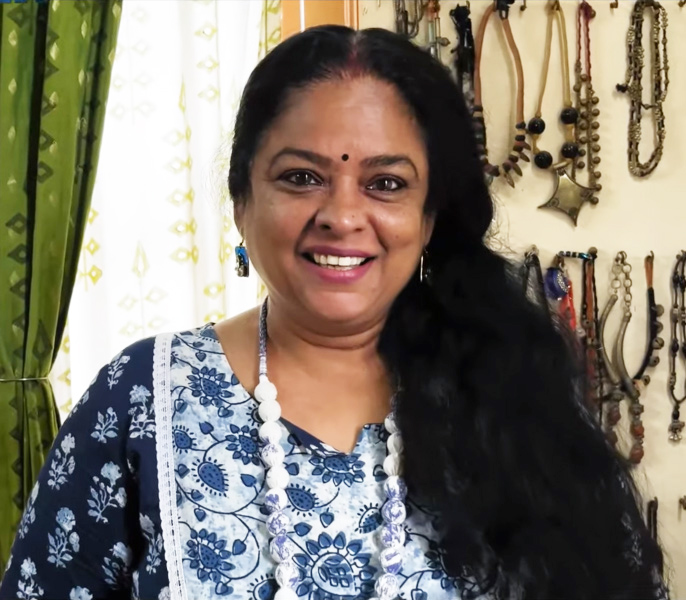
- Padmaja Rao in 2022
- Born: Mysore, Karnataka, India
- Citizenship: Indian
- Occupations: Actress; television director; television producer; presenter
- Years active: 1996–present
- Spouse: Prakash
- Children: 1

Padmaja Rao is an Indian actress, television soap director and producer known for her work Kannada television and Kannada cinema. She is a versatile actor known for playing a wide variety of character roles in various film genres. Some of the notable films of Padmaja Rao as an actress include Hatavadi (2006) Mungaru Male (2006), Gaalipata (2008), Ugramm (2014). She has also forayed into tulu film industry with the blockbuster Chaali Polilu (2014). Rao has been a part of more than 100 Kannada films and many serial/soaps in Kannada.

== Career ==
Rao first began as an assistant to writer and director T. N. Narasimhan in the mid-1990s. It was then that she was "exposed... to all faculties of film-making — right from acting, handling a camera, up to working in the direction department. He was like an university for me." She also started out as an actress in his television serials such as Gorur Kathaloka, Ille Swarga, Katha Sangama and Sathilla. She was then introduced to popular serial director T. S. Nagabharana who worked with DD Chandana during the time. Rao hosted the show Bhagini on the network. She turned producer next and had Nagabharana direct a children-based talent show, Prachanda Pratibhegalu. Urged by him, she would go on to direct an eight-episode series Raja Maaja, a talk show based on gender equality and social justice titled Samarekhegalu and a 13-episode series Naayi Baala. She then made a reality singing show Sangeeta Sambhrama, which completed 68 episodes. However, Rao'spopularity grew when she compered another show Streeloka, besides acting in Mayamruga and Sadhane. She has also acted in Nagabharana's Joku Joke and as a mistress in O Nanna Belake.

In 2006, Rao made the teleserial Moodala Mane directed by Vaishali Kasaravalli which garnered popularity across Karnataka. This was followed by Preethi Illada Mele which had Achyuth Kumar, Anant Nag and Yash playing prominent roles.

Rao made her Kannada film debut as an actress with V.Ravichandran's Hatavadi (2006). She received recognition for her role in Mungaru Male wh released the same year. She was nominated for the Filmfare Award for Best Supporting Actress three times.

== Personal life ==
Padmaja Rao was born in Mysore. Her family shifted to Mumbai where she did her schooling. Growing up in Mumbai, she was fluent in Hindi and Marathi, apart from her mother-tongue Kannada and acted in play staged in these languages during her formative years. Rao's family settled in Bangalore when she was 15, where she completed her pre-university course.

Rao was first married at a young age, which resulted in a divorce. She had a son, Sanjeev from the first marriage. He is a herpetologist, conservationist and animal activist. Rao stated in an interview that the first marriage proved to be an "escape" for which let her pursue her passion of acting.

Rao then married Prakash, a software engineer.

== Selected filmography ==
- Hatavadi (2006)
- Mungaru Male (2006)
- Gunavantha (2007)
- Gaalipata (2008)
- Rocky (2008)
- Madesha (2008)
- Psycho (2008)
- Taj Mahal (2008)
- Circus (2009)
- Vayuputra (2009)
- Mylari (2010)
- Prithvi (2010)
- Pancharangi (2010)
- Sri Harikathe (2010)
- Krishnan Love Story (2010)
- Silence (2010)
- Vaare Vah (2010)
- Panchamrutha (2011)
- Aata (2011)
- Shiva (2012)
- Parijatha (2012)
- Varadhanayaka (2013)
- Bachchan (2013)
- Bahaddur (2014)
- Nam Duniya Nam Style (2014)
- Chaali Polilu (2014)
- Athi Aparoopa (2014)
- Brahma (2014)
- Typical Kailas (2014)
- Kwatle Satisha (2014)
- Daksha (2015)
- Ekka Saka (2015; Tulu)
- Vajrakaya (2015)
- Ring Road (2015)
- Muddu Manase (2015)
- Rocket (2015)
- Style King (2016)
- Jai Maruthi 800 (2016)
- Eradane Sala (2017)
- Chowka (2017)
- Kanaka (2018)
- Dalapathi (2018)
- Krishna Tulasi (2018)
- Orange (2018)
- Brahmachari (2019)
- Rustum (2019)
- Adyaksha in America (2019)
- Tom and Jerry (2021)
- Body God (2022)
- Petromax (2022)
- Ambuja (2023)...Padma
- Sidlingu 2 (2025)

== Television ==
- Gorur Kathaloka
- Ille Swarga
- Katha Sangama
- Sathilla
- Bhagini
- Prachanda Pratibhegalu
- Raja Maaja
- Samarekhegalu
- Naayi Baala
- Sangeeta Sambhrama
- Streeloka
- Mayamruga
- Sadhane
- Joku Joke
- O Nanna Belake
- Moodala Mane
- Spurthi
- Uthungada Haadiyalli
- Nannavalu
- Nannavaru
- Hosa Haadi
- Nidhi
- Benkiyalli Aralida Hoovu (Zee Kannada)
- Sama Rekhegalu
- Shikhara
- Aramane Gili
- Jothe Jotheyali
- Hoovi
- Bhagyalakshmi

=== Game shows ===
- Savalige Sai (Udaya TV)
- Thutha Mutha (Udaya TV)
- Krazy Couple (Zee Kannada)
- Paddus Kitchen (Kalki Kannada)

== Short films ==
- Chocolate (Kannada)
- Me too (English)
- Oofie (English)
- Ondu Giftina Kathe
