= Brahma (2014 film) =

2014 film by R. Chandru

- Theatrical release poster
- Directed by: R. Chandru
- Written by: R. Chandru
- Produced by: Manjunath Babu
- Starring: Upendra; Pranitha Subhash; Sara Sharmaa; Nassar; Shayaji Shinde
- Cinematography: Shekar Chandra
- Edited by: K. M. Prakash
- Music by: Gurukiran
- Production company: Mylari Enterprises
- Release date: 7 February 2014
- Running time: 149 minutes
- Country: India
- Language: Kannada
- Budget: ₹25 crore

Brahma is a 2014 Indian Kannada-language action drama film written and directed by R. Chandru, and produced by Manjunath Babu. The film stars Upendra playing dual roles though both the roles never appear together onscreen. It also stars Pranitha Subhash and Sara Sharma, while actors Nassar, Rahul Dev, and Shayaji Shinde play other prominent roles. The film, spanning four generations, from the 16th to the 21st century, features an original soundtrack album by Gurukiran.The film was dubbed into Telugu.

== Plot ==
Brahma is the son of Veera Brahma, a patriarch of the prestigious royal dynasty Raja Brahma, who runs away from home after witnessing his father's cruel atrocities against the poor people. Years later, Brahma who is a local Robin Hood, stealing from the rich to provide for the poor, sets his sights on stealing money from Veera Brahma. While trying to steal money and jewellery from the house, Brahma is caught by ACP Bhairav singh, where Brahma reveals about the reason behind the robberies. Brahma is taken to the court and finally receive prison term after Veera Brahma and the people request the court to not provide death penalty. Brahma is released 2 years later and is confronted by a lady, whom Brahma recognizes as the wife of a gangster named Rahul Dev, who was killed by Brahma earlier in Malaysia. However, the lady forgives Brahma after learning about his good deeds and leaves. After this, Brahma addresses to the press about doing good to others without expecting anything.

== Cast ==
- Upendra as Brahma / Upendra
- Pranitha Subhash as Pranitha
- Sara Sharmaa as Rahul Dev's wife
- Rangayana Raghu as Lucky Man
- Sadhu Kokila as Sadhu
- Anant Nag as Narayana Murthy
- Urvashi
- Nassar as Veer Bramha
- Shayaji Shinde as ACP Bhairav singh
- Rahul Dev as Rahul Dev
- Sumithra
- Bullet Prakash
- Kuri Prathap
- Suchendra Prasad
- John Kokkin
- Padmaja Rao
- Suresh Mangaluru

== Production ==
=== Development and casting ===
Director R. Chandru, who tasted success from his previous venture Charminar revealed his intention to direct his next venture on 1 April 2013. He announced that he is going to direct Upendra in a film titled Bramha – The Leaderand the shoot for the film will commence in the first week of May. He also announced that the venture would be a Kannada – Telugu bilingual project, and actors from the Kannada and Telugu film industries would be acting in Bramha. He then quickly roped in actors Nassar and Shayaji Shinde to play the pivotal roles.

For the female lead, director approached actress Trisha who turned down the offer citing personal reasons. Later actresses Deeksha Seth and Deepa Sannidhi were considered but could not finalize. Finally, actress Pranitha was signed in to play the role who immediately agreed upon hearing the script.

=== Filming ===
The principal photography of the film began on 15 May 2013 at the backdrop of the Bangalore Palace, and the audio recording launch began two days prior to this at the Gurukiran studios. After launching in Bangalore Palace and song recording inauguration in Gurukiran Studio, the film team went straight to Lalith Mahal Palace in Mysore for eight days shooting. After this schedule, the director and team are moving to the Bangkok portion of the shooting.

== Soundtrack ==
The music is composed by Gurukiran for Anand Audio company and lyrics are written by Kaviraj.

Track listing
No.	Title	Lyrics	Singer(s)	Length
1.	"Tunta Tunta"	Kaviraj	Shweta Mohan	05:10
2.	"Tingu Tingu"	Kaviraj	Nakash Aziz, Chaitra H. G.	03:45
3.	"Pesallagi Order Kotte"	Kaviraj	Gurukiran	05:16
4.	"Brahma"	hridaya shiva	Ranjith, Gurukiran	04:50

== Release ==
=== Critical reception ===
Brahma received positive reviews from the critics.

SandalwoodBoxOffice rated the film 3.75/5 and called it a brilliant entertainer with a good story, acting, and action. Shyam Prasad of Bangalore Mirror rated the film 3/5 saying "Shekar Chandru is at the top of his game. Be it the battle scenes of the 15th century or the car chase in Malaysia, and he makes it look great. Brahma aspires to be a film taken seriously. But in the end, it is just a commercial film." CineLoka rated the film 3.75/5 and called it a "Brilliant Entertainer".

Sandesh of One India rated the film 3/5 and said "The director is successful in showing Upendra in five shades. As Upendra is also an admired director among Kannadigas and others, there is a lot of expectations from the movie. Well, to be more accurate, director R Chandru has not disappointed Upendra's fans in the film." The Hans India rated the film 3/5 and said "The film spans four generations and costumes are definitely the talking point. If you are an Uppi fan, you will love this film which is a typical Upendra film which bears all the trademarks of the actor."

GS Kumar of The Times of India rated the film 3.5/5 and wrote "With complete grip over the lively script laced with witty dialogues, the director has narrated the story excellently keeping the interest alive till the end. Upendra rightly fits into the role and has done a neat job. Though Praneetha's role is limited, her expressions are impressive. Rangayana Raghu is sure to make you laugh with a brilliant performance. Suresh Mangalore and Nazar are graceful. Shekhar Chandra's cinematography is lovely. Music by Gurukiran has nothing much to offer."

Indiaglitz rated the film 7.5/10 saying, "Director R Chandru is scaling heights with big thoughts, big canvas and tremendous marketing skills to promote his product. He has made such a captivating, concern filled, chilling moments, close to heart at the end of the film 'Brahma' – surely a wholesome entertainer with ingredients well measured and transmitted on the silver screen."

=== Box office ===
Brahma took a grand opening at the box office by collecting a whopping ₹ 36 million on its first day in a record breaking 276 screens and 1076 shows all over Karnataka. Even though release in too many theaters limited the number of houseful screenings, the overall collection was huge. Brahma had a spectacular opening weekend and collected a total of ₹ 97.5 million in its opening weekend which is the highest weekend collection for a Kannada movie. The break-up, according to director R Chandru, is ₹ 36.5 million (Friday), ₹ 24 million (Saturday) and ₹ 37 million (Sunday). But collection gradually fades the following week, and It was declared a blockbuster by Box Office India as it ran for 50 days in 35 centres.
