= Kanaka (film) =

- Film poster
- Directed by: R. Chandru
- Written by: R. Chandru
- Story by: R. Chandru
- Based on: Veyil (2006)
- Produced by: R. Chandru
- Starring: Duniya Vijay; Hariprriya; Manvitha Harish
- Cinematography: Satya Hegde
- Edited by: K. M. Prakash
- Music by: Naveen Sajju
- Production company: RC Movies
- Distributed by: Sri Siddeshwara Enterprises
- Release date: January 26, 2018
- Running time: 158 minutes
- Language: Kannada

Kanaka is a 2018 Indian Kannada-language romantic action film written and directed by R. Chandru. It features Duniya Vijay, Hariprriya and Manvitha Harish in the lead roles along with P. Ravishankar, Rangayana Raghu and Sadhu Kokila in key supporting roles. The score and soundtrack for the film are by Naveen Sajju and the cinematography is by Satya Hegde. This movie is an unofficial remake of the Tamil film Veyil (2006).

The official teaser of the film was released on 1 November 2017 coinciding with the Kannada Rajyotsava festival. The film released on 26 January 2018.

== Cast ==
- Duniya Vijay as Kanaka
- Manvitha Harish as Kanasu
- Hariprriya as Sampige
- P. Ravishankar
- Dr Darshan Basavaraj as Kanaka's brother
- Sadhu Kokila
- Rangayana Raghu
- Achyuth Kumar
- Srinivasa Murthy
- Sudha
- Yuga Chandru
- Padmaja Rao
- Jaimin Panchal
- Naveen Sajju (special appearance in "Enne Namdu Oota Nimdu")

== Soundtrack ==
Kanaka

Soundtrack album by Naveen Sajju
- Genre: Feature film soundtrack
- Language: Kannada
- Label: Anand Audio
- Producer: Naveen Sajju

The film's background score and the soundtracks are composed by playback singer Naveen Sajju, making his debut in composition. The music rights were acquired by Anand Audio. The song Putta Putta Kannugalu was lifted from the Tamil song Unakenna Venum Sollu... from the movie Yennai Arindhaal and the beginning of the song Matte Matte Nenapu was lifted from the song Tamil song Paravaye Engu Irukiraai, from Kattradhu Thamizh

Tracklist
No.	Title	Lyrics	Singer(s)	Length
1.	"Duniyadalle Don"	Kaviraj	Kailash Kher
2.	"Modalasari"		Gowrav Hari
3.	"Yaara Badukinalli"		Ramya Behara
4.	"Matte Matte Nenapu"		Chethan Naik
5.	"Enne Namdu"	Naveen Sajju	Naveen Sajju
6.	"Putta Putta Kannugalu"		Chethan Naik
7.	"Bara Moda Karagi"		Naveen Sajju
8.	"Duniyadalle Don"		Naveen Sajju
