= Mylari =

- Film poster
- Directed by: R. Chandru
- Screenplay by: R. Chandru
- Story by: R. Chandru
- Produced by: K. P. Srikanth, Srinivas Kanakapura
- Starring: Shiva Rajkumar; Sadha; Sanjjana
- Cinematography: K. S. Chandrashekar
- Edited by: K. M. Prakash
- Music by: Gurukiran
- Production company: Company Enterprises
- Distributed by: R.S. Productions
- Release date: 24 December 2010
- Running time: 165 minutes
- Country: India
- Language: Kannada

Mylari (Kannada: ಮೈಲಾರಿ) is a 2010 Indian Kannada film that has Shiva Rajkumar and Sadha in the lead role. R. Chandru of Taj Mahal (movie) fame is the writer and director.

== Cast ==
- Shiva Rajkumar as Mylari
- Sadha as Anitha
- Sanjjana as Swathi
- Rangayana Raghu
- Ravi Kale as Jailer
- Bullet Prakash
- Kuri Prathap
- Lakshman Rao
- Madhugiri Prakash
- Gaurish Akki
- Mandya Jayaram
- Suresh Heblikar
- John Kokken
- Kote Prabhakar
- Dileep Kumar
- Umesh Punga
- Suchendra Prasad
- Suresh Mangalore
- Yashas Surya
- Vijaya Sarathi
- Guru Prasad
- Danny Kuttappa
- Vidya Murthy
- Rekha. V. Kumar
- Nihar K Chandra as younger Mylari
- Padmaja Rao

== Soundtrack ==
Mylari audio released by Anand Audio is set to create a record in the history of Kannada film music. It was first film in 2010 to sell 540 audio CDs and cassettes in the first two days of its release .

Track #	Song	Singer(s)	Lyricist
1	"Jagginakka Jagginakka"	Shankar Mahadevan	Kaviraj
2	"Sukumaari"	Udit Narayan, Shamita Malnad	Kaviraj
3	"Langa Daavani"	Gurukiran	Gurukiran
4	"Ghallu Ghallenutha"	S.P.B, Chitra	Kaviraj
5	"Butbide"	Kailash Kher	Manjunath Sanjeev
6	"Mylapura Mylari"	Puneeth Rajkumar, Shamita Malnad	Kaviraj

== Reception ==
=== Critical response ===
R G Vijayasarathy of Rediff.com scored the film at 3 out of 5 stars and says "This is definitely both Chandru's and Shivanna's 'sure shot' at erasing their past mistakes. All in all, Mylari is a good entertainer". A critic from The New Indian Express wrote "Meanwhile, the SP (Ravi Kale) of the area wants to know about Mylari. The movie is a worth watch for those who want to see the dancing skills of hattrick hero Shivaraj Kumar". A critic from The Times of India scored the film at 3.5 out of 5 stars and wrote "While Sada wins your heart with her excellent expressions and few dialogues, Sanjana shines in her lively and mischievous role. Suchendra Prasad rightly fits the role of a politician. K S Chandrashekar gives some brilliant cinematography". A critic from Bangalore Mirror wrote "The film has all the commercial trappings of a village-boy-caught-in-a-city story, which Shiva Rajkumar has made his own. The film is not in the same class as Jogi or Om, even though Puneeth croons in the title song that Mylari is not Jogi or Om's Sathya. Very true". B S Srivani from Deccan Herald wrote "Sada looks famished, Rangayana Raghu and Guruprasad irritate and Suchendra Prasad’s mumbling doesn’t help his essay of villainy. The others are hardly missed. Cinematography shines, while the same is not true of music. Shivanna fans will definitely love Mylari along with families of course".
