= Advaitha (film) =

2013 Indian Kannada-language film

- Official poster
- Directed by: BM Giriraj
- Produced by: NM Suresh
- Starring: Ajai Rao; Harshika Poonacha
- Cinematography: Kiran Sampapura
- Music by: Veer Samarth
- Release date: 6 December 2013
- Country: India
- Language: Kannada

Advaitha is a 2013 Indian Kannada-language suspense thriller film directed by BM Giriraj and starring Ajai Rao and Harshika Poonacha.

== Cast ==
- Ajai Rao as Vivek
- Harshika Poonacha as Ambika
- Achyuth Kumar as Harsha
- Neenasam Ashwath as Sudarshan

== Production ==
The film began production in early 2011. The shooting for the film was finished by May 2012. Rao was not paid for the film because of Suresh's financial situation after Excuse Me (2003). The film was Giriraj's first film but released after Jatta (2013).

== Release and reception ==
The film was released on 6 December 2013, the same day as B3 also starring Poonacha.

A critic from The Times of India said that "With poor script, confusing narration, bad editing that does not link sequences properly, too many characters, turns and twists, director Giriraj has reduced it to a cock and bull story". Shyam Prasad S of Bangalore Mirror said that "The biggest problem with this film is that the story isn’t believable".
