= Krishna Talkies =

Indian Kannada-language horror mystery thriller

- Directed by: Vijayanandha
- Written by: Sailesh
- Produced by: Govindaraju
- Starring: Ajay Rao; Sindhu Lokanath; Apoorva; Chikkanna
- Cinematography: Abhishek Kasargod
- Edited by: Srikanth
- Music by: Sridhar V. Sambhram
- Production company: Gokula Entertainers
- Release date: 16 April 2021
- Country: India
- Language: Kannada

Krishna Talkies (Kannada: ಕೃಷ್ಣ ಟಾಕೀಸ್) is a 2021 Indian Kannada-language mystery thriller film written and directed by Vijay Anand, produced by Govindaraju, with a music score by Sridhar V Sambram, and cinematography by Abhishek Kasargod it was released in India on 16 April 2021.

== Plot ==
In a single screen theater named Krishna Talkies where mystery on cine-goers with a balcony ticket bearing the number 13 poses as a series of threats with murders, death and accidents. Ajay, a journalist goes about unraveling the truth

== Cast ==
- Ajay Rao as Ajay
- Apoorva
- Sindhu Lokanath as Parimala
- Chikkanna as Suri
- Mandya Ramesh
- Shobaraj
- Pramod Shetty
- Yash Shetty
- Niranth A as Manoj
- Prakash Thuminad
- Lasya Nagaraj in special appearance

== Soundtrack ==
No.	Title	Singer(s)	Length
1.	"Nighty Maatra Haakobeda"	Naveen Sajju, Shashank Sheshagiri
2.	"Manamohana"	Anwesshaa, Vihan Aarya

== Reception ==
Reviewing Krishna Talkies for The Times of India, Sunayana Suresh gave three stars from five. Talkies makes for a decent watch, albeit there are some glaring glitches that need to be overlooked. For the New Indian Express, A.Sharadhaa gave three stars from five with praise for the Ajay Rao for his performance, writing about the director she states "Krishna Talkies is an interesting suspense thriller with an ample dose of horror. Director Vijay Anand, who has taken the responsibilities of the story, screenplay writing, dialogues and lyrics, shoulders the pressure to deliver an interesting film well."
