= Pranitha Subhash =

Indian actress (born 1992)

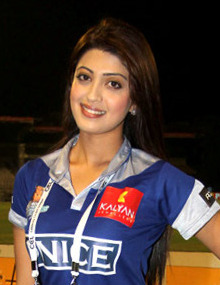
- Pranitha in 2015
- Born: Pranitha Subhash; 17 October 1992 (age 33); Bangalore, Karnataka, India
- Occupation: Actress
- Years active: 2010–present
- Spouse: Nitin Raju (m. 2021)
- Children: 2

Pranitha Subhash (born 17 October 1992) is an Indian actress who appears in Kannada, Telugu, Tamil, Hindi and Malayalam films. She debuted as an actress in the 2010 Kannada film, Porki. In 2012, she starred in Bheema Theeradalli and got a break through, and appeared in several commercially hits like Baava (2010), Attarintiki Daredi (2013), Masss (2015) and Hello Guru Prema Kosame (2018).

== Career ==
Pranitha debuted in the 2010 Kannada film Porki opposite Darshan. After the success of Porki, she refused several offers from Kannada films and became choosy about her projects before signing for the Telugu film Baava, a love story where she starred opposite Siddharth. She was praised unanimously for her portrayal of a Telugu village belle in the film. She then went on to appear in her first Tamil film, Udhayan, starring Arulnithi.

She was then signed up for her second Tamil project Saguni, opposite Karthi, which released in both Tamil and Telugu languages. Saguni was her biggest release: a film that released in a record 1,150 theatres all over the world.

She then appeared in Jarasandha and Bheema Theeradalli, a real-life story of a naxalite, both opposite Duniya Vijay. Pranitha was praised for her portrayal of Bheemavva by critics and won a Filmfare nomination for the same. She won the Santosham award that year for Bheema Theeradalli.

She then acted in the Kannada film Whistle, for which she earned a nomination at the SIIMA awards.

After this, she appeared in the Telugu language film Attarintiki Daredi, which was released in September 2013 and went on to become the highest grossing Telugu language film of all time, collecting over ₹100 crore. It also won her nominations at various award events. The film is being remade in other languages.

During the same time, she worked on a Kannada film Brahma, opposite Upendra. She also worked on Pandavulu Pandavulu Thummeda, starring Raveena Tandon and Mohan Babu, in which she was paired opposite Manchu Manoj. Both the films fared well. After a brief gap of two years, she signed for another Tamil film Masss, opposite Suriya in late November 2014. In late 2014, she acted in a Telugu film Dynamite, opposite Manchu Vishnu.

In late June 2015, she acted in the Telugu film Brahmotsavam, featuring Mahesh Babu.

She recently worked with Ayushmann Khurrana in the song "Chan Kitthan".

In December 2020, Pranitha completed her executive education and received a degree in Professional & Leadership Development from Harvard Kennedy School.

== Other work ==
=== Endorsements ===
Subhash endorsed brands like Joyalukkas, SVB Silks Salem, Bombay Jewellery, Welight Academy of Education, Sri Lakshmi Jewellery, Pondichery and RS Brothers. She was signed as the brand ambassador of the team Karnataka Bulldozers in the Celebrity Cricket League in its third season in 2013. In October 2014, Subhash along with Anu Prabhakar was selected as the ambassador for the Jewels of India – a fashion jewellery exhibition in Bangalore. Subhash was the brand ambassador of Jewels Exotica the following year. She was the face of GRB and Lulu mall among others.

=== Business ===
Subhash bought stakes in a hospitality company and now co-owns a restaurant called Bootlegger on Lavelle Road, Bangalore.

=== Philanthropy ===
Subhash has been involved in various philanthropic activities in India. She is working towards modernising public education in Karnataka by adopting schools and providing them with better infrastructure and sanitation facilities. Subhash and a group of volunteers refurbished an ageing school in Karnataka's Hassan district. She has been committed to the cause by bringing an overhaul in the infrastructure and introducing language teachers in the schools. Today, at least 13 such schools have been adopted by various individuals and has set a precedence to the others. She contributed US$10,000 to the same cause. In April 2019, the Election Commission (EC), along with Rahul Dravid, had appointed Subhash as a brand ambassador to promote awareness among general public on voting before the 2019 general election in India. The initiative was termed as "State Icons" and aimed to reach out to millions of voters in Karnataka. In 2018, Subhash was a part of the Young South Indian Leaders delegation, organised by the Ministry of Foreign Affairs of Israel.

== Personal life ==
Pranitha married businessman Nitin Raju in an intimate ceremony on 30 May 2021. In June 2022, she gave birth to a daughter. In September 2024, she gave birth to a son.

== Filmography ==
Key
†	Denotes films that have not yet been released

Year	Title	Role	Language	Notes	Ref.
2010	Porki	Anjali Iyer	Kannada		
2010	Em Pillo Em Pillado	Badra	Telugu		
2010	Baava	Varalakshmi	Telugu		
2011	Udhayan	Priya	Tamil		
2011	Jarasandha	Samantha	Kannada		
2012	Bheema Theeradalli	Bheemavva	Kannada		
2012	Saguni	Sridevi	Tamil		
2012	Snehitaru	Anjali	Kannada		
2012	Mr. 420	Rukmini	Kannada		
2013	Whistle	Anu	Kannada		
2013	Attarintiki Daredi	Prameela	Telugu		
2014	Pandavulu Pandavulu Thummeda	Kuchala Kumari "Kuku"	Telugu		
2014	Angaaraka	Priya	Kannada		
2014	Brahma	Pranitha	Kannada		
2014	Rabhasa	Bhagyam	Telugu		
2015	Masss	Anuradha Shakthivel	Tamil		
2015	Dynamite	Anamika	Telugu		
2015	A 2nd Hand Lover	Herself	Kannada		
2016	Brahmotsavam	Babu's cousin	Telugu		
2016	Jaggu Dada	Herself	Kannada	Cameo appearance	
2017	Enakku Vaaitha Adimaigal	Divya	Tamil		
2017	Gemini Ganeshanum Suruli Raajanum	Priya	Tamil		
2017	Mass Leader	Deepa	Kannada		
2018	Hello Guru Prema Kosame	Reethu	Telugu		
2019	N.T.R: Kathanayakudu	Krishna Kumari	Telugu	Cameo appearance	
2021	Hungama 2	Vani Kapoor	Hindi		
2021	Bhuj: The Pride of India	Usha Karnik	Hindi		
2024	Thankamani	Arpitha Nath IPS	Malayalam		
2024	Ramana Avatara	Seetha	Kannada		

== Awards and nominations ==
Film	Award	Category	Result	Ref
Bheema Theeradalli	60th Filmfare Awards South	Best Actress	Nominated	
Bheema Theeradalli	2nd SIIMA Awards	Best Actress	Nominated	
Whistle	3rd SIIMA Awards	Best Actress	Nominated	
Attarintiki Daredi	61st Filmfare Awards South	Best Supporting Actress – Telugu	Nominated	
Brahma	4th SIIMA Awards	Best Actress	Nominated	
Massu Engira Masilamani	9th Edison Awards	Best Supporting Actress	Won	
