= Shokiwala =

Kannada language film

- Directed by: Jocky
- Produced by: T. R. Chandrashekhar
- Starring: Ajay Rao; Sanjana Anand
- Cinematography: Naveen Kumaar S.
- Edited by: K. M. Prakash
- Music by: Shridar V. Sundaram
- Production company: Christmas Park Cinema
- Release date: 29 April 2022
- Country: India
- Language: Kannada

Shokiwala is a 2022 Kannada-language romantic action drama film directed by Jocky. It stars Ajay Rao, Sanjana Anand in the lead roles and Giri Shivanna, Sharat Lohitashwa, Tabala Nani, Pramod Shetty, Aruna Balraj and Lasya Nagraj in supporting roles.

== Plot ==
Ajay and Rachu are happily married couple. Ajay had seen Rachu while working with her father in their family nursery and fell in love with her. He comes to her home and talks to her father about the marriage proposal, for which her father happily agrees seeing Ajay's background. Ajay had to go to Mumbai for a business trip and is returning on the day before Rachu's birthday. As it's her first birthday after their marriage, he has planned romantic getaway to a resort in Mudigere.

His driver Kumar was supposed to pick him up at the airport, but both Rachu's and Kumar's phone are unreachable. After coming back home, he finds Kumar dead, murdered by his wife, seemingly due to self defence. He hatches a plan that instead of going to police, they will dispose the body and goes to resort as planned, so that no one doubts them.

They even go to driver's house and talk with his wife, so that his wife doesn't suspect them about her husband disappearance. With lot of hurdles they reach Chikmagalur, only to be blackmailed by an unknown caller for 25lakh rupees. Ajay somehow arranges the money and puts the money in drop location asked by the blackmailer. He drives away from the spot, only to go back and fight the blackmailer to know who he is. In the ensuing fight, blackmailer is killed, and Ajay takes his phone and belongings and they both escape from the spot.

Blackmailers death is soon found out about by the police and they start searching the murderer. Police realise that 2 cars had passed that location during the death and is announced in tv that both car owners would be investigated. Ajay realises that other car was owned by a local goon who is feared by police and locals. He stashes blackmailer phone, and the bag with money in goon's car and informs police with a mobile phone snatched from one of the goon's gang that, blackmailer was killed by the goon as part of some deal.

Police goes to goon's home to investigate, but is thrashed by goon and his gang. Ajay and Rachu reach their resort at night, celebrate her birthday and has planned to dispose the body early morning. police are informed that goon has escaped through foot, so police starts chasing him as well. When both Ajay and Rachu gets up early morning and opens the car trunk to dispose the body, the bag which contained the body has disappeared. Not wanting to be blackmailed again, Ajay tells that he will go to police and inform them that he killed his driver when he saw him attacking his wife. seeing how he is ready to sacrifice his life for her, Rachu starts telling the truth.

The blackmailer is none other than Rachu's boyfriend Varun before marriage. After she married Ajay he came back to her life, manipulated her to become his friend and on the day of the birthday tricks her to sleep with him. This is seem by the driver who in turns blackmails them for 10lakh. Seeing this Varun kills the driver and asks Rachchu to lie to his husband who will protect her due to his love for her. She carries on with the same plan.

But after seeing his husband's love for her, she can't hide it anymore and tells everything. Ajay says that he knew about Varun and her, after going through Varun's messages after he is killed in the fight, but also knows that it was Varun fault to have tricked Rachu and he happily forgives her and ready to move on. He had disposed the body in the late night without telling her, as he wanted to hear her confess about Varun.

Meanwhile, the police is tracking the goon who is still escaping on foot and is nearby Rachu and Ajay.The police fire his gun at the goon but misses him and hits Rachu. Rachu asks for forgiveness and asks him to marry a nice girl and dies in his arms. The camera pans out where we can see Ajay is still crying over his wife.

== Cast ==
- Ajay Rao as Krishna
- Sanjana Anand as Radha
- Giri Shivanna as Balu
- Hemanth Sushil as Siddha
- Sharat Lohitashwa as Narsimhe
- Tabala Nani as Linga
- Pramod Shetty as S. P. Prathap
- Aruna Balraj as Tayavva
- Lasya Nagraj as Mahadevamma

== Soundtrack ==
No.	Title	Lyrics	Length
1.	"Ninnannu Nodaliga"	Jayanth Kaikini	3:55
2.	"Naati Koli Neenu Naati Hunja Naanu"	V. Nagendra Prasad	3:48
3.	"Jeevana onethara cocktail"	Chetan Kumar; Shree Harsha	4:13

== Release ==
The film was released on 29 April 2022.

== Reception ==
It opened with mixed reviews from critics appreciating screenplay and performance of cast but was criticised for predictability and lack of strong script.
