= Prem Kahani (2009 film) =

- Promotional Poster
- Directed by: R. Chandru
- Written by: R. Chandru
- Produced by: G. Ravikumar; G. M. Vishwanath
- Starring: Ajay Rao; Sheela
- Cinematography: KS Chandrashekar
- Edited by: K. M. Prakash
- Music by: Ilayaraja
- Production company: Sri Lakshmi Balaji Productions
- Release date: 9 September 2009
- Country: India
- Language: Kannada

Prem Kahani is a 2009 Indian Kannada film directed by R. Chandru, starring Ajay Rao and Sheela. The film's music was composed by Illayaraja. The movie was released in September 2009.

== Plot ==
The story revolves around a slum dweller and a rich girl. We have seen plenty of disciplined parents, the slum dwellers being loved by rich girls, and vice versa. Just because the protagonist could not meet up with the desired lifestyle for, wife, and child. He stooped to the most unexpected move. The deeply hurt heroine spits on his corpse and walks out to make her son either Einstein or Sir M Vishveswaraya is the climax of this film. Hailing from a rich and disciplined family Sandhya instead of concentrating on studies falls to the roadside urchin Manja who ekes out his life from carrying loads from place to place. Flabbergasted with the move of Sandhya the days of Manja is fortunate enough the audience would feel. But Sandhya is forced to marry Rajesh a builder. On the very first night of her married life, Sandhya decides to either die or join Manja. The humble builder unites the lovers and walks out of their lives. On the other side Sandhya in the poor atmosphere cope up with everything and poverty becomes a part of her life. Manja hires an auto to earn his livelihood. That is not enough earning for Manja to keep his wife's child happy. The poor status continues for five years. Sandhya goes for a job in the computer center as a data entry operator. Sandhya is in shock and dismay on the day she receives her salary. What is that - you have to watch it on the screen.

== Cast ==
- Ajay Rao as Manja
- Sheela Kaur as Sandhya
- Rangayana Raghu as Sandhya's father
- Loknath
- Honnavalli Krishna
- Rajesh Nataranga as Rajesh
- Sudha Belawadi
- Kishori Ballal
- Mico Nagaraj
- Mohan Juneja
- Yathiraj
- Bullet Prakash

== Soundtrack ==
Song name	Singers
"Rangu Rangu"	Ilaiyaraaja, Shreya Ghoshal
"Yaarivanu Yaarivanu"	Sadhana Sargam
"Yaarivalu Yaarivalu"	Sriram Parthasarathy
"Badavara Manege"	Sadhana Sargam
"Shrungaara Bangaara"	Shreya Ghoshal
"Kogile Koogu Baa"	Bela Shende
"Giliya Mariyondu"	Ilaiyaraaja
"Hodadavanae"	Tippu, Rahul Nambiar
"Nannavale"	Rahul Nambiar

== Reception ==
=== Critical response ===
R G Vijayasarathy of Rediff.com scored the film at 2.5 out of 5 stars and says "Ajay is perfect as Manja. His body language and dialogue delivery are good. Sheela has come out with her best performance yet. All the other veteran artists have also performed with ease. All in all, Prem Kahani is worth watching". A critic from Bangalore Mirror was not impressed, writing: "dialogues and story. Sandhya’s longing for a poor lover is unconvincing. The second half of the film is exceptionally dragging and frustrates the viewer. The songs are light, but except for a couple of them, Ilayaraja disappoints. Spare the visit to the theatre".
