= Radheyaa =

Indian Kannada-language crime drama film

- Theatrical release poster
- Directed by: Vedaguru
- Screenplay by: Vedaguru
- Story by: Vedaguru
- Produced by: Vedaguru Murthy H S Priyanka S. R.
- Starring: Krishna Ajai Rao; Sonal Monteiro; Dhanya Balakrishna
- Cinematography: Rammy
- Edited by: Suresh Armugam
- Music by: Viyan S. A.
- Production company: Keerthi Chahna Cinema Karkhane
- Distributed by: NMK Cinemas
- Release date: 21 November 2025
- Running time: 121 minutes
- Country: India
- Language: Kannada

Radheyaa is a 2025 Indian Kannada-language crime drama film written, directed and produced by Vedaguru under the banner Keerthi Chahna Cinema Karkhaane. The film stars Krishna Ajai Rao, Sonal Monteiro, and Dhanya Balakrishna in lead roles, with Aravind Rao and Girish Shivanna in supporting roles. The film was released theatrically on 21 November 2025 to mixed reviews from critics. While the music of the film was composed by Viyan S. A., the cinematography and editing was by Rammy and Suresh Armugam respectively.

The film is psychological crime thriller that delves into the mind of a serial killer who confesses to multiple murders. The narrative explores themes of confession, morality, and the human cost of violence, presenting a slow-burning story anchored by a serial killer played by Krishna Ajai Rao.

== Plot summary ==
The film opens with Radheyaa’s troubled childhood, marked by neglect and abuse. As an adult, Radheyaa surrenders to the police, claiming responsibility for 36 murders (later revealed as 42), including his wife and unborn child. His confession is not for redemption but to have his story documented truthfully. Inside prison, he continues to kill notorious criminals, asserting his dominance even behind bars. Radheyaa seeks out Anupama Niranjan (Dhanya Balakrishna), a crime reporter, to narrate his life story. Through flashbacks, the film reveals his relationship with Amrutha (Sonal Monteiro), a crime journalist whose ambitions and shattered dreams intertwine with Radheyaa’s dark journey. The narrative oscillates between tense interrogations, psychological revelations, and chilling acts of violence, culminating in a plea for execution rather than mercy.

== Cast ==
- Krishna Ajai Rao as Radheyaa
- Sonal Monteiro as Amrutha
- Dhanya Balakrishna as Anupama Niranjan
- Aravind Rao as ACP
- Girish Shivanna
- Suraj Lokre as Kiran
- Bala Rajwadi in a cameo appearance
- Bhavani Prakash

== Production ==
=== Development ===
Director Vedaguru aimed to break away from conventional crime thrillers by focusing on psychological depth rather than sensationalism. The film was inspired by real-life criminal confessions and societal debates on capital punishment. Krishna Ajai Rao’s casting marked a significant shift from his romantic hero image to a grey-shaded, menacing character, which became a major talking point during production. Several prison sequences were shot in real correctional facilities in Karnataka for authenticity.

=== Filming ===
The film was shot across Bengaluru for urban sequences, Mandya and rural Karnataka for Radheyaa’s childhood flashbacks, and Hyderabad studios for controlled indoor scenes. Prison sequences were filmed in real correctional facilities in Karnataka for authenticity. Principal photography began in early 2024 and spanned about 90 days. Cinematographer Rammy adopted a gritty tone with muted palettes for crime scenes and warmer hues for emotional flashbacks. Stunt sequences were choreographed by Arjun Raj and filmed under strict safety protocols. Filming wrapped by mid-2024, followed by post-production work on editing and background score.

=== Marketing ===
Promotions included a teaser and trailer highlighting the intense psychological drama. Also, there were social media campaigns emphasizing the tagline: "Confession is not redemption." The distribution of the film for entire Karnataka was held by NMK Cinemas.

== Music ==
Radheyaa

Soundtrack album by Viyan S A
- Released: 2025
- Recorded: 2025
- Genre: Feature film soundtrack
- Language: Kannada
- Producer: Viyan S A

Composed by Viyan S A (alias Sandy Addanki), the soundtrack features dark, moody themes complementing the film’s psychological tone. The background score was praised for enhancing tension during confession and flashback sequences.

Track listing
No.	Title	Lyrics	Singer(s)	Length
1.	"Bhale Bhale"	Pramod Maravanthe	Viyaan S A	4:05
Total length:				4:05

== Critical reviews ==
The New Indian Express rated the film 3/5, calling it a "quietly unsettling slow-burn thriller" and praising Ajai Rao’s performance for its understated menace. Bangalore Mirror highlighted strong character development but noted minor plot inconsistencies regarding Radheyaa’s backstory. Critics lauded Vedaguru’s direction for maintaining suspense without resorting to excessive gore.
