= Vinmeengal =

2012 Indian film by Vignesh Menon

- Poster
- Directed by: Vignesh Menon
- Written by: Vignesh Menon
- Produced by: Maanas
- Starring: Rahul Ravindran; Vishva; Shikha; Anuja Iyer; Pandiarajan
- Cinematography: Anand Jeeva
- Edited by: G. Sasikumar
- Music by: Jubin
- Production company: Maanas Film Company
- Release date: 16 March 2012
- Running time: 2.35
- Country: India
- Language: Tamil

Vinmeengal (transl. Stars) is a 2012 Indian Tamil-language film written and directed by Vignesh Menon in his debut and produced by Maanas. The film stars Rahul Ravindran, Vishva, Shikha, Anuja Iyer, and Pandiarajan. It is based on a real-life incident revolving around the life of a physically-challenged protagonist. The music is composed by Jubin with cinematography by Anand Jeeva and editing handled by G. Sasikumar. The film was released on 16 March 2012.

== Cast ==
- Rahul Ravindran as Jeeva
- Vishva as Naren
- Shikha as Meera
- Anuja Iyer as Ila
- Pandiarajan as Panchu
- Anuradha
- Manibharathi
- Boys Rajan
- Velusami
- Master Krishna
- Master Siddharth
- Baby Sakshi

== Soundtrack ==
The soundtrack was composed by Jubin. All lyrics by Na. Muthukumar. The film had its audio launch held on 16 February 2012.

Track listing
No.	Title	Singer(s)	Length
1.	"Ariya Paruvathil"	Rahul Nambiar, Bombay Jayashri	5:29
2.	"Bhoomi Engum"	Bellie Raj	1:32
3.	"Kadhalum"	Ajesh, Karthika Nath	3:53
4.	"Nee Kattil"	Shankar Mahadevan	5:02
5.	"Un Paarvai"	Hariharan, Harini	6:00
6.	"Vazhi Maari"	Ajesh	1:51
Total length:			23:47

== Critical reception ==
The Times of India wrote "Vinmeengal, the debut effort of Vignesh Menon, showcases the potential within this budding filmmaker and the fresh cast, but in the end, you are likely to be left with mixed feelings. The director gives you an emotionally-charged story in the film's first half with characters that are immensely likeable, but criminally ignores them in the second half to deal with characters and events that aren't half as engaging". Behindwoods wrote "Vinmeengal is likely to work with the audience who would patronize serious and emotion laden films but not for consumers of commercial cinema". Sify wrote "On the whole, Vinmeengal is a clean and honest film with noble intentions and hats off to Vignesh". The New Indian Express wrote, "Inspirational and devoid of the usual commercial trappings, ‘Vinmeengal’ is promising work from a debutant filmmaker".
