= Filmfare Award for Best Lyricist – Kannada =

Indian annual film award

The Filmfare Award for Best Lyricist – Kannada is given by the Filmfare magazine as part of its annual Filmfare Awards for Kannada films.

== Superlatives ==
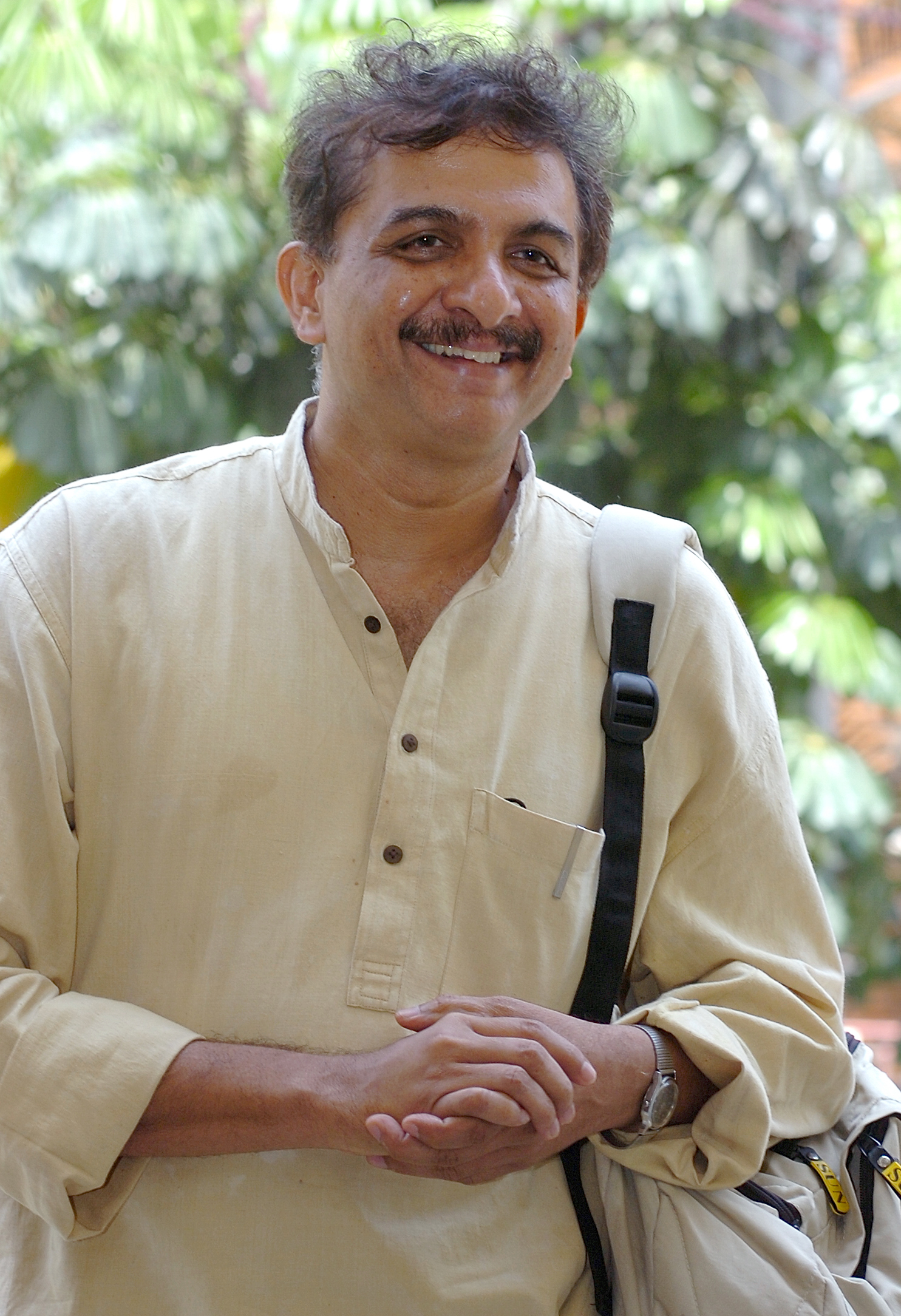
Jayanth Kaikini – has won the award a record five times.

Superlative	Lyricist	Record
Most award winner	Jayanth Kaikini	5 awards
Second most winner	V. Nagendra Prasad	4 awards

== Winners ==
Here is a list of the award winners and the songs and films for which they won.

Year	Lyricist	Song	Film	Ref
2024	V. Nagendra Prasad	"Dwapara"	Krishnam Pranaya Sakhi	
2023	B. R. Lakshman Rao	"Yava Chumbaka"	Chowka Bara	
2022	V. Nagendra Prasad	"Belakina Kavithe"	Banaras	
2020–21	Jayanth Kaikini	"Teladu Mugile"	Act 1978	
2019	AWARDS FUNCTION WAS SUSPENDED DUE TO COVID-19 PANDEMIC			
2018	H. S. Venkateshamurthy	"Sakkareya Paakadali"	Hasiru Ribbon	
2017	V. Nagendra Prasad	"Appa I Love You"	Chowka	
2016	Jayanth Kaikini	"Sariyagi Nenapide"	Mungaru Male 2	
2015	Jayanth Kaikini	"Nenape Nitya Mallige"	Kendasampige	
2014	V. Nagendra Prasad	"Kannalli"	Ambareesha	
2013	Siddu Kodipura	"Baanali Badalaago"	Simple Agi Ondh Love Story	
2012	Yogaraj Bhat	"Bombe Adsonu"	Drama	
2011	Kaviraj	"Sanju Mattu Geetha"	Sanju Weds Geetha	
2010	Kaviraj	"Gharane"	Aptharakshaka	
2009	Jayant Kaikini	"Ello Maleyaagideyandu"	Manasaare	
2008	Jayanth Kaikini	"Minchagi Neenu Baralu"	Gaalipata	
2007	V. Manohar	"Kannallu Neenene"	Pallakki	
2006	K. Kalyan	"Tananam Tananam"	Tananam Tananam	
