= Bhavana Rao =

Indian actress

Bhavvana Rao
- Born: Shimoga, Karnataka, India
- Other name: Shikha (Tamil stage name)
- Occupations: Actress, dancer
- Years active: 2008–present

Bhavvana Rao an Indian actress who has predominantly appeared in Kannada language films.

== Career ==
She made her debut in the Kannada multistarrer Gaalipata (2008) and gained immense popularity and winning critical acclaim for her performance, before playing leading roles in Kola Kolaya Mundhirika and Vinmeengal.

== Filmography ==
- All films are in Kannada language, unless otherwise noted

Key
†	Denotes films that have not yet been released

Year	Film	Role	Notes
2008	Gaalipata	Pavni	Nominated, Filmfare Award for Best Supporting Actress – Kannada
2010	Kola Kolaya Mundhirika	Veni	Tamil film
2012	Vaare Vah	Roopa	
2012	Vinmeengal	Meera	Tamil film
2012	Padam Parthu Kadhai Sol	Priya	Tamil film
2013	Attahasa	Chandini	
2013	Money Honey Shani	Kamakshi	
2014	Bahuparak	Herself	Special appearance
2016	Parapancha		
2017	Satya Harishchandra	Jayalakshmi	Won - SIIMA Award for Best Actor in a Supporting Role (Female)- Kannada
2017	Dayavittu Gamanisi		
2017	Tiger Galli		
2018	Raambo 2	Herself	Special Appearance in a song
2018	The Villain	Herself	Special Appearance in a song
2019	Bypass Road	Sonia	Hindi film
2022	Thurthu Nirgamana	Heroine	Cameo appearance
2022	Dharavi Bank	Deepa	MX Player
2023	Hondisi Bareyiri	Bhoomika	
2024	Grey Games	Kalpana	
2026	Landlord		
