= Psycho (2008 film) =

- Directed by: V. Devadattha
- Written by: V. Devadattha
- Produced by: R. Gurudatth
- Starring: Dhanush; Anita Bhat
- Cinematography: Sabha Kumar
- Edited by: B. S. Kemparaj
- Music by: Raghu Dixit
- Release date: 9 December 2008
- Running time: 120 minutes
- Country: India
- Language: Kannada

Psycho is a 2008 Kannada-language suspense thriller written and directed by V. Devadattha. The film stars Dhanush and Anita Bhat in lead roles. It was produced by R. Gurudatth under the banner 4D Creations. Raghu Dixit composed the music, marking his debut.

== Plot ==
A young man (Dhanush) lives in a decrepit old house. His spirits lift when he falls for a girl named Pavana (Anita Bhat). He stalks her everywhere she goes and has an odd habit of collecting the things she leaves behind, displaying them in a gallery in his house. However, he is unable to confess his love. This routine continues every day.

Pavana, an aspiring TV anchor, lives in a working women’s hostel. She finally lands a job as an anchor with a prestigious TV channel. One of her regular viewers, a devoted fan, follows her show religiously. During a live show, he manages to speak to her on-air, and she is intrigued by his sincerity. When she requests him to sing, she is deeply moved by the meaningfulness of the song.

Later, as Pavana returns to the hostel, two rogues harass her in public. The fan intervenes, beating them up and leaving them at the hostel entrance. The hostel officials, concerned about maintaining peace, force Pavana to move out. When the fan calls her afterward, she responds harshly, unaware of his identity.

Pavana moves in with her parents in their new home. During the housewarming ceremony, the fan calls her from a new number, introducing himself and congratulating her on her decision to live with her parents. She firmly asks him to only contact her during her show and not on her personal number.

One day, Pavana and her parents visit a vehicle showroom to purchase a new scooter. Though they make an advanced booking, they are told it will take a month and a half for delivery. To her surprise, the same scooter arrives at her home shortly after, along with a message from the fan: “You should get it as soon as you want it.” Pavana tries to call the number, but it’s unreachable.

The next day, the fan calls again to congratulate her on receiving the scooter. She tells him she’s not impressed by such gestures and asks him not to interfere in her personal life, before hanging up as she heads to work.

One night, he calls again, asking Pavana to meet him at Cubbon Park Road at 5 AM, saying he has something important to share. Intrigued, she shows up at the specified time, only to meet a priest who hands her a saree with sacred offerings in her mother’s name. When Pavana questions him, the priest informs her that it’s her mother’s birthday. Her mother is overjoyed by the gift, and Pavana thanks the fan for reminding her of her family responsibilities. She assures him that she will no longer feel annoyed by his calls.

One afternoon, Pavana’s father is hospitalized for a serious health issue. Her uncle, a doctor, helps stabilize him, and Pavana’s mother asks her to withdraw money to pay the bill. Due to an out-of-cash issue, Pavana must go to the main bank branch. When she returns to the hospital, she learns her father has already been discharged. She rushes home, only to find her parents safe and sound, escorted by the fan, who stepped in while she was overwhelmed. He calls again to check on her father’s health, and when she asks for his bank account number to repay the favor, she discovers it belongs to a charity for the blind and disabled. She is impressed by his humanitarian values.

Later, when the fan calls again, Pavana expresses suspicion about the unusual events happening in her life, suspecting he might be creating problems only to solve them. However, she also feels hopeful that he is a good person. He promises he will always keep his word and do anything for her. Over time, Pavana begins to fall in love with him.

One day, Pavana’s cousin visits, and when asked about her love life, Pavana describes the fan in her words, revealing that he uses different SIM cards for each call. She also mentions his unique poetry. Curious, her cousin suggests recording his voice. Pavana secretly saves a recording during their next conversation. Her cousin analyzes the recording, comparing it with a file on her father’s computer. Shockingly, the voices match, and it turns out the fan is a criminal who had murdered his own father. Pavana is heartbroken and falls unconscious after hearing this.

Pavana has a nightmare about the fan’s violent nature and wakes up to find her parents by her side. At that moment, the fan calls again, but she sternly warns him to stay out of her life and never contact her again.

Later, Pavana’s uncle, a psychiatrist, visits and scolds his daughter (Pavana’s cousin) for violating professional ethics. He explains that the fan had been under his care. The fan had lost his mother at a young age due to his father’s alcoholism, leading him to seek revenge and kill his father. The uncle had covered up the incident to protect the child’s future and admitted him for mental care. Knowing Pavana had inspired the fan to become a better person, he was nearing recovery, and only a few more counseling sessions would have cured him completely. Heartbroken by this revelation, Pavana rushes to the fan’s home, only to find he has taken his own life after believing he had lost her forever. The story ends tragically, with the fan’s death serving as a reminder of the consequences of misunderstandings, while leaving Pavana in sorrow over his transformation too late to save him.

The movie concludes with a poignant message about the complexities of love, mental health, and redemption.

== Cast ==
- Dhanush as a stalker
- Anita Bhat as Pavana
- Padmaja Rao as Sarla
- R. G. Vijayasarathy as Bobiyya
- Raghu Dixit (special appearance in the song "Ninna Poojege Bande Mahadeshwara")

== Music ==
Psycho

Soundtrack album
- Released: 5 January 2009
- Recorded: 2008

The film has six songs and an instrumental theme composed by Raghu Dixit. The album was released on January 5, 2009.

The music was critically praised and described as "a sensation in the Kannada film music industry". Rediff wrote, "What makes Psycho click with the audience is its unbelievable music. There is magic in Raghu's songs and also in the background score. The songs that rocked before the film's release are wonderfully picturised". IANS wrote, "Raghu Dixit has composed some unbelievable tunes in the film. Raghu has really brought out some freshness through his fusion music".

The music was also well received by the audiences.

Track listing
No.	Title	Lyrics	Singer(s)	Length
1.	"Mussanje Rangalli"	R. N. Jayagopal	Saindhavi	5:27
2.	"Psycho Theme"		Raghu Dixit	4:15
3.	"Preetiya Manashanthiya"	Jayanth Kaikini	Raghu Dixit	3:07
4.	"Beladingalate Minu Minuguta"	Jayanth Kaikini	Haricharan, Saindhavi	6:00
5.	"Ninna Poojege Bande Mahadeshwara"	V. Manohar,Raghu Dixit	Raghu Dixit, Haricharan	4:13
6.	"Ee Tanuve Ninnade"	Raghu Dixit,V. Devadattha	Raghu Dixit	5:10
7.	"Eno Ide"	Jayanth Kaikini	Raghu Dixit	5:42
Total length:				33:54

== Reception ==
=== Critical response ===
R G Vijayasarathy of Rediff.com scored the film at 3.5 out of 5 stars and wrote "But there are some minor aberrations too. For example, the characterisation of the hero and his uncle is little hazy. Plus, the suspense element jumps out of nowhere. It would have made more sense there was some kind of build up to the suspense. All in all, Psycho is a must see for all those who love suspense". A critic from Bangalore Mirror wrote "Dhanush’s identity is also well concealed through most parts of the film as he is made to wear a cap and shades. So, whatever facial expressions he has managed are also unknown. The others have managed a decent show. Cameraman Sabha Kumar and music composer and singer Raghu Dixit are the stars of this film. They put the much required zing into the whole affair. As an afterthought Psycho is worth the ticket price, but just about". A critic from Sify.com wrote "The two superb works have come from music director Raghu Dixit. All the songs are worth hearing again. Ninna Poojege Bandhe Mahadeshwara?., is the best among all. Sabhakumar camera work has been apt for the subject and he shows very good signs of good future".
