= Abhimann Roy =

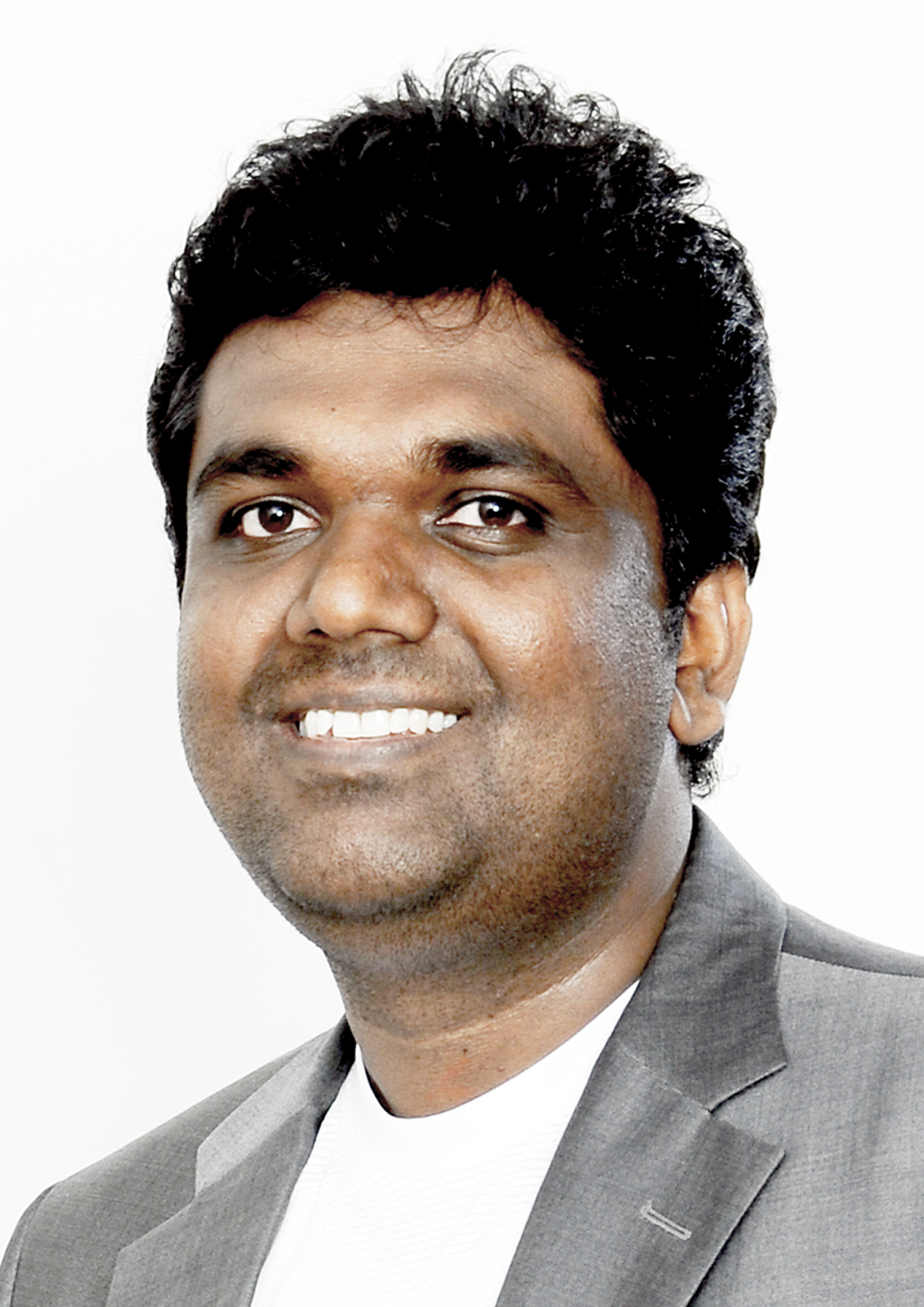

Background information
- Also known as: AR Melody Rockstar
- Born: 16 February 1979 (age 47); Bangalore
- Occupation: Music Composer/Singer/Lyricwriter
- Years active: 2001-present
- Website: abhimannroysmusicgalaxy.com

Abhimann Roy (Kannada: ಅಭಿಮಾನ್ ರಾಯ್) is an Indian film score and soundtrack composer. He has predominantly scored music for Kannada films. He has also sung few of his own compositions.

Roy debuted as a music composer in 2001 for the film Kullara loka and has since been composing for many commercial feature films in Kannada. Roy has won the Best Music Director Award from the Government of Karnataka for the year 2008-09 for the film, Taj Mahal.

== Discography ==
Year	Film title
2001	Kullara Loka
2003	Amasa
2004	Hendatiyobbalu Maneyolagiddare
2005	Dr. B. R. Ambedkar
2006	Poojari
2007	Bhakta
2007	Aa
2008	Taj Mahal
2009	Muniya
2009	Ravana
2010	Taj Mahal (Telugu)
2010	Gang Leader
2010	Huli
2011	Murali Meets Meera
2011	Swayamkrushi
2012	AK 56
2012	Bheema Theeradalli
2013	Ambara
2014	Karoodpathi
2016	Deal Raja
2018	Rugged
2018	Chanaksha
2018	Samartha
2019	Mane Maratakkide
2020	Big Salute To Our Police Tribute Video Song for Karnataka Police
2020	Namma Hudguru Kathe
2023	Kalyana Kuvara Dr. Channabasava Pattadavaru
