= Gaalipata =

- Theatrical release poster
- Directed by: Yogaraj Bhat
- Written by: Yogaraj Bhat
- Produced by: Suryaprakash Rao
- Starring: Ganesh; Anant Nag; Rajesh Krishnan; Diganth; Daisy Bopanna; Neethu; Bhavana Rao
- Cinematography: R. Rathnavelu
- Edited by: Suresh Urs
- Music by: V. Harikrishna
- Production company: SPR Entertainers (India) Pvt. Ltd.
- Release date: 18 January 2008
- Running time: 146 minutes
- Country: India
- Language: Kannada
- Budget: ₹4.5 crore
- Box office: ₹12 crore

Gaalipata ( transl. Kite) is a 2008 Indian Kannada-language romantic comedy drama film written and directed by Yogaraj Bhat. It features an ensemble cast consisting of Ganesh, Anant Nag, Rajesh Krishnan, Diganth, Daisy Bopanna, Neethu and Bhavana Rao. The plot revolves around three friends who, debilitated of city life, decide to spend some time in the paternal house of one of them, at a picturesque location atop a hill station. Spending a gala time there, they become romantically involved with the three daughters of an avid hunter.

The film was produced by Suryaprakash Rao of SPR Entertainment Pvt Ltd., and was made on a budget ₹60 million. The cinematography was done by R. Rathnavelu, and the film was edited by Suresh Urs. The film score and soundtrack were composed by V. Harikrishna. Gaalipata was the first in Kannada to be shot in Super 35 format.

The film was released on 18 January 2008 to critical acclaim, receiving praise for the screenplay, cinematography, and the performances of Nag, Neethu and Ganesh. Emerging as a commercial success, it completed a 175-day run. Upon receiving 11 nominations at the 56th Filmfare Awards South, it won three awards — Best Actor (Ganesh), Best Music Director (Harikrishna) and Best Lyricist (Jayant Kaikini).

== Plot ==
Three childhood friends — Ganesh, an MBA graduate; Diganth, a medical student; and Kitty, an engineer, are caught by police for drunk driving on a night in Bangalore. They use the influence of Ganesh's father, a legislator, to escape the consequences. To cheer up Kitty after a breakup with his girlfriend and to free themselves, the three arrive at the house of Diganth's grandfather in Mugilpete. Once there, they are introduced to and begin to stay at the guesthouse of Kodandaram, an avid hunter, the neighbor and friend of Diganth's grandfather. Kodandaram, now handicapped from a hunting accident and using a wheelchair, lives with his wife Padma, daughter-in-law Sowmya, and daughters Radha and Pavani.

Sowmya is widowed and teaches the village children; Radha, a student of Ayurveda, practices it. Ganesh, a foodie, is fascinated with learning about Kodandaram's hunting spoils and persuades him to join them in hunting the very wild boar that left his legs crippled two years ago. At the forest, Kodandaram accidentally shoots Diganth in the chest, but is saved by a gong he had worn around his neck. They embark on another and final venture to kill the boar. As the boar approaches a rifle-wielding and wheelchair-using Kodandaram, he gets up on his feet in an impulse and refuses to shoot it, thankful for bringing him back to his feet again, and calls it an incarnation of varaha. As days pass by, Diganth develops feeling towards Radha, who reciprocates, and Pavani towards Kitty, who falls in love with her as well.

Kodandaram and Padma approve of their relationship and decide to fix their wedding. Ganesh, in love with Sowmya, first tries confessing his feelings for her in writing, on a kite which on flying accidentally unstrings and flies away. Dejected, and eager to marry her, he speaks to her, and despite having developed a liking for him, she refuses. She decides to take up an offer for a job with an NGO in Switzerland and leaves for the nearest airport, and Ganesh accompanies her. Wishing to fly kites with the village kids across the river one last time, they use a coracle to cross it. Just as Sowmya confesses her feelings for him, the coracle capsizes as they encounter a rapid. Ganesh saves her from drowning, when she professes her love for him and she accepts him with a hug.

== Cast ==
- Ganesh as Ganesh / Gani
- Anant Nag as Kodandaram
- Rajesh Krishnan as Krishnan / Kitty
- Diganth as Diganth / Doodhpeda
- Daisy Bopanna as Sowmya
- Neethu as Radha
- Bhavana Rao as Pavani
- Rangayana Raghu as Byregowda, Ganesh's father
- Rajaram as Diganth's grandfather
- Padmaja Rao as Padma
- Sudha Belawadi as Ganesh's mother
- Dayal Padmanabhan as Dracula
- Ashwath Ninasam as Inspector
- Vanishree as Ganesh's sister (uncredited)

== Production ==
=== Development ===
Following the release of Mungaru Male in December 2006, Yogaraj Bhat began working on the story for his next film, in January 2007. The film was announced in early June 2007 with Suryaprakash Rao producing it.

=== Casting ===
Revealing that the story revolved around three parallel male leads, Bhat announced that Diganth and singer Rajesh Krishnan were signed as the two main leads. Diganth had appeared in Bhat's Mungaru Male in a cameo and Krishnan had till then appeared in only one Kannada film as an actor. Bhat then announced of having cast Puneeth Rajkumar to play the other lead on 6 June. Opposite the three male leads, actresses Daisy Bopanna, Neethu and Chaya Singh were signed. However, the role of Puneeth later went to Ganesh, at a time when Mungaru Male, his film with Bhat was still performing strongly at theatres, and his signing was confirmed on 16 June. Puneet and Bhat would later collaborate in 2011 for Paramathma. The next day, it was revealed that Chaya Singh was replaced by Bhavana Rao, who would make her debut with the film. It was also revealed that Anant Nag, H. G. Dattatreya, Rangayana Raghu, Sudha Belawadi, Padmaja Rao would be appearing in supporting roles, with R. Rathnavelu as the cinematographer and V. Harikrishna as the composer.

=== Filming ===
"In Gaalipata, we've shot on the highest peak of Kodachadri mountains, where there's zero visibility for most of the day. We also shot on the edge of the Shimsha falls and it was really freaky. The drop was quite steep and when we shot there, the search squads were in full swing looking for drowned tourists. But the effort has been worth it."

— Yogaraj Bhat, regarding the shoot of the film.

Despite the beginning of principal photography being scheduled for 22 June 2007, it began on 12 June. It took place at Sree Kanteerava Stadium in Bangalore, when a part of the film's title song was shot. Director N. Lingusamy clapped the first shot while actor Sudeep directed it. Speaking to the media on the film's plot, Bhat said, "It's about three youngsters, their angst and ambitions. They meet and fall for girls diametrically opposite in temperament and tastes." A budget of ₹60 million to ₹65 million and a total of 65 days was set for the project. It was revealed prior to filming that Bhat would receive a remuneration of ₹11.5 million, in addition to a bonus of ₹3.5 million if the film grosses ₹80 million. Ganesh was reportedly signed for an amount of ₹7 million. The first schedule was mainly filmed in the Shimoga region of Karnataka, in Thirthahalli, Agumbe and the mountains of Kodachadri. The sequence of the song "Nadheem Dheem Tana" was filmed in Kodachadri with 200 Yakshagana artistes as background dancers.

By early August, about 25 percent of the shoot was complete, following which certain sequences were filmed in Sakleshpur. A major portion of the shoot took place in the misty hills of Mandalapatti, at the forest limits of Pushpagiri, in the Coorg region of Karnataka. Sequences shot here and the surroundings of Ripponpete by the cloud-covered Kodachadri peak were shown in parallel in the film, under then name Mugilpet, which in Kannada translates to "the town of clouds". Other places of filming included Bangalore, Kasargod, Kalasa, Melukote and Gopalaswamy Hills. The entire filming was done in Super 35 format, a first for Kannada-language films. For sequences of the wild boar, a real-life boar was used in addition to the use of visual effects and rotoscoping. The visual effects work of total time of 2 minutes and 40 seconds of sequences featuring the boar cost around ₹750,000. Digital intermediate was used for digitizing and color manipulation of the film. The climax featuring Ganesh and Daisy Bopanna rowing a coracle was filmed in Shivanasamudra Falls in Mandya. The third and final schedule of shoot wrapped up in late August 2007. The production and the post-production work totaled to ₹70 million.

== Soundtrack ==
Gaalipata

Soundtrack album by V. Harikrishna
- Released: 16 December 2007
- Recorded: 2007
- Genre: Feature film soundtrack
- Length: 26:16
- Language: Kannada
- Label: Ashwini Audio
- Director: V. Harikrishna

V. Harikrishna chronology
Gaja (2008)	Gaalipata (2008)	Indra (2008)

V. Harikrishna scored the film's background music and composed its soundtrack, lyrics for which was penned by Jayant Kaikini, Yogaraj Bhat and Hrudaya Shiva. The soundtrack album consists of six tracks. It was released in Bangalore on 16 December 2007 in the form of audio cassettes and compact discs, both of which were then distributed to buyers attached to a kite, symbolic to the title of the film. Invitees included film producers and directors V. Ravichandran, Duniya Soori, Rockline Venkatesh and E. Krishnappa. Ashwini Music of Ashwini Media distributed the audio into the market.

Track listing
No.	Title	Lyrics	Singer(s)	Length
1.	"Ahah Ee Bedurugombeye"	Jayant Kaikini	Udit Narayan, Anuradha Sriram	4:07
2.	"Akasha Ishte Yaakideyo"	Jayant Kaikini	Tippu, Kunal Ganjawala	3:48
3.	"Kavithe Kavithe"	Hrudaya Shiva	Vijay Prakash	4:22
4.	"Minchagi Neenu"	Jayant Kaikini	Sonu Nigam	4:31
5.	"Nadheem Dheem Tana"	Yogaraj Bhat	K. S. Chithra	4:56
6.	"Onde Samane"	Yogaraj Bhat	Sonu Nigam	4:36
Total length:				26:16

=== Reception ===
The reviewer for Gandhadagudi.com called the soundtrack album of Gaalipata, one with "extraordinary lyric[s]". He called the song "Minchagi Neenu" followed by "Nadheem Dheem tana" the songs of the album. Rediff wrote, "Harikrishna's music composition adds a lot of pep to the film. Minchaagi Neenu Baralu (lyrics by Jayanth Kaikini) rendered by Sonu Nigam and Thadeem Dheem Thana by Chithra deserve special mention for good composition..." The album emerged as a massive success following it release and was called by Rediff.com as "one of the most successful albums". By the time the film released on 18 January 2008, the album emerged as a massive success with "chartbuster" tracks.

== Release and reception ==
Gaalipata was released on 18 January 2008 in over 300 theatres across Karnataka and in Chennai, Hyderabad, Mumbai and Pune. K. C. N. Chandrasekhar and H. D. Gangaraj, both of whom had then previously served as presidents of Karnataka Film Chamber of Commerce (KFCC) distributed the film on commission basis. The DVD of the film with 5.1 surround sound was distributed by Anand Video.

=== Critical response ===
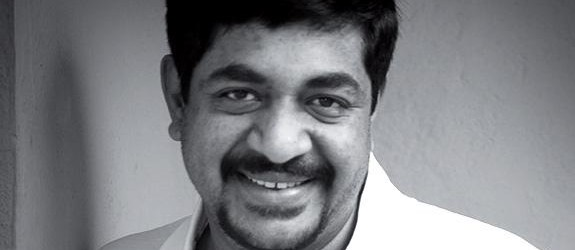
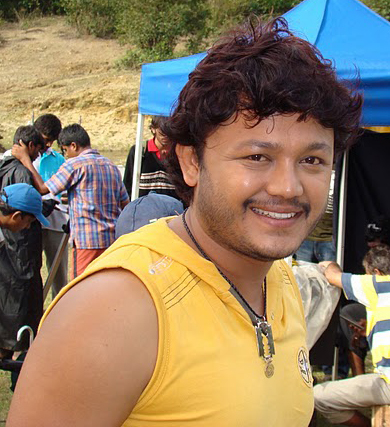
Yogaraj Bhat's (top) direction and Ganesh's (bottom) performance received praise.

Reviewing the film for Deccan Herald, Nrupathunga S. K. called it a "visual treat" and wrote, "The awesome locations, beautiful camera work, good screen play and superb performance by the lead actors make it to the list of good films. The director has once again shown that even a simple story can be presented well, provided that the movie excels in the above departments." Crediting the role of every department in the film, he highlighted those of Ganesh and the cinematographer R. Rathnavelu. R. G. Vijayasarathy of Rediff called it "a class act" and wrote, "Bhat has unleashed his best writing and narrating talents in this delightfully original and slickly presented entertainer which is witty, pretty and emotional." Especially praising Ganesh's performance, he further added, "Nature's beauty is artistically captured by cameraman Randy aka Rathnavelu. Award winning technicians like editor Suresh Urs and art director Shashidhar Adapa have effectively performed their tasks too." Writing for The Times of India, G. S. Kumar wrote, "This is a masterpiece by director Yogaraj Bhat after the success of his earlier film Mungaru Male. This romantic story is more serious. The script has been brilliantly handled and the narration is excellent." Applauding the performance of each of the lead actors, he concluded, "...it is Rathnavelu who walks away with all honours for his brilliant handling of the camera."

Chitraloka stated, "The feverish pitch that was seen around the state before the release of the film has been finally answered with a brilliant presentation by director Yogaraj Bhat who makes if look that writing film scripts is so easy. It is the writer in Yogaraj Bhat who comes off with flying colours again and his eagerness to go offbeat in narration is certain to lease a large number of audience who seek a big quota of freshness in the film." The reviewer acclaimed the role of the technical department and called it "a complete film". The reviewer for Indiaglitz called the film "[t]echnically this is a superb cinema", called some of the dialogues "carelessly written", and opined, "Yogaraj Bhat once again bank on Ganesh stardom and gives back seat to all others in the film. Sketching each character with different outlook Bhat has forgotten to write a good story for the film. The flow of developments set with beautiful backdrop and tolerable artistes handling the roles makes this film worth watching." Sify in its review echoed his view on the dialogues, yet rated the film positively calling it a film with "various fabulous elements". The reviewer commended the performance on all actors highlighting those of Ganesh and Neethu. He further wrote, "Yogaraj Bhat picks the similar locations with most dangerous water falls like Shivanasamudra, Kodachadri and exquisite mountains ranges of Karnataka. The technical excellence like Super 35, Digital Intermediate done for the film enhances the quality of the film."

=== Box office ===
The film had a slow start upon theatrical release. The first week net share of Gaalipata was ₹1.5 crores all over Karnataka. Collections picked up gradually, collecting a share of ₹25 million (US$270,000) in its first week. Following good response from the audiences, fares were increased by ₹5 to ₹20 per ticket in some theatres. It was later revealed that the distributors had the fares increased with the film doing well, unlike the hitherto trend that began with the 1999 Kannada film A.K.47, when producers had it done. It continued to perform well and collected around ₹200 million (US$2.1 million) as it approached its 100th day. Following public demand, the film began to be screened at more centers replacing the Hindi film Jodhaa Akbar. With Karnataka being the major market for Kannada films, the film continued to do well even as Bindaas, which released in February 2008, failed to perform. Gaalipata completed a 175-day run at a center in Bangalore on 8 June.

== Accolades ==
Award	Date of ceremony	Category	Recipient(s) and nominee(s)	Result	Ref(s)
South Filmfare Awards	31 July 2009	Best Film	Suryaprakash Rao	Nominated	
South Filmfare Awards	31 July 2009	Best Director	Yogaraj Bhat	Nominated	
South Filmfare Awards	31 July 2009	Best Actor	Ganesh	Won	
South Filmfare Awards	31 July 2009	Best Actress	Daisy Bopanna	Nominated	
South Filmfare Awards	31 July 2009	Best Supporting Actor	Diganth	Nominated	
South Filmfare Awards	31 July 2009	Best Supporting Actor	Rajesh Krishnan	Nominated	
South Filmfare Awards	31 July 2009	Best Supporting Actress	Neethu	Nominated	
South Filmfare Awards	31 July 2009	Best Supporting Actress	Bhavana Rao	Nominated	
South Filmfare Awards	31 July 2009	Best Music Director	V. Harikrishna	Won	
South Filmfare Awards	31 July 2009	Best Female Playback Singer	K. S. Chithra (for song "Nadheem Dheem Tana")	Nominated	
South Filmfare Awards	31 July 2009	Best Lyricist	Jayant Kaikini (for song "Minchaagi Neenu Baralu")	Won	
South Scope Style Awards	25 October 2009	Best Stylish Film	Suryaprakash Rao	Won	

== Sequel ==
Gaalipata 2 is a 2022 Indian Kannada-language romantic comedy film written and directed by Yogaraj Bhat. Despite the title, Gaalipata 2 is not a sequel to this film and is a namesake sequel. It features an ensemble cast consisting of Ganesh, Diganth, Pawan Kumar, Anant Nag, Vaibhavi Shandilya, Samyuktha, and Sharmiela Mandre.

== Legacy ==
The success of Gaalipata turned Ganesh into one of the most sought-after actors in Kannada cinema. He was already coming on the back of major commercial successes Mungaru Male (2006), Cheluvina Chittara (2007), and moderate successes Hudugaata (2007) and Krishna (2007). Yogaraj Bhat had delivered his two consecutive films that emerged as massive commercial successes, the other being Mungaru Male. Ganesh was seen in the film wearing a chain around the neck with a razor blade as the pendant. It became a trend among male fans. The film also proved to as a major break for Diganth who would go on to collaborate with Bhat frequently — Manasaare (2009), Pancharangi (2010) and Parapancha (2015). The nickname 'Doodh Peda' (an Indian sweet), by which Ganesh addresses to him as, in the film, came to be attached with his name in the media along with a tag of 'Chocolate Hero'. The film also proved to be a launchpad in the careers of actresses Neethu and Bhavana Rao.

The success of the film's soundtrack, especially the track "Minchagi Neenu Baralu" sung by Sonu Nigam, further propelled his playback singing career in Kannada cinema, who was already a "singer-in-demand" following the massive success of Mungaru Male's soundtrack. It also contributed to the film's success in a major way. With the song, lyricist and writer Jayant Kaikini's reputation as a writer of romantic songs further elevated, and is considered one of his best. A film with the same title was released in 2015, also starring Diganth as the male lead.
