= Ajay Rao =

Indian actor (born 1980)

- Born: 24 January 1980 (age 46); Hospet, Vijayanagar District, Karnataka, India
- Occupations: Actor, Producer
- Years active: 2003 - Present
- Organization(s): Sri Krishna Arts and Creations
- Spouse: Sapna Rao (m. 2014; div. 2025)
- Children: 1

Ajay Rao (born 24 January 1980), also credited as Krishna Ajai Rao , is an Indian actor and film producer who works primarily in the Kannada film industry. He made his acting debut in Prem’s romantic drama Excuse Me (2003), which became a hit, with a theatrical run for more than 25 weeks. His natural charm and relatable screen presence earned him instant recognition as a promising romantic hero.

Ajay rose to prominence with R. Chandru’s Taj Mahal (2008), followed by critically acclaimed performances in Krishnan Love Story (2010) and Krishnan Marriage Story (2011), both directed by Shashank. These films established him as one of the leading actors in Kannada cinema. In 2015, Ajay ventured into production with Krishna Leela, under his banner Sri Krishna Arts and Creations, which won the Karnataka State Film Award for Best Film and earned him widespread praise for his performance.

Over a career spanning more than two decades, Ajay has appeared in over 30 films, earning multiple Filmfare nominations for Best Actor – Kannada for Taj Mahal and Krishnan Love Story. Known for his versatility, he has successfully transitioned from romantic dramas to action thrillers and family entertainers, maintaining a consistent presence in Kannada cinema.

== Early life ==
Ajay was born on 24 January 1980 in Hospet, Ballari district, Karnataka, India, into a traditional Kannada-speaking family. His father is Mysore Lokesh, and his mother is Shobha Rao. He grew up in Hospet and completed his schooling locally before graduating from Vijayanagara College, Hospet, with a bachelor’s degree.

Ajay developed an interest in performing arts during his college years, actively participating in cultural programs and stage plays. Before entering films, he appeared in regional television serials and stage dramas, which helped him hone his acting skills and gain visibility in the Kannada entertainment industry. These early experiences laid the foundation for his film career, where he would later become known as “Sandalwood Krishna” for his romantic roles and natural screen presence.

== Career ==
=== 2003-2007: Breakthrough and struggle ===
Ajay made his debut as a lead actor in Prem’s romantic drama Excuse Me, co-starring Ramya and Sunil Raoh. The film was a blockbuster, running for 25 weeks at a Bengaluru’s theatre.

After his debut success, Ajay appeared in films like Surya the Great (2005), Green Signal (2005), and O Priyathama (2006), directed by newcomers. These films failed commercially. He continued with Amrutha Vaani (2007) and Hetthare Hennanne Herabeku (2007), which also underperformed.

=== 2008-2015: Resurgence and success ===
Ajay bounced back with R. Chandru’s romantic drama Taj Mahal, opposite Pooja Gandhi and veteran Ananth Nag. The film was a major hit, and critics lauded Ajay’s emotional portrayal of a lover torn by circumstances. He earned a Filmfare nomination for Best Actor – Kannada, cementing his status as a leading star. He, then played back-to-back romantic hero roles in Jaaji Mallige (2009) and Prem Kahani (2009) which emerged as average hits.

This was followed by two career-defining hits: Krishnan Love Story (2010), directed by Shashank, opposite Radhika Pandit and Krishnan Marriage Story (2011), with Nidhi Subbaiah. He earned another Filmfare nomination and continued his streak of romantic successes.

=== 2012–2018: Mixed success ===
Ajay experimented with genres in films like Breaking News directed by Nagathihalli Chandrashekar (2012) and Advaitha (2013). In 2014, he appeared in Rose and Jai Bajarangabali, credited as Krishna Ajai Rao, alongside Shravya and Sindhu. Critics noted his consistent screen presence even in uneven scripts.

In 2015, Ajay delivered one of his biggest hits with Krishna Leela, directed by Shashank, opposite Mayuri Kyatari. The film earned him another Filmfare nomination and marked his debut as a producer under Shree Krishna Arts and Creations. He also appeared in Endendigu and A 2nd Hand Lover the same year.

Ajay transitioned into action and family dramas with films like Krishna-Rukku (2016) – a romantic drama with Amulya, John Jani Janardhan (2016) – a multi-starrer comedy, Dhairyam (2017) and Krishna s/o CM (2017) – both political thrillers, Thayige Thakka Maga (2018) – an action drama.

=== 2019–present: Mature roles ===
Ajay explored suspense and emotional narratives in films such as Krishna Talkies (2021) – a mystery thriller, praised for its gripping tone, Love You Rachchu (2021) – a romantic drama with Rachita Ram and Shokiwala (2022) – a family entertainer.

After a hiatus of three years, Ajay appeared in Yuddhakaanda Chapter 2 and Radheyaa in 2025, showcasing his adaptability in intense roles.

== Personal life ==
Ajay Rao married Sapna on 18 December 2014 in a private ceremony held in Hosapete, Karnataka, attended by close family and friends. The couple had been in a long-term relationship before tying the knot. They welcomed their daughter, Cherishma, in 2019.

In August 2025, reports surfaced that Sapna had filed for divorce after more than a decade of marriage, citing marital discord and financial stress. She also lodged a complaint under Section 12 of the Domestic Violence Act, naming both herself and their daughter in the filing. Media reports suggested that Ajay’s financial losses from his production ventures, particularly the film Yuddhakaanda Chapter 2, contributed to tensions in the marriage. Ajay publicly requested privacy during this period, stating, “Every family goes through challenges, and it is our humble request that these remain private.”

== Filmography ==
Key
†	Denotes films that have not yet been released

Year	Title	Role	Notes	Ref.
2003	Kiccha	Kiccha's friend		
2003	Excuse Me	Ajay		
2005	Surya The Great	Surya		
2005	Green Signal	Indra		
2006	O Priyathama	Chinnu / Yashas		
2007	Amrutha Vaani	Samarth		
2007	Hetthare Hennanne Herabeku		Guest appearance	
2007	Ganesha	Shivu		
2008	Huttidare Kannada Nadalli Huttabeku			
2008	Taj Mahal	Ajay Kumar	Nominated—Filmfare Award for Best Actor – Kannada	
2009	Jaaji Mallige	Ramu		
2009	Prem Kahani	Manja		
2010	Krishnan Love Story	Krishna	Nominated—Filmfare Award for Best Actor – Kannada	
2011	Manasina Maathu	Ajay		
2011	Krishnan Marriage Story	Krishna	Nominated — Filmfare Award for Best Actor Kannada	
2012	Breaking News	Arjun		
2013	Advaitha	Vivek		
2014	Manada Mareyalli	Himself	Special appearance	
2014	Rose	Ajay	Credited as Krishna Ajai Rao	
2014	Jai Bajarangabali	Ajju / Ajay	Credited as Krishna Ajai Rao	
2015	Krishna-Leela	Krishna	Also producer Nominated—Filmfare Award for Best Actor – Kannada	
2015	Endendigu	Krishna		
2015	A 2nd Hand Lover	Ajai		
2015	Maamu Tea Angadi	Himself	Special appearance Also playback singer	
2016	Krishna-Rukku	Krishna		
2016	John Jani Janardhan	Janardhan		
2017	Dhairyam	Ajay Krishna		
2017	Krishna s/o CM	Krishna		
2018	Thayige Thakka Maga	Mohandas		
2021	Krishna Talkies	Krishna		
2021	Love You Rachchu	Ajay		
2022	Shokiwala	Krishna		
2022	Dilpasand	Preetham	Cameo appearance	
2025	Yuddhakaanda Chapter 2	Bharath		
2025	Radheyaa	Radheyaa		
2026	Sarala Subbarao	Subbarao	Credited as Krishna Ajai Rao	
2026	Partner [†]			
