= R. Chandru =

Indian film writer, director and producer

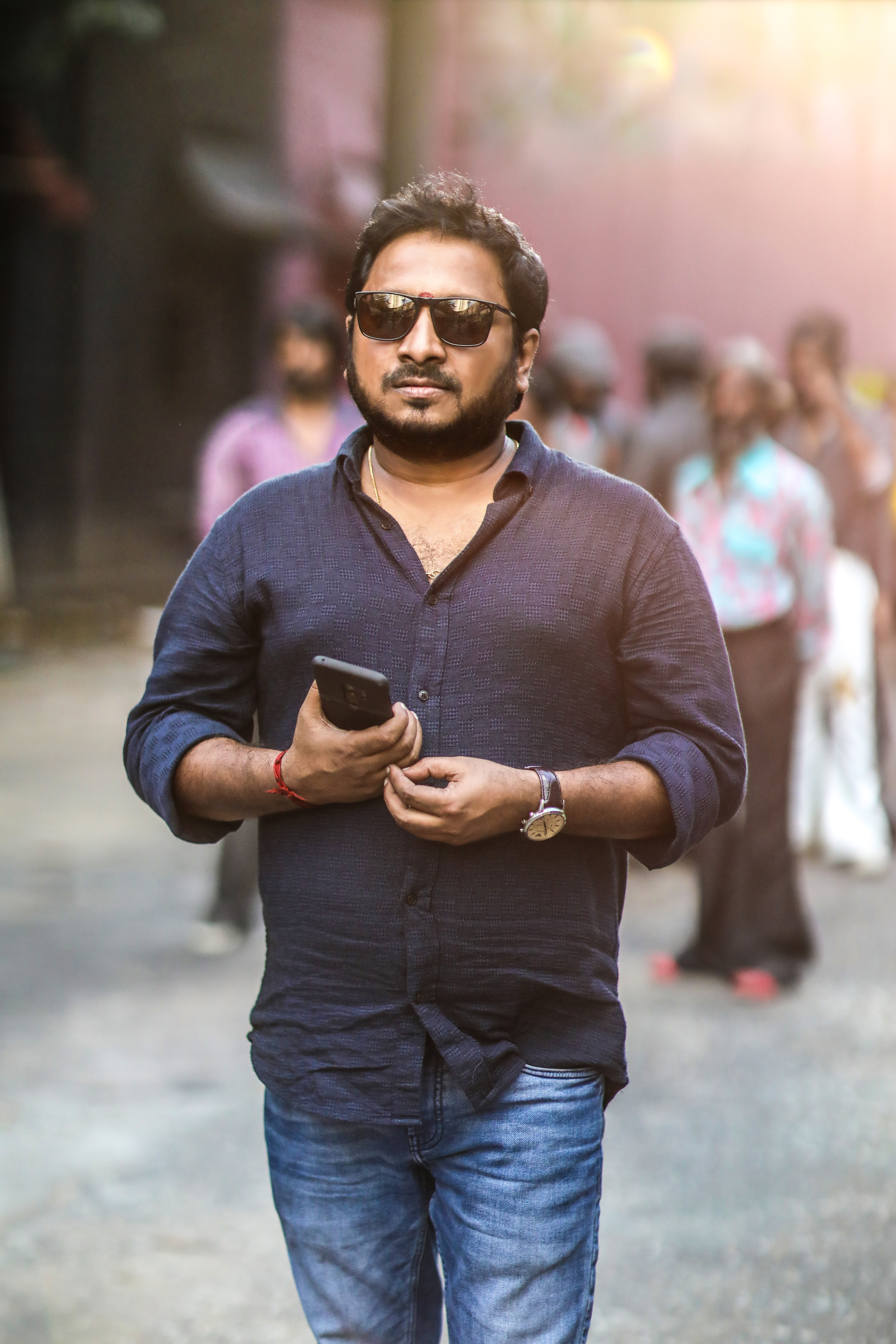
- Occupations: Film director; writer; film producer
- Years active: 2007–present

Mylari Ramiah Chandrashekar, known by his stage name R. Chandru, is an Indian film director, screenwriter and producer who works primarily in Kannada cinema. He is best known for romantic dramas Taj Mahal (2008), Mylari (2010) and Charminar (2013).

== Early life and career ==
Chandru started his film career as an assistant to director S. Narayan while working in the TV show Bhageerathi. In the year 2008, Chandru made his debut as a director and writer in the Taj Mahal starring Ajay Rao and Pooja Gandhi. Followed by 2009 movie Prem Kahani. In the year 2010 he directed the blockbuster film Mylari starring Shivrajkumar and Sadha. Likewise he directed and produced Charminar in the year 2013.

After achieving considerable success in the industry, Chandru has opened the production company Sri Sideshwara enterprises. In 2023, Chandru directed the period epic Kabzaa, about an air force pilot who becomes a gangster in 1971. The film was made with the budget of over 100 crores.

== Filmography ==
Key
†	Denotes films that have not yet been released

Year	Title	Director	Writer	Producer	Notes	Ref.
2008	Taj Mahal	Yes	Yes	No		
2009	Prem Kahaani	Yes	Yes	No		
2010	Mylari	Yes	Yes	No		
2012	Ko Ko	Yes	Yes	No		
2013	Charminar	Yes	Yes	Yes	Karnataka State Film Award for Best Family Entertainer	
2014	Brahma	Yes	Yes	No		
2015	Krishnamma Kalipindi Iddarini	Yes	Yes	No	Telugu film	
2015	Male	No	Yes	Yes		
2016	Lakshmana	Yes	Screenplay	No		
2018	Kanaka	Yes	Yes	Yes		
2019	I Love You	Yes	Yes	Yes		
2023	Kabzaa	Yes	Yes	Yes		
2026	Father †	No	No	Yes		
