= College Kumar =

College Kumar may refer to:

- College Kumar (2017 film), an Indian Kannada-language romantic comedy film
- College Kumar (2020 film), an Indian comedy film
