= Father's Day (disambiguation) =

Father's Day is a secular holiday celebrating fatherhood.

Father's Day may also refer to:

== Celebrations ==
- Father's Day (United States), the holiday as observed in the US
- Saint Joseph's Day, a Catholic feast day observed as Father's Day in some countries

== Film ==
- Father's Day, a 2011 Australian short film on which the 2017 feature West of Sunshine is based
- Father's Day (1930 film), or The Sins of the Children, an American film by Sam Wood
- Father's Day (1955 film), a West German comedy film directed by Hans Richter
- Father's Day (1996 film), a German comedy by Sherry Hormann
- Fathers' Day (1997 film), an American comedy by Ivan Reitman
- Father's Day (2011 film), an American-Canadian action-horror comedy film
- Father's Day (2012 film), an Indian Malayalam-language film
- Father's Day (2026 film), an Indian Kannada-language film
- "Father's Day" (Creepshow), a story segment of the 1982 film Creepshow

== Literature ==
- Father's Day (novel), a 1971 novel by William Goldman
- Father's Day, a 1981 novel by Eugene Kennedy
- "Father's Day", a 1985 story in the 2006 comics collection DC Universe: The Stories of Alan Moore

== Music ==
- Father's Day (Father MC album), 1990, or the title song
- Father's Day (Kirk Franklin album), 2023
- "Father's Day", a song by Gucci Mane from Evil Genius, 2018
- "Father's Day", a song by Weddings Parties Anything from Difficult Loves, 1992

== Television episodes ==
- "Father's Day" (The Cosby Show), 1984
- "Father's Day" (Cyberchase), 2009
- "Father's Day" (Doctor Who), 2005
- "Father's Day" (Forever Knight), 1994
- "Father's Day" (The Jeffersons), 1983
- "Father's Day" (Jem), 1987
- "Father's Day" (Oh, Doctor Beeching!), 1997
- "Father's Day" (Phineas and Ferb), 2014
- "Father's Day" (Roseanne), 1989
- "Father's Day" (RoboCop: Alpha Commando), 1998
- "Father's Day" (Scorpion), 2014
- "Father's Day" (Shameless), 2012
- "Father's Day" (Superman: The Animated Series), 1997
- "Father's Day" (Peppa Pig), 2019

== Theatre ==
- Father's Day (play), a dark comedy by Oliver Hailey

== See also ==
- Father's Day Bank Massacre
- 2010 Billings tornado, also known as the Father's Day Tornado
- Les Compères, a 1983 French film remade as the 1997 film Father's Day
- Stepfather III, or Stepfather III: Father's Day in home video releases
- "Not a Father's Day", an episode of How I Met Your Mother
- Parents' Day, a holiday combining Father's Day and Mother's Day
- Mother's Day (disambiguation)
