= Jacobinte Swargarajyam (soundtrack) =

Soundtrack album by Shaan Rahman
- Released: 20 February 2016
- Recorded: 2016
- Genre: Feature film soundtrack
- Length: 16:21
- Language: Malayalam
- Label: Muzik 247
- Producer: Shaan Rahman

Shaan Rahman chronology
Vettah (2016)	Jacobinte Swargarajyam (2016)	Oru Muthassi Gadha (2016)

Singles from Jacobinte Swargarajyam
- 1. "Dubai" Released: 6 February 2016

Jacobinte Swargarajyam is the soundtrack to the 2016 film of the same name directed by Vineeth Sreenivasan, starring Nivin Pauly and Renji Panicker. The album featured five songs composed by Shaan Rahman with lyrics written by Manu Manjith, B. K. Harinarayanan, Rzee and Ashwin Gopakumar. The soundtrack to the film was released on 20 February 2016 through Muzik 247, preceded by the lead single "Dubai". The album opened to positive reviews from music critics.

== Background ==
Jacobinte Swargarajyam marked the fourth collaboration between Shaan and Vineeth, following Malarvaadi Arts Club (2010), Thattathin Marayathu (2012) and Thira (2013). Shaan composed the entire soundtrack within two weeks of November 2015, along with other albums for Adi Kapyare Kootamani (2015) and Vettah (2016) and completed scoring the film within a week.

== Release ==
The first song "Dubai" was released by the music label Muzik 247 as a single on 6 February 2016. Within hours of its release, the song became the top track on iTunes "Top 200 Regional Indian" chart, a first in Malayalam music history. Vineeth Sreenivasan, Suchith Suresan and Liya Verghese provided the vocals to "Dubai", with lyrics by Manu Manjith describing the beauty of the city. The lyrical video for the song was 6 March 2016.

The first video song, "Ee Shishirakaalam", featuring the Jacob family – Nivin Pauly, Renji Panicker, Sreenath Bhasi, Lakshmy Ramakrishnan, Aima Rosmy Sebastian, and Stacen was released on 23 March 2016 on the YouTube channel of Muzik247. The song, penned by Harinarayanan B. K. was sung by Vineeth Sreenivasan and Kavya Ajit. The second video song, "Thiruvaavaniraavu", which released on 24 March 2016, featuring the Jacob family was set in the backdrop of Onam celebration of Dubai Malayalees. Unni Menon and Sithara have sung the song with additional vocals by Meera Scharma.

== Reception ==
Nelson K. Paul of Malayala Manorama listed "Thiruvaavaniraavu" in the top five songs in their Tunes Weekly on 1 April 2016. In a review for the soundtrack, Paul said that it has "quality written all over [...] which has an endearing feel to it" and concluded with a verdict: "Shaan-Vineeth combo strikes again". Vipin Nair of Music Aloud assigned 7.5 (out of 10) and called it as "A melody-heavy soundtrack and Shaan Rahman delivers, as he always has – in the genre, and particularly for Vineeth Sreenivasan". Karthik Srinivasan of Milliblog wrote "Vineeth and Shaan's combo wins again, with a quality soundtrack".

== Track listing ==
No.	Title	Lyrics	Singer(s)	Length
1.	"Dubai"	Manu Manjith	Vineeth Sreenivasan, Suchith Suresan, Liya Verghese	02:16
2.	"Ee Shishirakaalam"	B. K. Harinarayanan	Vineeth Sreenivasan, Kavya Ajit	03:25
3.	"Thiruvaavaniraavu"	Manu Manjith	Unni Menon, Sithara Krishnakumar, Meera Scharma	04:01
4.	"Ennilerinju"	Rzee	Rzee, Sithara Krishnakumar	03:15
5.	"Home"	Ashwin Gopakumar	Ashwin Gopakumar	03:24
Total length:				16:21
