= Alemari =

- Film poster
- Directed by: Hari Santhosh
- Written by: Hari Santhosh
- Produced by: B. K. Srinivas
- Starring: Yogesh; Radhika Pandit; Raju Talikote; Rakesh Adiga
- Cinematography: Manjunath M. Nayak
- Edited by: K. M. Prakash
- Music by: Arjun Janya
- Production companies: Ashwini Media Networks; 9 Thots Entertainment
- Release date: 9 March 2012
- Running time: 153 minutes
- Country: India
- Language: Kannada

Alemari transl. Wanderer) is a 2012 Indian Kannada-language action drama film written and directed by Hari Santhosh, in his directorial debut. Santhosh based the story on a real-life contract killing incident by a group of teenagers. The stars Yogesh and Radhika Pandit, alongside Umashree, Rakesh Adiga, Raju Talikote, Adi Lokesh and Mico Nagaraj. The film follows Mohan (Yogesh), a young man whose life takes an unexpected turn after he becomes entangled in the rivalries of aspiring gangsters, forcing him to live as a wanderer.

The film was produced by B. K. Srinivas. Music for the film was composed by Arjun Janya, with Manjunath M. Nayak making his cinematography debut and K. M. Prakash serving as editor. The film was released theatrically 9 March 2012, and received positive to mixed reviews critics. They praised the cast performances, music and cinematography, while criticism was directed towards the film's pacing. The film received four nominations at the 60th Filmfare Awards South including Best Director (Santhosh) and Best Supporting Actress (Umashree). At the 2012 Karnataka State Film Awards, it won two awards: Director's First Time Best Film (Santhosh) and Best Music Director (Janya).

== Plot ==
Muthanna, a mason, transports a group of labourers to a construction site, among whom is a dishevelled and seemingly mentally unstable man who he names Paradesi. Living in a makeshift shelter beside the site, Paradesi is cared for by Muthanna, who pays special attention to him. Troubled by recurring nightmares, Paradesi frequently relives fragments of his past. Through these flashbacks, it is revealed that he was once Mohan, a milkman living with his mother and married sister. Mohan falls in love with Neeli, the daughter of music teacher Sridhar Sastry from a traditional Brahmin family. Although she initially avoids him, Neeli gradually reciprocates his feelings. When Sastry arranges her marriage to another man, a small-time businessman, the couple separate, but Mohan later wins his approval by paying for his heart surgery, allowing their relationship to resume.

Meanwhile, Mohan frequently clashes with a gang led by "Nimhans" Soori. Aspiring to become a feared gangster like his uncle "Katthe" Ravi, Soori begins associating with "Palav" Chandra, Mohan's brother-in-law, who has recently been released from prison. Chandra mentors the youngster and starts assigning him violent tasks. Soori and his associates first murder Naganna, a financier and rowdy who is also an acquaintance of Mohan and had helped him secure a job as a soldier. Chandra later convinces Soori that personal attachments are a weakness for an aspiring don, leading Soori to kill his own uncle. Having carried out both murders, Soori declares that his next target will be Mohan.

Mohan visits Chandra's hideout to confront him over Naganna's death. There, he is ambushed by Soori and his gang, who brutally attack him and leave him for dead on the outskirts of the city. He is later found by labourers working under Muthanna and gradually recovers. However, the assault leaves him physically unrecognisable and mentally scarred. Adopting the identity of Paradesi, he begins living the life of a wandering labourer. By coincidence, Muthanna's team is assigned to construct a house in the same locality where Mohan's mother and Neeli reside. Although both encounter Paradesi on separate occasions, neither recognises him.

Eventually, Neeli notices an amulet she had once given Mohan and realises that Paradesi is the man she loved. She follows him to a bus stand in an attempt to reach him. As Paradesi prepares to board a departing bus, Neeli's husband alights from the same bus, and assumes she has come to receive him, taking her away before she can speak to Mohan. Paradesi boards the bus and leaves. Looking through a shattered piece of glass, he catches sight of Neeli walking away and recognises her as the bus departs, continuing his life as a paradesi (wanderer).

== Cast ==
- Yogesh as Mohan / Pardesi
- Radhika Pandit as Neeli
- Ramesh Bhat as Sridhar Sastry
- Umashree as Saroja, Mohan's mother
- Mico Nagaraj as Naganna
- Adi Lokesh as "Palav" Chandra
- Raju Talikote as Muthanna
- Ramesh Pandit as "Kathhe" Ravi
- Rakesh Adiga as "Nimhans" Soori
- Nayana Puttaswamy as Shruti, Neeli's friend
- Bhaskar as SI P. Bhaskar
- Somanna Machimada as television journalist
- Karibasavaiah as truck driver
- M. N. Lakshmi Devi as Mohan's customer
- Sanketh Kashi as man in bar
- D. P. Raghuram as Jaggu, Mohan's friend (credited as Zee TV Raghu)
- Mandeep Roy as building contractor
- Cockroach Sudhi as Soori's associate (credited as Sudheer)
- K. V. Manjayya as college principal

== Production ==
=== Development ===
The film was announced in 2010. In December 2011, it was reported that Hari Santhosh (or Santosh Kumar), who had previously worked as an associate director for over five years for films like Jogi (2005), Ee Preethi Yeke Bhoomi Melide (2007) and Sanju Weds Geetha (2011) was directing Alemari. He wrote the film's screenplay in around 2006, based on an incident in Kamakshipalya, Bengaluru, involving contract killing by a group of teenage boys studying in PUC.

=== Casting ===
Yogesh and Radhika Pandit were cast to play the lead roles as character from a middle-class family, and as a Brahmin girl respectively, while Rakesh Adiga, who had previously appeared in Jhossh (2009), was cast as the antagonist and slum-dweller. Santhosh noted that the story begins with Yogesh appearing as a character working at a construction site, having moved to a city, who is in for a "culture shock". He added that Yogesh's rough and shoddy looks suited the character perfectly well. Expanding n his character, Santhosh noted that Yogesh is "unkempt throughout the movie. He is orphaned as a child, and the head of the gang, is the one who brings him up. All Yogi does is work, eat and sleep. His imagination doesn't go beyond a certain level, until he steps into a city and begins to think about the people he sees around him. He sees Radhika and begins to imagine her as his love and when he sees an older lady, he imagines her as his mother. People around him influence his thoughts." On her character, Radhika Pandita stated, "I play the role of Neeli, meaning blue in Kannada. She comes from a conservative family and her life doesn't extend beyond home and college but the entry of Yogi changes her life." Ramesh Bhat, Umashree, Adi Lokesh, Raju Talikote, D. P. Raghuram and Ramesh Pandit were hired to play supporting roles.

=== Filming ===
Principal photography took place over 65 days in various slum localities across Bengaluru. Alemari was among the first Kannada films to be shot using the Arri Alexa digital camera. Manjunath Nayak, who had previously worked on advertising films in Mumbai, made his debut as a cinematographer with the film. The soundtrack was composed by Arjun Janya.

== Soundtrack ==
Alemari

Soundtrack album by Arjun Janya
- Released: 15 February 2012
- Genre: Feature film soundtrack
- Length: 29:06
- Label: Ashwini Media

Arjun Janya composed the film's background score and music for its soundtrack, with all the lyrics written by Hari Santhosh. The soundtrack album consisting of nine tracks was distributed by Ashwini Media.

Track listing
No.	Title	Lyrics	Singer(s)	Length
1.	"Ale Aleyo"	Hari Santhosh	Fayaz Khan	4:18
2.	"Alemari"	Hari Santhosh	Fayaz Khan	1:21
3.	"Baa Baa"	Hari Santhosh	Arjun Janya, Rakesh Adiga, Chandan Shetty, Harsha, Santhosh	3:35
4.	"Dheeraja"	Hari Santhosh	Harsha	1:12
5.	"Maribeku Ninna"	Hari Santhosh	Karthik	3:57
6.	"Nee Modala Kavithe"	Hari Santhosh	Vijay Prakash	4:33
7.	"Neeli Neeli"	Hari Santhosh	Javed Ali, Shreya Ghoshal	4:29
8.	"Neeli Neeli (Patho)"	Hari Santhosh	Javed Ali, Shreya Ghoshal	1:25
9.	"Thundu Beedi"	Hari Santhosh	Kailash Kher, Priya Himesh	4:16
Total length:				29:06

== Reception ==
=== Critical response ===
A critic from The Times of India scored the film at four out of five stars and wrote, "Yogesh is brilliant as a loverboy and physically impaired person; Radhika is lively as the girl next door; Nayana impresses you with her bold and beautiful performance; Adi Lokesh has done justice to the role; Josh Rakesh makes a positive beginning as a villain. Music by Arjun Janya has some catchy tunes". B. S. Srivani from Deccan Herald wrote, "But by then the whole drama is over, leaving only lingering sadness and dissatisfaction behind. With the underworld as the backdrop, director Santhu recounts the tale of a wanderer and lets him remain so, all his life. A rootless existence finds resonance in "Alemaari"". Srikanth Srinivasa from Rediff.com scored the film at two-and-a-half out of five stars and wrote, "Director Santhu has missed an opportunity to give his audience a deeper understanding of the film. Although the film is watchable, it could have been handled better and the message of the wanderer be made clearer. It is not really worth wandering into the theatre to watch this movie."

A critic from Bangalore Mirror wrote, "The songs are full of life and good to watch as well. The dialogues are witty in parts and repetitive in bits. If only the maker/editor had a bigger pair of scissors, Alemaari would have been a great watch. Santu, as a director, is definitely promising". Y. Maheswara Reddy from DNA wrote, "The music by Arjun Janya is will leave you humming a few tunes even after the movie, but Neeli Neeli, rendered by Shreya Ghoshal and Javed Ali, deserves a special mentions. Simply put, after a really long time, here’s a Kannada film, you wouldn’t mind watching."

== Awards and nominations ==
Award	Date of ceremony	Category	Recipient(s) and nominee(s)	Result	Ref(s)
Bangalore Times Film Awards	August 2013	Best Film	B. K. Srinivas	Nominated	
Bangalore Times Film Awards	August 2013	Best Director	Hari Santhosh	Nominated	
Bangalore Times Film Awards	August 2013	Best Actor in a Negative Role	Rakesh Adiga	Nominated	
Bangalore Times Film Awards	August 2013	Best Singer (Male)	Fayaz Khan (for song "Ale Aleyo")	Nominated	
Filmfare Awards South	20 July 2013	Best Director	Hari Santhosh	Nominated	
Filmfare Awards South	20 July 2013	Best Supporting Actress	Umashree	Nominated	
Filmfare Awards South	20 July 2013	Best Music Director	Arjun Janya	Nominated	
Filmfare Awards South	20 July 2013	Best Playback Singer – Male	Fayaz Khan (for song "Ale Aleyo")	Nominated	
South Indian International Movie Awards	12–13 September 2013	Best Debutant Director (Kannada)	Hari Santhosh	Nominated	
Karnataka State Film Awards	28 February 2015	Director's First Time Best Film	Hari Santhosh	Won	
Karnataka State Film Awards	28 February 2015	Best Music Director	Arjun Janya	Won	
