= Hari Santhosh =

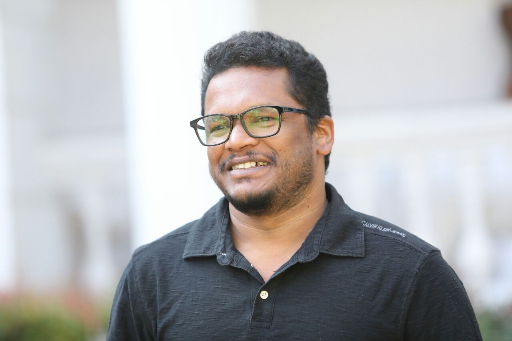
- Hari in 2012

Background information
- Born: 15 January 1984 (age 42); Sringeri, Karnataka, India
- Occupations: Writer, director, producer, lyricist
- Years active: 2012–present
- known for: Alemari(2012), College Kumar(2017), Victory 2(2019), Bicchugatthi Chapter 1(2020)

Hari Santhosh is an Indian film lyricist and director who predominantly works in the Kannada film industry. He is best known for 2012 film Alemari.

== Early life ==
Hari Santhosh was born to Harish and Prema in Koppa, Sringeri and was Brought up in Bengaluru. Santhosh went to 'Sri Siddaganga school Rajajinagar' for his primary education. His father Harish worked as an Art Director in Kannada films and Santhosh accompanied his father in art departmental works during his early days.

== Career ==
Hari Santhosh began his film career by working as an assistant director under Prem for the Kannada films Kariya, Excuse Me, Jogi, Ee Preethi Yeke Bhoomi Melide and as an associate director for Sanju Weds Geetha. Santhosh made his debut as a Director, Writer and Lyricist in the 2012 film Alemari starring Yogesh and Radhika Pandit. Many Critics appreciated the efforts of debut director Hari Santhosh and he was also awarded as the Director's First Time Best Film at Karnataka State Film Award. Later on Santhosh wrote story screenplay and directed several movies like Darling(2014), Dove(2015) and College Kumar(2017) which was officially remade in the year 2020 in Telugu and Tamil Languages. In the year 2020 Hari Santhosh Directed Bicchugatti: Chapter 1 – Dalavayi Dange which is a historical drama based on a book by Dr. B.L. Venu named ' Bicchugatti Baramanna Nayaka'. Currently Hari Santhosh is shooting for By 2 Love and another big budget action thriller 'Bumper' which is currently being filmed .

== Filmography ==
Year	Film	Note
2012	Alemari	Credited as Santhu
2014	Darling	Credited as Santhu
2015	Dove	Credited as Santhu
2017	College Kumar	
2018	Victory 2	
2020	Bicchugatti	
2020	College Kumar	Telugu-Tamil film both shot simultaneously
2022	By Two Love	
TBA	Bumper †	

=== As lyricist ===
Film	Song(s)
Alemari	"Neeli Neeli"
Alemari	"Maribeku Ninna"
Alemari	"Nee Modala Kavite"
Alemari	"Thundu Beedi"
Alemari	"Ale Aleyo"
Alemari	"Dheeraja"
Alemari	"Baa Baa"
Dove	"Ello Nan Dove"
Dove	"Heegu Irabahude Male"
Dove	"Hello Hello"
Dove	"Haalade Haalade"
Dove	"Heegu Irabahudu feeeling"
Dove	"Miss Call Manji"
Darling	"O Darling"
Darling	"Kai Chachu"
Darling	"Naanu swalpa Loosu"
Darling	"Dabba Song"
Darling	"Kanna Neeru"
College Kumar	"Naavu Last Bench"
College Kumar	"Marali Marali"
Akira	"Hudugaru Yella olleru"
Vaasu Naan Pakka Commercial	"Helu Baa"
Preethiya Rayabaari	"Nangu beka Introduction"
Muddu Manase	"Dooradondhu"
Pataki	"Meese Bittivni"
Raj Vishnu	"Lavnya Kai kotbitta"
John Jani Janardhan	"Hudgeer Hudgeer"
Deena	"E Huduge"
Romeo	"Belageddu coffee kudi"
Romeo	"Tunturu Tunturu"
Ko Ko	"Govt College"
18th Cross	"Tirugi Tirugi"
Jayammana Maga	"Bell Bottom"
Hebbuli	"Yenne beku anna"
Tarak	"Sanje Hottu ninne"
Tarak	"Kudi Maga"

== Awards and nominations ==
Year (Note: Refers to the year in which the award ceremony was held.)	Film	Award	Category	Result
2012	Alemari	Karnataka State Film Awards	Best Debut film of Director	Won
2013	Alemari	60th Filmfare Awards South	Best Director	Nominated
