= Sonia Gowda =

Indian actress

- Other name: Soniya Gowda
- Occupation: Actress
- Years active: 2012–2018

Sonia Gowda is a former Indian actress who worked in Kannada films.

== Career ==
Sonia Gowda made her debut with Rana (2012) before starring in Jinke Mari (2013). The film, which was a remake of the Telugu film Bindaas (2010), was modified from the original to have more scenes featuring the heroine. Regarding her performance, a critic noted that she has "done justice to her role". That same year, she starred in the ensemble film Nam Duniya Nam Style (2013) with a critic noting that she made "no impression".

In 2014, she starred in Kwatle Satisha, which was a remake of the Tamil film Naduvula Konjam Pakkatha Kaanom (2012), as the bride that the groom (Sathish Ninasam) forgets on his wedding day. Regarding her performance, a critic wrote that she "has provided justice to the role she plays" whilst another critic called her role a "sweet cameo". In 2015, Preethiyinda was her second film after Rana to feature in a full length role of a married woman. Critics labeled Rakesh Adiga's and her performance as "average" and added that "they still need to be trained to act at emotional sequences".

== Personal life ==
In 2014, she married Rahul Kanthraj.

== Filmography ==
Year	Film	Role	Notes
2012	Rana		
2013	Jinke Mari	Nagalakshmi	
2013	Nam Duniya Nam Style	Maya	
2013	Mangana Kaiyalli Manikya	Roopa	
2013	Dyavre	Chaya	
2014	Kwatle Satisha	Dhanalakshmi	
2015	Preethiyinda	Bhoomika / Amrutha	
2018	Mundina Nildaana Yamaloka	Doctor	short film
