= Kavya Shetty =

Indian actress

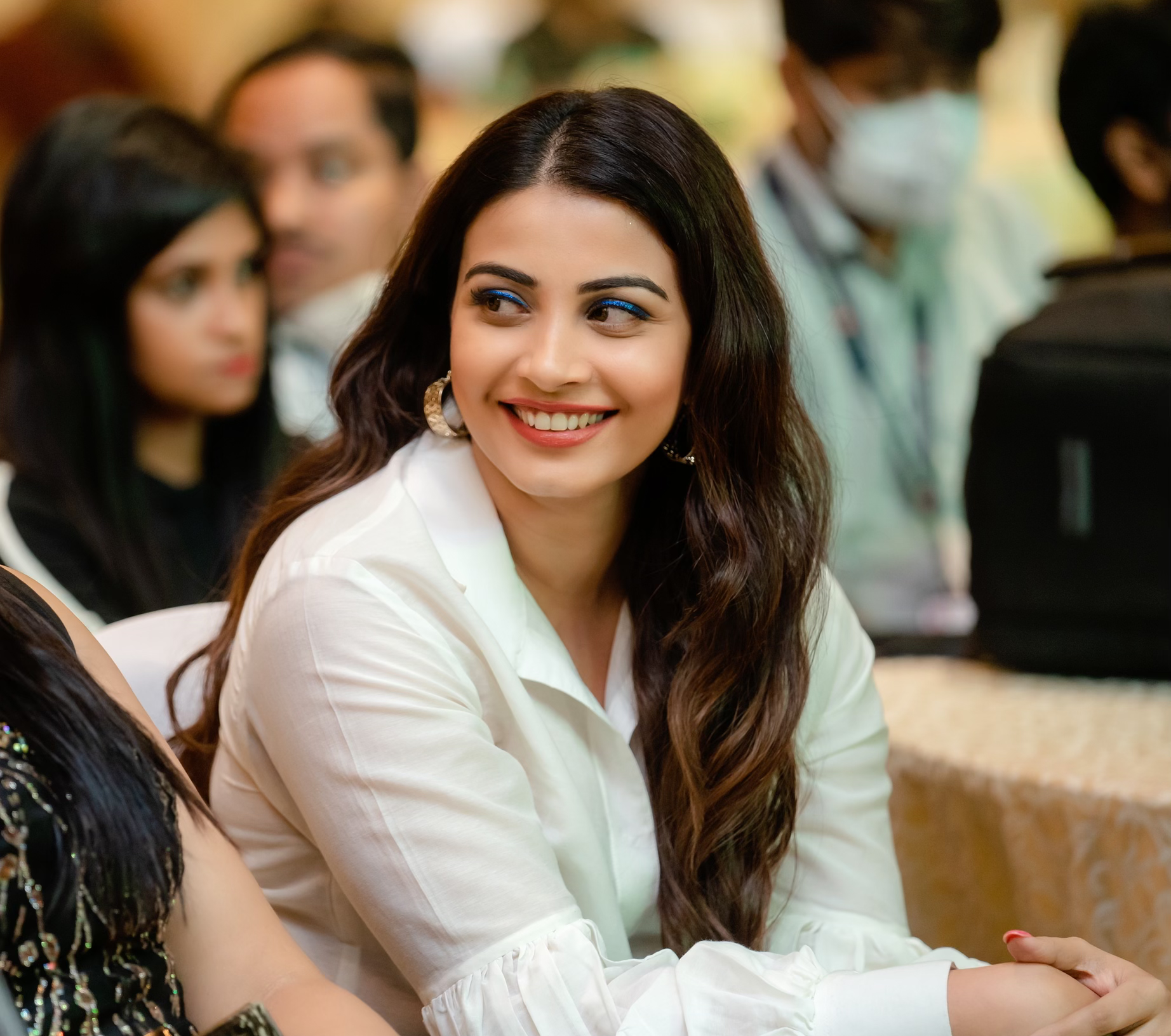
- Shetty in 2021
- Born: Kavya M. Shetty; Mangaluru, Karnataka, India
- Occupations: Actress; model
- Years active: 2011–present
- Height: 5 ft 7 in (1.70 m)

Kavya Shetty is an Indian actress and model who primarily appears in Kannada films. Shetty made her acting debut in 2013 with the Kannada film Nam Duniya Nam Style. She has since received commercial success with Ishtakamya (2016), Zoom (2016), Siliconn City (2017) and Bro Daddy (2022).

== Early life ==
Shetty was born Mangalore, Karnataka. After doing her schooling in Mangalore, she graduated in Computer Science engineering from N.M.A.M. Institute of Technology, Nitte.

== Career ==
While in college, Shetty did a few modelling assignments following appearances in several television commercials. She later moved to Bangalore and took part in 2011 Femina Miss India beauty pageant, winning the 'Miss Photogenic' title. She also worked as a commercial model and appeared in several print and television advertisements.

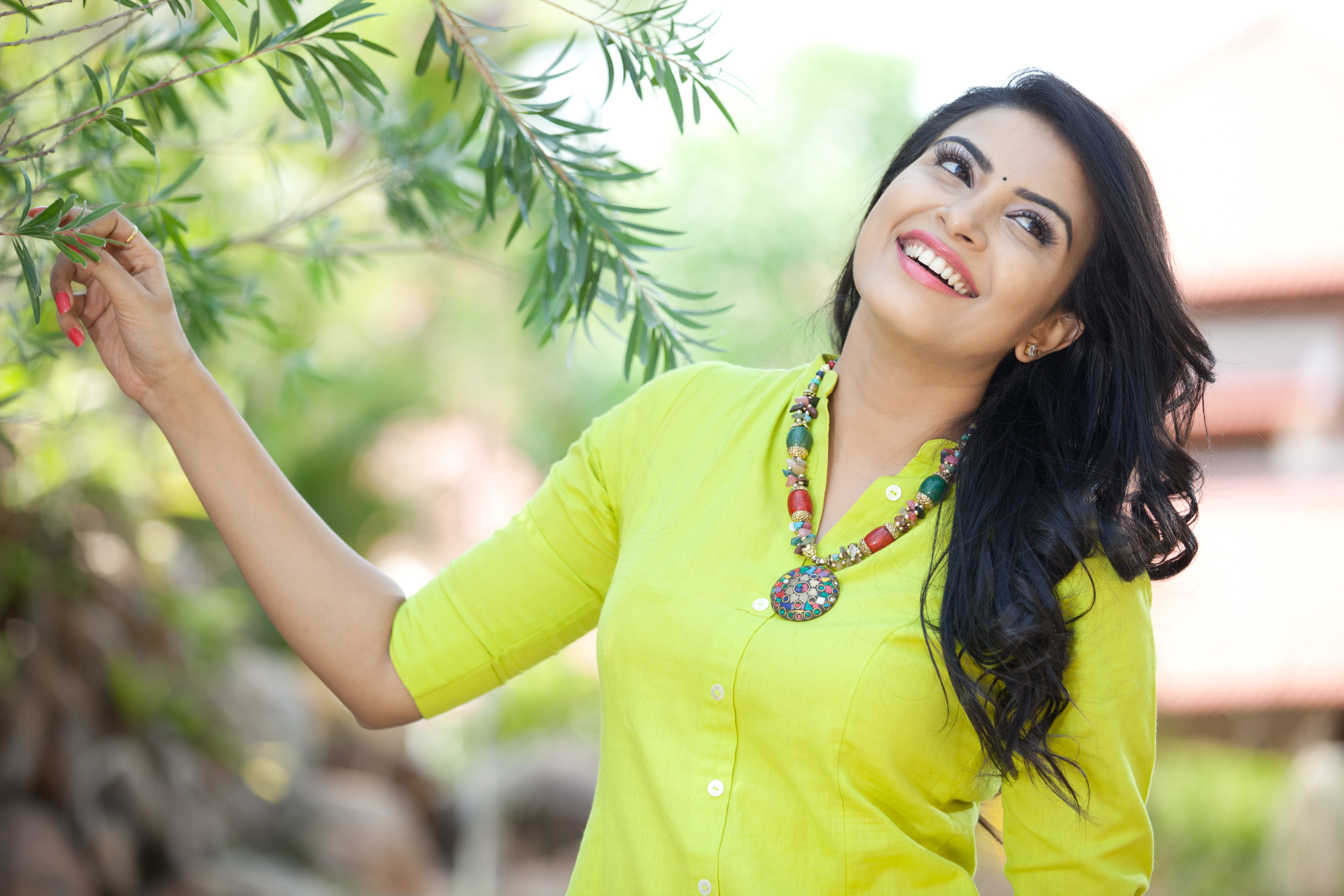
Shetty in 2017

In 2012, Shetty entered the Indian film industry. She first signed to Shivani, a bilingual horror flick, made in Telugu and Tamil, in which she played a journalist. However, the delay of this film meant that Shetty's maiden release was the Kannada film Nam Duniya Nam Style (2013) by Preetham Gubbi. While the film received mixed reviews, critics noted that Shetty had "given [a] lively performance" and "show[n] tremendous promise". Her future releases include the semi-period Kannada film Vijayaaditya. She has also been cast as one of the female leads in A. L. Vijay's next Tamil film, which according to Shetty is a "fun-filled" romantic drama set against a college backdrop.

Shetty saw success with Ishtakamya, directed by well known filmmaker Nagathihalli Chandrashekar. She had three film releases in 2017: Smile Please, starring Gurunandan, MMM', with Aru Gowda; and Silicon City, with Srinagar Kitty.

The year 2020 and 2021 saw Kavya in movies of both Kannada and Telugu language. Kavya set her feet on the sets of Ravichandran's upcoming movie Ravi Bopanna as a lead female, while she was seen in the title track of Yuvarathna starring Puneeth Rajkumar.

Kavya is seen in her upcoming Telugu movie Gurthunda Seethakalam with Satyadev and Tamannaah, directed by Nagashekar. One of the other major project is Yogi-starrer Lanke where she is sharing screens with Sanchari Vijay, Krishi Thapanda Kavya is working on her next project with Jayaram Karthik titled Kaada. The movie is set to release early next year. Her other upcoming projects are Sold which is ready for release and 6C for which the shooting is yet to commence.

== Media image ==
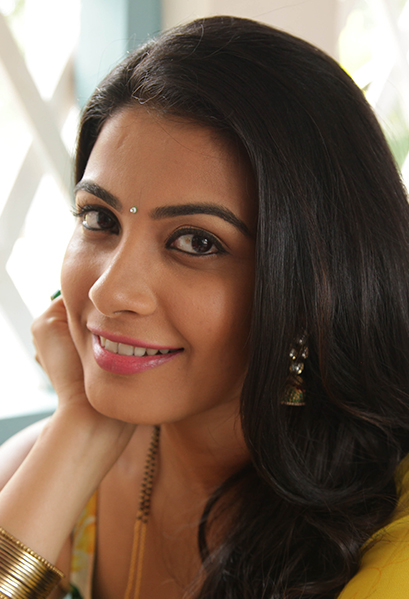
Shetty during Ishtakamya's shoot in 2015

In the Bangalore Time Most Desirable Women list, Shetty was placed 29th in 2017. In 2019, Shetty launched her clothing and jewellery brand, Kassh. She is also connected with Aadyaa Foundation and contribute to children welfare.

== Filmography ==
Year	Title	Role	Language	Notes	Ref.
2013	Nam Duniya Nam Style	Radha	Kannada		
2013	I Am In Love	Krithi	Kannada		
2015	Idhu Enna Maayam	Pallavi	Tamil		
2016	Ishtakamya	Aditi	Kannada		
2016	Zoom	Sheela	Kannada		
2017	Smile Please	Maanasa	Kannada		
2017	Siliconn City	Prerana	Kannada		
2018	3 Gante 30 Dina 30 Second	Sharmila	Kannada		
2018	Samhaara	Janaki	Kannada		
2021	Yuvarathnaa	Herself	Kannada	Special appearance in song "Feel the Power"	
2021	Lanke	Mandara Devi	Kannada		
2022	Bro Daddy	Susan Mathews	Malayalam		
2022	Sold	Ruchitha	Kannada		
2022	Ravi Bopanna	Spoorthy	Kannada		
2022	Captain	Rekha	Tamil		
2022	Gurthunda Seethakalam	Amrutha "Ammu"	Telugu		
2024	Love Li	Herself	Kannada	Special appearance in song "Chikimika"	
2025	Nimagondu Sihi Suddi	Anusha	Kannada		
2026	Production TBD †	TBA	Malayalam	Filming	
2026	Operation Tral	Samruddhi	Malayalam		
