= Sold (2022 film) =

Indian Kannada film

- Poster
- Directed by: Prerana Agarwal
- Written by: Prerana Agarwal
- Produced by: Deepam Kohli
- Starring: Kavya Shetty; Deepam Kohli; Shivani Ballakuraya
- Cinematography: Sameer Deshpande
- Edited by: Chandan CM
- Music by: Jeet Singh
- Release date: 4 January 2022
- Country: India
- Language: Kannada

Sold is a 2022 Indian Kannada-language drama directed by Prerana Agarwal. The cinematography is done by Sameer Deshpande. The film stars Kavya Shetty, Deepam Kohli and Shivani Ballakuraya. The music is composed by Jeet Singh.

== Cast ==
- Kavya Shetty as Ruchitha
- Danish Sait
- Deepam Kohli
- Shivani Ballakuraya

== Release ==
The film was released on 4 January 2022.

=== Critical reception ===
Prathibha Joy of OTTPlay rated the film 3.5/5 stars and wrote, "The film’s serious approach ensures that despite the kidnapping, there’s no melodrama involving the parents, and pretty much sticks to the plot. [...] Sold, is a fairly decently made film, within its budgetary constraints." A. Sharadhaa of Cinema Express gave it 3/5 stars and wrote, "The film, based on real incidents, is disturbing, but allows the core message to come across".
