= Dosti (2014 film) =

2014 Kannada film

- Directed by: Anand V
- Written by: Anand V
- Produced by: Anand V Eeshwar PS; Narendra Sriram
- Starring: Niharikaa Mallya; Prithvi; Siddharth Prakash; Surya; Bank Janardhan
- Cinematography: SK Rao
- Music by: Nagendra Kumar CR
- Release date: 24 January 2014
- Country: India
- Language: Kannada

Dosti is a 2014 Indian Kannada-language film directed by Anand V, starring Niharikaa Mallya, Prithvi, Siddharth Prakash, Surya and Bank Janardhan in lead roles.

== Plot ==
Dosti is a romantic family entertainer. In which, the movie revolves around deep friendship between the four college friends Prithvi (S Eshwar), Mohana (Nandesh), Shashi (Siddarth Prakash) and Vathapi (Vikram). There is also a triangle love story Prithvi and Surya falling in love with Megha (Niharika Mallya). Through this movie director tried to address a social issue which is plaguing our Society from many years.

== Cast ==
- Niharikaa Mallya as Megha
- S Eshwar as Prithvi
- Siddharth Prakash as Shashi
- Satish Kumar as Surya
- Vikram as Vathapi
- Nandesh as Mohana
- Bank Janardhan

== Music ==
Dosti (ದೋಸ್ತಿ)

Soundtrack album by Nagendra Kumar CR
- Released: 2014
- Recorded: 2014
- Genre: Feature film soundtrack
- Length: 21:36
- Language: Kannada

Official audio
- Dosti - Full Album on YouTube

Track listing
No.	Title	Singer(s)	Length
1.	"Ee Dosti Hegide"	Vinod Matakere, Chethan Tulasi, Ashwin M Hiremath	4:34
2.	"Moda Moadala Divasa"	Chethan Tulasi, Akanksha Badami, Santhosh Pathar	4:51
3.	"Munjaneya Sone"	KT Hithan, Anuradha Bhat, Rajesh Krishnan	4:29
4.	"Nanna Hrudaya"	Santhosh Pathar, Anuradha Bhat	4:43
5.	"Yada Yada Hi Dharmasya"	Rakesh Adiga	3:43
6.	"Hegelali Bit"	Santhosh Pathar	0:36
Total length:			21:36

== Reception ==
=== Critical response ===
The Times of India scored the film at 2.5 out of 5 stars and says "It's a good story selected by director V Anand, but he stretches it with unnecessary sequences, making it more boring than educative. It deals with how a college fails to respect the sentiments of a poor student who cannot pay the exam fee, and loses his life when he falls off a building, and how four students take revenge. Perhaps, with a better script and lively narration, the director could have handled the story effectively, confining it to a crisp two hours". Sify wrote that "SK Rao?s camera work that saves the story throughout. Newbies Soorya, Prithvi, Siddarth, Prakash and Niharika Malya manage to impress the college going audience with their expressions taking a back seat. The movie is one for those who are keen on watching violence". Vijaya Karnataka wrote "Although there is a story of college boys, there are fewer college-friendly scenes. Scissors for the fight scenes, would have been better if the Jollydays scenes were augmented. It can also be coupled with a strong love that is not limited to just proposing. Dosti can be added to the list of best and worst movies in Kannada recently". BS Srivani of Deccan Herald wrote "After a long bloodbath, the viewer is clearly ill-treated when for the last 10 minutes of the film he/she is subjected to a dose of supernatural revenge and speeches. The director should know some dostis wouldn’t survive this treatment!" A Sharadhaa of The New Indian Express wrote "Appreciable performances by the first-time actors makes the film viewer friendly. The cinematography, art work and music are okay. The Verdict: Dosthi has tried to address issues plaguing colleges for long. This youth-based story could have been a clean film sans bloodshed and violence".
