= Kwatle Satisha =

- Poster
- Directed by: Mahesh Rao
- Screenplay by: Mahesh Rao
- Based on: Naduvula Konjam Pakkatha Kaanom (Tamil) by Balaji Tharaneetharan
- Produced by: Suri; Jayanna; Bogendra
- Starring: Sathish Ninasam; Chikkanna; Anand; Suri; Sonia Gowda
- Cinematography: H. C. Venu
- Edited by: Deepu S. Kumar
- Music by: V. Harikrishna
- Release date: 18 April 2014
- Running time: 144 minutes
- Country: India
- Language: Kannada

Kwatle Satisha (transl. Mischievous Satisha) is a 2014 Indian Kannada-language comedy film directed by Mahesh Rao and starring Sathish Ninasam, Chikkanna, Anand, Suri, and Sonia Gowda. It is a remake of the Tamil film Naduvula Konjam Pakkatha Kaanom (2012).

== Cast ==
- Sathish Ninasam as Satisha
- Chikkanna as Chikkanna aka Chikka
- Silli Lalli Anand as Ananda
- Suri as Suresh aka Suri
- Sonia Gowda as Dhanalakshmi aka Dhanu
- Achyuth Kumar as Dhanalakshmi's father
- Padmaja Rao as Dhanalakshmi's mother
- Pratham as Prem
- Suchendra Prasad as Doctor
- Rockline Sudhakar as Suri's father
- Hulivana Gangadharaiah as Satisha's father

== Production ==
The title of the film is based on Sathish Ninasam's character from Drama (2012). The film shot began at Maharaja's College, Mysore on 20 February 2013. The first look poster of the film featured Satish Ninasam in the Ghajini getup; however, the actor later clarified that the two films are unrelated.

== Soundtrack ==
The songs were composed by V. Harikrishna.

No.	Title	Lyrics	Singer(s)	Length
1.	"Olle Huduga"	Yogaraj Bhat	Santhosh Venky, Apoorva Sridhar	4:08
2.	"Dankanaka"	Ghouse Peer	Shashank Sheshagiri	3:35
Total length:				7:43

== Release and reception ==
The film was scheduled to release on 28 March 2014 on the same day as Ulidavaru Kandanthe but was delayed. A critic from Sify wrote that "Over all, Kwatle Satisha is a one-time watch with family as well as friends, but definitely a laughter riot!" A critic from Deccan Chronicle wrote that "Ninasum Satisha does a neat job and Sonia Gowda plays a sweet cameo as lead characters with Chickkanna filling the humour part". A critic from Bangalore Mirror wrote that "Kwatle Satisha makes for an engaging watch and should easily take care of a summer afternoon."
