= Mandahasa =

2013 Kannada-language film

- Directed by: Rajesh R Nair
- Written by: Manju Mandavya (dialogue)
- Screenplay by: Rajesh R Nair
- Story by: Rajesh R Nair
- Produced by: S Basava Reddy
- Starring: Rakesh Adiga; Nikki Das; Chethan
- Cinematography: Santhosh Rai Pathaaje
- Edited by: K M Prakash
- Music by: Veer Samarth
- Production company: Advik Motion Picture Company Pvt Ltd
- Release date: 30 August 2013
- Country: India
- Language: Kannada

Mandahasa is a 2013 Indian Kannada-language film directed by Rajesh R Nair, starring Rakesh Adiga, Nikki Das and Chethan in lead roles. The film released on 30 August 2013.

== Cast ==
- Rakesh Adiga as Aditya
- Nikki Das as Anjali
- Chethan as Rohan
- Srinath
- R. G. Vijayasarathy
- All Ok
- Mithra
- Ashok Sharma
- Bhavya

== Production ==
The film began production with a principal photography on 15 December 2009.

In February 2010, news reports falsely claimed that Asha Bhosle made her Kannada debut through this film for the item song "Jotegaaranilla" written by Raghavendra Kamath. The song was never released after producer Prathap Gowda claimed the rights of the song from for the film Manikya, which was later dropped.

== Music ==
Mandahasa

Soundtrack album by Veer Samarth
- Released: 2013
- Recorded: 2013
- Genre: Feature film soundtrack
- Length: 34:12
- Language: Kannada

Official audio
- Mandahasa - Full Album on YouTube

Track listing
No.	Title	Singer(s)	Length
1.	"Kannanchinalli"	Shreya Ghoshal	4:43
2.	"Manase Manase"	Vijay Prakash	4:58
3.	"Modala Chaddi"	Tippu	4:42
4.	"Modala Cheddi"	Chetan Sosca	4:47
5.	"Naada Omkara"	Shankar Mahadevan	5:04
6.	"Sariyenu Ninna"	Veer Samarth	5:40
7.	"Yarigoo Kanada"	Mahalakshmi Iyer, Karthik	5:38
Total length:			34:12

== Reception ==
=== Critical response ===
A critic from The Times of India scored the film at 2.5 out of 5 stars and says "While Chethan has done a splendid job as the first hero, Rakesh Adiga shows amazing talent in the climax with powerful dialogue delivery and body language. Nikki Das has done justice to her role. Srinath as heroine’s father is gracious". A critic from The New Indian Express wrote "The music by Veer Samarth is fresh. All said and done, Mandahasa is definitely a must watch with a hatke (offbeat) love story. The Verdict: This light-hearted musical drama is in top order". B S Srivani from Deccan Herald wrote "Many may not like the close-to-reality climax but looks like ghostly intervention in love matters is making a strong comeback after Shravana Bantu! Music and camerawork are the highlights of Mandahaasa and little else". A critic from Bangalore Mirror wrote "Not bad, but the actors are too immature to pull it off. It would be a spoiler to reveal the only turning point in the film. But we cannot help, but say that Mandahasa is a humbler version of Shravana Bantu".
