= Manasology (film) =

- VCD Cover
- Directed by: Deepak Aras
- Written by: Deepak Aras; Ashok Maddhur (dialogues)
- Produced by: Deepak Aras
- Starring: Amulya; Rakesh
- Cinematography: Sugnan
- Edited by: Jo Ni Harsha
- Music by: J. Anoop Seelin
- Production company: Cinisparsha Creations
- Release date: 23 September 2011
- Country: India
- Language: Kannada

Manasology (transl. Study of the heart) (Note: The title can also mean the study of Manas, the character played by Rakesh.) is a 2011 Indian Kannada-language romantic drama film directed by Deepak Aras and starring his sister Amulya and Rakesh. The film released to negative reviews and was a box office failure.

== Plot ==
The film is based on a true story of an incident that happened to a girl in Bangalore. She was stressed and in the hospital. She was in love with a boy whom she had never met with in real life and had only talked over the phone with.

== Cast ==
- Amulya as Sihi
- Rakesh as Manas
- Achyuth Kumar as Sihi's father
- Manjunath Raj
- Sadhu Kokila

== Production ==
The film was shot in Bangalore and Mysore. The film completed most of its shooting by March 2011.

== Soundtrack ==
The songs were composed by Anoop Seelin. The lyrics were written by Arasu Anthare and Ashok Maddur. The songs were released under the label Anand Audio.

Track listing
No.	Title	Singer(s)	Length
1.	"Manasaalogy"	J. Anoop Seelin, Apoorva Sridhar, Sunitha S. Murali	3:41
2.	"Acchu Mecchu Preethi Hucchu"	Rithisha Padmanabh, Harsha Sadananda	5:23
3.	"Kambani Tumbida"	J. Anoop Seelin	4:12
4.	"Narkakkilsi"	J. Anoop Seelin, Oscar Aloysius	4:19
5.	"Preethiya Sarathi"	M. D. Pallavi	4:35
6.	"Mankutimma"	Rabeendra Soragavi, J. Anoop Seelin	4:26
Total length:			26:36

== Reception ==
A critic from Rediff.com gave the film a negative review criticizing the story, acting and music. A critic from IANS wrote that "Manasology suffers because of immature handling. Avoid it". A critic from Webdunia also gave the film a negative review.
