= Nimagondu Sihi Suddi =

2025 Indian comedy drama film

- Theatrical release poster
- Directed by: Raghu Bhat; Sudhindra Nadiger
- Written by: Raghu Bhat
- Produced by: Harish N. Gowda
- Starring: Raghu Bhat; Kavya Shetty
- Cinematography: Anand Sunderesha
- Edited by: Naveen Tej; Raghunatha L.
- Music by: Ashwin Hemanth
- Production company: Avyakta Cinemas
- Release date: 21 February 2025
- Running time: 133 minutes
- Country: India
- Language: Kannada

Nimagondu Sihi Suddi (transl. A sweet news for you) is a 2025 Indian Kannada-language comedy drama film directed by Raghu Bhat and Sudhindra Nadiger. Written by Raghu Bhat, the film is produced by Harish N. Gowda under the banner Avyakta Cinemas. It stars Raghu Bhat, Kavya Shetty, Harini Shreekanth, Sujay Shastry, and Padmini Narasimhan. With cinematography by Anand Sunderesha, editing by Naveen Tej Raghunatha L., and a musical score composed by Ashwin Hemanth, the film was predominantly shot in Bengaluru and the coastal landscapes of Goa.

Released theatrically on 21 February 2025, Nimagondu Sihi Suddi received mixed reviews from critics and underperformed at the box-office.

== Plot ==
Arjun Hebbar, a celebrated chef, wakes up one night with severe abdominal pain and rushes to a hospital, where doctors inexplicably prepare him for what looks like childbirth. He faints during the commotion and later regains consciousness at home, assuming it was a dream—until he discovers a baby girl in his house and a fresh surgical scar on his abdomen. Shocked and desperate, Arjun seeks help from his friend Deen Dayala (DD) and approaches Inspector Narayan, hoping to uncover how the child appeared and whether he truly experienced a male pregnancy.

The investigation unfolds with comic interludes at the police station and among neighbors, while flashbacks reveal Arjun's earlier romance with Anusha, a food brand owner, and the rift that separated them. As Arjun and DD retrace events from the past three months, they encounter misleading clues, medical opinions, and even a detour to Goa in search of answers. The second half sees Anusha reenter Arjun's life, intertwining the mystery with emotional reconciliation. Ultimately, the truth behind the baby and Arjun's scar is revealed, steering him toward acceptance and responsibility.

== Cast ==
- Raghu Bhat as Arjun Hebbar
- Kavya Shetty as Anusha
- Harini Shreekanth as Sheela
- Sujay Shastry as Police inspector Narayan
- Padmini Narasimhan
- Prajwal as Deen Dayala aka DD
- Vijay Raghavendra as Dr. Vikas (Cameo appearance)

== Production ==
The project was announced in August 2020 as a web series starring Kavya Shetty alongside debutante Raghu Bhat, a former software engineer. It was filmed in Bangalore and Goa. Apart from writing the script and acting in the lead role, Raghu Bhat co-directed the film with Sudhindra Nadiger.

== Soundtrack ==
The film has soundtrack composed by Ashwin Hemanth.

Track listing
No.	Title	Lyrics	Singer(s)	Length
1.	"Maguve"	Pramod Maravanthe	Abhijith Rao, Ashwin Hemanth	4:28
2.	"Mayagara"	Pramod Maravanthe	Ashwin Hemanth, Anjana Balakrishnan	3:56
3.	"Love You Goa"	Ashwin Hemanth	Ashwin Hemanth

== Release ==
Nimagondu Sihi Suddi was released theatrically on 21 February 2025.

== Reception ==
Sridevi S. of The Times of India rated the film two-and-a-half out of five stars and wrote, "Raghu, who has handled multiple responsibilities as lead actor, director and writer has done a commendable job. The comedy, however, could have been better, as the jokes don’t land as expected. There is plenty of drama, too." Y. Maheswara Reddy of Bangalore Mirror gave it two-and-a-half out of five stars and wrote, "The movie is worth a watch for those who want some relief from the mundane."

A. Sharadhaa of Cinema Express gave it two-and-a-half out of five stars and wrote, "While the strange and unpredictable nature of the plot keeps things interesting at first, it eventually slows down and feels drawn-out. The film spends too much time on events that don’t help push the story forward." Shashiprasad SM of Times Now gave it two-and-a-half out of five stars and wrote, "Not for serious minds, this one is simply a silly time-pass with a touch of suspense and drama."
