= Jinke Mari =

- Theatrical release poster
- Directed by: K. P. Naveen Kumar
- Screenplay by: K. P. Naveen Kumar
- Produced by: Mahesh Balekundri
- Starring: Yogesh; Sonia Gowda
- Cinematography: Venus Murthy
- Edited by: K. M. Prakash
- Music by: Sai Karthik
- Production company: Peacock Cinemas
- Release date: 24 May 2013
- Country: India
- Language: Kannada

Jinke Mari is a 2013 Indian Kannada-language film directed by K. P. Naveen Kumar and produced by Mahesh Balekundri. It is a remake of the 2010 Telugu film Bindaas. The film stars Yogesh, Sonia Gowda, Sharath Lohitashwa, Shobaraj and Ramesh Bhat. It was theatrically released on 24 May 2013.

== Synopsis ==
Two families get into a long feud after a man's brother-in-law dies, but a young man from one of the families decides to end the conflict. Soon after, he starts living with the other family posing to be someone else and tries to win hearts.

== Cast ==
- Yogesh as Ajay
- Sonia Gowda as Nagalakshmi
- Avinash as Shivana Gowda
- Sharath Lohithaswa as Rudregowda
- Shobaraj as Babu
- Ramesh Bhat
- Jai Jagadish
- Harish Roy
- Achyuth Kumar
- Sharadamma
- Vijay Kaundinya
- Ninasam Ashwath
- Harish Raj
- Bullet Prakash as Narasimha
- Suman Ranganathan as an item number in "Bangaara Petege"

== Production ==
Principal photography commenced in May 2012 at Hesaraghatta in Bangalore. The filming of the song "Bangaara Petege" featuring Suman Ranganathan was completed in early August 2012.

== Soundtrack ==
Jinke Mari

Soundtrack album by Sai Karthik
- Released: 2013
- Recorded: 2013
- Genre: Feature film soundtrack
- Length: 22:01
- Language: Kannada

Sai Karthik chronology
| Noothi Lo Kappalu (2013) | Jinke Mari (2013) | Paisa (2014) |

Official audio
- Jinke Mari- Full Album on YouTube

The music was composed by Sai Karthik. The soundtrack of the album was released on 4 April 2013.

| No. | Title | Artist(s) | Length |
|---|---|---|---|
| 1. | "Hudgeerna Mundbitte" | Kailash Kher | 3:42 |
| 2. | "Beda Maga" | Sai Karthik | 4:19 |
| 3. | "Bangaara Petege (Narasamma)" | Mamta Sharma, Priya, Sai Karthik | 4:06 |
| 4. | "Enaagide" | Shaan | 4:12 |
| 5. | "Marubhoomi" | Mahesh Balekundri | 3:06 |
| 6. | "Beda Maga (Remix)" | Sai Karthik | 3:16 |
| Total length: | | | 22:01 |

== Reception ==
A reviewer of Deccan Herald wrote "Despite its pitfalls and lack of a polished attempt at providing ensemble entertainment, Jinkemari makes for a decent outing for the regulars, especially those that swear by Yogesh". Keerthi Kolgar from Kannada Prabha says "Suman Ranganath's item song is more eye-catching than ear-catching. Those who say it's been too long to laugh can pay a visit to 'Zinkemari'! Don't ask for another reason". A reviewer from The Times of India wrote "The comedy track of Shobhraj and Bullet Prakash is excellent. Vijay Kaundinya shows signs of becoming a villain of the future. Music by Saikarthik has good tunes. Venus Murthy’s cinematography is a treat". A reviewer from Bangalore Mirror wrote "All said and viewed, this is certainly one of the better films of Yogesh and his fans should be happy with the product".
