= Preethiyinda =

- Theatrical release poster
- Directed by: Raju Halaguru
- Written by: Raju Halaguru
- Starring: Rakesh Adiga; Sonia Gowda
- Cinematography: S. Ramesh
- Edited by: N M Vishwa
- Music by: Rajesh Ramanath
- Production company: Sri Guru Anugraha Productions
- Release date: 17 July 2015
- Country: India
- Language: Kannada

Preethiyinda (transl. With love) is a 2015 Indian Kannada-language romantic drama film directed by Raju Halaguru and starring Rakesh Adiga and Sonia Gowda with Avinash in a supporting role.

== Cast ==
- Rakesh Adiga as Karthik
- Sonia Gowda as Bhoomika a.k.a. Amrutha
- Avinash as Amar Kumar Pandey
- Girija Lokesh as Bhoomika's mother
- Ninasam Ashwath
- Lakshmi Chandrashekar as Karthik's mother

== Production ==
The film was in production for two years.

== Soundtrack ==
The music was composed by Rajesh Ramanath.

Preethiyinda

Soundtrack album by Rajesh Ramanath
- Released: 2015
- Genre: Feature film soundtrack
- Length: 24:40
- Language: Kannada
- Label: Anand Audio

Rajesh Ramanath chronology
| Sachin! Tendulkar Alla (2014) | Preethiyinda (2015) | Bettanagere (2015) |
External audio
- Preethiyinda – Jukebox on YouTube

Track listing
| No. | Title | Lyrics | Singer(s) | Length |
|---|---|---|---|---|
| 1. | "Preethiyinda Preethisuvanta" | Preethiyinda Mahesh | Santhosh Venky | 4:31 |
| 2. | "Aamanthrana Needuve" | Vishwaradhya | Rajesh Krishnan | 4:55 |
| 3. | "Usiraane Nanna Olave" | Usiraane Ajay | Hemanth, Anuradha Bhat | 4:55 |
| 4. | "Aanu Male Maadesha" | Ravikumar | B. Jayashree | 4:45 |
| 5. | "Kannachinalli Neenu" | Preethiyinda Mahesh | Aakanksha Baadami | 5:34 |
| Total length: | | | | 24:40 |

== Reception ==
A critic from Sify wrote that "Overall, it is a below average movie and can be skipped!" A critic from The Hindu wrote that "Preetiyinda creates its own nonsensical universe. The film heightens stereotypes of the ideal son, the lover and the idea of love itself. Far from earning applause, Preetiyinda is a distressing experience". A critic from Deccan Herald wrote that "Seeped in myriad of sentiments, debutant director Raju Halagur’s Preethiyinda turns out to be one of missed opportunity. Halagur’s honest intentions of a clean, message-oriented movie is appreciable".
