= Kannadakkaagi Ondannu Otti =

2018 Kannada film directed by Kushal Gowda

- Directed by: Kushal Gowda
- Starring: Shatamarshan Avinash, Krishi Thapanda,
- Music by: Arjun Janya
- Release date: 6 July 2018
- Country: India
- Language: Kannada

Kannadakkaagi Ondannu Otti (English: Dial One for Kannada) is a 2018 Indian Kannada-language film directed by Kushal Gowda starring Shatamarshan Avinash and Krishi Thapanda. The cast includes Chikkanna, Dattanna, Rangayana Raghu, Suchendra Prasad.

== Cast ==
- Krishi Thapanda
- Shatamarshan Avinash
- Chikkanna
- Dattanna
- Rangayana Raghu
- Suchendra Prasad
- Shruti Badami

== Plot ==
Avinash is a young journalist who meets his friend after many years. They set out on a journey, during which Avinash opens up about his love story. However, their lives take a different turn soon after.

== Soundtrack ==
All the songs composed by Arjun Janya. The song "Nana mele nanageega" became a hit.

Track listing
No.	Title	Lyrics	Singer(s)	Length
1.	"Nana Mele Nanageega"	Kushal Gowda	Sonu Nigam
2.	"Yella Halli Love Story"	V. Nagendra Prasad	Vijay Prakash
3.	"Ommomme Nannannu"	Yogaraj Bhat	Shreya Ghoshal
4.	"Rasthe Pakka Boddi Haida"	Kushal Gowda	Vijay Prakash
5.	"Kannadakkagi Ondannu Otti"	Yogaraj Bhat	Vijay Prakash
6.	"Neene Geechida Saalina"	Kushal Gowda	Sanjith Hegde
