= Nam Duniya Nam Style =

2013 film

- Directed by: Preetham Gubbi
- Written by: Preetham Gubbi
- Produced by: Preetham Gubbi
- Starring: Likith Shetty; Vinayak Joshi; Krishna; Sonia Gowda; Milana Nagaraj; Kavya Shetty
- Cinematography: H. C. Venu
- Music by: Shaan Rahman
- Production company: Gubbi Talkies
- Release date: 28 June 2013
- Running time: 136 minutes
- Country: India
- Language: Kannada

Nam Duniya Nam Style (transl. Our world our style) is a 2013 Indian Kannada adventure film, written, directed and produced by Preetham Gubbi. It stars Likith Shetty, Vinayak Joshi, Krishna, Sonia Gowda, Milana Nagaraj, and Kavya Shetty.

== Synopsis ==
The film is "about three people who hail from different backgrounds and who have been friends for 15 years. The trio are a jovial and fun-loving lot, and are excited about their first travel abroad together", said Preetham, who admitted he was inspired by the Farhan Akhtar Hindi film Dil Chahta Hai (2001).

== Cast ==
- Likith Shetty as Preetham
- Krishna as Yogi
- Vinayak Joshi as Umesh Shetty
- Sonia Gowda as Maya
- Milana Nagaraj as Milana
- Kavya Shetty as Radha
- Rangayana Raghu
- Sadhu Kokila
- Padmaja Rao

== Production ==
The film was extensively shot in Karnataka, Kashmir and Malaysia.

== Music ==
The music of the film was composed by Shaan Rahman which marked his debut in Kannada cinema.

Track list
No.	Title	Singer(s)	Length
1.	"Chooraadaaga"	Shaan Rahman
2.	"Kanasige"	Shaan Rahman
3.	"Nalla Nalla"	Anuradha Bhat, Sachin Warrier
4.	"Sorry Please Thank You"	Tippu, Vineeth Sreenivasan
5.	"Take It Easy"	Tippu, Kavya Ajit

== Release ==
=== Critical reception ===
A critic from The Times of India wrote that "Director Preetham Gubbi, one of the talented directors in Sandalwood, could have done a better job of the romantic story with some lively sequences". A. Sharadhaa of The New Indian Express wrote that "Nam Duniya, Nam Style is missing Preetham Gubbi’s magic". A critic from Deccan Herald wrote, "Nam Duniya Nam Style is an almost well-made yet irreverent film — perfect for passing the time and getting entertained without digging deep".
