= Rana (film) =

- Theatrical release poster
- Directed by: G. Srinivasamurthy
- Written by: Lakshman
- Produced by: Shivananda Madashetty
- Starring: Ambareesh; Pankaj; Supreetha
- Cinematography: Rajaratna
- Edited by: B. S. Kemparaju
- Music by: V. Sridhar
- Production company: Adithya Creations
- Release date: 7 July 2012
- Country: India
- Language: Kannada

Rana is a 2012 Indian Kannada-language action drama film directed by G. Srinivasamurthy and starring Ambareesh, Pankaj and Supreetha.

== Cast ==
- Ambareesh
- Pankaj as Suri
- Supreetha as Sujatha
- Archana
- Sonia Gowda
- Dharma

== Production ==
Since the film glorified violence, the Karnataka State Censor Board refused to certify the film and the film was sent to Mumbai for certification.

== Reception ==
A critic from the IANS wrote that "Rana is one film that you should avoid watching as it has too much of senseless violence and gory sequences". A critic from Bangalore Mirror wrote that "The film does not have the depth of the subject it deals with. However, the personal stories of the main characters are beyond the ordinary". A critic from The Times of India called the film "violent" and added that it "doesn’t send a good message to the masses". A critic from Webdunia wrote that "Director Srinivasamurthy has scratched the same story that has been worn out and finished. If there was something new, it would have been okay".
