= Mandya to Mumbai =

- Directed by: Rajasekhar; Vaardhik Joseph
- Written by: Rajasekhar Vaardhik Joseph
- Story by: R. Panneerselvam
- Produced by: S. Jyothi Lingam
- Starring: Rakesh Adiga; Sanjjana; Amrutha Rao
- Cinematography: Darshan Kanaka & Vishwesh Shiva Prasad
- Edited by: Marison
- Music by: Charan Raj
- Production company: Sree Neela Durga Parameshwari Combines
- Release date: 30 December 2016
- Running time: 168 minutes
- Country: India
- Language: Kannada

Mandya to Mumbai is a 2016 Kannada-language film co-written and directed by Rajasekhar and Vaardhik Joseph D. starring Rakesh Adiga, Sanjjana and Amrutha Rao. The film is a remake of Tamil film Renigunta. The plot revolves around young criminals and explores the reasons that instigate them to commit crime.

== Plot ==
The movie begins in Mandya where Ganesh leads a happy life with his parents. A shocking incident changes his life. His parents are murdered by an anti-social and Ganesh is forced to go to prison, where he is tortured. He comes across four criminals, Bharatesh, Jalendra, Kumar and Ruman, in the prison. These hardcore criminals break loose from the prison and help Ganesh take revenge on his parents' killers. They decide to go to Mumbai where they plan to become big gangsters. But fate has other plans.

== Cast ==
- Rakesh Adiga as Ganesh
- Naveen Krishna
- Sadhu Kokila
- Thilak Shekar
- Sanjjana
- Theepetti Ganesan as Jalendra
- Amrutha Rao
- Achyuth Kumar as Ganesh's father
- Raajashekar
- Chandan
- Chirag
- Achyuth Kumar
- Kaddipudu Chandru
- Mico Nagaraj
- Petrol Prasanna
- Kote Prabhakar
- Madhuri Itagi (item number for "Deola Deola Open The Door")

== Soundtrack ==
Mandya to Mumbai

Soundtrack album by Charan Raj
- Released: 2015
- Recorded: 23 January 2015
- Genre: Feature film soundtrack
- Language: Kannada
- Label: Anand Audio

Charan Raj has composed the film's soundtrack. The soundtrack album consists of 6 tracks.

Actor Sudeepa recorded two songs for the soundtrack including "Deola Deola Open The Door".

No.	Title	Artist(s)	Length
1.	"Damaru Bole"	Sudeepa, Charan Raj
2.	"Deola Deola"	Sudeepa, Sangeetha Katti
3.	"Mandya to Mumbai"	Vardhik Joseph
4.	"Kelamma Chinnamma"	Haricharan, Mridula Warrier
5.	"Meesa Polisa"	Sydney, Galiyano
6.	"Mamatheya Madilalli"	Ustad Hafiz Khan, Charan Raj

== Reception ==
The Times of India gave the film a rating of two-and-a-half out of five stars and wrote that "This film does have its moments that make you sit up and take notice, but you need to stock up some patience to keep yourself without fidgeting between those scenes. Watch this film if you like stories that deal with the underdogs and their valour".
