= Landlord (film) =

Indian Kannada-language action drama film

- Theatrical release poster
- Directed by: Jadesh K Hampi
- Written by: Jadesh K Hampi
- Screenplay by: Jadesh K Hampi; M M Shrikantha (Dialogues)
- Produced by: K. S. Suraj Gowda; K. V. Sathyaprakash
- Starring: Vijaya Kumar; Rachita Ram; Raj B. Shetty; Rakesh Adiga
- Cinematography: Swamy J. Gowda
- Edited by: K. M. Prakash
- Music by: B. Ajaneesh Loknath
- Production company: Sarathi Films
- Release date: 23 January 2026
- Country: India
- Language: Kannada

Landlord is a 2026 Indian Kannada-language action drama film written and directed by Jadesh K Hampi, and produced by K. S. Suraj Gowda and K. V. Sathyaprakash under the Sarathi Films banner. It Began Digital Streaming From March 19th 2026 in Zee5.

The cast includes Vijaya Kumar in the lead role, alongside Rachita Ram, Raj B. Shetty, Rithanya Vijay, Shishir Baikady, Umashree, Bhavana Rao, Rakesh Adiga, and Achyuth Kumar in supporting roles.

The film was released on 23 January 2026. The film's narrative is set in a rural backdrop of the 1980s, recreating period-specific visuals.

== Plot ==
Set in rural Karnataka in the 1980s, Landlord follows Rachayya, a quiet and idealistic labourer who lives with his wife Ningavva and daughter Bhagya, aspiring for dignity and a small piece of land of his own. His village, however, is firmly controlled by Sanna Dhani, an influential landlord whose authority extends across land ownership, local politics and social hierarchy. Though Rachayya believes in lawful change and hopes institutions will protect the weak, he increasingly witnesses the exploitation, caste‑based oppression and fear that govern daily life under Dhani’s rule.

When incidents of violence and injustice escalate—most notably the death of an innocent family—the villagers’ long‑standing frustrations erupt. These events force Rachayya to confront the limits of his patience. As the community’s trust in legal remedies fades, the villagers rally behind him, recognising his integrity and quiet strength. Rachayya gradually transforms from a hopeful, rule‑abiding man into a reluctant leader who channels the villagers’ anger into collective resistance against the landlord’s dominance.

The conflict ultimately builds toward a decisive confrontation in which the villagers challenge generations of entrenched power. The struggle becomes not only about reclaiming land but also about restoring dignity and societal balance. By the end, Rachayya’s journey embodies the film’s central theme: that real change in a skewed social order can emerge when a community unites against injustice, even at great personal cost.

== Cast ==
- Vijaya Kumar as Rachayya
- Rachita Ram as Ningavva
- Raj B. Shetty as Sanna Dhani
- Rakesh Adiga
- Rithnya Vijay as Bhagya
- Shishir Baikady as Devi
- Achyuth Kumar
- Umashree
- Bhavana Rao
- Mithra
- Abhi Das
- Sharath Lohitashwa
- Gopalkrishna Deshpande
- Bhavya Gowda
- B. Suresha
- Chayashree Umesh

== Production ==
=== Development and announcement ===
After a 14-year hiatus, Sarathi Films returned to production with Landlord as their flagship project under director Jadesh Kumar Hampi and producers K. S. Suraj Gowda and K. V. Sathyaprakash. The film was conceptualized to be a socially relevant action‑drama, weaving themes of rural injustice and resistance into a period setting. It was officially launched with a muhurta ceremony in early January 2025, coinciding with lead actor Duniya Vijay's birthday. The project aimed to recreate the rural Karnataka setting of the 1980s. Principal photography began soon after the launch, with elaborate village sets constructed near Nelamangala under the supervision of art director Ravi Santhehaklu. The makers adopted a multi-schedule approach, completing two major schedules by mid-January and progressing into the third phase shortly thereafter.

By late January 2025, approximately 75% of the filming was complete, covering key sequences across Nelamangala, Mangaluru, Tumakuru, and parts of Uttara Karnataka to capture authentic landscapes. The production wrapped up all shooting schedules by August 2025, after nearly eight months of work, and subsequently moved into post-production, including editing and music composition by B. Ajaneesh Loknath. The film's teaser was released in November 2025, confirming its theatrical release for January 2026.

=== Casting ===
Duniya Vijay was signed early as the lead, drawing on his rural roots to embody the protagonist. Rachita Ram joined as a young constable pivotal to the plot, while theatre veterans like Umashree and Achyuth Kumar were cast for authenticity. Raj B. Shetty came on board as the antagonist after discussions about the character's emotional depth and period look; he agreed to wear a wig to suit the director's vision. Rithanya Vijay, daughter of Duniya Vijay, makes her debut as his on-screen child, and actors such as Bhavana Rao, Rakesh Adiga, and Shishir Baikady complete the ensemble.

== Music ==
The soundtrack and background score for Landlord are composed by B. Ajaneesh Loknath, with lyrics contributed by Yogaraj Bhat and others. The album blends folk influences and period-appropriate arrangements to reflect the film's 1980s rural setting. Music rights are held by Anand Audio.

The first single, "Ningavva Ningavva", was released on 18 December 2025 across major streaming platforms and Anand Audio's official YouTube channel. Sung by Vijay Prakash and Ananya Bhat, with lyrics by Yogaraj Bhat, the track features choreography by Bhushan and visuals showcasing lead actors Duniya Vijay and Rachita Ram. Additional singles and the complete soundtrack are scheduled for release ahead of the film's theatrical debut on 23 January 2026.

Track listing
No.	Title	Lyrics	Singer(s)	Length
1.	"Ningavva Ningavva"	Yogaraj Bhat	Vijay Prakash, Ananya Bhat	4:32
2.	"Romaanchaka"	Nagarjun Sharma	Sanjith Hegde, Harshika Devanath	3:50

== Reception ==
Sruthi Ganapathy Raman of The Hollywood Reporter India said that "On its surface, Jadeshaa K. Hampi’s Landlord details a land conflict drama, but the treatment of the film — on the subtext level it is very deep into the real incidents, deep philosophy. It is enhanced with great visuals, chest-thumping actions and exhilerating plotting — is such that a simple land rights story grows into a deep study of socialogy, innovative bloodfest." Swaroop Kodur of The News Minute said that "Landlord is filled with many opportunities to create drama, writing seems to be aware of them, introducing elements like Adaviraaya and a rich mythology around Raachayya enhances intensity, making the narrative so coherent that you get hooked to track of pretty much everything after a point."

== Box Office Collection ==
The film was well received in theatres. On its opening day, the film grossed ₹2.8 crore worldwide, being the highest day-one grossing Kannada film in 2026. In its first three day weekend, the film grossed over ₹16 crore. It grossed around ₹18 crore from Karnataka in 25 days of its release

As of 10 February 2026, Zee5 acquired the OTT rights for ₹5.2 crore. As of 20 February 2026, the film grossed ₹25 crore worldwide.
