= Karnataka Ayodhyapuram =

Indian Kannada-language film

- Directed by: V Lava
- Starring: Rakesh Adiga; Nayana Gowda; Achyuth Kumar
- Cinematography: William David
- Music by: Sagar Nagabhushan
- Release date: 29 November 2013
- Country: India
- Language: Kannada

Karnataka Ayodhyapuram is a 2013 Indian Kannada-language film directed by V Lava, stars Rakesh Adiga, Nayana Gowda and Achyuth Kumar. Initially embroiled in controversy over its title and production challenges, the film was released on 29 November 2013. It explores themes tied to mythological and contemporary settings, drawing attention for its ambitious narrative and the legal hurdles it faced during development.

== Plot ==
The storyline of Karnataka Ayodhyapuram revolves around a blend of mythological inspiration and modern-day drama set in a fictional town named Ayodhyapuram. The narrative centers on a character portrayed as a modern equivalent of Lord Rama, navigating challenges in a politically charged environment. The film juxtaposes traditional values with contemporary issues, leading to a conflict-ridden tale of love, duty, and societal expectations. Critics noted that the execution struggled to maintain coherence, with the ambitious mix of genres leaving some narrative threads unresolved.

== Cast ==
- Rakesh Adiga as Prakash
- Nayana Gowda as Mumtaz
- Achyuth Kumar
- Swasthik Shanker
- Bullet Prakash
- Akshay
- Harish
- Mohan Juneja
- Ramesh Pandith
- Mithra
- Shille Manjunath

== Production ==
The film’s production faced multiple obstacles. Initially titled Ayodhyapuram, it encountered legal opposition from the Vishwa Hindu Parishad (VHP), which objected to the use of "Ayodhya" due to its religious significance. This led to a title change to Karnataka Ayodhyapuram to appease critics and secure clearance from the Karnataka Film Chamber of Commerce. Director V Lava defended the title as a creative choice, though some speculated it was a publicity stunt. Filming was further delayed by logistical issues, with reports indicating a challenging path to completion. Despite these setbacks, the team announced a release date of 29 November 2013, signaling resolution of earlier disputes.

== Reception ==
Karnataka Ayodhyapuram received mixed reviews. Critics from The New Indian Express described it as a disjointed effort, suggesting that while the premise held promise, the execution faltered with an overload of subplots that diluted the central narrative. The Times of India offered a slightly more favorable take, awarding it a 2.5/5 rating and acknowledging its attempt to merge mythology with modern storytelling, though it criticized the lack of depth in character development. A review in Deccan Herald highlighted the film’s exploration of political undertones intertwined with themes of love, but noted that its ambitious scope sometimes overshadowed its emotional core.
