= Achyuth Kumar =

Indian actor

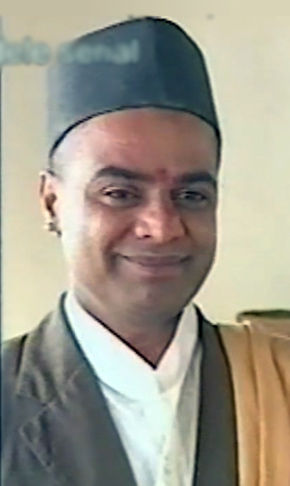
- Achyuth Kumar in 2001 Kannada tele-serial Gruhabhanga
- Born: Tiptur, Tumakuru district, Karnataka, India
- Occupation: Actor
- Years active: 2000–present

Achyuth Kumar is an Indian actor who predominantly works in Kannada cinema, alongside a few Telugu, Tamil and Malayalam films. He is known for his performances in the KGF, Kantara, Sidlingu, and Lucia. He is the recipient of three Filmfare Awards and two Karnataka State Film Awards, one each in Best Supporting Actor and Best Actor categories.

== Career ==
Kumar began acting during his time as a college-going student in Tiptur, Karnataka, along with his theatre groups like Geleyarabalaga, Mungaru Hudugaru and Abhinaya Theatre Group, under the guidance of Nataraj Huliyar. Later, he started his training as an actor at Ninasam. Working in theatre during the time, he was chosen by Girish Kasaravalli to play a pivotal role in his television soap Gruhabhanga in 2000. In the soap Moodala Mane, Kumar played a supportive colleague to the daughter of the protagonist. In Preethi Illada Mele, he played the eldest son of a judge (played by Anant Nag).

Kumar's career in films began in 2007 when he signed to play the father of the female lead in Moggina Manasu (2008) and gangster Oil Kumar in Aa Dinagalu (2007), both Kannada films. He went on to gain a reputation as a character actor and appeared in around 12 films per year. He also appeared in a couple of Tamil films, including Rajinimurugan, playing the father of Keerthy Suresh, and a ardent Rajinikanth fan, but also a lawyer. However, it was in the 2013 film Lucia, that Kumar received widespread appreciation. In the film, he played Shankaranna, a movie theater owner and employer of Nikhil, played by Sathish Ninasam. The performance won him the Filmfare Award for Best Supporting Actor.

In Hejjegalu (2013), Kumar played Kodanda, a gambling addict who squanders money taken on loan, being tried to reform by his young daughter. The performance won him the Karnataka State Film Award for Best Supporting Actor. He received praise for his portrayal of Shivappa, a scavenger in Amaraavati (2017). In Urvi (2017), based on the menace of child trafficking, he played Devarugunda, an influential man who kidnaps women, rapes them and forces them into prostitution. Archana Nathan of The Hindu wrote, "Achutha Kumar performs well, but one wishes that his character had been given some more depth and background."

In the 2022 drama film, Kantara, Kumar played a treacherous feudal lord Devendra Suttooru, scheming to snatch land from the tribal community after appearing to help them. Deccan Herald wrote, "... given how brilliant Achyuth is, the character's sudden switch in the trait is made invisible by his effortless transformation." The New Indian Express termed his performance "powerful".

in 2022, he also played in KGF: Chapter 2, as Gurupandian, a politician belonging to the DYSS party But also one of the antagonists

== Filmography ==
=== Kannada ===
Key
†	Denotes films that have not yet been released

Year	Title	Role	Notes
2003	Mouni	Kamthi	
2003	Hucchana Maduveli Undone Jana	Ramesha	
2004	Bisi Bisi	Dhobi	
2004	Bimba		
2004	Pravaaha	Maara	
2007	Aa Dinagalu	Oil Kumar	
2008	Moggina Manasu	Chanchala's father	
2009	Jhossh		Filmfare Award for Best Supporting Actor – Kannada
2009	Manasaare		
2010	Prithvi	Shanappa	
2010	Naanu Nanna Kanasu	Brijesh Patel	
2010	Krishnan Love Story		
2010	Gubbi		
2010	Beli Mattu Hola		
2011	Veera Bahu		
2011	Puttakkana Highway		
2011	Rajadhani		
2011	Johny Mera Naam Preethi Mera Kaam	Priya's father	
2011	Panchamrutha		
2011	Lifeu Ishtene	Vishal's father	
2011	Manasology	Sihi's father	
2011	Achchu Mechchu	Purushottam	
2011	Aata		
2011	Shyloo		
2012	Shikari	Rama Mitra	
2012	Edegarike	Tukaram Shetty	
2012	Anna Bond		
2012	Kalpana		
2012	Sidlingu	Appaji Gowda	
2012	Nammanna Don		
2012	Dashamukha		
2012	Challenge	Soori	
2012	Drama		
2012	Yaare Koogadali		
2013	Topiwala	Lokayuktha Loki	
2013	Gombegala Love	Panju's father	
2013	Hejjegalu	Kodanda	Karnataka State Film Award for Best Supporting Actor
2013	Bachchan	Sanyappa Gandigi	
2013	Madarangi		
2013	Jinke Mari		
2013	Lucia	Shankaranna	Filmfare Award for Best Supporting Actor – Kannada; Nominated, SIIMA Award Best Actor in a Supporting Role
2013	Dirty Picture: Silk Sakkath Maga		
2013	Jatta		
2013	Sakkare		
2013	Slum	Swamy	
2013	Karnataka Ayodhyapuram		
2013	Advaitha	Harsha	
2014	Dil Rangeela		
2014	Savaal		
2014	Ragini IPS		
2014	Ulidavaru Kandanthe	Balu	
2014	Kwatle Satisha		
2014	Agraja		
2014	Just Love		
2014	Jamboo Savari		
2014	Oggarane	Krishna	
2014	Drishya	Surya Prakash	Filmfare Award for Best Supporting Actor – Kannada
2014	Software Ganda	Vishwanath	
2014	Mr. and Mrs. Ramachari	Shankar	SIIMA Award Best Actor in a Supporting Role
2015	Abhinetri		
2015	Krishna-Leela	Krishna's father	Nominated, IIFA Utsavam Award for Best Performance in a Comic Role
2015	Aatagara	Yashwanth	
2015	Khushi Khushiyagi		
2015	Muddu Manase	Poorvi's father	
2015	Geetha Bangle Store		
2015	Bettanagere	Reddy	
2015	1st Rank Raju	Raju's father	
2015	Rocket		
2015	Sharpshooter		
2015	Prema Pallakki		
2015	Masterpiece	Noor Ahmed	
2016	Maduveya Mamatheya Kareyole	Chandrashekhar Patil	
2016	Ricky	Radha's father	
2016	Devara Naadalli		
2016	Jwalantham		
2016	Nan Love Track		
2016	Kiragoorina Gayyaligalu	Shankarappa	Nominated, Filmfare Award for Best Supporting Actor – Kannada
2016	Half Mentlu		
2016	The Great Story of Sodabuddi		
2016	Mangaata		
2016	Godhi Banna Sadharana Mykattu	Kumar	Nominated, IIFA Utsavam Award for Best Performance in a Comic Role
2016	Jaggu Dada	Uday Naik	
2016	Kotigobba 2	Subha's brother	
2016	July 22, 1947		
2016	Happy Birthday	Veeraswamy	
2016	Lifeu Super		
2016	Sipaayi	Narasimharaju	
2016	Idolle Ramayana		
2016	Badmaash	Rajshekhar	
2016	Naanu Mattu Varalakshmi		
2016	Kirik Party	Ghouse	
2016	Mandya to Mumbai	Ganesh's father	
2017	Srikanta	Prabhu	
2017	Beautiful Manasugalu	Kodanda	Nominated, Filmfare Award for Best Supporting Actor – Kannada
2017	Amaraavati	Shivappa	Karnataka State Film Award for Best Actor
2017	Srinivasa Kalyana	Shivappa	
2017	Urvi	Devergunda	
2017	Raajakumara	Krishna	
2017	Aake	Madan	
2017	Abbara	Mytri Wines Owner	
2017	Mugulu Nage	Achutha	
2017	College Kumar		
2017	Athiratha		
2018	Raju Kannada Medium		
2018	Churikatte	Ravikanth	
2018	Kanaka		
2018	Tagaru		
2018	Johnny Johnny Yes Papa	Priya's father	
2018	Double Engine		
2018	Iruvudellava Bittu		
2018	Thayige Thakka Maga		
2018	K.G.F: Chapter 1	Guru Pandian	Nominated—SIIMA Award or Best Supporting Actor – Kannada
2019	Natasaarvabhowma	Ghanashyam Yadav's guru	
2019	Bell Bottom	Annappa	
2019	Kavaludaari	Kumar / Bablu	
2019	Geetha		
2019	Chambal		
2019	Bramhachari		
2019	Londonalli Lambodhara	Lambodhara's father	
2019	Avane Srimannarayana	Achutha anna	
2020	Kaanadante Maayavadanu	Chiranjeevi	
2020	Mayabazar 2016	Joseph	
2020	Law	Jagadish Prakash	
2020	ACT 1978	Home Minister	
2020	Bheemasena Nalamaharaja	Varadarajan Iyengar	Amazon Prime Video film
2021	Yuvarathnaa	Govind	
2021	Rathnan Prapancha	Basappa	
2021	SriKrishna@gmail.com	Malavika's father	
2021	Govinda Govinda	Seshachala	
2021	Kannadiga	Harigopala	
2021	Rider	Gangadhar	
2021	Love You Rachchu	Achutha	
2022	DNA	Prashanth Gowda	
2022	Selfie Mummy Googl Daddy		
2022	Fourwalls	Shankranna	
2022	Family Pack	Abhi's father	
2022	Trikona	Kodandarama	
2022	K.G.F: Chapter 2	Guru Pandian	
2022	Thurthu Nirgamana		
2022	Dear Vikram	Politician	
2022	Monsoon Raaga	Raju	
2022	Kantara	Devendra Suttooru	Filmfare Award for Best Supporting Actor – Kannada
2022	Triple Riding	Ram's father	
2022	Raymo	Mohana's father	
2023	Kranti	Sadashivayya	
2023	Veeram	Sadashiva	
2023	Gurudev Hoysala	ASI Sampath	
2023	Raghavendra Stores	Kumar	
2023	Siren		
2023	Kousalya Supraja Rama	Sathyanath	
2023	Kshetrapati	Newspaper Publisher	
2023	Sapta Saagaradaache Ello – Side A	Prabhu	
2023	Sapta Saagaradaache Ello – Side B	Prabhu	
2023	Kaatera		
2024	Bachelor Party	Ashwath Narayan	
2024	Kaalapatthar		
2024	Love Li	Dr. Kuamr	
2024	Bagheera	Prabhakar	
2025	Royal	Sudarshan	
2025	Firefly	Murthy	
2025	Bhuvanam Gaganam		
2025	Junior	Vittalachari	
2025	Just Married		
2025	Kantara: Chapter 1	Dalal	Guest appearance
2025	Brat	SI Mahadevaiah	
2025	The Task	Rajesh	
2026	Landlord		
2026	Cult	Madhava’s father	
2026	Alpha		

=== Tamil ===
Year	Title	Role	Notes
2011	Ko	Krishnakumar	
2012	Yaarukku Theriyum	Soori	
2013	Udhayam NH4	Politician	
2014	Poriyaalan	Sundar	
2015	Eetti	Nasoor Meeran	
2016	Rajini Murugan	Neelakandan	
2016	Mudinja Ivana Pudi	Subha's brother	
2017	Vikram Vedha	SP Surendhar	
2019	Adithya Varma	Meera's father	
2020	Soorarai Pottru	Anantha Narayanan	Amazon Prime Video film
2022	Valimai	Kothandam	
2022	Dejavu	Subramani	
2023	Annapoorani	Rangarajan	
2024	Brother	Kumarasamy	
2025	Mask	Radhi's husband	Uncredited role
2026	Sardar 2	Agent Walrus	

=== Telugu ===
Year	Title	Role	Notes
2018	Chalo	Keshava	
2022	Repeat	Subramanyam	Released on Disney+ Hotstar
2024	The Family Star	Politician	
2024	KA	Ranga Rao	
2025	Shashtipoorthi		
2025	Junior	Vittalachari	

=== Malayalam ===
Year	Title	Role	Notes
2013	120 Minutes	Soori	
2023	Dhoomam	CI K. Prakash	
2025	Paathirathri	DYSP Suresh Kumar Menon	
2026	Ananthan Kaadu	Mudaliyar	Bilingual film

=== Tulu ===
- Ekka Saka (2015)

=== Television ===
Year	Title	Role	Language	Note(s)	Ref.
2002	Gruhabhanga	Channigaraya	Kannada	Credited as Achyutha Rao	
2022	9 Hours	Prisoner	Telugu		
