= Mother's Day (disambiguation) =

Mothers' Day is an originally-American annual celebration honouring mothers.

Mothers' Day may also refer to:

== Film and television ==
=== Films ===
- Mother's Day (1948 film), an American short film by James Broughton
- Mother's Day (1980 film), an American slasher film
- Mother's Day (1989 film), an American television crime drama
- Mother's Day (1993 film), an Austrian comedy
- Mother's Day (2010 film), an American horror film and loose remake of the 1980 film
- Mother's Day (2016 film), an American romantic dramedy film
- Mother's Day (2016 film), a Polish action thriller film

=== Television episodes ===
- "Mother's Day" (Courage the Cowardly Dog), 1999
- "Mothers Day" (Drop Dead Diva), 2011
- "Mother's Day" (Futurama), 2000
- "Mother's Day" (General Hospital: Night Shift), 2007
- "Mother's Day" (Kim Possible), 2004
- "Mother's Day" (Law & Order), 2003
- "Mother's Day" (Lucky Feller), 1976
- "Mother's Day" (The Middle), 2010
- "Mother's Day" (Modern Family), 2011
- "Mother's Day" (Orange Is the New Black), 2015
- "Mother's Day" (Pose), 2018
- "Mother's Day" (Raising Hope), 2013
- "Mother's Day" (Rugrats), 1997
- "Mother's Day" (Trophy Wife), 2014
- "Mother's Day" (Rosie and Jim), 2000

== Other uses ==
- Mother's Day, a 2000 play by Jeff Baron
- Mother's Day, a 1950 play by J. B. Priestley
- "Mother's Day", a song by Blink-182 from Take Off Your Pants and Jacket
- "Mother's Day", a song by Nada Surf from The Proximity Effect
- Mother's Day, a fictional town in the 1988 video game Mother

== See also ==
- Mothering Sunday, a Christian holiday in Europe on the 4th Sunday in Lent
- Parents' Day
- Fathers' Day (disambiguation)
