= Keratam =

2011 Telugu and Tamil film

- Film poster
- Directed by: Gautham Patnaik; R. N. Saran
- Produced by: S. V. Babu
- Starring: Siddharth Rajkumar; Aishwarya Devan; Rakul Preet Singh
- Cinematography: A. Venkatesh
- Edited by: Suresh Urs
- Music by: Joshua Sridhar
- Production company: SV Productions
- Release date: 26 August 2011
- Country: India
- Languages: Telugu; Tamil

Keratam (transl. Wave) is a 2011 Indian Telugu-language coming-of-age drama film directed by Gautham Patnaik and produced by S. V. Babu. The film was simultaneously made in Tamil as Yuvan by director R. N. Saran. The film stars Siddharth Rajkumar, Aishwarya Devan and Rakul Preet Singh in the lead roles. A remake of the Kannada film Jhossh (2009), the films featured music composed by Joshua Sridhar and were released in August 2011. The bilingual version had Aishwarya Devan and Rakul Preet Singh making her Telugu and Tamil language debuts respectively.

== Plot ==
Siddhartha "Siddhu" / Bala is the son of an honest government employee. He has seven friends and lives a happy life. Siddhu / Bala and his friends complete their HSE and join the college. As they grow up, Siddhu develops feelings towards Geetha / Meena. Siddhu / Bala clashes with a senior student, "Robo", because of the latter teasing and harassing Geetha / Meena. During a fight with Robo, Geetha / Meena and Siddhu / Bala's parents learn about their feelings.

The friends warn Siddhu / Bala to forget his love and focus on his career, but he ignores them. They desert him, and Geetha / Meena also listens to her parents and decides to focus on her studies and become a doctor. At this point, Siddhu's father retires and agrees to pay a bribe to get Siddhu / Bala a government job. However, Siddhu / Bala fails to turn up to the interview and loses the job. Siddhu / Bala behaves harshly with his father, which leads to him being thrown out of the house.

Siddhu / Bala falls in love with Sangeetha / Meera and proposes, but she rejects him. He realizes he made a mistake by abandoning his career, as his love was an infatuation. Siddhu / Bala learns that his friends have become the best achievers and are invited to their college function. Siddhu / Bala arrives onstage, giving a speech about how not to become like him and also promises his parents he will take care of them. Siddhu's / Bala's friends reconcile with him and encourage him to achieve something in life.

== Cast ==
Cast (Telugu)	Cast (Tamil)	Role (Telugu)	Role (Tamil)
Siddharth Rajkumar		Siddharth "Siddhu"	Bala
Aishwarya Devan		Geetha	Meena
Rakul Preet Singh		Sangeetha	Meera
Yamuna		Sharadhamma (Note: Full name only mentioned in Tamil version.)	Sharadhamma
Bhimaneni Srinivasa Rao		Siddhu's father	Bala's father
Srinath		Geetha's father	Meena's father
Kavitha		Lakshmi (Note: Full name only mentioned in Telugu version.)	Lakshmi
Suman		Ravishankar	Ravishankar
Venu Madhav	Lollu Sabha Jeeva	PT Teacher	PT Teacher
Pandu		Bikshapati	Avudaiyappan
Livingston		Mohan Rao	Jeevanantham
All Ok		Alok	Bunty
Sihi Kahi Chandru		College Principal	College Principal
Robot Ganesh		Robo	Robo
Papa Pandu Chidanand		College Lecturer	College Lecturer
R. G. Vijayasarathy		Alok's father	Bunty's father

== Production ==
A remake of the Kannada film Jhossh (2009), the bilingual Telugu and Tamil project was launched by Kannada producer S. V. Babu. It marked the acting debut of Siddharth Rajkumar, a nephew of actor Krishnam Raju and a cousin of Prabhas. The film also marked the debut of actresses Rakul Preet Singh and Aishwarya Devan in the Tamil and Telugu film industries, and it became the first project the actresses had signed in either language. According to Siddharth Rajkumar, a Malayalam version was also planned.

The Telugu version of the film was directed by Gautham Patnaik, the brother of renowned music composer R. P. Patnaik. The director of the original Kannada film, Shivamani, was approached to make the Tamil version but his refusal meant that newcomer R. N. Saran worked on the project. Both versions of the film had been shot in Hyderabad, Bangalore, Chennai and Goa. A song for both versions of the film (titled "Nidure Chedire" in Telugu and "Kan Paartha Neram" in Tamil) was shot in a secluded area of Goa, where the team of Ek Duuje Ke Liye (1981) had earlier shot. Production for the film was completed by June 2011.

== Soundtrack ==
Songs composed by Joshua Sridhar. The song "Thanthane Thananthane" from the original was reused as "Nee Navvula" / "Kan Paartha Neram".

Keratam

- "Sometimes Nelapaina" - Vijay Prakash, SuVi, Vijay Narayan, Rita
- "Saadhyamena" - Karthik, Shweta Mohan
- "Hey! Oka Merupai" - Benny Dayal
- "Vayase Nidura" - Naresh Iyer, Padmapriya
- "Nidure Chedire" - Karthik
- "Fashion Show" - Vijay Narayan, Rita
- "Nee Navvula" - Deepu, Gayathri

Yuvan

Lyrics by Viveka and Kabilan.

- "Thear Ival Eval Kattumum" - Benny Dayal
- "Vanmegam Enn Vazhili" - Karthik, Shweta Menon
- "Nilave Naanum" - Naresh Iyer, Padmapriya
- "Kan Paartha Neram" - Karthik
- "Fashion Show" - Vijay Narayan, Rita
- "Nizhalum Tholaivil" - Karthik
- "Sollu Petchu Ketka" - Vijay Prakash, Rita, Vijay Narayan

== Reception ==
Regarding the Telugu version, a reviewer from The Hindu noting that "The film has been handled well but is very formulaic." Regarding the Tamil version, a critic from Dinamalar praised the film's intent while calling the film's comedy scenes a minus point.
