= College Kumar (2017 film) =

2017 film by Santhu

- Directed by: Hari Santhosh
- Written by: Santhu; Maasthi Upparahalli
- Screenplay by: Hari Santhosh
- Story by: Hari Santhosh
- Produced by: L. Padmanabha
- Starring: Vicky Varun; Samyuktha Hegde; P. Ravishankar; Shruti
- Cinematography: Thamizh Azhagan
- Edited by: K. M. Prakash
- Music by: Arjun Janya
- Production company: M. R. Pictures
- Distributed by: Mysore Talkies
- Release date: 10 November 2017
- Country: India
- Language: Kannada

College Kumar is a 2017 Indian Kannada- language comedy drama film written and directed by Hari Santhosh. It stars Vikky Varun and Samyuktha Hegde, with P. Ravishankar, Shruti and Achyuth Kumar in supporting roles. The score and soundtrack for the film are by Arjun Janya and the cinematography is by A. Azhagan.

The film was released on 10 November 2017. The film got positive response all over. Performances of Ravishankar and Shruti were praised by critics and audience alike. The film was remade by the director in Telugu and Tamil in 2020 with the same title.

== Cast ==
- Vikky Varun as Kumar
- Samyuktha Hegde as Keerti
- P. Ravishankar as Shivakumar, Kumar's father
- Shruti as Girija, Kumar's mother
- Achyuth Kumar, Keerthi's father
- K S Suchitra as Keerthi's mother
- Sadhu Kokila as Nani, Shivakumar and Kumar's friend
- Prakash Belawadi as Shivakumar's Boss in Audit Office
- Rockline Sudhakar as Sudhakar, Employee in Audit Office
- Sundar Raj as College Principal
- Bhargavi Narayan
- Ashwin Rao Pallakki
- Prashanth Siddi
- Vijay Koundinya
- Mandya Jayaram
- M. N. Suresh
- Ramesh Pandith as College Lecturer
- Sunethra Pandith as College Lecturer
- Ganesh Rao Kesarkar
- Honnavalli Krishna
- Dingri Nagaraj

== Soundtrack ==
College Kumar

Soundtrack album by Arjun Janya
- Genre: Feature film soundtrack
- Language: Kannada
- Label: Jhankar Music
- Producer: Arjun Janya

The film's background score and the soundtracks are composed by Arjun Janya. The music rights were acquired by Jhankar Music.

Tracklist
No.	Title	Lyrics	Singer(s)	Length
1.	"Naavu Last Bench"	Hari Santhosh	Alok R. Babu, Vasuki Vaibhav, Vyasaraj	03:14
2.	"Hasi Bisi"	Jayanth Kaikini	Swetha Mohan	04:22
3.	"Marali Marali"	Hari Santhosh	Sanjith Hegde	04:05
4.	"Nanna Kuse"	V. Nagendra Prasad	Nithin Rajaram Shastry	05:32

== Reception ==
A critic from The Times of India wrote that "This is a film that parents and children could watch together — it sort of paints a picture of what is the norm in many families". A critic from Bangalore Mirror wrote that "The director has reinvented himself with College Kumar, which is a safe bet for the audience". A critic from Deccan Chronicle wrote that "without an iota of doubt it is certainly a bearable movie which has some true emotional moments to watch out for.
