= Lanke (film) =

2021 Indian film

- Directed by: Ram Prasad
- Produced by: Patel Srinivas and Surekha Ram Prasad
- Starring: Yogesh; Kavya Shetty; Sanchari Vijay; Krishi Thapanda
- Cinematography: Ramesh Babu
- Music by: Karthik Sharma
- Production company: The Great Entertainers
- Release date: 10 September 2021
- Running time: 2h 12min
- Country: India
- Language: Kannada

Lanke is a 2021 Indian Kannada-language action drama film directed by Ram Prasad and produced by Patel Srinivas and Surekha Ram Prasad. The film starring Yogesh, Kavya Shetty, Sanchari Vijay, Krishi Thapanda and Ester Noronha are in the lead roles. The plot of the film is adaptation of Ramayana in modern times. The music for the film is scored by Karthik Sharma and cinematography is done by Ramesh Babu.

== Cast ==
- Yogesh as Ram
- Kavya Shetty as Mandara
- Sanchari Vijay
- Krishi Thapanda as Paavani
- Ester Noronha
- Gayatri Jayaraman
- Suchendra Prasad
