= Krishi Thapanda =

Indian Kannada cinema actor

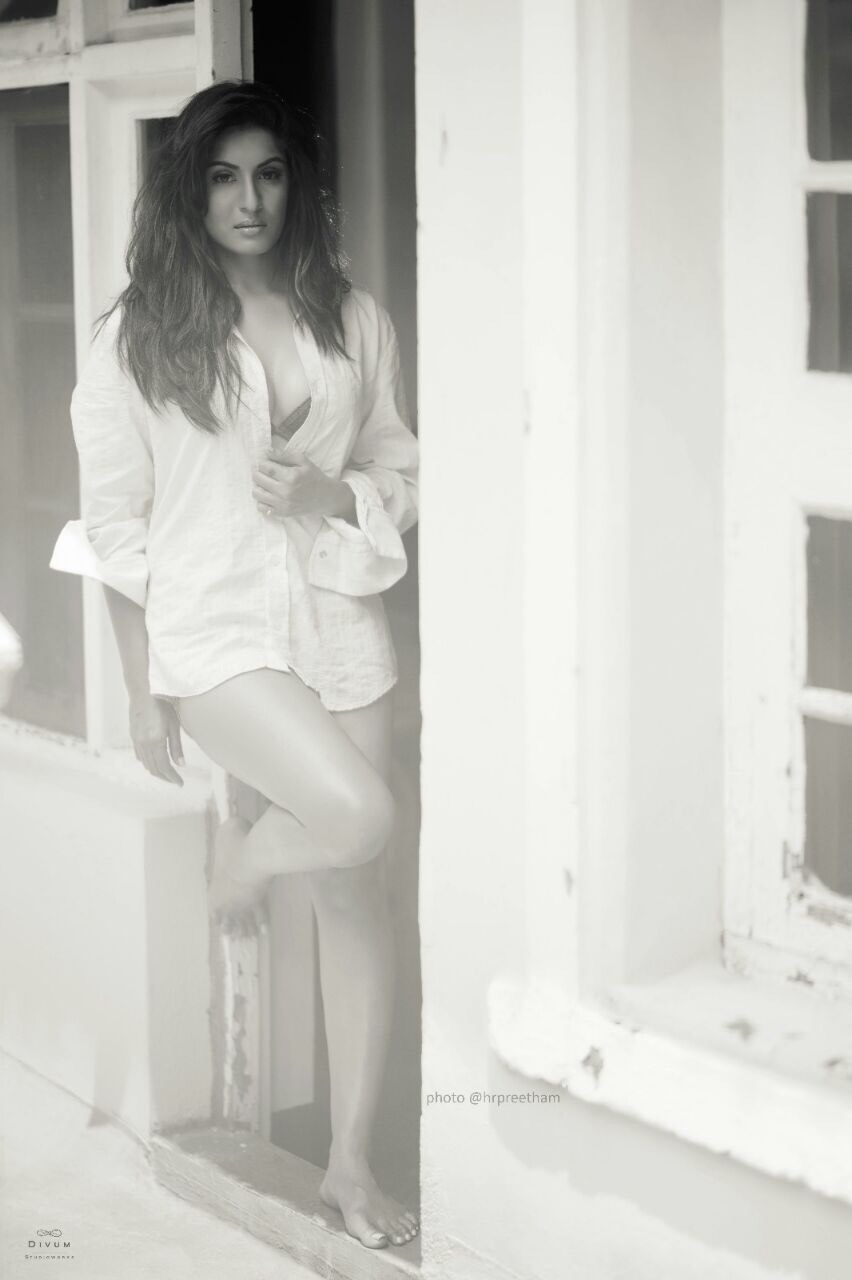
- Thapanda in 2018
- Born: 23 September 1989 (age 36); Coorg, Karnataka, India
- Occupations: Model, actress
- Years active: 2014–present

Krishi Thapanda is an Indian actress and model. She works in Kannada cinema. She debuted in 2016 film Akira, for which she was nominated for 2016 SIIMA Awards for best debutant actress.

She was crowned Miss Karnataka 2014. Thapanda was a participant of Bigg Boss Season 5, on Colors Super. She was eliminated in the 12th week, but appeared a couple of times as a wild card entrant.

== Early life ==
Thapanda was born into a Kodava family hailing from Coorg.

== Career ==
Prior to modelling and films, Thapanda worked as an assistant manager at InterCall, an audio conference and meeting services provider based in the US. While working for InterCall, Thapanda was offered a Kannada film Kahi. This released in November 2016.

While Thapanda began shooting Kahi first, Akira released first. Akira is a Kannada Rom-Com that was released in May 2016. Thapanda played Lavanya, a film director who returned from the US and falls in love with Akira. Akira was directed by Naveen Reddy. Kahi was directed by Arvind Sastry. Kahi was critically acclaimed and won the 2016 Karnataka State Award for Best Screenplay. She worked on a Tamil film Nae, which remains unreleased.

Thapanda acted in Eradu Kanasa with Vijay Raghavendra and Karunya Ram in the lead. This released in March 2017 and was directed by Madan.

In July 2018, she appeared in Kannadakkagi Ondannu Otthi, where she plays Pramaya. It was directed by Kushal Gowda. She plays opposite Shatamarshan Avinash.

== Filmography ==
Year	Film	Role	Notes
2016	Akira	Lavanya	Nominated – SIIMA Award for Best Debut Actress
2016	Kahi	Teacher	
2017	Eradu Kanasu		
2018	Ira		
2018	Kannadakkaagi Ondannu Otti	Prameya	
2019	Bharaate		
2021	Lanke	Paavani	
2025	Gana		
