= All Ok =

All Ok (Alok Babu R)
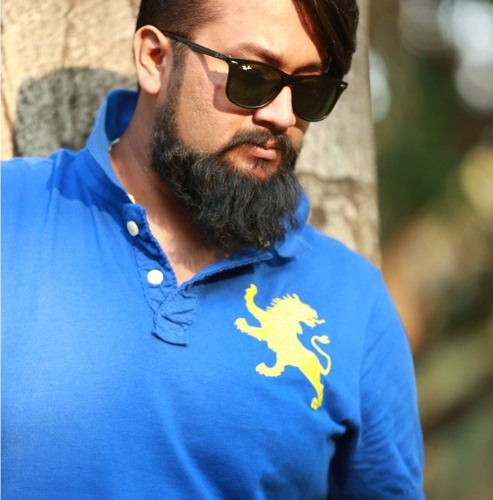

Background information
- Born: 2 May 1989 (age 37); Bengaluru
- Genres: Pop rap, Electronic dance music, trap
- Occupations: Actor; singer; rapper; director; producer
- Years active: 2012–present
- Labels: Team AllOk, Believe Digital
- Website: https://allok.co.in/

Alok R. Babu (born 2 May 1989), known as All Ok, is an Indian Kannada rapper, singer, actor & music-producer. He is known for Kannada rap songs like Don't Worry, Yaakinge, Happy, Nan Kannadiga, Deja Vu, Urban Lads and many more.

== Personal life ==
Alok Babu was born on May 2, 1989 to Ramesh Babu and Tara Ramesh. He has a younger sister. He completed his PUC in Sri Bhagawan Mahaveer Jain College, Jayanagar, and later pursued his BBM degree from City college of management studies at Bengaluru. He produced the Kannada's first rap song, 'Young Engo'. Ever since, All OK produced new talents of Kannada Hip-Hop.

He married Nisha Natarajan in November 2019.

== Career ==
He started his career as lead singer in Kannada's first hip-hop band & album 'Urban lads' and acted as one of the lead for Kannada hit movie Jhossh. Since then he has acted in more than twenty five movies in five different languages and has composed, directed and produced many independent music videos which have been well received by the audience.

All Ok's one of famous tracks, 'Don't Worry', was played and appreciated at BBC Radio London hosted by the popular RJ Ashanti Omkar. In addition, All OK's Don't Worry, was featured on Rolling Stone India.

== Filmography ==
Year	Film	Role	Notes	Ref.
2009	Jhossh	Alok		
2010	Aithalakkadi			
2011	Keratam	Alok	Telugu-Tamil bilingual film	
2011	Yuvan	Bunty	Telugu-Tamil bilingual film	
2013	Mandahasa			
2014	Ninnindale			
2014	Gajakesari			
2015	Siddhartha	Tsunami		
2017	Pataki	Police Inspector		
2017	Tarak			
2019	Bharaate	Rajasthan Guide		
2019	Sarvajanikarige Suvarnavakasha			
2022	Raymo	Himself	Cameo appearance	
2026	Father's Day			
