= Jhossh =

- VCD cover
- Directed by: Shivamani
- Written by: Shivamani; B. A. Madhu (dialogue)
- Produced by: S. Sanjay Babu
- Starring: Rakesh Adiga; Poorna; Nithya
- Cinematography: Santhosh Rai Pathaje
- Edited by: K. M. Prakash
- Music by: Vardhan
- Production company: SVP Pictures
- Release date: 10 April 2009
- Running time: 165 minutes
- Country: India
- Language: Kannada

Josh is a 2009 Indian Kannada-language romance film directed and written by Shivamani. Produced by Sanjay Babu under SVP pictures, the film mainly stars debutant Rakesh Adiga, Shamna Kasim and Nithya, whilst Akshay, Vishnu Prasanna, Dwarakish, Achyuth Kumar, Tulasi Shivamani and Sihi Kahi Chandru feature in supporting roles. The music is composed by Vardhan, making his debut.

The film was released on 10 April 2009 across Karnataka and went on to become one of the highest grossers at the box-collection for the year. The film had a run over a hundred days at cinema halls. The film was remade in Telugu and Tamil as Keratam and Yuvan, respectively.

== Plot ==
Rakesh "Rocky" is the son of an honest government employee. He has seven friends and lives a happy life. Rocky and his friends complete their PUC and join the college. As they grow up, Rocky develops feelings towards Meena. Rocky clashes with a senior student, "Robo", because of the latter teasing and harassing Meena. During a fight with Robo, Meena and Rocky's parents learn about their feelings.

The friends warn Rocky to forget his love and focus on his career, but he ignores them. They desert him, and Meena also listens to her parents and decides to focus on her studies and become a doctor. At this point, Rocky's father retires and agrees to pay a bribe to get Rocky a government job. However, Rocky fails to turn up to the interview and loses the job. Rocky behaves harshly with his father, which leads to him being thrown out of the house.

Rocky falls in love with Meera and proposes, but she rejects him. He realizes he made a mistake by abandoning his career, as his love was an infatuation. Rocky learns that his friends have become the best achievers and are invited to their college function. Rocky arrives onstage, giving a speech about how not to become like him and also promises his parents he will take care of them. Rocky's friends reconcile with him and encourage him to achieve something in life.

== Cast ==
- Rakesh Adiga as Rakesh a.k.a. Rocky
- Poorna as Meena
- Nithya as Meera
- Vishnu Prasanna as Vishnu
- Akshay as Akshay
- Alok Babu as Alok
- Amith as Rocky's friend
- Robo Ganesh as Robo
- Sharan as PT teacher
- Sihi Kahi Chandru as School principal
- Tulasi Shivamani as Sharadamma Rakesh's mother
- Achyuth Kumar as Rakesh's father
- Srinivas Prabhu as Meena's father
- Shivaji Rao Jadhav as Barber jagan's father
- Sudha Belawadi as Meena's mother
- Srinath as Meera's father
- Chidanand as Social Studies teacher
- Karibasavaiah as Akshay's father
- Tabla Nani as Lecturer Nani
- Jaganath Chandrashekhar as Rocky's friend

== Soundtrack ==
Jhossh

Soundtrack album by Vardhan
- Released: 22 March 2009
- Genre: Film soundtrack
- Label: Anand Audio
- Producer: Vardhan

All the songs are composed by Vardhan. The song "Jothe Jotheyali" was reused from Geetha (1981). Karthik Srinivasan of Milliblog! wrote that "Jhossh isn't one of the better soundtracks in Kannada this year - far from it. But, there is a fairly new sound - a la Telugu - that composer Vardhan ushers with the songs that is refreshing".

Track listing
No.	Title	Lyrics	Singer(s)	Length
1.	"Hey Maga"	V. Nagendra Prasad	Ranjith
2.	"Thanthane Thananthane"	Kaviraj	Karthik	4:54
3.	"Jothe Jotheyali"	Kaviraj	S. P. Balasubrahmanyam, S. Janaki, Anuradha Bhat, Harsha
4.	"Namaskara Sir"	Kaviraj	Anoop, Harsha, Chinmayi
5.	"Shakalaka Rock N Roll"	Kaviraj	Vardhan, Bhargavi Pillai
6.	"Yeh Mera Bharat Mahan"	Kaviraj	Vardhan, Harsha, Chaitra H. G., Anuradha Bhat

== Reception ==
A critic from Sify opined that "Student and parents should watch this film without fail". R. G. Vijayasarathy of Rediff.com wrote that "Jhossh is a technically brilliant film with absolutely top class performances and good narration. This is film that needs to be encouraged". A critic from The Times of India wrote that "It is a must-see for teenagers, with the director excellently combining ragging, drag-racing, fighting, love, hatred, sentiment and family problems with a lively message". A critic from Bangalore Mirror wrote that "It is to Shivamani's credit that his choice of actors and ability to extract work has succeeded. Jhossh is a film parents would want to take their children along". Vijayasarathy writing for IANS wrote that "Jhossh is certainly one of the best original films released in recent days. It is certainly a benchmark for youth oriented films in Kannada. The film has all the elements to attract a large audience".

== Awards and nominations ==
List of awards and nominations
Year	Award	Category	Recipient / Nominee	Result	Ref.
2008–09	Karnataka State Film Awards	Second Best Film	S. Sanjay Babu	Won	
2009	57th Filmfare Awards South	Best Supporting Actor	Achyuth Kumar	Won	
2009	57th Filmfare Awards South	Best Supporting Actress	Tulasi Shivamani	Won	
2009	57th Filmfare Awards South	Best Film	Jhossh	Nominated	
2009	57th Filmfare Awards South	Best Director	Shivamani	Nominated	
2009	57th Filmfare Awards South	Best Supporting Actor	Sharan	Nominated	
2009	57th Filmfare Awards South	Best Supporting Actress	Nithya Menen	Nominated	
2009	57th Filmfare Awards South	Best Lyricist	Kaviraj	Nominated	
2010	Suvarna Film Awards	Best Director	Shivamani	Won	
2010	Suvarna Film Awards	Best Film	Josh	Won	
2010	Suvarna Film Awards	Best Debut Actor	Rakesh Adiga	Won	
