= College Kumar (2020 film) =

2020 Indian film by Hari Santhosh

- Theatrical release poster in Telugu
- Directed by: Hari Santhosh
- Written by: Vidhyadharan (Tamil dialogues)
- Screenplay by: Hari Santhosh
- Based on: College Kumar by Santhu
- Produced by: L. Padmanabha
- Starring: Rajendra Prasad (Telugu); Prabhu (Tamil); Rahul Vijay; Priya Vadlamani; Madhoo
- Cinematography: Guru Prashanth Rai
- Edited by: Garry BH (Telugu); K. Pavan Kalyan (Telugu); K. M. Prakash (Tamil)
- Music by: Qutub-E-Kripa
- Production company: M. R. Pictures
- Release date: 6 March 2020
- Country: India
- Languages: Telugu; Tamil

College Kumar is a 2020 Indian comedy film written and directed by Hari Santhosh. A remake of his 2017 Kannada film of the same name, it was simultaneously shot in Telugu and Tamil languages, with Rajendra Prasad starring in Telugu and Prabhu in Tamil. Rahul Vijay, Priya Vadlamani and Madhoo co-star in both versions. College Kumar was released on 6 March 2020 in both languages.

== Cast ==
- Rajendra Prasad (Telugu) / Prabhu (Tamil) as Sasi Kumar (Telugu) / Thiru Kumaran (Tamil)
- Rahul Vijay as Shiva Kumar
- Priya Vadlamani as Avantika
- Madhoo as Janaki
- Nassar as Santhosh Kumar G.
- Manobala as K. Murthy
- Chaams as Swami
- Sebastian as Shiva's friend
- Avinash as Madhava Rao (Telugu) / Kaliyamurthy (Tamil)
- Anchor Roshan as Kishore Kumar
- Kote Prabhakar
- Ganesh Rao Kesarkar as Ravana (Telugu) / Ravanan (Tamil)
- M. N. Suresh as Canteen worker

== Production ==
In April 2019, it was reported that the Kannada film College Kumar would be remade in Telugu and Tamil and languages, with both versions being shot simultaneously. Hari Santhosh was confirmed to be directing both remakes, while the producers of the original too would be retained. Principal photography began in the same month. Though the cast was largely the same in both versions, Rajendra Prasad was exclusive to the Telugu version and Prabhu to Tamil. It was also the Tamil cinema debuts of Rahul Vijay and Priya Vadlamani.

== Themes ==
Hari Santhosh has stated that, through College Kumar, he intends to convey the message that "it's never too late to learn."

== Soundtrack ==
The soundtrack was composed by Qutub-E-Kripa. It was released via Sony Music India.

Telugu
No.	Title	Lyrics	Singer(s)	Length
1.	"College Kumar"	Sri Mani	Anurag Kulkarni	4:31
2.	"Allade Allade"	Kittu Vissapragada	Anurag Kulkarni	3:08
3.	"Baari Baari"	Sri Mani	Haricharan Seshadri, Abhijith Rao	4:03
4.	"Kanulaaraa"	Kittu Vissapragada	Sathya Prakash	3:40
5.	"Kannule Daate"	Kittu Vissapragada	Santhosh Dhayanidhi	3:52

Tamil
No.	Title	Lyrics	Singer(s)	Length
1.	"College Kumar"	Arivu	Nakul Abhyankar, Anthony Daasan	4:30
2.	"Arrathi"	Mohan Raj	A. H. Kaashif, G. V. Prakash Kumar	3:07
3.	"Baari Baari"	Arivu	Pavan, Haricharan, Abhijith Rao	4:02
4.	"Needhan En Ulagam"	Mohan Raj	A. H. Kaashif, Nithin Rajaram Shastry	3:40
5.	"Kelumbudaa Nanbaa"	Mohan Raj	Santhosh Dhayanidhi, Yazin Nizar	3:51

== Release and reception ==
College Kumar was released on 6 March 2020 in both Telugu and Tamil versions. Reviewing the Telugu version, Neeshita Nyayapati of The Times of India rated it 2 stars out of 5, praising the premise but criticised its execution, saying it "makes it seem like leftover material from the 90s or early 2000s." Reviewing the Tamil version, Thinkal Menon of The Times of India also rated it 2 stars out of 5, saying, "College Kumar has the issues which most of the remake versions suffer. The project, which has been made simultaneously in [Telugu] as well, looks like a Telugu film in many scenes, thanks to the location and artistes who play the minor supporting roles." Maalai Malar reviewed the Tamil version more positively, praising its comedy.
