= Rakesh Adiga =

Indian Kannada film actor

- Born: 7 June 1986 (age 40); Bangalore, Karnataka, India
- Education: Carmel English School, Padmanabhanagar
- Occupation: Actor
- Years active: 2009–present

Rakesh Adiga (born 7 June 1986) is an Indian actor, who works in the Kannada film industry. He was introduced to the film industry through the film Jhoshh in 2009. He attended high school in Janaseva Vidya Kendra residential school, Bangalore. He is also the first Kannada rapper, he started a Kannada hip-hop band with a few of his friends, which was produced by Suraj Sarja, called "Urban Lads". He also participated in Bigg Boss Kannada OTT Season 1 and Bigg Boss kannada season 9 and became 1st Runner-up of the show.

== Acting career ==
Rakesh got his first break in his debut film Jhossh, which released in 2009. The film went on to become one of the top grossers of that year and earned him good recognition. He also won Best debut actor award for Asianet Suvarna for that year. This was followed by a brief break. In 2010, he starred in a romantic film Mandahasa, which underwent much delay in release. He was next noted in Alemari (2011), where he played a villain role. He was also seen in Manasology in the same year. Subsequently, he starred as a lead actor in Parie (2012), which boasted of big names associated with it. However, the film was a failure at the box office.

== Filmography ==
Year	Film	Role	Notes
2009	Jhossh	Rocky / Rakesh	Winner, Suvarna Film Award for Best Debut Actor
2011	Manasology	Manas	
2012	Alemari	Nimhans Suri	
2012	Parie	Bharadwaj	
2012	Yaare Koogadali		Special Appearance
2013	Nanda Gokula	Murari	
2013	Mandahasa	Aditya	
2014	Karnataka Ayodhyapuram		
2015	Kotigond Love Story	Rakesh	
2015	Preethiyinda	Karthik	
2015	Dove	Kumar	
2016	Mandya to Mumbai	Ganesh	
2018	Raja Loves Radhe	Rocky	
2019	Night Out	—N/a	Director
2024	Maryade Prashne	Suri	
2025	Naanu Matthu Gunda 2	Shankara	
2026	Landlord		
TBA	Notorious †		Delayed

As playback singer

- Dosti (2014)

=== Television ===
Year	Film	Role	Notes
2022	Bigg Boss Kannada	Contestant	Runner-up; season 9
2022	Bigg Boss OTT	Contestant	
