= Father's Day (2026 film) =

2026 Indian Kannada language film

- Directed by: Rajaram Rajendran
- Written by: Rajaram Rajendran
- Starring: Harshil Koushik; Samragni Rajan
- Cinematography: Rajaram Rajendran
- Edited by: Jyolsna Panicker
- Music by: Joe Panicker
- Production company: Eleven Elements
- Release date: 17 July 2026
- Country: India
- Language: Kannada

Father's Day is a 2026 Indian Kannada language film directed by Rajaram Rajendran. The film stars Harshil Koushik, and Samragni Rajan in the lead roles.

== Cast ==
- Harshil Koushik as Sushant
- Samragni Rajan as Sudheer
- All Ok
- Arun Ramdas
- Samragni Rajan

== Reception ==
A. Sharadhaa of the Cinema Express said that "Father's Day is about the complicated, imperfect, and human idea of fatherhood. Instead, it leaves you with a thought worth carrying home: perhaps not every father has to become a hero. Sometimes, becoming a friend is enough." Susmita Sameera of The Times of India said that "Father's Day asks for patience but rewards it with a thoughtful, emotionally resonant story about forgiveness, identity, and the desire to reconnect. Its heartfelt performances, grounded storytelling, and quiet emotional honesty make it a refreshing and memorable cinematic experience." Nikhil Waiker of the Deccan Herald said that "While Father's Day attempts to build a reflective road story, it ends up spinning its wheels. The lack of narrative direction and emotional payoff leaves it feeling like a journey that ultimately goes nowhere." Maheswara Reddy of the Bangalore Mirror said that "Overall, the film successfully captures the nuance of father-son dynamics with maturity and warmth. It is a heartwarming journey that lovers of slice-of-life cinema should not miss."
