= Kavya Ajit =

Indian playback singer

Kavya Ajit കാവ്യ അജിത്
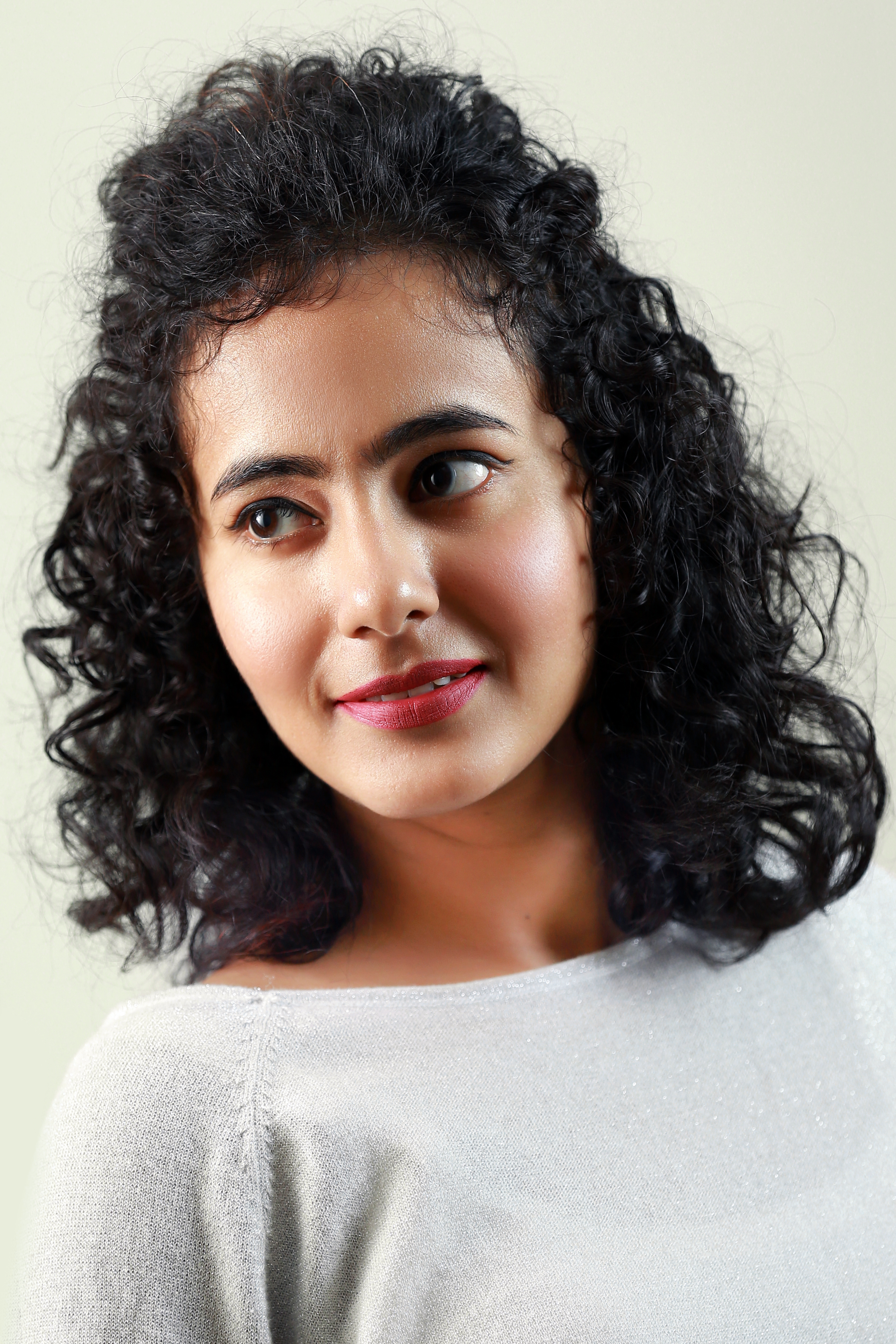

Background information
- Born: Kavya Ajit; 17 July 1991 (age 35); Kozhikode, Kerala, India
- Genres: Indian classical music; pop; filmi; playback singing
- Occupations: Playback singer; violinist
- Instruments: Vocals; violin
- Years active: 2014–present

Kavya Ajit (born 17 July 1991) is an Indian singer, violinist and a live performer born in Kozhikode, Kerala. Apart from Malayalam, she has recorded songs in many Indian languages including Tamil, Telugu and Kannada. Having trained in Carnatic Classical Music and Western classical style of Violin, she has performed in concerts and stage shows across the world.

== Early life and education ==
Kavya was born on 17 July 1991 in Kozhikode to Dr. Ajit Bhaskar and Dr. Lakshmi S, a professor of gynaecology. She learnt the basics of Carnatic Music from her grandmother Kamala Subrahmaniam, former All India Radio artiste and continued further education after moving to Chennai.

She attended Presentation Higher Secondary School in Kozhikode. She completed a degree in computer science engineering and worked as a software engineer before shifting to a full-time career in music. She is married to Vidhyasagar Venkatesan and they have a daughter, Lakshya. The family resides in Chennai.

== Career ==
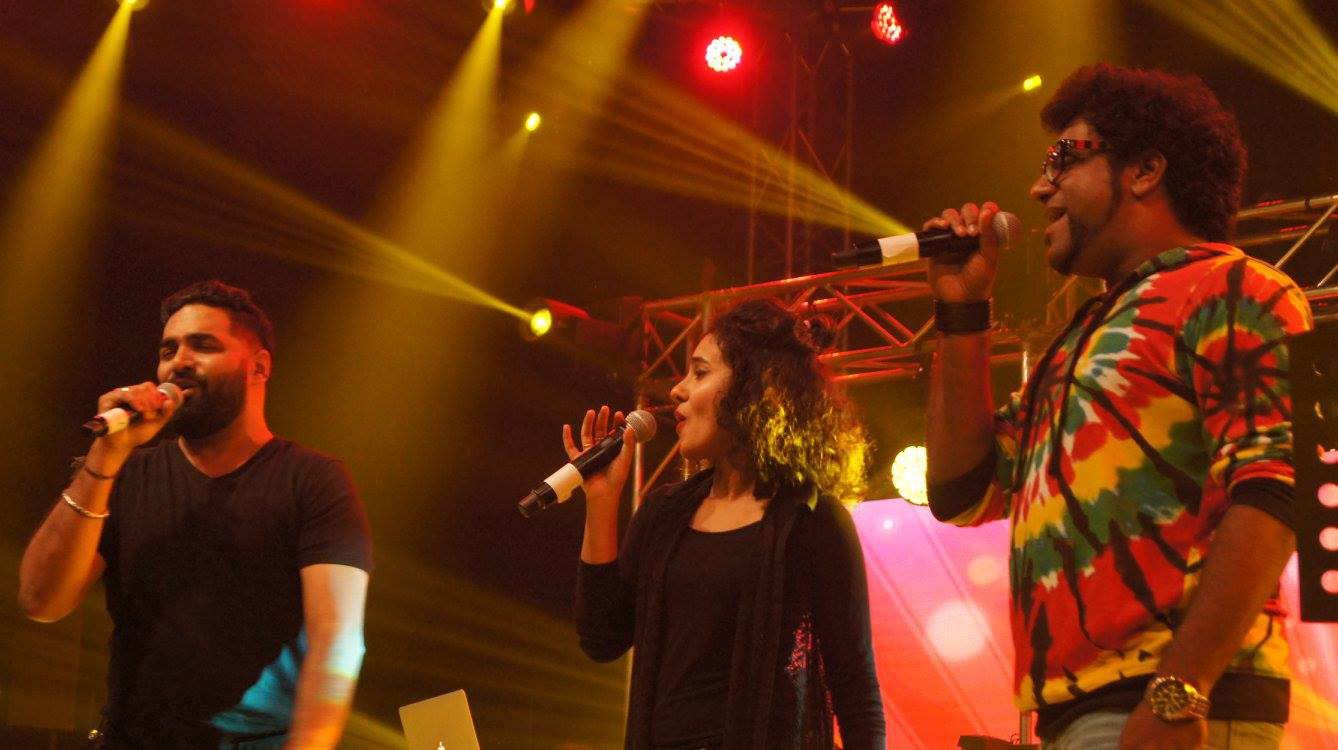
Kavya Ajit with Gopi Sundar and Haricharan during Band Big G live performance at Dubai

Kavya stepped into music scene in 2014 with the Ranjan Pramod's romantic musical Rose Guitarinaal. The film's music composer Shahbaz Aman, who was in search for a new voice, liked hers and offered her the song Engum Nalla Pookkal which became her first breakthrough. It was followed by a string of songs tuned by Shaan Rahman for the films Praise the Lord, Oru Vadakkan Selfie and Nam Duniya Nam Style which was her Kannada debut. She was next heard in Lavender, composed by Deepak Dev where she performed two tracks for the film. The soundtrack was lauded for Dev's combination of western music and old-world lyrics.

She debuted in Tamil film music industry through the song Hey Umayaal for the film Urumeen scored by Achu Rajamani.

Her first taste of success came after singing Neeyen Kaataai from the film Jo and the Boy, composed by Rahul Subrahmanian. She received wider recognition following the release of the breezy melody Ee Shishirakalam, tuned by Shaan Rahman for the film Jacobinte Swargarajyam. The song was an instant hit and was praised by critics and audiences alike. In 2016, she made her Telugu debut through the song Jakkanna from the eponymous film. The track was lauded for its grooviness.

In 2017, she lent her vocals for Gopi Sundar's composition Chekkanum Pennum for Omar's second film Chunkzz followed by Agnijwalaa from the Bollywood film Mom for A.R Rahman's Malayalam soundtrack album.

Kavya has performed at numerous Carnatic concerts, Western Vocal and Violin gigs and has shared stage with various artists like A.R Rahman, Karthik, Vijay Prakash, Naresh Iyer, Vineeth Sreenivasan, Stephan Devassy, Shaan Rahman and Gopi Sundar as part of various TV music shows and live performances. She has sung various commercial jingles and has collaborated with artists like Vishal Chandrasekhar, Siddharth Menon, Justin Prabhakaran and Madley Blues for their albums and singles.

== Discography ==
Year	Film	Song	Composer	Language	Ref
2013	Rose Guitarinaal	Engum Nalla Pookkal	Shahabaz Aman	Malayalam	
2013	Nam Duniya Nam Style	Take It Easy	Shaan Rahman	Kannada	
2014	Praise The Lord	Ab Kya Hua He	Shaan Rahman	Malayalam	
2015	Oru Vadakkan Selfie	Neelaambalin	Shaan Rahman	Malayalam	
2015	Lavender	Pulari Manjin, She's So Beautiful	Deepak Dev	Malayalam	
2015	Appavam Veenjum	Nee Thirapol	Ouseppachan	Malayalam	
2015	Jo and the Boy	Neeyen Kaattaai	Rahul Subramanian	Malayalam	
2016	Urumeen	Hey Umayaal	Achu Rajamani	Tamil	
2016	Chennai Koottam	Life is like A	Sajan K. Ram	Malayalam	
2016	Jacobinte Swargarajyam	Ee Shishirakaalam	Shaan Rahman	Malayalam	
2016	Jakkanna	Jakkanna	Dinesh	Telugu	
2016	Konjam Konjam	Kadhalgi	Vallavan	Tamil	
2017	Chunkzz	Chekkanum Pennum	Gopi Sundar	Malayalam	
2017	Mom	Agnijwalaa	A R Rahman	Malayalam	
2017	2 Countries	Ullasamlo	Gopi Sundar	Telugu	
2017	Vimaanam	Anthikevarikente, Meghakanavinu	Gopi Sundar	Malayalam	
2018	Hey Jude	Hey Don't Worry Jude	Rahul Raj	Malayalam	
2018	B.Tech	Peda Glassu	Rahul Raj	Malayalam	
2019	Irupathiyonnaam Noottaandu	Aaraaro Ardhramayi	Gopi Sundar	Malayalam	
2020	Kannum Kannum Kollaiyadithaal	Maaga Maaga	Harshavardhan Rameshwar	Tamil/Telugu	
2021	Thinkalazhcha Nishchayam	Kedanalame	Mujeeb Majeed	Malayalam	
2021	Varisi	Mayo	Nandha	Tamil	
2022	Jack N' Jill	Annatha Pokki	Ram Surendar	Malayalam	

== Other works ==
Year	Song	Album/Single	Composer(s)	Writer(s)	Singer(s)	Language	Ref
2014	Seeli Seeli Hawa, Uljhan	Izhaar	Narayananunni S	Kaustubh Panat, Heena Ansari	Siddharth Menon, Kavya Ajit	Hindi	
2014	Yaaro Nee	Kungumam Vecha Kekudhu	Surya Prasadh R	Anand Shankar	Surya Prasadh R, Kavya Ajit	Tamil	
2017	Lesbian Anthem	Ladies and Gentle Women	Justin Prabhakaran	Kutti Revathi	Anitha Karthikeyan, Kavya Ajit	Tamil	
2017	Rhythm of Life	Rhythm of Life	Vishal Chandrashekhar	Vishnu Edavan	Yazin Nizar, Kavya Ajit	Tamil	
2017	Thaye Thamizhe Vanangukerom	The Hindu Tamil Anthem	Madley Blues	Madhan Karky	Sathyaprakash Dharmar, Syed Subahan, Kavya Ajit	Tamil	
2019	Soodana Murukku	Soodana Murukku	Langkawi Paiyenz		Langkawi Paiyenz, Kavya Ajit	Tamil	
2020	Lucky One	Single	Kavya Ajit			English	
2020	Naamonnu (Kerala Diaries 2.0)	Single	Kavya Ajit	Arun Alat	Kavya Ajit	Malayalam	
2021	Puthiyathor Ulagam Seivom	Single	Kavya Ajit	Bharathidasan	Kavya Ajit	Tamil	
2021	BFF and I (I've got a friend)	Single	Kavya Ajit			English	
2022	So Good So True	Single	Kavya Ajit			English	
2023	Jaalame	Single	Kavya Ajit	Titto P Thankachan	Kavya Ajit	Malayalam	
2023	Pathiye	Single	Kavya Ajit	Titto P Thankachan	Kavya Ajit	Malayalam	
2023	Orma	Single	Kavya Ajit	Arun Alat, Kavya Ajit	Kavya Ajit	Malayalam	
