= Dove (film) =

- Directed by: Santhu
- Starring: Anoop Govindu; Adithi Rao; Rakesh Adiga
- Cinematography: K S Chandrashekhar
- Edited by: K M Prakash
- Music by: Arjun Janya
- Release date: 9 October 2015
- Country: India
- Language: Kannada

Dove is a 2015 Indian Kannada-language drama film directed by Santhu. It stars Anoop Govindu, Adithi Rao and Rakesh Adiga. It was released theatrically on 9 October 2015 after a two-year delay.

== Synopsis ==
Anoop and Aditi love each other but face an unexpected obstacle when Anoop gets charged with murder. Meanwhile, Kumar and Sona, who share an intimate relationship, try to overcome their challenges.

== Cast ==
- Anoop Govindu as Anoop
- Adithi Rao as Aditi
- Rakesh Adiga as Kumar
- Madalasa Sharma as Sona
- Daniel Balaji
- Avinash
- Jai Jagadish
- Pavithra Lokesh
- Sharath Lohithaswa
- Rangayana Raghu
- Jaggesh (Guest Appearance)

== Production ==
=== Filming ===
Filming begun on 2 February 2013, and on 4 December 2013, shooting was completed.

== Soundtrack ==
Dove

Soundtrack album by Arjun Janya
- Released: 2014
- Recorded: 2013
- Genre: Feature film soundtrack
- Length: 25:32
- Language: Kannada

Official audio
- Dove - Full Album on YouTube

The soundtrack of the audio was released on 25 October 2014. composed by Arjun Janya.

| No. | Title | Lyrics | Artist(s) | Length |
|---|---|---|---|---|
| 1. | "Ello Nan Dove" | Santhu | Puneeth Rajkumar | 3:49 |
| 2. | "Heegu Irabahude Male" | Santhu | Chandan | 4:38 |
| 3. | "Hello Hello" | Santhu | Arjun Janya | 3:47 |
| 4. | "Haalade Haalade" | Santhu | Karthik | 4:54 |
| 5. | "Heegu Irabahude (Female)" | Santhu | Vani Harikrishna | 4:31 |
| 6. | "Miss Call Manji" | Santhu | Arjun Janya | 5:13 |
| Total length: | | | | 25:32 |

== Reception ==
=== Critical response ===
A reviewer of Deccan Herald wrote "Otherwise, Dove, where seasoned veterans deliver, has nothing much by way of an engaging entertainer. It is purely time-pass for lovebirds who can indulge in themselves with Dove as excuse to spend time in togetherness in the darkened theatre". Shyam Prasad S from Bangalore Mirror said "Overall, Dove is a film that will not disappoint and is worth a watch for the novelty". Sunayana Suresh from The Times of India wrote "If you like your films with an extra dose of action and violence, this one’s for you. A good script is an added bonus".
