= List of Tulu films of 2020 =

The list of Tulu films that are scheduled to be released in 2020.

== Releases ==
=== January – June ===
Opening		Name	Director	Cast	Source
J A N U A R Y	3	Kudhkana Madme	A V Jayaraj	Pruthvi Ambaar, Sheetal Nayak, Aravind Bolar	
J A N U A R Y	10	2 Ekre	Vismaya Vinayak	Pruthvi Ambaar, Niriksha Shetty, Aravind Bolar, Sraddha Salian	
F E B R U A R Y	14	Yenna	Vishwanath Kodikal	Vineeth Kumar, Shruthi Poojari, Pruthvi Ambaar	

== See also ==
- List of Tulu films of 2014
- List of Tulu films of 2015
- List of Tulu films of 2016
- List of Tulu films of 2017
- List of Tulu films of 2018
- List of Tulu films of 2019
- List of Tulu films of 2021
- List of Tulu films of 2022
- List of Tulu films of 2023
- List of Tulu films of 2024
- List of Tulu films of 2025
- List of Released Tulu films
- Tulu cinema
- Tulu Movie Actors
- Tulu Movie Actresses
- Karnataka State Film Award for Best Regional film
- RED FM Tulu Film Awards
- List of Kannada films of 2020
