= List of Tulu-language films =

This article is a list of released Tulu films in the Tulu language.

1. Enna Tangadi (My Sister)
2. Daredha Budedhi (Official wife)
3. Pagetta Puge (Fume of Hate)
4. Bisatti Babu (Knife Babu)
5. Koti Chennayya
6. Kaasdaya Kandane (Money is honey)
7. Udalda Tudar (Flame Of Heart)
8. Yaan Sanyasi Aape (I will be a Saint)
9. Bayya Mallige (Evening Jasmine)
10. Yer Malthina Tappu (Who the wrong)
11. Saaviradorti Saavithri (Saavithri - The one in Thousand)
12. Inquilab Zindabad
13. Tulu Naada Siri (Wealth of Tulunad)
14. Sangama Saakshi (Witness of Union)
15. Nyaayogaad Enna Baduku (life for Justice)
16. Bollidota (Silver Garden)
17. Kariyani Kattandi Kandani (unofficial husband)
18. Bhagyavantedi (Fortune Lady)
19. Badkere Budle (Let me live)
20. Daareda Seere (The wedding saree)
21. Raathri Pagel (The Night and Day)
22. Pettayi Pili (Wounded Tiger)
23. Badkonji Kabite (Life is poet)
24. Satya Olundu (Where is Truth)
25. Bangar Patler (Gold-hearted Patler)
26. September 8
27. Badk Da Bile (The life value)
28. Maari Bale (Mari bale-The fishing net)
29. Onthe Edjast Malpi (Just adjust)
30. Suddha (Pure)
31. Kadala Mage (The Son of Sea)
32. Koti Chennaya
33. Badi (Dowry)
34. Gaggara (The Anklets)
35. Birse (The Smart)
36. Kanchilda Baale (Blessed Girl)
37. Oriyardori Asal (Smarter than other)
38. Aamait Asal-Eemait Kusal (Edge of gentle-edge of mischief)
39. Bangarda Kural (Golden Corn)
40. Sompa
41. Telikeda Bolli (Smiling Star)
42. Jokulatike
43. Rickshaw Driver (Auto driver) won Karnataka State Film Award for Best Regional film
44. Pakkilu Mooji (Three birds)
45. Barke-Kudlada Pilikulena Kathe (Barke – The saga of Manglore rowdyism)
46. Nirel (The Shadow)
47. Brahmashri Narayana Guru Swamy (Story of famous Saint Narayana Guru)
48. Rang (The Colour)
49. Chaali Polilu (Rascals)
50. Madime (The Wedding)
51. Soombe (Sorry)
52. Ekka Saka
53. Oriyan Thoonda Oriyagapuji (One against Other)
54. Dhand (Army)
55. Super Marmaye (Super Son-in-Law)
56. Chandi Kori (Calm Rooster)
57. Right Bokka Left Nadutu Kudonji (Right and Left - One more in between)
58. Ice Cream
59. Eregla Panodchi
60. Dhaniklena Joklu
61. Jai Tulunad
62. Pavitra
63. Kudla Cafe
64. Namma Kudla
65. Bollilu
66. Shutterdulai
67. Dostilu
68. Dabak Daba Aisa
69. Dombarata
70. Barsa
71. Panoda Bodcha
72. Pilibail Yamunakka
73. Guddeda Bhoota
74. Madipu
75. Chapter
76. Yesa
77. Maskiri (short film)
78. Arjun Weds Amrutha
79. Are Marler
80. Pattanaje
81. Nemoda Boolya
82. Rang Rang Da Dibbanna
83. Ambar Caterers
84. Bale Pudar Deeka E Preethig
85. Thottil
86. Appe Teacher
87. Namma Kusalda Javaner
88. Pettkammi
89. Ammer Polisa
90. Paddayi
91. Dagal Bajilu
92. Pattis Gang
93. Pammane the Great
94. My Name is Annappa
95. Yera Ullerge
96. Kori Rotti
97. Karne
98. Umil
99. Belchappa
100. Aaye Yer
101. Golmaal
102. Girgit
103. Jabardasth Shankara
104. Atidaonji Dina
105. Pundi Panavu
106. Deye Baidethi
107. Kambalabettu Bhatrena Magal
108. Katpadi Kattapa
109. Pingara
110. Kudhakana Madme
111. 2 Ekre
112. Yenna
113. Gamjaal
114. Pepperere Pererere (Direct OTT release)
115. English
116. Vikrant
117. Karnikada Kallurti
118. Yeregavuye Kirikiri
119. Soda Sharbhat
120. Bojaraj MBBS
121. Magane Mahisha
122. Raj Sounds And Lights
123. Abatara
124. Rana
125. Love Cocktail
126. VIP'S Last Bench
127. Paper Student
128. Shakalaka Boom Boom
129. Pili
130. Goujii Gammath
131. Gosmari Family
132. Pirkilu
133. Circus
134. Koramma
135. Pulimunchi
136. Raapata
137. Mr. Madimaye
138. Mr. Bori
139. One and Only Gabbar Singh
140. Balipe
141. Tthudarr
142. Dharma Daiva
143. Anarkali
144. Daskath
145. Middle Class Family
146. Meera
147. Gant Kalver
148. Dharma Chavadi
149. Netterekere
150. Pidayi
151. Jai
152. PiliPanja
153. Kattemar
154. Non Veg
155. Birduda Kambala
156. 90ML: Kullugana
157. Gajanana Cricketers Janthottu Since 1983
158. Dev Das Na Leela
159. Kajja
160. Picture

== See also ==
- Tulu cinema
- Lists of Tulu-language films
- Tulu Movie Actors
- Tulu Movie Actresses
- Karnataka State Film Award for Best Regional Film
- RED FM Tulu Film Awards
- Tulu Cinemotsava 2015
