= List of Tulu films of 2016 =

The list of Tulu films that are scheduled to be released in 2016.

== Releases ==
=== January – June ===
Opening	Name	Director	Cast	Source
15 January	Jai Tulunadu	Praveen Thokottu	Avinash Shetty, Sonal Monthero, Shreya Anchal, Bhavya	
5 February	Pavitra	Nagavenkatesh	Shravanth, Chirashree, Naveen D Padil, Bhojaraj Vamanjur, Aravind Bolar	
12 February	Kudla Cafe	Surya Menon	Naveen D Padil, Jyothish Shetty, Raghu Pandeshwar, Shine Shetty, Aahana Kumra	
1 April	Rambarooti	Prajwal Kumar Attavar	Vj Vineeth, Chirashri Anchan, Shruthi Kotyan	
8 April	Namma Kudla	Ashwini Harish Nayak	Prakash Shetty Dharmanagara, Ashwini Harish Nayak	
29 April	Bollilu	Sharatchandra Kumar Kadri	Shravan Kumar, Prateeksha, Peetambar Heraje, Saujanya Hegde	
27 May	Shutterdulai	Shashikanth Gatti	Jai Jagadish, Anita Bhat	
17 June	Dostilu	Santhosh kumar	Santhosh kumar, Vidya, Vignesh, Deepak, Chaithra, Priyaaka, Rathan Shetty, Shreya	

=== July – December ===
Opening	Name	Director	Cast	Source
5 August	Dabak Daba Aisa	Prakash Pandeshwar	Devadas Kapikad, Naveen D. Padil, Bhojaraj Vamanjoor	
15 September	Dombaraata	Ranjith Suvarna	Ammith Rao	
13 October	Barsa	Devadas Kapikad	Arjun Kapikad, Kshama Shetty, Naveen D Padil	
18 November	Panoda Bodcha	Madhu Surathkal	Shivadhvaj	
9 December	Pilibail Yamunakka	K Sooraj Shetty	Pruthvi Ambar, Sonal Monteiro, Naveen D Padil	

== See also ==
- List of Tulu films of 2019
- List of Tulu films of 2018
- List of Tulu films of 2017
- List of Tulu films of 2015
- List of Tulu films of 2014
- List of Released Tulu films
- Tulu cinema
- Tulu Movie Actors
- Tulu Movie Actresses
- Karnataka State Film Award for Best Regional film
- RED FM Tulu Film Awards
- Tulu Cinemotsava 2015
