= List of Tulu films of 2019 =

The list of Tulu films that are scheduled to be released in 2019.

== Releases ==
=== January – June ===
Opening		Name	Director	Cast	Source
F E B R U A R Y	2	Pundi Panavu	Gangadar Kirodian	Suraj Sunil, Suvarna Shetty	
F E B R U A R Y	15	Deye Baidethi	Sooryoday Perampalli	Seetha Kote, Sowjanya Hegde	
F E B R U A R Y	22	Kambalabettu Bhatrena Magal	Sharath S Poojari	Aishwarya Acharya, Shailesh Birwa	
M A R C H	29	Katapadi Kattappa	J P Tuminad	Uday Poojari, Charishma Salian	
A P R I L	19	Golmaal	Ramanand Nayak	Pruthvi Ambaar, Shreya Anchan	
M A Y	24	Aaye Yer	K. Manjunath Shimoga	Aravind Bolar, Sambrama Gowda	

=== July – Dec ===
Opening		Name	Director	Cast	Source
A U G U S T	9	Belchappa	Rajanish Devadiga	Rajanish Devadiga, Yashaswi Devadiga	
A U G U S T	23	Girgit	Roopesh Shetty, Rakesh Kadri	Roopesh Shetty, Shilpa Shetty	
N O V E M B E R	8	Jabardasth Shankara	Devadas Kapikad	Arjun Kapikad, Neetha Ashok	
D E C E M B E R	6	Aatidonji Dina	Haris Konajekal	Pruthvi Ambaar, Nireeksha	

== See also ==
- List of Tulu films of 2020
- List of Tulu films of 2018
- List of Tulu films of 2017
- List of Tulu films of 2016
- List of Tulu films of 2015
- List of Tulu films of 2014
- List of Released Tulu films
- Tulu cinema
- Tulu Movie Actors
- Tulu Movie Actresses
- Karnataka State Film Award for Best Regional film
- RED FM Tulu Film Awards

== Read as ==
- TBA* - To be announced.
- TBC* - To be confirmed.
- TBD* - To be determined.
