= List of Tulu films of 2017 =

The list of Tulu films that are scheduled to be released in 2017.

== Releases ==
=== January – June ===
Opening	Name	Director	Cast	Source
6 January	Guddedha Bootha	Sandeep Paniyur	Sandeep Bhakta, Ashwitha Nayak, Dinesh Attavar	
10 March	Madipu	Chethan Mundari	Sardar Sathya, M. K. Matta, Seetha Kote	
7 April	Chapter	Mohan Bhatkal	Asthik Shetty, Aishwarya Hegde	
6 May	Yesa	M.N. Jayanth	Rahul Amin, Radhika Rao, Aravind Bolar	

=== July – December ===
Opening	Name	Director	Cast	Source
21 July	Arjun Weds Amrutha	Raghu Shetty	Anoop Sagar, Aaradya Shetty	
11 August	Are Marler	Devdas Kapikad	Arjun Kapikad, Nishmitha	
1 September	Pattanaje	Thonse Vijaykumar Shetty	Soorya Rao, Reshma Shetty	
22 September	Nemoda Boolya	B. K. Gangadhar Kirodian	Preetham Shetty Kadar, Rajani	
3 November	Rang Rangda Dibbana	Krishnaprasad Uppinakote	Raviraj Shetty, Samhita Shah	
24 November	Ambar Caterers	Jaiprakash Bajal	Saurabh, Sindhu Lokanath	

== See also ==
- List of Tulu films of 2019
- List of Tulu films of 2018
- List of Tulu films of 2016
- List of Tulu films of 2015
- List of Tulu films of 2014
- List of Released Tulu films
- Tulu cinema
- Tulu Movie Actors
- Tulu Movie Actresses
- Karnataka State Film Award for Best Regional film
- RED FM Tulu Film Awards
