= List of Tulu films of 2018 =

The list of Tulu films that were scheduled to be released in 2018.

== Releases ==
=== January – June ===
Opening	Name	Director	Cast	Source
16 February	Bale Pudar Deeka E Preethig	JV Manoranjan	Anvitha Sagar	
23 March	Appe Teacher	Kishore Moodbidri	Sunil, Niharika Shetty	
23 March	Thottil	Prajwal Kumar Attavar	Vijeth Suvarna, Sureka Bhat	
11 May	Namma Kusalda Javanyer	Ganesh Dass Kharvi	Amith Karkada, Shobita Amin	
18 May	Pettkammi	Manjunath Keerthi	Anvitha Sagar, Prathik Shetty, Radhesh	
22 June	Ammer Polisa	K Sooraj Shetty	Roopesh Shetty, Puja	

=== July – December ===
Opening	Name	Director	Cast	Source
13 July	Paddayi	Abhaya Simha	Mohan Sheni, Bindu Rakshidhi, Chandrahas Ullal	
20 July	Dagal Bajilu	Prashanth Acharya	Vignesh, Priya Hegde, Naveen D Padil	
10 August	Pattis Gang	Sooraj Bolar	Mohan Sheni, Vismaya Vinayak, Ajay Raj, Navyatha Rai	
24 August	Pammanne The Great	Ismael Moodsheddy	Pruthvi Ambar, Shilpa Suvarna, Aravind Bolar	
21 September	My Name is Annappa	Mayur R Shetty	Manju Rai Moolooru, Shubha Shetty	
21 September	Yera Ullerge	Devdas Kapikad	Arjun Kapikad, Rashmitha Chengappa, Devdas Kapikad	
26 October	Kori Rotti	Rajanish Devadiga	Rajanish Devadiga, Anushree	
16 November	Karne	Sakshath Malpe	Arjun Kapikad, Chirashree Anchan	
7 December	Umil	Ranjith Suvarna	Umesh Mijar, Puja, Navya Poojari	

== See also ==
- List of Tulu films of 2020
- List of Tulu films of 2019
- List of Tulu films of 2017
- List of Tulu films of 2016
- List of Tulu films of 2015
- List of Tulu films of 2014
- List of Released Tulu films
- Tulu cinema
- Tulu Movie Actors
- Tulu Movie Actresses
- Karnataka State Film Award for Best Regional film
- RED FM Tulu Film Awards
