= List of Tulu films of 2015 =

The list of Tulu films produced in the year 2015.

== Releases ==
| Sl No | Film | Cast | Producer | Director |
|---|---|---|---|---|
| 1 | Soombe | Rahul, Shritama Mukherjee, Devadas Kapikad, Naveen D Padil, Bhojaraj Vamnjoor, Aravind Bolar, Vaijanath Biradar, Bullet Prakash, Srinagar Kitty, Prasanna. | Kishor Kottari, Shwetha K Kottari. | Saikrishna Kudla |
| 2 | Ekka Saka | Hithesh, Sonal, Naveen D Padil, Bhojaraj Vamanjoor, Aravind Bolar, Shobharaj, Chaitra, Umanath, Achyuth Kumar, Sathish Bandale, Sudha, Padmaja, Sunder Rai, Ravi, Prasanna. | Kishore Shetty | K Sooraj |
| 3 | Oriyan Thoonda Oriyagapuji | Arjun Kapikad, Prajwal Poovaih, Bhavya, Bhojaraj Vamanjoor, Aravind Bolar, Mitra, Rekhadas, Chethan Rai, Saikrishna. | Gangadhar Shetty. | H.S. Rajashekar |
| 4 | Dhand | Arjun Kapikad, Sandeep Shetty, Anoop Sagar, Shilpa, Anvitha, Nidhi, Deepak Paladka, Umesh Mijar, Ranjan, Shodhan Prasad. | Shodhan Prasad. | Ranjith Bajpe |
| 5 | Super Marmaye | Ragavendra Rai, Divyashree, Gopinath Bhat, Naveen D Padil, Aravind Bolar, Bhojaraj Vamanjoor | Adyar Madhav Nayak | Ram Shetty |
| 6 | Chandi Kori | Arjun Kapikad, Karishma Amin, Devadas Kapikad, Naveen D Padil, Bhojaraj Vamanjoor, Aravind Bolar, Gopinath Bhat, Chethan Rai | Sharmila Kapikad, Sachin Sunder | Devadas Kapikad |
| 7 | Right Bokka Left-Nadutu Kudonji | Sandeep Shetty, Prasanna Bailooru, Harsha Chaya, Namitha Sharan, Mohair Shetty, Tonse Vijay Kumar Shetty, Shobha Rai, Dayakar Alva, Sharatchandra Kumar, Uday Kumar Shetty, Anil Kumar Alva, Kemthur Ashok Shetty, Rajesh Shetty | Chandrashekhar Rai | Yatish Kumar Alva |
| 8 | Ice Cream (Tulu Film) | Roopesh Shetty, Anvita Rao | | |
| 9 | Eregla Panodchi | Sandeep Shetty, Shivadhwaj, Neethu, Raksha Shenoy, Anitha Bhat, Ila Vitla, Shobha Rai, Bhojaraj Vamanjoor, Aravind Bolar, Sundar Rai Mandara, Ravi Surathkal, Pradeep Alva, Roopa Varkadi, Kavitha Rai, Shashidhar Bellaya, Tamma Lakshmana, Rajgopal Josh | B.L. Murali and S.K. Shetty | Kodlu Ramakrishna |
| 10 | Dhaniklena Joklu | Umesh Mijar, Ragavendra Rai, Disha | Ramesh Poojari | Vinumahesh |

== See also ==
- List of Tulu films of 2019
- List of Tulu films of 2018
- List of Tulu films of 2017
- List of Tulu films of 2016
- List of Tulu films of 2014
- List of Released Tulu films
- Tulu cinema
- Tulu Movie Actors
- Tulu Movie Actresses
- Karnataka State Film Award for Best Regional film
- RED FM Tulu Film Awards
- Tulu Cinemotsava 2015
