= List of Tulu films of 2023 =

List of Tulu films produced in the Coastalwood in India that were released in the year 2023.

== Releases ==
Opening	Title	Director	Cast	Source
13 January	Paper Student	Vadiraj K. Uppoor	Harshith Shetty, Akarsh S. Kundar and Salome D'Souza	
20 January	Shakalaka Boom Boom	Shrisha Yellare	Aravind Bolar, Godwin Sparkle, Laksha Shetty	
10 February	Pili	Mayur R Shetty	Bharath Bhandary, Vijayakumar Kodialbail, Navin D Padil, Arvind Bolar, Bhojaraj Vamanjoor,	
14 April	Goujii Gammath	Mani A J Karthikeyan	Devdas Kapikad, Naveen D. Padil, Arvind Bolar, Prasanna Shetty Bailur, Umesh Mijaru	
18 May	Gosmari Family	Sai Krishna Kudla	Arjun Kapikad, Samata Amin, Devadas Kapikad, Naveen D Padil, Arvind Bolar, Bhojaraj Vamanjoor	
26 May	Pirkilu	H D Arya	Vardhan, Sudesh, Salomi D'Souza, Latha, Arvind Bolar, Bhojaraj Vamanjoor, Deepak Rai Panaje, Ravi Ramakunja	
23 June	Circus	Roopesh Shetty	Roopesh Shetty, Rachana Rai, Naveen D Padil, Aravind Bolar, Bhojaraj Vamanjoor	
11 August	Koramma	Shivadhwaj Shetty	Mohan Sheni, Bindu Rakshidi, Guru Hegde, Roopa Varkady	
22 September	Yaan Superstar	Santosh Shetty	Dayanand Shetty, Harish Vasu Shetty, Manasi Sudhir, Ansha, Naveen D. Padil, Bhojaraj Vamanjoor	
27 October	Pulimunchi	Trishul Shetty	Vineeth Kumar, Samata Amin, Aradya Shetty	
1 December	Raapata	Arjun Kapikad	Anoop Sagar, Niriksha Shetty, Devdas Kapikad, Roopa Vorkady	

== See also ==
- List of Tulu-language films
