= List of Tulu films of 2022 =

List of Tulu films produced in the Coastalwood in India that are released/scheduled to be released in the year 2022.

== Releases ==
=== January – June ===
Opening		Name	Director	Cast	Source
F E B R U A R Y	18	Bojaraj MBBS	Ismail Moodushedde	Bhojaraj Vamanjoor, Navya Poojary, Devadas Kapikad, Aravind Bolar and Sheetal Nayak	
A P R I L	29	Magane Mahisha	Veerendra Shetty	Devadas Kapikad, Aravind Bolar, Naveen D Padil and Bhojaraj Vamanjoor	
M A Y	20	Raj Sounds and Lights	Rahul Amin	Vineeth Kumar, Yasha Shiva Kumarr	

=== July - December ===
Opening		Name	Director	Cast	Source
A U G U S T	18	Abatara Maternala	Arjun Kapikad	Arjun Kapikad, Gaana Bhat	
N O V E M B E R	25	Love Cocktail	K. Sooraj Shetty	Aravind Bolar, Bhojaraj Vamanjoor, Sarika Rao	
D E C E M B E R	16	VIP’s Last Bench	Pradhan M P	Pruthvi Ambar, Roopesh Shetty, Vineeth Kumar	

== See also ==
- List of Released Tulu films
- Tulu cinema
