= List of Tulu films of 2021 =

The list of Tulu films that are scheduled to be released in 2021.

== Releases ==
=== January – June ===
Opening		Name	Director	Cast	Source
F E B R U A R Y	19	Gamjaal	Naveen Shetty, Suman Suvarna	Roopesh Shetty, Karishma Amin	
M A R C H	7	Pepperere Pererere	Shobharaj Pavoor	Shobharaj Pavoor, Chaitrra Shetty	
M A R C H	26	English	K Sooraj Shetty	Pruthvi Ambaar, Navya Pujari	

=== Scheduled for July – Dec ===
Opening		Name	Director	Cast	Source
N O V E M B E R	12	Vikranth	Naveen Marla Kodange	Aruva Koragappa Shetty, Radhakrishna Naavada Madhur, Bantwal Jayarama Acharya, Kadaba Dinesh Rai, Koda Padavu Dinesh Shettigar, and Poornima Yathish	
D E C E M B E R	3	Karrnikodha Kalluri	Mahendra Kumar	Shailendra D J, Chandini Anchan, Mahendra Kumar	
D E C E M B E R	24	Yeregavuye Kirikiri	Raam Shetty	Mohammed Nayeem, Naveen D. Padil, Aishwariya Hegde, Shraddha Salian, Aravind Bolar, Umesh Mijar, Sai Krishna Kudla	
D E C E M B E R	31	Soda Sharbhat	Pradeep Barboza	Pradeep Bardoza, Devda Kapikad, Ranjitha Lewis, Laveena Fernandes, Aravind Bolar	

== See also ==
- Tulu cinema
- Tulu Movie Actors
- Tulu Movie Actresses
- Karnataka State Film Award for Best Regional film
- RED FM Tulu Film Awards
- List of Tulu films of 2024
