= Are Marler =

- Directed by: Devadas Kapikad
- Starring: Arjun Kapikad
- Music by: Devadas Kapikad; Manikanth Kadri
- Production company: Bolli Movies
- Release date: 11 August 2017
- Country: India
- Language: Tulu

Are Marler is an Indian Tulu-language film directed by Devadas Kapikad, who also appears in a supporting role. The film's stars are Arjun Kapikad and Nishmitha. The film was released on 11 August 2017. The film had crossed 100 days at Big Cinemas.

== Plot ==
Sakshi, the daughter of a millionaire and a vivacious girl, plays pranks on Shekara as a part of her project. Shekara falls in love with her and his unemployed friends help him impress her.

== Cast ==
- Arjun Kapikad as Shekara
- Nishmitha as Sakshi
- Aryan Ashik as Gopi
- Arjun Kaje
- Devadas Kapikad

== Soundtrack ==
Are Marler

Soundtrack album by Devadas Kapikad
- Released: June 2017
- Genre: Feature film soundtrack
- Label: Anand Audio

The soundtrack of the film was composed by Devadas Kapikad and background score by Manikanth Kadri. The soundtrack album was released in June 2017 with the Anand Audio acquiring the audio rights.

Track listing
No.	Title	Lyrics	Singer(s)	Length
1.	"Karpoorada Gombe"	Devadas Kapikad	Arjun Kapikad
2.	"Manase Manase"	Devadas Kapikad	Nakul Abhyankar
3.	"Kudlada Chameli"	Devadas Kapikad	Supriya Lohith
4.	"Love rap"	Devadas Kapikad	Devadas Kapikad, Arjun Kaje

== List of Tulu Movies ==
- List of tulu films of 2015
- List of Tulu films of 2014
- List of Released Tulu films
- Tulu cinema
- Tulu Movie Actors
- Tulu Movie Actresses
- Karnataka State Film Award for Best Regional film
- RED FM Tulu Film Awards
- Tulu Cinemotsava 2015
