= Kanchilda Baale =

- Theatrical release poster
- Directed by: Raghunath Rai Kumbra,
- Written by: Krishnappa Uppoor
- Produced by: Raghunath Rai Kumbra
- Starring: Charithra Hegde; Muthappa Rai; Shakunthala Shetty T Naveen D Padil; Sai Krishna; Aravind Bolar; D N Bolar Pradeepchandra; Manasi D S Sudhirraj Kateel; Ravi Hosur; Harini Karkala
- Cinematography: P L Ravi
- Music by: Top Star Renu
- Release date: 25 March 2011
- Running time: 130 minutes
- Country: India
- Language: Tulu

Kanchilda Baale is a Tulu Language Film directed and produced by Raghunath Rai Kumbra. Charithra Hedge from Udupi has acted in the title role Kanchilda Baale. A film showing conflict between superstitions and beliefs of people highlights the bhootharadhane (spirit worship) of the region.

== Plot ==
Manu, a doctor who lives in the U.S., visits his mother along with his wife and daughter, in the ancestral house after several years. Ajjamma (Manu's mother) tells Manu that she had promised to perform the Kanchil ceremony if a girl was born to her son, but Manu dismisses it as a "blind belief". She made the promise as her son and daughter-in-law did not have a child even after more than four years of marriage. Manu said that he would not allow his daughter to participate in the ceremony as he and his wife had deferred having a baby because she was still pursuing her studies for some years after they got married. In many ways, the film is about negotiating between tradition and modernity, and faith and superstition, as well as the omnipresent caste. Manu's wife suggests that there is no harm in letting the ceremony as it would please the old woman. Manu remained adamant arguing that his daughter was not born because god willed it to happen.

== Cast ==
- Charithra Hedge as Kanchilda Baale
- Muthappa Rai
- Shakunthala Shetty T
- Naveen D Padil
- Sai Krishna
- Aravind Bolar
- D N Bolar
- Pradeepchandra
- Manasi D S
- Sudhirraj Kateel
- Ravi Hosur
- Harini Karkala

== List of Tulu Movies ==
- List of tulu films of 2015
- List of Tulu films of 2014
- List of Released Tulu films
- Tulu cinema
