= List of Tulu films of 2014 =

List of Tulu language films produced in the Tulu film industry in 2014. Tulu is a language of India. The first Tulu language film was released in 1971.

== Releases ==
Release date	Film	Cast	Director	Producers
1	Pakkilu Mooji	Aravind Bolar, Prakash Kabettu, Satish Bandale, Shruthi Heera		
February 14	Barke	Nagaraj Ambar, Ashwin Shetty, Srikanth, Balachandra, Riya Meghana	Bharath Krishna	Suresh Reddy
March 7	Nirel	Anoop Sagar, Varuna Shetty, Deepak Paladka, Deepthi Salian, Ramesh Aravind	Ranjith Bajpe	Shodhan Prasad San Poojary
4	Brahmashri Narayana Guru Swamy	Venkatadri, Vijaya Raghavendra, Rajshekar Kotian, Balakrishna Shetty, Suryodhaya, Abhayachandra Jain, Jaya C suvarna, Umanath Kotian, Chandrashekar Suvarna, Ashok Karnad, Chandrakanth, Sudheer Kotary, Ranjith, Gagan, Aravind Bolar, Bojaraj Vamanjoor, Boomika, Navya, Chitra Suvarna, Ashwini	Rajashekar Kotian	Rajashekar Kotian
August 8	Rang	Arjun Kapikad, Deekshtiha Acharya, Naveen D Padil, Devadas Kapikad, Bhojaraj Vamanjoor, Johnny Lever	Suhan Prasad; Vismaya Vinayak	Pramila Dev - Devdas; Kumar Pandeshwar
October 31	Chaali Polilu	Devadas Kapikad, Naveen D Padil, Bhojaraj Vamanjoor, Divyashree, Aravind Bolar	Veerendra Shetty Kavoor	Prakash Pandeshwar
7	Madime	Likith Shetty, Ramya Barna, Umesh Mijar, Navya, Usha Bhandary, Bhojaraj Vamanjoor, Jayarama Acharya, Santosh Shetty, Chetan Rai Mani, Raghavendra Rai, Sandeep Shetty, Prasanna Bailoor, Sunil Nelligudde, Manju Rai Muloor, Rohini Jagaram, Ramesh Kalladka, Dayanand Kulal Urwa, Arun Shetty Mangaladevi, Yadav Mannagudde, Vinod Yekkur, Mangesh Bhat Vittal, and Harish Moodbidri.	Vijaykumar Kodialbail	Megina Malady; Balakrishna Shetty

== See also ==
- List of Tulu films of 2019
- List of Tulu films of 2018
- List of Tulu films of 2017
- List of Tulu films of 2016
- List of Tulu films of 2015
- List of Released Tulu films
- Tulu cinema
- Tulu Movie Actors
- Tulu Movie Actresses
- Karnataka State Film Award for Best Regional film
- RED FM Tulu Film Awards
- Tulu Cinemotsava 2015
