= List of Tulu films of 2026 =

This is a list of Tulu films that are scheduled to be released in 2026.

== Releases ==
=== January – December ===
Opening		Name	Director	Cast	Ref
JAN	16	Kattemar	Sachin Katla	Swaraj Shetty, J. P. Thuminad, Harshitha Kulal, Aakansha Rao, Lanchulal K S	
FEB	6	Non Veg	K Sooraj Shetty	Atharva Prakash, Sanjana Burli, Prakash Thuminad, Naveen D. Padil	
FEB	27	Birduda Kaumbula	Rajendra Singh Babu	Adithya, Prakash Raj, P. Ravi Shankar, Radhika Narayan, Naveen D. Padil, Usha Bhandary	
APR	10	90ML: Kullugana	Ranjith C Bajal	Vineeth Kumar, Ruhani Shetty, Roshan S Shetty, Aravind Bolar	
APR	24	Dev Das Na Leela	Tejesh Poojary	Devadas Kapikad, Adhvithi Shetty, Aravind bolar, Elton Jeff	
MAY	22	Gajanana Cricketers Janthottu Since 1983	Keerthan Bhandary	Vineeth Kumar, Samata Amin, Anvitha Sagar, Bhojaraj Vamanjoor	
JUNE	11	Kajja	Jishnu S Menon	Siddharth Shetty, Vasishta Simha, Sahana Sudhakara, Wencita Dias	
AUGUST	07	Picture	Sandeep Bedra	Nithyaprakash Bantwal, Amrutha Sudu, Devadas Kapikad, Naveen D. Padil, Aravind Bolar	
SEPT	19	Toss	Arjun Kapikad	Arjun kapikad, Sutej Shetty, Naveen D Patil, Aravind Bolar,	
OCT	23	Bana	Nithin Rai Kukkuvalli	Uppala Jayaprakash, Roopashree Vorkady, Bhavya Poojary, Nihal Rai	

== See also ==
- List of Tulu-language films
- List of Tulu films of 2025
- Tulu cinema
