= Ranjith Bajpe =

Indian film director and screenwriter

- Born: Ranjith Kumar; Bajpe, Manglaore India
- Other name: Ranjith Bajpe
- Occupations: Film Director, Screenwriter
- Years active: 2014

Ranjith Kumar, popularly known as Ranjith Bajpe is an Indian film director and Screen Writer known for his work in Tulu cinema. He is best known for directing First International Tulu film Nirel (2014) which won 5 awards including the best movie award at Tulu Cinemotsava 2015. He also written directed Dhand (2015) which is the first Tulu language movie released in Israel, Australia and UK. Ranjith Bajpe usually casts new actors for his movies.

== Early life ==
Ranjith Bajpe was born on 9 December 1985, in Bajpe, in Dakshina Kannada district of Karnataka State. During his school days he acted in dramas and skits. His father's love of Yakshagana and brother's passion for drama contributed to his passion for movies. Currently working in Dubai, he is the only Tulu director who works on movies during annual leave of his company.

== Filmography ==
Year	Film						
Year	Film	Director	Story	Screenplay	Dialogues	Language	Notes
2014	Nirel	Yes			Yes	Tulu	5 Awards including Best Film at Tulu Cinemostsava 2015
2014	Bolkir (Short Film)			Yes		Tulu	
2015	Dhand	Yes	Yes	Yes	Yes	Tulu	First Tulu movie to be released in Australia and UK
2019	Maya Kannadi					Kannada	Executive Producer

== List of Tulu Movies links ==
- List of tulu films of 2016
- List of tulu films of 2015
- List of Tulu films of 2014
- List of Released Tulu films
- Tulu cinema
- Tulu Movie Actors
- Tulu Movie Actresses
