= List of Tulu films of 2025 =

This is a list of Tulu films that are scheduled to be released in 2025.

== Releases ==
=== January – June ===
Opening		Name	Director	Cast	Ref
JAN	31	Middle Class Family	Rahul Amin	Vineeth Kumar, Samata Amin, Naveen D. Padil, Aravind Bolar, Bhojaraj Vamanjoor	
APRIL	11	Meera	Aswath Unni	Lakshya L, Aswath Unni, Prakash Thuminad, Swaraj Shetty, Roopashree Vorkady	
MAY	23	Gant Kalver	Sudhakar Bannanje	Aryan Harsha Shetty, Smitha Suvarna, Naveen D. Padil, Aravind Bolar	

=== July – December ===
Opening		Name	Director	Cast	Ref
JULY	11	Dharma Chavadi	Nithin Kukkuvalli	Ravi Snehith, Dhanya Poojary, Rakshan Madoor	
AUGUST	29	Netterekere	Swaraj Shetty	Swaraj Shetty, Suman, Dishali Poojary, Bhavya Poojary	
SEPTEMBER	12	Pidayi	Santosh Mada	Sharath Lohitashwa, Ila Vitla, Devi Nair, Deepak Panaje	
NOVEMBER	14	Jai	Roopesh Shetty	Suniel Shetty, Roopesh Shetty, Adhvithi Shetty, Aravind Bolar	
DECEMBER	12	PiliPanja	Bharath Shetty	Ramesh Rai Kukkuvalli, Roopashree Vorkady, Rakshan Madoor, Disha Rani	

== See also ==
- List of Tulu-language films
- List of Tulu films of 2024
- Tulu cinema
