= Right Bokka Left =

Right Bokka Left - Nadutu Kudonji
- Directed by: Yelnad Yatish Alva
- Written by: Yelnad Yatish Alva
- Produced by: Yelnad Yatish Alva, K Chandrashekar Rai Akshay Puttur
- Starring: Sandeep Shetty; Prasanna Shetty Bailoor; Tonse Vijay Kumar Shetty; Kumbra Dayakar Alva; Chaya Harsha; Namita Sharan; Mohair Shetty; Mervin
- Cinematography: M.Yathish Kumar Alva
- Edited by: M.Yathish Kumar Alva
- Music by: Dr Nitin Acharya
- Production company: golden studios bangalore
- Distributed by: mangalambika productions
- Release date: 5 November 2015
- Country: India
- Language: Tulu
- Budget: ₹0.18 crore (US$19,000)

Right Bokka Left - Nadutu Kudonji is a Tulu language film directed by Yelnad Yatish Alva starring Sandeep Shetty, Prasanna Shetty Bailoor in lead roles and Tonse Vijay Kumar Shetty, Kumbra Dayakar Alva, Chaya Harsha, Namita Sharan, Mohair Shetty, Mervin are the remaining actors. Right Bokka Left is produced under the banner of Sri Mangalambika Productions by Yelnad Yatish Alva, & K Chandrashekar Rai Akshay Puttur.

== Plot ==
The movie is about how a helpless person is helped by his friends and finally becomes an industrialist.

== Cast ==
- Sandeep Shetty
- Prasanna Shetty Bailoor
- Tonse Vijay Kumar Shetty
- Kumbra Dayakar Alv
- Chaya Harsha
- Namita Sharan
- Mohair Shetty
- Mervin

== Soundtrack ==
The soundtracks of the film were composed by Dr Nitin Acharya. penned by director M.Yathish Kumar Alva.Released by Muzik247 Tulu

Sl.No	Song	Singer	Lyrics
01	Kudonji Janmogoo	Dr.Nitin Acharya	yelnad yathish
02	Ponda		yelnaad yathish
03	Ninane Kendita		yelnaad yathish
04	Bijuna Galig Male Version		yelnaad yathish
05	Bijuna Galig Female Version		yelnad yathish
06	Right Bokka Left	Dr. Nithin Acharya	

== List of Tulu Movies Links ==
- List of tulu films of 2015
- List of Tulu films of 2014
- List of Released Tulu films
- Tulu cinema
- Tulu Movie Actors
- Tulu Movie Actresses
