= Oriyan Thoonda Oriyagapuji =

- Theatrical release poster
- Directed by: H.S.Rajshekar
- Written by: Gangadhar Shetty
- Produced by: Gangadhar Shetty and Ashok Kumar
- Starring: Arjun Kapikad; Prajwal Pooviah
- Music by: V.Manohar
- Release date: 15 May 2015
- Country: India
- Language: Tulu

Oriyan Thoonda Oriyagapuji is an Indian Tulu-language comedy film directed by H.S. Rajshekhar starring Arjun Kapikad, Prajwal Pooviah in the lead roles and Bhojaraj Vamanjoor, Aravind Bolar, Rekhadas, Mitra, Chethan Rai, Sunder Rai, Saikrishna in supporting roles. Oriyan Thoonda Oriyagapuji is produced by Gangadhar Shetty and Ashok Kumar under the banner of Sri Mangala Ganesh Combines. The movie was released on 15 May 2015.

== Cast ==
- Arjun Kapikad
- Prajwal Pooviah
- Bhojaraj Vamanjoor
- Aravind Bolar
- Rekhadas
- Mitra
- Chethan Rai
- Sunder Rai
- Saikrishna

== Soundtrack ==
The soundtracks of the film were composed by V.Manohar

== List of Tulu Movies ==
- List of tulu films of 2015
- List of Tulu films of 2014
- List of Released Tulu films
- Tulu cinema
