= Eregla Panodchi =

Eregla Panodchi (Yeregla Panodchi)
- Directed by: Kodlu Ramakrishna
- Written by: Sachin Shetty kumble
- Produced by: B.L. Murali and S.K. Shetty
- Starring: Sandeep Shetty; Neethu; Shivadhwaj; Anita Bhat; Bhojaraj Vamanjoor; Raksha Shenoy; Arvind Bolar; Sundar Rai Mandara
- Cinematography: Shashidar Shettar
- Edited by: Basavaraj Aras
- Music by: Giridhar Dhiwan
- Release date: 27 November 2015
- Country: India
- Language: Tulu

Eregla Panodchi is a Tulu language film directed by Kodlu Ramakrishna starring Sandeep Shetty, Shivadhwaj, Neethu, Raksha Shenoy, Anitha Bhat, Ila Vitla, Shobha Rai, Bhojaraj Vamanjoor, Aravind Bolar, Sundar Rai Mandara, Ravi Surathkal, Pradeep Alva, Roopa Varkadi, Kavitha Rai, Shashidhar Bellaya, Tamma Lakshmana, Rajgopal Josh and others. Eregla Panodchi is jointly produced under the banner of Kodlu Creations by B.L. Murali and S.K. Shetty. This is 25th film directed by Kodlu Ramakrishna, who directed Kannada and Tulu movies too.

The movie is a remake of director's own 1994 Kannada movie Yarigu Helbedi.This is the second remake in Tulu movies after Shutterdulai.

== Plot ==
Eregla Panodchi is the story of housewives living in rented row houses called as Vatara, who have strong urge to own their own houses. But their husbands being lazy, continue to be indifferent to their desire. At this juncture there enters a social worker in the vatara who nurtures the ambitions of these housewives to own a house.

== Cast ==
- Sandeep Shetty
- Shivadhwaj Shetty
- Neethu
- Anitha Bhat
- Ila Vitla
- Raksha Shenoy
- Shobha Rai
- Bhojaraj Vamanjoor
- Aravind Bolar
- Sundar Rai Mandara
- Ravi Surathkal
- Pradeep Alva
- Roopa Varkadi
- Kavitha Rai
- Shashidhar Bellaya
- Tamma Lakshmana
- Rajgopal Josh

== Soundtrack ==
The soundtracks of the film were composed by Giridhar Dhiwan and released at Shambavi Hotel, Udupi on Sunday 11 October 2015

== See also ==
- List of Tulu films of 2015
- List of Tulu films of 2014
- List of Released Tulu films
- Tulu cinema
- Tulu Movie Actors
- Tulu Movie Actresses
