= Tulu Cinemotsava 2015 =

Tulu Cinemotsava Film Awards
- Country: India
- Presented by: Bharath International Travels
- First award: 2015

The Tulu Cinemotsava 2015 is an award ceremony for Tulu films. The awards ceremony has been instituted to honour both artistic and technical excellence in Tulu language Film Industry.

== Awards List ==
The Lifetime Achievement Awardwas conferred on K N Tailor and Sanjeeva Dandakeri.

- Emerging Actor Award (Male)- Arjun Kapikad
- Emerging Actor Award (Female)- Deekshitha Acharya

Tulu Cinemostava Awards 2012–2013 (Jury)

- Best Film - Rickshaw Driver
- Best Actor (Male) - Shivadhwaj for Bangarda Kural
- Best Actor (Female) - Pakhi Hegde for Bangarda Kural
- Best Director - Ram Shetty for Bangarda Kural
- Best Actor in a Comic Role - Navin D Padil for Telikeda Bolli
- Best Male Playback Singer - Shankar Mahadevan Rickshaw Driver
- Best Female Playback Singer - Sangeeta Balachandra for Bangarda Kural
- Best Music Director - V.Manohar for Bangarda Kural
- Best Choreography - Madan Harini for Bangarda Kural
- Best Actor in a Negative Role - Suresh Kulal for Telikeda Bolli
- Best Supporting Actor - Naveen D. Padil for Aamaitu Asal Emait Kusal
- Best Supporting Actor - Devadas Kapikad for Telikeda Bolli
- Best Supporting Actress - Padmaja Rao for Rickshaw Driver
- Best Lyricist - Amrutha Someshwer for Bangarda Kural
- Best Editor - Nasim Hakim Ansari for Bangarda Kural
- Best Art Direction - Tamma Lakshman for Bangarda Kural
- Best Dialogue - Devadas Kapikad for Telikeda Bolli
- Best Story - Praveen Kumar Konchady for Rickshaw Driver
- Best Cinematography - Raju K G for Bangarda Kural

Tulu Cinemostava Awards 2014 (Jury)

- Best Film- Nirel
- Best Actor (Male)- Venkatadri for Brahmashri Narayana Guru Swamy
- Best Actor (Female)- Ramya Barna for Madime
- Best Supporting Actor- Chethan Rai for Madime
- Best Supporting Actress- Deepthi salian for Nirel
- Best Actor in a Comic Role- Bhojaraj Vamanjoor for Madime
- Best Actor in a Negative Role- Chethan Rai for Chaali Polilu
- Best Story - Karthik R Gowda for Nirel
- Best Dialogue- Shubhakar Bannanje for Brahmashri Narayana Guru Swamy
- Best Art Direction- Tamma Lakshman for Madime
- Best Choreography- Madan Harini for Madime
- Best Choreography- Cool Jayanth for Chaali Polilu
- Best cinematographer- Mani Kookal for Nirel
- Best Lyricist - Vijay Kumar Kodialbail for Madime
- Best Music Director - V.Manohar for Chaali Polilu
- Best Male Playback Singer-Sonu Nigam for Madime
- Best Female Playback Singer - Chithra for Madime
- Best Editor - P V Mohan for Chaali Polilu
- Best Director- Virendra Shetty Kavoor for Chaali Polilu

Tulu Cinemostava Awards 2012–2013 (Through Public Voting)

- Best Film - Rickshaw Driver
- Best Actor - Arjun Kapikad
- Best Actress - Neha Saxena

Tulu Cinemostava Awards 2014 (Through Public Voting)

- Best Film - Chaali Polilu
- Best Actor - Naveen D Padil
- Best Actress - Divyashree

== List of Tulu Movies ==
- List of tulu films of 2015
- List of Tulu films of 2014
- List of Released Tulu films
- Tulu cinema
- Category:Actors in Tulu cinema
- Category:Actresses in Tulu cinema
- Karnataka State Film Award for Best Regional film
- RED FM Tulu Film Awards
