= Yesa (disambiguation) =

Yesa is a settlement in Navarre, Spain. It may also refer to:

- La Yesa, a settlement in Valencian Community, Spain
- Pili Yesa, a Karnataka folk dance
- Yesa (film), a 2017 Indian film
- Yesa Reservoir, a dam in Yesa, Navarre
- Yesa robe, ancient type of Chinese clothing
