= Dabak Daba Aisa =

- Directed by: Prakash Pandeshwar
- Produced by: Prakash Pandeshwar
- Starring: Devadas Kapikad; Naveen D. Padil; Bhojaraj Vamanjoor
- Cinematography: Utpal V Nayanar
- Music by: Rajesh M
- Production company: Jayakirana Films
- Release date: 5 August 2016
- Country: India
- Language: Tulu

Dabak Daba Aisa is a 2016 Indian Tulu language comedy film written and directed by Prakash Pandeshwar, Starring Devadas Kapikad, Naveen D. Padil, Bhojaraj Vamanjoor in lead roles. The movie has been produced by Prakash Pandeshwar under the banner of Jayakirana Films.

== Cast ==
- Devadas Kapikad as Jeevan Jeeth Bus driver Devu
- Naveen D. Padil as Jeevan Jeeth bus conductor Naveen
- Bhojaraj Vamanjoor
- Aravind Bolar
- Sundar Rai Mandara
- Umesh Kotian Mijar
- Munju Rai
- Vinay Bhat
- Brijesh Garodi
- Dithesh Poojary
- Jaganaath Shetty Bala
- M Narayanan Nambiar

== Soundtrack ==
Song list

Sr. No	Song name	Music director	Singers	Lyrics
01	Title Track	Rajesh M	Ajay Warrier	Veerendra Shetty Kavoor
02	Heart Da Bus	Rajesh M	Haneef, Nimika Rathnakar	Shashiraj Rao Kavoor
03	Kshana Kshana	Rajesh M	Prajoth D'sa, Nimika Rathnakar	Veerendra Shetty Kavoor
