= Golmaal (2019 film) =

Tulu language film

- Theatrical release poster
- Directed by: Ramanand Nayak
- Written by: Sudheer Shanbhogue
- Produced by: Manjunath Nayak and Akshay Prabhu
- Starring: Pruthvi Ambaar; Sherya Anchan; Sai Kumar (actor, born 1960); Naveen D Padil; Aravind Bolar; Bhojaraj Vamanjoor; Sathish Bandale; Umesh Mijar; Sunder Rai Mandara; Sunil Nelligudde; Sandeep Shetty Manibettu; Prasanna Shetty Bailoor
- Cinematography: Sunaad Gowtham
- Music by: Sunaad Gowtham
- Release date: 19 April 2019
- Country: India
- Language: Tulu

Golmaal is a 2019 Tulu language film directed by Ramanand Nayak starring Pruthvi Ambaar, Sherya Anchan in lead roles and Sai Kumar, Naveen D Padil, Aravind Bolar, Bhojaraj Vamanjoor, Sathish Bandale, Umesh Mijar, Sunder Rai Mandara, Sunil Nelligudde, Sandeep Shetty Manibettu, Prasanna Shetty Bailoor in supporting roles. Golmaal is produced under the banner of Mahakali Mahamanthra Creations by Manjunath Nayak and Akshay Prabhu.

== Cast ==
- Pruthvi Ambaar
- Sherya Anchan
- P. Sai Kumar
- Naveen D Padil
- Aravind Bolar
- Bhojaraj Vamanjoor
- Umesh Mijar
- Sathish Bandale
- Sunder Rai
- Sunil Nelligudde
- Sandeep Shetty Manibettu
- Prasanna Shetty Bailoor

== Soundtrack ==
The soundtracks of the film were composed by Sunaad Gowtham.
