= Ammer Polisa =

- Film poster
- Directed by: Sooraj Shetty
- Written by: Sooraj Shetty
- Produced by: Rajesh Shetty
- Starring: Roopesh Shetty
- Cinematography: Sachin Shetty
- Music by: Sandeep Ballal Background Score - Prasad K Shetty
- Release date: 22 June 2018
- Country: India
- Language: Tulu

Ammer Polisa is an Indian Tulu-language comedy-drama film, directed by K. Sooraj Shetty and released in 2018. Roopesh Shetty and actress Pooja Shetty are the main lead. The film released on 22 June 2018.

== Cast ==
- Roopesh Shetty
- Pooja Shetty
- Rajesh B. Shetty
- Aravind Bolar as Happy
- Sathish Bandale
- Prasanna Shetty
- Sandeep Shetty
- Deepak Paladka
- Deepak Rai
- Vismaya Vinayak as Sharapadipa Sarpe
- Mime Ramdas
- Mimicry Sharan

Pruthvi Ambaar, Sooraj Shetty, and Naveen D. Padil make a guest appearance at the end of the film.

== Soundtrack ==
The soundtrack album features one song composed by Sandeep R Ballal and written by Arjun Lewis.

== Reception ==
A critic from Tulu Cinema called the film "a great comedy entertainer".
