= List of Tulu films of 2024 =

The list of Tulu films that are scheduled to be released in 2024.

== Releases ==
=== January – June ===
Opening		Name	Director	Cast	Ref
JANUARY	12	Mr. Madimaye	Naveen Poojary	Saikrishna Kudla, Shwetha Suvarna, Ravikanth Poojary	
FEBRUARY	23	Mr. Bori	Ravi Kumar Boloor	Dheekshith Shetty, Pavitra Kotian, Pushpa Raj, Pinky Rani, Ravi Kunja, Ranjan Bolar, Pratheek Attavar, Anusha Shetty, Naveen Chandra	
MAY	3	Gabbar Singh	Pradeep B	Sharan Shetty, Wencita Dias, Aravind Bolar, Naveen D Padil, Bhojaraj Vamanjoor	
MAY	24	Balipe	Prasad Poojary Arva	Harshith Bangera, Ankita Patla, Aravind Bolar, Aishwarya Acharya, Pavitha Hegde Pran shetty	
JUNE	14	Tthudarr	Elton Mascarenhas	Siddharth Shetty, Deeksha Bhise, Aravind Bolar, Roopa Vorkady	

=== July – December ===
Opening		Name	Director	Cast	Ref
JULY	5	Dharma Daiva	Nithin Rai Kukkuvalli	Ramesh Rai, Chetan Rai, Greshal Kaliyanda, Deeksha Rai, Roopa Vorkady, Deepak Panaje	
AUGUST	23	Anarkali	Harshith Someshwara	Vijay Shobaraj, Madhura R J, Vathsalya Salian, Naveen D Padil, Aravind Bolar, Deepak Rai Panaje, Ravi Ramakunja	
DECEMBER	13	Daskath	Aneesh Poojary	Naveen Bondel, Deekshith Andinje, Bhavya Poojary, Mohan Shenvi	

== See also ==
- Tulu cinema
- List of Tulu films of 2023
