= Bangar Patler =

1993 Indian romantic drama film

- Theatrical release poster
- Directed by: Dr. Richard Castelino
- Produced by: Dr. Richard Castelino
- Starring: Vaman Raj; Sudha Rani
- Cinematography: Sundarnath Suvarna
- Music by: Ragdev
- Release date: October 15, 1993
- Country: India
- Language: Tulu

Banger Patler (transl. Gold-hearted Patler) is a 1993 Indian Tulu-language romantic drama film directed and produced by Dr. Richard Castelino, starring Vaman Raj in the titular role and Sudha Rani. The film was notably the first Tulu film to be made in Eastman Color and Cinema Scope. It was the first Tulu film to win the National Film Award for Best Feature Film in Tulu.

In February 2021, the film was screened at the 13th Bengaluru International Film Festival as a tribute to fifty years of Tulu cinema.

== Cast ==
- Vaman Raj as Patler
- Sudha Rani
- Kasargod Chinna
- Sarojini Shetty
- Rohidas Kadri
- Sundeep Malani
- V G Pal

== Production and release ==
This is Richard Castelino's second film after Nyayogad Enna Baduk (1979). Rohidas Kadri played the antagonist. Sundeep Malani made his debut through this film playing the antagonist's son.

== Box office ==
The film ran for 105 days in Jyothi Talkies, Mangalore. This was a record till the release of Oriyardori Asal (2011).

== See also ==
- List of Released Tulu films
- Tulu cinema
