= Muthappa Rai =

Indian businessman, former underworld don

N. Muthappa Rai
- Born: Nettala Muthappa Rai Derla; 1 May; Puttur, Karnataka, India
- Died: 15 May 2020; Bangalore, Karnataka, India
- Occupations: Businessman, Gangster
- Spouses: Rekha Rai (?- died.2013); Anuradha (2016 - his death. 2020)
- Parent(s): N. Narayana Rai (Father); Susheela Rai (Mother)

Nettala Muthappa Rai Derla (known as Muthappa Rai (M. R)) (died 15 May 2020) was an Indian underworld don, businessman, philanthropist and a social activist based in Bangalore, Karnataka, India.

== Personal life ==
Rai was born in Puttur, Karnataka, into a Tulu-speaking Bunt family of Nettala Narayana Rai and Susheela Rai. He was married to Rekha and has two sons. His wife Rekha died at Mt Elizabeth Hospital, Singapore in 2013. Rai made his appearance in a Tulu movie Kanchilda Baale in 2011.

Starting his career as a clerk in Vijaya Bank, Muthappa claimed to have accidentally turned to a life of crime in Bengaluru to protect his business — a bar and restaurant — from the onslaught of the underworld in 1980s. He is also the founder of Jaya Karnataka a not-for-profit organisation that aims at improving the quality of life of the people of Karnataka.

== Involvement in crime ==
In the late 1980s, Rai came in contact with Bengaluru’s underworld and became an overnight sensation after he murdered the then don of Bengaluru, M. P. Jayaraj, in broad daylight in 1990. That murder elevated him to the "post" of a mafia boss and he never looked back.

The Karnataka police had issued warrants of arrest against Rai in eight cases under Sections 302 (murder) and 120B (conspiracy) of the Indian Penal Code, the Arms Act and the Explosive Substances Act. The murder of a realtor, Subbaraju, in January 2001 by hired killers from Mumbai followed a dispute over a prime property in Bangalore.

In 2002 he was interrogated by the Central Bureau of Investigation, Research and Analysis Wing, Intelligence Bureau and Karnataka police. Due to lack of substantial information on his career in crime, for allegedly operating extortion rackets, helping property developers, taking possession of land in prime localities and collecting 'protection money' from business houses in Karnataka, through his links with Dawood Ibrahim, he was later acquitted.

== Death ==
In a press meeting in January 2020, Rai had announced that he was diagnosed with brain cancer. He went on to die from brain cancer on 15 May 2020.

== Popular culture ==
A biopic titled Rai on the life of Muthappa Rai is being written and directed by Ram Gopal Varma. It is to be filmed in Mangalore, Bangalore, Mumbai, Dubai and London.
