= Utpal V Nayanar =

Indian filmmaker (born 1959)

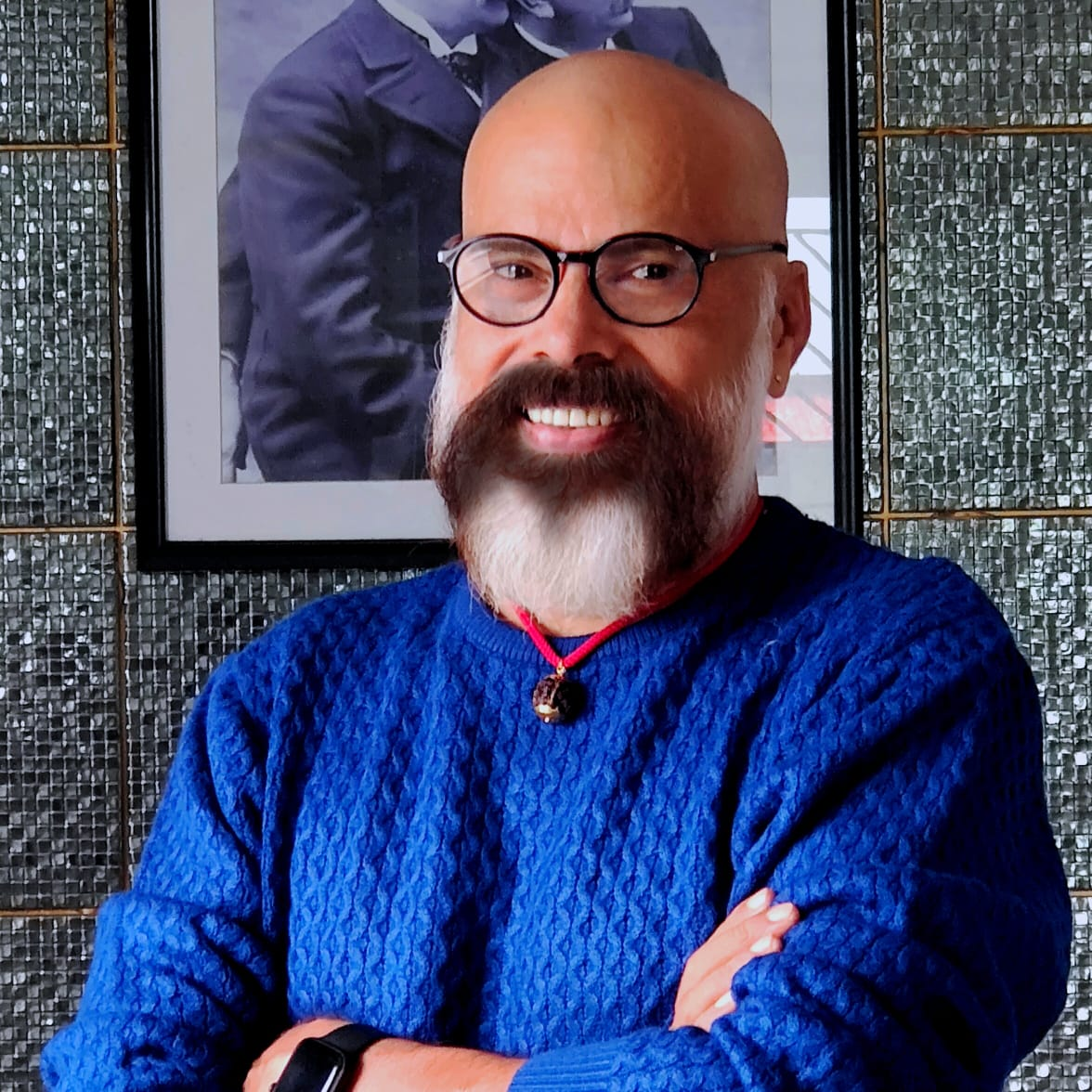
- Nayanar in 2018
- Born: 27 December 1959 (age 66); Kanhangad, Kerala, India
- Occupations: Cinematographer; film director
- Spouse: Latha (m. 1995)

Utpal V Nayanar (born 27 December 1959) is an Indian cinematographer and director, who works predominantly in Malayalam, Tamil and Tulu films. Now he is the joint secretary of MACTA (Malayalam cine technicians association) and CUMAC (Cameraman's union malayalam cinema).

== Career ==
Born in Panayal, Kanhangad, Utpal has contributed significantly to the industry, particularly noted for his work on the 1994 Tamil big-budget film, Pathavi Pramanam, starring Vijayakanth. Utpal's career highlights include his collaboration with Vijayakanth. During the filming of Pathavi Pramanam, Utpal experienced extreme working conditions, including shooting for several days without sleep.

== Filmography ==
Key
†	Denotes films that have not yet been released

Year	Film	Language	Notes
1992	Samundi	Tamil	Debut as cinematographer
1994	Pathavi Pramanam	Tamil	
1995	Kokkarakko	Malayalam	
1995	Minnaminuginum Minnukettu	Malayalam	
1995	Manikya Chembazhukka	Malayalam	
1995	Kakkakkum Poochakkum Kalyanam	Malayalam	
1996	Kinnamkattakallan	Malayalam	
1996	Mookkilla Rajyathu Murimookkan Rajavu	Malayalam	
1997	Kalyanapittennu	Malayalam	
1998	Dhravidan	Malayalam	
1998	Thattakam	Malayalam	
1998	Manthri Kochamma	Malayalam	
1998	British Market	Malayalam	
1998	Sooryaputhran	Malayalam	
1998	Udayapuram Sulthan	Malayalam	
1998	Bharya Veettil Paramasukham	Malayalam	
1998	Pranaya Nilavu	Malayalam	
1998	Captain	Malayalam	
1999	Independence	Malayalam	
2000	Manassil Oru Manjuthulli	Malayalam	
2000	Rapid Action Force	Malayalam	
2001	Aakasathile Paravakal	Malayalam	
2001	En Mana Vaanil	Tamil	
2001	Kattuchembakam	Malayalam	
2001	Saavithriyude Aranjaanam	Malayalam	
2001	Oomappenninu Uriyadappayyan	Malayalam	
2003	Varum Varunnu Vannu	Malayalam	
2003	Sinkaari Bolona	Malayalam	
2004	C. I. Mahadevan 5 Adi 4 Inchu	Malayalam	
2004	Thudakkam	Malayalam	
2005	Maanikyan	Malayalam	
2005	Haai	Malayalam	
2005	Isra	Malayalam	
2005	Pass Pass	Malayalam	
2006	Pathaka	Malayalam	
2006	Rakshakan	Malayalam	
2006	Mauryan	Malayalam	
2007	Sooryan	Malayalam	
2007	Meghatheertham	Malayalam	
2008	Kaalchilambu	Malayalam	
2009	Ee Pattanathil Bhootham	Malayalam	
2010	Unakkaga En Kadhal	Tamil	
2010	Holidays	Malayalam	
2010	Sindhu Samaveli	Tamil	
2010	Again Kasargod Khader Bhai	Malayalam	
2010	Jeevanam	Malayalam	
2011	Pachuvum Kovalanum	Malayalam	
2011	Ujwadu	Konkani	
2012	Steps	Malayalam	
2012	Grihanathan	Malayalam	
2013	Vallatha Pahayan	Malayalam	
2013	Maryade	Kannada	
2014	Friendship	Malayalam	
2014	Chaali Polilu	Tulu	
2015	Nerukkam	Tamil	
2015	Beedi	Tamil	
2016	Dabak Daba Aisa	Tulu	
2017	Nilavariyathe	Malayalam	
2018	Vallikett	Malayalam	
2018	Puzha	Malayalam	
2019	Blue Whale	Malayalam	
2019	Adutha Chodhyam	Malayalam	
2020	Suspence Killer	Malayalam	
2021	Prathi Niraparadhiyanu	Malayalam	
2021	Kannadi	Malayalam	
2022	Akka Kuruvi	Tamil	
2022	Chathi	Malayalam	
