= Soombe =

- Theatrical release poster
- Directed by: Saikrishna Kudla
- Written by: Saikrishna Kudla
- Produced by: Kishor Kottari and Shwetha K Kottari
- Starring: Rahul; Shritama Mukherjee; Devadas Kapikad; Naveen D Padil; Bhojaraj Vamanjoor; Aravind Bolar; Sunder Rai Mandara; Prasanna Bailoor
- Cinematography: P.L.Ravi
- Edited by: Sujith Nayak
- Music by: Edberg Dillon
- Release date: 13 March 2015
- Running time: 150 minutes
- Country: India
- Language: Tulu
- Budget: ₹1 crore (US$100,000)

Soombe is a Tulu language film directed by Saikrishna Kudla starring Rahul, Shritama Mukherjee, Devadas Kapikad, Naveen D Padil, Bhojaraj Vamanjoor, Aravind Bolar, Saikrishna, Prasanna Bailoor, Sunder Rai in lead roles and Sandalwood stars Srinagar Kitty, Bullet Prakash, Vaijanath Biradar in a guest roles. Soombe is produced under the banner of Sri Yajnadhya Productions by Kishor Kottari and Shwetha K Kottari. The film was released on 13 Mar 2015.

== Plot ==
Described as a film within a film, the ‘masala’ story for Soombe revolves around a Kannada producer (Vaijanath Biradar) producing a Tulu cinema. The main theme of the story revolves around a financier who is after the hero (Rahul Amin) to recover the loan given to him. Meanwhile, the hero and heroine (Shritama Mukherjee) who are to perform as a pair in love in the film within film end up being attracted to each other in real life.

== Cast ==
- Rahul Amin
- Shritama Mukherjee
- Devadas Kapikad
- Naveen D Padil
- Bhojaraj Vamanjoor
- Aravind Bolar
- Saikrishna
- Prasanna Bailoor
- Sunder Rai
- Srinagar Kitty
- Bullet Prakash
- Vaijanath Biradar
