= Girgit =

2019 Indian comedy film

- Theatrical release poster
- Directed by: Roopesh Shetty and Rakesh Kadri
- Written by: Roopesh Shetty
- Produced by: Shoolin Films & Manjunath Attavar
- Starring: Roopesh Shetty; Shilpa Shetty; Roshan Shetty; Naveen D Padil; Bhojaraj Vamanjoor; Aravind Bolar; Sandeep Shetty; Prasanna Shetty; Umesh Mijar
- Cinematography: Niranjan Das
- Edited by: Rahul Vasishta
- Music by: Joel Rebello and Darrel Mascarenhas
- Release date: 23 August 2019
- Country: India
- Language: Tulu

Girgit is a 2019 Indian Tulu-language comedy drama film produced by Shoolin Films and Manjunath Attavar. The film was theatrically released in India on 23 August 2019. It stars Roopesh Shetty, Shilpa Shetty, Roshan Shetty, Naveen D Padil, Bhojaraj Vamanjoor, Aravind Bolar, Sandeep Shetty, Prasanna Shetty and Umesh Mijar. The story of the film was written by Roopesh Shetty, and jointly directed by Roopesh Shetty and Rakesh Kadri and became the highest grossing Tulu film of all time.

== Plot ==
A young man falls in love with the girl of his dreams. Eventually, she also falls in love with him, however, as she has many other commitments, he has to face many weird, funny and tough situations in the process of trying to marry her.

== Cast ==
- Roopesh Shetty
- Shilpa Shetty
- Roshan Shetty
- Aravind Bolar
- Naveen D Padil
- Bhojaraj Vamanjoor
- Umesh Mijar
- Sandeep Shetty Manibettu
- Prasanna Shetty

== Music ==
The music was composed by Joel Rebello and Darrel Mascarenhas.

== Release ==
The film was released in the United Arab Emirates on 22 August 2019. The release of the film in Mangaluru was briefly stopped by the court because it showed judges in poor light.

== Reception ==
A critic from Daijiworld.com opined that "A four out of five and a thumbs up for director Roopesh Shetty and Rakesh Shetty for bringing out such a rollercoaster of entertainment. Sometimes, a good laugh is all you need to make your day. Don’t miss this one, because Girgit is a laugh riot".

== Box office ==
The film's box office collection stood at Rs 2 crore worldwide after more than 700 shows.
