= Yesa (film) =

- Film poster
- Directed by: M.N. Jayanth
- Story by: Shobhraj Pavoor
- Produced by: Uday Shetty & Uday Salian
- Starring: Rahul Amin; Radhika Rao; Aravind Bolar
- Cinematography: Mohan Loganathan
- Music by: Guru & Guru
- Release date: 26 May 2017
- Country: India
- Language: Tulu

Yesa is a 2017 Indian Tulu-language film directed by M N Jayanth, Starring Rahul Amin, Radhika Rao, Aravind Bolar, Naveen D Padil, Bhojaraj Vamanjoor, Shobhraj Pavoor in lead roles. The movie has been produced by Uday Shetty and Uday Salian under the banner of U2 Cinema Talkies.

== Cast ==
- Naveen D Padil as Mahabhala Shetty
- Rahul Amin as Abhishek/Rahul
- Radhika Rao as Thanu
- Bhargavi Narayan as Kinyakka
- Aravind Bolar as Jaggu
- Bhojaraj Vamanjoor as Daamu
- Jayarama acharya as Lawyer
