= Jarasandha (film) =

- Jarasandha Poster
- Directed by: Shashank
- Written by: Shashank
- Produced by: B. K. Gangadhar; B. Basavaraj
- Starring: Duniya Vijay; Pranitha; Rangayana Raghu; Devaraj; Roopa Devi; Swayamvara Chandru; Chetan; Naveen D. Padil
- Cinematography: Shekhar Chandra
- Edited by: Sri Crazy Mindz
- Music by: Arjun Janya
- Production company: Sri Manthralaya Combines
- Release date: 25 November 2011
- Running time: 140 minutes
- Country: India
- Language: Kannada

Jarasandha is an Indian Kannada-language action crime film written & directed by Shashank and produced by Sri Manthralaya Combines. It stars Duniya Vijay, alongside Pranitha Subhash, Rangayana Raghu, Devaraj, Sampath Raj, Roopa Devi, Swayamvara Chandru, Chetan and Naveen D. Padil. The music was composed by Arjun Janya, while cinematography and editing were handled by Shekhar Chandra and Sri Crazy Mindz.

== Premise ==
Krishnamurthy "Kitty", a gym instructor instructor in Bangalore, leads a secret life as a gangster and forms a gang called Z with a motive of killing JP alias "Don Poojari", an international crime boss, in order to rule the crime syndicate.

== Cast ==
- Duniya Vijay as Krishamurthy "Kitty" alias "Z"
- Pranitha Subhash as Samantha
- Karthik Jayaram as Ravi, Don Poojari's brother
- Rangayana Raghu as Bull Naidu
- Devaraj as DGP Ajay Deshpande
- Roopa Devi as Sharadamma
- Swayamvara Chandru
- Mallesh Gowda
- Uday K. Mehta
- Danny Kuttappa
- Shashank as a reporter
- Sadashiva Brahmavar
- Chetan Chandra
- Naveen D. Padil
- Vikas
- Sampath Raj as JP alias Don Poojari
- Ramesh Indira
- Manmohan Rai
- Venkata Ram
- Arasu Maharaj
- Ravi Chethan
- Apoorva
- Sharath
- Gopinath Bhat
- Rithesh
- Shankar Narayan

== Production ==
The song "Avarivara Jothe" was shot in the Bidar fort and surroundings of Basavakalyana. With ₹ 70 lakh expenditure, the song was shot featuring Duniya Vijay and Pranitha Subhash. The foreign dancers were part of the song. The film's another song "Padhe Padhe Phoninalli" was shot in four days at Bangkok with a budget of ₹ 40 lakh featuring African dancers. Harsha has choreographed for the songs.

The director and choreographer made the song "Pade Pade Phoninalli" attractive to adult audience by oversexualizing the song and designing revealing and vulgar costumes for the heroine Pranitha Subhash who was just 17 years old during the shooting of the song. When asked about this, Pranitha said, "Sometimes glamour is needed to attract a specific group of audience. In fact, I enjoyed shooting the song, and Vijay sir took great care of me."

The song "Nee Neerige Bare Channi" was based on the Sinhalese song "Mata Aloke Genadevi".

== Soundtrack ==
Jarasandha

Soundtrack album by Arjun Janya
- Released: September 2011
- Genre: Film soundtrack

Tracklist
No.	Title	Singer(s)	Length
1.	"Neerige Baare Chenni"	Arjun Janya, Shamitha Malnad	03:31
2.	"Avarivara Jothe"	Sonu Nigam, Anuradha Bhat	04:13
3.	"Padhe Padhe Phoninalli"	Upendra, Priya Himesh	04:32
4.	"Hale Hubli"	Arjun Janya	04:11
5.	"Yaradru Halagogli"	Kailash Kher, Shashank Sheshagiri, Harshasadananda	03:42

== Reception ==
=== Critical response ===
The Times of India wrote "Director Shashank, known for making movies with social themes, tries his hand at action. Though it’s a good attempt, the director is better off sticking romantic movies." Rediff wrote "Shashank had promised a stylish action flick and with Vijay at the helm, that was what was expected, but the film comes as a disappointment". Bangalore Mirror termed it as "just another underworld film – without substance." The New Indian Express wrote "Jarasandha is worth watching if you are fond of action-oriented films".
