= Oriyardori Asal =

2011 film

- Film poster
- Directed by: H. S. Rajashekar
- Written by: Vijayakumar Kodialbail
- Screenplay by: Vijayakumar Kodialbail
- Story by: Vijayakumar Kodialbail
- Based on: Oriyardori Asal by Vijayakumar Kodialbail
- Produced by: Roopa Vijayakumar Kodialbail
- Starring: Likith Shetty; Ramya Barna; Naveen D Padil; Aravind Bolar; Rekha Das
- Cinematography: P. L. Ravee
- Edited by: Srinivas P. Babu
- Music by: A. K. Vijay (Kokila)
- Production company: Roopalakshmi Films
- Release date: 27 May 2011 (South Karnataka)
- Country: India
- Language: Tulu
- Budget: ₹1 crore (US$100,000)
- Box office: ₹1.5 crore (US$160,000)

Oriyardori Asal (English: One better than the other) is a 2011 Indian Tulu language film directed by H. S. Rajashekar and starring Likith Shetty, Ramya Barna, Naveen D Padil, Aravind Bolar and Rekha Das in the lead roles. It is the most successful Tulu film till date. The film is based on the famous Tulu comedy drama with the same title, written by Vijayakumar Kodialbail. He also wrote the story, screenplay, dialogue and lyrics for the film.

== Plot ==
The film is an out and out comedy and is basically about the misunderstanding between a landlord and his tenants on rent. The film is about a Vattara; homes in the same compound. This particular vattara is about three families living in the same compound. Munna(Likith Shetty) is the protagonist and plays the role of the son of the tenant and Priya (Ramya Barna) plays the role of the house-owner's daughter. The love triangle between Munna and Priya is the central theme of the film. Naveen D Padil has a stellar role as a Bhajane Basappa and Arvind Bolar as a corporator, Kanthappa. Rajesh Bantwal plays the character of a car driver.

== Cast ==
- Likith Shetty as Munna
- Ramya Barna as Priya
- Naveen D Padil as Basappa
- Aravind Bolar as Kanthappa
- Rekha Das
- Santhosh Shetty
- M. N. Lakshmi Devi as Lingamma
- Rajesh Bantwal
- Jayaram Acharya
- Raymond D'souza
- Gurukiran in a special appearance

== Soundtrack ==
The music of the film was composed by AK Vijaya Kokila. The film features the first ever Tulu song by Bollywood singer Udit Narayan. S. P. Balasubrahmanyam also sang for the film, singing for a Tulu film after a gap of seven years. The film also features a song sung by Kannada music director Gurukiran. The audio release of the film was done in a unique way. Magician Kudroli Ganesh collected the petals of the flowers from the dignitaries on the dais and asked the actor and actress of the movie to release the audio CD. The first CD of the film was sold through an auction process which started at ₹ 50 and concluded at ₹ 18,000

== Reception ==
The film turned out to be the biggest hit in Tulu film history till date. The film made good collection in Tulu dominated regions of South Karnataka. The film had a budget of ₹ 1 crore and made a profit of around ₹ 50 lakh. The film ran for more than 175 days. The film received unanimous praise from critics and it was observed that Oriyardori Asal has given a second life to the Tulu film industry.

== List of Tulu Movies ==
- List of Tulu films of 2015
- List of Tulu films of 2014
- List of Released Tulu films
- Tulu cinema
