= K. N. Tailor =

Indian actor and director (1939–2015)

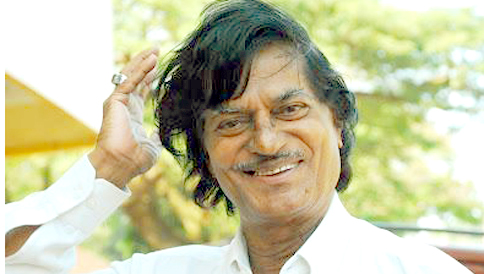
- Born: 1939; Kadandale, Mangalore
- Died: 18 March 2015 (aged 75–76); Mangalore, Karnataka, India
- Occupations: Actor, director, producer

Kadandale Narayana Tailor (1939 – 18 March 2015) was an Indian actor, director and producer in Tulu films.

== Early life and career ==
Tailor was born at Kadandale of Karkala Taluk of Dakshina Kannada district in 1939. From his childhood he had an infatuation for acting in dramas. By profession he was a tailor and his aptitude was for stage activities including acting, directing and producer. He became the proprietor of drama troupe. The Ganesh Natak Sabha which he established in 1958 in Mangalore staged as many as 17 dramas all over the country and abroad and earned a name for him in the field of stage activities.

His performance in the field of Tulu cinema also is significant, and he has been described as "the first 'superstar' of Tulu cinema". He provided script, dialogue, direction and himself acted in as many as nine films. Most popular among them are Yer Malthina Thappu (1974), Dareda Bodedi, Pagetha Puge, Bisathi Babu and Yan Sanyasi Aape. Tailor was mainly responsible for attracting people towards Tulu language, literature and culture through Tulu dramas and cinemas.

== Awards and recognition ==
He has won many regional and state level awards including:

- special state award for Bhagyavanthedi Tulu film in 1982
- Karnataka Natak Academy Award in 1989 and Kannada Rajyotsava Award in 1994
- Karnataka Tulu Sahitya Academy accorded Taylor its 1996–1997 award
- Lifetime Achievement award in 2014, from the Tulu Film Awards
- Taulava Award from the Tulu Nataka Kalavidara Okkoota, for contributions to Tulu theatre
