= Rang (2014 film) =

- Theatrical release poster
- Directed by: Suhan Prasad; Vismaya Vinayak
- Screenplay by: Suhan Prasad – Vismaya Vinayak
- Story by: Suhan Prasad – Vismaya Vinayak
- Produced by: Pramila Dev – Devdas Kumar Pandeshwar
- Starring: Arjun Kapikad; Deekshitha Acharya; Devadas Kapikad; Naveen D Padil; Bhojaraj Vamanjoor; Gopinath Bhat; Satish Bandale
- Cinematography: Sandeep bhattacharya
- Music by: Manikanth Kadri
- Release date: 8 August 2014
- Running time: 2 hrs 35 mins
- Country: India
- Language: Tulu

Rang (transl. Color) is a 2014 Indian Tulu-language film directed by Suhan Prasad and Vismaya Vinayak starring Arjun Kapikad, Deekshitha Acharya, Devadas Kapikad, Naveen D Padil, Bhojaraj Vamanjoor, Gopinath Bhat. Famous Bollywood comedian Johnny Lever appears in guest role. Rang is produced under the banner of Kateeleshwari Combines.

The film was released on 8 August 2014.

== Cast ==
- Arjun Kapikad
- Deekshitha Acharya
- Devadas Kapikad
- Naveen D. Padil
- Bhojaraj Vamanjoor
- Satish Bandale
- Johnny Lever (guest appearance)

== Soundtrack ==
The soundtrack of the film were composed by Manikanth Kadri.

== Reception ==
A critic from Daijiworld Media rated the film four out of five and wrote that "The film is a must watch. No doubt, movies like Rang will take the Tulu film industry to greater heights".
