= Jai (2025 film) =

Indian Kannada-Tulu language political drama film

- Official poster
- Directed by: Roopesh Shetty
- Written by: Venu Hasrali; Roopesh Shetty
- Screenplay by: Roopesh Shetty; Venu Hasralli
- Story by: Prasanna Shetty Bailuru
- Produced by: Shoolin Films; Manjunath Atthavar; Mugrody Productions
- Starring: Roopesh Shetty; Raj Deepak Shetty; Adhvithi Shetty; Suniel Shetty
- Cinematography: Vinuth K Suvarna
- Edited by: Rahul Vasishta
- Music by: Loy Valentine Saldanha
- Production companies: RS Cinemas; Shoolin Films; Mugrody Productions
- Distributed by: KVN Productions
- Release date: 14 November 2025
- Running time: 165 minutes
- Country: India
- Languages: Kannada; Tulu

Jai is a 2025 Indian Kannada-Tulu language political drama film directed and co-written by Roopesh Shetty along with Venu Hasralli. The film produced by RS Cinemas, Mugrody Productions, and Shoolin Films; stars Roopesh Shetty, Raj Deepak Shetty, Adhvithi Shetty, Aravind Bolar, Devadas Kapikad, and Naveen D Padil. Suniel Shetty makes a cameo in his Tulu cinema debut. On 14 November 2025, it was released in Karnataka.

== Plot ==
Satya (Roopesh Shetty), a sharp and loyal young man working for local MLA Vishwanath (Raj Deepak Shetty), lives in Simhabettu village in Coastal Karnataka. Initially indifferent to the village's longstanding issues, including the lack of a bridge and medical facilities, Satya is prompted into action when these problems affect his family. He begins advocating for the welfare of his community, navigating political manipulation and social challenges. The story incorporates elements of humor and a romantic subplot with Shravya (Adhvithi Shetty), while Suniel Shetty delivers a message on accountability and the importance of voting rights.

== Cast ==
- Roopesh Shetty as Satya
- Raj Deepak Shetty as MLA Vishwanath
- Adhvithi Shetty as Shravya
- Devadas Kapikad
- Naveen D Padil
- Aravind Bolar
- Bhojaraj Vamanjoor
- Umesh Mijar
- Sandeep Shetty Manibettu
- Prasanna Shetty Bailur
- Manoj Chethan Dsouza
- Suniel Shetty: Himself, a Cameo.

== Production ==
The film was conceptualized by Roopesh Shetty and co-written with Venu Hasrali, blending comedy with regional pride and socio-political themes.

Principal photography took place in Mangaluru and nearby villages, capturing authentic landscapes, with Vinuth K as cinematographer and Deekshith Alva as editor. In December 2024, the second phase of shooting was completed at various locations around Mangaluru including Kuthar, Dambel, Marakada, Shoolin Palace Maravoor, Bondel, Panambur, and Baikampady.

== Soundtrack ==
Title	Artist	Composer	Lyricist	Label	Length	Ref.
Love You	Rajath Hegde	Loy Valentine Saldanha	Rajeeth Kadri	Anand Audio	3:17	
Jai Anthem	Anthony Daasan, Sherwin Maben	Loy Valentine Saldanha	Rajeeth Kadri	Anand Audio	3:15	
Jai Theme	Promotional song	Loy Valentine Saldanha	Rajeeth Kadri	Anand Audio	3:47	

== Release ==
The film set a record for a Tulu film with 1,020 shows on its opening day. In additional, it was released in Mumbai, Goa, Bahrain, Qatar and Dubai.

== Reception ==
The Times of India rated 3/5 and states that "The film blends a familiar yet engaging tale of grassroots politics, while underscoring the importance of choosing responsible leadership". The New Indian Express states that "This political film bridges messaging and entertainment". Bangalore Mirror states that "The movie is worth a watch for all, especially for Roopesh’s fans". Asianet Suvarna News states that "The film is a story of saving a town against a funny backdrop".

== Box office ==
Within five days, the film's Kannada and Tulu versions amassed ₹5 crore in box office collections. It generated revenue from platform rights and maintained steady viewership over the weeks.
