= Appe Teacher =

- Film poster
- Directed by: Kishor Moodbidri
- Produced by: Rathnakar Kamath
- Starring: Sunil; Devadas Kapikad; Naveen D. Padil; Bhojaraj Vamanjoor; Aravind Bolar; Gopinath Bhat
- Cinematography: Uday Leela
- Edited by: Pradeep Nayak
- Music by: Ravi Basrur
- Production companies: Swayam Prabha Entertainment & Productions
- Release date: 23 March 2018
- Running time: 2 hours 53 minutes
- Country: India
- Language: Tulu

Appe Teacher is a 2018 Indian Tulu-language film directed by Kishor Moodabidre and produced under the banner Swayam Prabha Movies and Entertainment. It marks the directorial debut of the director, who previously had worked for more than 14 movies and serials as an associate director and co-director. In lead roles Devadas Kapikad, Naveen D. Padil, Bhojaraj Vamanjoor, Aravind Bolar, Usha Bhandary, Sathish Bandale, Umesh Mijar feature in supporting roles. The film was a box office success and ran for a hundred days.

== Cast ==
- Sunil
- Devadas Kapikad
- Naveen D. Padil
- Bhojaraj Vamanjoor
- Aravind Bolar
- Gopinath Bhat
- Sathish Bandale
- Usha Bhandary
- Shailashree
- Umesh Mijar
- Niriksha Shetty

== Production ==
The muhurat took place at Mangaluru Town Hall.

== Soundtrack ==
Appe Teacher

Soundtrack album by Vanil Vegas
- Genre: Feature film soundtrack

The soundtrack of the film was composed by Vanil Vegas and background score by Ravi Basrur.

== Release ==
The film was released on 23 March 2018 alongsided Thottil, marking the first time two Tulu films were released on the same date. After a successful run, the film was rereleased in mid-2019 at Jyothi theatre.

== Accolades ==
Award	Date of ceremony	Category	Nominee(s)	Ref.
Cine Galaxy Coastal Film Awards	14 August 2022	Best Screenplay	Kishore Moodabidiri	
Cine Galaxy Coastal Film Awards	14 August 2022	Best Supporting Actress	Usha Bhandary	
Cine Galaxy Coastal Film Awards	14 August 2022	Best Lyricist	Devadas Kapikad	
Cine Galaxy Coastal Film Awards	14 August 2022	Best Debut Actress	Nireeksha Shetty	
Cine Galaxy Coastal Film Awards	14 August 2022	Best Playback Singer Male	Mithun Raj Vidyapur	
Cine Galaxy Coastal Film Awards	14 August 2022	Best Film	Appe Teacher	
