= Pilibail Yamunakka =

PilibalYamunakka
- Directed by: K Sooraj Shetty
- Produced by: Rohan Shetty
- Starring: Pruthvi Ambaar; Sonal Monteiro; Naveen D Padil; Chandrakala
- Cinematography: Keertan Poojary
- Music by: Kishore Kumar Shetty
- Production company: Lakumi Cine Creations
- Release date: 9 December 2016
- Country: India
- Language: Tulu
- Box office: est. ₹2.5 crore (US$260,000)

Pilibail Yamunakka is a 2016 Indian Tulu language film directed by K Sooraj Shetty, starring Pruthvi Ambaar, Sonal Monteiro, Naveen D Padil in lead roles. The movie has been produced by Rohan Shetty under the banner of Lakumi Cine Creations. Audio launch of this film was held on 19 June 2016. The movie released on 9 December 2016. This film successfully completed 168 days. Mangalore's Hip hop singer and rapper YemZii was also first introduced in this movie. He rapped in Tulu, English and Hindi in a song called "Kaar Baar Jorundu" featuring Nakash Aziz.

== Plot ==
Yamunakka, is an 80 year old egoistic lady, living in Pilibail with her family. Gautham, an unemployed man living with his friends in the city, accidentally happens to meet Nisha (Yamunakka's granddaughter), which in turn results in Gautham and his friends relocating to Pilibail. What happens in Pilibail when Yamunakka and Gautham meet is where the story builds up, revealing other suspense around them.

== Cast ==
- Pruthvi Ambaar as Gautham
- Sonal Monteiro as Nisha
- Chandrakala as Yamunakka
- Naveen D. Padil
- Aravind Bolar
- Bhojaraj Vamanjoor
- Sathish Bandale

== Soundtrack ==
Pilibail Yamunakka

Soundtrack album by Kishore Kumar Shetty
- Released: 19 June 2016 (India)
- Genre: Feature film soundtrack
- Length: 19:58
- Label: Zee Music South
- Producer: Kishore Kumar Shetty

The music was composed by Kishore Kumar Shetty. In a music review, a critic from Tulu Cinema wrote, "Overall, Kishore Kumar Shetty's Pilibail Yamunakka album is melodious and fab[ulous]".

All lyrics are written by Mayur R Shetty.

Track listing
No.	Title	Singer(s)	Length
1.	"Title Track"	Prakash Mahadevan	3:22
2.	"Mayakadonji"	Patla Satish Shetty	3:31
3.	"Cheepedha Naal Padha"	Shreya Ghoshal, Kunal Ganjawala	4:35
4.	"Yeregaavye Kiri Kiri"	Aman Trikha, Prakash Mahadevan	3:53
5.	"Kar Baar Jorundu"	Nakash Aziz, YemZii	4:37
Total length:			19:58

== Reception ==
A critic from Tulu Cinema wrote, "Overall, Pilibai Yamunakka is a well-made story combination of romance and comedy".

== Accolades ==
Award	Category	Nominee	Result	Ref.
RED FM Tulu Film Awards	Best Actor	Pruthvi Ambaar	Won	
RED FM Tulu Film Awards	Best Film	Pilibail Yamunakka	Won	
RED FM Tulu Film Awards	Best Director	K Sooraj Shetty	Won	
