= Daijiworld Media =

Indian media company

Daijiworld Media Pvt Ltd
- Company type: Pvt. Ltd. Company
- Website type: web portal
- Available in: English
- Founded: 14 January 2001; 25 years ago
- Headquarters: Mangalore, India
- Key people: Walter Nandalike (Managing Director)
- Industry: Electronic paper, online news
- Products: News & Information
- Employees: 90 ml
- Website: www.daijiworld.com
- Registration: optional
- Launched: 14 January 2001; 25 years ago

Daijiworld Media is an Indian company, headquartered in Mangalore, that provides news services, including the web portal, www.daijiworld.com. It was founded by Walter Nandalike, as www.daijidubai.com on 14 January 2001, primarily with the objective of relaying news from the Coastal Konkan region of India. It was later renamed as www.daijiworld.com, and established as a media company in 2007.

Daijiworld runs Daijiworld 24x7 TV channel, which was launched on 9 May as test transmission, telecast from 16 June 2014 across coastal Karnataka through cable network and set-top boxes. The TV channel is also available on Internet and also in Android and IOS app formats.

== History ==
Daijiworld Media was a result of an April Fools' Day prank by Walter Nandalike, the now Editor-in-chief of the portal. He had migrated to the Gulf for employment, with no knowledge of computers. Having learnt about computers, he sent his first E-mail to his friends on 1 April 2000, mentioning that he was hosting a site on the Internet. This was just meant to be a joke, but his friends took him seriously and started enquiring about the site. Surprised by their curiosity, Walter started thinking seriously about the project. He learnt computers thoroughly, and eight months later, on 14 January 2001, launched www.daijidubai.com, primarily with the objective of hosting information and news pertaining to Konkani language and society. The portal is now known as www.daijiworld.com Daiji in Konkani means "relation", and the portal was started by Walter and a group of writers of the Daiji Dubai Writers Forum with a view to promote and spread awareness of culture and tradition.

In March 2007, it established itself as a media company under the banner of "Daijiworld Media Pvt Ltd". In order to cater to the increasing demand for news from India by the NRIs, an exclusive office was opened in Kankanady, Mangalore with 40 correspondents spread across the twin districts of Dakshina Kannada and Udupi. On 18 July 2008, Daijiworld took a step further and inaugurated its Udupi office.

In May 2014, Daijiworld moved to its own corporate office at Bondel, Mangalore.
