= Nemoda Boolya =

- Directed by: B. K. Gangadhar Kirodian
- Written by: B. K. Gangadhar Kirodian
- Based on: Parati-Mangani Paddana
- Produced by: K Chandrashekar Mada
- Starring: Preetham Shetty Kadar; Rajani
- Cinematography: Umapathi
- Music by: V. Manohar
- Production company: Kudradi Kuladevata Creation
- Release date: 22 September 2017
- Country: India
- Language: Tulu

Nemoda Boolya is a Tulu language drama film based on the true story Parati-Mangani Paddana that took place 200 years ago in Bettampady near Puttur, later made into a drama of the same name. It was written and directed by B. K. Gangadhar Kirodian, and starred Preetham Shetty Kadar, Rajani in lead roles. The movie was produced by K Chandrashekar Mada under the banner of Kudradi Kuladevata Creation. Audio launch of this film was on 26 June 2016. The film was released on 22 September 2017.

== Cast ==
- Preetham Shetty Kadar as Mynda
- Rajani as Parati Mangane
- Pradeepchandra Udupi as Annappa Ballala
- Ramesh Bhat
- Mandya Ramesh
- V. Manohar
- Raghuram Shetty

== Soundtrack ==
The music for the film was composed by V. Manohar, who also wrote the lyrics.

- "Poojalle Mudithondu" - Faneendra Krishna, Nagachandrika
- "O Madanalokada Madimale" - Badriprasad
- "Le Leyo Leyo" - Nagachandrika Bhat
- "Kanned Netharenjandi" - Chintan Vikas
- "Daivono Nambodu" - Shashank Sheshagiri, Denna
- "Denna Dennana Denna" - Prathima Bhat.
