= Pingara =

2020 Tulu-language film

- Official poster
- Directed by: Preetham Shetty
- Produced by: Avinash U Shetty
- Starring: Neema Ray; Sharan Shetty
- Release date: 2020 (Bengaluru International Film Festival)
- Country: India
- Language: Tulu

Pingara (transl. Areca flowers) is a 2020 Indian Tulu language film directed by Preetham Shetty. The film was released in film festivals.

== Cast ==
- Neema Ray as Malli
- Sharan Shetty
- Usha Bandari as Dodda
- Guruprasad Hegde as Mahabala
- Chaitanya Chandramohan as Sinchana

== Reception ==
A critic from The News Minute opined that "Overall, Pingara is a good attempt at making a socially conscious film".

== Awards ==
- 67th National Film Awards — Best Feature Film in Tulu
- Bengaluru International Film Festival - International Jury Award
- Network for the Promotion of Asian Cinema - International Judges Award
