= Sompa (film) =

- Directed by: Rajan Lyallpuri
- Written by: Rajan Lyallpuri
- Story by: Ajathashatru
- Produced by: Namratha Hegde Productions
- Starring: Arvind Bolar; Namratha Hegde; Ajathashatru; Sadashiv Amrapurkar
- Music by: Iqbal Darbar
- Release date: 31 August 2012 (South Karnataka)
- Running time: 130 minutes
- Country: India
- Language: Tulu

Sompa is a 2012 Indian Tulu-language comedy film directed by Rajan Lyallpuri and produced by Namratha Hegde Productions, starring Sadashiv Amprapurkar, Aravind Bolar, Ajathashatru and Namratha Hegde. The comedy is set in Mangalore, and marks the first appearance of veteran Indian actor Sadashiv Amrapurkar in a Tulu film.

The film's working title was Raampa, named after Ramappa Poojary, a hotelier. Before the film was released, the title had been changed to Sompa, following objections from the Poojary family.

== Cast ==
- Namratha Hegde
- Sadashiv Amrapurkar
- Ajathashatru
- Aravind Bolar
- Ravi Surathkal
- Prabhakar Shetty
- Chandravati Vasanth
- Shashiraj Kavoor
- Shobha Shetty

== Soundtrack ==
The music of the film was composed by Iqbal Darbar. After a series of Bollywood hits he has now composed songs for his first Tulu film sung by Dr. Nitin Acharya, winner of the Voice of Bangalore contest held in Bangalore, Karnataka.
