= Kadala Mage =

- Directed by: Praveen Jain
- Screenplay by: Krishna Prasad, Mithun Prasad
- Story by: Krishna Prasad, Mithun Prasad
- Produced by: Sadhana N Shetty
- Starring: Bhavya; Diganth; Soorya; Sarita Jain
- Cinematography: Suresh Babu
- Edited by: Shyam
- Music by: S. P. Chandrakanth (Lyrics by: Vijay Kumar Kodialbail)
- Production company: Bhramari Creations
- Release date: 15 August 2006
- Running time: 2hr 30mins
- Country: India
- Language: Tulu

Kadala Mage (transl. Son of the sea) is a 2006 Indian Tulu-language romantic drama film directed by Praveen Jain and starring Bhavya, Diganth (in his Tulu debut), Soorya, and Sarita Jain in the lead roles. The film was a box office success and won the Karnataka State Film Award for Best Regional Film.

== Plot ==
Karna hails from the Marakala fisherman community and lives with his family on the seaside. Arun is a college-goer and is spoiled rich brat. He mistakes Anjali's friendship with him for love. They both go to the seaside where they meet Karna. Anjali falls in love with Karna, who does not reciprocate her love. In an unfortunate incident, Karna becomes impoverished whereas Arun tries to reform himself. What happens to Karna and who Anjali chooses forms the rest of the story.

== Cast ==
- Bhavya
- Diganth as Arun
- Soorya as Karna
- Sarita Jain as Anjali
- Rajesh Bantwal
- Bhojaraj Vamanjoor
- Lakshman
- Kumar Mallur
- Sarojini Shetty
- Ila Vitla
- Rohini Jagaram
- Santosh Shetty
- Ramdas Devadiga
- Manmohan Rai
- Dayanand Kulal Urwa
- Subrahmanya
- Shrilanjan Marakada
- Chandrashekhar Siddakatte
- Rajkumar Tonse
- Anisha Kulal
- Suresh Mangalore
- Krishna Bappal
- Vasanti Poojari
- Winny Fernandes
- Ubaid Udupi

== Production ==
Saritha Jain, who worked in Chellata (2006), made her lead debut through this film after the makers of the film saw her photographs on a website. The film is about the Marakala (Mogaveera in Kannada) fishing community in coastal Karnataka, and was shot in Bennekudru, Kaup, Malpe, Mattu, Manipal, and Udupi.

== Music ==
The music was composed by S. P. Chandrakanth and was released under the Satyam Music audio label.

== Release ==
The film was released in Mangalore and Udupi on 15 August 2006. The film was not released on CDs.
