= Kudla Cafe =

- Theatrical release poster
- Directed by: Surya Menon
- Produced by: Surya Menon; Ranjan Shetty
- Starring: Jyothish Shetty; Naveen D Padil; Raghu Pandeshwar; Aahana Kumra; Shine Shetty
- Cinematography: Saleel Pathak
- Edited by: Aksshay Mehta
- Music by: Umang; Akaash Prajapathi
- Production company: Yodha Motion Pictures
- Release dates: 3 February 2016 (Bengaluru International Film Festival); 12 February 2016 (Mangaluru)
- Country: India
- Language: Tulu

Kudla Cafe is a 2016 Indian Tulu-language film directed by Surya Menon. The star cast of the film includes Jyothish Shetty, Naveen D Padil, Raghu Pandeshwar, Aahana Kumra, Shaine Shetty, Santhosh Shetty, Sudhir Raaj Urva, Ashok Shetty, Kishore Kottari, Bantwal Jayaramachaar, Thimmappa Kulal, Bhavani Shankar, Shashiraaj Kavoor, Manoj Puttur, Shruthi Shetty, Anusha Kotian, Sanam Amin, Karthik Kotian, Suraj Sanil and Naveen Shetty Mijar in lead roles. The film has been produced by Ranjan Shetty and Surya Menon under the banner of Yodha Motion Pictures.

Kudla Cafe premiered at the 8th Bengaluru International Film Festival on 2 February 2016. The film was released in Mangaluru on 12 February 2016.

== Plot ==
During a reunion, three friends realise at the funeral of their Kabaddi coach that a loan shark has other plans for the grounds. Their coach used to own a cafe, which is now run by his grandson and the three friends attempt to save the cafe.

== Cast ==
- Jyothish Shetty
- Naveen D. Padil
- Raghu Pandeshwar
- Aahana Kumra
- Shine Shetty
- Santosh Shetty
- Sudhir Raj Urwa
- Manoj Puttur

== Accolades ==
Karnataka State Film Awards

- Best Supporting Actor - Naveen D. Padil
