= Chaali Polilu =

- Theatrical release poster
- Directed by: Veerendra Shetty Kavoor
- Written by: Veerendra Shetty Kavoor
- Produced by: Prakash Pandeshwar
- Starring: Devadas Kapikad; Naveen D Padil; Bhojaraj Vamanjoor
- Cinematography: Utpal V Nayanar
- Music by: V. Manohar
- Release date: 31 October 2014
- Running time: 155 minutes
- Country: India
- Language: Tulu

Chaali Polilu is a 2014 Indian Tulu language film directed by Virendra Shetty Kavoor starring Devadas Kapikad, Naveen D Padil and Bhojaraj Vamanjoor. It was produced under the banner of Jayakirana films by Prakash Pandeshwar. It was the highest grossing Tulu film upon release.

The film was shown for 511 days in PVR Cinemas, a record in Tulu cinema, as well as for any regional-language film in India.

== Plot ==
The first half of the film tells about three main characters Pandu (Devadas Kapikad), Damu (Naveen D Padil) and Manju (Bhojaraj Vamanjoor). They are childhood best friends and stay in same neighbourhood. They are characterized as naughty and uninterested in studies. They are unemployed and do not do any work. The trio are called 'Chaali Polilu' by the people in the area.

Everything seems to be going on fine in their life until one day they are accused of stealing ornaments from the sanctum sanctorum in the village temple. The second half focuses on if they get out of the problem and how they solve it.

== Cast ==
- Devadas Kapikad as Pandu
- Naveen D Padil as Damu
- Bhojaraj Vamanjoor as Manju
- Divyashree
- Aravind Bolar as Babanna
- Navya
- Arjun Kapikad (Guest appearance)
- Sunder Rai
- Chethan Rai
- Padmaja Rao
- Prasanna Shetty
- Prajwal Pandeshwar
- Deepak Balan
- Prajnesh Shetty
- Dithesh Poojary
- Brijesh Garodi
- Ravindra Shetty Kuthethure
- Jaganaath Shetty Bala
- Umanatha Kotian

== Production ==
As of mid-2014, the dubbing work of the film was complete.

== Soundtrack ==
The soundtracks of the film were composed by V. Manohar. Music was released by Muzik247 Tulu.

== Box office ==
Chaali Polilu crossed ₹1 crore in box office collection in just three weeks, breaking all previous box office records. The film has so far collected around ₹2 crores at the box office.

== Awards ==
Tulu Cinemotsava Awards 2015

- Best Film
- Best Director- Virendra Shetty Kavoor
- Best Actor - Naveen D Padil
- Best Actress - Divyashree
- Best Actor in a Negative Role- Chethan Rai
- Best Music Director - V.Manohar
- Best Editor - P C Mohanan
- Best Choreography- Cool Jayanth
