= Barke (film) =

2014 Indian film by Bharath Krishna

- Directed by: Bharath Krishna
- Written by: Bharath Krishna
- Screenplay by: Bharath Krishna
- Produced by: Suresh Reddy
- Starring: Ashwin Shetty, Srikanth, Balachandra, Nagaraj Ambar, Riya Meghana
- Cinematography: Mutturaj
- Music by: Yashavardhana
- Production company: Sri Renuka Chitra
- Distributed by: Madman Dreams Entertainment Studio
- Release date: 14 February 2014
- Country: India
- Language: Tulu

Barke is a 2014 Indian Tulu language film directed by Bharath Krishna and produced by Suresh Reddy. It stars Ashwin Shetty, Srikanth, Balachandra, Pruthvi Ambaar (credited as Nagaraj Ambar) and Riya Meghana in the lead roles. Krishna also wrote the screenplay for the movie. The film is based on a true story.

== Cast ==
- Ashwin Shetty
- Srikanth
- Balachandra
- Nagaraj Amber
- Riya Meghana

== Release ==
The film was released on 14 February 2014.
