= Ice Cream (2015 film) =

- Directed by: Venugopal Shetty; Pritham Sagar
- Produced by: Navitha Jain; Pritham Sagar
- Starring: Roopesh Shetty; Anvitha Rao
- Cinematography: Rajesh Haleyangadi
- Music by: Madan Mohan
- Release date: 20 November 2015
- Running time: 140 minutes
- Country: India
- Language: Tulu

Ice Cream is a 2015 Indian Tulu-language thriller film directed by Venu Gopal Shetty and Pritham Sagar. Roopesh Shetty and Anvitha Rao star in the lead roles. The film was reported to be the first suspense and thriller film to be made in Tulu.

== Cast ==
- Roopesh Shetty
- Anvitha Rao
- Dayanand Kukkaje
- Dinesh Attavar
- Manohar Prasad
- Arunchandra B.C.Road
- Chethan Rai Mani
- Rohini Jagaram
- Prasad Shakthinagar
- Vijay Mayya
- Narayan Shabaraya
- Mimicry Sharan
- Harish Kadandale
- M. Shivaprakash

== Soundtrack ==
The soundtrack of the film was composed by Madhan Mohan and background score by Giridhar Dhiwan. The soundtrack album was released on 20 August 2015.

== Release ==
The release of the film was delayed several times. The film was first scheduled to release in September, then 16 October before finally deciding on the 20 November 2015 release date.
