= Umil =

Tulu movie

- Directed by: Ranjith Suvarna
- Written by: Ranjith Suvarna
- Produced by: Prajnesh Shetty, Karunakara Shetty, Prajwal Shetty
- Starring: Umesh Mijar; Naveen D Padil; Aravind Bolar
- Edited by: Harish Kodpadi
- Music by: Ravi Basrur
- Distributed by: Bhavani Film Makers
- Release date: 7 December 2018
- Country: India
- Language: Tulu

Umil is a 2018 Indian Tulu-language film directed by Ranjith Suvarna starring Umesh Mijar in lead role and Naveen D Padil, Aravind Bolar, Bhojaraj Vamanjoor, Chethan Rai Mani, Sathish Bandale and Deepak Rai in prominent roles. Ravi Basrur composed the music of the movie. The movie was released on 7 December 2018.

The movie was produced by Karunakar Shetty and Prajnesh.

== Cast ==
- Umesh Mijar
- Naveen D Padi
- Aravind Bolar
- Bhojaraj Vamanjoor
- Chethan Rai Mani
- Sathish Bandale
- Deepak Rai
- Pooja Shetty

== Soundtrack ==
The music was composed by Ravi Basrur. For the first time, Kannada actor Puneeth Rajkumar has rendered his voice for a Tulu song.

Track listing
No.	Title	Lyrics	Singer(s)	Length
1.	"Ravond Ravond Bathund Umil"	Keerthan Bandary	Puneeth Rajkumar
2.	"Per Paper Kanayere Poye"	Keerthan Bandary	Arjun Kapikad, Vaishnavi Udupi
3.	"Iniye Yenna Last Nint"	Keerthan Bandary	Aravind Bolar
4.	"Chotu Chotu"	Prashanth CK	Umesh Mijar, Vidyashree Acharya
Total length:				13:46
