= Ekka Saka =

- Theatrical release poster
- Directed by: K Sooraj Shetty
- Produced by: Ln Kishore D shetty, Ln Chandrahas shetty, Ln girish Shetty
- Starring: Hitesh Naik; Sonal Monteiro; Naveen D Padil; Bhojaraj Vamanjoor; Aravind Bolar; Tennis Krishna; Achyuth Kumar; Umanath Kotian; Padmaja Rao; Sudha Belavadi; Sathish Bandale; Shobharaj; Chaitra Shetty
- Cinematography: Krishna Sarathi
- Edited by: K.R lingaraj
- Music by: Ravi Basrur
- Release date: 1 May 2015
- Running time: 120 mins
- Country: India
- Language: Tulu

Ekka Saka - Inchane Kasta Suka is a 2015 Tulu language film, directed by K. Sooraj Shetty and produced by Lion Kishore D. Shetty for Lukumi Cine Creations. It stars Hitesh Naik and Sonal Monteiro. The film was released on 1 May 2015.

== Plot ==
Prashant (Hitesh Naik), who has been looking after his father's money lending business, falls in love at first sight with Divya (Sonal Monteiro) on the college campus. He asks Divya to marry him. A few days after they meet, she asks him to convince her parents, who oppose the marriage. The couple asks Gopal (Naveen D Padil) for help to get married, but unforeseen events happen.

== Cast ==
- Hitesh Naik as Prashanth
- Sonal Monteiro as Divya
- Aseer Sheik
- Naveen D Padil as Gopal
- Bhojaraj Vamanjoor
- Tennis Krishna
- Aravind Bolar as Gunanath
- Achyuth Kumar
- Padmaja Rao
- Umanath Kotian
- Sudha Belawadi
- Sathish Bandale
- Shobhraj Pavoor
- Chaitra Shetty as Shilpa
- Ravi Surathkal
- Sundar Rai Mandara
- Chandrahas Kadri
- Sandeep Shetty
- Prasanna Shetty
- Shobha Rai
- Raghavendra Rai
- Pradeep Alva
- Umesh Mijar

== Soundtrack ==
The soundtrack of the film was composed by Ravi Basrur, the composer for the film Ugramm.

== Production ==
Production for the film started on 1 December 2014 when its muhurat shot took place. The film was released on 1 May 2015 in 11 theatres across Karnataka.
