= Pattanaje (film) =

Pattanaje Tulu Film

- Directed by: Thonse Vijay Kumar
- Screenplay by: Thonse Vijay Kumar
- Produced by: Kala Jagattu Creations
- Starring: Shivadhwaj, Surya Rao; Reshma Shetty; Kaajal Kunder
- Cinematography: Suresh Babu
- Edited by: Sujith Nayak
- Music by: V. Manohar
- Release date: 1 September 2017
- Country: India
- Language: Tulu

Pattanaje is a 2017 Indian Tulu language film directed and Produced by Thonse Vijay Kumar Shetty, under the banner of KalaJagattu Creations. The film stars Shivadhwaj, Surya Rao, Reshma Shetty and Kaajal Kunder in main roles. Senior actors Chethan Rai, Mani, Sundar Rai, Mandara, Praveen Markame and Sita Kote also acted in the movie.

== Plot ==
In the film, the heroine is born on "Pattanaje" day. The story revolves around the sudden developments in her life. It also focuses on discrimination, atrocities and social issues. It shows how the heroine deals with them with the help of the rich cultural background of the region.

== Cast ==
- Shivadhwaj
- Surya Rao
- Kaajal Kunder
- Prateek Shetty
- Reshma Shetty
- Chethan Rai, Mani
- Sundar Rai, Mandar
- Praveen Markame

== Production ==
The film is produced by Kala Jagattu Creations and shot around Mangalore and Udupi.

== Music ==
Audio launch function of movie held at London during the Tulu Community UK's annual get together event. V. Manohar has composed the music. Sunita Shetty, Bhaskar Rai Kukkuvalli, Navneet Shetty Kadri and Dinakar Pachanadi have written the lyrics.

== Release ==
The film was released on 1 September 2017.
