= Sandeep Shetty =

Indian actor

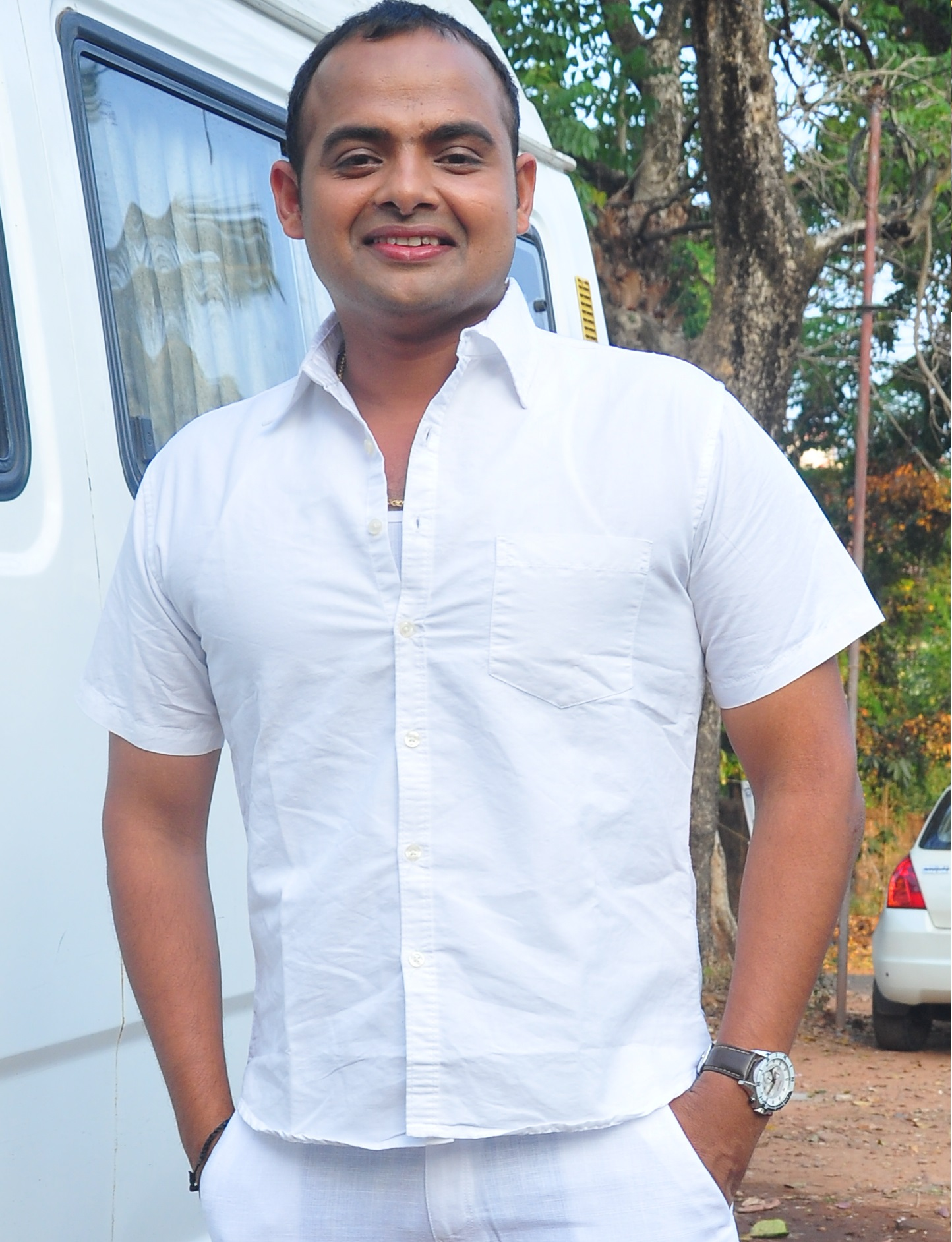
- Sandeep Shetty during Dhand (film) shoot
- Born: 23 July; Udupi, Karnataka, India
- Occupations: Actor; film director; screenwriter
- Years active: 2014

Sandeep Shetty (born 23 July) is an Indian actor known for his roles in Tulu Cinemas like Dhand, Madime, Ekka Saka and many Dramas and stage performances. He, along with his team, Prashamsa won Bale Telipale, a stand-up comedy contest show on Namma TV for three consecutive years in Coastal Karnataka. Sandeep has performed more than 1000 stage shows in international locations such as Muscat, Dubai, Kuwait and Bahrain, as well as locations within India including Bengaluru, Mumbai and Pune.

== Early life ==
Sandeep Shetty was born on 23 July at Manibettu a place next to Shirva village of Udupi District. Sandeep, who holds BBM and MBA degrees, is the son of Sunder Shetty and Rathna Shetty. Sandeep started his acting career in 1998, writing and directing a Tulu drama titled 'Nathuna Paru'.

== Filmography ==
Year	Film	Role	Ref.
2008	Telikeda Bolli	Gangster	
2014	Madime		
2015	Ekka Saka	Driver	
2015	Dhand	Sandeep	
2015	Right Bokka Left		
2015	Eregla Panodchi		

== Awards ==
- 2015 - Bale Telipale Winner Prashamsa Team
- 2014 - Bale Telipale Winner Prashamsa Team
- 2013 - Bale Telipale Winner Prashamsa Team
- 'Kusalda Birse' - By Mumbai Kalabhimanigalu
- 'Janamechida Hasya Nata' award in Puttur drama competition.
