= Nirel =

- Promotional poster
- Directed by: Ranjith Bajpe
- Written by: Ranjith Bajpe (dialogues)
- Screenplay by: Karthik Gowda
- Story by: Karthik Gowda
- Produced by: Shodhan Prasad
- Starring: Anoop Sagar; Varuna Shetty; Deepthi Salian
- Cinematography: Mani Kookal Nair
- Edited by: Ashwath Samuel
- Music by: Abhishek S. N.
- Production companies: Sandhya Creations; Colorbar Productions
- Release date: 7 March 2014
- Country: India
- Language: Tulu

Nirel (transl. Shadow) is a 2014 Indian Tulu-language film directed by Ranjith Bajpe starring Anoop Sagar, Varuna Shetty, and Deepthi Sailan. This will be the first Tulu film produced overseas and shot completely in the Gulf region.

The film is based on the Kannada Script "Nadu Naduve" by Karthik Gowda and later converted to Tulu by Ranjith Bajpe. Karthik Gowda also wrote the screenplay for the movie, and dialogues written by Ranjith Bajpe. The people behind Nirel is a group of four friends, San Poojary, Ranjith Bajpe, Rajneesh Amin and Sachin Padil.

== Plot ==
The film revolves around 3 main characters, played by Anoop Sagar as Sachin, Varuna as Rashmi & Deepthi as Shweta. Anoop is an engineer by profession but wants to be a film hero by passion. Varuna is an to-day independent girl and works as a banker for one of the banking organizations of Dubai. Deepthi plays a family friend to Anoop Sagar. The film deals about how the trio are linked, what happens when ambition, passions, likes, dislikes, over reactive nature comes ahead of relationships and other things. Told with a comical touch, the film then divulges to an emotional yet romantic tale.

== Cast ==
- Ramesh Aravind as himself (special appearance)
- Andria D'Souza as herself (special appearance)
- Chilly Willy Satish (special appearance)
- Shodhan Prasad (special appearance)
- San Poojary (special appearance)
- Anoop Sagar as Sachin
- Varuna Shetty as Rashmi
- Deepthi Salian as Shweta
- Sachin Padil
- Deepak Paladka
- Rajendra Pai
- Vidya
- Nindiya Prasad
- Ashok Palan
- Subhash
- Vishwapathi Bhat
- Anand Salian
- Sandhya Prasad

== Production ==
A team of 4 young guys, San Poojary, Ranjith Bajpe, Rajneesh Amin and Sachin Padil came together and planned to produce a youth oriented Tulu movie with fresh concept. They approached Shodhan Prasad and he agreed to produce the movie under Sandhya Creations. Since the crew was busy working, the film was only shot on Fridays.

The film was entirely shot abroad, with no scenes — including indoor or studio shots — filmed in India. Principal photography took place in Dubai, Abu Dhabi, Sharjah and Ajman. In May, Ramesh Aravind acted in a guest role.

== Soundtrack ==
Music composed by Abhishek S. N. and released by Muzik247 Tulu. One song received 60,000 views upon release.

Song list

| Sr. No | Song name | Singers | Lyrics |
|---|---|---|---|
| 01 | Genduna Saadi Terina | Pramod Kumar, Shilpa M | Loku Kudla |
| 02 | Daane Enna Manass | Abhishek S. N | Rajneesh Amin |
| 03 | Serrnaga Ee Manass | Akshatha Rao | Loku Kudla |
| 04 | Daye Enan Bududu | Shiv Kumar | Shilpa M | Rajneesh Amin |
| 05 | Balcony Item | Akshatha Rao | Loku Kudla |
| 06 | Mokeda Singari - Revisited | Harish Sherigar | Seetharam Kulal |

== Release ==
The film was released on 25 April 2014 in Bahrain and 6 June 2014 in Kuwait.

== Awards ==
Tulu Cinemotsava Awards 2015

- Best Film
- Best Supporting Actress - Deepthi Salian
- Best Cameraman - Mani Kookal
- Best Story - Karthik Gowda

RED FM Tulu Film Awards

- Special Award for First International Movie
