= Chandi Kori =

Chandikori
- Film poster
- Directed by: Devadas Kapikad
- Written by: Devadas Kapikad
- Produced by: Sharmila Kapikad; Sachin Sunder
- Starring: Arjun Kapikad; Karishma Amin; Devadas Kapikad; Naveen D. Padil; Bhojaraj Vamanjoor; Aravind Bolar; Gopinath Bhat.
- Cinematography: P. L. Ravi
- Edited by: Sujith Nayak
- Music by: Devadas Kapikad Background score Manikanth Kadri
- Production company: Bolli Movies
- Release date: 25 September 2015
- Running time: 140 minutes
- Country: India
- Language: Tulu

Chandi Kori is a 2015 Indian Tulu film directed by Devadas Kapikad also appearing in a supporting role. Arjun Kapikad and Karishma Amin star in lead roles, and Naveen D. Padil, Bhojaraj Vamanjoor, Gopinath Bhat and Aravind Bolar feature in supporting roles. The film successfully completed 100 days in Mangalore and Udupi. The film was produced by Sharmila Kapikad and Sachin Sunder.

== Cast ==
- Arjun Kapikad
- Karishma Amin
- Devadas Kapikad
- Naveen D. Padil
- Bhojaraj Vamanjoor
- Aravind Bolar
- Gopinath Bhat
- Chethan Rai
- D. S. Boloor
- Sarojini Shetty
- Shobha Rai
- Sumithra Rai
- Manisha
- Sujatha
- Thimmappa Kulal
- Suresh Kulal

== Soundtrack ==
Chandi Kori

Soundtrack album by Devadas Kapikad
- Released: 20 August 2015
- Genre: Feature film soundtrack
- Label: Anand Audio

The soundtrack of the film was composed by Devadas Kapikad and the film's score was composed by Manikanth Kadri. The soundtrack album was released on 20 August 2015 with the Anand Audio acquiring the audio rights.

Track listing
No.	Title	Lyrics	Singer(s)	Length
1.	"Porlu Tulunadu"	Devadas Kapikad	Devadas Kapikad
2.	"Udaya Udaya"	Devadas Kapikad	Madhu Balakrishnan
3.	"Mattda Ponne"	Devadas Kapikad	Arjun Kapikad, Apoorva Sridhar
4.	"Madirangi Manjaal"	Devadas Kapikad	Manikanth Kadri
