= Madime =

- Theatrical release poster
- Directed by: Vijaykumar Kodialbail
- Written by: Vijaykumar Kodialbail
- Produced by: Megina Malady Balakrishna Shetty
- Starring: Likith Shetty; Ramya Barna; Bhojraj Vamanjoor; Chethan Rai; Usha Bhandari
- Cinematography: Guruprashanth Rai
- Edited by: Srinivas Prabhu
- Music by: A.K. Vijay
- Release date: 20 November 2014
- Country: India
- Language: Tulu

Madime (Wedding) is a Tulu language film directed by Vijaykumar Kodialbail starring Likith Shetty and Ramya Barna in lead roles. Madime is produced by Megina Malady Balakrishna Shetty.

The movie was reported to be remade in Marathi, thereby becoming the first Tulu to be remade in other language. The film was released on 20 November 2014.

== Cast ==
- Likith Shetty
- Ramya Barna
- Umesh Mijar
- Navya
- Usha Bhandary
- Bhojaraj Vamanjoor
- Jayarama Acharya
- Santosh Shetty
- Chetan Rai Mani
- Raghavendra Rai
- Sandeep Shetty Maibettu
- Prasanna Bailoor
- Sunil Nelligudde
- Manju Rai Muloor
- Rohini Jagaram
- Ramesh Kalladka
- Dayanand Kulal Urwa
- Arun Shetty Mangaladevi
- Yadav Mannagudde
- Vinod Yekkur
- Mangesh Bhat Vittal
- Harish Moodbidri
