= Umesh Mijar =

Indian film actor

Umesh Mijar (also known as Chote Mijar) is an Indian film actor known for his work in the Tulu film industry. He has worked in more than 22 films mostly as a comedian. He made his lead debut with Umil (2018).

== Filmography ==
As actor

- Ekka Saka (2015)
- Dhand (2015)
- Daniklena Joklu (2015)
- Pavithra – Beedida Ponnu (2016)
- Ashem Zalem Kashem (2017; Konkani)
- Appe Teacher (2018)
- Umil (2018)
- Girgit (2019)
- Gamjaal (2021)
- Hareesha Vayassu 36 (2022; Kannada)
- Gauji Gammath (2023)
- Gosmari Family (2023)
- Circus (2023)
- Gant Kalver (2025)

As playback singer

- Pepperere Pererere (2021)

=== Television ===
- Bale Telipaale
- Jeevana Sanjeevana
