= RED FM Tulu Film Awards =

- Country: India
- Presented by: Red FM 93.5
- First award: 2014

The Red FM Tulu Film Awards is an award ceremony for Tulu films presented by Red FM 93.5 radio station. The awards have been instituted to honour both artistic and technical excellence in Tulu Cinema.

== Awards List ==
- Lifetime Achievement Award - K.N.Taylor
- Best Film - Oriyardori Asal
- Best Actor (Male) - Arjun Kapikad for Telikeda Bolli
- Best Actor (Female) - Pakhi Hegde for Bangarda Kural
- Best Director - H S Rajshekar for Oriyardori Asal
- Best Actor in a Comic Role - Navin D Padil for Oriyardori Asal
- Best Male Playback Singer - Udit Narayan for Oriyardori Asal
- Best Female Playback Singer - Sangeeta Balachandra for Kadala Mage
- Best Music Director - A K Vijay for Oriyardori Asal
- Best Choreography - Madan Harini for Telikeda Bolli
- Best Actor in a Negative Role - Gopinath Bhat for Telikeda Bolli
- Best Supporting Actor - B S Boloor for Telikeda Bolli
- Best Supporting Actress - Shakuntala Shetty for Kanchilda Bale
- Best Child Artist Award - Baby Chitra for Kanchilda Bale
- Best Lyricist - V.Manohar for Barke
- Best Editor - Srinivas Babu for Oriyardori Asal
- Best Cinema Developer Award - P L Ravi for Kanchilda Bale
- Best Background Score - Sathish Babu for Oriyardori Asal
- Best Art Direction - Tamma Lakshman for Kadala Mage
- Best Action - Harish Shetty for Bangarda Kural
- Best Dialogue - Devadas Kapikad for Telikeda Bolli
- Best Screenplay - Ram Shetty for Bangarda Kural
- Best Story - Sudhakar Bannanje for Dever

== Special awards ==
- 'Gaggara'
- Sadashiva Shetty
- Bangar Patler
- Nirel
- Sarojini Shetty
- Seetharam Kulal
- Pradeep

== See also ==
- List of Tulu films of 2015
- List of Tulu films of 2014
- List of Released Tulu films
- Tulu Cinemotsava 2015
