= Arjun Kapikad =

Indian actor

- Occupation: Actor
- Years active: 2012–present

Arjun Kapikad AKA Arjun Dev is an Indian actor and singer, who appears in Tulu films and Kannada film industries.He is a son of legendary Tulu Cinema & Drama artist Dr. Devadas Kapikad. He made his acting debut with the 2012 movie, Telikeda Bolli. He is a frequent collaborater with his father Devadas Kapikad.

== Filmography ==
Year	Film	Role	Language	Notes	Ref.
2012	Telikeda Bolli		Tulu		
2014	Rang		Tulu		
2014	Chaali Polilu		Tulu	Cameo appearance	
2015	Oriyan Thoonda Oriyagapuji		Tulu		
2015	Dhand	Arjun	Tulu		
2015	Chandi Kori		Tulu	Also playback singer	
2016	Madhura Swapna		Kannada	Also playback singer	
2016	Barsa	Prithvi	Tulu	Also playback singer	
2017	Mugulu Nage		Kannada	Cameo appearance	
2017	Are Marler	Shekara	Tulu		
2018	Karne	Sakshath	Tulu		
2018	Yera Ullerge	Jeetu	Tulu		
2019	Jabardasth Shankara	Shankara	Tulu	Also lyricist and playback singer	
2020	Malgudi Days	Vijay	Kannada		
2022	Abatara		Tulu	Directorial Debut	
2026	Operation London Cafe		Marathi; Kannada	Bilingual film	
2026	Toss (2026 film)		Tulu; Kannada	Bilingual film	

=== As dubbing artist ===
- Kantara (2022) for Rishab Shetty (Tulu dubbed version)

As playback singer

- Umil (2018)

== Awards ==
- Red FM Tulu Film Award 2014 - Best Actor for Telikeda Bolli
- Tulu Cinemotsava Awards 2015 -Best Actor(public choice) for Rang
- Tulu Cinemotsava Awards 2015 -Best Emerging Actor

== List of Tulu Movies Links ==
- Karnataka State Film Award for Best Regional film
- RED FM Tulu Film Awards
- Tulu Cinemotsava 2015
