= Roopesh Shetty =

Indian actor (born 1990)

- Born: Uppala, Kasargod, India
- Occupations: Actor, singer, model, songwriter and RJ in Mangalore

Roopesh Shetty is an Indian actor and director, who predominantly works in Tulu and Kannada films. He is also a radio jockey in Mangaluru and a model. He emerged as the Winner (Top Performer) of the Season 1 of Bigg Boss Kannada OTT. He also won Bigg Boss Kannada (season 9).

== Early life ==
Roopesh Shetty was born in a Tulu-speaking Bunt familyin Kasaragod, Kerala, India

== Career ==
Roopesh Shetty started his career as a YouTuber where he started uploading Tulu comedy album songs. He then worked as an RJ and VJ in Mangaluru. He made his film debut in a supporting role in a Tulu movie titled Dibbana. In 2015, he appeared as the main lead in Ice Cream Tulu movie. However, the movie did not do well at the box-office. He then made his Kannada debut with Danger Zone. This film also failed to reach maximum audiences. After appearing in several Kannada and Tulu films, his luck changed after the release of Girgit Tulu movie. In September 2022 he emerged as the winner of the Season 1 of Bigg Boss Kannada OTT. He also won Bigg Boss Kannada (season 9) in December 2022.

== Filmography ==
=== As an actor ===
	Film		Language	Notes
2011	Dibbana		Tulu	Supporting role
2015	Ice Cream		Tulu	
2016	Danger Zone		Kannada	
2017	Ashem Zalem Kashem		Konkani	
2017	Smile Please	Roopesh	Kannada	Cameo appearance
2017	Nishabda 2		Kannada	
	Porlu (Telefilm)		Tulu	Also director, writer, playback singer, and lyricist
2018	Ammer Polisa		Tulu	
2019	Anushka		Kannada	
2019	Girgit		Tulu	Also director and writer
2021	Gamjaal		Tulu	
2021	Govinda Govinda	Srinivas	Kannada	
2022	VIP's Last Bench		Tulu	
2023	Manku Bhai Foxy Rani		Kannada	
2023	Circus		Tulu	Also director and writer
2025	Adhipatra	Athreya	Kannada	
2025	Jai	Satya	Tulu; Kannada	Also director and writer
2026	Sannidhanam P.O		Tamil	
Upcoming	BRO		Tulu	Also director

=== Television ===
	Reality Show	Role	Language	Notes
2022	Bigg Boss OTT(Season 1)	Himself	Kannada	Winner
2022	Bigg Boss(Season 9)	Himself	Kannada	Winner
2022	Ayyane Mane(Season 2)	TBA	Kannada	

=== As a singer ===
- E Sala Cup Namde – Original, Sung in support of IPL team Royal Challengers Bangalore.
