= Devadas Kapikad =

Indian actor

- Born: Mangalore, Karnataka, India
- Other name: Telikeda Bolli
- Occupations: Actor; director; writer; singer; lyricist
- Spouse: Sharmila
- Children: Arjun Kapikad
- Honours: Honorary Doctorate by the University of Mangalore (2022)

Dr.Devadas Kapikad is a Tulu film and theatre actor, director, writer, producer, lyricist and singer. He has also acted in some Kannada films. He owns a drama troupe called Cha-parka.

== Filmography ==
- All films are in Tulu, unless otherwise noted.

| Year | Title | Role | Notes |
|---|---|---|---|
| 2009 | Venkata in Sankata | Rajaram Laddoo | Kannada films |
| 2012 | Toofan | | Kannada films |
| 2012 | Telikeda Bolli | Kariye | Also writer |
| 2014 | Rang | Principal | |
| 2014 | Chaali Polilu | | |
| 2015 | Soombe | | |
| 2015 | Chandi Kori | Devdas | Also director, composer, lyricist, and singer |
| 2016 | Barsa | | Also, director, composer, lyricist and singer |
| 2016 | Dabak Daba Aisa | Devu | |
| 2017 | Are Marler | | Also director and composer |
| 2018 | Appe Teacher | | |
| 2018 | Yera Ullerge | | Also director |
| 2019 | Jabardasth Shankara | | Also director |
| 2020 | Navelru…Half Boiled | | Kannada film |
| 2021 | Soda Sarbath | | |
| 2022 | Magane Mahisha | | |
| 2022 | Abatara | | |
| 2024 | Purushothamana Prasanga | | Kannada film; also director |
| 2025 | Jai | | Kannada-Tulu bilingual |
| 2026 | Picture | | |
| 2026 | Toss | | |

=== As dubbing artist ===
- Kantara (2022) for Achyuth Kumar (Tulu dubbed version)

== Awards ==
- RED FM Tulu Film Awards- Best Dialogue for Telikeda Bolli
- Tulu Cinemotsava 2015 award- Best actor in a supporting role for Telikeda Bolli
- Tulu Cinemotsava 2015 award- Best Dialogue for Telikeda Bolli
- Honorary Doctorate from Mangalore University - 2022

== List of Tulu Movies Links ==
- List of tulu films of 2015
- List of Tulu films of 2014
- List of Released Tulu films
- Tulu cinema
- Tulu Movie Actors
- Tulu Movie Actresses
- Karnataka State Film Award for Best Regional film
- RED FM Tulu Film Awards
- Tulu Cinemotsava 2015
