= Tulu cinema =

- No. of screens: 50 Single-screens in Karnataka

Produced feature films (2022)
- Total: 11

Tulu cinema, also known as Coastalwood, is a part of Indian cinema. The Tulu film industry produces five to seven films annually. The first Tulu film was Enna Thangadi released in 1971. Earlier, these films were released in theatres across the Tulu Nadu region. Tulu film industry has grown to such an extent that films are being released simultaneously in Mangaluru, Udupi, Mumbai, Bengaluru and Middle East. The critically acclaimed Tulu film Suddha won the award for the best Indian Film at the Osian's Cinefan Festival of Asian and Arab Cinema held in New Delhi in 2006. In 2011, the Tulu film Industry got a second lease of life with the release of the film Oriyardori Asal. The film turned out to be the biggest hit in Tulu film history to date. Chaali Polilu is the longest running film in Tulu film industry. This movie is the highest-grossing film in the Tulu film industry. It has successfully completed 470 days at PVR Cinemas in Mangalore.

On 27 February 2016, Times of India carried a special report regarding the Tulu cinema industry where it was observed that in its 45-year history, of the Tulu industry, only 45 movies were released for the first 40 years from 1971 to 2011, whereas in the five years since then, 21 films have been made. It also identified Oriyardori Asal (with 1,000-plus houseful shows and a 175-day run in the Tulu-dominated regions of south Karnataka) as the turning point of the industry. It also reported that eight films were made in 2014 and eleven films were made in 2015 and identified Kudla Cafe as the 66th film from the Tulu film industry. It also reported that another movie that broke records was Chaali Polilu, a 2014 social comedy film by Virendra Shetty Kavoor, which had a run of 470 shows at a popular multiplex in Mangalore, playing to full houses on the weekends and 50% occupancy on weekdays. It also reported that with a modest budget of Rs 40 lakhs (4,000,000) to Rs 60 lakhs (6,000,000), Tulu films stood out with their touch of reality.

For a language native to about two million people, the main audience for Tulu films is limited to two districts – Dakshina Kannada and Udupi - and Kasaragod taluk. They also see a limited release in Mumbai, Bengaluru, and Dubai.

The 2014 movie Madime was reported to be remade in Marathi, thereby becoming the first Tulu movie to be remade in another language. Shutterdulai is the first remake in Tulu cinema. Eregla Panodchi is the second remake in Tulu cinemas. A suit for damages of Rs. 25 lakhs (2,500,000) was filed against the makers of the Telugu film Brahmotsavam for copying the first 36 seconds of the song A...lele...yereg madme by Dr. Vamana Nandaavara found on the Deepanalike CD composed for the Siri channel. The song was used in the movie in a sequence involving the lead actor who, while accompanying his family on a tour, dances to the tune of the hit Tulu song. Prajavani reported that with its dubbing rights sold to Hindi for 21 lakhs (2,100,000), the 2018 movie Umil became the first Tulu movie to achieve the feat.

Ashwini Kotiyan (Chaya Harsha) became the first female director in the Tulu industry after directing and releasing her first movie Namma Kudla. Brahmashree Narayana Guruswamy released on 2 May 2014 was the 50th Tulu film. Panoda Bodcha marked the 75th release anniversary of a Tulu film. The 100th Tulu movie Karne was released on 16 November 2018.

== Major achievements ==
| Year | Title | Producer | Director | Notes |
|---|---|---|---|---|
| 1971 | Enna Thangadi | | | First Tulu film |
| 1971 | Dareda Budedi | K. N.Tailor | | Second Tulu film |
| 1972 | Bisatti Babu | | | First film to receive the state government award as the best Tulu film |
| 1973 | Koti Chennaya | | Vishu Kumar | First history-based Tulu film |
| 1978 | Kariyani Kattandi Kandani | Aroor Bhimarao | | First Tulu colour film |
| 1993 | Bangar Patler | | Richard Castelino | Received the highest national and international awards in Tulu Cinema |
| 1994 | September 8 | | Richard Castelino | Shot in 24 hours entirely in Mangalore, a record in world cinema |
| 2005 | Sudda | Ramchandra P. N | Ramchandra P. N | Won the award for best Indian film at the eighth Asian Film Festival "Ocean - Cinefan" |
| 2014 | Nirel | Shodhan Prasad San Poojary | Ranjith Bajpe | First Tulu film shot entirely overseas (Dubai) |
| 2014 | Chaali Polilu | Prakash Pandeshwar | Virendra Shetty Kavoor | Highest-grossing film in the Tulu film industry. It has successfully completed 511 days at PVR Cinemas in Mangalore. First Tulu film released in Israel. |
| 2014 | Madime | | Vijaykumar Kodialbail | Reported to be remade in Marathi, thereby becoming the first Tulu film to be remade in another language |
| 2015 | Dhand | Shodhan Prasad | Ranjith Bajpe | First Tulu movie to be released in Australia, and United Kingdom |
| 2015 | Chandi Kori | Sharmila Kapikad and Sachin Sunder | Devadas Kapikad | Successfully completed 100 days in Mangalore and Udupi. |
| 2019 | Belchappa | Jayadurga Production | Rajanish Devadiga | Completed shooting in a record 14-day schedule |
| 2019 | Girgit | Shoolin Films & Manjunath Attavar | Roopesh Shetty | Highest-grossing Tulu film till date |
| 2019 | Pingara | Avinash Shetty and Manjunath Reddy | Preetham Shetty | Won the National award for the Best Tulu film |
| 2021 | Gamjaal | Shoolin Films & Mugrody Productions | Naveen Shetty and Suman Suvarna | First Tulu film to recover budget within three days |
| 2021 | Soda Sarbath | Lancy D’Souza, Diany D’Souza, Paul D’Souza and Prashanth Ferao | Pradeep Barboza Paladka | First Tulu film released in Qatar. |
| 2022 | Raj Sounds and Lights | Anand N Kumpala | Rahul Amin | First Tulu movie to be premiered in 6 Indian cities and 11 countries. |
| 2022 | Jeetige | Arun Rai Thodar | Santhosh Mada | Won the national award for the Best Tulu film |

== List of highest grossing Tulu films ==
| Rank | Title | Worldwide gross | Year | Ref. |
|---|---|---|---|---|
| 1 | Girgit | Unknown | 2019 | |
| 2 | Pilibail Yamunakka | ₹2.5 crore | 2016 | |
| 3 | Chaali Polilu | ₹2 crore | 2014 | |
| 4 | Chandi Kori | ₹1.68 crore | 2015 | |
| 5 | Oriyardori Asal | ₹1.5 crore | 2011 | |

== List of Tulu films ==
- List of Tulu films of 2025
- List of Tulu films of 2024
- List of Tulu films of 2023
- List of Tulu films of 2022
- List of Tulu films of 2021
- List of Tulu films of 2020
- List of Tulu films of 2019
- List of Tulu films of 2018
- List of Tulu films of 2017
- List of Tulu films of 2016
- List of Tulu films of 2015
- List of Tulu films of 2014
- List of Tulu-language films

== See also ==
- Tulu language
- Tulu Nadu
