= Bhojaraj Vamanjoor =

Tulu Actor

- Born: Bhojaraj Vamanjoor; Vamanjoor, Mangalore
- Occupations: Actor, Singer
- Known for: Tulu Play, Tulu Movies

Bhojaraj Vamanjoor is an Indian actor, who predominantly works in Tulu theatre and Tulu film industry. Vamanjoor is also a Yakshagana Artist. He is one of the active members of the Tulu drama troupe "Cha Parka Kalavidher Kudla" along with Devadas Kapikad, Naveen D. Padil and Aravind Bolar. He can be seen in most Tulu plays directed by Devadas Kapikad.

He has been honoured with "Dakshina Kannada Jilla Rajyotsava Prashasti" on the occasion of Karnataka Rajyotsava 2014 in Mangalore for his achievement in theatre. Gamjaal is one of his recent movies.

== Filmography ==
Year	Film	Role	Notes
2006	Kadala Mage		
2011	Oriyardori Asal		
2012	Sompa		
2012	Bangarda Kural		
2012	Amait Asal Ehff seenmait Kusal		
2013	Telikeda Bolli		
2013	Chella Pilli		Kannada film
2014	Rang		
2014	Madime		
2014	Chaali Polilu		
2015	Soombe		
2015	Ekka Saka		
2015	Oriyan Thoonda Oriyagapuji		
2015	Jokulatike		
2015	Chandi Kori		
2015	Super Marmaye		
2015	Eregla Panodchi		
2017	Ambar Caterers		
2019	Golmaal		
2019	Pencil Box		
2019	Odeya		Kannada film
2022	Bojaraj MBBS		
2022	Magane Mahisha		
2023	Yaan Superstar		
