= Naveen D. Padil =

Indian theatre and film actor (born 1969)

- Born: 11 November 1969 (age 56); Padil, Mangalore, Karnataka, India
- Occupation: Actor
- Years active: 1994; 2008–present

Naveen D. Padil (born 11 November 1969) is an Indian theatre and film actor who has performed in over a thousand plays mostly in Tulu language. Known widely in the circles of Tulu theatre from his acting performances as a "Master of Comedy and Tragedy", he is called "Kusalda Arase" (transl. The King of Comedy). He is known mainly for his portrayal of comical characters. Padil along with Devadas Kapikad and Aravind Bolar formed a famous trio that appeared in Tulu comedy plays during the 1990s and early 2000s.

== Career ==
Padil made his debut in films with the 1994 Malayalam film Vidheyan directed by the Adoor Gopalakrishnan. In the late 2000s, alongside his theatre career, Padil's got his break in films as he began appearing in Tulu films primarily. Popular films include Oriyardori Asal (2011), Telikeda Bolli (2012) and Chaali Polilu (2014). He also appeared in a supporting role in the 2011 Kannada film Jarasandha. In 2014, in recognition of his contribution to theatre, he was awarded at the 24th Sandesha Awards in the Arts segment. His performance in the 2016 Tulu film Kudla Cafe won him the Karnataka State Film Award for Best Supporting Actor.

== Filmography ==
=== Tulu films ===
Year	Title	Role(s)	Notes
2008	Gaggara		
2008	Birse		
2011	Oriyardori Asal		
2012	Aamait Asal Eemait Kusal		
2012	Telikeda Bolli		
2013	Rikshaw Driver		
2014	Kanchilda Baale		
2014	Jokulatike		
2014	Rang		
2014	Chaali Polilu	Damu	
2015	Soombe		
2015	Ekka Saka	Gopal	
2015	Super Marmaye	Hari	
2015	Chandi Kori		
2016	Kudla Cafe	Bhaskar	Karnataka State Film Award for Best Supporting Actor
2016	Yesa		
2017	Arjun Weds Amrutha		
2017	Pilibail Yamunakka		
2017	Ambar Caterers		
2018	Appe Teacher		
2018	Umil		
2019	Girgit		
2020	2 Ekre		
2021	Gamjaal		
2022	Abatara		
2022	Magane Mahisha		
2023	Pili		
2023	Goujii Gammath		
2023	Gosmari Family		
2023	Circus		
2023	Yaan Superstar	Kiran	
2025	Middle Class Family		
2025	Gant Kalver		
2025	Jai		Kannada - Tulu bilingual
2026	Imbu	Balanna	
2026	Gajanana Cricketers Janthottu Since 1983		

=== Kannada films ===
Year	Title	Role(s)	Notes
2011	Achchu Mechchu		
2011	Jarasandha		
2013	Chella Pilli		
2017	Happy Journey		
2018	MLA		
2018	Ananthu vs Nusrath	Aithal	
2021	Roberrt	Vishwanath Bhat's brother-in-law	
2022	Kantara	Lawyer	
2023	Server	Bartender Giraki	
2024	Pepe	Rayappa	
2025	Kantara: Chapter 1	Booba	
2025	Jai		

=== Malayalam films ===
Year	Title	Role(s)	Notes
1994	Vidheyan		

== Television ==
Year	Title	Role	Language	Channel
2015 - 2017	Majaa Talkies	Kotiyappa / Gundu Mava	Kannada	Colors Kannada

== Awards ==
Karnataka State Film Awards

- Best Supporting Actor: Kudla Cafe

RED FM Tulu Film Awards

- 2014: Best Actor in a Comic Role: Oriyardori Asal

Tulu Cinemotsava 2015

- 2015: Best Actor in a Comic Role: Telikeda Bolli
- 2015: Best Actor (Public Voting): Chaali Polilu

== See also ==
- Tulu cinema
- Karnataka State Film Award for Best Regional film
