= Karnataka State Film Award for Best Regional Film =

State film award of Karnataka, India

- State award for contributions to Kannada cinema
- Awarded for: Best Film in Regional Languages of Karnataka
- Sponsored by: Government of Karnataka
- Rewards: Silver Medal; ₹ 50,000
- First award: 1996-97
- Final award: 2021
- Most recent winner: Nada Peda Asha

Highlights
- Total awarded: 20
- First winner: Bogsane

Karnataka State Film Award for Best Regional Film is a film award of the Indian state of Karnataka given during the annual Karnataka State Film Awards. The award honors the sub-sect of Kannada films.

== Award winners ==
The following is a complete list of award winners and the films for which they won.

Year	Film	Language	Producer	Director	Reference(s)
2021	Nada Peda Asha	Kodava	Harini Vijay Uttaiah; Yashoda Kariappa	Prakash Kariappa	
2020	Jeetige	Tulu	Arun Rai Thodar	Santhosh Mada	
2019	Triple Talaq	Beary	Gulvady Talkies	Yakub Khader Gulvady	
2018	Deyi Baidethi	Tulu	Sankri Motion Pictures	Sooryodaya	
2017	Sophiya	Konkani	Janet Noronha	Harry Fernandes	
2016	Madipu	Tulu	Hemanth Suvarna	Chethan Mundadi	
2015	Thalang Neer	Kodava			
2014	Vishada Male	Tulu			
2013	Rickshaw Driver	Tulu	Sri Mutthu Films	Ha. Su. Rajashekar	
2012	Konchavaram	Banjari			
2011	Ujwadu	Konkani	• K. J. Dhananjay • Anuradha	Kasaragod Chinna	
2010–11	Naa Puttna Mann	Kodava	C. Suresh Nanjappa	Shivadhwaj	
2009–10	Kazaar	Konkani	Frank Fernandes	Richard Castelino	
2008–09	Ponnra Manass	Kodava			
2008–09	Sona	Lambani			
2007–08	Birse	Tulu	M. V. Lokesh	Srinivas Kowshik	
2006–07	Badi	Tulu	Richard Castelino	Richard Castelino	
2005–06	Kadala Mage	Tulu	Sadhana N. Shetty	Praveen Jain	
2004–05	No Award				
2003–04	No Award				
2002–03	No Award				
2001–02	No Award				
2000–01	Thudar	Tulu		Kodlu Ramakrishna	
1999–2000	No Award				
1998–99	Onthe Yedjust Mallpy	Tulu		Prajwal Shetty	
1997–98	Bal Polandath	Kodava	S.M.Poovaiah	Addanda C. Cariappa	
1996–97	Bogsane	Konkani	Richard Castelino	Richard Castelino	

== See also ==
- Cinema of Karnataka
- List of Kannada-language films
- Tulu cinema
