= Aravind Bolar =

Indian film actor

- Born: 4 January 1966 (age 60); Mangalore, India
- Occupation: Actor
- Known for: Tulu Drama, Yakshagana and Films
- Style: Comedy
- Title: Tulunada Manikya
- Spouse: Savitri
- Awards: Bharath Social Welfare Trust (BSWT) 'Person of the Year’ award
- Honours: Kannada Rajyotsava; Sadhane Sharadar; Tuluva Manikya

Aravind Bolar (born 1966) is an Indian actor who primarily works in Tulu and Kannada-language films. Bolar began his career in Yakshagana, and he has acted in more than 100 plays and 50 plus films.

== Personal life ==
Aravind Bolar was born to Kirshnaapa Belchad and Sundari in Bolar in Mangalore district, Karnataka, India. Bolar married Savitri and they have two daughters, Kumari Supreetha Bolar and Kumari Akshitha Bolar.

== Filmography ==
=== Tulu films ===
Year	Title	Role	Notes	Ref.
2011	Oriyardori Asal	Corporator Sesappa		
2012	Telikeda Bolli	Tailor Bhoja		
2012	Sompa			
2013	Rickshaw Driver			
2013	Pakkilu Mooji			
2014	Chaali Polilu	Wizard Babanna		
2015	Ekka Saka	Gunanath from Dubai		
2015	Oriyan Thoonda Oriyagapuji	Kerala's Cook		
2015	Super Marmaye	Keshava		
2015	Chandi Kori	Rocky		
2015	Yeregla Panodchi	Lender		
2016	Pavitra - Beedida Ponnu	Cable Repairer		
2016	Dabak Daba Aisa			
2016	Dombarata	Vishwanatha		
2016	Barsa	Market's President		
2016	Pilibail Yamunakka	Mahabale		
2017	Chapter			
2017	Yesa	Jaggu		
2017	Ambar Caterers			
2017	Arjun Weds Amrutha			
2018	Appe Teacher			
2018	Tottil	Mechanic Ramesh		
2018	Ammer Polisa			
2018	Dagal Bajilu			
2018	Pattis Gang			
2018	Umil	Jarappa		
2018	Pammanne - The Great‌	Pammanne		
2018	My Name Is Annappa	Krishnanand Sundar Karunaanand Sagar		
2018	Kori Rotti			
2019	Kambalabettu Bhatrena Magal‌			
2019	Katapadi Kattappa			
2019	Golmaal			‌
2019	Aye Yer			‌
2019	Belchappe			
2019	Girgit	Lawyer Kodanda		
2019	Aatidonji Dina	Don‌		
2020	2 Ekre	Sanjeeva (Vicky's Dad)		
2020	Kudkana Madme			
2020	Gulab Jamun		Released on Talkies App	
2021	Gamjaal			
2021	Gad Bad		Released on Talkies App	
2021	English			
2021	Yeregavuye Kirikiri			
2021	Soda Sharbath			
2022	Bojaraj MBBS			
2022	Magane Mahisha			
2022	Raj Sounds and Lights			
2022	Love Cocktail			
2022	VIP’s Last Bench			
2022	Abatara Maternala			
2023	Shakalaka Boom Boom			
2023	Goujii Gammath			
2023	Gosmari Family			
2023	Pirkilu			
2023	Circus			
2023	Raapata			
2024	One and Only Gabbar Singh			
2024	Balipe			
2024	Thudarr			
2025	Middle Class Family			
2025	Gant Kalver			
2025	Jai			
2026	Picture			

=== Kannada films ===
Year	Title	Role	Reference
2013	Chella Pilli		
2013	Rangolu		
2019	Badri v/s Madhumathi		
2019	Pencil Box‌		
2022	Buddies		
2022	Chase		
2022	Triple Riding	Priest	
2023	Spooky College		
2023	Nimmellara Aashirvada		
2024	For Regn		
2024	Purushothamana Prasanga		

=== Konkani films ===
Year	Title	Role	Reference
2017	Ashem Zalem Kashem	Ricchi	

=== Television ===
Year	Title	Television	Language	Episodes	Role	Notes	Reference
2014	Kapikad’s Comedy World	Daijiworld247	Tulu	6	Various Roles		
2014	Babanna-Boobanna	Daijiworld247	Tulu	20	Babanna		
	Kan Kat	Daijiworld247	Tulu	8			
2020	Bolar the Anchor	Daijiworld247	Tulu	3	Bolar	Following the success of the show it was ended on 24 May 2020 and re-launched as Private Challenge	
2020	Private Challenge S1	Daijiworld247	Tulu	60	Various Roles	The Season ended on 11 July 2021	
2021	Kapikadrena Comedy Bittil	Nammakudla247	Tulu	couple of episodes	Various Roles		
2021	Dhon Gadi Kushen Kaadi	Daijiworld247	Konkani	2	Stand-Up Comedian	Appeared in Episode 06 and 17 as a Stand-up comedian	
2021-2022	Private Challenge S2	Daijiworld247	Tulu	60	Various Roles	The Season ended on Nov 20, 2022	
2023-2024	Private Challenge S3	Daijiworld247	Tulu	40	Various Roles	Premiered on 11 June 2023 - Mar 10, 2024 (Last Episode)	

== See also ==
- Tulu cinema
