= Pruthvi Ambaar =

Indian actor

- Born: 17 August 1988 (age 38); Udupi, Karnataka, India
- Other name: Nagaraj Ambaar
- Education: St. Aloysius College, Mangaluru, India
- Occupations: Radio jockey, Actor
- Spouse: Parul Shukla (m. 2019)

Pruthvi Ambaar (born 17 August 1988) is an Indian actor who works predominantly in Kannada and Tulu cinema, with notable appearances in Hindi, Marathi, and Tamil films. He began his career as a radio jockey in Mangaluru under the name RJ Nagaraj, before transitioning to acting through short films and television serials.

Ambaar made his film debut in the Tulu film Barke (2014) and gained early recognition with Pilibail Yamunakka (2016), directed by K Sooraj Shetty, which became a hit in the Tulu film industry. His breakthrough came with the Kannada romantic drama Dia (2020), directed by K S Ashoka, where his portrayal of Adi earned widespread critical acclaim. The film’s success established him as one of the most promising actors in South Indian cinema. For Dia, Ambaar won the SIIMA Award for Best Male Debut – Kannada and the Santhosham Film Award for Best Actor in a Leading Role, along with nominations from critics’ associations.

Over the years, Ambaar has starred in films such as Sugarless (2022), Dooradarshana (2023), and Kothalavadi (2025).

== Early life and education ==
Pruthvi Ambaar was born on 17 August 1988 in Udupi, Karnataka, India, into a Tulu-speaking family. He completed his schooling in Udupi and pursued higher education in Mangaluru, where he developed an interest in performing arts.

Before entering films, Ambaar worked as a radio jockey and appeared in short films and television serials, which helped him gain visibility and refine his acting skills. His early exposure to media and stage performances laid the foundation for his film career.

== Career ==
=== 2014-2020: Early Work and Tulu cinema ===
Ambaar made his acting debut in the Tulu film Barke (2014). Though the film had a modest release, it marked his entry into cinema after working as a radio jockey and appearing in short films. He rose to prominence with Pilibail Yamunakka, directed by K Sooraj Shetty, co-starring Sonal Monteiro. The film was a major hit in the Tulu belt, earning him the Red FM Tulu Film Award for Best Actor. He continued to appear in regional hits like Appe Teacher and Rambarooti, earning praise for his comic timing and relatable performances.

=== 2020-Present: Breakthrough in Kannada cinema and career expansion ===
He made his Kannada film debut with Rajaru (2017), followed by DK Bose (2019), directed by Anil Kumar.

Ambaar’s career-defining moment came with Dia (2020), directed by K S Ashoka, opposite Kushee Ravi and Dheekshith Shetty. He portrayed Adi, a selfless lover. The film became a hit and earned Ambaar the SIIMA Award for Best Male Debut – Kannada. Ambaar reprised his role in the Hindi remake Dear Dia (2022), marking his Bollywood debut and its Marathi adaptation Sari (2023).

He also appeared in Kannada films like Sugarless (2022), directed by Shashidhar KM, opposite Priyanka Thimmesh. His other noteworthy role came through Bairagee alongside Shivarajkumar. Ambaar starred in Dooradarshana (2023), directed by Arvind Kuplikar, opposite Meghana Gaonkar, a nostalgic comedy set in the 1980s. He also featured in the anthology Pentagon (segment Karma).

He appeared in Juni, directed by Vaibhav, playing Partha in a romantic drama, and in Matsyagandha. His Tamil debut came with Mazhai Pidikkatha Manithan. His film Happily Married had a direct OTT release.

In 2025, Ambaar continued his successful run with Kothalavadi, an action drama directed by Lohith, and Bhuvanam Gaganam. He also signed Dear Uma (Telugu) and Life Is Beautiful, expanding his multilingual footprint.

== Personal life ==
Pruthvi married Parul Shukla on 3 November 2019 in a traditional ceremony held in Uppala, Kasaragod district. The couple first met over a decade earlier on the set of the dance reality show Great Karnataka Dance League in Bengaluru, where they were contestants on different teams. The couple welcomed their first child, a daughter named Charvie, on 12 March 2022.

== Filmography ==
=== Films ===
Key
†	Denotes films that have not yet been released

Year	Title	Role	Language	Notes	Ref.
2014	Barke		Tulu	Debut film; credited as Nagaraj Ambar	
2014	The Flow		Kannada	Short films; Credited as Nagraj Ambaar	
2014	Yenchi Saav Maare		Kannada	Short films; Credited as Nagraj Ambaar	
2016	Pilibail Yamunakka	Gautham	Tulu		
2016	Karvva	Rahul	Kannada	Uncredited role	
2017	Rajaru		Kannada		
2018	Ammer Polisa	Himself	Tulu	Guest appearance	
2018	Pammanne The Great		Tulu		
2019	DK Bose	Bharath	Kannada		
2019	Golmaal		Tulu		
2019	Aati Donji Dina		Tulu		
2019	English		Tulu		
2020	Dia	Adi	Kannada		
2020	Kudkana Madme		Tulu		
2020	Enna		Tulu		
2020	2 Ekre		Tulu		
2022	Dear Dia	Adi	Hindi	Hindi film debut	
2022	Bairagee	Vaatapi	Kannada		
2022	Sugarless	Venkatesh	Kannada		
2022	VIP'S Last Bench		Tulu		
2023	Dooradarshana	Manu	Kannada		
2023	Pentagon		Kannada	Anthology film; segment Karma	
2023	Sari	Adi	Marathi		
2024	Juni	Partha	Kannada		
2024	For Regn	Akshay	Kannada		
2024	Matsyagandha	Param	Kannada		
2024	Mazhai Pidikkatha Manithan	Burma	Tamil		
2025	Bhuvanam Gaganam	Ram	Kannada		
2025	Dear Uma	Dev	Telugu		
2025	Kothalavadi	Mohana	Kannada		
2026	Chowkidar	Siddharth	Kannada		
2026	America America 2	Neel	Kannada		
2026	Life Is Beautiful †	TBA	Kannada	Post-production	

=== Television ===
Year	Name	Role	Network	Notes
2008	Radha Kalyana	Sheelam	Zee Kannada	
2014	Sagara Sangama	Sanju	Zee Kannada	
2015	Love Lavike	Manu	Zee Kannada	
2020	Jothe Jotheyali	Neel	Zee Kannada	Special appearance
2023	Farzi	Sunny	Amazon Prime Video	Dubbed for Kannada version; webseries

== Awards and nominations ==
Film	Award	Category	Result	Ref.
Pilibail Yamunakka	RED FM Tulu Film Awards	Best Actor	Won	
Dia	Chandanavana Film Critics Academy	Best Actor in a Leading Role-Male	Nominated	
Dia	South Indian International Movie Awards	Best Male Debut – Kannada	Won	
Dia	Santosham Film Awards	Best Actor in a Leading Role	Won	
