= Bairagee =

2022 Indian Kannada film

- Theatrical release poster
- Directed by: Vijay Milton
- Written by: Vijay Milton
- Based on: Kadugu (Tamil) by Vijay Milton
- Produced by: Krishna Sarthak
- Starring: Shiva Rajkumar; Dhananjay; Anjali; Pruthvi Ambaar; Yasha Shivakumar
- Cinematography: Vijay Milton
- Edited by: Deepu S. Kumar
- Music by: Anoop Seelin
- Production company: Krishna Creations
- Distributed by: Jagadeesh Films; Jayanna Films
- Release date: 1 July 2022
- Running time: 135 minutes
- Country: India
- Language: Kannada

Bairagee is a 2022 Indian Kannada-language action drama film directed by Vijay Milton. A remake of Milton's own Tamil film Kadugu, the film stars Shiva Rajkumar and Dhananjay in the lead roles, while Anjali, Pruthvi Ambaar, Sharath Lohithaswa, Shashi Kumar and Vinod Kumar Alva are in key supporting roles. The music was composed by Anoop Seelin, while the cinematography and editing were handled by Deepu S. Kumar and Vijay Milton.

Bairagee was released on 1 July 2022 to mixed-to-positive reviews from critics, but the film bombed at the box office.

== Plot ==
"Huli" Shivappa and his uncle are Hulivesha artists performing at a function, before Shivappa gets involved in a fight due to someone injuring his uncle. While serving jail time, Shivappa's uncle dies, and Inspector Prakash Sarang teaches him to control his anger and employs him after Shivappa is released. Shivappa also befriends Vaataapi and former boxer and leader of the village, Karna. One day, Vaataapi places a lock on a local music teacher's motorcycle instead of the motorcycle of his love interest Shobina. The teacher notices Shivappa's hesitant help to pay her fine.

On Facebook, Shivappa befriends someone by the name "Deepika Padukone", who is actually the teacher. The two talk, and Shivappa suggests they meet in person. They meet on a train but don't see each other, instead talking by phone. The teacher explains that she had a troubled upbringing but eventually finished a teacher's training course at age 14 thanks to local politicians, but the local newspaper branded her as a prostitute upon her success. To avoid bringing shame to her family and sister's wedding, she moved to a different city where no one knew her. When Karna invites an MLA for an inauguration, the MLA tries to molest a child named Keerti. Karna attempts to intervene, but realises that his political career could be in jeopardy, so he keeps quiet about the issue.

The teacher intervenes later, saving Keerthi while being injured in the process. Keerthi is traumatised and withdraws from school. Shivappa learns about the issue and turns on Karna, who is constantly conflicted about his decision. Due to Karna's current standing and lack of proof and complaint, the police doesn't take any action. During a temple worship, Keerthi commits suicide by drowning. The teacher realizes that she has to file a police complaint, which confuses Shivappa and Vaataapi since Keerthi had already died. The teacher goes to the police station to file the complaint, but is taken by the MLA's PA to Karna's celebration venue where Shivappa also arrives. It is revealed through the complaint that after the teacher saved Keerthi from the MLA, the MLA assaulted the teacher.

Karna and Shivappa fight, but Shivappa bests him and reminds him that it is their duty to protect women. When Shivappa, Vaataapi, and the teacher go to file a police complaint, Inspector Sarang shows them that it is not necessary as Karna is now in prison. Karna explains that while the complaint would have put the MLA behind bars, the teacher's reputation would have been tarnished. Instead, Karna went to the MLA's residence and killed him, thus taking the blame and exacting vengeance for Keerthi's death.

== Cast ==
- Shiva Rajkumar as "Huli" Shivappa
- Anjali as the music teacher
- Dhananjay as Karna Vijayagatti
- Pruthvi Ambaar as Vaataapi
- Yasha Shivkumar as Shobina
- Shashi Kumar as Inspector Prakash Sarang
- Sharath Lohithaswa as Minister
- Vinod Kumar Alva as Inspector
- Baby Saptha Poorvi as Keerthi
- Yamuna Srinidhi as Keerthi's mother
- Kalpana Naganath as Karna's mother

=== Cameo appearance ===
- Anu Prabhakar as Rukmini
- Chikkanna in the song "Rhythm of Shivappa"

== Soundtrack ==
J. Anoop Seelin composed the soundtrack.

No.	Title	Lyrics	Singer(s)	Length
1.	"Grahana"	Pramod Maravante	Vyasaraj Sosale, Vasishta N. Simha, Ananya Bhat	3:01
2.	"Rhythm Of Shivappa"	Pramod Maravante	Sharan, Shiva Rajkumar, Saanvi Shetty	3:55
3.	"Nakaranakha"	V. Nagendra Prasad	Anthony Daasan	3:45
4.	"Prisoner 123 Theme"	—	—	0:51
Total length:				11:32

== Release ==
The film was theatrically released on 1 July 2022.

=== Home media ===
The satellite and digital rights were sold to Colors Kannada and Voot.

== Reception ==
=== Critical response ===
Sunayana Suresh of The Times of India gave 3.5/5 stars and wrote "The film does give enough whistle-worthy moments, but also gives enough scope for emotions and relationships to play out at their own pace." Swaroop Kodur of OTTplay gave 3/5 stars and wrote "Bairagee is pure, good-old masala fun that also strives sincerely to be engaging and worthwhile."

A. Sharadhaa of The New Indian Express wrote "Bairagee is a film that will appeal to the masses and the family audience." Muralidhara Khajane of The Hindu wrote "Offering a complete package with all the ingredients, especially action and emotion, this Vijay Milton-directorial will not disappoint the audience."
