= Mugguru Monagallu =

Mugguru Monagallu may refer to these Indian films:

- Mugguru Monagallu (1994 film), a 1994 Telugu-language film
- Mugguru Monagallu (2021 film), a 2021 Telugu-language film

== See also ==
- Monagallaku Monagadu, a 1966 Telugu-language film
- Mugguru, a 2011 Telugu-language film
- Mugguru Maratilu, a 1946 Telugu-language film
- Mugguru Kodukulu, a 1988 Telugu-language film
- Muggur, an Icelandic painter
