= Kotee =

Drama thriller film

- Theatrical release poster
- Directed by: Parameshwar Gundkal
- Written by: Parameshwar Gundkal
- Produced by: Jyoti Deshpande
- Starring: Dhananjaya; Moksha Kushal; Ramesh Indira; Tara; Rangayana Raghu
- Cinematography: Arun Bhrama
- Edited by: Pratheek Shetty
- Music by: Songs: Vasuki Vaibhav; Background Score: Nobin Paul
- Production companies: Jio Studios; Vaishno Studios
- Distributed by: KRG Studios
- Release date: 14 June 2024
- Running time: 170 Minutes
- Language: Kannada

Kotee (transl. Crore) is a 2024 Indian Kannada-language drama thriller film directed by debutant Parameshwar Gundkal and produced by Jyoti Deshpande under Jio Studios. The film stars Dhananjaya, alongside Moksha Kushal, Ramesh Indira, Rangayana Raghu and Tara. It marks the debut of Jio Studios in Kannada cinema. The soundtrack and score were composed by Vasuki Vaibhav and Nobin Paul, while cinematography and editing were handled by Arun Bhrama and Pratheek Shetty.

Kotee was released on 14 June 2024 to mixed-to-positive reviews from critics.

== Plot ==
The story follows Kotee (Dhananjaya), a lower-middle-class man who runs a small packers-and-movers business and doubles as a cab driver to support his family. His household includes his mother (Tara), his sister Mahathi (Thanuja Venkatesh), and his younger brother Nachchi (Pruthvi Shamanur). Despite financial struggles, Kotee is principled and avoids taking loans.

However, unforeseen circumstances—some deliberately engineered by Dinoo Saavkaar (Ramesh Indira), a ruthless local gangster—force Kotee to borrow money. What begins as a small loan spirals into a crushing debt of ₹31 lakh, trapping him in Saavkaar's web. Saavkaar soon discovers Kotee's hidden talent: exceptional shooting skills. Exploiting this, he offers Kotee a way out—commit a murder in exchange for clearing his debt. This proposition shakes Kotee's moral foundation. Torn between his principles and the survival of his family, Kotee faces an impossible choice: kill or be killed.

As the tension escalates, Kotee navigates the dark underworld of Janatha City, encountering betrayal, violence, and emotional turmoil. His relationship with Navami (Moksha Kushal) adds a layer of vulnerability, contrasting the grim reality of his predicament. The narrative also highlights his mother's silent suffering and resilience, adding emotional depth to the story.

== Cast ==
- Dhananjaya as Kotee
- Moksha Kushal as Navami
- Ramesh Indira as Dinoo Saavkaar
- Tara as Sujatha (Kotee's mother)
- Rangayana Raghu as Ramanna
- Pruthvi Shananur as Nachchi (Kotee's brother)
- Thanuja Venkatesh as Mahathi (Kotee's sister)
- Sardar Satya as Prabhakar
- Abhishek Shrikanth as Shiva
- Priya Shatasharman as Pavani (Dinoo Saavkaar's wife)
- Duniya Vijay as Kotee's father (cameo appearance)

== Production ==
In April 2023, it was reported that Parameshwar Gundkal, renowned for his path breaking work in Kannada television as the business head for Viacom18 Kannada, was set to make his directorial debut in Kannada cinema. Parameshwar Gundkal joined hands with Jio Studios and Dhananjaya was chosen to headline the project. Though the title was initially kept under wraps, Dhananjaya accidentally revealed the title in one of his interviews. Debutant Moksha Kushal was selected as the female lead and Ramesh Indira, who impressed the audience in Sapta Sagaradaache Ello, was cast as the antagonist in the film.

The film was shot in Bangalore and Mysore.

== Soundtrack ==
Kotee

Soundtrack album by Vasuki Vaibhav
- Released: 30 May 2024
- Recorded: 2024
- Genre: Soundtrack
- Length: 18:00
- Label: Saregama
- Producer: Vasuki Vaibhav

Vasuki Vaibhav chronology
Tagaru Palya (2023)	Kotee (2024)
External audio
- Official Audio Jukebox on YouTube

The songs of the film are composed by Vasuki Vaibhav while the background score is by Nobin Paul. The music rights of the film were acquired by Saregama.

Track list
No.	Title	Lyrics	Singer(s)	Length
1.	"Maathu Sothu"	Yogaraj Bhat	Armaan Malik	03:23
2.	"Janatha City"	Vasuki Vaibhav	Sanjith Hegde	03:23
3.	"Sobaane"	Yogaraj Bhat	Vasuki Vaibhav, Madhuri Seshadri	03:52
4.	"Mana Mana"	Yogaraj Bhat	Ananya Bhat, Siddarth Belmannu	03:25
5.	"Madhava Mamava"	Narayana Theertha	Madhuri Seshadri	03:57
Total length:				18:00

== Release ==
=== Theatrical ===
The film was theatrically released on 14 June 2024 across Karnataka and few select cities outside Karnataka.

== Reception ==
The film generally opened to positive reviews from critics and audience, however the pace and the length of the film was criticized along with few routine sequences in the film.

Sridevi S of The Times of India rated the movie 3.5/5 stars and wrote "At almost three hours, the run time is a bit excessive but the tug-of-war between Dhananjaya and Ramesh Indira makes this slow-burner a perfect family entertainer". Shashiprasad of Times Now in his review wrote "Despite a few minor hiccups, Param’s writing along with Daali Dhananjaya’s brilliant performance help Kotee hit the bull’s eye". Sunayana Suresh of The South First rated the movie 3.5 out of 5 stars and described the movie as "A Kannada film for Kannadigas amidst the Pan Indian movies". Reviewing for The News Minute, Subha J Rao wrote "Dhananjaya shines in an earnest, well-rounded film about money". A Sharadhaa of The New Indian Express rated the movie 3/5 and wrote "Like its protagonist, the film strives for greatness, albeit not always achieving it, yet its sincerity resonates, making the journey worthwhile".

On the Contrary Prathiba Joy of OTTplay rated the movie 3/5 and in her review wrote "Dhananjaya, Ramesh Indira in fine form, but Param’s debut directorial has massive soap opera hangover". Latha Srinivasan of the Hindustan Times in her review wrote "Those who love soap operas where the common man is the victor will definitely enjoy Kotee and root for him. Param's film could've been pacy". Vivek MV of The Hindu wrote "Playing a hard-working honest man, Dhananjaya excels in the titular character to become the saving grace in an otherwise bland film from Parameshwar Gundkal". Pranathi A S of the Deccan Herald rated the movie 2 out of 5 and described the movie as "Dhananjaya charms despite soap opera-paced storytelling".
