= 6-5=2 (2014 film) =

2014 Indian Hindi-language horror film by Bharat Jain

- Movie Poster
- Directed by: Bharat Jain
- Story by: K S Ashoka
- Produced by: Bharat Jain
- Starring: Niharica Raizada; Prashantt Guptha; Ashrut Jain; Gaurav Paswalla; Gaurav Kothari; Disha Kapoor
- Cinematography: Satya Hegde
- Distributed by: Swarnalatha Production
- Release date: 14 November 2014
- Running time: 103 minutes
- Country: India
- Language: Hindi

6-5=2 is a 2014 Indian Hindi-language found footage horror film and a remake of the 2013 Kannada-language film of the same name which itself was inspired by the 1999 American film The Blair Witch Project. Produced and directed by Bharat Jain, the film stars Niharica Raizada, Prashantt Guptha, Ashrut Jain, Gaurav Paswalla, Gaurav Kothari and Disha Kapoor in lead roles. The cinematography was conducted by Sathya Hegde, a prominent cinematographer in the Kannada film industry. The film tells the story of a group of youngsters whose mountain trek goes awfully wrong. This is one of the first Hindi horror films in the found footage genre.

== Plot ==
The film tells the story of six friends whose mountain trek goes awfully wrong as they trespass into a forbidden region. They encounter bizarre incidents during their mountain trek. These incidents are recorded on a video recorder. The story is presented as they discover video recordings left behind by characters who have died or gone missing.

== Cast ==
- Niharica Raizada as Priya
- Prashantt Guptha as Sidharth
- Ashrut Jain as Bhanu
- Gaurav Paswalla as Raja
- Gaurav Kothari as Harsh
- Disha Kapoor as Suhana

== Production ==
The film is produced by Bharat Jain. The Hindi film is a big-budget version which costs are as much as a normal Hindi film. It is presented by Mars Inc presentation.

== Reception ==
Official trailer of the film was released in the month of October and movie was released on 14 November 2014. The film managed to have good total box office collection on its first weekend.
