= Mihika Kushwaha =

Indian actress (born 1995)

- Born: 20 July 1995 (age 30); Agra, India
- Occupations: Actress; model
- Years active: 2021–present
- Notable work: Dear Dia

Mihika Kushwaha is an Indian model and actress, who made her Bollywood debut from movie Dear Dia, which was a remake of Kannada movie Dia.

== Life ==
Kushwaha is from Agra, Uttar Pradesh. She started modelling at a young age before moving into acting. In 2021 and 2022, she also featured in the music videos Idhar Dekho and Boond Boond, respectively. Kushwaha studied for a Master of Business Administration degree before joining the entertainment industry.

== Filmography ==
=== Film ===
Year	Title	Role	Notes
2022	Dear Dia	Dia	

=== Music videos ===
List of music videos done by Trisha Krishnan
Year	Title	Composer	Singer(s)	Lyricist	Performer	Label	Ref.
2021	Idhar Dekho	Sohail Sen	Amit Mishra, Altamash Faridi	Tanveer Ghazi	Sharad Malhotra, Isha Sharma	Matrix Music	
2022	Boond Boond	Rishabh Srivastava	Javed Ali, Prateeksha Shrivastava	Laado Suwalka	Paras Arora	Matrix Music	
