= Vasuki Vaibhav =

Indian composer

- Born: 7 December 1992 (age 33); Bengaluru, Karnataka, India
- Genres: Soundtrack
- Occupations: Singer; composer; lyricist; actor
- Years active: 2016–present
- Spouse: Brunda (2023)

Vasuki Vaibhav is an Indian composer and singer, music director, and actor known for his work in Kannada-language films. Vaibhav gained recognition after appearing in Rama Rama Re (2016). He was the second runner-up of Big Boss Kannada Season 7.

== Career ==
Vasuki started as a theatre artist and started to sing, compose, write lyrics, act and has even produced plays. His breakthrough in Kannada cinema was in the 2016 film Rama Rama Re. His work in Sarkari Hi. Pra. Shaale Kasaragodu Koduge: Ramanna Rai was praised by both audience and critics.

== Discography ==
=== As composer ===
Year	Album	Notes
2016	Rama Rama Re	Composed and Sang three songs
2018	Aatagadharaa Siva	Telugu remake of Rama Rama Re; Songs only
2018	Churikatte	
2018	Sarkari Hi. Pra. Shaale, Kasaragodu, Koduge: Ramanna Rai	
2018	Ondalla Eradalla	
2019	Bhinna	Title montage only
2019	Mundina Nildana	"Innunu Bekagide" song
2019	Katha Sangama	One of seven music directors
2020	Law	
2020	French Biriyani	Also lyricist
2021	Badava Rascal	
2022	Man on the Match	
2022	Harikathe Alla Girikathe	
2023	Dooradarshana	
2023	Tatsama Tadbhava	Also lyricist
2023	Tagaru Palya	Also Actor
2024	Kotee	Songs and Lyricist

== As actor ==
Year	Film	Role
2016	Urvi	
2017	Allama	
2017	Shuddhi	
2022	Man of the Match	Himself
2022	Vikrant Rona	Balakrishna
2023	Tagaru Palya	groom
2024	Mafia	Santhosh

=== Web series ===
Year	Title	Role
2022	Honeymoon	Wedding Photographer

=== Television ===
Year	Title	Notes	Ref.
2019	Bigg Boss Kannada 7	Second Runner Up	

== Awards ==
Movie	Award	Category	Result	Ref.
Sarkari Hi. Pra. Shaale, Kasaragodu, Koduge: Ramanna Rai	66th Filmfare Awards South	Best Music Director	Won	
Sarkari Hi. Pra. Shaale, Kasaragodu, Koduge: Ramanna Rai	8th SIIMA Awards	Best Music Director	Nominated	
French Biriyani	9th SIIMA Awards 2020	Best Music Director	Nominated	
Badava Rascal	67th Filmfare Awards South	Best Music Director	Won	
Badava Rascal	10th South Indian International Movie Awards	Best Music Director	Nominated	
Ninna Sanihake	10th South Indian International Movie Awards	Best Lyricist ("Ninna Sanihake")	Won	
