= Ondalla Eradalla =

- Theatrical Release Poster
- Directed by: D. Satya Prakash
- Written by: D. Satya Prakash; H. S. Nagendra; Dananjay Ranjan
- Produced by: Umapathy Films
- Starring: Rohith Pandavapura; Mata M. Koppala; Anand Tumkur; Sai Krishna Kudla; Ramzaan Saab Ullaagaddi
- Cinematography: Lavith
- Edited by: B S Kemparaju
- Music by: Vasuki Vaibhav; Nobin Paul
- Release date: 24 August 2018
- Running time: 130 minutes
- Country: India
- Language: Kannada

Ondalla Eradalla (transl. Not one, not two..) is a 2018 Indian comedy drama film written and directed by D. Satya Prakash who previously wrote and directed Rama Rama Re, and produced by Umapathy Srinivas who has also produced Hebbuli. Production of the film started in February, the lead actor Rohith Pandavpura a young boy from Pandavapura was selected out of the 1500 kids auditioned for the film.

== Plot ==
The story revolves around a seven-year-old boy named Sameera who loses his pet Banu. He goes alone in search of his pet cow to a town called 'Pete', along the way he meets many people from different sections of society. Innocence is the main theme of the movie, whether his innocence can reign over the selfishness of the people he meets on the way to recover his lost pet forms the main crux of the movie.

== Cast ==
- Rohith Pandavpura as Sameer
- Sai Krishna Kudla as Huli
- M. K. Mutt
- Anand Neenasam as Nandagopala, a financier
- Prabhudeva Hosadurga as Rajanna
- Nagabhushana as Suresha, an auto rickshaw driver
- Ramzaan Saab Ullaagaddi
- G. S. Ranganath
- U. V. Nanjappa Benaka
- Thimappa Kulal
- Sandhya Arakere
- Usha Ravishankar
- Triveni M. Vasishta

== Music ==
Music for the film was composed by Vasuki Vaibhav and Nobin Paul and was released on 25 July 2018 on YouTube. Lyrics for the tracks were written by D. Satya Prakash for the soundtrack.

No.	Title	Singer(s)	Length
1.	"Iceu Piceu Ree"	Vasuki Vaibhav	1:58
2.	"Nammoru Thammoru"	Vasuki Vaibhav	2:49
3.	"Yaaro Karedoru"	Vasuki Vaibhav	2:18
4.	"Haadalu"	Sunidhi, Adithi	1:55
Total length:			9:24

== Awards and nominations ==
Award	Category	Recipient	Result	Ref.
66th National Film Awards	Best Feature Film on National Integration	Umapathy Srinivas; D. Satya Prakash	Won	
66th National Film Awards	Best Child Artist	Rohith Pandavapura	Won	
2018 Karnataka State Film Awards	Third Best Film	Umapathy Srinivas D. Satya Prakash	Won	
