= Pentagon (film) =

2023 Indian film by Chandra Mohan

- Poster
- Directed by: Chandra Mohan; Akash Srivatsa; Raghu Shivamogga; Kiran Kumar; Guru Deshpande
- Written by: S Shyam Prasad; Abhishek A; Kyathe Gowda SM; Vamshi Krishna; Raghu Niduvalli; Sharanu Hullur; Raghu Shivamogga
- Produced by: Guru Deshpande
- Starring: Kishore; P. Ravi Shankar; Vijanath Biradar; Pramod Shetty; Prakash Belawadi; Pruthvi Ambaar
- Cinematography: Kiran Hampapur; Guruprasad MG; Abhilash Kalathi
- Edited by: Venkatesh UDV
- Music by: Manikanth Kadri
- Production company: G Cinemas
- Release date: 7 April 2023
- Country: India
- Language: Kannada

Pentagon is a 2023 Indian Kannada-language anthology drama film directed by Chandra Mohan, Akash Srivatsa, Raghu Shivamogga, Kiran Kumar and Guru Deshpande and starring Kishore, P. Ravi Shankar, Vijanath Biradar, Pramod Shetty, Prakash Belawadi and Pruthvi Ambaar. The film consists of five different stories with a common theme. This film is one of the few Kannada anthology films.

== Cast ==
Mr Goofy's Café by Chandra Mohan	Mysore Pak by Akash Srivatsa	Kamaturam Na Bhayam Na Lajja by Raghu Shivamogga	Doni Saagali Munde Hogali by Kiran Kumar	Karma by Guru Deshpande
Pramod Shetty	Vijanath Biradar as Ramakant	Sagar as Anil; Tanisha Kuppanda as Jessi; Prakash Belawadi as Rajesh Nayak	Prithika Deshpande as Low caste woman; P. Ravi Shankar as Kodagu landlord	Kishore as Kadamba Ramachandrappa; Pruthvi Ambaar

== Soundtrack ==
The music was composed by Manikanth Kadri and released on Jhankar Music.

Track listing
No.	Title	Lyrics	Singer(s)	Length
1.	"Kaamanabillu (features in Kamaturam Na Bhayam Na Lajja)"	Nagarjun Sharma	Santosh Venki, Inchara Rao	3:38
2.	"Theme (Soothakada Kaarmoda Kadugappu Kaageyadu)"	Raghu Shivamogga	Ananya Bhat	4:18
Total length:				7:56

== Reception ==
A critic from Bangalore Mirror wrote that "If you cannot resist the lure of tales, this movie is for you". A critic from The South First wrote that "Presented through the prisms of death (crow), Pentagon is worth watching for the underlying message about life and the decent entertainment it offers". A critic from The New Indian Express wrote that "There are a lot of stories, a lot of characters, and a lot of takeaways from Pentagon, which highlights the importance of life, and the consequences of death, and leaves the audience with the envious task of picking the best of the lot". A critic from The Times of India wrote that "Pentagon, which is an anthology film, is an [sic] unique attempt by the five directors based on concepts which are different from each other, and generates interest with simple narration and what stands out is each story has a message which is conveyed in an impactful manner without relying on one or two characters and it manages to leave a mark". A critic from OTTPlay wrote that "Pentagon works quite well with the help of a unifying theme and there's a lot to savour here. While the first two short films don't work as well, the remaining three salvage the film and keep us engaged till the last minute".
