= Dear Megha =

2021 film by A. Sushanth Reddy

- Theatrical release poster
- Directed by: Sushanth Reddy
- Screenplay by: Sushanth Reddy
- Story by: K. S. Ashoka
- Based on: Dia (2020) by K. S. Ashoka
- Produced by: Arjun Dasyan
- Starring: Megha Akash; Adith Arun; Arjun Somayajula
- Cinematography: I. Andrew
- Edited by: Prawin Pudi
- Music by: Gowra Hari
- Production company: Vedaansh Creative Works
- Release date: 3 September 2021
- Running time: 121 minutes
- Country: India
- Language: Telugu

Dear Megha is a 2021 Indian Telugu-language romantic drama film directed by Sushanth Reddy. Produced by Arjun Dasyan under Vedaansh Creative Works, the film stars Megha Akash, Adith Arun and Arjun Somayajula. A remake of 2020 Kannada film Dia, the plot follows the triangular love story. The film was released on 3 September 2021.

== Plot ==
Megha takes three years to confess her feelings to Arjun but he dies in a terrible accident. Later, when she begins a new life with Aadi, she finds out that Arjun is still alive.

== Cast ==
- Megha Akash as Megha Swaroop "Soup"
- Adith Arun as Aadi
- Arjun Somayajula as Arjun
- Pavitra Lokesh as Aadi's mother
- Ananda Chakrapani as Megha's father

== Production ==
The film was launched with a muhurat shot on 10 December 2020. The film was shot at various locations including Gateway of India in Mumbai, and Pernem railway station in Pernem (Goa). Filming was done for four days, at Pernem railway station. The entire filming was done in 28 days and was wrapped up in February 2021. Pavitra Lokesh reprised her role from the original version.

== Soundtrack ==
The first single "Aamani Unte" was released on 16 July 2021. Prakash Pecheti of Telangana Today wrote that "Sid Sriram’s voice and music director Gowra Hari’s rendition would probably be the best work that a film like ‘Dear Megha’ could get."

Dear Megha

Soundtrack album by Gowra Hari
- Released: August 26, 2021 (Jukebox)
- Genre: Feature film soundtrack
- Length: 18:00
- Language: Telugu
- Label: Silly Monks Music
- Producer: Gowra Hari

Gowra Hari chronology
Evadu Thakkuva Kadu (2019)	Dear Megha (2021)
External audio
- Audio Jukebox on YouTube

Singles from Dear Megha
- 1. "Aamani Unte" Released: 16 July 2021; 2. "Bagundhi Ee Kaalame" Released: 29 July 2021; 3. "Gundello Kanneeti Megham" Released: 7 August 2021

All lyrics are written by Krishna Kanth; all music is composed by Gowra Hari.

Track list
No.	Title	Singer(s)	Length
1.	"Aamani Unte"	Anurag Kulkarni	4:09
2.	"Bagundhi Ee Kaalame"	Sid Sriram	4:09
3.	"Chusa Ninu Chusa"	Sahithi	00:15
4.	"Gundello Kanneeti Megham"	Harini
5.	"Kashtam Vasthe Nake"	Gowra Hari

== Release ==
In August 2021, The Hans India reported that the film will be released directly on the over-the-top media service. Later, it was announced that the film would release in theatres on 3 September 2021.

== Reception ==
Thadhagath Pathi of The Times of India gave a rating of 3 out of 5 and felt that the film is a faithful remake of its original. He added "Dear Megha is a well-shot film that’ll leave you disturbed – just what the makers intended. But how fair is it really to not delve further into Megha's life is a question the audience can answer." In contrast, Murali Krishna CH felt that film is not so efficient remake of Dia. He praised Megha's acting performance and film score. The Hindu's Y Sunita Chowdhary commented that the film was neither great nor bad.
