= KTM (disambiguation) =

KTM is an Austrian motorcycle and bicycle manufacturer.

KTM may also refer to:

== Science and technology ==
- Kernel Transaction Manager, a kernel component in Microsoft's Windows Vista

== Places ==
- Kathmandu, Nepal
  - Tribhuvan International Airport, IATA code KTM

== Honours and awards ==
- Talent Medal of Korea is abbreviated to KTM as the post-nominal

== Companies and organisations ==
- Keretapi Tanah Melayu, the national railway company in Malaysia
- KTM AM, 780 kHz, Santa Monica, California (circa November 1928...May 6, 1935) see KABC_(AM)#Early_years

== Other uses ==
- KTM (film), an Indian Kannada-language romantic drama film
