= Juni (film) =

- Release poster
- Directed by: Vaibhav Mahadev
- Written by: Vaibhav Mahadev
- Produced by: Mohan Kumar S.
- Starring: Pruthvi Ambaar; Rishika Naik
- Cinematography: Jithin Das
- Edited by: Shashank Narayan
- Music by: Nakul Abhyankar
- Production company: Trishul Creations
- Release date: 9 February 2024
- Country: India
- Language: Kannada

Juni is a 2024 Indian Kannada-language romantic drama film directed by debutant Vaibhav Mahadev, starring Pruthvi Ambaar and Rishika Naik in the titular role. The film is produced by Mohan Kumar S under Trishul creations. The cinematography of the film is handled by Jithin Das and music was composed by Nakul Abhyankar.

The film was released on 9 February 2024 to positive to mixed reviews and underperformed at the box office.

== Plot ==
Based on Vaibhav Mahadev's friend in real life, Juni is about a girl with split personality. Partha is a young chef in Bangalore who falls for Juni, a regular customer at his café. His feelings seem to be reciprocated, until unexpected people come in between. Can Partha overcome them, and himself, in his quest for love?

== Cast ==
- Pruthvi Ambaar as Partha
- Rishika Naik as Juni/Mansi/Jacky
- Avinash as Partha's father
- Vinaya Prasad as Partha's mother
- Sudha Rani as Juni's mother

== Soundtrack ==
The soundtrack was composed by Nakul Abhyankar.

Track listing
No.	Title	Lyrics	Singer(s)	Length
1.	"Romanchana"	Pramod Marvante	Keerthan Holla, Ramya Bhat Abhyankar	3:23
2.	"Marulaade"	Pavan Bhat	Aishwarya Rangarajan, Nakul Abhyankar, Ramya Bhat Abhyankar, Lavita Lobo	3:37
Total length:				7:00

== Release and Reception ==
The film was theatrically released on 9 February 2024 while the film made its digital debut on 2 April 2024 on Amazon Prime Video. The film reportedly had over 1 crore of streaming minutes within 3 days of its digital release.

Vivek M.V. from The Hindu wrote that "Juni joins recent Kannada films such as Tatsama Tadbhava and Case of Kondana for not fully realising its potential. These films have great moments, but they struggle to come together as a whole". Harish Basavarajaiah from The Times of India rated the film 2 1/2 out of 5 stars and wrote that "Overall, Juni is a slow-burning love story enriched by strong performances and genuine moments of emotional resonance, inviting audiences to reflect on the enduring power of love in the face of adversity". Pranati A S of Deccan Herald rated the film 2 out of 5 stars and wrote that "Juni is a medically well researched film. However, while bringing in a narrative as sensitive as this, one needs to be aware of what the audience can draw from it" A Sharadhaa from Cinema Express rated the film three out of five stars and wrote that "Juni emerges as a decadent love story, blending moments of perfection and imperfection, ultimately serving as a poignant reminder of the enduring power of love amidst life’s challenges".
