= Aatagadharaa Siva =

2018 Indian Telugu-language film

- Poster
- Directed by: Chandra Siddhartha
- Based on: Rama Rama Re... by D Satya Prakash
- Produced by: Rockline Venkatesh
- Starring: Doddanna; Uday Shankar
- Cinematography: Lavith
- Edited by: Naveen Nooli
- Music by: Nobin Paul
- Production company: Rockline Entertainments
- Release date: 18 July 2018
- Country: India
- Language: Telugu

Aatagadharaa Siva is a 2018 Indian Telugu-language slice of life film directed by Chandra Siddhartha and starring Kannada actor Doddanna (in his only Telugu film to date) and Uday Shankar (in his lead debut). Dialogues written by K.A.Muni Suresh Pillai This film is a remake of the 2016 Kannada film Rama Rama Re....

== Plot ==
The escaped convict Babji (Uday Shankar) lands in a four-wheeler, being driven by Jangayya who has been called by the prison authorities to hang the former. Oblivious of each other's identities, the journey goes on while a series of characters bump into them.

== Cast ==
- Doddanna as Jangayya
- Uday Shankar as Babji
- Hyper Aadi as Aadhi
- Chammak Chandra
- Chalaki Chanti
- Rocket Raghava
- Jwala Koti

== Production ==
Kannada film producer Rockline Venkatesh agreed to produce the film under his banner Rockline Entertainments. Rao Ramesh was initially considered for the katikapari (transl. undertaker) role. The film's title is based on a lyric from song the "Aata Kada Jananalu" from Mithunam (2012).

== Release and reception ==
The film was scheduled to release on 20 July 2018 but the release date was advanced to 18 July 2018.

A critic from The Hindu wrote that "Screenplay is tight and holds the film together. The run time of the film is a huge advantage and if you are bored of formula stuff, go for this". A critic from The Hans India rated the film 3 1/2 out of 5 and wrote that this is one of the "few films touch your soul and make you reflect on the ideas put forth".

== Awards and nominations ==
Award	Category	Recipient(s) and nominee(s)	Result	Ref.
66th Filmfare Awards South	Best Supporting Actor - Telugu	Doddanna	Nominated	
66th Filmfare Awards South	Best Female Playback Singer - Telugu	Ananya Bhat for "Yettagayya Shiva Shiva"	Nominated	
