= Dia (film) =

Indian Kannada-language romantic film

- Directed by: K. S. Ashoka
- Written by: K. S. Ashoka
- Produced by: D Krishna Chaitanya
- Starring: Kushee Ravi; Pruthvi Ambaar; Dheekshith Shetty
- Cinematography: Vishal Vittal; Sourabh Waghmare
- Edited by: Naveen Raj
- Music by: B. Ajaneesh Loknath
- Production company: Sri Swarnalatha Productions
- Distributed by: KRG Studios
- Release date: 7 February 2020
- Running time: 136 minutes
- Country: India
- Language: Kannada

Dia is a 2020 Indian Kannada-language romantic drama film written and directed by K. S. Ashoka, and produced by D Krishna Chaitanya under Sri Swarnalatha Productions. It stars Kushee Ravi, Pruthvi Ambaar and Dheekshith Shetty, with a score by B. Ajaneesh Loknath. It was released on 7 February 2020 and was a box office success. It was re-released in 2021.

The plot follows the titular character who falls for her crush Rohit. When they get into an accident and Rohit dies, Dia tries to move on with another man named Adi only to find out that Rohit is still alive.

Dia was released on 7 February 2020 and was a success. The film was remade in Telugu as Dear Megha (2021), in Hindi as Dear Dia (2022) and in Marathi as Sari (2023).

== Plot ==
Dia Swaroop, an introverted biotechnology college student who lives in Bengaluru, has a crush on Rohit. She does not express her feelings for him before he moves out of the country. Three years later, Dia encounters Rohit in Mumbai, where she has moved and is now working. The two gradually begin to develop a bond, and Rohit proposes his love for her. One night, as they are returning home from a movie, they get into an accident after a car hits them. When Dia wakes up in the hospital and asks for Rohit, her father's friend tells her that Rohit has died. Unable to accept Rohit's death, Dia becomes severely depressed and leaves to Bengaluru, where she decides to kill herself at a railway crossing. Facing an oncoming train, she is interrupted by a phone call from Adi, who has retrieved Dia's bag from a thief. Annoyed, she tells him to keep it and not to call her again. Dia and Adi then run into one another several times, and Dia reveals her past to him. Adi charms Dia out of her depression; they become friends and eventually fall in love.

Dia returns to Mumbai, where she is shocked to find Rohit waiting for her. Rohit explains that he was declared brain dead, and that it was uncertain that he would regain consciousness, causing her father to tell his friend to lie to her with the hope that she would move on. Dia calls Adi and tells him that Rohit is alive. Adi, heartbroken, tells Dia that she should be happy with Rohit. Despite his mother forbidding him to see Dia, Adi goes to see her one last time. He finds Dia disheartened and Rohit happy, wishes them well and returns home. While away, Adi's mother has died from a heart attack, and he learns that she could have been saved had someone been there. Meanwhile, Dia confesses her college love, how she thought he died and how she met Adi to Rohit. A distressed Rohit tells her to return to Adi so that she will be happy. Elated, Dia goes to Adi's home and finds an auto driver who tells her that he is missing. She and the driver search for him until another auto driver reveals that Adi has gone to the railroad crossing where she attempted to kill herself. Adi has decided to kill himself at the railway crossing because he feels immense guilt over his mother's death and believes that he will be unable to live without his mother and Dia. He prays to God one last time for Dia's happiness and waits for the train. Dia reaches him and calls out; Adi turns to her, surprised, and is hit by a train as a startled Dia watches.

== Cast ==
- Kushee Ravi as Dia Swaroop
- Pruthvi Ambaar as Adi
- Dheekshith Shetty as Rohit
- Pavithra Lokesh as Dr. Lakshmi "Lucky", Adi's mother
- Arvind Rao as Dia's father
- Rajesh Rao as Dia's father's friend
- Jyothi Rai as Rohit's sister
- Chandan Ravandur N as a train passenger
- Gokul Chakravarthy as an auto driver
- Rakesh Srinivas as an auto driver
- Darshan Apoorva as Rohit's friend
- Rudwin as Rohit's friend

== Production ==
K. S. Ashoka initially worked on this film's script before making his directorial debut with the low budget horror film 6-5=2 (2013) but left the film due to budget constraints. Production for the film officially started in 2016. The film featured then newcomers Kushee Ravi, Pruthvi Ambaar, and Dheekshith Shetty, who went on to star in various other works prior to the film's release.

Ashoka broke up every dialogue of the film into svaras. The film was shot at various places in Karnataka including Bangalore, Karwar, Mangalore, and Udupi District (Kapu and Padukere Beach) apart from Hyderabad and Mumbai.

== Soundtrack ==
Dia

Soundtrack album by B. Ajaneesh Loknath
- Released: 2020
- Recorded: 2020
- Genre: Feature film soundtrack
- Length: 3:35

B. Ajaneesh Loknath chronology
Avane Srimannarayana (2019)	Dia (2020)	Gentlemen (2020)

B. Ajaneesh Loknath composed Dia's score. Ashoka decided to use an instrumental score with no songs, similar to European romance films. The film was promoted with a song, "Soul of Dia" due to the producer's demand although Ashoka was against using songs since he wanted to break the stereotype that every Indian romantic film has to have songs.

Track list
No.	Title	Lyrics	Singer(s)	Length
1.	"Soul of Dia"	Dhananjay Ranjan	Chinmayi, Sanjith Hegde	3:35

== Critical reception ==
Reviewing Dia for The Times of India, Sunayana Suresh gave the film four out of five stars, praising the realism of the story, the three main performances, the cinematography, and the score. Suresh noted that the story centers on the external and internal experiences and dialogues of the eponymous female protagonist. Suresh said that "the film is for those who want to experience cinema in a brave new style sans the commercial staples". In a review for The Hindu, S. Shiva Kumar praised the direction, acting, writing and score, but criticised the conclusion as abrupt. Kumar said: "The acting is first-rate particularly Kushee and Pruvthvi. Pavithra Lokesh is all grace and poise in a beautifully written role".

In the Deccan Herald, Vivek M V praised the direction, score, and Shetty and Ambar's acting, while criticising the plot as predictable, as well as Kushee's performance. Asianet News, on the other hand, praised Kushee, as well as the screenplay, but noted that the beginning was slow. For The New Indian Express, A. Sharadhaa rated the film four out of five stars, praising the screenplay, direction, performances, music and cinematography. Sharadhaa said: "With a skillfully told love story - one that is not generic - the director creates a unique kind of euphoria with heartbreaks". Manoj Kumar R., also writing for The New Indian Express, said that although the film's title is "dia" (transl. lamp), the film is "dark, gloomy and a tragedy of errors".

=== Box office ===
This film was one of the few commercially successful Kannada films in 2020 during the COVID-19 pandemic. Ashoka expressed joy of the film's reach across different audiences through OTT platforms.

== Accolades ==
Award (Note: Awards, festivals and organizations are in alphabetical order.)	Date of ceremony (Note: Date is linked to the article about the awards held that year, wherever possible.)	Category	Recipient(s)	Result	Ref.
Chandanavana Film Critics Academy Awards	21 February 2021	Best Film	D. Krishna Chaitanya	Won	
Chandanavana Film Critics Academy Awards	21 February 2021	Best Director	K. S. Ashoka	Nominated	
Chandanavana Film Critics Academy Awards	21 February 2021	Best Screenplay	K. S. Ashoka	Nominated	
Chandanavana Film Critics Academy Awards	21 February 2021	Best Dialogue	K. S. Ashoka	Won	
Chandanavana Film Critics Academy Awards	21 February 2021	Best Actor	Pruthvi Ambaar	Nominated	
Chandanavana Film Critics Academy Awards	21 February 2021	Best Actress	Kushee Ravi	Won	
Chandanavana Film Critics Academy Awards	21 February 2021	Best Supporting Actor	Dheekshith Shetty	Nominated	
Chandanavana Film Critics Academy Awards	21 February 2021	Best Supporting Actress	Pavithra Lokesh	Nominated	
Chandanavana Film Critics Academy Awards	21 February 2021	Best Music Director	B. Ajaneesh Loknath	Nominated	
Chandanavana Film Critics Academy Awards	21 February 2021	Best Background Music (Note: also for Gentleman.)	B. Ajaneesh Loknath	Won	
Chandanavana Film Critics Academy Awards	21 February 2021	Best Lyricists	Dhananjay Ranjan – (for "Soul of Dia")	Nominated	
Chandanavana Film Critics Academy Awards	21 February 2021	Best Female Singer	Chinmayi – (for "Soul of Dia")	Won	
Chandanavana Film Critics Academy Awards	21 February 2021	Best VFX		Nominated	
Chandanavana Film Critics Academy Awards	21 February 2021	Best Editing	Naveen Raj	Nominated	
South Indian International Movie Awards	19 September 2021	Best Film – Kannada	Sri Swarnalatha Productions	Nominated	
South Indian International Movie Awards	19 September 2021	Best Director – Kannada	K. S. Ashoka	Nominated	
South Indian International Movie Awards	19 September 2021	Best Actress – Kannada	Kushee Ravi	Nominated	
South Indian International Movie Awards	19 September 2021	Best Supporting Actor – Kannada	Dheekshith Shetty	Nominated	
South Indian International Movie Awards	19 September 2021	Best Male Debut – Kannada	Pruthvi Ambaar	Won	
South Indian International Movie Awards	19 September 2021	Best Music Director – Kannada	B. Ajaneesh Loknath	Won	
South Indian International Movie Awards	19 September 2021	Best Lyricist – Kannada	Dhananjay Ranjan – (for "Soul of Dia")	Won	
South Indian International Movie Awards	19 September 2021	Best Female Playback Singer – Kannada	Chinmayi – (for "Soul of Dia")	Nominated	
South Indian International Movie Awards	19 September 2021	Best Cinematographer – Kannada	Vishal Vittal, Sourabh Waghmare	Won	
South Indian International Movie Awards	19 September 2021	Best Actress in a Leading Role (Critics Choice) – Kannada	Kushee Ravi	Won	
Filmfare Awards South	9 October 2022	Best Film	D Krishna Chaitanya	Nominated	
Filmfare Awards South	9 October 2022	Best Actress	Kushee Ravi	Nominated	
Filmfare Awards South	9 October 2022	Best Female Playback Singer	Chinmayi Sripaada for "Soul of Dia"	Nominated	

== Rerelease and remakes ==
After Dia's success, it was re-released on 14 February 2021. It was initially supposed to re-release on 23 October 2020 with the new version reported to include the song "Soul of Dia" and have a different climax. It was also released on Amazon Prime. It was remade in Telugu as Dear Megha (2021), in Hindi as Dear Dia (2022) and in Marathi as Sari (2023). Both the Hindi and Marathi remakes were directed by Ashoka and featured Ambaar reprising his role of Adi.
