= Dear Uma =

2025 Indian Telugu-language film by Sai Rajesh Mahadev

- Theatrical release poster
- Directed by: Sai Rajesh Mahadev
- Screenplay by: Sai Rajesh Mahadev
- Story by: Sumaya Reddy
- Produced by: Sumaya Reddy
- Starring: Pruthvi Ambaar; Sumaya Reddy
- Cinematography: Raj Thota
- Edited by: Satya Giduturi
- Music by: Radhan
- Production company: Suma Chitra Arts
- Release date: 18 April 2025
- Running time: 154 minutes
- Country: India
- Language: Telugu

Dear Uma is a 2025 Indian Telugu-language medical drama film co-written and directed by Sai Rajesh Mahadev. The film features Pruthvi Ambaar (in his Telugu debut) and Sumaya Reddy in lead roles.

The film was released on 18 April 2025.

== Cast ==
- Pruthvi Ambaar as Dev
- Sumaya Reddy as Uma
- Kamal Kamaraju as Surya, Dev's brother
- Saptagiri
- Ajay Ghosh as Hospital Chairman
- Rajeev Kanakala as Uma's father
- Prudhvi Raj as Doctor
- Kedar Shankar as Dev's father
- Pramodini Pammi as Dev's mother
- Meena Vasu as Uma's mother
- Aamani
- Rupa Lakshmi

== Soundtrack ==
All music is composed by Radhan.

No.	Title	Lyrics	Singer(s)	Length
1.	"Nivevaro"	Ramajogayya Sastry	Ram Miriyala, Sarath Santosh	4:42
2.	"Nee Guruthulo"	Krishna Kanth	Sarath Santosh	4:11
3.	"Yevaipuko"	Purnachary	Karthik, Harini Ivaturi	5:22
4.	"Navvuthuntane"	Bhaskarabhatla	Anthony Daasan	3:17

== Release and reception ==
Dear Uma was released on 18 April 2025.

Suhas Sistu of The Hans India rated the film 3 out of 5. Giving the same rating, OTTPlay stated that, "Dear Uma is a social drama based on the medical mafia. The conflict point is interesting and is presented well".
