= Dr. 56 =

- Release poster
- Directed by: Rajesh Anandleela
- Story by: Praveen Reddy
- Produced by: Praveen Reddy
- Starring: Priyamani; Praveen Reddy; Raj Deepak Shetty; Ramesh Bhat
- Cinematography: Rakesh C. Thilak
- Edited by: Vishwa N. M.
- Music by: Nobin Paul
- Production companies: Hari Hara Pictures; Sri Lakshmi Jyothi Creations
- Release date: 9 December 2022
- Country: India
- Languages: Kannada; Tamil

Dr. 56 is an Indian thriller film directed by Rajesh Anandleela. Shot in Kannada and Tamil, the film was produced by the studios, Hari Hara Pictures and Sri Lakshmi Jyothi Creations. The film stars Priyamani, Praveen Reddy, Raj Deepak Shetty and Ramesh Bhat in leading roles. The film was released in theatres on 9 December 2022. It also marks Priyamani's return to Tamil cinema after 11 years since Chaarulatha (2012).

== Cast ==
- Priyamani as Priya Krishna IPS/Priya Krishnan IPS
- Praveen Reddy T. as Arjun
- Raj Deepak Shetty as Aswath
- Veena Ponnappa as Nandhini
- Manjunath Hegde
- Yathiraj as Rajeev

== Production ==
Priyamani signed on to work on the project during June 2019, and the shoot was largely completed by August 2019. The film was simultaneously shot in Kannada and Tamil, with the actress revealing that she would portray a CBI officer. The film marked Priyamani's return to Tamil cinema after 10 years. Singer Chethan Naik rendering two songs for the Tamil version, which marked his Tamil debut.

== Release and reception ==
The film had a theatrical release on 9 December 2022. A reviewer from The New Indian Express noted "excluding the inclusion of certain commercial elements, DR 56 is quite an enjoyable murder mystery that will find welcome among the faithful of that genre". A critic from Bangalore Mirror noted "catch this film if you crave for an action thriller".
