= 2018 Karnataka State Film Awards =

Annual Indian film awards ceremony

53rd Karnataka State Film Awards
- Awarded for: Best of Kannada Cinema in 2018
- Presented by: B. S. Yediyurappa (Chief Minister of Karnataka)
- Announced on: 10 January 2020
- Site: Bengaluru, Karnataka, India

Highlights
- Best Picture: Aa Karaala Ratri
- Best Direction: Dayal Padmanabhan; Aa Karaala Ratri
- Best Actor: Raghavendra Rajkumar; Ammana Mane
- Best Actress: Meghana Raj; Iruvudellava Bittu
- Most awards: Aa Karaala Ratri (3)

The 2018 Karnataka State Film Awards, presented by Government of Karnataka, felicitated the best of Karnataka cinema released in the year 2018. The Awards are given away on 24 April every year which is the birthday of Dr. Rajkumar. But due to the Lok Sabha and Assembly elections in the last two years, the awards were not given on this day. The list of winners was announced on 10 January 2020.

== Lifetime achievement award ==
| Name of Award | Awardee(s) | Awarded As | Awards |
|---|---|---|---|
| Dr. Rajkumar Award | Srinivasa Murthy | Actor | ₹2,00,000 and a gold medal with a certificate |
| Puttanna Kanagal Award | P. Sheshadri | Director | ₹2,00,000 and a gold medal with a certificate |
| Dr. Vishnuvardhan Award | B. S. Basavaraju | Cinematographer | ₹2,00,000 and a gold medal with a certificate |

== Film awards ==
| Name of Award | Film | Producer | Director |
|---|---|---|---|
| First Best Film | Aa Karaala Ratri | Dayal Padmanabhan | Dayal Padmanabhan |
| Second Best Film | Ramana Savari | • Stroiney Pais • Swapna | K Shivarudraiah |
| Third Best Film | Ondalla Eradalla | Umapathy Srinivas | D Satya Prakash |
| Best Film of Social Concern | Santakavi Kanakadasara Ramadhanya | Sreelakshmi Narasimha Movies | T.N. Nagesh |
| Best Children Film | Hoovu-Balli | Chandrika Films | B. Manjunath |
| Best Regional Film | Deyi Baidethi (Tulu language) | Sankri Motion Pictures | Sooryodaya |
| Best Entertaining Film | Sa.Hi.Pra.Shaale, Kasaragodu, Koduge: Ramanna Rai | Rishab Shetty | Rishab Shetty |
| Best Debut Film of Newcomer Director | Belakina Kannadi | Raju Hammini | Basavaraj V Hammini |

== Other awards ==
| Name of Award | Film | Awardee | Cash prize |
|---|---|---|---|
| Best Director | Aa Karaala Ratri | Dayal Padmanabhan | ₹ 1,00,000 |
| Best Actor | Ammana Mane | Raghavendra Rajkumar | ₹ 20,000 |
| Best Actress | Iruvudellava Bittu | Meghana Raj | ₹ 20,000 |
| Best Supporting Actor | Churikatte | Balaji Manohar | ₹ 20,000 |
| Best Supporting Actress | Aa Karaala Ratri | Veena Sundar | ₹ 20,000 |
| Best Child Actor | Ramana Savari | Master Aaron | ₹ 20,000 |
| Best Child Actress | Andavada | Baby Sinchana | ₹ 20,000 |
| Best Music Direction | K.G.F: Chapter 1 | Ravi Basrur | ₹ 20,000 |
| Best Male Playback Singer | Santakavi Kanakadasara Ramadhanya ("Irulu Chandirana") | Siddhartha Belmannu | ₹ 20,000 |
| Best Female Playback Singer | Deyi Baidethi ("Gejje Giri Nandana") | Kalavati Dayanand | ₹ 20,000 |
| Best Cinematography | Ammachi Yemba Kanasu | Naveen Kumar I | ₹ 20,000 |
| Best Editing | Trataka | Suresh Arumugam | ₹ 20,000 |
| Best Lyrics | Bayalatada Bheemanna | Baraguru Ramachandrappa ("Saave.. Saave..") | ₹ 20,000 |
| Best Art Direction | K.G.F: Chapter 1 | Shiva Kumar J | ₹ 20,000 |
| Best Story Writer | Nayigere | Harish S | ₹ 20,000 |
| Best Screenplay | Mookajjiya Kanasugalu | P. Sheshadri | ₹ 20,000 |
| Best Dialogue Writer | Savitribai Phule | Shirish Joshi | ₹ 20,000 |
| Jury's Special Award | Samanatheya Kadege | H. Anantharayappa (For Film) | ₹ 20,000 each |
| Jury's Special Award | Abbetumakura Siddhipurusha Vishwaradhyaru | V. Thomas (For Production Managing) | ₹ 20,000 each |
| Best Book on Kannada Cinema | Chitrakathe Hagendarenu ? | N. S. Shankar | ₹ 20,000 each |
| Best Book on Kannada Cinema | Ambarish-Vyakti-Vyaktitva-Varnaranjita Baduku | Sharanu Hullur | ₹ 20,000 each |
| Best Short Film | Paduvarahalli | V. Manoj Kumar | ₹ 20,000 |
