= Karnataka State Film Award for Director's First Time Best Film =

Indian film award

- State award for contributions to Kannada cinema
- Awarded for: Best First Film of New Director
- Sponsored by: Government of Karnataka
- Rewards: Silver Medal; ₹50,000
- First award: 2011
- Final award: 2021
- Most recent winner: Badava Rascal

Highlights
- Total awarded: 11
- First winner: Sidlingu

The Karnataka State Film Award for Director's First Time Best Film is a film award of the Indian state of Karnataka given during the annual Karnataka State Film Awards. The award honors debutant directors.

== Winners ==
Year	Film	Producer	Director	Refs.
2011	Sidlingu	T. P. Siddaraju	Vijaya Prasad	
2012	Alemaari	B. K. Srinivas	Hari Santhosh	
2013	Agasi Parlour		Mahanthesh Ramadurga	
2014	Ulidavaru Kandanthe	• Abhi • Simple Suni	Rakshit Shetty	
2015	RangiTaranga	H.K. Prakash	Anup Bhandari	
2016	Rama Rama Re...	Kolour Cinemas	D Satya Prakash	
2017	Ayana	Dees Films	Gangadhar Salimath	
2018	Belakina Kannadi	Raju Hammini	Basavaraj V Hammini	
2019	Gopala Gandhi	Sri Revanna Siddeshwara Movies	Nagesh N	
2020	Neeli Hakki	Ganesh Hegde, Suman Shetty, Vinay Shetty	Ganesh Hegde	
2021	Badava Rascal	Dhananjay, Rizwan	Shankar Guru	
