= D. Satya Prakash =

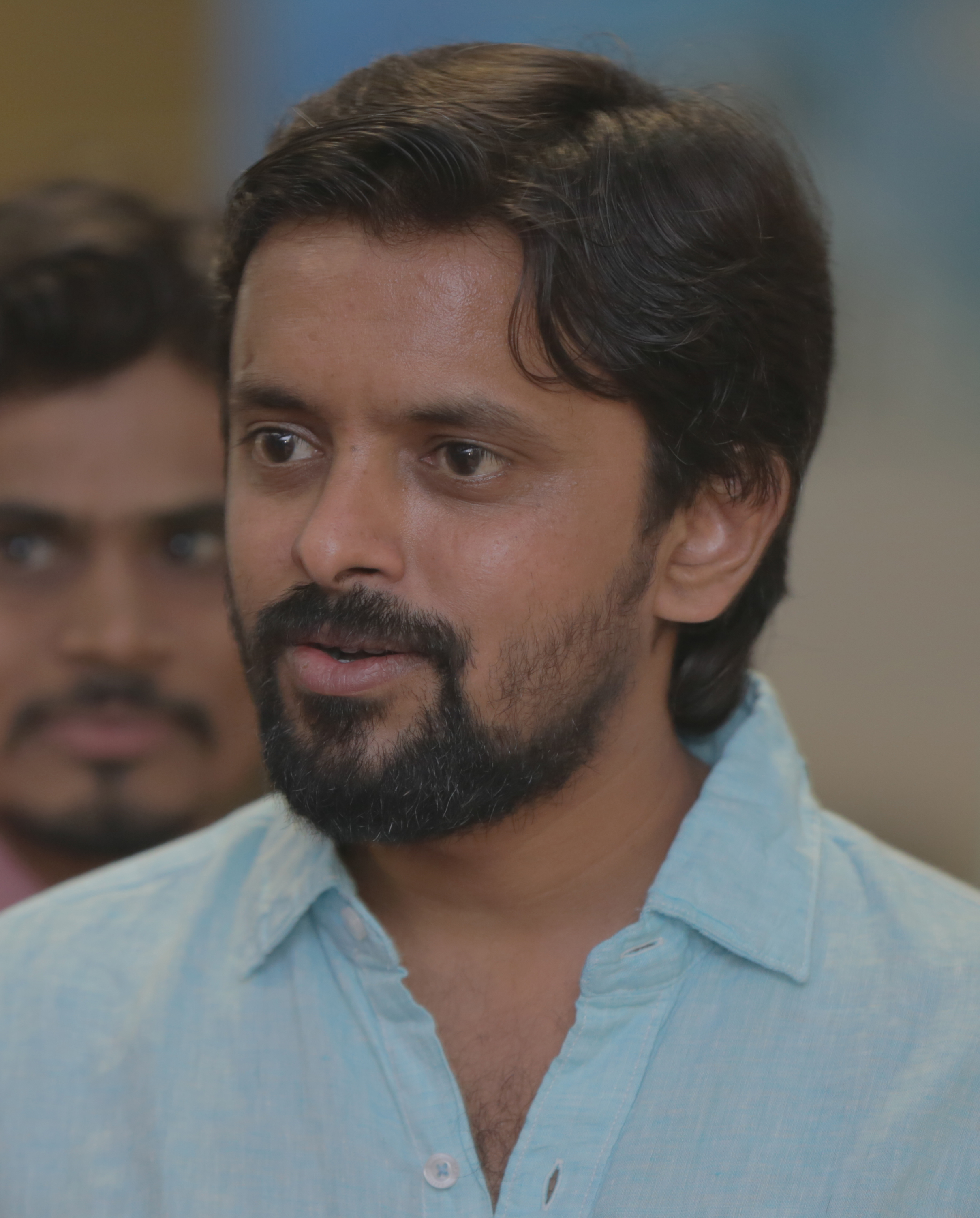
- Prakash in 2017
- Born: Dattatreya Satya Prakash; Kadur, Chikmagalur, Karnataka, India
- Occupations: Writer; Director; Lyricist; Producer; Distributor
- Years active: 2007–present
- Website: Satya Pictures

D. Satya Prakash is an Indian filmmaker in Kannada cinema. His works often focus on social issues and human relationships. His debut film was Rama Rama Re... (2016), which is followed by Ondalla Eradalla (2018). He then directed Man of the Match (2022). His latest venture is X&Y (2025). Before making commercial films, Prakash directed the short film Jayanagara 4th block.

For Rama Rama Re..., Prakash received the Karnataka State Film Award for Director's First Time Best Film. Ondalla Eradalla won two awards at the 66th National Film Awards including the Nargis Dutt Award for Best Feature Film on National Integration.

Prakash was selected as one of 20 "changemakers" by Deccan Herald in 2020 for being "one of the important filmmakers in Kannada today".

== Early life and education ==
D Satya Prakash was born in Kaduru, Chikmagalur district, Karnataka to K C Dattatari, a businessman, and Geetha, a homemaker. He completed schooling in Kaduru, Hassan, and Bangalore.

After completing his Diploma in Computer Sciences from DVS Polytechnic College Shimoga. He shifted to Bangalore to pursue his interest in cricket. He was a part of league level matches and sports events.

== Career ==
Prakash worked as assistant director with T. S. Nagabharana, assisting on films including Nam Yajamanru starring Dr.Vishnuvardhan, and Kamsale Kaisale. During his five years of internship he collaborated with V. Manohar, music director for writing lyrics and was involved in dialogue writing for various scripts as well.

=== Jayanagara 4th Block ===
Jayanagara 4th Block is a story revolving around the friendship between an actor, a florist, and a retired school teacher. It explores the beauty of relationships among strangers and their journey of rediscovering happiness in an inanimate place 4th Block Jayanagar. This was an experimental film highlighting the existence of pure intentions in a society that’s misunderstood. The script was written by the lead actor Dhananjaya; screenplay and direction were by Prakash. The film received more than a million views on YouTube, and won accolades in film festivals.

=== Rama Rama Re ===
Rama Rama Re... was Satya Prakash's debut commercial film. Released on 21 October 2016, it was written and directed by Satya Prakash. It is a story of a convict on death row. The film was remade in Telugu in 2018 as Aatagadaraa Siva by Rockline Venkatesh.

=== Ondalla Eradalla ===
Ondalla Eradalla is about a seven-year-old boy Sameera and his pet cow Banu. The journey of the boy in search of his lost cow, while traveling through city and meeting new people with selfish intentions on the pretext of helping. The film tries to explore the complexities of human nature and qualities such as innocence and empathy masked by selfishness. As the story unfolds, it also unveils the positive thoughts within negatively portrayed people.

=== Man of the Match ===
Man of the Match (film) is D. Satya Prakash's third creative work in cinema. It has been produced jointly by PRK Productions, the company of Kannada Superstar, Puneeth Rajkumar, in collaboration with Satya and Mayura Pictures. The movie follows A Director who calls for an audition and makes a movie out of it by creating conflicts between the artists who attended the audition.

=== X&Y ===
X&Y is D. Satya Prakash's latest venture, produced under the Satya Pictures banner. The film follows the story of an unborn soul who pleads with the Creator for a chance to experience life on Earth. Entrusted with a mission to find his future parents and unite them before he can be born, the soul embarks on his journey. However, once on Earth, he encounters harsh realities, struggles, and emotional turmoil. The vibrant world he had long desired proves far more challenging than expected, leaving him disillusioned and regretful of his decision, ultimately yearning to return to the Creator and renouncing the wish to be born.

== Filmography ==
=== Directed Features ===
| Year | Film | Director | Producer | Notes |
|---|---|---|---|---|
| 2013 | Jayanagar 4th Block | Yes | No | Short Film |
| 2016 | Rama Rama Re | Yes | Yes | |
| 2018 | Ondalla Eradalla | Yes | No | |
| 2022 | Man of the Match | Yes | Yes | Released on Amazon Prime |
| 2025 | X&Y | Yes | Yes | |

=== Writer ===
| Year | Film | Writer | Notes |
|---|---|---|---|
| 2015 | Bhagyaraj | Yes | |
| 2015 | Endendigu | Dialogues | |
| 2017 | Urvi | Dialogues | |
| 2017 | Happy New Year | Yes | Vijay Raghavendra's episode. |
| 2024 | Kaalapatthar | Yes | |
| 2025 | Unlock Raghava | Yes | |

=== Distributor ===
| Year | Film | Notes |
|---|---|---|
| 2022 | Four Walls | Kannada |
| 2022 | Gilki | Kannada |
| 2022 | Son of India | Telugu |
| 2022 | Reddygarintlo Rowdism | Telugu |
| 2022 | Purushothama | Kannada |
| 2022 | Balaraju | Telugu |
| 2022 | Bypassroad | Kannada |
| 2022 | Vikipedia | Kannada |
| 2022 | 3.0 | Kannada |
| 2022 | Shubamangala | Kannada |
| 2022 | Kambalihula | Kannada |
| 2022 | Hubali Dhaba | Kannada |
| 2022 | O | Kannada |
| 2022 | Kasagiputagalu | Kannada |
| 2022 | Kullana Hendati | Kannada |
| 2022 | Dwipatra | Kannada |
| 2022 | Shambo Shiva Shankara | Kannada |
| 2023 | Sri Balaji Photo Studio | Kannada |
| 2023 | Sakuchi | Kannada |
| 2023 | Paalaar | Kannada |
| 2023 | Arambha | Kannada |
| 2023 | Chowkabhara | Kannada |
| 2023 | Ondanki Kadu | Kannada |
| 2023 | Daamayana | Kannada |
| 2023 | Nimmellara Ashirwada | Kannada |
| 2023 | Aura | Kannada |
| 2023 | Bun Tea | Kannada |
| 2023 | Vasantakaalada Hoogalu | Kannada |

=== Lyricist ===
| Year | Film | song |
|---|---|---|
| 2016 | Rama Rama Re... | All songs |
| 2018 | Ondalla Eradalla | All songs |
| 2018 | Churikatte | Sanchondu Illi Sanchari Yagi |
| 2022 | Man of the Match | Enadru Madoke Munchane |
| 2023 | Dooradarshana | Taayi Usire |
| 2023 | Harikathe Alla Girikathe | Gir Gir Gitle Zamana |
| 2025 | X&Y | Kunthi Karna |

== Awards ==
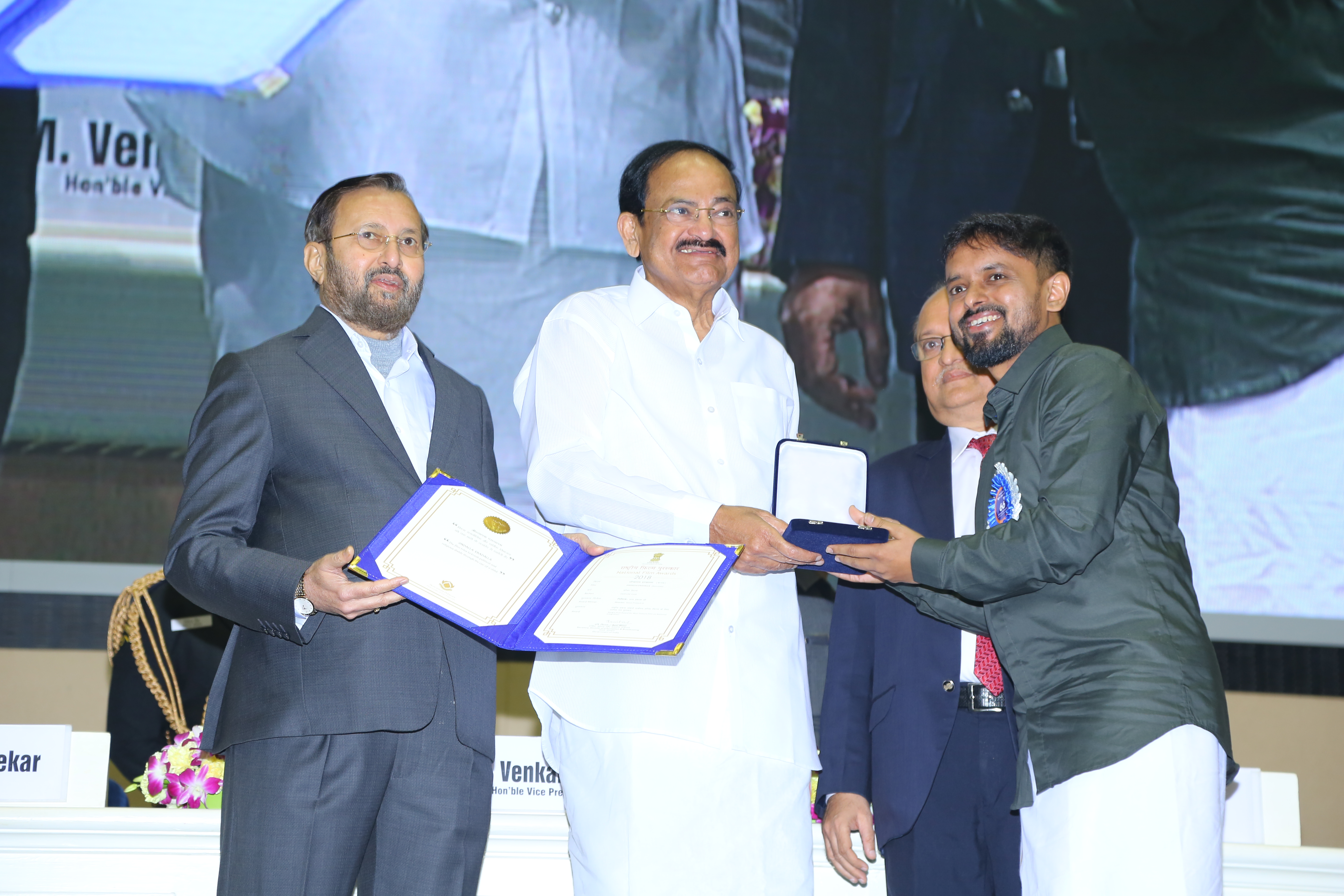
D Satya Prakash receiving National Award from Vice President Shri Venkaiah Naidu.

| Film | Award | Category | Result | Ref. |
|---|---|---|---|---|
| Rama Rama Re | 2016 Karnataka State Film Awards | Best Debutant Director | Won | |
| Rama Rama Re | Bengaluru International Film Festival | First Best Kannada film | Won | |
| Rama Rama Re | 64th Filmfare Awards South | Best Film | Nominated | |
| Ondalla Eradalla | 66th National Film Awards | Best Feature Film on National Integration | Won | |
| Ondalla Eradalla | 2018 Karnataka State Film Awards | Third Best Film | Won | |
| Ondalla Eradalla | Critics Choice Film Awards(CCFA) | Best Kannada Film | Won | |
