= Aahil Khan =

Indian actor (born 1989)

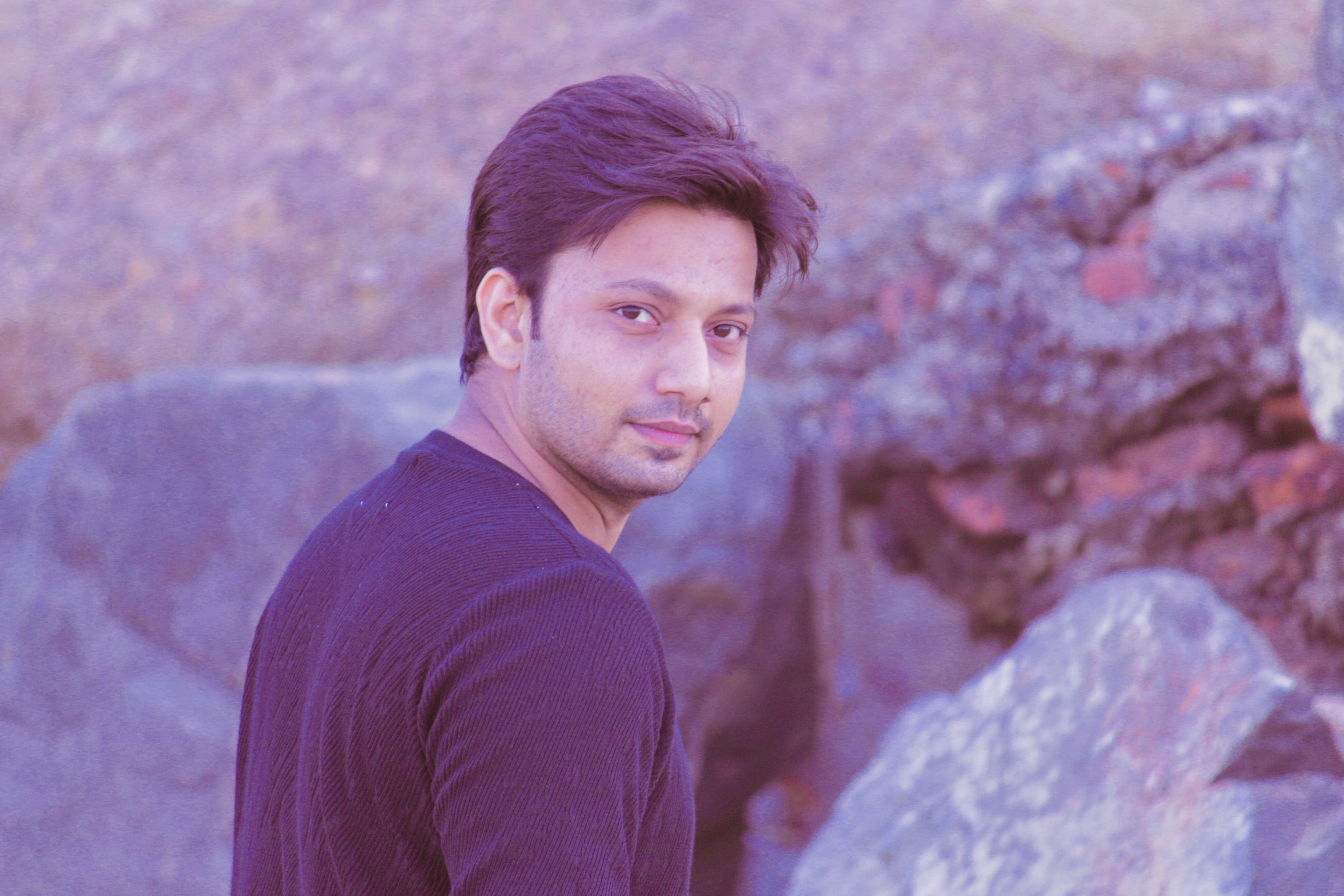
- Born: 4 June 1989 (age 37); Lucknow, Uttar Pradesh, India
- Occupations: Actor; model
- Years active: 2016–present

Aahil Khan is an Indian model and actor (born 4 June 1989), who works in Hindi television and films. He started in Beti – Ghar ka Ujala.

== Career ==
Aahil Khan is from Lucknow, Uttar Pradesh. He started modelling at a young age before moving into acting. Later he started doing acting in television and did a Doordarshan TV show Beti Ghar Ka Ujala in lead. Colors TV show Mahakali – Anth Hi Aarambh Hai, gave him recognition in television industry and then he, then turned to film actor by featuring in the film Dear Dia.

== Filmography ==
=== Television ===
| Year | Title | Role | Channel |
|---|---|---|---|
| 2016 | Baal Krishna | Sugam | Big Magic |
| 2018 | Chandrasekhar | | Star Bharat |
| 2018 | Mahakali – Anth Hi Aarambh Hai | Van Devta | Colors TV |
| 2020 | Manmohini | | Zee TV |
| 2021 | Beti Ghar Ka Ujala | | Doordarshan |
| 2021 | Vighnaharta Ganesh | | Sony TV |
| 2023 | RadhaKrishn | Vayu Dev | Star Bharat |

=== Films ===
Key
| † | Denotes films that have not yet been released |

| Year | Title | Role | Notes |
|---|---|---|---|
| 2022 | Dear Dia | Adi's friend | |
| 2023 | Dil Hai Gray | | |
