= Sari (film) =

- Theatrical release poster
- Directed by: K. S. Ashoka
- Written by: K. S. Ashoka; Vishal Patil (dialogues)
- Produced by: Suresh Nagpal; Akash Nagpal
- Starring: Ajinkya Raut; Ritika Shrotri; Pruthvi Ambaar
- Cinematography: Padmanabhan VS
- Edited by: K. S. Ashoka
- Music by: B. Ajaneesh Loknath; Amitraj; Arijit Chakraborty
- Production company: Canrus Productions
- Distributed by: Reliance Entertainment
- Release date: 5 May 2023
- Running time: 128 minutes
- Country: India
- Language: Marathi

Sari is a 2023 Indian Marathi-language romantic drama film written and directed by K. S. Ashoka, and produced by Suresh Nagpal and Akash Nagpal. The movie is an official remake of the movie Dia. The film stars Ajinkya Raut, Ritika Shrotri and Pruthvi Ambaar with a music score by B. Ajaneesh Loknath Amitraj and Arijit Chakraborty.

== Cast ==
- Ajinkya Raut as Rohit
- Ritika Shrotri as Dia
- Pruthvi Ambaar as Adi
- Mrinal Kulkarni as Dr. Lakshmi "Lucky", Adi's mother
- Sanjay Khapre as Dia's father
- Pankaj Vishnu as Dia's father's friend
- Jyothi Rai as Rohit's sister
- Chandan Ravandur N as Auto Driver
- Gokul Chakravarthy as a passenger on a train
- Vishal Asha as Auto Driver
- Anand N Kumar as Rohit's friend

== Soundtrack ==
The music of the film is composed by Amitraj with one song each by B. Ajaneesh Loknath (in his debut in Marathi cinema; reused "Soul of Dia" song from the original) and Arijit Chakraborty.

All lyrics are written by Manndar Cholkar.

Track listing
No.	Title	Music	Singer(s)	Length
1.	"Sammohini"	Amitraj	Aanandi Joshi	3:18
2.	"Dhim Dhim"	Amitraj	Palak Muchhal	3:35
3.	"Badalali Waryane Disha"	Amitraj	Adarsh Shinde	3:21
4.	"Mala Ka Bhase"	B. Ajaneesh Loknath	Shailey Bidwaika, Sanjith Hegde	3:02
5.	"Odh Hi Tujhi Lage Jeeva"	Rishabh Srivastava	Mohammed Irfan	4:28
Total length:				17:44

== Release ==
=== Theatrical ===
The film was theatrically released on 5 May 2023 across India and released in UK and Ireland on 19 May 2023.

=== Home media ===
The film is available to stream on OTT platform Amazon Prime.

== Reception ==
A reviewer from The Times of India gave 2.0/5 stars and stated that there are many loopholes in the plot and many times the film seems overdramatic. Pratibha Joy of OTTPlay gave the same rating and gave praise to the original film stating: the Kannada original was far more appealing and tugged at one's heartstrings. A reviewer from Maharashtra Times wrote 'Anything can happen in life', definitely comes from watching this movie.
