= Nobin Paul =

- Born: April 11, 1983 (age 43); Kottayam, Kerala
- Occupation: Music Composer
- Years active: 2016 - present

Nobin Paul is an Indian film music composer who primarily works in Kannada film industry.

== Early life ==
Paul was born in Kottayam, Kerala. His family shifted to Bengaluru, Karnataka after his schooling. Prior to entering the film industry, he composed advertising jingles.

== Filmography ==
Year	Title	Songs	Score	Notes	Ref
2016	Rama Rama Re	No	Yes	First Best Film - Karnataka State Film Awards 2016	
2018	Churikatte	No	Yes		
2018	Aatagadhara siva	No	Yes		
2018	Ondalla Eradalla	No	Yes		
2019	Anukta	Yes	Yes		
2019	Devaki	Yes	Yes		
2019	Katha Sangama	Yes	Yes		
2022	777 Charlie	Yes	Yes	National Film Awards 2021 - Best Feature Film in Kannada	
2022	Dr. 56	Yes	Yes		
2023	2018 (film)	Yes	Yes	India's official entry for the Academy Awards (Best International Feature Film) in 2024	
2024	Kotee	No	Yes		

== Awards ==
Year	Film	Award	Category	Result	Ref
2024	2018 (film)	SIIMA	Best Music Director	Nominated	
2023	777 Charlie	SIIMA	Best Music Director	Nominated	
2023	777 Charlie	Filmfare	Best Music Director	Nominated	
