= Ananya Bhat =

Indian playback singer

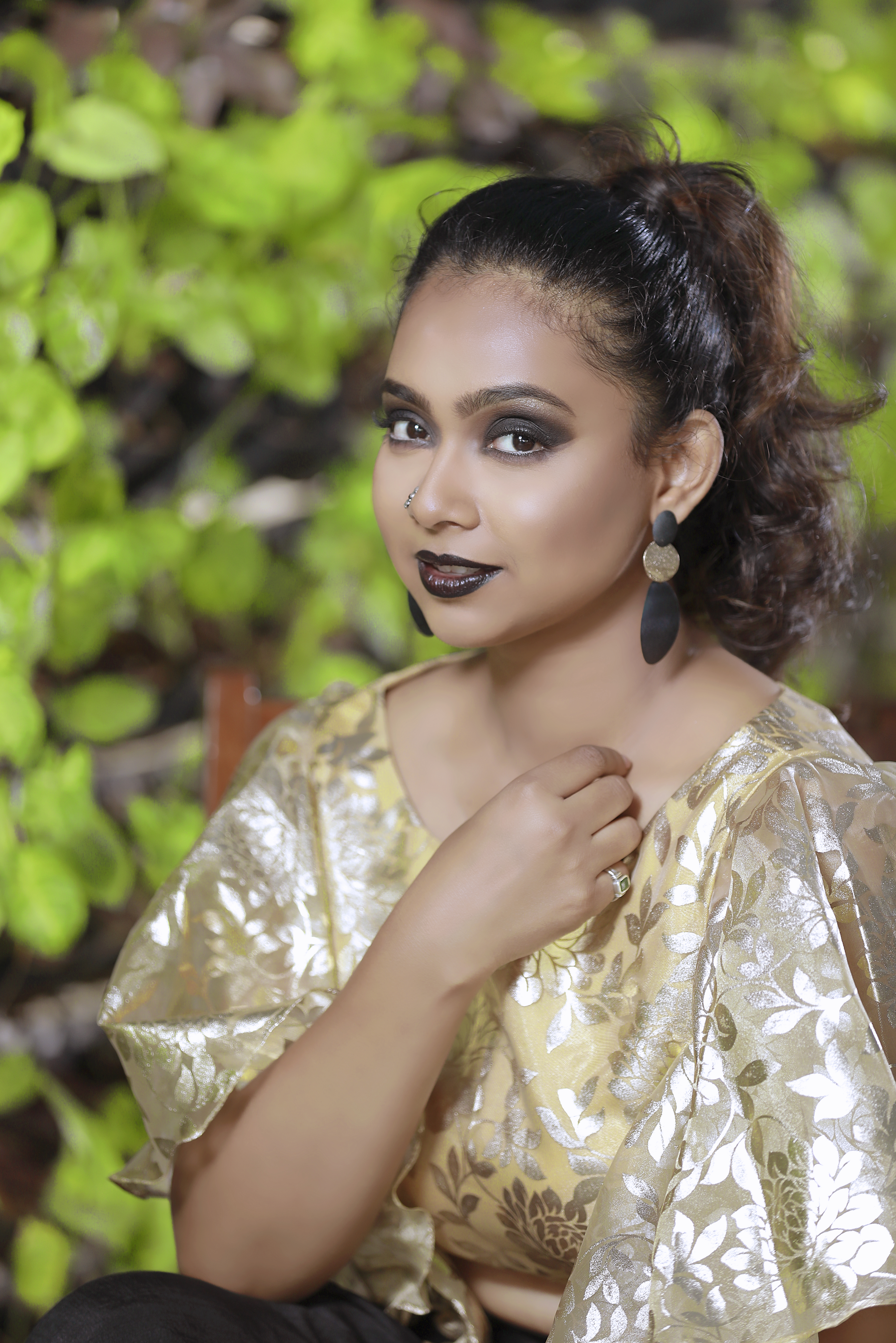
- Ananya Bhat in 2018

Background information
- Born: 1992 or 1993 (age 32–33)
- Genres: Filmi, Carnatic classical
- Occupations: Singer, actress
- Years active: 2017–present

Ananya Bhat is an Indian playback singer who sings in Kannada, Tamil and Telugu. Through her singing career, she received the award called the Filmfare Award for the song "Namma Kaayo Devan", of the film Rama Rama Re... at 64th Filmfare Awards South in 2017.

== Early life and career ==
Born in Ankali, Belagavi district, she was raised in Mysuru, Karnataka. She is currently residing in Bengaluru.

Previously she worked for a playback "Namma Kaayo Devane" in Rama Rama Re... (2016). In 2018, she sang "Hold On" & "Mental Ho Jawa" songs in Tagaru. "Hold On" gave her the SIIMA 2019 for best female playback singer -Kannada and a Best Playback Singer – Female Nomination at 66th Filmfare Awards South. She also did her Telugu debut singing for "Yettagayya shiva" in Aatagadharaa Siva which also garnered her Best Playback Singer – Female Nomination at 66th Filmfare Awards South. Ananya appeared in an episode of Kannadathi, a Kannada daily soap, as herself.

== As singer ==
| Year | Song name | Movie name | Composer(s) | Lyricist(s) | Language |
|---|---|---|---|---|---|
| 2013 | "Nee Thoreda Ghaligeyali" | Lucia | Poornachandra Tejaswi | Raghu Shastri | Kannada |
| 2016 | "Namma Kaayo Devane" | Rama Rama Re... | Vasuki Vaibhav | D Satya Prakash | Kannada |
| 2017 | "Usure Usure" | Karuppan | D. Imman | Yugabharathi | Tamil |
| 2018 | "Mental Ho Jawa" | Tagaru | Charan Raj | Kiran Kaverappa, Vardhik Joseph | Kannada |
| 2018 | "Hold On" | Tagaru | Charan Raj | Yogaraj Bhat | Kannada |
| 2018 | "Nanaghelade" | Sankashta Kara Ganapathi | Ritvik Muralidhar | Nischal S Dambekodi | Kannada |
| 2018 | "Yettagayya Shiva" | Aatagadharaa Siva | Vasuki Vaibhav | Chaitanya Prasad | Telugu |
| 2018 | "Garbadhi" | K.G.F: Chapter 1 | Ravi Basrur | Kinnal Raj, Ravi Basrur | Kannada |
| 2018 | "Sidila Barava" | K.G.F: Chapter 1 | Ravi Basrur | Ravi Basrur | Kannada |
| 2018 | "Dheera Dheera" | K.G.F: Chapter 1 | Ravi Basrur | Ravi Basrur | Kannada |
| 2018 | "Kooti Kanasugala" | K.G.F: Chapter 1 | Ravi Basrur | Kinnal Raj, Ravi Basrur | Kannada |
| 2018 | "Kokh Ke Rath Mein" | K.G.F: Chapter 1 (D) | Ravi Basrur | V. Nagendra Prasad | Hindi |
| 2018 | "Ho Jaane Do Aar Paar" | K.G.F: Chapter 1 (D) | Ravi Basrur | V. Nagendra Prasad | Hindi |
| 2018 | "Sultan" | K.G.F: Chapter 1 (D) | Ravi Basrur | V. Nagendra Prasad | Hindi |
| 2018 | "Karuvinil Enai" | K.G.F: Chapter 1 (D) | Ravi Basrur | Madhura Kavi | Tamil |
| 2018 | "Veesum Soora Kaatin" | K.G.F: Chapter 1 (D) | Ravi Basrur | Madhura Kavi | Tamil |
| 2018 | "Dheera Dheera" | K.G.F: Chapter 1 (D) | Ravi Basrur | Madhura Kavi | Tamil |
| 2018 | "Koodi Kanavil" | K.G.F: Chapter 1 (D) | Ravi Basrur | Madhura Kavi | Tamil |
| 2018 | "Tharagani Baruvaina" | K.G.F: Chapter 1 (D) | Ravi Basrur | Ramajogayya Sastry | Telugu |
| 2018 | "Evvadikevvadu Banisa" | K.G.F: Chapter 1 (D) | Ravi Basrur | Ramajogayya Sastry | Telugu |
| 2018 | "Dheera Dheera" | K.G.F: Chapter 1 (D) | Ravi Basrur | Ramajogayya Sastry | Telugu |
| 2018 | "Alasina Ashalaku" | K.G.F: Chapter 1 (D) | Ravi Basrur | Ramajogayya Sastry | Telugu |
| 2018 | "Garbadhinam" | K.G.F: Chapter 1 (D) | Ravi Basrur | Sudamsu | Malayalam |
| 2018 | "Shwasa Kattin" | K.G.F: Chapter 1 (D) | Ravi Basrur | Sudamsu | Malayalam |
| 2018 | "Dheera Dheera" | K.G.F: Chapter 1 (D) | Ravi Basrur | Sudamsu | Malayalam |
| 2018 | "Koodi Kanavugal" | K.G.F: Chapter 1 (D) | Ravi Basrur | Sudamsu | Malayalam |
| 2019 | "Helade Kelade" | Geetha | Anup Rubens | Ghouse Peer | Kannada |
| 2021 | "Saami Saami" | Pushpa: The Rise (D) | Devi Sri Prasad | Varadaraj Chikkaballapura | Kannada |
| 2021 | "Nagarodi" | Jail | G.V. Prakash Kumar | Arivu | Tamil |
| 2022 | "Shiva Shiva" | Veeram | J Anoop Seelin | V. Nagendra Prasad | Kannada |
| 2022 | "Baglu Tegi Meri Jaan" | Thothapuri | J Anoop Seelin | Vijayaprasad | Kannada |
| 2022 | "Mehabooba" | K.G.F: Chapter 2 | Ravi Basrur | Kinnal Raj | Kannada |
| 2022 | "Mehabooba" | K.G.F: Chapter 2 (D) | Ravi Basrur | Ramajogayya Sastry | Telugu |
| 2022 | "Mehabooba" | K.G.F: Chapter 2 (D) | Ravi Basrur | Madhura Kavi | Tamil |
| 2022 | "Agilam Nee" | K.G.F: Chapter 2 (D) | Ravi Basrur | Madhura Kavi | Tamil |
| 2022 | "Mehabooba" | K.G.F: Chapter 2 (D) | Ravi Basrur | Sudhamsu | Malayalam |
| 2022 | "Mehabooba" | K.G.F: Chapter 2 (D) | Ravi Basrur | Shabbir Ahmed | Hindi |
| 2022 | "Sinnavaada" | Ashoka Vanamlo Arjuna Kalyanam | Jay Krish | Sanapati Bharadwaj Patrudu | Telugu |
| 2022 | "Singara Siriye" | Kantara | B. Ajaneesh Loknath | Pramod Maravanthe | Kannada |
| 2023 | "Onnoda Nadandhaa" | Viduthalai Part 1 | Ilaiyaraaja | Suga | Tamil |
| 2023 | "Kaattumalli" | Viduthalai Part 1 | Ilaiyaraaja | Ilayaraaja | Tamil |
| 2024 | "Dhinam Dhinamum" | Viduthalai Part 2 | Ilaiyaraaja | Ilayaraaja | Tamil |
| 2024 | "Manasula" | Viduthalai Part 2 | Ilaiyaraaja | Ilayaraaja | Tamil |
| 2024 | "Adiye Alangaari" | Thandakaaranyam | Justin Prabhakaran | Uma Devi | Tamil |
| 2024 | "Mele Neeli" | Ajayante Randam Moshanam (D) | Dhibu Ninan Thomas | Nagarjun Sharma | Kannada |
| 2025 | "Yedo Yejanmalodo" | Shashtipoorthi | Ilaiyaraaja | M. M. Keeravani | Telugu |
| 2025 | "Madana Mana Mohini" | Kantara: Chapter 1 | B. Ajaneesh Lokanath | Pramod Maravanthe | Kannada |

== Television ==
| Year | Show | Role | Language | Ref |
|---|---|---|---|---|
| 2020 | Kannadathi | Herself | Kannada | |
