= Dheekshith Shetty =

Indian actor (born 1995)

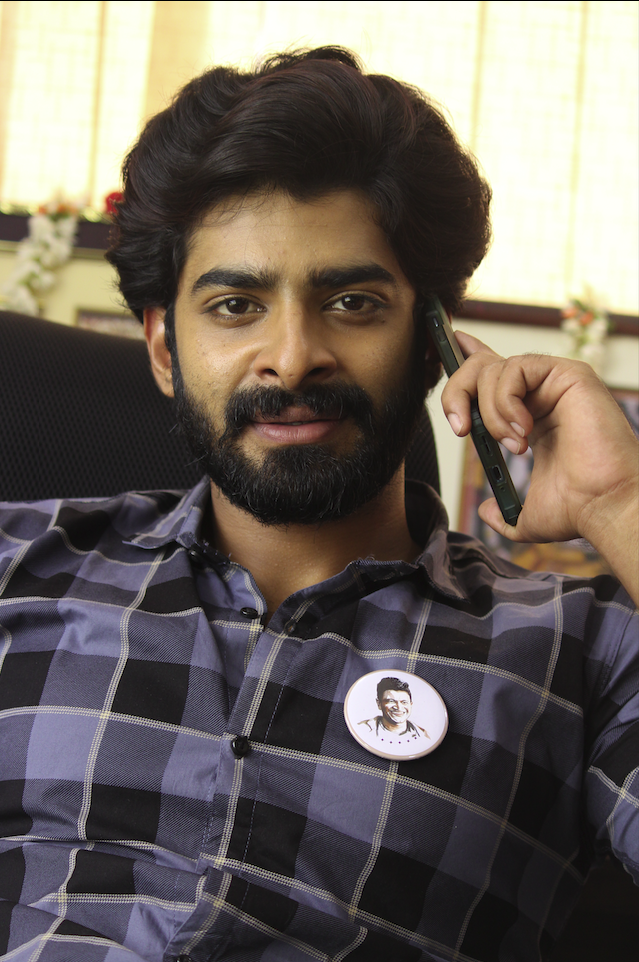
- Shetty in 2022
- Born: 22 December 1995 (age 30); Kundapura, Karnataka, India
- Occupation: Actor
- Years active: 2016−present

Dheekshith Shetty (/ˈdiːkʃɪθ ˈʃɛti/) (born 22 December 1995) is an Indian actor and dancer who predominantly works in Kannada and Telugu films. He is winner of Dance Karnataka Dance celebrity season 1.He rose to prominence with his critically acclaimed performance in the Kannada romantic drama, Dia (2020) which earned him a SIIMA Award nomination and established him as one of the most promising talents in the industry.

Starting his career in Kannada television with shows like Naagini and Preethi Endarenu, Shetty transitioned to films and later expanded into Telugu cinema with notable roles in Mugguru Monagallu (2021) and the blockbuster Dasara (2023) , for which he won the SIIMA Award for Best Supporting Actor – Telugu.

== Career ==
=== Television beginnings (2016–2019) ===
Dheekshith Shetty began his acting career in Kannada television with the soap operas Preethi Endarenu and Saakshi in 2016. His breakthrough came with the supernatural drama Naagini (2016–2020) on Zee Kannada, where he portrayed Arjun/Partha opposite Deepika Das. The show's popularity made him a household name in Karnataka. In 2017, he participated in the reality show Dance Karnataka Dance and emerged as the winner, further boosting his visibility.

=== Film debut and rise in Kannada cinema (2020–2022) ===
Shetty made his feature film debut with K. S. Ashoka's romantic drama Dia (2020), playing Rohit. The film was a critical and commercial success, and his nuanced performance earned him a SIIMA nomination for Best Supporting Actor – Kannada. This role established him as one of the most promising talents in Sandalwood. He also appeared in short films like Oh Fish and Navabelaku during this period.

=== Entry into Telugu cinema and breakthrough (2021–2023) ===
In 2021, Shetty debuted in Telugu cinema with Mugguru Monagallu and later starred in The Rose Villa. His major breakthrough came in 2023 with Dasara, directed by Srikanth Odela, where he played Siddham "Suri" alongside Nani, Keerthy Suresh and Shine Tom Chacko. The film was a box-office hit, and Shetty won the SIIMA Award for Best Supporting Actor – Telugu, also earning a Filmfare nomination.

He also appeared in the anthology series Meet Cute produced by Nani.

=== Recent work and experimentation (2024–present) ===
In 2024, Shetty starred in KTM, portraying four different avatars to depict a character's journey from teenage years to adulthood, showcasing his versatility. He also appeared in Blink, an experimental Kannada film inspired by the Oedipus myth, which received glowing reviews for its bold narrative and Shetty's performance.

Shetty's 2025 projects include The Girlfriend in Telugu co-starring Rashmika Mandanna. Upon release, the film garnered mixed reviews with Sruthi Ganapathy Raman of The Hollywood Reporter India writing, "The Girlfriend, led skilfully by Mandanna and Shetty, might be about toxic relationships and revolve around a conventional heteronormative couple with an alpha-beta equation, but it always makes sure to keep its characters accountable." His next Kannada film, Bank of Bhagyalakshmi and web series Touch Me Not is set for release.

== Filmography ==
=== Film ===
Key
| † | Denotes films that have not yet been released |

List of Dheekshith Shetty film credits
| Year | Title | Role | Language | Notes | Ref. |
|---|---|---|---|---|---|
| 2020 | Oh Fish | | Kannada | Short film | |
| 2020 | Dia | Rohit | Kannada | | |
| 2021 | Mugguru Monagallu | Chandrathreya Kishore Varma | Telugu | | |
| 2021 | The Rose Villa | Ravi | Telugu | | |
| 2022 | Navabelaku | | Kannada | Short film | |
| 2022 | Smile | | Kannada | Short film | |
| 2023 | Dasara | Siddham Suryam "Suri" | Telugu | | |
| 2024 | KTM | Karthik | Kannada | | |
| 2024 | Blink | Apoorva | Kannada | | |
| 2025 | The Girlfriend | Vikram "Vicky" | Telugu | | |
| 2025 | Bank of Bhagyalakshmi | Kanaka | Kannada | | |
| 2026 | KJQ: King Jackie Queen | Partha | Telugu | | |
| 2026 | Bail | Daya Shankar IPS | Kannada | | |
| TBA | Sheegrameva Kalyana Praptirasthu † | Sagar | Kannada | Filming | |
| TBA | Strawberry † | TBA | Kannada | Post-production | |
| TBA | Oppees † | TBA | Malayalam | Filming | |

=== Television ===
List of Dheekshith Shetty television credits
| Year | Title | Role | Network | Language | Notes | Ref. |
|---|---|---|---|---|---|---|
| 2016 | Preethi Endarenu | | Star Suvarna | Kannada | | |
| 2016 | Saakshi | | Udaya TV | Kannada | | |
| 2016–2020 | Naagini | Arjun/Partha | Zee Kannada | Kannada | | |
| 2017 | Dance Karnataka Dance | Contestant | Zee Kannada | Kannada | Winner | |
| 2021 | Kamali | | Zee Kannada | Kannada | Cameo | |
| 2022 | Meet Cute | Siddharth | SonyLIV | Telugu | Segment: "In L(aw)ove" | |
| 2025 | Touch Me Not | Rishi | JioHotstar | Telugu | | |

== Awards and nominations ==
List of awards and nominations received by Dheekshith Shetty
| Year | Award | Category | Work | Result | Ref. |
|---|---|---|---|---|---|
| 2020 | 9th South Indian International Movie Awards | Best Supporting Actor – Kannada | Dia | Nominated | |
| 2024 | 69th Filmfare Awards South | Best Supporting Actor – Telugu | Dasara | Nominated | |
| 2024 | 12th South Indian International Movie Awards | Best Supporting Actor – Telugu | Dasara | Won | |
