= Man of the Match (film) =

- Poster
- Directed by: D. Satya Prakash
- Written by: D. Satya Prakash
- Screenplay by: Padmanabha Bhat Shevkar; Sundar Veena; Nagendra H S D. Satya Prakash
- Produced by: Ashwini Puneeth Rajkumar; Manjunath D D. Satya Prakash
- Starring: Nataraj S. Bhat; Dharmanna Kadooru; Atharva Prakash; Mayuri Nataraj; Shridatta; Brunda Vikram; Chandrashekhar Madabhavi
- Cinematography: Madan Khatokar; Lavit
- Edited by: B S Kemparaju
- Music by: Vasuki Vaibhav
- Production companies: PRK Productions; Satya & Mayura Pictures
- Distributed by: Amazon Prime Video
- Release date: 5 May 2022
- Running time: 114 minutes
- Country: India
- Language: Kannada

Man of the Match is a 2022 Indian Kannada-language satire black comedy written and directed by D. Satya Prakash. Movie produced under PRK Productions banner. The film stars Nataraj S. Bhat, Dharmanna Kadooru, Atharva Prakash, Mayuri Nataraj, Shridatta, Brunda vikram. Satya Prakash uses a film-within-a-film narrative where the main actors play fictionalised versions of themselves. Frustrated over the fact that his acting career not taking off, Nataraj decides to produce a film with his actor friend Dharmanna. The day of auditions in a huge studio provides more drama and surprises than expected, as Nataraj has something different on his mind.

== Cast ==
- Nataraj S. Bhat as himself, director of the film
- Dharmanna Kadooru as himself, producer of the film
- Sunder as himself
- Veena Sunder as herself
- Vasuki Vaibhav as himself, Cameo appearance
- Manjunath D as Swamy, supporting actor
- Atharva Prakash as cutout Hero
- Mayuri Nataraj
- Brunda Vikram as Bhavana, Bhushan fiancée
- Sridatta as Bhushan as Software Engineer
- Sridhar Ram as Shridhar
- Santosh Hasan
- Chandrashekhar Madabhavi as Assistant director "Gandhi"
- BS Kempraju as himself, Editor

== Production ==
D. Satya Prakash wanted to direct a film for Puneeth Rajkumar in a lead role but that did not materialize due to the latter's busy schedule. He decided to make another film with PRK Productions. Director Satya Prakash wrote this story, a decade ago but was not able to make the film. During the first lockdown, he shared the story online with Puneeth Rajkumar, who agreed to produce the film. The entire film was shot in Kanteerava Studios.

Satya Prakash cast Nataraj S Bhat and Dharmanna Kadur as themselves in the roles of a director and a producer respectively. Director worked with them in his debut film. Newcomer Atharva Prakash joined the main cast - he was initially selected for an extra role in the movie.

== Soundtrack ==
Man of the Match

Soundtrack album by Vasuki Vaibhav
- Released: 2022
- Recorded: 2021
- Genre: Feature film soundtrack
- Length: 9:32
- Language: Kannada
- Label: PRK Audio
- Producer: Vasuki Vaibhav

Vasuki Vaibhav chronology
Badava Rascal (2021)	Man of the Match (2022)	Harikathe Alla Girikathe (2022)

Vasuki Vaibhav has worked with D. Satya Prakash for the 4th time as music director. Puneeth Rajkumar has sung a song in the film.

Tracklist
No.	Title	Lyrics	Singer(s)	Length
1.	"Title song"	Yogaraj Bhat, D. Satya Prakash	Vasuki Vaibhav, Darshan	4:31
2.	"Bay Run The Bush"	Yogaraj Bhat, D. Satya Prakash	Vasuki Vaibhav, Gokul Abhishek	2:07
3.	"Rangamandira"	V. Manohar	Puneeth Rajkumar	2:54
Total length:				9:32

== Release ==
Movie released on 5 May 2022 in Amazon Prime Video.
