= Sugarless (film) =

- Theatrical release poster
- Directed by: K. M. Shashidhar
- Written by: K. M. Shashidhar
- Produced by: K. M. Shashidhar
- Starring: Pruthvi Ambaar; Priyanka Thimmesh
- Cinematography: Lavith
- Edited by: Ravichandran
- Music by: J. Anoop Seelin
- Production company: Shashidhar Studios Productions
- Release date: 8 July 2022
- Country: India
- Language: Kannada

Sugarless is a 2022 Indian Kannada-language comedy drama film produced by K. M. Shashidhar in his directorial debut. The film stars Pruthvi Ambaar and Priyanka Thimmesh. It revolves around a 28-year old man getting diagnosed with type 2 diabetes, but choosing to conceal it from his lover. The film was released on 8 July 2022.

== Plot ==
28-year old Venkatesh meets Mahalakshmi and falls in love with her. Shortly before the two are to marry, Venkatesh is diagnosed with type 2 diabetes, but he chooses to conceal this fact from Mahalakshmi.

== Cast ==
- Pruthvi Ambaar as Venkatesh
- Priyanka Thimmesh as Mahalakshmi
- Dharmanna Kadur as Venkatesh's colleague
- H. G. Dattatreya as a neglected father
- Naveen Padil as a pessimist
- Honnavalli Krishna as a bride's deaf father
- S. Narayan as a doctor
- Nitesh Nittur as PJ Ramesh

== Production ==
In May 2020, it was announced that producer K. M. Shashidhar would be making his directorial debut with a film revolving around diabetes. The story and screenplay were written by Shashidhar, while the dialogues were written by Guruprasad, with Lavith as cinematographer. The title Sugarless was announced on 11 August, with Pruthvi Ambaar and Priyanka Thimmesh as the leading actors the same month. According to Shashidhar, he preferred "content-oriented" scripts over the numerous action and romance-centric ones narrated to him earlier, and wanted to make one such film. He eventually decided to make a film with diabetes as its theme as he believed the subject was not yet explored in Kannada cinema, and since he himself is diabetic, used that as inspiration. Shashidhar believed that "a subject that explores the stigma that is associated with this disease will reach out to every household".

== Soundtrack ==
The music was composed by J. Anoop Seelin.

Track listing
| No. | Title | Singer(s) | Length |
|---|---|---|---|
| 1. | "Title Track" | Naveen Sajju | 3:44 |
| 2. | "Nam Thayane" | Sanjith Hegde | 4:10 |
| Total length: | | | 7:54 |

== Release and reception ==
Sugarless was cleared by the censor board with a U certificate without any cuts, and released on 8 July 2022. Sunayana Suresh of The Times of India rated the film 3 stars out of 5, saying it is "entertaining for those who seek those old-school comedies that one saw with actors in the 90s and early 2000s. It definitely makes for a light watch, with good references and homages too". Y. Maheswara Reddy of Bangalore Mirror wrote that Shashidhar "deserves appreciation for not only selecting the right subject but also aptly narrating it to create awareness about diabetes. The positive element of this movie is that it narrates how diabetics can lead a healthy life like others provided good and healthy food habits".

A. Sharadhaa of The New Indian Express wrote, "Sugarless touches upon a grave topic accompanied by plenty of laughs. Credit should go to the director as the film acts as a guide to millions who are suffering from the disorder. It also features diverse actors, which makes Sugarless an absorbing watch". M V Vivek of Deccan Herald reviewed the film more negatively, saying it "is that kind of a film that pique's your curiosity with its offbeat title. It then deceives you by not doing anything about its potential". Prathibha Joy of OTTPlay also gave a negative review, saying, "The only saving grace, if one can call it so, is leading man Pruthvi. He is earnest in his scenes, but is, unfortunately let down by the weak script".
