= Dear Dia =

- Dear Dia Poster
- Directed by: K. S. Ashoka
- Written by: K S Ashoka; Tariq Mohammad (dialogues)
- Produced by: Kamlesh Singh Kushwaha
- Starring: Mihika Kushwaha; Pruthvi Ambaar; Ujjwal Sharma
- Cinematography: Ashok Mishra
- Edited by: Akshay Kumar
- Music by: Score: Sajan Patel; Ameya Nare; Songs: Rishabh Srivastava; Mahesh Matkar-Rakesh; Kharvi-Sandeep Sharma
- Production company: Netrix Entertainment
- Distributed by: White Lion Entertainment
- Release date: 10 June 2022
- Running time: 144 minutes
- Country: India
- Language: Hindi

Dear Dia is a 2022 Indian Hindi-language romantic drama film written and directed by K. S. Ashoka. A remake of his Kannada film Dia (2020), the film stars Mihika Kushwaha, Pruthvi Ambaar, and Ujjwal Sharma.

The film was released on 10 June 2022. Unlike the original, Hindi remake went unnoticed due to poor buzz and promotions.

== Cast ==
- Mihika Kushwaha as Dia
- Pruthvi Ambaar as Adi
- Ujjwal Sharma as Rohit
- Mrinal Kulkarni as Adi's mother
- Aahil Khan as Adi's friend

== Soundtrack ==
Track listing
No.	Title	Lyrics	Music	Singer(s)	Length
1.	"Mann Uda Uda Jaye"	Rakesh Kharvi - Amit Sagar	Mahesh Matkar - Rakesh Kharvi	Jubin Nautiyal	4:16
2.	"Tuk Tuk Tukur Tuk"	Rakesh Kharvi	Rakesh Kharvi - Sandeep Sharma	Palak Muchhal	3:05
3.	"Bawra Mann"	Laado Suwalka	Rishabh Srivastava	Shankar Mahadevan	3:35
4.	"Deedar Hai"	Laado Suwalka	Rishabh Srivastava	Jyotica Tangri, Rishabh Srivastava	4:12
5.	"Humnava"	Laado Suwalka	Rishabh Srivastava	Rishabh Srivastava	4:31
Total length:					19:39

== Reception ==
A critic from The Times of India wrote that "A remake of the Kannada film, Dia (2020), Dear Dia is a sweet movie that will make you reach for the tissue box a few times".
