= Kothalavadi =

- Theatrical release poster
- Directed by: Sriraj
- Written by: Sriraj
- Produced by: Pushpa Arunkumar
- Starring: Pruthvi Ambaar; Kavya Shaiva
- Edited by: Ramisetty Pavan
- Music by: Songs: Vikas Vasishta; Abhinandan Kashyap; Score: Abhinandan Kashyap
- Production company: KRG Studios
- Release date: 1 August 2025
- Country: India
- Language: Kannada

Kothalavadi is a 2025 Indian Kannada-language action drama film written and directed by Sriraj. The film stars Pruthvi Ambaar and Kavya Shaiva. The film was released on 1 August 2025 to mixed reviews. The film faced multiple controversies after its release and became a topic among media.

== Plot ==
Set in the drought-stricken village of Kothalavadi, nestled on the banks of the Cauvery River, the film explores how poverty and desperation push an entire community into moral compromise. The villagers, crushed under mounting debts and repeated crop failures, have mortgaged their lands to Lagori Babu (Chethan Gandharva), a ruthless moneylender who thrives on their misery. Amid this bleak scenario, Gujari Babu (Gopal Krishna Deshpande), a cunning scrap dealer with political ambitions, enters the scene. He convinces the villagers that the sand from their river belongs to them, not the government, and lures them into illegal sand mining, promising quick wealth and liberation from debt.

At the heart of the story is Mohana (Pruthvi Ambaar), a daily wage worker and orphan who dreams of a modest life with Manji (Kavya Shaiva), an Anganwadi teacher. Initially reluctant, Mohana becomes Gujari Babu's trusted aide, drawn into the vortex of greed and violence. As the mining operation expands, tensions escalate between the villagers and law enforcement. A violent clash occurs when a police team led by Inspector (Bala Rajwadi) raids a dredging site, leaving several officers injured. This prompts Superintendent of Police Parashuram (Rajesh Nataranga) and Commissioner Ananta Padmanabha (Avinash) to intervene, attempting to educate the villagers about the environmental and legal consequences of their actions.

Meanwhile, political stakes rise as Malini Thamanna (Manasi Sudhir), backed by a major party, challenges Gujari Babu's dominance, turning the village into a battleground of ambition and survival. Mohana, torn between loyalty to Babu and love for Manji, begins to question his choices as blood is spilled and tragedy looms. The narrative culminates in a tense showdown where greed, betrayal, and power collide, forcing the villagers to confront a stark choice: break free from exploitation or be consumed by it.

== Cast ==
- Pruthvi Ambaar as Mohana
- Gopalkrishna Deshpande as Ramesh Babu aka Gujari Babu
- Rajesh Nataranga as Superintendent of Police Parashuram
- Avinash as Commissioner Ananta Padmanabha
- Bala Rajwadi as the police inspector
- Kavya Shaiva as Manji
- Mansi Sudhir as Malini Thamanna
- Raghu Ramanakoppa
- Chethan Gandarva as Lagori Babu

== Soundtrack ==
All music is composed by Vikas Vasishta, except where noted.

Track listing
No.	Title	Lyrics	Music	Singer(s)	Length
1.	"Mungaru Maleyemba"	Pramod Maravanthe		Nishan Rai, Sunidhi Ganesh	2:45
2.	"Kothalavadi Title Track"	Kinnal Raj	Abhinandan Kashyap	Vyasraj Sosale	2:38
3.	"Raja Neenu Rani Naanu"	Ghous Peer		Nishan Rai, Surabhi Bharadwaj	3:14
4.	"Hane Baraha"	Kinnal Raj		Siddarth Belmannu	2:40

== Reception ==
A critic from Bangalore Mirror rated the film 3/5 stars and wrote, "on the whole, the movie is worth a watch". Susmita Sameera of The Times of India gave the film the same rating and wrote, "With powerful performances and technically grand execution, it impresses on several fronts. However, the lack of a compelling story and finesse in the screenplay holds it back from making a deeper impact".

== Controversies ==
Kothalavadi faced multiple controversies after its release in 2025. These disputes involved allegations of non-payment, legal complaints, and financial fraud, drawing significant attention from the Kannada film industry and media.

=== Non-Payment Allegations ===
Several supporting actors, including Mahesh Guru and Swarnalatha, accused the production team of failing to pay their agreed remuneration. Mahesh Guru claimed he worked for three months, completed dubbing, and participated in promotions without receiving any payment. Swarnalatha alleged she was promised ₹48,000 but received only ₹35,000 after repeated follow-ups. These revelations sparked debates about transparency and fair treatment of supporting artists in the industry.

=== Viral Video and Industry Backlash ===
Mahesh Guru's video detailing his ordeal went viral on social media, amplifying the controversy. He accused the production team of ignoring calls and excluding him from promotional events. The video highlighted systemic issues regarding accountability and respect for theatre artists transitioning to cinema.

=== Legal Complaints and Defamation ===
In response to the allegations, director Sriraj filed a defamation complaint against Swarnalatha, claiming her statements damaged his reputation and that of the production house. A non-cognizable report (NCR) was registered at Talaghattapura Police Station, indicating the dispute could escalate into a legal battle.

=== Fraud Allegations Against Promoter ===
In Mid-November 2025, producer Pushpa Arun Kumar lodged a police complaint against promoter Harish Arasu, accusing him of cheating her out of approximately ₹65 lakh allocated for film promotions. She alleged that despite receiving substantial funds, Harish failed to deliver promised publicity, forcing actor Yash to personally fund trailer promotions. The FIR includes charges of cheating, criminal intimidation, and defamation
