= Ayana (film) =

Indian film

- Official poster
- Directed by: Gangadhar Salimath
- Starring: Deepak Subramanya; Apoorva Soma
- Cinematography: Varun D.K.
- Edited by: Ravikumar M.
- Music by: Shriyansh Shreeram; Arjun Rajkumar
- Production company: Dees Films
- Release date: 8 September 2017
- Country: India
- Language: Kannada

Ayana is a 2017 Kannada-language film directed by Gangadhar Salimath. The film is set in Bengaluru and features newcomers.

== Cast ==
- Deepak Subramanya as Aditya Adi
- Apoorva Soma
- Karthik
- Ramesh Bhat
- Sriharsha
- Goutham
- Vedashree
- Nagashree Moksha

== Production ==
The cast and crew are debutantes who worked in a technology company.

== Reception ==
Sunayana Suresh of The Times of India said that "What works for Ayana is that it is fresh and has certain scenes that are beautifully shot. The flipside to this is that the film comprises of mainly newcomers and some of the crucial scenes end up coming across as rehearsed and not too natural, which brings down the realistic treatment that the cinema aims to show". A. Sharadhaa of The New Indian Express opined that "The story is fresh, but unfortunately the film fails in its screenplay. The first half is dull even when there was scope for creative storytelling, but the second half adds more weight to the narrative".

== Home media ==
The film is available on Netflix.

== Accolades ==
Karnataka State Film Awards

- First Best Director
