= Mugguru Monagallu (2021 film) =

2021 film by Abhilash Reddy Gopidi

- Theatrical release poster
- Directed by: Abhilash Reddy Gopidi
- Screenplay by: Apparla Sai Kalyan; Abhilash Reddy Gopidi
- Story by: Apparla Sai Kalyan
- Produced by: P. Achyut Ramarao
- Starring: Srinivasa Reddy; Dheekshith Shetty; Vennala Ramarao
- Cinematography: Anji
- Edited by: Bonthala Nageswara Reddy
- Music by: Chinna
- Production company: Chitra Mandhir Studio
- Release date: 6 August 2021
- Running time: 120 minutes
- Country: India
- Language: Telugu

Mugguru Monagallu (transl. Three courageous men) is a 2021 Indian Telugu-language comedy thriller film directed by Abhilash Reddy Gopidi. Produced by P. Achyut Ramarao through Chitra Mandhir Studio, the film stars Srinivasa Reddy, Dheekshith Shetty and Vennala Ramarao in lead roles. The film was released on 6 August 2021.

== Plot ==
The plot centers on three characters. One is blind Vennala Ramarao as Deepak, an expert dog instructor. Another is the deaf Srinivasa Reddy as Sushanth, who works at an internet service provider company. The last is dumb Dheekshith Shetty as Chandrathreya Kishore, a librarian. The movie concerns the serial murders of politicians taking place in Hyderabad, and how these three people along with the police nab the killer.

== Cast ==
- Srinivasa Reddy as Sushanth, a deaf person
- Dheekshith Shetty as Chandrathreya Kishore Varma, a dumb librarian
- Vennala Ramarao as Deepak, a blind person
- Raja Ravindra as ACP Damodar
- Thummala Narsimha Reddy as Shambavi Nayakar
- Nassar
- Twisha Sharma as Anjali D., a dumb person, Kishore's love interest
- Swetha Varma as Preethi
- Gemini Suresh
- Bhadram as Murugesan
- Chetan Krishna
- Josh Ravi
- Jabardasth Sunny
- Surya as Swetha Varma's father

== Production ==
Filming was done in the second half of 2020. The title of the film is borrowed from K. Raghavendra Rao's 1994 Telugu film of the same name.

== Soundtrack ==
All music is composed by Suresh Bobbili.

Telugu (OST)
No.	Title	Lyrics	Singer(s)	Length
1.	"O Pilla Nee Valla"	Kadali	Yazin Nizar	3:37
Total length:				3:37

== Release and reception ==
In July 2021, the release date of the film was announced as 6 August 2021. The film was premiered on Amazon Prime Video on 2 October 2021.
