= Ankali =

- Town
- Location in Karnataka, India Ankali (India)
- Coordinates: 16°32′27.167″N 74°40′17.128″E
- Country: India
- State: Karnataka
- District: Belgaum
- Talukas: Chikodi

Population (2001)
  - Total: 11,593

Languages
  - Official: Kannada
- Time zone: UTC+5:30 (IST)
- Postal code: 591213

Ankali is a town in the southern state of Karnataka, India. It is located in the Chikodi taluk of Belgaum district in Karnataka.

== Demographics ==
As of 2001 India census, Ankali had a population of 11593 with 5959 males and 5634 females.

== See also ==
- Belgaum
- Districts of Karnataka
