= 6-5=2 =

2013 Kannada-language horror film

- Theatrical Poster
- Directed by: K. S. Ashoka
- Written by: K. S. Ashoka
- Produced by: D. Krishna Chaitanya
- Starring: Darshan Apoorva; Krishna Prakash; Vijay Chendoor; Pallavi; Tanuja; Mruthyunjaya
- Cinematography: Keerthi B. L. Shankar Aradhya Shankar; B. K. Mahesh
- Production company: Swarnalatha Production
- Release date: 29 November 2013
- Running time: 134 minutes
- Country: India
- Language: Kannada
- Budget: ₹30 Lakhs
- Box office: ₹5.00 crore

6-5=2 is a 2013 Kannada found footage horror film, written and directed by K S Ashoka in his directoral debut. It is the first found footage film in Kannada. The plot revolves around a fatal trek accident. The film was reported to have taken its inspiration from the 1999 American independent film The Blair Witch Project. The film was remade in Hindi in 2014 with the same title.

== Plot ==
On 28 October 2010, Ramesh, Naveen, Kumar, Prakash, Deepa and Soumya - hailing from Mandya and Bangalore plan for a trek to an undisclosed mountain in the Western Ghats. Among them four die, one disappears, and one manages to return to civilization.

Ramesh carries a Full HD camera intending to shoot a trek documentary. Strange incidents take place that make them believe in the existence of evil and their life is at risk. They manage to record the ordeal they go through in the trek. Nine days later Ramesh's camera is found by forest guards involved in the rescue operation and this recovered video is presented in the movie.

=== Day 1 ===
Ramesh, Naveen and Kumar join Prakash at his village near Mandya. They get together to discuss their childhood memories and about their trek and then someone stares at them at the village's entry.

=== Day 2 ===
Deepa and Soumya join the group. After they get together they pack the necessary things and travel to Mysore. From there they travel to the starting point of the trek trail that is supposedly 180 km (110 mi) from Mysore.

=== Day 3 ===
The group starts trekking after entering their names and addresses in a forest department check-post at the beginning of the trail. After hiking for a few hours through dense forest and steep climbs they all are tired and decide to take an early break. Ramesh and Prakash leave with the camera to fetch water from a nearby stream while the rest of the group prepare the camp site. While Prakash fills water the camera's light goes off suddenly and they hear a loud noise. Startled by the noise, Ramesh and Prakash frantically try to switch on the camera light. When they finally manage to get the light working they don't find anything out of the ordinary near the stream. Ramesh brushes it off thinking it could be some stone slipping into the water or some animal and they join their group back at the camp site.

The crew continues further. When they reach mid-jungle, Ramesh finds a tree that is very strange; there are many skulls attached to the branches of the tree. Ramesh takes a skull with him. When he hears a female voice addressing him as "RAMESHAA" he is scared. Here begins the real threat to their life.

=== Day 4 ===
The next day morning Prakash is found suffering from a fever and the other five leave him and continue on. All of them reach the top of the mountain and Ramesh keeps the skull on top of the hill then they take a photo. The bag that Ramesh is carrying catches fire spontaneously. On their way back they try to go to Prakash who had fever. They heard his voice but are unable to reach him and lose their way. Sowmya suddenly says that this could be an evil act. Naveen has a plan; he keeps a box in the middle and challenges the evil to come and just turn the box over. Within a few seconds we see that there is a huge explosion and all five run for their lives. They take rest in the night in the jungle itself. In the middle of the night something comes and hits Ramesh in his back and he falls down. Everybody wakes up after a few minutes and checks Ramesh's back and they find that evil has left a hand mark on Ramesh's back. When asked by Ramesh, Naveen says nothing has happened.

=== Day 5 ===
The next morning they try to find the way to the city. Sowmya is very tired and suddenly falls unconscious. Naveen and Kumar go to fetch some water. Deepa and Ramesh hear Naveen voice for help and both of them go to help them, then suddenly Sowmya jumps in the air and is floating for a few seconds and then falls in the same position as she was lying before. In the meanwhile, all 4 come back. Then Sowmya gets up and all of them continue. Kumar is asked to climb a tree and check if he can see the way to the city. He comes down saying that he can see only the jungle. But when he comes down he starts putting on his socks and shoes and says that he actually saw the way back and he didn't say so at first because he was scared of being left behind. All of them are happy and they continue the journey. In the evening Ramesh and Kumar go to bring back water and on their way back they have a conversation. Kumar silently goes towards a tree and starts to rub his face against the tree. Ramesh is shocked and he goes near Kumar. Then Kumar turns around and sees Ramesh. Ramesh is astonished to find Kumar's face ruptured. Then Kumar runs away. Ramesh tries to follow him but he loses Kumar. Then Ramesh reaches the crew. Deepa, Sowmya, Ramesh, and Naveen decide to sleep and continue the search for him. After a while the camera automatically switches off. After some time the camera is back on and we see Kumar lying behind but nobody notices him. They find Deepa in a terrible condition and Naveen picks her up and all of them decide to rest. In the night Ramesh wakes up and starts vomiting, Sowmya gets up and accompanies him to find water.

Now Deepa suddenly gets up, gets a big stone, and throws it at Naveen who is sleeping. Naveen's head is smashed completely and he dies immediately. Then Deepa finds a knife and suddenly slits her own throat and dies. Ramesh comes back shouting something about Sowmya, who presumably went missing. But to his surprise, he sees both Naveen and Deepa dead. In the end, Ramesh is killed by the supernatural entity. He is shown headless and being dragged away by the entity.

The only person who returns is Prakash. After a few days the camera of Ramesh is found and it is being now shown in theaters.

== Cast ==
To live up to the found footage claim the movie does not reveal the cast and crew. There are no opening or end credits. Cast and crew names were finally revealed in an interview with a Bangalore-based newspaper.

- Darshan Apoorva as Ramesh
- Krishna Prakash as Naveen
- Vijay Chendoor as Thigne Kumar
- Pallavi as Sowmya
- Tanuja as Deepa
- Mruthyunjaya as Prakash

== Production ==
Movie was made in a shoestring budget of Rs. 30 lakhs by Swarnalatha Production. Writer and director KS Ashoka drew inspiration from supernatural stories he heard from a forest guard during one of his treks in 2011, and from The Blair Witch Project. It took six months for him to finalize the script. Film was primarily shot in Coorg, and a few parts in Bangalore University campus.

== Reception ==
=== Critical response ===
A critic from The Times of India scored the film at 3 out of 5 stars and says "While Ramesh, Naveen, Prakash, Deepa and Sowmya have given life to their roles, Kumar needs a special mention for his natural delivery of dialogues". S. Shiva Kumar from The Hindu wrote "I trudged out totally disappointed that the director had missed a chance to make a meaningful film. I was not surprised when critics generously doled out stars hailing Dyavre as path breaking".

== Remake ==
A Hindi remake of the movie was made with the same title and released in 2014. In Telugu, it was dubbed and released as Chitram Kadu Nizam.
