= Dooradarshana =

Indian Kannada-language comedy-drama Family film

- Directed by: Sukesh Shetty
- Written by: Sukesh Shetty
- Produced by: Rajesh Bhat
- Starring: Pruthvi Ambaar; Sundar Veena; Ayaana; Harini Shreekanth
- Cinematography: Arun Siresjh
- Edited by: Pradeep R Rao
- Music by: Vasuki Vaibhav
- Release date: 3 March 2023
- Running time: 139 minutes
- Country: India
- Language: Kannada

Dooradarshana is a 2023 Indian Kannada-language film written and directed by Sukesh Shetty, and produced by Rajesh Bhat. The film stars Pruthvi Ambaar, Ayaana, Sundar, Veena and Harini Shreekanth, with a music score by Vasuki Vaibhav.

== Cast ==
- Pruthvi Ambaar as Manu
- Ayaana as Mythri
- Sundar Veena as Ramakrishna Bhat
- Raghu Ramanakoppa as Srinivas
- Ugram Manju as Kitty
- Harini Shreekanth as Sulochanna
- Deepak Rai Panaje as Pandu
- Huli Kartik as Pradeep
- Suraj Comedy Kiladigalu as Dinesh
- Surya Kundapur as D'Souza

== Release ==
Dooradarshana was released on 03 March 2023 in India.

== Reception ==
Vijaya Karnataka gave 3.5 out of 5 and wrote "The film talks about TV days people who lived around the '90s this movie is guaranteed to relive the excitement and desires of the wonder of TV in their hometowns."
