= KTM (film) =

2024 Indian romantic drama film

- Theatrical release poster
- Directed by: Aruna
- Written by: Aruna
- Produced by: Vinay Kumar H; Rakshay SV
- Starring: Dheekshith Shetty; Sanjana Doss; Kaajal Kunder
- Cinematography: Naveen Kumar Challa
- Edited by: Arjun Kittu
- Music by: Chetan Rao
- Production company: Mahasimha Movies
- Release date: 16 February 2024
- Running time: 149 minutes
- Country: India
- Language: Kannada

KTM is a 2024 Indian Kannada-language romantic drama film directed by Aruna and produced by Mahasimha Studios. The film stars Dheekshith Shetty, Sanjana Doss, and Kaajal Kunder. The title of the film KTM is abbreviated from the main characters names Karthik-Tanya-Mercy.

KTM was released theatrically on 16 February 2024 to mixed reviews from critics.

== Cast ==
- Dheekshith Shetty as Karthik Bhat
- Sanjana Doss as Mercy
- Kaajal Kunder as Tanya Bhat

== Production ==
In April 2020, it was announced that Dheekshith Shetty signed the film titled KTM. He wrapped up the second schedule of the filming in September 2020. The third schedule was supposed to happen in the following months of 2020 but halted due to the COVID-19 pandemic. In February 2021, the filming of the third schedule resumed with Sanjana Doss playing the female lead of the film. To play the teenage version of the lead character Dheekshith lost seven kilogrammes of weight. Later, he gained weight to play the depressed state of the lead character. The film was shot in Kundapur, Bangalore and Udupi.

== Soundtrack ==
The soundtrack of the film was composed by Chetan Rao.

Track listing
No.	Title	Lyrics	Singer(s)	Length
1.	"Ella Neenene"	Dhananjay Ranjan	Sanjith Hegde, Chetan Rao	3:51
2.	"Nannusiru"	Abhinandan Deshpriya	Chetan Rao	4:24
3.	"Sojiga Sojiga"	Arasu Anthare	Sanjith Hegde	3:17
4.	"Oorakaayuva Dyaavarange"	Abhinandan Deshpriya	B. Jayshree Devi
5.	"Ayayyo"	Abhinandan Deshpriya	Anthony Daasan, Aarav Joshi, Chetan Rao	3:04

== Reception ==
A critic from The Times of India gave the film three-and-a-half out of five stars and wrote, "Love is the central theme of KTM, which portrays different emotions of youngsters, especially college-goers. The movie has been made keeping in mind both college students and their parents and can be enjoyed by both in theatres." Pranati A S of Deccan Herald gave it one out of five stars and wrote, "The film starts off as a feel-good coming-of-age romantic drama set in Udupi. But, the focus shifts to the protagonist who develops severe anger issues after the death of his best friend. And that's where it remains."

A critic from Times Now gave the film three out of five stars and wrote, "KTM embarks on a journey through the life of Karthik, portrayed with depth and sincerity by Dheekshith Shetty." A Sharadhaa of Cinema Express gave it three out of five stars and wrote, "Like every love story, real or reel, KTM has its strengths and drawbacks. However, Karthik’s journey, his crush on Tanya, and his love for Mercy bring a fresh perspective to the actors’ performances."

Prathibha Joy of OTTplay gave it two-and-a-half out of five stars and wrote, "KTM is desperately attempts to masquerade as an intense love story, but falls woefully short. The lead cast tries valiantly to salvage it, which, in the absence of a strong plot and narrative, doesn't do much good." Shashiprasad S M of The South First gave it two-and-a-half out of five stars and wrote, "The base of the love story is universal, with some fresh presentation. Watch KTM for Dheekshith Shetty and Sanaja Doss."

Vivek M.V. of The Hindu wrote, "This coming-of-age Kannada film, starring Dheekshith Shetty and Sanjana Doss, is riddled with stereotypes, and even the fine performances cannot save it".

== Home media ==
The satellite rights of the film were acquired by Star Suvarna and premiered on 21 April 2024.
