= Rama Rama Re... =

- Theatrical Poster
- Directed by: D. Satya Prakash
- Written by: D. Satya Prakash
- Screenplay by: Dhananjay Ranjan; Nagendra H S D. Satya Prakash
- Story by: D. Satya Prakash
- Produced by: Kannada Kolour Cinemas
- Starring: K Jayaram; Nataraj; Dharmanna Kadur; Bimbashree Ninasam; M K Mutt; Radha Ramachandra; Sridhar; Priya Sudarshan
- Cinematography: Lavith
- Edited by: B. S. Kemparaj
- Music by: Score: Nobin Paul; Songs: Vasuki Vaibhav
- Production company: Kannada Kolour Cinemas
- Distributed by: N M Entertainment
- Release date: 21 October 2016
- Running time: 112 minutes
- Country: India
- Language: Kannada

Rama Rama Re... (Kannada: ರಾಮಾ ರಾಮಾ ರೇ...) is a 2016 Indian Kannada film written and directed by D. Satya Prakash. It tells the story of a convict on death row, who escapes from prison and accidentally ends up traveling with a retired veteran of a Police Department, who is called upon by the authorities to teach the process of executing a convict to the new staff. Rama Rama Re... was released on 21 October 2016. The film was remade in Telugu in 2018 as Aatagadharaa Siva by Rockline Venkatesh. The film is currently being remade in Marathi.

== Cast ==
- K. Jayaram as Ramanna
- Nataraj as Sandal Raja
- Dharmanna Kadur as Dharma
- Bhaskar dev as a Truck driver
- Bimbashri Ninasam as Subbi
- M. K. Mutt as Drunken bike rider
- Sridhar as Soldier
- Radha Ramachandra as Mother-in-law
- Priya as a Pregnant lady
- Prakash Chand as Ramanna's Dupe

== Production ==
=== Development ===
D. Satya Prakash, who had earlier directed a Kannada short film called Jayanagara 4th Block got the idea of this plot when he was very impressed with a story between life and death in the Bhagavad Gita. He, along with his close friends Nagendra H S and Dhananjay Ranjan, started working on the story-line and developed a story around it. However, the script was improvised until the end of the shooting schedule. Hence, Prakash said that the screenplay was never complete. For the character, Nataraj, the person playing the character of a convict who has escaped from the jail trying to escape from death had to do a lot of preparations to go deep into the character. It was not completely decided that the lead character would be played by Nataraj. However, he started preparing for the role by losing weight and looking like a person who has not seen a shelter in months. He worked rigorously for the role. He would wake up by 5 in the morning, run 5 km, eat some almonds, and no salt or spices or sweet was included in his meal. His meal included some vegetables and 2 chapatis every day. This was his routine for 6 months. For the character he reduced from 76 kilos to 52 kilos. Dharmanna Kadur and Bimbashree Neenasam who played the role of lovers were finalized for the other lead characters later. After this, the team started travelling to various locations in search of locations.

The actor K. Jayaram, who plays the role of Ramanna, the Executioner, died before the movie release. The opening credits of the movie also have a mention of him.

=== Filming ===
The team, which included the Director of Photography, the actors and the Director, travelled over 8000 kilometers searching for locations that were needed for the production. Finally, the team decided to shoot near Bijapur region and filmed the movie for 40 days. For the first song in the movie, there was a need to shoot various landscapes like mountains, valleys, grassland/meadows/fields, Forts, Waterfalls, and Beaches. The team traveled over 2,500 km for 20 days and has selected some of the best locations in Karnataka. Since the jeep is one of the important characters, the team purchased an old jeep and altered it as per the requirement. Art Director Varadraj Kamath designed the jeep to fit in all the necessary props and production items inside the Jeep. While 90% of the movie was shot on the road near a village near the town of Vijapura(Bijapur), the rest portion was shot in studios in Bangalore.

== Music ==
The original soundtrack and background score were composed by Nobin Paul & Songs were composed by Vasuki Vaibhav and all the lyrics have been penned by Satya Prakash. The soundtrack album was released on 2 September 2016.

Soundtrack
| No. | Title | Lyrics | Singer(s) | Length |
|---|---|---|---|---|
| 1. | "News Nodi" | D. Satya Prakash | Vasuki Vaibhav | 3:01 |
| 2. | "Baduke Baduke Kalisu" | D. Satya Prakash | Vasuki Vaibhav | 1:53 |
| 3. | "Rama Rama Re..." | D. Satya Prakash | Sangeeta Katti Kulkarni | 3:33 |
| 4. | "Namma Kaayo Devane" | D. Satya Prakash | Ananya Bhat | 1:43 |
| 5. | "Kelu Krishna" | D. Satya Prakash | B V Shrunga, Vasuki Vaibhav | 3:45 |
| Total length: | | | | 13:50 |

== Critical reception ==
Shashiprasad SM of Deccan Chronicle gave the film 4/5 stars, saying, "An ‘unmissable’ journey of life and death." He also said "Loved every bit of it. Undoubtedly the best feature film of the year."

Sunayana Suresh from The Times of India rated the movie as 4/5 mentioning that "The narrative is definitely the king here, complemented beautifully with a strong cast and crew."

Archana Nathan of The Hindu wrote, "Rama Rama Re unfolds like a song, one that will linger longer in your mind, much after you’ve left the theater." Nathan ranked the film second in a list of five best Kannada films.

== Accolades ==
2016 Bengaluru International Film Festival

- First Best Kannada Film

Karnataka State Film Awards

- Director's First Time Best Film — D. Satya Prakash

64th Filmfare Awards South

- Nominated, Best Film – Kannada
- Best Female Playback Singer – Kannada — Ananya Bhat ("Namma Kayo Devare")
