= Churikatte =

- Release poster
- Directed by: Raghu Shivamogga
- Written by: Raghu Shivamogga
- Produced by: M. Tulasiramudu; S. Nayazuddin
- Starring: Praveen Tej; Prerana Kambam; Achyuth Kumar; Sharath Lohitashwa; Balaji Manohar
- Cinematography: Advaitha Gurumurthy
- Music by: Nobin Paul
- Distributed by: KRG Studios
- Release date: 26 January 2018
- Country: India
- Language: Kannada

Churikatte is a 2018 Indian Kannada-language crime drama film directed by Raghu Shivamogga and starring Praveen Tej, Prerana Kambam, Achyuth Kumar, Sharath Lohitashwa and Balaji Manohar. The film takes place in a village named Churikatte in Malenadu and is about the timber mafia. The film is about how a stolen pistol affects the life of different people. Churikatte released to unanimous positive reviews.

== Cast ==
- Praveen Tej as Adi
- Prerana Kambam as Kala
- Achyuth Kumar as Ravikanth
- Sharath Lohitashwa as Anna
- Balaji Manohar as Seena
- Dattanna as Adi's grandfather
- Pramod Shetty as a member of the timber mafia gang
- Manjunath Hegde as a corrupt forest police officer
- Vivek Simha as Adi's friend

== Production ==
Raghu Shivamogga previously directed a television serial and a short film before this film. Praveen Tej sports two looks in the film: a clean shaven lean look and a bulky look with facial hair. Newcomer Prerana Kambam plays a sweet and innocent village girl.

== Reception ==
A. Sharadhaa of The New Indian Express wrote that "Overall, this crime thriller makes for a worthy piece of entertainment with convincing acting". Sunayana Suresh of The Times of India opined that "Watch Churikatte — it provides a good noir subject in Kannada after a while". A critic from Asianet stated that "This is a must-watch for the fans and non-fans of the genre alike".

== Accolades ==
Year	Award	Category	Nominee	Result	Ref.
2018	Karnataka State Film Awards	Best Supporting Actor	Balaji Manohar	Won	
