= K. S. Ashoka =

Indian film director

- Born: 19 March 1982 (age 44); Mandya, Karnataka, India
- Education: SJCE Mysuru, Karnataka.
- Occupations: Director, Screenwriter, Dialog writer
- Years active: 2013–present
- Spouse: Shruthi
- Children: 1

K. S. Ashoka known as Ashoka is an Indian director and writer. He became popular after his debut movie 6-5=2. It was the first found footage movie in Kannada. He directed a second movie, Dia, which was critically acclaimed and commercially successful.

== Early life ==
With an engineering degree from Sri Jayachamarajendra College of Engineering (SJCE) in Mysuru, Ashoka was working at Citibank India where he found his colleague D Krishna Chaitanya as his first movie producer. Following the success of 6-5=2 they again collaborated to work together for the next movie Dia.

== Filmography ==
Year	Film	Language	Note	Ref.
2013	6-5=2	Kannada	Debut film	
2020	Dia	Kannada		
2022	Dear Dia	Hindi	Remakes of Dia	
2023	Sari	Marathi	Remakes of Dia	

== Awards and nominations ==
Film	Award	Category	Result	Ref.
Dia	Chandanavana Film Critics Academy	Best Film	Won	
Dia	Chandanavana Film Critics Academy	Best Director	Nominated	
Dia	Chandanavana Film Critics Academy	Best Dialogue	Won	
Dia	Chandanavana Film Critics Academy	Best Screenplay	Nominated	
Dia	South Indian International Movie Awards	Best Director	Nominated	
