= Ashrita =

Ashrita is a given name. Notable people with the name include:

- Ashrita Furman (born 1954), Guinness World Records record-breaker
- Ashrita Shetty (born 1993), Indian actress
