= Ball Pen (film) =

- Theatrical release poster
- Directed by: Shashikanth
- Written by: K.C. Manjunath; Maasthi Upparahalli
- Screenplay by: Shashikanth
- Produced by: Bhavana Belagere; Srinagar Kitty
- Starring: Suchendra Prasad; Master Skanda; Master Shalom Raj; Master Samarth; Miss chetana
- Cinematography: C.J. Rajkumar
- Edited by: Shree (Crazy Minds)
- Music by: Manikanth Kadri
- Release date: 26 October 2012
- Country: India
- Language: Kannada

Ball Pen is a 2012 Indian Kannada-language film directed by Shashikanth. The film produced by Srinagar Kitty and Bhavana Belagere is a children's film which portrays the adventurous spirit, emotions in children and also focuses on child abuse.

== Cast ==
- Suchendra Prasad
- Master Skanda
- Master Shalom Raj
- Master Samarth
- Ila Veermalla
- Srinagar Kitty ... Cameo

== Reception ==
=== Critical response ===
A critic from The Times of India scored the film at 3 out of 5 stars and says "Skanda, Shalamraj and Samarth have done an excellent job. Suchendra Prasad is gracious. Manikan Kadri has melodious tunes for you. CT Rajkumar shines with his cinematography". A Sharadhaa from The New Indian Express wrote "Overall the film is a visual treat with good composition and camera movement. The Verdict: 'Ball Pen' is a film that should reach all age groups as it gives an insight into rural life". A critic from News18 India wrote "Dwarki and director Shashikanth have written meaningful lyrics for the songs. 'Ball Pen' is a well made film. It can be watched both for children and parents. Such films should be encouraged". B S Srivani from Deccan Herald wrote "The end may seem similar to other children’s films, but the sincerity of the children carries the day. ‘Ball Pen’ is not central to the story, or perhaps it was intended – to prod and nudge, if not shake, the powers-that-be".

== Soundtrack ==
Ball Pen

Soundtrack album to Ball Pen by Manikanth Kadri
- Released: 1 April 2012
- Genre: Feature Film soundtrack
- Language: Kannada
- Label: Bhavana Audio

Manikanth Kadri chronology
Crazy Loka (2012)	Ball Pen (2012)	Goondaism (2012)

The music of the film was composed by Manikanth Kadri. The first song of the film, Saavira Kiranava Chelli sung by Aditya Rao, was released on YouTube received a good response.

Tracklist

#	Title	Singer(s)	Length
1	"Saavira Kiranava Chelli"	Aditya Rao	2:26
2	"Idu Yaara Bhuvi"	Bhoomika	3:35
3	"Baleya Thotada Pakkada Kadali"	Samarth	4:15
4	"Tiliyo Manava"	Aditya Rao	1:52
