= Manimaran =

Indian film director

- Born: Manigandan; Tamil Nadu, India
- Occupation: Film director
- Years active: 2013–present

Manimaran is an Indian film director, working in the Tamil film industry.

== Career ==
He made his directorial debut in Tamil, Udhayam NH4 (2013) featuring Siddharth and a newcomer Ashrita Shetty in lead roles. It was simultaneously dubbed and released in Telugu in the same year. Udhayam NH4 was produced by Meeka Entertainment and Grass Root Film Company for which director Vetrimaaran penned the story. Manimaran was born and brought up in a town Walajapet near Vellore. Manimaran was one of a former associate of director Vetrimaaran and had worked in Vetrimaaran's films Polladhavan and Aadukalam. He collaborated once again with director Vetrimaran and actor Dhanush as a second unit direct in the 2019 film, Asuran. In 2021, he directed Sangathalaivan. The Samuthirakani-starrer wears its Communist shirt proudly but fails to sell its politics convincingly. Manimaran is far too abrasive in that he projects his protagonist as simply no more than the average Tamil film hero.

== Filmography ==
List of film credits
Year	Title	Director	Writer
2013	Udhayam NH4	Yes	Yes
2014	Poriyaalan	No	Yes
2016	Pugazh	Yes	Yes
2019	Asuran	No	Yes
2021	Sangathalaivan	Yes	Yes
2023	Viduthalai Part 1	No	Yes
2024	Viduthalai Part 2	No	Yes
