= Raavana Kottam =

2023 Indian political action drama film

- Theatricial release poster
- Directed by: Vikram Sugumaran
- Written by: Vikram Sugumaran
- Produced by: Kannan Ravi
- Starring: Shanthanu Bhagyaraj; Anandhi; Prabhu
- Cinematography: Vetrivel Mahendran
- Edited by: Lawrence Kishore
- Music by: Justin Prabhakaran
- Production company: Kannan Ravi Group
- Release date: 12 May 2023
- Country: India
- Language: Tamil

Raavana Kottam (transl. Ravana's gathering) is a 2023 Indian Tamil-language political action drama film written and directed by Vikram Sugumaran of Madha Yaanai Koottam fame and produced Kannan Ravi under the banner of Kannan Ravi Group. The film, Sugumaran's last film before his death and stars Shanthanu Bhagyaraj, Anandhi and Prabhu. The music was composed by Justin Prabhakaran.

Raavana Kottam was scheduled to release on 12 May 2023 and received mixed reviews from critics. The film was an average success at box office.

== Cast ==
- Shanthanu Bhagyaraj as Senguttuvan
- Anandhi as Indra Priyadarshini
- Prabhu as Chandrabose "Bose", Senguttuvan's father
- Ilavarasu as Chitravel, Madhivaanan's father
- Sanjay Saravanan as Madhivaanan
- Deepa Shankar as Senguttuvan's sister and Bose's daughter
- Sujatha
- Shaji Chen as Collector
- Aruldoss
- Rajapandi as Madhivaanan's Friend
- P. L. Thenappan
- Anandakudi Ilaiyaraaja

== Production ==
Director Lokesh Kanagaraj revealed the title look poster. Later the trailer was released by actor, Silambarasan

== Release ==
The film was released on 12 May 2023.

=== Home media ===
The post-theatrical streaming rights of the film were bought by Aha and Amazon Prime Video.The film had its digital premiere on the streaming platform from 16 June 2023.

== Controversy ==
Tamil Nadu Nadar Sangam president Muthu Ramesh has claimed that the release of the film Raavana Kottam should be banned as it is inciting caste riots in the southern districts. Therefore, he asked the Chief Minister of Tamil Nadu to ban the film and warned that they would block the theatres and stage a protest if the film was screened in theatres.

== Reception ==
=== Critical response ===
Raavana Kottam received mixed reviews from critics.

Logesh Balachandran of The Times of India gave 2.5 stars out of 5 and stated that the film "mounts itself on a narrative that's not impactful enough." An ABP News critic wrote that the first half "is moving with love scenes that have soured after watching Tamil cinema". Navein Darshan critic of Cinema Express gave 2 stars out of 5 and noted that "He takes a moment to process this and breaks into a loud roar out of disappointment" Gopinath Rajendran critic of The Hindu wrote "Raavana Kottam is a middling attempt that despite sporting a brilliant cast, comes short of what it could’ve potentially been because of a shallow plot and dismal writing. Shanthnu deserved more and so did we."
