= Viduthalai Part 1 =

2023 Indian film by Vetrimaaran

- Theatrical release poster
- Directed by: Vetrimaaran
- Written by: Vetrimaaran; R. S. Durai Senthilkumar; Mathimaran Pugazhendhi; Vikram Sugumaran; Tamizh
- Screenplay by: Vetrimaaran; Manimaran
- Produced by: Elred Kumar
- Starring: Soori; Vijay Sethupathi; Bhavani Sre; Gautham Vasudev Menon
- Cinematography: R. Velraj
- Edited by: R. Ramar
- Music by: Ilaiyaraaja
- Production companies: RS Infotainment; Grass Root Film Company
- Distributed by: Red Giant Movies
- Release date: 31 March 2023
- Running time: 150 minutes
- Country: India
- Language: Tamil
- Budget: est. ₹40 crore
- Box office: est. ₹40–60 crore

Viduthalai Part 1 (transl. Liberation Part 1) is a 2023 Indian Tamil-language political crime thriller film directed and co-produced by Vetrimaaran under Grass Root Film Company and RS Infotainment. Set in 1987, the film follows a police constable, who is recruited to arrest the leader of a separatist group but soon gets caught in ethical dilemmas. The ensemble cast includes Soori, Vijay Sethupathi, Bhavani Sre, Gautham Vasudev Menon, Rajiv Menon, Ilavarasu, Balaji Sakthivel, Saravana Subbiah, Chetan, Munnar Ramesh, and Pavel Navageethan.

Viduthalai was originally announced as a single film in April 2021, with principal photography already having commenced in December 2020. However, it was later announced to be split into two parts. It was predominantly shot in Chengalpattu, with the first part's portions wrapping by late December 2022. The music was composed by Ilaiyaraaja, cinematography handled by R. Velraj and editing by R. Ramar.

Viduthalai Part 1 was released in theatres on 31 March 2023. The film received critical acclaim and became a box-office success. Viduthalai Part 2, the sequel, was released in 2024.

== Plot ==
In 1987, a derailment in rural Tamil Nadu leaves numerous passengers dead or injured. Authorities blame the incident on Makkal Padai (People's Army), an armed extremist group protesting a government-backed mining project in their hilltop village. In response, the state launches Operation Ghost Hunt to capture the group's elusive leader, "Vaathiyar" Perumal.

Kumaresan, a newly recruited police constable, joins the E-Company police unit as a driver. Possessing an empathetic nature, Kumaresan struggles with strict bureaucracy, substandard operational conditions, and the harsh directives enforced by his egocentric superior, Officer-in-Charge Ragavendar. He falls in love with Tamilarasi "Pappa", the granddaughter of a village woman whom Kumaresan previously admitted into an hospital following a bear attack. Following the murder of a policeman named Raghu, the government appoints DSP Sunil Menon to oversee the operation.

Sunil initiates a strategy to turn the villagers against Perumal. Following the cruel interrogation of a Makkal Padai member, Sunil has a facial composite of Perumal constructed, leading Kumaresan to realize that he had unwittingly aided Perumal and his men during routine patrol duties. Kumaresan shares this realization with Head Constable Chandran, unaware that Chandran is a mole for Makkal Padai. Chandran alerts a group of people from Makkal Padai, leading to an ambush intended for Kumaresan that appears to target Sunil instead. With Kumaresan's assistance, Sunil escapes unharmed. Pappa subsequently informs Kumaresan that Perumal specifically targets officers engaging in police brutality, revealing that he murdered policemen who directly caused her father's death and gang-raped her mother.

During the inauguration of the mining project, Makkal Padai attacks, and an accidental bomb blast kills four presiding officers. Enraged, Sunil orders the mass arrest of local villagers suspected of harbouring familial ties to the group. During a custodial interrogation, Pappa's grandmother dies from torture. Days later, E-Company detains and tortures Pappa alongside other villagers under the suspicion that a close relative of the group's key member is among them.

Desperate to secure Pappa's release, Kumaresan approaches Sunil and discloses Perumal's suspected hideout. Kumaresan is deployed alongside a squad to conduct a prompt raid on the location. While Pappa admits to being the relative E-Company is searching for to ensure the safety of fellow villagers and is taken away, Kumaresan successfully apprehends Perumal following a heavy firefight.

== Cast ==
- Soori as Constable Kumaresan (#1563)
- Vijay Sethupathi as Perumal "Vaathiyaar", the leader of Makkal Padai
- Bhavani Sre as Tamilarasi alias Pappa, Kumaresan's love interest
- Gautham Vasudev Menon as DSP Sunil Menon, Head of Operation Ghosthunt
- Rajiv Menon as A. Subramaniyan, Chief Secretary of Tamil Nadu
- Ilavarasu as Ila. Ilavarasu, Tamil Nadu's Minister of Public Works
- Balaji Sakthivel as a villager
- Saravana Subbiah as Collector of Arumapuri District
- Tamizh as SI Amudan
- Chetan as V. Ragavendar, Officer-in-Charge (OC) of E-Company
- Aryan as Constable Aari
- Munnar Ramesh as SI "Chow Chow" Ramasamy
- Pavel Navageethan as a photographer at the train derailment
- Sardar Sathya as Sub-Inspector Velmurugan
- Manimegalai as Tamilarasi's paternal grandmother ("Appathaa")
- Bala Hasan as a Constable
- S. Chandran as Head Constable Chandran
- Asuran Krishna
- Sundareswaran CVC as T.A., the second-in-command to Perumal
- R. Ganesh Gurung as Natarajan, SP for Arumapuri District

== Production ==
=== Development ===
After wrapping work on Asuran in mid-2019, it was reported that director Vetrimaaran was in talks with Soori as the lead for his next directorial venture. Elred Kumar would reportedly be project under the banner RS Infotainment. The production was reported to begin after the director completed the post-production for Asuran. The following October, Vetrimaaran confirmed that he would direct Soori's debut as a lead. The company made a public announcement a few days later, and it was tentatively titled Production No. 15. However, due to the COVID-19 pandemic, the commencement of production was postponed.

To reduce production costs, the makers reportedly began filming the portions with an IPhone, which was never done before in Tamil cinema. The film's official title Viduthalai was announced on 21 April 2021. Originally intended to be a single film, it was later split into two parts. Cinematography was handled by R. Velraj, editing by R. Ramar, and action choreography by Peter Hein. While Vetrimaaran initially claimed he was inspired by B. Jeyamohan's short story Thunaivan, commentators noted that the film was closer to Solakar Thoddy (2013) by S. Balamurugan. In the opening credits, Vetrimaaran attributes the "basic idea" to the novel Vengaichami by Thangam, and adds that the film is based on an undisclosed short story by Jeyamohan.

=== Casting and filming ===
Soori worked with Vetrimaaran from the inception of the project, and Viduthalai Part 1 became his first film in a leading role. He said Vijay Sethupathi earlier advised him to explore all kinds of roles and not restrict himself to the comedic roles he was primarily known for. Sethupathi eventually joined the cast, with his character based on Kaliyaperumal Vaathiyaar, a member of the Tamil Desiyam Group who operated in the 1980s. In January 2021, Bhavani Sre, sister of composer G. V. Prakash Kumar, was announced to be playing the female lead, in her third feature film after Ka Pae Ranasingam and Paava Kadhaigal (both 2020). In April 2021, Gautham Vasudev Menon was reported to play the role of a police officer.

The filmmakers moved to Sathyamangalam forest to prepare to shoot major sequences featuring Soori during December 2020. The shooting of the film took place in Sathyamangalam for three months, and the filmmakers moved to Chengalpattu in April 2021, in which the filmmakers erected a police camp set, and shot there for 20 days. The opening sequence depicting a train accident was an 8-minute long take, and was shot on a set erected near Vandalur. The filmmakers later planned to shoot the last leg of the film at Sathyamangalam after the COVID-19 lockdown restrictions there ended. Principal photography wrapped by 31 December 2022.

== Music ==
Viduthalai Part 1

Soundtrack album by Ilaiyaraaja
- Released: 8 March 2023
- Recorded: 2022–2023
- Genre: Feature film soundtrack
- Length: 13:51
- Language: Tamil
- Label: Sony Music South

Ilaiyaraaja chronology
Ranga Maarthaanda (2023)	Viduthalai Part 1 (2023)	Tamilarasan (2023)
External audio
- Viduthalai Part 1 – Jukebox on YouTube

Singles from Vidhuthalai Part 1
- 1. "Onnoda Nadandhaa" Released: 8 February 2023

The film's soundtrack is composed by Ilaiyaraaja in his maiden collaboration with Vetrimaaran. Ilaiyaraaja composed the song of the film in his newly launched music studio in Kodambakkam, after his falling-out with Prasad Studios, where he recorded songs for nearly four decades. Music composition of the film began in February 2021. The music rights were purchased by Sony Music India. The first single titled "Onnoda Nadandhaa" released on 8 February 2023.

Track listing
No.	Title	Lyrics	Singer(s)	Length
1.	"Onnoda Nadandhaa"	Suka	Dhanush, Ananya Bhat	5:11
2.	"Kaattumalli"	Ilaiyaraaja	Ilaiyaraaja, Ananya Bhat	5:07
3.	"Arutperunjodhi"	Vallalar, Thangam	Ilaiyaraaja	3:33
Total length:				13:51

== Release ==
The distribution rights for Tamil Nadu were acquired by Red Giant Movies. The overseas distribution rights for UK and Europe were acquired by Ahimsa Entertainment. The film released theatrically on 31 March 2023. It was later screened at the 54th International Film Festival of India.

=== Home media ===
The film began streaming on ZEE5 from 28 April 2023. and also streaming at Amazon Prime Video on 19 January 2025 coinciding with the digital release of the sequel.

== Reception ==
=== Critical response ===
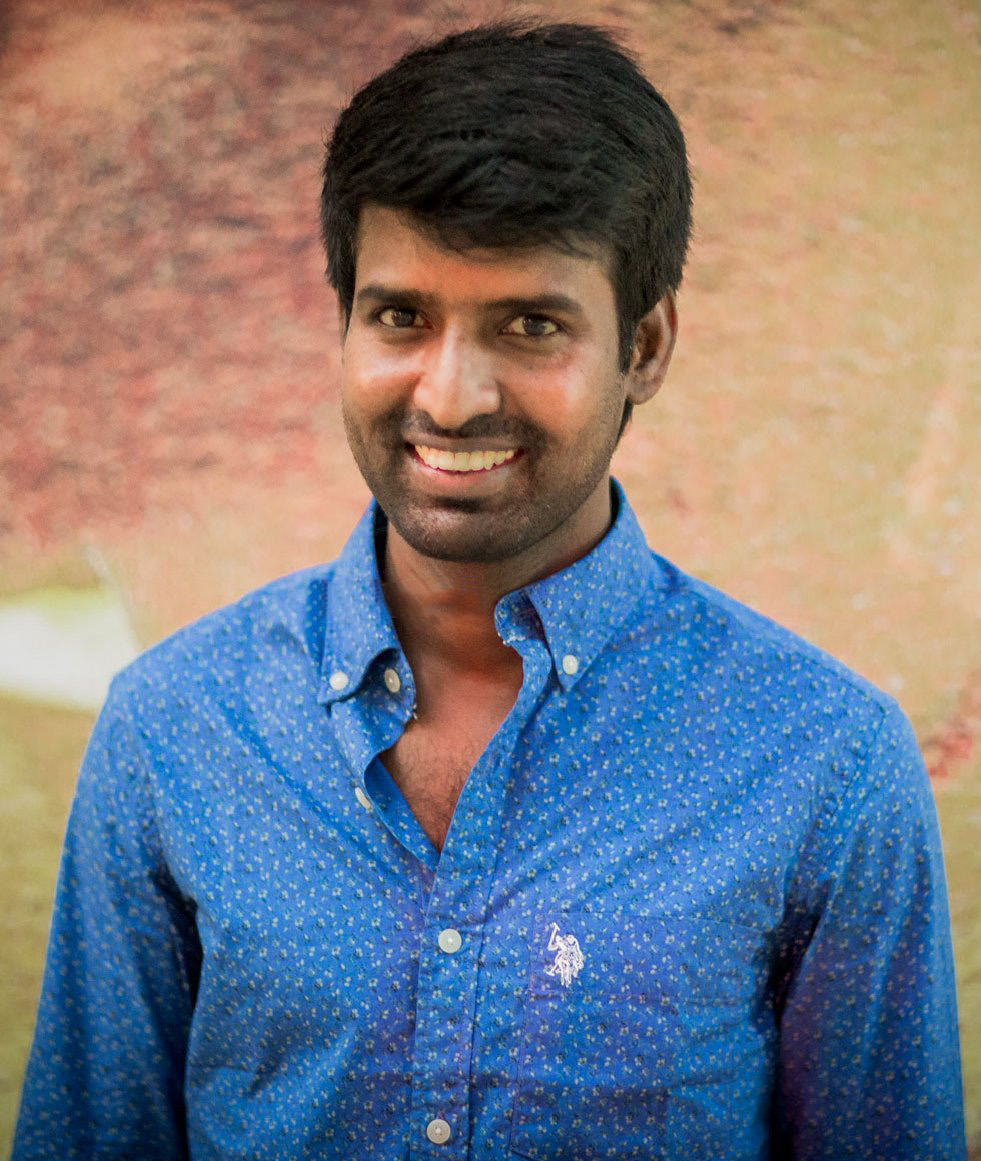
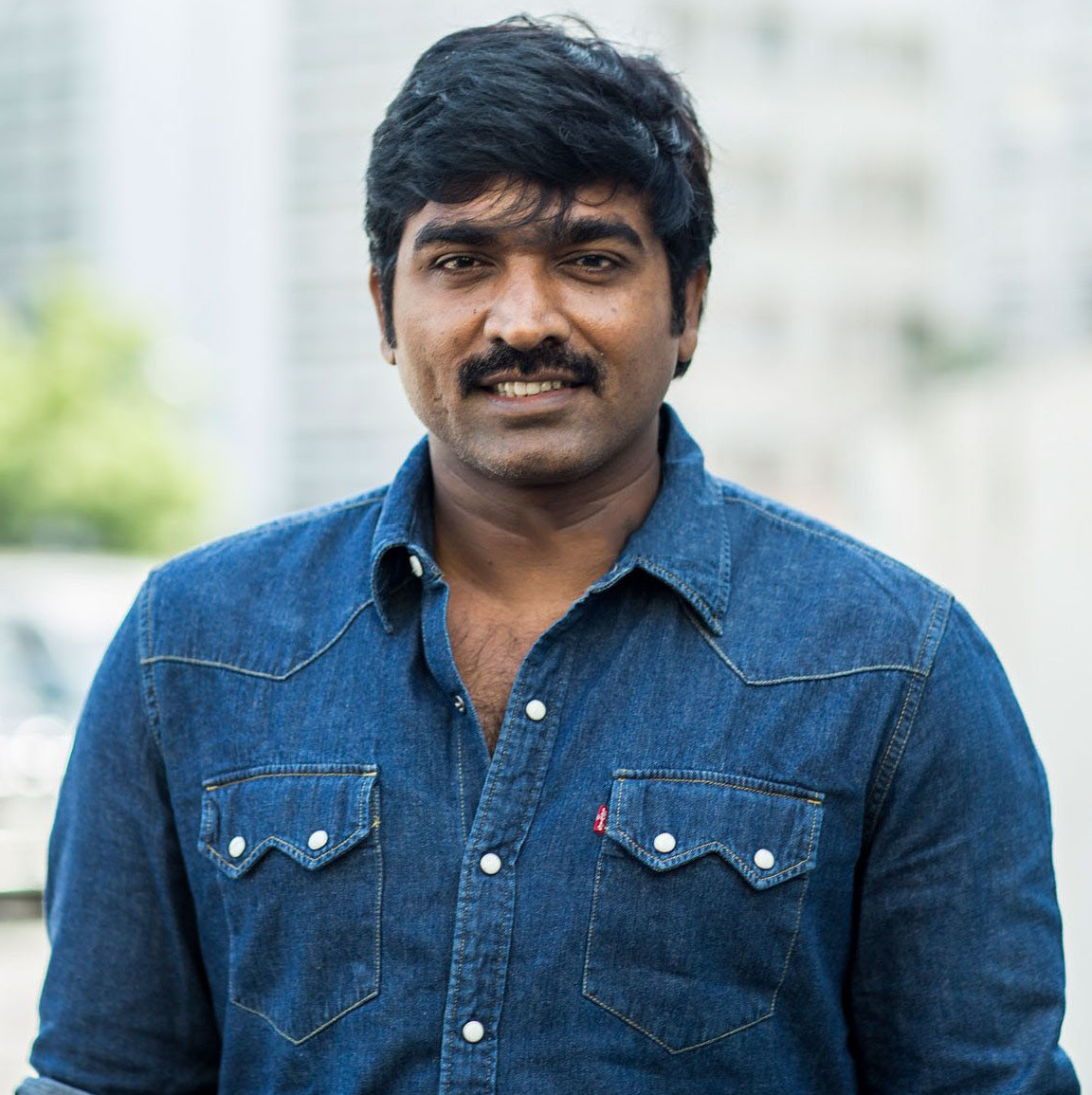
Critics praised the performances of Soori (left) and Vijay Sethupathi.

Viduthalai Part 1 received positive reviews from critics. On the review aggregator website Rotten Tomatoes, 100% of 6 critics' reviews are positive, with an average rating of 7.5/10.

Logesh Balachandran of The Times of India gave 4/5 stars and wrote "Viduthalai Part 1 maintains a consistent pace and keeps viewers engaged with moments of high tension. It stays true to Vetri Maaran's style and artistry, making audiences eager for the sequel." P. Sangeetha of OTTPlay gave 4/5 and wrote "Viduthalai scores on all corners, be it the plot, narration, background score, acting performances, cinematography and not to forget, the filmmaking. A brilliant film from the Vetri Maaran stable!" Sarath Ramesh Kuniyl of The Week gave 4/5 stars and wrote "Viduthalai is a multi-layered film, held together by a gripping narrative."

Latha Srinivasan of India Today gave 3.5/5 stars and wrote "Viduthalai (Freedom) is a film that is a must-watch because it offers a new cinematic perspective of Vetrimaaran and especially because Soori is outstanding." Kirubhakar Purushothaman of The Indian Express gave 3.5/5 stars and wrote "Vetrimaaran is back with another film about police brutality that is heart-wrenching and might be a hard watch if you prefer your safety zone." Bharathy Singaravel of The News Minute gave 3.5/5 stars and wrote "Soori is masterful in Vetrimaaran's gritty political spectacle."

Haricharan Pudipeddi of Hindustan Times wrote "Viduthalai: Part 1, which is definitely not for the faint-hearted, is an elaborate, detailed exploration of the abuse of power." Gopinath Rajendran of The Hindu wrote "Viduthalai: Part 1 ends at a crucial juncture and the ending makes it evident that exponentially more incidents are bound to happen in the sequel; Vetri Maaran leaves us on the edge of our seats." Vishal Menon of Film Companion wrote "Viduthalai remains the rare instance in a Vetri Maaran movie where you do not have to take a disciplined, conscious effort to wash away the chilling imagery. It’s still a powerful film but it’s arguably the only time a film of his did not feel like a punch to your gut."

=== Box office ===
Viduthalai Part 1 grossed ₹4.8 crore on its release day, and ₹28 crore worldwide in four days. It concluded its run with worldwide gross estimated to be ₹40–60 crore.

== Accolades ==
Award (Note: Awards, festivals and organisations are in alphabetical order.)	Date of ceremony (Note: Date is linked to the article about the awards held that year, wherever possible.)	Category	Recipient(s)	Result	Ref.
69th Filmfare Awards South	3 August 2024	Critics Best Film — Tamil (Director)	Vetrimaaran	Won	
69th Filmfare Awards South	3 August 2024	Best Film – Tamil	Viduthalai Part 1	Nominated	
69th Filmfare Awards South	3 August 2024	Best Director – Tamil	Vetrimaaran	Nominated	
69th Filmfare Awards South	3 August 2024	Best Actor – Tamil	Soori	Nominated	
69th Filmfare Awards South	3 August 2024	Best Actress – Tamil	Bhavani Sre	Nominated	
69th Filmfare Awards South	3 August 2024	Best Music Director – Tamil	Ilaiyaraaja	Nominated	
69th Filmfare Awards South	3 August 2024	Best Lyricist – Tamil	Suka for "Onnoda Nadandhaa"	Nominated	

== Sequel ==
The sequel Viduthalai Part 2 was released on 20 December 2024.
