= Udhayam NH4 =

2013 Indian film by Manimaran

- Directed by: Manimaran
- Written by: Vetrimaaran (dialogue)
- Screenplay by: Vetrimaaran; Manimaran
- Story by: Vetrimaaran
- Produced by: Dayanidhi Azhagiri; Vetrimaaran (creative producer)
- Starring: Siddharth; Ashrita Shetty; Kay Kay Menon
- Cinematography: Velraj
- Edited by: Kishore Te.
- Music by: G. V. Prakash Kumar
- Production companies: Meeka Entertainment; Grass Root Film Company
- Distributed by: Red Giant Movies
- Release date: 19 April 2013
- Running time: 123 minutes
- Country: India
- Language: Tamil
- Budget: ₹80 million (US$830,000)

Udhayam NH4 is a 2013 Indian Tamil-language action thriller film directed by debutant Manimaran, a former associate of Vetrimaaran. The film stars Siddharth and newcomer Ashrita Shetty. Vetrimaaran wrote the script, did the screenplay, and penned the dialogues for this film. The story takes place in Bangalore, Karnataka. The film's soundtrack and background score were composed by G. V. Prakash Kumar. The film released along with a dubbed Telugu version titled NH4 on 19 April 2013.

== Plot ==
Prabhu falls in love with Rithika, his classmate, who reciprocates his feelings, but are separated after Rithika's father disapproves of their relationship. Prabhu, lovelorn, discusses the route from Bangalore to Chennai with his friends and plan to kidnap Rithika to elope. Meanwhile, Rithika's father, Avinash Patel, appoints encounter specialist ACP Manoj Menon IPS, who questions Rithika's male friend Deepak about Prabhu. Deepak claims that Prabhu is a drug addict and was always trying to woo Rithika, who started to avoid him because of Prabhu. After that, the plot continues when Manoj tries to track Prabhu and his friends. In the attempt, they track down a message from another friend named Umesh, asking Prabhu and friends to come to Bangarpet bus stand, only to find Manoj and his team arresting the guy for more information. Manoj goes to a railway station where the train in which Prabhu and Rithika are travelling to Chennai via Kuppam, Andhra Pradesh. He finds Rithika and forcefully drags her into his jeep.

As the flashback winds again (this time by Rithika), she fell for Prabhu after seeing him on many instances showing his presence of mind. As the flashback ends, Manoj finds Prabhu on the highway, where he does not stop until he runs over pieces of glass put down by Prabhu. They get into a brawl where Prabhu loses, and Manoj continues in the highway but has to stop in a railway signal at Andhra Pradesh-Karnataka border. Prabhu takes his chance and threatens Manoj, keeping his throat under a blade and taking Rithika with him. After a cat and mouse chase, Manoj calls Prabhu, saying that his friend needs immediate treatment after an accident. He goes in search of Manoj and involves in a fight with him again. Now, after the stroke of midnight, Rithika turns 18, giving her the right for choosing her partner. After that, Manoj leaves the highway, as he could not do anymore, according to the law.

== Cast ==
- Siddharth as Prabhu
- Ashrita Shetty as Rithika
- Kay Kay Menon as Manoj Menon IPS, Assistant Commissioner of Police
- Avinash as Avinash Patel, Rithika's father
- Aadukalam Naren as Prabhu's brother-in-law
- Surekha Vani as Prabhu's sister
- Kaali Venkat as Constable Anbu
- Karthik Sabesh as Karthik
- Deepak as Deepak
- Achyuth Kumar as Politician
- Yash Bhothra as Umesh
- Ajay as Ajay
- Rohit Balaiah
- P. Kalaivanan
- Gaana Bala in a special appearance
- Deepa Venkat as Manoj Menon's wife (voice only)

== Production ==
While working with Balu Mahendra for Adhu Oru Kana Kaalam (2005), producer Vetrimaaran prepared a script for Dhanush, who was the lead hero of the film he worked on, and Dhanush immediately accepted the offer after hearing the story. The film titled was Desiya Nedunchalai 47 was initially launched with Yuvan Shankar Raja as the music director and Ekambaram as the cinematographer. However, he found trouble finding producers with A. M. Rathnam and Salem Chandrasekhar leaving the project after initial interest, Dhanush's sister Dr. Vimala Geetha agreed to produce the film, but she also dropped the film. Dhanush's father Kasthuri Raja finally agreed to produce the film, and Kirat Bhattal was signed as heroine, while Harris Jayaraj was selected as music director. However, after two days of shoot, the film was shelved, and Dhanush opted to pursue other films after the surprise success of his Thiruvilayadal Arambam (2006). The film's collapse saw Vetrimaaran approach producer Kadiresan and narrated to him the stories he had prepared, but the producer did not like Desiya Nedunchaalai 47, but later agreed to work on another project titled Polladhavan.

Vetrimaaran restarted the film as a creative producer with Dayanidhi Azhagiri, and chose to give the script to debutant director Manimaaran, who was initially nervous to take over a script by a National film winner. The team tried to re-take the title Desiya Nedunchalai, but this name was already registered by Dr. Srinivasan, which hence led to the renaming of the title to Udhayam NH4. Cloud Nine Movies approached Siddharth for the lead role, who immediately accepted it. Kishore, who was initially approached for a role in 2006, was re-approached but was unable to commit dates for the film. Subsequently Kay Kay Menon, who Vetrimaaran had been discussing a role in his next film Vada Chennai with, was signed on to play a pivotal role in the film. Debut actress Ashrita Shetty was selected to play the lead female role. Ramya was signed to appear in a cameo appearance in the film but eventually did not feature. Newbies Ajai, Kalai and Karthi play Siddharth's friends. Velraj is the cinematographer, music by G. V. Prakash Kumar editing will be by Kishore Te. The film was produced jointly by Dayanidhi Azhagiri and Vetrimaaran as a tie-up between their companies Meeka Entertainment and Grass Root Film Company. The filming took place only on real locations, where crowds delayed shootings up to four days, making hidden cameras mandatory.

== Soundtrack ==
Udhayam NH4

Soundtrack album by G. V. Prakash Kumar
- Released: 15 March 2013
- Recorded: 2013
- Genre: Feature film soundtrack
- Language: Tamil
- Label: Sony Music

G. V. Prakash Kumar chronology
Annakodi (2013)	Udhayam NH4 (2013)	Thalaivaa (2013)

The soundtrack album was composed by G. V. Prakash Kumar. The music rights were acquired by Sony Music India. On 14 February 2013 Valentine's Day, the track "Yaaro Ivan" was unveiled at Suryan FM.

Track listing
No.	Title	Lyrics	Singer(s)	Length
1.	"Yaaro Ivan"	Na. Muthukumar	G. V. Prakash Kumar & Saindhavi	04:41
2.	"Maalai Pon Maalai"	La. Rajkumar	Bela Shende & S. P. B. Charan	05:22
3.	"Ora Kannala"	Gaana Bala	Gaana Bala	04:47
4.	"Indrodu Thadaigal"	Vaali	Srinivas & Ramya NSK	03:57
5.	"Vaa Iravugal"	Kabilan Vairamuthu	Ajmal Khan, Amrith Vishwanath	05:30
Total length:				18:47

== Release ==
On 14 February 2013, the first film trailer was released at Sun Music. Udhayam NH4 released in around 250 theatres across Tamil Nadu.

== Reception ==
Baradwaj Rangan of The Hindu thanked the film crew for a well treated, but slight story, "[...] the constant infusion of colour keeps us hooked. I don’t think I’ve laughed so much at a cop telling his nagging wife he loves her." Behindwoods gave 3 of 5 stars and concluded, "To sum it all, Udhayam NH 4 comes across as a well packaged product that has many things going in its favor and is sure to have patrons from the youth along with other sections of the audience too." Sify recommended the film, "The presentation is unique as it doesn’t have the trappings of usual masala potboilers." in.com rated the film 3.5 out of 5 and stated that the story is simple but the taut screenplay with unexpected twists and turns at the right time makes Udhayam a good watch. Mahalakshmi Prabhakaran of Daily News and Analysis criticized the performance of Ashrita Shetty heavily, "As the character who’s the prize catch for both the cop and the boyfriend, the role’s every debutante actress' dream. But Hrishita just doesn’t match up. We are not even going to comment on her poor delivery of Tamil. Yes, she might be a Kannadiga in the movie, but that’s no excuse!", giving the film an average rating of 3. S. Saarawathi of Rediff wrote, "Udhayam NH4 is a racy entertainer that keeps you glued to the screen." Sidharth Varma of The Times of India rated it 3.5 out of 5 stars and said, "The movie brings in a whiff of fresh air in the dialogue department. The characters switch between the four south Indian languages and English depending on the place where the scene is set and the situation, which adds to the authenticity of the movie. The drama is injected in the right doses through the incidents on the highway, and flashbacks tell us more about each character." Sangeetha Devi Dundoo of The Hindu recommended the film, "Take a ride down this highway just to see how a talented director can make a simple story engaging." Review Raja found the film to be "just an alright movie", and thought, that Ashrita Shetty wasn't capable enough to play the female lead role. Bangalore Mirror gave the film 3.5 out of 5 saying that the film is well crafted.
