= Aadhav Kannadasan =

Indian actor

- Born: Chennai
- Occupations: Actor; Assistant director
- Years active: 2013–present

Aadhav Kannadasan is an Indian actor who works predominantly in Tamil-language films.

== Career ==
Aadhav Kannadasan began his career in the film industry by working as an assistant director in G. N. R. Kumaravelan's team during the making of Yuvan Yuvathi (2011). Notably, Aadhav's father Kalaivanan Kannadasan had earlier apprenticed under Kumaravelan's father G. N. Rangarajan, hence he was keen to follow the same pattern. In late 2010, he agreed terms to make his acting debut in A. C. Durai's Ponmaalai Pozhudhu, and took up acting lessons with Koothu-P-Pattarai, as well as stunt and dance classes to prepare for the role. Aadhav had been 86 kilograms, and had to shed 12 kilograms for the role. Aadhav spent time with the four school children in the film to imbibe their body language and to learn how to portray a school kid. The film remained stuck for a number of years, before it was eventually released in August 2013. Ponmaalai Pozhudhu opened to mixed reviews.

In 2014, he appeared in the horror drama Yaamirukka Bayamey, which performed well at the box office, and subsequently reprised his role in the Kannada remake, Namo Bhootatma (2014). He also produced a Tamil short film Oliyum Oliyum which was selected in the Chicago South Asian Film Festival (CSAFF). In 2016, Aadhav worked simultaneously on two projects, Pagal by Ezhil Bharathi and Vadaname Chandra Bimbamo by Srinivas, but both films remain unreleased. On the slow start to his acting career, Aadhav noted that he was poor at networking and apprehensive about approaching production houses for opportunities.

He made his web series debut through the ZEE5 original High Priestess (2019), working alongside Amala Akkineni and Varalaxmi Sarathkumar. Aadhav then portrayed a supporting role in the crime thriller Kaalidas (2019), appearing as a mysterious tenant. In 2020, he notably directed on a short film titled Lockdown featuring Andrea Jeremiah. He will also be seen in a feature film alongside actress Vani Bhojan.

== Personal life ==
His grandfather is the renowned poet Kannadasan, while his father Kalaivanan Kannadasan, also worked in the film industry as a director.

In December 2017, Aadhav married Vinodhnie Suresh in a ceremony held in Chennai.

== Filmography ==
=== Films ===
Key
†	Denotes films that have not yet been released

Year	Film	Role	Notes
2013	Ponmaalai Pozhudhu	Arjun	
2014	Yaamirukka Bayamey	Thamizh	
2014	Namo Bhootatma		Kannada film
2016	Oliyum Oliyum	—N/a	Short film; as producer and writer
2019	Kaalidas	Tenant	
2022	Anel Meley Pani Thuli	Saran	
2023	Karungaapiyam	Arunachalam	
TBA	Thazh Thiravaa	TBA	Completed

=== Web series ===
Year	Film	Role	Language	Notes
2019	High Priestess	Vikram	Telugu	ZEE5 original

=== Lyricist ===
List of Aadhav Kannadasan lyricist credits
Year	Song	Composer	Singer(s)	Ref.
2017	"Friendship Anthem"	Praveen PDM, Rahul Mani	Premgi Amaren, MC Rude, Praveen PDM, Rahul Mani, Danny, Abhinay Vaddi, Nikil Murugan	
