= High Priestess (TV series) =

Indian web series

- Official poster
- Genre: Mystery; Thriller
- Created by: Pushpa Ignatius
- Screenplay by: Pushpa Ignatius; Shashank Srivastav(Dialogues)
- Directed by: Pushpa Ignatius
- Starring: Amala Akkineni; Kishore Kumar; Bhavani Sre; Aadhav Kannadasan
- Composer: Gopal Rao Paranandi
- Country of origin: India
- Original language: Telugu
- No. of seasons: 1
- No. of episodes: 8

Production
- Executive producer: Ram Ganesan
- Producers: Krishna Kulasekaran; Shanmugharaja. H
- Production location: India
- Cinematography: Soundararajan
- Editor: Richard Kevin. A
- Production company: Tribal Horse Entertainment

Original release
- Network: Zee5
- Release: 25 April 2019

High Priestess is an Indian Telugu-language thriller web series that premiered on ZEE5 on 25 April 2019. It is directed by Pushpa Ignatius and stars Amala Akkineni and Kishore Kumar with Bhavani Sre and Aadhav Kannadasan.

== Promotion ==
The series was announced with six other Telugu ZEE5 Originals in November 2018 which also marks debut of Amala Akkineni into web series. On 5 April 2019, the first look of Amala was released on Social media. Following the first look, trailer was released the following week and garnered good response.

== Plot ==
The series around Swathi Reddy, a renowned Tarot reader who experiences the pasts of her clients. There are total of seven stories which are spread across eight episodes. During these stories the past of Swathi is revealed.

== Cast ==
- Amala Akkineni as Swathi Reddy, a Tarot reader
  - Bhavani Sre as young Swathi Reddy
- Kishore Kumar as Vikram, Swathi's friend
  - Aadhav Kannadasan as young Vikram
- Monisha Duraibabu as Sneha Reddy, Swathi's daughter

=== Guests ===
- Vijayalakshmi as Pooja
- Nandini Rai as Ruby
- Brahmaji as Lawyer
- Sunaina as Radhika
- Varalaxmi Sarathkumar as Vaishnavi
- Siddhartha Shankar as Ruby's husband
- Baby Dakshana as Ruby's daughter Neha

== Episodes ==
No.	Title	Directed by	Written by	Original release date
1	"Maya"	Pushpa Ignatius	Pushpa (Screenplay) and Shashank (Dialogues)	April 25, 2019
Swathi founds herself in midst of a missing person's case. Her capabilities are revealed.
2	"Ruby"	Pushpa Ignatius	Pushpa (Screenplay) and Shashank (Dialogues)	April 25, 2019
Swathi surprises after seeing her old college friend, Vikram and starts narrating the story of Ruby an air hostess who lost her beauty charm after marriage.
3	"Vanity"	Pushpa Ignatius	Pushpa (Screenplay) and Shashank (Dialogues)	April 25, 2019
Ruby unleashes an ancient demon in the search of eternal beauty. She comes to Swathi Reddy begging for help which may lead to exorcism.
4	"12:15"	Pushpa Ignatius	Pushpa (Screenplay) and Shashank (Dialogues)	April 25, 2019
Swathi and Vikram goes through their old memories. She starts talking about her first case in which Siddharth was haunted by numbers and how she solved it.
5	"Vengeance"	Pushpa Ignatius	Pushpa (Screenplay) and Shashank (Dialogues)	April 25, 2019
Swathi and Vikram talk about their short-lived relationship. As Swathi reached for something a coconut falls out. Vikram was curious to know about it. Swathi starts narrating a lawyer's story which seems funny at the start but takes an interesting twist.
6	"Innocence"	Pushpa Ignatius	Pushpa (Screenplay) and Shashank (Dialogues)	April 25, 2019
This a tale of a suburban couple Ram, Vaishnavi and their kid Abhinav moves into a house that has a tinge of paranormal history and the events drags Swathi into this ordeal.
7	"Friends"	Pushpa Ignatius	Pushpa (Screenplay) and Shashank (Dialogues)	April 25, 2019
Swathi and Vikram grow closer when Krishna arrives at their doorstep. A new tale about Radhika, Varun and Krishna and their friendship start.
8	"Into the light"	Pushpa Ignatius	Pushpa (Screenplay) and Shashank (Dialogues)	April 25, 2019
Radhika's spirit continues to appear for Krishna. Swathi helps Krishna and get Vikram to speak about their relationship openly.
