= Jabardasth Shankara =

- Theatrical release poster
- Directed by: Devadas Kapikad
- Story by: Devadas Kapikad
- Produced by: Lokesh Kotian; Anil Kumar
- Starring: Arjun Kapikad; Neetha Ashok; Rashi B Saikrishna
- Cinematography: Uday Ballal; Siddu G. S.
- Edited by: Sujith Nayak
- Music by: Manikanth Kadri
- Release date: 8 November 2019
- Country: India
- Language: Tulu

Jabardasth Shankara is a 2019 Indian Tulu-language film directed by Devadas Kapikad and starring Arjun Kapikad in dual roles, Neetha Ashok and Rashi B Saikrishna.

== Cast ==
- Arjun Kapikad as Shankara
- Neetha Ashok as Lavanya
- Rashi B Saikrishna
- Sathish Bandale
- Gopinath Bhat
- Girish M Shetty Kateel
- Laxman Kumar Mallur
- Prathik Shetty
- Sunil Nelligudde
- Sharan Kaikamba
- Thimmappa Kulal

== Production ==
The muhurat of the film was held in early 2019. The post-production of the film was complete in April 2019 with plans to dub the film in other languages.

== Soundtrack ==
All music is composed by Manikanth Kadri.

Track listing
| No. | Title | Lyrics | Singer(s) | Length |
|---|---|---|---|---|
| 1. | "Yera Ullerge" | | | 3:48 |
| 2. | "Shankara Shiva" | Devadas Kapikad | Devadas Kapikad | 4:27 |
| 3. | "Kande Baye Promotional Song" | Arjun Kapikad | Arjun Kapikad | 1:54 |
| 4. | "Alen Thule" | Devadas Kapikad | Manikanth Kadri, Supriya Lohith | 4:34 |
| Total length: | | | | 14:43 |

== Release ==
The film was released on 8 November 2019 in India and the Middle East.

== Reception ==
A critic from Mangalore Today wrote, "‘Jabardasth Shankara’ is an eminently watchable Tulu drama film. Departing from Tulu stereotype of overdose of comedy, this Jalanidhi production carries you through its 127 minutes keeping a tight grip on your senses with a heavy dose of slapstick comedy, complicated-if-convoluted plotting and extravagant fight sequences".
