= Bhavani Sre =

Indian actress and playback singer

- Born: Bhavani Sre Venkatesh; 4 April; Madras, Tamil Nadu, India (present-day Chennai)
- Occupations: Actress; Playback singer
- Years active: 1995; 2019-present
- Parent(s): G. Venkatesh (Father); A. R. Reihana (mother)
- Relatives: A. R. Rahman (uncle); G. V. Prakash Kumar (brother)
- Family: R. K. Shekhar family

Bhavani Sre (born 4 April) is an Indian actress and playback singer who predominantly works in Tamil films. She is known for her performances in Paava Kadhaigal, Ka Pae Ranasingam and Viduthalai Part 1, Vishwanath & Sons

== Early life ==
Bhavani Sre is the daughter of G. Venkatesh and playback singer A. R. Reihana. Her elder brother G. V. Prakash Kumar is a music composer, playback singer, actor, and producer. As a six month old baby, her crying and laughing noises were used for the song "Poovukkenna Poottu (Halla Gulla)" in Bombay (1995).

== Career ==
Bhavani Sre made her debut as an actress in the 2019 Telugu web series High Priestess, which was released on ZEE5. In 2020, she acted in Vijay Sethupathi's Tamil film Ka Pae Ranasingam, which was her Tamil acting debut. She sang three songs in the 2020 Tamil anthology film Putham Pudhu Kaalai. She has acted in Sudha Kongara's segment "Thangam" in the Tamil anthology film Paava Kadhaigal, which was released on Netflix.

In 2023, Bhavani Sre was cast in Vetrimaaran's film Viduthalai Part 1, it was her first film as a lead actress.

In 2020, she acted in Meesaya Murukku fame actor Ananth Ram's directorial debut film, Nanban Oruvan Vantha Piragu. The film was released in 2024. Vishwanath & Sons was released in 2026

== Filmography ==
=== Films ===
Key
†	Denotes films that have not yet been released

- All films are in Tamil, unless otherwise noted.

List of performances in films
Year	Title	Role	Notes	Ref.
2020	Ka Pae Ranasingam	Maayi		
2020	Paava Kadhaigal	Sahira	Netflix anthology film; segment: Thangam	
2023	Viduthalai Part 1	Tamilarasi aka Paapa	Nominated—Filmfare Award for Best Actress – Tamil; Won–JFW Award for Best Actress in a Lead Role – Critic	
2024	Nanban Oruvan Vantha Piragu	Kannamma		
2024	Viduthalai Part 2	Tamilarasi aka Paapa	Cameo appearance	
2026	Hot Spot 2 Much	Nithya	Anthology film Segment - Yours Lovingly, Love	
2026	Kaalidas 2	DSP Vaishnavi		
2026	Vishwanath & Sons	Meghana		
2026	Dharani Rasendran's Next	TBA	Filming	

=== As singer ===
Year	Song	Film	Composer	Notes
1995	"Poovukkenna Poottu (Halla Gulla)"	Bombay	A. R. Rahman	Uncredited
2018	"Shirdi Sai Baba"	—N/a	G. V. Prakash Kumar	Hindi album song
2020	"Oho Endhan Baby"	Putham Pudhu Kaalai	G. V. Prakash Kumar	
2020	"Kulfi Kuchchi"	Putham Pudhu Kaalai	G. V. Prakash Kumar	
2020	"Kannam Adhil Vannam"	Putham Pudhu Kaalai	G. V. Prakash Kumar	

=== Web series ===
Year	Title	Role	Platform	Language	Ref.
2019	High Priestess	young Swathi Reddy	Zee5	Telugu	

=== Music videos ===
Year	Title	Music	Ref.
2017	Po Po Yen	AH Kaashif	
2019	Kannatti	AH Kaashif	
