= Ponmaalai Pozhudhu =

2013 Indian film by A. C. Durai

- Theatrical release poster
- Directed by: A. C. Durai
- Produced by: Amirtha Gowri
- Starring: Aadhav Kannadasan; Gayathrie
- Cinematography: Rajavel Olhiveeran
- Edited by: Ramsudharsan
- Music by: C. Sathya
- Production company: AG Creations
- Release date: 30 August 2013
- Running time: 128 minutes
- Country: India
- Language: Tamil

Ponmaalai Pozhudhu (transl. Golden Evening Hours) is a 2013 Indian Tamil-language film directed by A. C. Durai and produced by Amritha Gowri. Inspired from a real-life incident, the film stars Aadhav Kannadasan and Gayathrie, with Kishore, Aruldoss and Anupama Kumar in supporting roles. The music was composed by C. Sathya, with cinematography by Rajavel Olhiveeran and editing by Ramsudharan. The film was released on 30 August 2013.

== Cast ==
- Aadhav Kannadasan as Arjun
- Gayathrie as Divya
- Kishore as Arjun's father
- Aruldoss as Divya's father
- Anupama Kumar as Arjun's mother
- Safeena Abid
- Ananth Ram
- Rahul

== Production ==
The film's title is derived from a song from Nizhalgal (1980). Speaking to The New Indian Express, Aadhav Kannadasan described his role as a "school boy". He was 86 kg, and had to shed 12 kilos for the role. Director Durai made him hang out with the four school children in the film to imbibe their body language. During the filming of a scene where Aruldoss' character slaps Gayathrie, the actor accidentally slapped the actress for real, and subsequently apologised to her in a press meet.

== Soundtrack ==
The soundtrack was composed by C. Sathya. It was released in early June 2012.

Track listing
No.	Title	Lyrics	Singer(s)	Length
1.	"Adikadi Mudi"	Karthik Netha	Hariharan, Sathyan, Priya Himesh	4:23
2.	"Masala Chicks"	Madhan Karky	Ramya NSK	3:57
3.	"Nee Indri"	Madhan Karky	Sathya	2:11
4.	"Vaarkothumai Kallodu"	Madhan Karky	Blaaze, Krishna Iyer, Sayanora Philip, Archith, Santhosh	4:22
5.	"Iravugalil"	Thamarai	Karthik, Steeve Vatz	3:24
Total length:				18:17

== Release ==
After being delayed for over a year, the film was scheduled to release on 26 July 2013; however it was delayed due to shortage of screens, and ultimately released on 30 August.

== Critical reception ==
Baradwaj Rangan wrote for The Hindu, "Ponmaalai Pozhudhu could have been a Maro Charitra/Ek Duuje Ke Liye for the Facebook generation – but the film, too often, reaches for tired old tropes" and added "Kishore and Anupama Kumar, as the parents of Arjun (Aadhav Kannadasan), the protagonist, recede into their roles with quiet professionalism". IANS rated the film 2 out of 5, calling it "Good story, bad execution" and said, "Aadhav and Gayathrie hit it off as an aimless young pair, but miss the energy to create ripples with their performances. Kishore and Anupama Kumar as Aadhav's parents are the best characters in the entire film". Malini Mannath of The New Indian Express mentioned, "The film is a promising effort by a debutant director." Sify wrote, "On the whole, the love story has nothing new to offer and is predictable at every turn, with its message ending".
