= Barsa (film) =

- Theatrical release poster
- Directed by: Devadas Kapikad
- Story by: Devadas Kapikad
- Produced by: Sharmila Kapikad, Mukhesh Hegde & Swapna Kini
- Starring: Arjun Kapikad; Kshama Shetty
- Cinematography: PL Ravee
- Edited by: Sujith Nayak
- Music by: Devadas Kapikad; Background score: Manikanth Kadri
- Release date: 13 October 2016
- Country: India
- Language: Tulu

Barsa (English: Rain) is a 2016 Indian Tulu-language film directed by Devadas Kapikad, Starring Arjun Kapikad, Kshama Shetty, Aravind Bolar, and Bhojaraj Vamanjoor in lead roles. The movie was produced by Sharmila Kapikad, Mukhesh Hegde and Swapna Kini under the banner of Bolli Movies.

== Plot ==
Prithvi falls in love with Swathi at a young age. Later he leaves town and comes back after 14 years. What happens next is what you have to see in cinemas. The film narrates the story of persecution of the land mafia don.

== Cast ==
- Arjun Kapikad
- Kshama Shetty
- Bhojaraj Vamanjoor
- Aravind Bolar
- Thimmappa Kulal

== Soundtrack ==
Barsa

Soundtrack album by Devadas Kapikad
- Released: 3 Sept 2016
- Genre: Feature film soundtrack
- Label: Anand Audio

The soundtrack of the film was composed by Devadas Kapikad and background score by Manikanth Kadri. The soundtrack album was released on 3 Sept 2016 with the Anand Audio acquiring the audio rights.

Tracklist
No.	Title	Lyrics	Singer(s)	Length
1.	"Traseda Pettg"	Devadas Kapikad	Devadas Kapikad
2.	"Moned Ninna"	Arjun Kapikad	Arjun Kapikad, Roopa Prakash
3.	"Tulunad"	Devadas Kapikad	Devadas Kapikad
4.	"Oh My Baby"	Devadas Kapikad	Karthik, Arjun Kapikad
