= Neetha Ashok =

Indian actress

- Born: Neetha Ashok Herle; February 01 1991; Kota, Udupi district, Karnataka, India
- Education: MBA Finance
- Occupation: Actress
- Years active: 2014 – present

Neetha Ashok is an Indian actress primarily known for her work in Kannada films. She made her acting debut with the Tulu film Jabardasth Shankara (2019). Neetha gained recognition with her Kannada debut Vikrant Rona (2022).

== Early life ==
Neetha was born in a Kota Brahmin family in coastal region village called Kota Village from Udupi District, Karnataka which is near Kundapura Town, and lived in Delhi, Mangaluru and Bengaluru. Her father is Ashok Herle, a banker and mother is Geetha Ashok Herle. She calls herself the great-granddaughter of Shivaram Karanth.

== Career ==
Neetha Ashok starred in three Kannada television serials including Yashodhe, Naa Ninna Bidalaare, and Neelambari as the lead as well as a Hindi serial on Doordarshan. She made her feature film debut with the Tulu film Jabardasth Shankara starring her school senior Arjun Kapikad directed by Devadas Kapikad. Regarding her and Rashi Balakrishna's performances in the film, a critic wrote that they are "ravishingly beautiful and give a fine performance as romantic interests". She made her Kannada film debut with Vikrant Rona (2022) after she met Sudeep at a Colors Kannada party.

== Filmography ==
=== Films ===
| Year | Film | Role | Language | Notes | Ref. |
|---|---|---|---|---|---|
| 2019 | Jabardasth Shankara | Lavanya | Tulu | | |
| 2022 | Vikrant Rona | Aparna Ballal "Panna" | Kannada | | |

=== Television ===
| Year | Title | Role | Language | Ref. |
|---|---|---|---|---|
| 2014 | Yashodhe | Yashodhe | Kannada | |
| 2016 | Naa Ninna Bidalaare | Nandini | Kannada | |
| | Aashiyan | | Hindi | |
| 2018 | Neelambari | | Kannada | |

== Awards and nominations ==
| Year | Award | Category | Film | Result | Ref. |
|---|---|---|---|---|---|
| 2023 | 11th South Indian International Movie Awards | Best Female Debut – Kannada | Vikrant Rona | Won | |
