= Indrajith (2017 film) =

2017 film directed by Kalaprabhu

- Theatrical release poster
- Directed by: Kalaprabhu
- Written by: Kalaprabhu
- Produced by: Kalaipuli S. Thanu
- Starring: Gautham Ram Karthik; Ashrita Shetty; Sonarika Bhadoria
- Cinematography: Rasamathi
- Edited by: V. T. Vijayan; S. R. Ganesh Babu
- Music by: KP
- Production company: V Creations
- Release date: 24 November 2017
- Country: India
- Language: Tamil

Indrajith is a 2017 Indian Tamil-language action adventure thriller film directed by Kalaprabhu and produced by his father Kalaipuli S. Thanu. The film features Gautham Ram Karthik and Ashrita Shetty in the lead roles, while Sonarika Bhadoria, Sudhanshu Pandey, Sachin Khedekar, Nagendra Babu, and M. S. Bhaskar play supporting roles. The film received mostly negative reviews and was a flop at the box office.

== Plot ==
Mayilvaganam, a retired archeological professor, is in search of a mystical stone mentioned in the holy books, which can cure dreaded diseases like cancer. In his hunt for the stone, he forms a team of youngsters, including Indrajith, a happy-go-lucky guy and adventure junkie. Whilst the team has a well-laid out map, they are up against Kapil Sharma, the head of the Archaeological Survey of India and an old foe of Mayilvaganam. Later, when Indrajith gets the stone, he realizes that Mayilvaganam is evil and not Sharma, so he gives the stone to Kapil. Mayilvaganam is jailed, and Sharma decides to share the stone with other countries as well to cure diseases on Indrajith's advice. Indrajith says," Let's share", and they all laugh.

== Cast ==
- Gautham Ram Karthik as Indrajith
- Sonarika Bhadoria as Meetah
- Ashrita Shetty as Smitha
- Sachin Khedekar as Mayil Vahanam
- Sudhanshu Pandey as Kapil Sharma
- Nagendra Babu as Ravi
- M. S. Bhaskar as Salim
- Rajveer Ankur Singh as Tarang Singh
- A. Ilankumaran as Pilot
- Nakshathra Nagesh as Student
- Ranjan
- Sabari
- Prabhakaran Venkatachalam
- Amit Singh
- Muthalaya Vedimuthu
- Jennifer
- Harikrishnan

== Production ==
The collaboration between actor and director was first reported in October 2013, with Kalaprabhu revealing that his second venture after Sakkarakatti (2008), would be an action-adventure film produced by his father. Gautham Karthik was signed to play the title role, while actresses Ashrita Shetty and Sonarika Bhadoria were selected to play female leading roles. Shankar–Ehsaan–Loy were initially announced as the film's music composers, but delays later meant that newcomer KP was selected to compose the film's soundtrack and score. A first look poster for the film was revealed in January 2014, stating that production was in progress. The team announced that schedules were set to take place in Chennai, Arunachal Pradesh and then Goa, while also revealing that the title was a reference to the character Indrajith from the Indian epic Ramayana. It was later revealed that the film would be along the lines of the Indiana Jones films, with Gautham Karthik and Sonarika featuring in a group of fortune seekers, also including Sudanshu Pandey and theatre actor Amit.

The team began filming in early 2014, with shoots conducted in Chennai and Pondicherry. A further twelve-day shoot schedule in Goa during July 2014, with Sachin Khedekar joining the cast to portray a professor. After a long schedule break, the team reconvened in April 2015 to complete the rest of the shoot. Sports person turned actor Rajveer Singh is essaying the role of antagonist.

The film's teaser trailer was released during April 2016 and was attached to screenings featuring Thanu's other production, Theri (2016). In an interview in May 2016, Gautham Karthik revealed that the film was completed and was awaiting a release date.

== Soundtrack ==
Indrajith

Soundtrack album by KP
- Released: 2017
- Recorded: 2016
- Genre: Feature film soundtrack
- Label: Think Music India
- Producer: KP

KP chronology
Indrajith (2017)	Bodhai Yeri Budhi Maari (2019)

The film's soundtrack was composed by K. P.

- "Sembaruthi" - Bombay Jayashree
- "Aayiram Thamarai" - Karthik, Shilvi Sharon
- "Kadhal Veesi" - Neha Bhasin
- "Vidigira Vaanil" - Javed Ali
- "Ennenna Kaatchigal" - Jaspreet Jasz, Arjun Chandy

== Reception ==
The Indian Express said, "Indrajith is an example of a lazily produced movie that doesn’t even try to keep the viewer engaged.". Vishal Menon of The Hindu wrote that "The film is big on ambition and nothing else". Anupama Subramanian of Deccan Chronicle stated that "The plot had all the potential of an engaging adventure thriller had Kala Prabhu given a thoughtful and believable screenplay"

Sreedhar Pillai critic of Firstpost rated 2.5 out of 5 and stated that "The film has an interesting plot, but the writing is weak and there are far too many logical loopholes in the narrative". Thinkal Menon of The Times of India gave 2 out of 5 rating and wrote that "The film has an ambitious plot, but is ruined with lackadaisical writing, poor CG and half-baked characters".

The News Minute critic wrote that "The film also doesn’t do justice to the exotic locations it travels through.".
