= Sangathalaivan =

2021 Indian film

- Theatrical release poster
- Directed by: Manimaran
- Screenplay by: Manimaran
- Based on: Thariyudan by Bharathinathan
- Produced by: Udaya Kumar; Geetha Udaya Kumar; Vetrimaaran
- Starring: Samuthirakani; Karunas; Ramya Subramanian
- Cinematography: Srinivas Devamsam
- Edited by: G. B. Venkatesh
- Music by: Robert Sargunam
- Production companies: Uday Productions; Grass Root Film Company
- Release date: 26 February 2021
- Country: India
- Language: Tamil

Sangathalaivan (transl. Union Leader) is a 2021 Indian Tamil-language action drama film written and directed by Manimaran. Based on the novel Thariyudan by Bharathinathan, the film stars Samuthirakani, Karunas and Ramya Subramanian in the lead roles. The music was composed by Robert Sargunam with cinematography by Srinivas Devamsam and editing by G. B. Venkatesh. Produced by Vetrimaaran via Grass Root Film Company, it was released on 26 February 2021.

== Plot ==
Shivalingam is a communist representative and has a trade union. Ranganathan "Rangan" is a hard worker at Govindarajan's powerloom. However, Rangan is against Govindarajan. Rangan provides money for his sister's education and motivates her to work, while his selfish parents force her to work in a loom. Govindarajan's niece Kalyani likes Rangan for his genuine nature. Shivalingam introduces the principles of communism and how they fight against society greed. However, Rangan doubts the principles.

One day at the mill, Divya, Kalyani's friend, severs her lower arm after the equipment suddenly drags her saree. Govindarajan and Rangan take her to the hospital. Govindarajan tells Rangan that she eventually will regain consciousness and instructs Rangan to stay with her. The next day, Divya's father laments after seeing Divya's state. Govindarajan informs him that they cannot fix her hand; he tells Rangan to look after Divya and pays Rangan and Divya's father. Govindarajan tells Rangan that the union people should not know about Divya's incident. Rangan pleads, but Govindarajan dismisses it. Rangan eventually informs Shivalingam at a Communist meeting about Divya's accident.

Shivalingam goes to the hospital the next day. They discuss with Govindarajan and his boss agreeing to a three lakh compensation. That night, Govindrajan takes Rangan and Divya's father to a hotel. Govindarajan gets Divya's father drunk, gets his thumbprint on documents, and pays him thirty thousand. Shivalingam and his men visit Govindarajan at the hospital and force Govindarajan to write a check for three lakhs and give the documents. Kalyani confesses her love for Rangan.

A drunk Govindarajan's nephew inquires with Divya's father, who reveals that Rangan spoke with the union people and got Divya's compensation. Govindarajan argues with his nephew, who informs that Rangan informed the union people to visit the hospital. Govindarajan does not trust Rangan anymore. Kalyani tells Rangan that Govindarajan found out what Rangan had done, and she tells Rangan to thank Shivalingam for his effort.

Govindarajan shouts at a young worker, Saravanan, so the latter burns the factory. Govindarajan files a complaint, and a police officer beats Rangan at the police station. Shivalingam goes to the station, and Saravanan lies and says that Rangan instigated him to burn the factory. After convincing a judge, the police officer releases Rangan. Shivalingam informs the DSP, who instructs the police officer to apologize to Shivalingam and Rangan. However, Rangan decides to tell the truth in court, sending Govindarajan to jail.

Rangan stays at Shivalingam's house with his pregnant wife. Divya and Kalyani visit Rangan and are upset. Rangan helps around the farm and joins the union, attending secret meetings and planning strikes. Kalyani meets with Rangan and tells him that her mother is finding a groom for her and that he should ask for a share from his family to start a business. Govindarajan gets released from jail. His nephew informs him that the workers have joined the union. Govindarajan gets angry at Kalyani and Rangan's relationship. Despite his family's opposition, Rangan organizes his sister's wedding. Shivalingam gets arrested by the police and motivates Rangan to lead the strike. Shivalingam's wife goes into labor and gives birth to a girl. Shivalingam's wife tells Rangan to keep leading the strike despite people's pleas. Rangan conducts the strike for the people and rips Govindarajan's shirt. Rangan hides after the police threaten to arrest him.

Shivalingam gets released and goes home. Rangan surrenders to the court and gets 15 days of judicial custody. The collector arranges a wage hike negotiation between the union and the owners. The bosses agree to the union's demands. Divya informs Rangan that Kalyani got married. Shivalingam praises Rangan's revolutionary spirit. Kalyani sees Rangan talking to supporters; that night, Govindarajan and Kalyani's brother discuss killing him to stop him from interfering, which Kalyani overhears. Rangan leaves early during a communist event.

A farmer finds Rangan murdered that night. Shivalingam gets upset at his death. Rangan's murder upsets the entire village, especially Divya, Kalyani, and Rangan's younger sister. Kalyani tells Shivalingam that she heard her brother say he killed Rangan and that Shivalingam should kill Govindarajan. In anger, Shivalingam and his men go to Govindarajan's estate. As Govindarajan's associates escape, the gang surrounds and kills him, avenging Rangan's death.

== Cast ==
- Samuthirakani as Sivalingam
- Karunas as Ranganathan "Rangan"
- Ramya Subramanian as Lakshmi
- Robo Shankar as Subramani
- G. Marimuthu as Govindarajan
- E. Ramdoss as Rangan's father
- Cheenu Mohan as Capitalist
- Sampath Ram as Police Officer
- Junior Balaiah as Karmegam
- Ganja Karuppu as Sekhar
- Vikram
- Ramachandran as Govindarajan's nephew
- Karate Karthi
- Shanthi Mani
- Bala Singh as Communist (Special appearance)
- Priyadarshini Rajkumar as Rangan's sister-in-law

== Production ==
The film was announced in October 2017, with director Manimaran and producer Vetrimaaran announcing that they would make a film starring Samuthirakani. Based on the novel Thariyudan, the story was to be set in the areas of Salem, Erode and Tirupur, and was said to focus on the lives of handloom weavers and the struggles they face. Ramya Subramanian was cast in the film after being recommended by Velraj and shot for the film in rural Tamil Nadu.

== Soundtrack ==
The soundtrack was composed by Robert Sargunam.

Sangathalaivan

Soundtrack album by Robert Sargunam
- Released: 2021
- Length: 11:33
- Language: Tamil
- Label: Divo
- Producer: Robert Sargunam

Robert Sargunam chronology
Sangathalaivan (2021)	Noodles (2023)

Track listing
No.	Title	Lyrics	Singer(s)	Length
1.	"Sarvesa"	Yugabharathi	Jayamoorthy	4:06
2.	"Pudhu Vidha"	Uma Devi	Saindhavi	3:56
3.	"Porattam Illamal"	Yugabharathi, Uma Devi	Arunraja Kamaraj, Teejay, Robert Sargunam, Barath Veeraraghavan	3:31

== Release and reception ==
The film was released theatrically across Tamil Nadu on 26 February 2021. A critic from The Hindu noted "this idealistic take on an ideology lacks verve" and that the film "fails to sell its politics convincingly". A reviewer from The Times of India stated "despite having a few interestingly-written characters, Sangathalaivan is another half-baked attempt which relies more on conveying ideologies."

Sify called the film "average", adding "the problem is that the director fails to pack the content of the novel within a two-hour film. The editing is shoddy and we get the feel that several scenes were chopped off to speed up the proceedings." In contrast, News Today noted "Sangathalaivan provides a good watch. The characters shown with various emotions engrosses audience. Had it been less preachy, this sure to leave an impact." Likewise, Cinema Express noted it was "a slow-burn drama that give us the pleasant feeling of reading a novel from the 90s."
