= Vikram Sugumaran =

Indian film director and screenwriter

- Born: 11 April 1977 (age 49); Paramakudi, Ramanathapuram, Tamil Nadu, India
- Died: 2 June 2025; Chennai, Tamil Nadu, India
- Occupations: Film director; screenwriter; actor
- Years active: 2007–2025

Vikram Sugumaran (11 April 1977 – 2 June 2025) was an Indian film director, screenwriter and actor primarily associated with Tamil cinema. He is widely known for his critically acclaimed debut as a director with the film Madha Yaanai Koottam (2013).

== Career ==
Vikram Sugumaran began his career in the Tamil film industry around 1999–2000. He worked as an assistant director who worked with film director Balu Mahendra, contributing to short films and television projects. He later collaborated with Vetrimaaran, contributing associate director and dialogue writer for Polladhavan and the National Award-winning film Aadukalam (2011). This marked his rise in the industry as a socially conscious storyteller.

He made his directorial debut with Madha Yaanai Koottam in 2013, a drama thriller film that received critical acclaim for praise for its grounded storytelling and portrayal of caste conflicts. The film was produced by G. V. Prakash Kumar and starring Kathir, Vela Ramamoorthy and Oviya.

After a decade-long break, he returned with Raavana Kottam in 2023, an action drama film set in southern Tamil Nadu. The film, starring Shanthanu Bhagyaraj and Anandhi, dealt with land rights, caste politics, and media narratives. While the film received mixed reviews, it reaffirmed Vikram's interest in socially grounded cinema.

Vikram Sugumaran was played acting roles in Tamil cinema before becoming a full-time director. He made a brief appearance in Polladhavan (2007), directed by Vetrimaaran, and later appeared in Kodiveeran, directed by M. Muthaiah and he played the role of heroine's brother(2017).

=== Unfinished projects ===
At the time of his untimely death, Vikram Sugumaran was reportedly developing a third directorial project under titles like Therum Porum, said to be centered on mountaineering-a thematic departure from his previous rural-centric stories. Actress Viji Chandrasekhar later revealed he was slated to start directing this project within two months. In March 2025, Vikram Sugumaran was set to direct a web series for based on the lives of Madurai-based folk artists, with the story and concept penned by Soori, who also aimed to play the lead role.

== Death ==
Vikram Sugumaran died on 2 June 2025 at the age of 48, due to a sudden cardiac arrest while traveling by bus from Madurai to Chennai after a script narration. Despite emergency medical attention at a hospital in Chennai, he was declared dead. His passing was widely mourned in the Tamil film industry. He is survived by his wife and children.

== Filmmaking style ==
Vikram Sugumaran's filmmaking style was defined by a strong sense of rural authenticity, political awareness and social critique. He was known for portraying real-life social structures, especially focusing on issues like caste discrimination, power imbalance, and cultural identity in Tamil Nadu's interior regions. His direction often emphasized naturalistic performances, minimalist visuals, and the use of native dialects, giving his work a grounded and unfiltered tone. Critics and peers described his approach as thoughtful and uncompromising, committed to telling emotionally resonant stories without relying on commercial tropes or glamour. He used cinema as a medium to raise questions about justice and inequality, rather than simply entertain, drawing praise for his intellectual honesty and cultural sensitivity.

== Filmography ==
=== As director and writer ===
Year	Title	Credited as		Notes
Year	Title	Director	Writer	Notes
2007	Polladhavan	Associate director	✗	
2011	Aadukalam	✗	✓	Additional screenplay and dialogues only
2013	Madha Yaanai Koottam	✓	✓	Debut film as a director
2023	Viduthalai Part 1	Second unit director	✓	
2023	Raavana Kottam	✓	✓	Final film
2024	Viduthalai Part 2	Second unit director	✓	Posthumous release

=== As actor ===
- Note: all films are in Tamil, unless otherwise noted.

Year	Film	Role	Notes
2007	Polladhavan	Selvam's henchman	Uncredited role
2017	Kodiveeran	Durai	
