= Viduthalai Part 2 =

2024 Indian film by Vetrimaaran

- Theatrical release poster
- Directed by: Vetrimaaran
- Written by: Vetrimaaran; R. S. Durai Senthilkumar; Mathimaran Pugazhendhi; Vikram Sugumaran; Tamizh
- Screenplay by: Vetrimaaran; Manimaran
- Dialogues by: Thai. Kandasaamy; Manimaran; Vetrimaaran
- Produced by: Elred Kumar; Vetrimaaran
- Starring: Vijay Sethupathi; Soori; Manju Warrier; Kishore; Gautham Vasudev Menon; Bhavani Sre
- Cinematography: R. Velraj
- Edited by: R. Ramar
- Music by: Ilaiyaraaja
- Production companies: RS Infotainment; Grass Root Film Company
- Distributed by: Red Giant Movies
- Release dates: 31 January 2024 (International Film Festival Rotterdam); 20 December 2024 (India)
- Running time: 171 minutes
- Country: India
- Language: Tamil
- Budget: ₹65–70 crore (shared with Part 1)
- Box office: est. ₹55–64 crore

Viduthalai Part 2 (transl. Liberation Part 2) is a 2024 Indian Tamil-language period political crime thriller film directed and co-produced by Vetrimaaran under RS Infotainment and Grass Root Film Company. It is a sequel to Viduthalai Part 1 (2023). The film follows the travels of a police constable amidst an operation to apprehend a revolutionary. Vijay Sethupathi, Soori, Gautham Vasudev Menon, Bhavani Sre, Rajiv Menon, Ilavarasu, Balaji Sakthivel, Saravana Subbiah, Chetan and Munnar Ramesh reprise their roles from the first film, with Manju Warrier, Kishore, Anurag Kashyap, Bose Venkat, Vincent Asokan and Ken Karunas joining the ensemble cast.

Viduthalai was originally announced as a single film in April 2021, while the principal photography had commenced in the previous December, shooting predominantly in Sathyamangalam and Chengalpattu. In September 2022, however, the film was announced to be split into two parts. The filming of the first part was wrapped by late-December 2022, while the filming of this part wrapped by early October 2024. The film score and music was composed by Ilaiyaraaja, cinematography handled by R. Velraj and editing by R. Ramar.

Viduthalai Part 2, along with the first part, was screened on 31 January 2024 in the International Film Festival Rotterdam. The film was released in theatres on 20 December 2024 and grossed an estimated ₹55–64 crore worldwide.

== Plot ==
DSP Sunil Menon interrogates the captured Makkal Padai leader, "Vaathiyar" Perumal. Meanwhile, Constable Kumaresan is suspended by Officer-in-Charge Ragavendar on minor grounds and denied credit for arresting Perumal. As Kumaresan prepares to return to his village with the traumatized Tamilarasi "Pappa", Sunil calls him to act as a driver for a convoy escorting Perumal through the jungle to a secure facility. During the journey, Perumal recounts his path to radicalization.

Originally a schoolteacher, Perumal's life changes after a young farm labourer named Karuppan kills an abusive landlord who had abducted and sexually assaulted his wife, Maari. When Perumal tries to hand Karuppan over to the police for formal trial, corrupt officers alerts the landlord's vengeful son, who murders the couple and severely injures Perumal. Rescued by a political activist named KK, Perumal embraces revolutionary politics.

Following KK's guidance, Perumal adopts the alias Karuppan and works at the Mahalakshmi Sugar Factory to organize a labour union. He meets Mahalakshmi, the factory owner's daughter, who shares his ideals; they eventually marry and have a daughter. The union is formed after the brutal murder of Comrade Rangasamy, a fellow organizer. Following the establishment of Makkal Padai, KK is assassinated in the factory, prompting Perumal and his comrades to avenge the perpetrators. The government subsequently bans the group, forcing them underground.

In the present, the police convoy becomes lost in the dense forest. When Ragavendar accidentally slips into a ravine, Perumal uses his binding chain to save him. The officers remove Perumal's handcuffs and Ragavendar confesses to accidentally shooting Raghu and later killing him to protect his job. Addressing the train bombing, Perumal explains that Makkal Padai originally planted explosives as a protest to scare the opposition. However, authorities refused to act on the threat and a mishandled defusal attempt caused an accidental detonation that destroyed the bridge and derailed the train.

Perumal offers to guide the officers back to the barraks, but Makkal Padai insurgents ambush the convoy and liberate him. As they retreat, an embarrassed Ragavendar deliberately shoots Perumal in the leg to slow his escape. Meanwhile, news leaks of Perumal's arrest and the police brutality, prompting Chief Secretary A. Subramaniyan to order Ragavendar's arrest and promote Sub Inspector Amudan as the new Officer-in-Charge to recapture Perumal.

A fierce gunfight breaks out between the police and Makkal Padai. Fearing his subordinates will expose his murder of Raghu, Ragavendar executes one of his own officers and frames the insurgents. Believing Ragavendar's lie, Amudan executes all surrendered Makkal Padai members. When Ragavendar attempts to kill another officer, Kumaresan intervenes and restrains him, exposing Ragavendar's betrayal to Amudan.

Weakened by his leg wound and surrounded by the police, Perumal steps forward to surrender peacefully to protect his remaining comrades. However, Amudan shoots him at point-blank range and orders a barrage from the battalion. As Perumal attempts to stand, driven by memories of his wife, Constable Bala is forced to shoot him dead.

As Kumaresan drives Amudan, Ragavendar, and Bala back to the barracks with Perumal's corpse, Amudan boasts about their upcoming promotions. Enraged, Kumaresan intentionally crashes the jeep into a ravine, trapping the officers inside and walks away. Later, he writes a final letter to his mother, stating that if he does not return, she should know he died helping those in need.

== Cast ==
- Vijay Sethupathi as Perumal "Vaathiyaar", the leader of Makkal Padai
- Soori as Constable Kumaresan (#1563)
- Manju Warrier as Mahalakshmi, Perumal's wife
- Kishore as KK, Perumal's mentor
- Bhavani Sre as Tamilarasi alias Paapa, Kumaresan's love interest
- Gautham Vasudev Menon as DSP R. Sunil Menon I.P.S
- Rajiv Menon as A. Subramaniyan I.A.S., Chief Secretary to Government of Tamil Nadu
- Bose Venkat as a ruthless landlord
- Manobala as a station master (Note: Posthumous release)
- Vincent Asokan as Mahalakshmi's father
- Anurag Kashyap as a Naxal Radical from Bengal
- Ilavarasu as PWD Minister Ilavarasu
- Balaji Sakthivel as an Advocate associated with Makkal Padai
- Saravana Subbiah as the Collector of Arumapuri District
- Tamizh as Sub-inspector Amudan
- Chetan as V. Ragavendar, Officer-in-Charge (OC) of E-Company
- Aryan as Constable Aari
- Munnar Ramesh as Sub-inspector "Chow Chow" Ramasamy
- Pavel Navageethan as Pavel, the photojournalist at the train derailment spot
- Sardar Sathya as Sub-inspector Velmurugan
- Ken Karunas as Karuppan
- Bala Hasan as Bala, constable
- S. Chandran as Head constable Chandran
- Asuran Krishna
- Aruldoss
- R. Velraj as a landlord
- Sampath Ram
- Sindhuja Viji as Mahalakshmi's sister-in-law
- Jaivanth as Mahalakshmi's brother
- Sundareswaran CVC as T.A.,
- R. Ganesh Gurung as Natarajan
- Prakash Raj as PR (cameo appearance; deleted scene)

== Production ==
Viduthalai was originated to be a single film. However, in July 2022, it was reported that it would be split into two parts due to the film becoming overlong and not wanting to trim the film tampering the story, which was officially announced on Vetrimaaran's birthday (4 September 2022). Both parts were shot back-to-back, with the first part's shooting wrapping up in November, and the film releasing on 31 March 2023, but with the second part still having to shoot a few portions, which resumed in July. Bharathiraja was initially cast in the film but was later replaced by Kishore due to the weather of Sathyamangalam affecting the former's health. As of July 2024, the filming was in its final stages. The dubbing process began on 10 October with a puja. On 6 December 2024, the makers announced that the background score work had been completed.

== Music ==
Viduthalai Part 2

Soundtrack album by Ilaiyaraaja
- Genre: Feature film soundtrack
- Language: Tamil
- Label: Sony Music Entertainment India Pvt. Ltd.
- Producer: Ilaiyaraaja

Ilaiyaraaja chronology
Jama (2024)	Viduthalai Part 2 (2024)	Padai Thalaivan (TBA)

Singles from Viduthalai Part 2
- 1. "Dhinam Dhinamum" Released: 17 November 2024; 2. "Manasula" Released: 27 November 2024; 3. "Poruthadhu Podhum" Released: 28 November 2024

Jukebox
- Viduthalai Part 2 – Jukebox on YouTube

The film's soundtrack is composed by Ilaiyaraaja, who also composed the first part. He had composed the songs for the film in his newly launched music studio in Kodambakkam, after his fallout with Prasad Studios where he recorded songs for nearly four decades; It marks his first work being recorded at his new studio where music composition of the film began in February 2021. As of May 2021, Ilaiyaraaja recorded three out of eight songs being planned for the film and are touted to be "situational numbers" as per sources. The music rights were purchased by Sony Music India. The first single "Dhinam Dhinamum" sung and written by Ilaiyaraaja was released on 17 November 2024. The second single "Manasula" was released on 27 November 2024. The third single "Poruthadhu Podhum" was released on 28 November 2024.

Track listing
No.	Title	Lyrics	Singer(s)	Length
1.	"Manasula"	Ilaiyaraaja	Sanjay Subrahmanyan, Ananya Bhat	4:08
2.	"Poruthadhu Podham"	Yugabharathi	Yogi B	4:34
3.	"Dhinam Dhinamum"	Ilaiyaraaja	Ilaiyaraaja, Ananya Bhat	5:44
4.	"Iruttu Kaattula"	Yugabharathi	Suganthi	5:34

== Release ==
=== Premiere ===
The film along with its predecessor had its world premiere at 53rd International Film Festival Rotterdam on 31 January 2024.

=== Theatrical ===
Viduthalai Part 2 was theatrically released on 20 December 2024. The distribution rights for Tamil Nadu were acquired by Red Giant Movies.

=== Home media ===
The film began streaming on Amazon Prime Video from 19 January 2025 in Tamil, Telugu and Malayalam languages. The Hindi version began streaming on ZEE5 from 28 March 2025.

== Reception ==
=== Critical response ===
Desimartini reported that Viduthalai Part 2 received positive reviews from critics, who praised the film's "gripping narrative" but were critical of the dubbing. OTTPlay noted that they were more mixed, with criticism towards the "preachiness".

Risha Ganguly of Times Now gave 3.5/5 stars and wrote "Viduthalai Part 2 is a bold attempt at closing an ambitious story, with Vetrimaaran's signature storytelling and strong performances standing out. However, the uneven pacing and lack of narrative clarity prevent it from reaching the heights of its predecessor." Avinash Ramachandran of The Indian Express gave 3/5 stars and wrote "This Vetrimaaran-Vijay Sethupathi film is mostly grim that drives home the weight of a decision, and the weight of choosing a path, and how it is the path that makes a revolutionary decide their weapon." M Suganth of The Times of India gave 3/5 stars and wrote "Where Viduthalai: Part 2 feels underwhelming is in not being a truly compelling film. Like the cops circling about the same places inside the forest, the film keeps reiterating the same points [...] but it cannot provide a permanent solution."

Janani K of India Today rated 3/5 stars and wrote "Viduthalai Part 2 gives proper closure to the characters and the story, and it is a commendable effort. With some recurring lip-sync issues and a dialogue-driven storyline, the sequel ends the story with many progressive ideologies and opinions on display." Sudhir Srinivasan of Cinema Express gave 3/5 stars and wrote "Viduthalai Part 2 leans too heavily on theorising and sloganeering. Vaathiyaar's lectures feel more academic than emotional, with utilitarian arguments often preferred over poignant silences." Anusha Sundar of OTTPlay gave 3/5 stars and wrote "In a Vetrimaaran film where political ideologies are not just laced but outspoken, Viduthalai 2 may come of disjointed in parts but still carries a tale to be told."

Kirubhakar Purushothaman of News18 gave 2/5 stars and wrote "In essence, Viduthalai Part 2 is Vetri Maaran constantly finding ways to tell you the uninspiring story, which he couldn't show." Gopinath Rajendran of The Hindu wrote "Despite a strong political core that puts out a message that's unfortunately relevant even in today's world and strong performances [...] Vetri Maaran's sequel lacks the emotions that worked wonders with the first part." Latha Srinivasan of Hindustan Times wrote "Unfortunately, Vetrimaaran, the astute writer, seemed to be missing in this film and that was disappointing. Viduthalai Part 2 carries a strong ideological theme and is another socially relevant film from Vetrimaaran."

=== Box office ===
The film concluded its theatrical run in mid-January 2025, with the worldwide gross estimated to be ₹55 crore (equivalent to ₹59 crore or US$6.1 million in 2026) or ₹64 crore (equivalent to ₹68 crore or US$7.1 million in 2026).
