= Manushi (film) =

Tamil-language political drama film

- Film poster
- Directed by: N. Gopi Nainar
- Written by: N. Gopi Nainar
- Produced by: Vetrimaaran; Ishan Saksena
- Starring: Andrea Jeremiah; Nassar; Tamizh; Balaji Sakthivel; Hakkim Shah
- Cinematography: A. M. Edwin Sakay
- Edited by: Anthony; R. Ramar
- Music by: Ilaiyaraaja
- Production companies: Grass Root Film Company; B4U Entertainment; IVY Entertainment
- Country: India
- Language: Tamil

Manushi (transl. Woman) is an upcoming Tamil-language political drama film written and directed by N. Gopi Nainar of Aramm (2017) fame and produced by Vetrimaaran and Ishan Saksena under Grass Root Film Company, B4U Entertainment, and IVY Entertainment. The film stars Andrea Jeremiah in the lead role, alongside Nassar, Tamizh, Balaji Sakthivel and Hakkim Shah. Ilaiyaraaja composed the music, while A. M. Edwin Sakay handled cinematography and the editing was done by Anthony and R. Ramar. The film has attracted attention for its legal and societal themes, and its release has been delayed due to challenges in obtaining a censor certificate from the Central Board of Film Certification (CBFC), with the filmmakers required to make multiple cuts and modifications.

== Plot ==
Manushi explores the plight of a woman falsely accused of terrorism, exploring custodial interrogation and institutional injustice.

== Cast ==
- Andrea Jeremiah
- Nassar
- Tamizh
- Balaji Sakthivel as Ramasamy
- Hakkim Shah
- Viji Chandrasekhar
- Kani Thiru

== Production ==
Manushi was announced in 2022, with N. Gopi Nainar at the helm and Andrea Jeremiah cast in the lead role. Manushi delves into the legal and emotional turmoil of a woman subjected to custodial abuse, highlighting issues of human rights and justice. The film's narrative addresses themes such as police violence and state accountability. The film's shooting was completed in 2022. The film’s trailer, released in April 2024, garnered attention for its bold subject matter.

== Censorship and legal battle ==
Upon completion, Manushi faced significant hurdles in obtaining a censor certificate from the Central Board of Film Certification (CBFC). In September 2024, the CBFC denied certification, citing concerns that the film portrayed the state negatively and contained content deemed against national interest. The board specifically demanded 37 cuts and modifications, including the removal of certain dialogues and scenes. Producer Vetrimaaran contested these demands, arguing that they infringed upon the film's artistic freedom and expression.

In June 2025, Vetrimaaran approached the Madras High Court, challenging the CBFC's decision and noting that the board had failed to provide specific objections or an opportunity for the filmmakers to respond. On 4 June 2025, the court directed the CBFC to either specify objectionable scenes by 16 June or arrange a joint screening with the producer. The CBFC agreed to rewatch the film and provide a list of problematic content, with a hearing scheduled for 17 June.

Despite the CBFC listing required cuts, Vetrimaaran opposed them as excessive and arbitrary. The High Court subsequently ordered a private screening on 24 August 2025, with both the CBFC and the producer present to assess the validity of the 37 demanded cuts. Following the screening, Justice N Anand Venkatesh praised the film as a depiction of systemic prejudice. He endorsed some recommended edits such as replacing terms like "Communist" and "rationalist" but resisted removing references to caste or religious belief, recognizing their thematic significance. The court ultimately directed the filmmakers to implement 25 cuts and 12 modifications to obtain certification, balancing artistic freedom with the state’s interest in censorship.
