= Manish Pandey =

Indian cricketer (born 1989)

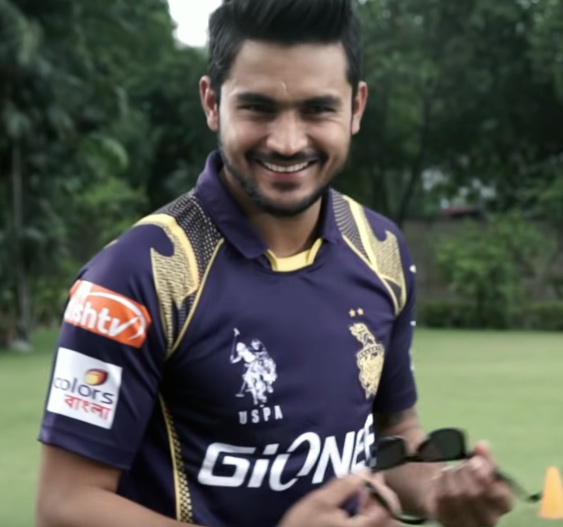
- Pandey in 2015

Personal information
- Full name: Manish Krishnanand Pandey
- Born: 10 September 1989 (age 37); Nainital, Uttarakhand, India
- Height: 1.73 m (5 ft 8 in)
- Batting: Right-handed
- Bowling: Right-arm medium
- Role: Top-order batter
- Relatives: Ashrita Shetty (wife) (m. 2019)

International information
- National side: India (2015–2021)
- ODI debut (cap 206): 14 July 2015 v Zimbabwe
- Last ODI: 23 July 2021 v Sri Lanka
- ODI shirt no.: 37
- T20I debut (cap 52): 17 July 2015 v Zimbabwe
- Last T20I: 4 December 2020 v Australia
- T20I shirt no.: 37

Domestic team information
- Years: Team
- 2006/07–present: Karnataka
- 2008: Mumbai Indians
- 2009–2010: Royal Challengers Bangalore
- 2011–2013: Pune Warriors
- 2014–2017, 2024–present: Kolkata Knight Riders
- 2018–2021: Sunrisers Hyderabad
- 2022: Lucknow Super Giants
- 2023: Delhi Capitals

Career statistics
| Competition | ODI | T20I | LA | T20 |
|---|---|---|---|---|
| Matches | 29 | 39 | 192 | 308 |
| Runs scored | 566 | 709 | 6,310 | 7,008 |
| Batting average | 33.29 | 44.31 | 45.39 | 31.56 |
| 100s/50s | 1/2 | 0/3 | 10/39 | 3/39 |
| Top score | 104* | 79* | 142* | 129* |
| Catches/stumpings | 10/– | 9/– | 105/– | 152/2 |
Medal record
Men's cricket
Representing India
ACC Asia Cup
| Winner | 2018 UAE |
ICC U19 World Cup
| Winner | 2008 Malaysia |
| Runner-up | 2006 Sri Lanka |
- Source: ESPNcricinfo, 15 November 2025

Manish Krishnanand Pandey (Hindi: [mʌˈniːʃ ˈpaːɳɖeː]; born 10 September 1989) is an Indian cricketer. He is a right-handed top-order batsman representing, Karnataka in domestic cricket and Kolkata Knight Riders in the Indian Premier League (IPL). He became the first Indian player to score a century in the IPL in the 2009 season, playing for his former team Royal Challengers Bengaluru. He was a part of the Indian squad which won the 2018 Asia Cup and won the 2014 and 2024 IPL titles with KKR.

== Life and early career ==
Pandey was born in Nainital, Uttarakhand, but moved to Bangalore at the age of 15 with his family. His father was in the Indian Army. He did his schooling in Kendriya Vidyalaya and later joined the Karnataka State Cricket Association. His sister, Anita Pandey is also a former cricketer who represented Karnataka. He was a member of the victorious Indian team in the 2008 Under-19 World Cup held in Malaysia.

== Indian Premier League ==
He was selected for the Mumbai Indians squad in the 2008 season of the Indian Premier League. On 21 May 2009, while playing for Royal Challengers Bangalore, he became the first Indian to score a century in the IPL. He was then picked up by the Kolkata Knight Riders in 2014. In the finals, he played a match-winning innings of 94 against Kings XI Punjab and was awarded Man of Match. He had been included in the list of top 10 scorers of 2 IPL seasons, 2014 (401 runs in 16 matches) and in 2017 (396 runs in 13 matches). In 2018, he was picked up by Sunrisers Hyderabad for ₹11 crore. He was dropped for most of the season in IPL 2021, due to lack of form.

At the inaugural IPL Auction in 2008, Pandey was bought by Mumbai Indians for a base price of US$30,000. In 2009, Royal Challengers Bangalore picked Manish Pandey as their specialist middle order batsman. He was retained for the 2010 season for RCB. Later, Pandey played for Pune Warriors India in the IPL 2011, 2012, and 2013 seasons. In the IPL 2014, 2015, and 2016 seasons, Kolkata Knight Riders retained Manish Pandey for his stellar knocks in the group matches throughout the tournament in 2014. In 2018, Manish Pandey became one of the highest paid cricketers in the season. Sunrisers Hyderabad picked him up for US$1.35 million for the season. Pandey continued playing for Sunrisers Hyderabad until 2021.

Pandey was bought by the Lucknow Super Giants for ₹ 4.6 crores in the 2022 IPL Auction, by the Delhi Capitals for ₹ 2.4 crores in the 2023 IPL Auction, and by the Kolkata Knight Riders for the base price of ₹ 50 lakhs in the 2024 auction.

== Domestic career ==
Manish plays for Karnataka. He was named captain of the Karnataka team in the 2021 Syed Mushtaq Ali Trophy. He captains Karnataka team in various domestic tournaments.

== International career ==
Pandey made his One Day International (ODI) debut for India against Zimbabwe on 14 July 2015. He had a successful debut that included a 144-run partnership with Kedar Jadhav. Pandey joined Jadhav at the crease when India was struggling at 82 for the loss of 4 wickets and made his maiden half-century before being dismissed for 71 runs. He made his Twenty20 International debut for India on the same tour, on 17 July 2015. Pandey's break-out international innings, however, came six months later in Sydney. In January 2016, his unbeaten maiden ODI century helped India gun down Australia's 330 with two balls to spare and prevent a whitewash. He was selected in the ODI squad for the Australian tour in January 2016. In the final game at the Sydney Cricket Ground, he played a match-winning innings of 104*, helping India win its only match of the series.

He was selected as a replacement of Yuvraj Singh in 2016 World T20 for India. He was named in the 15-man squad for the Champions Trophy in June 2017. However, he injured himself during the IPL and missed out the ICC event for India. In June 2021, he was named in India's One Day International (ODI) and T20I squad for their series against Sri Lanka.

== Personal life ==
Pandey married an Indian actress Ashrita Shetty on 2 December 2019 in Mumbai.
