= Manikanth Kadri =

- Born: 28 May; Mangalore
- Occupations: Music director, singer
- Years active: 2006 – present

Manikanth Kadri is an Indian film score, soundtrack composer and singer. He has predominantly scored music for Kannada and Tulu as well as several Telugu, Malayalam, and Tamil films. He is the son of saxophonist Kadri Gopalnath.

== Career ==
Manikanth started out his career by composing for jingles and devotional albums. He also composed for a title track of a Malayalam tele-serial Annu Mazhayayirunnu and won the Kerala State Award for best music.

He released his first instrumental album called Dream Journey in the year 2001 and also tasted success. He also scored for background for an English feature film Tantric Journal.

His film musical career began with Smart City (Malayalam), at the age of 24. After this film, his major break through happened with the Kannada film Savari in 2009. He has scored music for various films in Kannada, Tulu, Telugu, Malayalam, and Tamil languages.

== Discography ==
Year	Film title	Score	Songs	Language	Notes
2006	Smart City	Yes	Yes	Malayalam	
2007	Chaurahen	Yes	Yes	Hindi	
2008	Mr. Garagasa	Yes	Yes	Kannada	
2008	Chandranilekkoru Vazhi	Yes	Yes	Malayalam	
2008	Ganesha	Yes	Yes	Kannada	
2008	Avakai Biryani	Yes	Yes	Telugu	
2009	Village Lo Vinayakudu	Yes	Yes	Telugu	
2009	Savaari	Yes	Yes	Kannada	
2009	Male Bille	Yes	Yes	Kannada	
2010	Prithvi	Yes	Yes	Kannada	
2010	Ijjodu	Yes	Yes	Kannada	
2010	Swayamvara	Yes	Yes	Kannada	
2011	Amayakudu	Yes	Yes	Telugu	
2011	Udhayan	Yes	Yes	Tamil	
2011	Maduve Mane	Yes	Yes	Kannada	
2012	Crazy Loka	Yes	Yes	Kannada	
2012	Orange	Yes	Yes	Malayalam	
2012	Fighters	Yes	Yes	Hindi	
2012	Radhala Ganda	Yes	Yes	Kannada	
2012	Nandeesha	Yes	No	Kannada	
2013	Ball Pen	Yes	Yes	Kannada	
2013	Cool Ganesha	Yes	Yes	Kannada	
2013	Manasunu Maaya Seyake	Yes	Yes	Telugu	
2014	Savaari 2	Yes	Yes	Kannada	
2014	Rang	Yes	Yes	Tulu	
2014	Chaali Polilu	Yes	No	Tulu	
2015	Rang Birangi	Yes	Yes	Kannada	
2015	Mosagaallaku Mosagaadu	Yes	Yes	Telugu	
2015	Jaathre	Yes	Yes	Kannada	
2015	Chandi Kori	Yes	No	Tulu	
2016	Run Anthony	Yes	Yes	Kannada	
2016	Shutterdulai	Yes	Yes	Tulu	
2016	Barsa	Yes	No	Tulu	
2016	Meena Bazar	Yes	Yes	Kannada	
2016	Mooka Hakki	Yes	Yes	Kannada	
2017	March 22	Yes	Yes	Kannada	
2017	Ambar Caterers	Yes	Yes	Tulu	
2017	Are Marler	Yes	No	Tulu	
2017	Esa	Yes	No	Tulu	
2018	Paddayi	Yes	No	Tulu	
2018	Pathis Gang	Yes	Yes	Tulu	
2018	Yera Ullerge	Yes	No	Tulu	
2018	Asathoma Sadgamaya	Yes	No	Kannada	
2018	Naduve Antaravirali	Yes	Yes	Kannada	
2018	Sri Bharatha Bahubali	Yes	Yes	Kannada	
2018	Takkar	Yes	Yes	Kannada	
2018	Deyi Baidethi	Yes	No	Tulu	
2018	Sagutha Doora Doora	Yes	Yes	Kannada	
2018	Raahukaala Guligakaala	Yes	Yes	Tulu	
2019	English	Yes	Yes	Tulu	
2019	Jabardasth Shankara	Yes	Yes	Tulu	
2019	Raanchi	Yes	Yes	Kannada	
2019	Gubbi Mele Brahmastra	Yes	Yes	Kannada	
2019	Ranganayaki	Yes	Yes	Kannada	
2021	Love You Rachchu	Yes	Yes	Kannada	
2022	Ombattane Dikku	Yes	Yes	Kannada	
2022	Melobba Maayaavi	Yes	No	Kannada	
2023	Mr. Bachelor	Yes	Yes	Kannada	
2023	Pentagon	Yes	Yes	Kannada	
2024	Lineman	Yes	Yes	Kannada; Telugu	
2024	Ronny	No	Yes	Kannada	
2026	Toss (2026 film)	Yes	Yes	Tulu	

== Television ==
- Station ID for COLORS SUPER Kannada
- Title song for CHAMPIONS COLORS SUPER Kannada
- Title song for Super minute 2 Kannada for COLORS Kannada
- Title song for Sriman shrimati for ZEE Kannada
- Title song for DANCING STARS 2 COLORS Kannada
- Title song for COLORS Anubandha Awards.
- Station ID for COLORS CINEMA Kannada
- Title song for THAKADHIMITHA COLORS Kannada
- Title song for MAADESHWARA for ZEE Kannada
- Title song for Lakshana for Colors Kannada

== Awards ==
- 2005 – Kerala State Television Award for Best Music- Annu Mazhayayirunnu
- 2009 – Mirchi music awards for best song of the year and song of the year listeners choice and best female singer for "SAVARI"
- 2010 – Best music director by Bangalore Music Academy "PRITHVI"
- 2014 – Zee Kannada awards for Ninna danigaagi song from savari 2 (Best lyrics, Best female singer and Best male singer)
- 2014 – Six mirchi music awards for ninna danigagi song (Best composer of the year, best album of the year, song of the year, song of the year listeners choice, best lyrics, best technical award for mix n master) for Savari 2
- 2014 – best music director award from chithra sante for Savari 2
- 2014 – Red Fm tulu film awards for best music director (RANG)
- 2014 – Red Fm tulu film awards for best background score (Chalipolilu)
- 2017 – Best album of the year for RUN ANTONY
- 2018 – TIMES KAFTA awards for best background score (March 22)
