= Nanban Oruvan Vantha Piragu =

- Theatrical release poster
- Directed by: Ananth Ram
- Written by: Ananth Ram; Rajesh V
- Produced by: Aishwarya. M; Sudha. R; Venkat Prabhu (Presenter)
- Starring: Ananth Ram; Bhavani Sre
- Cinematography: Tamil Selvan
- Edited by: Fenny Oliver
- Music by: AH Kaashif
- Production companies: Masala Popcorn; White Feather
- Distributed by: Sakthi Film Factory
- Release date: 2 August 2024
- Country: India
- Language: Tamil

Nanban Oruvan Vantha Piragu (transl. After A Friend Came, also marketed as NOVP) is a 2024 Indian Tamil-language coming-of-age buddy drama film directed by Ananth Ram, in his directorial debut and joinly produced by Masala Popcorn and White Feather. The film stars Ananth and Bhavani Sre in the lead roles, alongside RJ Vijay, Elango Kumaravel, Kulappulli Leela, Irfan (in his acting debut), Venkat Prabhu and Aishwarya. M. The film released on 2 August 2024 and opened to positive reviews from critics and audiences.

== Plot ==
Anand begins sharing his memories with a co-passenger on his flight to Chennai. Born in 1992, Anand moved to Anandam Colony with his family after his younger brother's birth. He befriends Aadhi's gang and frequently clashes with Lalith's gang. During an intra-school event, Anand faces humiliation when he faints on stage due to crowd phobia, allowing his rival group to win. In 2011, Anand wished to opt out of engineering and pursue a degree in Visual Communication at Loyola College. His father, Ravi, a former aspiring cricketer who played in the Ranji Trophy team in 1984, had his dreams shattered by poverty. He emphasizes the importance of education, encouraging Anand to pursue his passions after completing his studies.

Anand then joins Sri Muthulakshmi Engineering College, where he meets Kannamma from Delhi who boards at the same point for the college bus. Anand's struggles continue as he faints during a college seminar. However, he finds solace in his growing closeness with Kannamma. After completing their degree, Anand proposes an event management company, NOVP Events (formerly Infinity Events), to keep their friend group together. They agree to try this venture for a year before exploring other job opportunities. Anand also suggests developing an app called "Become a Star," but the project faces delays, and the loan they need is withheld. As a result, most of their friends lose hope and part ways to settle in their careers, leaving NOVP Events in limbo where Anand is left alone.

Anand's family struggles to make ends meet, and his father takes out loans with exorbitant interest rates. Anand's mother scolds him for being jobless, and he finds comfort in his friends. However, his grandmother slaps him when he gets angry in response to his mother's criticism. His friends, Srikanth and Praveen, humiliate him while Kannamma, advises him to find a job, to which Anand reluctantly agrees, but his father suggests pursuing a postgraduate degree instead and moving to Singapore, where his friend's son Krishna is working. During a gathering, Praveen humiliates Anand again, leading to a physical altercation with Aadhi. Praveen and Rajesh leave the friends group in anger. Anand feels distressed, believing he's a burden to his friends due to his joblessness, and emotionally thanks Aadhi for his support and leaves for Singapore.

There, Anand meets Madan and his roommate Lalith, a former rival but with Lalith's help, Anand completes the "Become a Star" app. In Delhi, Kannamma's father arranges her marriage to Ratheesh, while Anand feels avoided by Kannamma and confronts her during a phone call. Kannamma says she'll contact him when she's free, but marriage preparations continue. Aadhi consoles with Praveen, who reveals he was trying to motivate Anand to improve his life. Anand befriends Azhagar, an Ajith Kumar fan, and tests the app. Azhagar shares his struggles with homesickness, revealing he misses his family deeply. He passes away the next day, intoxicated. Azhagar's death profoundly impacts Anand, being his first experience with loss. Despite the "Become a Star" app's success and potential partnership with a multinational corporation, Anand declines the offer. He decides to return to India and utilize the app to revive NOVP Events.

Back in Chennai, Anand's friends reunite and join forces to organize their Annual Colony Event, using NOVP Events. Kannamma also joins them, reuniting with Anand. With renewed confidence, Anand exudes confidence on stage, orchestrating a seamless and triumphant event.

== Cast ==
- Ananth Ram as Anand
- Bhavani Sre as Kannamma
- Kumaravel as Ravi, Anand’s father
- Leela as Anand’s grandmother
- Diana Vishalini as Sumathi, Anand's mother
- RJ Vijay as Aadhi
- Irfan as Babu
- Wilspat as Rajesh
- Dev
- KPY Bala as Karthi
- Monica Chinnakotla as Shailu
- RJ Ananthi as Vidya
- Sabarish as Srikanth
- Guhan Prakash as Lalith
- Fenny Oliver as Anand’s Singapore friend
- Dharmaraj
- Vinoth GD as Azhagar
- Poovendhan
- Madan Gowri as Madhan
- Jerome Remigas
- Praveen as Praveen
- Renga Prasanth as Lalith’s friend
- Sai Venkatesh
- Thangadurai as college peon
- Aishwarya M. as Maya, HOD, C.Sc Department
- Venkat Prabhu as Anand’s co-passenger in flight (cameo appearance)

== Production ==
The film is the directorial debut for director Ananth Ram. The film is presented by Venkat Prabhu. The film was produced by Aishwarya . M and Sudha.R under the banner of Masala Popcorn In Association With White Feather Studios. The cinematography was done by Tamil Selvan while editing was handled by Fenny Oliver and music composed by AH Kaashif. The title of the film is derived from the lyrics of the song "Mustafa Mustafa" in Kadhal Desam (1996).

== Release ==
=== Theatrical ===
The film was released on 2 August 2024 in theatres.

=== Home media ===
The film began streaming on Aha Tamil from 14 September 2024.

== Critical reception ==
Avinash Ramachandran of The Indian Express rated the film three out of five stars and wrote that "This film is like going on a trip down memory lane, without anyone rushing us to reach our destination. The film talks about the importance of the journey, and how each path finds its own torchbearers when it has to". Harshini SV of The Times of India stated that "The viewing experience of the film feels like reading a personal journal within two hours" and gave three point five out of five.
