= Telikeda Bolli =

- Film poster
- Directed by: P. H. Vishwanath
- Screenplay by: Devadas Kapikad
- Produced by: Sudhir Kamath; Sharmila Kapikad
- Starring: Arjun Kapikad; Ashrita Shetty; Devadas Kapikad
- Cinematography: R Manjunath
- Music by: Gurukiran
- Production company: Central Cinemas
- Release date: 6 December 2012 (Mangalore)
- Country: India
- Language: Tulu

Telikeda Bolli is a 2012 Indian Tulu-language comedy film directed by P. H. Vishwanath and written by Devadas Kapikad. The film stars Arjun Kapikad and Ashrita Shetty in the lead roles along with Devadas Kapikad (in his Tulu acting debut), Naveen D. Padil, Aravind Bolar, Gopinath Bhat, Bhojaraj Vamanjoor, and Karnoor Mohan Rai. The movie, produced by Sudhir Kamath and Sharmila Kapikad under the banner of Central Cinemas, is released simultaneously at Mangaluru, Udupi, Karkala, Belthangady and Moodabidri on 6 December 2012.

== Cast ==
- Arjun Kapikad
- Ashrita Shetty
- Devadas Kapikad
- Naveen D. Padil
- Aravind Bolar
- Gopinath Bhat
- Bhojaraj Vamanjoor
- Sandeep Shetty
- Vaishali Shetty
- Sarojini Shetty
- Karnoor Mohan Rai

== Soundtrack ==
The soundtracks of the film was composed by Gurukiran. The audio launch was held on 8 November 2012 in Mangalore. The song "Swarga Nisarga" from the Kannada film Aarambha (2015) was reused from this film and was nominated for the Limca Book of Records for the world's first 'Ulta' (Reverse) song.
