= Grass Root Film Company =

Indian film production and distribution company

- Company type: Private; Film production
- Industry: Entertainment; Motion picture
- Founded: 2012
- Founder: Vetrimaaran; Aarthi
- Defunct: 2025
- Headquarters: Chennai, India
- Products: Films
- Owner: Vetrimaaran

Grass Root Film Company was an Indian film production and distribution company. Established by Indian director Vetrimaaran in 2012, it debuted with Udhayam NH4, produced in collaboration with Meeka Entertainment. The company has collaborated with Wunderbar Films on several other films. Committed in 2012, it has since gone to produce several Tamil language films. The company was closed after the release of their final venture, Bad Girl.

== Filmography ==
Year	Film	Notes
2013	Udhayam NH4	Co-produced by Meeka Entertainment
2014	Poriyaalan	
2015	Kaaka Muttai	National Film Award for Best Children's Film
2016	Visaranai	National Film Award for Best Feature Film in Tamil
2016	Kodi	
2018	Annanukku Jai	
2018	Vada Chennai	
2019	Miga Miga Avasaram	
2020	Baaram	Presenter
2021	Sangathalaivan	
2022	Pettaikaali	Web series
2023	Viduthalai Part 1	
2024	Garudan	
2024	Sir	Presenter
2024	Viduthalai Part 2	
2025	Bad Girl	
2025	Mask	Presenter
TBA	Manushi	
