= Crazy Loka =

- Film poster
- Directed by: Kavita Lankesh
- Written by: Duniya Soori
- Produced by: Confident Group
- Starring: Ravichandran; Daisy Bopanna; Harshika Poonacha
- Cinematography: A.C. Mahendran
- Edited by: Jony Harsha
- Music by: Manikanth Kadri
- Release date: 8 June 2012
- Country: India
- Language: Kannada

Crazy Loka (transl. Crazy world) is a 2012 Indian Kannada-language film starring V. Ravichandran and Daisy Bopanna. The film is directed by Kavita Lankesh and produced by Confident Group and Shanti Pictures. Manikanth Kadri is the music director for the film.

== Cast ==
- Ravichandran as Basavaraj Kattimane
- Daisy Bopanna as Sarala
- Bharathi Vishnuvardhan
- Harshika Poonachha as Chandini
- Vijay Suriya as Abhay
- Avinash as Ganapathi
- Neenasam Ashwath as Harihara
- Ramya as item number "Ghalabe Ghalabe"

== Soundtrack ==
Crazy Loka

Soundtrack album by Manikanth Kadri
- Released: 2012
- Recorded: 2012
- Genre: Feature film soundtrack
- Length: 23:26
- Language: Kannada

Official audio
- Crazy Loka - Full Album on YouTube

Music composer Manikanth Kadri has composed 7 songs. Actress Ramya has made a special appearance in the song "Ghalabe Ghalabe", performed by Chaitra H. G.

Track listing
| No. | Title | Singer(s) | Length |
|---|---|---|---|
| 1. | "Naavu Aaramagiddare" | Benny Dayal, Anitha Janani | 4:23 |
| 2. | "Kabab Me Haddi" | Tippu | 3:08 |
| 3. | "Ghalabe" | Chaitra H. G. | 3:31 |
| 4. | "Yele Yelege Chiguruva" | Aishwarya Majumdar, Rajesh Krishnan | 4:04 |
| 5. | "Dont Worry" | Aishwarya Majumdar, Manikanth Kadri, Hemanth, Shashank Sheshagiri | 4:16 |
| 6. | "Yele Yelege Chiguruva ( Solo)" | Vijay Prakash | 4:04 |
| Total length: | | | 23:26 |

== Reception ==
=== Critical response ===
A critic from The Times of India scored the film at 3.5 out of 5 stars and says "Ravichandran marvels as Basavaraja. Daisy Bopanna is smart. Avinash excels as an innocent college principal with excellent body language and dialogue delivery. Camera by AC Mahender is good. Music by Manikant Kadri is okay". Srikanth Srinivasa from Rediff.com scored the film at 3 out of 5 stars and wrote "Manikanth Kadri's music is average except for Daisy's song. A C Mahendran's camera work is adequate. Kavitha Lankesh has made a youthful film and has tried to include a message to the youth along with entertainment". A critic from The New Indian Express wrote "Ramya’s special song forces itself in the film and gives a temporary glitz. The punch in the script could have been more powerful. The effort by cameraman, AC Mahendra and music by Manikanth Khadri is average". A critic from Bangalore Mirror wrote "Avinash, as a fumbling principal, and Bharati Vishnuvardhan as his mother are the only two characters in the film which make you sit up and take note of the otherwise dull proceedings. And Ravichandran wears the worst wig since Rajkumari". S Viswanath from Deccan Herald wrote "With nothing working for it, be it a string of non-sensical songs, or crazier happenings, Crazy Loka is like a man with two left feet trying to entertain with his dance.Sorry Kavitha, it does not work despite your best of intentions".
