= Ka Pae Ranasingam =

2020 film by P. Virumaandi

- Release poster
- Directed by: P. Virumandi
- Written by: P. Virumandi
- Produced by: Kotapadi J Rajesh
- Starring: Vijay Sethupathi Aishwarya Rajesh
- Cinematography: N. K. Ekambaram
- Edited by: T. Sivanadeeswaran
- Music by: Ghibran
- Production company: KJR Studios
- Distributed by: Zee Studios; Zee Plex; ZEE5
- Release date: 2 October 2020
- Running time: 176 minutes
- Country: India
- Language: Tamil

Ka Pae Ranasingam (transl. Husband name: Ranasingam) (Note: The film's name is short for Kanavar Peyar Ranasingam.) is a 2020 Indian Tamil-language political drama film written and directed by P. Virumandi in his directorial debut. The film stars Vijay Sethupathi and Aishwarya Rajesh. Based on a true story, the film follows Ariyanachi (Aishwarya Rajesh), a poor woman who strives to bring her deceased husband's body back to India from Dubai, battling the odds of political agenda, corruption and a treacherous bureaucracy that stand in her way.

The film began production in June 2019, and was completed in October 2019, being extensively shot in Ramanathapuram and a few sequences in Hyderabad and Dubai. The film's music is composed by Ghibran and cinematography and editing were handled by N. K. Ekambaram and T. Sivanandeeshwaran.

Ka Pae Ranasingam was scheduled to release in the newly launched streaming service Zee Plex, bypassing a theatrical release due to the COVID-19 pandemic. It was released on 2 October 2020, coinciding with Gandhi Jayanti, and was dubbed and released in Malayalam, Telugu, Kannada and Hindi on 9 October 2020. It received positive response from critics praising Aishwarya Rajesh's performance.

== Plot ==
The film begins with Ariyanachi getting ready for her daughter's ear piercing function. It is shown that her husband Ranasingam lives in Dubai to support their family. As the function is happening, Maayi, Ranasingam's younger sister, learns that her brother died during a protest in Dubai through the police. As everyone is in shock and heartbroken, they try to bring Ranasingam's body back to India.

In a flashback, Ranasingam is revealed to be a water dowser. Ariyanachi's father Thirukannan hired Ranasingam for divining water on their land. Ariyanachi does not believe him and thinks he is a hoaxer who is tricking her family, whilst also trying to court her. One day when Ranasingam was passing by, Ariyanachi blocked him and asked him to show him where the water is as she believes that he is just making a magic show. He then identifies the water in the sky, saying that it will rain on her side but will not rain on his side. In disbelief, Ariyanachi stood and waited, but it happened, which started their love.

The film is taken back to the present, where their family is still trying to recover Ranasingam's body. Ariyanachi gets a call from Ranasingam's friends abroad, saying that he did not die during a protest but during an accident, while he was working in the oil factory. In shock, Ariyanachi decided to go to the police, where they do not believe her and ask her for evidence. Trying her best, she files a case in court, where they decided to tarnish Ranasingam's name and did not come with a decision.

Taken back to the past, it is shown that Ariyanachi and Ranasingam get engaged, but on the day of their wedding, the police decide to enforce a curfew to stop the wedding. They still managed to get married overnight but failed to get any evidence because it was sudden. Ariyanachi tells Ranasingam that she wants to build a house for the whole family to stay. Ranasingam is involved with people's problems and helps them solve them, but this is disliked by the police. As Ariyanachi struggles to bring her husband's body back, she decides to do everything she can. While everyone is at the airport to drop Ranasingam as he is going to Dubai for work, it is shown that Ariyanachi is pregnant. During their calls, he shows Ariyanachi that he got a tattoo of her name on his hand so when he shakes people's hands, the first thing they notice is her.

Ariyanachi decides to talk to the local MLA (Namo Narayana), Chief Minister of Tamil Nadu, and others, but nothing worked. 10 months passed, and then she decided to take matters into her own hands when she stood on top of a new dam, attempting suicide. This catches the attention of the Prime Minister of India (C. V. Kumar). Attempts are made to bring Ranasingam's body. Ariyanachi's family picks up the body from the airport, and the funeral arrangements are made. As they go to cremate the body, Ariyanachi finds out that the body is not Ranasingam's as it does not have the tattoo of her name, but she stays quiet. As Ariyanachi is talking to Ranasingam's photo, she asks for forgiveness as she could not bring his body back home.

At the end, Ranasingam's body is shown floating in the middle of the ocean as he did pass away due to an accident and his corpse was abandoned or thrown into the ocean.

== Cast ==
- Vijay Sethupathi as Ranasingam
- Aishwarya Rajesh as Ariyanachi Ranasingam
- Munishkanth as Ranasingam's friend
- Vela Ramamoorthy as Thirukannan, Ariyanachi's father
- Rangaraj Pandey as Thamizhkumaran, Collector of Ramanathapuram district
- Bhavani Sre as Maayi, Ranasingam's younger sister
- Poo Ramu as Ranasingam's father
- Abhishek Shankar as Government Official
- Mohan Raman as Judge
- Namo Narayana as Member of Tamil Nadu Legislative Assembly
- T. Siva as Registration officer
- Mathew Varghese as Dubai-based officer
- Hello Kandasamy as Police Constable
- Vazhakku En Muthuraman
- Thavasi as Village Priest
- Saravana Sakthi as Sangili
- Aruldass
- Arunraja Kamaraj as Gunasekhar
- C. V. Kumar as Prime Minister of India
- Shanoor Sana as Seetha Venkataraman, India's Minister for Defence
- Durai Sudhakar as President
- Nivas Adithan as Factory owner

== Production ==
The film began production with Aishwarya Rajesh in the lead role and was intended to be made on a shoestring budget; however, with the addition of actor Vijay Sethupathi to the cast, the scale of the film increased. Aishwarya and Sethupathi play a couple in the film. The film was launched in June 2019 and shooting was finished by October 2019. The film is a female centric film with Sethupathi's role having a duration of around forty minutes. Shooting for the film happened in Ramanathapuram for around forty-five days, with few sequences being shot at Hyderabad and Dubai.

== Soundtrack ==
The soundtrack album was composed by Ghibran and lyrics were written by Vairamuthu. All the songs in the film, were released as singles, before the film's album eventually released on 26 September 2020. The song "Thaarayadi Nee Enakku" is based on a poem written by Mahakavi Subramaniya Bharathiyar.

Ka Pae Ranasingam

Soundtrack album by M. Ghibran
- Released: 2020
- Studio: Aksharaa Sound Forge
- Length: 23:27
- Language: Tamil
- Labels: Lahari Music; T-Series
- Producer: M. Ghibran

M. Ghibran chronology
Dhanusu Raasi Neyargale (2019)	Ka Pae Ranasingam (2020)	Maara (2021)

No.	Title	Singer(s)	Length
1.	"Alagiya Sirukki"	Gold Devaraj	5:01
2.	"Punnagaiye"	Sundarayyar	5:28
3.	"Paravaigala"	Manikandan Perumpadappu	5:24
4.	"Thaarayadi Nee Enakkuu"	Gold Devaraj	1:11
5.	"Peru Ranasingam"	Bhadra Rajin	6:21
Total length:			23:27

== Release ==
Originally scheduled for a theatrical release in January 2020, Ka Pae Ranasingam was postponed due to post-production delays and the COVID-19 pandemic. In September 2020 Zee Studios acquired the distribution rights of the film and announced that the film will release on 2 October 2020 on Zee Plex, a new pay-per-view streaming service. Zee Plex announced the starting price of the film, where users have to pay ₹199 to watch the film. After the film was cleared by the Central Board of Film Certification, it was released in drive-in-theatres of Delhi and Bengaluru. It was also dubbed in Malayalam, Telugu, Kannada and Hindi with the same titled which were released on 9 October 2020.

The makers originally planned a theatrical release on 16 October 2020 following their reopening for first time after the pandemic, before the exhibitors and theatre owners declined to release the film, stating that they won't violate the guidelines of cinemas by releasing a film in theatres after its digital launch as well as the uncertainty prevailing in reopening theatres across Tamil Nadu which were eventually reopened in November 2020. The film was available for streaming on ZEE5 from 6 November 2020.

== Reception ==
On the review aggregator website Rotten Tomatoes, 83% of 6 critics' reviews are positive, with an average rating of 7/10.

M. Suganth of The Times of India gave the film a rating of 3 out of 5 stars and stated that "We understand that Ariyanachi's quest for justice is a long and weary one, but we wish director P Virumandi had found a way to narrate this take in a swifter fashion. But he goes for a long-winded approach and at almost three hours, the film is an exhausting watch." Karthik Kumar of Hindustan Times wrote that "By the time the film reaches the end and makes its point, as much as you want to laud the intent, you’re equally glad it’s over. The length is a major downer in what’s otherwise an important film". Ranjani Krishnakumar of Firstpost gave 4 out of 5 and stated "Ka Pae Ranasingam reminds us that resistance is an exhausting endeavour; they will not kill you, they will simply wear you down." Pradeep Kumar of The Hindu wrote "Despite its flaws, Ka Pae Ranasingam offers interesting commentary on State apathy. If you can gather enough patience to last its runtime in one sitting, and can also look past the shortcomings of its PPV host, Ka Pae Ranasingam can indeed be some experience."

The Indian Express, chief editor Manoj Kumar R, gave 4 out of 5 stars and stated "Aishwarya Rajesh is a revelation. She displays hopelessness, powerlessness, vulnerability, grit and determination with ease and impressive conviction. Vijay Sethupathi, as usual, brings charm to his turn as a well-read and emotionally well-balanced youth leader." Baradwaj Rangan of Film Companion stated "The film isn’t perfect. It could have used more polish — not necessarily in the making, but in the writing, the way the scenes are rounded off or the way some characters are introduced. But after a very long time, I had the satisfaction of watching a movie that was about something and yet not in a hurry to offer closure." Ashameera Aiyyapan of The New Indian Express stated "When you watch the film, you can see the conflict in the narrative. Ka Pae Ranasingam is essentially Ariyanachi’s story but the film focuses more on establishing who Ransingam is." A critic from Sify gave the film 4 out of 5 and stated "Watch it for the brilliant Aishwarya and the emotionally charged message." Sowmya Rajendran of The News Minute gave 3.5 out of 5 and stated "Vijay Sethupathi is one of the leads but it is Aishwarya Rajesh who shoulders the film."
