= Madha Yaanai Koottam =

2013 Indian film by Vikram Sugumaran

- Theatrical release poster
- Directed by: Vikram Sugumaran
- Written by: Vikram Sugumaran
- Produced by: G. V. Prakash Kumar; N. P. K. S. Logu; Go. Venkatesh
- Starring: Kathir; Vela Ramamoorthy; Oviya
- Cinematography: Ragul Dharuman
- Edited by: Kishore Te.
- Music by: N. R. Raghunanthan
- Production company: GV Prakash Kumar Productions
- Distributed by: JSK Film Corporation
- Release date: 25 December 2013
- Country: India
- Language: Tamil

Madha Yaanai Koottam (transl. Herd of musth elephants) is a 2013 Indian Tamil language drama thriller film written and directed by Vikram Sugumaran, a former assistant of Balu Mahendra and the dialogue writer of Aadukalam. The film, which is produced by G. V. Prakash Kumar, stars newcomer Kathir, along with Oviya. The film's soundtrack and background score were composed by N. R. Raghunanthan, while Ragul Dharuman and Kishore Te. handled cinematography and editing, respectively. The film released on 25 December 2013 and was a sleeper hit at the box office.

== Plot ==
The film revolves around the family of Jayakkodi Thevar, who has two wives. Jayakkodi is a respected landowner whose family has helped develop the village for generations. However, his first wife, Sevanamma, and her elder brother, Veera Thevar control the local gangs and are feared by the villagers. Despite being 25 years older and already having four sons, Veera married Sevanamma's daughter and has a son of age 12 with her. Jayakkodi prefers to live with his second wife and her children, Parthiban and Ammu. Because of her husband's preference for his second wife, Sevanamma dislikes the second wife and her children. Veera blames his brother-in-law's second wife and her children for destroying his sister's life, and he hates them, too. The only member of the first wife's family that accepts the second wife's family is Jayakkodi's drunkard eldest son Boologarasa. However, he is often powerless against his mother and maternal uncle. Jayakkodi's relatives also do not deal closely with his second family as his second wife is of lower caste.

Ponram is a newly rich person from the same village and caste as Jayakkodi, and he wants to replace Jayakkodi as the most respected person. After being outshone in temple donations, Ponram competes with Veera for land tender from the forest department. When Jayakkodi comes to the tender, Veera leaves it out of respect, but Jayakkodi loses it to Ponram. Ponram's younger brother insults Jayakkodi, and later that night, he is brutally killed by Veera and his sons. Jayakkodi goes to pay respects to Ponram's brother, and a fight erupts between Ponram and Parthi. Jayakkodi and Parthi are arrested. Veera comes to their aid by using a related lawyer and saves them without hassle. Ponram swears revenge on Jayakkodi's entire family.

Parthi develops affection for a Malayali girl named Ritu, whom he first meets at his sister's nursing college and later convinces her to stay at his house due to ragging issues at the college hostel. Jayakkodi arranges a wedding for Ammu with one of his relative's sons, but the relative backs out due to caste pressure from Veera. Jayakkodi arranges a grand wedding for Ammu with his caste groom from Tanjore. After the wedding, Ritu leaves to her hometown to pursue her master's degree, and she stays silent when Parthi confesses his love for her in the bus stop minutes before she leaves. Jayakkodi dies unexpectedly after a heart attack the next night. Veera's sons come with their cousins and take Jayakodi's body back to Sevanamma's house. Boologarasa invites his stepmother and half-siblings to pay their respects, but his uncle Veera threatens to have the entire village boycott the funeral if they attend. As a result, the second wife and her children are kept away from the rituals.

Boologarasa is guilt-suck that his stepmother and half-siblings are excluded from his father's funeral. He invites Parthi to the 16th day ritual in honor of their father. After initial procrastination, Parthi decides to attend the ritual. Boologarasa teases Veera's sons for not being able to do anything to stop him from bringing his brother to their home. Angered, Boologarasa's cousins attack him. This eventually escalates into a fight. As one of Veera's sons tries to stab Boologarasa, Parthi pushes him away, and the son lands on a sharp knife and dies. Parthi flees as his brother holds back his surviving cousins. In order to avenge his son's death, Veera and his surviving sons plan to kill him. Sevanamma initially understands that Parthi is not at fault and he did this to save her only son. She helps protect Parthi's mother and arranges for him to escape to Kerala. Parthi lives with Ritu's family for a few days but is forced to live on the streets after his stepmother's nephews track him down using info from Ponram.

Sevannamma, confronted by her brother, helps him lure Parthi out by poisoning Parthi's mother, who currently lives with her. This brings Parthi to his dead mother, and all rituals end. Immediately, Veera's sons and cousins lock Parthi inside the house and attack him, with the rest of the family waiting outside for one winner to come out. Despite being outnumbered by his cousins, Parthi defeats them. One of Veera's sons escapes and begs Veera to kill Parthi. Veera climbs the house and throws his sickle to Parthi's neck, and it fatally cuts Parthi. The entire family surrounds Parthi, who dies looking at Sevanamma. Veera and his sons are arrested for murder, and Sevanamma is shown crying while cleaning Parthi's blood.

== Cast ==
- Kathir as Parthiban
- Oviya as Ritu
- Vela Ramamoorthy as Veera Thevar
- Viji Chandrasekhar as Sevanamma
- Muruganji as Jayakkodi Thevar
- Vinitha as Ammu
- Kalaiyarasan as Boologarasa
- Sreejith Ravi as Ponram
- Anju as Deepa
- Virumandi as Seeraalan
- Jenish as Thennarasu
- Ilavarasan as Ilavarasu
- P. Gopalakrishnan
- Theni Mahalakshmi
- Vaigai Siva Vijay Thevar

== Production ==
After associating with Ravi K. Chandran for five years, Ragul Dharuman made his debut as an independent cinematographer in this film. The film started in March 2013 in Periyakulam, and the second schedule of shooting was underway in April.

== Soundtrack ==
Madha Yaanai Koottam

Soundtrack album by N. R. Raghunanthan
- Released: 19 December 2013
- Genre: Feature film soundtrack
- Length: 26:28
- Language: Tamil
- Label: Sony Music
- Producer: N. R. Raghunanthan

N. R. Raghunanthan chronology
Neerparavai (2012)	Madha Yaanai Koottam (2013)	Pulivaal (2014)

The soundtrack was composed by N. R. Raghunanthan. All lyrics were written by Yegathasi.

Track listing
No.	Title	Singer(s)	Length
1.	"Kona Kondakari"	G. V. Prakash Kumar	4:34
2.	"Unnai Vanangaatha"	Velmurugan	4:08
3.	"Kombu Oothi"	Pushpavanam Kuppusamy, Anand Aravindakshan, Vikram Sugumaran	4:02
4.	"Enga Pora"	Thanjai Selvi	4:04
5.	"Yaro Yaro"	Haricharan, Monali Thakur	5:05
6.	"Mukkulathu"	Thiruvudaiyan	4:35
Total length:			33:34

== Reception ==
The film received generally positive reviews from critics.

Rediff wrote "Vikram Sukumaran’s Madha Yaanai Koottam reveals in great detail the rites and rituals followed after death and how pride, anger and vengeance can only lead to senseless violence and death". Sify wrote, "Vikram Sugumaran has made a decent first film. He is a good writer." The Hindu wrote, "The film is hopelessly dark".
