= Ashrita Shetty =

Indian actress

- Born: 16 July 1993 (age 33)
- Occupations: Actor, model
- Years active: 2012–present
- Spouse: Manish Pandey (m. 2019)

Ashrita Shetty (born 16 July 1993) is an Indian actress who predominantly works in Tamil language films.

== Early life ==
Shetty was born on 16 July 1993 to a South Indian family from Karnataka. She hails from Mumbai and has studied finance.

== Career ==
In 2010, Shetty participated in a beauty contest organised by The Times of India, Clean & Clear Fresh Face. Competing in Mumbai, she won the event there and then went on to win it again at the national level, eventually becoming the face of the brand for a year. She made her film debut in 2012, with a Tulu film, Telikeda Bolli. During the time, she appeared in various other television commercials. This was when film directors Vetrimaaran and Manimaran approached her to play the lead role in their venture, Udhayam NH4. The film saw her play a Bangalore-based Tamil-speaking college girl, who elopes with the character played by Siddharth. She gained mixed reviews for her portrayal in the film, with a reviewer noting she could be a promising actress in the making. Sangeeta Devi from The Hindu said "Newcomer Ashrita Shetty shows promise and her capability of bringing to the screen the vulnerability and innocence of a 17/18-year-old makes her endearing. This girl has huge potential." She then signed the lead in the action adventure film Indrajith opposite Gautham Karthik.

== Personal life ==
Shetty married Indian cricketer Manish Pandey on 2 December 2019.

== Filmography ==
Year	Film	Role	Language	Notes
2012	Telikeda Bolli	Malli	Tulu	Debut
2013	Udhayam NH4	Rithika	Tamil	
2014	Oru Kanniyum Moonu Kalavaanikalum	Isabella	Tamil	
2017	Indrajith	Smitha	Tamil	
