= Belur Gopalkrishna =

Indian politician (born 1964)

Belur Gopalkrishna (born 1964) is an Indian politician from Karnataka. He is a three time Member of the Legislative Assembly from Sagar Assembly constituency in Shimoga district representing Indian National Congress. He won the 2023 Karnataka Legislative Assembly election.

He was Appointed as chairman for Karnataka State Forest Industries Corporation on 26 January 2024.

== Early life and education ==
Gopalkrishna is from Sagar. His father Keriyappa is a farmer. He completed his Pre University Course in 1982 at the Government PU College, Sagar. He is the nephew of Kagodu Thimmappa.

== Career ==
Gopalkrishna won from Sagar Assembly constituency representing Indian National Congress in the 2023 Karnataka Legislative Assembly election. He polled 88,988 votes and defeated his nearest rival, Hartalu Halappa of Bharatiya Janata Party by a margin of 16,022 votes. He has hopped parties in the past but managed to get the Congress nomination from Sagar Assembly constituency for the 2023 Karnataka Legislative Assembly election, despite opposition from the local Congress cadre, who demanded the nomination of former minister Kagodu Thimmappa's daughter Raja Nandini.

In 2004, he followed his mentor S. Bagarappa and joined Bharatiya Janata Party. He first won as an MLA representing Bharatiya Janata Party winning the 2004 Karnataka Legislative Assembly election defeating three time MLA and his uncle, Kagodu Thimmappa of Indian National Congress, by a margin of 15,173 votes. Later, he stayed back in BJP when Bangarappa left the party and retained the Sagar Assembly constituency for Bharatiya Janata Party in the 2008 Karnataka Legislative Assembly election as he polled 57,706 votes and defeated his nearest rival, Kagodu Thimmappa of Indian National Congress, by a narrow margin of 2,845 votes.

He was denied congress ticket in 2013 Elections later joined Janata Dal (Secular) and unsuccessfully contested on JD(S) ticket. He joined Indian National Congress in 2018.
