= Bharath Bopanna =

Indian film actor

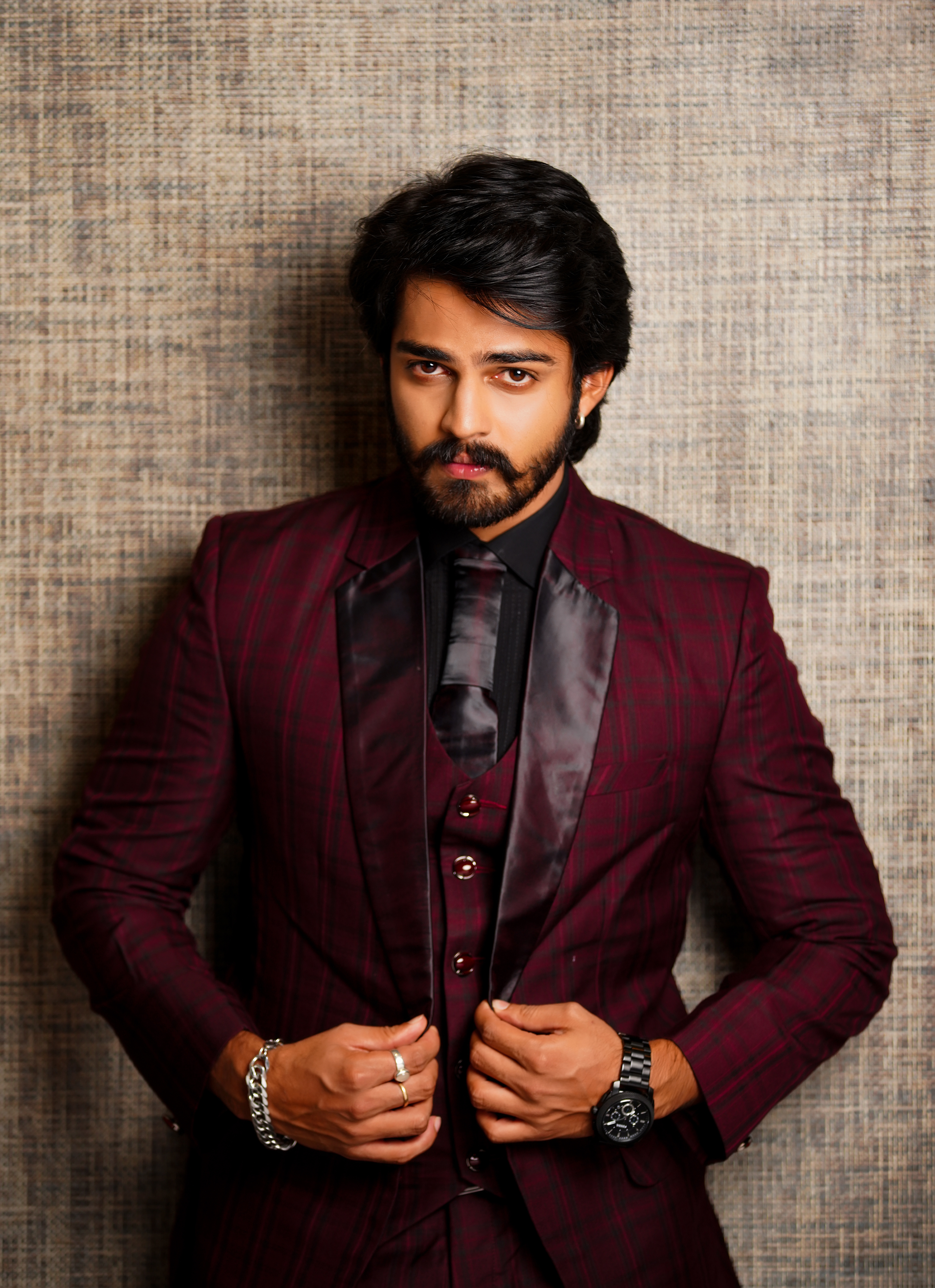
- Bharath Bopanna from 2025
- Born: 7 September 1992 (age 33); Madikeri, Kodagu District, Karnataka, India
- Education: Bachelor of Computer Application in SDM College of Business Management, Mangalore
- Occupation: Actor
- Years active: 2016–present

Bharath Bopanna (born 7 September 1992) is an Indian actor, who predominantly works in Kannada films, and also worked in Tamil and Malayalam films.

== Career ==
In 2016, Bharath made his television debut as a lead playing character "Rajavardhana", socio-mythological Kannada serial Girija kalyana directed by Naveen Krishna and produced by Arka Media Works the filmmakers of Baahubali: The Beginning and Baahubali 2: The Conclusion. He played the lead role "Lucky" as a Kabaddi champion in a popular tv show Bramhagantu. He contested in a celebrity dance reality show named "Dance Karnataka Dance" telecasted in Zee Kannada.

In 2020, He made his debut in Kannada cinema through Demo Piece. produced by Sparsha Rekha. In 2022, he played the role of Anand Sankeshwar, who is the son of legendary Vijay Sankeshwar, in the biopic Vijayanand.

He played the antagonist role Omar Quadri in the Tamil film Mission: Chapter 1 (2024) starring Arun Vijay and Amy Jackson directed by A. L. Vijay.

He received lot of appreciation for playing the role Ashish Bopanna(antagonist) in the Malayalam film Bromance (2025) which really did well in the box office.

He played a lead role in Vowels (2026) a Tamil-language romantic drama anthology film released on March 13, 2026, exploring five distinct shades of love—attraction, emotion, intimacy, obsession, and unconditional love.

== Filmography ==
Key
†	Denotes films that have not yet been released

• All the films are in Kannada language, unless otherwise noted.

Year	Title	Role	Language	Notes
2020	Demo Piece	Harsha	Kannada	
2022	Vijayanand	Anand Sankeshwar	Kannada	
2024	Mission: Chapter 1	Omar Quadri	Tamil	
2025	Bromance	Ashish Bopanna	Malayalam	
2026	Vowels	Ron	Tamil	Anthology film

== Television ==
Year	Title	Role	Channel
2016	Girija Kalyana	Rajavardhana	Colors Super
2017–2021	Brahmagantu	Lucky	Zee Kannada
