= Navalur railway station =

Railway station in Karnataka

Navalur

General information
- Location: Navalur, Dharwad-Hubli Highway, Dharwad district, Karnatak; India
- Coordinates: 15°24′56″N 75°03′20″E
- Elevation: 696 metres (2,283 ft)
- System: Indian Railways station
- Owner: Indian Railways
- Operator: South Western Railway zone
- Line: Guntakal–Vasco da Gama line
- Platforms: 2
- Tracks: Double Electric-Line

Construction
- Structure type: Standard (on ground)

Other information
- Status: Functional
- Station code: NVU
- Zone(s): South Western Railway zone
- Division(s): Hubballi

Services
Preceding station	Indian Railways	Following station
Amargol towards ?	South Western Railway zone Guntakal–Vasco da Gama section	Dharwad towards ?
Location
- Interactive map

Navalur railway station is a railway station located on the Guntakal–Vasco da Gama line operated by the South Western Railway zone under Hubballi railway division. It is situated beside Dharwad-Hubli Highway at Navalur in Dharwad district in the Indian state of Karnatak.
