= K. H. Sreenivasa =

Indian politician

K. H. Sreenivasa was a member of the legislative assembly (1967–1971) from the Sagara constituency of Karnataka state, Bangalore. Veerendra Patil was then Chief Minister of Karnataka.
