= Raktha Gulabi =

Indian Kannada-language film by Rabi Machinekad

- Film poster
- Directed by: Rabi Machinekad
- Written by: Rabi Machinekad
- Produced by: Machinekad Films
- Starring: Vikramadithya; Shivani
- Cinematography: Raavanan
- Edited by: Musasizi Paul
- Music by: Prajoth D’Sa
- Release date: 5 March 2021
- Running time: 132 minutes
- Country: India
- Language: Kannada
- Budget: ₹22 lakh

Raktha Gulabi (transl. Blood rose) is a 2021 Indian Kannada-language film written and directed by Rabi Machinekad, and produced by Machinekad Films. It stars Vikramadithya and Shivani. The supporting cast includes Maanika Gn, Ramu, Bharath Raj and Vinod Kumar. Prajoth D’Sa composed the music and the cinematography is by Raavanan. Raktha Gulabi is the first film to enter the Limca Book of Records and Asia Book of Records for being shot in a single take; the film was shot in two hours and eight minutes in a single take without any cuts.

== Cast ==
- Vikramadithya
- Shivani
- Maanikya GN
- Ramu
- Bharath Raj
- Vinod Kumar
- Lohit Kulkarni
- Praveen B Balagoudar
- Megh Raj

== Production ==
The film was shot in Arehalli and Bellavara in Sakleshpur taluk.

== Soundtrack ==
The film's background score and soundtracks are composed by Prajoth D’Sa. The music rights were acquired by Silly Monks Music.

Track listing
No.	Title	Lyrics	Singer(s)	Length
1.	"Kaarembo"	Rabi Machinekad	Prasanna Kumar MS	1:40
2.	"Vismaya Hennu"	Rabi Machinekad	Prasanna Kumar MS	1:41
3.	"Beesu Gaalige"	Praveen Kumar Jappinamogaru	Sparsha RK	4:15

== Reception ==
Writing in The Times of India, Sunayana Suresh stated "Given that this is a thriller, the fact that it has been shot in a single take slows down the pace in a big manner. The performances in such an effort need to be top notch, but they end up being a far cry from that. While the director seems to have done his homework and his ambition and effort need to be applauded, one wishes the end product was up to that grand idea." A critic from Vijayavani felt the film tested the patience of the viewer while applauding its unique one shot attempt.
