= Vijayanand (film) =

2022 Indian Kannada-language biopic film

- Directed by: Rishika Sharma
- Produced by: Dr Anand Sankeshwar
- Starring: Nihal; Siri Prahlad; Archana Kottige; Bharath Bopanna
- Cinematography: Keertan Poojary
- Edited by: Hemanth Kumar D
- Music by: Gopi Sundar
- Production company: VRL Film productions
- Release date: December 9, 2022
- Country: India
- Language: Kannada

Vijayanand is a 2022 Indian Kannada-language biographical film directed by Rishika Sharma, produced by Dr. Anand Sankeshwar under the banner of VRL Film productions a unit of VRL Media Pvt Ltd. The film is based on the life of Indian businessman, Vijay Sankeshwar. The film stars Nihal, Bharath Bopanna, Anant Nag, Ravichandran, Prakash Belawadi, Anish Kuruvilla, Vinaya Prasad and Siri Prahlad. The music is composed by Gopi Sundar.

== Cast ==
- Nihal as Vijay Sankeshwar
- Bharath Bopanna as Anand Sankeshwar
- Anant Nag as BG Sankeshwar
- Ravichandran as Ganesh Dada
- Prakash Belawadi
- Anish Kuruvilla as AJ
- Vinaya Prasad as Chandramma
- Siri Prahlad as Lalitha Sankeshwar
- Archana Kottige as Vani Sankeshwar

== Production ==
Film was shot at various locations like Hubli, Dharwad, Gadag, Agadi Thota Konnur, RFC Hyderabad, Bangalore, Udupi, Kudremukh, BabaBudangiri, Halebidu, Melkote. The shooting began in October 2021. The movie's theatrical release is planned in November 2022 in Kannada, Hindi, Telugu, Tamil and Malayalam languages. Vijayanand movie is the first ever biopic from the Kannada Film Industry dubbed into other South Indian and Hindi languages.

Filming for Vijayanand started on 24 October 2021 in Hubli, with a grand muhurat puja ceremony in the presence of the entire Karnataka press. As of December 2021, the team completed 80% of the shoot. With the schedule being filmed in Hubli. A straight continuous schedule of 75 days was completed. The last leg of the shoot was held in Hubli after the song sequences were shot at Kudremukh, Kapu beach, etc. The total number of shoot days is 98 days, The film has more than 66 sets (art sets raised) and the total number of artists was 245 with the background artists exceeding 5000.

== Music ==
The film's music is composed by music director Gopi Sundar. The music album rights are owned by Anand Audio, an Indian music record label company in Karnataka.
