= Sagar, Karnataka Assembly constituency =

Legislative assembly constituency

Coordinates: 14.16°N 75.03°E

Sagar
- Constituency No. 117 for the Karnataka Legislative Assembly

Constituency details
- Country: India
- Region: South India
- State: Karnataka
- District: Shimoga
- Lok Sabha constituency: Shimoga
- Established: 1956
- Total electors: 205,262
- Reservation: None

Member of Legislative Assembly
- 16th Karnataka Legislative Assembly
- Incumbent Belur Gopalkrishna
- Party: Indian National Congress
- Elected year: 2023
- Preceded by: Hartalu Halappa

Sagar Assembly constituency is one of the seats in Karnataka Legislative Assembly in India. It is part of Shimoga Lok Sabha constituency.

== Members of the Legislative Assembly ==
Election	Member	Party
1957	D. Mookappa	Indian National Congress
1962	V. S. Laxmikanthappa	Indian National Congress
1967	K. H. Sreenivasa	Indian National Congress
1972	Kagodu Thimmappa	Samyukta Socialist Party
1978	L. T. Toimmappa Hegde	Indian National Congress
1983	L. T. Toimmappa Hegde	Indian National Congress
1985	B. Dharmappa	Janata Party
1989	Kagodu Thimmappa	Indian National Congress
1994	Kagodu Thimmappa	Indian National Congress
1999	Kagodu Thimmappa	Indian National Congress
2004	Belur Gopalkrishna	Bharatiya Janata Party
2008	Belur Gopalkrishna	Bharatiya Janata Party
2013	Kagodu Thimmappa	Indian National Congress
2018	Hartalu Halappa	Bharatiya Janata Party
2023	Belur Gopalkrishna	Indian National Congress

== Election results ==
=== Assembly Election 2023 ===
2023 Karnataka Legislative Assembly election : Sagar
Party	Candidate	Votes	%	±%
INC	Belur Gopalkrishna	88,988	53.46%	▲8.00
BJP	H. Halappa Harathalu	72,966	43.83%	▼6.82
NOTA	None of the above	1,363	0.82%	▼0.16
AAP	K. Diwakara	1,040	0.62%	New
Margin of victory		16,022	9.62%	▲4.43
Turnout		166,739	81.23%	▲1.31
Total valid votes		166,465		
Registered electors		205,262		▲5.87
INC gain from BJP		Swing	▲2.81	

=== Assembly Election 2018 ===
2018 Karnataka Legislative Assembly election : Sagar
Party	Candidate	Votes	%	±%
BJP	Hartalu Halappa	78,475	50.65%	▲47.03
INC	Kagodu Thimmappa	70,436	45.46%	▼3.13
JD(S)	M. B. Girishgowda	2,100	1.36%	▼14.32
NOTA	None of the above	1,511	0.98%	New
Margin of victory		8,039	5.19%	▼22.66
Turnout		154,955	79.92%	▲3.46
Total valid votes		154,944		
Registered electors		193,884		▲7.84
BJP gain from INC		Swing	▲2.06	

=== Assembly Election 2013 ===
2013 Karnataka Legislative Assembly election : Sagar
Party	Candidate	Votes	%	±%
INC	Kagodu Thimmappa	71,960	48.59%	▲4.27
KJP	B. R. Jayanth	30,712	20.74%	New
JD(S)	Belur Gopalkrishna	23,217	15.68%	▲11.48
BJP	Sharavathi. C. Rao	5,355	3.62%	▼42.99
LSP	T. R. Krishnappa	2,302	1.55%	New
Independent	Suresha. C	1,385	0.94%	New
Margin of victory		41,248	27.85%	▲25.55
Turnout		137,477	76.46%	▲6.06
Total valid votes		148,090		
Registered electors		179,794		▲2.15
INC gain from BJP		Swing	▲1.98	

=== Assembly Election 2008 ===
2008 Karnataka Legislative Assembly election : Sagar
Party	Candidate	Votes	%	±%
BJP	Belur Gopalkrishna	57,706	46.61%	▼7.53
INC	Kagodu Thimmappa	54,861	44.32%	▲4.32
JD(S)	K. M. Krishnamurthy	5,204	4.20%	▲2.71
Independent	U. H. Ramappa	3,596	2.90%	New
BSP	H. S. Manjunatha	990	0.80%	New
Margin of victory		2,845	2.30%	▼11.84
Turnout		123,909	70.40%	▼2.24
Total valid votes		123,794		
Registered electors		176,006		▲20.33
BJP hold		Swing	▼7.53	

=== Assembly Election 2004 ===
2004 Karnataka Legislative Assembly election : Sagar
Party	Candidate	Votes	%	±%
BJP	Belur Gopalkrishna	57,455	54.14%	▲19.94
INC	Kagodu Thimmappa	42,448	40.00%	▼13.07
JP	K. Arun Prasad	3,401	3.20%	New
JD(S)	Narayana Rao. H	1,581	1.49%	▼1.34
Kannada Nadu Party	Indira Mohan Heggde	1,242	1.17%	New
Margin of victory		15,007	14.14%	▼4.74
Turnout		106,245	72.64%	▼3.00
Total valid votes		106,127		
Registered electors		146,264		▲12.16
BJP gain from INC		Swing	▲1.07	

=== Assembly Election 1999 ===
1999 Karnataka Legislative Assembly election : Sagar
Party	Candidate	Votes	%	±%
INC	Kagodu Thimmappa	50,797	53.07%	▲17.88
BJP	L. T. Toimmappa Hegde	32,730	34.20%	▲19.62
Independent	K. Arun Prasad	9,263	9.68%	New
JD(S)	B. R. Jayanth	2,704	2.83%	New
Margin of victory		18,067	18.88%	▲8.83
Turnout		98,638	75.64%	▲1.75
Total valid votes		95,715		
Rejected ballots		2,881	2.92%	▲1.28
Registered electors		130,403		▲3.31
INC hold		Swing	▲17.88	

=== Assembly Election 1994 ===
1994 Karnataka Legislative Assembly election : Sagar
Party	Candidate	Votes	%	±%
INC	Kagodu Thimmappa	32,271	35.19%	▼20.38
JD	H. V. Chandrashekar	23,059	25.15%	▼4.75
INC	S. Bangarappa	21,161	23.08%	New
BJP	U. H. Ramappa	13,374	14.58%	▲6.98
KRRS	H. B. Raju	1,061	1.16%	New
Margin of victory		9,212	10.05%	▼15.62
Turnout		93,265	73.89%	▲0.42
Total valid votes		91,699		
Rejected ballots		1,531	1.64%	▼2.87
Registered electors		126,225		▲6.44
INC hold		Swing	▼20.38	

=== Assembly Election 1989 ===
1989 Karnataka Legislative Assembly election : Sagar
Party	Candidate	Votes	%	±%
INC	Kagodu Thimmappa	46,234	55.57%	▲8.37
JD	B. R. Jayanth	24,876	29.90%	New
BJP	Shreedhara	6,327	7.60%	New
Independent	Bheemaneri Shivappa	4,203	5.05%	New
JP	Sudheendra Rao	881	1.06%	New
Kranti Sabha	H. B. Devappa	684	0.82%	New
Margin of victory		21,358	25.67%	▲23.15
Turnout		87,135	73.47%	▲6.37
Total valid votes		83,205		
Rejected ballots		3,930	4.51%	▲3.05
Registered electors		118,593		▲27.60
INC gain from JP		Swing	▲5.84	

=== Assembly Election 1985 ===
1985 Karnataka Legislative Assembly election : Sagar
Party	Candidate	Votes	%	±%
JP	B. Dharmappa	30,558	49.73%	▲15.56
INC	L. T. Thimmappa	29,008	47.20%	▲10.07
Independent	T. N. Srinivasa	1,252	2.04%	New
Independent	H. Ganapathiyappa	634	1.03%	New
Margin of victory		1,550	2.52%	▼0.44
Turnout		62,365	67.10%	▼0.88
Total valid votes		61,452		
Rejected ballots		913	1.46%	▼0.60
Registered electors		92,942		▲9.95
JP gain from INC		Swing	▲12.60	

=== Assembly Election 1983 ===
1983 Karnataka Legislative Assembly election : Sagar
Party	Candidate	Votes	%	±%
INC	L. T. Toimmappa Hegde	20,895	37.13%	New
JP	K. G. Shivappa	19,229	34.17%	▼13.56
BJP	U. L. Subashchandra	7,478	13.29%	New
Independent	B. R. Jayanth	7,356	13.07%	New
LKD	H. Ganapathiyappa	1,322	2.35%	New
Margin of victory		1,666	2.96%	▼1.58
Turnout		57,462	67.98%	▼12.35
Total valid votes		56,280		
Rejected ballots		1,182	2.06%	▼0.20
Registered electors		84,531		▲12.25
INC gain from INC(I)		Swing	▼15.14	

=== Assembly Election 1978 ===
1978 Karnataka Legislative Assembly election : Sagar
Party	Candidate	Votes	%	±%
INC(I)	L. T. Toimmappa Hegde	30,903	52.27%	New
JP	Kagodu Thimmappa	28,220	47.73%	New
Margin of victory		2,683	4.54%	▼13.51
Turnout		60,492	80.33%	▲10.18
Total valid votes		59,123		
Rejected ballots		1,369	2.26%	▲2.26
Registered electors		75,308		▲78.12
INC(I) gain from SSP		Swing	▼5.47	

=== Assembly Election 1972 ===
1972 Mysore State Legislative Assembly election : Sagar
Party	Candidate	Votes	%	±%
SSP	Kagodu Thimmappa	16,694	57.74%	New
INC	L. T. Toimmappa Hegde	11,477	39.70%	▼8.18
Independent	H. Ganapathiyappa	472	1.63%	New
Independent	S. Venkappa Kashhaiah	267	0.92%	New
Margin of victory		5,217	18.05%	▲15.03
Turnout		29,660	70.15%	▲4.60
Total valid votes		28,910		
Registered electors		42,279		▲6.64
SSP gain from INC		Swing	▲9.86	

=== Assembly Election 1967 ===
1967 Mysore State Legislative Assembly election : Sagar
Party	Candidate	Votes	%	±%
INC	K. H. Sreenivasa	11,860	47.88%	▼3.95
SSP	Kagodu Thimmappa	11,111	44.86%	New
ABJS	M. Ganapathi	1,797	7.26%	New
Margin of victory		749	3.02%	▼5.18
Turnout		25,990	65.55%	▲10.37
Total valid votes		24,768		
Registered electors		39,647		▼49.94
INC hold		Swing	▼3.95	

=== Assembly Election 1962 ===
1962 Mysore State Legislative Assembly election : Sagar
Party	Candidate	Votes	%	±%
INC	V. S. Laxmikanthappa	20,854	51.83%	▼2.64
Socialist Party (India)	Kagodu Thimmappa	17,555	43.63%	New
PSP	H. S. Hasan	1,824	4.53%	▼4.92
Margin of victory		3,299	8.20%	▼10.19
Turnout		43,699	55.18%	▲1.09
Total valid votes		40,233		
Registered electors		79,194		▲41.65
INC hold		Swing	▼2.64	

=== Assembly Election 1957 ===
1957 Mysore State Legislative Assembly election : Sagar
Party	Candidate	Votes	%	±%
INC	D. Mookappa	16,473	54.47%	New
Independent	Mariyappa	10,911	36.08%	New
PSP	D. P. Wodayar	2,858	9.45%	New
Margin of victory		5,562	18.39%	
Turnout		30,242	54.09%	
Total valid votes		30,242		
Registered electors		55,909		
INC win (new seat)				

== See also ==
- List of constituencies of Karnataka Legislative Assembly
- Hosanagar Assembly constituency
