= VRL Group =

Indian logistics, travel and transport company

VRL Logistics Limited
- Type: Transportation and Logistics
- Traded as: BSE: 539118; NSE: VRLLOG
- Founded: 1976; 50 years ago in Gadag, Karnataka, India
- Founder: Vijay Sankeshwar
- Headquarters: Hubballi, Karnataka, India
- Area served: India
- Key people: Vijay Sankeshwar, Anand Sankeshwar; Chairman & Managing Director
- Revenue: ▲₹2,909 crore (US$300 million) (2024)
- Operating income: ▼₹120 crore (US$12 million) (2024)
- Net income: ▼₹89 crore (US$9.2 million) (2024)
- Total assets: ▲₹2,214 crore (US$230 million) (2024)
- Total equity: ▼₹946 crore (US$98 million) (2024)
- Owner: Vijay Sankeshwar
- Website: www.vrlgroup.in

VRL Logistics Limited (formerly Vijayanand Roadlines Ltd.), commonly known as the VRL Group, is an Indian conglomerate headquartered in Hubballi, Karnataka, India with operations in around 23 states and 4 union territories in the country. Business operations of VRL Group include road transportation, logistics, publishing, etc.

VRL Group is one of the largest logistics and transport companies in India (incl.4360 vehicles, comprising 419 tourist buses and 3941 transport goods vehicles). The Limca Book of Records, states it is the single largest fleet owner of commercial vehicles in the country's private sector.

VRL's Vijayavani is credited with having the largest newspaper circulation in Karnataka.

== History ==
VRL Group was founded by Vijay Sankeshwar in 1976 at Gadag, Karnataka, India. His family had a publication house, which later became a part of the VRL Group.

== Headquarters and offices ==
VRL is headquartered in Hubballi, Karnataka and has 931 branches, 40 hubs and transport yards across the country. The headquarters has an effluent treatment plant (capacity:175 thousand liters), a rainwater harvesting plant, a petrol bunk (allotted by Indian Oil Corporation), and a garage service complex, where VRL’s trucks pass through once in every two weeks.

== Services ==
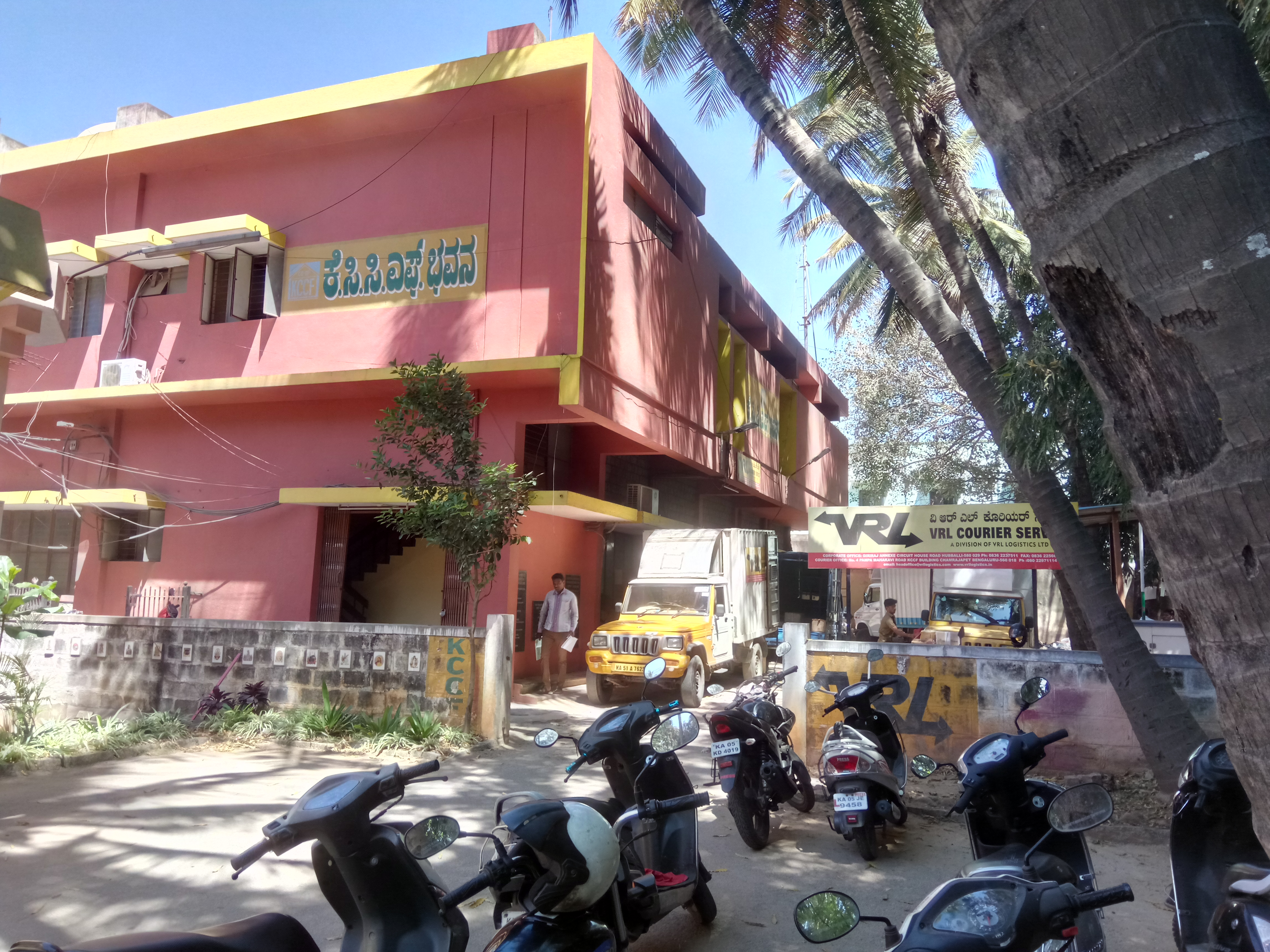
VRL Courier Services near Pampa Mahakavi road, Chamrajpet, Bengaluru.

=== Cargo and Courier ===
A subsidiary of VRL Group, VRL General Cargo started its business service with transportation between Hubballi and Gadag, and later spread across to Bengaluru and Belagavi. It has extended into courier services and express cargo, which are now operative in 23 states, handling over 216 million pieces of cargo/year, being one of the largest networks in the country. Its courier services are in operation for parcels ranging from small to large size.

=== Travel ===
VRL's public tour business is operated by its division Vijayanand Travels. With more than 80 branches and operated by 1000+ agents, it is the largest in tour business services in Karnataka and Maharashtra. It owns 1,550 buses (incl. 742 Volvo buses of 9400 XL and 9400PX multi-axle models), covering six states, moving across 350 routes in the country.

=== Aviation logistics ===
VRL Logistics Ltd. in 2008, started working in Indian Air Chartering Industry, operating under the Indian Air Operator permit (for passenger charter). In the first phase of its business, it owned a Beechcraft Premier I, an aircraft, manufactured by Hawker Beechcraft Inc, United States, while in 2013 it purchased another. It offers Jet aircraft charters to sectors like corporate, leisure and tourism, special missions, event management, advertisement agencies and for flights (VIP category).

=== Media ===
VRL Group's flagship entity, Vijayavani was started on 1 April 2011, which is now the largest circulated newspaper in Karnataka. VRL Group's subsidiary company VRL Media Ltd., prints Vijayavani and is published in 9 cities of the state. Vijayavani’s lead editor of its editorial division is Chennegowder and Subhash hoogar. Karnataka's second largest circulated newspaper Vijaya Karnataka, was started by Vijay Sankeshwar (of VRL Group) in October 2000, and was sold to the Times group on 16 June 2006.

In April 2017, VRL Media Ltd. started Dighvijaya News 24x7, a Kannada television news channel.

== In popular culture ==
Vijayanand, a 2022 Indian Kannada-language biographical film directed by Rishika Sharma, produced by Dr. Anand Sankeshwar, talks about the history of VRL group.

== See also ==
- Courier in India
- Indian Postal Service
- Blue Dart Express, a courier service in India
- DTDC, a courier service in India
- Ekart, a courier service in India
