= Demo Piece =

- Release poster
- Directed by: Vivek A.
- Produced by: Sparsha Rekha; AR Yashwanth
- Starring: Bharath Bopanna; Sonal Monteiro; Sparsha Rekha
- Music by: Arjun Ramu
- Production company: Rekha Movies
- Release date: 14 February 2020
- Country: India
- Language: Kannada

Demo Piece is a 2020 Indian Kannada-language comedy drama directed by Vivek A. and starring Bharath Bopanna, Sonal Monteiro and Sparsha Rekha (the film's producer).

== Cast ==
- Bharath Bopanna as Harsha
- Sonal Monteiro as Aadya
- Sparsha Rekha as Harsha's mother
- Chandrachud
- Rockline Sudhakar
- Seema

== Soundtrack ==
No.	Title	Lyrics	Singer(s)	Length
1.	"Darlingu"	Nagarjun Sharma	Sanjith Hegde, Asha Bhat
2.	"Navinge Jolly Urkollor Urkolli"		Chandan Shetty
3.	"Ontiyaagi Saagide Payana"		Rajesh Krishnan

== Reception ==
A critic from The Times of India wrote that "Demo Piece can be a one-time watch if you like college capers or dramas that run high on family sentiment and have a message too". A critic from The New Indian Express wrote that "It almost appears that the director considers the film a ‘demo piece’, a product that he wants to try and test on the viewers". A critic from The News Minute wrote that "Demo Piece, with the mindless plot, is a painful watch".
