= Vowels (film) =

- Theatrical release poster
- Directed by: Dhilip Kumar; Hemanth Kumar; Sangeeth; Santhosh Ravi; Jagan Rajendran
- Produced by: Raju Sheregar
- Starring: Yugi Sethu; Chinni Jayanth; Raj Ayyappa; Samyuktha Viswanathan; Nandu; Deepak Paramesh; Kajal Choudhary; Peter K Sharath Ravi; Akshitha Bopaiah; Hemanth Kumar; Priyanka Chandrashekar; Bharath Bopanna; Vijetha Vashitha
- Cinematography: Keerthan Poojaary; Sandeep Alluri
- Edited by: Harish Komme; Hemanth Kumar (Reload)
- Music by: Sarvanaa Subramaniam
- Production company: Riddhi Siddhi Films
- Distributed by: Uthraa Productions
- Release date: 19 March 2026
- Country: India
- Language: Tamil

Vowels – An Atlas of Love is a 2026 Indian Tamil-language romantic anthology drama film directed by Dhilip Kumar, Sangeeth, Hemanth Kumar, Santhosh Ravi and Jagan Rajendran. The film is distributed by Uthraa Productions. It stars Yugi Sethu, Chinni Jayanth, Raj Ayyappa, Samyuktha Viswanathan, Nandu, Deepak Paramesh, Kajal Choudhary, Peter K, Sharath Ravi, Akshitha Bopaiah, Priyanka Chandrashekar, Bharath Bopanna and Vijetha Vashitha. The film was theatrically released on 19 March 2026.

== Cast ==
Mars il Oru Azhagi by Sangeeth	Eros by Dhilip Kumar	Varnajaalam by Santhosh Ravi	Meendum Oru Payanam by Jagan Rajendran	Reload by Hemanth Kumar
	Yugi Sethu as Eros; Chinni Jayanth as Gopal	Samyuktha Viswanathan as Ashwathi; Deepak Paramesh as Kamal		

- Raj Ayyappa as Karthik
- Kajal Choudhary as Nakshatra
- Akshitha Bopaiah as Aishwarya
- Nandu as Martin
- Priyanka Chandrashekar
- Bharath Bopanna as Ron
- Vijetha Vashitha as Sara
- Sharath Ravi as Doctor
- Peter K as Markandeyan
- Hemanth Kumar
- Arul Kumar

== Production ==
The film is produced by Raju Sheregar under the banner Riddhi Siddhi Films. Cinematography is handled by Keerthan Poojaary and Sandeep Alluri, while editing is done by Harish Komme. The music for the film is composed by Saravana Subramaniam. Each story in the anthology film is based on a different emotion that starts with a vowel: A – Attraction, E – Emotion, I – Intimacy, O – Obsession, and U – Unconditional.

At the film's pressmeet, Yugi Sethu compared a trailer to a miniskirt, which received mixed reactions from netizens.

== Soundtrack ==
The soundtrack was composed by Sarvanaa Subramaniam, with lyrics written by Madura Kavi, Madhan Kumar V, Prakash Savariappa, and Deepak Chander. The audio rights were acquired by New Music India.

Track listing
No.	Title	Singer(s)	Length
1.	"Eera Kaatru"	Mano, Midhu Vincent	5:27
2.	"Movie Kaara"	Ramya Ram C	3:48
3.	"Saga Saga"	Ramya Ram C	5:33
4.	"Shoot Again Baby"	Vasundara Das	5:02
5.	"Sollamale En Kaadal"	Arvind Mukundan	4:02
6.	"Vaa Endan Nenjame"	Pavithra Chari	4:04
7.	"Vaan Midhandu Varum"	Sathya Prakash	5:00

== Reception ==
Abhinav Subramanian of The Times of India rate the film two out of five stars and wrote, "The deeper issue is that five directors sharing one music director and one editor produces a film that sounds and feels the same throughout. Song montages pad every segment, stretched out as though lingering on a moment long enough will give it meaning". Jayabhuvaneshwari B of Cinema Express gave the film the same rating and wrote, "some films feel like fragments rather than full sentences, while others go in circles when a straight line would have more than sufficed".
