= Amargol railway station =

Railway station in Karnataka

Amargol

General information
- Location: Amargol, Hubli, Dharwad district, Karnatak; India
- Coordinates: 15°24′42″N 75°05′54″E
- Elevation: 622 metres (2,041 ft)
- System: Indian Railways station
- Owner: Indian Railways
- Operator: South Western Railway zone
- Line: Guntakal–Vasco da Gama line
- Platforms: 1
- Tracks: Double Electric-Line

Construction
- Structure type: Standard (on ground)

Other information
- Status: Abandoned
- Station code: AGL
- Zone(s): South Western Railway zone
- Division(s): Hubballi

Services
Preceding station	Indian Railways	Following station
Unkal towards ?	South Western Railway zone Guntakal–Vasco da Gama section	Navalur towards ?
Location
- Interactive map

Amargol railway station is an abandoned railway station located on the Guntakal–Vasco da Gama line operated by the South Western Railway zone under Hubballi railway division. It is situated at Amargol, Hubli in Dharwad district in the Indian state of Karnatak.
