= Kendriya Vidyalaya, Hubli =

Coordinates: 15.3719°N 75.1267°E

KV No.1, Rajnagar, Hubli
- India

Information
- Established: 1965
- School board: Central Board of Secondary Education (CBSE)
- Authority: Ministry of Human Resource Development
- Principal: Mr Rangappa N.T.
- Website: www.no1hubli.kvs.ac.in

Kendriya Vidyalaya No.1 Rajnagar, Hubli is a school in Hubli, Karnataka, India, established in 1965 to provide primary and higher Secondary (10+2) education to the children of Central Government employees and also others of Hubli city. The school follows the syllabus of the Central Board of Secondary Education, New Delhi. The school is situated at the foot of the Nrupatunga Betta.

== History ==
Kendriya Vidyalaya (also once referred to as Central School) started in a rented building in Hosur, Hubli in 1965. Late Mr. B. M. Ventakaramiah was the first principal of the school. The first batch students passed out in 1968. The school shifted to the current location at Rajnagar in 1985. The Vidyalaya has 1353 students including 833 boys and 743 girls from Class I to Class XII.
