= Nalanda BCA College =

Private college in Karnataka, India

Coordinates: 15°21′53.29″N 75°14′12.5″E

- Motto: Quality Education with Government Specified Fees
- Type: Education and Private institution
- Established: 2008
- Principal: Manjula Rottimath
- Location: Hubli, Karnataka, India
- Nickname: NALANDians
- Website: http://nbca.in

Nalanda BCA College Vidyaranya, Gadag Road, Bhadiwad, Hubli, in the Indian state of Karnataka offers a 3 year Bachelor of Computer Application Degree Course. It was founded in 2008. The college works under the aegis of "Sidhu Vidya Samsthe" a charitable nonprofit educational trust. It was registered under Bombay Trust Act 1951 at Charity Commissioner Office Belgaum on 8 August 2000.

== History ==
"Nalanda" is a Sanskrit word meaning 'Continuous Education Charity'.

Nalanda BCA college was founded in 2008 by shri H.S.Nabhapur chairman Sidhu Vidya Samsthe.

== Campus ==
Spread across over 4 acres, the Campus contains various buildings with old architecture. Its amenities include class rooms, libraries, laboratories and a playground.

== Educational Programs ==
The Bachelor of Computer Applications (BCA) is a three year degree program with an annual enrolment of 50 students. The program is spread over six semesters and affiliated to Karnatak University Dharwad.
