= Panchatantra (film) =

- Directed by: Yogaraj Bhat
- Screenplay by: Yogaraj Bhat
- Story by: Masti
- Produced by: Hariprasad Jayanna; Hemanth Paradkar
- Starring: Vihan Gowda; Akshara Gowda; Sonal Monteiro; Rangayana Raghu
- Cinematography: Sugnaan
- Edited by: Madhu Tumbakere
- Music by: V. Harikrishna
- Production companies: Yogaraj Cinemas; JASP Productions; Purple Patch
- Release date: March 29, 2019
- Country: India
- Language: Kannada

Panchatantra is a 2019 Indian Kannada romantic drama film written and directed by Yogaraj Bhat and produced by Yogaraj Cinemas in association with JASP Productions and Purple Patch. The film stars Vihan Gowda, Akshara Gowda and Sonal Monteiro in the lead roles. The score and soundtrack for the film is composed by V. Harikrishna and the cinematography is by Sugnan. The movie got mixed reviews and did average collections at the box office.

== Synopsis ==
The plot of the film revolves around two rival groups who are always ready to insult, ridicule and put each other down at every opportunity they get. Sixty-year-old Rangappa, a real estate dealer owns a complex out of which he has sold a few of his shops and is managing the property well. The 24-year-old Karthik is an orphan, who, along with his three friends, looks after the garage owned by Appaiah Bond, an old hunk who is passionate about car races. While Rangappa is fighting a legal battle with Appaiah, his daughter, least bothered about all this, falls in love with Karthik. Will Rangappa approve of this relationship? Will Rangappa and Appaiah figure out a way to resolve their dispute?

== Cast ==
- Vihan Gowda as Karthik
- Akshara Gowda as Artha
- Sonal Monteiro as Sahitya
- Rangayana Raghu as Ranganna
- Deepak Shetty
- Bala Rajwadi
- Ramamurthy as Artha's father
- Simran Mishrikoti as Sheeba
- Diganth as himself (cameo appearance)

== Production ==
The film is targeted at the youth and features an exclusive Car rally race which was shot between Bangalore and Mysore.

== Soundtrack ==
V. Harikrishna has scored the soundtrack and score for the film, making his seventh collaboration with the director Yogaraj Bhat. To promote voting in the 2018 Karnataka Legislative Assembly election held in May 2018, the Election commission hired the film's team to create an anthem and spread awareness among the Youth section. Yogaraj Bhat wrote the lyrics with Harikrishna's music and Vijay Prakash vocals.

The first single track of the film "Shrungarada Honge Mara" was released on 25 December 2018 and was widely appreciated for its lyrical content by Bhat and choreography by Imran Sardhariya.

All lyrics are written by Yogaraj Bhat.

Track listing
No.	Title	Singer(s)	Length
1.	"Shrungarada Honge Mara"	Vijay Prakash	4:03
2.	"Ee Vayasalli"	Vijay Prakash, Shashank Sheshagiri, Vyasaraj Sosale	4:09
3.	"Neene Helu Mankuthimma"	Raghu Dixit	3:58
4.	"Beda Hogu Andbitlu"	Vasuki Vaibhav	3:44
5.	"Panchatantra Election Song"	V. Harikrishna, Shashank Sheshagiri	3:58
6.	"Panchatantra Title Song"	Prem	2:56
