= Hosanagar Assembly constituency =

Former Assembly constituency in Karnataka, India

Coordinates: 13.92°N 75.07°E

Hosanagar
- Former constituency for the Karnataka Legislative Assembly

Constituency details
- Country: India
- Region: South India
- State: Karnataka
- District: Shimoga district
- Established: 1967
- Abolished: 2008
- Reservation: None

Hosanagar Assembly constituency was one of the seats in Karnataka Legislative Assembly in India. The seat ceased to exist after the 2008 delimitation of constituencies.

== Members of the Legislative Assembly ==
Election	Member	Party
1967	I. Somasekharappa	Indian National Congress
1972	Sheernaly Chandrashekar	Indian National Congress
1978	S. M. Sheeranaly Chandrashrkhar	Indian National Congress
1983	B. Swamy Rao	Janata Party
1985	B. Swamy Rao	Indian National Congress
1989	B. Swamy Rao	Indian National Congress
1994	Ayanur Manjunath	Bharatiya Janata Party
1999	Dr. G. D. Narayanappa	Indian National Congress
2004	Hartalu Halappa	Bharatiya Janata Party

== Election results ==
=== Assembly Election 2004 ===
2004 Karnataka Legislative Assembly election : Hosanagar
Party	Candidate	Votes	%	±%
BJP	Hartalu Halappa	49,086	39.08%	New
INC	Dr. G. D. Narayanappa	32,235	25.66%	▼20.17
Independent	H. R. Basavarajappa	24,559	19.55%	New
JD(S)	Swamyrao. B	7,025	5.59%	▲4.62
BSP	Gurumurthy. M	6,654	5.30%	New
JP	Yuvaraj. B	2,074	1.65%	New
Kannada Nadu Party	Anitha. S. V	1,833	1.46%	New
Independent	Elumalai. S	1,097	0.87%	New
Urs Samyuktha Paksha	Hafeed. A. M	1,053	0.84%	New
Margin of victory		16,851	13.41%	▲2.93
Turnout		125,706	70.66%	▼3.17
Total valid votes		125,616		
Registered electors		177,902		▲15.57
BJP gain from INC		Swing	▼6.75	

=== Assembly Election 1999 ===
1999 Karnataka Legislative Assembly election : Hosanagar
Party	Candidate	Votes	%	±%
INC	Dr. G. D. Narayanappa	49,535	45.83%	▲31.48
JD(U)	G. Nanjundappa	38,204	35.35%	New
Independent	Y. H. Nagaraja	12,567	11.63%	New
Independent	B. Swamy Rao	6,718	6.22%	New
JD(S)	M. R. Rajashekar	1,051	0.97%	New
Margin of victory		11,331	10.48%	▲9.88
Turnout		113,643	73.83%	▼2.21
Total valid votes		108,075		
Rejected ballots		5,428	4.78%	▲3.22
Registered electors		153,935		▲10.51
INC gain from BJP		Swing	▲21.31	

=== Assembly Election 1994 ===
1994 Karnataka Legislative Assembly election : Hosanagar
Party	Candidate	Votes	%	±%
BJP	Ayanur Manjunath	25,505	24.52%	▲21.37
JD	G. Nanjundappa	24,878	23.92%	▼5.14
INC	Dr. G. D. Narayanappa	19,954	19.18%	New
INC	B. Swamy Rao	14,926	14.35%	▼29.45
KRRS	H. R. Basavarajappa	14,707	14.14%	New
Independent	H. R. Somashekar	3,251	3.13%	New
Margin of victory		627	0.60%	▼14.14
Turnout		105,920	76.04%	▲0.62
Total valid votes		104,009		
Rejected ballots		1,656	1.56%	▼3.12
Registered electors		139,301		▲10.56
BJP gain from INC		Swing	▼19.28	

=== Assembly Election 1989 ===
1989 Karnataka Legislative Assembly election : Hosanagar
Party	Candidate	Votes	%	±%
INC	B. Swamy Rao	39,668	43.80%	▼6.17
JD	G. Nanjundappa	26,316	29.06%	New
Kranti Sabha	H. R. Basavarajappa	18,557	20.49%	New
BJP	N. Seetharam Bhat	2,851	3.15%	New
JP	K. B. Krishnamurthy	1,931	2.13%	New
Independent	L. Venkatesh	956	1.06%	New
Margin of victory		13,352	14.74%	▲11.24
Turnout		95,019	75.42%	▲0.28
Total valid votes		90,573		
Rejected ballots		4,446	4.68%	▲3.30
Registered electors		125,992		▲32.70
INC hold		Swing	▼6.17	

=== Assembly Election 1985 ===
1985 Karnataka Legislative Assembly election : Hosanagar
Party	Candidate	Votes	%	±%
INC	B. Swamy Rao	35,155	49.97%	▲14.91
JP	G. Nanjundappa	32,694	46.47%	▼4.95
Independent	H. M. Puttaswamy	761	1.08%	New
Independent	Govindegowda	616	0.88%	New
Margin of victory		2,461	3.50%	▼12.86
Turnout		71,340	75.14%	▲4.30
Total valid votes		70,358		
Rejected ballots		982	1.38%	▼0.67
Registered electors		94,943		▲14.65
INC gain from JP		Swing	▼1.45	

=== Assembly Election 1983 ===
1983 Karnataka Legislative Assembly election : Hosanagar
Party	Candidate	Votes	%	±%
JP	B. Swamy Rao	29,542	51.42%	▲8.20
INC	S. M. Sheeranaly Chandrashrkhar	20,143	35.06%	▲32.60
LKD	B. N. Basappa	7,344	12.78%	New
Independent	Govindegowda	428	0.74%	New
Margin of victory		9,399	16.36%	▲9.35
Turnout		58,660	70.84%	▼7.17
Total valid votes		57,457		
Rejected ballots		1,203	2.05%	▼0.21
Registered electors		82,810		▲12.90
JP gain from INC(I)		Swing	▲1.19	

=== Assembly Election 1978 ===
1978 Karnataka Legislative Assembly election : Hosanagar
Party	Candidate	Votes	%	±%
INC(I)	S. M. Sheeranaly Chandrashrkhar	28,092	50.23%	New
JP	B. Swamy Rao	24,174	43.22%	New
Independent	Abdul Rahman	1,743	3.12%	New
INC	D. Gangamma. D. B	1,374	2.46%	▼39.23
Independent	C. Mallappa	343	0.61%	New
Margin of victory		3,918	7.01%	▲1.87
Turnout		57,223	78.01%	▲9.39
Total valid votes		55,928		
Rejected ballots		1,295	2.26%	▲2.26
Registered electors		73,349		▲19.22
INC(I) gain from INC		Swing	▲8.54	

=== Assembly Election 1972 ===
1972 Mysore State Legislative Assembly election : Hosanagar
Party	Candidate	Votes	%	±%
INC	Sheernaly Chandrashekar	17,158	41.69%	▼4.72
SSP	B. Swamy Rao	15,043	36.55%	New
INC(O)	D. P. Wodayar	8,952	21.75%	New
Margin of victory		2,115	5.14%	▼1.68
Turnout		42,218	68.62%	▲2.27
Total valid votes		41,153		
Registered electors		61,525		▲21.56
INC hold		Swing	▼4.72	

=== Assembly Election 1967 ===
1967 Mysore State Legislative Assembly election : Hosanagar
Party	Candidate	Votes	%	±%
INC	I. Somasekharappa	14,535	46.41%	New
SSP	B. S. Rao	12,400	39.60%	New
Independent	Veerabasappa	2,613	8.34%	New
ABJS	K. M. Renuka	1,271	4.06%	New
Independent	M. D. G. Saheb	219	0.70%	New
Margin of victory		2,135	6.82%	
Turnout		33,582	66.35%	
Total valid votes		31,317		
Registered electors		50,613		
INC win (new seat)				

== See also ==
- List of constituencies of Karnataka Legislative Assembly
