= Nehru Arts, Science and Commerce College =

Nehru Arts, Science and Commerce College is a college in Hubli, Karnataka, run by Anjuman-e-Islam, the state's oldest minority educational institution. It is affiliated to Karnataka University and was established in 1965. It is a self-financed co-education college.

== Courses offered ==
=== Undergraduate ===
B.A. History, Economics, Kannada B.A. History, Economics, Political Science B.A. History, Economics, Sociology B.Sc. Chemistry, Botany, Zoology B.Sc. Physics, Chemistry, Mathematics
