= Sonal Monteiro =

Indian actress

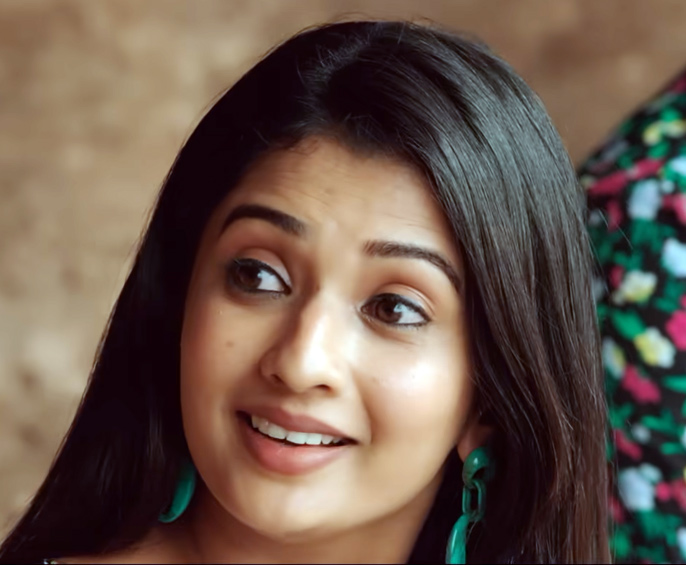
- Sonal Monteiro in 2023 Kannada film Garadi
- Born: Mangalore, Karnataka, India
- Occupations: Actress, Model
- Years active: 2014 – Present

Sonal Monteiro is an Indian actress. She appeared in many Coastalwood and Sandalwood movies.

== Early life ==
Sonal joined St. Agnes College, Mangalore. During her studies, she joined the modelling industry and won Miss Beautiful Smile 2013, Miss Konkan 2015. She first appeared in "Anjea Sarkhen Chedun" Konkani Album Song of Late. Jerome Dsouza from the Konkani Music Album – Naach Konkannant, Which released on YouTube in the year 2013 and gained popularity in coastal region.

== Career ==
She made her acting debut in 2015 as the lead actress in the Tulu film Ekka Saka. Sonal then played a modern girl role in Jai Tulunad and then played the lead role in the romantic comedy Pilibail Yamunakka. Her Sandalwood film Abhisaarike got released in 2018. In 2018 another film MLA with Pratham also released, released in 2018. Sonal Monteiro signed on to a Bollywood Film Saajan Chale Sasuraal 2 . She has two additional Sandalwood films Gaalipata 2 and Buddivantha 2 in production Stage. Sonal Monteiro's recent Release Panchatantra film directed by Yograj Cinema's was superhit rom-com, Panchatantra. She also played important star role in the Roberrt 2021 and Love Matteru 2025.

Alongside her acting career, Sonal participates in stage shows, is on the Jury for Beauty Pageants and sings.

== Filmography ==
- All films are in Kannada, unless otherwise noted.

Key
†	Denotes films that have not yet been released

Year	Title	Role	Notes	Ref.
2015	Ekka Saka	Divya	Tulu film	
2016	Jai Tulunad	Nandhitha	Tulu film	
2016	Pilibail Yamunakka	Nisha	Tulu film	
2018	Abhisaarike	Sarika	Nominated—SIIMA Award for Best Female Debutant Actor – Kannada	
2018	MLA	Sonu		
2018	Maduve Dibbana	Parvathi		
2019	Panchatantra	Sahitya		
2020	Demo Piece	Adhya		
2021	Roberrt	Tanu		
2022	Shambho Shiva Shankara	Divya		
2022	Banaras	Dhani		
2023	Garadi	Puppy Sukanya / Kabbali		
2023	Sugar Factory	Adithi Bopanna		
2025	Rakshasa			
2025	Kuladalli Keelyavudo	Tahsildar		
2025	Maadeva	Parvathi		
2025	Love Matteru	Varsha		
2025	Radheyaa	Amrutha		
TBA	Budhivanta 2 †	TBA	Post-production	
TBA	Margaret Lover of Ramachari †	Meera Raghav Ram "Maggi"	Filming	
TBA	Kadal Kote †	TBA	Filming	
