= Vijayavani =

Kannada-language newspaper in Karnataka, India

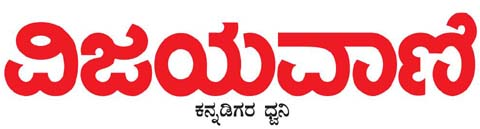

- Type: Daily newspaper
- Format: Broadsheet
- Owner: VRL Group
- Editor: Channegowda K N
- Founded: 2012
- Headquarters: Hubballi, India
- Circulation: 542,457 (as of 2022)
- Website: vijayavani.net
- Free online archives: epapervijayavani.in

Vijayavani is a Kannada-language newspaper distributed in the Indian state of Karnataka. It is published by VRL Group owned by logistics tycoon Vijay Sankeshwar.

Having launched on 1 April 2012, Vijayavani started with merely three editions. Today it has editions in several places like Bengaluru, Mangaluru, Hubballi, Mysuru, Belagavi, Vijayapura, Gangavathi, Chitradurga, Shivamogga and Kalaburgi.

Vijayavani the flagship entity of the VRL Group is the largest circulated newspaper in Karnataka. Vijayavani became the only Kannada newspaper to launch nine editions in just 90 days from its launch. Vijayavani is an all colour paper in all Karnataka. With growth rate of 262% in 3 years, Vijayavani today has a certified circulation of 542,457 copies. Vijayavani has an unmatched reach which covers 28 districts out of almost 30 districts in entire Karnataka. Apart from the regular content, a four-page.

== See also ==
- List of Kannada-language newspapers
- List of Kannada-language magazines
- List of newspapers in India
- Media in Karnataka
- Media of India
