= MLA (2018 Kannada film) =

- Directed by: Mourya Manjunath
- Produced by: Venkatesh Reddy; Venki Palugulla
- Starring: Pratham; Sonal Monteiro
- Cinematography: Krishna Sarathi
- Music by: Vikram Subramanya
- Production company: Triveni 24 Crafts
- Release date: 23 March 2018
- Country: India
- Language: Kannada

MLA is a 2018 Indian Kannada-language comedy-drama film written and directed by Mourya Manjunath. The film stars Pratham and Sonal Monteiro. The film is jointly produced by Venkatesh Reddy and Venki Palugulla under the banner of Triveni 24 Crafts. Krishna Sarathi is behind the camera while Vikram Subramanya has scored and composed music.

== Synopsis ==
MLA is a satirical comedy drama showcasing the present political scenario. As the abbreviation (Mother Promise Lekkasigada Aasami) tells the protagonist is a happy go lucky guy until just before the interval block, he gets a chance to become MLA. Now his life completely changes & the legislature drama unfolds with a humor touch.

== Cast ==
- Pratham as Pratham
- Sonal Monteiro
- Kuri Prathap
- Sparsha Rekha
- Chandrakala Mohan
- Navarasa Ramakrishna
- Naveen D. Padil
- Victory Vasu

== Production ==
MLC turned actor HM Revanna plays the Chief Minister role in the film. Speaking to media, the former minister quoted

”I loved playing the role of Chief Minister for few minutes, and it felt good that I will be on silver screen. The director and producer have good experience in the industry, and with Pratham playing the lead role, MLA will attract large audience."

== Soundtrack ==
The film's score and soundtrack is composed by Vikram Subramanya. The film's music was launched by Darshan in the presence of Sara Govindu (Chairman - Karnataka Film Chamber).

Tracklist
No.	Title	Lyrics	Singer(s)	Length
1.	"Aralo Taavareye"	Naagarjuna Sharma	Haricharan, Maadhuri
2.	"Baa Jagada Niyama Badalisu"	Chetan Kumar	Vikram Subramanya
3.	"Kannadada Kandha"	Gurudev	Ranjith
4.	"Donku Baalada Naayakare"	Gurudev	Vikram Subramanya
5.	"Enannu Ariyada"	Subramanya Bhat	Abhijith Rao

== Reception ==
A critic from The Times of India wrote that "Watch this film is you are a fan of Pratham and his antics". A critic from The New Indian Express wrote that "Overall, MLA is strictly for those few who like everything about Pratham and his high-pitched dialogues. Otherwise, there is nothing in the movie".
