= Unkal railway station =

Railway station in Karnataka

Unkal

General information
- Location: P.B. Road, Vidya Nagar, Hubli, Dharwad district, Karnatak; India
- Coordinates: 15°22′38″N 75°07′27″E
- Elevation: 646 metres (2,119 ft)
- System: Indian Railways station
- Owner: Indian Railways
- Operator: South Western Railway zone
- Line: Guntakal–Vasco da Gama line
- Platforms: 2
- Tracks: Double Electric-Line

Construction
- Structure type: Standard (on ground)

Other information
- Status: Functioning
- Station code: UNK
- Zone(s): South Western Railway zone
- Division(s): Hubballi

Services
Preceding station	Indian Railways	Following station
Hubballi Junction towards ?	South Western Railway zone Guntakal–Vasco da Gama section	Amargol towards ?
Location
- Interactive map

Unkal railway station is a railway station located on the Guntakal–Vasco da Gama line operated by the South Western Railway zone under Hubballi railway division. It is situated beside P.B. Road at Vidya Nagar, Hubli in Dharwad district in the Indian state of Karnatak.
