= Sparsha Rekha =

Indian actress

- Other name: Rekha Prasad
- Occupations: Actress; film producer
- Years active: 2000-2004; 2015-present

Rekha, popularly known by her stage name as Sparsha Rekha is an Indian model and actress known for her work in Kannada cinema. She is known for debut in Sparsha in 2000 and in the 2002 film Majestic. However, at the peak of her acting career Rekha decided to take break and continue her education. In 2016, she participated as contestant in the reality show Bigg Boss season 4 and finished as the second Runner-up of the show.

== Career ==
Rekha pursued modeling and subsequently appeared in the films Sparsha (2000) and Majestic (2002), both of which were successful. She decided to take a hiatus in her career to complete her Bachelor's of Business Management degree at Maharani College, Bangalore. During this period, Rekha represented Karnataka in the 4th and 5th Indian national level athletic meets and was an advocate for keeping the environment clean. She turned producer with the film Demo Piece (2020).

== Filmography ==
Year	Film	Role	Notes
2000	Sparsha	Suma	
2001	Banallu Neene Buviyallu Neene		
2002	Majestic	Kiran	
2004	Santhosha	Siddhu's sister	
2015	Ranna		Special appearance in the song "What to Do"
2017	Srikanta	Srikanta's friend	
2017	Devrovne Bidu Guru		
2018	MLA		
2020	Demo Piece	Harsha's mother	
2020	Popcorn Monkey Tiger	Padma	
2020	Bicchugatti	Kanakavva Nagathi	
2021	Badava Rascal	Premakumari	
2021	Arjun Gowda	Janaki Gowda	

== Television ==
Year	Television	Role	Ref.
2016	Bigg Boss Kannada 4	Contestant	
2020	Nagiso Challenge	Guest	
2023–present	Tripura Sundari	Devyani	
