= Kagodu Thimmappa =

Indian politician

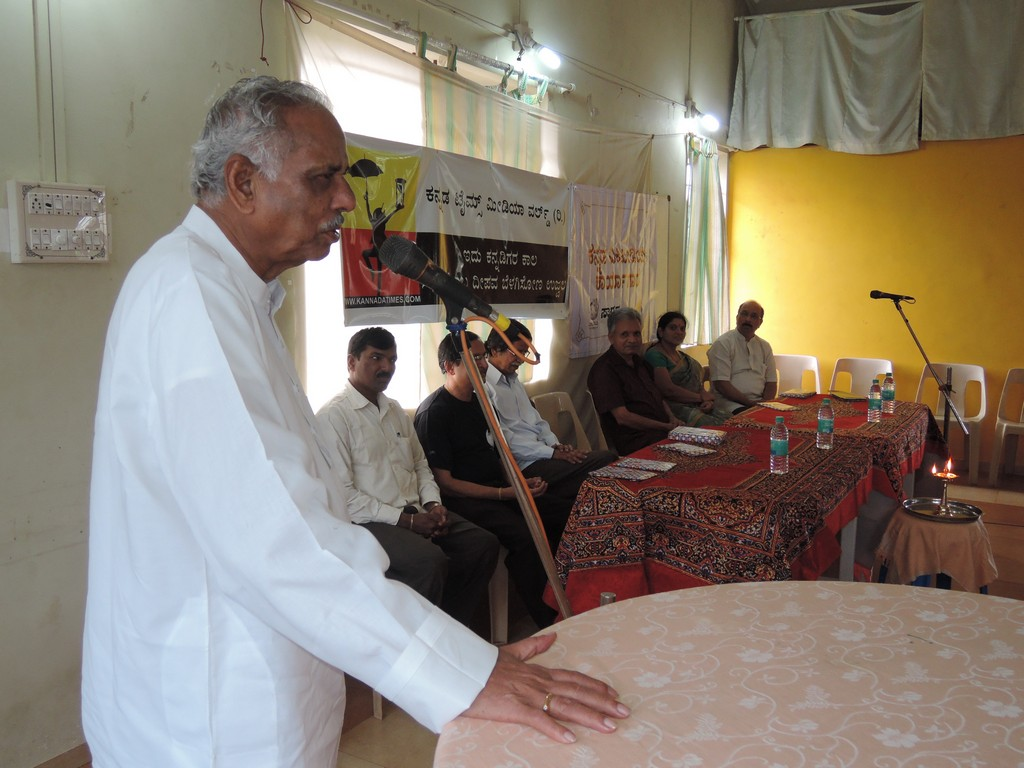
- Thimmappa at a Wikipedia workshop, 2013

Minister for Revenue and Muzrai, Government of Karnataka
- In office 20 June 2016 – May 2018
- Preceded by: Srinivasa Prasad
- Succeeded by: R. V. Deshpande

14th Speaker of the Karnataka Legislative Assembly
- In office 31 May 2013 – 20 June 2016
- Governor: Vajubhai Vala
- Preceded by: K. G. Bopaiah
- Succeeded by: K. B. Koliwad
- Constituency: Sagar

Personal details
- Born: 10 September 1932 (age 93) Kagodu
- Political party: Indian National Congress
- Spouse: Deepa
- Children: 3

Kagodu Thimmappa (born 10 September 1932) is an Indian retired politician who was the 21st speaker of the Karnataka Legislative Assembly and member of the Indian National Congress and a former member of the Karnataka Legislative Assembly elected from the Sagar. He became the Speaker of the 14th Assembly in May 2013. He served as the Minister of Revenue and Muzrai in the Siddaramaiah cabinet between 2016 and 2018, before retiring from active politics.

Kagodu Thimmappa received honorary doctorates from Kuvempu University and Keladi Shivappa Nayaka University of Agricultural & Horticultural Sciences on 22 January 2025 at the age of 91.

== Early life and education ==
Kagodu Thimmappa was born in Kagodu, Sagar Taluk, Karnataka, 18 kilometres (11 mi) from Sagar Town. He was the third son of Savaji Beera Nayaka and Byramma. He completed his primary education in nearby Hirenallur and High school studies in Sagar. Then he took B.Com., B.L. Degrees in Bangalore. He worked as a lawyer in Sagar for some time.

Originally Thimmappa was an agriculturist by profession. Dr. Rama Manohar Lohia, George Fernandes, Gopala Gowda and other socialist leaders were his political influences during his younger days.

== Political career ==
He was interested in Social Service. He was a member of Taluk Board from 1961 and then worked as the President of Taluk Board from 1967 to 1974. He was a member of both Fifth Legislative Assembly and Legislative Council in 1980 and later served as Minister for Food and Forest in Sri Gundu Rao Ministry and then became the Minister of Public Works during the same year.

He was the founding President, Sanjay Polytechnic, Sagar, (2 terms), founding President of Janata Educational Society, member of 9th Legislative Assembly, chairman of Karnataka Housing Board in Veerendra Patil and S.Bangarappa Government, later he served as Minister for Social Welfare in the cabinet of Veerappa Moily.

He was elected to the 10th Legislative Assembly, then re-elected to the 11th Assembly from Sagar Constituency in 1999 and appointed Minister for Social Welfare, Horticulture, Family Welfare & Health and Information in the Council of Ministers headed by S. M. Krishna on 17 October 1999. He was appointed also the President of Congress Nadige Janara Balige (Congress march towards people) Programme on 16 July 2011 by the Karnataka Pradesh Congress Committee. He traveled across the Karnataka state and made the program successful. Later he was elected to the 14th Legislative Assembly from Sagar Constituency and unanimously elected as Speaker of Karnataka Assembly on 31 May 2013. He served as the minister for Revenue department between June 2016 after the cabinet reshuffle, and May 2018. He lost his seat at the 2018 election to Hartalu Halappa by a margin of 8,093 votes. Two months later he announced his retirement from active politics.
