= Hartalu Halappa =

Indian politician

Chairman of Mysore Sales International Limited
- In office 28 July 2020 – May 2023
- Chief Minister: B. S. Yediyurappa; Basavaraj Bommai

Cabinet Minister Government of Karnataka
- In office 30 May 2008 – 2 May 2010
- Ministry: Term
- Minister of Food, Civil Supplies & Consumer Affairs: 30 May 2008 - 2 May 2010

Member of Karnataka Legislative Assembly
- In office 2018–2023
- Preceded by: Kagodu Thimmappa
- Succeeded by: Belur Gopalkrishna
- Constituency: Sagar
- In office 2008–2013
- Preceded by: Kumar Bangarappa
- Succeeded by: Madhu Bangarappa
- Constituency: Sorab
- In office 2004–2008
- Preceded by: G. D. Narayanappa
- Succeeded by: constituency defunct
- Constituency: Hosanagar

Personal details
- Born: 7 March 1961 (age 65) Hosakoppa
- Party: Bharatiya Janata Party
- Occupation: Politician

Hartalu Halappa is an Indian politician and member of the Bharatiya Janata Party. Halappa is a member of the Karnataka Legislative Assembly representing the Sagar constituency in Shimoga district. He was Minister of Food, Civil Supplies and Consumer Affairs Minister in B. S. Yeddyurappa's ministry. On 28 July 2020 he was appointed the Chairman of MSIL.
