= Kannada Nadu Party =

Indian political party

- Abbreviation: KNP
- Founder: Vijay Sankeshwar
- Founded: 2003 (23 years ago)
- Dissolved: 2004 (22 years ago)
- Split from: Bharatiya Janata Party
- Merged into: Janata Dal (Secular)

Kannada Nadu Party was a political party in Karnataka, India, founded by Vijay Sankeshwar. It had contested elections in 2004. It later merged into Janata Dal (Secular). Sankeshwar started the party after quitting the Bharatiya Janata Party that he was a member of. His party contested all seats at the 2004 election. Actor Dwarakish served as vice-president of the party during that time.
