= Hubli =

- City Corporation
- Hubballi
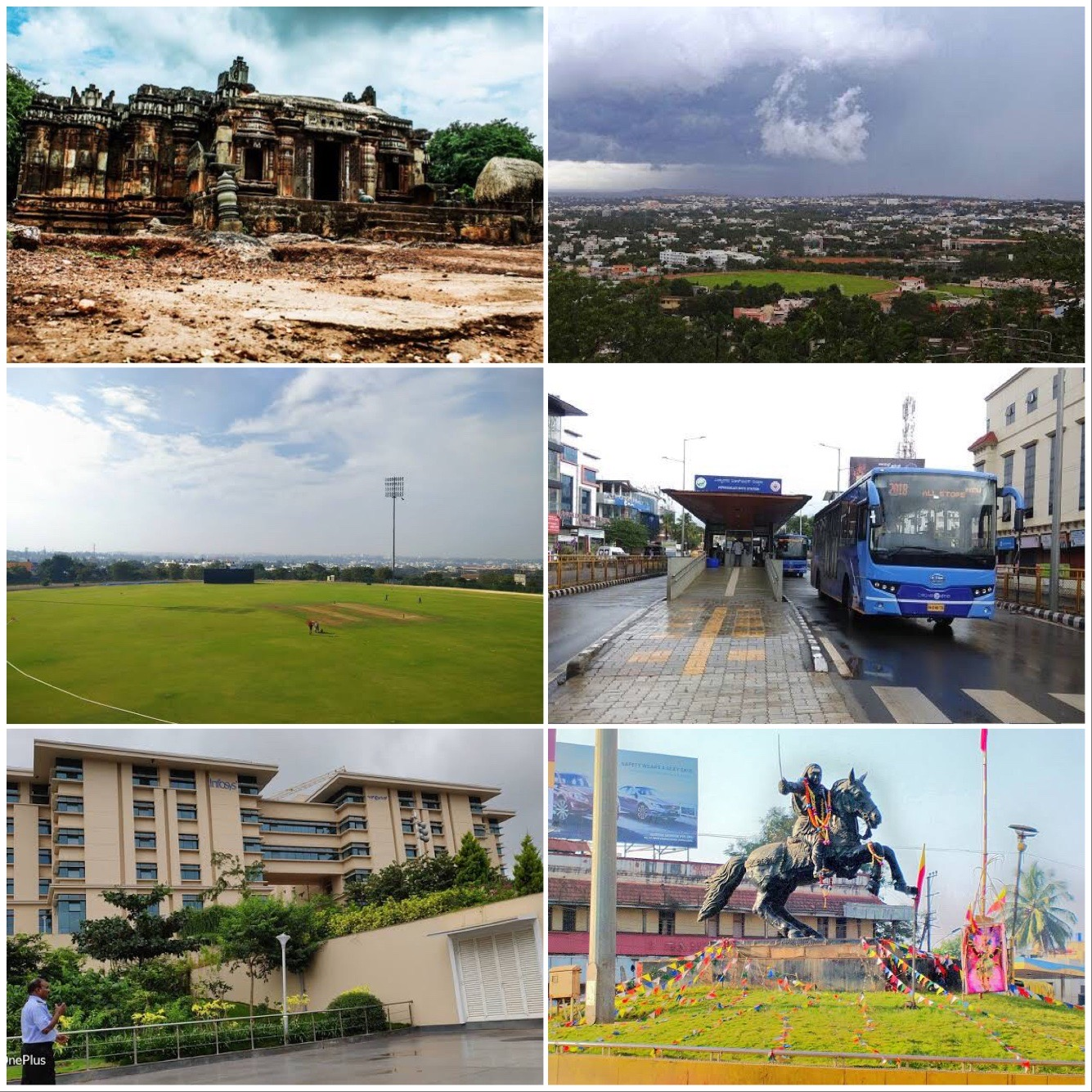
- Clockwise from Top left: Chandramouleshwara Temple, KSCA Stadium, HD-BRTS, Rani Chennamma Circle, Infosys Hubli, Hubli City Skyline
- Nicknames: Chhota Bombay, Mini Bombay, Hubli–Dharwad
- Interactive map of Hubli
- Coordinates: 15°21′0.78″N 75°08′15.45″E
- Country: India
- State: Karnataka
- District: Dharwad
- Established: 11th century

Government
  - Mayor: Durgamma Shashikanth Bijawad

Area
  - Total: 213.42 km^{2} (82.40 sq mi)
- Hubli-Dharwad MC
- Elevation: 671 m (2,201 ft)

Population (2011)
  - Total: 943,788
  - Rank: India: 49; Karnataka: 2 (Along with Dharwad)
  - Density: 4,422.2/km^{2} (11,453/sq mi)
- Hubli-Dharwad MC

Demographics
  - Literacy: 86.79%
  - Sex ratio (females per 1,000 males): 989
- Time zone: UTC+05:30 (IST)
- Pincode(s): 580001 - 580064 (incl. Dharwad west end)
- Area code: +91-0836
- Vehicle registration: KA 25 (Navanagar RTO); KA 63 (Gabbur RTO)
- Official language: Kannada
- Website: http://www.hdmc.mrc.gov.in

Hubli, officially Hubballi, is a city in the Indian state of Karnataka. The twin cities Hubli–Dharwad form the second largest municipality and urban agglomeration of Karnataka in terms of area and population and the largest city in North Karnataka. Hubli is in Dharwad district of Karnataka and is the taluk headquarters of Hubli City and Hubli Rural. Although it hosts the Hubli-Dharwad Municipal Corporation, the district headquarters is in Dharwad.

It also houses the largest number of government offices outside the state capital. In 2016, Hubli-Dharwad was selected for solar city / green city master plans. In 2017, government of India included Hubli-Dharwad city for a smart city project, a flagship scheme for overall development of infrastructure in the twin-cities.

== History ==
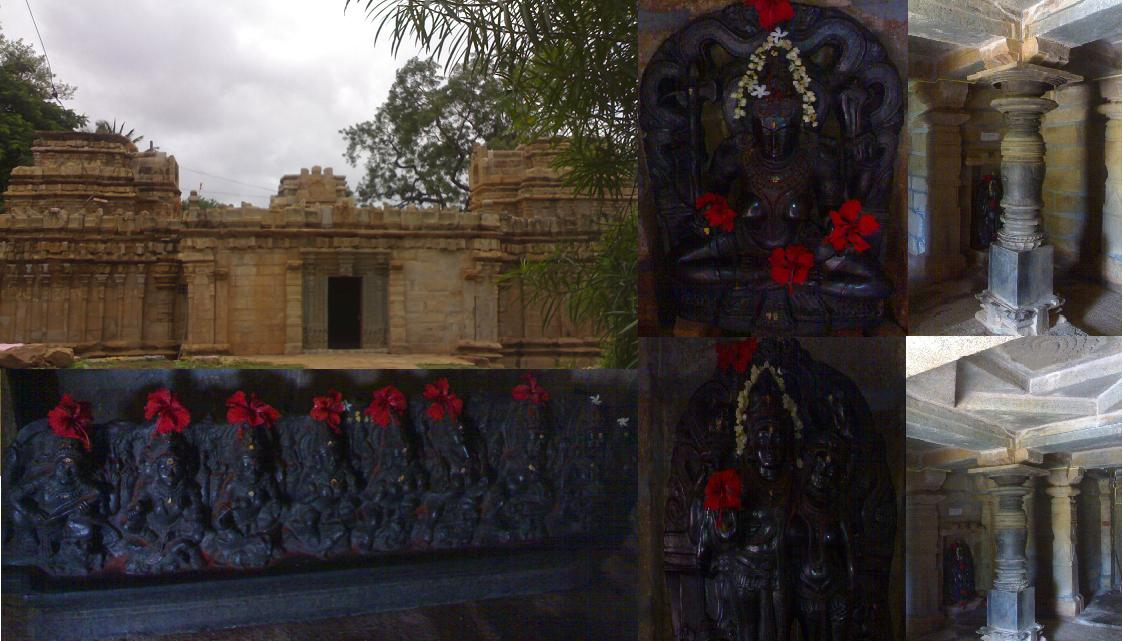
Bhavani Shankar Temple

Rayara Hubli, also called 'Eleya Purvada Halli' or 'Purballi', was the old Hubli, and according to an inscription in the Bhavani Shankar Temple, the oldest temple in the city, was founded in the 11th Century. The impressive Chandramauleshwara Temple, Unkal is from Chalukyan times and was built in the 11th or 12th century.

Under Vijayanagara Rayas, Rayara Hubli grew as a commercial centre, famous for trade in cotton, saltpetre and iron. Under the rule of the Adilshahis, the British opened a factory here. The factory was looted by Shivaji in 1673. The Mughals conquered Rayara Hubli and it was then placed under the governance of the Nawab of Savanur, who built a new extension named Majidpura. In 1727, trader Basappa Shettar built the town and fort of new Hubli around the Durgadabail (fort maidan) part of Rayara Hubli.

Hubli's famous Moorusavira Matha is claimed to have been established by a Sharana of Basaveshwara's period. Hubli was conquered by the Marathas from the Nawab of Savanur in 1755–56. In the following years, Hubli was conquered by Hyder Ali, only to be recaptured by the Marathas in 1790. At this point in time, the old town was administered by a person named Phadke under the Peshwas and the new town was under the administration of the Sangli Patwardhan. The British took Old Hubli from the Peshwas in 1817. The new town, with 47 other villages, was handed over to the British by the Sangli Patwardhan in lieu of subsidy in 1820. Later in 1880, the British started the Railway workshop and with this, Hubli came to be reckoned as an industrial centre in this part of India.

The Sufi shrine, Sayed Fathesha Wali, located near the indipump circle of old Hubli, was visited by Tipu Sultan.

== Governance ==
=== HDMC - Hubli Dharwad Municipal Corporation ===
The Hubli-Dharwad Municipal Corporation (HDMC) established in 1962 under the Government of India Act of 1850, is responsible for managing the administration and civic infrastructure of the twin cities of Hubli and Dharwad in Karnataka, India. HDMC unified the two cities which is Hubli and Dharward, which are separated by a distance of 20 kilometres. The corporation administers an area of 213 square kilometres and operates from its headquarters on Sir Siddappa Kambali Road.

HDMC serves a population of over 943,857, with Hubli accounting for 410,455 residents. For effective governance, the corporation is divided into 12 administrative zones and comprises 82 wards, 56 of which belong to the Hubli region. The municipal body is tasked with providing essential services such as sanitation, water supply, waste management, and urban development for the residents of both cities.

In each ward, a corporator is elected, and the majority party forms a council to oversee different administrative departments. The council members elect the Mayor from within their group. The council currently comprises 67 members. The Municipal Corporation's top official is the Commissioner, who supervises key departments such as public works, taxation, water supply, urban planning, fire services, health and sanitation, and finance. Ishwar Ullagaddi (KAS) is the current Municipal Commissioner. The municipal council is currently in a state of suspension, pending the election of new members.

=== Civic amenities ===
==== Road transport ====
The North Western Karnataka Road Transport Corporation (NWKRTC), established on 1 November 1997, under the Road Transport Corporation Act of 1950, provides efficient and economical public transportation across Belagavi, Dharwad, Uttara Kannada, Bagalkot, Gadag, and Haveri districts. Headquartered in Hubli, the corporation operates through nine divisional offices located in Belagavi, Hubballi, Dharwad, Sirsi, Bagalkot, Gadag, Chikkodi, Haveri, and Hubli-Dharwad City.

The North West Karnataka Road Transport Corporation (NWKRTC), Hubli, has introduced the Shakti Scheme, providing free bus travel for women. To avail of this service, women can present government-issued ID cards such as Voter ID, Aadhaar, Driving License, or other state or central government IDs. Approximately 15 to 15.5 lakh (1.5-1.55 million) passengers use these buses daily.

The North-Western Karnataka Road Transport Corporation (NWKRTC) has launched 10 light blue urban transport buses in Hubli, with plans to add 100 more under the government's 'Shakti' scheme. These BS-6 Tata buses feature modern amenities like CCTV cameras, GPS, LED display boards, voice announcements, and panic buttons for women's safety. To ensure efficient monitoring, officials can track speed, braking, fuel levels, and skipped stops via a mobile app. NWKRTC Managing Director Priyanga M confirmed successful trials and projected the arrival of the remaining buses by November, supported by a 50% grant from the Directorate of Urban Land Transport (DULT).

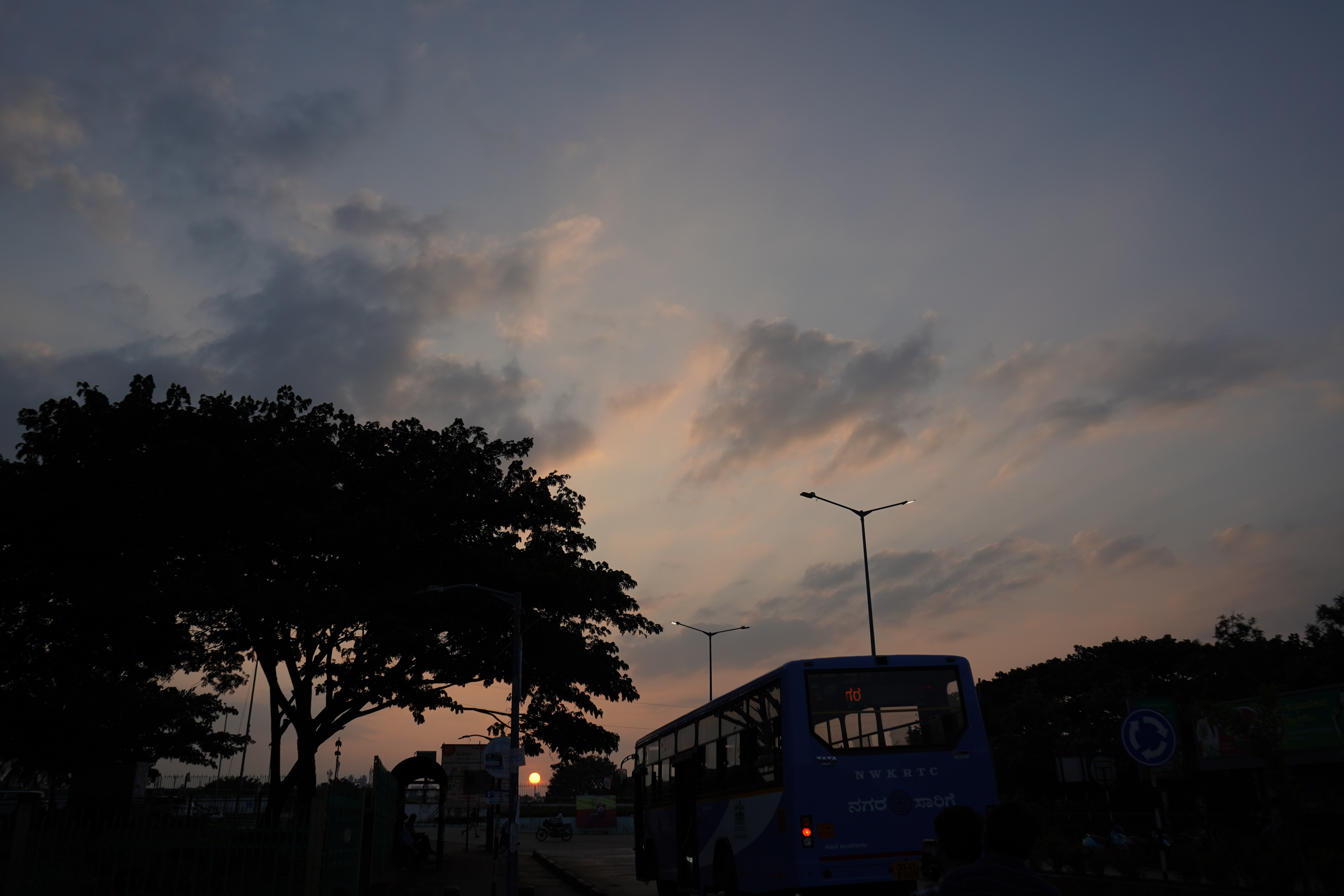

== Geography ==
Hubli-Dharwad is situated on a laterite plateau in the northwestern part of Karnataka, to the east of the Western Ghats at an average elevation of approximately 640 metres above sea level. The terrain of the city is undulating and the region has black cotton soil derived from the underlying volcanic (Deccan Trap) rock, which is noted for its fertility and suitability for agriculture. The twin city area is also home to several water bodies, including Unkal Lake and Kelgeri Lake, which contribute to the local landscape. The surrounding areas support a variety of flora typical of the Deccan plateau, including scrub forests and grasslands. While it is not a biodiversity hotspot, the region supports local wildlife and vegetation adapted to its tropical wet and dry climate. The ecological balance is influenced by agricultural practices and urban development.

=== Climate ===
Hubli-Dharwad has a tropical wet and dry climate. Summers are hot and dry, lasting from late February to early June. They are followed by the monsoon season, with moderate temperatures and a large amount of precipitation. Temperatures are fairly moderate from late October to early February, with virtually no rainfall. Hubli is 640 meters above sea level. The average yearly rainfall is 838 mm.

Climate data for Hubli
Month	Jan	Feb	Mar	Apr	May	Jun	Jul	Aug	Sep	Oct	Nov	Dec	Year
Mean daily maximum °C (°F)	29.1 (84.4)	31.7 (89.1)	34.5 (94.1)	40.0 (104.0)	38.5 (101.3)	28.2 (82.8)	25.9 (78.6)	25.6 (78.1)	27.7 (81.9)	29.2 (84.6)	28.7 (83.7)	28.2 (82.8)	30.6 (87.1)
Mean daily minimum °C (°F)	14.5 (58.1)	15.7 (60.3)	18.6 (65.5)	27.0 (80.6)	25.0 (77.0)	20.9 (69.6)	20.9 (69.6)	20.2 (68.4)	19.6 (67.3)	18.8 (65.8)	16.5 (61.7)	14.3 (57.7)	19.3 (66.8)
Average rainfall mm (inches)	0 (0)	0 (0)	10 (0.4)	40 (1.6)	60 (2.4)	150 (5.9)	210 (8.3)	200 (7.9)	110 (4.3)	60 (2.4)	30 (1.2)	0 (0)	870 (34.4)

== Demographics ==
Historical population
Year	Pop.	±%
1901	59,913	—
1911	61,440	+2.5%
1921	66,772	+8.7%
1931	83,494	+25.0%
1941	95,512	+14.4%
1951	129,609	+35.7%
1961	171,326	+32.2%
2001	533,820	+211.6%
2011	668,449	+25.2%
Source: Census of India

The population of the twin cities as per provisional figures of Census 2011 is 943,857 and is urban. Hubli-Dharwad's population increased by 22.99% between 1981 and 1991, from 527,108 to 648,298, and by 21.2% between 1991 and 2001. The municipality covers 213 km^{2}.

Religions in Hubli-Dharwad city (2011)
Religion	Percent
Hinduism	67.44%
Islam	27.15%
Christianity	2.79%
Jainism	1.61%
Other or not stated	1.01%

Languages of Hubli-Dharwad City
1. Kannada (55.8%)
2. Urdu (25.7%)
3. Marathi (4.19%)
4. Telugu (4.04%)
5. Hindi (3.47%)
6. Gujarati (2.81%)
7. Konkani (1.63%)
8. Others (2.35%)

== Governance and politics ==
=== Hubli-Dharwad Municipal Corporation ===
Hubli-Dharwad Municipal Corporation (HDMC) was constituted in 1962 by combining the two cities separated by a distance of 20 kilometres. The area covered by the corporation is spread over 45 revenue villages and is the second-largest city corporation in Karnataka state. The population of the city as per the 1991 census was 700,000. The population of Hubli-Dharwad is 943,857 according to 2011 Census. Hubli Municipal Council was established under the Government of India Act 1850, and the Dharwad Municipal Council first came into existence on 1 January 1856. Both were merged later. The headquarters of HDMC is situated in Hubli, comprising 82 members covering four Vidhan Sabha Constituencies of Hubli-Dharwad. There has been a huge demand by people of Dharwad to create a separate civic body and get itself detached by HDMC. Claims are that most of the funds are allocated to Hubli solely.

On 2 January 2025 the Karnataka state cabinet declared the separation of Hubli-Dharwad Municipal Corporation, formation of new municipal corporation for the city of Dharwad.

Rudresh Ghali (K.A.S) is the Commissioner of the Hubli-Dharwad Municipal Corporation Durgamma Shashikanth Bijawad and Ratnabai Ekanath Nazare are the Mayor and Deputy Mayor respectively.

=== Municipal finance ===
According to financial data published on the CityFinance Portal of the Ministry of Housing and Urban Affairs,

== Economy ==
Hubli is a commercial hub and is known as Vanijya Nagari. Hubli has a large cluster of some 100,000 small and medium industries. The Government of India has set up a Software Technology Park of India on Dharwad Road and Aryabhata Tech Park in Navanagar region of Hubli. The city is situated on the dividing line between Malnad and the Deccan plateau. Malnad is well known for its forests and forest-based industries and the other three sides are known for their agricultural products including cotton, groundnut, and oilseeds, as well as manganese ore and granite.

The establishment of a new-generation diesel locomotive shed in the city by Indian Railways was another major boost for the development of industries in this region, as it was the first of its kind in Indian Railways history. The diesel locomotive shed at Hubli is the largest holder of EMD locomotives in India and was set up in 1880.

== Places of interest ==
Hubli is a major commercial and industrial center in Karnataka. The city and surrounding region feature several historical sites such as:

- Unkal Lake
- Chandramouleshwara Temple
- Indira Glass House Garden
- Siddharoodha Math
- Dharwad
- Dandeli
- Badami
- Pattadakal
- Aihole
- Nrupatunga Hill (same place as Nrupatunga Betta)
- ISKCON Krishna Balarama Temple

== Transport ==
=== Air ===
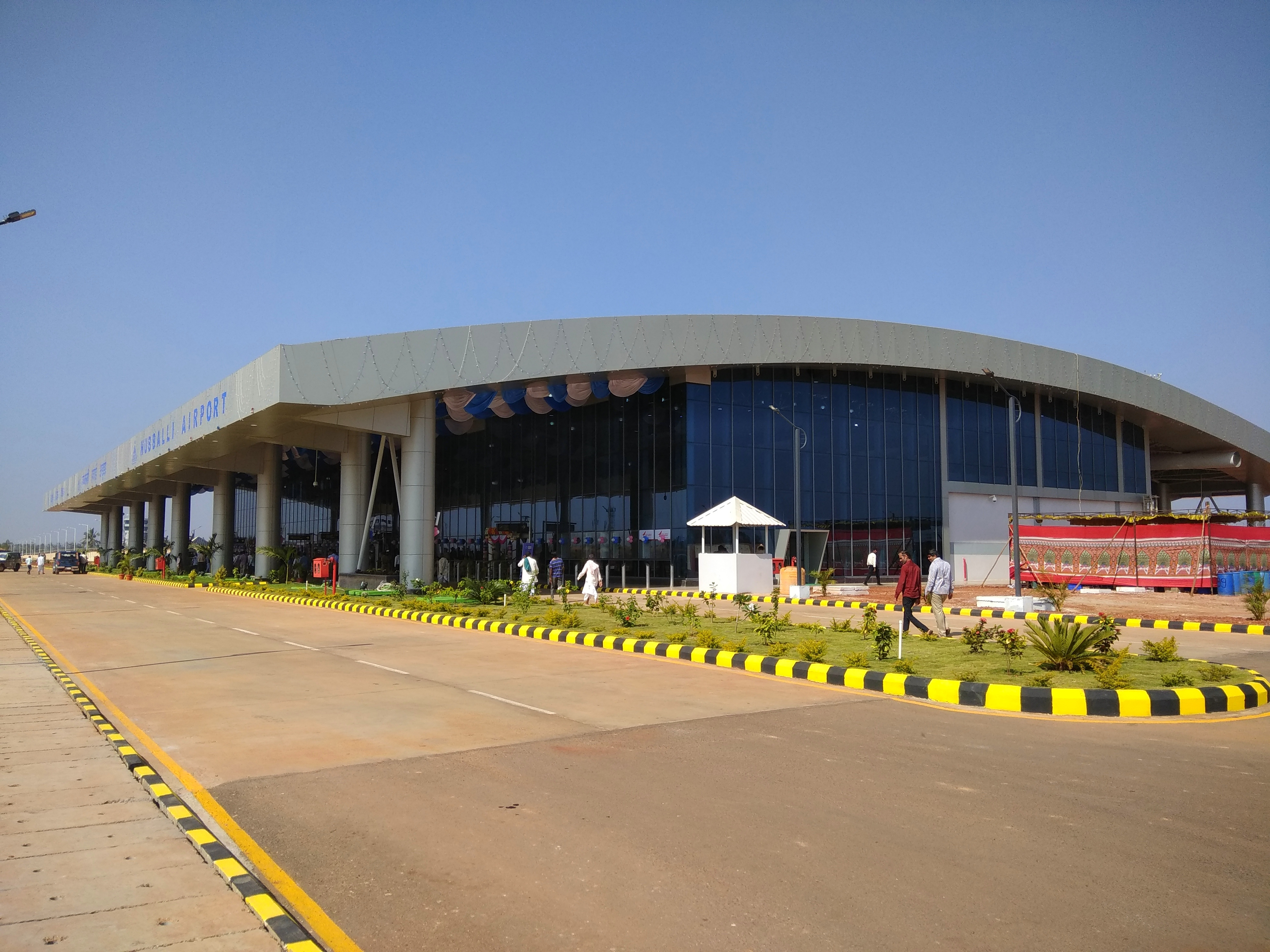
Hubli Airport

Hubli Airport (IATA: HBX, ICAO: VOHB) is a domestic airport serving the twin cities of Hubli-Dharwad and North Karnataka in the state of Karnataka, India. It is situated on Gokul Road, 8 kilometres from city centre and 20 kilometres (12 mi) from Dharwad. It is the third busiest airport in Karnataka and the 45th busiest airport in India. In March 2020, Hubli airport received the best airport award under government of India's Regional connectivity scheme. Hubli airport connects to 10 destinations throughout the country. Efforts are being made to make Hubli Airport as international Airport.

=== Rail ===
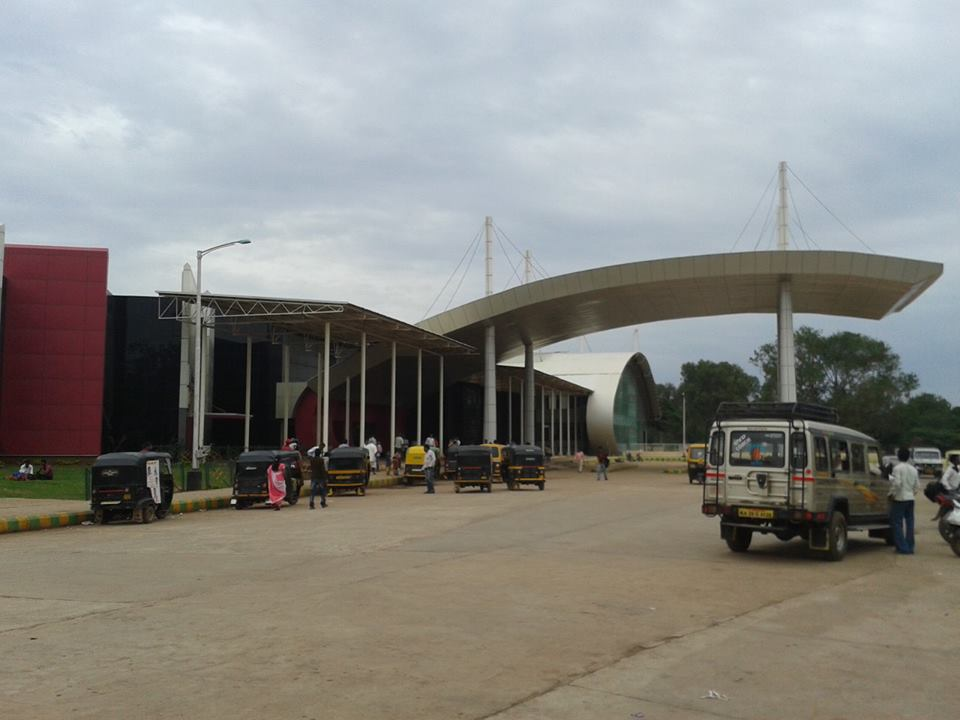
Hubli Junction railway station, South Western Railway headquarters

The city currently has four stations and one Junction. The Hubli Junction railway station is the main railway station in the city with a built-up area of 161,460 sq. ft. In September 2020, the union cabinet has approved the change of the station name to 'Shree Siddharoodha Swamiji Railway Station - Hubballi'. The other stations are Hubli South, Hubli East, Unkal, and Amargol. Hubli is the headquarters of the South Western Railway zone. It was carved out as a zone from the current South Central Railway. It is the centre for the Hubli Division. The Hubli Division is one of the highest revenue-generating divisions in India. Hubli is well-connected by the Indian Rail Network. Several trains ply from Hubli to Mumbai, New Delhi, Hyderabad, Chennai, Varanasi Vijaywada, Rameshwaram & other cities In November 2019, the work for extending a platform was undertaken by the Railways at the estimated cost of 90 Cr. According to railway officials, the length of the renewed platform is estimated at 1,505 meters, which would be longest in the world. The work is scheduled to be completed by the end of 2020. Hubli also has a Heritage Rail museum. The Indian Railways currently has 11 railway museums across the country. For bringing glory to the proposed Rail Museum, narrow-gauge Railway Rolling Stocks, from different Railways are being displayed and work is moving at a rapid pace. It is proposed to collect photographs of Rail network going back to the 19th and early 20th century so that all old memories of Rail Journey can be part of the photo gallery in the proposed Rail Heritage Museum.

=== Road ===
Hubli lies on the "Golden Quadrilateral". Asian Highway 47 passes through Hubli. It lies on National Highway 63 (Ankola–Gooty) and National Highway 52 and National Highway 50 (India) (Hubli–Humnabad), which connect Hubli with major cities in the region. NWKRTC (North West Karnataka Road Transport Corporation) is a state-run corporation headquartered at Hubli. A semi ring road connecting National Highway 48 (India) (Mumbai-Chennai), National Highway 63 (India) (Ankola–Gooty) and National Highway 52 (India) and National Highway 50 (India) (Hubli–Humnabad) with cloverleaf Junction at Gabbur is already under construction.

==== Hubli-Dharwad Bus Rapid Transit System ====
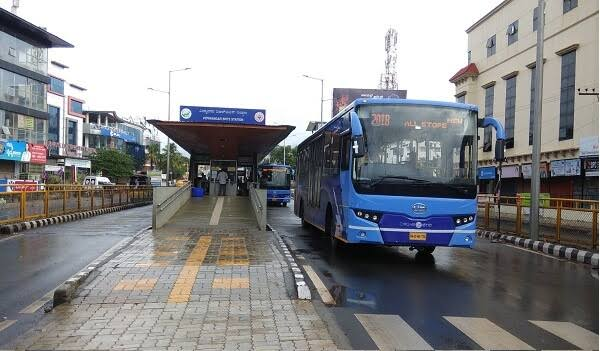
Hubli-Dharwad Bus Rapid Transit System (HDBRTS)

The Hubli-Dharwad Bus Rapid Transit System (also known as HDBRTS) is a bus rapid transit system built to serve the twin cities of Hubli and Dharwad, located in the North-Western part of Karnataka state in India. Hubli-Dharwad BRTS (HDBRTS) project is a Government of Karnataka initiative to foster long-term economic growth in the region. The project promotes fast, safe, comfortable, convenient and affordable public transportation between the twin cities and aims to reduce congestion and air pollution in the region.

The length of the Hubli-Dharwad BRTS corridor is 22.25 km (13.83 mi) from CBT Hubli to CBT–Dharwad with the width of the cross-sections ranging from 44 to 35 m (144 to 115 ft). The BRTS corridor includes segregated bus lanes, access-controlled bus stations, physical and fare integration with BRT feeder services, off-board ticketing through smart cards and bar-coded paper tickets, intelligent transport system and high-quality buses (Standard AC buses). The corridor is designed for operating regular and express services. It consists of two lanes for BRTS buses on either side of the median bus station facilitating overtaking lanes for express services. Foot overbridges at six locations, PELICAN signals, and synchronised signal management are proposed to facilitate the easy approach of passengers to bus stations.

Hubli city alone has four major bus stations, namely: CBT (Central Bus Terminal), Hosur Regional Bus Station, New Bus Stand Gokul Road, and the newly opened City and Suburban Bus Terminal (formerly known as Hubli Old Bus Stand). Each bus station is dedicated to its specific routes and destinations. The all new City and Suburban Bus Terminal is one of the best in Karnataka because of its facilities and infrastructure it owns. Out of these, Hosur Regional Bus Terminal is the busiest, as it has routes to many other parts of Karnataka.

== Education ==
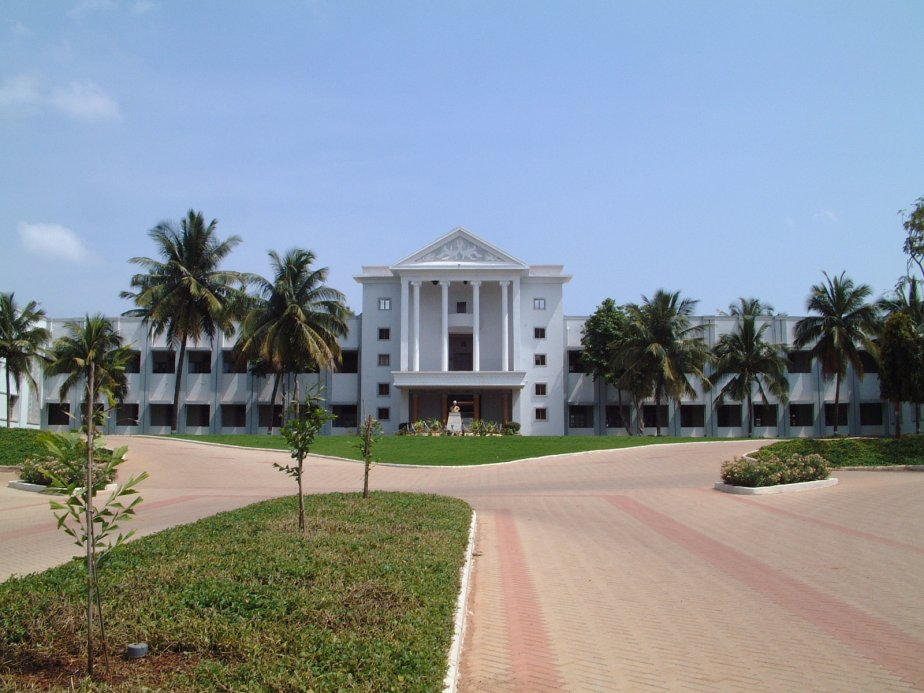
B.V. Bhoomaraddi College of Engineering and Technology

Hubli, is an education centre in Karnataka, housing several educational institutions:

- KLE Technological University, set up in 1947
- Karnataka Institute of Medical Sciences, Hubli, set up in 1957; also houses one of the largest hospitals in India
- Karnataka State Law University, Hubli; all the law colleges in Karnataka are regulated from here
- Kendriya Vidyalaya No. 1, Hubli
- KLE Institute of Technology, set up in 2008
- Nalanda BCA College
- Nehru Arts, Science and Commerce College

== Notable people ==
- Gururaj Deshpande, co-founder of Sycamore Networks, the Deshpande Center for Technological Innovation at MIT and the Deshpande Foundation
- Gangubai Hangal, Hindustani classical vocalist and Padma Vibhushan awardee
- Siddappa Kambli, politician who played an important role in the Karnataka Ekikarna Movement
- Rao Sahib Ganpatrao Narayanrao Madiman, businessman and banker
- Sudha Murty, Infosys co-founder & wife of Narayan Murthy
- Akshata Murty, British-based fashion designer and spouse of Rishi Sunak, the former prime minister of the United Kingdom
- Vijay Sankeshwar, owner of VRL Group logistic company

== See also ==
- Hubli Idgah Maidan dispute
