= Vijay Sankeshwar =

Indian businessman (born 1950)

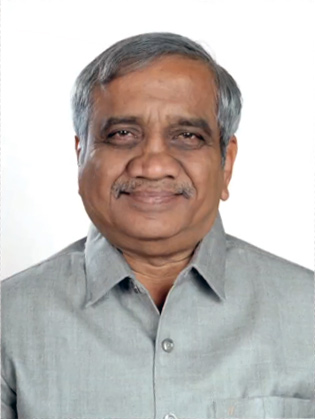
- Vijay Sankeshwar (2020)
- Born: Vijay Basavanneppa Sankeshwar; 2 August 1950 (age 76); Betagiri, Gadag, Mysore State, India (presents in Karnataka)
- Years active: 1967–present
- Title: Chairman and Managing director of VRL Group
- Political party: Bharatiya Janata Party (1993–2003; 2014–present)
- Other political affiliations: Kannada Nadu Party (2003–2004); Karnataka Janata Paksha (2004–2014)
- Board member of: VRL Group
- Spouse: Lalita (m. 1972)
- Children: 4

Vijay Sankeshwar (born 2 August 1950) is an Indian businessman from Dharwad, Karnataka. He along with Anand Sankeshwar (managing director) is the chairman of India's largest logistics firm VRL Group. He is also known for being the owner of the largest fleet of commercial vehicles in India.

He left BJP and founded the Kannada Nadu Party. Later he joined the Karnataka Janata Paksha of BJP outcast Yeddyurappa; the party eventually merged back with BJP. Sankeshwar was also a former Member of Parliament from North Dharwad constituency as a BJP member.

Sankeshwar previously owned Karnataka's largest circulating newspaper, Vijaya Karnataka, until it was sold to Bennett, Coleman and Co. Ltd. (The Times Group) for an undisclosed sum in 2007. After the expiry of a five-year non-compete clause he launched Vijaya Vani in 2012. Vijaya Vani is now the #1 Kannada daily newspaper, with 8 lakh+ sold copies every day.

Sankeshwar launched a new Kannada channel, Digvijay 24X7, on April 4, 2017.

In 2020, the Government of India honored him with the Padma Shri, the fourth highest civilian award in the Republic of India.

== Personal life ==
Vijay Sankeshwar was born on 2 August 1950 in Betageri, Gadag, Mysore State (now in Karnataka), to Basavanneppa Sankeshwar and Chandrawwa, in an influential lingayat Banajiga community family. His father, was a businessman who established the printing press B G Sankeshwar and Co. (now Sankeshwar Printer Private Limited) in Gadag.

Sankeshwar married to Lalitha Sankeshwar on 14 December 1972. The couple had three daughters and a son, Anand Sankeshwar, who currently is the managing director of VRL Logistics Limited.

=== Education ===
Sankeshwar obtained a commerce at Adarsh Shikshan Samiti, College of Commerce, Gadag, Karnataka University, Dharwad, Karnataka.

== Business career ==
Vijay got interest in transport business and in 1976 started the cargo business with one truck that he had bought by taking a loan of Rs 2 lakhs. Initially he suffered severe losses due to accidents, no communication, and competition.

In 1978, Vijay Sankeshwar and his family shifted to Hubballi to expand their transport business and brought three more trucks for business. In 1983, started a transport company Vijayanand Roadlines Limited. In beginning of 1990 VRL had 117 commercial vehicles and had turnover more than ₹4 crores. In 1993, starts the courier delivery across the Karnataka. Sankeshwar purchase 4 Passenger Buses in 1996, which carry passengers Bangalore to Hubballi.

== Political career ==
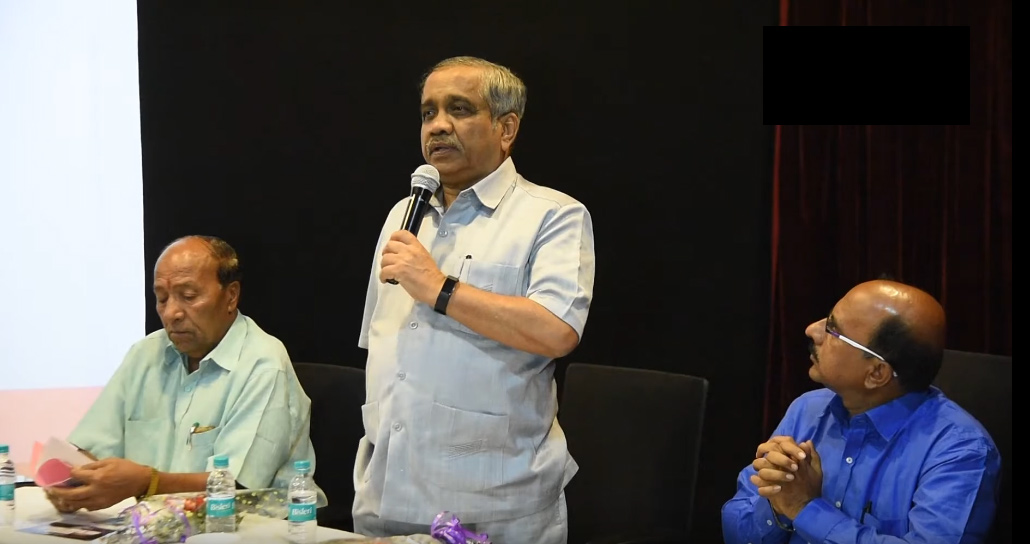
Vijay Sankeshwar (middle), in 2018

Year	Positions held
1993	Member, B.J.P., Dist. Dharwad, Karnataka (held various positions at district and state level)
1996	Elected to 11th Lok Sabha
1996-97	Member, Committee on Finance; member, Consultative Committee, Ministry of Surface Transport
1998	Re-elected to 12th Lok Sabha (2nd term)
1998-99	Transport
1999	Re-elected to 13th Lok Sabha (3rd term)
1999-2000	Member, Committee on Commerce; member, Committee on Transport and Tourism

== In popular culture ==
In 2022, Anand Sankeshwar produced the biopic of Vijay Sankeshwar as Vijayanand released on 9 December 2022 in Kannada, Tamil, Telugu, Hindi and Malayalam. The biopic will focus on Sankeshwar's journey from owning a single truck to making it India's largest logistics fleet.
